= 2008 Atlantic Coast Conference football season =

2008 ACC football season
- League: NCAA Division I Football Bowl Subdivision
- Sport: football
- Duration: August 28, 2008 – January 1, 2009
- Teams: 12

Regular season
- Season champions: Virginia Tech
- Season MVP: Tyrod Taylor
- Atlantic champions: Boston College
- Coastal champions: Virginia Tech

ACC Championship Game
- Champions: Virginia Tech
- Runners-up: Boston College

ACC seasons
- ← 2007 2009 →

2008 Atlantic Coast Conference football standings
	Conf.			Overall
Team	W		L	W		L
Atlantic Division
Boston College xy	5	–	3	9	–	5
No. 21 Florida State x	5	–	3	9	–	4
Maryland	4	–	4	8	–	5
Wake Forest	4	–	4	8	–	5
Clemson	4	–	4	7	–	6
NC State	4	–	4	6	–	7
Coastal Division
No. 15 Virginia Tech xy$	5	–	3	10	–	4
No. 22 Georgia Tech x	5	–	3	9	–	4
North Carolina	0	–	4	0	–	5
Miami (FL)	4	–	4	7	–	6
Virginia	3	–	5	5	–	7
Duke	1	–	7	4	–	8
Championship: Virginia Tech 30, Boston College 12
$ – BCS representative as conference champion; x – Division champion/co-champions; y – Championship game participant; North Carolina vacated 8 wins, including 4 ACC wins; Rankings from AP Poll

The 2008 Atlantic Coast Conference football season was the 56th season that the Atlantic Coast Conference (ACC) participated in National Collegiate Athletic Association (NCAA) college football. As a Bowl Championship Series (BCS) conference, the ACC's constituent members competed within the framework of the NCAA Division I Football Bowl Subdivision (FBS).

The media widely recognized the 2008 season as one of the most chaotic in the conference's history. At season's end, the ACC fielded an NCAA-record of ten bowl eligible teams from its twelve conference members.

Virginia Tech secured its second consecutive conference championship when it won the 2008 ACC Championship Game against Boston College. Likewise, it was the second consecutive season that Boston College finished as the conference runner-up. Virginia Tech went on to represent the conference in its BCS game, the 2008 Orange Bowl, and, with a victory over Cincinnati, ended the ACC's eight-year BCS game slump.

== Statistical leaders ==
Passing
Player	School	Comp	Att	Yds	TDs	Int	Rat
Russell Wilson	N.C. State	150	275	1,955	17	1	133.9
Cullen Harper	Clemson	221	360	2,601	17	14	126.2
Riley Skinner	Wake Forest	232	363	2,347	13	7	126.2
Thaddeus Lewis	Duke	224	361	2,171	15	6	123.0
Chris Turner	Maryland	214	374	2,516	13	11	119.3

Rushing
Player	School	Att	Yds	Avg	TDs
Jonathan Dwyer	Georgia Tech	200	1,395	7.0	12
Da'Rel Scott	Maryland	209	1,133	5.4	8
Darren Evans	Virginia Tech	287	1,265	4.4	11
Cedric Peerman	Virginia	153	774	5.1	7
Montel Harris	Boston College	179	900	5.0	5

Receiving
Player	School	Rec	YDs	Avg	TDs
Hakeem Nicks	North Carolina	68	1,222	18.0	12
DJ Boldin	Wake Forest	81	848	10.5	3
Kevin Ogletree	Virginia	58	723	12.5	5
Aaron Kelly	Clemson	67	722	10.8	4
Jacoby Ford	Clemson	55	710	12.9	4

Tackles
Player	School	Solo	Asst	Total
Michael Tauiliili	Duke	63	77	140
Alex Wujciak	Maryland	56	77	133
Quan Sturdivant	North Carolina	87	35	122
Mark Herzlich	Boston College	81	29	110
Vincent Rey	Duke	61	48	109

Sacks
Player	School	Solo	Asst	Yds
Everette Brown	Florida State	13	1	97
Clint Sintim	Virginia	9	4	86
Michael Johnson	Georgia Tech	8	2	85
Jason Worilds	Virginia Tech	8	2	85
B. J. Raji	Boston College	7	1	48

Interceptions
Player	School	Int	Yds	TDs
Trimane Goddard	North Carolina	7	156	1
Paul Anderson	Boston College	6	149	1
Macho Harris	Virginia Tech	6	142	2
Mark Herzlich	Boston College	6	121	2
Michael Hamlin	Clemson	6	111	0

== Noteworthy games ==
- East Carolina 27, Virginia Tech 22: Virginia Tech is defeated in its season-opener against Conference USA's ECU, which defeats a ranked opponent for a second consecutive game. East Carolina clinched the game after returning a blocked punt for a touchdown, and beat Virginia Tech at its own game of special teams-oriented "Beamer Ball."
- Wake Forest 30, Mississippi 28: With three seconds remaining, Wake Forest placekicker Sam Swank makes a field goal to clinch the victory. The win was Wake Forest's 400th in school history.
- Middle Tennessee 24, Maryland 14: The Sun Belt Conference's Middle Tennessee records it first-ever victory over an ACC team. It was just their fourth win against a BCS conference opponent, with the previous three all being against Vanderbilt.
- Boston College 34, Central Florida 7: In the first quarter, Boston College quarterback Chris Crane was booed off the field by the home crowd and replaced by back-up Dominique Davis. Crane, however, returns on the next series and leads Boston College to a rout over UCF.
- Duke 31, Virginia 3: With its first conference win since 2004, Duke ended a 25-game losing streak in ACC play. After a stalemate, 3–3, at halftime, Virginia quarterback Marc Verica threw four interceptions in the second half.
- Boston College 38, N.C. State 31: With 23 seconds remaining, Boston College quarterback Chris Crane scored on a 13-yard quarterback keeper for the go-ahead.
- Florida State 39, Colorado 21: Bobby Bowden coached Florida State to defeat Colorado in his 500th game as a head coach.
- Boston College 38, N.C. State 31: With 22.8 seconds remaining, Boston College quarterback Chris Crane scores the go-ahead on a quarterback keeper.
- Florida State 41, Miami 39: A total 80 combined points were the most points ever scored in the state rivalry.
- Boston College 28, Virginia Tech 23: Boston College, the only ACC team to have beaten Virginia Tech on the road since the Hokies joined the conference, did it a second time.
- Maryland 27, N.C. State 24: With six seconds remaining, Maryland placekicker Obi Egekeze makes a field goal to clinch the victory.
- Clemson 27, Boston College 21: Clemson's C. J. Spiller caught six receptions, a school record for a running back. Dabo Swinney recorded his first win as Clemson head coach.
- Virginia 24, Georgia Tech 17: After an abysmal 1–3 start to the season, Virginia beat Georgia Tech to temporarily assume first-place in the Coastal Division.
- Georgia Tech 31, Florida State 28: With 45 seconds remaining, Georgia Tech safety Cooper Taylor forced a Florida State fumble in the endzone to prevent an almost certain winning touchdown.
- Wake Forest 33, Duke 30: Wake Forest's back-up placekicker, Shane Popham, filled in for Sam Swank and kicked a field goal in overtime for the win.
- Florida State 41, Clemson 27: Florida State attained bowl eligibility for the 27th consecutive season on Bobby Bowden's 79th birthday.
- Boston College 17, Notre Dame 0: Boston College recorded the first shut-out on either side of the 18-game series against Notre Dame.
- Clemson 31, Duke 7: Clemson receiver Aaron Kelly caught ten passes and surpassed the all-time ACC record for career receptions with 217.
- Maryland 17, North Carolina 15: With 1:42 remaining, a Maryland field goal edged 16th-ranked North Carolina for the Terrapins' fourth win over a ranked opponent in 2008. Only Oklahoma and Florida, the two teams in the BCS Championship Game, exceeded the feat.
- N.C. State 41, North Carolina 10: By routing 21st-ranked North Carolina, N.C. State completes its run of the table on the Tobacco Road with wins over all four other FBS teams in the state.
- Boston College 24, Wake Forest 21: Boston College back-up quarterback Dominique Davis replaced an injured Chris Crane in the second quarter. With 1:12 remaining in the game, Davis scored a touchdown and kept Boston College in contention for a spot in the conference title game.
- Virginia Tech 17, Virginia 14: A fourth quarter field goal allowed Virginia Tech to edge Virginia in the Commonwealth Cup. The win ensured the Hokies a berth in the ACC Championship Game.
- Clemson 31, South Carolina 14: Clemson secured its tenth win in the last twelve games of the intrastate rivalry.
- Georgia Tech 45, Georgia 42: Having trailed by 16 points at halftime, Georgia Tech outrushed Georgia 201 yards to one in the second half. It was Georgia Tech's first win in the Clean, Old-Fashioned Hate rivalry since 1999.
- Boston College 28, Maryland 21: Holder Billy Flutie, nephew of Doug Flutie, executed a pass during a fake field-goal attempt which proved to be the margin of victory in the game that clinched Boston College's trip to the ACC Championship Game.
- N.C. State 38, Miami 28: Quarterback Russell Wilson led N.C State from a 2–6 season start to bowl eligibility with its win over Miami.
- Florida 45, Florida State 15: Florida of the Southeastern Conference extends its winning streak to five in the rivalry.

== Awards ==
=== National awards ===
- Dick Butkus Award (linebacker): Aaron Curry, Wake Forest
- Lou Groza Award (placekicker): Graham Gano, Florida State

=== Conference awards ===
Awards selected by ACSMA (Atlantic Coast sports media association)

- Coach of the Year: Paul Johnson, Georgia Tech
- Player of the Year: Jonathan Dwyer, Georgia Tech
- Offensive Player of the Year: Jonathan Dwyer, Georgia Tech
- Defensive Player of the Year: Mark Herzlich, Boston College
- Rookie of the Year: Russell Wilson, N.C. State
- Jim Tatum Award (outstanding senior): Darryl Richard, Georgia Tech
- Brian Piccolo Award (overcoming adversity): Robert Quinn, North Carolina
- Jacobs Blocking Award (outstanding blocker): Eugene Monroe, Virginia

== Honors ==
=== All-conference teams ===
Postseason awards are selected by the Atlantic Coast sports media association by votes

==== Offense ====
First team				Second team			
Pos.	Selection	School	Votes	Pos.	Selection	School	Votes
QB	Russell Wilson	NC State	106	QB	Thaddeus Lewis	Duke	28
RB	Jonathan Dwyer	Georgia Tech	134	RB	Darren Evans	Virginia Tech	58
RB	Da'Rel Scott	Maryland	76	RB	C. J. Spiller	Clemson	50
WR	Hakeem Nicks	North Carolina	130	WR	Eron Riley	Duke	57
WR	DJ Boldin	Wake Forest	76	WR	Aaron Kelly	Clemson	56
TE	John Phillips	Virginia	88	TE	Ryan Purvis	Boston College	45
OT	Eugene Monroe	Virginia	117	OT	Garrett Reynolds	North Carolina	42
OT	Andrew Gardner	Georgia Tech	107	OT	Anthony Castonzo	Boston College	41
OG	Rodney Hudson	Florida State	99	OG	Sergio Render	Virginia Tech	48
OG	Cliff Ramsey	Boston College	78	OG	Cordaro Howard	Georgia Tech	45
C	Edwin Williams	Maryland	62	C	Thomas Austin	Clemson	48

==== Defense ====
First team				Second team			
Pos.	Selection	School	Votes	Pos.	Selection	School	Votes
DE	Everette Brown	Florida State	131	DE	Orion Martin	Virginia Tech	61
DE	Michael Johnson	Georgia Tech	99	DE	Jason Worilds	Virginia Tech	39
DT	B. J. Raji	Boston College	103	DT	Ron Brace	Boston College	52
DT	Vance Walker	Georgia Tech	62	DT	Darryl Richard	Georgia Tech	50
LB	Mark Herzlich	Boston College	118	LB	Clint Sintim	Virginia	79
LB	Michael Tauiliili	Duke	110	LB	Alex Wujciak	Maryland	43
LB	Aaron Curry	Wake Forest	106	LB	Mark Paschal	North Carolina	40
CB	Alphonso Smith	Wake Forest	134	CB	Ras-I Dowling	Virginia	49
CB	Victor Harris	Virginia Tech	125	CB	Kendric Burney	North Carolina	34
S	Trimane Goddard	North Carolina	105	S	Morgan Burnett	Georgia Tech	85
S	Michael Hamlin	Clemson	89	S	Myron Rolle	Florida State	55

==== Special teams ====
First team				Second team			
Pos.	Selection	School	Votes	Pos.	Selection	School	Votes
K	Graham Gano	Florida State	127	K	Matt Bosher	Miami	34
P	Travis Baltz	Maryland	105	P	Matt Bosher	Miami	60
SP	C. J. Spiller	Clemson	66	SP	Michael Ray Garvin	Florida State	41

== ACC players in the NFL draft ==
In the 2009 NFL draft, 32 former ACC players were selected. The ACC was second only to the Southeastern Conference (SEC), which had 37 former players selected. The Big 12 and Big Ten each had 28 and the Big East had 27 former players selected. Of the ACC schools, Maryland and North Carolina tied for most former players selected at five. Clemson, Georgia Tech, Wake Forest, and Virginia each had four former players selected.

#	Conference	Players selected
1	SEC	37
2	ACC	32
3	Big 12	28
3	Big Ten	28
5	Big East	27
6	Pac-10	23
7	MWC	16
8	C-USA	10
8	MAC	10
8	WAC	10
–	All others	24

Player	Position	School	Pick	Round	Team
Aaron Curry	OLB	Wake Forest	4	1	Seattle Seahawks
Darrius Heyward-Bey	WR	Maryland	7	1	Oakland Raiders
Eugene Monroe	OT	Virginia	8	1	Jacksonville Jaguars
B. J. Raji	DT	Boston College	9	1	Green Bay Packers
Hakeem Nicks	WR	North Carolina	29	1	New York Giants
Alphonso Smith	CB	Wake Forest	37	2	Denver Broncos
Ron Brace	DT	Boston College	40	2	New England Patriots
Everette Brown	DE	Florida State	43	2	Carolina Panthers
Clint Sintim	OLB	Virginia	45	2	New York Giants
Richard Quinn	TE	North Carolina	64	2	Denver Broncos
Michael Johnson	DE	Georgia Tech	70	3	Cincinnati Bengals
Kevin Barnes	CB	Maryland	80	3	Washington Redskins
Brandon Tate		North Carolina	83	3	New England Patriots
Dorell Scott		Clemson	103	4	St. Louis Rams
Chip Vaughn		Wake Forest	116	4	New Orleans Saints
Stanley Arnoux		Wake Forest	118	4	New Orleans Saints
Anthony Hill		NC State	122	4	Houston Texans
Andre Brown		NC State	129	4	New York Giants
Garrett Reynolds		North Carolina	156	5	Atlanta Falcons
Victor Harris		Virginia Tech	157	5	Philadelphia Eagles
Brooks Foster		North Carolina	160	5	St. Louis Rams
Chris Clemons		Clemson	165	5	Miami Dolphins
Michael Hamlin		Clemson	166	5	Dallas Cowboys
Spencer Adkins		Miami	176	6	Atlanta Falcons
Andrew Gardner		Georgia Tech	181	6	Miami Dolphins
Cedric Peerman		Virginia	185	6	Baltimore Ravens
James Davis		Clemson	195	6	Cleveland Browns
John Phillips		Virginia	208	6	Dallas Cowboys
Vance Walker		Georgia Tech	210	7	Atlanta Falcons
Moise Fokou		Maryland	230	7	Philadelphia Eagles
Darryl Richard		Georgia Tech	234	7	New England Patriots
Jaimie Thomas		Maryland	236	7	Indianapolis Colts
Dan Gronkowski	TE	Maryland	255	7	Detroit Lions
