= Darryl Richard =

Darryl Richard may refer to:

- Darryl Richard (American football) (born 1986), American football defensive tackle
- Darryl Richard (actor) (born 1946), American actor
