= Everette Brown =

American football player and coach (born 1987)

No. 91, 71, 90 – Carolina Panthers
- Title: Assistant linebackers coach

Personal information
- Born: August 7, 1987 (age 39); Greenville, North Carolina, U.S.
- Listed height: 6 ft 1 in (1.85 m)
- Listed weight: 263 lb (119 kg)

Career information
- High school: Beddingfield (Wilson, North Carolina)
- College: Florida State
- NFL draft: 2009: 2nd round, 43rd overall pick

Career history

Playing
- Carolina Panthers (2009–2010); San Diego Chargers (2011); Detroit Lions (2012)*; Philadelphia Eagles (2013)*; Dallas Cowboys (2013); Washington Redskins (2014); Cleveland Browns (2015)*
- * Offseason or practice squad member only

Coaching
- Carolina Panthers (2019–present) Assistant linebackers coach

Awards and highlights
- Second-team All-American (2008); Freshman All-American (2006); First-team All-ACC (2008); Freshman All-ACC (2006)

Career NFL statistics
- Total tackles: 67
- Sacks: 7.0
- Forced fumbles: 4
- Interceptions: 1
- Stats at Pro Football Reference

Everette D. Brown (born August 7, 1987) is an American football coach and former linebacker who is currently the assistant linebackers coach for the Carolina Panthers of the National Football League (NFL). He played college football for the Florida State Seminoles and was selected by the Carolina Panthers in second round of the 2009 NFL draft. Brown also played for the San Diego Chargers, Detroit Lions, Philadelphia Eagles, Dallas Cowboys, and Washington Redskins.

== Early life ==
Brown attended Beddingfield High School in Wilson, North Carolina, where he graduated in 2005. He was a two-sport star in football and track. In high school football, he recorded 120 tackles with 16 sacks as a senior. Brown also caught 40 passes for 770 yards and 10 touchdowns as a tight end. He played in the Shrine Bowl All-Star game.

Also an standout track & field athlete, Brown was a state qualifier in the sprinting events. He captured the state title in the 200-meter dash event at the 2002 NCHSAA 1A T&F Championships, recording a career-best time of 22.2 seconds. At the 2003 NCHSAA 1A T&F Championships, he took 9th in the 100-meter dash (11.5 s), 5th in the 200-meter dash (22.7 s) and 9th in the high jump (5 ft 10 in).

Regarded as a four-star recruit by Rivals.com, Brown was listed as the No. 3 weakside defensive end prospects in his class. Receiving numerous offers, he took official visits to Florida State, North Carolina, and Virginia Tech, before committing to the Seminoles.

== College career ==
Brown red-shirted in 2005. In 2006 Brown was a Freshman All-American and All-ACC Freshman team honoree by The Sporting News. He played in all 13 games while starting three games. He finished eighth on the team and second among Seminole freshmen (behind Freshman All-American honoree Myron Rolle) in tackles with 27. He was second on the team in tackles for minus yardage with 13.5 and tied for third on the team with three quarterback sacks.

His sophomore season of 2007 he was a starter at the left defensive end position where he earned a career-high eight starting assignments for the season and he also recorded one start on the right side. He led the team in sacks, and led all defensive linemen in tackles and tackles for loss while totaling a single-season career-high 37 tackles, a single-season career-high 6.5 quarterback sacks and 11.5 tackles for minus yardage

In 2008, he was the Seminoles starter at the right defensive end position in each of the 13 games during the 2008 regular season. He earned All-America Second-team honors by Rivals.com, Associated Press, Scout.com and the Walter Camp Foundation. He was also the runner-up for ACC Player of the Year honors and the runner-up as the ACC Defensive Player of the Year. Brown was All-ACC First-team honors., a finalist for the Ted Hendricks Award. He finished the season third in the nation in sacks (13.5) and tied for fourth in the FBS in tackles for loss (21.5). He was the team leader as well as ACC leader with a career-high 21.5 tackles for loss and the team leader with a career-high 13.5 quarterback sacks. He finished second in school history with 46.5 tackles for loss. and ranks third all-time for a single-season with 13.5 quarterback sacks and fifth all-time with 23.0 career quarterback sacks. Finished season with 36 stops with a career-high 30 unassisted tackles and 36 total tackles. He completed his FSU with 100 career tackles in just three seasons.

=== Career statistics ===
Season	Team	Games		Tackles					Fum & Int			
Season	Team	GP	GS	Solo	Ast	Cmb	TfL	Sck	FF	FR	PD	Int
2005	Florida State	2	0	0	0	0	0.0	0.0	0	0	0	0
2006	Florida State	13	3	16	11	27	13.5	3.0	0	0	0	0
2007	Florida State	13	13	24	13	37	11.5	6.5	1	0	3	0
2008	Florida State	13	13	30	6	36	21.5	13.5	4	1	2	0
Totals		41	29	70	30	100	46.5	23.0	5	1	5	0

== Professional career ==
=== 2009 NFL draft ===
Having already received his college degree, Brown decided to forgo his final season of eligibility and enter the 2009 NFL draft. Brown was considered “a perfect fit as a rush-linebacker in a 3-4 scheme” by ESPN′s Todd McShay. He was listed at 6 ft 4 in (1.93 m) by Florida State's media guide, but turned out to be just under 6 ft 2 in (1.88 m) at the NFL Combine.

Pre-draft measurables
Height	Weight	40-yard dash	10-yard split	20-yard split	20-yard shuttle	Three-cone drill	Vertical jump	Broad jump	Bench press	Wonderlic
6 ft 1 1/2 in (1.87 m)	256 lb (116 kg)	4.65 s	1.59 s	2.68 s	4.53 s	7.55 s	31 1/2 in (0.80 m)	9 ft 9 in (2.97 m)	26 reps	21
All values from NFL Combine, except "Broad", which is from Florida State Pro Day.

=== Carolina Panthers ===
Originally projected a first-round draft pick, Brown saw his draft stock falling because of questions about his size. He was picked 43rd overall in the second round by the Panthers, who traded their 2010 NFL draft first-round pick to the San Francisco 49ers to get that pick.

With Julius Peppers still demanding a trade, Brown was shifted to the right side defensive end spot in June 2009. In his first NFL season, Brown recorded 22 total tackles (15 solo), 2.5 sacks and 2 forced fumbles.

On September 4, 2011, Brown was waived by Carolina after recording 6 sacks in two seasons.

=== San Diego Chargers ===
Brown signed with the San Diego Chargers on November 1, 2011. He was released on March 13, 2012.

=== Detroit Lions ===
Brown signed with the Detroit Lions on March 22, 2012.

=== Philadelphia Eagles ===
Brown signed with the Philadelphia Eagles on January 2, 2013. He was released on August 30, 2013.

=== Dallas Cowboys ===
Brown signed with the Dallas Cowboys on October 29, 2013. In his first game for the Cowboys five days later, he registered a sack on Minnesota Vikings's quarterback Christian Ponder in the Cowboys' 27-23 victory.

Brown was released by the Cowboys on February 28, 2014.

=== Washington Redskins ===
Brown signed with the Washington Redskins on July 28, 2014, their fifth day of training camp, after releasing outside linebacker Brandon Jenkins. The Redskins released him on August 30, 2014, for final roster cuts before the start of the 2014 season. He was re-signed on October 21, 2014, after a season-ending injury to Brian Orakpo, but was released on December 9, 2014.

=== Cleveland Browns ===
On August 16, 2015, Everette signed with the Cleveland Browns. On August 31, 2015, he was released by the Browns.

== Coaching career ==
=== Carolina Panthers ===
On February 8, 2019, Brown was hired by the Carolina Panthers as an assistant linebackers coach.

== Personal life ==
Brown was born in Stantonsburg, North Carolina, a small town with a current population of 706. During his time at Florida State, he volunteered at various schools and spoke at campaigns designed to warn children about the ill effects of tobacco.
