= Clint Sintim =

American football player and coach (born 1986)

Colorado State Rams
- Title: Linebackers coach

Personal information
- Born: February 21, 1986 (age 40); Fairfax County, Virginia, U.S.
- Listed height: 6 ft 3 in (1.91 m)
- Listed weight: 256 lb (116 kg)

Career information
- High school: Gar-Field (Woodbridge, Virginia)
- College: Virginia
- NFL draft: 2009: 2nd round, 45th overall pick

Career history

Playing
- New York Giants (2009−2011)

Coaching
- West Alabama (2014) Outside linebackers/special teams coach; Richmond (2015−2016) Outside linebackers coach; Delaware (2017) Outside linebackers coach; Delaware (2018–2019) Co-special teams coordinator Outside linebackers coach; Virginia (2020–2021) Defensive line coach; Virginia (2022–2023) Linebackers coach; Illinois (2024) Linebackers coach; Colorado State (2025–present) Linebackers coach

Awards and highlights
- Super Bowl champion (XLVI); 2005 ACC Defensive Freshman of the Year; Freshman All-American (2005); Second-team All-ACC (2008); Freshman All-ACC (2005)

Career NFL statistics
- Total tackles: 33
- Sacks: 1
- Stats at Pro Football Reference

Clint Kofi Sintim (born February 21, 1986) is an American football coach and former player who is the linebackers coach for Colorado State University. He played professionally as a linebacker in the National Football League (NFL). Sintim played college football for the Virginia Cavaliers and was selected by the New York Giants in the second round of the 2009 NFL draft.

== Early life ==
A native of Fairfax County, Virginia, Sintim attended Gar-Field Senior High School, where he made 35 tackles and had three quarterback sacks as a senior and earned first-team all-state and SuperPrep All-American honors. Sintim broke his left leg playing for Gar-Field's boys basketball team on January 13. He is of Ghanaian descent.

Considered a three-star recruit by Rivals.com, Sintim was listed as the No. 30 strongside defensive end prospect in the nation. He picked Virginia over Tennessee and Virginia Tech on February 2, 2004.

== College career ==
Sintim lined up as rush linebacker in Virginia's 3-4 defense. He led the NCAA in sacks by a linebacker his senior year. He ranked third on the team with 70 tackles (38 solos) and had eleven sacks and thirteen stops for losses in 2008. Additionally, he caused a fumble and recovered two others and deflected three passes

In 2007, he started all 13 games and had 78 tackles, with 44 being solo and nine going for a loss. He also had nine sacks and forced three fumbles and was second on the team behind Chris Long with 17 quarterback pressures. The previous season, 2006, he started all twelve games and had 45 tackles (22 solo) with 10 of them going for a loss. He also had four sacks and forced a fumble and recovered one and had five quarterback pressures.

== Professional career ==
Pre-draft measurables
Height	Weight	40-yard dash	10-yard split	20-yard split	20-yard shuttle	Three-cone drill	Vertical jump	Broad jump	Wonderlic
6 ft 2 3/4 in (1.90 m)	256 lb (116 kg)	4.75 s	1.56 s	2.71 s	4.40 s	7.37 s	34 1/2 in (0.88 m)	9 ft 11 in (3.02 m)	17
All values from NFL Combine

Sintim was selected in the second round with the 45th overall pick of the 2009 NFL draft by the New York Giants on April 25, 2009. On July 30, the Giants announced that they had signed Sintim to the roster. Eventually, he was expected to replace the Danny Clark/Bryan Kehl linebacker position. Sintim made his debut on October 11, 2009 against the Oakland Raiders in Giants Stadium. He recorded 4 tackles in the game. Three were solo and one assist. Sintim ended his rookie season with a total of 20 Tackles (14 Solo, 6 Assisted) 1.0 sack and 1 tackle for a loss in 11 games. In 2010, he recorded a total of 13 tackles (7 Solo, 6 Assisted) and appeared in 13 games. Sintim tore his ACL twice and never played in 2011. In 2012, he entered training camp on the physically unable to perform list and was eventually waived on August 16, 2012 after failing a team physical. On May 6, 2013, he announced his retirement.
