= Vance Walker =

American football player (born 1987)

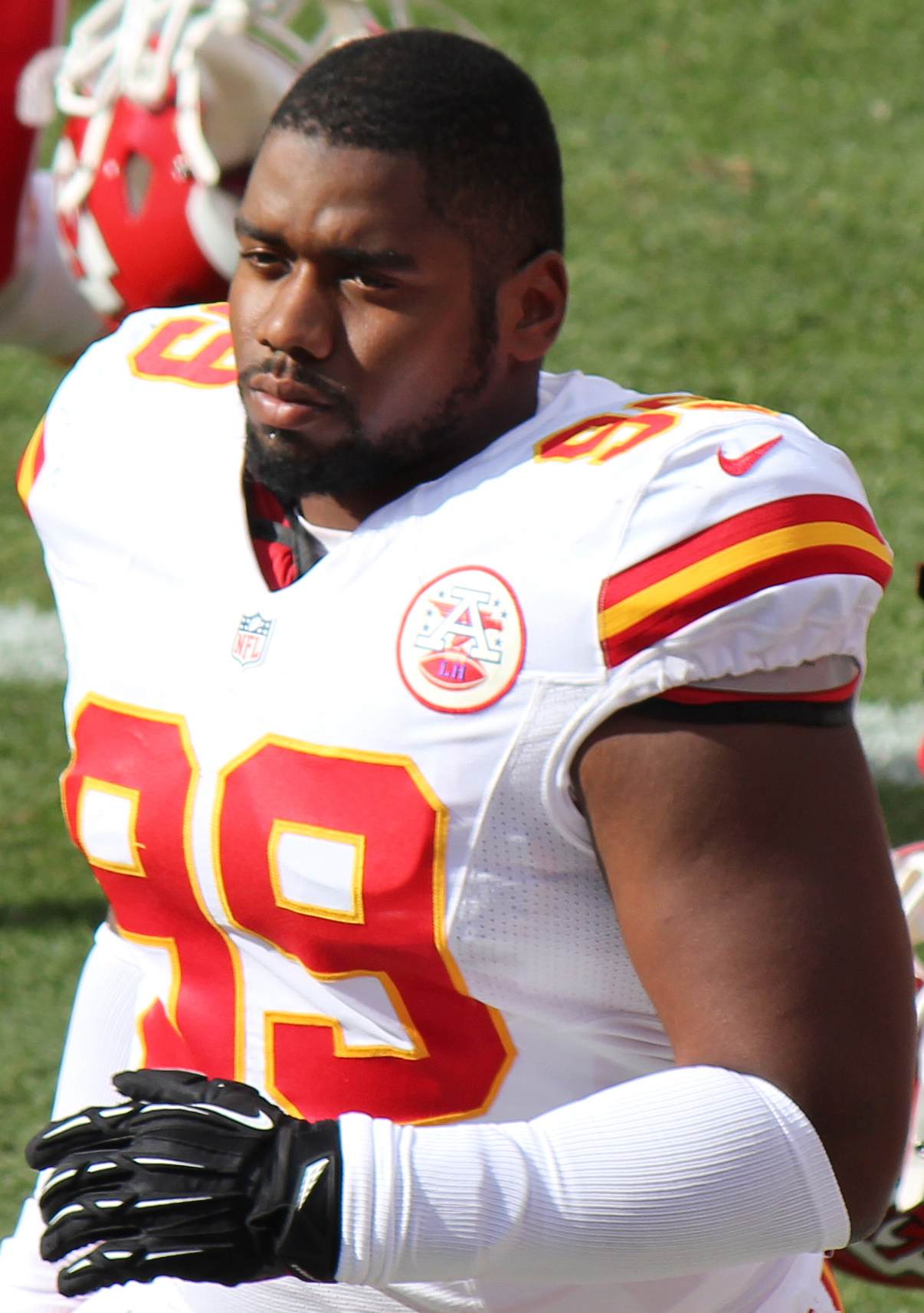
- Walker with the Kansas City Chiefs in 2014

No. 99, 98, 96
- Position: Defensive end

Personal information
- Born: April 26, 1987 (age 39); Cincinnati, Ohio, U.S.
- Listed height: 6 ft 2 in (1.88 m)
- Listed weight: 295 lb (134 kg)

Career information
- High school: Fort Mill (SC)
- College: Georgia Tech
- NFL draft: 2009: 7th round, 210th overall pick

Career history
- Atlanta Falcons (2009–2012); Oakland Raiders (2013); Kansas City Chiefs (2014); Denver Broncos (2015–2016)

Awards and highlights
- Super Bowl champion (50); Third-team All-American (2007); 2× First-team All-ACC (2007, 2008)

Career NFL statistics
- Total tackles: 172
- Sacks: 12
- Forced fumbles: 2
- Fumble recoveries: 1
- Pass deflections: 2
- Stats at Pro Football Reference

Vance Jack Walker (born April 26, 1987) is an American former professional football player who was a defensive end in the National Football League (NFL). He was selected by the Atlanta Falcons in the seventh round of the 2009 NFL draft. He played high school football at Fort Mill High School and college football for the Georgia Tech Yellow Jackets.

== Professional career ==
=== Atlanta Falcons ===
Walker was selected in the seventh round (210th overall) in the 2009 NFL draft. Falcons re-signed Walker to a one-year, $1.26 million contract on March 13, 2012.

=== Oakland Raiders ===
Walker signed with the Oakland Raiders on March 18, 2013.

=== Kansas City Chiefs ===
On March 14, 2014, he signed a three-year deal with the Kansas City Chiefs. He was released by the team on March 6, 2015.

=== Denver Broncos ===
On March 12, 2015, Walker signed with the Denver Broncos. On February 7, 2016, Walker was part of the Broncos team that won Super Bowl 50. In the game, the Broncos defeated the Carolina Panthers by a score of 24–10. Walker recorded two tackles in the Super Bowl. On August 19, 2016, Walker was placed on the Broncos' injured reserve.

== NFL career statistics ==
Legend
**Bold**	Career high

=== Regular season ===
Year	Team	Games		Tackles					Interceptions					Fumbles			
Year	Team	GP	GS	Cmb	Solo	Ast	Sck	TFL	Int	Yds	TD	Lng	PD	FF	FR	Yds	TD
2009	ATL	10	1	13	8	5	0.0	2	0	0	0	0	**2**	0	0	0	0
2010	ATL	**16**	1	17	11	6	0.0	3	0	0	0	0	0	0	0	0	0
2011	ATL	**16**	0	18	13	5	2.0	3	0	0	0	0	0	**1**	**1**	0	0
2012	ATL	**16**	9	32	21	**11**	**3.0**	4	0	0	0	0	0	**1**	0	0	0
2013	OAK	15	**15**	**40**	**29**	**11**	**3.0**	**7**	0	0	0	0	0	0	0	0	0
2014	KAN	**16**	2	19	14	5	2.0	3	0	0	0	0	0	0	0	0	0
2015	DEN	15	4	33	23	10	2.0	3	0	0	0	0	0	0	0	0	0
		104	32	172	119	53	12.0	25	0	0	0	0	2	2	1	0	0

=== Playoffs ===
Year	Team	Games		Tackles					Interceptions					Fumbles			
Year	Team	GP	GS	Cmb	Solo	Ast	Sck	TFL	Int	Yds	TD	Lng	PD	FF	FR	Yds	TD
2010	ATL	1	0	0	0	0	0.0	0	0	0	0	0	0	0	0	0	0
2011	ATL	1	0	0	0	0	0.0	0	0	0	0	0	0	0	0	0	0
2012	ATL	2	**2**	**6**	**4**	**2**	**1.0**	**2**	0	0	0	0	0	0	0	0	0
2015	DEN	**3**	0	5	3	**2**	0.0	0	0	0	0	0	0	0	0	0	0
		7	2	11	7	4	1.0	2	0	0	0	0	0	0	0	0	0
