= Garrett Reynolds =

American football player (born 1987)

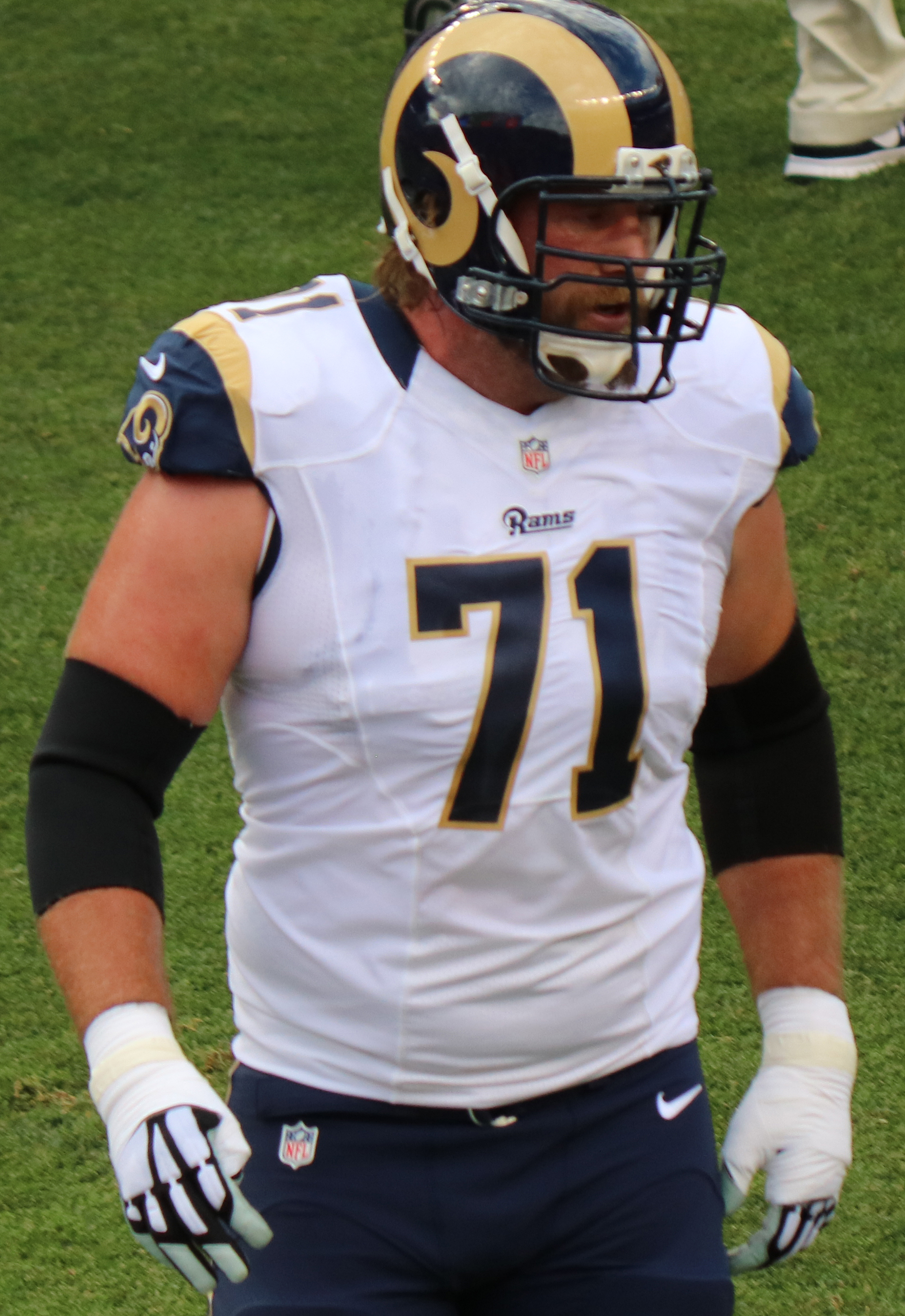
- Reynolds in the 2016 NFL preseason

No. 75, 70, 71, 73
- Position: Offensive guard

Personal information
- Born: July 1, 1987 (age 39); Knoxville, Tennessee, U.S.
- Listed height: 6 ft 8 in (2.03 m)
- Listed weight: 310 lb (141 kg)

Career information
- High school: Strawberry Plains (TN) Carter
- College: North Carolina
- NFL draft: 2009: 5th round, 156th overall pick

Career history
- Atlanta Falcons (2009–2013); Detroit Lions (2014); St. Louis Rams (2015); Detroit Lions (2016)

Awards and highlights
- Second-team All-ACC (2008)

Career NFL statistics
- Games played: 68
- Games started: 38
- Stats at Pro Football Reference

Garrett Reynolds (born July 1, 1987) is an American former professional football player who was an offensive guard in the National Football League (NFL). He played college football for the North Carolina Tar Heels and is the nephew of former Los Angeles Rams and San Francisco 49ers linebacker Jack “Hacksaw” Reynolds.

== Professional career ==
Pre-draft measurables
Height	Weight	Arm length	Hand span	40-yard dash	10-yard split	20-yard split	20-yard shuttle	Three-cone drill	Vertical jump	Broad jump	Bench press
6 ft 7 5/8 in (2.02 m)	309 lb (140 kg)	34 in (0.86 m)	9 1/4 in (0.23 m)	5.32 s	1.75 s	3.03 s	4.88 s	7.87 s	22 in (0.56 m)	7 ft 10 in (2.39 m)	19 reps
All values are from NFL Combine/Pro Day

=== Atlanta Falcons ===
Reynolds was selected by the Atlanta Falcons in the fifth round, 156th overall, in the 2009 NFL draft.

=== Detroit Lions (first stint) ===
On July 17, 2014, Reynolds was signed by the Lions. He was released on August 30, 2014, but was re-signed on September 10, 2014. He played in ten games, of which he started four, with the Lions in 2014.

=== St. Louis / Los Angeles Rams ===
Reynolds signed with the St. Louis Rams on March 18, 2015. He started 11 games for the Rams in 2015. On September 3, 2016, Reynolds was placed on injured reserve. He was later released from IR on September 9.

=== Detroit Lions (second stint) ===
On January 3, 2017, Reynolds was signed by the Lions.
