= Macho Harris =

American football player (born 1986)

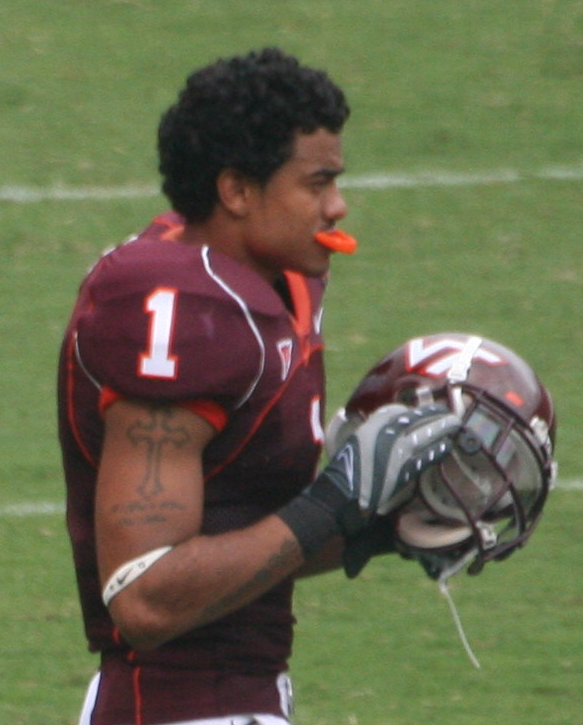
- Harris with Virginia Tech in 2007

No. 35, 20
- Position: Safety / Cornerback

Personal information
- Born: February 16, 1986 (age 40); Highland Springs, Virginia, U.S.
- Listed height: 6 ft 0 in (1.83 m)
- Listed weight: 200 lb (91 kg)

Career information
- High school: Highland Springs
- College: Virginia Tech
- NFL draft: 2009: 5th round, 157th overall pick

Career history
- Philadelphia Eagles (2009); Washington Redskins (2010); Pittsburgh Steelers (2011)*; Saskatchewan Roughriders (2012–2015); Winnipeg Blue Bombers (2016)
- * Offseason or practice squad member only

Awards and highlights
- First-team All-American (2008); 2× First-team All-ACC (2007, 2008)

Career NFL statistics
- Total tackles: 44
- Pass deflections: 2
- Stats at Pro Football Reference
- Stats at CFL.ca (archive)

Victor "Macho" Harris, Jr. (born February 16, 1986) is an American former professional football player who was a defensive back in the National Football League (NFL) and Canadian Football League (CFL). He played college football for the Virginia Tech Hokies and was selected by the Philadelphia Eagles in the fifth round of the 2009 NFL draft. Harris was also a member of the Washington Redskins and Pittsburgh Steelers of the NFL and the CFL's Saskatchewan Roughriders and Winnipeg Blue Bombers.

== Early life ==
Victor "Macho" Harris earned All-District, All-Region, All-Metro, All-State, Parade All-American, and U.S Army All-American Honors while playing Running Back, Kick Returner, Punt Returner, and Safety at Highland Springs High School in Highland Springs, Virginia. In his Junior year, Harris rushed for 2,346 yards and 27 touchdowns and finished his high school career as the central regions career leader in rushing yards at that time. Harris was rated the #1 High School football player coming out of Virginia in 2005.

== College career ==
Harris started as the Virginia Tech Hokies' number one cornerback, playing the boundary position. During his junior year, he was a first-team all-ACC selection. He had five career touchdowns with Virginia Tech: a 72-yard interception return against Cincinnati in 2006, a 100-yard kickoff return against Clemson, an interception return against East Carolina University in 2007 as well as interception returns against Boston College and Duke in 2008. Harris had a total of 15 career interceptions during his career at Virginia Tech. He previously had announced his intentions to leave early and enter the 2008 NFL draft, but subsequently changed his mind and returned for his senior season.

In August of 2021, it was announced that Harris would be inducted into the Virginia Tech Sports Hall of Fame. Harris was formally inducted in November of 2021.

== Professional career ==
=== Pre-draft ===
At the 2009 NFL Scouting Combine, Harris recorded 3.98 seconds in the 20-yard shuttle, and 6.68 seconds in the 3 cone drill. His time in the 20-yard shuttle was the second best among cornerbacks, and his time in the 3 cone drill tied for second.

=== Philadelphia Eagles ===
==== 2009 season ====
Harris was selected by the Philadelphia Eagles in the fifth round (157th overall) of the 2009 NFL draft. He opened the 2009 NFL regular season as the starting free safety, beating out Quintin Demps for the job. He was eventually replaced in the starting lineup by Sean Jones. However, the two split the majority of the playing time, and Harris eventually took back the starting position for final two games of the season: against the Dallas Cowboys in Week 17 and in the NFC Wild Card Round playoff game.

==== 2010 season ====
Because Sean Jones was not re-signed in the offseason, Harris was projected to compete for the starting free safety job with Marlin Jackson, Quintin Demps, and rookie Nate Allen. For the team's preseason mini-camps, however, he took snaps from the cornerback position, the position he played in college. Due to the performance of rookie cornerback Trevard Lindley in the first three preseason games, Harris was switched back to free safety. Harris was waived on September 4.

=== Washington Redskins ===
Harris was signed by the Washington Redskins on November 23, 2010. After playing in three games in 2010, he was waived on July 30, 2011.

=== Pittsburgh Steelers ===
On August 17, 2011, Harris signed with the Pittsburgh Steelers. He waived for final cuts on September 2, 2011.

=== Saskatchewan Roughriders ===
Harris signed with the Saskatchewan Roughriders of the Canadian Football League (CFL) on April 19, 2012. He was released during final cuts on June 24, 2012. Nevertheless, Harris returned to the Riders roster for the 2012 season, recording 7 tackles in 2 games. Harris saw more playing time in his second season in the CFL, collecting 23 tackles and his first career interception. Macho Harris started 16 of 18 regular-season games at defensive back for the Roughriders in 2014, posting a career best 61 tackles, 2 sacks, and 1 fumble recovery. On March 23, 2015, the Riders announced they had signed Harris to a contract extension.

In Week 14 of the 2015 CFL Season, Harris had arguably the greatest game of his CFL career, recording 3 interceptions (including a 50-yard pick six) while also recording 3 tackles in a Roughrider win over the Alouettes. Harris's 3 interceptions tied a Roughrider record for the most interceptions in a game.

=== Winnipeg Blue Bombers ===
Harris played for the Winnipeg Blue Bombers of the CFL in 2016.

== Personal ==
Macho is the son of Victor Harris and the late Maritza Harris. He lives in Regina, Saskatchewan with his wife Kylie Harris and they recently had a baby girl named Kamila Harris. His father gave him the nickname "Macho" at the age of 2.
