= Darryl Richard (American football) =

American football player (born 1986)

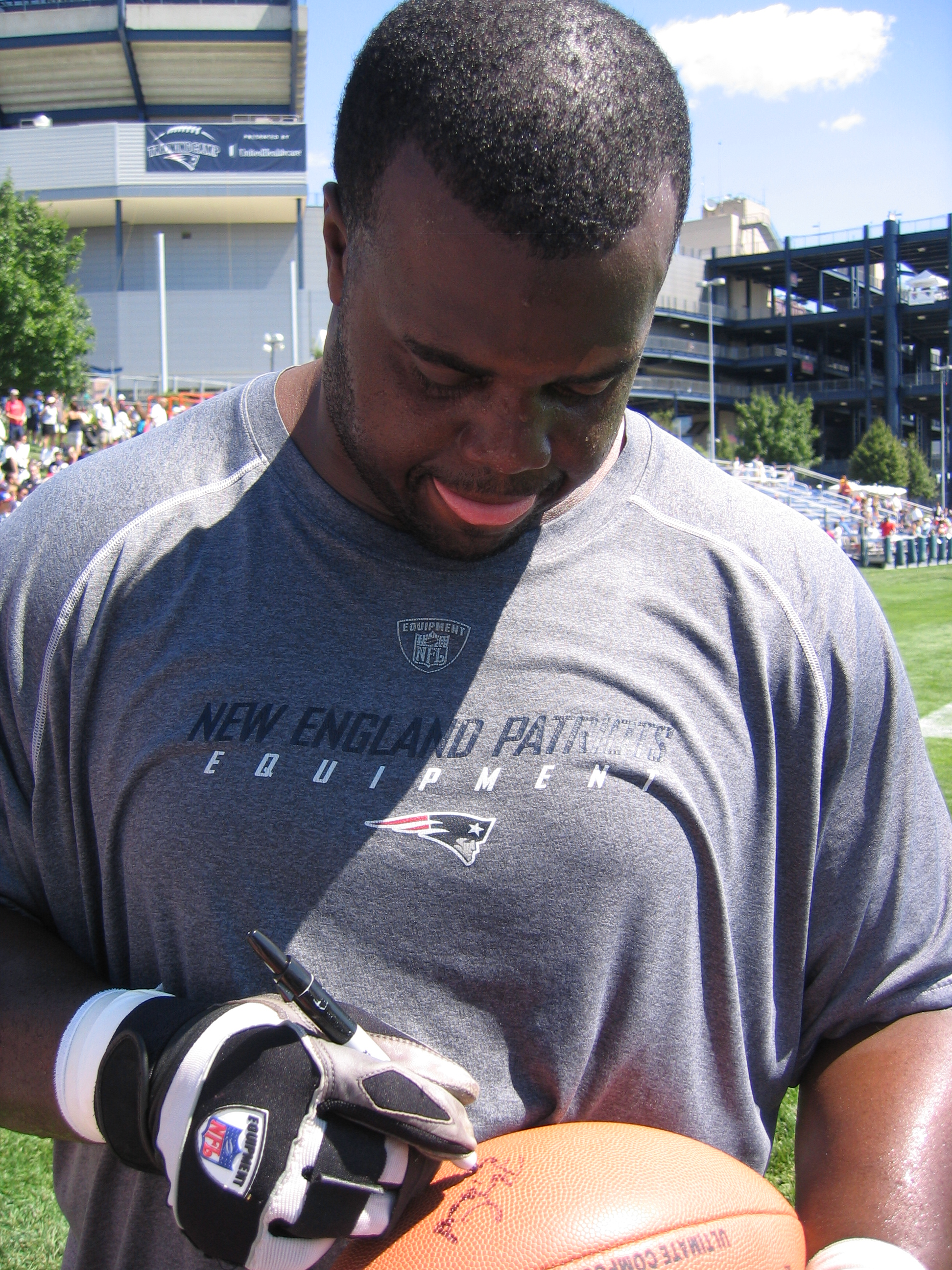
- Richard with the New England Patriots in 2010

No. 90
- Position: Defensive tackle

Personal information
- Born: June 17, 1986 (age 40); St. Rose, Louisiana, U.S.
- Listed height: 6 ft 3 in (1.91 m)
- Listed weight: 303 lb (137 kg)

Career information
- High school: Destrehan (Destrehan, Louisiana)
- College: Georgia Tech
- NFL draft: 2009: 7th round, 234th overall pick

Career history
- New England Patriots (2009–2010)

Awards and highlights
- Second-team All-ACC (2008)
- Stats at Pro Football Reference

Darryl Richard II (born June 17, 1986) is an American former professional football player who was a defensive tackle in the National Football League (NFL). He was selected by the New England Patriots in the seventh round of the 2009 NFL draft. He played college football for the Georgia Tech Yellow Jackets.

== Early life ==
Richard lived in St. Rose, Louisiana and attended Destrehan High School in Destrehan, Louisiana, where he played football as a defensive tackle, graduating in 2004 as his class valedictorian. He was a finalist for the Franklin D. Watkins Memorial Trophy in 2004, presented by the National Alliance of African American Athletes. As a senior, he played in the United States Army All-American game.

== College career ==
Richard attended the Georgia Institute of Technology, where he earned his degree in management in three years, before earning his MBA in December 2008. As a freshman, he recorded four sacks and started the final four games of the season. After redshirting his sophomore season in 2005 due to an injury, Richard recorded 20 tackles in 2006 and was named to the Atlantic Coast Conference All-Academic team. He started all 13 games at defensive tackle in his junior season in 2007, tallying four and a half sacks on the season. In his final season in 2008, Richard was named second-team All-ACC, and was a finalist for the NCCA Draddy Trophy for student-athletes. He was named to the East-West Shrine Game after the season before entering the 2009 NFL draft. In the Wonderlic Test for intelligence administered as part of the draft scouting process, Richard scored the highest among all defensive linemen who took the test.

== Professional career ==
Richard was selected by the Patriots in the seventh round (234th overall) of the 2009 NFL draft. On July 16, he was signed to a four-year contract. He was waived by the Patriots on September 5, and re-signed to the team's practice squad the next day. In mid-season, the Patriots raised Richard's salary in mid-season from the practice squad minimum (about $150,000) to that of a first-year active roster player ($310,000). After spending the entire season on the practice squad, Richard was re-signed to a future contract on January 12, 2010. He was placed on injured reserve on August 31, 2010, with a foot injury. He was waived by New England again on September 2, 2011.
