= Darell Scott =

American football player (born 1986)

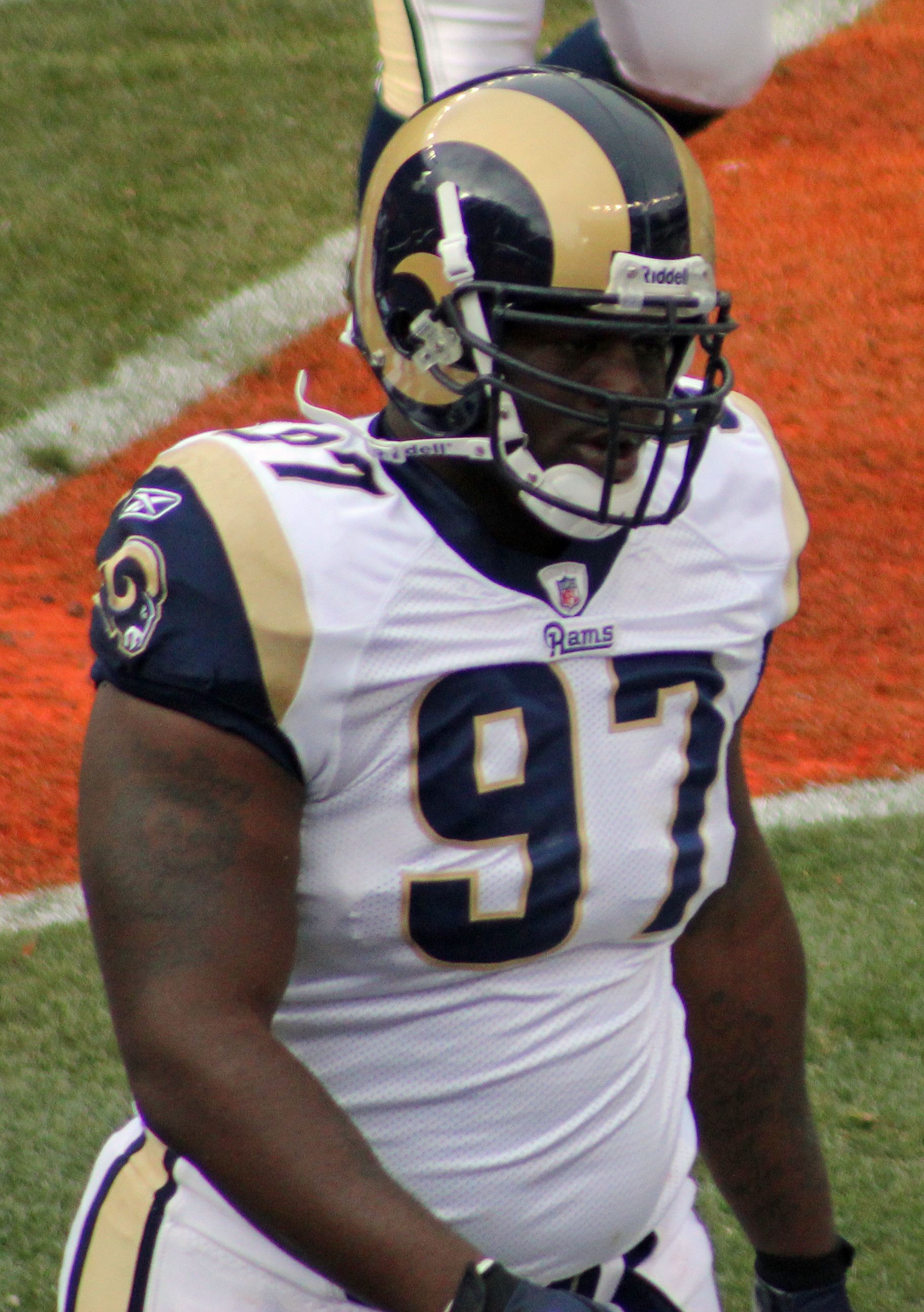
- Scott with the St. Louis Rams in 2010

No. 97
- Position: Defensive tackle

Personal information
- Born: March 15, 1986 (age 40); Columbia, South Carolina, U.S.
- Listed height: 6 ft 3 in (1.91 m)
- Listed weight: 315 lb (143 kg)

Career information
- High school: Ridge View (Columbia)
- College: Clemson
- NFL draft: 2009: 4th round, 103rd overall pick

Career history
- St. Louis Rams (2009–2012)

Career NFL statistics
- Total tackles: 54
- Fumble recoveries: 1
- Stats at Pro Football Reference

Darell Scott (born March 15, 1986) is an American former professional football player who was a defensive tackle in the National Football League (NFL). He played college football for the Clemson Tigers and was selected by the St. Louis Rams in the fourth round of the 2009 NFL draft.

== Early life ==
Scott was a three-year starter at Ridge View High School in Columbia, South Carolina, where he had 242 career tackles, 31 tackles for loss, seven sacks, 35 quarterback pressures, four caused fumbles, six recovered fumbles, and one defensive touchdown. He was named team defensive MVP after his sophomore, junior, and senior seasons. As a senior, he had 101 tackles, 12 tackles for loss, and a 90-percent grade as a lineman on offense. Scott had 70 tackles, five tackles for loss, three caused fumbles, and three recovered fumbles as a junior and had 71 tackles and 13 tackles for loss as a sophomore. After his senior year he was a Shrine Bowl selection

== College career ==
Scott started his final 38 games, appearing in 50 contests while participating in a total of 1,501 plays recording 161 tackles (103 solo) with nine sacks, 18.5 stops for losses and 36 quarterback pressures and had one interception, two pass deflections, two fumble recoveries and a forced fumble.

He red-shirted as a freshman in 2004. In the 2005 football season he had 18 tackles in nine game and had two sacks and 10 quarterback pressure and recovered two fumbles. 2006: Started all 13 games at defensive tackle and recorded 54 tackles. In 2007, he was third among Tiger defensive linemen in tackles (50) while starting all 13 games for and also had three sacks, third-most on the team. As a senior in 2008 Scott had 39 tackles (7.5 for losses) and one sack while playing and starting all 12 games while deflecting a pass and recovering a fumble.

== Professional career ==
Pre-draft measurables
Height	Weight	Arm length	Hand span	40-yard dash	10-yard split	20-yard split	20-yard shuttle	Three-cone drill	Vertical jump	Broad jump	Bench press	Wonderlic
6 ft 3 1/4 in (1.91 m)	312 lb (142 kg)	32 1/4 in (0.82 m)	9 7/8 in (0.25 m)	4.92 s	1.65 s	2.82 s	4.84 s	8.28 s	30 1/2 in (0.77 m)	8 ft 11 in (2.72 m)	29 reps	22
All values from NFL Combine.

Scott was selected by the Rams in the fourth round of the 2009 NFL draft with the 103rd overall pick. He was on the active roster since the beginning of the 2009 NFL season, but was inactive from Week 2 through Week 6. By week 11 he was the a starting defensive tackle for the Rams. He was released by the Rams on September 13, 2012.
