= 2009 NFL draft =

2009 American football draft

General information
- Date: April 25–26, 2009
- Time: 4:00 pm EDT (April 25); 10:00 am EDT (April 26)
- Location: Radio City Music Hall in New York City, New York
- Networks: ESPN, NFL Network

Overview
- 256 total selections in 7 rounds
- League: NFL
- First selection: Matthew Stafford, QB; Detroit Lions
- Mr. Irrelevant: Ryan Succop, K Kansas City Chiefs
- Most selections (12): Dallas Cowboys; New England Patriots
- Fewest selections (3): New York Jets

The 2009 NFL draft was the 74th annual meeting of National Football League (NFL) franchises to select newly eligible football players. The draft took place at Radio City Music Hall in New York City, New York, on April 25 and 26, 2009. The draft consisted of two rounds on the first day, starting at 4:00 pm EDT, and five rounds on the second day, starting at 10:00 am EDT. To compensate for the time change from the previous year and in an effort to help shorten the draft, teams were no longer on the clock for 15 minutes in the first round and 10 minutes in the second round. Each team now had 10 minutes to make their selection in the first round and seven minutes in the second round. Rounds three through seven were shortened to five minutes per team. This was the first year that the NFL used this format and it was changed again the following year for the 2010 NFL draft. The 2009 NFL draft was televised by both NFL Network and ESPN and was the first to have cheerleaders. The Detroit Lions, who became the first team in NFL history to finish a season at 0–16, used the first selection in the draft to select University of Georgia quarterback Matthew Stafford.

It was the first draft since 1983 that saw two centers being selected in the first round—Alex Mack at No. 21 to the Browns, and Eric Wood at No. 28 to the Bills. It was also the first time since the 1993 draft that a Miami Hurricanes player was not selected in the first round. As of the end of the 2018 season, the 2009 draft has seen 11 of the 32 first-round selections make the Pro Bowl, and 27 (including three punters) in total for the entire class. It has been referred to as one of the worst drafts in league history. This was the first time that a Mr. Irrelevant went on to win a Super Bowl (Ryan Succop).

As of 2025, the only remaining active players in the NFL from the 2009 draft class are Rams quarterback Matthew Stafford, 49ers punter Thomas Morstead, and Giants placekicker Graham Gano.

== Overview ==
The following is the breakdown of the 256 players selected by position:

- 36 cornerbacks
- 34 wide receivers
- 23 defensive ends
- 23 linebackers
- 21 safeties
- 20 defensive tackles
- 20 offensive tackles
- 19 running backs
- 20 tight ends
- 13 guards
- 11 quarterbacks
- 7 centers
- 3 punters
- 2 fullbacks
- 2 kickers
- 1 long snapper

== Player selections ==
*	compensatory selection
^	supplemental compensatory selection
^{†}	Pro Bowler

Positions key
Offense	Defense	Special teams
QB — Quarterback; RB — Running back; FB — Fullback; WR — Wide receiver; TE — Tight end; OL — Offensive lineman; T — Tackle; G — Guard; C — Center	DL — Defensive lineman; DT — Defensive tackle (Note: Includes nose tackle (NT)); DE — Defensive end; EDGE — Edge rusher; LB — Linebacker (Note: Includes middle linebacker (MLB/MIKE), weakside linebacker (WILL), strongside linebacker (SAM), off-ball linebacker, and outside linebacker (OLB)); DB — Defensive back; CB — Cornerback; S — Safety (Note: Includes free safety (FS) and strong safety (SS))	K — Kicker (Note: Also known as a placekicker (PK)); P — Punter; LS — Long snapper; RS — Return specialist (Note: Includes kickoff and punt returners)

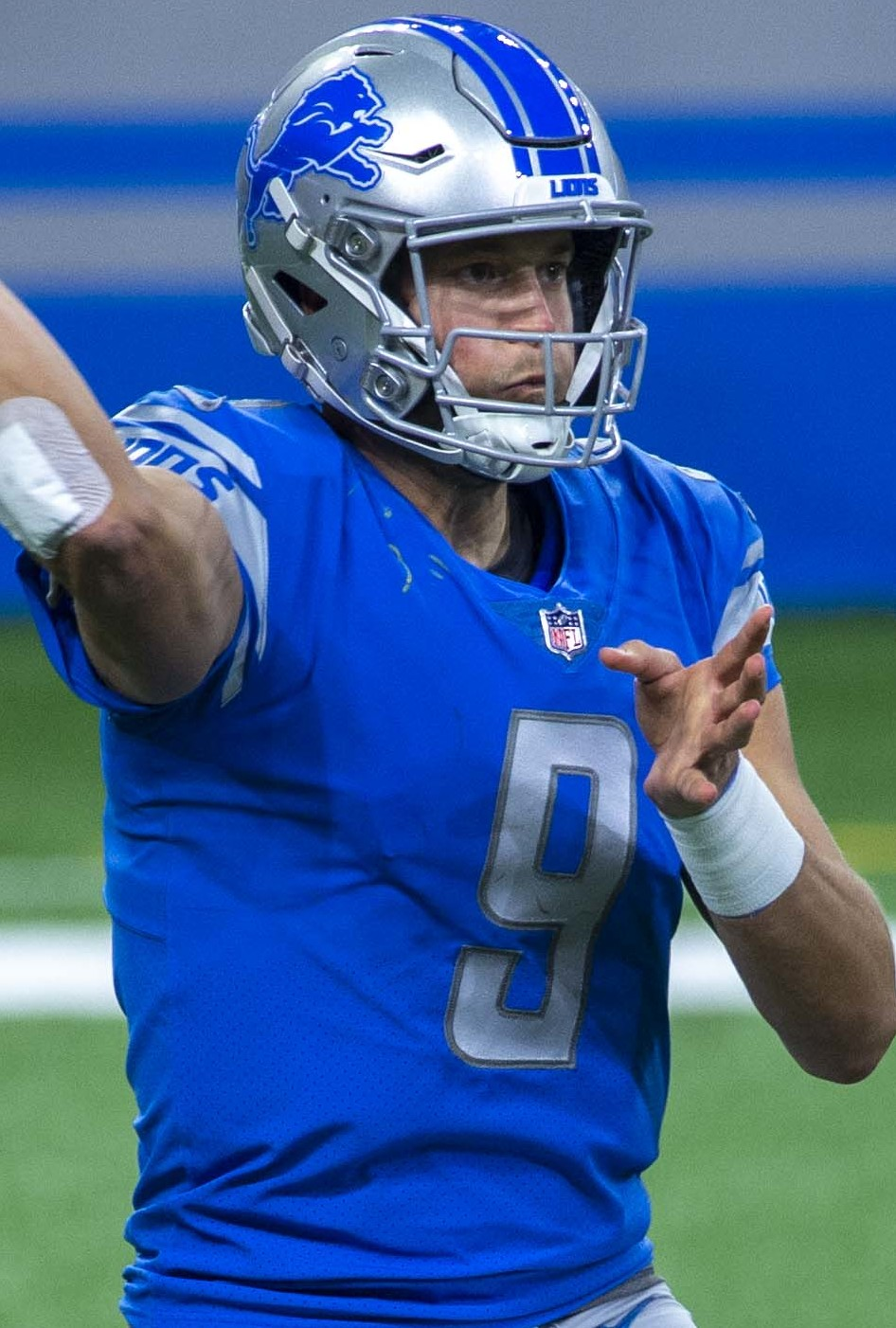
First overall pick and the 2025 NFL Most Valuable Player Matthew Stafford is the fastest quarterback to reach 40,000 passing yards in NFL history and led the Los Angeles Rams to a victory in Super Bowl LVI.

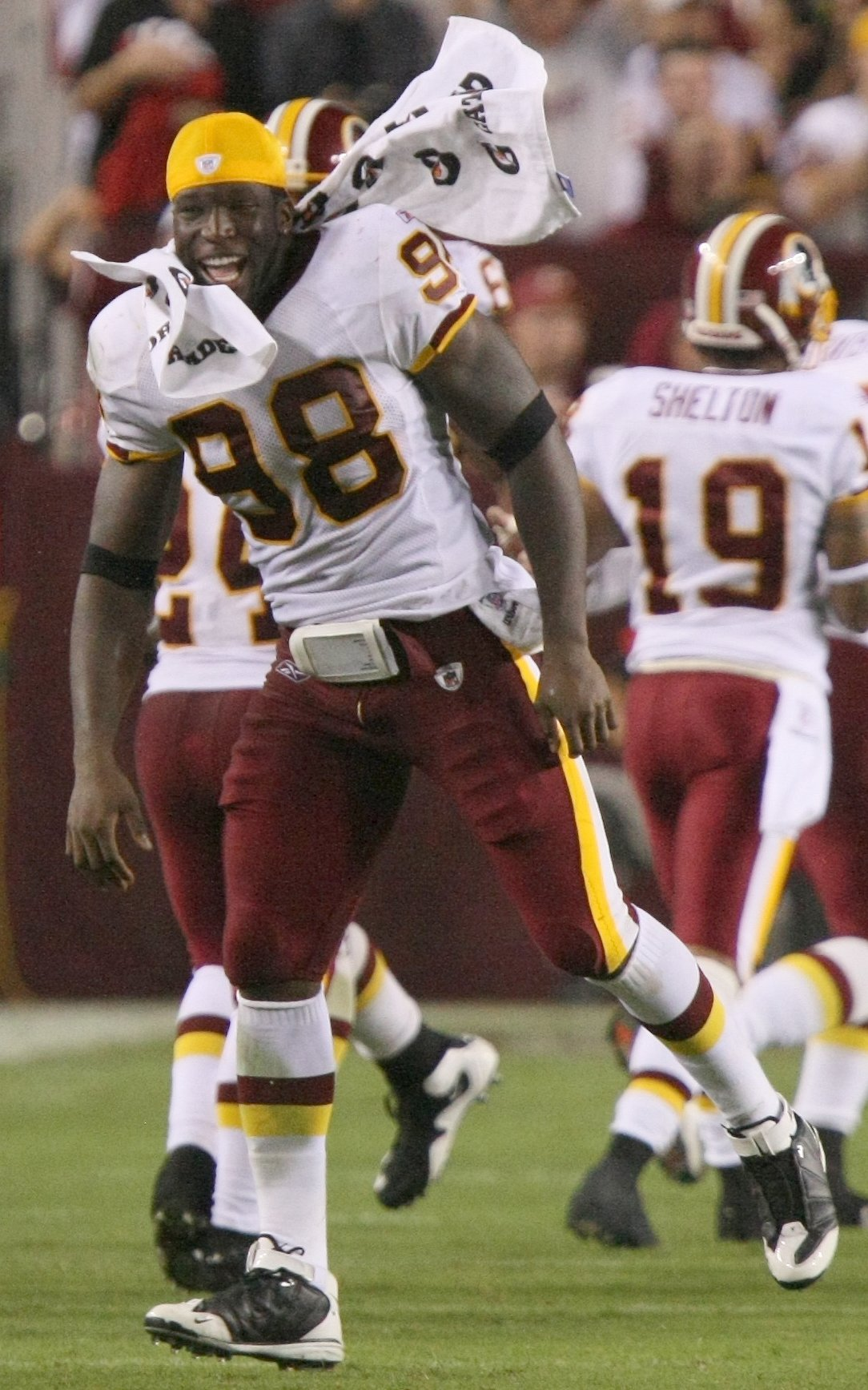
Linebacker Brian Orakpo, taken 13th overall, was a 4-time Pro Bowl selection.

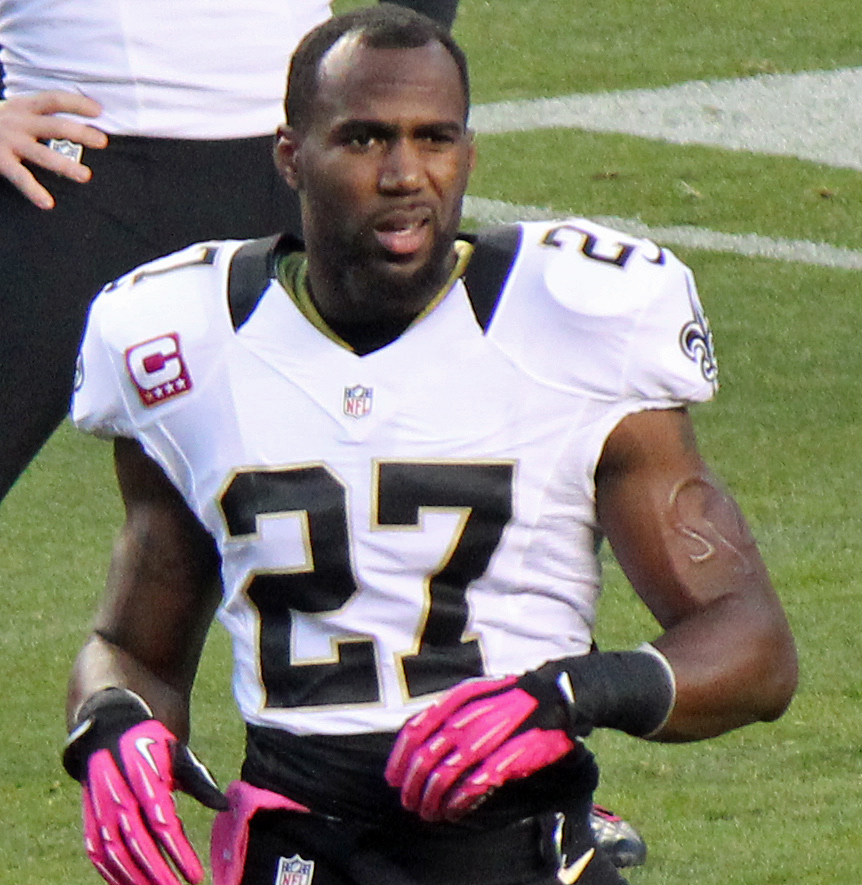
Cornerback Malcolm Jenkins, drafted 14th overall, won two Super Bowls with two different teams and was named to 3 Pro Bowls.

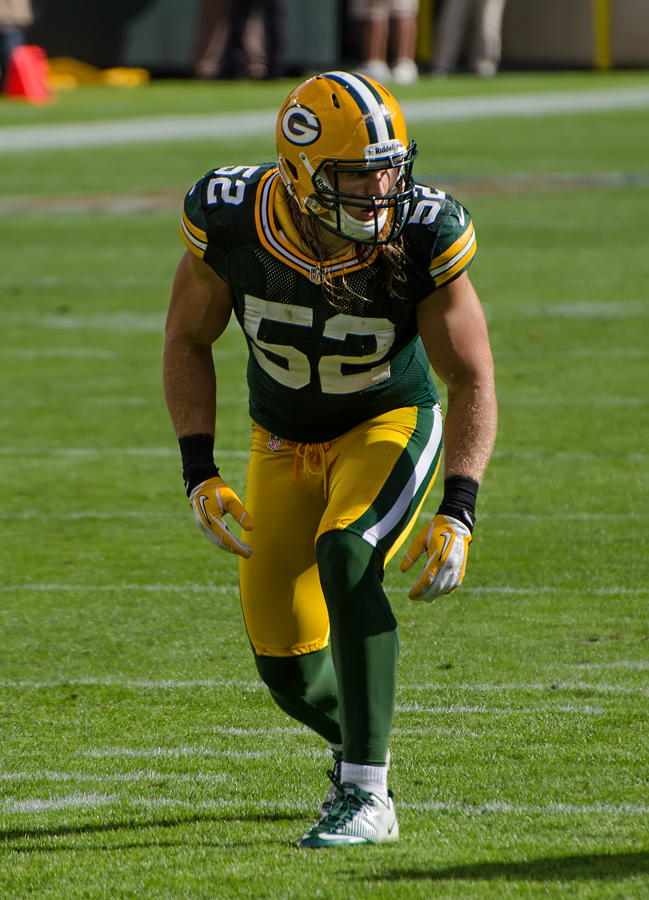
Linebacker Clay Matthews III, picked 26th overall, is a member of the Matthews family of football players and was one of the league's premier pass-rushers throughout his career.

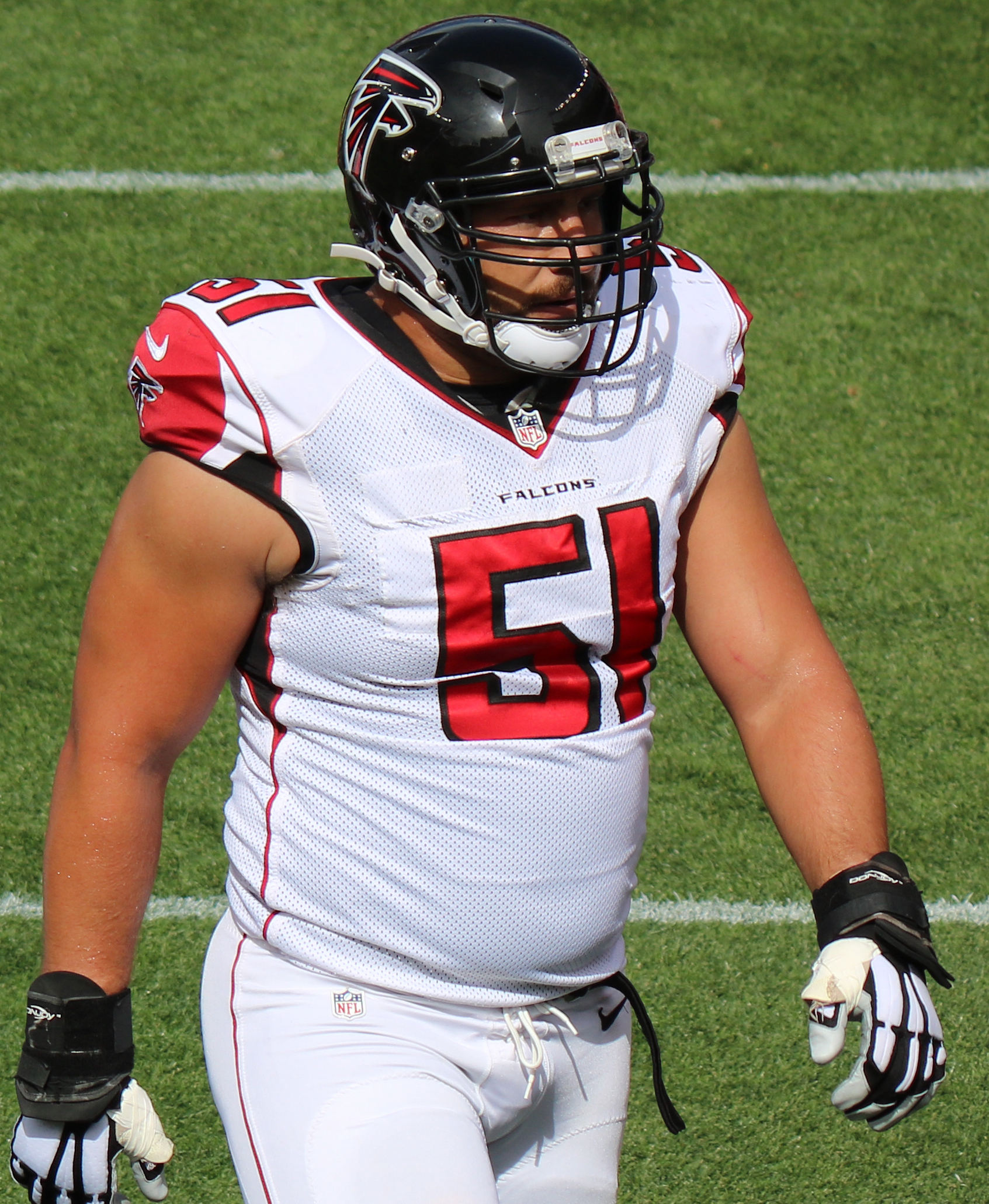
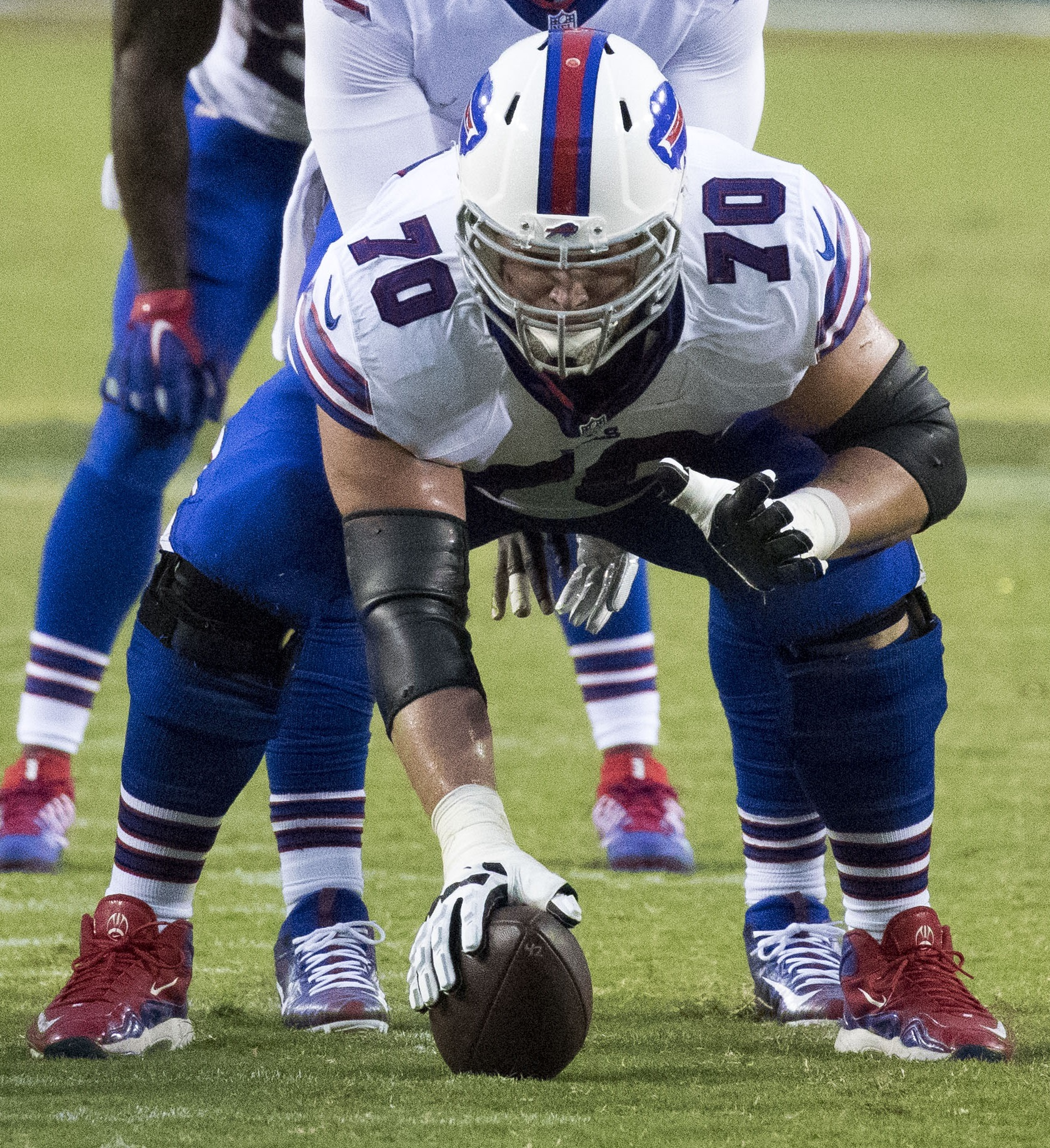
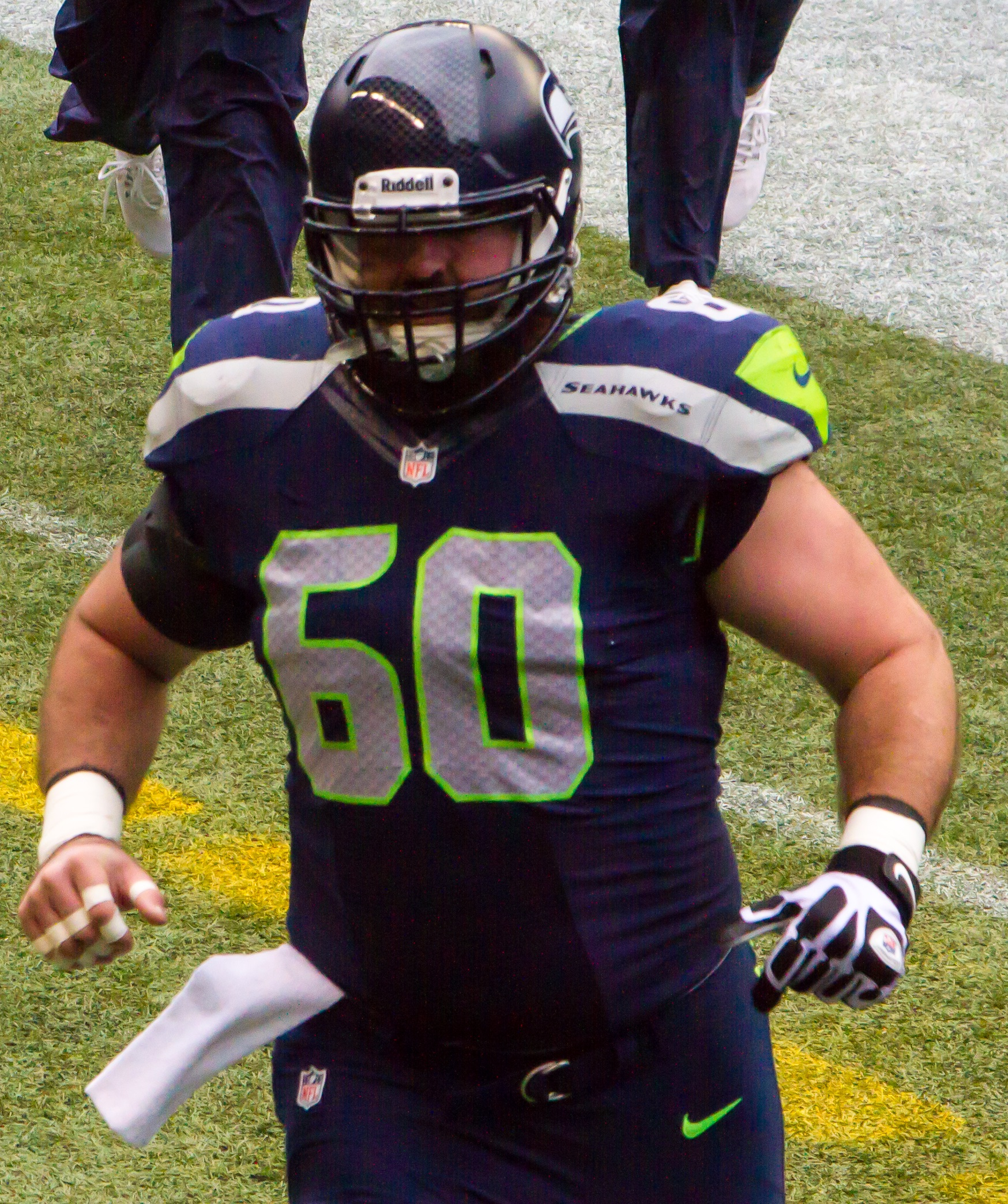
Prominent centers taken in this draft (from top to bottom): Alex Mack, Eric Wood, and Max Unger.

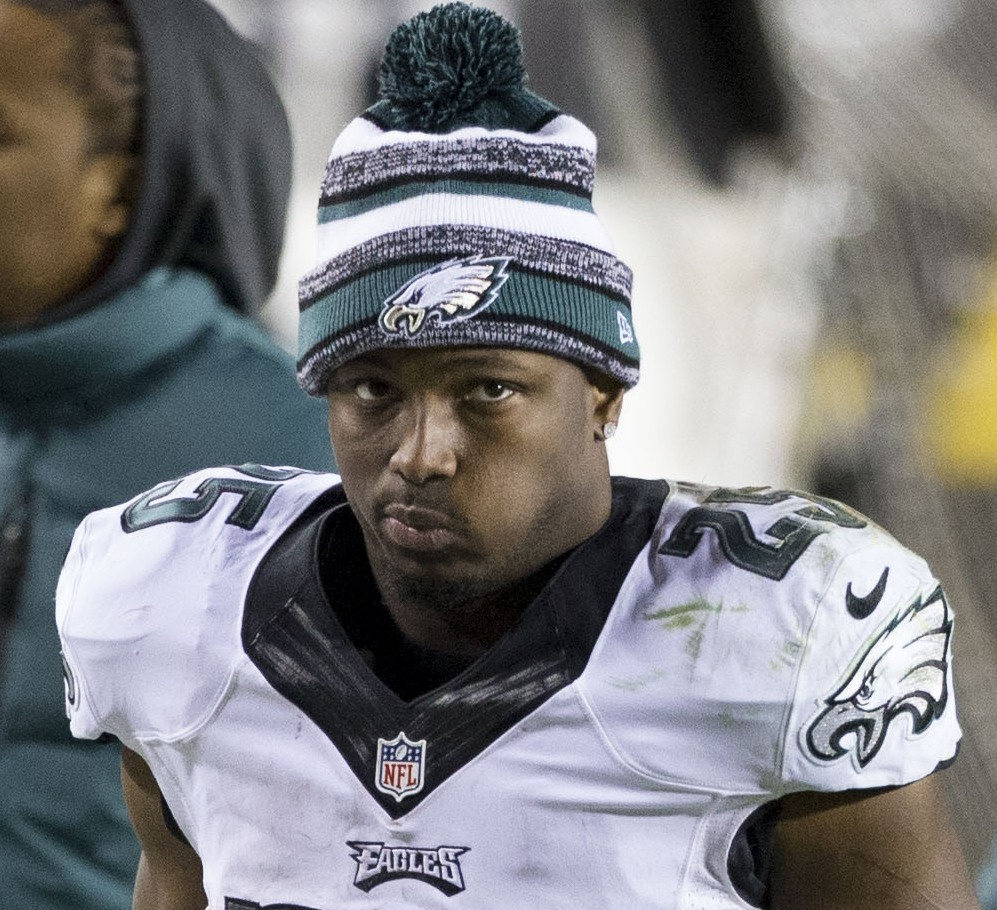
Running back LeSean McCoy, drafted in the second round, is the Philadelphia Eagles' leader in career rushing yards, a two-time All-Pro, a six-time Pro Bowler and a two-time Super Bowl champion.

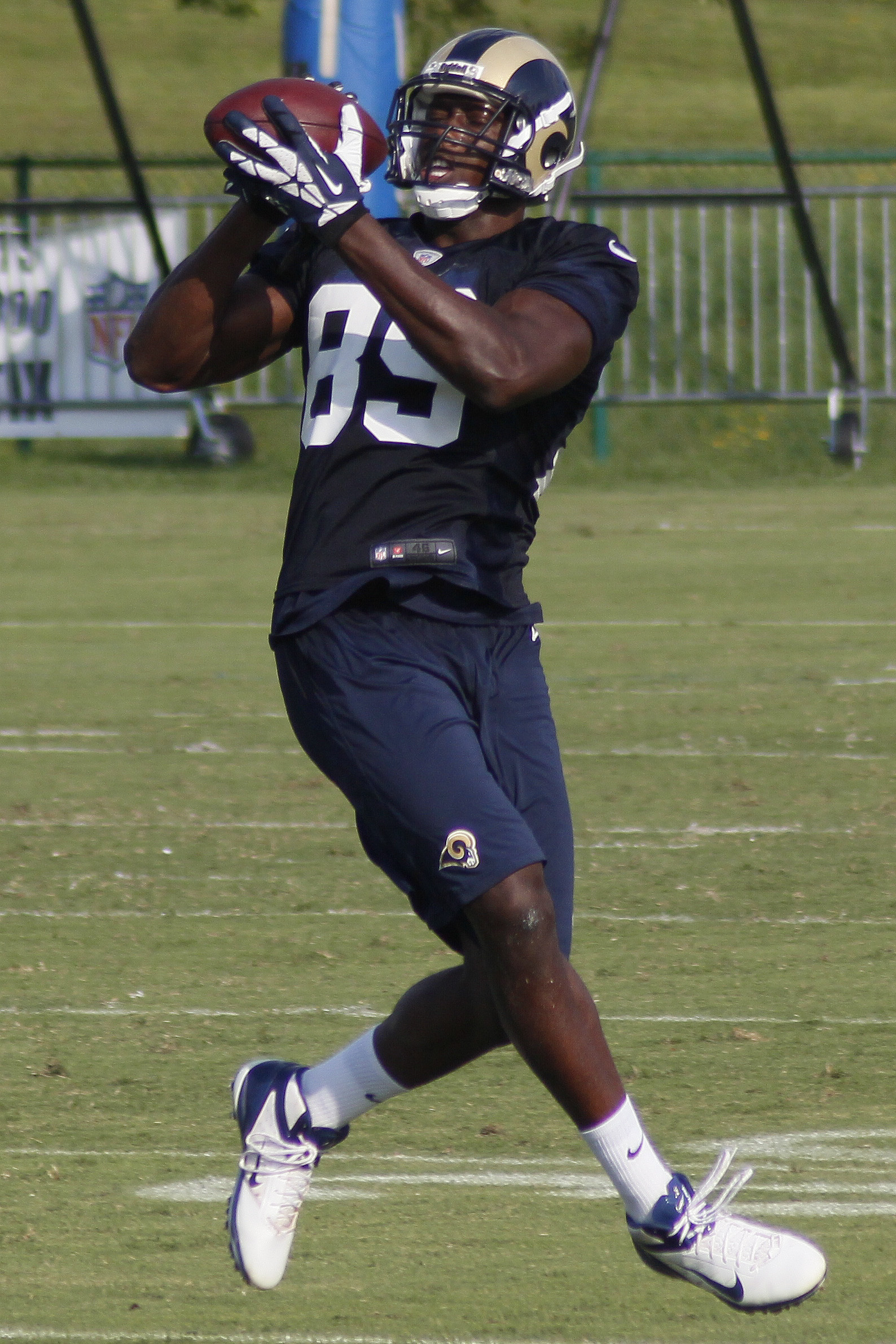
Tight end Jared Cook, drafted in the third round, is a two-time Pro Bowl selection.

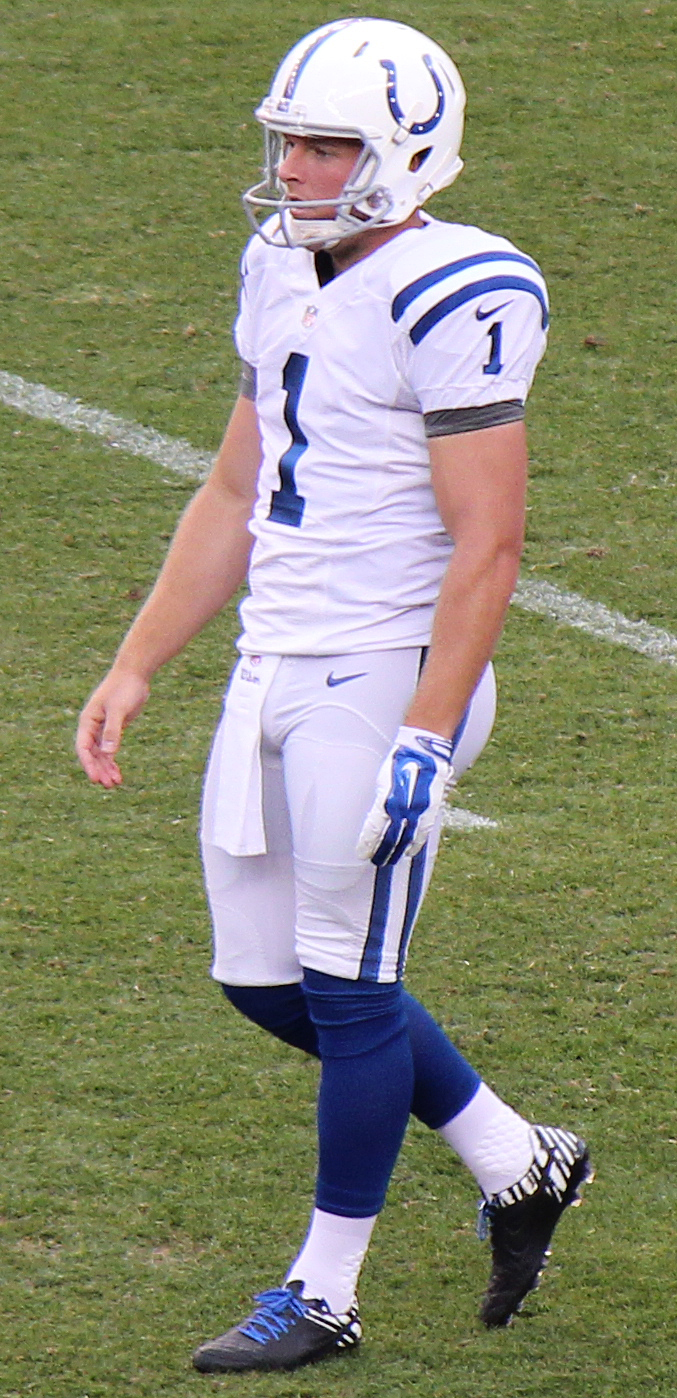
Punter Pat McAfee, selected in the seventh round, was a two-time Pro Bowl selection and All-Pro for the Indianapolis Colts.

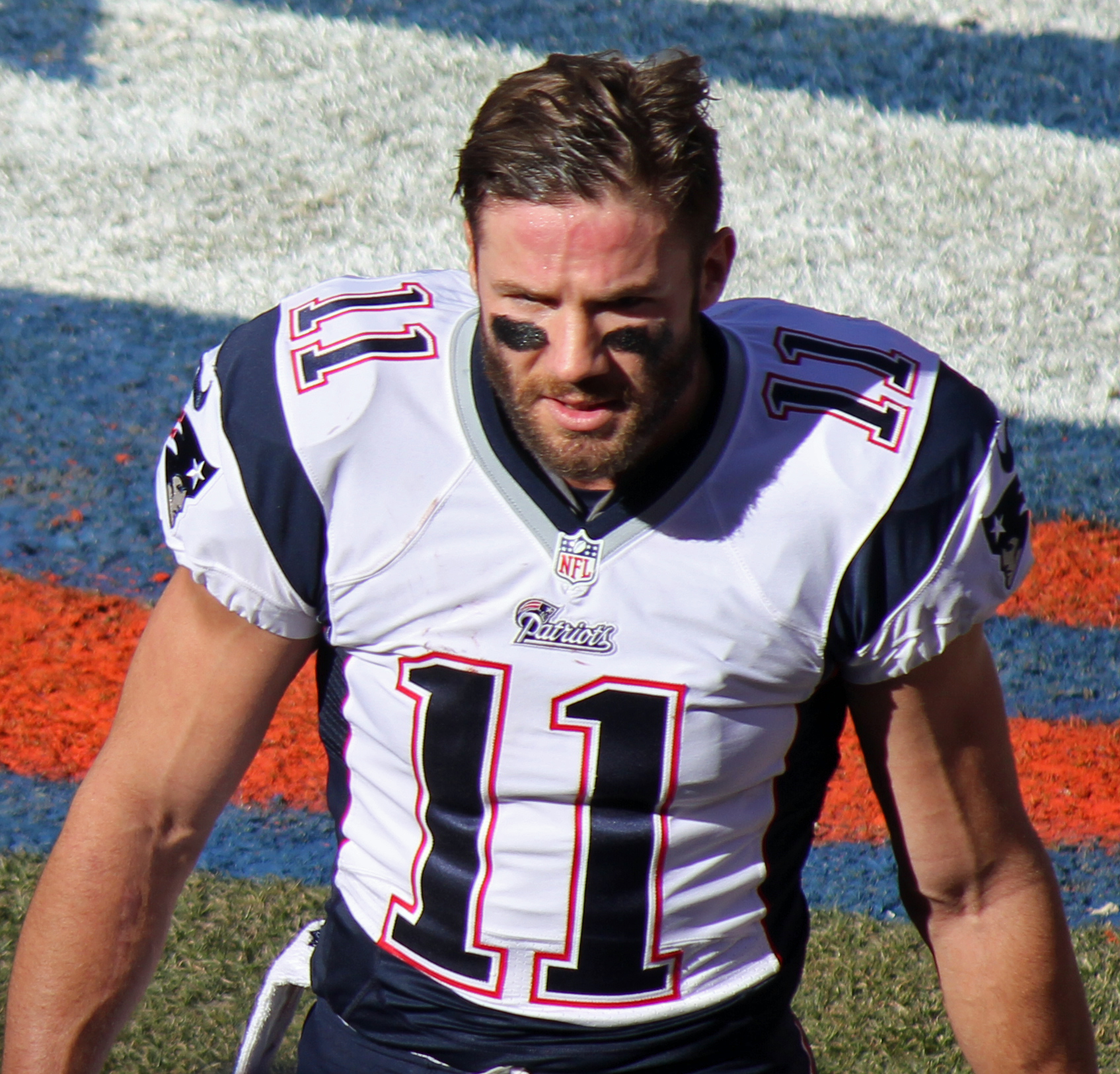
Slot receiver Julian Edelman, drafted in the seventh round, won three Super Bowls with the New England Patriots, and was selected as MVP of Super Bowl LIII.

Rnd.	Pick	Team	Player	Pos.	College	Notes
1	1	Detroit Lions	Matthew Stafford ^{†}	QB	Georgia	
1	2	St. Louis Rams	Jason Smith	T	Baylor	
1	3	Kansas City Chiefs	Tyson Jackson	DE	LSU	
1	4	Seattle Seahawks	Aaron Curry	LB	Wake Forest	
1	5	New York Jets	Mark Sanchez	QB	USC	from Cleveland (Note: No. 5: Cleveland → NY Jets (D). Cleveland traded a first-round selection (5th overall) to the NY Jets in exchange for first- and second-round selections (17th and 52nd overall), DE Kenyon Coleman, QB Brett Ratliff and S Abram Elam. (Note: "Jets move up in draft to grab QB Sanchez". WJZ-TV. April 25, 2008.))
1	6	Cincinnati Bengals	Andre Smith	T	Alabama	
1	7	Oakland Raiders	Darrius Heyward-Bey	WR	Maryland	
1	8	Jacksonville Jaguars	Eugene Monroe	T	Virginia	
1	9	Green Bay Packers	B. J. Raji ^{†}	DT	Boston College	
1	10	San Francisco 49ers	Michael Crabtree	WR	Texas Tech	
1	11	Buffalo Bills	Aaron Maybin	LB	Penn State	
1	12	Denver Broncos	Knowshon Moreno	RB	Georgia	
1	13	Washington Redskins	Brian Orakpo ^{†}	OLB	Texas	
1	14	New Orleans Saints	Malcolm Jenkins ^{†}	CB	Ohio State	
1	15	Houston Texans	Brian Cushing ^{†}	LB	USC	
1	16	San Diego Chargers	Larry English	DE	Northern Illinois	
1	17	Tampa Bay Buccaneers	Josh Freeman	QB	Kansas State	from NY Jets via Cleveland (Note: No. 17: NY Jets → Cleveland → Tampa Bay. Multiple trades: NY Jets → Cleveland (D). See Round 1: Cleveland → NY Jets. Cleveland → Tampa Bay (D). Cleveland traded a first-round selection (17th overall) to Tampa Bay in exchange for first- and sixth-round selections (19th and 191st overall).)
1	18	Denver Broncos	Robert Ayers	DE	Tennessee	from Chicago (Note: No. 18: Chicago → Denver (PD). Chicago traded first- and third-round selections (18th and 84th overall), a 2010 first-round selection and QB Kyle Orton to Denver in exchange for a fifth-round selection (140th overall) and QB Jay Cutler.)
1	19	Philadelphia Eagles	Jeremy Maclin ^{†}	WR	Missouri	from Tampa Bay via Cleveland (Note: No. 19: Tampa Bay → Cleveland → Philadelphia. Multiple trades: Tampa Bay → Cleveland (D). See Round 1: Cleveland → Tampa Bay. Cleveland → Philadelphia (D). Cleveland traded a first-round selection (19th overall) to Philadelphia in exchange for first- and sixth-round selections (21st and 195th overall).)
1	20	Detroit Lions	Brandon Pettigrew	TE	Oklahoma State	from Dallas (Note: No. 20: Dallas → Detroit (PD). Dallas traded first-, third- and sixth-round selections (20th, 82nd and 192nd overall) to Detroit in exchange for a seventh-round selection (210th overall) and WR Roy Williams.)
1	21	Cleveland Browns	Alex Mack ^{†}	C	California	from Philadelphia (Note: No. 21: Philadelphia → Cleveland (D). See Round 1: Cleveland → Philadelphia.)
1	22	Minnesota Vikings	Percy Harvin ^{†}	WR	Florida	
1	23	Baltimore Ravens	Michael Oher	T	Ole Miss	from New England (Note: No. 23: New England → Baltimore (D). New England traded a first-round selection (23rd overall) to Baltimore in exchange for first- and fifth-round selections (26th and 162nd overall).)
1	24	Atlanta Falcons	Peria Jerry	DT	Ole Miss	
1	25	Miami Dolphins	Vontae Davis ^{†}	CB	Illinois	
1	26	Green Bay Packers	Clay Matthews ^{†}	LB	USC	from Baltimore via New England (Note: No. 26: Baltimore → New England → Green Bay. Multiple trades: Baltimore → New England (D). See Round 1: New England → Baltimore. New England → Green Bay (D). New England traded first- and fifth-round selections (26th and 162nd overall) to Green Bay in exchange for a second-round selection and two third-round selections (41st, 73rd and 83rd overall).)
1	27	Indianapolis Colts	Donald Brown	RB	Connecticut	
1	28	Buffalo Bills	Eric Wood ^{†}	C	Louisville	from Carolina via Philadelphia (Note: No. 28: Carolina → Philadelphia → Buffalo. Multiple trades: Carolina → Philadelphia (PD). Carolina traded a first-round selection (28th overall), and 2008 second- and fourth-round selections to Philadelphia in exchange for a 2008 first-round selection. Philadelphia → Buffalo (PD). Philadelphia traded first- and fourth-round selections (28th and 121st overall) to Buffalo in exchange for OT Jason Peters.)
1	29	New York Giants	Hakeem Nicks	WR	North Carolina	
1	30	Tennessee Titans	Kenny Britt	WR	Rutgers	
1	31	Arizona Cardinals	Beanie Wells	RB	Ohio State	
1	32	Pittsburgh Steelers	Ziggy Hood	DT	Missouri	
2	33	Detroit Lions	Louis Delmas	S	Western Michigan	
2	34	New England Patriots	Patrick Chung	S	Oregon	from Kansas City (Note: No. 34: Kansas City → New England (PD). Kansas City traded a second-round selection (34th overall) to New England in exchange for QB Matt Cassel and LB Mike Vrabel.)
2	35	St. Louis Rams	James Laurinaitis	LB	Ohio State	
2	36	Cleveland Browns	Brian Robiskie	WR	Ohio State	
2	37	Denver Broncos	Alphonso Smith	CB	Wake Forest	from Seattle (Note: No. 37: Seattle → Denver (D). Seattle traded a second-round selection (37th overall) to Denver in exchange for a 2010 first-round selection.)
2	38	Cincinnati Bengals	Rey Maualuga	LB	USC	
2	39	Jacksonville Jaguars	Eben Britton	T	Arizona	
2	40	New England Patriots	Ron Brace	DT	Boston College	from Oakland (Note: No. 40: Oakland → New England (D). Oakland traded a second-round selection (40th overall) to New England in exchange for second-, fourth- and sixth-round selections (47th, 124th and 199th overall).)
2	41	New England Patriots	Darius Butler	CB	Connecticut	from Green Bay (Note: No. 41: Green Bay → New England (D). See Round 1: New England → Green Bay.)
2	42	Buffalo Bills	Jairus Byrd ^{†}	S	Oregon	
2	43	Carolina Panthers	Everette Brown	DE	Florida State	from San Francisco (Note: No. 43: San Francisco → Carolina (D). San Francisco traded second- and fourth-round selections (43rd and 111th overall) to Carolina in exchange for a 2010 first-round selection.)
2	44	Miami Dolphins	Pat White	QB	West Virginia	from Washington (Note: No. 44: Washington → Miami (PD). Washington traded a second-round selection (44th overall) and a 2010 sixth-round selection to Miami in exchange for DE Jason Taylor.)
2	45	New York Giants	Clint Sintim	LB	Virginia	from New Orleans (Note: No. 45: New Orleans → NY Giants (PD). New Orleans traded second- and fifth-round selections (45th and 151st overall) to the NY Giants in exchange for TE Jeremy Shockey.)
2	46	Houston Texans	Connor Barwin ^{†}	DE	Cincinnati	
2	47	Oakland Raiders	Michael Mitchell	S	Ohio	from San Diego via New England (Note: No. 47: San Diego → New England → Oakland. Multiple trades: San Diego → New England (PD). San Diego traded a second-round selection (47th overall) and a 2008 fifth-round selection to New England in exchange for a 2008 third-round selection (69th overall). New England → Oakland (D). See Round 2: Oakland → New England.)
2	48	Denver Broncos	Darcel McBath	S	Texas Tech	
2	49	Seattle Seahawks	Max Unger ^{†}	C	Oregon	from Chicago (Note: No. 49: Chicago → Seattle (D). Chicago traded a second-round selection (49th overall) to Seattle in exchange for third- and fourth-round selections (68th and 105th overall).)
2	50	Cleveland Browns	Mohamed Massaquoi	WR	Georgia	from Tampa Bay (Note: No. 50: Tampa Bay → Cleveland (PD). Tampa Bay traded a second-round selection (50th overall) and a 2010 fifth-round selection to Cleveland in exchange for TE Kellen Winslow Jr.)
2	51	Buffalo Bills	Andy Levitre	G	Oregon State	from Dallas (Note: No. 51: Dallas → Buffalo (D). Dallas traded a second-round selection (51st overall) to Buffalo in exchange for third- and fourth-round selections (75th and 110th overall).)
2	52	Cleveland Browns	David Veikune	DE	Hawaii	from NY Jets (Note: No. 52: NY Jets → Cleveland (D). See Round 1: Cleveland → NY Jets.)
2	53	Philadelphia Eagles	LeSean McCoy ^{†}	RB	Pittsburgh	
2	54	Minnesota Vikings	Phil Loadholt	T	Oklahoma	
2	55	Atlanta Falcons	William Moore ^{†}	S	Missouri	
2	56	Indianapolis Colts	Fili Moala	DT	USC	from Miami (Note: No. 56: Miami → Indianapolis (D). Miami traded a second-round selection (56th overall) to Indianapolis in exchange for second- and fifth-round selections (61st and 165th overall).)
2	57	Baltimore Ravens	Paul Kruger	DE	Utah	
2	58	New England Patriots	Sebastian Vollmer	T	Houston	
2	59	Carolina Panthers	Sherrod Martin	CB	Troy	
2	60	New York Giants	William Beatty	T	Connecticut	
2	61	Miami Dolphins	Sean Smith	CB	Utah	from Indianapolis (Note: No. 61: Indianapolis → Miami (D). See Round 2: Miami → Indianapolis.)
2	62	Tennessee Titans	Sen'Derrick Marks	DT	Auburn	
2	63	Arizona Cardinals	Cody Brown	DE	Connecticut	
2	64	Denver Broncos	Richard Quinn	TE	North Carolina	from Pittsburgh (Note: No. 64: Pittsburgh → Denver (D). Pittsburgh traded second- and fourth-round selections (64th and 132nd overall) to Denver in exchange for two third-round selections (79th and 84th overall).)
3	65	New York Jets	Shonn Greene	RB	Iowa	from Detroit (Note: No. 65: Detroit → NY Jets (D). Detroit traded a third-round selection (65th overall) to the NY Jets in exchange for third-, fourth- and seventh-round selections (76th, 115th and 228th overall).)
3	66	St. Louis Rams	Bradley Fletcher	CB	Iowa	
3	67	Kansas City Chiefs	Alex Magee	DT	Purdue	
3	68	Chicago Bears	Jarron Gilbert	DT	San Jose State	from Seattle (Note: No. 68: Seattle → Chicago (D). See Round 2: Chicago → Seattle.)
3	69	Dallas Cowboys	Jason Williams	LB	Western Illinois	from Cleveland (Note: No. 69: Cleveland → Dallas (PD). Cleveland traded a third-round selection (69th overall) to Dallas in exchange for a 2008 fourth-round selection.)
3	70	Cincinnati Bengals	Michael Johnson	DE	Georgia Tech	
3	71	Oakland Raiders	Matt Shaughnessy	DE	Wisconsin	
3	72	Jacksonville Jaguars	Terrance Knighton	DT	Temple	
3	73	Jacksonville Jaguars	Derek Cox	CB	William & Mary	from Green Bay via New England (Note: No. 73: Green Bay → New England → Jacksonville. Multiple trades: Green Bay → New England (D). See Round 1: New England → Green Bay. New England → Jacksonville (D). New England traded a third-round selection (73rd overall) to Jacksonville in exchange for a seventh-round selection (232nd overall) and a 2010 second-round selection.)
3	74	San Francisco 49ers	Glen Coffee	RB	Alabama	
3	75	Dallas Cowboys	Robert Brewster	T	Ball State	from Buffalo (Note: No. 75: Buffalo → Dallas (D). See Round 2: Dallas → Buffalo.)
3	76	Detroit Lions	DeAndre Levy	LB	Wisconsin	from New Orleans via NY Jets (Note: No. 76: New Orleans → NY Jets → Detroit. Multiple trades: New Orleans → NY Jets (PD). New Orleans traded a third-round selection (76th overall) and a 2008 fourth-round selection to the NY Jets in exchange for a fourth-round selection (118th overall) and LB Jonathan Vilma. The third-round selection was upgraded from a fourth-rounder after Vilma met playtime incentives. NY Jets → Detroit (D). See Round 3: Detroit → NY Jets)
3	77	Houston Texans	Antoine Caldwell	C	Alabama	
3	78	San Diego Chargers	Louis Vasquez ^{†}	G	Texas Tech	
3	79	Pittsburgh Steelers	Kraig Urbik	G	Wisconsin	from Denver (Note: No. 79: Denver → Pittsburgh (D). See Round 2: Pittsburgh → Denver.)
3	80	Washington Redskins	Kevin Barnes	CB	Maryland	
3	81	Tampa Bay Buccaneers	Roy Miller	DT	Texas	
3	82	Detroit Lions	Derrick Williams	WR	Penn State	from Dallas (Note: No. 82: Dallas → Detroit (PD). See Round 1: Dallas → Detroit.)
3	83	New England Patriots	Brandon Tate	WR	North Carolina	from NY Jets via Green Bay (Note: No. 83: NY Jets → Green Bay → New England. Multiple trades: NY Jets → Green Bay (PD). The NY Jets traded a third-round selection (83rd overall) to Green Bay in exchange for QB Brett Favre. The conditional selection, originally a fourth-rounder, became a third-round selection (83rd overall) because Favre took more than 50 percent of the team's snaps; had the Jets made the playoffs, it would have become a second-round selection. Green Bay → New England (D) See Round 1: New England → Green Bay.)
3	84	Pittsburgh Steelers	Mike Wallace ^{†}	WR	Ole Miss	from Chicago via Denver (Note: No. 84: Chicago → Denver → Pittsburgh. Multiple trades: Chicago → Denver (PD). See Round 1: Chicago → Denver. Denver → Pittsburgh (D). See Round 2: Pittsburgh → Denver.)
3	85	New York Giants	Ramses Barden	WR	Cal Poly	from Philadelphia (Note: No. 85: Philadelphia → NY Giants (PD). Philadelphia traded a third-round selection (85th overall) to the NY Giants in exchange for third- and fifth-round selections (91st and 164th overall).)
3	86	Minnesota Vikings	Asher Allen	CB	Georgia	
3	87	Miami Dolphins	Patrick Turner	WR	USC	
3	88	Baltimore Ravens	Lardarius Webb	CB	Nicholls State	
3	89	Tennessee Titans	Jared Cook ^{†}	TE	South Carolina	from New England (Note: No. 89: New England → Tennessee (D). New England traded a third-round selection (89th overall) to Tennessee in exchange for a 2010 second-round selection.)
3	90	Atlanta Falcons	Christopher Owens	CB	San Jose State	
3	91	Seattle Seahawks	Deon Butler	WR	Penn State	from NY Giants via Philadelphia (Note: No. 91: NY Giants → Philadelphia → Seattle. Multiple trades: NY Giants → Philadelphia (PD). See Round 3: Philadelphia → NY Giants. Philadelphia → Seattle (D). Philadelphia traded a third-round selection (91st overall) to Seattle in exchange for fifth- and seventh-round selections (137th and 213th overall), and a 2010 third round selection.)
3	92	Indianapolis Colts	Jerraud Powers	CB	Auburn	
3	93	Carolina Panthers	Corvey Irvin	DT	Georgia	
3	94	Tennessee Titans	Ryan Mouton	CB	Hawaii	
3	95	Arizona Cardinals	Rashad Johnson	S	Alabama	
3	96	Pittsburgh Steelers	Keenan Lewis	CB	Oregon State	
3*	97	New England Patriots	Tyrone McKenzie	LB	South Florida	
3*	98	Cincinnati Bengals	Chase Coffman	TE	Missouri	
3*	99	Chicago Bears	Juaquin Iglesias	WR	Oklahoma	
3*	100	New York Giants	Travis Beckum	TE	Wisconsin	
4	101	Dallas Cowboys	Stephen McGee	QB	Texas A&M	from Detroit (Note: No. 101: Detroit → Dallas (PD). Detroit traded a fourth-round selection (101st overall) and a 2008 third-round selection to Dallas in exchange for a 2008 third-round selection.)
4	102	Kansas City Chiefs	Donald Washington	CB	Ohio State	
4	103	St. Louis Rams	Darell Scott	DT	Clemson	
4	104	Cleveland Browns	Kaluka Maiava	LB	USC	
4	105	Chicago Bears	Henry Melton ^{†}	DE	Texas	from Seattle (Note: No. 105: Seattle → Chicago (D). See Round 2: Chicago → Seattle.)
4	106	Cincinnati Bengals	Jonathan Luigs	C	Arkansas	
4	107	Jacksonville Jaguars	Mike Thomas	WR	Arizona	
4	108	Miami Dolphins	Brian Hartline	WR	Ohio State	from Oakland (Note: No. 108: Oakland → Miami (D). Oakland traded fourth- and sixth-round selections (108th and 181st overall) to Miami in exchange for a fourth-round selection (126th overall) and C Samson Satele.)
4	109	Green Bay Packers	T. J. Lang ^{†}	T	Eastern Michigan	
4	110	Dallas Cowboys	Victor Butler	DE	Oregon State	from Buffalo (Note: No. 110: Buffalo → Dallas (D). See Round 2: Dallas → Buffalo.)
4	111	Carolina Panthers	Mike Goodson	RB	Texas A&M	from San Francisco (Note: No. 111: San Francisco → Carolina (D). See Round 2: San Francisco → Carolina.)
4	112	Houston Texans	Glover Quin ^{†}	S	New Mexico	
4	113	San Diego Chargers	Vaughn Martin	DT	Western	
4	114	Denver Broncos	David Bruton	S	Notre Dame	
4	115	Detroit Lions	Sammie Hill	DT	Stillman	from Washington via NY Jets (Note: No. 115: Washington → NY Jets → Detroit. Multiple trades: Washington → NY Jets (PD). Washington traded a fourth-round selection (115th overall) to the NY Jets in exchange for G Pete Kendall. The pick was upgraded from the fifth round after Kendall played 80 percent of the snaps for Washington in 2007. NY Jets → Detroit (D). See Round 3: Detroit → NY Jets.)
4	116	New Orleans Saints	Chip Vaughn	S	Wake Forest	
4	117	Tampa Bay Buccaneers	Kyle Moore	DE	USC	from Dallas (Note: No. 117: Dallas → Tampa Bay (D). Dallas traded a fourth-round selection (117th overall) to Tampa Bay in exchange for fourth- and seventh-round selections (120th and 229th overall).)
4	118	New Orleans Saints	Stanley Arnoux	LB	Wake Forest	from NY Jets (Note: No. 118: NY Jets → New Orleans (PD). See Round 3: New Orleans → NY Jets.)
4	119	Chicago Bears	D. J. Moore	CB	Vanderbilt	
4	120	Dallas Cowboys	Brandon Williams	DE	Texas Tech	from Tampa Bay (Note: No. 120: Tampa Bay → Dallas (D). See Round 4: Dallas → Tampa Bay.)
4	121	Buffalo Bills	Shawn Nelson	TE	Southern Miss	from Philadelphia (Note: No. 121: Philadelphia → Buffalo (PD). See Round 1: Philadelphia → Buffalo.)
4	122	Houston Texans	Anthony Hill	TE	NC State	from Minnesota (Note: No. 122: Minnesota → Houston (PD). Minnesota traded a fourth-round selection (122nd overall) to Houston in exchange for QB Sage Rosenfels.)
4	123	New England Patriots	Rich Ohrnberger	G	Penn State	from Baltimore (Note: No. 123: Baltimore → New England (PD). Baltimore traded fourth- and sixth-round selections (123rd and 198th overall) to New England in exchange for two fifth-round selections (137th and 141st overall).)
4	124	Oakland Raiders	Louis Murphy	WR	Florida	from New England (Note: No. 124: New England → Oakland (D). See Round 2: Oakland → New England.)
4	125	Atlanta Falcons	Lawrence Sidbury	DE	Richmond	
4	126	Oakland Raiders	Slade Norris	DE	Oregon State	from Miami (Note: No. 126: Miami → Oakland (D). See Round 4: Oakland → Miami.)
4	127	Indianapolis Colts	Austin Collie	WR	BYU	
4	128	Carolina Panthers	Tony Fiammetta	FB	Syracuse	
4	129	New York Giants	Andre Brown	RB	NC State	
4	130	Tennessee Titans	Gerald McRath	LB	Southern Miss	
4	131	Arizona Cardinals	Greg Toler	CB	St. Paul's (VA)	
4	132	Denver Broncos	Seth Olsen	T	Iowa	from Pittsburgh (Note: No. 132: Pittsburgh → Denver (D). See Round 2: Pittsburgh → Denver.)
4*	133	San Diego Chargers	Tyronne Green	G	Auburn	
4*	134	San Diego Chargers	Gartrell Johnson	RB	Colorado State	
4*	135	Tennessee Titans	Troy Kropog	T	Tulane	
4*	136	Indianapolis Colts	Terrance Taylor	DT	Michigan	
5	137	Baltimore Ravens	Jason Phillips	LB	TCU	from Detroit via Seattle, Philadelphia and New England (Note: No. 137: Detroit → Seattle → Philadelphia → New England → Baltimore. Multiple trades: Detroit → Seattle (D). Detroit traded a fifth-round selection (137th overall) and DT Cory Redding to Seattle in exchange for LB Julian Peterson. Seattle → Philadelphia (D). See Round 3: Philadelphia → Seattle. Philadelphia → New England (D). Philadelphia traded two fifth-round selections (137th and 141st overall) to New England in exchange for CB Ellis Hobbs. New England → Baltimore (D). See Round 4: Baltimore → New England.)
5	138	Atlanta Falcons	William Middleton	CB	Furman	from St. Louis (Note: No. 138: St. Louis → Atlanta (D). St. Louis traded fifth- and sixth-round selections (138th and 176th overall) to Atlanta in exchange for fifth- and sixth-round selections (160th and 196th overall), and WR Laurent Robinson.)
5	139	Kansas City Chiefs	Colin Brown	T	Missouri	
5	140	Chicago Bears	Johnny Knox ^{†}	WR	Abilene Christian	from Seattle via Denver (Note: No. 140: Seattle → Denver → Chicago. Multiple trades: Seattle → Denver (PD). Seattle traded a fifth-round selection (140th overall) to Denver in exchange for WR Keary Colbert. Denver → Chicago (D). See Round 1: Chicago → Denver.)
5	141	Denver Broncos	Kenny McKinley	WR	South Carolina	from Cleveland via Philadelphia, New England and Baltimore (Note: No. 141: Cleveland → Philadelphia → New England → Baltimore. Multiple trades: Cleveland → Philadelphia (PD). Cleveland traded a fifth-round selection (141st overall) to Philadelphia in exchange for a 2008 sixth-round selection. Philadelphia → New England (D). See Round 5: Philadelphia → New England. New England → Baltimore (D). See Round 4: Baltimore → New England. Baltimore → Denver (D). Baltimore traded a fifth-round selection (141st overall) to Denver in exchange for fifth- and sixth-round selections (149th and 185th overall).)
5	142	Cincinnati Bengals	Kevin Huber ^{†}	P	Cincinnati	
5	143	Dallas Cowboys	DeAngelo Smith	CB	Cincinnati	from Oakland via Atlanta (Note: No. 143: Oakland → Atlanta → Dallas. Multiple trades: Oakland → Atlanta (PD). Oakland traded a fifth-round selection (143rd overall) and a 2008 second-round selection to Atlanta in exchange for CB DeAngelo Hall. Atlanta → Dallas (D). Atlanta traded a fifth-round selection (143rd overall) to Dallas in exchange for fifth- and seventh-round selections (156th and 210th overall).)
5	144	Jacksonville Jaguars	Jarett Dillard	WR	Rice	
5	145	Green Bay Packers	Quinn Johnson	FB	LSU	
5	146	San Francisco 49ers	Scott McKillop	LB	Pittsburgh	
5	147	Buffalo Bills	Nic Harris	S	Oklahoma	
5	148	San Diego Chargers	Brandon Hughes	CB	Oregon State	
5	149	Baltimore Ravens	Davon Drew	TE	East Carolina	from Denver (Note: No. 149: Denver → Baltimore (D). See Round 5: Baltimore → Denver.)
5	150	Minnesota Vikings	Jasper Brinkley	LB	South Carolina	from Washington (Note: No. 150: Washington → Minnesota (D). Washington traded a fifth-round selection (150th overall) to Minnesota in exchange for fifth- and seventh-round selections (158th and 221st overall).)
5	151	New York Giants	Rhett Bomar	QB	Sam Houston State	from New Orleans (Note: No. 151: New Orleans → NY Giants (PD). See Round 2: New Orleans → NY Giants.)
5	152	Houston Texans	James Casey	TE	Rice	
5	153	Philadelphia Eagles	Cornelius Ingram	TE	Florida	from NY Jets (Note: No. 153: NY Jets → Philadelphia (PD). The NY Jets traded a fifth-round selection (153rd overall) and a 2010 conditional selection to Philadelphia in exchange for CB Lito Sheppard.)
5	154	Chicago Bears	Marcus Freeman	LB	Ohio State	
5	155	Tampa Bay Buccaneers	Xavier Fulton	T	Illinois	
5	156	Atlanta Falcons	Garrett Reynolds	T	North Carolina	from Dallas (Note: No. 156: Dallas → Atlanta (D). See Round 5: Atlanta → Dallas.)
5	157	Philadelphia Eagles	Macho Harris	CB	Virginia Tech	
5	158	Washington Redskins	Cody Glenn	LB	Nebraska	from Minnesota (Note: No. 158: Minnesota → Washington (D). See Round 5: Washington → Minnesota.)
5	159	Philadelphia Eagles	Fenuki Tupou	T	Oregon	from New England (Note: No. 159: New England → Philadelphia (PD). New England traded a fifth-round selection (159th overall) to Philadelphia in exchange for a 2010 seventh-round selection and WR Greg Lewis.)
5	160	St. Louis Rams	Brooks Foster	WR	North Carolina	from Atlanta (Note: No. 160: Atlanta → St. Louis (D). See Round 5: St. Louis → Atlanta.)
5	161	Miami Dolphins	John Nalbone	TE	Monmouth (NJ)	
5	162	Green Bay Packers	Jamon Meredith	T	South Carolina	from Baltimore via New England (Note: No. 162: Baltimore → New England → Green Bay. Multiple trades: Baltimore → New England (D). See Round 1: Baltimore → New England. New England → Green Bay (D). See Round 1: Green Bay → New England.)
5	163	Carolina Panthers	Duke Robinson	G	Oklahoma	
5	164	New Orleans Saints	Thomas Morstead ^{†}	P	SMU	from NY Giants via Philadelphia (Note: No. 164: NY Giants → Philadelphia → New Orleans. Multiple trades: NY Giants → Philadelphia (D). See Round 3: Philadelphia → NY Giants. Philadelphia → New Orleans (D). Philadelphia traded a fifth-round selection (164th overall) to New Orleans in exchange for a seventh-round selection (222nd overall) and a 2010 fifth-round selection.)
5	165	Miami Dolphins	Chris Clemons	S	Clemson	from Indianapolis (Note: No. 165: Indianapolis → Miami (D). See Round 2: Miami → Indianapolis.)
5	166	Dallas Cowboys	Michael Hamlin	S	Clemson	from Tennessee (Note: No. 166: Tennessee → Dallas (PD). Dallas originally traded a 2008 fourth-round selection to Tennessee in exchange for CB Adam Jones. Tennessee gave up an additional fifth-round selection (166th overall) after Jones was suspended by the league on October 15, 2008; had Jones made it through the 2008 season without suspension, Tennessee would have received a sixth-round selection from Dallas. (Note: McCormick, Terry (October 14, 2008). "Latest 'Pacman' suspension costs Titans fifth-round pick". The City Paper. SouthComm Publishing.))
5	167	Arizona Cardinals	Herman Johnson	G	LSU	
5	168	Pittsburgh Steelers	Joe Burnett	CB	UCF	
5*	169	Pittsburgh Steelers	Frank Summers	FB	UNLV	
5*	170	New England Patriots	George Bussey	G	Louisville	
5*	171	San Francisco 49ers	Nate Davis	QB	Ball State	
5*	172	Dallas Cowboys	David Buehler	K	USC	
5*	173	Tennessee Titans	Javon Ringer	RB	Michigan State	
6	174	Denver Broncos	Tom Brandstater	QB	Fresno State	from Detroit (Note: No. 174: Detroit → Denver (D). Detroit traded a sixth-round selection (174th overall) to Denver in exchange for a seventh-round selection (235th overall) and a 2010 fifth-round selection.)
6	175	Kansas City Chiefs	Quinten Lawrence	WR	McNeese State	
6	176	Atlanta Falcons	Spencer Adkins	LB	Miami (FL)	from St. Louis (Note: No. 176: St. Louis → Atlanta (D). See Round 5: St. Louis → Atlanta.)
6	177	Cleveland Browns	Don Carey	CB	Norfolk State	
6	178	Seattle Seahawks	Mike Teel	QB	Rutgers	
6	179	Cincinnati Bengals	Morgan Trent	CB	Michigan	
6	180	Jacksonville Jaguars	Zach Miller	TE	Nebraska–Omaha	
6	181	Miami Dolphins	Andrew Gardner	T	Georgia Tech	from Oakland (Note: No. 181: Oakland → Miami (PD). See Round 4: Oakland → Miami.)
6	182	Green Bay Packers	Jarius Wynn	DE	Georgia	
6	183	Buffalo Bills	Cary Harris	CB	USC	
6	184	San Francisco 49ers	Bear Pascoe	TE	Fresno State	
6	185	Baltimore Ravens	Cedric Peerman ^{†}	RB	Virginia	from Denver (Note: No. 185: Denver → Baltimore (D). See Round 5: Baltimore → Denver.)
6	186	Washington Redskins	Robert Henson	LB	TCU	
6	187	Green Bay Packers	Brandon Underwood	CB	Cincinnati	from New Orleans (Note: No. 187: New Orleans → Green Bay (PD). New Orleans traded a sixth-round selection (187th overall) to Green Bay in exchange for a 2008 seventh-round selection.)
6	188	Houston Texans	Brice McCain	CB	Utah	
6	189	San Diego Chargers	Kevin Ellison	S	USC	
6	190	Chicago Bears	Al Afalava	S	Oregon State	
6	191	Cleveland Browns	Coye Francies	CB	San Jose State	from Tampa Bay via Chicago and Tampa Bay (Note: No. 191: Tampa Bay → Chicago → Tampa Bay → Cleveland. Multiple trades: Tampa Bay → Chicago (PD). Tampa Bay traded a sixth-round selection (191st overall) to Chicago in exchange for QB Brian Griese. Chicago → Tampa Bay (PD). Chicago traded sixth- and seventh-round selections (191st and 229th overall) to Tampa Bay in exchange for G Dan Buenning. Tampa Bay → Cleveland (D). See Round 1: Cleveland → Tampa Bay.)
6	192	Detroit Lions	Aaron Brown	RB	TCU	from Dallas (Note: No. 192: Dallas → Detroit (PD). See Round 1: Dallas → Detroit.)
6	193	New York Jets	Matt Slauson	G	Nebraska	
6	194	Philadelphia Eagles	Brandon Gibson	WR	Washington State	
6	195	Cleveland Browns	James Davis	RB	Clemson	from Minnesota via Philadelphia (Note: No. 195: Minnesota → Philadelphia → Cleveland. Multiple trades: Minnesota → Philadelphia (PD). Minnesota traded a sixth-round selection (195th overall) to Philadelphia in exchange for QB Kelly Holcomb. Philadelphia → Cleveland (D). See Round 1: Cleveland → Philadelphia.)
6	196	St. Louis Rams	Keith Null	QB	West Texas A&M	from Atlanta (Note: No. 196: Atlanta → St. Louis (D). See Round 5: St. Louis → Atlanta.)
6	197	Dallas Cowboys	Stephen Hodge	S	TCU	from Miami (Note: No. 197: Miami → Dallas (PD). Miami traded a sixth-round selection (197th overall) and a 2008 sixth-round selection to Dallas for a 2008 sixth-round selection and DT Jason Ferguson. (Note: "Cowboys deal Ferguson to Miami". The Seattle Post-Intelligencer. Hearst Corporation. February 29, 2008.))
6	198	New England Patriots	Jake Ingram	LS	Hawaii	from Baltimore (Note: No. 198: Baltimore → New England (D). See Round 4: Baltimore → New England.)
6	199	Oakland Raiders	Stryker Sulak	DE	Missouri	from New England (Note: No. 199: New England → Oakland (D). See Round 2: Oakland → New England.)
6	200	New York Giants	DeAndre Wright	CB	New Mexico	
6	201	Indianapolis Colts	Curtis Painter	QB	Purdue	
6	202	Oakland Raiders	Brandon Myers	TE	Iowa	from Carolina (Note: No. 202: Carolina → Oakland (D). Carolina traded a sixth-round selection (202nd overall) to Oakland in exchange for a seventh-round selection (216th overall) and a 2010 sixth-round selection.)
6	203	Tennessee Titans	Jason McCourty	CB	Rutgers	
6	204	Arizona Cardinals	Will Davis	DE	Illinois	
6	205	Pittsburgh Steelers	Ra'Shon Harris	DT	Oregon	
6*	206	Tennessee Titans	Dominique Edison	WR	Stephen F. Austin	
6*	207	New England Patriots	Myron Pryor	DT	Kentucky	
6*	208	Dallas Cowboys	John Phillips	TE	Virginia	
6*	209	Cincinnati Bengals	Bernard Scott	RB	Abilene Christian	
7	210	Atlanta Falcons	Vance Walker	DT	Georgia Tech	from Detroit via Dallas (Note: No. 210: Detroit → Dallas → Atlanta. Multiple trades: Detroit → Dallas (PD). See Round 1: Dallas → Detroit. Dallas → Atlanta (D). See Round 5: Atlanta → Dallas.)
7	211	St. Louis Rams	Chris Ogbonnaya	RB	Texas	
7	212	Kansas City Chiefs	Javarris Williams	RB	Tennessee State	
7	213	Philadelphia Eagles	Paul Fanaika	G	Arizona State	from Seattle (Note: No. 213: Seattle → Philadelphia (D). See Round 3: Philadelphia → Seattle.)
7	214	Miami Dolphins	J. D. Folsom	LB	Weber State	from Cleveland (Note: No. 214: Cleveland → Miami (PD). Cleveland traded a seventh-round selection (214th overall) to Miami in exchange for CB Travis Daniels.)
7	215	Cincinnati Bengals	Fui Vakapuna	RB	BYU	
7	216	Carolina Panthers	Captain Munnerlyn	CB	South Carolina	from Oakland (Note: No. 216: Oakland → Carolina (D). See Round 6: Carolina → Oakland.)
7	217	Tampa Bay Buccaneers	E. J. Biggers	CB	Western Michigan	from Jacksonville (Note: No. 217: Jacksonville → Tampa Bay (PD). Jacksonville traded a seventh-round selection (217th overall), and 2008 second- and fifth-round selections to Tampa Bay in exchange for a 2008 second-round selection.)
7	218	Green Bay Packers	Brad Jones	LB	Colorado	
7	219	San Francisco 49ers	Curtis Taylor	S	LSU	
7	220	Buffalo Bills	Ellis Lankster	CB	West Virginia	
7	221	Washington Redskins	Eddie Williams	TE	Idaho	from Washington via Minnesota (Note: No. 221: Washington → Minnesota → Washington. Multiple trades: Washington → Minnesota (PD). Washington traded a seventh-round selection (221st overall) to Minnesota in exchange for DE Erasmus James. Minnesota → Washington (D). See Round 5: Washington → Minnesota.)
7	222	Indianapolis Colts	Pat McAfee ^{†}	P	West Virginia	from New Orleans via Philadelphia (Note: No. 222: New Orleans → Philadelphia → Indianapolis. Multiple trades: New Orleans → Philadelphia (D). See Round 5: Philadelphia → New Orleans. Philadelphia → Indianapolis (D). Philadelphia traded a seventh-round selection (222nd overall) to Indianapolis in exchange for a 2010 sixth-round selection.)
7	223	Houston Texans	Troy Nolan	S	Arizona State	
7	224	San Diego Chargers	Demetrius Byrd	WR	LSU	
7	225	Denver Broncos	Blake Schlueter	C	TCU	
7	226	Pittsburgh Steelers	A. Q. Shipley	C	Penn State	from Tampa Bay (Note: No. 226: Tampa Bay → Pittsburgh (PD). Tampa Bay traded a seventh-round selection (226th overall) to Pittsburgh in exchange for C Sean Mahan.)
7	227	Dallas Cowboys	Mike Mickens	CB	Cincinnati	
7	228	Detroit Lions	Lydon Murtha	T	Nebraska	from NY Jets (Note: No. 228: NY Jets → Detroit (D). See Round 3: Detroit → NY Jets.)
7	229	Dallas Cowboys	Manuel Johnson	WR	Oklahoma	from Chicago via Tampa Bay and Detroit (Note: No. 229: Chicago → Tampa Bay → Detroit → Dallas. Multiple trades: Chicago → Tampa Bay (PD). See Round 6: Chicago → Tampa Bay. Tampa Bay → Dallas (D). See Round 4: Dallas → Tampa Bay.)
7	230	Philadelphia Eagles	Moise Fokou	LB	Maryland	
7	231	Minnesota Vikings	Jamarca Sanford	S	Ole Miss	
7	232	New England Patriots	Julian Edelman	WR	Kent State	from Miami via Jacksonville (Note: No. 232: Miami → Jacksonville → New England. Multiple trades: Miami → Jacksonville (PD). Miami traded a seventh-round selection (232nd overall) to Jacksonville in exchange for DT Tony McDaniel. Jacksonville → New England (D). See Round 3: New England → Jacksonville.); Super Bowl LIII MVP
7	233	Tampa Bay Buccaneers	Sammie Stroughter	WR	Oregon State	from Baltimore (Note: No. 233: Baltimore → Tampa Bay (PD). Baltimore traded a seventh-round selection (233rd overall) and a 2010 conditional seventh-round selection to Tampa Bay in exchange for DL Marques Douglas.)
7	234	New England Patriots	Darryl Richard	DT	Georgia Tech	
7	235	Detroit Lions	Zack Follett	LB	California	from Atlanta via Denver (Note: No. 235: Atlanta → Denver → Detroit. Multiple trades: Atlanta → Denver (PD). Atlanta traded a seventh-round selection (235th overall) to Denver in exchange for CB Domonique Foxworth. Denver → Detroit (D). See Round 5: Detroit → Denver.)
7	236	Indianapolis Colts	Jaimie Thomas	T	Maryland	
7	237	Kansas City Chiefs	Jake O'Connell	TE	Miami (OH)	from Carolina via Miami (Note: No. 237: Carolina → Miami → Kansas City. Multiple trades: Carolina → Miami (PD). Carolina traded a seventh-round selection (237th overall) to Miami in exchange for QB Josh McCown. Miami → Kansas City (D). Miami traded a seventh-round selection (237th overall) to Kansas City in exchange for a 2010 seventh-round selection.)
7	238	New York Giants	Stoney Woodson	CB	South Carolina	
7	239	Tennessee Titans	Ryan Durand	G	Syracuse	
7	240	Arizona Cardinals	LaRod Stephens-Howling	RB	Pittsburgh	
7	241	Pittsburgh Steelers	David Johnson	TE	Arkansas State	
7*	242	Tennessee Titans	Nick Schommer	S	North Dakota State	
7*	243	Washington Redskins	Marko Mitchell	WR	Nevada	
7*	244	San Francisco 49ers	Ricky Jean-Francois	DT	LSU	
7*	245	Seattle Seahawks	Courtney Greene	S	Rutgers	
7*	246	Chicago Bears	Lance Louis	G	San Diego State	
7*	247	Seattle Seahawks	Nick Reed	DE	Oregon	
7*	248	Seattle Seahawks	Cameron Morrah	TE	California	
7*	249	Cincinnati Bengals	Clinton McDonald	DE	Memphis	
7*	250	Jacksonville Jaguars	Rashad Jennings	RB	Liberty	
7*	251	Chicago Bears	Derek Kinder	WR	Pittsburgh	
7*	252	Cincinnati Bengals	Freddie Brown	WR	Utah	
7*	253	Jacksonville Jaguars	Tiquan Underwood	WR	Rutgers	
7*	254	Arizona Cardinals	Trevor Canfield	G	Cincinnati	
7^	255	Detroit Lions	Dan Gronkowski	TE	Maryland	
7^	256	Kansas City Chiefs	Ryan Succop	K	South Carolina	

== Trades ==
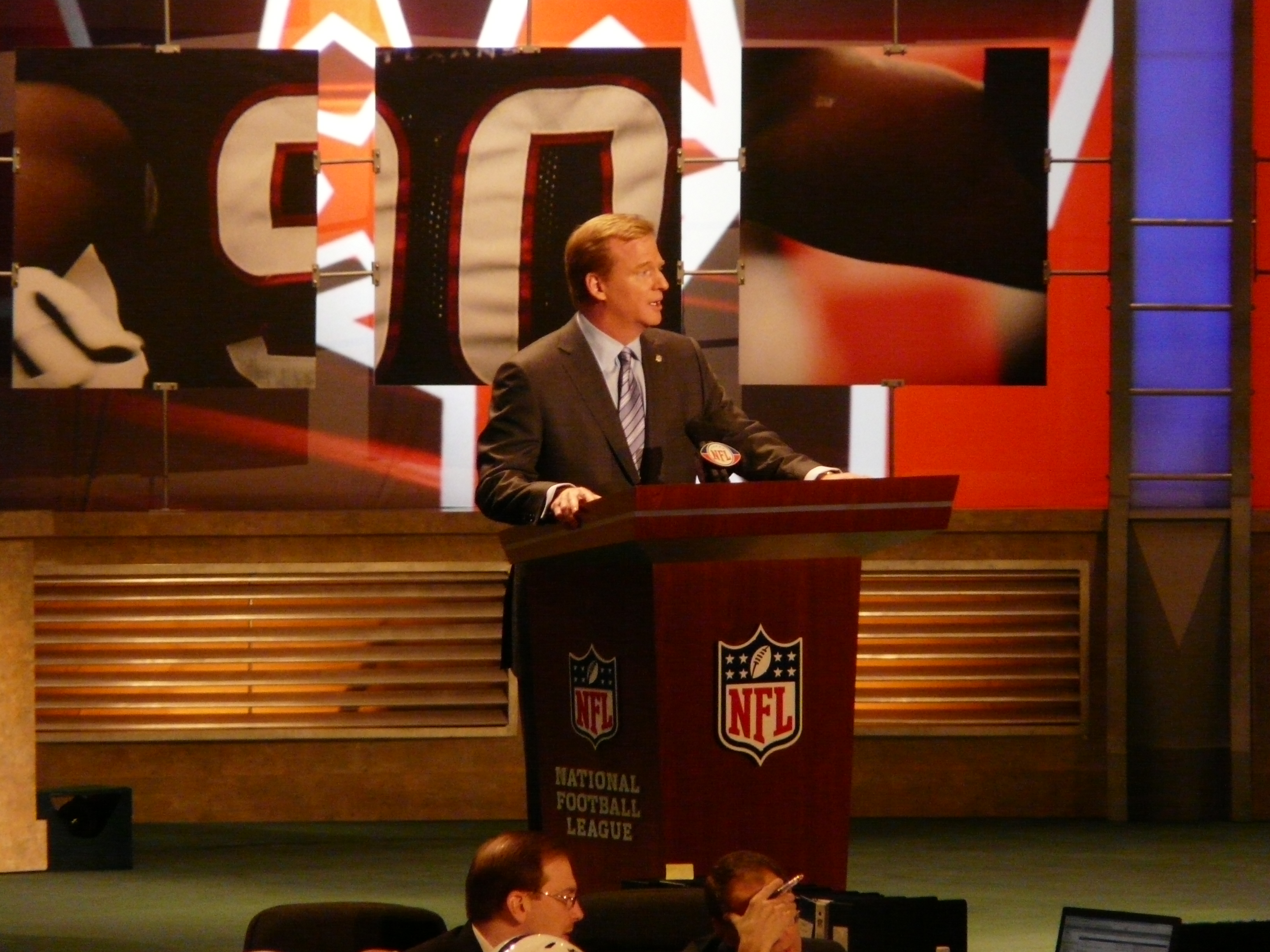
NFL commissioner Roger Goodell announcing a pick at the 2009 draft.

In the explanations below, (D) denotes trades that took place during the draft, while (PD) indicates trades completed pre-draft.

Round 1

Round 2

Round 3

Round 4

Round 5

Round 6

Round 7

== Supplemental draft selections ==
One player was selected in the 2009 Supplemental Draft:

Rnd.	Pick	Team	Player	Pos.	College	Notes
3	—	Washington Redskins	Jeremy Jarmon	DE	Kentucky	Washington forfeited their third-round selection in the 2010 draft.

== Notable undrafted players ==
^{†}	Pro Bowler

Original NFL team	Player	Pos.	College	Notes
Arizona Cardinals	Reggie Walker	LB	Kansas State	
Baltimore Ravens	Dannell Ellerbe	LB	Georgia	
Baltimore Ravens	Graham Gano ^{†}	K	Florida State	
Buffalo Bills	Ryan Manalac	LB	Cincinnati	
Buffalo Bills	Ashlee Palmer	LB	Mississippi	
Buffalo Bills	Garrison Sanborn	LS	Florida State	
Carolina Panthers	Brit Miller	FB	Illinois	
Carolina Panthers	Nick Sundberg	LS	California	
Carolina Panthers	Garry Williams	T	Kentucky	
Cincinnati Bengals	Quan Cosby	WR	Texas	
Cincinnati Bengals	Tom Nelson	S	Illinois State	
Cincinnati Bengals	Chris Pressley	RB	Wisconsin	
Cincinnati Bengals	Dan Skuta	LB	Grand Valley State	
Cleveland Browns	Marcus Benard	LB	Jackson State	
Cleveland Browns	Jordan Norwood	WR	Penn State	
Dallas Cowboys	Kevin Ogletree	WR	Virginia	
Denver Broncos	Chris Baker	DE	Hampton	
Denver Broncos	Britton Colquitt	P	Tennessee	
Green Bay Packers	Graham Harrell	QB	Texas Tech	
Green Bay Packers	Evan Smith	C	Idaho State	
Green Bay Packers	Ronald Talley	DE	Delaware	
Houston Texans	Arian Foster ^{†}	RB	Tennessee	
Houston Texans	Tim Jamison	DE	Michigan	
Indianapolis Colts	Colin Cloherty	TE	Brown	
Indianapolis Colts	Ramon Humber	LB	North Dakota State	
Indianapolis Colts	Jacob Lacey	CB	Oklahoma State	
Indianapolis Colts	Tim Masthay	P	Kentucky	
Jacksonville Jaguars	Russell Allen	LB	San Diego State	
Jacksonville Jaguars	Brock Bolen	FB	Louisville	
Kansas City Chiefs	Jovan Belcher	LB	Maine	
Kansas City Chiefs	Tom Crabtree	TE	Miami (OH)	
Kansas City Chiefs	Tanner Purdum	LS	Baker	
Kansas City Chiefs	Pierre Walters	LB	Eastern Illinois	
Miami Dolphins	Ryan Baker	DE	Purdue	
Minnesota Vikings	Colt Anderson	S	Montana	
Minnesota Vikings	Kahlil Bell	RB	UCLA	
Minnesota Vikings	Jon Cooper	C	Oklahoma	
Minnesota Vikings	Robert Francois	LB	Boston College	
New England Patriots	Brian Hoyer	QB	Michigan State	
New Orleans Saints	Jonathan Casillas	LB	Wisconsin	
New Orleans Saints	Danny Gorrer	CB	Texas A&M	
New Orleans Saints	Jermey Parnell	T	Mississippi	
New York Jets	T. J. Conley	P	Idaho	
New York Jets	Josh Mauga	LB	Nevada	
New York Jets	Zach Potter	TE	Nebraska	
Oakland Raiders	Desmond Bryant	DT	Harvard	
Oakland Raiders	Nick Miller	WR	Southern Utah	
Philadelphia Eagles	Reshard Langford	S	Vanderbilt	
Philadelphia Eagles	Dallas Reynolds	C	BYU	
Pittsburgh Steelers	Ramon Foster	G	Tennessee	
Pittsburgh Steelers	Steve McLendon	DT	Troy	
Pittsburgh Steelers	Isaac Redman	RB	Bowie State	
St. Louis Rams	Phil Trautwein	T	Florida	
San Diego Chargers	Kory Sperry	TE	Colorado State	
San Diego Chargers	C. J. Spillman	S	Marshall	
San Francisco 49ers	Alex Boone	T	Ohio State	
San Francisco 49ers	Diyral Briggs	LB	Bowling Green	
Seattle Seahawks	Michael Bennett ^{†}	DT	Texas A&M	
Tampa Bay Buccaneers	Demar Dotson	T	Southern Mississippi	
Tampa Bay Buccaneers	Kareem Huggins	RB	Hofstra	
Tampa Bay Buccaneers	Josh Vaughan	RB	Richmond	
Washington Redskins	Chase Daniel	QB	Missouri	
Washington Redskins	Antonio Dixon	NT	Miami (FL)	
Washington Redskins	Edwin Williams	T	Maryland	
Washington Redskins	Darrel Young	RB	Villanova	

== Selections by conference ==
Selection totals by college conference
#	Conference	Players selected	Division
1	Southeastern Conference	37	I FBS
2	Atlantic Coast Conference	32	I FBS
2	Pac-10 Conference	32	I FBS
4	Big 12 Conference	28	I FBS
4	Big Ten Conference	28	I FBS
6	Big East Conference	27	I FBS
7	Mountain West Conference	16	I FBS
8	Conference USA	10	I FBS
8	Mid-American Conference	10	I FBS
8	Western Athletic Conference	10	I FBS
11	Southland Conference	4	I FCS
12	Lone Star Conference	4	II
13	Colonial Athletic Association	2	I FCS
13	Sun Belt Conference	2	I FBS
15	Big South Conference	1	I FCS
15	Big Sky Conference	1	I FCS
15	Central Intercollegiate Athletic Association	1	II
15	Great West Conference	1	I FCS
15	Independent	1	I FBS
15	Mid-Eastern Athletic Conference	1	I FCS
15	Missouri Valley Conference	1	I FCS
15	Ohio Valley Conference	1	I FCS
15	Southern Intercollegiate Athletic Conference	1	II
15	Southern Conference	1	I FCS
15	Ontario University Athletics	1	CIS

== Selections by position ==
Selection totals by player position
Round	QB	RB	FB	WR	TE	C	OG	OT	DE	DT	LB	CB	S	K	P	LS
1st	3	3	0	6*	1	2	0	4	4	5	3	2	0	0	0	0
2nd	1	1	0	2	1	1	1	4	5	3	3	4	6*	0	0	0
3rd	0	2	0	7	3	1	2	1	2	5	3	9*	1	0	0	0
4th	1	3	1	4	2	1	2	3	6*	4	3	3	3	0	0	0
5th	2	2	1	4	4	0	3	5*	0	0	5*	5*	3	1	2	0
6th	4	4	0	3	4	0	1	1	3	2	2	8*	3	0	0	1
7th	0	5	0	8*	5	2	4	2	2	3	4	5	5	1	1	0
TOTAL	11	20	2	34	20	7	13	20	23	20	23	36*	21	2	3	1

== See also ==
- List of first overall National Football League draft picks
- Mr. Irrelevant – the list of last overall National Football League draft picks
