= 2008 Atlanta Falcons season =

NFL team season

- Owner: Arthur Blank
- General manager: Thomas Dimitroff
- Head coach: Mike Smith
- Offensive coordinator: Mike Mularkey
- Defensive coordinator: Brian VanGorder
- Home stadium: Georgia Dome

Results
- Record: 11–5
- Division place: 2nd NFC South
- Playoffs: Lost Wild Card Playoffs (at Cardinals) 24–30
- Pro Bowlers: RB Michael Turner; WR Roddy White

The 2008 Atlanta Falcons season was the 43rd season for the team in the National Football League (NFL). Overcoming a disappointing 4–12 record, quarterback Michael Vick's dog fighting scandal and head coach Bobby Petrino's abrupt resignation in 2007, the Falcons, who were expected to be in a rebuilding phase, completed the regular season with a surprising 11–5 record and earned the #5 seed in the NFC playoffs under first-year head coach Mike Smith; however, the team fell to the eventual NFC champion Arizona Cardinals in the wild-card round of the playoffs.

Mike Smith was named 2008 NFL Coach of the Year, and quarterback Matt Ryan earned the Offensive Rookie of the Year Award.

== Offseason ==
=== NFL draft ===
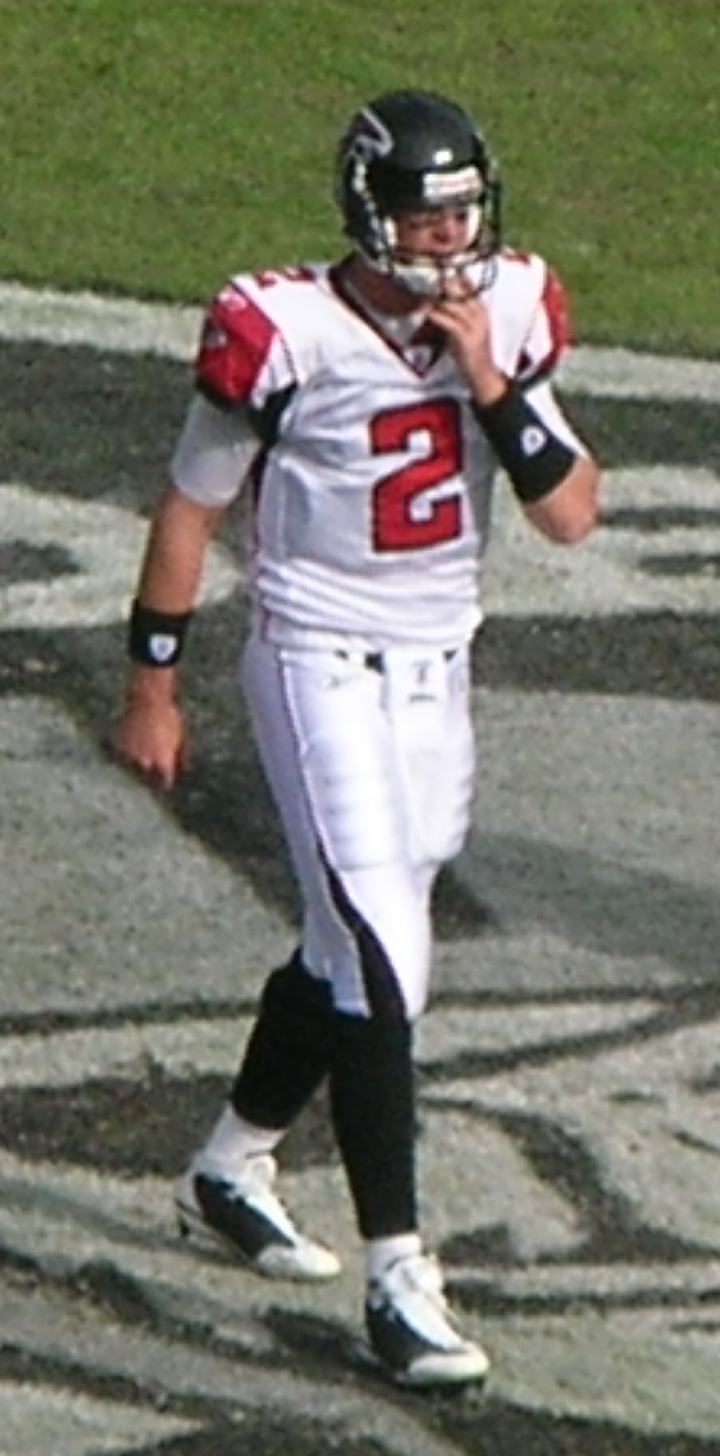
Matt Ryan was the Falcons first round pick in 2008 NFL draft.

On February 22, prior the start of the NFL Combine, the Falcons won a coin toss that gave them the 3rd overall pick in the 2008 NFL draft in a gathering with the Oakland Raiders and the Kansas City Chiefs to break a three-way-tie. Each team finished 2007 with a 4–12 record. Some experts said that the Falcons should have used this selection to pick LSU Defensive Tackle Glenn Dorsey, but the Falcons used their first-round pick to draft Boston College quarterback Matt Ryan. The Falcons also traded two of their second-round picks (No. 34 and No. 48) and a fourth-round pick (No. 103) with Washington Redskins to move to No. 21 overall and select USC tackle Sam Baker.

=== Draft ===
2008 Atlanta Falcons draft
Round	Pick	Player	Position	College	Notes
1	3	Matt Ryan *	QB	Boston College	
1	21	Sam Baker	OT	USC	
2	37	Curtis Lofton	LB	Oklahoma	
3	68	Chevis Jackson	CB	LSU	
3	84	Harry Douglas	WR	Louisville	
3	98	Thomas DeCoud *	S	California	
5	138	Robert James	LB	Arizona State	
5	154	Kroy Biermann	DE.	Montana	
6	172	Thomas Brown	RB	Georgia	
7	212	Wilrey Fontenot	CB	Arizona	
7	232	Keith Zinger	TE	LSU	
Made roster † Pro Football Hall of Fame * Made at least one Pro Bowl during career

=== Transactions ===
January

- 8 – Signed DE Willie Evans to reserve/futures contract
- 13 – Announced a 17-month extension of contract of team president Rich McKay
- 13 – Named former Patriots director of college scouting Thomas Dimitroff as new general manager
- 16 – Defensive coordinator Mike Zimmer signed to same position with Cincinnati Bengals
- 23 – Named Mike Smith head coach
- 24 – Named Emmitt Thomas assistant head coach, Bill Musgrave quarterbacks coach and Brian VanGorder defensive coordinator
- 25 – Named Mike Mularkey offensive coordinator
- 26 – Named Terry Robiskie offensive coordinator, Ray Hamilton defensive line coach, Gerald Brown running backs coach and Glenn Thomas offensive quality control coach
- 29 – Named Keith Armstrong special teams coordinator, Jeff Fish strength and conditioning coach, Bill Hughan assistant strength and conditioning coach and retrained Tom McMahon as assistant special teams coach
- 30 – Named Chris Scelfo tight ends coach and Paul Dunn assistant offensive line coach
- 31 – Named Paul Boudreau offensive line coach

February

- 4 – Named Joe Danna defensive quality control coach
- 5 – Re-signed free agent TE George Cooper
- 6 – Named Alvin Reynolds defensive backs coach
- 9 – Assistant general manager Billy Devaney named Executive Vice President of Player Personnel for the St. Louis Rams
- 11 – Waived WR Todd Watkins
- 15 – Released TE Alge Crumpler, QB Byron Leftwich, T Wayne Gandy, CB Lewis Sanders, WR Jamin Elliott, LB Marcus Wilkins and DT Rod Coleman.
- 29 – Re-signed QB Chris Redman

March

- 1 – Agreed to terms with free agent S Erik Coleman and CB Von Hutchins
- 2 – Agreed to terms with free agent TE Ben Hartsock and RB Michael Turner
- 3 – Released RB Warrick Dunn
- 5 – Released QB Joey Harrington
- 7 – Signed free agents DT Rashad Moore, DT Kindal Moorehead and DE Simon Fraser
- 10 – Signed free agent DT Tim Anderson
- 10 – Signed free agent C Alex Stepanovich
- 12 – Re-signed QB Joey Harrington
- 14 – Signed free agent TE Jason Rader
- 19 – Retained exclusive rights to T Tyson Clabo
- 20 – Traded CB DeAngelo Hall to Oakland for a second-round pick in 2008 and a fifth-round pick in 2009
- 21 – Signed free agent K Jason Elam
- 24 – Retained exclusive rights to DT Montavious Stanley

April

- 24 – Signed free agent K Kevin Lovell
- 26 – Drafted QB Matt Ryan (R1-3 overall), OT Sam Baker (R1-21 overall) and LB Curtis Lofton (R2-37 overall) in the 2008 NFL Draft
- 26 – Traded two-second-round choices (#34 and #48 overall) and a fourth-round choice (#103) to the Washington Redskins for a first-round choice (#21 overall/T Sam Baker), a third-round choice (#84 overall) and a fifth-round choice (#154 overall)
- 27 – Drafted CB Chevis Jackson (R3-68 overall), WR Harry Douglas (R3-84 overall), S Thomas DeCoud (R3-98 overall) LB Robert James (R5-138), LB Kroy Biermann (R5-154 overall), RB Thomas Brown (R6-172 overall), CB Wilrey Fontenot (R7-212 overall) and TE Keith Zinger (R7-232 overall) in the 2008 NFL draft
- 28 – Signed undrafted free agents LB Isaac Brown (Central Michigan University), P Jimmie Kaylor (Colorado State University), CB Glenn Sharpe (Miami), FS D.J. Wolfe (University of Oklahoma), DE Brandon Miller (University of Georgia), RB Jamar Brittingham (Bloomsburg University) and T Michael Butterworth (Slippery Rock University)
- 29 – Signed free agents WR Chandler Williams and DB Nick Turnbull

May

- 19 – Released LB Earl Everett and DB Nick Turnbull and signed WR Tony Gonzalez (wide receiver), S Eric Brock and S Jamal Lewis
- 20 – Agreed to contract terms with QB Matt Ryan (first-round draft choice)
- 21 – Signed free agent TE Brad Listorti
- 22 – Waived P Jimmie Kaylor
- 23 – Waived SS D.J. Wolfe

June

- 7 – Signed Draft pick, TE Keith Zinger to a four-year contract
- 10 – Waived TE George Cooper
- 10 – Signed Draft picks CB Chevis Jackson and S Thomas DeCoud
- 17 – Released DB Jimmy Williams and signed Draft pick Wilrey Fontenot
- 18 – Signed Draft pick RB Thomas Brown
- 20 – Agreed to contract terms with veteran free agent S Deke Cooper
- 20 – Agreed to contract terms with Draft pick WR Harry Douglas
- 20 – Released OT Michael Butterworth, DE Derrick Jones, S Jamal Lewis and OL Kurt Quarterman
- 23 – Released C Doug Datish
- 26 – Signed Draft pick DE Kroy Biermann

July

- 18 – Released WR Tony Gonzalez (wide receiver)
- 15 – Signed Draft pick LB Robert James
- 23 – Named Georgia Force Head Coach Doug Plank Falcons coaching assistant
- 25 – Signed Draft pick LB Curtis Lofton
- 25 – Signed CB Blue Adams, LB Coy Wire and OL Michael Butterworth, waived CB Glenn Sharpe and OL Pat McCoy, reached an injury settlement with LB Travis Williams, placed DT Trey Lewis on the active/non-football injury list and placed T Renardo Foster and the physically unable to perform list
- 26 – Signed Draft pick T Sam Baker

August

- 4 – Released RB Jamar Brittingham and signed TE George Cooper
- 6 – Signed LB Mickey Pimentel and placed LB Robert James on injured reserve
- 7 – Signed C Doug Datish and waived K Kevin Lovell
- 11 – Waived/injured TE Brad Listorti
- 19 – Released WR Joe Horn and waived/injured LB Isaac Brown
- 24 – Released TE George Cooper and signed TE Marcus Pollard
- 26 – Placed DT Trey Lewis on the reserve-non-football injury list and T Renardo Foster on the reserve-physically unable to perform list
- 30 – Waived OL D'Anthony Batiste, S Eric Brock, OL Michael Butterworth, S Deke Cooper, C Doug Datish, DE Willie Evans, QB Joey Harrington, CB Wilrey Fontenot, OL Kynan Forney, DE Brandon Miller, DT Rashad Moore, OL Terrance Pennington, LB Mickey Pimentel, TE Marcus Pollard, CB Glenn Sharpe, DT Montavious Stanley, S Daren Stone, LB Cameron Vaughn, WR Eric Weems, WR Chandler Williams, TE Keith Zinger and placed RB Thomas Brown on injured reserve
- 31 – Claimed DT Jason Jefferson off waivers, released DT Tim Anderson and signed TE Keith Zinger, WR Eric Weems, OL D'Anthony Batiste, DB Glenn Sharpe, DB Eric Brock and DE Brandon Miller to the practice squad.

=== Final cuts ===
On August 30, the Falcons made 22 roster moves to reach the NFL's 53-player limit.

- Offensive lineman D'Anthony Batiste
- Safety Eric Brock
- Offensive lineman Michael Butterworth
- Safety Deke Cooper
- Center Doug Datish
- Defensive end Willie Evans
- Quarterback Joey Harrington
- Cornerback Wilrey Fontenot
- Offensive lineman Kynan Forney
- Defensive end Brandon Miller
- Defensive tackle Rashad Moore
- Offensive lineman Terrance Pennington
- Linebacker Mickey Pimentel
- Tight end Marcus Pollard
- Cornerback Glenn Sharpe
- Defensive tackle Montavious Stanley
- Safety Daren Stone
- Linebacker Cameron Vaughn
- Wide receiver Eric Weems
- Wide receiver Chandler Williams
- Tight end Keith Zinger

=== Minicamp ===
The Falcons opened the first mini camp of 2008 on Monday, April 14. The team had multiple "mini camp" sessions under new Head Coach Mike Smith before the start of training camp in late July. The team worked for three days before the NFL Draft and came back to Flowery Branch for another workout May 10–12. During the minicamp, the Falcons signed tender offers to punter Michael Koenen and defensive end Chauncey Davis.

=== Training camp ===
For the fourth consecutive year, the Falcons held Russell Falcons Training Camp at the team's Flowery Branch headquarters. Atlanta's 43rd training camp was held from July 25 to August 15, with select morning and afternoon practices open to the public. The Falcons held 30 practices, which included 13 two-a-day sessions. Atlanta traveled to Jacksonville on August 9 for its first preseason contest followed by two home preseason games against Indianapolis the day after training camp breaks (August 16) and Tennessee Titans on August 22. The Falcons concluded the 2008 preseason schedule with a meeting against the Baltimore Ravens on August 28 at M&T Bank Stadium. In 2007, Russell Athletic and the Atlanta Falcons announced an agreement that includes title sponsorship of the team's three-week preseason training camp at its in-season training facility in Flowery Branch, Ga. The four-year agreement designates Russell Athletic as an official sponsor of the Falcons.

== Staff ==
2008 Atlanta Falcons staff
Front office: Owner/chief executive officer – Arthur Blank; President – Rich McKay; general manager – Thomas Dimitroff; Director of football administration – Nick Polk; Director of pro personnel – Les Snead; Assistant director of player personnel – Lionel Vital; Director of college scouting – David Caldwell; Head coaches: Head coach – Mike Smith; Assistant head coach/secondary – Emmitt Thomas; Assistant to the head coach – Andrew Weidinger; Offensive coaches: Offensive coordinator – Mike Mularkey; Quarterbacks – Bill Musgrave; Running backs – Gerald Brown; Wide receivers – Terry Robiskie; Tight ends – Chris Scelfo; Offensive line – Paul T. Boudreau; Assistant offensive line – Paul Dunn; Offensive assistant – Glenn Thomas	Defensive coaches: Defensive coordinator – Brian VanGorder; Defensive line – Ray Hamilton; Linebackers – Glenn Pires; Defensive backs – Alvin Reynolds; Defensive assistant – Joe Danna; Special teams coaches: Special teams coordinator – Keith Armstrong; Assistant special teams – Tom McMahon; Strength and conditioning: Director of athletic performance – Jeff Fish; Assistant strength and conditioning – Bill Hughan

== Roster ==
2008 Atlanta Falcons final roster
Quarterbacks (QB): 8 Chris Redman; 2 Matt Ryan; 3 D. J. Shockley; Running backs (RB): 34 Ovie Mughelli FB; 32 Jerious Norwood; 44 Jason Snelling; 33 Michael Turner; Wide receivers (WR): 83 Harry Douglas; 86 Brian Finneran; 12 Michael Jenkins; 14 Eric Weems; 84 Roddy White; Tight ends (TE): 87 Justin Peelle; 81 Marcus Pollard; 85 Jason Rader	Offensive linemen (OL): 72 Sam Baker T; 63 Justin Blalock G; 77 Tyson Clabo T; 73 Harvey Dahl G; 68 Wayne Gandy T; 62 Todd McClure C; 76 Quinn Ojinnaka G/T; 69 Alex Stepanovich C/G; 74 Todd Weiner T; 67 Ben Wilkerson C; Defensive linemen (DL): 55 John Abraham DE; 98 Jamaal Anderson DE; 95 Jonathan Babineaux DT; 71 Kroy Biermann DE; 92 Chauncey Davis DE; 75 Simon Fraser DE; 90 Grady Jackson DT; 99 Jason Jefferson DT; 94 Kindal Moorehead DT	Linebackers (LB): 59 Michael Boley OLB; 56 Keith Brooking OLB; 51 Tony Gilbert MLB; 50 Curtis Lofton MLB; 54 Stephen Nicholas OLB; 52 Coy Wire OLB; Defensive backs (DB): 42 Eric Brock SS; 26 Erik Coleman FS; 28 Thomas DeCoud FS; 24 Domonique Foxworth CB; 29 Jamaal Fudge SS; 20 Brent Grimes CB; 23 Chris Houston CB; 22 Chevis Jackson CB; 36 Lawyer Milloy SS; 37 Glenn Sharpe CB; Special teams (ST): 1 Jason Elam K; 9 Michael Koenen P; 46 Mike Schneck LS	Practice squad: 38 Chris Barclay RB; 66 Nate Bennett G/C; 70 Michael Butterworth T; 96 Willie Evans DE; 11 Noriaki Kinoshita WR ^{Int'l}; 91 Tywain Myles DT; 35 Darius Vinnett CB; 18 Chandler Williams WR; 82 Keith Zinger TE; Reserve: 27 Thomas Brown RB (IR); 79 Renardo Foster T (PUP); 41 Antoine Harris S (IR); 89 Ben Hartsock TE (IR); 25 Von Hutchins CB (IR); 30 David Irons CB (IR); 45 Robert James LB (IR); 97 Trey Lewis DT (NF-Inj.); 64 Pat McCoy T (IR); 19 Laurent Robinson WR (IR); 7 Michael Vick QB (Susp.); Rookies in italics 53 active, 11 reserve, 9 practice squad

== Preseason ==
=== Schedule ===
Week	Date	Opponent	Result	Record	Game site	TV	NFL.com recap
1	August 9	at Jacksonville Jaguars	L 17–20	0–1	Jacksonville Municipal Stadium	Randy Waters, Brian Baldinger, Sam Crenshaw/Paul Burmeister, Tony Boselli	Recap
2	August 16	Indianapolis Colts	L 9–16	0–2	Georgia Dome	Don Fischer, Mark Herrmann, Jeffrey Gorman/Randy Waters, Brian Baldinger, Sam Crenshaw	Recap
3	August 22	Tennessee Titans	W 17–3	1–2	Georgia Dome	Cory Curtis, Eddie George, Joe Dubin/Randy Waters, Brian Baldinger, Sam Crenshaw	Recap
4	August 28	at Baltimore Ravens	W 10–9	2–2	M&T Bank Stadium	Randy Waters, Brian Baldinger, Sam Crenshaw/Gerry Sandusky, Stan White, Rob Burnett	Recap

== Regular season ==
=== Schedule ===
Week	Date	Opponent	Result	Record	Game site	NFL.com recap
1	September 7	Detroit Lions	W 34–21	1–0	Georgia Dome	Recap
2	September 14	at Tampa Bay Buccaneers	L 9–24	1–1	Raymond James Stadium	Recap
3	September 21	Kansas City Chiefs	W 38–14	2–1	Georgia Dome	Recap
4	September 28	at Carolina Panthers	L 9–24	2–2	Bank of America Stadium	Recap
5	October 5	at Green Bay Packers	W 27–24	3–2	Lambeau Field	Recap
6	October 12	Chicago Bears	W 22–20	4–2	Georgia Dome	Recap
7	Bye					
8	October 26	at Philadelphia Eagles	L 14–27	4–3	Lincoln Financial Field	Recap
9	November 2	at Oakland Raiders	W 24–0	5–3	Oakland–Alameda County Coliseum	Recap
10	November 9	New Orleans Saints	W 34–20	6–3	Georgia Dome	Recap
11	November 16	Denver Broncos	L 20–24	6–4	Georgia Dome	Recap
12	November 23	Carolina Panthers	W 45–28	7–4	Georgia Dome	Recap
13	November 30	at San Diego Chargers	W 22–16	8–4	Qualcomm Stadium	Recap
14	December 7	at New Orleans Saints	L 25–29	8–5	Louisiana Superdome	Recap
15	December 14	Tampa Bay Buccaneers	W 13–10 (OT)	9–5	Georgia Dome	Recap
16	December 21	at Minnesota Vikings	W 24–17	10–5	Hubert H. Humphrey Metrodome	Recap
17	December 28	St. Louis Rams	W 31–27	11–5	Georgia Dome	Recap

=== Standings ===
NFC South
	W	L	T	PCT	DIV	CONF	PF	PA	STK
^{(2)} Carolina Panthers	12	4	0	.750	4–2	8–4	414	329	W1
^{(5)} Atlanta Falcons	11	5	0	.688	3–3	8–4	391	325	W3
Tampa Bay Buccaneers	9	7	0	.563	3–3	8–4	361	323	L4
New Orleans Saints	8	8	0	.500	2–4	5–7	463	393	L1

=== Game summaries ===
==== Week 1: vs. Detroit Lions ====
Quarter	1	2	3	4	Total
Lions	0	14	7	0	21
Falcons	21	0	10	3	34

at Georgia Dome, Atlanta

- Game time: 1:00 pm EDT
- Game weather: None (Domed Stadium)
- Game attendance: 62,310
- Referee: Ron Winter
- TV announcers (Fox): Matt Vasgersian, J.C. Pearson, & Nischelle Turner

The Falcons began their 2008 campaign at home against the Detroit Lions. In the first quarter, Atlanta immediately took flight at rookie quarterback Matt Ryan throws his first career NFL pass to WR Michael Jenkins for a 62-yard TD pass. Afterwards, RB Michael Turner (acquired from the Chargers) made an immediate impact as he got a 66-yard TD run and a 5-yard TD run. In the second quarter, the Lions responded with RB Kevin Smith getting a 5-yard TD run, while quarterback Jon Kitna completed a 21-yard TD pass to WR Roy Williams. In the third quarter, the Falcons went back to work as kicker Jason Elam got a 50-yard field goal, while RB Jerious Norwood got a 10-yard TD run. Detroit tried to rally as Kitna completed a 1-yard TD pass to TE Casey FitzSimmons. Atlanta closed out their rout in the fourth quarter with Elam nailing a 25-yard field goal.

With the impressive win, the Falcons began their season at 1–0.

Quarterback Matt Ryan had a good rookie debut completing 9 of 13 passes for 161 yards and a touchdown. RB Michael Turner had an outstanding Falcon debut, setting a single-game franchise record with 220 rushing yards. Ryan, who became the first rookie to start a season for the Falcons since Steve Bartkowski in 1975, finished with a solid 161 passing yards and 137.0 quarterback rating. Turner led a ground game that picked up a franchise-record 318 rushing yards 7.6 yards per carry. Game Notes.

- With the 34–21 victory, Mike Smith earned his first win as a head coach in the NFL
- Following a 44–41 victory over the Seattle Seahawks in the 2007 season finale, the Falcons posted back-to-back games with over 30 points.
- The win gave the Falcons their first season opening victory since 2006 (20–6 vs. Carolina), their first season opening win at the Georgia Dome since 2005 (vs. Philadelphia, 14–10) and their first win against the Lions at home since 2002 (36–15).
- By opening the game as a starter, LB Keith Brooking extended his consecutive games starting streak to 113 games dating back to 2000, which moved him past long-time C Jeff Van Note into second place in Falcons history. (Former T Bob Whitfield holds the record with 123 consecutive starts, from week 1, 1993 to week 11, 2000.)
- Center Todd McClure also extended his consecutive games starting streak to 97-straight games to move past DE Patrick Kerney and WR Terance Mathis into fifth place all-time in that category.
- The Falcons had 10 players earn opening day starts for the first time in their NFL careers. The players were QB Matt Ryan, LT Sam Baker, RB Michael Turner, TE Ben Hartsock, RG Harvey Dahl, RT Tyson Clabo, DT Jonathan Babineaux, MLB Curtis Lofton, CB Brent Grimes and CB Chris Houston.
- Curtis Lofton became the first rookie to man the middle of the Falcons defense on opening day since linebacker Buddy Curry in 1980. It was exactly 28 years ago on this date, September 7, 1980, that Curry (the team's second round draft pick) started in the middle of the Falcons defense (at Minnesota, 8 tackles, 0.5 sack).
- The Falcons broke a team rushing record with 318 yards and 7.4 avg. against Detroit. The previous record was set on September 17, 2006, against Tampa Bay with 306 yards. Atlanta's 318 yards marked the first game Atlanta totaled over 200 rushing yards since December 3, 2006, against Washington, with 256 yards.
- On Atlanta's first offensive possession of the 2008 season, the Falcons recorded a three-play 74-yard drive that was capped off by WR Michael Jenkins 62-yard touchdown reception from rookie QB Matt Ryan, his first career NFL pass.
- Matt Ryan became the first quarterback to throw a touchdown on his first career NFL pass since October 8, 2000, when Michael Bishop completed the feat as member of the New England Patriots.
- Michael Jenkins 62-yard touchdown reception was the longest of his career and the longest touchdown pass recorded by the Falcons since December 23, 2007, when Chris Redman completed a 74-touchdown against Arizona.
- Atlanta's 62-yard touchdown to WR Michael Jenkins on the first offensive possession of the game was the longest touchdown pass for the Falcons on opening day since September 3, 2000, when Chris Chandler completed a 48-yard touchdown in a 36–28 win.
- The last time the Falcons scored a touchdown on their opening offensive possession of a game came against the Carolina Panthers on November 11, 2007. Atlanta won the game 20–13.
- On Atlanta's second possession of the game, RB Michael Turner rushed for a 66-yard touchdown to give the Falcons a 14–0 lead. The 66-yard scamper was the fourth-longest rush in Turner's career and the seventh-longest rush in Falcons history.
- Michael Turner's 117 rushing yards in the first quarter were the most in an opening quarter of a game for the Falcons in at least two decades.
- Atlanta's 216 yards of total offense in the first quarter was also the highest total in over two decades. The previous high for the Falcons was on October 13, 1991, with 172 yards against San Francisco.
- Michael Turner ran for 220 yards in his debut with the Falcons. This marked the highest single-game rushing record for the Falcons, formerly held by Gerald Riggs, who set the previous record of 202 rushing yards on September 2, 1984.

==== Week 2: at Tampa Bay Buccaneers ====
Quarter	1	2	3	4	Total
Falcons	0	3	3	3	9
Buccaneers	7	10	0	7	24

at Raymond James Stadium, Tampa, Florida

- Game time: 4:05 pm EDT
- Game weather: 89 °F (32 °C) (Partly cloudy)
- Game attendance: 63,611
- Referee: Jeff Triplette
- TV announcers (Fox): Ron Pitts, Tony Boselli, & Nischelle Turner

Following their outstanding home win over the Lions, the Falcons flew to Raymond James Stadium for a Week 2 NFC South duel with the Tampa Bay Buccaneers. In the first quarter, Atlanta trailed as Bucs QB Brian Griese completed a 5-yard TD pass to TE John Gilmore. In the second quarter, the Falcons continued to trail as former Falcons RB Warrick Dunn gave Tampa Bay a 17-yard TD run, along with kicker Matt Bryant getting a 33-yard field goal. Atlanta closed out the half with kicker Jason Elam getting a 32-yard field goal. In the third quarter, the Falcons crept closer as Elam kicked a 27-yard field goal. In the fourth quarter, Atlanta tried to rally as Elam nailed a 24-yard field goal. However, the Buccaneers pulled away as RB Earnest Graham got a 68-yard TD run. With the loss, the Falcons fell to 1–1. With Michael Turner running for a franchise-record 220 yards in his Falcons debut, Ryan only threw the ball 13 times against Detroit. Sunday, he had more attempts than that in the first half alone. The Bucs limited Turner to 42 yards on 14 carries. WR Joey Galloway, who did not play in the preseason because of a sore groin, sprained an ankle in the fourth quarter. Falcons rookie LT Sam Baker was hit in the head in the first half and did not return. A week after beating Detroit in his pro debut, Matt Ryan threw incompletions on his first nine passes before settling down to keep Atlanta in the game with three field goal drives that trimmed a 17-point deficit to eight with five minutes to go.

- The Falcons defense allowed Tampa Bay to rush for only two yards in the first quarter on six attempts. The Buccaneers two yards is the lowest total for a Falcons opponent in the first quarter of a game since December 14, 2003, when the Indianapolis Colts posted two rushing yards on seven carries. At the end of the first half, Tampa's rushing total was 36 yards, the lowest total for a Falcons opponent in the first half of play since December 31, 2006, when Philadelphia only managed 34 yards in the first two-quarters.
- Matt Ryan led the Falcons on a 13-play, 75-yard scoring drive in the third quarter, which was capped by a Jason Elam 27-yard field goal. Ryan completed six of seven passes on the drive for 62 yards.
- On his second career carry, wide receiver Harry Douglas took an end-around and rushed for 33 yards to give the Falcons their third first down of the game. The 33-yard scamper is the second longest rush for Atlanta in two games this season.
- With two minutes remaining in the second quarter, wide receiver/punt returner Adam Jennings set a career-high with a 37-yard punt return topping his old mark of 23 yards set in 2007. The return was also the longest for the Falcons since Allen Rossum returned a punt 37 yards against Cleveland on November 12, 2006. Jennings’ punt return led to a Falcons 32-yard field goal by Elam, the first points of the game for Atlanta.
- Elam notched three field goals of 32, 27 and 25 yards to extend his streak of splitting the uprights to 20 consecutive kicks.
- Atlanta defensive tackle Jonathan Babineaux dropped Buccaneers quarterback Brian Griese in the third quarter for his 5.5th career sack. The sack led to a Tampa Bay punt on its first offensive possession of the second half. Three of Babineaux's 5.5 career sacks have come in the first two games of a season (2.0 in 2007, 1.0 in 2008).
- Falcons defensive end John Abraham posted his fourth sack of the season and his sixth in three consecutive games when he dropped Griese in the fourth quarter to stall a Buccaneers drive in the red zone. On the sack, Abraham forced a fumble which was recovered by defensive tackle Jason Jefferson. The sack was Abraham's 14th in the last 17 games and the 71.5th of his career. The fumble recovery by Jefferson was the first of his career.
- Following Abraham's fourth quarter sack, the Falcons have now recorded three consecutive games with at least two sacks dating back to the 2007 season finale against the Seattle Seahawks.
- Head Coach Mike Smith is one for one in challenges after challenging the spot of the ball on a Roddy White reception in the third quarter. After the review the officials determined White had reached the first down marker, which kept the Atlanta drive alive.

==== Week 3: vs. Kansas City Chiefs ====
Quarter	1	2	3	4	Total
Chiefs	0	7	7	0	14
Falcons	14	10	7	7	38

at Georgia Dome, Atlanta

- Game time: 1:00 pm EDT
- Game weather: Played Indoors, Domed Stadium
- Game attendance: 63,611
- Referee: Scott Green
- TV announcers (CBS): Gus Johnson & Steve Tasker

Michael Turner ran for three touchdowns and the Atlanta Falcons scored the first 24 points to beat Kansas City 38–14, giving the Chiefs their 12th straight loss.

Turner had scoring runs of 4, 1 and 2 yards, his first career game with three rushing touchdowns, while leading the Falcons with 104 yards rushing. Jerious Norwood added 75 yards rushing. Turner dragged Chiefs linebacker Pat Thomas for a few steps before breaking free and running through other defenders for a 38-yard run from the Falcons 8. A 30-yard pass from Ryan to Norwood helped set up Turner first touchdown run. Turner 1-yard scoring run in the second quarter gave Atlanta a 24–0 lead. Turner determined run helped to soften the Kansas City defense. Ryan found Roddy White for a 70-yard touchdown pass on Atlanta's next possession, and the Falcons were on their way to a big early lead, ( Ryan 70-yard touchdown pass to White is the longest pass completion for the Falcons since 12/23/07 when wide receiver Laurent Robinson caught a 74-yard touchdown pass from quarterback Chris Redman against the Arizona Cardinals in a Week 16 meeting).

On Kansas City first offensive possession of the game, defensive end John Abraham logged his fifth sack of the season, which led to a Chiefs punt. Abraham tallied his second sack of the game at the end of the third quarter, which included a forced fumble. The two sacks gave Abraham eight in his last four games, 16 in his last 18 games and 73.5 for his career. Entering the Kansas City game, he led the NFL with four sacks after three games, the forced fumble was the 29th of his career, which ranks fourth in the NFL from 2000 to 2008. Turner sparked an Atlanta scoring drive when he posted a 38-yard rush in the first quarter, he capped the drive with a four-yard touchdown, his third of the season. The Falcons drove 92 yards in six plays and also received help from running back Jerious Norwood on the drive who contributed with 45 combined yards (two rushes for 15 yards and one 30-yard reception). Atlanta 92-yard scoring drive, the first of the game, is the longest scoring drive since 12/3/06 at Washington when the Falcons drove 98 yards on six plays capped by a Norwood touchdown run. Kicker Jason Elam was successful on his long field goal attempt of 27 yards against Kansas City, improving his streak of consecutive field goals to 27. Elam also added five extra points for an eight-point day.

Tyler Thigpen, the third starting quarterback in three weeks for Kansas City, threw three interceptions in his first career start. The third interception, by cornerback Chris Houston, was returned 10 yards for a touchdown with 1:01 left in the game.

Chiefs coach Herman Edwards said during the week he would turn to veteran Damon Huard if Thigpen struggled. Thigpen played the full game and was 14-for-36 passing for 128 yards with one touchdown. Down 24–0, Thigpen led a 13-play scoring drive capped by his 15-yard touchdown pass to Dwayne Bowe with three seconds left in the first half.

The Chiefs' 12th straight loss came 11 months to the day after their last win. They lost their last nine games in 2007 after a 12–10 win at Oakland on October 21, 2007. The Chiefs comeback continued when Larry Johnson's 48-yard run set up his 1-yard scoring plunge to open the second half, cutting Atlanta lead to 24–14. It was Johnson first rushing touchdown of the season. Johnson, who had 96 yards rushing in his first two games, had 24 carries for 121 yards and a touchdown. Johnson has 4,981 yards rushing for his career to pass Christian Okoye (4,897) for second place on the Chiefs all-time list.

The Falcons had a quick answer to Johnson touchdown. Ryan, making his third start, had a 15-yard run and a 17-yard pass to White to set up Turner third touchdown, a 2-yard run. The Chiefs were forced to punt on their first five possessions. Their next two drives ended with interceptions by Erik Coleman and Brent Grimes, Coleman intercepted his first career pass in a Falcons uniform, which also gave him the eighth of his career, it was Coleman first interception since 11/12/06 against the New England Patriots. Coleman pieced together a stellar performance against the Chiefs which included 10 tackles to lead the team and one forced fumble, and Grimes intercepted his first career pass when he stepped in front of a Tyler Thigpen pass in the second quarter. Grimes returned the interception 25 yards, which led to a Falcons touchdown. The Falcons defense allowed only 14 rushing yards in the first quarter against the Kansas City Chiefs, continuing their trend of holding opponents to under 15 rushing yards over the first three contests of the season. Against Tampa Bay in Week 2, Atlanta held the Bucs to two rushing yards in the opening 15 minutes of play, which was the lowest total in the first quarter of a game since for a Falcons opponent since 12/14/03 (vs. Colts, two rushing yards). Below is a look at Atlanta opponent rushing totals in the first quarter of each game this season.

The Falcons moved to 2–0 at the Georgia Dome on the season and gave Head Coach Mike Smith his second career win as a head coach.

Michael Turner became only the fifth Falcons running back in team history to register three or more touchdowns in a game, with the win over the Chiefs improved its record to 5–1 in its last six meetings against AFC West opponents.

Player	Opponent	Date	Rushing TDs
T. J. Duckett	Oakland Raiders	12/12/04	4
Michael Turner	Kansas City Chiefs	9/21/08	3
Jamal Anderson	Detroit Lions	10/6/96	3
Lynn Cain	Los Angeles Rams	10/7/84	3
Gerald Riggs	Los Angeles Rams	11/17/85	3

==== Week 4: at Carolina Panthers ====
Quarter	1	2	3	4	Total
Falcons	3	6	0	0	9
Panthers	7	7	3	7	24

at Bank of America Stadium, Charlotte, North Carolina

- Game time: 1:00 pm EST
- Game weather: 78 °F (26 °C) (Partly cloudy)
- Game attendance: 72,688
- Referee: Ed Hochuli
- TV announcers (Fox): Ron Pitts, Tony Boselli, & Charissa Thompson

Coming off their home win over the Chiefs, the Falcons flew to Bank of America Stadium for a Week 4 NFC South duel with the Carolina Panthers. The Falcons found a way to stick around for three-quarters in Sunday game at Bank of America Stadium but injuries, dropped passes and untimely penalties filled the afternoon. Atlanta lost starting strong safety Lawyer Milloy in the first half after he took a shot to the ribs and played the entire game without starting left tackle Sam Baker. In the first quarter, Atlanta trailed early as Panthers RB Jonathan Stewart getting an 8-yard TD run. The Falcons responded with kicker Jason Elam getting a 33-yard field goal. In the second quarter, the Falcons crept closer as Elam kicked a 44-yard field goal. However, Carolina answered with quarterback Jake Delhomme completing a 56-yard TD pass to WR Steve Smith. Atlanta closed out the half with Elam getting a 44-yard field goal. The Panthers (3–1, 1–0) lost starting offensive tackles Jordan Gross and Jeff Otah in the game to injury and also went several series without starting cornerback Ken Lucas. But that didn't stop the NFC South leaders from imposing their will on both sides of the ball and put up more than 400 yards of total offense. For the fourth consecutive game this season, the Falcons defense held their opponent to 16 rushing yards or less in the first quarter of play after the Panthers managed only 16 yards on six carries. John Abraham blocked his first career punt in the second quarter, which led to Elam second field goal of the day. The blocked punt was the first for Atlanta since the 2004 season finale when Demorrio Williams blocked Seattle first kick of the game at Qwest Field. Running back Jerious Norwood posted his second longest rush of the season with a 40-yard scamper in the second quarter. The rush was four yards shy of his season high (44), which he set against Kansas City in Week 3. Norwood has now posted five rushes of 40 yards or more in this three-year career, punter Michael Koenen booted his longest punt of the season with a 60-yard kick in the second quarter. The punt is the longest for Koenen since December 16, 2007, when he nailed a 63-yard punt against the Tampa Bay Buccaneers, running back Jason Snelling earned his first career start while tight end Justin Peelle started his first game in a Falcons uniform. Brian Finneran caught his first pass of the 2008 campaign on a five-yard reception in the second quarter. The catch was the first for Finneran since the 2005 season finale when he caught four passes for 45 yards against the Carolina Panthers. Roddy White led the Falcons in receiving with seven catches for 90 yards. He continues to remain on pace for a 1,000-yard season. In his fourth career start, rookie quarterback Matt Ryan completed passes to eight different receivers, a season-high for the Boston College graduate, Ryan finished the game having completed 21 of 41 passes for 158 yards and a 60.8 passer rating

In the third quarter, the Panthers increased their lead with kicker John Kasay nailing a 44-yard field goal. In the fourth quarter, Carolina sealed the win with Delhomme completing a 36-yard TD pass to WR Muhsin Muhammad. The first-year head coach Mike Smith made a concise list in explaining the problems that plagued his offense in Charlotte.

- Third down conversions (the Falcons were 2-of-13)
- Red zone penalties (two knocked the Birds outside the 10)
- six dropped passes (three on third down)

With the loss, the Falcons fell to 2–2.

==== Week 5: at Green Bay Packers ====
Quarter	1	2	3	4	Total
Falcons	10	7	0	10	27
Packers	0	7	3	14	24

at Lambeau Field, Green Bay, Wisconsin

- Game time: 1:00 pm EST/12:00 pm CST
- Game weather: 60 °F (16 °C) (Sunny)
- Game attendance: 70,610
- Referee: Carl Cheffers
- TV announcers (Fox): Ron Pitts, Tony Boselli, & Charissa Thompson

Hoping to rebound from their divisional road loss to the Panthers, to Falcons flew to Lambeau Field for a Week 5 duel with the Green Bay Packers. Entering Week 5, the Falcons led the league in first quarter scoring with 38 points. Atlanta added to that total with 10 points on a touchdown and field goal. The Falcons have also outscored their opponents in the first quarter by a 48–14 margin.

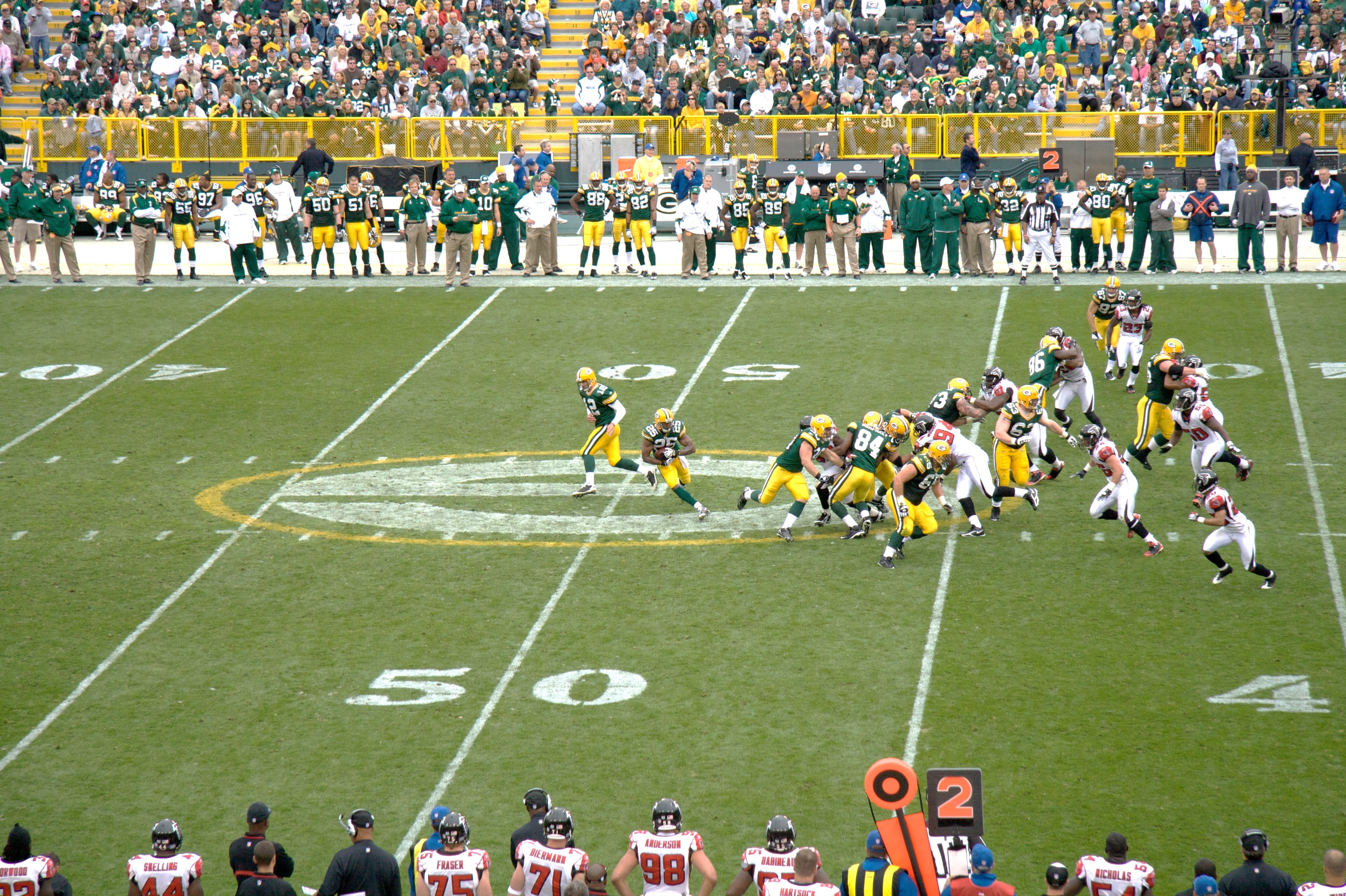
Green Bay Packers quarterback Aaron Rodgers hands off to Ryan Grant in Atlanta's week 5 encounter at Lambeau Field

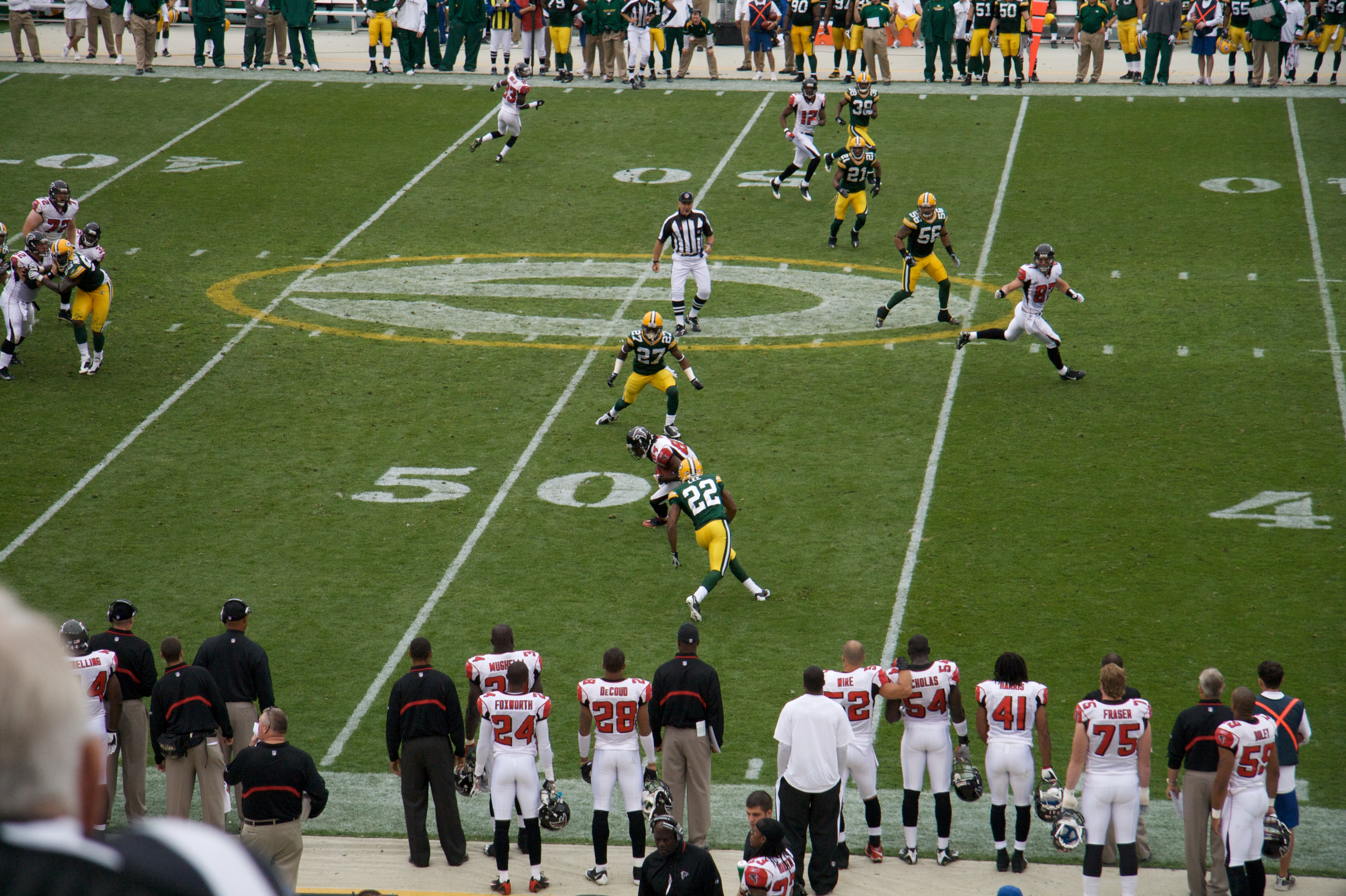
Green Bay DB Patrick Lee#22 chases Atlanta wide receiver #84 Roddy White

Michael Turner posted his third 100-yard game of the season after finishing with 26 carries for 121 yards and one touchdown. Turner score came at the 3:35 mark in the fourth quarter to give Atlanta a two-possession lead (27–17) which sealed the victory. In the first quarter, Atlanta took flight as rookie quarterback Matt Ryan completed a 1-yard TD pass to TE Justin Peelle, along with kicker Jason Elam getting a 42-yard field goal. In the second quarter, the Packers responded with quarterback Aaron Rodgers completing a 44-yard TD pass to WR Donald Driver. The Falcons closed out the half with Ryan completing a 22-yard TD pass to WR Roddy White to give the Falcons a 17–7 advantage. The catch was his sixth of the day giving White 115 yards in the first half at that point. White contributed with 67 first quarter receiving yards, falling three yards short of his career-high in the first 15 minutes of play (70), which he set on September 21, 2008, against Kansas City. White also finished the first half with 132 yards, which is the most in two-quarters of play for the four-year veteran in his career and the second highest total since Terance Mathis posted 136 on November 19, 1995. On Atlanta first play of the game, Quarterback Matt Ryan completed a 37-yard pass to White crossing into Packers territory. Ryan completed two more receptions to White on the drive for a total of 64 yards, the three completions led to an Atlanta touchdown, which marked the second occasion this season the Falcons scored on their first drive of the game (Week 1 vs. Detroit) and the first time they scored on their first possession of the game on the road, Ryan started the game having completed six of six passes for 72 yards and one touchdown pass, also compiled the best half of football in his rookie career thus far when he completed 13 of 18 passes for 154 yards, two touchdowns and no interceptions for a 135.0 passer rating. Ryan finished the game with a season-high 194 passing yards. The Falcons posted a touchdown on their first offensive possession of the game when Ryan led the team 81 yards on 10 plays and completed a one-yard touchdown strike to tight end Justin Peelle, his first as an Atlanta Falcon and the eighth of his career. Center Ben Wilkerson saw his first action of the season at the center position when he briefly replaced Todd McClure on Atlanta first offensive drive of the game. Wilkerson was at center when the Falcons scored their first touchdown in the first quarter. Defensive tackle Grady Jackson logged his first sack of the season and the 34.5th of his career when he dropped Packers quarterback Aaron Rodgers on Green Bay first offensive play of the game, the sack led to a Green Bay punt. Following the first quarter of play the Falcons recorded eight first downs opposed to the Packers who finished the opening 15 minutes of play with zero. Atlanta also racked-up 147 net yards to Green Bay's 10 in the quarter.

At the 6:02 mark in the second quarter, Ryan tallied his second touchdown pass of the day when he found White in the end zone for a 22-yard strike to give the Falcons a 17–7 advantage. The catch was his sixth of the day giving White 115 yards in the first half at that point. White pieced together his second 100-yard receiving game of the season and the ninth of his career after catching eight passes for 132 yards and one touchdown. Following the two-minute mark in the second quarter, defensive end John Abraham notched his seventh sack of the season, dropping Rodgers. The sack was the ninth in his last six games, the 17th in his last 20 contests and the 74.5th of his career. The sack forced a Packers field goal attempt and following an offensive holding call on a converted attempt, Green Bay missed a re-kick.

In the third quarter, Green Bay answered with kicker Mason Crosby getting a 50-yard field goal. In the fourth quarter, the Packers tied the game with Rodgers completing a 25-yard TD pass to WR Greg Jennings, Michael Boley intercepted his first pass of the season and the fifth of his career when he stepped in front of an Aaron Rodgers pass late in the fourth quarter. The INT led to the game-sealing touchdown by Turner, yet Atlanta replied with Elam nailing a 41-yard field goal and RB Michael Turner getting a 2-yard TD run. Fullback Ovie Mughelli carried the ball nine yards on his first rush of the season in the fourth quarter. Following a Packers touchdown to tie the game at 17, running back/kick returner Jerious Norwood returned the ensuing kickoff 54 yards into Green Bay territory, marking the second-longest kickoff return of his career, Norwood return set up a Falcons game-sealing touchdown. Green Bay tried to rally as Rodgers completed a 4-yard TD pass to TE Donald Lee, yet the Falcons' defense stiffened for the win.

With the win, Atlanta improved to 3–2.

- An Atlanta 27–24 victory gave the Falcons their first win on the road this season and their first victory at Lambeau Field since the 2002 NFC Wild Card playoff.

==== Week 6: vs. Chicago Bears ====
Quarter	1	2	3	4	Total
Bears	0	3	7	10	20
Falcons	6	3	3	10	22

at Georgia Dome, Atlanta

- Game time: 1:00 pm EDT
- Game weather: None (Domed Stadium)
- Game attendance: 64,096
- Referee: Alberto Riveron
- TV announcers (Fox): Thom Brennaman & Brian Billick

Coming off their road win over the Packers, the Falcons went home for a Week 6 duel with the Chicago Bears. In the first quarter, Atlanta took flight as kicker Jason Elam got a 29-yard and a 48-yard field goal. In the second quarter, the Falcons increased their lead as Elam kicked a 32-yard field goal. The Bears responded with kicker Robbie Gould getting a 36-yard field goal. Entering Sunday game with the Bears, the Falcons led the NFL in first quarter scoring with 48 points. After posting two field goals for a 6–0 lead following the first 15 minutes of play against Chicago, Atlanta has now outscored its opponent in the first quarter by a 54–14 margin.

A chance at a touchdown came with 9:16 remaining in the first half after a curious turn of events near the goal line. A third-down run by Jerious Norwood came up short and ended with a fumble. Bears defensive tackle Tommie Harris recovered but lost the ball before he was touched down. Jason Snelling recovered the ball for the Falcons, who got a fresh set of downs. Following the first half of play, the Falcons defense held the Bears to 20 first half rushing yards. The 20 yards are the fewest given up in the first half of a game by Atlanta's defense since October 1, 2006, against Arizona (two yards).

In the third quarter, the Falcons continued to add onto their lead as Elam got a 41-yard field goal, yet Chicago answered with RB Matt Forté getting a 3-yard TD run. In the fourth quarter, Atlanta replied with rookie quarterback Matt Ryan completing a 3-yard TD pass to WR Roddy White. Defensive end Jamaal Anderson paced a defense that fed off the crowd's energy. He finished with four tackles (two for loss) and the first sack of his two-year career. Anderson also had two pass deflections on the Bears' first drive of the second quarter. The Falcons offense started the second half with a no-huddle offense and added another Elam field goal to take a 12–3 lead. Chicago stuck with the running game and added a touchdown from Forte with 2:24 remaining in the third quarter. Chicago drove within inches of the end zone, but Matt Forte was stuffed on fourth down as he attempted to leap across the line. Michael Boley came in low to trip up the runner, then Lawyer Milloy and Keith Brooking finished him off. The Bears took the lead with Gould getting a 32-yard field goal, along with quarterback Kyle Orton completing a 17-yard TD pass to WR Rashied Davis. The Falcons got the last laugh as Elam nailed the game-winning 48-yard field goal. The 16-year veteran's celebration was interrupted by a swarm of teammates near midfield. It was his fifth successful kick of the day but just moments before, he missed a kick that could have iced the game. Chicago came off the miscue with a 77-yard touchdown drive to take a 20–19 lead with 11 seconds to play. But a 9-yard return off a short kickoff by Harry Douglas and a 26-yard strike from rookie quarterback Matt Ryan to Michael Jenkins set Elam up for the game-winner with 1 second left.

"I'm really happy that one went through", Elam said. "Our guys have been fighting so hard for so long. I hate to even mention what happened last year but to hear some of the stories I know the guys are really hungry to get some wins on the board and show our fans what we're all about." With time to throw Ryan thrived. The rookie found five different receivers and performed regular Houdini-like acts to find open players down the field for third-down conversions. Fellow rookie Douglas caught five passes for 96 yards including a 47-yard strike on third down that set up a 3-yard scoring toss to White with 13:25 remaining. Ryan opened the game 8-of-8 for 107 yards and captained nearly identical scoring drives in the first quarter, leading the team on 48- and 49-yard marches that ended with field goals. "I think everybody is excited with the win", Ryan said. "I thought we played a very good Chicago Bears team today. They played an entire 60 minutes and we did the same thing. We just had the last punch. We were able to make a couple big plays at the end of the game with Elam clutch kick being the biggest one. This win is a great story heading into the bye week." Bears CB Nathan Vasher (wrist) missed his second straight game, and the other starting corner, Charles Tillman, went out in the first half with a shoulder injury. Backup FS Danieal Manning left, too, with an injured hamstring., White went over 100 yards receiving for the second week in a row, Forte led the Bears with 76 yards rushing.

With the win, Atlanta entered their bye week at 4–2.

Not only did Matt Ryan (22/30 for 301 yards and a touchdown) pick up his first-ever 300-yard day, but he acquired the best record for a rookie quarterback in his first six games as a starter since 1998 (4–2), besting Kyle Orton in '05 and Kyle Boller in '03 (both with 3–3).

==== Week 8: at Philadelphia Eagles ====
Quarter	1	2	3	4	Total
Falcons	0	7	0	7	14
Eagles	0	10	7	10	27

at Lincoln Financial Field, Philadelphia

- Game time: 1:00 pm EDT
- Game weather: 63 °F (17 °C) (Sunny)
- Game attendance: 69,144
- Referee: Jerome Boger
- TV announcers (Fox): Sam Rosen, Tim Ryan, & Chris Myers

Coming off their bye week, the Falcons flew to Lincoln Financial Field for a Week 8 duel with the Philadelphia Eagles, as rookie quarterback Matt Ryan (a native of the Philly suburb of Exton, Pennsylvania) took on his hometown team. Ryan threw for 277 yards in his seventh career start but also had a pair of interceptions. The defense held the Eagles after the first turnover but Ryan's second mistake came in the end zone, eliminating a red-zone scoring chance.

After a scoreless first quarter, Atlanta finally took flight in the second quarter as Ryan completed a 55-yard TD pass to WR Roddy White with 8:56 remaining in the first half when he threaded a pass between two Eagles defenders. White scampered toward the end zone for a 55-yard score and a 7–0 lead."We had worked on that fade pass all week in practice and Matt threw it up there and really I should have batted the ball down", said White, who had 113 receiving yards. "I think on that play, I had the responsibility to help him out. We thought we were going to put some points on the board and we let it get away from us. I put that play on myself, because I really should have knocked that down." White tallied his third consecutive 100-yard game after catching eight passes for 113 yards and two touchdowns. White has now posted four 100-yard games this season and 11 for his career, the 55-yard strike is the third longest pass for the rookie quarterback this season. The second score came on an eight-yard pass in the fourth quarter, Ryan returned to the sight of first collegiate touchdown pass at Lincoln Financial Field against the Temple Owls on November 20, 2004.

But Philadelphia responded with 20 unanswered points, including scoring drives of 60, 70 and 69 yards. Twice McNabb scrambled for key first downs. The Falcons did not record a sack in the second half. The Falcons run game sputtered and suffered from untimely penalties. Starting left tackle Sam Baker missed the game with a hip injury and was replaced by Todd Weiner. Weiner left with an injury and was replaced by Quinn Ojinnaka. Michael Turner rushed for 58 yards on 17 carries. The Eagles took the lead with quarterback Donovan McNabb getting a 3-yard TD run, along with kicker David Akers getting a 36-yard field goal. McNabb turned from prolific passer to game-manager as the afternoon progressed, finding openings in the Falcons zone defense for short to medium gains and handing the ball off to Westbrook, the All-Pro rushed for 63 yards on 10 carries in the first half and finished with 22 carries for 167 yards. He also had six catches for 42 yards, one of six Eagles receivers with two or more catches. The Falcons spent much of the first half keeping McNabb and the Eagles high-flying offense on the ground. Atlanta didn't allow a first-quarter-point for the fifth time this season and picked up two sacks, a forced fumble and a turnover in the first 30 minutes In the third quarter, the Falcons continued to trail as RB Brian Westbrook got a 16-yard TD run. In the fourth quarter, Philadelphia increased its lead with Akers nailing an 18-yard field goal. Brian Finneran tied his season-high in receptions (three) and contributed with two catches on third down to convert a new set a downs for the Falcons on both occasions in the first half. Jerious Norwood posted his second-highest receiving total when he caught five passes for 55 yards, he set his career-high of 57 yards against the Saints last season Atlanta tried to rally as Ryan hooked up with White again on an 8-yard TD pass, but the Eagles flew away as Westbrook got a 39-yard TD run. A late goal-line stand held the Eagles to a field goal and kept it a two-possession game with 7:57 remaining. Ryan led a no-huddle offense into the red zone on the next series and found White with a second touchdown with less than four minutes to play. Trailing 20–14, the Falcons defense stepped up with a key three-and-out but an odd turn of events kept the Birds offense from getting a shot at the win. Return man Adam Jennings decided at the last second not to field the punt after the Eagles' three-and-out drive. Officials ruled Jennings touched the ball and the muffed punt was recovered by the Eagles. The Falcons did not have a timeout left and, by rule, could not challenge the play. Replays in the press box showed Jennings did not touch the ball. Three plays later Westbrook rushed over the left side for a 39-yard, game-clinching touchdown. Defensive end Jamaal Anderson posted his second sack of the season when he dropped Eagles quarterback Donovan McNabb for a six-yard loss in the first quarter, the sack stalled an Eagles drive, forcing a punt. Anderson has now totaled one sack in two consecutive games. Rookie Curtis Lofton earned his first career sack when he dropped McNabb for an eight-yard loss in the second quarter while forcing a fumble. The ball was recovered by defensive end Chauncey Davis. "It never felt like we were out of the game, even when we didn't get that touchdown when we needed it, it still felt like we stopped them to get a chance to put some more points on the board and that's what we did", defensive end John Abraham said. "Like I said, it's part of the game and everybody played well, it was a tough fought game. I think everybody got a lot of bumps and bruises from the game, but it definitely was a good game." With the loss, the Falcons fell to 4–3.

==== Week 9: at Oakland Raiders ====
Quarter	1	2	3	4	Total
Falcons	14	10	0	0	24
Raiders	0	0	0	0	0

at Oakland–Alameda County Coliseum, Oakland, California

- Game time: 4:15 pm EDT/1:15 pm PST
- Game weather: 63 °F (17 °C) (Sunny)
- Game attendance: 61,196
- Referee: Walt Anderson
- TV announcers (Fox): Matt Vasgersian, J.C. Pearson, & Nischelle Turner

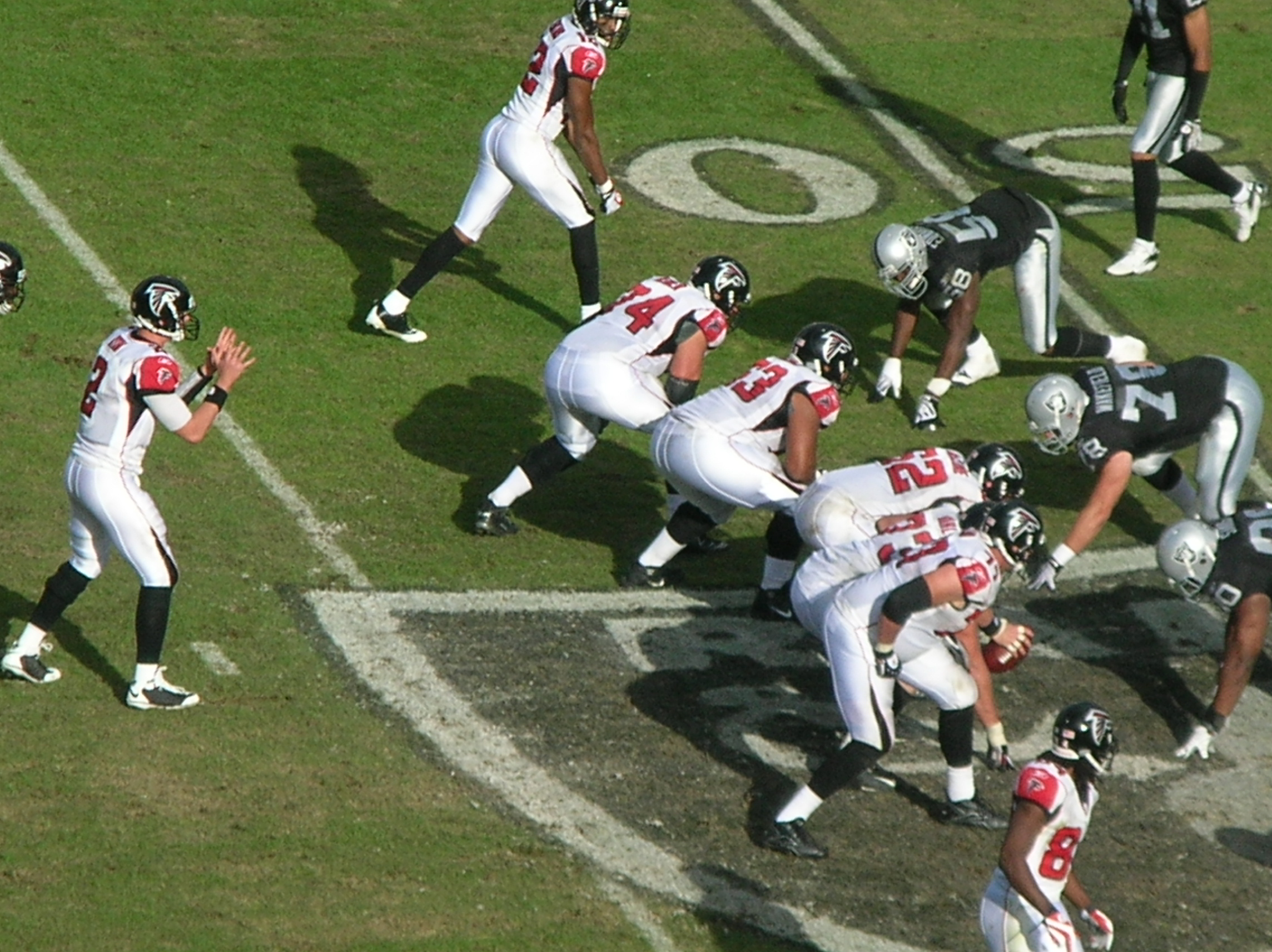
Ryan takes a snap against the Raiders on November 2.

Hoping to rebound from their road loss to the Eagles, the Falcons flew to the Oakland–Alameda County Coliseum for a Week 9 interconference duel with the Oakland Raiders. In the first quarter, Atlanta took flight as rookie quarterback Matt Ryan completed a 37-yard TD pass to WR Michael Jenkins, while RB Jerious Norwood got a 12-yard TD run. In the second quarter, the Falcons added onto their lead with Ryan hooking up with Jenkins again on a 27-yard TD pass, along with kicker Jason Elam nailing a 48-yard field goal. From there on out, Atlanta cruised towards its easy win, as they greatly outgained the Raiders in time of possession (45:15 to 14:45) and total offensive yards (453 to 77).

With the easy win, the Falcons improved to 5–3.

==== Week 10: vs. New Orleans Saints ====
Quarter	1	2	3	4	Total
Saints	3	3	0	14	20
Falcons	7	10	3	14	34

at Georgia Dome, Atlanta

- Game time: 1:00 p.m. EDT
- Game weather: None (Domed Stadium)
- Game attendance: 64,826
- Referee: Gene Steratore
- TV announcers (Fox): Ron Pitts, Tony Boselli, & Charissa Thompson

Coming off their shutout road win over the Raiders, the Falcons went home for a Week 10 NFC South duel with the New Orleans Saints. In the first quarter, Atlanta took flight as rookie quarterback Matt Ryan completed a 16-yard TD pass to WR Roddy White. The Saints responded with kicker Garrett Hartley getting a 24-yard field goal. In the second quarter, the Falcons increased their lead as RB Michael Turner got a 2-yard TD run. New Orleans answered with Hartley making a 44-yard field goal. Atlanta closed out the half as kicker Jason Elam got a 22-yard field goal.

In the third quarter, the Falcons got the period's only points as Elam nailed a 27-yard field goal. In the fourth quarter, Atlanta continued to soar as Ryan completed a 67-yard TD pass to RB Jerious Norwood. The Saints tried to rally as quarterback Drew Brees completed a 15-yard TD pass to RB Deuce McAllister, yet the Falcons flew away as rookie CB Chevis Jackson returned an interception 95 yards for a touchdown. New Orleans closed out the scoring with Brees completing a 32-yard TD pass to WR Lance Moore.

With the win, Atlanta improved to 6–3.

==== Week 11: vs. Denver Broncos ====
Quarter	1	2	3	4	Total
Broncos	7	0	7	10	24
Falcons	3	10	0	7	20

at Georgia Dome, Atlanta

- Game time: 1:00 pm EST
- Game weather: None (Domed Stadium)
- Game attendance: 64,644
- Referee: Peter Morelli
- TV announcers (CBS): Kevin Harlan & Rich Gannon

Coming off their win over the Saints, the Falcons stayed at home for a Week 11 interconference duel with the Denver Broncos. In the first quarter, Atlanta trailed early as Broncos FB Peyton Hillis got a 7-yard TD run. The Falcons answered with kicker Jason Elam (a former Bronco) getting a 46-yard field goal. In the second quarter, Atlanta took the lead as Elam made a 36-yard field goal, while RB Michael Turner got a 9-yard TD run.

In the third quarter, Denver retook the lead as Hillis got a 2-yard TD run. In the fourth quarter, the Broncos increased their lead as kicker Matt Prater nailed a 20-yard field goal. The Falcons tried to rally as Turner got a 28-yard field goal, yet Denver replied with quarterback Jay Cutler competing a 9-yard TD pass to TE Daniel Graham. From there on out, the Broncos' defense stopped any other possible comeback attempt.

With their first home loss of the year, Atlanta fell to 6–4. This was the first of only two home losses suffered by Matt Ryan in the NFL through December 27, 2010. The second was to the New Orleans Saints on December 27, 2010, the final Monday Night Football game of the 2010 season.

==== Week 12: vs. Carolina Panthers ====
Quarter	1	2	3	4	Total
Panthers	0	3	10	15	28
Falcons	10	7	0	28	45

at Georgia Dome, Atlanta

- Game time: 4:15 pm EST
- Game weather: None (domed stadium)
- Game attendance: 64,841
- Referee: Tony Corrente
- TV announcers (Fox): Thom Brennaman and Brian Billick

Falcons offense against the Panthers in Georgia Dome

Hoping to rebound from their loss to the Broncos, the Falcons stayed at home, donned their alternate uniforms, and played a Week 12 NFC South rematch with the Carolina Panthers. In the first quarter, Atlanta took flight as kicker Jason Elam got a 23-yard field goal, while rookie WR Harry Douglas got a 7-yard TD run. In the second quarter, the Falcons increased their lead as RB Michael Turner got a 1-yard TD run. The Panthers closed out the half as kicker John Kasay got a 23-yard field goal. On his third carry of the game, Turner rushed for a six-yard gain and eclipsed the 1,000-yard rushing plateau this season. He became the first Falcons running back to reach 1,000 yards in a campaign since 2006 when Warrick Dunn had 1,140 and the 20th running back in franchise history to reach 1,000 yards in a season. Turner's career day continued after he tied a team record with four rushing touchdowns of T. J. Duckett posted on December 12, 2004. It was also the second career three-score game and the fourth multiple-touchdown game of his career. Turner first found the end zone on a one-yard rush in the second quarter, scored for the second occasion on a four-yard run in the fourth quarter, logged his third TD on a one-yard run with 7:13 remaining and tallied his last on a 16-yard scamper in the fourth quarter to seal a Falcons 45–28 victory. With four scores, Turner became the third player in Falcons history to post 13 or more rushing touchdowns in a season. Turner finished the game with 24 carries for 117 yards and four touchdowns, which marked his eighth career 100-yard game. Matt Ryan and the offense faced a quick third down on the next possession, but the quarterback found rookie wide receiver Harry Douglas on a 69-yard pass play to the Panthers 6. Four plays later Turner got his key, fourth-down touchdown.

The Panthers faced an energized defense and a raucous crowd on the next possession. Chauncey Davis recorded his second sack of the day and back-to-back false start penalties backed Carolina into the shadow of its own goal line. The Panthers punted from the end zone, giving Douglas a chance for a big return. The rookie brought the kick back up the middle 61 yards for a touchdown. Delhomme found Muhsin Muhammad for a touchdown on the next series but the Falcons had already done plenty of damage. Still, Turner found the end zone for a final time with just 54 seconds to play. Eric Weems caught his first career pass in the first quarter for a four-yard gain. The reception led to a Falcons touchdown. Douglas scored his first two career touchdowns; he first found the end zone on a seven-yard end around in the first quarter to give the Falcons a 10–0 lead; Douglas then became the 10th player in Falcons history to return a punt for a touchdown and the first since 2004 when Allen Rossum returned a kick 61 yards in the fourth quarter. Douglas's return was the longest in his career, topping the previous mark of 33 yards against New Orleans in Week 10; along with a 61-yard punt return, Douglas totaled career-highs in offensive touches with six (two rushing, four receiving and all purpose yards 188, which included 3 rushing, 92 receiving and 93 yards on punt returns), he also became the Falcons' third rookie this season to account for a touchdown; along with Douglas's run and punt return, quarterback Matt Ryan has thrown 11 touchdown passes and cornerback Chevis Jackson returned an interception 95 yards for a score against New Orleans in Week 10, Douglas posted a career-long reception with a 69-yard catch in the fourth quarter. He finished the game with 92 receiving yards, which led the team and fell four yards short of his career high ( 96 yards vs. Chicago, October 12 ). Roddy White caught Ryan first pass of the game for a 30-yard gain, marking the 11th reception of 20-plus yards, White finished the game with four receptions for 70 yards and is 27 yards shy of a 1,000-yard season. Atlanta outscored Carolina in the first quarter by a 10–0 margin, marking the seventh time this season a Falcons opponent was held scoreless in the opening 15 minutes of play. Atlanta outscored its opponents in the first quarter by an 88–24 mark and led the NFL in first quarter scoring entering Sunday's game. Following the first quarter of play, the Falcons offense posted 162 net yards of offense compared to zero by the Panthers. Brian Finneran caught one pass for nine yards on a third down in the second quarter, giving the Falcons a new set of downs. In his career, the nine-year veteran has caught 127 of 187 receptions that have gone for a first down or touchdown (67.9 percent).

John Abraham logged his 12th sack of the season and stalled a Carolina two-minute drive at the end of the second quarter; the sack is the 14th in his last 12 games, his 22nd in his last 26 contests and has now recorded 79.5 for his career. In his tenure with the Falcons, Abraham has posted 26 sacks in 34 games played. Abraham's 12 sacks through 11 games this season already ranks tied for the fifth most in a single season in Falcons history. Atlanta defense held Carolina to three-consecutive three and outs to start the game while allowing only eight net yards; entering Sunday's game, the Falcons ranked fourth in the NFC and eighth in the NFL in opponent three and out drives. Jason Snelling caught a 27-yard pass in the first quarter and broke a tackle to take the ball into Carolina territory, the reception is a career-long for the second-year running back, topping his old mark of 18 yards, which he set earlier in the season at Philadelphia.

In the third quarter, Carolina began to claw their way back into the game as RB DeAngelo Williams got a 5-yard TD run, while Kasay nailed a 21-yard field goal. In the fourth quarter, Atlanta answered with Turner getting a 4-yard TD run. The Panthers replied with quarterback Jake Delhomme getting a 12-yard TD run (along with Williams' 2-point conversion run), yet the Falcons struck right back with Turner getting a 1-yard TD run, while Douglas returned a punt 61-yard field goal. Carolina tried to rally as Delhomme completed a 16-yard TD pass to WR Muhsin Muhammad, yet Atlanta flew away as Turner got a 16-yard TD run. "It was great to get off to a good start and score 17 points", said Ryan, who managed the game with 259 passing yards on a 94.5 passer rating. "For the most part, we were able to maintain our ebb and flow on the offensive side of the ball. Our defense stepped up and did a heck of a job keeping Carolina from making big plays. I didn't think we would score 45 points, but I’ll take that any day."

With the win, the Falcons improved to 7–4.

==== Week 13: at San Diego Chargers ====
Quarter	1	2	3	4	Total
Falcons	6	9	0	7	22
Chargers	7	0	6	3	16

at Qualcomm Stadium, San Diego

- Game time: 4:15 pm EST/1:15 pm PST
- Game weather: 73 °F (23 °C) (sunny)
- Game attendance: 67,200
- Referee: Mike Carey
- TV announcers (Fox): Matt Vasgersian, J. C. Pearson, and Nischelle Turner

Coming off their divisional home win over the Panthers, the Falcons flew to Qualcomm Stadium for a Week 13 interconference duel with the San Diego Chargers. In the first quarter, Atlanta took off as kicker Jason Elam got a 35-yard field goal. The Chargers responded with RB LaDainian Tomlinson getting a 3-yard TD run, yet the Falcons stayed close with Elam getting a 40-yard field goal. In the second quarter, Atlanta regained the lead as rookie quarterback Matt Ryan completed an 18-yard TD pass to TE Justin Peelle, along with their defense forcing opposing quarterback Philip Rivers to commit intentional grounding from his own endzone, giving Atlanta a safety.

In the third quarter, San Diego answered with safety Eric Weddle returning a fumble 86 yards for a touchdown (with a failed two-point conversion). In the fourth quarter, the Falcons replied with Ryan completing a 5-yard TD pass to rookie WR Harry Douglas. The Chargers tried to come back, as kicker Nate Kaeding nailed a 28-yard field goal. Atlanta's defense stiffened for the victory.

With the win, the Falcons improved to 8–4.

==== Week 14: at New Orleans Saints ====
Quarter	1	2	3	4	Total
Falcons	0	14	3	8	25
Saints	7	9	0	13	29

at Louisiana Superdome, New Orleans, Louisiana

- Game time: 1:00 pm EDT
- Game weather: None (Domed Stadium)
- Game attendance: 70,011
- Referee: Bill Leavy
- TV announcers (Fox): Dick Stockton, Brian Baldinger, Brian Billick, & Laura Okmin

Coming off their west coast win over the Chargers, the Falcons flew to the Louisiana Superdome for a Week 14 NFC South rematch with the New Orleans Saints. Atlanta trailed fairly early in the first quarter as Saints quarterback Drew Brees completed a 5-yard touchdown pass to RB Reggie Bush. In the second quarter, the Falcons continued to trail as kicker Garrett Hartley got a 26-yard field goal. Atlanta responded RB Michael Turner getting a 5-yard TD run, yet Hartley gave New Orleans a 46-yard field goal. The Falcons struck back with rookie quarterback Matt Ryan completing a 2-yard TD pass to WR Brian Finneran, but the Saints closed out the half with Hartley's 25-yard field goal.

Atlanta got the third quarter's only points as kicker Jason Elam nailed a 23-yard field goal. In the fourth quarter, New Orleans tried to pull away as Brees completed a 7-yard touchdown pass to RB Pierre Thomas, yet their 2-point conversion attempt failed. The Falcons then took the lead as Ryan got a 12-yard touchdown run, followed by a 2-point pass to wide receiver Michael Jenkins. However, the Saints got the last laugh as Thomas got a 5-yard TD run.

With the loss, Atlanta fell to 8–5.

==== Week 15: vs. Tampa Bay Buccaneers ====
Quarter	1	2	3	4	OT	Total
Buccaneers	0	7	0	3	0	10
Falcons	10	0	0	0	3	13

at Georgia Dome, Atlanta

- Game time: 1:00 pm EDT
- Game weather: None (Domed Stadium)
- Game attendance: 65,045
- Referee: Terry McAulay
- TV announcers (Fox): Dick Stockton, Brian Baldinger, & Laura Okmin

Michael Turner rushed for 152 yards and a touchdown, and Jason Elam kicked the winning 34-yard field goad at 10:56 of overtime to give the Falcons (9–5–0) a much-needed division victory. The Falcons overcame two Matt Ryan interceptions and some sloppy play. The victory over the Buccaneers (9–5–0) kept them in the hunt for a playoff spot, and guaranteed the Falcons first winning season since 2004. Also with the win, the Falcons managed to knock the Saints out of playoff contention. Turner's touchdown was his 15th for the Falcons this season, breaking the record of 14 set in 1998 by Jamal Anderson.

==== Week 16: at Minnesota Vikings ====
Quarter	1	2	3	4	Total
Falcons	7	10	7	0	24
Vikings	7	0	0	10	17

at Hubert H. Humphrey Metrodome, Minneapolis, Minnesota

- Game time: 4:15 pm EST/3:15 pm CST
- Game weather: None (Domed Stadium)
- Game attendance: 62,889
- Referee: Scott Green
- TV announcers (Fox): Dick Stockton, Brian Billick, & Brian Baldinger

Coming off their divisional home win over the Buccaneers, the Falcons flew to the Hubert H. Humphrey Metrodome for a Week 16 battle with the Minnesota Vikings. Atlanta got an early first quarter lead with running back Michael Turner getting a 1-yard touchdown run. The Vikings responded with quarterback Tarvaris Jackson completing a 21-yard touchdown pass to tight end Visanthe Shiancoe. In the second quarter, the Falcons regained the lead as rookie quarterback Matt Ryan completed an 8-yard touchdown pass to running back Jerious Norwood, followed by kicker Jason Elam getting a 22-yard field goal.

Atlanta added to their lead in the third quarter as Ryan tried to run into the endzone for a touchdown, fumbled the ball into the endzone, and offensive guard Justin Blalock recovered it in the end zone for a touchdown. In the fourth quarter, Minnesota tried to come back as kicker Ryan Longwell nailed a 29-yard field goal, along with Jackson hooking up with Shiancoe again on a 17-yard touchdown pass. The Falcon defense stiffened for the win.

With the win, not only did Atlanta improve to 10–5, but they also clinched a playoff berth for the first since 2004.

==== Week 17: vs. St. Louis Rams ====
Quarter	1	2	3	4	Total
Rams	7	7	3	10	27
Falcons	3	14	7	7	31

at Georgia Dome, Atlanta

- Game time: 1:00 pm EST
- Game weather: None (Domed Stadium)
- Game attendance: 64,617
- Referee: Walt Anderson
- TV announcers (Fox): Sam Rosen, Tim Ryan, & Chris Myers

With the playoffs on the horizon, the Falcons closed out the regular season at home in a Week 17 duel with the St. Louis Rams. Atlanta took off in the first quarter with kicker Jason Elam making a 39-yard field goal, but the Rams responded with running back Steven Jackson getting a 4-yard touchdown run. The Falcons answered in the second quarter with a 9-yard touchdown run from running back Michael Turner. St. Louis answered with quarterback Marc Bulger completing a 16-yard touchdown pass to wide receiver Donnie Avery, yet Atlanta took the halftime lead with running back Jerious Norwood's 8-yard touchdown run.

In the third quarter, the Falcons added to their lead with quarterback Matt Ryan completing an 18-yard touchdown pass to wide receiver Roddy White. The Rams closed out the period with kicker Josh Brown making a 31-yard field goal. In the fourth quarter, St. Louis got the lead again as Jackson got a 2-yard touchdown run, followed by Brown nailing a 27-yard field goal. Atlanta then took the lead for good as Norwood got a 45-yard touchdown run.

With the win, the Falcons closed out the regular season at 11–5 and due to Carolina's victory over New Orleans, earned the NFC's #5 seed.

== Postseason ==
=== NFC Wild Card Round: at Arizona Cardinals ===
Quarter	1	2	3	4	Total
Falcons	0	17	0	7	24
Cardinals	7	7	14	2	30

at University of Phoenix Stadium, Glendale, Arizona

- Game time: 4:30 pm EST/2:30 pm MST
- Game weather: None (Dome Closed)
- Game attendance: 62,848
- Referee: John Parry
- TV announcers (NBC): Tom Hammond, Cris Collinsworth, & Tiki Barber

Entering the playoffs as the NFC's fifth seed, the Falcons began their playoff run at the University of Phoenix Stadium against the #4 Arizona Cardinals. Atlanta trailed early in the first quarter as Cardinals quarterback Kurt Warner completed a 42-yard touchdown pass to wide receiver Larry Fitzgerald. The Falcons responded in the second quarter as kicker Jason Elam got a 30-yard field goal, but Arizona answered with Warner completing a 71-yard touchdown pass to wide receiver Anquan Boldin. Afterwards, Atlanta took a halftime lead as running back Michael Turner got a 7-yard touchdown run, followed by rookie quarterback Matt Ryan's 2-yard touchdown pass to tight end Justin Peelle.

In the third quarter, the Cardinals retook the lead as safety Antrel Rolle returned a fumble 27 yards for a touchdown, followed by running back Tim Hightower's 4-yard touchdown run. The Falcons' postseason run was fading in the fourth quarter as Ryan was sacked in his endzone by defensive end Antonio Smith for a safety. Afterwards, Atlanta tried to rally as Ryan completed a 5-yard touchdown pass to wide receiver Roddy White, but Arizona's offense ran out the clock for the win.

With the loss, the Falcons' season ended with an overall record of 11–6.

=== 2009 Pro Bowl selections ===
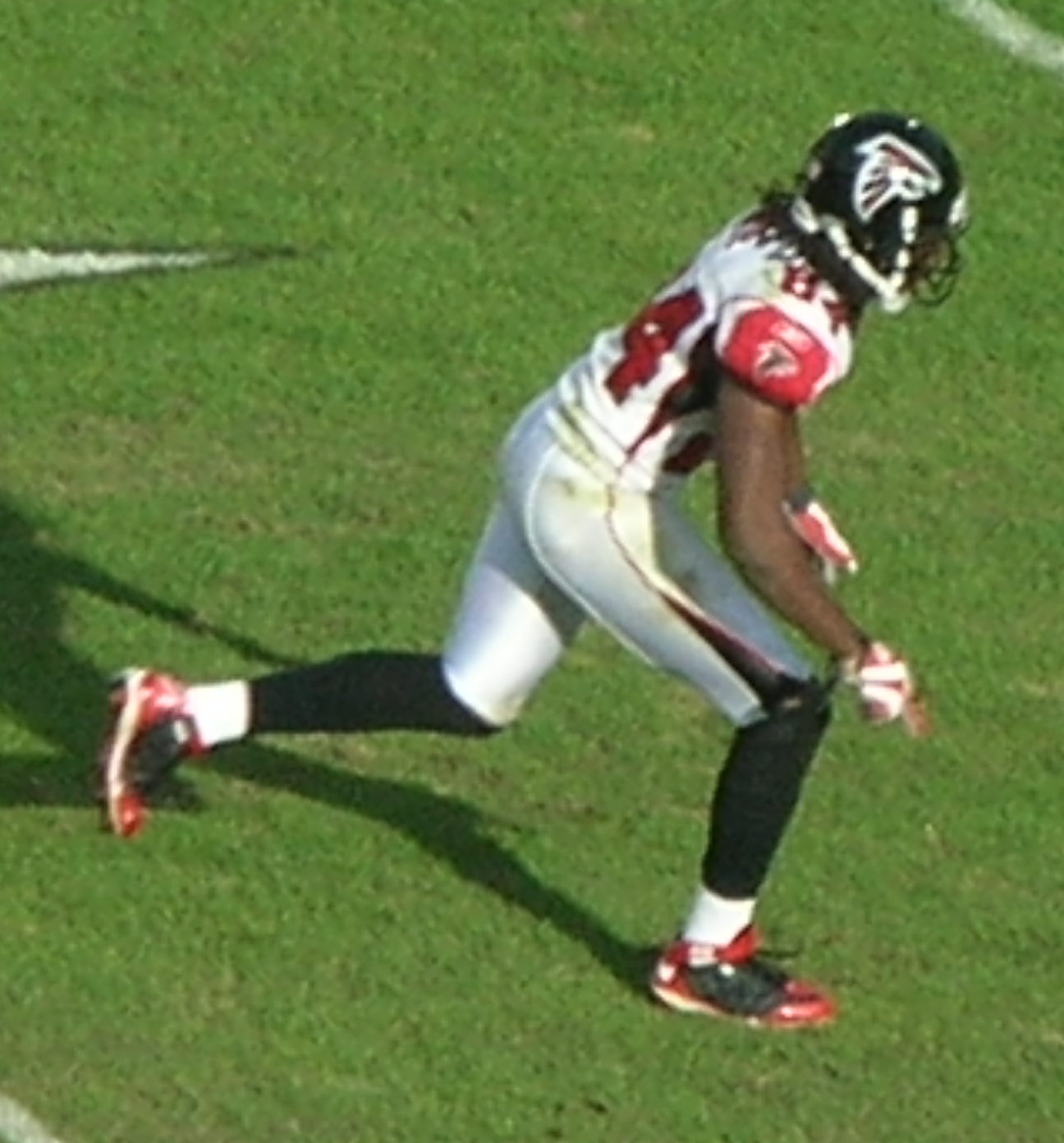
Roddy White was named to his first career Pro Bowl.

Michael Turner and Roddy White were named to the 2009 Pro Bowl NFC squad as reserves. It was his first trip to Hawaii. White and Turner are the 112th and 113th Pro Bowl selections in team history, they are the second Falcons RB and WR duo to be voted to the Pro Bowl in the same year (first since 1980). White is the fourth Falcons wide receiver to earn Pro Bowl accolades and the first since Terance Mathis in 1995. Turner is the eighth different Falcons runningback to earn Pro Bowl honors. Matt Ryan finished second amongst rookies in fan Pro Bowl voting, Ryan (416,468 votes) was the top rookie quarterback in the category but ranks behind Titans running back Chris Johnson (534,170 votes).
