= Pat McCoy =

Pat McCoy may refer to:

- Pat McCoy (American football) (born 1980), American football offensive tackle
- Pat McCoy (baseball) (born 1988), American baseball pitcher
- Pat Moran McCoy (born 1934), jazz pianist
- Pat McCoy (footballer), Ulster Footballer of the Year 1985–86
