= List of Limestone Saints head football coaches =

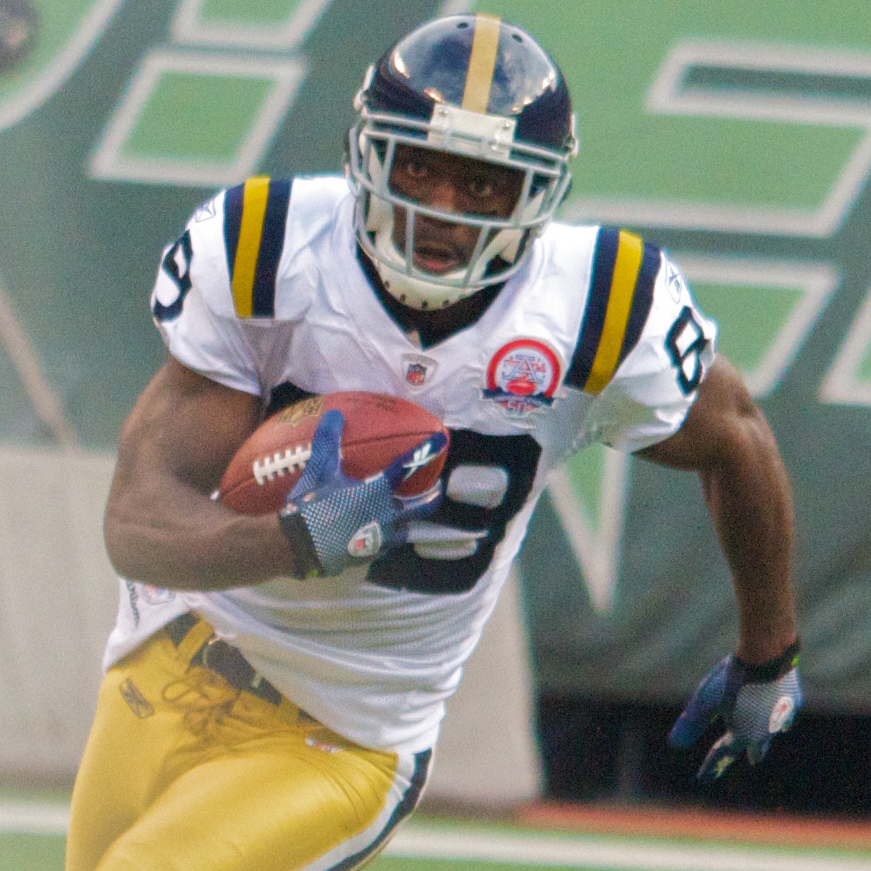
Jerricho Cotchery is the current head coach.

The Limestone Saints football team represented Limestone University in college football. The team competed at the NCAA Division II level as a member of the South Atlantic Conference (SAC). The program has had four head coaches since it began to play during the 2014 NCAA Division II football season. Since the start of the 2024 season, Jerricho Cotchery served as head coach of the Saints until the closure of Limestone University in May 2025.

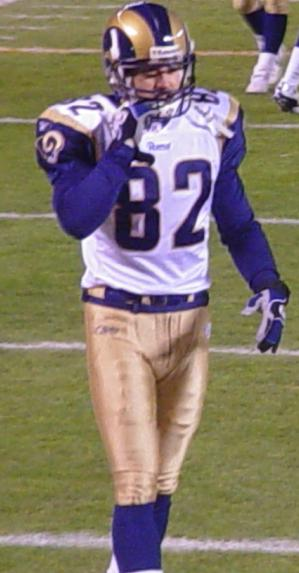
Mike Furrey was the head coach from 2016 to 2017 and from 2022 to 2023.

== Key ==
Key to symbols in coaches list
General		Overall		Conference		Postseason (Note: Although the first Rose Bowl Game was played in 1902, it has been continuously played since the 1916 game, and is recognized as the oldest bowl game by the NCAA. "—" indicates any season prior to 1916 when postseason games were not played.)	
No.	Order of coaches (Note: A running total of the number of head coaches, with coaches who served separate tenures being counted only once. Interim head coaches are represented with "Int" and are not counted in the running total. "—" indicates the team played but either without a coach or no coach is on record. "X" indicates an interim year without play.)	GC	Games coached	CW	Conference wins	PW	Postseason wins
DC	Division championships	OW	Overall wins	CL	Conference losses	PL	Postseason losses
CC	Conference championships	OL	Overall losses	CT	Conference ties	PT	Postseason ties
NC	National championships	OT	Overall ties (Note: Overtime rules in college football were introduced in 1996, making ties impossible in the period since.)	C%	Conference winning percentage		
†	Elected to the College Football Hall of Fame	O%	Overall winning percentage (Note: When computing the win–loss percentage, a tie counts as half a win and half a loss.)				

== Coaches ==
List of head football coaches showing season(s) coached, overall records, conference records, postseason records, championships and selected awards
No.	Name	Season(s)	GC	OW	OL	O%	CW	CL	C%	PW	PL	DC	CC	NC
1	Bobby James	2014–2015	21	4	17	0.190	–	–	–	–	–	–	–	–
2	Mike Furrey	2016–2017, 2022–2023	45	25	20	0.556	18	7	0.720	0	2	2 SAC Piedmont Division (2022–2023)	–	–
3	Tony Ierulli	2018	10	0	10	.000	0	7	.000	–	–	–	–	–
4	Brian Turk	2019–2021	24	4	20	0.167	4	15	0.211	–	–	–	–	–
5	Jerricho Cotchery	2024	11	8	3	0.727	7	2	0.778	–	–	–	–	–
