= Robert James =

Robert James may refer to:

- Robert James (actor) (1924–2004), Scottish actor
- Robert James (businessman) (died 1983), American founder of Raymond James Financial
- Robert James (defensive back) (born 1947), played in the National Football League, 1969–1974
- Robert James (headmaster) (1905–1982), headmaster of St Paul's School and of Harrow School
- Robert James (linebacker) (born 1983), drafted by the Atlanta Falcons, 2008
- Robert James (physician) (1703–1776), English physician
- Robert Brian James (died 1944), British Army officer
- Robert G. James (born 1946), United States District Court judge
- Robert L. James (1936–2021), American businessman
- Robert Rhodes James (1933–1999), British historian and Conservative member of parliament
- Robert S. James (1818–1850), father of the American outlaw Jesse James
- Robert C. James (1918–2004), American mathematician
- Robert James (MP for Berkshire) for Berkshire

== See also ==
- Robbie James (1957–1998), Welsh international footballer
- Rob James (disambiguation)
- Bob James (disambiguation)
- Bert James (disambiguation)
