= Bob James =

Bob or Bobby James may refer to:

- Bob James (commissioner) (1921–1987), American sports executive
- Bob James (sailor) (1933–2016), American sailor
- Bob James (musician) (born 1939), American jazz keyboardist, arranger and producer
- Bob James (baseball) (born 1958), former baseball player for the Expos, Tigers, and White Sox
- Bob James (rock singer) (1952–2021), American singer, frontman of Montrose, 1974–76
- Bob James, saxophonist and guitar player for British progressive rock band Skin Alley
- Bobby James (American football), American football coach
- "Bobby James", a song from the 2001 N.E.R.D. album In Search of...

== See also ==
- Robbie James (1957–1998), Welsh international footballer
- Robert James (disambiguation)
- Rob James (disambiguation)
