= Bert James (disambiguation) =

Bert James (1914–2006), Albert James, was an Australian politician.

Bert James may also refer to:

- Bert James (baseball) (1886–1959), American baseball player
- Bert James (footballer) (1923–1991), Australian footballer

== See also ==
- Robert James (disambiguation)
- Herbert James (disambiguation)
- Bertram James (disambiguation)
