= Jerious Norwood =

American gridiron football player (born 1983)

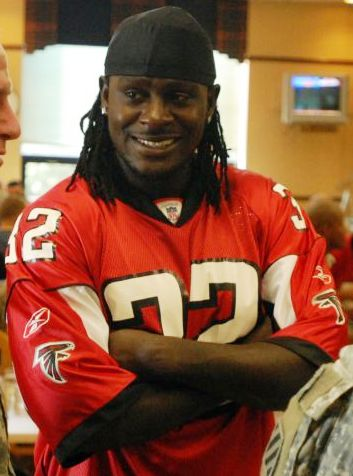
- Norwood in 2009

No. 32, 34
- Position: Running back / Kick returner

Personal information
- Born: July 29, 1983 (age 43); Brandon, Mississippi, U.S.
- Listed height: 5 ft 11 in (1.80 m)
- Listed weight: 205 lb (93 kg)

Career information
- High school: Brandon (MS)
- College: Mississippi State
- NFL draft: 2006: 3rd round, 79th overall pick

Career history
- Atlanta Falcons (2006–2010); St. Louis Rams (2011); Toronto Argonauts (2013)

Awards and highlights
- 2005 Conerly Trophy; Led NFL in Yards per Attempt (2007); 2× Second-team All-SEC (2004, 2005)

Career NFL statistics
- Rushing attempts: 399
- Rushing yards: 2,056
- Rushing touchdowns: 7
- Receptions: 96
- Receiving yards: 912
- Receiving touchdowns: 3
- Stats at Pro Football Reference
- Stats at CFL.ca (archive)

Jerious Montreal Norwood (born July 29, 1983) is an American former professional football player who was a running back in the National Football League (NFL). He played college football for the Mississippi State Bulldogs and is the school's second all-time leading rusher. He was selected by the Atlanta Falcons in the third round of the 2006 NFL draft.

== Early life ==
He played football and ran track at Brandon High School in Brandon, Mississippi where he was a high school All-American. He was also Mississippi's "Mr. Football", an honor given to the state's most outstanding high school football player. While at Brandon High he recorded 92 career touchdowns to rank fourth all-time on the state career-scoring list and accounted for more than 8,000 all-purpose yards. He totaled 3,229 all-purpose yards and 38 touchdowns during a junior season. Norwood was also named Mississippi's Gatorade Player of the Year as a senior as he rushed for 2,878 yards and scored 32 touchdowns. He also recorded nine receptions for 165 yards and three touchdowns, while averaging 46.9 yards on six kick returns with one touchdown. He also rushed for a school record 367 yards during a playoff game. In track & field, he competed as a sprinter and high hurdler. He got a PR of 14.5 seconds in the 110m hurdles, and 42.18 seconds as a member of the 4 × 100 m relay squad.

== College career ==
As a three-year starter, at Mississippi State, he rushed for over 100 yards on 13 occasions, surpassing the previous school record of 12 set by Walter Packer and James Johnson. He also started 29 of 46 games, setting a school record with 3,222 career rushing yards on 573 carries (5.6 avg.) with 15 touchdowns.

=== Freshman ===
In 2002, Norwood was named to the Knoxville News Sentinel Southeastern Conference All-Freshman team as a kick returner. He finished second on the team with 66 rushes for 394 yards (6.0 avg.). He also caught five passes for 47 yards and returned 14 kicks for 292 yards.

=== Sophomore ===
In 2003, Norwood appeared in every game with eight starts. He finished the season with 121 carries for 642 yards and two touchdowns.

=== Junior ===
In 2004, Norwood started every game as he became the sixth player in school history to rush for over 1,000 yards in a season, rushing for 1,050 yards on 195 carries with seven touchdowns. He recorded five games of 100-plus rushing yards, including one 200-yard performance.

=== Senior ===
As a senior in 2005, Norwood won the Conerly Award, which is given to the top college player in the state of Mississippi, after leading the team rushing with 191 carries for 1,136 yards (5.9 avg.) with six touchdowns and no fumbles. He ranked second on the team with 19 receptions for 96 yards and two touchdowns. Norwood also registered four punt returns for 43 yards. His 1,275 all-purpose yards on 214 plays rank eighth in school history.

== Professional career ==
Pre-draft measurables
Height	Weight	Arm length	Hand span	40-yard dash	10-yard split	20-yard split	20-yard shuttle	Three-cone drill	Vertical jump	Broad jump	Bench press
5 ft 11 5/8 in (1.82 m)	210 lb (95 kg)	31 1/4 in (0.79 m)	9 7/8 in (0.25 m)	4.40 s	1.55 s	2.62 s	4.25 s	6.81 s	36.5 in (0.93 m)	10 ft 2 in (3.10 m)	18 reps
All values from NFL Combine/Pro Day

=== Atlanta Falcons ===
==== 2006 ====
Norwood was selected by the Atlanta Falcons in the third round (79th overall) of the 2006 NFL draft.

In 2006, Norwood played in 14 games and ranked third on the team with 633 rushing yards on 99 carries (6.4 avg.) with two touchdowns to go along with 12 receptions for 102 yards. He also returned 13 kickoffs for 320 yards and tallied three special teams tackles.

Norwood was the first player in NFL history to have his first two career touchdown runs each go 70+ yards. His 78-yard touchdown run against Arizona in Week 4 marked the second longest in Falcons history behind running back Warrick Dunn's 90-yard touchdown carry the following week against the New York Giants.

He rushed 10 times for 66 yards in his NFL debut at the Carolina Panthers. He recorded his first career reception, for 12 yards, against the Tampa Bay Buccaneers along with nine carries for 45 yards with a long of 23 yards. In week 4 against the Arizona Cardinals, Norwood ran for 106 rushing yards on six carries (17.7 avg.), including a career-long and, a then team record long 78-yard touchdown run. That game, he and QB Mike Vick both ran for over 100 yards, which made the Falcons the only NFL team to ever record two games in a franchise's history where both the quarterback and a running back on the same team surpassed the 100-yard mark in the same game. (Vick and Warrick Dunn both eclipsed 100 yards in Week 2).

Later on in the season, Norwood recorded 64 rushing yards on eight carries against the Pittsburgh Steelers in along with one reception for five yards. He also recorded one kickoff return for 27 yards. Norwood recorded a career-high 107 yards on nine carries with one touchdown at the Washington Redskins. He ran the ball seven times for 32 yards and recorded one reception for four yards before leaving in the third quarter with an injury (knee) in Tampa Bay. Norwood recorded 63 rushing yards on 10 carries at the Philadelphia Eagles, along with three catches for 28 yards (9.3 avg.).

He finished sixth among all rookie running backs with 633 rushing yards on 99 carries and his 6.4 average yards per carry ranked second highest in the NFL, topped only by teammate QB Michael Vick (8.4 avg.).

==== 2007 ====
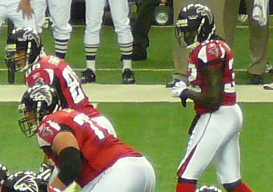
Norwood with Tyson Clabo and Jason Rader in 2009

In 15 regular season games, Norwood gained 613 yards on 103 carries, with an NFL-best 6.0 yards per carry for running backs, overall was surpassed in yards per carry only by quarterback Michael Vick, who had over an eight-yard average.

In 2007, Norwood started the season off by rushing five times for 33 yards, with two receptions for 24 yards at the Minnesota Vikings. During week two at the Jaguars, he ran the ball nine times for 30 yards, along with one reception for 13 yards. In the Falcons home opener, Norwood carried the ball six times for 32 yards, adding on three receptions for 34 yards. The next week against the Houston Texans. he rushed the ball nine times for 29 yards, along with two receptions for 16 yards. In the a game at the Tennessee Titans, Norwood carried the ball six times for 23 yards, while recording two receptions for four yards. In the next loss to, to the New York Giants, Norwood recorded his first offensive touchdown of the season, along with recording six rushes for 87 yards, one touchdown, while recording four receptions for 51 yards. During the Falcons week seven loss to the New Orleans Saints, he carried the ball six times for 38 yards, while adding three receptions for one yard. In a week nine win over the San Francisco 49ers, Norwood ran the ball six times for 39 yards. Norwood missed the Falcons week 10 rematch against the Panthers. In his return in week 11, he carried the ball twice for four yards, and recording two receptions for 10 yards against the Buccaneers. During a week 12 loss to the Indianapolis Colts, Norwood rushed the ball six times for 33 yards and recorded one reception for nine yards. In week 13 against the St. Louis Rams, he carried the ball eight times for 94 yards, while recording three receptions for 21 yards. During a week 14 rematch with the Saints, Norwood carried the ball six times for 21 yards, along with recording two receptions for 57 yards. In the week 15 rematch with Tampa Bay he carried the ball nine times for 73 yards. In a week 16 match up against the Arizona Cardinals, Norwood rushed the ball eight times for 31 yards, along with one receptions for -4 yards. In the 2007 season finale against the Seattle Seahawks, he ran the ball a season high 11 times for 46 yards, along with two receptions for 41 yards.

=== St. Louis Rams ===
Norwood signed with the St. Louis Rams on August 2, 2011.

=== Toronto Argonauts ===
On Wednesday August 14, 2013, Norwood was signed to the practice roster of the Toronto Argonauts of the Canadian Football League He drew his first CFL start in a September 21 game against the Calgary Stampeders rushing for 68 yards on 10 carries and catching 4 passes for 67 yards. He had his first 100-yard rushing day against the Montreal Alouettes rushing for 108 yards on 8 carries. He finished the season with 342 rushing yards, 234 receiving yards, and 113 kickoff return yards. On May 28, 2014, Norwood was released by the Argonauts.

== NFL career statistics ==
	Led the league
Legend
**Bold**	Career high

=== Regular season ===
Year	Team	Games		Rushing					Receiving				
Year	Team	GP	GS	Att	Yds	Avg	Lng	TD	Rec	Yds	Avg	Lng	TD
2006	ATL	14	0	99	**633**	**6.4**	**78**	2	12	102	8.5	32	0
2007	ATL	15	2	**103**	613	6.0	67	1	28	277	**9.9**	46	0
2008	ATL	**16**	0	95	489	5.1	45	**4**	**36**	**338**	9.4	**67**	**2**
2009	ATL	10	**4**	76	252	3.3	21	0	19	186	9.8	38	1
2010	ATL	2	0	2	8	4.0	6	0	1	9	9.0	9	0
2011	STL	9	0	24	61	2.5	10	0	0	0	0.0	0	0
Career		66	6	399	2,056	5.2	78	7	96	912	9.5	67	3

=== Playoffs ===
Year	Team	Games		Rushing					Receiving				
Year	Team	GP	GS	Att	Yds	Avg	Lng	TD	Rec	Yds	Avg	Lng	TD
2008	ATL	**1**	0	**2**	**12**	**6.0**	**8**	0	**1**	**28**	**28.0**	**28**	0
Career		1	0	2	12	6.0	8	0	1	28	28.0	28	0

== Personal life ==
Norwood has a daughter named Ja'Nyla Norwood.
