= Rob James =

Rob James may refer to:

- Rob James (singer) (born 1977), Canadian pop singer
- Rob James (guitarist), member of The Clarks

== See also ==
- Rob James-Collier (born 1976), British actor and model
- Robbie James (1957–1998), Welsh international footballer
- Robert James (disambiguation)
- Bob James (disambiguation)
