= Mickey Pimentel =

American football player (born 1985)

No. 51, 52
- Position: Linebacker

Personal information
- Born: March 29, 1985 (age 41); San Diego, California, U.S.
- Listed height: 6 ft 2 in (1.88 m)
- Listed weight: 238 lb (108 kg)

Career information
- College: California
- NFL draft: 2007: undrafted

Career history
- Carolina Panthers (2007)*; Kansas City Chiefs (2007); Atlanta Falcons (2008)*
- * Offseason or practice squad member only

Mickey Pimentel (born March 29, 1985) is an American former football linebacker. He was signed by the Carolina Panthers as an undrafted free agent in 2007. He played college football at California.

Pimentel was also a member of the Kansas City Chiefs and Atlanta Falcons.

== Early life ==
Pimentel attended Marian Catholic High School in San Diego, California and was a student and a letterman in football and basketball. In football, as a senior, he led his team to the League Championship and was named the South Bay League's Defensive Player of the Year. In basketball, as a senior, he was named the South Bay League Player of the Year.

== Professional career ==
=== Carolina Panthers ===
Pimentel signed a free agent contract with the National Football League Carolina Panthers in May, 2007. He was waived on September 1, 2007.

=== Kansas City Chiefs ===
Pimentel remained unsigned until December 12, when he was signed to the practice squad of the Kansas City Chiefs. He was waived by the team on May 7, 2008.

=== Atlanta Falcons ===
On August 6, 2008, Pimentel was signed by the Atlanta Falcons a day after linebacker Robert James was waived/injured.
