= Chevis Jackson =

American football player and coach (born 1985)

Wake Forest Demon Deacons
- Title: Defensive backs coach

Personal information
- Born: December 11, 1985 (age 40); Mobile, Alabama, U.S.
- Listed height: 5 ft 11 in (1.80 m)
- Listed weight: 194 lb (88 kg)

Career information
- High school: St. Paul's Episcopal School (Mobile)
- College: LSU
- NFL draft: 2008: 3rd round, 68th overall pick

Career history

Playing
- Atlanta Falcons (2008–2009); Jacksonville Jaguars (2010); New England Patriots (2010); Denver Broncos (2010); Carolina Panthers (2011)*
- * Offseason or practice squad member only

Coaching
- South Alabama (2013–2014) Graduate assistant; LSU (2015) Graduate assistant; Ball State (2016–2018) Defensive backs coach; Kansas (2019–2021) Defensive backs coach; Marshall (2022–2023) Defensive backs coach; Miami (2024) Cornerbacks coach; Wake Forest (2025–present) Defensive backs coach

Awards and highlights
- BCS national champion (2007); First-team All-SEC (2007)

Career NFL statistics
- Tackles: 60
- Forced fumbles: 1
- Fumble recoveries: 1
- Pass deflections: 7
- Interceptions: 1
- Total touchdowns: 1
- Stats at Pro Football Reference

Chevis Dauro Jackson (born December 11, 1985) is an American football coach and former player who currently serves as defensive backs coach for the Wake Forest football team. Jackson played professionally in the National Football League (NFL) for the Atlanta Falcons, Jacksonville Jaguars, New England Patriots, and Denver Broncos. He played college football at Louisiana State University, where he was part of the 2007 national championship team and was a first-team All-Southeastern Conference selection.

== Early life ==
While attending St. Paul's Episcopal School in Mobile, Alabama, Jackson played wide receiver, cornerback, and return specialist. Jackson recorded 40 tackles and seven interceptions on defense in 2003 as a senior, and also caught 31 passes for 660 yards and five touchdowns at receiver. He returned 16 kickoffs for 415 yards and 13 punts for 80 yards as a junior and made 45 catches for 850 yards and nine touchdowns.

== College career ==
=== Freshman season (2004) ===
Following high school, Jackson attended Louisiana State University. Jackson played in all 12 games as a true freshman as a defensive back for the Tigers in 2004. He finished the season with five tackles and three pass break-ups in nickel and dime packages. While subbing in for an injured Corey Webster, Jackson recorded two tackles and a pass break-up against Florida.

=== Sophomore season (2005) ===
In his sophomore season in 2005, Jackson started at cornerback and ranked in the top ten in the nation in five statistical categories. While starting all 12 games on the season, Jackson recorded 47 tackles, an interception and three pass break-ups. He also tallied 3.5 tackles for a loss, one forced fumble and recovered a fumble. In a victory over Florida, Jackson recorded a career-best seven tackles. He then added 6 tackles, one tackle for a loss, and a forced fumble in the win over Appalachian State.

=== Junior season (2006) ===
Jackson, as a junior, started all 13 games of the 2006 season. He finished the season with 46 tackles, two interceptions, and a team-high 14 pass break-ups. Jackson was key on the Tigers' defense that ranked third in the nation in pass efficiency defense. He also returned 15 kicks for a 6.7 yard average. Jackson's pass break-up totals ranked second in the SEC. In the victory over Arkansas, Jackson recorded a career-high seven tackles. Against Florida, Jackson recorded four tackles, an interception and a pass break-up. He then recorded three tackles, broke up three passes, and grabbed an interception in a win over Alabama. In the 2007 Sugar Bowl against Notre Dame, Jackson led the Tigers with six tackles. Jackson finished his junior season ranked eighth on the all-time school list for passes defended with 23.

=== Senior season (2007) ===
Jackson opened his senior 2007 season with two tackles and two pass break-ups against Mississippi State. Against Middle Tennessee State, Jackson recorded three tackles. In the 28–16 victory over South Carolina, he recorded four tackles, an interception, and three pass break-ups. In the 34–9 win over Tulane, Jackson tallied three tackles and an interception. In the 28–24 victory over Florida, he recorded four tackles and a pass defensed. In the Tigers' 37–43 loss to Kentucky, Jackson recorded two tackles and an interception. In their 30–24 win over Auburn, Jackson recorded five tackles and three pass break-ups. In their victory over Alabama, Jackson totaled one tackle, one interception, and four pass defenses. Against Mississippi, he recorded four tackles and two pass break-ups. In the 21–14 victory over Tennessee in the SEC Championship, Jackson totaled six tackles and two pass break-ups. In the BCS National Championship victory over Ohio State, Jackson recorded two tackles and grabbed an interception that he returned 34 yards.

Jackson finished his senior season with 42 tackles and 5 interceptions. Jackson also earned first-team All-SEC honors at defensive back.

== Professional career ==
=== Pre-draft ===
Upon graduating from LSU in 2007, Jackson entered the 2008 NFL draft. Jackson was then invited to the NFL Combine.

Pre-draft measurables
Height	Weight	40-yard dash	20-yard shuttle	Three-cone drill	Vertical jump	Broad jump	Bench press
6 ft 0 in (1.83 m)	192 lb (87 kg)	4.52 s	4.15 s	6.96 s	36 in (0.91 m)	10 ft 5 in (3.18 m)	13 reps
All values from NFL Combine.

=== Atlanta Falcons ===
Jackson was selected by the Atlanta Falcons in the third round (68th overall) of the 2008 NFL draft. He returned his first career interception for a 95-yard touchdown on November 9, 2008, in a Week 9 meeting against the division rival New Orleans Saints. His return became the second-longest in Falcons history behind a 101-yard interception return by Tom Pridemore against the San Francisco 49ers on September 20, 1981. Jackson finished the 2008 regular season with 31 tackles and five passes defensed in 16 games played (one start). He recorded his second interception on January 3, 2009, in a playoff game against the Arizona Cardinals.

In 2009, Jackson played in 15 games, starting two, and finished with 29 tackles, two passes defensed, and one forced fumble.

On September 4, 2010, Jackson was released by the Falcons during their final cuts.

=== Jacksonville Jaguars ===
Jackson signed with the Jacksonville Jaguars on October 18, 2010. He was waived on November 17, 2010, after playing in two games as a reserve.

=== New England Patriots ===
The New England Patriots signed Jackson on December 10, 2010. He was waived on December 18, 2010.

=== Denver Broncos ===
The Denver Broncos claimed Jackson on December 20, 2010. He was waived on August 4, 2011.

=== Carolina Panthers ===
On August 6, 2011, Jackson was claimed off waivers by the Carolina Panthers. On September 3, 2011, he was released by the Panthers.

== Coaching career ==
=== Early coaching career ===
In 2016, he became the defensive backs coach for the Ball State Cardinals football team. In 2017 he received an award as the top recruiter in the Mid-American Conference. Starting in the 2019 football season, he joined head coach Les Miles at Kansas, where and served as the defensive backs coach. In 2021, Jackson was retained in the same role at Kansas when Lance Leipold was named the new head coach to replace Les Miles. He was let go following the 2021 season.

=== Marshall ===
He was hired by Marshall for the 2022 season as the defensive backs coach.
