= Herbert James (disambiguation) =

Herbert James (1888–1958) was an English recipient of the Victoria Cross.

Herbert James may also refer to:

- Herbert Armitage James (1844–1931), Welsh cleric and headmaster

== See also ==
- Bert James (disambiguation)
