= Chauncey Davis =

American football player (born 1983)

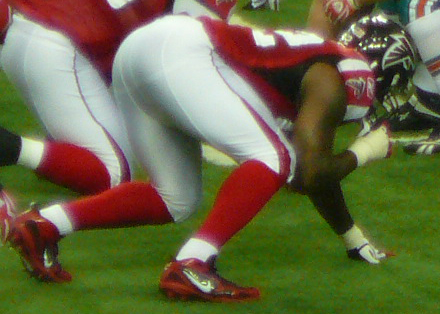
- Davis with the Atlanta Falcons in 2009

No. 92, 94
- Position: Defensive end

Personal information
- Born: January 27, 1983 (age 43); Bartow, Florida, U.S.
- Listed height: 6 ft 2 in (1.88 m)
- Listed weight: 274 lb (124 kg)

Career information
- High school: Auburndale (FL)
- College: Florida State
- NFL draft: 2005: 4th round, 128th overall pick

Career history
- Atlanta Falcons (2005–2010); Chicago Bears (2011)

Awards and highlights
- Second-team All-ACC (2004)

Career NFL statistics
- Total tackles: 191
- Sacks: 11
- Forced fumbles: 2
- Stats at Pro Football Reference

Chauncey Antoine Davis (born January 27, 1983) is an American former professional football player who was a defensive end in the National Football League (NFL). He played college football for the Florida State Seminoles and was selected by the Atlanta Falcons in the fourth round of the 2005 NFL draft. He also played for the Chicago Bears.

== Early life ==
Davis was born in Bartow, Florida, but raised in Auburndale by Glenda Davis. According to a DNA analysis, his ancestries are, mainly, Temne and Mende people of Sierra Leone. He was First-team All-State Class 4A and All-America selection as a senior at Auburndale High School, rushing for 1,000 yards in addition to playing linebacker and defensive end.

== College career ==
Davis totaled 40 tackles, seven sacks, two forced fumbles, one fumble recovery, and one blocked kick in 24 games for Florida State. Converted to defensive end as a senior from the outside linebacker position. He was named the team’s most improved defensive end and outstanding player as a senior after posting 22 tackles, five sacks, one forced fumble and one fumble recovery in 11 starts. He also attended Jones County Junior College.

== Professional career ==
=== Atlanta Falcons ===
Davis was selected in the fourth round of the 2005 NFL draft by the Atlanta Falcons with the 128th overall pick. After spending six seasons with the team, he was released on September 2, 2011.

=== Chicago Bears ===
The Chicago Bears signed Davis on November 14, 2011. He was waived by the team on August 31, 2012.

== NFL career statistics ==
Legend
**Bold**	Career high

=== Regular season ===
Year	Team	Games		Tackles					Interceptions					Fumbles			
Year	Team	GP	GS	Cmb	Solo	Ast	Sck	TFL	Int	Yds	TD	Lng	PD	FF	FR	Yds	TD
2005	ATL	**16**	5	28	21	7	1.0	4	0	0	0	0	0	0	2	**24**	**1**
2006	ATL	**16**	**13**	38	29	**9**	1.0	3	**1**	**41**	0	**41**	**2**	0	1	0	0
2007	ATL	**16**	0	31	27	4	2.0	7	0	0	0	0	0	0	1	0	0
2008	ATL	**16**	1	**39**	**30**	**9**	**4.0**	**9**	0	0	0	0	1	**1**	**3**	1	0
2009	ATL	**16**	4	22	16	6	1.0	4	0	0	0	0	1	**1**	0	0	0
2010	ATL	**16**	2	24	19	5	1.0	7	**1**	26	**1**	26	**2**	0	1	0	0
2011	CHI	6	0	9	8	1	1.0	2	0	0	0	0	0	0	0	0	0
		102	25	191	150	41	11.0	36	2	67	1	41	6	2	8	25	1

=== Playoffs ===
Year	Team	Games		Tackles					Interceptions					Fumbles			
Year	Team	GP	GS	Cmb	Solo	Ast	Sck	TFL	Int	Yds	TD	Lng	PD	FF	FR	Yds	TD
2008	ATL	**1**	**1**	**4**	**3**	**1**	0.0	**2**	0	0	0	0	0	0	0	0	0
2010	ATL	**1**	0	0	0	0	0.0	0	0	0	0	0	0	0	0	0	0
		2	1	4	3	1	0.0	2	0	0	0	0	0	0	0	0	0
