= Thomas DeCoud =

American football player (born 1985)

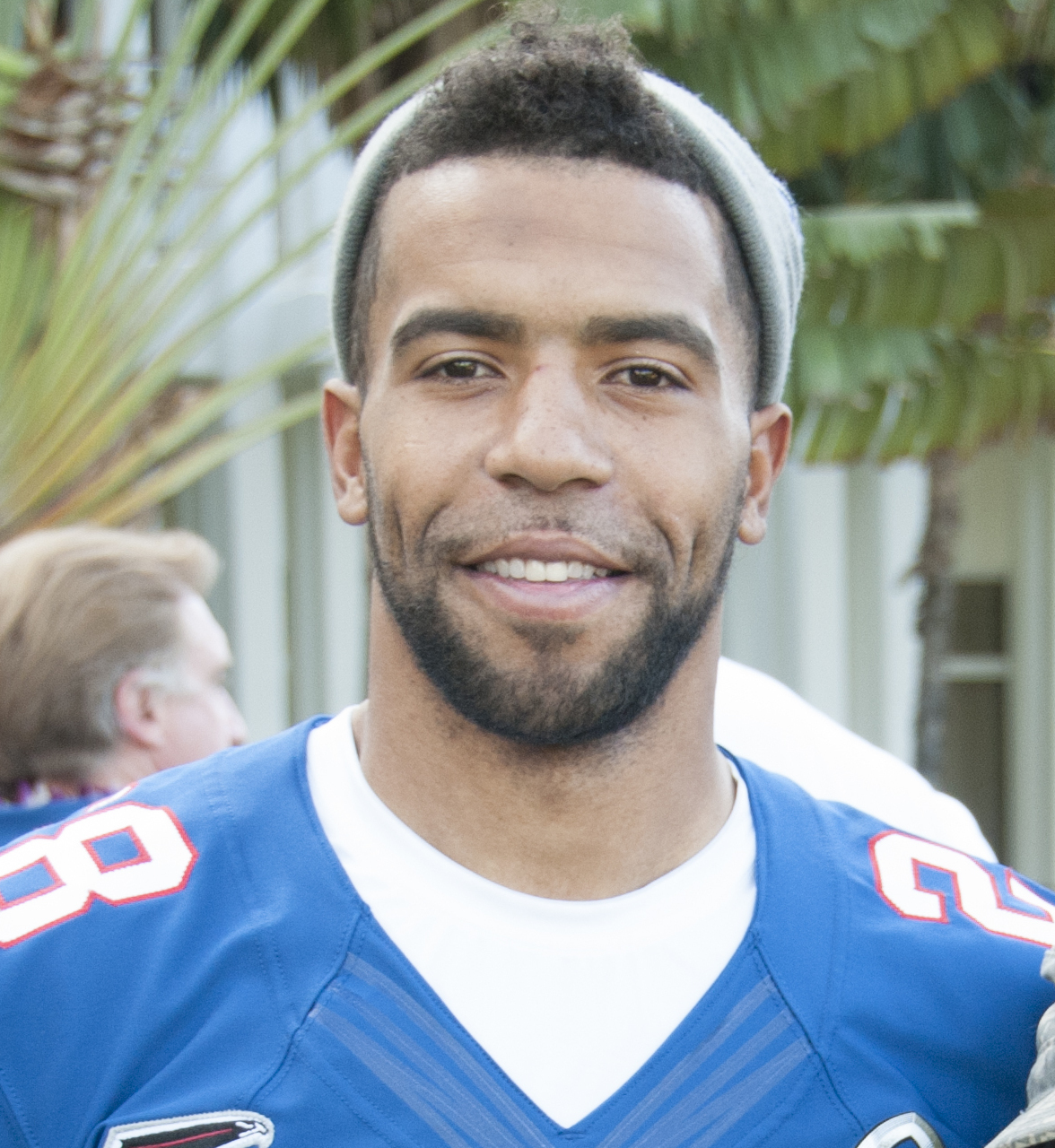
- DeCoud in 2013

No. 21, 28
- Position: Safety

Personal information
- Born: March 19, 1985 (age 41); Oakland, California, U.S.
- Listed height: 6 ft 1 in (1.85 m)
- Listed weight: 196 lb (89 kg)

Career information
- High school: Pinole Valley (Pinole, California)
- College: California
- NFL draft: 2008: 3rd round, 98th overall pick

Career history
- Atlanta Falcons (2008–2013); Carolina Panthers (2014)

Awards and highlights
- Pro Bowl (2012)

Career NFL statistics
- Total tackles: 425
- Sacks: 3
- Forced fumbles: 4
- Fumble recoveries: 3
- Interceptions: 15
- Defensive touchdowns: 1
- Stats at Pro Football Reference

Thomas Levon DeCoud (/deɪˈkuː/ day-KOO; born March 19, 1985) is an American former professional football player who was a safety in the National Football League (NFL) for seven seasons, primarily with the Atlanta Falcons. He played college football for the California Golden Bears. He was selected by the Falcons in the third round of the 2008 NFL draft. He also briefly played for the Carolina Panthers.

== Early life ==
DeCoud attended Glencove Elementary School and Hogan Senior High School in Vallejo, California, then attended Pinole Valley High School in Pinole, California and was a letterman in football and basketball. In football, as a senior, he was an All-ACCAL selection. In basketball, he was an All-ACCAL selection. DeCoud graduated from Pinole High School in 2003.

== Professional career ==
=== Atlanta Falcons ===
DeCoud was selected with the 98th overall pick by the Atlanta Falcons in the third round of the 2008 NFL draft.

Playing primarily on special teams in 10 games as a rookie, DeCoud recorded 6 tackles (5 solo). He had a breakout season the next year as he started all 16 games at free safety and compiled 68 tackles (57 solo), 2 sacks, 2 forced fumbles, 7 pass deflections and 3 interceptions. After the season, DeCoud received recognition from USA Today, which listed him on its annual "All-Joe" team.

In a SportsCenter interview on September 27, 2012, Decoud played the "Meow Game" from the movie Super Troopers.

Decoud was released from the Falcons on March 11, 2014.

=== Carolina Panthers ===
The Carolina Panthers signed DeCoud to a two-year deal on April 10, 2014. DeCoud made his first start for the Panthers in a 20-14 victory against the Tampa Bay Buccaneers in week 1. During the home opener in a 24-7 win against the Detroit Lions in week 2, DeCoud recorded 3 tackles and was responsible for a pass deflection deep downfield against Calvin Johnson which led to an interception by Melvin White. During the Panthers week 5 victory over the Chicago Bears, DeCoud recorded his first interception for the Panthers against Jay Cutler to go along with 4 tackles and a pass deflection. He was released on February 17, 2015.

== NFL career statistics ==
Legend
	Led the league
**Bold**	Career high

=== Regular season ===
Year	Team	Games		Tackles					Interceptions					Fumbles			
Year	Team	GP	GS	Cmb	Solo	Ast	Sck	TFL	Int	Yds	TD	Lng	PD	FF	FR	Yds	TD
2008	ATL	10	0	6	5	1	0.0	0	0	0	0	0	0	0	0	0	0
2009	ATL	**16**	**16**	68	57	11	**2.0**	3	3	25	0	15	7	**2**	**1**	0	0
2010	ATL	**16**	**16**	75	57	18	0.0	0	1	0	0	0	4	**2**	0	0	0
2011	ATL	**16**	15	**86**	**67**	19	0.0	2	4	**77**	0	**49**	6	0	0	0	0
2012	ATL	**16**	**16**	76	62	14	1.0	**4**	**6**	42	0	24	**9**	0	**1**	0	0
2013	ATL	15	15	65	44	**21**	0.0	1	0	0	0	0	2	0	**1**	**30**	**1**
2014	CAR	15	11	49	34	15	0.0	0	1	35	0	35	3	0	0	0	0
		104	89	425	326	99	3.0	10	15	179	0	49	31	4	3	30	1

=== Playoffs ===
Year	Team	Games		Tackles					Interceptions					Fumbles			
Year	Team	GP	GS	Cmb	Solo	Ast	Sck	TFL	Int	Yds	TD	Lng	PD	FF	FR	Yds	TD
2008	ATL	1	0	3	3	0	0.0	0	0	0	0	0	0	0	0	0	0
2010	ATL	1	1	4	3	1	0.0	0	0	0	0	0	0	0	0	0	0
2011	ATL	1	1	9	**7**	2	0.0	**2**	0	0	0	0	0	0	0	0	0
2012	ATL	**2**	**2**	**11**	**7**	**4**	0.0	0	0	0	0	0	**2**	0	0	0	0
2014	CAR	1	0	0	0	0	0.0	0	0	0	0	0	0	0	0	0	0
		6	4	27	20	7	0.0	2	0	0	0	0	2	0	0	0	0

== Personal life ==
DeCoud last coached football at California High School.
