= Bertram James (disambiguation) =

Bertram James was a survivor of The Great Escape.

Berrtram James may also refer to:

- Bertram James (screenwriter)

== See also ==
- Bert James (disambiguation)
