= Bert James (footballer) =

Australian rules footballer

Personal information
- Full name: Albert Thomas James
- Born: 5 June 1923; Bendigo, Victoria
- Died: 4 December 1992 (aged 69); Mount Gambier, South Australia
- Height: 188 cm (6 ft 2 in)
- Weight: 86 kg (190 lb)

Playing career^{1}
Years	Club	Games (Goals)
1947	Richmond	3 (0)
- ^{1} Playing statistics correct to the end of 1947.

Albert Thomas James (5 June 1923 – 4 December 1992) was an Australian rules footballer who played for the Richmond Football Club in the Victorian Football League (VFL).
