= George Cooper (tight end) =

American football player (born 1984)

No. 48
- Position: Tight end

Personal information
- Born: March 19, 1984 (age 42); Westerville, Ohio, U.S.
- Listed height: 6 ft 5 in (1.96 m)
- Listed weight: 266 lb (121 kg)

Career information
- High school: Westerville (OH) North
- College: Georgia Tech
- NFL draft: 2007: undrafted

Career history
- Detroit Lions (2007)*; Atlanta Falcons (2007–2008)*
- * Offseason or practice squad member only

George Fitzgerald Cooper (born March 19, 1984) is an American former football tight end. He was signed by the Detroit Lions as an undrafted free agent in 2007. He played college football at Georgia Tech.

Cooper was also a member of the Atlanta Falcons.

== Early life ==
Cooper played high school football at Westerville North High School under former head coach Bob Cavin. He was a second-team all-state performer at Westerville North and was ranked as high as the No. 11 among the nation's tight end prospects.

== College career ==
Cooper played tight end under Chan Gailey for the Georgia Tech Yellow Jackets. He had nine receptions for 113 yards and one touchdown in three seasons at Georgia Tech.

== Professional career ==
=== Detroit Lions ===
Cooper was originally signed by the Detroit Lions as an undrafted free agent on May 4, 2007. He was waived by the team on June 14.

=== Atlanta Falcons ===
On September 3, 2007, Cooper was signed to the practice squad of the Atlanta Falcons, where he spent the entire season. On February 7, 2008, Cooper was re-signed to a future contract. He was waived on June 10, re-signed on August 4 and waived again on August 24 when the team signed veteran tight end Marcus Pollard.

=== Kenyon College ===
In Fall 2015 Cooper interned at Kenyon College though the National Football League Players Association’s (NFLPA) Coaching Internship program. Westerville, where Cooper played high school football, is 38 miles southwest of Kenyon.
