= Brandon Miller (American football) =

American football player (born 1986)

No. 90
- Position: Defensive end

Personal information
- Born: January 21, 1986 (age 40); Colquitt, Georgia, U.S.
- Listed height: 6 ft 4 in (1.93 m)
- Listed weight: 259 lb (117 kg)

Career information
- College: Georgia
- NFL draft: 2008: undrafted

Career history
- Atlanta Falcons (2008); Seattle Seahawks (2008–2009)

Career NFL statistics
- Tackles: 2
- Stats at Pro Football Reference

Brandon Gerrod Miller (born January 21, 1986) is an American former professional football player who was a defensive end in the National Football League (NFL). He was signed by the Atlanta Falcons as an undrafted free agent in 2008. He played college football for the Georgia Bulldogs.

He also played for the Seattle Seahawks.

== Early life ==
Attended Miller County High School and as a senior he made 106 tackles and 27 receptions for more than 500 yards. He was named All-State, and All-South and was named SuperPrep Elite 50, All-America, and All-Dixie Teams.

== College career ==
Miller played in 37 career games with 15 starts at linebacker for Georgia, posting 73 tackles and 6.0 sacks in his Bulldog career. In 2007, he appeared in 11 games making seven starts and in 2006 he appeared in every game with five starts and made 23 tackles with 2 PBU and 3 QB-Pressures. In 2005, he made his first career start against Boise State in the 2005 opener and started 10 games during season despite being hampered by injuries The prior season, 2004, he played in all 12 games with nine tackles and one fumble recovery.

== Professional career ==
=== Atlanta Falcons ===
He was signed by the Atlanta Falcons as an undrafted free agent in 2008. He spent the first 10 weeks of the regular season on the team's practice squad before being promoted to the active roster on November 16. He was waived two days later.

=== Seattle Seahawks ===
Miller was claimed off waivers by the Seattle Seahawks on November 19, 2008. He appeared in one game for the Seahawks during the 2008 season, recording one tackle.

Miller was waived/injured by the Seahawks on July 29 and subsequently reverted to the team's injured reserve list. On May 13, 2010, Miller was released by the Seahawks.
