= Keith Zinger =

German-born gridiron football player (born 1984)

No. 89
- Position: Tight end

Personal information
- Born: October 9, 1984 (age 42); Heidelberg, West Germany
- Listed height: 6 ft 4 in (1.93 m)
- Listed weight: 250 lb (113 kg)

Career information
- High school: Leesville (Leesville, Louisiana, U.S.)
- College: LSU
- NFL draft: 2008: 7th round, 232nd overall pick

Career history
- Atlanta Falcons (2008–2010); New York Jets (2011)*
- * Offseason or practice squad member only

Awards and highlights
- 2× BCS national champion (2003, 2007); Freshman All-SEC (2003)

Career NFL statistics
- Receptions: 1
- Receiving yards: 7
- Stats at Pro Football Reference

Keith Jackson Zinger (born October 9, 1984) is a former American football tight end. He was selected by the Atlanta Falcons in the seventh round of the 2008 NFL draft. He played college football at Louisiana State. He was a member of both LSU’s national championship teams in 2003 and 2007.

== Early life ==
Zinger attended to Leesville High School and was ranked as the nation’s No. 13 tight end in the country by Rivals.com. He also was named an Atlanta Journal-Constitution Super Southern 100, Baton Rouge Advocate Second Dozen and the New Orleans Times-Picayune Top 25 Blue-Chip list. Zinger also was a first-team 4A all-state selection and in his senior season, he had 322 yards on 23 receptions for two touchdowns.

== College career ==
Zinger played in 13 games in his freshman season at LSU, caught three passes for 31 yards and was named Freshmen All-SEC squad by the league's coaches. He was member of the team that won the BCS National Championship in the 2004 Sugar Bowl, by beating the Oklahoma Sooners 21-14.

In 2005, Zinger scored his first career touchdown on a nine-yard reception from JaMarcus Russell in a game against Appalachian State. In 2007, during his senior season, he played in 14 games and caught three passes for 51 yards averaging 17.0) and a long reception of 27 yards. He also had a career-long 27-yard reception against the Tennessee Volunteers in the 2007 SEC Championship Game. to help the tigers reach the 2008 BCS National Championship Game to defeat the Ohio State Buckeyes.

== Professional career ==
Zinger was selected by the Atlanta Falcons in the seventh round of the 2008 NFL draft (232nd overall). He signed to a four-year contract. He was released on the final cuts but was added to the practice squad and spent the entire season there.

Zinger was signed by the New York Jets on August 7, 2011. He was waived September 2.

== Family ==
He is son of Randy and Michele Zinger. He is married to the former Ashley McKenzie. He has four siblings; Clinton, Gareth, Priscilla, and Biancia.
