= Willie Evans (defensive end) =

American football player (born 1984)

No. 32, 78
- Position: Defensive end

Personal information
- Born: March 5, 1984 (age 42); Waynesboro, Mississippi, U.S.
- Listed height: 6 ft 1 in (1.85 m)
- Listed weight: 260 lb (118 kg)

Career information
- High school: Wayne County (Waynesboro)
- College: Mississippi State
- NFL draft: 2006: undrafted

Career history
- New York Giants (2006)*; New Orleans Saints (2007)*; Carolina Panthers (2007)*; Atlanta Falcons (2008–2009)*; Saskatchewan Roughriders (2009)*; Philadelphia Soul (2011); Kansas City Command (2011)
- * Offseason or practice squad member only

Awards and highlights
- Third-team All-American (2005); First-team All-SEC (2005); Second-team All-SEC (2004)

Career AFL statistics
- Total tackles: 8
- Sacks: 1
- Stats at ArenaFan.com

Willie Deloyd Evans (born March 5, 1984) is an American former professional football player who played defensive end and last played for the Kansas City Command. He played college football for the Mississippi State Bulldogs.

== College career ==
He attended Mississippi State University, where he logged 24.5 sacks, which is third on MSU's all-time leaderboard. In 2005, he registered 15.0 sacks, which is second-best in school history.

== Professional career ==
He was signed by the New York Giants as an undrafted free agent in 2006.

Evans was also a member of the New Orleans Saints, Carolina Panthers, Atlanta Falcons, Saskatchewan Roughriders, Philadelphia Soul, and Kansas City Command.
