= Eric Brock (safety) =

American football player and coach (born 1985)

No. 42
- Position: Safety

Personal information
- Born: April 24, 1985 (age 41); Alexander City, Alabama, U.S.
- Listed height: 6 ft 0 in (1.83 m)
- Listed weight: 207 lb (94 kg)

Career information
- College: Auburn
- NFL draft: 2008: undrafted

Career history

Playing
- Atlanta Falcons (2008–2009)

Coaching
- West Virginia Wesleyan (2011) (Assistant); West Virginia Wesleyan (2012–present) (Defensive coordinator)

Career NFL statistics
- Games played: 3
- Tackles: 1
- Interceptions: 0
- Stats at Pro Football Reference

Eric Brock (born April 4, 1985) is an American former professional football player who was a safety for two seasons with the Atlanta Falcons of the National Football League (NFL). After playing college football for the Auburn Tigers, he was signed by the Falcons as an undrafted free agent in 2008.

== Professional career ==
Brock was promoted to the Atlanta Falcons' active roster on December 22, 2009, after safety Antoine Harris was placed on injured reserve. Brock was waived on February 9, 2010. Brock re-signed with the team on August 17, 2010, but was released prior to the 2010 season on September 4, 2010.

== Coaching career ==
Brock became an assistant coach for the West Virginia Wesleyan College football team in July 2011. He was promoted to defensive coordinator on January 22, 2012.
