= Von Hutchins =

American football player (born 1981)

Profile
- Position: General manager

Personal information
- Born: February 14, 1981 (age 45); Natchez, Mississippi, U.S.
- Listed height: 5 ft 10 in (1.78 m)
- Listed weight: 180 lb (82 kg)

Career information
- High school: Cathedral (MS)
- College: Mississippi
- NFL draft: 2004: 6th round, 173rd overall pick

Career history

Playing
- Indianapolis Colts (2004–2005); Houston Texans (2006–2007); Atlanta Falcons (2008)

Operations
- Green Bay Packers (2011) Player personnel intern; Oakland Raiders (2012–2015) Scout; Oakland Raiders (2016–2019) Assistant director of pro scouting; DC Defenders (2022–2023) Director of player personnel; DC Defenders (2024–2025) General manager

Awards and highlights
- UFL champion (2025)

Career NFL statistics
- Total tackles: 157
- Sacks: 0.5
- Pass deflections: 9
- Interceptions: 2
- Defensive touchdowns: 1
- Stats at Pro Football Reference

Tahaya De'Von Hutchins (born February 14, 1981) is an American former professional football cornerback and former general manager for the DC Defenders of the United Football League (UFL). He was selected by the Indianapolis Colts in the sixth round of the 2004 NFL draft. He played college football at the University of Mississippi.

Hutchins was also a member of the Houston Texans and Atlanta Falcons in his career. The defensive back played 38 games with 16 starts for the Indianapolis Colts and Houston Texans from 2004 to 2007, and the Atlanta Falcons in 2008.

== College career ==
Hutchins committed to the University of Mississippi on February 7, 1999. Hutchins played in 36 games and recorded 11 interceptions.

== Professional career ==
=== Indianapolis Colts ===
Hutchins was selected in the sixth round with the 173rd overall pick in the 2004 NFL draft by the Indianapolis Colts.

During the 2004 NFL season, Hutchins played in 16 games, starting one game, and recorded 50 tackles, one interception, and one touchdown.

Hutchins only played in three games during the 2005 NFL season and only recorded six tackles

Hutchins was released on September 3, 2006.

=== Houston Texans ===
The Houston Texans signed Hutchins on November 16, 2006, where he appeared in 3 games recording 6 tackles.

Hutchins signed a one-year extension with the Texans during the offseason.

During the 2007 NFL season Hutchins started in 15 games, where he recorded 95 tackles, 1 interception.

=== Atlanta Falcons ===
On March 1, 2008, Hutchins signed a 4-year deal worth $9 million with the Atlanta Falcons.

Hutchins was placed on Injured Reserve with a Lisfranc Injury and missed the entire 2008 NFL season.

Hutchins was released on September 1, 2009.

== Executive career ==
=== Green Bay Packers ===
Hutchins joined the Green Bay Packers as a Player Personnel Intern for the 2011 NFL season.

=== Oakland Raiders ===
Hutchins joined the Oakland Raiders as a scout in 2012, and later became the Assistant Director of Pro Scouting in 2016.

=== DC Defenders ===
Hutchins joined the DC Defenders in 2022 as the Director of Player Personnel.
