= Wilrey Fontenot =

American football player (born 1984)

No. 29, 23
- Position: Cornerback

Personal information
- Born: October 14, 1984 (age 42); Humble, Texas, U.S.
- Listed height: 5 ft 10 in (1.78 m)
- Listed weight: 174 lb (79 kg)

Career information
- College: Arizona
- NFL draft: 2008: 7th round, 212th overall pick

Career history
- Atlanta Falcons (2008)*; Arizona Cardinals (2008–2009)*
- * Offseason or practice squad member only

Awards and highlights
- Sporting News Pac-10 All-Freshman (2004)
- Stats at Pro Football Reference

Wilrey Fontenot, III (born October 14, 1984) is an American former football cornerback. He was selected by the Atlanta Falcons in the seventh round of the 2008 NFL draft with the 212th overall pick. He played college football at Arizona.

Fontenot was also a member of the Arizona Cardinals.

== Early life ==
Fontenot started playing football as a youth in the Humble Area Football League in his home town.
