= Glenn Sharpe =

American football player (born 1984)

Profile
- Position: Cornerback

Personal information
- Born: February 27, 1984 (age 42); Miami, Florida, U.S.
- Listed height: 6 ft 0 in (1.83 m)
- Listed weight: 184 lb (83 kg)

Career information
- College: Miami (Fla.)
- NFL draft: 2008: undrafted

Career history
- Atlanta Falcons (2008–2009); New Orleans Saints (2009–2010)*; Indianapolis Colts (2010)*
- * Offseason or practice squad member only

Awards and highlights
- Super Bowl champion (XLIV); ACC Brian Piccolo Award (2006)

Glenn Sharpe (born February 27, 1984) is an American former professional football cornerback. He was signed by the Atlanta Falcons of the National Football League (NFL) as an undrafted free agent in 2008. Sharpe also played for the New Orleans Saints and Indianapolis Colts. He played college football for the Miami Hurricanes.

== College career ==
Sharpe played college football for the Miami Hurricanes. He is perhaps well known by Miami fans for a controversial pass interference call in the 2003 Fiesta Bowl at the end of the first overtime, in which he was flagged for pass interference in the end zone on 4th and 3 and Miami leading 24–17. The call kept Ohio State's drive alive and allowed them to tie the game, and they ultimately won in the second overtime 31–24, preventing the Hurricanes from repeating as national champions.

== Professional career ==
Pre-draft measurables
Height	Weight	Arm length	Hand span	40-yard dash	10-yard split	20-yard split	Vertical jump	Broad jump	Bench press
5 ft 11 1/2 in (1.82 m)	184 lb (83 kg)	31 in (0.79 m)	8 3/4 in (0.22 m)	4.49 s	1.51 s	2.60 s	37.0 in (0.94 m)	10 ft 2 in (3.10 m)	15 reps
All values from NFL Combine/Pro Day

Sharpe won a Super Bowl ring with the New Orleans Saints as a practice squad member when the Saints defeated the Indianapolis Colts in Super Bowl XLIV, 31–17. He was waived on June 21, 2010. He was signed by the Indianapolis Colts on August 23, 2010. He was released on September 4, 2010.

== Legal case ==
On February 22, 2012, Sharpe was arrested and accused of murder in DeKalb County, Georgia. He was held in the Dekalb County jail without bail.
