= Bobby James (American football) =

American football coach

Biographical details
- Education: Bloomsburg University (1995)

Playing career
- 1990–1994: Bloomsburg
- Position: Defensive back

Coaching career (HC unless noted)
- 1995–1996: Bloomsburg (DB/S&C)
- 1997–1998: Lenoir–Rhyne (DB/S&C)
- 1999–2000: Wilkes (DC/S&C)
- 2001: Drake (DC)
- 2002–2003: New Haven (DC/S&C)
- 2004–2006: Susquehanna (assoc. HC/DC/S&C)
- 2007: Wingate (S&C)
- 2008–2012: Wingate (DC/S&C)
- 2013–2015: Limestone
- 2017–2020: Temple (ST analyst)
- 2021–2022: East Henderson HS (NC)

Head coaching record
- Overall: 4–17 (college); 3–16 (high school)

Accomplishments and honors

Awards
- 2× All-PSAC (1993–1994)

Bobby James is an American former college football coach. He was the head football coach for Limestone College—now known as Limestone University—from 2013 to 2015 and East Henderson High School from 2021 to 2022. He also coached for Bloomsburg, Lenoir–Rhyne, Wilkes, Drake, New Haven, Susquehanna, Wingate, and Temple. He played college football at Bloomsburg as a defensive back and was a two-time All-Pennsylvania State Athletic Conference (PSAC) selection.

== Head coaching record ==
=== College ===
| Year | Team | Overall | Conference | Standing | Bowl/playoffs |
|---|---|---|---|---|---|
Limestone Saints (NCAA Division II independent) (2014–2015)
| 2014 | Limestone | 2–9 | | | |
| 2015 | Limestone | 2–8 | | | |
| Limestone: | | 4–17 | | | |
| Total: | | 4–17 | | | |

=== High school ===
| Year | Team | Overall | Conference | Standing | Bowl/playoffs |
|---|---|---|---|---|---|
East Henderson Eagles () (2021–2022)
| 2021 | East Henderson | 1–8 | 0–6 | 7th | |
| 2022 | East Henderson | 2–8 | 0–6 | 7th | |
| East Henderson: | | 3–16 | 0–12 | | |
| Total: | | 3–16 | | | |
