= Pat McCoy (American football) =

American football player (born 1980)

No. 64, 68
- Position: Offensive tackle

Personal information
- Born: December 14, 1980 (age 45); Fairfield, California, U.S.
- Listed height: 6 ft 5 in (1.96 m)
- Listed weight: 333 lb (151 kg)

Career information
- College: West Texas A&M
- NFL draft: 2006: undrafted

Career history
- Philadelphia Eagles (2006–2007); Atlanta Falcons (2007–2008)

Awards and highlights
- Consensus All-American (2005)

Patrick Anthony McCoy (born December 14, 1980) is an American former professional football player who was an offensive tackle in the National Football League (NFL). He played college football for the West Texas A&M Buffaloes. He was signed by the Philadelphia Eagles of the National Football League (NFL) as an undrafted free agent in 2006.
