= Robert James (linebacker) =

American football player (born 1983)

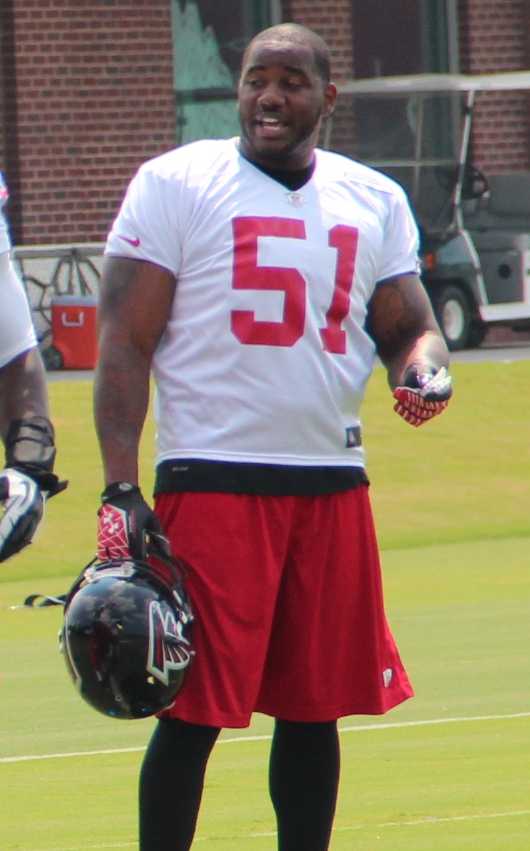
- James with the Atlanta Falcons in 2013

No. 45, 51, 59, 54
- Position: Linebacker

Personal information
- Born: December 26, 1983 (age 42); Phoenix, Arizona, U.S.
- Listed height: 5 ft 11 in (1.80 m)
- Listed weight: 224 lb (102 kg)

Career information
- High school: Maryvale (Phoenix)
- College: Arizona State
- NFL draft: 2008: 5th round, 138th overall pick

Career history
- Atlanta Falcons (2008–2013); Baltimore Ravens (2013); Kansas City Chiefs (2013)

Awards and highlights
- First-team All-Pac-10 (2007)

Career NFL statistics
- Total tackles: 11
- Stats at Pro Football Reference

Robert William James (born December 26, 1983) is an American former professional football player who was a linebacker in the National Football League (NFL). He played college football for the Arizona State Sun Devils and was selected by the Atlanta Falcons in the fifth round of the 2008 NFL draft.

== Professional career ==
=== Atlanta Falcons ===
James was selected as a fifth round (138th overall) draft choice by the Atlanta Falcons in the 2008 NFL draft. He was signed to the Falcons practice squad on September 6, 2009 and was elevated to the 53-man roster on December 29, 2009.

He was waived by the Falcons on October 5, 2010, but was re-signed to the team's practice squad a day later. Atlanta signed him to the active roster for the regular season finale at Tampa Bay where he saw action on special teams.

He was released during final cuts on September 3, 2011, and re-signed to the Falcons' practice squad the following day. On December 28, 2011, a day after the Falcons placed veteran linebacker Mike Peterson on the injured reserve list, James was signed to the active roster.

James was released by the Falcons during the final cuts after the 2013 preseason.

=== Baltimore Ravens ===
James was claimed off waivers by the Baltimore Ravens on September 1, 2013. He was released on September 11, 2013.

=== Kansas City Chiefs ===
James signed with the Kansas City Chiefs on December 31, 2013, and appeared in their Wild Card loss to the Indianapolis Colts. He was released on March 6, 2014.
