= 2011 Atlanta Falcons season =

NFL team season

- Owner: Arthur Blank
- General manager: Thomas Dimitroff
- Head coach: Mike Smith
- Offensive coordinator: Mike Mularkey
- Defensive coordinator: Brian VanGorder
- Home stadium: Georgia Dome

Results
- Record: 10–6
- Division place: 2nd NFC South
- Playoffs: Lost Wild Card Playoffs (at Giants) 2–24
- Pro Bowlers: TE Tony Gonzalez; WR Roddy White

The 2011 season was the Atlanta Falcons' 46th season in the National Football League (NFL) and the fourth under head coach Mike Smith.

Finishing the regular season 10–6, the Falcons clinched the #5 seed in the playoffs. Atlanta's season ended quickly as they lost 24–2 to the eventual Super Bowl XLVI champion New York Giants in the opening round.

This is also the first time the franchise clinched consecutive playoff berths, and the first time it won 10 or more games in consecutive seasons.

== Offseason ==
=== Signings ===
Pos.	Player	2010 Team	Contract
DE	Ray Edwards	Minnesota Vikings	5 years, $27.5 million
OLB	Stephen Nicholas	Atlanta Falcons	5 years, $17.5 million
K	Matt Bryant	Atlanta Falcons	4 years, $10.7 million

=== Departures ===
Pos.	Player	2011 Team
WR	Michael Jenkins	Minnesota Vikings
DE	Jamaal Anderson	Indianapolis Colts
WR	Brian Finneran	

=== 2011 NFL draft ===
2011 Atlanta Falcons draft
Round	Pick	Player	Position	College	Notes
1	6	Julio Jones *	WR	Alabama	from Cleveland
3	91	Akeem Dent	ILB	Georgia	
5	145	Jacquizz Rodgers	RB	Oregon State	from St. Louis
6	192	Matt Bosher	P	Miami (FL)	
7	210	Andrew Jackson	OG	Fresno State	from Detroit ^{[a]}
7	230	Cliff Matthews	DE	South Carolina	from New England ^{[b]}
Made roster * Made at least one Pro Bowl during career

^{^[a]} The Falcons acquired this seventh-round selection and a 2010 sixth-round selection in a trade that sent CB Chris Houston to the Detroit Lions.
^{^[b]} The Falcons acquired this seventh-round selection in a trade that sent T Quinn Ojinnaka to the New England Patriots.

=== Undrafted free agents ===
Name	Position	College
Drew Davis	Wide receiver	Oregon
Adam Froman	Quarterback	Louisville
Matt Hansen	Safety	Rhode Island
Tom McCarthy	Defense end	Yale
Darrin Walls	Cornerback	Notre Dame
Ryan Winterswyk	Tight end	Boise State

== Staff ==
Atlanta Falcons 2011 staff
Front office: Owner – Arthur Blank; President/CEO – Rich McKay; General manager – Thomas Dimitroff; Director of football administration – Nick Polk; Director of player personnel – Les Snead; Assistant director of player personnel – Lionel Vital; Director of college scouting – Dave Caldwell; Head coaches: Head coach – Mike Smith; Offensive coaches: Offensive coordinator – Mike Mularkey; Quarterbacks – Bob Bratkowski; Running backs – Gerald Brown; Wide receivers – Terry Robiskie; Tight ends – Chris Scelfo; Offensive line – Paul T Boudreau; Assistant offensive line – Paul Dunn; Offensive assistant – Glenn Thomas; Assistant to the head coach/offense – Andrew Weidinger	Defensive coaches: Defensive coordinator – Brian VanGorder; Defensive line – Ray Hamilton; Linebackers – Glenn Pires; Defensive backs – Alvin Reynolds; Secondary – Tim Lewis; Defensive assistant – Mark Collins; Special teams coaches: Special teams coordinator – Keith Armstrong; Assistant special teams – Eric Sutulovich; Strength and conditioning: Director of athletic performance – Jeff Fish; Strength and conditioning assistant – Jonas Beauchemin

== Final roster ==
2011 Atlanta Falcons roster
Quarterbacks (QB): 8 Chris Redman; 2 Matt Ryan; 4 John Parker Wilson; Running backs (RB): 42 Mike Cox FB; 22 Jacquizz Rodgers; 35 Antone Smith; 44 Jason Snelling; 33 Michael Turner; Wide receivers (WR): 12 Kevin Cone; 83 Harry Douglas; 11 Julio Jones; 80 Kerry Meier; 14 Eric Weems RS; 84 Roddy White; Tight ends (TE): 88 Tony Gonzalez; 89 Reggie Kelly; 81 Michael Palmer	Offensive linemen (OL): 72 Sam Baker T; 63 Justin Blalock G; 73 Kirk Chambers G/T; 77 Tyson Clabo T; 61 Joe Hawley G/C; 62 Todd McClure C; 75 Garrett Reynolds G; 66 Brett Romberg C; 74 Will Svitek T; Defensive linemen (DL): 55 John Abraham DE; 95 Jonathan Babineaux DT; 71 Kroy Biermann DE; 93 Ray Edwards DE; 94 Peria Jerry DT; 98 Cliff Matthews DE; 91 Corey Peters DT; 90 Lawrence Sidbury DE; 99 Vance Walker DT	Linebackers (LB): 59 Spencer Adkins OLB; 52 Akeem Dent MLB; 51 Robert James OLB; 50 Curtis Lofton MLB; 54 Stephen Nicholas OLB; 56 Sean Weatherspoon OLB; Defensive backs (DB): 28 Thomas DeCoud FS; 24 Dominique Franks CB; 20 Brent Grimes CB; 25 William Moore SS; 21 Chris Owens CB; 23 Dunta Robinson CB; 36 James Sanders S; 39 Shann Schillinger FS; 29 Darrin Walls CB; Special teams (ST): 5 Matt Bosher P; 3 Matt Bryant K; 82 Joe Zelenka LS	Practice squad: 85 Marquez Branson TE (IR); 19 Drew Davis WR; 87 Tommy Gallarda TE; 30 Matt Hansen S; 69 Andrew Jackson G (IR); 67 Kyle Jolly T; 97 Carlton Powell DT; 41 Suaesi Tuimaunei S; 65 Jose Valdez T; 86 Ryan Winterswyk TE; Reserve: 26 Kelvin Hayden CB (IR); 79 Mike Johnson G (IR); 34 Ovie Mughelli FB (IR); 53 Mike Peterson LB (IR); Rookies in italics 53 active, 6 reserve, 8 practice squad

== Preseason ==
=== Schedule ===
The Falcons' preseason schedule was announced on April 12, 2011.

Week	Date	Opponent	Result	Record	Game site	NFL.com recap
1	August 12	Miami Dolphins	L 23–28	0–1	Georgia Dome	Recap
2	August 19	at Jacksonville Jaguars	L 13–15	0–2	EverBank Field	Recap
3	August 27	at Pittsburgh Steelers	L 16–34	0–3	Heinz Field	Recap
4	September 1	Baltimore Ravens	L 7–21	0–4	Georgia Dome	Recap

== Regular season ==
=== Schedule ===
Week	Date	Opponent	Result	Record	Game site	NFL.com recap
1	September 11	at Chicago Bears	L 12–30	0–1	Soldier Field	Recap
2	September 18	Philadelphia Eagles	W 35–31	1–1	Georgia Dome	Recap
3	September 25	at Tampa Bay Buccaneers	L 13–16	1–2	Raymond James Stadium	Recap
4	October 2	at Seattle Seahawks	W 30–28	2–2	CenturyLink Field	Recap
5	October 9	Green Bay Packers	L 14–25	2–3	Georgia Dome	Recap
6	October 16	Carolina Panthers	W 31–17	3–3	Georgia Dome	Recap
7	October 23	at Detroit Lions	W 23–16	4–3	Ford Field	Recap
8	Bye					
9	November 6	at Indianapolis Colts	W 31–7	5–3	Lucas Oil Stadium	Recap
10	November 13	New Orleans Saints	L 23–26 (OT)	5–4	Georgia Dome	Recap
11	November 20	Tennessee Titans	W 23–17	6–4	Georgia Dome	Recap
12	November 27	Minnesota Vikings	W 24–14	7–4	Georgia Dome	Recap
13	December 4	at Houston Texans	L 10–17	7–5	Reliant Stadium	Recap
14	December 11	at Carolina Panthers	W 31–23	8–5	Bank of America Stadium	Recap
15	December 15	Jacksonville Jaguars	W 41–14	9–5	Georgia Dome	Recap
16	December 26	at New Orleans Saints	L 16–45	9–6	Mercedes-Benz Superdome	Recap
17	January 1	Tampa Bay Buccaneers	W 45–24	10–6	Georgia Dome	Recap

=== Game summaries ===
==== Week 1: at Chicago Bears ====
Week One: Atlanta Falcons at Chicago Bears – Game summary

Quarter	1	2	3	4	Total
Falcons	3	0	3	6	12
Bears	10	6	14	0	30

at Soldier Field, Chicago, Illinois

- Date: September 11
- Game time: 1:00 p.m. EDT/12:00 p.m. CDT
- Game weather: 76 °F or 24.4 °C (Partly Cloudy)
- Game attendance: 62,115
- Referee: Ed Hochuli
- TV announcers (Fox): Kenny Albert, Daryl Johnston and Tony Siragusa

Game information

First quarter

- CHI – Robbie Gould 41-yard field goal, Bears 3–0.
- ATL – Matt Bryant 48-yard field goal, Tied 3–3.
- CHI – Matt Forte 56-yard pass from Jay Cutler (Robbie Gould kick), Bears 10–3.

Second quarter

- CHI – Robbie Gould 23-yard field goal, Bears 13–3.
- CHI – Robbie Gould 26-yard field goal, Bears 16–3.

Third quarter

- ATL – Matt Bryant 25-yard field goal, Bears 16–6.
- CHI – Matt Spaeth 1-yard pass from Jay Cutler (Robbie Gould kick), Bears 23–6.
- CHI – Brian Urlacher 12-yard fumble return (Robbie Gould kick), Bears 30–6.

Fourth quarter

- ATL – Kroy Biermann 50-yard interception return (Matt Ryan run failed), Bears 30–12.

Top passers

- ATL – Matt Ryan – 31/47, 319 yards, 1 interception
- CHI – Jay Cutler – 22/32, 312 yards, 2 touchdowns, 1 interception

Top rushers

- ATL – Michael Turner – 10 rushes, 100 yards
- CHI – Matt Forte – 16 rushes, 68 yards

Top receivers

- ATL – Tony Gonzalez – 5 receptions, 72 yards
- CHI – Matt Forte – 5 receptions, 90 yards, 1 touchdown

Top tacklers

- ATL – Sean Weatherspoon – 9 tackles, 1 assist
- CHI – Brian Urlacher – 6 tackles, 2 assists

The Falcons started their season out on the road against the Bears. With the loss, the team fell to 0–1.

==== Week 2: vs. Philadelphia Eagles ====
Week Two: Philadelphia Eagles at Atlanta Falcons – Game summary

Quarter	1	2	3	4	Total
Eagles	0	10	21	0	31
Falcons	7	7	7	14	35

at Georgia Dome, Atlanta, Georgia

- Date: September 18
- Game time: 8:20 p.m. EDT
- Game weather: Played indoors (dome stadium)
- Game attendance: 69,608
- Referee: Carl Cheffers
- TV announcers (NBC): Al Michaels, Cris Collinsworth and Michele Tafoya

Game information

First quarter

- ATL – Roddy White 2-yard pass from Matt Ryan (Matt Bryant kick), Falcons 7–0

Second quarter

- PHI – Jeremy Maclin 5-yard pass from Michael Vick (Alex Henery kick), Tied 7–7
- PHI – Alex Henery 22-yard Field Goal, Eagles 10–7
- ATL – Tony Gonzalez 4-yard pass from Matt Ryan (Alex Bryant kick), Falcons 14–10

Third quarter

- ATL – Tony Gonzalez 17-yard pass from Matt Ryan, Falcons 21–10
- PHI – Jeremy Maclin 36-yard pass from Michael Vick (Alex Henery kick), Falcons 21–17
- PHI – LeSean McCoy 8-yard run (Alex Henery kick), Eagles 24–21
- PHI – LeSean McCoy 2-yard run (Alex Henery kick), Eagles 31–21

Fourth quarter

- ATL – Ovie Mughelli 1-yard pass from Matt Ryan (Matt Bryant kick), Eagles 31–28
- ATL – Michael Turner 3-yard run (Matt Bryant kick), Falcons 35–31

Top passers

- PHI – Michael Vick – 19/28, 242 yards, 2 touchdowns, 1 interception
- ATL – Matt Ryan – 17/28, 195 yards, 4 touchdowns, 2 interceptions

Top rushers

- PHI – Lesean McCoy – 18 carries, 95 yards, 2 touchdowns
- ATL – Michael Turner – 21 carries, 114 yards, 1 touchdown

Top receivers

- PHI – Jeremy Maclin – 13 receptions, 171 yards, 2 touchdowns
- ATL – Tony Gonzalez – 7 receptions, 83 yards, 2 touchdowns

Top tacklers

- PHI – Jamar Chaney – 5 tackles, 4 assists
- ATL – Sean Weatherspoon – 7 tackles, 3 assists

For the regular season opener at home, the Falcons faced the Eagles. The win improved the team to 1–1 and also helped Starting QB Matt Ryan improve to 4–0 as a regular season starter during home openers.

==== Week 3: at Tampa Bay Buccaneers ====
Week Three: Atlanta Falcons at Tampa Bay Buccaneers – Game summary

Quarter	1	2	3	4	Total
Falcons	0	3	0	10	13
Buccaneers	3	10	3	0	16

at Raymond James Stadium, Tampa, Florida

- Date: September 25
- Game time: 4:15 p.m. EDT
- Game weather: 89 °F or 31.7 °C (Rain)
- Game attendance: 46,995
- Referee: Clete Blakeman
- TV announcers (Fox): Thom Brennaman, Brian Billick and Laura Okmin

Game information

First quarter

Second quarter

Third quarter

Fourth quarter

Top passers

- ATL – Matt Ryan – 27/47, 330 yards, 1 touchdown, 1 interception
- TB – Josh Freeman – 22/32, 180 yards, 0 touchdowns, 2 interceptions

Top rushers

- ATL – Michael Turner – 11 rushes, 20 yards
- TB – LeGarrette Blount – 24 rushes, 81 yards

Top receivers

- ATL – Roddy White – 9 receptions, 140 yards
- TB – Earnest Graham – 7 receptions, 37 yards

Top tacklers

- ATL – Sean Weatherspoon – 10 tackles, 1 assist
- TB – E. J. Biggers – 7 tackles

With the loss, the Falcons fell to 1–2.

==== Week 4: at Seattle Seahawks ====
Week Four: Atlanta Falcons at Seattle Seahawks – Game summary

Quarter	1	2	3	4	Total
Falcons	7	17	3	3	30
Seahawks	0	7	14	7	28

at CenturyLink Field, Seattle, Washington

- Date: October 2
- Game time: 4:05 p.m. EDT/1:05 p.m. PDT
- Game weather: 58 °F or 14.4 °C (Partly Sunny)
- Game attendance: 66,266
- Referee: Walt Anderson
- TV announcers (Fox): Craig Bolerjack and John Lynch

Game information

First quarter TD Tony Gonzalez 1 Yd Pass From Matt Ryan (Matt Bryant Kick) ATL 7–0 Second quarter

TD 10:13 Michael Turner 21 Yd Run (Matt Bryant Kick) ATL 14–0

TD 08:46 Sidney Rice 52 Yd Pass From Tarvaris Jackson (Steven Hauschka Kick) ATL 14–7

TD 02:48 Michael Turner 1 Yd Run (Matt Bryant Kick) ATL 21–7

FG 00:25 Matt Bryant 47 Yd ATL 24–7 Third quarter FG 13:40 Matt Bryant 50 Yd ATL 27–7

TD 10:01 Mike Williams 6 Yd Pass From Tarvaris Jackson (Steven Hauschka Kick) ATL 27–14

TD 03:07 Marshawn Lynch 11 Yd Run (Steven Hauschka Kick) ATL 27–21

Fourth quarter

FG 11:38 Matt Bryant 42 Yd ATL 30–21

TD 08:13 Ben Obomanu 8 Yd Pass From Tarvaris Jackson (Steven Hauschka Kick) ATL 30–28

Top passers

- ATL – M. Ryan 291 Yards
- SEA – T. Jackson 319 Yards

Top rushers

- ATL – M. Turner 70 Yards
- SEA – M. Lynch 24 Yards

Top receivers

- ATL – J. Jones 127 Yards
- SEA – D. Baldwin 84 Yards

Top tacklers

- ATL – W. Moore 8 Tackles
- SEA – D. Hawthorne 10 tackles

With the win, the Falcons improved to 2–2.

==== Week 5: vs. Green Bay Packers ====
Week Five: Green Bay Packers at Atlanta Falcons – Game summary

Quarter	1	2	3	4	Total
Packers	0	6	9	10	25
Falcons	7	7	0	0	14

at Georgia Dome, Atlanta, Georgia

- Date: October 9
- Game time: 8:20 p.m. EDT
- Game weather: Played indoors (dome stadium)
- Game attendance: 69,576
- Referee: Jeff Triplette
- TV announcers (NBC): Al Michaels, Cris Collinsworth and Michele Tafoya

Game information

First quarter

Second quarter

Third quarter

Fourth quarter

Top passers

- GB – Aaron Rodgers – 26/39, 396 yards, 2 TD, 0 INT
- ATL – Matt Ryan – 18/32, 167 yards, 1 TD, 2 INT

Top rushers

- GB – James Starks – 12 rushes, 40 yards
- ATL – Michael Turner – 16 rushes, 56 yards, 1 TD

Top receivers

- GB – James Jones – 5 receptions, 140 yards, 1 TD
- ATL – Tony Gonzalez – 6 receptions, 60 yards

Top tacklers

- GB – Desmond Bishop – 7 tackles, 1 sack
- ATL – Sean Weatherspoon – 11 tackles

The Falcons went home for a week 5 duel with the undefeated Packers. This would be a rematch of last year's NFC Divisional Round. With the loss, the Falcons fell to 2–3.

==== Week 6: vs. Carolina Panthers ====
Week Six: Carolina Panthers at Atlanta Falcons – Game summary

Quarter	1	2	3	4	Total
Panthers	3	7	7	0	17
Falcons	7	7	0	17	31

at Georgia Dome, Atlanta, Georgia

- Date: October 16
- Game time: 1:00 p.m. EDT
- Game weather: Played indoors (dome stadium)
- Game attendance: 69,047
- Referee: Pete Morelli
- TV announcers (Fox): Dick Stockton and John Lynch

Game information

First quarter

Second quarter

Third quarter

Fourth quarter

Top passers

- CAR –
- ATL –

Top rushers

- CAR –
- ATL –

Top receivers

- CAR –
- ATL –

Top tacklers

- CAR –
- ATL –

With their 3rd-straight win over the Panthers, the Falcons improved to 3–3.

==== Week 7: at Detroit Lions ====
Week Seven: Atlanta Falcons at Detroit Lions – Game summary

Quarter	1	2	3	4	Total
Falcons	10	7	3	3	23
Lions	3	3	10	0	16

at Ford Field, Detroit, Michigan

- Date: October 23
- Game time: 1:00 p.m. EDT
- Game weather: Played indoors (dome stadium)
- Game attendance: 63,625
- Referee: Bill Leavy
- TV announcers (Fox): Sam Rosen, Brian Billick and Laura Okmin
- Recap
  Gamebook

Game information

First quarter

- DET – Jason Hanson 43-yard field goal, Lions 3–0, Drive: 4 plays, −10 yards, 1:47.
- ATL – Matt Bryant 23-yard field goal, Tied 3–3, Drive: 7 plays, 21 yards, 3:03.
- ATL – Matt Ryan 1-yard run (Matt Bryant kick), Falcons 10–3, 5 plays, 28 yards, 2:46.

Second quarter

- DET – Jason Hanson 38-yard field goal, Falcons 10–6, Drive: 9 plays, 50 yards, 4:12.
- ATL – Roddy White 18-yard pass from Matt Ryan (Matt Bryant kick), Falcons 17–6, Drive: 7 plays, 81 yards, 3:05

Third quarter

- DET – Jason Hanson 29-yard field goal, Falcons 17–9, Drive: 6 plays, 35 yards, 2:25.
- ATL – Matt Bryant 47 yard, Falcons 20–9, Drive: 7 plays, 51 yards, 2;33.
- DET – Calvin Johnson 57-yard pass from Matthew Stafford (Jason Hanson kick), Falcons 20–16, Drive: 6 plays, 84 yards, 3:07.

Fourth quarter

- ATL – Matt Bryant 40-yard field goal, Falcons 23–16, Drive: 9 plays, 25 yards, 4:42.

Top passers

- ATL – Matt Ryan – 20/34, 218 yards, 1 touchdown, 2 interceptions
- DET – Matthew Stafford – 15/32, 183 yards, 1 touchdown

Top rushers

- ATL – Michael Turner – 27 carries, 122 yards
- DET – Maurice Morris – 9 carries, 50 yards

Top receivers

- ATL – Tony Gonzalez – 5 receptions, 62 yards
- DET – Calvin Johnson – 5 receptions, 115 yards, 1 touchdown

Top tacklers

- ATL – Curtis Lofton – 5 tackles, 5 assists
- DET – DeAndre Levy – 6 tackles, 5 assists

With the win, the Falcons went into their bye week at 4–3.

==== Week 9: at Indianapolis Colts ====
Week Nine: Atlanta Falcons at Indianapolis Colts – Game summary

Quarter	1	2	3	4	Total
Falcons	14	7	7	3	31
Colts	0	7	0	0	7

at Lucas Oil Stadium, Indianapolis, Indiana

- Date: November 6
- Game time: 1:00 p.m. EST
- Game weather: 57 °F or 13.9 °C (sunny, retractable roof open)
- Game attendance: 65,218
- Referee: Mike Carey
- TV announcers (Fox): Ron Pitts, Jim Mora, Jr.

Game information

First quarter

Second quarter

Third quarter

Fourth quarter

Top passers

- ATL –
- IND –

Top rushers

- ATL –
- IND –

Top receivers

- ATL –
- IND –

Top tacklers

- ATL –
- IND –

With the win, the Falcons improved to 5–3 and went 2–13 overall against the Colts.

==== Week 10: vs. New Orleans Saints ====
Week Ten: New Orleans Saints at Atlanta Falcons – Game summary

Quarter	1	2	3	4	OT	Total
Saints	3	7	7	6	3	26
Falcons	3	3	7	10	0	23

at Georgia Dome, Atlanta, Georgia

- Date: November 13
- Game time: 1:00 p.m. EST
- Game weather: Played indoors (dome stadium)
- Game attendance: 70,359
- Referee: Terry McAulay
- TV announcers (Fox): Kenny Albert, Daryl Johnston and Tony Siragusa

Game information

First quarter

- ATL – M.Bryant 36 yd. Field Goal Falcons 3–0. Drive: 16 plays, 61 yards, 8:40.
- NO – J.Kasay 52 yd. Field Goal Saints 3–3. Drive: 8 plays, 30 yards, 3:32.

Second quarter

- ATL – M.Bryant 29 yd. Field Goal Falcons 6–3. Drive: 9 plays, 45 yards, 5:21.
- NO – J.Graham 21 yd. pass from D.Brees (J.Kasay kick) Saints 10–6. Drive: 3 plays, 50 yards, 1:01.

Third quarter

- ATL – J.Snelling 21 yd. pass from M.Ryan (M.Bryant kick) Falcons 13–10. Drive: 10 plays, 70 yards, 6:04.
- NO – R.Meachem 33 yd. pass from D.Brees (J.Kasay kick) Saints 17–13. Drive: 7 plays, 82 yards, 3:37.

Fourth quarter

- NO – J.Kasay 48 yd. Field Goal Saints 20–13. Drive: 6 plays, −4 yards, 2:56.
- NO – J.Kasay 44 yd. Field Goal Saints 23–13. Drive: 8 plays, 62 yards, 3:35.
- ATL – T.Gonzalez 20 yd. pass from M.Ryan (M.Bryant kick) Falcons 20–23. Drive: 9 plays, 81 yards, 3:00.
- ATL – M.Bryant 27 yd. Field Goal Falcons 23–23. Drive: 13 plays, 85 yards, 1:55.

Overtime

- NO – J.Kasay 26 yd. Field Goal Saints 26–23. Drive: 4 plays, 21 yards, 2:21.

Top passers

- NO – Drew Brees – 30/43, 322 yards, 2 TD
- ATL – Matt Ryan – 29/52, 351 yards, 2 TD, 1 INT

Top rushers

- NO – Pierre Thomas – 6 rushes, 29 yards
- ATL – Michael Turner – 22 rushes, 96 yards

Top receivers

- NO – Marques Colston – 8 rec, 113 yards
- ATL – Harry Douglas – 8 rec, 133 yards

Top tacklers

- NO – Roman Harper – 10 tackles, 3 assists, 1 sack
- ATL – Thomas DeCoud – 7 tackles, 1 assists

With the loss, the Falcons fell to 5–4.

==== Week 11: vs. Tennessee Titans ====
Week Eleven: Tennessee Titans at Atlanta Falcons – Game summary

Quarter	1	2	3	4	Total
Titans	0	3	7	7	17
Falcons	7	6	10	0	23

at Georgia Dome, Atlanta, Georgia

- Date: November 20
- Game time: 4:15 p.m. EST
- Game weather: Played indoors (dome stadium)
- Game attendance: 68,164
- Referee: John Parry
- TV announcers (CBS): Ian Eagle and Dan Fouts

Game information

First quarter

Second quarter

Third quarter

Fourth quarter

Top passers

- TEN –
- ATL –

Top rushers

- TEN –
- ATL –

Top receivers

- TEN –
- ATL –

Top tacklers

- TEN –
- ATL –

With the win, the Falcons improved to 6–4.

==== Week 12: vs. Minnesota Vikings ====
Week Twelve: Minnesota Vikings at Atlanta Falcons – Game summary

Quarter	1	2	3	4	Total
Vikings	0	0	7	7	14
Falcons	7	10	0	7	24

at Georgia Dome, Atlanta, Georgia

- Date: November 27
- Game time: 1:00 p.m. EST
- Game weather: Played indoors (dome stadium)
- Game attendance: 68,115
- Referee: Alberto Riveron
- TV announcers (Fox): Thom Brennaman, Brian Billick and Laura Okmin

Game information

First quarter

Second quarter

Third quarter

Fourth quarter

Top passers

- MIN –
- ATL –

Top rushers

- MIN –
- ATL –

Top receivers

- MIN –
- ATL –

Top tacklers

- MIN –
- ATL –

With the win, the Falcons improved to 7–4.

==== Week 13: at Houston Texans ====
Week Thirteen: Atlanta Falcons at Houston Texans – Game summary

Quarter	1	2	3	4	Total
Falcons	0	3	7	0	10
Texans	3	7	0	7	17

at Reliant Stadium, Houston, Texas

- Date: December 4
- Game time: 1:00 p.m. EST/12:00 p.m. CST
- Game weather: Played indoors (retractable roof closed)
- Game attendance: 71,545
- Referee: Bill Leavy
- TV announcers (Fox): Kenny Albert, Daryl Johnston and Tony Siragusa

Game information

First quarter

Second quarter

Third quarter

Fourth quarter

Top passers

- ATL –
- HOU –

Top rushers

- ATL –
- HOU –

Top receivers

- ATL –
- HOU –

Top tacklers

- ATL –
- HOU –

With the loss, the Falcons fell to 7–5.

==== Week 14: at Carolina Panthers ====
Week Fourteen: Atlanta Falcons at Carolina Panthers – Game summary

Quarter	1	2	3	4	Total
Falcons	7	0	10	14	31
Panthers	7	16	0	0	23

at Bank of America Stadium, Charlotte, North Carolina

- Date: December 11
- Game time: 1:00 p.m. EST
- Game weather: 43 °F or 6.1 °C (Sunny)
- Game attendance: 72,680
- Referee: Walt Anderson
- TV announcers (Fox): Ron Pitts, Jim Mora, Jr. and Drea Avent

Game information

First quarter

Second quarter

Third quarter

Fourth quarter

Top passers

- ATL –
- CAR –

Top rushers

- ATL –
- CAR –

Top receivers

- ATL –
- CAR –

Top tacklers

- ATL –
- CAR –

With the win, the Falcons improved to 8–5.

==== Week 15: vs. Jacksonville Jaguars ====
Week Fifteen: Jacksonville Jaguars at Atlanta Falcons – Game summary

Quarter	1	2	3	4	Total
Jaguars	0	0	7	7	14
Falcons	10	17	14	0	41

at Georgia Dome, Atlanta, Georgia

- Date: December 15
- Game time: 8:20 p.m. EST
- Game weather: Played indoors (dome stadium)
- Game attendance: 68,856
- Referee: Ron Winter
- TV announcers (NFLN): Brad Nessler, Mike Mayock and Alex Flanagan

Game information

First quarter

Second quarter

Third quarter

Fourth quarter

Top passers

- JAC –
- ATL –

Top rushers

- JAC –
- ATL –

Top receivers

- JAC –
- ATL –

Top tacklers

- JAC –
- ATL –

With the win, the Falcons improved to 9–5.

==== Week 16: at New Orleans Saints ====
Week Sixteen: Atlanta Falcons at New Orleans Saints – Game summary

Quarter	1	2	3	4	Total
Falcons	10	0	3	3	16
Saints	7	14	10	14	45

at Mercedes-Benz Superdome, New Orleans, Louisiana

- Date: December 26
- Game time: 8:30 p.m. EST/7:30 p.m. CST
- Game weather: Played indoors (dome stadium)
- Game attendance: 70,086
- Referee: Jeff Triplette
- TV announcers (ESPN): Mike Tirico, Ron Jaworski, Jon Gruden and Suzy Kolber

Game information

First quarter

- ATL – M.Bryant 34 yd. Field Goal Falcons 3–0. Drive: 11 plays, 64 yards, 6:07.
- NO – P.Thomas 4 yd. run (J.Kasay kick) Saints 7–3. Drive: 8 plays, 84 yards, 3:28.
- ATL – J.Jones 21 yd. pass from M.Ryan (M.Bryant kick) Falcons 10–7. Drive: 8 plays, 72 yards, 3:54.

Second quarter

- NO – M.Colston 8 yd. pass from D.Brees (J.Kasay kick) Saints 14–10. Drive: 10 plays, 81 yards, 3:59.
- NO – J.Graham 9 yd. pass from D.Brees (J.Kasay kick) Saints 21–10. Drive: 10 plays, 80 yards, 1:55.

Third quarter

- NO – R.Meachem 24 yd. pass from D.Brees (J.Kasay kick) Saints 28–10. Drive: 6 plays, 86 yards, 3:15.
- ATL – M.Bryant 51 yd. Field Goal Falcons 13–28. Drive: 5 plays, 47 yards, 3:47.
- NO – J.Kasay 29 yd. Field Goal Saints 31–13. Drive: 4 plays, 3 yards, 1:37.

Fourth quarter

- ATL – M.Bryant 30 yd. Field Goal Falcons 16–31. Drive: 16 plays, 68 yards, 5:21.
- NO – M.Jenkins 30 yd. fumble return (J.Kasay kick) Saints 38–16.
- NO – D.Sproles 9 yd. pass from D.Brees (J.Kasay kick) Saints 45–16. Drive: 6 plays, 33 yards, 2:17.

Top passers

- NO – Drew Brees – 23/39, 307 yards, 4 TD, 2 INT
- ATL – Matt Ryan – 34/52, 373 yards, 1 TD

Top rushers

- NO – Darren Sproles – 5 rushes, 67 yards
- ATL – Michael Turner – 11 rushes, 39 yards

Top receivers

- NO – Marques Colston – 7 rec, 81 yards, 1 TD
- ATL – Julio Jones – 8 rec, 128 yards, 1 TD

Top tacklers

- NO – Jabari Greer – 8 tackles, 2 assist
- ATL – Thomas DeCoud – 7 tackles, 3 assist

With the loss, the Falcons fell to 9–6, but were able to clinch a playoff spot due to the Chicago Bears 35–21 loss to the Green Bay Packers Sunday night.

==== Week 17: vs. Tampa Bay Buccaneers ====
Week Seventeen: Tampa Bay Buccaneers at Atlanta Falcons – Game summary

Quarter	1	2	3	4	Total
Buccaneers	0	7	11	6	24
Falcons	21	21	0	3	45

at Georgia Dome, Atlanta, Georgia

- Date: January 1
- Game time: 4:15 p.m. EST
- Game weather: Played indoors (dome stadium)
- Game attendance: 68,167
- Referee: Scott Green
- TV announcers (Fox): Dick Stockton & John Lynch

Game information

First quarter

Second quarter

Third quarter

Fourth quarter

Top passers

- TB –
- ATL –

Top rushers

- TB –
- ATL –

Top receivers

- TB –
- ATL –

Top tacklers

- TB –
- ATL –

With the win, the Falcons finished the season at 10–6 and captured the NFC's #5 seed.

=== Standings ===
NFC South
	W	L	T	PCT	DIV	CONF	PF	PA	STK
^{(3)} New Orleans Saints	13	3	0	.813	5–1	9–3	547	339	W8
^{(5)} Atlanta Falcons	10	6	0	.625	3–3	7–5	402	350	W1
Carolina Panthers	6	10	0	.375	2–4	3–9	406	429	L1
Tampa Bay Buccaneers	4	12	0	.250	2–4	3–9	287	494	L10

== Postseason ==
=== Schedule ===
Playoff round	Date	Kickoff	Opponent (seed)	Results		Game site	TV	NFL.com recap
Playoff round	Date	Kickoff	Opponent (seed)	Final score	Team record	Game site	TV	NFL.com recap
Wild Card	January 8, 2012	1:00 p.m. EST	at New York Giants (4)	L 2–24	0–1	MetLife Stadium	Fox	Recap

=== Game summaries ===
==== NFC Wild Card Playoff Game: at #4 New York Giants ====
NFC Wild Card Playoff Game: Atlanta Falcons at New York Giants – Game summary

Quarter	1	2	3	4	Total
Falcons	0	2	0	0	2
Giants	0	7	10	7	24

at MetLife Stadium, East Rutherford, New Jersey

- Date: January 8, 2012
- Game time: 1:00 p.m. EST
- Game weather: 44 °F (6.7 °C), Partly Cloudy
- Game attendance: 79,909
- Referee: Carl Cheffers
- TV announcers (Fox): Joe Buck, Troy Aikman and Pam Oliver

Game information

First quarter

- No scoring plays

Second quarter

- ATL – Intentional Grounding Penalty on Eli Manning in end zone for a Safety, 13:44. Falcons 2–0.
- NYG – Hakeem Nicks 4-yard pass from Eli Manning (Lawrence Tynes kick), 2:47. Giants 7–2. Drive: 13 plays, 85 yards, 7:32.

Third quarter

- NYG – Lawrence Tynes 22-yard field goal, 7:51. Giants 10–2. Drive: 11 plays, 72 yards, 4:47.
- NYG – Hakeem Nicks 72-yard pass from Eli Manning (Lawrence Tynes kick), 2:44. Giants 17–2. Drive: 3 plays, 79 yards, 1:32.

Fourth quarter

- NYG – Mario Manningham 27-yard pass from Eli Manning (Lawrence Tynes kick), 9:55. Giants 24–2. Drive: 10 plays, 85 yards, 5:38.

Top passers

- ATL – Matt Ryan – 24/41, 199 yards
- NYG – Eli Manning – 23/32, 277 yards, 3 TD

Top rushers

- ATL – Michael Turner – 15 rushes, 41 yards
- NYG – Brandon Jacobs – 14 rushes, 92 yards

Top receivers

- ATL – Julio Jones – 7 receptions, 64 yards
- NYG – Hakeem Nicks – 6 receptions, 115 yards, 2 TD

The Falcons lost their Wild Card round playoff game to the New York Giants on January 8, 2012, by a score of 24–2. It is the first time in NFL playoff history that a team has scored exactly two points. The previous NFL team to score only a safety in a game was the 1993 Cincinnati Bengals in Week 15 against the New England Patriots.
