= 2009 Atlanta Falcons season =

NFL team season

- Owner: Arthur Blank
- General manager: Thomas Dimitroff
- Head coach: Mike Smith
- Home stadium: Georgia Dome

Results
- Record: 9–7
- Division place: 2nd NFC South
- Playoffs: Did not qualify
- Pro Bowlers: WR Roddy White

Uniform
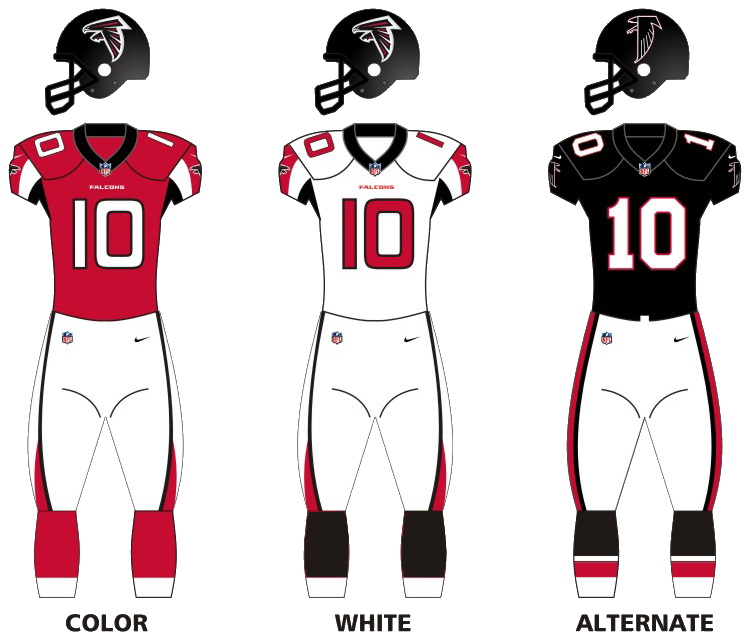

The 2009 Atlanta Falcons season was the 44th season for the team in the National Football League (NFL). The team looked to match or improve upon their 11–5 record from 2008 and return to the playoffs, however, the Falcons were eliminated from contention in Week 15 for the first time since 2007, after the Dallas Cowboys upset the New Orleans Saints. Despite not making the playoffs, the team, with a record of 9–7, posted consecutive winning seasons for the first time in franchise history. The only Falcon this year to play in the Pro Bowl was Roddy White. He finished the game with 8 catches and 84 yards. In the first 5 games, the Falcons were 4–1. But, after that, they sagged, going 5–6.

== 2009 NFL draft ==
The 2009 NFL draft was held on April 25 and 26, 2009, at Radio City Music Hall in New York City. The Falcons selected eight players which included seven players on the defensive side of the ball. The Falcons also made a trade with the Dallas Cowboys, giving the Cowboys their fifth round (143rd overall) pick in exchange for Dallas’ fifth (156th overall) and seventh round (210th overall) selections. With the 24th selection in the first round, the Falcons selected defensive tackle and All-SEC performer Peria Jerry from Ole Miss to continue to beef up the line. Highly regarded, hard hitting safety William Moore from Missouri was chosen in the second round and speedy corner Christopher Owens of San Jose State was the Falcons’ third round choice. Rounding out the draft were defensive end Lawrence Sidbury of Richmond(fourth round), cornerback William Middleton from Furman (fifth round), tackle Garrett Reynolds of North Carolina(fifth round), linebacker Spencer Adkins from Miami (sixth round), and local product defensive tackle Vance Walker from Georgia Tech Yellow Jackets football (seventh round).

2009 Atlanta Falcons draft
Round	Pick	Player	Position	College	Notes
1	24	Peria Jerry	DT	Ole Miss	
2	55	William Moore	S	Missouri	
3	90	Christopher Owens	CB	San Jose State	
4	125	Lawrence Sidbury	DE	Richmond	
5	138	William Middleton	CB	Furman	from St. Louis
5	156	Garrett Reynolds	T	North Carolina	from Dallas
6	176	Spencer Adkins	LB	Miami (FL)	from St. Louis
7	210	Vance Walker	DT	Georgia Tech	from Detroit via Dallas
Made roster

== Staff ==
2009 Atlanta Falcons staff
Front office: Owner/chief executive officer – Arthur Blank; President – Rich McKay; General manager – Thomas Dimitroff; Director of football administration – Nick Polk; Director of pro personnel – Les Snead; Assistant director of player personnel – Lionel Vital; Director of college scouting – David Caldwell; Head coaches: Head coach – Mike Smith; Assistant head coach/secondary – Emmitt Thomas; Assistant to the head coach – Andrew Weidinger; Offensive coaches: Offensive coordinator – Mike Mularkey; Quarterbacks – Bill Musgrave; Running backs – Gerald Brown; Wide receivers – Terry Robiskie; Tight ends – Chris Scelfo; Offensive line – Paul T. Boudreau; Assistant offensive line – Paul Dunn; Offensive assistant – Glenn Thomas	Defensive coaches: Defensive coordinator – Brian VanGorder; Defensive line – Ray Hamilton; Linebackers – Glenn Pires; Defensive backs – Alvin Reynolds; Defensive assistant – Joe Danna; Special teams coaches: Special teams coordinator – Keith Armstrong; Assistant special teams – Eric Sutulovich; Strength and conditioning: Director of athletic performance – Jeff Fish; Assistant strength and conditioning – Bill Hughan; Assistant strength and conditioning – Jonas Beauchemin

== Final roster ==
2009 Atlanta Falcons roster
Quarterbacks (QB): 8 Chris Redman; 2 Matt Ryan; 4 John Parker Wilson; Running backs (RB): 36 Verron Haynes; 34 Ovie Mughelli FB; 32 Jerious Norwood; 44 Jason Snelling; 30 Aaron Stecker; 33 Michael Turner; Wide receivers (WR): 11 Troy Bergeron; 80 Marty Booker; 12 Michael Jenkins; 14 Eric Weems RS; 84 Roddy White; Tight ends (TE): 88 Tony Gonzalez; 87 Justin Peelle; 85 Jason Rader; 89 Keith Zinger	Offensive linemen (OL): 72 Sam Baker T; 63 Justin Blalock G; 77 Tyson Clabo T; 62 Todd McClure C; 76 Quinn Ojinnaka G; 75 Garrett Reynolds G/T; 66 Brett Romberg C; 74 Will Svitek T; Defensive linemen (DL): 55 John Abraham DE; 98 Jamaal Anderson DE; 95 Jonathan Babineaux DT; 71 Kroy Biermann DE; 92 Chauncey Davis DE; 93 Thomas Johnson DT; 97 Trey Lewis DT; 90 Lawrence Sidbury DE; 99 Vance Walker DT	Linebackers (LB): 59 Spencer Adkins OLB; 45 Robert James MLB; 50 Curtis Lofton MLB; 54 Stephen Nicholas OLB; 53 Mike Peterson OLB; 52 Coy Wire OLB; Defensive backs (DB): 42 Eric Brock FS; 26 Erik Coleman SS; 28 Thomas DeCoud FS; 20 Brent Grimes CB; 24 Tye Hill CB; 22 Chevis Jackson CB; 21 Chris Owens CB; 38 Charlie Peprah SS; Special teams (ST): 3 Matt Bryant K; 6 Stephen Hauschka K; 9 Michael Koenen P; 82 Joe Zelenka LS	Practice squad: 5 Danny Baugher P; 67 Rob Bruggeman C (IR); 91 Maurice Lucas DE; 69 Blake Schlueter C; 37 Glenn Sharpe CB (IR); 1 D. J. Shockley QB; 35 Antone Smith RB; 15 Andy Strickland WR; 16 James Swinton WR; 65 Jose Valdez G; Reserve: 73 Harvey Dahl G (IR); 83 Harry Douglas WR (IR); 86 Brian Finneran WR (IR); 27 Jamaal Fudge S (IR); 51 Tony Gilbert LB (IR); 41 Antoine Harris S (IR); 23 Chris Houston CB (IR); 94 Peria Jerry DT (IR); 25 William Moore S (IR); 46 Mike Schneck LS (IR); 29 Brian Williams CB (IR); Rookies in italics 53 active, 13 reserve, 8 practice squad

== Schedule ==
=== Preseason ===
Week	Date	Opponent	Result	Record	Game site	NFL.com recap
1	August 15	at Detroit Lions	L 26–27	0–1	Ford Field	Recap
2	August 21	at St. Louis Rams	W 20–13	1–1	Edward Jones Dome	Recap
3	August 29	San Diego Chargers	W 27–24	2–1	Georgia Dome	Recap
4	September 3	Baltimore Ravens	L 3–20	2–2	Georgia Dome	Recap

=== Regular season ===
The Falcons' regular season schedule was released on April 14, 2009.

Week	Date	Opponent	Result	Record	Game site	NFL.com recap
1	September 13	Miami Dolphins	W 19–7	1–0	Georgia Dome	Recap
2	September 20	Carolina Panthers	W 28–20	2–0	Georgia Dome	Recap
3	September 27	at New England Patriots	L 10–26	2–1	Gillette Stadium	Recap
4	Bye					
5	October 11	at San Francisco 49ers	W 45–10	3–1	Candlestick Park	Recap
6	October 18	Chicago Bears	W 21–14	4–1	Georgia Dome	Recap
7	October 25	at Dallas Cowboys	L 21–37	4–2	Cowboys Stadium	Recap
8	November 2	at New Orleans Saints	L 27–35	4–3	Louisiana Superdome	Recap
9	November 8	Washington Redskins	W 31–17	5–3	Georgia Dome	Recap
10	November 15	at Carolina Panthers	L 19–28	5–4	Bank of America Stadium	Recap
11	November 22	at New York Giants	L 31–34 (OT)	5–5	Giants Stadium	Recap
12	November 29	Tampa Bay Buccaneers	W 20–17	6–5	Georgia Dome	Recap
13	December 6	Philadelphia Eagles	L 7–34	6–6	Georgia Dome	Recap
14	December 13	New Orleans Saints	L 23–26	6–7	Georgia Dome	Recap
15	December 20	at New York Jets	W 10–7	7–7	Giants Stadium	Recap
16	December 27	Buffalo Bills	W 31–3	8–7	Georgia Dome	Recap
17	January 3	at Tampa Bay Buccaneers	W 20–10	9–7	Raymond James Stadium	Recap

== Standings ==
NFC South
	W	L	T	PCT	DIV	CONF	PF	PA	STK
^{(1)} New Orleans Saints	13	3	0	.813	4–2	9–3	510	341	L3
Atlanta Falcons	9	7	0	.563	3–3	6–6	363	325	W3
Carolina Panthers	8	8	0	.500	4–2	8–4	315	308	W3
Tampa Bay Buccaneers	3	13	0	.188	1–5	3–9	244	400	L1

== Regular season results ==
=== Week 1: vs. Miami Dolphins ===
Quarter	1	2	3	4	Total
Dolphins	0	0	0	7	7
Falcons	0	10	6	3	19

at Georgia Dome, Atlanta, Georgia

- Game time: 1:00 PM EDT
- Game weather: None (Domed Stadium)
- Game attendance: 67,606
- Referee: Walt Coleman
- TV announcers (CBS): Greg Gumbel & Dan Dierdorf

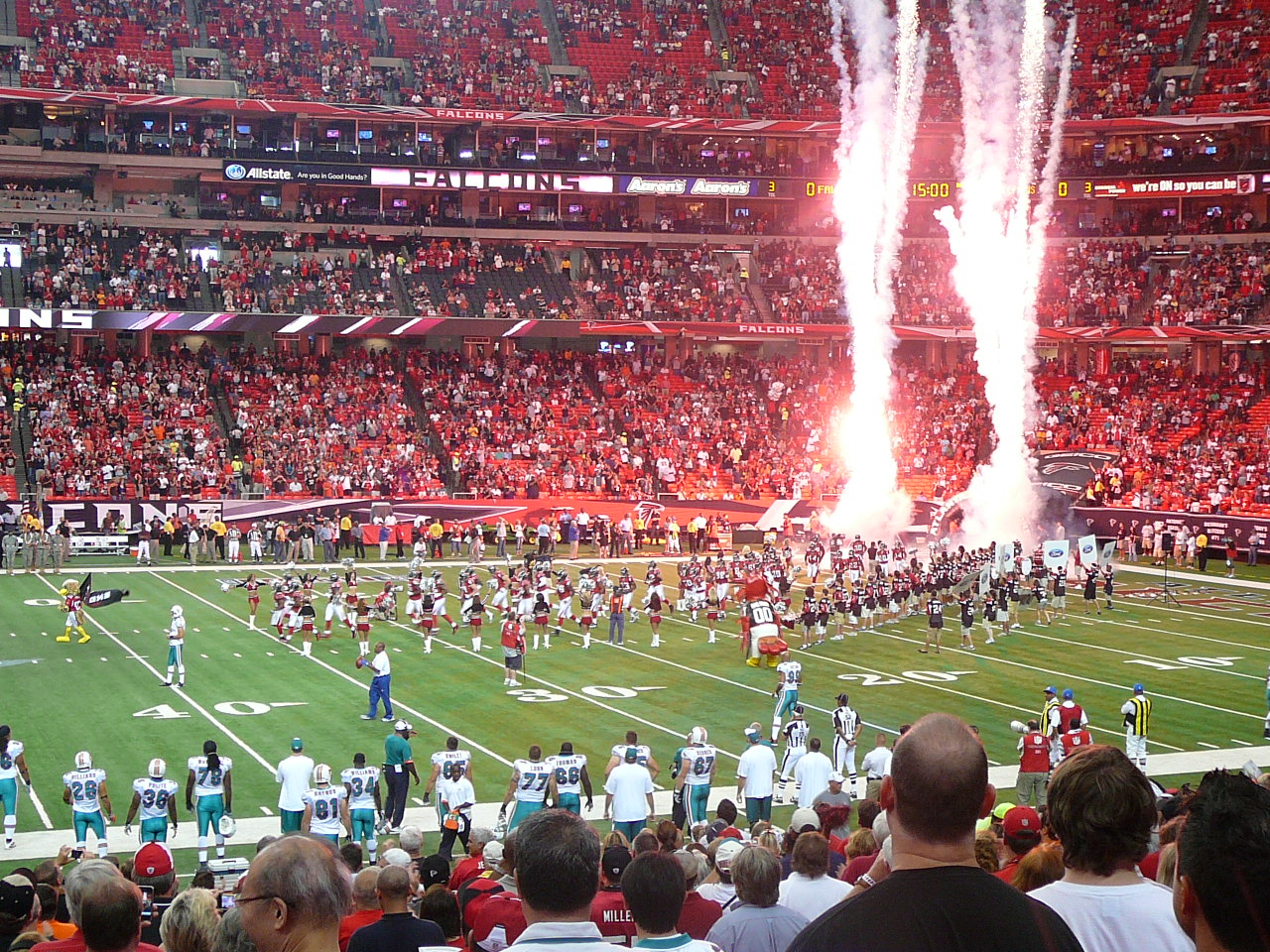
Falcons players running onto the field before their 2009 season opener against the Miami Dolphins.

The Falcons began their season at home in an inter-conference battle with the Miami Dolphins. After a scoreless first quarter, Atlanta took off in the second quarter as quarterback Matt Ryan completed a 1-yard touchdown pass to fullback Ovie Mughelli, followed by kicker Jason Elam making a 36-yard field goal. In the third quarter, the Falcons continued their stellar play as Ryan completed a 20-yard touchdown pass to tight end Tony Gonzalez (with a failed PAT). Atlanta concluded its game in the fourth quarter as Elam nailed a 50-yard field goal. Afterwards, the Dolphins got their only score as quarterback Chad Pennington completed a 9-yard touchdown pass to running back Ricky Williams.

With the win, the Falcons began their season at 1–0.

Tony Gonzalez (5 receptions, 73 yards, and a TD) became the 21st player in NFL history to collect 11,000 career receiving yards.

=== Week 2: vs. Carolina Panthers ===
Quarter	1	2	3	4	Total
Panthers	3	10	0	7	20
Falcons	7	14	0	7	28

at Georgia Dome, Atlanta, Georgia

- Game time: 1:00 PM EDT
- Game weather: None (Domed Stadium)
- Game attendance: 67,313
- Referee: Don Carey
- TV announcers (Fox): Dick Stockton and Charles Davis

Coming off their win over the Dolphins, the Falcons stayed at home, donned their throwback uniforms, and prepared for a Week 2 NFC South showdown against the Carolina Panthers. Atlanta trailed early in the first quarter as Panthers kicker John Kasay got a 38-yard field goal. Afterwards, the Falcons answered with quarterback Matt Ryan completing a 24-yard touchdown pass to tight end Tony Gonzalez. In the second quarter, Carolina replied with running back DeAngelo Williams getting a 3-yard touchdown run. Atlanta struck back as Ryan completed a 10-yard touchdown pass to fullback Jason Snelling. The Panthers crept close as Kasay nailed a 50-yard field goal, yet the Falcons increased their lead prior to halftime as Ryan completed a 7-yard touchdown pass to wide receiver Roddy White. After a scoreless third quarter, Atlanta got some distance from Carolina as running back Michael Turner got a 1-yard touchdown run. Afterwards, Carolina mustered an 11-yard touchdown pass from quarterback Jake Delhomme to tight end Dante Rosario. On another Panthers possession, Delhomme threw an interception to cornerback Chris Houston. After yet another possession, with time running out, the Panthers tried to rally as Delhomme threw a deep desperation pass, but it resulted incomplete as cornerback Brent Grimes batted it down.

With the win, the Falcons improved to 2–0.

=== Week 3: at New England Patriots ===
Quarter	1	2	3	4	Total
Falcons	3	7	0	0	10
Patriots	3	10	3	10	26

at Gillette Stadium, Foxborough, Massachusetts

- Game time: 1:00 p.m. EDT
- Game weather: 62 °F (17 °C) (Rainy)
- Game attendance: 68,756
- Referee: Alberto Riveron
- TV announcers (Fox): Joe Buck, Troy Aikman, and Pam Oliver

Coming off a successful two-game home stand, the Falcons flew to Gillette Stadium for a Week 3 inter-conference battle with the New England Patriots. Atlanta led early with a 26-yard field goal from Jason Elam, but the Patriots tied the game with a 21-yard field goal from kicker Stephen Gostkowski. New England took the lead in the second quarter with running back Fred Taylor's 8-yard touchdown run, yet the Falcons answered with running back Michael Turner's 2-yard touchdown run. New England closed out the half with Gostkowski's 33-yard field goal.

The entire second half was completely dominated by the Patriots. Gostkowski nailed a 22-yard field goal in the third quarter and a 33-yard field goal in the fourth quarter, while quarterback Tom Brady closed out the game with a 36-yard touchdown pass to tight end Chris Baker.

With their third loss to New England since 2001, the Falcons went into their bye week at 2–1.

=== Week 5: at San Francisco 49ers ===
Quarter	1	2	3	4	Total
Falcons	14	21	3	7	45
49ers	7	3	0	0	10

at Candlestick Park, San Francisco, California

- Game time: 4:05 PM EDT
- Game weather: 58 °F (14 °C) (Overcast)
- Game attendance: 69,732
- Referee: Pete Morelli
- TV announcers (Fox): Kenny Albert, Daryl Johnston, & Tony Siragusa

Coming off their bye week, the Falcons flew to Candlestick Park for a Week 5 duel with the San Francisco 49ers. Atlanta took off in the first quarter with running back Michael Turner's 7-yard touchdown run, followed by quarterback Matt Ryan hooking up with wide receiver Roddy White on a 31-yard touchdown pass. The 49ers answered with running back Glen Coffee getting a 2-yard touchdown run. San Francisco started the second quarter with kicker Joe Nedney making a 39-yard field goal, but the Falcons began to soar. It started with Ryan's 90-yard touchdown pass to White and concluded with Turner's 3-yard and 1-yard touchdown runs. Atlanta closed out the game with kicker Jason Elam's 40-yard field goal in the third quarter and Ryan's 1-yard touchdown run in the fourth.

With the win, the Falcons improved to 3–1.

Atlanta's 35 first-half points was the most in franchise history.

=== Week 6: vs. Chicago Bears ===
Quarter	1	2	3	4	Total
Bears	0	7	0	7	14
Falcons	0	14	0	7	21

at Georgia Dome, Atlanta, Georgia

- Game time: 8:20 PM EDT
- Game weather: None (Domed Stadium)
- Game attendance: 68,082
- Referee: Terry McAulay
- TV announcers (NBC): Al Michaels, Cris Collinsworth and Andrea Kremer

Coming off their impressive road win over the 49ers, the Falcons went home for a Week 6 Sunday night duel with the Chicago Bears. After a scoreless first quarter, Atlanta trailed early in the second quarter as Bears quarterback Jay Cutler found wide receiver Johnny Knox on a 23-yard touchdown pass. Afterwards, the Falcons took the lead as quarterback Matt Ryan completed a 40-yard touchdown pass to wide receiver Roddy White and a 10-yard touchdown pass to tight end Tony Gonzalez.

After a scoreless third quarter, Chicago tied the game in the fourth quarter with Cutler hooking up with tight end Greg Olsen on a 2-yard touchdown. Atlanta regained the lead as running back Michael Turner got a 5-yard touchdown run. Afterwards, the defense fended off a last-second Bears drive to lock up the victory.

With the win, the Falcons improved to 4–1.

=== Week 7: at Dallas Cowboys ===
Quarter	1	2	3	4	Total
Falcons	7	0	7	7	21
Cowboys	0	17	7	13	37

at Cowboys Stadium, Arlington, Texas

- Game time: 4:15 PM EDT
- Game weather: None (Dome Closed)
- Game attendance: 81,521
- Referee: Scott Green
- TV announcers (Fox): Thom Brennaman, Troy Aikman, & Pam Oliver

Coming off their Sunday night home win over the Bears, the Falcons flew to Cowboys Stadium for a Week 7 duel with the Dallas Cowboys. In the first quarter, Atlanta took flight as quarterback Matt Ryan hooked up with wide receiver Roddy White on a 4-yard touchdown pass. The Cowboys took the lead in the second quarter with kicker Nick Folk nailing a 38-yard field goal, followed by quarterback Tony Romo completing a 59-yard touchdown pass to wide receiver Miles Austin and a 5-yard touchdown pass to wide receiver Patrick Crayton.

In the third quarter, the Falcons answered with running back Michael Turner got a 2-yard touchdown. However, Dallas came right back with Romo finding Austin again on a 22-yard touchdown pass. The Cowboys increased their lead in the fourth quarter with Folk booting a 46-yard field goal, followed by Crayton returning a punt 73 yards for a touchdown. Atlanta tried to come back as Ryan completed a 30-yard touchdown pass to wide receiver Eric Weems, but the Cowboys closed out the game with Folk's 34-yard field goal.

With the loss, the Falcons fell to 4–2.

=== Week 8: at New Orleans Saints ===
Quarter	1	2	3	4	Total
Falcons	14	0	7	6	27
Saints	7	21	0	7	35

at Louisiana Superdome, New Orleans, Louisiana

- Game time: 8:30 PM EST
- Game weather: None (Domed Stadium)
- Game attendance: 70,088
- Referee: Jeff Triplette
- TV announcers (ESPN): Mike Tirico, Ron Jaworski & Jon Gruden

Hoping to rebound from their road loss to the Cowboys, the Falcons flew to the Louisiana Superdome for a Week 8 NFC South showdown against the undefeated New Orleans Saints on Monday night. Atlanta took flight in the first quarter as running back Michael Turner capped off the game's opening drive with a 13-yard touchdown run. The Saints responded by capping off their opening drive with a 22-yard touchdown run from running back Pierre Thomas. Afterwards, the Falcons regained the lead with free safety Thomas DeCoud sacking quarterback Drew Brees, which caused Brees to fumble the ball, allowing defensive end Kroy Biermann to pick the ball up and run 4 yards for a touchdown. However, New Orleans exploded with points in the second quarter as Brees hooked up with wide receiver Marques Colston on an 18-yard touchdown pass, running back Reggie Bush getting a 1-yard touchdown run, and cornerback Jabari Greer returning an interception 48 yards for a touchdown.

Atlanta started to rally in the third quarter as quarterback Matt Ryan completed a 68-yard touchdown pass to wide receiver Roddy White, followed by a 25-yard field goal from kicker Jason Elam. However, the Saints answered with Brees connecting with Thomas on a 1-yard touchdown pass. The Falcons tried to come back as Elam booted a 40-yard field goal, but an interception from free safety Darren Sharper ended any hope of a rally.

With the tough loss, Atlanta fell to 4–3.

This marked the first time in the Mike Smith/Matt Ryan era that the Falcons suffered consecutive losses.

=== Week 9: vs. Washington Redskins ===
Quarter	1	2	3	4	Total
Redskins	0	3	7	7	17
Falcons	14	10	0	7	31

at Georgia Dome, Atlanta, Georgia

- Game time: 1:00 PM EST
- Game weather: None (Domed Stadium)
- Game attendance: 67,982
- Referee: Ron Winter
- TV announcers (Fox): Kenny Albert, Daryl Johnston & Tony Siragusa

Hoping to snap a two-game losing streak, the Falcons went home for a Week 9 duel with the Washington Redskins. Atlanta took flight in the first quarter as quarterback Matt Ryan completed a 2-yard touchdown pass to tight end Tony Gonzalez, followed by cornerback Tye Hill returning an interception 62 yards for a touchdown. The Redskins answered in the second quarter as kicker Shaun Suisham nailed a 48-yard field goal, yet the Falcons kept their attack on as running back Michael Turner got a 30-yard touchdown run, followed by kicker Jason Elam booting a 33-yard field goal.

Washington began to rally in the third quarter with a 1-yard touchdown run from running back Ladell Betts. The Redskins came closer in the fourth quarter as quarterback Jason Campbell hooked up with tight end Todd Yoder on a 3-yard touchdown pass, yet Atlanta closed out the game with Turner's 58-yard touchdown run.

With the win, the Falcons improved to 5–3.

=== Week 10: at Carolina Panthers ===
Quarter	1	2	3	4	Total
Falcons	3	7	3	6	19
Panthers	7	14	0	7	28

at Bank of America Stadium, Charlotte, North Carolina

- Game time: 1:00 PM EST
- Game weather: 73 °F (23 °C) (Sunny)
- Game attendance: 73,239
- Referee: Bill Leavy
- TV announcers (Fox): Kenny Albert, Daryl Johnston & Tony Siragusa

Coming off their home win over the Redskins, the Falcons flew to Bank of America Stadium for a Week 10 NFC South rematch against the Carolina Panthers. Atlanta began to fly in the first quarter as kicker Jason Elam nailed a 35-yard field goal, but the Panthers replied with a 1-yard touchdown run from running back Jonathan Stewart. Carolina extended their lead in the second quarter with quarterback Jake Delhomme completing a 4-yard touchdown pass to wide receiver Steve Smith, yet the Falcons answered as fullback Jason Snelling got a 1-yard touchdown run. The Panthers closed out the half with Delhomme hooking up with Smith again on a 4-yard touchdown pass.

In the second half, Atlanta worked their way back into the game as Elam booted a 24-yard field goal in the third quarter, followed by quarterback Matt Ryan finding tight end Justin Peelle on a 3-yard touchdown pass in the fourth quarter (with a failed 2-point conversion). However, Carolina closed out the win with Stewart's 45-yard touchdown run, getting their revenge.

With the loss, the Falcons fell to 5–4.

=== Week 11: at New York Giants ===
Quarter	1	2	3	4	OT	Total
Falcons	0	7	10	14	0	31
Giants	3	14	7	7	3	34

at Giants Stadium, East Rutherford, New Jersey

- Game time: 1:00 PM EST
- Game weather: 53 °F (12 °C) (Sunny)
- Game attendance: 78,491
- Referee: Gene Steratore
- TV announcers (Fox): Kenny Albert, Daryl Johnston & Tony Siragusa

Hoping to rebound from a loss against the rival Panthers, the Falcons flew to Giants Stadium for a Week 11 duel with the New York Giants.

In the first quarter, the Falcons trailed early with kicker Lawrence Tynes making a 39-yard field goal. In the second quarter the Falcons came on top with fullback Jason Snelling getting a 7-yard touchdown run, until they fell behind with quarterback Eli Manning hooking up with tight end Kevin Boss on a 4 and a 28-yard touchdown pass. In the third quarter, fullback Jason Snelling got a 1-yard touchdown run for the Falcons. The Giants made it a 2-possession game with running back Brandon Jacobs getting a 2-yard touchdown run, until the Falcons replied with kicker Jason Elam making a 25-yard field goal. The Giants tried to pull away in the fourth quarter with Manning passing to fullback Madison Hedgecock 3 yards for a touchdown, until the Falcons stepped up to tie the game with quarterback Matt Ryan completing a 4-yard touchdown pass to wide receiver Eric Weems, then found tight end Tony Gonzalez on an 11-yard touchdown pass. At overtime, the Falcons lost the game with kicker Lawrence Tynes getting the game-winning field goal from 36 yards away.

With the loss, the Falcons fell to 5–5.

=== Week 12: vs. Tampa Bay Buccaneers ===
Quarter	1	2	3	4	Total
Buccaneers	0	10	7	0	17
Falcons	0	10	3	7	20

at Georgia Dome, Atlanta, Georgia

- Game time: 1:00 PM EST
- Game weather: None (Domed Stadium)
- Game attendance: 67,029
- Referee: Walt Anderson
- TV announcers (Fox): Dick Stockton, Charles Davis & Laura Okmin

Hoping to rebound from their loss against the Giants, the Falcons went home, re-donned their throwback uniforms, and prepared for an NFC South showdown against the Tampa Bay Buccaneers. In the first quarter, things looked bad as Matt Ryan was sacked, injured his toe, and got taken out of the game as his back-up Chris Redman got on the field. In the second quarter, the Falcons drew first blood as kicker Jason Elam nailed a 45-yard field goal. Atlanta extended their lead as Redman threw a shovel pass to Jerious Norwood for a 22-yard touchdown. Tampa Bay responded with Josh Freeman's 42-yard touchdown pass to Antonio Bryant and tied the game at halftime with Connor Barth's 39-yard field goal. In the third quarter, Bucs safety Corey Lynch blocked a Falcons punt, which set Freeman up for an 8-yard touchdown pass to running back Carnell Williams to take the lead. The Falcons struck back as Elam nailed a 37-yard field goal. In the fourth quarter, Bucs punter Dirk Johnson faked a play which was backfired. Several plays later, Elam attempted a 43-yard field goal, but he missed as it went too much to the left. The same happened with Bucs kicker Barth as he missed a 51-yard field goal attempt. Atlanta was facing fourth and goal with 26 seconds remaining and no timeouts left, as Redman connected with Roddy White for a 5-yard touchdown pass.

With the win, the Falcons improved to 6–5. It was later revealed that Matt Ryan was out for several weeks.

=== Week 13: vs. Philadelphia Eagles ===
Quarter	1	2	3	4	Total
Eagles	10	3	14	7	34
Falcons	0	0	0	7	7

at Georgia Dome, Atlanta, Georgia

- Game time: 1:00 PM EST
- Game weather: None (Domed Stadium)
- Game attendance: 69,560
- Referee: Ed Hochuli
- TV announcers (Fox): Kenny Albert, Daryl Johnston & Tony Siragusa

Coming off a relief home win against their rival Tampa Bay, the Falcons stayed home and got set for a Week 13 duel with the Philadelphia Eagles. Due to Matt Ryan's toe injury against the Bucs, Chris Redman was set to start. The Falcons trailed early as Eagles kicker David Akers made a 33-yard field goal. After that, Eagles quarterback Donovan McNabb connected with Leonard Weaver for a 4-yard touchdown pass. In the second quarter, the Eagles extended their lead with another 33-yard field goal from David Akers. In the third quarter, things got uglier for the Falcons as their former quarterback Michael Vick rushed 5 yards for a touchdown. The Falcons got the ball back, only for Redman to throw an interception to Eagles cornerback Sheldon Brown, which he took 83 yards for a defensive touchdown. In the fourth quarter, Vick threw a 5-yard touchdown pass to Eagles tight end Brent Celek. With time already running out, Redman threw a last second 3-yard touchdown pass to Roddy White, avoiding a shutout.

With the loss, the Falcons fell to 6–6.

=== Week 14: vs. New Orleans Saints ===
Quarter	1	2	3	4	Total
Saints	3	13	7	3	26
Falcons	6	3	7	7	23

at Georgia Dome, Atlanta, Georgia

- Game time: 1:00 PM EST
- Game weather: None (Domed Stadium)
- Game attendance: 68,930
- Referee: Tony Corrente
- TV announcers (Fox): Joe Buck, & Troy Aikman & Pam Oliver

Hoping to rebound from their disappointing home loss against the Eagles, the Falcons remained at home and prepared for an NFC South rematch against the undefeated New Orleans Saints, with Matt Ryan still injured. In the first quarter, the Falcons drew first blood as kicker Matt Bryant nailed a 36-yard field goal. The Saints tied the game with kicker Garrett Hartley nailing a 33-yard field goal. The Falcons closed the first quarter with Bryant nailing a 30-yard field goal. In the second quarter, Saints quarterback Drew Brees connected with running back Reggie Bush for a 6-yard touchdown pass. The Saints extended their lead as Brees connected with Marques Colston for a 3-yard touchdown pass (with a failed PAT). The Falcons closed out the first half as Bryant nailed a 27-yard field goal. In the third quarter, Reggie Bush took a 21-yard touchdown pass from Brees to extend the Saints' lead even more. The Falcons got their first touchdown of the game as Redman connected with Michael Jenkins for a 50-yard touchdown pass. In the fourth quarter, Jason Snelling got 4-yard touchdown run to tie the game, giving Atlanta some hope. Hartley gave the Saints the lead as he made a 38-yard field goal. After Saints linebacker Jonathan Vilma intercepted Redman's pass, the Saints attempted yet another field goal, which was a fake that resulted in an incomplete pass. The Falcons faced fourth and 2 at the 49-yard line with less than 2 minutes, where Redman completed a pass to Snelling, but Vilma stopped him at the line of scrimmage.

With the loss, the Falcons fell to 6–7.

=== Week 15: at New York Jets ===
Quarter	1	2	3	4	Total
Falcons	3	0	0	7	10
Jets	7	0	0	0	7

at Giants Stadium, East Rutherford, New Jersey

- Game time: 1:00 PM EST
- Game weather: 29 °F (−2 °C)
- Referee: Ron Winter
- TV announcers (Fox): Dick Stockton & Charles Davis

Having already been eliminated from playoff contention because the Cowboys upset the Saints the day before, the Falcons flew a second time to Giants Stadium for a Week 15 inter-conference battle with the New York Jets; Matt Ryan returned from his toe injury. In the first quarter, Atlanta drew first score with Matt Bryant kicking a 24-yard field goal. The Jets took the lead with Mark Sanchez launching a 67-yard touchdown pass to wide receiver Braylon Edwards. The second quarter remained scoreless as the Jets attempted a 19-yard field goal, but Kellen Clemens fumbled the ball, causing him to get tackled by Brent Grimes. After yet another scoreless quarter (third), the Jets attempted a 37-yard field goal, but it was blocked by Chauncey Davis. The Falcons, with one last chance, made a late fourth and goal play, where Ryan hooked up with Tony Gonzalez for a 6-yard touchdown pass. New York got the ball back, but Brent Grimes' interception sealed the win for Atlanta.

With the win, the Falcons improved to 7–7 and ended a two-game losing streak.

=== Week 16: vs. Buffalo Bills ===
Quarter	1	2	3	4	Total
Bills	0	0	3	0	3
Falcons	7	3	14	7	31

at Georgia Dome, Atlanta, Georgia

- Game time: 1:00 PM EST
- Game weather: none (domed stadium)
- Referee: Bill Leavy
- TV announcers (CBS): Bill Macatee & Steve Beuerlein

After a close call against the Jets, the Falcons went home for a Week 16 inter-conference battle with the Buffalo Bills. In the first quarter, the Falcons got straight to work as Matt Ryan completed a 42-yard touchdown pass to Roddy White. In the second quarter, Matt Bryant's 51-yard field goal extended the lead for Atlanta. As the first half was closing, Buffalo blocked Atlanta's field goal and things got crazy as a couple of Bills possessed the ball, but they could not manage to get it into the end zone. In the third quarter, Atlanta extended their lead even more as Marty Booker caught a 12-yard touchdown pass from Ryan. Things got better for the Falcons as Buffalo running back Fred Jackson fumbled the ball, which led Lawrence Sidbury to return it for an 11-yard defensive touchdown as he dragged a few Buffalo players. The Bills finally got on the board as kicker Rian Lindell nailed a 42-yard field goal. In the fourth quarter, Ryan re-connected with White for a 5-yard touchdown pass, as it was too late for the Bills to catch up.

With the win, the Falcons improved to 8–7.

=== Week 17: at Tampa Bay Buccaneers ===
Quarter	1	2	3	4	Total
Falcons	0	10	0	10	20
Buccaneers	3	0	0	7	10

at Raymond James Stadium, Tampa, Florida

- Game time: 1:00 PM EST
- Game weather: 44 °F (7 °C), Cloudy
- Referee: Gene Steratore
- TV announcers (Fox): Dick Stockton & Charles Davis

Coming off their home win against the Bills, the Falcons flew to Raymond James Stadium for a Week 17 NFC South rematch against the Tampa Bay Buccaneers. In the opening kickoff, Falcon Eric Weems fumbled the football, causing the Bucs to recover, which set up Connor Barth for a 48-yard field goal. In the second quarter, the Falcons responded by taking the lead with Matt Bryant's 36-yard field goal, followed by Matt Ryan's 2-yard touchdown pass to Justin Peele. After a scoreless third quarter, Tampa Bay tied the game with Josh Freeman's 8-yard touchdown pass to Antonio Bryant. Atlanta answered back as Ryan threw a 12-yard touchdown pass to Roddy White. After another possession, the Falcons sealed the deal with Bryant's second 36-yard field goal.

With the win, not only did the Falcons improve to 9–7, but they also posted back-to-back winning seasons for the first time in franchise history under head coach Mike Smith.

== Scores by quarter ==
	1	2	3	4	Total
Opponents	53	125	55	89	322
Falcons	78	116	64	109	367
