= Jason Snelling =

American football player (born 1983)

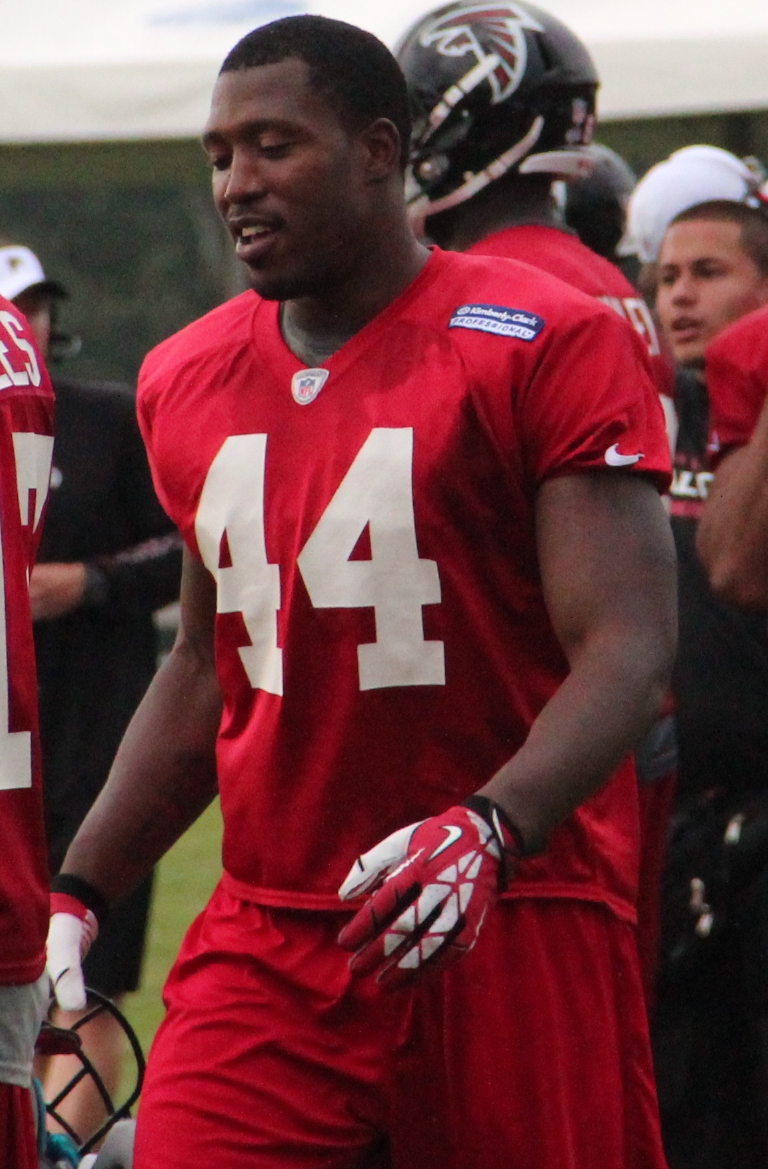
- Snelling with the Atlanta Falcons in 2013

No. 44
- Position: Fullback

Personal information
- Born: December 29, 1983 (age 42); Toms River, New Jersey, U.S.
- Listed height: 5 ft 11 in (1.80 m)
- Listed weight: 234 lb (106 kg)

Career information
- High school: Lloyd C. Bird (Chesterfield, Virginia)
- College: Virginia (2002–2006)
- NFL draft: 2007: 7th round, 244th overall pick

Career history
- Atlanta Falcons (2007–2013)

Career NFL statistics
- Rushing attempts: 363
- Rushing yards: 1,420
- Rushing touchdowns: 8
- Receptions: 168
- Receiving yards: 1,249
- Receiving touchdowns: 9
- Stats at Pro Football Reference

Jason Michael Snelling (born December 29, 1983) is an American former professional football player who was a running back who spent his entire career with the Atlanta Falcons of the National Football League (NFL). He was selected by the Falcons in the seventh round of the 2007 NFL draft. He played college football for the Virginia Cavaliers.

== Early life ==
Snelling played football at Lloyd C. Bird High School, where he was an all-district tailback and was named to the all-region team three times. He rushed for 3,300 yards during his career, including 1,444 yards and 14 touchdowns during his senior year. His jersey number was retired by the school in 2007

== College career ==
Snelling enrolled to University of Virginia . His average of 5.3 yards per rush is the fifth on the school's all-time rushing record list, topped only by John Papit (1947–50), Terry Kirby (1989–92), Barry Word (1982–85) and Nikki Fisher (1988–91). His 325 rushing yards in 2005 were the most by a Virginia fullback in a season since Charles Way totaled 517 yards in 1994, he also led the ACC fullbacks in rushing yards in 2005. Snelling was diagnosed with epilepsy, and the condition caused him to take a medical redshirt his sophomore season and later miss practices and games. His condition was eventually diagnosed and is now treated by medication. He was unable to talk openly about epilepsy until his senior season at Virginia.

== Professional career ==
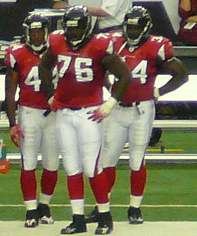
Snelling (left) with Quinn Ojinnaka and Ovie Mughelli in 2009

He was selected by the Falcons in the seventh round of the 2007 NFL draft (244th overall). He made his National Football League debut against the Tampa Bay Buccaneers and scored his first professional touchdown against the Arizona Cardinals. He started his first game November 22, 2009 against the New York Giants, rushing for 76 yards and 2 touchdowns on 25 carries, while also catching 3 passes for 13 yards. On January 3, 2010, he rushed 25 times for a career-high 147 yards and added three receptions for 21 yards in a victory against the Tampa Bay Buccaneers, helping the Falcons to the first back-to-back winning seasons in the franchise's 44-year history. Snelling was re-signed by the Falcons on April 15, 2010. He finished the 2009 season with 613 yards on 142 carries with 4 rushing touchdowns. He also caught 30 passes for 259 yards and 1 touchdown.

On March 4, 2014, Snelling announced his retirement from the NFL.

== NFL career statistics ==
Legend
**Bold**	Career high

=== Regular season ===
Year	Team	Games		Rushing					Receiving				
Year	Team	GP	GS	Att	Yds	Avg	Lng	TD	Rec	Yds	Avg	Lng	TD
2007	ATL	7	0	13	43	3.3	17	1	0	0	0.0	0	0
2008	ATL	**16**	1	15	62	4.1	13	0	8	89	**11.1**	27	0
2009	ATL	14	**2**	**142**	**613**	**4.3**	**31**	**4**	30	259	8.6	**38**	1
2010	ATL	14	0	87	324	3.7	30	2	**44**	**303**	6.9	28	**3**
2011	ATL	15	0	44	151	3.4	18	0	26	179	6.9	21	1
2012	ATL	**16**	**2**	18	63	3.5	11	0	31	203	6.5	16	1
2013	ATL	14	1	44	164	3.7	17	1	29	216	7.4	34	**3**
		96	6	363	1,420	3.9	31	8	168	1,249	7.4	38	9

=== Playoffs ===
Year	Team	Games		Rushing					Receiving				
Year	Team	GP	GS	Att	Yds	Avg	Lng	TD	Rec	Yds	Avg	Lng	TD
2008	ATL	1	0	0	0	0.0	0	0	0	0	0.0	0	0
2010	ATL	1	0	1	1	1.0	1	0	**2**	6	3.0	4	0
2011	ATL	1	0	**2**	7	3.5	6	0	**2**	9	4.5	**6**	0
2012	ATL	**2**	0	**2**	**12**	**6.0**	**12**	0	**2**	**10**	**5.0**	5	**1**
		5	0	5	20	4.0	12	0	6	25	4.2	6	1
