= Tony Gonzalez =

American football player (born 1976)

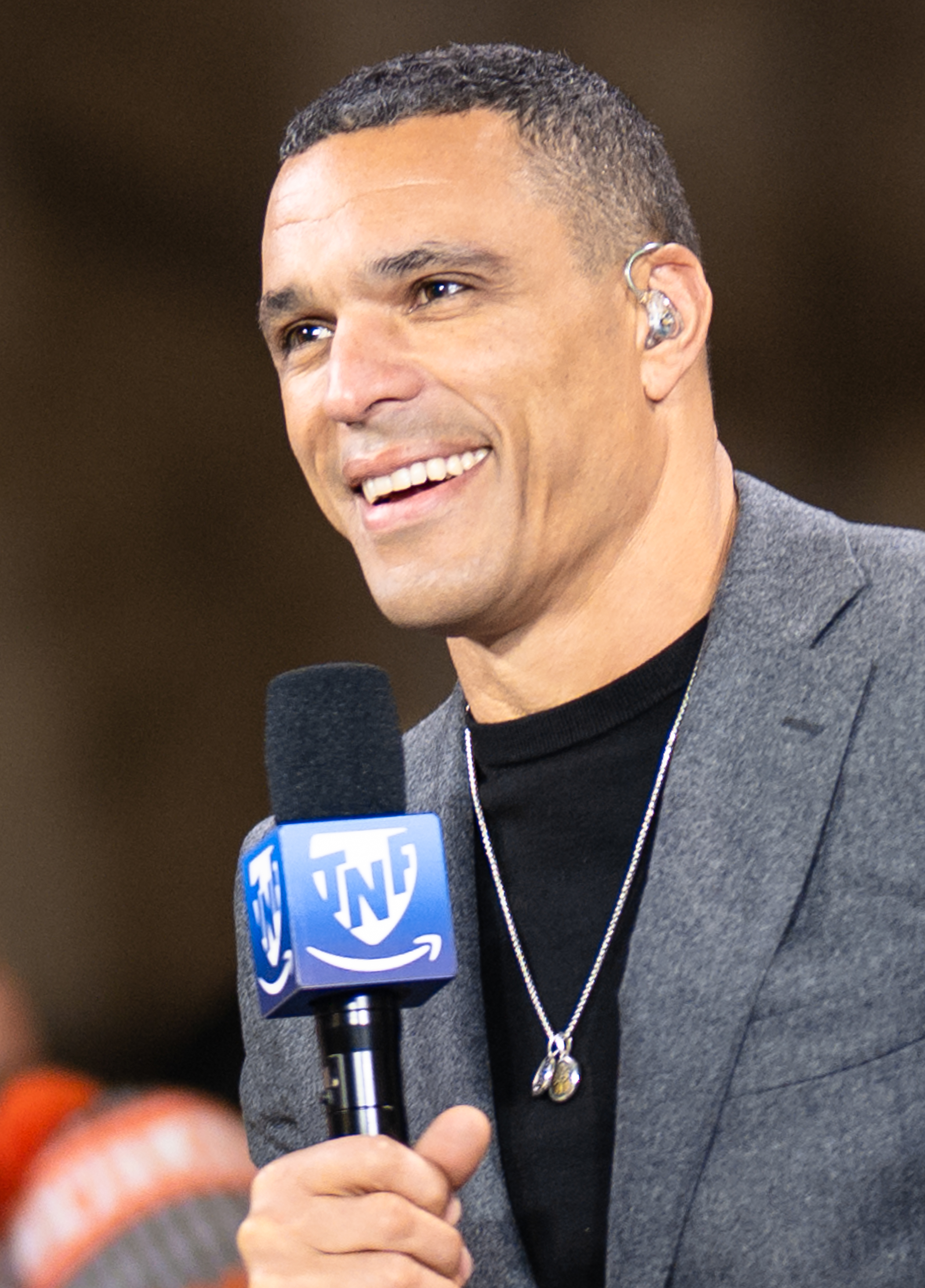
- Gonzalez in 2023

No. 88
- Position: Tight end

Personal information
- Born: February 27, 1976 (age 50); Torrance, California, U.S.
- Listed height: 6 ft 5 in (1.96 m)
- Listed weight: 247 lb (112 kg)

Career information
- High school: Huntington Beach (Huntington Beach, California)
- College: California (1994–1996)
- NFL draft: 1997: 1st round, 13th overall pick

Career history
- Kansas City Chiefs (1997–2008); Atlanta Falcons (2009–2013)

Awards and highlights
- 6× First-team All-Pro (1999–2001, 2003, 2008, 2012); 4× Second-team All-Pro (2002, 2004, 2006, 2007); 14× Pro Bowl (1999–2008, 2010–2013); NFL receptions leader (2004); NFL 2000s All-Decade Team; NFL 100th Anniversary All-Time Team; PFWA All-Rookie Team (1997); Kansas City Chiefs Hall of Fame; Consensus All-American (1996); First-team All-Pac-10 (1996); NFL records: Most career receiving yards by a tight end: 15,127; Most career receptions by a tight end: 1,325

Career NFL statistics
- Receptions: 1,325
- Receiving yards: 15,127
- Receiving touchdowns: 111
- Stats at Pro Football Reference
- Pro Football Hall of Fame

Anthony David Gonzalez (born February 27, 1976) is an American former professional football tight end who played in the National Football League (NFL) for 17 seasons. Gonzalez is the NFL leader in receptions and receiving yards by a tight end and ranks second in tight end receiving touchdowns. He is regarded as one of the greatest tight ends of all time.

Gonzalez played college football for the California Golden Bears, receiving consensus All-American honors in 1996. He was selected in the first round of the 1997 NFL draft by the Kansas City Chiefs, where he spent his first 12 seasons. In his last five seasons, Gonzalez was a member of the Atlanta Falcons. He earned 14 Pro Bowl selections and six first-team All-Pro selections during his career, both of which are records for a tight end. Gonzalez also appeared in 270 of 272 regular season games and lost only two fumbles on 1,327 touches. He was inducted to the Pro Football Hall of Fame in 2019.

== Early life ==
Gonzalez was born in Torrance, California. He was raised by his mother, who worked two jobs to support the family. His paternal grandfather, whose surname was "Gonçalves," had moved from Cape Verde to Argentina; he was of part Portuguese ancestry. His paternal grandmother was Jamaican, with part Scottish ancestry; and his mother's family is African-American, with mixed European roots. Gonzalez attended Huntington Beach High School in Huntington Beach, California, where he lettered in football and basketball.

As a senior, he caught 62 passes for 945 yards and 13 touchdowns and was a first-team All America selection at both tight end and linebacker. Playing basketball, he was named Orange County and Sunset League MVP as he averaged 26 points per game.

After his senior year, Gonzalez was named the Orange County High School Athlete of the Year, beating out athletes such as golfer Tiger Woods.

== College career ==
Gonzalez chose to attend the University of California, Berkeley, where he majored in communications and played both football and basketball. As a member of the California Golden Bears football team, he played tight end under future NFL coach Steve Mariucci. Gonzalez was also an All-Pac-10 and All-America selection.

Gonzalez also continued his basketball career at Cal. In his junior year, he played in 28 games, averaging 6.8 points and 5.4 rebounds per game as California made it to the Sweet Sixteen of the NCAA basketball tournament.

Eventually, Gonzalez had to choose a career between basketball or football. On the difficulty of the transition between the two, Tony said "you get done playing football and then you transition to basketball[, which] had already been going for a month", but ultimately "the decision was pretty much made for me..."

Gonzalez decided to forgo his final year of eligibility to declare for the NFL draft.

== Professional career ==
Pre-draft measurables
Height	Weight	Arm length	Hand span	40-yard dash	10-yard split	20-yard split	20-yard shuttle	Three-cone drill	Vertical jump	Broad jump
6 ft 4 1/8 in (1.93 m)	244 lb (111 kg)	35 1/8 in (0.89 m)	9 3/8 in (0.24 m)	4.83 s	1.68 s	2.83 s	4.06 s	7.75 s	33.5 in (0.85 m)	9 ft 8 in (2.95 m)

=== Kansas City Chiefs ===
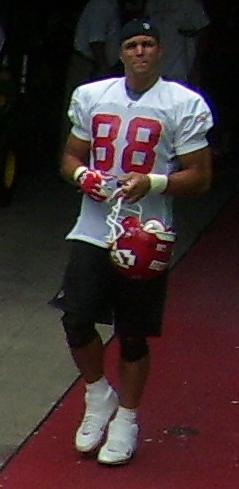
Gonzalez at a Chiefs mini camp practice in 2008

Gonzalez was ranked as one of the top tight ends in the 1997 NFL draft and was considered a top 15 selection. The Chiefs traded up from the 18th to the 13th selection with the Tennessee Oilers to draft Gonzalez.

Gonzalez began his career in the 1997 season. He finished his rookie season with 33 receptions, two touchdowns, and a blocked punt on special teams, helping the Chiefs to finish with the best record in the American Football Conference (AFC). He was named to the NFL All-Rookie Team for the 1997 season. In the 1998 season, Gonzalez saw dramatic improvements with 59 receptions for 621 yards, and he also caught two touchdown passes for the second (consecutive) year.

The 1999 season saw Gonzalez again improving when he caught 76 passes for 849 yards and a career-high 11 touchdown receptions, earning his first Pro Bowl selection. In addition, he was named as a First Team All-Pro. In week 14 of the 2000 season, he had 11 receptions for 147 yards and a touchdown in a loss to the New England Patriots. In the 2000 season, he had 93 receptions for 1,203 receiving yards and nine receiving touchdowns. He was named to the Pro Bowl and as a First Team All-Pro for the 2000 season. In the 2001 season, he had 73 receptions for 917 receiving yards and six receiving touchdowns while earning his third career First Team All-Pro honor and Pro Bowl nomination. On November 4, against the San Diego Chargers, he threw his first professional pass, which went for 40 yards.

During the 2002 offseason, Gonzalez briefly resumed his basketball career, playing for the Miami Heat in the NBA Summer League. He appeared in two games, with his best outing being an 11 rebound performance in a 72–71 win against the Indiana Pacers. Despite never considering bringing Gonzalez to training camp due to his ongoing football career, then coach Pat Riley later stated that "If he ever would have pursued it, I think he would have been a 10-year pro".

In week 4 of the 2002 season, Gonzalez had seven receptions for 140 yards and a career-high three touchdowns in a win over the Miami Dolphins. In the 2002 season, he had 63 receptions for 773 receiving yards and seven receiving touchdowns to go along with yet another Pro Bowl nod. From 2003 to 2006, Gonzalez was the most productive tight end in the NFL. In the 2003 season, he had 71 receptions for 916 receiving yards and ten receiving touchdowns. For the fourth time in his career, he was named as a First Team All-Pro. He was named to his fifth consecutive Pro Bowl for the 2003 season. His best season statistically came in 2004, when he caught an NFL-record (for a tight end) 102 passes for 1,258 yards and seven touchdowns. In week 17, he had a career-high 14 receptions for 144 yards against the San Diego Chargers. He earned a spot in the Pro Bowl for his historic season. Gonzalez's single-season record of 102 receptions by a tight end stood for 8 years, until it was broken by Jason Witten during the 2012 season. In the 2005 season, he had 78 receptions for 905 receiving yards and two receiving touchdowns in another Pro Bowl season.

Starting late in 2006, Gonzalez began to close in on numerous team and league receiving records. He finished with 73 receptions for 900 receiving yards and five receiving touchdowns and earned his eighth consecutive Pro Bowl nomination. In 2006, Gonzalez broke wide receiver Otis Taylor's Chiefs team receiving yards and touchdowns mark, and also passed running back Priest Holmes for the team yards from scrimmage record.

In 2007, Gonzalez continued his productivity in spite of the generally poor play of the Chiefs' offense. Though the Chiefs finished at or near the bottom in most major offensive categories, Gonzalez led the Chiefs and all NFL tight ends in receptions (99) and receiving yards (1,172) while being named to his ninth straight Pro Bowl.

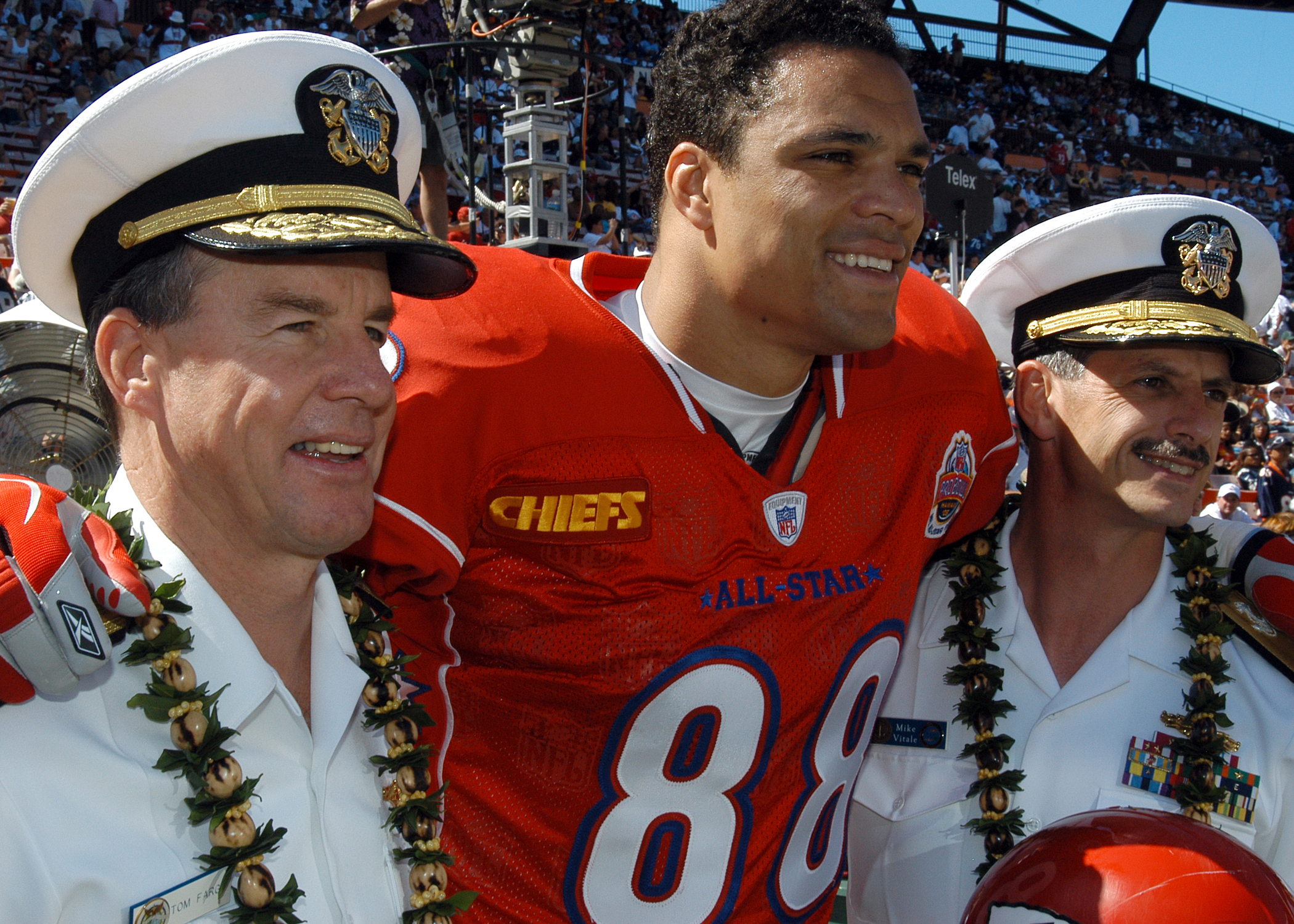
Gonzalez at Pro Bowl 2005

On October 14, 2007, Gonzalez broke the career touchdown reception record for tight ends previously held by Shannon Sharpe, as well as passing Ozzie Newsome for second in career receiving yards for a tight end. On December 23, 2007, Gonzalez recorded his third season with 1,000 receiving yards, tying him with Kellen Winslow, Todd Christensen, and Shannon Sharpe for most ever by a tight end, and on December 30, 2007, Gonzalez passed Shannon Sharpe for most receptions all time by a tight end.

In week 4 of the 2008 season, Gonzalez became NFL all-time leader in receiving yards for a tight end with 10,064, surpassing Shannon Sharpe. He recorded 96 receptions for 1,058 yards and was also elected to his tenth career Pro Bowl. For the fifth time in his career, he earned First Team All-Pro honors. Running up to the NFL trade deadline, the Packers and the Eagles were in last minute talks with the Chiefs to trade a third-round draft pick for him. But Chiefs' GM Carl Peterson said he wanted a second-round draft pick instead and the deal fell through.

During the 2009 offseason, Gonzalez again approached Chiefs management about a possible trade. Unlike the previous Chiefs management, new Chiefs' GM Scott Pioli told Gonzalez he would see what he could do.

=== Atlanta Falcons ===
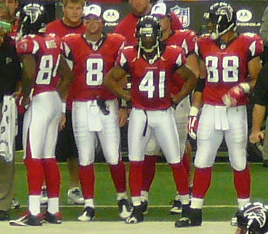
Tony Gonzalez (right) with Chris Redman, Roddy White and Antoine Harris

Gonzalez was traded to the Atlanta Falcons in exchange for a second round pick in the 2010 NFL draft on April 23, 2009. In his first regular season game with Atlanta against the Miami Dolphins, Gonzalez caught a touchdown pass from Matt Ryan and became the 21st player, and the first tight end, in NFL history with 11,000 receiving yards. He finished the game leading the Falcons in receiving with five receptions for 73 yards and one touchdown, his 20-yard touchdown reception marking only the third time he scored in the opening game of the season. Although Gonzalez recorded 83 receptions for 867 yards and 6 touchdowns, his total statistics went down from the previous years in Kansas City, and Gonzalez was not invited to the Pro Bowl for the first time in 10 years. He was named to the Pro Football Hall of Fame All-Decade Team for the years 2000–2009.

In the 2010 regular season opener against the Pittsburgh Steelers, Gonzalez made his 1,000th career reception, making him the seventh player in NFL history to do so and the first tight end. Gonzalez had his best performance as a Falcon two weeks later against the defending Super Bowl champions New Orleans Saints, as caught eight catches for 110 yards and a touchdown to help lead Atlanta to an overtime victory. His play in 2010, helped him return to the Pro Bowl that year. The Falcons also finished 13–3 that season to earn the first-seed in the playoffs. In Gonzalez's first playoff game in five years, the Falcons were defeated by the eventual Super Bowl champions Green Bay Packers.

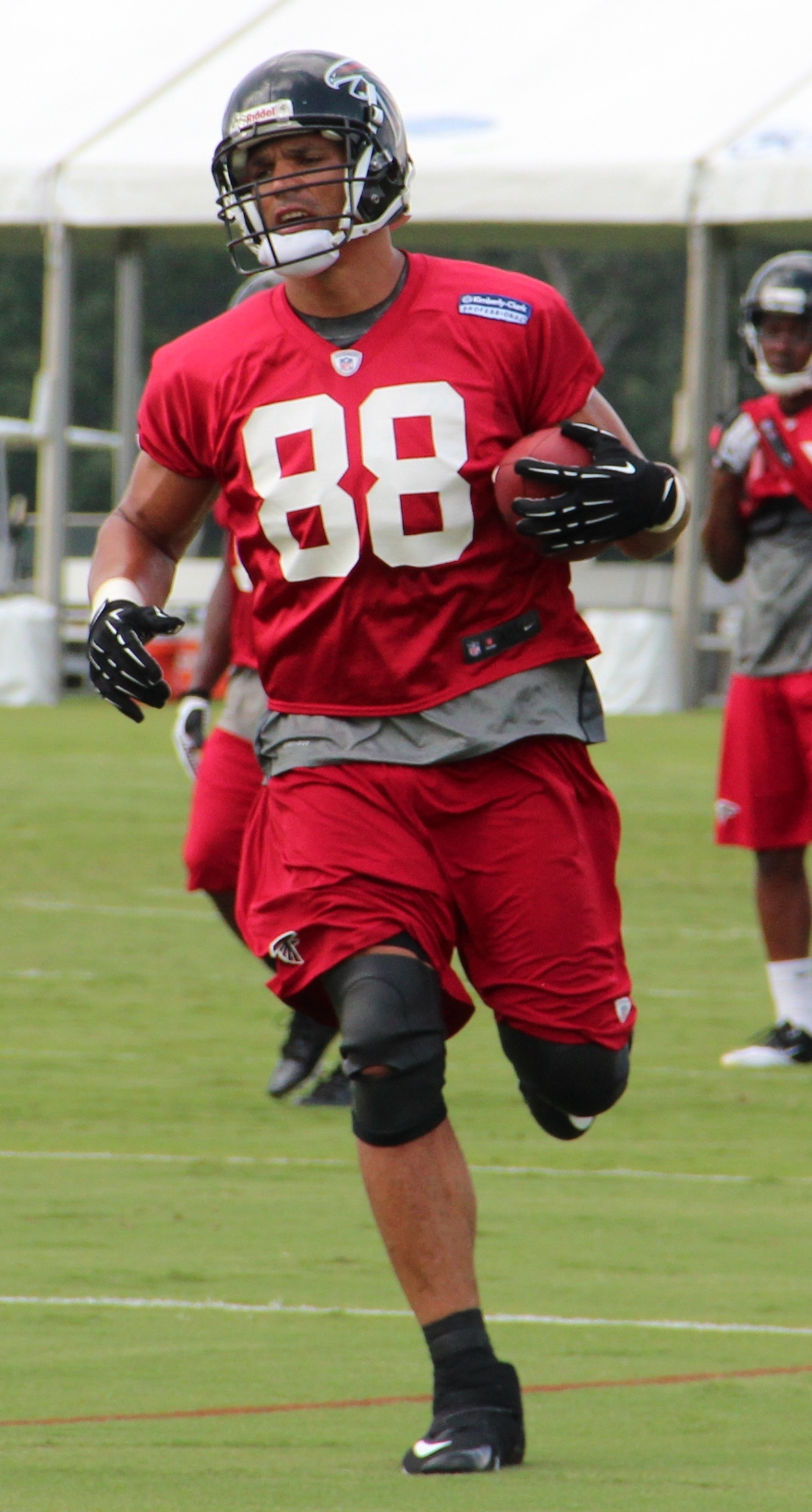
Tony Gonzalez at Falcons training camp, 2013

During the NFL lockout in 2011, Gonzalez contemplated retiring rather than sitting out an entire season and waiting to play in 2012. After the lockout was eventually lifted by the league, Gonzalez was adamant he had at least three seasons left in him and was excited at the prospects of returning to the Falcons who were widely considered to be Super Bowl contenders. On the NFL Top 100 Players of 2011, he was ranked 46th by his fellow players.

In the 2011 season, Gonzalez finished with 80 receptions for 875 receiving yards and seven receiving touchdowns. He was named to the Pro Bowl and was ranked 53rd among his peers on the NFL Top 100 Players of 2012.

With Gonzalez's contract set to expire following the conclusion of the 2011 season, he signed a 1-year $7 million contract extension with the Falcons on January 1, 2012, indicating his intent to return for at least one season. In the 2012 season opener, Gonzalez played in Arrowhead Stadium against the Chiefs for the first time in his career, which ended with a Falcons' victory. Gonzalez caught his 100th career touchdown on November 11, 2012, in a week 10 game against the New Orleans Saints, becoming the only tight end in NFL history to catch 100 touchdown passes. Overall, he finished the 2012 season with 93 receptions for 930 receiving yards and eight receiving touchdowns to earn another First Team All-Pro honor and Pro Bowl nomination. On January 13, 2013, Gonzalez won the only playoff game of his career when the Falcons defeated the Seattle Seahawks 30–28. His fellow players ranked him 47th on the NFL Top 100 Players of 2013.

Throughout the 2012 season, he insisted on retiring. However, on March 12, 2013, on his Twitter page, he said, "I'm happy to say that after speaking with my family, I'm coming back." Then, later that day, he posted,"The lure of being on such a great team and organization, along with unbelievable fan support was too good to pass up."

On March 15, 2013, Gonzalez agreed to re-sign with the Falcons to a two-year, $14 million contract, despite his claim that he would be retiring after the 2013 season. With the retirement of Randy Moss, 37-year-old Gonzalez spent his last season as the NFL's active leader in receiving yards. On September 29, against the New England Patriots, he had 12 receptions for a career-high 149 receiving yards and two touchdowns. Gonzalez played his final NFL game against the Carolina Panthers on December 29. He finished his final season with 83 receptions for 859 receiving yards and eight receiving touchdowns. He would later be named a second alternate for the Pro Bowl that season, and was added to the roster when San Francisco 49ers tight end Vernon Davis declined the invitation. It was his 14th and final Pro Bowl appearance, which at the time tied him with Bruce Matthews and Merlin Olsen for the most selections for the game.

=== Legacy ===
Gonzalez is frequently considered the greatest tight end of all time. During his career, he broke numerous NFL records for tight ends. Only two of his major records have been broken, most career touchdowns and most 1,000 yard seasons by a tight end. Additionally, he also owns several Chiefs team records and at the time of his retirement, he finished in the top 10 in many receiving categories for any position. He finished 5th in yards, 2nd in receptions, and 6th in touchdowns. He ended his career with an active consecutive games with a reception streak of 265 which ran from a game played on November 26, 2000, to his final game on December 29, 2013. He only failed to record a reception in 5 of his 270 games he played, the majority of which occurred his rookie season. In addition to consistently recording catches, Gonzalez also was extremely durable during his career playing 270 of a possible 272 games in his career. On January 26, 2018, the Chiefs announced they would induct Gonzalez into the Chiefs Hall of Fame. He was inducted during halftime of a game during the 2018 season. In his first year of eligibility in 2019, Gonzalez was inducted into the Pro Football Hall of Fame. He was named to the NFL 2000s All-Decade team as well as the NFL 100th Anniversary All-Time Team.

== Career statistics ==
Legend
	Led the league
**Bold**	Career high

=== NFL ===
==== Regular season ====
Year	Team	Games		Receiving					Fumbles	
Year	Team	GP	GS	Rec	Yds	Avg	Lng	TD	Fum	Lost
1997	KC	16	0	33	368	11.2	30	2	0	0
1998	KC	16	16	59	621	10.5	32	2	**3**	**1**
1999	KC	15	15	76	849	11.2	**73**	**11**	2	**1**
2000	KC	16	16	93	1,203	**12.9**	39	9	0	0
2001	KC	16	16	73	917	12.6	36	6	0	0
2002	KC	16	16	63	773	12.3	42	7	0	0
2003	KC	16	16	71	916	**12.9**	67	10	0	0
2004	KC	16	16	**102**	**1,258**	12.3	32	7	0	0
2005	KC	16	16	78	905	11.6	39	2	0	0
2006	KC	15	15	73	900	12.3	57	5	1	0
2007	KC	16	16	99	1,172	11.8	31	5	0	0
2008	KC	16	16	96	1,058	11.0	35	10	0	0
2009	ATL	16	16	83	867	10.4	27	6	0	0
2010	ATL	16	16	70	656	9.4	34	6	0	0
2011	ATL	16	16	80	875	10.9	30	7	0	0
2012	ATL	16	16	93	930	10.0	25	8	0	0
2013	ATL	16	16	83	859	10.3	25	8	0	0
Career		270	254	1,325	15,127	11.4	73	111	6	2

==== Postseason ====
Year	Team	Games		Receiving					Fumbles	
Year	Team	GP	GS	Rec	Yds	Avg	Lng	TD	Fum	Lost
1997	KC	1	0	3	26	8.7	12	1	0	0
2003	KC	1	1	4	55	**13.8**	**22**	0	0	0
2006	KC	1	1	4	25	6.3	9	1	0	0
2010	ATL	1	1	1	7	7.0	7	0	0	0
2011	ATL	1	1	4	44	11.0	16	0	0	0
2012	ATL	2	2	**14**	**129**	9.2	19	**2**	0	0
Career		7	6	30	286	9.5	22	4	0	0

=== College football ===
Season	Team	Rec	Yds	Avg	TD
1994	California	8	62	7.8	1
1995	California	37	541	14.6	2
1996	California	**44**	**699**	**15.9**	**5**
Career		89	1,302	14.6	8

=== College basketball ===
Season	FGM	FGA	FG%	FTM	FTA	FT%	PPG	RPG
1994–95	**71**	111	**.640**	42	68	.618	**7.1**	3.88
1995–96	48	103	.466	**51**	75	**.680**	5.3	**4.64**
1996–97	70	**156**	.449	**51**	**87**	.586	6.8	4.46
Career	189	370	.510	144	230	.626	6.4	4.34

== Career highlights ==
=== Awards and honors ===
NFL

- 6× First-team All-Pro (1999–2001, 2003, 2008, 2012)
- 4× Second-team All-Pro (2002, 2004, 2006, 2007)
- 14× Pro Bowl (1999–2008, 2010–2013)
- NFL receptions leader (2004)
- 3× NFL Top 100 — 46th (2011), 53rd (2012), 47th (2013)
- NFL 2000s All-Decade Team
- NFL 100th Anniversary All-Time Team
- No. 45 on The Top 100: NFL's Greatest Players
- PFWA All-Rookie Team (1997)
- Kansas City Chiefs Hall of Fame
- PFWA Good Guy Award (2013)

College

- Consensus All-American (1996)
- First-team All-Pac-10 (1996)

=== NFL records ===
- Career receiving yards for a tight end (15,127)
- Career receptions for a tight end (1,325)
- Pro Bowl All-Time leader in Receptions (49)

== Post-NFL career ==
Following his retirement, Gonzalez became an analyst on CBS's NFL pregame show NFL Today. He worked for CBS until the end of the 2016 season.

On May 10, 2017, Gonzalez was added to Fox's pregame show. Gonzalez left Fox on July 16, 2021, to focus on more TV and film projects.

On April 28, 2022, it was announced during the 2022 NFL draft that Gonzalez will return to broadcasting after a one-year hiatus, and join Amazon as a studio analyst for Thursday Night Football for the 2022 season.

== Film and television ==
Gonzalez has done some acting, primarily cameo roles as himself. In 2006, he had a minor role in the TV film A.I. Assault, his first non-cameo acting job. He has also appeared in three episodes of NCIS as Special Agent Tony Francis. In the 2017 film XXX: Return of Xander Cage, he played Paul Donovan, his first feature film role as an actor.

In March 2015, Gonzalez hosted You Can't Lick Your Elbow on the National Geographic Channel, which ran for six episodes.

In 2015, Gonzalez and his older brother Chris, were profiled in the documentary, Play It Forward. The film premiered at the Opening Gala during the Tribeca Film Festival.

Gonzalez competed against linebacker Ray Lewis in an episode of Spike's Lip Sync Battle, which aired on February 2, 2017. He performed Digital Underground's "The Humpty Dance" and Devo's "Whip It", but did not win.

=== Filmography ===
Documentaries/game shows

Year	Title
2005	MTV Cribs
2006	Celebrity Cooking Showdown
2007	Hard Knocks: Training Camp with the Kansas City Chiefs
2008	Oprah Winfrey's The Big Give
2015	You Can't Lick Your Elbow
2017	Beat Shazam
2017	Lip Sync Battle

Acting

Year	Title	Role
2002	Arliss	Himself
2004	Married to the Kellys	Himself
2006	A.I. Assault	Derek Williams
2010	One Tree Hill	Himself
2013	NFL Rush Zone	Himself
2014, 2016	NCIS	Special Agent Tony Francis
2017	XXX: Return of Xander Cage	Paul Donovan
2022	MVP	Tony
2022	Fantasy Football	Coach Lance Evans
2022	Long Slow Exhale	Desmond
2025	Elsbeth	Guy Masters

== Personal life ==
In early 2007, Gonzalez suffered a bout of facial paralysis known as Bell's palsy. He subsequently experimented with a vegan diet after reading The China Study, but he and his nutritionist, Mitzi Dulan, ultimately decided that eating meat occasionally would be best for his performance. Gonzalez only eats organic fruits and vegetables, free-range chicken, grass-fed beef (no more than 18 ounces a month), and fish.

Gonzalez had a commitment ceremony in July 2007 with his girlfriend, October, though the couple considers themselves married despite not being legally married. They have three children together, two daughters and a son. He has another son who was born in 2001 from a relationship with entertainment reporter Lauren Sánchez. He lives in Huntington Beach, California.

On July 3, 2008, while dining with his family at a restaurant in Huntington Beach, California, Gonzalez noticed a fellow diner choking on a piece of meat at a nearby table, unable to breathe. Gonzalez successfully administered the Heimlich maneuver, saving the diner's life.

Gonzalez campaigned for then-Senator Barack Obama in the 2008 presidential election, saying "this is the first time in my life that I've ever been political about anything."

He was the grand marshal of the 2014 Huntington Beach Fourth of July Parade.

On a season 9 episode of PBS's Finding Your Roots, Gonzalez learned that his great-great-great-grandfather, George, was sold away from his wife Polly and children to a nearby slave owner. In 1866, a year after the end of the Civil War, George and Polly were found listed on a cohabitation record, meaning they had gotten married, as soon as it became legal for them to do so. Gonzalez also learned he is a very distant relative of William Shakespeare and comedian Whoopi Goldberg.

=== Other endeavors ===
Along with playing in the NFL, Gonzalez has been involved in a number of business ventures. While playing for the Chiefs, he co-founded Extreme Clean 88, a commercial cleaning service in Kansas City. While in Kansas City, Gonzalez also contributed to Shadow Buddies, a charity that works with hospitalized children. Gonzalez, is also an Ambassador for the non-profit, Scholars' Hope Foundation in Huntington Beach. It is an after-school academic enrichment program that helps students be the best version of themselves and to encourage them into higher education.

In 2009, Gonzalez co-authored the book The All-Pro Diet. The book, co-written with Mitzi Dulan, the former nutritionist for the Chiefs, details his diet and workout routine and provides practical suggestions for others to follow the same path.

Later in 2009, Gonzalez co-founded All-Pro Science, a sports nutrition company that manufactured a complete line of protein shakes, vitamins and other supplements. The products in the APS line follow a similar philosophy to the one set forth in Gonzalez's book, focusing on a balance of foods from all-natural sources. However, the company's website is inactive and its products are unavailable.

From 2013 to 2017, Gonzalez worked with FitStar, a company that makes mobile fitness apps, helping people get in shape with customized workouts delivered via the iPhone, iPad and iPod touch. He appears in the FitStar Personal Trainer, leading users through personalized Sessions.

In December 2022, Gonzalez joined the Advisory Council of GoodLeap, a sustainable home improvement fintech company, to support its mission of financing renewable energy solutions and promoting environmental sustainability.
