= Stephen Nicholas =

American football player and coach (born 1983)

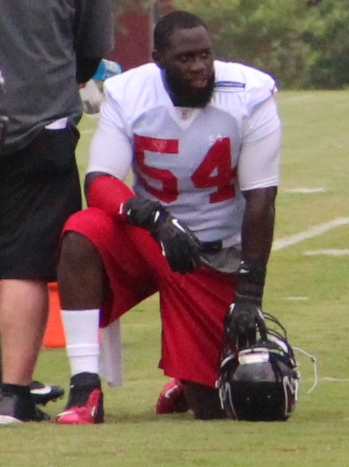
- Nicholas with the Atlanta Falcons in 2013

Tampa Bay Buccaneers
- Title: Defensive quality control coach

Personal information
- Born: May 1, 1983 (age 43); Jacksonville, Florida, U.S.
- Listed height: 6 ft 3 in (1.91 m)
- Listed weight: 236 lb (107 kg)

Career information
- High school: Lee (Jacksonville)
- College: South Florida
- NFL draft: 2007: 4th round, 109th overall pick

Career history

Playing
- Atlanta Falcons (2007–2013)

Coaching
- Tampa Bay Buccaneers (2018–present) Defensive quality control

Career NFL statistics
- Total tackles: 378
- Sacks: 8.0
- Forced fumbles: 5
- Fumble recoveries: 4
- Interceptions: 2
- Stats at Pro Football Reference

Stephen Leron Nicholas (born May 1, 1983) is an American professional football coach and former player who is the defensive quality control coach for the Tampa Bay Buccaneers of the National Football League (NFL). He played seven seasons in the NFL as a linebacker for the Atlanta Falcons.

Nicholas played college football for the South Florida Bulls. He was selected by the Falcons in the fourth round of the 2007 NFL draft.

== Early life ==
Nicholas played high school football at Robert E. Lee High School in Jacksonville, Florida. As a senior, he was a class 3A all-state linebacker and was invited to play in the Shrine Bowl.

== College career ==
Nicholas played college football at the University of South Florida. During his senior year, he was a Big East first-team selection. He finished his college career with 326 tackles, 20 sacks, and a school record 53.5 tackles for loss.

== Professional career ==
Nicholas was selected by the Atlanta Falcons in the fourth round of the 2007 NFL draft with the 109th overall pick. He finished his rookie year with 37 tackles and one sack. In 2008, he saw action in all 16 games during the season. In 2009, he started 14 games, totaling 82 tackles, 3 sacks. He started his first career game against Miami on September 13. Nicholas was released by the Falcons after seven seasons on February 5, 2014.

== NFL career statistics ==
Legend
**Bold**	Career high

=== Regular season ===
Year	Team	Games		Tackles					Interceptions					Fumbles			
Year	Team	GP	GS	Cmb	Solo	Ast	Sck	TFL	Int	Yds	TD	Lng	PD	FF	FR	Yds	TD
2007	ATL	13	0	33	29	4	1.0	0	0	0	0	0	0	0	**1**	0	0
2008	ATL	**16**	0	20	16	4	1.0	1	0	0	0	0	1	0	0	0	0
2009	ATL	**16**	13	80	65	15	**3.0**	4	0	0	0	0	3	1	**1**	0	0
2010	ATL	**16**	11	78	64	14	0.0	2	**1**	0	0	0	2	0	0	0	0
2011	ATL	10	8	35	17	18	0.0	4	0	0	0	0	1	**2**	**1**	**2**	0
2012	ATL	**16**	**15**	**97**	**72**	**25**	2.0	**5**	**1**	**3**	0	**3**	**4**	1	**1**	0	0
2013	ATL	14	3	35	21	14	1.0	2	0	0	0	0	1	1	0	0	0
		101	50	378	284	94	8.0	18	2	3	0	3	12	5	4	2	0

=== Playoffs ===
Year	Team	Games		Tackles					Interceptions					Fumbles			
Year	Team	GP	GS	Cmb	Solo	Ast	Sck	TFL	Int	Yds	TD	Lng	PD	FF	FR	Yds	TD
2008	ATL	1	0	2	1	1	0.0	0	0	0	0	0	0	0	0	0	0
2010	ATL	1	1	5	4	1	0.0	0	0	0	0	0	0	**1**	0	0	0
2012	ATL	**2**	**2**	**8**	**5**	**3**	0.0	0	0	0	0	0	0	0	**1**	0	0
		4	3	15	10	5	0.0	0	0	0	0	0	0	1	1	0	0

== Coaching career ==
In 2018, Nicholas was hired by the Tampa Bay Buccaneers to be their defensive quality control coach.

== Personal life ==
Stephen Nicholas married then Irene Ledbetter (2007) and have 4 children. Nicholas is also a member of Omega Psi Phi fraternity.
