= Peria Jerry =

American football player (born 1984)

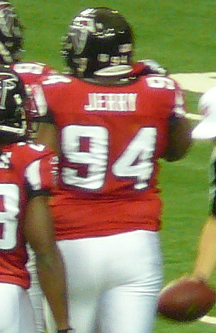
- Jerry with the Atlanta Falcons in 2009

No. 94
- Position: Defensive tackle

Personal information
- Born: August 23, 1984 (age 42); Memphis, Tennessee, U.S.
- Listed height: 6 ft 2 in (1.88 m)
- Listed weight: 295 lb (134 kg)

Career information
- High school: South Panola (Batesville, Mississippi)
- College: Mississippi (2005–2008)
- NFL draft: 2009: 1st round, 24th overall pick

Career history
- Atlanta Falcons (2009–2013)

Awards and highlights
- First-team All-American (2008); First-team All-SEC (2008); Second-team All-SEC (2007)

Career NFL statistics
- Total tackles: 67
- Sacks: 5.5
- Forced fumbles: 1
- Fumble recoveries: 2
- Stats at Pro Football Reference

Peria Edward Jerry (/pəˈreɪ/; born August 23, 1984) is an American former professional football player who was a defensive tackle in the National Football League (NFL). He was selected by the Atlanta Falcons in the first round of the 2009 NFL draft. He played college football for the University of Mississippi. Jerry retired from football in 2014 after five seasons with the Falcons. He is the older brother of former offensive guard John Jerry.

== Early life ==
While playing for South Panola High School in Batesville, Mississippi, Jerry was selected first team All-State and Class 5A Defensive Player of the Year by the Mississippi Association of Coaches. He was also named first team All-State by The Clarion-Ledger.

Jerry signed with Ole Miss in the 2004 recruiting class, but decided to attend Hargrave Military Academy. There, he was rated as the No. 15 prep school player in the country by Rivals.com. He played in eight games at Hargrave during the 2004 season and was credited with 30 tackles, including five quarterback sacks.

== College career ==
The 2005 season was Jerry's true freshman season at Ole Miss. After missing the first four games due to injury, he played in six of the final seven games. He finished the season with three total tackles.

In 2006, Jerry battled through injuries to play in eight games, making six starts along the defensive line. He made starts at end, tackle and nose tackle. He totaled 22 tackles on the season with 1 tackle for a loss and 1 QB sack. In the Spring, he received the Jeff Hamm Memorial Award for the most improved defensive player of spring drills. He moved from tackle to end and promptly emerged as the starter. Jerry was rated an "Emerging Star" at Ole Miss by Lindy's magazine.

In 2007, Jerry was named to the Second Team All-SEC by the Associated Press and Rivals.com. He started all 12 games at defensive tackle and was ranked sixth in the SEC in tackles for losses (TFLs) with 14. He finished second on the team in TFLs, 3 and a half QB sacks, 4 QB hurries and 58 total tackles.

In 2008, Jerry was named to the All-SEC First Team by the leagues coaches and to the All-SEC First Team by the nation's news media. Additionally, he was named to the Associated Press All-America First Team.

== Professional career ==
Drawing comparisons to Vonnie Holliday and Cory Redding, Jerry was commonly ranked as the second-best defensive tackle available in the 2009 NFL draft, behind only Boston College's B. J. Raji. He was selected in the first round with the 24th overall pick by the Atlanta Falcons.

Pre-draft measurables
Height	Weight	Arm length	Hand span	40-yard dash	10-yard split	20-yard split	20-yard shuttle	Three-cone drill	Vertical jump	Broad jump	Bench press
6 ft 1 3/4 in (1.87 m)	299 lb (136 kg)	32 1/2 in (0.83 m)	9 1/2 in (0.24 m)	4.98 s	1.68 s	2.86 s	4.64 s	7.30 s	31.0 in (0.79 m)	9 ft 6 in (2.90 m)	28 reps
All values from NFL Combine/Pro Day

Jerry was signed to a five-year contract by the Falcons on July 30, 2009. He competed with Trey Lewis to replace Grady Jackson, who was not re-signed by the Falcons, at defensive tackle.

Peria Jerry suffered a major knee injury on September 20, 2009, which caused him to miss the remainder of the 2009 season.

In 2010, he came back from injury, and played in all 16 games. However, he lost his starting job to rookie DT Corey Peters.

On July 31, 2014, Jerry announced his retirement from the NFL.

=== NFL statistics ===
Year	Team	GP	COMB	TOTAL	AST	SACK	FF	FR	FR YDS	INT	IR YDS	AVG IR	LNG	TD	PD
2009	ATL	2	1	0	1	0.0	0	0	0	0	0	0	0	0	0
2010	ATL	16	9	8	1	2.0	0	0	0	0	0	0	0	0	1
2011	ATL	16	10	7	3	0.0	1	0	0	0	0	0	0	0	1
2012	ATL	14	14	11	3	0.0	0	1	0	0	0	0	0	0	0
2013	ATL	16	33	25	8	3.5	0	1	0	0	0	0	0	0	1
Career		64	67	51	16	5.5	1	2	0	0	0	0	0	0	3

== Personal ==
Peria Jerry is the older brother of former NFL player John Jerry.
