= Chris Owens (American football) =

American football player (born 1986)

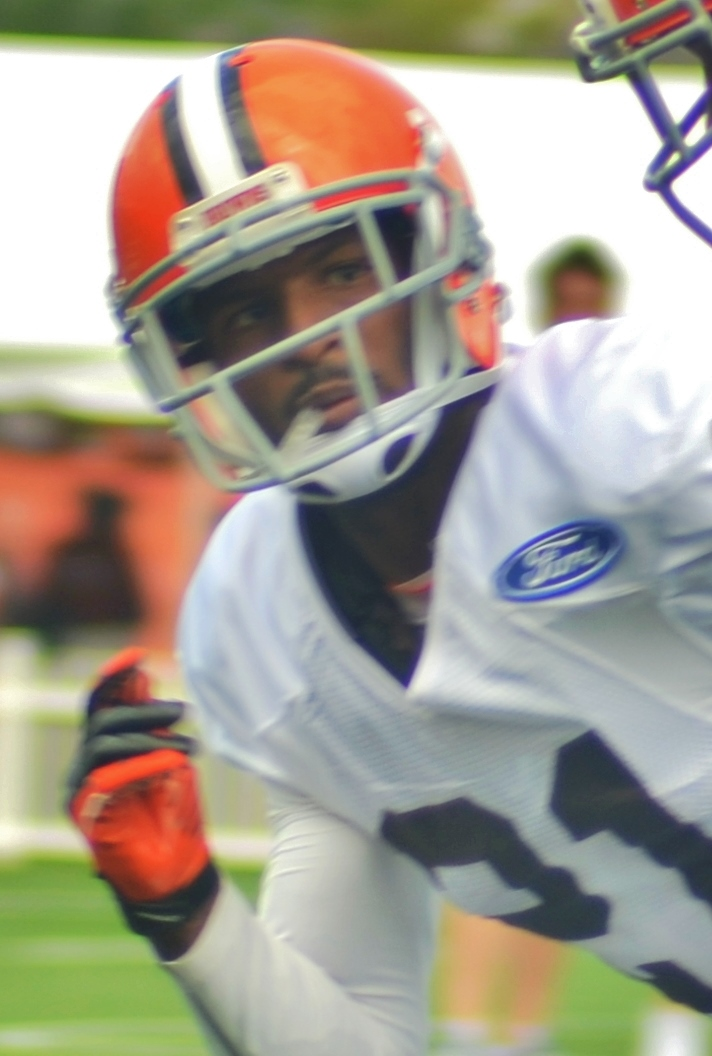
- Owens with the Cleveland Browns in 2013

No. 21, 41, 20, 30
- Position: Cornerback

Personal information
- Born: December 1, 1986 (age 39); Los Angeles, California, U.S.
- Listed height: 5 ft 9 in (1.75 m)
- Listed weight: 180 lb (82 kg)

Career information
- High school: Susan Miller Dorsey (Los Angeles)
- College: San Jose State
- NFL draft: 2009: 3rd round, 90th overall pick

Career history
- Atlanta Falcons (2009–2012); Cleveland Browns (2013); Miami Dolphins (2013); Kansas City Chiefs (2014); Detroit Lions (2015); New Orleans Saints (2015)

Career NFL statistics
- Total tackles: 217
- Sacks: 4
- Forced fumbles: 2
- Fumble recoveries: 3
- Interceptions: 3
- Stats at Pro Football Reference

Christopher Todd Dillard Owens (born December 1, 1986) is an American former professional football player who was a cornerback in the National Football League (NFL). He was selected by the Atlanta Falcons in the third round of the 2009 NFL draft. He played college football for the San Jose State Spartans.

== Early life ==
Born in Los Angeles, California, Owens attended Susan Miller Dorsey High School in Los Angeles. Owens, in his senior season, had five interceptions and was named first-team all-league. Owens graduated from Dorsey High in 2004.

College recruiting
Name	Hometown	School	Height	Weight	40^{‡}	Commit date
Chris Owens; CB	Los Angeles, CA	Dorsey HS	5 ft 11 in (1.80 m)	175 lb (79 kg)	4.5	Feb 4, 2004
Chris Owens; CB	Recruit ratings: Rivals:					
Overall recruit ranking: Scout: 111 (school) Rivals: 111 (school)
‡ Refers to 40-yard dash; Note: In many cases, Scout, Rivals, 247Sports, On3, and ESPN may conflict in their listings of height, weight and 40 time.; In these cases, the average was taken. ESPN grades are on a 100-point scale.; Sources: "2004 San Jose St. Football Commitment List". Rivals.; "2004 San Jose State College Football Recruiting Commits". Scout.; "Scout.com Team Recruiting Rankings". Scout.; "2004 Team Ranking". Rivals.com.

== College career ==
Part of Fitz Hill's final recruiting class, Owens attended San Jose State University, the only school that offered him an athletic scholarship. Owens redshirted his freshman year and first played in 2005, under new head coach Dick Tomey. In 11 games played as a freshman, Owens had 35 tackles, 2 interceptions, 6 passes defended, and a forced fumble. As a sophomore in 2006, Owens led San Jose State to the 2006 New Mexico Bowl title and played 13 games (starting all 13) with 50 tackles, 4 interceptions, and 9 passes defended.

As a junior in 2007, Owens was selected All-WAC second-team and led the conference with six interceptions; he also had 75 tackles and 9 passes defended. In his senior season of 2008, Owens had 68 tackles, one interception, 9 passes defended, and 2 forced fumbles.

== Professional career ==
Pre-draft measurables
Height	Weight	40-yard dash	10-yard split	20-yard split	20-yard shuttle	Three-cone drill	Vertical jump	Broad jump	Bench press
5 ft 10 in (1.78 m)	181 lb (82 kg)	4.51 s	1.53 s	2.59 s	4.17 s	6.93 s	34.5 in (0.88 m)	9 ft 2 in (2.79 m)	14 reps
Measurements were taken at the NFL Scouting Combine.

=== Atlanta Falcons ===
In the 2009 NFL draft, the Atlanta Falcons selected Owens in the third round, 90th overall. As a rookie, Owens played 16 games with 6 starts. He had 29 tackles, 2 passes defended, and 2 interceptions.

In 2010, Owens again played in 16 games and had 3 starts. He had 40 tackles, 1 pass defended, and 3 interceptions. In the Falcons' Divisional Round loss to eventual Super Bowl XLV champions Green Bay Packers, Owens had 7 tackles, a pass defended, and a quarterback hit.

In 2011, Owens played 14 games with 2 starts. He had 27 tackles, a sack, 3 passes defended, a quarterback hit, 2 tackles for loss, and 8 special teams tackles.

In 2012, Owens played in 13 games with one start. In the regular season, Owens had 17 tackles, 4 passes defended, one tackle for loss, one forced fumble, and 5 special teams tackles. In the postseason, Owens played in the NFC Championship Game, a 28-24 loss to the San Francisco 49ers. Owens had one tackle, on special teams.

=== Cleveland Browns ===
Owens signed with the Cleveland Browns in 2013. He played 12 games with 2 starts and had 51 tackles, 2.5 sacks (for a total loss of 13.5 yards), 3 passes defended, 2 quarterback hits, a tackle for loss, a fumble recovery, a forced fumble, and six special teams tackles. On December 17, the Browns waived Owens.

=== Miami Dolphins ===
The following day, Owens signed with the Miami Dolphins. Owens played in the Dolphins' season finale, a 20-7 loss to the New York Jets, and had a tackle on special teams.

=== Kansas City Chiefs ===
On March 21, 2014, Owens signed with the Kansas City Chiefs. In the 2014 season, Owens played 11 games with 3 starts for the Chiefs and had 33 tackles with 4 passes defended.

=== Detroit Lions ===
On May 13, 2015, the Detroit Lions signed Owens to a one-year contract. On August 31, 2015, the Lions placed Owens on IR.

=== New Orleans Saints ===
On November 25, 2015 Owens signed with the New Orleans Saints.

== NFL career statistics ==
Legend
**Bold**	Career high

=== Regular season ===
Year	Team	Games		Tackles					Interceptions					Fumbles			
Year	Team	GP	GS	Cmb	Solo	Ast	Sck	TFL	Int	Yds	TD	Lng	PD	FF	FR	Yds	TD
2009	ATL	**16**	**6**	29	24	5	0.0	0	**2**	**13**	0	**13**	2	0	**1**	0	0
2010	ATL	**16**	3	40	29	11	0.0	0	1	**13**	0	**13**	3	0	0	0	0
2011	ATL	14	2	35	28	7	1.0	**2**	0	0	0	0	3	0	0	0	0
2012	ATL	13	1	22	19	3	0.0	1	0	0	0	0	**4**	**1**	0	0	0
2013	CLE	12	2	**57**	**45**	**12**	**2.5**	1	0	0	0	0	3	**1**	**1**	0	0
2013	MIA	1	0	1	1	0	0.0	0	0	0	0	0	0	0	0	0	0
2014	KAN	11	3	33	27	6	0.5	1	0	0	0	0	**4**	0	**1**	0	0
2015	NOR	4	0	0	0	0	0.0	0	0	0	0	0	0	0	0	0	0
		87	17	217	173	44	4.0	5	3	26	0	13	19	2	3	0	0

=== Playoffs ===
Year	Team	Games		Tackles					Interceptions					Fumbles			
Year	Team	GP	GS	Cmb	Solo	Ast	Sck	TFL	Int	Yds	TD	Lng	PD	FF	FR	Yds	TD
2010	ATL	**1**	0	**7**	**5**	**2**	0.0	0	0	0	0	0	1	0	0	0	0
2011	ATL	**1**	**1**	6	**5**	1	0.0	0	0	0	0	0	**2**	0	0	0	0
2012	ATL	**1**	0	1	1	0	0.0	0	0	0	0	0	0	0	0	0	0
		3	1	14	11	3	0.0	0	0	0	0	0	3	0	0	0	0

== Personal life ==
Owens is a member of Phi Beta Sigma fraternity, joining the Mu Lambda chapter at San Jose State in 2006. Owens's brother Alvin played for the San Diego Riptide of the af2, and Owens's cousin Bené Benwikere also played cornerback at San Jose State and was selected in 2014 by the Carolina Panthers.
