= Antoine Harris =

American football player (born 1982)

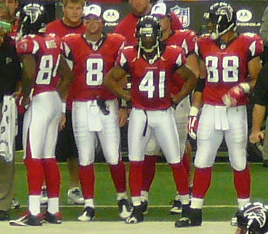
- Harris (41) with Roddy White, Chris Redman and Tony Gonzalez in 2009

No. 41
- Position: Safety

Personal information
- Born: April 8, 1982 (age 44); Columbus, Ohio, U.S.
- Listed height: 5 ft 10 in (1.78 m)
- Listed weight: 205 lb (93 kg)

Career information
- College: Louisville
- NFL draft: 2005: undrafted

Career history
- Tennessee Titans (2005–2006)*; Atlanta Falcons (2007–2009); Philadelphia Eagles (2010)
- * Offseason or practice squad member only

Career NFL statistics
- Total tackles: 21
- Forced fumbles: 1
- Pass deflections: 1
- Stats at Pro Football Reference

Antoine Glenn Harris (born April 8, 1982) is an American former professional football player who was a safety in the National Football League (NFL). He played college football for the Louisville Cardinals and was signed by the Tennessee Titans as an undrafted free agent in 2005.

Harris was also a member of the Atlanta Falcons and Philadelphia Eagles.

== Professional career ==
Pre-draft measurables
Height	Weight	40-yard dash	20-yard shuttle	Three-cone drill	Vertical jump	Broad jump
5 ft 10 in (1.78 m)	194 lb (88 kg)	4.48 s	4.01 s	6.90 s	36.0 in (0.91 m)	10 ft 0 in (3.05 m)
All values from Pro Day

=== Tennessee Titans ===
After going undrafted in the 2005 NFL draft, Harris was signed by the Tennessee Titans as an undrafted free agent on April 28. He was waived on August 29. The team re-signed him to the practice squad on November 1, where he spent the remainder the season.

Harris was re-signed by the Titans on January 13, 2006. He was waived on September 2 but re-signed to the practice squad the following day, where he spent the entire 2006 regular season.

=== Atlanta Falcons ===
Harris was signed with the Atlanta Falcons on January 10, 2007. He appeared in 13 games for the Falcons in 2007, recording 10 tackles (seven solo) and pass defensed.

In 2008, Harris appeared in 12 games for the Falcons and recorded three tackles. He was placed on season-ending injured reserve with a groin injury on December 9.

Harris was re-signed to a one-year contract on March 3, 2009. On December 21, he was placed on injured reserve due to a knee injury.

=== Philadelphia Eagles ===
Harris was signed by the Philadelphia Eagles on July 29, 2010. He suffered a Lisfranc sprain during a preseason game against the Jacksonville Jaguars on August 14, and was placed on injured reserve on August 15.

Harris now lives in Georgia, US with his wife and two children.
