= Cliff Matthews =

American gridiron football player (born 1989)

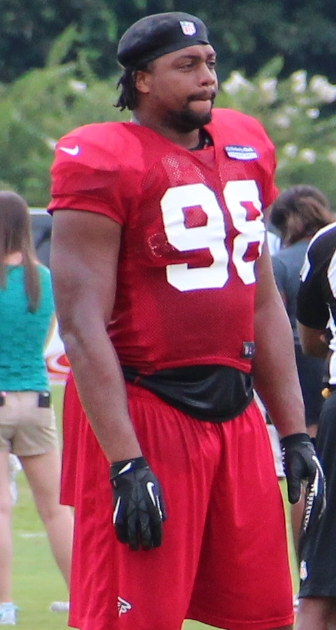
- Matthews with the Atlanta Falcons in 2013

Personal information
- Born: August 5, 1989 (age 37); Cheraw, South Carolina, U.S.
- Listed height: 6 ft 4 in (1.93 m)
- Listed weight: 268 lb (122 kg)

Career information
- High school: Cheraw (SC)
- College: South Carolina
- NFL draft: 2011: 7th round, 230th overall pick

Career history

Playing
- Atlanta Falcons (2011–2015); Tampa Bay Buccaneers (2016)*; Atlanta Falcons (2016); Ottawa Redblacks (2018)*
- * Offseason or practice squad member only

Coaching
- Northview HS (GA) (2018) Defensive line coach; Limestone (2019–2020) Defensive line coach; Atlanta Falcons (2021) Bill Walsh Diversity coaching fellowship; Reinhardt (2021–2023) Defensive line coach; Reinhardt (2024) Co-defensive coordinator & defensive line coach

Awards and highlights
- As a player: Second-team All-SEC (2009, 2010)

Career NFL statistics
- Total tackles: 28
- Stats at Pro Football Reference

Cliff Matthews (born August 5, 1989) is an American football coach and former defensive lineman. He most recently served as the co-defensive coordinator and defensive line coach for Reinhardt University, positions he held in 2024. He was selected by the Atlanta Falcons in the seventh round of the 2011 NFL draft. He played college football at South Carolina.

== Professional career ==
Pre-draft measurables
Height	Weight	Arm length	Hand span	Wingspan	40-yard dash	10-yard split	20-yard split	20-yard shuttle	Three-cone drill	Vertical jump	Broad jump	Bench press
6 ft 3 1/2 in (1.92 m)	257 lb (117 kg)	34 in (0.86 m)	9 3/4 in (0.25 m)	6 ft 10 1/8 in (2.09 m)	4.78 s	1.72 s	2.78 s	4.37 s	7.08 s	32.0 in (0.81 m)	9 ft 4 in (2.84 m)	17 reps
All values from NFL Combine/Pro Day

=== Atlanta Falcons (first stint) ===
Matthews was selected by the Atlanta Falcons in the seventh round (230th overall) of the 2011 NFL draft. He was signed by the team on July 28. Unfortunately, he was injured in the preseason that year. On September 4, 2015, he was released by the Falcons.

=== Tampa Bay Buccaneers ===
On February 5, 2016, Matthews was signed to a future contract by the Tampa Bay Buccaneers. On September 3, 2016, he was released by the Buccaneers as part of final roster cuts.

=== Atlanta Falcons (second stint) ===
On October 19, 2016, Matthews was signed by the Falcons. He was released by the Falcons on December 6, 2016.

=== Ottawa Redblacks ===
On January 8, 2018, Matthews signed with the Ottawa Redblacks of the Canadian Football League. On May 19, 2018, he was transferred to the retired list.
