= Jose Valdez (American football) =

American gridiron football player (born 1986)

No. 65
- Position: Offensive tackle

Personal information
- Born: December 13, 1986 (age 39); St. Francis, Wisconsin
- Listed height: 6 ft 6 in (1.98 m)
- Listed weight: 330 lb (150 kg)

Career information
- College: Arkansas
- NFL draft: 2009: undrafted

Career history
- Atlanta Falcons (2009–2011)*; Minnesota Vikings (2011)*; St. Louis Rams (2012)*; Saskatchewan Roughriders (2013)*
- * Offseason or practice squad member only
- Stats at Pro Football Reference

José Valdez is an American former football offensive lineman. He was a member of the Atlanta Falcons, Minnesota Vikings, St. Louis Rams and Saskatchewan Roughriders
