= Lawrence Sidbury =

American football player (born 1986)

No. 59, 77, 90
- Position: Defensive end

Personal information
- Born: February 6, 1986 (age 40); Cheltenham, Maryland, U.S.
- Listed height: 6 ft 2 in (1.88 m)
- Listed weight: 267 lb (121 kg)

Career information
- High school: Oxon Hill (Oxon Hill, Maryland)
- College: Richmond
- NFL draft: 2009: 4th round, 125th overall pick

Career history
- Atlanta Falcons (2009–2012); Indianapolis Colts (2013); Houston Texans (2014)*; Tampa Bay Buccaneers (2014–2015)
- * Offseason or practice squad member only

Awards and highlights
- 2× first-team All-CAA (2007, 2008); 2007 VaSID first-team All-State

Career NFL statistics
- Total tackles: 18
- Sacks: 5.0
- Fumble recoveries: 1
- Stats at Pro Football Reference

Lawrence Sidbury, Jr. (born February 6, 1986) is an American former professional football player who was a defensive end in the National Football League (NFL). He played college football for the Richmond Spiders and was selected by the Atlanta Falcons in the fourth round of the 2009 NFL draft.

== Early life ==
Sidbury was born in Cheltenham, Maryland and attended Oxon Hill High School in Oxon Hill, Maryland. While there, he was a three-year starter on the football team and served as a team captain for his final two seasons. As a senior in 2004, Sidbury earned All-State, honorable mention All-Met, All-County, and All-League honors. He earned a position on the Washington, D.C. Golden 11 Team and played in the Prince George's County All-Star Game.

In high school, he was an honor roll student in the science and vo-tech program. He also competed in track & field and finished second in the state in shot put.

== College career ==
Sidbury spent his true freshman year on redshirt status. In 2005, he played in 13 games including one start, and recorded 24 tackles including four for loss, and three sacks for 12 yards. Sidbury played as part of the Richmond defense which was ranked fourth in the Colonial Athletic Association (CAA) and 38th nationally, allowing a total of 339.3 yards per game. Richmond was ranked 22nd in the nation against the rush, allowing 120.1 yards per game on the ground.

In 2006, Sidbury saw action in nine games. He recorded 17 tackles, including 5.5 for loss, and one sack. That year, the Richmond defense was ranked 21st in the nation against the run, allowing 115.9 rushing yards per game, and 26th in scoring defense, allowing 18.1 points per game.

In 2007, Sidbury started in 13 games. He recorded 8.5 tackles for loss and five quarterback sacks. He helped the Spiders defense limit opponents to an average of 152.5 rushing yards per game. Sidbury was named a first-team All-CAA and Virginia College Sports Information Directors (VaSID) first-team All-State player.

In 2008, he played as part of the Richmond team that won the Division I FCS National Championship. Sidbury saw action in all 16 games, and recorded 56 tackles, including 26 solo and 20 for a loss of 80 yards. He also accumulated 11.5 quarterback sacks for 61 yards. Sidbury broke up two passes, accounted for four quarterback hurries, forced three fumbles, and recovered one fumble. He recorded four sacks in the FCS championship game. Sidbury was awarded first-team All-CAA honors. After the season, he participated in the 2009 Senior Bowl and 2009 East–West Shrine Game, and accounted himself well for NFL scouts. He most effective technique in rushing the quarterback was a spin move nicknamed the "Sidbury Spin".

== Professional career ==
=== Pre-draft ===
The NFL Draft Scout ranked him as eighth of 197 defensive end prospects and projected him being selected in the third round of the 2009 NFL draft. Scouts at the NFL Combine were reportedly impressed by his 4.57-second 40-yard dash, large hands, and arm length.

Pre-draft measurables
Height	Weight	40-yard dash	10-yard split	20-yard split	20-yard shuttle	Three-cone drill	Vertical jump	Broad jump	Bench press	Wonderlic
6 ft 2 3/8 in (1.89 m)	261 lb (118 kg)	4.64 s	1.53 s	2.63 s	4.43 s	7.46 s	35 in (0.89 m)	10 ft 0 in (3.05 m)	28 reps	22
All values from NFL Combine.

=== Atlanta Falcons ===
Sidbury was taken by the Atlanta Falcons in the 4th round of the 2009 NFL draft (125th overall). He became the second Spider to be taken by Atlanta, joining Ray Easterling in 1972.

Sidbury got his first career sack versus the Philadelphia Eagles by sacking Donovan McNabb. He finished the game with 3 tackles.

On December 27, Sidbury stripped the ball from Fred Jackson of the Buffalo Bills, and returned it 11 yards for a touchdown.

He finished the season with 5 tackles including a sack and a fumble recovery for a touchdown. He played in all 16 games.

=== Indianapolis Colts ===
Sidbury signed with the Indianapolis Colts on March 12, 2013. On August 25, 2013, the Colts placed him on the injured reserve list due to a shoulder injury.

=== Houston Texans ===
Sidbury signed with the Houston Texans in July 2014. The Texans released Sidbury on August 25, 2014.

=== Tampa Bay Buccaneers ===
Sidbury signed with the Tampa Bay Buccaneers on December 17, 2014. On March 9, 2015, he was re-signed by the Buccaneers. On September 5, 2015, Sidbury was released. On November 4, 2015, he was signed. On November 10, 2015, he was waived. On November 18, 2015, he re-signed with the Buccaneers. On November 23, 2015, he was waived.
