= Spencer Adkins =

American football player (born 1987)

No. 59
- Position: Linebacker

Personal information
- Born: May 16, 1987 (age 39); Naples, Florida, U.S.
- Listed height: 5 ft 11 in (1.80 m)
- Listed weight: 242 lb (110 kg)

Career information
- High school: Naples
- College: Miami (FL)
- NFL draft: 2009: 6th round, 176th overall pick

Career history
- Atlanta Falcons (2009−2011); Baltimore Ravens (2013)*; New York Giants (2014)*
- * Offseason or practice squad member only

Career NFL statistics
- Total tackles: 15
- Stats at Pro Football Reference

Spencer Adkins (born May 16, 1987) is an American former professional football player who was a linebacker in the National Football League (NFL). Adkins played college football for the Miami Hurricanes and was selected by the Atlanta Falcons in the sixth round of 2009 NFL draft.

== Early life ==
Adkins was born to Lester and Mable Adkins and attended Naples High School in Naples, Florida, and played for the Golden Eagles football team under Bill Kramer. In fact, Adkins didn't begin playing until high school. He started playing on varsity as a defensive end as a sophomore, but the next year, moved up to linebacker and had 80 tackles and 12 sacks as Naples reached the state championship game. As a senior in 2004, he made 11 sacks (four in one game) and 19 tackles for a loss. He was awarded the Naples Daily News Broxson Trophy for best area player, and was All-State. He was a four-star recruit and signed to the University of Miami.

== College career ==
Adkins saw action in 31 collegiate games at the University of Miami. He totaled 72 tackles, 10 tackles for loss, five sacks and one interception. In 2007, he recorded a career-high 52 tackles. He majored in Psychology.

== Professional career ==
Signed with agent Ken Sarnoff. Adkins was selected by the Falcons in the sixth round of 2009 NFL draft. and signed on June 24. However, his contract was disapproved by the NFL because of "language oversight" relating to team incentives and individual "not likely to be earned" incentives. Adkins was one of the five previous defensive selections in the 2009 Draft by the Falcons and was the first linebacker taken by the team. Adkins boosted his stock by a solid performance at Miami's Pro Day: he ran 40 yards in 4.43 seconds, broad jumped 10-2, vertical jumped 36 1/2 inches and bench pressed 225 pounds a total of 30 times.
