= Paul Dunn (American football coach) =

American football player and coach (born 1960)

Profile
- Position: Offensive guard

Personal information
- Born: July 7, 1960 (age 66); Philadelphia, Pennsylvania, U.S.

Career information
- College: Pittsburgh
- NFL draft: 1983: undrafted

Career history
- Pittsburgh (1983) (GA); Penn State (1984–1985) (GA); Edinboro (1986–1988) (OL); Rutgers (1989) (OL); Maine (1990–1992) (OL); Maine (1993) (OC); Cincinnati (1994–1995) (OL); Vanderbilt (1996–1997) (OL); Kansas State (1998–2002) (OL/RGC); Kentucky (2003–2004) (OL/RGC); Pittsburgh (2005–2007) (OL); Atlanta Falcons (2008–2011) (assistant OL); Atlanta Falcons (2012–2013) (OL); Houston Texans (2014) (OL); Montreal Alouettes (2018–2019) (OL/RGC); Munich Ravens (2023–present) (OL)

Paul Dunn (born July 7, 1960) is an American former football offensive guard and coach. He played college football at the University of Pittsburgh.

== College career ==
Dunn was a three-year letterman as an offensive guard for the Pittsburgh Panthers from 1978 to 1982.

== Coaching career ==
Dunn started coaching as a graduate assistant for the Pittsburgh Panthers in 1983 and was also a graduate assistant for the Penn State Nittany Lions from 1984 to 1985.

He served as the offensive line coach of the Edinboro Fighting Scots from 1986 to 1988, the Rutgers Scarlet Knights in 1989, and the Maine Black Bears from 1990 to 1992. He was promoted to offensive coordinator in 1993, but fired at the end of the season. He then served as the offensive line coach of the Cincinnati Bearcats from 1994 to 1995 and the Vanderbilt Commodores from 1996 to 1997.

Dunn was running game coordinator and offensive line coach for the Kansas State Wildcats from 1998 to 2002 and served in the same two roles for the Kentucky Wildcats from 2003 to 2004.

He was offensive line coach of the Pittsburgh Panthers from 2005 to 2007.

Dunn served as assistant offensive line coach of the Atlanta Falcons from 2008 to 2011 and offensive line coach from 2012 to 2013. He was dismissed by the Falcons on December 30, 2013.

Dunn was offensive line coach for the Houston Texans in 2014. He was dismissed by the Texans on January 8, 2015.

He was the offensive line coach and run game coordinator of the Montreal Alouettes of the Canadian Football League from 2018 to 2019.

In 2023, he became the offensive line coach for the Munich Ravens of the European League of Football.
