= 2013 Atlanta Falcons season =

NFL team season

- Owner: Arthur Blank
- General manager: Thomas Dimitroff
- Head coach: Mike Smith
- Home stadium: Georgia Dome

Results
- Record: 4–12
- Division place: 3rd NFC South
- Playoffs: Did not qualify
- Pro Bowlers: TE Tony Gonzalez

Uniform
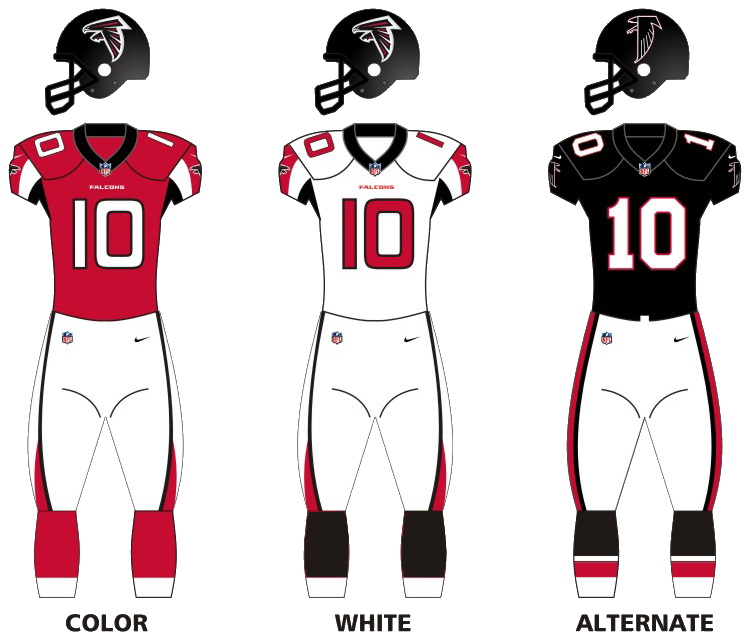

The 2013 season was the Atlanta Falcons' 48th in the National Football League (NFL) and their sixth under head coach Mike Smith. The Falcons entered the season as one of the Super Bowl favorites; however, due to multiple key injuries to the team, the Falcons failed to improve on their 13–3 season from 2012, finishing 4–12. They did not qualify for postseason contention for the first time since 2009 and secured the Falcons' first losing season since 2007.

== 2013 draft class ==
2013 Atlanta Falcons Draft
Round	Selection	Player	Position	College
1	22^{[a]}	Desmond Trufant	CB	Washington
2	60	Robert Alford	CB	Southeastern Louisiana
4	127	Malliciah Goodman	DE	Clemson
4	133^{[b]}	Levine Toilolo	TE	Stanford
5	153^{[c]}	Stansly Maponga	DE	TCU
7^{[c]}	243^{[b]}	Kemal Ishmael	S	Central Florida
7^{[c]}	244^{[b]}	Zeke Motta	S	Notre Dame
7^{[c]}	249^{[b]}	Sean Renfree	QB	Duke

Notes

^{^[a]} The Falcons traded their first- (No. 30 overall), third (No. 92 overall) and sixth- (No. 198 overall) round selections to the St. Louis Rams in exchange for the Rams' 2013 first-round selection (No. 22 overall) and a 2015 seventh-round selection.
^{^[b]} Compensatory selection.
^{^[c]} The Falcons traded their fifth- (No. 163 overall) and original seventh- (No. 236 overall) round selections to the Chicago Bears in exchange for the Bears' fifth-round selection (No. 153 overall).

== Staff ==
2013 Atlanta Falcons staff
Front office: Owner/chairman – Arthur Blank; President/CEO – Rich McKay; General manager – Thomas Dimitroff; Director of player personnel – Lionel Vital; Director of football administration – Nick Polk; Director of pro scouting – DeJuan Polk; Director of college scouting – Steve Sabo; Head coaches: Head coach – Mike Smith; Assistant head coach/wide receivers – Terry Robiskie; Offensive coaches: Offensive coordinator – Dirk Koetter; Quarterbacks – Glenn Thomas; Running backs – Gerald Brown; Tight ends – Chris Scelfo; Offensive line – Pat Hill; Offensive line – Paul Dunn; Offensive assistant – Andrew Weidinger	Defensive coaches: Defensive coordinator – Mike Nolan; Defensive line – Ray Hamilton; Linebackers – Glenn Pires; Defensive backs – Joe Danna; Secondary – Tim Lewis; Defensive assistant – Mark Collins; Special teams coaches: Special teams coordinator – Keith Armstrong; Assistant special teams – Eric Sutulovich; Strength and conditioning: Head strength and conditioning – A. J. Neibel; Strength and conditioning assistant – Jonas Beauchemin

== Final roster ==
2013 Atlanta Falcons roster
Quarterbacks (QB): 4 Dominique Davis; 2 Matt Ryan; Running backs (RB): 42 Patrick DiMarco FB; 39 Steven Jackson; 32 Jacquizz Rodgers; 35 Antone Smith; 44 Jason Snelling; 30 Josh Vaughan; Wide receivers (WR): 15 Kevin Cone; 19 Drew Davis; 83 Harry Douglas; 13 Darius Johnson; 84 Roddy White; Tight ends (TE): 86 Chase Coffman; 88 Tony Gonzalez; 80 Levine Toilolo	Offensive linemen (OL): 63 Justin Blalock G; 69 Harland Gunn G; 61 Joe Hawley C; 76 Lamar Holmes T; 66 Peter Konz G/C; 74 Terren Jones T; 77 Sean Locklear T; 75 Garrett Reynolds G; 73 Ryan Schraeder T; 65 Jeremy Trueblood T; Defensive linemen (DL): 95 Jonathan Babineaux DT; 93 Malliciah Goodman DE; 94 Peria Jerry DT; 99 Stansly Maponga DE; 96 Jonathan Massaquoi DE; 98 Cliff Matthews DE; 67 Adam Replogle DT; 92 Travian Robertson DT; 50 Osi Umenyiora DE	Linebackers (LB): 59 Joplo Bartu OLB; 52 Akeem Dent MLB; 53 Omar Gaither OLB; 54 Stephen Nicholas OLB; 56 Sean Weatherspoon OLB; 55 Paul Worrilow MLB; Defensive backs (DB): 23 Robert Alford CB; 29 Sean Baker SS; 28 Thomas DeCoud FS; 24 Dominique Franks CB; 36 Kemal Ishmael FS; 27 Robert McClain CB; 25 William Moore SS; 22 Asante Samuel CB; 21 Desmond Trufant CB; Special teams (ST): 5 Matt Bosher P; 3 Matt Bryant K; 47 Josh Harris LS	Practice squad: 14 Dominique Croom WR; 9 Seth Doege QB; 43 Jordan Mabin CB; 18 James Rodgers WR; 81 Mickey Shuler, Jr. TE; 49 Chase Thomas OLB; Reserve: 72 Sam Baker T (IR); 71 Kroy Biermann DE (IR); 34 Bradie Ewing FB (IR); 79 Mike Johnson T (IR); 11 Julio Jones WR (IR); 26 Saeed Lee CB (IR); 41 Zeke Motta SS (IR); 82 Adam Nissley TE (IR); 91 Corey Peters DT (IR); 12 Sean Renfree QB (IR); 85 Andrew Szczerba TE (IR); Rookies in italics 53 active, 11 reserve, 6 practice squad

== Depth chart ==
Defense

FS
Thomas DeCoud
Charles Mitchell
Kemal Ishmael

WLB	MLB	SLB
⋅	Akeem Dent	⋅
Nick Clancy	Pat Schiller	⋅
Joplo Bartu	Brian Banks	⋅

SS
William Moore
Shann Schillinger
Zeke Motta

CB
Asante Samuel
Robert Alford
Peyton Thompson

DE	DT	DT	DE
Osi Umenyiora	Peria Jerry	Jonathan Babineaux	Kroy Biermann
Jonathan Massaquoi	Corey Peters	Travian Robertson	Malliciah Goodman
Stansly Maponga	Micanor Regis	Adam Replogle	Cliff Matthews

CB
Desmond Trufant
Robert McClain
Dominique Franks

Offense

WR
Julio Jones
Harry Douglas
Kevin Cone

LT	LG	C	RG	RT
Sam Baker	Justin Blalock	Peter Konz	Garrett Reynolds	Lamar Holmes
Alec Savoie	Jacques McClendon	Joe Hawley	Phillipkeith Manley	Mike Johnson
Ryan Schraeder	Theo Goins	Matt Smith	Harland Gunn	Terren Jones

TE
Tony Gonzalez
Chase Coffman
Levine Toilolo

WR
Roddy White
Drew Davis
Tim Toone

QB
Matt Ryan
Dominique Davis
Sean Renfree

Key reserves
TE Adam Nissley

RB
Steven Jackson
Jacquizz Rodgers
Jason Snelling

FB
Bradie Ewing
Patrick DiMarco
DeVonte Campbell

Special teams
PK Matt Bryant
PK Jeremy Shelley
P Matt Bosher
P Sean Sellwood
KR Jacquizz Rodgers
PR Dominique Franks
LS Josh Harris
H Matt Bosher

== Schedule ==
=== Preseason ===
Week	Date	Opponent	Result	Record	Venue	Recap
1	August 8	Cincinnati Bengals	**L** 10–34	0–1	Georgia Dome	Recap
2	August 15	at Baltimore Ravens	**L** 23–27	0–2	M&T Bank Stadium	Recap
3	August 24	at Tennessee Titans	**L** 16–27	0–3	LP Field	Recap
4	August 29	Jacksonville Jaguars	**L** 16–20	0–4	Georgia Dome	Recap

=== Regular season ===
Week	Date	Opponent	Result	Record	Venue	Recap
1	September 8	at **New Orleans Saints**	**L** 17–23	0–1	Mercedes-Benz Superdome	Recap
2	September 15	St. Louis Rams	**W** 31–24	1–1	Georgia Dome	Recap
3	September 22	at Miami Dolphins	**L** 23–27	1–2	Sun Life Stadium	Recap
4	September 29	New England Patriots	**L** 23–30	1–3	Georgia Dome	Recap
5	October 7	New York Jets	**L** 28–30	1–4	Georgia Dome	Recap
6	Bye					
7	October 20	**Tampa Bay Buccaneers**	**W** 31–23	2–4	Georgia Dome	Recap
8	October 27	at Arizona Cardinals	**L** 13–27	2–5	University of Phoenix Stadium	Recap
9	November 3	at **Carolina Panthers**	**L** 10–34	2–6	Bank of America Stadium	Recap
10	November 10	Seattle Seahawks	**L** 10–33	2–7	Georgia Dome	Recap
11	November 17	at **Tampa Bay Buccaneers**	**L** 28–41	2–8	Raymond James Stadium	Recap
12	November 21	**New Orleans Saints**	**L** 13–17	2–9	Georgia Dome	Recap
13	December 1	at Buffalo Bills	**W** 34–31 (OT)	3–9	(Canada) Rogers Centre (Toronto)	Recap
14	December 8	at Green Bay Packers	**L** 21–22	3–10	Lambeau Field	Recap
15	December 15	Washington Redskins	**W** 27–26	4–10	Georgia Dome	Recap
16	December 23	at San Francisco 49ers	**L** 24–34	4–11	Candlestick Park	Recap
17	December 29	**Carolina Panthers**	**L** 20–21	4–12	Georgia Dome	Recap

Note: Intra-division opponents are in bold text.

# Indicates that the Falcons were the visiting team in the Bills Toronto Series.

=== Game summaries ===
==== Week 1: at New Orleans Saints ====
Week One: Atlanta Falcons at New Orleans Saints – Game summary

Quarter	1	2	3	4	Total
Falcons	10	0	7	0	**17**
**Saints**	0	13	7	3	**23**

at Mercedes-Benz Superdome, New Orleans, Louisiana

- Date: September 8
- Game time: 1:00 p.m. EDT/12:00 p.m. CDT
- Game weather: Played indoors (dome stadium)
- Game attendance: 72,348
- Referee: Gene Steratore
- TV announcers (Fox): Kenny Albert, Daryl Johnston and Tony Siragusa
- Recap, Game book

The Falcons would travel to New Orleans to open their season. The Falcons would carry a 17-13 lead into the fourth quarter, but the Saints would score a touchdown with 6:22 remaining. The Falcons would try to rally, but the comeback fell short, as the Saints would add a field goal to win 23-17. With the loss, the Falcons started their season 0-1 for the second time in 3 seasons.

==== Week 2: vs. St. Louis Rams ====
Week Two: St. Louis Rams at Atlanta Falcons – Game summary

Quarter	1	2	3	4	Total
Rams	0	3	7	14	**24**
**Falcons**	14	10	0	7	**31**

at Georgia Dome, Atlanta, Georgia

- Date: September 15
- Game time: 1:00 p.m. EDT
- Game weather: Played indoors (dome stadium)
- Game attendance: 70,056
- Referee: Scott Green
- TV announcers (Fox): Kenny Albert, Daryl Johnston and Tony Siragusa
- Recap, Game book

The Falcons would return to Atlanta for their home opener against the Rams. The Falcons would have a big first half, cruising to a 24-3 lead at halftime. St. Louis would try to come back, and outscored Atlanta 21-7 in the second half, but it was not enough as the Falcons held on for the win. With the win, the Falcons evened their record at 1-1.

==== Week 3: at Miami Dolphins ====
Week Three: Atlanta Falcons at Miami Dolphins – Game summary

Quarter	1	2	3	4	Total
Falcons	7	6	7	3	**23**
**Dolphins**	0	10	10	7	**27**

at Sun Life Stadium, Miami Gardens, Florida

- Date: September 22
- Game time: 4:05 p.m. EDT
- Game weather: 89 °F (32 °C), cloudy
- Game attendance: 70,660
- Referee: Ron Winter
- TV announcers (Fox): Chris Myers, Tim Ryan and Jennifer Hale
- Recap, Game book

The Falcons would lead the entire game until the Dolphins went down to score the game-winning touchdown with 38 seconds remaining. The Falcons would try to go down to the end zone to pull out the win, but they would not, and the Falcons would lose 27-23 to the Miami Dolphins. With the loss, the Falcons fell to 1-2.

==== Week 4: vs. New England Patriots ====
Week Four: New England Patriots at Atlanta Falcons – Game summary

Quarter	1	2	3	4	Total
**Patriots**	0	10	3	17	**30**
Falcons	3	7	0	13	**23**

at Georgia Dome, Atlanta, Georgia

- Date: September 29
- Game time: 8:30 p.m. EDT
- Game weather: Played indoors (dome stadium)
- Game attendance: 70,744
- Referee: Walt Coleman
- TV announcers (NBC): Al Michaels, Cris Collinsworth and Michele Tafoya
- Recap, Game book

The Falcons would go back home for a Sunday Night Football game against the New England Patriots. The Falcons would put up a good fight, but they would lose a close shootout against the undefeated Patriots. With the loss, the Falcons fell to 1-3. This was their 4th loss to New England since 2001.

==== Week 5: vs. New York Jets ====
Week Five: New York Jets at Atlanta Falcons – Game summary

Quarter	1	2	3	4	Total
**Jets**	3	14	3	10	**30**
Falcons	0	7	7	14	**28**

at Georgia Dome, Atlanta, Georgia

- Date: October 7
- Game time: 8:40 p.m. EDT
- Game weather: Played indoors (dome stadium)
- Game attendance: 70,246
- Referee: Bill Leavy
- TV announcers (ESPN): Mike Tirico, Jon Gruden and Lisa Salters
- Recap, Game book

The Falcons would go down the field to score with 1:54 remaining on a Matt Bryant field goal. However, the Jets would go down and kick a field goal as time expired to give the Jets the win. With the loss, the Falcons fell to 1-4 for the first time since 2007.

==== Week 7: vs. Tampa Bay Buccaneers ====
Week Seven: Tampa Bay Buccaneers at Atlanta Falcons – Game summary

Quarter	1	2	3	4	Total
Buccaneers	0	10	7	6	**23**
**Falcons**	7	17	0	7	**31**

at Georgia Dome, Atlanta, Georgia

- Date: October 20
- Game time: 1:00 p.m. EDT
- Game weather: Played indoors (dome stadium)
- Game attendance: 69,522
- Referee: Walt Anderson
- TV announcers (Fox): Kevin Burkhardt, John Lynch and Molly McGrath
- Recap, Game book

Game information

**First quarter**

- ATL – Thomas DeCoud 30-yard fumble return (Matt Bryant kick), 11:54. Falcons 7–0.

**Second quarter**

- ATL – Jacquizz Rodgers 19-yard pass from Matt Ryan (Matt Bryant kick), 13:23. Falcons 14–0. **Drive: 8 plays, 83 yards, 4:23.**
- TB – Vincent Jackson 59-yard pass from Mike Glennon (Rian Lindell kick), 11:54. Falcons 14–7. **Drive: 3 plays, 80 yards, 1:29.**
- ATL – Matt Bryant 23-yard field goal, 7:38. Falcons 17–7. **Drive: 10 plays, 78 yards, 4:16.**
- ATL – Harry Douglas 37-yard pass from Matt Ryan (Matt Bryant kick), 5:32. Falcons 24–7. **Drive: 1 play, 37 yards, 0:08.**
- TB – Rian Lindell 36-yard field goal, 0:00. Falcons 24–10. **Drive: 13 plays, 63 yards, 5:32.**

**Third quarter**

- TB – Vincent Jackson 1-yard pass from Mike Glennon (Rian Lindell kick), 9:03. Falcons 24–17. **Drive: 9 plays, 23 yards, 4:12.**

**Fourth quarter**

- ATL – Jacquizz Rodgers 8-yard pass from Matt Ryan (Matt Bryant kick), 14:06. Falcons 31–17. **Drive: 8 plays, 80 yards, 3:48.**
- TB – Rian Lindell 41-yard field goal, 5:00. Falcons 31–20. **Drive: 18 plays, 55 yards, 9:06.**
- TB – Rian Lindell 35-yard field goal, 1:55. Falcons 31–23. **Drive: 7 plays, 43 yards, 1:56.**

**Top passers**

- TB – Mike Glennon – 26/44, 256 yards, 2 TD
- ATL – Matt Ryan – 20/26, 273 yards, 3 TD

**Top rushers**

- TB – Doug Martin – 11 rushes, 47 yards
- ATL – Jacquizz Rodgers – 8 rushes, 16 yards

**Top receivers**

- TB – Vincent Jackson – 10 receptions, 138 yards, 2 TD
- ATL – Harry Douglas – 7 receptions, 149 yards, TD

The Falcons would stay home for a divisional game against winless Tampa Bay. The Falcons would never trail during the game, and they would win this game 31-23. The Falcons cruised to a 24-10 lead at halftime, and held off a second half Tampa Bay rally for the victory.

With the win, the Falcons improved to 2-4 while sending Tampa Bay to 0-7.

==== Week 8: at Arizona Cardinals ====
Week Eight: Atlanta Falcons at Arizona Cardinals – Game summary

Quarter	1	2	3	4	Total
Falcons	3	3	0	7	**13**
**Cardinals**	0	21	3	3	**27**

at University of Phoenix Stadium, Glendale, Arizona

- Date: October 27
- Game time: 4:25 p.m. EDT/1:25 p.m. Arizona time
- Game weather: Played indoors (retractable roof closed)
- Game attendance: 60,671
- Referee: Mike Carey
- TV announcers (Fox): Kevin Burkhardt, John Lynch and Molly McGrath
- Recap, Game book

Game information

**First quarter**

**Second quarter**

**Third quarter**

**Fourth quarter**

**Top passers**

- ATL – Matt Ryan – 34/61, 301 yards, TD, 4 INT
- ARI – Carson Palmer – 13/18, 172 yards, 2 TD, INT

**Top rushers**

- ATL – Matt Ryan – rush CAR, 13 yards
- ARI – Andre Ellington – 15 CAR, 154 yards, TD

**Top receivers**

- ATL – Harry Douglas – 12 REC, 121 yards
- ARI – Teddy Williams – 1 REC, 51 yards

The Falcons would travel to Arizona to take on the Cardinals. The Falcons would struggle all game, committing 4 turnovers (all interceptions by Matt Ryan) as they lost 27-13. With the loss, the Falcons fell to 2-5.

==== Week 9: at Carolina Panthers ====
Week Nine: Atlanta Falcons at Carolina Panthers – Game summary

Quarter	1	2	3	4	Total
Falcons	0	10	0	0	**10**
**Panthers**	7	7	3	17	**34**

at Bank of America Stadium, Charlotte, North Carolina

- Date: November 3
- Game time: 1:00 p.m. EST
- Game weather: 62 °F (17 °C), sunny
- Game attendance: 73,720
- Referee: Tony Corrente
- TV announcers (Fox): Thom Brennaman, Brian Billick and Laura Okmin
- Recap, Game book

The Falcons would go to Carolina for a showdown with the Panthers. The Falcons would once again struggle as they would commit 4 turnovers for the second straight week as they lost 34-10 to Carolina. With the loss, the Falcons fell to 2-6.

==== Week 10: vs. Seattle Seahawks ====
Week Ten: Seattle Seahawks at Atlanta Falcons – Game summary

Quarter	1	2	3	4	Total
**Seahawks**	3	20	3	7	**33**
Falcons	0	3	7	0	**10**

at Georgia Dome, Atlanta, Georgia

- Date: November 10
- Game time: 1:00 p.m. EST
- Game weather: Played indoors (dome stadium)
- Game attendance: 70,309
- Referee: Bill Vinovich
- TV announcers (Fox): Kevin Burkhardt, John Lynch and Erin Andrews
- Recap, Game book

In a rematch of last seasons divisional game, the Falcons went down easily this time to Seattle, losing 33-10. With the loss, the Falcons fell to 2-7.

==== Week 11: at Tampa Bay Buccaneers ====
Week Eleven: Atlanta Falcons at Tampa Bay Buccaneers – Game summary

Quarter	1	2	3	4	Total
Falcons	0	6	7	15	**28**
**Buccaneers**	3	21	14	3	**41**

at Raymond James Stadium, Tampa, Florida

- Date: November 17
- Game time: 1:00 p.m. EST
- Game weather: 79 °F (26 °C), cloudy
- Game attendance: 55,360
- Referee: Ed Hochuli
- TV announcers (Fox): Sam Rosen, Heath Evans and Peter Schrager
- Recap, Game book

Game information

**First quarter**

- TB – Rian Lindell 30-yard field goal, 1:45. Buccaneers 3–0. **Drive: 15 plays, 73 yards, 7:06.**

**Second quarter**

- ATL – Matt Bryant 46-yard field goal, 12:07. Tied 3–3. **Drive: 10 plays, 53 yards, 4:38.**
- TB – Bobby Rainey 43-yard run (Rian Lindell kick), 10:14. Buccaneers 10–3. **Drive: 4 plays, 81 yards, 1:53.**
- TB – Mason Foster 37-yard interception return (Rian Lindell kick), 7:05. Buccaneers 17–3.
- TB – Bobby Rainey 3-yard run (Rian Lindell kick), 3:16. Buccaneers 24–3. **Drive: 5 plays, 53 yards, 1:46.**
- ATL – Matt Bryant 49-yard field goal, 0:56. Buccaneers 24–6. **Drive: 8 plays, 49 yards, 2:20.**

**Third quarter**

- TB – Bobby Rainey 4-yard pass from Mike Glennon (Rian Lindell kick), 9:34. Buccaneers 31–6. **Drive: 4 plays, 67 yards, 2:02.**
- TB – Vincent Jackson 3-yard pass from Mike Glennon (Rian Lindell kick), 1:54. Buccaneers 38–6. **Drive: 7 plays, 20 yards, 3:49.**
- ATL – Harry Douglas 80-yard pass from Matt Ryan (Matt Bryant kick), 1:02. Buccaneers 38–13. **Drive: 2 plays, 80 yards, 0:52.**

**Fourth quarter**

- TB – Rian Lindell 46-yard field goal, 7:15. Buccaneers 41–13. **Drive: 9 plays, 27 yards, 6:11.**
- ATL – Antone Smith 50-yard run (Dominique Davis–Tony Gonzalez pass), 5:22. Buccaneers 41–21. **Drive: 6 plays, 80 yards, 1:53.**
- ATL – Roddy White 6-yard pass from Matt Ryan (Matt Bryant kick), 1:45. Buccaneers 41–28. **Drive: 8 plays, 80 yards, 1:55.**

**Top passers**

- ATL – Matt Ryan – 19/36, 254 yards, 2 TD, 2 INT
- TB – Mike Glennon – 20/23, 231 yards, 2 TD

**Top rushers**

- ATL – Antone Smith – 2 rushes, 88 yards, TD
- TB – Bobby Rainey – 30 rushes, 163 yards, 2 TD

**Top receivers**

- ATL – Harry Douglas – 6 receptions, 134 yards, TD
- TB – Vincent Jackson – 10 receptions, 165 yards, TD

The Falcons traveled to Tampa Bay for game 2 against the Bucs. The Falcons would suffer a mountain of embarrassment, as they lost 41-28 to the one-win Buccaneers. It was the most points the Buccaneers had scored in a single game all season, and the most points the Falcons had surrendered in a single game all season.

With the loss, the Falcons fell to 2-8.

==== Week 12: vs. New Orleans Saints ====
Week Twelve: New Orleans Saints at Atlanta Falcons – Game summary

Quarter	1	2	3	4	Total
**Saints**	7	7	3	0	**17**
Falcons	7	6	0	0	**13**

at Georgia Dome, Atlanta, Georgia

- Date: November 21
- Game time: 8:25 p.m. EST
- Game weather: Played indoors (dome stadium)
- Game attendance: 70,422
- Referee: Ron Winter
- TV announcers (NFLN): Brad Nessler, Mike Mayock and Alex Flanagan
- Recap, Game book

With the loss, coupled with wins by the Cardinals, 49ers and the Panthers, the Falcons were the first team this season to be eliminated from playoff contention.

==== Week 13: at Buffalo Bills ====
Bills Toronto Series

Week Thirteen: Atlanta Falcons at Buffalo Bills – Game summary

Quarter	1	2	3	4	OT	Total
**Falcons**	7	10	7	7	3	**34**
Bills	14	3	7	7	0	**31**

at Rogers Centre, Toronto, Ontario, Canada

- Date: December 1
- Game time: 4:05 p.m. EST
- Game weather: Played indoors (retractable roof closed)
- Game attendance: 38,969
- Referee: Walt Anderson
- TV announcers (Fox): Dick Stockton, Ronde Barber and Kris Budden
- Recap, Game book

In this game, the Falcons would travel to Toronto for their game against the Bills, as it was the Bills Toronto game for the 2013 season. The Bills would lead 31-24 during the 4th quarter, but the Falcons would go down and score the game-tying touchdown with 1:28 remaining in regulation. In overtime, the Falcons would win on a Matt Bryant field goal to give the Falcons the win. With the win, the Falcons would end their 5-game losing streak and improve to 3-9.

==== Week 14: at Green Bay Packers ====
Week Fourteen: Atlanta Falcons at Green Bay Packers – Game summary

Quarter	1	2	3	4	Total
Falcons	0	21	0	0	**21**
**Packers**	7	3	6	6	**22**

at Lambeau Field, Green Bay, Wisconsin

- Date: December 8
- Game time: 1:00 p.m. EST/12:00 p.m. CST
- Game weather: 9 °F (−13 °C), cloudy
- Game attendance: 77,550
- Referee: Bill Leavy
- TV announcers (Fox): Thom Brennaman, Brian Billick and Laura Okmin
- Recap, Game book

The Falcons would travel to Green Bay for a game against the Packers. The Falcons had a lot of chances to try and get the lead in the fourth quarter, but the Packers would ultimately hold a 22-21 lead for the final 12:01 as the Falcons failed to score in the fourth quarter. With the loss, the Falcons fell to 3-10.

==== Week 15: vs. Washington Redskins ====
Week Fifteen: Washington Redskins at Atlanta Falcons – Game summary

Quarter	1	2	3	4	Total
Redskins	7	13	0	6	**26**
**Falcons**	14	3	7	3	**27**

at Georgia Dome, Atlanta, Georgia

- Date: December 15
- Game time: 1:00 p.m. EST
- Game weather: Played indoors (dome stadium)
- Game attendance: 70,069
- Referee: Gene Steratore
- TV announcers (Fox): Sam Rosen, Heath Evans and Molly McGrath
- Recap, Game book

The Falcons would go home for a battle against 3-10 Washington. The Falcons would win the game 27-26. The Redskins would go down to score with 18 seconds remaining, but mainly since they were 3-10, they tried to go for 2 and give them the lead and ultimately the win. However, the attempt was no good and the Falcons held on. With the win, the Falcons improved to 4-10.

==== Week 16: at San Francisco 49ers ====
Week Sixteen: Atlanta Falcons at San Francisco 49ers – Game summary

Quarter	1	2	3	4	Total
Falcons	0	10	0	14	**24**
**49ers**	3	0	10	21	**34**

at Candlestick Park, San Francisco, California

- Date: December 23
- Game time: 8:40 p.m. EST/5:40 p.m. PST
- Game weather: 60 °F (16 °C), clear
- Game attendance: 69,732
- Referee: Walt Coleman
- TV announcers (ESPN): Mike Tirico, Jon Gruden and Lisa Salters
- Recap, Game book

The Falcons would travel to San Francisco for a Monday Night game against the 49ers. The Falcons had a shot at getting the lead in the 4th quarter, but NaVorro Bowman would return an interception 89 yards for a touchdown to put the game away. With the loss, the Falcons fell to 4-11. The loss also allowed the 49ers to clinch a playoff berth.

==== Week 17: vs. Carolina Panthers ====
Week Seventeen: Carolina Panthers at Atlanta Falcons – Game summary

Quarter	1	2	3	4	Total
**Panthers**	0	14	7	0	**21**
Falcons	7	3	7	3	**20**

at Georgia Dome, Atlanta, Georgia

- Date: December 29
- Game time: 1:00 p.m. EST
- Game weather: Played indoors (dome stadium)
- Game attendance: 70,427
- Referee: John Parry
- TV announcers (Fox): Kevin Burkhardt, John Lynch and Erin Andrews
- Recap, Game book

With the loss, the Falcons finished their season 4-12 being swept by the Panthers for the first time since 1997.

This was the last time the Falcons were swept by the Panthers until 2025.

== Standings ==
=== Division ===
NFC South
	W	L	T	PCT	DIV	CONF	PF	PA	STK
^{(2)} Carolina Panthers	12	4	0	.750	5–1	9–3	366	241	W3
^{(6)} New Orleans Saints	11	5	0	.688	5–1	9–3	414	304	W1
Atlanta Falcons	4	12	0	.250	1–5	3–9	353	443	L2
Tampa Bay Buccaneers	4	12	0	.250	1–5	2–10	288	389	L3

=== Conference ===
NFC
#	Team	Division	W	L	T	PCT	DIV	CONF	SOS	SOV	STK
Division winners
1	Seattle Seahawks	West	13	3	0	.813	4–2	10–2	.490	.445	W1
2	Carolina Panthers	South	12	4	0	.750	5–1	9–3	.494	.451	W3
3	Philadelphia Eagles	East	10	6	0	.625	4–2	9–3	.453	.391	W2
4	Green Bay Packers	North	8	7	1	.531	3–2–1	6–5–1	.453	.371	W1
Wild cards
5	San Francisco 49ers	West	12	4	0	.750	5–1	9–3	.494	.414	W6
6	New Orleans Saints	South	11	5	0	.688	5–1	9–3	.516	.455	W1
Did not qualify for the postseason
7	Arizona Cardinals	West	10	6	0	.625	2–4	6–6	.531	.444	L1
8 (Note: Chicago defeated Dallas head-to-head (Week 14, 45–28).)	Chicago Bears	North	8	8	0	.500	2–4	4–8	.465	.469	L2
9	Dallas Cowboys	East	8	8	0	.500	5–1	7–5	.484	.363	L1
10 (Note: The NY Giants and Detroit finished with a better conference record than St. Louis.) (Note: The NY Giants defeated Detroit head-to-head (Week 16, 23–20 (OT)).)	New York Giants	East	7	9	0	.438	3–3	6–6	.520	.366	W2
11 (Note: Detroit finished with a better conference record than St. Louis.)	Detroit Lions	North	7	9	0	.438	4–2	6–6	.457	.402	L4
12	St. Louis Rams	West	7	9	0	.438	1–5	4–8	.551	.446	L1
13	Minnesota Vikings	North	5	10	1	.344	2–3–1	4–7–1	.512	.450	W1
14 (Note: Atlanta finished with a better conference record than Tampa Bay.)	Atlanta Falcons	South	4	12	0	.250	1–5	3–9	.553	.313	L2
15	Tampa Bay Buccaneers	South	4	12	0	.250	1–5	2–10	.574	.391	L3
16	Washington Redskins	East	3	13	0	.188	0–6	1–11	.516	.438	L8
Tiebreakers (Note: When breaking ties for three or more teams under the NFL's rules, they are first broken within divisions, then comparing only the highest-ranked remaining team from each division.)
