= 2012 Atlanta Falcons season =

NFL team season

- Owner: Arthur Blank
- General manager: Thomas Dimitroff
- Head coach: Mike Smith
- Offensive coordinator: Dirk Koetter
- Defensive coordinator: Mike Nolan
- Home stadium: Georgia Dome

Results
- Record: 13–3
- Division place: 1st NFC South
- Playoffs: Won Divisional Playoffs (vs. Seahawks) 30–28; Lost NFC Championship (vs. 49ers) 24–28
- Pro Bowlers: QB Matt Ryan; WR Julio Jones; TE Tony Gonzalez; FS Thomas DeCoud; SS William Moore

Uniform
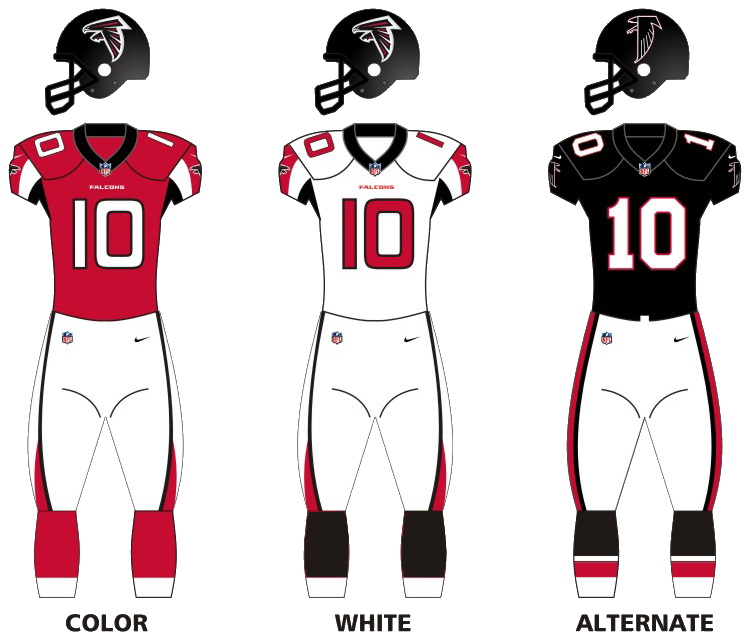

The 2012 season was the Atlanta Falcons' 47th in the National Football League (NFL) and the fifth under head coach Mike Smith. Atlanta started the season 8–0, a franchise best for a start to a season. By beating the Detroit Lions during Week 16, the Falcons clinched homefield advantage throughout the playoffs in the NFC for the second time in three years, and made it to the NFC Championship for the first time since 2004, where they lost 28–24 against the San Francisco 49ers. It was the third straight year in which they did not lose two consecutive regular season games.

== 2012 draft class ==
The Falcons did not have a first- or fourth-round selection.^{[a]}

2012 Atlanta Falcons draft
Round	Pick	Player	Position	College	Notes
2	55	Peter Konz	C	Wisconsin	
3	91	Lamar Holmes	OT	Southern Miss	from Baltimore
5	157	Bradie Ewing	FB	Wisconsin	
5	164	Jonathan Massaquoi	DE	Troy	from Baltimore
6	192	Charles Mitchell	S	Mississippi State	
7 ^{[b]}	249	Travian Robertson	DT	South Carolina	Compensatory selection
Made roster

Notes

^{^[a]} The team traded its first and fourth-round selections, as well as its first-, second-, and fourth-round selections in 2011 to the Cleveland Browns in exchange for Cleveland's first round selection in 2011, used to select wide receiver Julio Jones.
^{^[b]} The team traded its original seventh-round selection (#229 overall) to the Philadelphia Eagles in exchange for cornerback Asante Samuel.

== Staff ==
2012 Atlanta Falcons staff
Front office: Owner/chairman – Arthur Blank; President/CEO – Rich McKay; General manager – Thomas Dimitroff; Director of player personnel – Lionel Vital; Director of pro scouting – DeJuan Polk; Director of football administration – Nick Polk; Head coaches: Head coach – Mike Smith; Offensive coaches: Offensive coordinator – Dirk Koetter; Quarterbacks – Glenn Thomas; Running backs – Gerald Brown; Wide receivers – Terry Robiskie; Tight ends – Chris Scelfo; Offensive line – Pat Hill; Assistant offensive line – Paul Dunn; Offensive assistant – Andrew Weidinger; Assistant to the head coach/offense – Devin Bonik	Defensive coaches: Defensive coordinator – Mike Nolan; Defensive line – Ray Hamilton; Linebackers – Glenn Pires; Defensive backs – Joe Danna; Secondary – Tim Lewis; Defensive assistant – Mark Collins; Special teams coaches: Special teams coordinator – Keith Armstrong; Assistant special teams – Eric Sutulovich; Strength and conditioning: Director of athletic performance – Jeff Fish; Assistant strength and conditioning – Jonas Beauchemin; Assistant strength and conditioning – A. J. Neibel

== Final roster ==
2012 Atlanta Falcons roster
Quarterbacks (QB): 4 Dominique Davis; 12 Luke McCown; 2 Matt Ryan; Running backs (RB): 42 Mike Cox FB; 32 Jacquizz Rodgers; 35 Antone Smith; 44 Jason Snelling; 33 Michael Turner; Wide receivers (WR): 19 Drew Davis; 83 Harry Douglas; 11 Julio Jones; 17 Tim Toone; 84 Roddy White; Tight ends (TE): 86 Chase Coffman; 88 Tony Gonzalez; 81 Michael Palmer	Offensive linemen (OL): 72 Sam Baker T; 63 Justin Blalock G; 77 Tyson Clabo T; 69 Harland Gunn G; 61 Joe Hawley G/C; 76 Lamar Holmes T; 79 Mike Johnson G/T; 66 Peter Konz G; 68 Phillipkeith Manley G; 62 Todd McClure C; Defensive linemen (DL): 55 John Abraham DE/DT; 95 Jonathan Babineaux DT; 71 Kroy Biermann DE; 94 Peria Jerry DT; 96 Jonathan Massaquoi DE; 98 Cliff Matthews DE; 91 Corey Peters DT; 92 Travian Robertson DT; 90 Lawrence Sidbury DE; 99 Vance Walker DT	Linebackers (LB): 52 Akeem Dent MLB; 51 Robert James OLB; 54 Stephen Nicholas OLB; 53 Mike Peterson; 56 Sean Weatherspoon OLB; Defensive backs (DB): 28 Thomas DeCoud FS; 29 Dominique Franks CB; 24 Chris Hope SS; 27 Robert McClain CB; 26 Charles Mitchell FS; 25 William Moore SS; 21 Chris Owens CB; 23 Dunta Robinson CB; 22 Asante Samuel CB; Special teams (ST): 5 Matt Bosher P; 3 Matt Bryant K; 47 Josh Harris LS	Practice squad: 16 Marcus Jackson WR; 65 Jacques McClendon G; 67 Micanor Regis DT; 18 James Rodgers WR; 50 Pat Schiller LB; 85 Andrew Szczerba TE; 37 Peyton Thompson CB; 40 Josh Vaughan RB; Reserve: 15 Kevin Cone WR (IR); 34 Bradie Ewing FB (IR); 87 Tommy Gallarda TE (IR); 20 Brent Grimes CB (IR); 30 Matt Hansen SS (NF-Inj.); 80 Kerry Meier WR (IR); 82 Adam Nissley TE (IR); 75 Garrett Reynolds G (IR); 39 Shann Schillinger FS (IR); 74 Will Svitek T (IR); Rookies in italics 53 active, 10 reserve, 8 practice squad

== Schedule ==
=== Preseason ===
Week	Date	Opponent	Result	Record	Venue	Recap
1	August 9	Baltimore Ravens	L 17–31	0–1	Georgia Dome	Recap
2	August 16	Cincinnati Bengals	L 19–24	0–2	Georgia Dome	Recap
3	August 24	at Miami Dolphins	W 23–6	1–2	Sun Life Stadium	Recap
4	August 30	at Jacksonville Jaguars	L 14–24	1–3	EverBank Field	Recap

=== Regular season ===
Week	Date	Opponent	Result	Record	Venue	Recap
1	September 9	at Kansas City Chiefs	W 40–24	1–0	Arrowhead Stadium	Recap
2	September 17	Denver Broncos	W 27–21	2–0	Georgia Dome	Recap
3	September 23	at San Diego Chargers	W 27–3	3–0	Qualcomm Stadium	Recap
4	September 30	Carolina Panthers	W 30–28	4–0	Georgia Dome	Recap
5	October 7	at Washington Redskins	W 24–17	5–0	FedExField	Recap
6	October 14	Oakland Raiders	W 23–20	6–0	Georgia Dome	Recap
7	Bye					
8	October 28	at Philadelphia Eagles	W 30–17	7–0	Lincoln Financial Field	Recap
9	November 4	Dallas Cowboys	W 19–13	8–0	Georgia Dome	Recap
10	November 11	at New Orleans Saints	L 27–31	8–1	Mercedes-Benz Superdome	Recap
11	November 18	Arizona Cardinals	W 23–19	9–1	Georgia Dome	Recap
12	November 25	at Tampa Bay Buccaneers	W 24–23	10–1	Raymond James Stadium	Recap
13	November 29	New Orleans Saints	W 23–13	11–1	Georgia Dome	Recap
14	December 9	at Carolina Panthers	L 20–30	11–2	Bank of America Stadium	Recap
15	December 16	New York Giants	W 34–0	12–2	Georgia Dome	Recap
16	December 22	at Detroit Lions	W 31–18	13–2	Ford Field	Recap
17	December 30	Tampa Bay Buccaneers	L 17–22	13–3	Georgia Dome	Recap

== Game summaries ==
=== Regular season ===
==== Week 1: at Kansas City Chiefs ====
Week One: Atlanta Falcons at Kansas City Chiefs – Game summary

Quarter	1	2	3	4	Total
Falcons	10	10	14	6	40
Chiefs	3	14	0	7	24

at Arrowhead Stadium, Kansas City, Missouri

- Date: September 9
- Game time: 1:00 p.m. EDT/12:00 p.m. CDT
- Game weather: 69 °F (21 °C), sunny
- Game attendance: 71,180
- Referee: Mike Shepherd
- TV announcers (Fox): Thom Brennaman, Brian Billick and Laura Okmin
- Gamebook

Game information

First quarter

- ATL – Julio Jones 8-yard pass from Matt Ryan (Matt Bryant kick), 8:51. Falcons 7–0. Drive: 12 plays, 80 yards, 6:09.
- KC – Ryan Succop 39-yard field goal, 4:02. Falcons 7–3. Drive: 11 plays, 56 yards, 4:49.
- ATL – Matt Bryant 34-yard field goal, 1:57. Falcons 10–3. Drive: 4 plays, 8 yards, 2:05.

Second quarter

- KC – Kevin Boss 22-yard pass from Matt Cassel (Ryan Succop kick), 11:39. Tied 10–10. Drive: 9 plays, 76 yards, 5:18.
- ATL – Julio Jones 14-yard pass from Matt Ryan (Matt Bryant kick), 7:48. Falcons 17–10. Drive: 8 plays, 73 yards, 3:51.
- KC – Matt Cassel 5-yard run (Ryan Succop kick), 3:38. Tied 17–17. Drive: 8 plays, 80 yards, 4:10.
- ATL – Matt Bryant 21-yard field goal, 0:10. Falcons 20–17. Drive: 11 plays, 77 yards, 3:28.

Third quarter

- ATL – Matt Ryan 5-yard run (Matt Bryant kick), 4:54. Falcons 27–17. Drive: 9 plays, 70 yards, 4:13.
- ATL – Tony Gonzalez 7-yard pass from Matt Ryan (Matt Bryant kick), 3:56. Falcons 34–17. Drive:1 play, 7 yards, 0:06.

Fourth quarter

- ATL – Matt Bryant 30-yard field goal, 14:13. Falcons 37–17. Drive: 5 plays, 31 yards, 2:07.
- ATL – Matt Bryant 41-yard field goal, 10:40. Falcons 40–17. Drive: 4 plays, 8 yards, 2:04.
- KC – Shaun Draughn 4-yard run (Ryan Succop kick), 0:05. Falcons 40–24. Drive: 11 plays, 73 yards, 2:56.

Top passers

- ATL – Matt Ryan – 23/31, 299 yards, 3 TD
- KC – Matt Cassel – 21/33, 258 yards, TD, 2 INT

Top rushers

- ATL – Michael Turner – 11 rushes, 32 yards
- KC – Jamaal Charles – 16 rushes, 87 yards

Top receivers

- ATL – Julio Jones – 6 receptions, 108 yards, 2 TD
- KC – Dexter McCluster – 6 receptions, 82 yards

The Falcons started their season on the road against the Chiefs. They would get on the board first with Matt Ryan's 8-yard touchdown pass to Julio Jones for a 7–0 lead. The Chiefs later got on the board with a 39-yard field goal from Ryan Succop to trim the lead to 7–3. However, the Falcons pushed the lead back to 7 as Matt Bryant would hit a 34-yard field goal to move the Falcons up 10–3. In the 2nd quarter, the Chiefs managed to tie it with Matt Cassel's 22-yard touchdown pass to Kevin Boss to tie the game at 10–10. However, the Falcons retook the lead as Matt Ryan found Julio Jones again for a 14-yard passing touchdown to make the score 17–10. The Chiefs then tied it up with Matt Cassel's 5-yard touchdown run for a score of 17–17, but the Falcons retook the lead again with Matt Bryant kicking a 21-yard field goal for a 20–17 halftime lead. After the break, the Falcons got right back to work as they increased their lead in the third quarter with Matt Ryan's 5-yard touchdown run to move ahead 27–17 then a 7-yard pass from the QB to Tony Gonzalez for a 34–17 lead. Later, 2 field goals from Matt Bryant from 30 and 41 yards out for leads of 37–17 and then 40–17, and basically sealed it. The Chiefs tried to rally a comeback but were only limited to scoring 7 points off of Shaun Draughn's 4-yard touchdown run for a final score of 40–24.

With the win, the Falcons started their season 1–0.

==== Week 2: vs. Denver Broncos ====
Week Two: Denver Broncos at Atlanta Falcons – Game summary

Quarter	1	2	3	4	Total
Broncos	0	7	0	14	21
Falcons	10	10	7	0	27

at Georgia Dome, Atlanta, Georgia

- Date: September 17
- Game time: 8:30 p.m. EDT
- Game weather: Played indoors (dome stadium)
- Game attendance: 70,427
- Referee: Ken Roan
- TV announcers (ESPN): Mike Tirico, Jon Gruden and Lisa Salters
- Gamebook

Game information

First quarter

- ATL – Michael Turner 1-yard run (Matt Bryant kick), 13:20. Falcons 7–0. Drive: 3 plays, 1 yard, 0:53.
- ATL – Matt Bryant 37-yard field goal, 9:46. Falcons 10–0. Drive: 6 plays, 24 yards, 2:04.

Second quarter

- ATL – Matt Bryant 42-yard field goal, 10:05. Falcons 13–0. Drive: 11 plays, 59 yards, 4:57.
- ATL – Tony Gonzalez 1-yard pass from Matt Ryan (Matt Bryant kick), 4:39. Falcons 20–0. Drive: 7 plays, 73 yards, 4:04.
- DEN – Demaryius Thomas 17-yard pass from Peyton Manning (Matt Prater kick), 0:06. Falcons 20–7. Drive: 13 plays, 80 yards, 4:33.

Third quarter

- ATL – Roddy White 4-yard pass from Matt Ryan (Matt Bryant kick), 7:08. Falcons 27–7. Drive: 6 plays, 64 yards, 3:17.

Fourth quarter

- DEN – Willis McGahee 2-yard run (Matt Prater kick), 11:48. Falcons 27–14. Drive: 12 plays, 88 yards, 5:02.
- DEN – Willis McGahee 2-yard run (Matt Prater kick), 3:25. Falcons 27–21. Drive: 9 plays, 45 yards, 2:48.

Top passers

- DEN – Peyton Manning – 24/37, 241 yards, TD, 3 INT
- ATL – Matt Ryan – 24/36, 219 yards, 2 TD

Top rushers

- DEN – Willis McGahee – 22 rushes, 113 yards, 2 TD
- ATL – Michael Turner – 17 rushes, 42 yards, TD

Top receivers

- DEN – Demaryius Thomas – 8 receptions, 78 yards, TD
- ATL – Roddy White – 8 receptions, 102 yards, TD

After winning over the Chiefs on the road, the Falcons returned home to face a newly formed Peyton Manning-led Broncos team. The Falcons got off to a really fast start scoring 20 unanswered points in the first half thanks to four Broncos turnovers. Three plays into the game, Peyton Manning on 3rd-and-12 from his own 12, was intercepted by William Moore at the 34. He returned it 33 yards to the 1 yard line. Three plays later, Michael Turner's 1-yard touchdown run gave the Falcons a 7–0 lead Another interception by Manning led to Matt Bryant's 37-yard field goal to take a 10–0 lead. In the 2nd quarter, the team moved up 13–0 after a Willis McGahee fumble which led to Bryant's 42-yard field goal then Ryan's 1-yard touchdown pass to Tony Gonzalez for a 20–0 lead. The Broncos scored before halftime with Peyton Manning's 17-yard touchdown pass to Demaryius Thomas to cut the lead to 20–7 at halftime. In the third quarter, the Falcons moved ahead by 20 again with Matt Ryan's 4-yard touchdown pass Roddy White for a 27–7 lead. The Broncos then tried to rally a comeback in the 4th quarter with Willis McGahee running for 2-yard touchdowns to cut the lead to 27–21, but the Falcons were able to hold the Broncos off and win the game.

With the win, the Falcons improved to 2–0.

==== Week 3: at San Diego Chargers ====
Week Three: Atlanta Falcons at San Diego Chargers – Game summary

Quarter	1	2	3	4	Total
Falcons	6	14	0	7	27
Chargers	0	0	3	0	3

at Qualcomm Stadium, San Diego, California

- Date: September 23
- Game time: 4:05 p.m. EDT/1:05 p.m. PDT
- Game weather: 82 °F (28 °C), sunny
- Game attendance: 61,297
- Referee: Jim Core
- TV announcers (Fox): Chris Myers, Tim Ryan and Jaime Maggio
- Gamebook

Game information

First quarter

- ATL – Jacquizz Rodgers 8-yard pass from Matt Ryan (run failed), 9:43. Falcons 6–0. Drive: 10 plays, 80 yards, 5:17.

Second quarter

- ATL – Tony Gonzalez 7-yard pass from Matt Ryan (Matt Bryant kick), 2:32. Falcons 13–0. Drive: 17 plays, 96 yards, 7:59.
- ATL – Julio Jones 9-yard pass from Matt Ryan (Matt Bryant kick), 0:54. Falcons 20–0. Drive: 4 plays, 29 yards, 0:59.

Third quarter

- SD – Nate Kaeding 41-yard field goal, 11:10. Falcons 20–3. Drive: 13 plays, 41 yards, 3:50.

Fourth quarter

- ATL – Michael Turner 7-yard run (Matt Bryant kick), 8:51. Falcons 27–3. Drive: 3 plays, 32 yards, 1:35.

Top passers

- ATL – Matt Ryan – 30/40, 275 yards, 3 TD, INT
- SD – Philip Rivers – 21/38, 173 yards, 2 INT

Top rushers

- ATL – Michael Turner – 14 rushes, 80 yards, TD
- SD – Jackie Battle – 3 rushes, 55 yards

Top receivers

- ATL – Tony Gonzalez – 9 receptions, 91 yards, TD
- SD – Malcom Floyd – 3 receptions, 52 yards

The Falcons traveled to take on their 3rd-straight AFC Opponent, the Chargers at Qualcomm Stadium. Again, the Falcons get off to a great start scoring 20 unanswered points for the 2nd straight week. The fast scoring started with Matt Ryan's 8-yard touchdown pass to Jacquizz Rodgers (with a failed 2-point conversion) for a 6–0 lead in the first quarter, followed up in the second quarter with a 7-yard pass to Tony Gonzalez for a 13–0 lead and finally a 9-yard pass to Julio Jones for a 20–0 halftime lead. The Chargers got their only points of the game as Nate Kaeding scored a field goal from 41 yards out, but the Falcons scored the final points in the fourth quarter on a Michael Turner 7-yard touchdown run to make the final score 27–3.

With the win, the Falcons improved to 3–0.

==== Week 4: vs. Carolina Panthers ====
Week Four: Carolina Panthers at Atlanta Falcons – Game summary

Quarter	1	2	3	4	Total
Panthers	7	7	7	7	28
Falcons	7	10	7	6	30

at Georgia Dome, Atlanta, Georgia

- Date: September 30
- Game time: 1:00 p.m. EDT
- Game weather: Played indoors (dome stadium)
- Game attendance: 69,594
- Referee: Walt Coleman
- TV announcers (Fox): Dick Stockton, John Lynch and Jennifer Hale
- Gamebook

Game information

First quarter

- CAR – Greg Olsen 17-yard pass from Cam Newton (Justin Medlock kick), 11:45. Panthers 7–0. Drive: 5 plays, 53 yards, 2:29.
- ATL – Roddy White 49-yard pass from Matt Ryan (Matt Bryant kick), 0:26. Tied 7–7. Drive: 3 plays, 77 yards, 1:30.

Second quarter

- ATL – Matt Bryant 41-yard field goal, 13:11. Falcons 10–7. Drive: 6 plays, 7 yards, 2:05.
- CAR – DeAngelo Williams 13-yard run (Justin Medlock kick), 8:44. Panthers 14–10. Drive: 7 plays, 79 yards, 4:27.
- ATL – Roddy White 14-yard pass from Matt Ryan (Matt Bryant kick), 1:49. Falcons 17–14. Drive: 8 plays, 51 yards, 3:40.

Third quarter

- ATL – Michael Turner 60-yard pass from Matt Ryan (Matt Bryant kick), 10:17. Falcons 24–14. Drive: 3 plays, 72 yards, 1:37.
- CAR – Cam Newton 4-yard run (Justin Medlock kick), 3:16. Falcons 24–21. Drive: 12 plays, 77 yards, 7:01.

Fourth quarter

- CAR – Kealoha Pilares 36-yard pass from Cam Newton (Justin Medlock kick), 7:55. Panthers 28–24. Drive: 6 plays, 88 yards, 3:23.
- ATL – Matt Bryant 33-yard field goal, 4:57. Panthers 28–27. Drive: 9 plays, 65 yards, 2:58.
- ATL – Matt Bryant 40-yard field goal, 0:05. Falcons 30–28. Drive: 5 plays, 77 yards, 0:54.

Top passers

- CAR – Cam Newton – 15/24, 215 yards, 2 TD
- ATL – Matt Ryan – 25/40, 369 yards, 3 TD, INT

Top rushers

- CAR – Cam Newton – 9 rushes, 86 yards, TD
- ATL – Michael Turner – 13 rushes, 103 yards

Top receivers

- CAR – Greg Olsen – 6 receptions, 89 yards, TD
- ATL – Roddy White – 8 receptions, 169 yards, 2 TD

The Falcons traveled back home to take on their division rival Panthers whom they have won 4 straight games over. However, for the first time in the 2012 season, the Falcons trailed a game in the first quarter with Cam Newton's 18-yard touchdown pass to Greg Olson for a 7–0 lead. The Falcons however, were able to move down the field and tie the game with Matt Ryan's 49-yard touchdown pass to Roddy White. The Falcons moved into the lead in the second quarter with Matt Bryant's 41-yard field goal. However, the Panthers retook the lead as DeAngelo Williams ran a touchdown from 13 yards out to make the score 14–10. However, the Falcons then moved back into the lead before halftime with Ryan finding White on a 14-yard touchdown pass to make the score 17–14 at halftime. In the third quarter, the Falcons moved ahead by 10 with Ryan finding Michael Turner on a 60-yard touchdown pass for a 24–14 lead. However, The Panthers were not done yet as they scored 14 unanswered points with Cam Newton's 4-yard run for the last score of the 3rd quarter cutting the lead to 3 at, 24–21. Then, in the fourth quarter Newton found Kealoha Pilares on a 38-yard pass to take a 28–24 lead. The Falcons rallied coming within a point as Matt Bryant scored a field goal from 33 yards out cutting the lead to 28–27. With the ball one last time, the Falcons' comeback drive was successful as they moved down the field and Bryant drained the game-winning field goal from 40 yards out to win the game 30–28.

With their 5th straight win over the Panthers, the Falcons improved to 4–0 for only the 3rd time in franchise history.

==== Week 5: at Washington Redskins ====
Week Five: Atlanta Falcons at Washington Redskins – Game summary

Quarter	1	2	3	4	Total
Falcons	0	7	0	17	24
Redskins	0	7	3	7	17

at FedExField, Landover, Maryland

- Date: October 7
- Game time: 1:00 p.m. EDT
- Game weather: 52 °F (11 °C), cloudy
- Game attendance: 75,337
- Referee: Bill Leavy
- TV announcers (Fox): Sam Rosen, John Lynch and Jennifer Hale
- Gamebook

Game information

First quarter

- No scoring plays.

Second quarter

- WAS – Ryan Kerrigan 28-yard interception return (Billy Cundiff kick), 10:11. Redskins 7–0.
- ATL – Tony Gonzalez 1-yard pass from Matt Ryan (Matt Bryant kick), 0:30. Tied 7–7. Drive: 8 plays, 79 yards, 1:46.

Third quarter

- WAS – Billy Cundiff 23-yard field goal, 5:56. Redskins 10–7. Drive: 8 plays, 34 yards, 3:29.

Fourth quarter

- ATL – Julio Jones 18-yard pass from Matt Ryan (Matt Bryant kick), 13:23. Falcons 14–10. Drive: 6 plays, 47 yards, 2:32.
- WAS – Santana Moss 77-yard pass from Kirk Cousins (Billy Cundiff kick), 12:24. Redskins 17–14. Drive: 3 plays, 78 yards, 0:59.
- ATL – Matt Bryant 53-yard field goal, 7:42. Tied 17–17. Drive: 9 plays, 45 yards, 4:42.
- ATL – Michael Turner 13-yard run (Matt Bryant kick), 2:46. Falcons 24–17. Drive: 6 plays, 69 yards, 2:54.

Top passers

- ATL – Matt Ryan – 34/52, 345 yards, 2 TD, INT
- WAS – Kirk Cousins – 5/9, 111 yards, TD, 2 INT

Top rushers

- ATL – Michael Turner – 17 rushes, 64 yards, TD
- WAS – Alfred Morris – 18 rushes, 115 yards

Top receivers

- ATL – Tony Gonzalez – 13 receptions, 123 yards, TD
- WAS – Santana Moss – 2 receptions, 80 yards, TD

After a tough win at home, the Falcons traveled to take on the Redskins. After a scoreless first quarter, the Falcons would trail a game again for the second time all season as the Skins took the lead with Ryan Kerrigan returning an interception 28 yards for a touchdown. The Falcons offense sputtered for the majority of the half, but not long before halftime, Matt Ryan was able to find Tony Gonzalez on a 1-yard pass to tie the game. In the third quarter, the Skins retook the lead with Billy Cundiff scoring a 23-yard field goal to make the score 10–7 for the only score of the period. But then crazy fourth quarter scoring began as the Falcons retook the lead as Matt Ryan found Julio Jones on an 18-yard touchdown pass to make the score 14–10. The Skins however moved back into the lead as their 2nd-string and fellow rookie QB Kirk Cousins found Santana moss on a 77-yard pass. Matt Bryant's 53-yard field goal would tie the game at 17. Michael Turner's 13-yard touchdown run would then secure the 24–17 victory for the Falcons.

With the win, the Falcons started 5–0 for the first time in franchise history.

==== Week 6: vs. Oakland Raiders ====
Week Six: Oakland Raiders at Atlanta Falcons – Game summary

Quarter	1	2	3	4	Total
Raiders	3	10	0	7	20
Falcons	0	7	6	10	23

at Georgia Dome, Atlanta, Georgia

- Date: October 14
- Game time: 1:00 p.m. EDT
- Game weather: Played indoors (dome stadium)
- Game attendance: 69,383
- Referee: Terry McAulay
- TV announcers (CBS): Greg Gumbel and Dan Dierdorf
- Gamebook

Game information

First quarter

- OAK – Sebastian Janikowski 52-yard field goal, 0:24. Raiders 3–0. Drive: 8 plays, 65 yards, 4:24.

Second quarter

- ATL – Roddy White 4-yard pass from Matt Ryan (Matt Bryant kick), 9:51. Falcons 7–3. Drive: 10 plays, 80 yards, 5:33.
- OAK – Sebastian Janikowski 22-yard field goal, 4:11. Falcons 7–6. Drive: 10 plays, 76 yards, 5:40.
- OAK – Denarius Moore 25-yard pass from Carson Palmer (Sebastian Janikowski kick), 1:50. Raiders 13–7. Drive: 2 plays, 28 yards, 0:54.

Third quarter

- ATL – Matt Bryant 41-yard field goal, 5:06. Raiders 13–10. Drive: 9 plays, 47 yards, 3:29.
- ATL – Matt Bryant 20-yard field goal, 2:31. Tied 13–13. Drive: 4 plays, 0 yards, 1:53.

Fourth quarter

- ATL – Asante Samuel 79-yard interception return (Matt Bryant kick), 2:40. Falcons 20–13.
- OAK – Darren McFadden 2-yard run (Sebastian Janikowski kick), 0:40. Tied 20–20. Drive: 8 plays, 80 yards, 2:00.
- ATL – Matt Bryant 55-yard field goal, 0:01. Falcons 23–20. Drive: 7 plays, 43 yards, 0:39.

Top passers

- OAK – Carson Palmer – 23/33, 353 yards, TD, INT
- ATL – Matt Ryan – 24/37, 249 yards, TD, 3 INT

Top rushers

- OAK – Darren McFadden – 27 rushes, 70 yards, TD
- ATL – Michael Turner – 11 rushes, 33 yards

Top receivers

- OAK – Denarius Moore – 5 receptions, 104 yards, TD
- ATL – Roddy White – 6 receptions, 72 yards, TD

The Falcons returned home to take on the last of their AFC Opponents. Coming back home they are 3–0 against the AFC West. However, for the 3rd straight week, the team would trail a game as the Raiders moved ahead after Sebastian Janikowski's 53-yard field goal for the only score of the first quarter. The Falcons however took the lead with Matt Ryan finding Roddy White on a 4-yard pass to move up 7–3. However, the Raiders would come within a point with Janikowski kicking a 22-yard field goal and then retook the lead with Carson Palmer's 25-yard touchdown pass to Denarius Moore for a 13–7 halftime lead. After the break, the Falcons were able to score 13 unanswered points. First, Bryant kicked 2 field goals from 41 and 20 yards tie the game at 13–13. Then, In the fourth quarter, they took the lead after Asante Samuel returned an interception from 79 yards out for a touchdown to make the score 20–13. The Raiders however were able to make up for this mistake as Carson Palmer drove them down the field and Darren McFadden ran a touchdown in from 2 yards out to tie the game at 20–20. However, again the Falcons were able to complete the comeback as Bryant nailed a 55-yard field goal with 0:01 left to make the final score 23–20

With the win, the Falcons go into their bye week with their first ever 6–0 start to a season. They also finish the season 4–0 against the AFC West and with the Texans' loss to the Packers on Sunday Night, they remain the NFL's only undefeated team.

==== Week 8: at Philadelphia Eagles ====
Week Eight: Atlanta Falcons at Philadelphia Eagles – Game summary

Quarter	1	2	3	4	Total
Falcons	14	10	3	3	30
Eagles	0	7	3	7	17

at Lincoln Financial Field, Philadelphia, Pennsylvania

- Date: October 28
- Game time: 1:00 p.m. EDT
- Game weather: 58 °F (14 °C), mostly cloudy
- Game attendance: 69,144
- Referee: Gene Steratore
- TV announcers (Fox): Dick Stockton, John Lynch and Jennifer Hale
- Gamebook

Game information

First quarter

- ATL – Drew Davis 15-yard pass from Matt Ryan (Matt Bryant kick), 6:16. Falcons 7–0. Drive: 16 plays, 80 yards, 8:44.
- ATL – Jason Snelling 3-yard pass from Matt Ryan (Matt Bryant kick), 0:32. Falcons 14–0. Drive: 8 plays, 51 yards, 4:18.

Second quarter

- PHI – LeSean McCoy 2-yard run (Alex Henery kick), 8:18. Falcons 14–7. Drive: 13 plays, 66 yards, 7:14.
- ATL – Julio Jones 63-yard pass from Matt Ryan (Matt Bryant kick), 6:33. Falcons 21–7. Drive: 3 plays, 73 yards, 1:45.
- ATL – Matt Bryant 43-yard field goal, 0:02. Falcons 24–7. Drive: 13 plays, 66 yards, 2:46.

Third quarter

- PHI – Alex Henery 33-yard field goal, 11:20. Falcons 24–10. Drive: 9 plays, 68 yards, 3:40.
- ATL – Matt Bryant 29-yard field goal, 6:10. Falcons 27–10. Drive: 12 plays, 69 yards, 5:10.

Fourth quarter

- ATL – Matt Bryant 30-yard field goal, 14:57. Falcons 30–10. Drive: 9 plays, 78 yards, 5:05.
- PHI – LeSean McCoy 7-yard pass from Michael Vick (Alex Henery kick), 7:18. Falcons 30–17. Drive: 16 plays, 80 yards, 7:39.

Top passers

- ATL – Matt Ryan – 22/29, 262 yards, 3 TD
- PHI – Michael Vick – 21/35, 191 yards, TD

Top rushers

- ATL – Jacquizz Rodgers – 8 rushes, 60 yards
- PHI – LeSean McCoy – 16 rushes, 45 yards, TD

Top receivers

- ATL – Julio Jones – 5 receptions, 123 yards, TD
- PHI – Jeremy Maclin – 5 receptions, 59 yards

The Falcons traveled to the wake of Philadelphia to take on the Eagles. The game, played under cloudy skies, was also notable in that the weather conditions heralded the approach of Hurricane Sandy, a storm which was set to make landfall in nearby South Jersey.

In the first quarter, the Falcons drew first blood as Matt Ryan found Drew Davis for a 15-yard pass to make the score 7–0. The team increased their lead with Ryan finding Jason Snelling to make it 14–0. In the 2nd quarter, the Eagles would get on the board with LeSean McCoy's 2-Yard run. However, the Falcons responded with Ryan's 63-yard TD pass to Julio Jones and with Matt Bryant's 43-yard field goal to make it 24–7. The Eagles would try to rally in the 3rd quarter with a 33-yard field goal from Alex Henry to shorten the lead to 24–10, but the Falcons pulled away as Bryant would kick a 29-yard field and later in the 4th quarter, Bryant increased the Falcons' lead with a 30-yard field goal to make the score 30–10. The Eagles tried to rally as Michael Vick found McCoy to make the score 30–17, but couldn't do anything when they got the ball back, making the final score, 30–17.

With the win, the Falcons improved to 7–0 for the first time in franchise history. The team also moves to 2–0 against the NFC East.

==== Week 9: vs. Dallas Cowboys ====
Week Nine: Dallas Cowboys at Atlanta Falcons – Game summary

Quarter	1	2	3	4	Total
Cowboys	6	0	0	7	13
Falcons	0	6	0	13	19

at Georgia Dome, Atlanta, Georgia

- Date: November 4
- Game time: 8:20 p.m. EST
- Game weather: Played indoors (dome stadium)
- Game attendance: 70,840
- Referee: John Parry
- TV announcers (NBC): Al Michaels, Cris Collinsworth and Michele Tafoya
- Gamebook

Game information

First quarter

- DAL – Dan Bailey 23-yard field goal, 10:46. Cowboys 3–0. Drive: 7 plays, 27 yards, 3:07.
- DAL – Dan Bailey 32-yard field goal, 3:42. Cowboys 6–0. Drive: 7 plays, 59 yards, 2:33.

Second quarter

- ATL – Matt Bryant 45-yard field goal, 14:15. Cowboys 6–3. Drive: 8 plays, 46 yards, 4:27.
- ATL – Matt Bryant 46-yard field goal, 0:00. Tied 6–6. Drive: 7 plays, 60 yards, 1:03.

Third quarter

- No scoring plays.

Fourth quarter

- ATL – Michael Turner 3-yard run (Matt Bryant kick), 14:16. Falcons 13–6. Drive: 6 plays, 81 yards, 3:23.
- ATL – Matt Bryant 36-yard field goal, 7:49. Falcons 16–6. Drive: 9 plays, 62 yards, 4:50.
- DAL – Kevin Ogletree 21-yard pass from Tony Romo (Dan Bailey kick), 5:21. Falcons 16–13. Drive: 6 plays, 78 yards, 2:28.
- ATL – Matt Bryant 32-yard field goal, 0:17. Falcons 19–13. Drive: 12 plays, 66 yards, 5:04.

Top passers

- DAL – Tony Romo – 25/35, 321 yards, TD
- ATL – Matt Ryan – 24/34, 342 yards

Top rushers

- DAL – Felix Jones – 9 rushes, 39 yards
- ATL – Michael Turner – 20 rushes, 102 yards, TD

Top receivers

- DAL – Kevin Ogletree – 3 receptions, 96 yards, TD
- ATL – Julio Jones – 5 receptions, 129 yards

The Falcons returned home to take on the Cowboys. The Cowboys drew first blood with their 23-yard field goal from Dan Bailey to take a 3–0 lead. With this field goal, the Falcons' trend then simmered to 4 out of their last 5 games trailing a team. The Cowboys then put up another Bailey field goal from 32 yards out to make the lead 6–0. The Falcons responded in the second quarter with field goals from Matt Bryant from 45 and 46 yards out to tie the game at halftime at 6–6. After a scoreless third quarter, the Falcons took the lead in the fourth quarter with Michael Turner running for a 3-yard touchdown. Then they increased their lead with Bryant's 36-yard field goal for a 16–6 lead. The Boys tried to rally as Tony Romo found Kevin Ogletree on a 21-yard touchdown pass to cut the lead to 16–13, but the Falcons increased their lead with Bryant's 32-yard field goal, making the Cowboys have to score a touchdown. They couldn't and the Falcons won 19–13.

With the win, the Falcons improved to 8–0 for the first time in franchise history. Also they went 3–0 against the NFC East.

==== Week 10: at New Orleans Saints ====
Week Ten: Atlanta Falcons at New Orleans Saints – Game summary

Quarter	1	2	3	4	Total
Falcons	10	7	0	10	27
Saints	7	14	7	3	31

at Mercedes-Benz Superdome, New Orleans, Louisiana

- Date: November 11
- Game time: 1:00 p.m. EST
- Game weather: Played indoors (dome stadium)
- Game attendance: 73,126
- Referee: Tony Corrente
- TV announcers (Fox): Kenny Albert, Daryl Johnston and Tony Siragusa
- Gamebook

Game information

First quarter

- ATL – Mike Johnson 1-yard pass from Matt Ryan (Matt Bryant kick), 11:38. Falcons 7–0. Drive: 7 plays, 80 yards, 3:22.
- ATL – Matt Bryant 37-yard field goal, 9:19. Falcons 10–0. Drive: 4 plays, 8 yards, 2:07.
- NO – Chris Ivory 56-yard run (Garrett Hartley kick), 6:49. Falcons 10–7. Drive: 6 plays, 78 yards, 2:30.

Second quarter

- NO – Jimmy Graham 29-yard pass from Drew Brees (Garrett Hartley kick), 13:33. Saints 14–10. Drive: 11 plays, 90 yards, 5:23.
- ATL – Tony Gonzalez 2-yard pass from Matt Ryan (Matt Bryant kick), 6:27. Falcons 17–14. Drive: 14 plays, 80 yards, 7:06.
- NO – Jimmy Graham 14-yard pass from Drew Brees (Garrett Hartley kick), 0:34. Saints 21–17. Drive: 8 plays, 69 yards, 1:43.

Third quarter

- NO – Marques Colston 7-yard pass from Drew Brees (Garrett Hartley kick), 9:23. Saints 28–17. Drive: 7 plays, 81 yards, 3:31.

Fourth quarter

- ATL – Tony Gonzalez 6-yard pass from Matt Ryan (Matt Bryant kick), 13:27. Saints 28–24. Drive: 11 plays, 91 yards, 5:46.
- ATL – Matt Bryant 20-yard field goal, 9:08. Saints 28–27. Drive: 6 plays, 67 yards, 2:42.
- NO – Garrett Hartley 31-yard field goal, 5:54. Saints 31–27. Drive: 9 plays, 67 yards, 3:14.

Top passers

- ATL – Matt Ryan – 34/52, 411 yards, 3 TD, INT
- NO – Drew Brees – 21/32, 298 yards, 3 TD, INT

Top rushers

- ATL – Jacquizz Rodgers – 3 rushes, 29 yards
- NO – Chris Ivory – 7 rushes, 72 yards, TD

Top receivers

- ATL – Tony Gonzalez – 11 receptions, 122 yards, 2 TD
- NO – Jimmy Graham – 7 receptions, 146 yards, 2 TD

The Falcons traveled to New Orleans to take on their longtime rival Saints. They drew first blood as Mike Johnson got a 1-yard touchdown pass from Matt Ryan to take a 7–0 lead. They then increased their lead to make the score 10–0 off of a Matt Bryant field goal from 37 yards out. The Saints got on the board as Chris Ivory ran for a 56-yard touchdown to make the score 10–7. In the 2nd quarter, the Saints took the lead as Drew Brees found Jimmy Graham for a 29-yard pass to make the score 14–10. Then the Falcons retook the lead as Tony Gonzalez caught a 6-yard pass from Matt Ryan to move ahead 17–14. The Saints moved back into the lead as Brees found Graham again on a 14-yard pass for a 21–17 halftime lead. After the break, the Saints went back to work as Brees found Marques Colston on a 7-yard pass to move ahead 28–17. The Falcons drew within 4 points with Gonzalez's 6-yard pass from Ryan to make the score 28–24 for the only score of the 3rd quarter and then Bryant kicked another field goal to make the score 20-yard field goal for a 28–27. However, the offense was then overpowered as the Saints scored their only points of the half off of Garrett Hartley's 31-yard field goal to make the final score 31–27.

With the loss, the Falcons dropped to 8–1.

Tony Gonzalez became the first tight end in NFL history to have 100 receiving touchdowns.

==== Week 11: vs. Arizona Cardinals ====
Week Eleven: Arizona Cardinals at Atlanta Falcons – Game summary

Quarter	1	2	3	4	Total
Cardinals	13	3	0	3	19
Falcons	0	16	0	7	23

at Georgia Dome, Atlanta, Georgia

- Date: November 18
- Game time: 1:00 p.m. EST
- Game weather: Played indoors (dome stadium)
- Game attendance: 69,630
- Referee: Bill Vinovich
- TV announcers (Fox): Kenny Albert, Daryl Johnston and Tony Siragusa
- Gamebook

Game information

First quarter

- ARI – LaRod Stephens-Howling 3-yard run (Jay Feely kick), 13:54. Cardinals 7–0. Drive: 2 plays, 9 yards, 0:47.
- ARI – Jay Feely 48-yard field goal, 10:59. Cardinals 10–0. Drive: 5 plays, 40 yards, 2:00.
- ARI – Jay Feely 28-yard field goal, 1:02. Cardinals 13–0. Drive: 4 plays, 9 yards, 1:38.

Second quarter

- ATL – Matt Bryant 51-yard field goal, 9:39. Cardinals 13–3. Drive: 13 plays, 47 yards, 6:23.
- ATL – Jonathan Babineaux 15-yard fumble return (Matt Bryant kick), 8:37. Cardinals 13–10.
- ATL – Matt Bryant 28-yard field goal, 1:52. Tied 13–13. Drive: 10 plays, 81 yards, 4:56.
- ARI – Jay Feely 38-yard field goal, 0:32. Cardinals 16–13. Drive: 6 plays, 74 yards, 1:20.
- ATL – Matt Bryant 48-yard field goal, 0:00. Tied 16–16. Drive: 5 plays, 50 yards, 0:32.

Third quarter

- No scoring plays.

Fourth quarter

- ARI – Jay Feely 27-yard field goal, 14:56. Cardinals 19–16. Drive: 4 plays, 7 yards, 1:47.
- ATL – Michael Turner 1-yard run (Matt Bryant kick), 6:40. Falcons 23–19. Drive: 7 plays, 70 yards, 3:04.

Top passers

- ARI – Ryan Lindley – 9/20, 64 yards
- ATL – Matt Ryan – 28/46, 301 yards, 5 INT

Top rushers

- ARI – LaRod Stephens-Howling – 22 rushes, 127 yards, TD
- ATL – Michael Turner – 15 rushes, 46 yards, TD

Top receivers

- ARI – Early Doucet – 5 receptions, 28 yards
- ATL – Roddy White – 6 receptions, 123 yards

With the close win, the Falcons improved to 9–1 giving them their 5th straight winning season. The Falcons are the most recent team to win a regular season game with a -5 turnover differential (the 2022 Jaguars defeated the 2022 Chargers in the Wild Card Round of the playoffs in this scenario). This was the last time a team won with their quarterback throwing 5 interceptions until the 2024 Lions defeated the 2024 Texans in that scenario.

==== Week 12: at Tampa Bay Buccaneers ====
Week Twelve: Atlanta Falcons at Tampa Bay Buccaneers – Game summary

Quarter	1	2	3	4	Total
Falcons	3	7	7	7	24
Buccaneers	7	3	3	10	23

at Raymond James Stadium, Tampa, Florida

- Date: November 25
- Game time: 1:00 p.m. EST
- Game weather: 65 °F (18 °C), sunny
- Game attendance: 54,400
- Referee: Jeff Triplette
- TV announcers (Fox): Thom Brennaman, Charles Davis and Laura Okmin
- Gamebook

Game information

First quarter

- ATL – Matt Bryant 31-yard field goal, 7:38. Falcons 3–0. Drive: 12 plays, 67 yards, 7:22.
- TB – Doug Martin 1-yard run (Connor Barth kick), 1:12. Buccaneers 7–3. Drive: 10 plays, 81 yards, 6:26.

Second quarter

- ATL – Jacquizz Rodgers 5-yard run (Matt Bryant kick), 10:25. Falcons 10–7. Drive: 10 plays, 75 yards, 5:47.
- TB – Connor Barth 22-yard field goal, 3:37. Tied 10–10. Drive: 5 plays, 27 yards, 2:10.

Third quarter

- TB – Connor Barth 42-yard field goal, 8:37. Buccaneers 13–10. Drive: 13 plays, 62 yards, 6:23.
- ATL – Julio Jones 80-yard pass from Matt Ryan (Matt Bryant kick), 8:26. Falcons 17–13. Drive: 1 play, 80 yards, 0:11.

Fourth quarter

- TB – Doug Martin 1-yard run (Connor Barth kick), 14:56. Buccaneers 20–17. Drive: 9 plays, 82 yards, 5:16.
- TB – Connor Barth 48-yard field goal, 10:28. Buccaneers 23–17. Drive: 4 plays, 6 yards, 0:55.
- ATL – Michael Turner 3-yard run (Matt Bryant kick), 7:55. Falcons 24–23. Drive: 6 plays, 64 yards, 2:33.

Top passers

- ATL – Matt Ryan – 26/32, 353 yards, TD
- TB – Josh Freeman – 19/30, 256 yards

Top rushers

- ATL – Jacquizz Rodgers – 10 rushes, 49 yards, TD
- TB – Doug Martin – 21 rushes, 50 yards, 2 TD

Top receivers

- ATL – Julio Jones – 6 receptions, 147 yards, TD
- TB – Vincent Jackson – 5 receptions, 96 yards

With the win, the Falcons improved to 10–1.

==== Week 13: vs. New Orleans Saints ====
Week Thirteen: New Orleans Saints at Atlanta Falcons – Game summary

Quarter	1	2	3	4	Total
Saints	0	7	6	0	13
Falcons	7	10	0	6	23

at Georgia Dome, Atlanta, Georgia

- Date: November 29
- Game time: 8:20 p.m. EST
- Game weather: Played indoors (dome stadium)
- Game attendance: 70,514
- Referee: Scott Green
- TV announcers (NFLN): Brad Nessler, Mike Mayock and Alex Flanagan
- Gamebook

Game information

First quarter

- ATL – Michael Turner 3-yard run (Matt Bryant kick), 11:09. Falcons 7–0. Drive: 6 plays, 80 yards, 3:51.

Second quarter

- ATL – Tony Gonzalez 17-yard pass from Matt Ryan (Matt Bryant kick), 14:08. Falcons 14–0. Drive: 5 plays, 49 yards, 2:28.
- ATL – Matt Bryant 45-yard field goal, 8:53. Falcons 17–0. Drive: 4 plays, 2 yards, 0:51.
- NO – Mark Ingram 1-yard run (Garrett Hartley kick), 3:17. Falcons 17–7. Drive: 11 plays, 80 yards, 5:36.

Third quarter

- NO – Garrett Hartley 21-yard field goal, 8:24. Falcons 17–10. Drive: 15 plays, 83 yards, 6:36.
- NO – Garrett Hartley 52-yard field goal, 3:53. Falcons 17–13. Drive: 8 plays, 36 yards, 2:49.

Fourth quarter

- ATL – Matt Bryant 29-yard field goal, 14:48. Falcons 20–13. Drive: 7 plays, 30 yards, 2:50.
- ATL – Matt Bryant 55-yard field goal, 4:25. Falcons 23–13. Drive: 11 plays, 43 yards, 5:38.

Top passers

- NO – Drew Brees – 28/50, 341 yards, 5 INT
- ATL – Matt Ryan – 18/33, 165 yards, TD

Top rushers

- NO – Pierre Thomas – 14 rushes, 84 yards
- ATL – Michael Turner – 12 rushes, 83 yards, TD

Top receivers

- NO – Lance Moore – 7 receptions, 123 yards
- ATL – Tony Gonzalez – 4 receptions, 58 yards, TD

With the win, the Falcons not only improved to 11–1, but also clinched the division title of the NFC South, following the Bucs' loss to the Broncos that week. Additionally, the Falcons broke Drew Brees' 54-game touchdown streak.

==== Week 14: at Carolina Panthers ====
Week Fourteen: Atlanta Falcons at Carolina Panthers – Game summary

Quarter	1	2	3	4	Total
Falcons	0	0	7	13	20
Panthers	7	9	7	7	30

at Bank of America Stadium, Charlotte, North Carolina

- Date: December 9
- Game time: 1:00 p.m. EST
- Game weather: 70 °F (21 °C), cloudy
- Game attendance: 73,292
- Referee: Ed Hochuli
- TV announcers (Fox): Gus Johnson, Charles Davis and Kristina Pink
- Gamebook

Game information

First quarter

- CAR – Greg Olsen 25-yard pass from Cam Newton (Graham Gano kick), 7:49. Panthers 7–0. Drive: 11 plays, 77 yards, 7:11.

Second quarter

- CAR – Graham Gano 24-yard field goal, 10:55. Panthers 10–0. Drive: 17 plays, 72 yards, 9:17.
- CAR – Graham Gano 41-yard field goal, 4:58. Panthers 13–0. Drive: 7 plays, 52 yards, 3:45.
- CAR – Graham Gano 31-yard field goal, 0:00. Panthers 16–0. Drive: 13 plays, 59 yards, 3:35.

Third quarter

- CAR – Cam Newton 72-yard run (Graham Gano kick), 11:01. Panthers 23–0. Drive: 4 plays, 86 yards, 2:08.
- ATL – Roddy White 4-yard pass from Matt Ryan (Matt Bryant kick), 4:48. Panthers 23–7. Drive: 13 plays, 84 yards, 6:13.

Fourth quarter

- ATL – Julio Jones 11-yard pass from Matt Ryan (pass failed), 13:57. Panthers 23–13. Drive: 11 plays, 80 yards, 3:41.
- CAR – DeAngelo Williams 53-yard pass from Cam Newton (Graham Gano kick), 4:11. Panthers 30–13. Drive: 4 plays, 60 yards, 2:08.
- ATL – Michael Turner 1-yard run (Matt Bryant kick), 0:53. Panthers 30–20. Drive: 13 plays, 80 yards, 3:18.

Top passers

- ATL – Matt Ryan – 34/49, 342 yards, 2 TD, INT
- CAR – Cam Newton – 23/35, 287 yards, 2 TD

Top rushers

- ATL – Jacquizz Rodgers – 6 rushes, 43 yards
- CAR – Cam Newton – 9 rushes, 116 yards, TD

Top receivers

- ATL – Roddy White – 9 receptions, 117 yards, TD
- CAR – Steve Smith Sr. – 7 receptions, 109 yards

==== Week 15: vs. New York Giants ====
Week Fifteen: New York Giants at Atlanta Falcons – Game summary

Quarter	1	2	3	4	Total
Giants	0	0	0	0	0
Falcons	14	3	10	7	34

at Georgia Dome, Atlanta, Georgia

- Date: December 16
- Game time: 1:00 p.m. EST
- Game weather: Played indoors (dome stadium)
- Game attendance: 70,741
- Referee: Bill Leavy
- TV announcers (Fox): Kenny Albert, Daryl Johnston and Tony Siragusa
- Gamebook

Game information

First quarter

- ATL – Michael Turner 1-yard run (Matt Bryant kick), 12:12. Falcons 7–0. Drive: 4 plays, 16 yards, 1:51.
- ATL – Tony Gonzalez 12-yard pass from Matt Ryan (Matt Bryant kick), 1:43. Falcons 14–0. Drive: 10 plays, 80 yards, 5:42.

Second quarter

- ATL – Matt Bryant 38-yard field goal, 10:22. Falcons 17–0. Drive: 4 plays, 8 yards, 1:46.

Third quarter

- ATL – Julio Jones 40-yard pass from Matt Ryan (Matt Bryant kick), 11:31. Falcons 24–0. Drive: 8 plays, 80 yards, 3:29.
- ATL – Matt Bryant 19-yard field goal, 0:10. Falcons 27–0. Drive: 12 plays, 73 yards, 6:46.

Fourth quarter

- ATL – Julio Jones 3-yard pass from Matt Ryan (Matt Bryant kick), 4:57. Falcons 34–0. Drive: 13 plays, 69 yards, 9:14.

Top passers

- NYG – Eli Manning – 13/25, 161 yards, 2 INT
- ATL – Matt Ryan – 23/28, 270 yards, 3 TD

Top rushers

- NYG – David Wilson – 12 rushes, 55 yards
- ATL – Michael Turner – 16 rushes, 52 yards, TD

Top receivers

- NYG – Domenik Hixon – 5 receptions, 80 yards
- ATL – Harry Douglas – 3 receptions, 83 yards

The 34–0 win over the Giants was the worst shutout loss to a defending Super Bowl champion team in NFL history. The next three worst were 27–0, 17–0, and 16–0, all by the Oakland Raiders in the same season.

==== Week 16: at Detroit Lions ====
Week Sixteen: Atlanta Falcons at Detroit Lions – Game summary

Quarter	1	2	3	4	Total
Falcons	7	14	0	10	31
Lions	3	3	7	5	18

at Ford Field, Detroit, Michigan

- Date: December 22
- Game time: 8:30 p.m. EST
- Game weather: Played indoors (dome stadium)
- Game attendance: 63,849
- Referee: Gene Steratore
- TV announcers (ESPN): Mike Tirico, Jon Gruden and Lisa Salters
- Gamebook

Game information

First quarter

- ATL – Roddy White 44-yard pass from Matt Ryan (Matt Bryant kick), 5:50. Falcons 7–0. Drive: 4 plays, 69 yards, 2:22.
- DET – Jason Hanson 34-yard field goal, 0:13. Falcons 7–3. Drive: 11 plays, 58 yards, 5:37.

Second quarter

- ATL – Roddy White 39-yard pass from Matt Ryan (Matt Bryant kick), 9:54. Falcons 14–3. Drive: 9 plays, 80 yards, 5:19.
- ATL – Julio Jones 16-yard pass from Matt Ryan. (Matt Bryant kick), 1:17. Falcons 21–3. Drive: 7 plays, 40 yards, 2:47.
- DET – Jason Hanson 38-yard field goal, 0:02. Falcons 21–6. Drive: 7 plays, 65 yards, 1:15.

Third quarter

- DET – Mikel Leshoure 1-yard run (Jason Hanson kick), 6:59. Falcons 21–13. Drive: 10 plays, 60 yards, 6:36.

Fourth quarter

- DET – Jason Hanson 20-yard field goal, 13:26. Falcons 21–16. Drive: 12 plays, 83 yards, 6:55.
- ATL – Michael Palmer 1-yard pass from Matt Ryan (Matt Bryant kick), 7:12. Falcons 28–16. Drive: 11 plays, 78 yards, 6:14.
- ATL – Matt Bryant 20-yard field goal, 3:05. Falcons 31–16. Drive: 8 plays, 40 yards, 3:58.
- DET – Michael Turner tackled by Kyle Vanden Bosch in end zone for a safety, 1:21. Falcons 31–18.

Top passers

- ATL – Matt Ryan – 25/32, 279 yards, 4 TD
- DET – Matthew Stafford – 37/56, 443 yards, INT

Top rushers

- ATL – Michael Turner – 13 rushes, 41 yards
- DET – Mikel Leshoure – 15 rushes, 46 yards, TD

Top receivers

- ATL – Roddy White – 8 receptions, 153 yards, 2 TD
- DET – Calvin Johnson – 11 receptions, 225 yards

With their victory in the Motor City on Saturday night, the Falcons improved to 13–2 and clinched the No. 1 playoff seed in the NFC (and as a result home-field advantage) for the first time since 2010.

Lions WR Calvin Johnson broke Jerry Rice's record for Most Receiving Yards in a Season. Rice had 1,848 in his 1995 season and Johnson now had 1,892 with one game left to play.

==== Week 17: vs. Tampa Bay Buccaneers ====
Week Seventeen: Tampa Bay Buccaneers at Atlanta Falcons – Game summary

Quarter	1	2	3	4	Total
Buccaneers	3	10	9	0	22
Falcons	3	0	7	7	17

at Georgia Dome, Atlanta, Georgia

- Date: December 30
- Game time: 1:00 p.m. EST
- Game weather: Played indoors (dome stadium)
- Game attendance: 69,644
- Referee: Carl Cheffers
- TV announcers (Fox): Dick Stockton, John Lynch and Jennifer Hale

Game information

First quarter

- TB – Connor Barth 48-yard field goal, 6:24. Buccaneers 3–0. Drive: 9 plays, 60 yards, 4:25.
- ATL – Matt Bryant 28-yard field goal, 2:24. Tied 3–3. Drive: 9 plays, 62 yards, 4:00.

Second quarter

- TB – Mike Williams 8-yard pass from Josh Freeman (Connor Barth kick), 8:43. Buccaneers 10–3. Drive: 7 plays, 64 yards, 3:55.
- TB – Connor Barth 22-yard field goal, 3:03. Buccaneers 13–3. Drive: 7 plays, 22 yards, 3:03.

Third quarter

- TB – Connor Barth 42-yard field goal, 10:47. Buccaneers 16–3. Drive: 11 plays, 56 yards, 4:13.
- ATL – Michael Turner 17-yard run (Matt Bryant kick), 3:45. Buccaneers 16–10. Drive: 2 plays, 21 yards, 0:41.
- TB – Doug Martin 40-yard run (pass failed), 1:43. Buccaneers 22–10. Drive: 4 plays, 80 yards, 2:02.

Fourth quarter

- ATL – Harry Douglas 7-yard pass from Matt Ryan (Matt Bryant kick), 7:02. Buccaneers 22–17. Drive: 9 plays, 52 yards, 4:21.

Top passers

- TB – Josh Freeman – 19/35, 222 yards, TD, INT
- ATL – Matt Ryan – 28/44, 238 yards, TD

Top rushers

- TB – Doug Martin – 28 rushes, 142 yards, TD
- ATL – Jacquizz Rodgers – 5 rushes, 28 yards

Top receivers

- TB – Mike Williams – 6 receptions, 65 yards, TD
- ATL – Julio Jones – 3 receptions, 56 yards

During the game, John Abraham suffered an ankle injury. Also, Asante Samuel appeared to have aggravated a shoulder injury and Dunta Robinson suffered a head injury.

=== Postseason ===
Round	Date	Opponent (seed)	Result	Record	Venue	Recap
Wild Card	First-round bye					
Divisional	January 13, 2013	Seattle Seahawks (5)	W 30–28	1–0	Georgia Dome	Recap
NFC Championship	January 20, 2013	San Francisco 49ers (2)	L 24–28	1–1	Georgia Dome	Recap

==== NFC Divisional Playoffs: vs. #5 Seattle Seahawks ====
NFC Divisional Playoffs: (#5) Seattle Seahawks at (#1) Atlanta Falcons – Game summary

Quarter	1	2	3	4	Total
Seahawks	0	0	7	21	28
Falcons	10	10	7	3	30

at Georgia Dome, Atlanta, Georgia

- Date: January 13, 2013
- Game time: 1:00 p.m. EST
- Game weather: Played indoors (dome stadium)
- Referee: Walt Coleman
- TV announcers (Fox): Thom Brennaman, Brian Billick, Laura Okmin and Chris Myers

Game information

First quarter

- ATL – Matt Bryant 39-yard field goal, 9:40. Falcons 3–0. Drive: 11 plays, 54 yards, 5:20.
- ATL – Tony Gonzalez 1-yard pass from Matt Ryan (Matt Bryant kick), 3:10. Falcons 10–0. Drive: 8 plays, 61 yards, 2:41.

Second quarter

- ATL – Matt Bryant 37-yard field goal, 9:13. Falcons 13–0. Drive: 11 plays, 68 yards, 6:18.
- ATL – Roddy White 47-yard pass from Matt Ryan (Matt Bryant kick), 4:16. Falcons 20–0. Drive: 3 plays, 88 yards, 1:17.

Third quarter

- SEA – Golden Tate 29-yard pass from Russell Wilson (Ryan Longwell kick), 9:47. Falcons 20–7. Drive: 9 plays, 80 yards, 5:13.
- ATL – Jason Snelling 5-yard pass from Russell Wilson (Ryan Longwell kick), 2:11. Falcons 27–7. Drive: 14 plays, 80 yards, 7:36.

Fourth quarter

- SEA – Russell Wilson 1-yard run (Ryan Longwell kick), 13:01. Falcons 27–14. Drive: 8 plays, 80 yards, 4:10.
- SEA – Zach Miller 3-yard pass from Russell Wilson (Ryan Longwell kick), 9:13. Falcons 27–21. Drive: 4 plays, 62 yards, 1:50.
- SEA – Marshawn Lynch 2-yard run (Ryan Longwell kick), 0:31. Seahawks 28–27. Drive: 7 plays, 61 yards, 2:29.
- ATL – Matt Bryant 49-yard field goal, 0:08. Falcons 30–28. Drive: 3 plays, 41 yards, 0:23.

Top passers

- SEA – Russell Wilson – 24/36, 385 yards, 2 TD, INT
- ATL – Matt Ryan – 24/35, 250 yards, 3 TD, 2 INT

Top rushers

- SEA – Russell Wilson – 7 rushes, 60 yards, TD
- ATL – Michael Turner – 14 rushes, 98 yards

Top receivers

- SEA – Zach Miller – 8 receptions, 142 yards, TD
- ATL – Roddy White – 5 receptions, 76 yards, TD

The Falcons lost a 20-point lead in the fourth quarter, but won on Matt Bryant's 49-yard field goal, snapping the Falcons' postseason losing streak starting in the 2004 NFC Championship Game. The Seahawks attempted a final Hail Mary pass, but Russell Wilson's pass was intercepted by Julio Jones in the end zone, sending Atlanta to the NFC Championship Game. This game was ranked #2 on NFL.com's 20 Best Games of 2012 as Gamers.

==== NFC Championship: vs. #2 San Francisco 49ers ====
NFC Championship Game: (#2) San Francisco 49ers at (#1) Atlanta Falcons – Game summary

Quarter	1	2	3	4	Total
49ers	0	14	7	7	28
Falcons	10	14	0	0	24

at Georgia Dome, Atlanta, Georgia

- Date: January 20, 2013
- Game time: 3:00 p.m. EST
- Game weather: Played indoors (dome stadium)
- Referee: Terry McAulay
- TV announcers (Fox): Joe Buck, Troy Aikman and Pam Oliver

Game information

First quarter

- ATL – Julio Jones 46-yard pass from Matt Ryan (Matt Bryant kick), 11:24. Falcons 7–0. Drive: 7 plays, 80 yards, 3:36.
- ATL – Matt Bryant 35-yard field goal, 3:20. Falcons 10–0. Drive: 12 plays, 65 yards, 6:23.

Second quarter

- ATL – Julio Jones 20-yard pass from Matt Ryan (Matt Bryant kick), 14:54. Falcons 17–0. Drive: 4 plays, 57 yards, 1:55.
- SF – LaMichael James 15-yard run (David Akers kick), 8:08. Falcons 17–7. Drive: 7 plays, 82 yards, 4:29.
- SF – Vernon Davis 4-yard pass from Colin Kaepernick (David Akers kick), 1:55. Falcons 17–14. Drive: 7 plays, 82 yards, 4:13.
- ATL – Tony Gonzalez 10-yard pass from Matt Ryan (Matt Bryant kick), 0:25. Falcons 24–14. Drive: 7 plays, 80 yards, 1:30.

Third quarter

- SF – Frank Gore 5-yard run (David Akers kick), 10:47. Falcons 24–21. Drive: 7 plays, 82 yards, 4:13.

Fourth quarter

- SF – Frank Gore 9-yard run (David Akers kick), 8:23. 49ers 28–24. Drive: 6 plays, 38 yards, 3:23.

Top passers

- SF – Colin Kaepernick – 16/21, 233 yards, TD
- ATL – Matt Ryan – 30/42, 396 yards, 3 TD, INT

Top rushers

- SF – Frank Gore – 21 rushes, 90 yards, 2 TD
- ATL – Jacquizz Rodgers – 10 rushes, 32 yards

Top receivers

- SF – Vernon Davis – 5 receptions, 106 yards, TD
- ATL – Julio Jones – 11 receptions, 182 yards, 2 TD

With the loss, the Falcons finished their season 14–4. The Falcons lead the 49ers 24–14 at the half, but the 49ers responded with 14 unanswered points in the second half. This would be their final playoff appearance until their Super Bowl appearing 2016 season.

== Standings ==
NFC South
	W	L	T	PCT	DIV	CONF	PF	PA	STK
^{(1)} Atlanta Falcons	13	3	0	.813	3–3	9–3	419	299	L1
Carolina Panthers	7	9	0	.438	3–3	5–7	357	363	W4
New Orleans Saints	7	9	0	.438	3–3	5–7	461	454	L1
Tampa Bay Buccaneers	7	9	0	.438	3–3	4–8	389	394	W1
