= Kemal Ishmael =

American football player (born 1991)

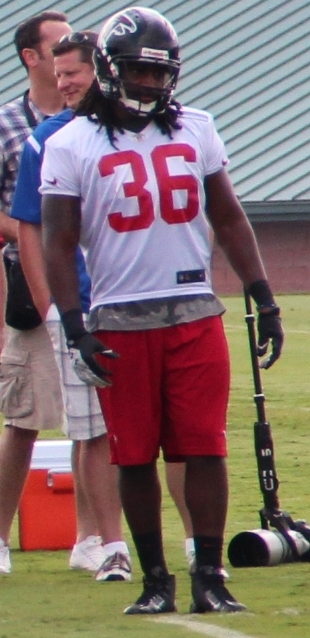
- Ishmael with the Atlanta Falcons in 2013

No. 36
- Positions: Linebacker; Safety

Personal information
- Born: May 6, 1991 (age 35); Miami, Florida, U.S.
- Listed height: 6 ft 0 in (1.83 m)
- Listed weight: 206 lb (93 kg)

Career information
- High school: North Miami Beach (North Miami Beach, Florida)
- College: UCF
- NFL draft: 2013: 7th round, 243rd overall pick

Career history
- Atlanta Falcons (2013–2019)

Awards and highlights
- C-USA Defensive Player of the Year (2012); 2× First-team All-C-USA (2010, 2012)

Career NFL statistics
- Total tackles: 290
- Pass deflections: 13
- Interceptions: 5
- Forced fumbles: 2
- Fumble recoveries: 3
- Defensive touchdowns: 1
- Stats at Pro Football Reference

Kemal Ishmael (born May 6, 1991) is an American former professional football player who was a linebacker and safety for the Atlanta Falcons of the National Football League (NFL). He played college football for the UCF Knights and was selected by the Atlanta Falcons in the seventh round of the 2013 NFL draft.

== College career ==
Ishmael played college football at the University of Central Florida.

== Professional career ==
=== 2013 season ===
In the 2013 NFL draft, Ishmael was selected in the seventh round with the 243rd overall pick by the Atlanta Falcons. In his rookie year, he got very little playing time. Head coach Mike Smith was worried he lacked the size and speed needed to start professionally and Ishmael was set to play behind veteran Thomas DeCoud and fellow rookie Zeke Motta. When both Motta and DeCoud were injured, Ishmael was active but only played three defensive snaps in all of 2013.

=== 2014 season ===
On September 18, 2014, Ishmael got his first career interception off Tampa Bay Buccaneers quarterback Josh McCown and returned it 23 yards for a touchdown on Thursday Night Football. From week 9 to 11, Ishmael had an interception in all three games.

=== 2015 season ===
Ishmael played in all 16 games with five starts in 2015, totalling 52 tackles with one interception against Blake Bortles and three passes defensed.

=== 2016 season ===
Ishmael played in 13 games with four starts in 2016, totaling 49 tackles playing at safety and linebacker throughout the season before being placed on injured reserve on December 16, 2016 with a shoulder injury. In the 2016 season, the Falcons would reach Super Bowl LI. Ishmael would not get to participate due to his injury.

=== 2017 season ===
On March 14, 2017, Ishmael signed a one-year, $2.5 million contract extension with the Falcons.

=== 2018 season ===
On April 4, 2018, Ishmael re-signed with the Falcons on a one-year contract.

=== 2019 season ===
On April 3, 2019, Ishmael re-signed with the Falcons on another one-year contract. On Wednesday July 24, 2019, it was announced that with strong safety J.J. Wilcox out for the season with a torn right ACL, Ishmael would return to his original position as SS and now see 75 percent of his practice time at safety and 25 percent at linebacker. On September 23, 2019, Ishmael took over the starting strong safety role he had earlier in his career after another season ending injury to Pro Bowl safety Keanu Neal after he tore his Achilles.

After becoming a free agent in March 2020, Ishmael had a tryout with the San Francisco 49ers on August 18, 2020.

== NFL career statistics ==
Legend
**Bold**	Career high

=== Regular season ===
Year	Team	Games		Tackles					Interceptions					Fumbles			
Year	Team	GP	GS	Cmb	Solo	Ast	Sck	TFL	Int	Yds	TD	Lng	PD	FF	FR	Yds	TD
2013	ATL	4	0	1	1	0	0.0	0	0	0	0	0	0	0	0	0	0
2014	ATL	**16**	**10**	**97**	**67**	**30**	0.0	**2**	**4**	37	**1**	23	**6**	**1**	**1**	**18**	0
2015	ATL	**16**	5	46	32	14	0.0	1	1	**84**	0	**84**	3	0	0	0	0
2016	ATL	13	4	52	32	20	0.0	0	0	0	0	0	2	0	0	0	0
2017	ATL	**16**	1	29	15	14	**1.0**	1	0	0	0	0	1	0	**1**	0	0
2018	ATL	**16**	0	21	11	10	0.0	0	0	0	0	0	1	0	**1**	0	0
2019	ATL	14	3	44	25	19	0.0	**2**	0	0	0	0	0	**1**	0	0	0
		95	23	290	183	107	1.0	6	5	121	1	84	13	2	3	18	0

=== Playoffs ===
Year	Team	Games		Tackles					Interceptions					Fumbles			
Year	Team	GP	GS	Cmb	Solo	Ast	Sck	TFL	Int	Yds	TD	Lng	PD	FF	FR	Yds	TD
2017	ATL	**2**	0	**7**	**6**	**1**	0.0	**1**	0	0	0	0	0	0	**1**	0	0
		2	0	7	6	1	0.0	1	0	0	0	0	0	0	1	0	0
