= Akeem Dent =

American football player and coach (born 1987)

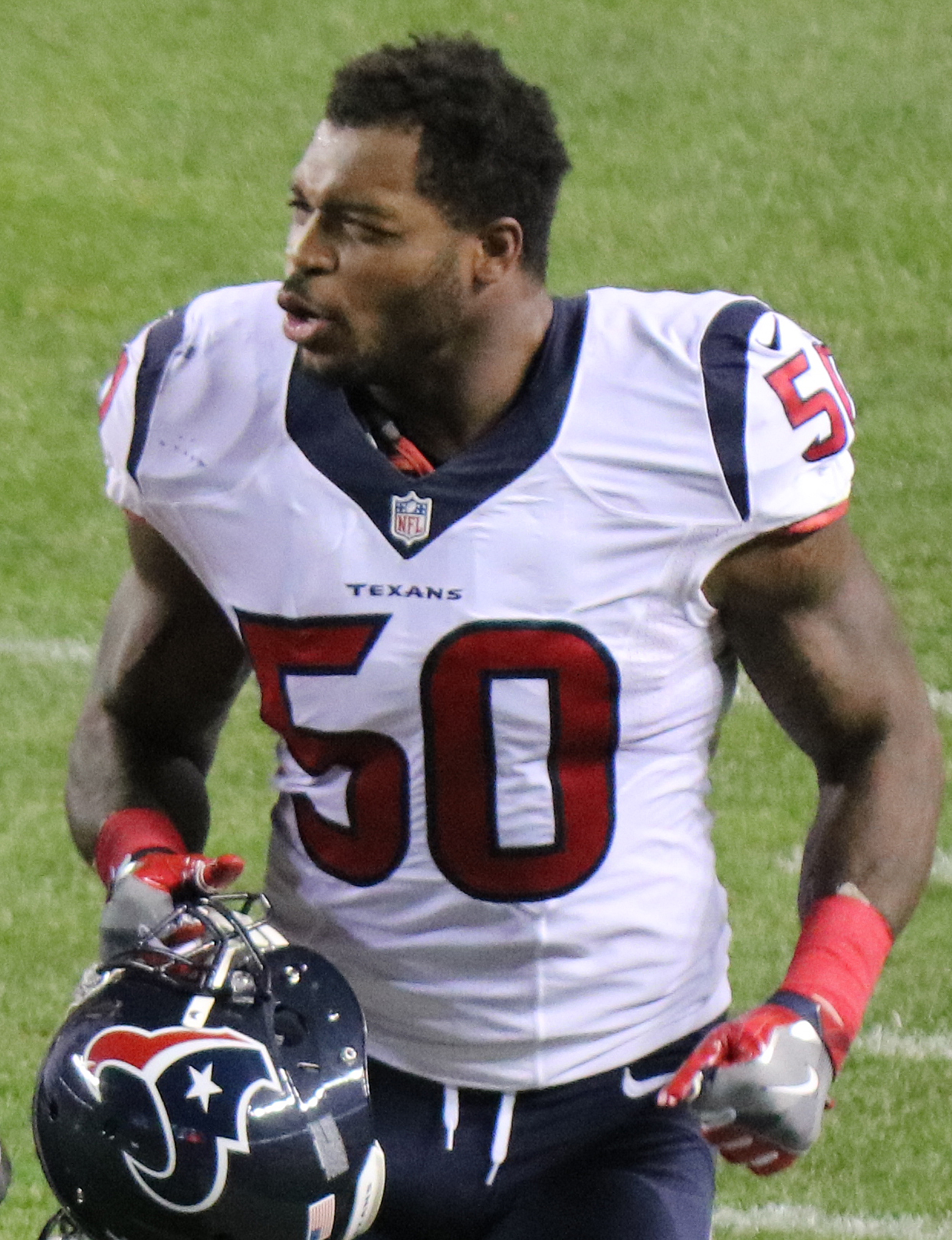
- Dent with the Houston Texans in 2016

Elon Phoenix
- Title: Outside linebackers coach

Personal information
- Born: September 24, 1987 (age 39); Atlanta, Georgia, U.S.
- Listed height: 6 ft 1 in (1.85 m)
- Listed weight: 250 lb (113 kg)

Career information
- High school: Douglass (Atlanta)
- College: Georgia
- NFL draft: 2011: 3rd round, 91st overall pick

Career history

Playing
- Atlanta Falcons (2011–2013); Houston Texans (2014–2016); Jacksonville Jaguars (2017)*
- * Offseason or practice squad member only

Coaching
- Colorado State (2018) Intern Linebackers; Houston Texans (2019–2020) Defensive assistant; Elon (2024) Assistant Defensive Line; Elon (2025–present) Outside Linebackers

Awards and highlights
- PFWA All-Rookie Team (2011); Second-team All-SEC (2010)

Career NFL statistics
- Total tackles: 203
- Sacks: 2.5
- Forced fumbles: 1
- Stats at Pro Football Reference

Akeem Dent (born September 24, 1987) is an American professional football coach and former player who is the outside linebackers coach for Elon of the Coastal Athletic Association (CAA). He played as a linebacker in the National Football League (NFL). He was selected by the Atlanta Falcons in the third round of the 2011 NFL draft. He played college football for the Georgia Bulldogs. He also played for the Houston Texans.

== Professional career ==
Pre-draft measurables
Height	Weight	Arm length	Hand span	Wingspan	40-yard dash	10-yard split	20-yard split	20-yard shuttle	Three-cone drill	Vertical jump	Broad jump	Bench press
6 ft 1 in (1.85 m)	242 lb (110 kg)	32 in (0.81 m)	10 in (0.25 m)	6 ft 6 7/8 in (2.00 m)	4.73 s	1.70 s	2.72 s	4.38 s	6.93 s	37.5 in (0.95 m)	10 ft 3 in (3.12 m)	24 reps
All values from NFL Combine/Pro Day

=== Atlanta Falcons ===
Dent was selected by the Atlanta Falcons in the third round (91st pick overall) of the 2011 NFL draft. He was signed by the team on July 28. Dent was selected to the Pro Football Weekly All-Rookie Team.

=== Houston Texans ===
On June 18, 2014, Dent was traded to the Houston Texans for quarterback T. J. Yates.

Dent signed a two-year contract to stay with the Texans on March 24, 2015.

=== Jacksonville Jaguars ===
On August 28, 2017, Dent signed with the Jacksonville Jaguars, only to be released on September 1.

== NFL career statistics ==
Year	Team	Games		Tackles				Interceptions		Fumbles	
Year	Team	GP	GS	Comb	Solo	Ast	Sack	PD	Int	FF	FR
2011	ATL	16	0	20	13	7	0.0	0	0	1	0
2012	ATL	16	13	65	42	23	0.0	2	0	0	0
2013	ATL	15	7	51	26	25	1.5	1	0	0	0
2014	HOU	15	7	38	25	13	1.0	0	0	0	0
2015	HOU	12	2	18	15	3	0.0	0	0	0	0
2016	HOU	16	3	11	9	2	0.0	0	0	0	0
Career		90	32	203	130	73	2.5	3	0	1	0

== Coaching career ==
=== Houston Texans ===
On February 5, 2019, Dent was hired as a defensive assistant for the Houston Texans of the National Football League (NFL).

=== Green Bay Packers ===
On May 11, 2022, Dent was announced as a member of the Green Bay Packers Bill Walsh Diversity Coaching Fellowship program.

=== Elon ===
On July 15, 2024, Dent was hired as the assistant defensive line coach at the Elon University under head coach Tony Trisciani.
