= Mike Smith (American football coach) =

American football coach (born 1959)

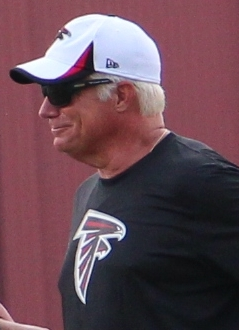
- Smith in 2013

Personal information
- Born: June 13, 1959 (age 67); Chicago, Illinois, U.S.

Career information
- High school: Father Lopez (Daytona Beach, Florida)
- College: East Tennessee State

Career history

Playing
- Winnipeg Blue Bombers (1982)

Coaching
- San Diego State (1982) Graduate assistant; San Diego State (1983–1985) Linebackers coach; Morehead State (1986) Defensive line coach; Tennessee Tech (1987) Defensive line coach; Tennessee Tech (1988–1995) Special teams coach; Tennessee Tech (1996–1998) Defensive coordinator; Baltimore Ravens (1999–2001) Defensive assistant & defensive line coach; Baltimore Ravens (2002) Linebackers coach; Jacksonville Jaguars (2003–2007) Defensive coordinator; Atlanta Falcons (2008–2014) Head coach; Tampa Bay Buccaneers (2016–2018) Defensive coordinator

Awards and highlights
- Super Bowl champion (XXXV); AP NFL Coach of the Year (2008); 3× Sporting News NFL Coach of the Year Award (2008, 2010, 2012)

Head coaching record
- Regular season: 66–46 (.589)
- Postseason: 1–4 (.200)
- Career: 67–50 (.573)
- Coaching profile at Pro Football Reference

Mike Smith (born June 13, 1959) is an American former football coach and player. He served as the head coach of the Atlanta Falcons from 2008 to 2014. Smith has also served as the defensive coordinator for the Jacksonville Jaguars and Tampa Bay Buccaneers. During his tenure in Atlanta, Smith became the franchise's winningest head coach by number of wins in addition to being the recipient of the 2008 NFL Coach of the Year Award by the Associated Press and was also voted NFL Coach of the Year Award by the Sporting News in 2008, 2010, and 2012.

== Early life ==
Raised in Daytona Beach, Florida, Smith played linebacker at Father Lopez Catholic High School, earning all-state honors. He played collegiately for East Tennessee State University between 1977 and 1981 and was chosen as defensive MVP twice. Smith briefly played professionally for the Winnipeg Blue Bombers of the Canadian Football League for the 1982 season before retiring as a player.

== Coaching career ==
=== College coaching ===
Smith decided to take up coaching after his playing days were over, starting in various assistant capacities with several Division I colleges before moving on to the NFL: San Diego State (1982–1985), Morehead State (1986) and Tennessee Tech (1987–1998).

=== Baltimore Ravens ===
Smith's first NFL job was as defensive assistant/defensive line coach for the Baltimore Ravens in 1999 under defensive line coach Rex Ryan for three seasons. In 2002, Smith was promoted to linebackers' coach for head coach Brian Billick, tutoring such future standouts as Ray Lewis, Peter Boulware, Jamie Sharper and Adalius Thomas, and in that capacity helped the 2000 Ravens win Super Bowl XXXV.

=== Jacksonville Jaguars ===
On January 21, 2003, Smith became the defensive coordinator of the Jacksonville Jaguars under new head coach Jack Del Rio.

=== Atlanta Falcons ===
In 2008, Smith became head coach for the first time at any level, taking charge of the Atlanta Falcons. He started off his first season by installing rookie Matt Ryan as starting quarterback to open the season against the Detroit Lions. In his debut as an NFL head coach, the Falcons beat the Lions 34–21. Atlanta's 216 yards of total offense in the first quarter was the highest in over two decades, eclipsing their October 13, 1991, mark of 172 yards against San Francisco. The first loss of the year against the Tampa Bay Buccaneers, was mitigated by winning Smith's first coach's challenge, on the spotting of the ball after a Roddy White reception in the third quarter, giving the Falcons a first down and keeping the drive alive. Stars like Michael Turner, Roddy White, Michael Jenkins and John Abraham helped carry the Falcons to an 11–5 record and their first playoff berth since 2004. In the Wild Card Round, the Falcons lost to the eventual NFC champions, the Arizona Cardinals. Smith was named the 2008 AP Coach of the Year and NFL Coach of the Year, beating out Miami Dolphins head coach Tony Sparano in the voting.

In 2009, Smith and the Falcons overcame a difficult schedule and several key injuries (to QB Ryan and RB Turner) to end with a 9–7 record and second place in the NFC South. While they failed to reach the playoffs, this marked the first time in franchise history that the Falcons had consecutive winning seasons.

In 2010, Smith led the Falcons to an NFC-best season record of 13–3, earning the team's second NFC South title and fourth divisional championship overall before being beaten at home by the eventual Super Bowl XLV champion Green Bay Packers by a score of 48–21 in the Divisional Round.

In 2011, the Falcons finished 10–6 and qualified for the playoffs, but they lost in the Wild Card round to the eventual Super Bowl XLVI champion New York Giants.

In 2012, Smith led the Falcons to a league-best 13–3 record and recorded his first win in the postseason as Falcons head coach, narrowly edging the Seattle Seahawks 30–28 in the 2012 NFC Divisional Playoffs. With the win, Atlanta also made their third all-time appearance in the NFC Championship Game and hosted the game for the first time in their history against the San Francisco 49ers. The Falcons lost 28–24 despite a 17–0 lead in the second quarter. That same year, Smith earned his 50th win by defeating the Philadelphia Eagles on October 28, passing Dan Reeves as the best-performing coach in Falcons history by number of wins. Smith reached 50 wins in 71 games, which was good for third best all-time since the AFL-NFL merger in 1970, surpassed only by Chuck Knox who earned his 50th win in 65 games and by George Seifert in 62 games. Smith was named Sporting News 2012 Coach of the Year for the third time by a pool of 27 NFL coaches and executives.

In 2013, the Falcons slumped to a 4–12 record, and Smith was eventually named the head coach of the North Team in the 2014 Senior Bowl.

On December 28, 2014, multiple media outlets reported that the Falcons had hired Korn Ferry, a reputed firm, to assist in finding potential candidates to replace Smith should he be fired. Later that day, the Falcons lost to the Carolina Panthers by a score of 34–3. The game determined the NFC South champion, despite both teams having a losing record. The next day, Smith was fired after two consecutive losing seasons as the Falcons finished the 2014 season with a 6–10 record.

=== Tampa Bay Buccaneers ===
On January 15, 2016, Smith was named the defensive coordinator for the Tampa Bay Buccaneers, under former assistant Dirk Koetter, who was named the Buccaneers' head coach that same day.

On October 15, 2018, Smith was fired after leading the Buccaneers to the league's worst defense through the first six weeks of the season. Following his departure from the Buccaneers, Smith announced in a SirusXM radio interview that he was retiring from coaching.

=== College all-star games ===
In January 2020, Smith coached Team Aina in the Hula Bowl, a college football postseason all-star game. He returned as head coach of the same squad in 2022, 2023, and 2024.

In 2026, he participated in The American Bowl as coach of the Warhawks.

=== Head coaching record ===
Team	Year	Regular season					Postseason			
Team	Year	Won	Lost	Ties	Win %	Finish	Won	Lost	Win %	Result
ATL	2008	11	5	0	.688	2nd in NFC South	0	1	.000	Lost to Arizona Cardinals in NFC Wild Card Game
ATL	2009	9	7	0	.563	2nd in NFC South	-	-	-	-
ATL	2010	13	3	0	.813	1st in NFC South	0	1	.000	Lost to Green Bay Packers in NFC Divisional Game
ATL	2011	10	6	0	.625	2nd in NFC South	0	1	.000	Lost to New York Giants in NFC Wild Card Game
ATL	2012	13	3	0	.813	1st in NFC South	1	1	.500	Lost to San Francisco 49ers in NFC Championship Game
ATL	2013	4	12	0	.250	3rd in NFC South	-	-	-	-
ATL	2014	6	10	0	.375	3rd in NFC South	-	-	-	-
ATL Total		66	46	0	.589		1	4	.200	
Total		66	46	0	.589		1	4	.200	

== Personal life ==
Smith is the oldest of eight children. He and his wife, Julie, have a daughter, Logan. Smith is the brother-in-law of former NFL head coach Brian Billick.
