= Stansly Maponga =

Zimbabwean-born American football player (born 1991)

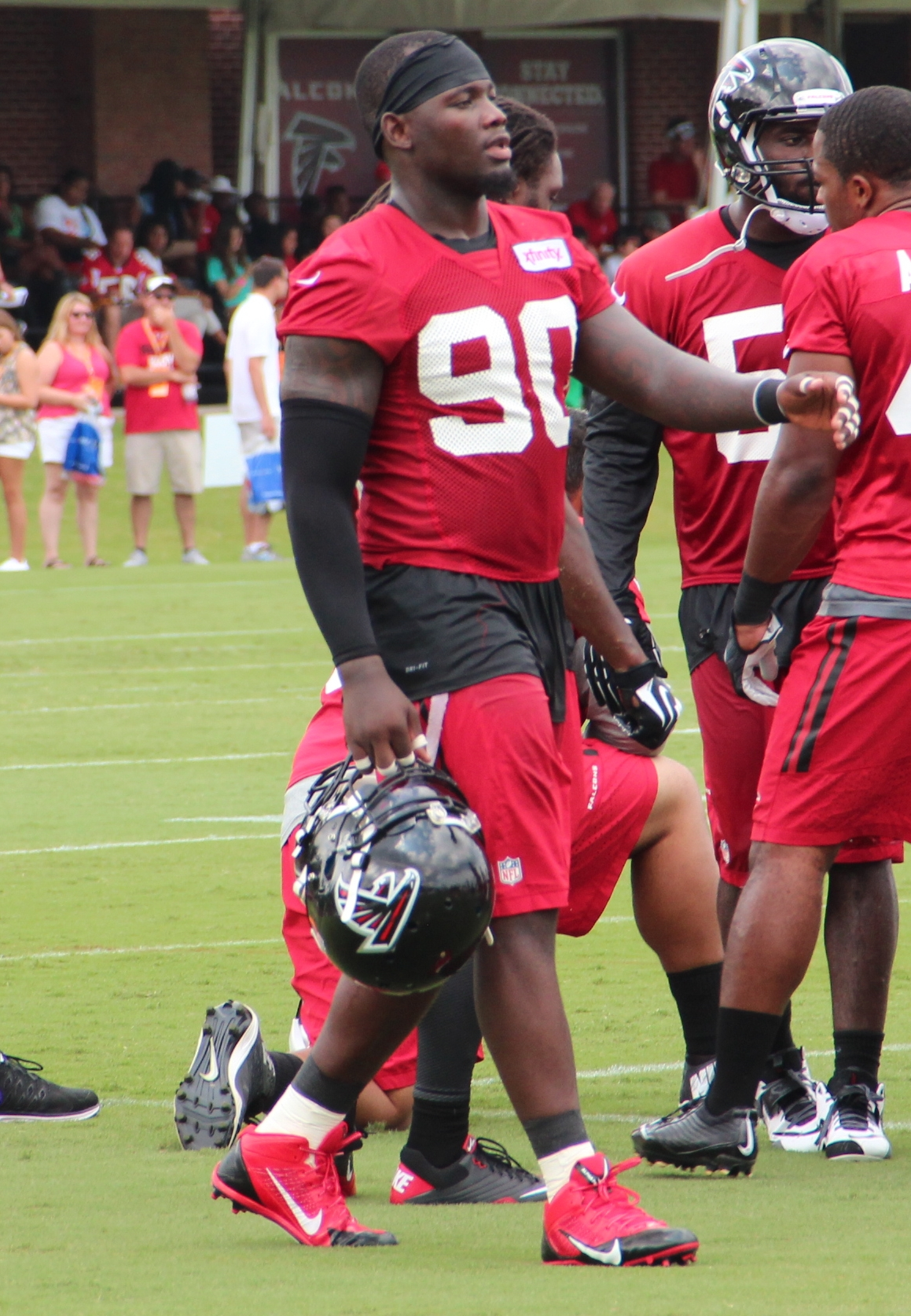
- Maponga with the Atlanta Falcons in 2015

No. 99, 90, 71
- Position: Defensive end

Personal information
- Born: March 5, 1991 (age 35); Harare, Zimbabwe
- Listed height: 6 ft 2 in (1.88 m)
- Listed weight: 257 lb (117 kg)

Career information
- High school: Hebron (Carrollton, Texas, U.S.)
- College: Texas Christian
- NFL draft: 2013: 5th round, 153rd overall pick

Career history
- Atlanta Falcons (2013–2015); New York Giants (2015–2016); Dallas Cowboys (2017)*; Denver Broncos (2017–2018)*; Seattle Dragons (2020); Ottawa Redblacks (2021–2022); Orlando Guardians (2023)
- * Offseason or practice squad member only

Awards and highlights
- Second-team All-American (2010); First-team All-Big 12 (2012); First-team All-MWC (2011)

Career NFL statistics
- Total tackles: 8
- Sacks: 1
- Fumble recoveries: 2
- Stats at Pro Football Reference

Stansly Maponga Sr. (born March 5, 1991) is a Zimbabwean-American former professional football defensive end. He was selected by the Atlanta Falcons in the fifth round of the 2013 NFL draft. He played college football at TCU.

== Early life ==
Maponga was born in Zimbabwe to Barbara Green. He attended Hebron high school in Carrollton, Texas where during his senior year Maponga's athletic talent in football aided the team in overcoming an 0–6 season record to win the district championship.

== College career ==
After his redshirt season in 2009, Maponga started 12 games in the 2010 season as a defensive lineman for Texas Christian University's Horned Frogs. His accomplishments during his first season of active play included being named to the second-team Freshman All-American selection by CollegeFootballNews.com and named to the second-team All-Mountain West Conference. He ranked ninth on the team and second on the defensive front. During the 2011 season Maponga made the first-team All-Mountain West selection and the Ted Hendricks Award Midseason Watch List. During his junior season in 2012, Maponga started 9 of 11 games before missing two games resulting from injuries. His performances earned him selection to the All-Big 12 first-team and the AP All-Big 12 second-team. After only three seasons, Maponga opted to enter the 2013 NFL draft.

== Professional career ==
=== Atlanta Falcons ===
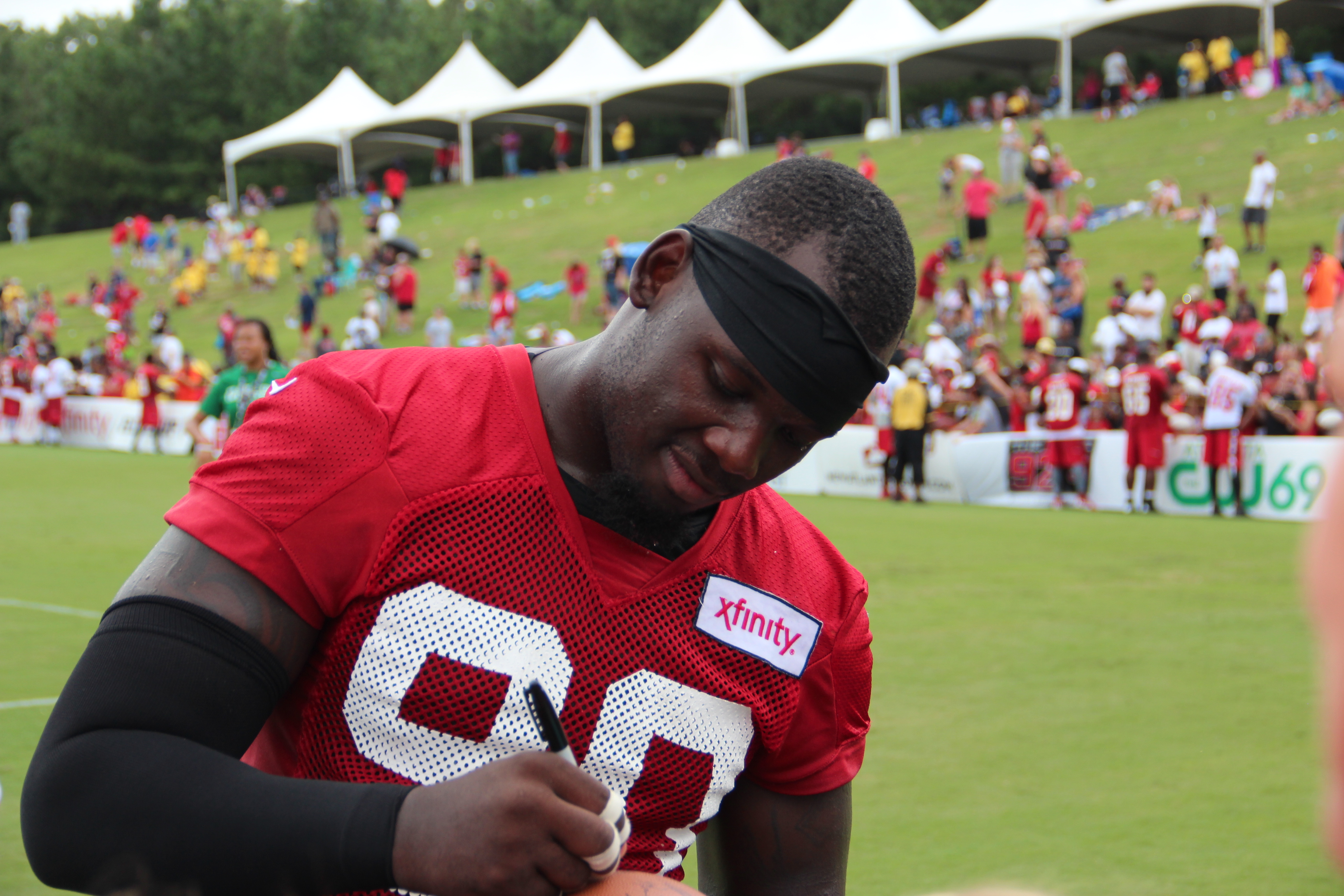
Maponga with the Falcons in 2015

Maponga was selected in the fifth round of the 2013 NFL draft with the 153rd overall pick by the Atlanta Falcons. On September 5, 2015, Maponga was waived by the Falcons in the final cuts before the start of the regular season. On September 7, 2015, he was signed to the Falcons' practice squad.

=== New York Giants ===
On December 12, 2015, the New York Giants signed Maponga off the Atlanta Falcons' practice squad. On September 3, 2016, he was released by the Giants. The next day, he was signed to the Giants practice squad. He signed a reserve/future contract with the Giants on January 9, 2017. He was waived by the team on September 2, 2017.

=== Dallas Cowboys ===
On October 25, 2017, Maponga was signed to the Dallas Cowboys' practice squad. He was released on November 2, 2017.

=== Denver Broncos ===
On November 21, 2017, Maponga was signed to the Denver Broncos' practice squad. He signed a reserve/future contract with the Broncos on January 1, 2018. Maponga was released by the Broncos on August 13, 2018.

=== Seattle Dragons ===
In October 2019, Maponga was drafted by the XFL to play for the Seattle Dragons. He had his contract terminated when the league suspended operations on April 10, 2020.

=== Ottawa Redblacks ===
Maponga signed with the Ottawa Redblacks of the CFL on March 9, 2021.

=== Orlando Guardians ===
On November 17, 2022, Maponga was drafted by the Orlando Guardians of the XFL. The Guardians folded when the XFL and USFL merged to create the United Football League (UFL).
