= Lamar Holmes =

American football player (born 1989)

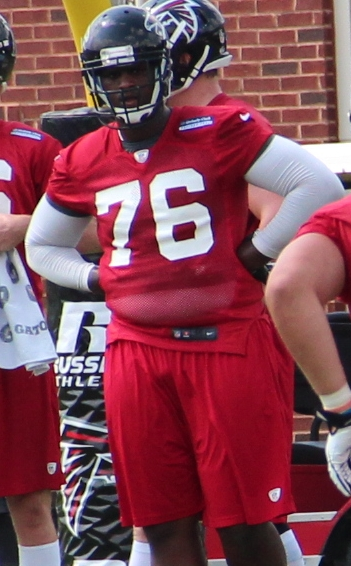
- Holmes with the Falcons in 2013

No. 76
- Position: Offensive tackle

Personal information
- Born: July 8, 1989 (age 37); Gastonia, North Carolina, U.S.
- Listed height: 6 ft 5 in (1.96 m)
- Listed weight: 333 lb (151 kg)

Career information
- High school: Hunter Huss (Gastonia)
- College: Southern Miss
- NFL draft: 2012: 3rd round, 91st overall pick

Career history
- Atlanta Falcons (2012–2015); Detroit Lions (2016)*; Hamilton Tiger-Cats (2017)
- * Offseason or practice squad member only

Awards and highlights
- First-team All-C-USA (2011)

Career NFL statistics
- Games played: 21
- Games started: 19
- Stats at Pro Football Reference
- Stats at CFL.ca

Lamar Holmes (born July 8, 1989) is an American former professional football player who was an offensive tackle in the National Football League (NFL) and Canadian Football League (CFL). He was selected by the Atlanta Falcons in the third round of the 2012 NFL draft. Holmes played college football for the Southern Miss Golden Eagles.

== Early life ==
Holmes is from Gastonia, North Carolina, and attended Hunter Huss High School.

== Professional career ==
Pre-draft measurables
Height	Weight	Arm length	Hand span	40-yard dash	20-yard shuttle	Three-cone drill	Vertical jump	Broad jump	Bench press
6 ft 5 3/8 in (1.97 m)	323 lb (147 kg)	35 1/4 in (0.90 m)	9 5/8 in (0.24 m)	5.41 s	4.80 s	7.74 s	27.0 in (0.69 m)	8 ft 8 in (2.64 m)	22 reps
All values from NFL Combine

=== Atlanta Falcons ===
Holmes was selected by the Atlanta Falcons in the third round (91st pick overall) of the 2012 NFL draft. On September 8, 2013, Holmes played his first career start at right tackle against the New Orleans Saints. Holmes played in all 16 games with 15 starts seeing time at both right and left tackle. Holmes blocked for an offense that averaged 343.1 total yards per game in 2013, including 283.8 passing yards per game, which was the second-highest average in club history. Holmes started at right tackle and blocked for an offense that set a franchise record for total yards with 568 yards against the New Orleans Saints on September 7, 2014. Holmes started and helped block for an offense that scored 56 points (2nd most in team history) and recorded 488 total yards against the Tampa Bay Buccaneers on September 18, 2014. On December 5, 2015 Holmes was released with an injury settlement.

=== Detroit Lions ===
On February 12, 2016, Holmes signed with the Detroit Lions. On May 13, 2016, the Lions released Holmes.

=== Hamilton Tiger-Cats ===
Holmes played in seven games, all starts, for the Hamilton Tiger-Cats in 2017.
