= Harland Gunn =

American football player (born 1989)

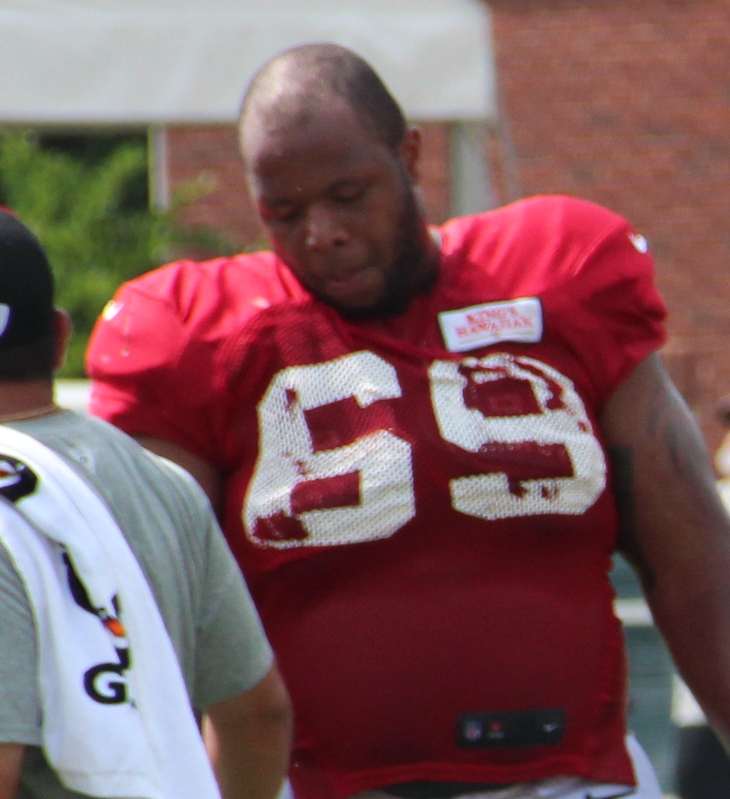
- Gunn with the Atlanta Falcons

No. 69
- Position: Offensive guard

Personal information
- Born: August 30, 1989 (age 37); Omaha, Nebraska, U.S.
- Listed height: 6 ft 2 in (1.88 m)
- Listed weight: 310 lb (141 kg)

Career information
- High school: Omaha Central
- College: Miami (FL)
- NFL draft: 2012: undrafted

Career history
- Dallas Cowboys (2012)*; New Orleans Saints (2012)*; Atlanta Falcons (2012−2014); New England Patriots (2015)*; Indianapolis Colts (2015)*
- * Offseason or practice squad member only

Career NFL statistics
- Games played: 13
- Games Started: 1
- Stats at Pro Football Reference

Harland Gunn (born August 30, 1989) is an American former professional football player who was an offensive guard in the National Football League (NFL) for the New Orleans Saints and Atlanta Falcons. He was signed by the Dallas Cowboys as an undrafted free agent in 2012. He played college football for the Miami Hurricanes.

== Early life ==
Gunn attended Omaha Central High School. As a senior, he received All-state honors at offensive tackle.

He accepted a football scholarship from the University of Miami. He started 30 out of 38 career games at both guard positions. As a redshirt freshman, he only played in the season opener against Charleston Southern University.

As a sophomore, he started 5 out of 13 games at right guard. As a junior, he started all 13 games at right guard.

As a senior, he started all 12 games at left guard, while not allowing a sack nor committing a single penalty.

== Professional career ==
=== Dallas Cowboys ===
Gunn was signed as an undrafted free agent by the Dallas Cowboys after the 2012 NFL draft on April 29. He was waived on August 31.

=== New Orleans Saints ===
On September 2, 2012, Gunn was signed to the New Orleans Saints practice squad.

=== Atlanta Falcons ===
On November 20, 2012, Gunn was signed by the Atlanta Falcons from the Saints practice squad. He was declared inactive for the final 6 games of the season. In 2013, he appeared in 3 games and was declared inactive in 13.

On August 30, 2014, he was released and signed to the practice squad the next day. On September 30, he was promoted to the active roster. He appeared in 10 games with one start. He was released on August 1, 2015.

=== New England Patriots ===
On August 2, 2015, Gunn was claimed on waivers by the New England Patriots. On August 6, he was released to make room for offensive guard Mark Asper.

=== Indianapolis Colts ===
On August 21, 2015, Gunn was signed by the Indianapolis Colts. He was released On August 31.
