= Drew Davis =

American football player and coach (born 1989)

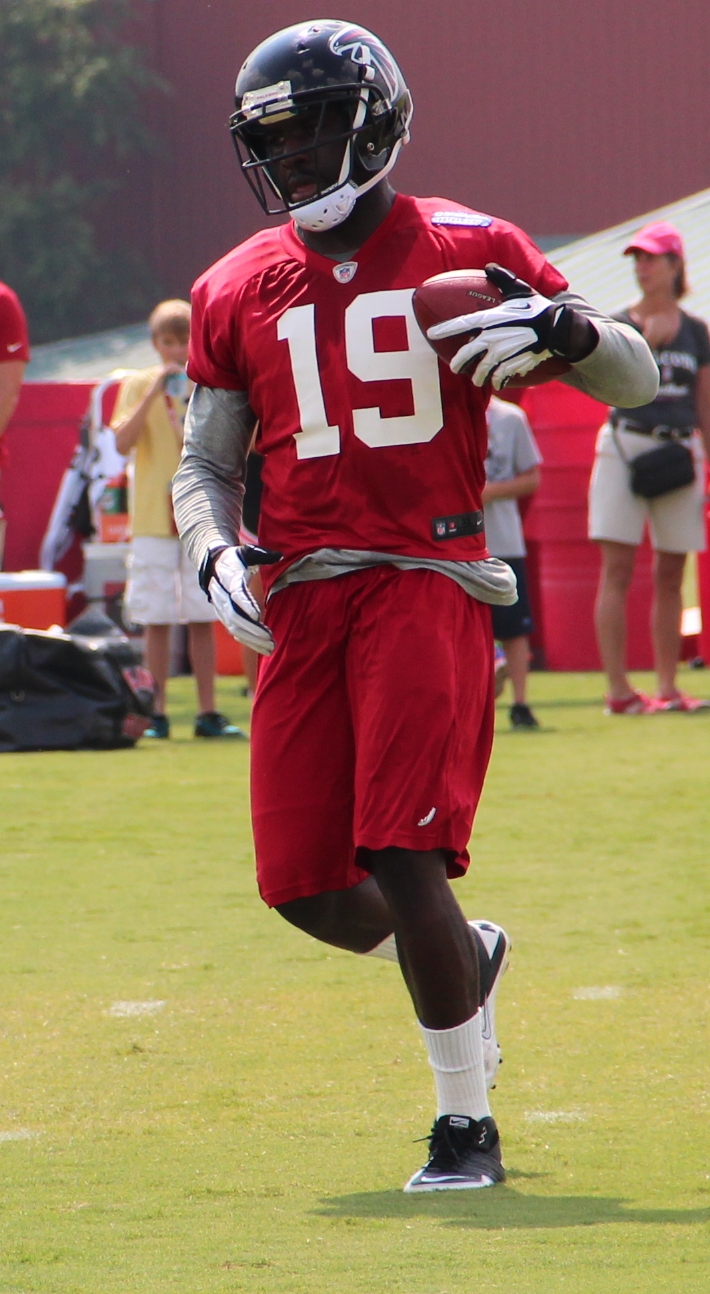
- Davis with the Atlanta Falcons in 2013

UCLA Bruins
- Title: Director of player development

Personal information
- Born: January 4, 1989 (age 37); Denver, Colorado, U.S.
- Listed height: 6 ft 1 in (1.85 m)
- Listed weight: 205 lb (93 kg)

Career information
- Position: Wide receiver (No. 19)
- High school: Montbello (Denver)
- College: Oregon (2007–2011)
- NFL draft: 2011: undrafted

Career history

Playing
- Atlanta Falcons (2011–2014)

Coaching
- UCF (2016–2017) Graduate assistant; UCLA (2018–2022) Director of player development

Career NFL statistics
- Receptions: 16
- Receiving yards: 256
- Receiving touchdowns: 3
- Stats at Pro Football Reference

Drew "D.J." Davis (born January 4, 1989) is an American former professional football player who was a wide receiver in the National Football League (NFL). He played college football for the Oregon Ducks. The Atlanta Falcons signed him as an undrafted free agent in 2011 after the NFL lockout ended.

== Professional career ==
Davis signed with the Atlanta Falcons as an undrafted free agent on July 26, 2011. He was released on September 3 for final roster cuts before the start of the 2011 season. The next day, he was added to the team's practice squad.

Davis was released again on August 31, 2012, for final roster cuts for the 2012 season and signed to practice squad the next day. On September 8, he was promoted to the active 53-man roster. He made his NFL debut in the Week 1 win against the Kansas City Chiefs. In week 8, Davis scored his first touchdown against the Philadelphia Eagles on a 15-yard pass by Matt Ryan.
