= Charles Mitchell (American football) =

American football player (born 1989)

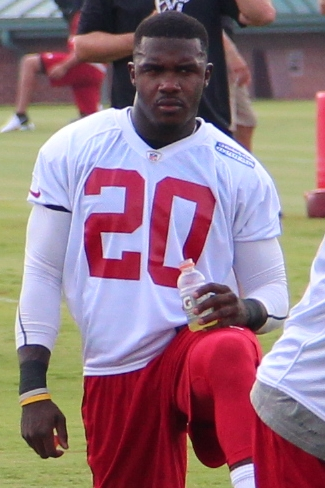
- Mitchell with the Atlanta Falcons in 2013

No. 26
- Position: Safety

Personal information
- Born: September 13, 1989 (age 37); Lyon, Mississippi, U.S.
- Listed height: 5 ft 11 in (1.80 m)
- Listed weight: 205 lb (93 kg)

Career information
- High school: Clarksdale (Clarksdale, Mississippi)
- College: Mississippi State
- NFL draft: 2012: 6th round, 192nd overall pick

Career history
- Atlanta Falcons (2012); Denver Broncos (2014)*
- * Offseason or practice squad member only

Career NFL statistics
- Total tackles: 2
- Stats at Pro Football Reference

Charles D. Mitchell (born September 13, 1989) is an American former professional football player who was a safety in the National Football League (NFL). He was selected by the Atlanta Falcons in the sixth round, 192nd overall, in the 2012 NFL draft. He played college football at Mississippi State.

== Early life ==
Mitchell played high school football at Clarksdale High School in Clarksdale, Mississippi. He recorded 78 tackles, including four sacks, and two interceptions his senior year, earning Gatorade Player of the Year honors for the state of Mississippi.

== College career ==
Mitchell played for the Mississippi State Bulldogs from 2008 to 2011. He played in 50 games during his college career, totaling 161 solo tackles, 122 assisted tackles, four interceptions (one of which was returned for a touchdown), five pass breakups, one sack, and one forced fumble.

== Professional career ==
Mitchell was selected by the Atlanta Falcons in the sixth round, 192nd overall, in the 2012 NFL draft. He officially signed with the team on May 14, 2012. He played in ten games for the Falcons in 2012, recording one solo tackle and one assisted tackle. Mitchell was waived on August 30, 2013.

Mitchell signed a reserve/future contract with the Denver Broncos on January 22, 2014. He was waived on May 12, 2014 and re-signed by the Broncos on May 19, 2014. Mitchell was waived again on August 25, 2014.
