= Kevin Cone =

American football player (born 1988)

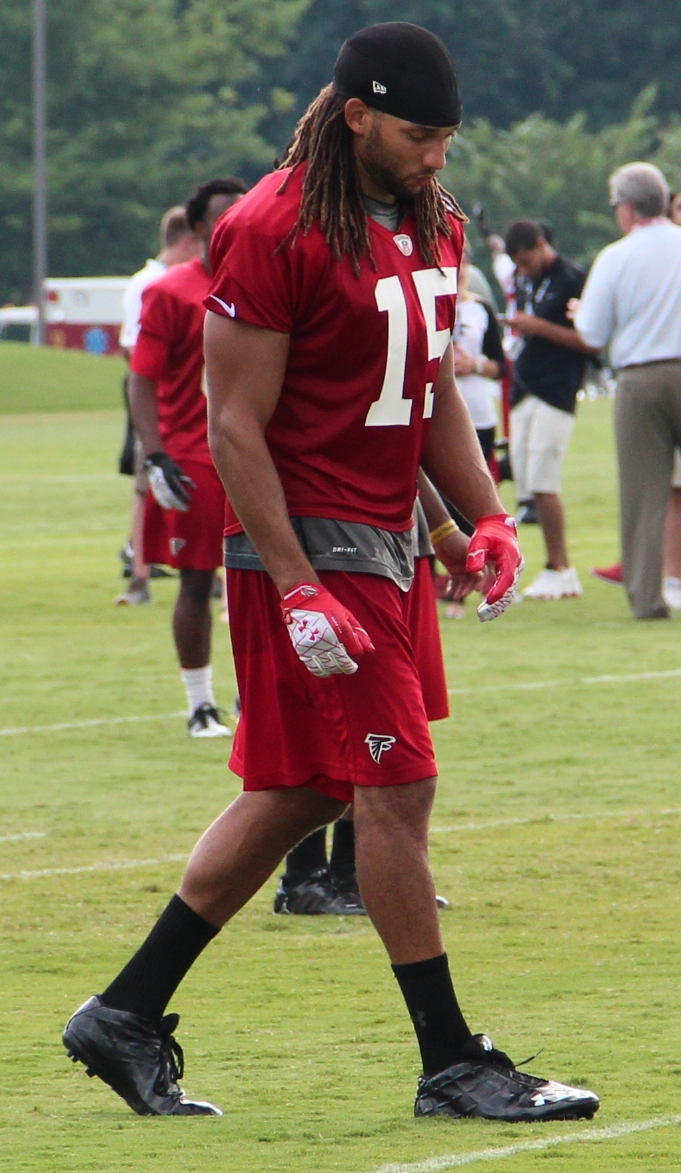
- Cone with the Atlanta Falcons in 2013

No. 12, 15, 84
- Position: Wide receiver

Personal information
- Born: March 20, 1988 (age 38); Stone Mountain, Georgia, U.S.
- Listed height: 6 ft 2 in (1.88 m)
- Listed weight: 216 lb (98 kg)

Career information
- High school: St. Pius X Catholic (Atlanta, Georgia)
- College: Georgia Tech
- NFL draft: 2011: undrafted

Career history
- Atlanta Falcons (2011–2013); Miami Dolphins (2014)*; Arizona Cardinals (2014)*; Tampa Bay Buccaneers (2014)*; Cleveland Browns (2014–2015)*; Miami Dolphins (2015)*; Winnipeg Blue Bombers (2015–2016)
- * Offseason or practice squad member only

Career NFL statistics
- Receptions: 1
- Receiving yards: 12
- Total tackles: 10
- Stats at Pro Football Reference

Kevin Lamar Cone (born March 20, 1988) is an American former professional football player who was a wide receiver in the National Football League (NFL). He played college football for the Georgia Tech Yellow Jackets and was signed by the Atlanta Falcons as an undrafted free agent in 2011.

== Early life ==
Cone went to St. Pius X High School in Atlanta, Georgia. After he graduated high school he attended Shorter College and played football during the 2006 and 2007 seasons. He transferred to Georgia Tech and joined their football program as a walk-on in April 2008. After a redshirt year, he was awarded a football scholarship in August 2009.

Cone obtained a bachelor's degree in Mechanical Engineering at Georgia Tech on Dec. 18, 2010. Cone also studied for a master's degree in Business Administration and Management at Georgia State University.

== Professional career ==
Cone was not selected in the NFL draft. After graduation, he began work with Westinghouse as an intern in Pittsburgh. During this period, he trained with other NFL hopefuls waiting for future football opportunities.

=== Atlanta Falcons ===
Cone received his opportunity as undrafted free agent when the Atlanta Falcons added him to their roster after it was depleted by injuries in preseason camp. He spent most of his first year on the Falcons practice squad, but did get into a game late in the season.

Cone played in 29 games with the Atlanta Falcons from 2011-2013. He played primarily on special teams, but did catch a 49-yard touchdown in a pre-season game against the Jacksonville Jaguars on Aug 30, 2012.

Cone was released by the Atlanta Falcons on March 19, 2014.

=== Miami Dolphins (first stint) ===
Cone signed with the Miami Dolphins on April 2, 2014. He was waived on August 30, 2014.

=== Arizona Cardinals ===
Cone was signed to the practice squad of the Arizona Cardinals on September 2, 2014. He was released on September 9, 2014.

=== Tampa Bay Buccaneers ===
Cone was signed to the practice squad of the Tampa Bay Buccaneers on September 30, 2014. He was released on October 13, 2014.

=== Cleveland Browns ===
Cone was signed to the Cleveland Browns' practice squad on October 15, 2014. He signed a reserve/future contract with the Browns on December 29, 2014. He was later waived on August 3, 2015.

=== Miami Dolphins (second stint) ===
Cone re-signed with the Dolphins on August 4, 2015. On August 30, 2015, he was released by the Dolphins.

=== Winnipeg Blue Bombers ===
Cone played in, and started, one game for the Winnipeg Blue Bombers of the Canadian Football League in 2015. He was targeted once but did not catch the pass. He retired from the Blue Bombers in 2016 and briefly worked as Mechanical Engineer for Morrison Hershfield. In January 2017, Cone accepted the position of Assistant Director of Football Operations at Georgia Tech.

== Family ==
Cone is the son of Ronny and Janet Cone. Both his parents graduated from Georgia Tech and his father played football at Tech from 1979-83. He has one brother named Zach and one sister named Amy.
