= 2007 Tampa Bay Buccaneers season =

NFL team season

- Owner: Malcolm Glazer
- General manager: Bruce Allen
- Head coach: Jon Gruden
- Offensive coordinator: Bill Muir
- Defensive coordinator: Monte Kiffin
- Home stadium: Raymond James Stadium

Results
- Record: 9–7
- Division place: 1st NFC South
- Playoffs: Lost Wild Card Playoffs (vs. Giants) 14–24
- Pro Bowlers: QB Jeff Garcia
- Team MVP: QB Jeff Garcia

The 2007 season was the Tampa Bay Buccaneers' 32nd in the National Football League (NFL), the 10th playing their home games at Raymond James Stadium, and the sixth under head coach Jon Gruden. On December 16, 2007, they clinched the NFC South division title, and returned to the playoffs after missing it in 2006. However, they were defeated 24–14 in the Wildcard Round by the eventual Super Bowl champion New York Giants. The Wildcard game was Jon Gruden's final playoff appearance as head coach of the Buccaneers before being dismissed at the conclusion of the next season. This would be the last season the Buccaneers qualified for the playoffs until 2020, and the last season the Buccaneers won their division until 2021.

On December 16, in a game against the Atlanta Falcons, Micheal Spurlock scored the first kickoff return touchdown in franchise history, snapping a streak of 32 seasons, 497 games (at 53 stadiums in 38 cities), 139 individuals, and 1,864 unsuccessful attempts. The play earned Spurlock the NFC Special Teams Player of the Week award.

== Staff ==
2007 Tampa Bay Buccaneers staff
Front office: Owner/President – Malcolm Glazer; Executive vice president – Bryan Glazer; Executive vice president – Edward Glazer; Executive vice president – Joel Glazer; general manager – Bruce Allen; Director of football operations – Mark Arteaga; Director of pro personnel – Mark Dominik; Director of College Scouting - Dennis Hickey; Head coaches: Head coach – Jon Gruden; Assistant head coach/defensive line – Larry Coyer; Assistant head coach/running backs – Art Valero; Assistant to head coach/football operations – Paul Kelly; Offensive coaches: Offensive coordinator/offensive line – Bill Muir; Quarterbacks – Paul Hackett; Wide receivers – Richard Mann; Tight ends – Bob Casullo; Senior assistant/offensive line – Aaron Kromer; Offensive assistant – Jay Gruden; Offensive quality control – Tim Berbenich; Offensive quality control – Nathaniel Hackett	Defensive coaches: Defensive coordinator – Monte Kiffin; Linebackers – Gus Bradley; Defensive backs – Raheem Morris; Assistant defensive backs – Jimmy Lake; Defensive quality control – Ejiro Evero; Defensive quality control – Todd Wash; Special teams coaches: Special teams coordinator – Richard Bisaccia; Coaching assistant – Dwayne Stukes; Strength and conditioning: Head strength and conditioning – Mike Morris; Assistant strength and conditioning – Kurt Schultz

== Offseason ==
The 2007 offseason proved to be productive for the Buccaneers. General manager Bruce Allen and head coach Jon Gruden had approximately US$24 million in salary cap space with which to maneuver during free agency. They made a splash on the first day of free agency by signing two quarterbacks: unrestricted free agent Jeff Garcia (Eagles) and Jake Plummer (Broncos) in a trade for a conditional pick in the 2008 draft (believed to be a 4th round selection if Plummer played). Controversy soon followed as Plummer announced his retirement on the same day, citing his health and his lack of a desire to compete for a job and learn a new system. However, he did not complete his retirement paperwork with the league. Many believed that Plummer was simply trying to retire so that he could later unretire and play for the Texans. They are led by his former coach Gary Kubiak, under whom Plummer played his best three years of football. The league reviewed the trade to make sure that Plummer had not retired before the trade (a retired player cannot be traded), but he had not and his rights officially belong to the Buccaneers. Other free agent losses and signings are as follows:

Signings

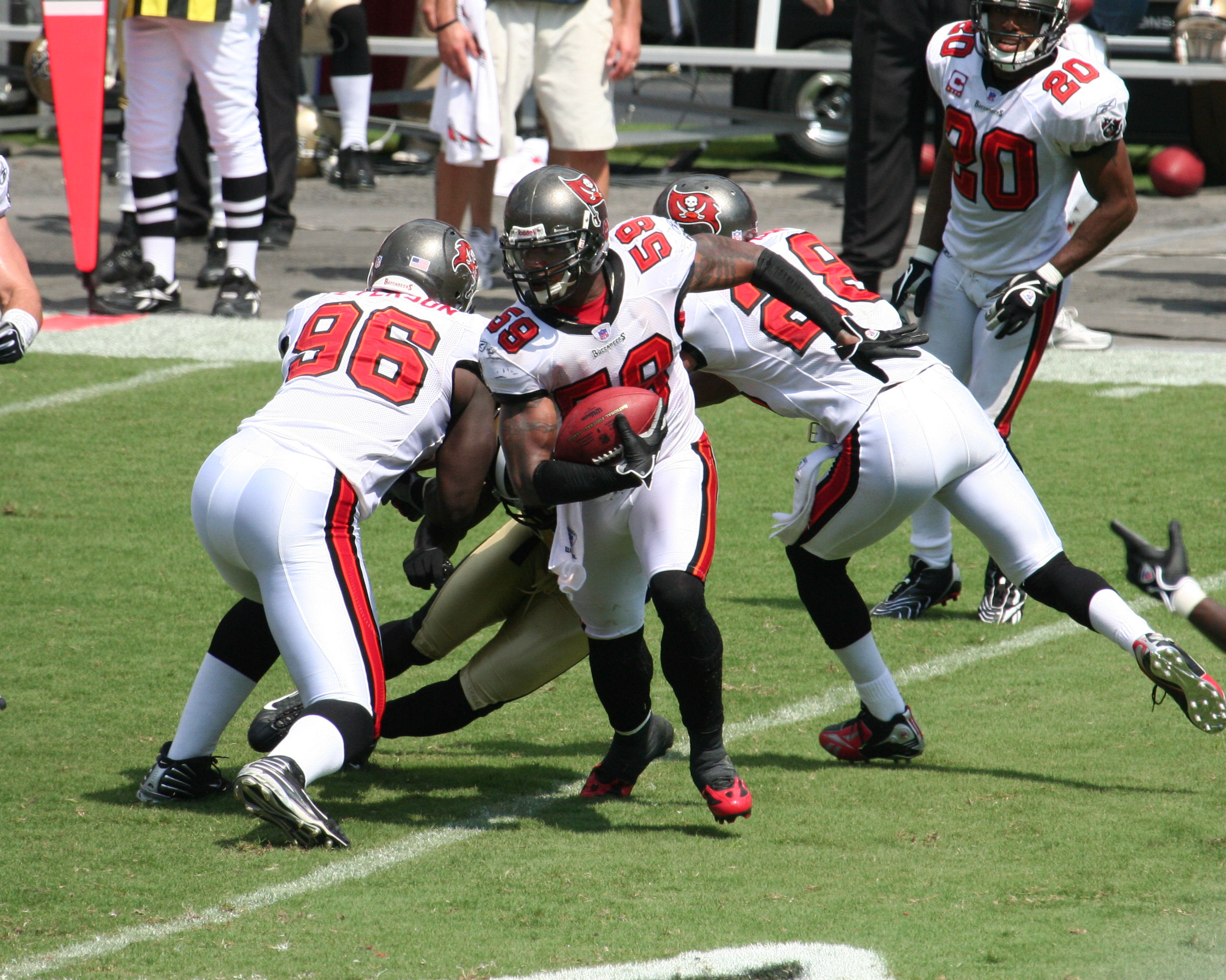
Cato June's first regular season interception for the Tampa Bay Buccaneers came on September 16, 2007.

- New York Giants OT Luke Petitgout, signed after being waived by his former team for medical reasons.
- Miami Dolphins UFA DE/DT Kevin Carter
- Indianapolis Colts UFA LB Cato June who was selected to the Pro Bowl two years ago
- New York Jets UFA FB B.J. Askew
- Denver Broncos UFA DE/LB Patrick Chukwurah who had 4.5 sacks last season off of the bench. He is reunited with his former defensive coordinator, the current Buccaneers defensive line coach, Larry Coyer.
- San Francisco 49ers UFA CB Sammy Davis, a former first round pick by the San Diego Chargers.
- San Francisco 49ers UFA DT Lance Legree, who has recorded 138 tackles and seven sacks in 76 games, including 25 starts. He was released on April 10.
- DT Kenny Smith, who was out of football last season, but spent four seasons with the New Orleans Saints and one year with the Oakland Raiders, totaling 69 tackles and 4½ sacks.
- New Orleans Saints UFA WR Levon Thomas who spent most of his time on the practice squad after being signed as an UFA by the Indianapolis Colts following the 2005 NFL draft.

Losses

- The key loss for the Buccaneers was standout DE and former second round pick, Dewayne White who left to sign with his former DL coach, the current head coach of the Detroit Lions, Rod Marinelli.
- Versatile Lineman Sean Mahan left to join the Pittsburgh Steelers to reunite with another former Tampa Bay coach, Mike Tomlin.
- The team released veteran linebacker Shelton Quarles after it was reported he failed a physical. Quarles had long been a productive player for Tampa, having spent his entire ten-year NFL career with the team.
- Following the draft, the Buccaneers released cornerback Juran Bolden, safety Tra Boger, long snapper Adam Johnson and defensive tackle Kenny Smith.

Re-signings After brief stays on the open market, the Buccaneers re-signed CBs Phillip Buchanon and Torrie Cox, the latter known as a special teams standout. They also re-signed fan favorite Mike Alstott to a one-year contract, but ultimately lost him to injured reserve after a neck injury during the preseason.

== Roster ==
Tampa Bay Buccaneers 2007 final roster
Quarterbacks: 7 Jeff Garcia; 5 Bruce Gradkowski; 12 Luke McCown; Running backs: 35 B. J. Askew FB; 29 Michael Bennett; 33 Kenneth Darby; 34 Earnest Graham; 32 Michael Pittman; 44 Byron Storer FB; Wide receivers: 18 Brian Clark; 80 Michael Clayton; 84 Joey Galloway; 19 Ike Hilliard; 15 Chad Lucas; 17 Micheal Spurlock; Tight ends: 88 Anthony Becht; 81 Alex Smith; 86 Jerramy Stevens	Offensive linemen: 72 Dan Buenning G; 69 Anthony Davis G/T; 75 Davin Joseph G; 68 Matt Lehr C/G; 70 Donald Penn T; 78 Arron Sears G; 65 Jeremy Trueblood T; 76 John Wade C; Defensive linemen: 90 Gaines Adams DE; 93 Kevin Carter DE; 71 Jovan Haye DT; 95 Chris Hovan DT; 96 Greg Peterson DT; 98 Ryan Sims DT; 94 Greg Spires DE; 91 Greg White DE	Linebackers: 58 Quincy Black OLB; 55 Derrick Brooks OLB; 54 Patrick Chukwurah OLB; 57 Adam Hayward OLB; 59 Cato June OLB; 56 Ryan Nece OLB; 51 Barrett Ruud MLB; 50 Jeremiah Trotter MLB; Defensive backs: 26 Will Allen FS; 20 Ronde Barber CB; 31 Phillip Buchanon CB/PR; 22 Sammy Davis CB; 28 Tanard Jackson FS; 25 Brian Kelly CB; 39 Kalvin Pearson SS; 23 Jermaine Phillips SS; Special teams: 9 Josh Bidwell P; 3 Matt Bryant K; 48 Andrew Economos LS	Reserve lists: 40 Mike Alstott FB (IR); 92 Charles Bennett DE (IR); 52 Antoine Cash LB (IR); 27 Torrie Cox CB (IR); 74 Chris Denman T (IR); 11 Mark Jones WR/KR/PR (IR); 43 Sam Olajubutu LB (IR); 77 Luke Petitgout T (IR); 21 Sabby Piscitelli S (IR); 2 Chris Simms QB (IR); 85 Maurice Stovall WR (IR); 82 Paris Warren WR (IR); 24 Cadillac Williams RB (IR); Practice squad: 10 Taye Biddle WR; 41 Darrell Hunter CB; 79 Marquise Gunn DE; 37 Marcus Hamilton CB; 87 Keith Heinrich TE; 64 Brian Johnson G; 14 Julius McClellan WR; 73 Dennis Roland T; rookies in italics 53 active, 13 inactive, 8 practice squad

== 2007 NFL draft ==
2007 Tampa Bay Buccaneers draft
Round	Pick	Player	Position	College	Notes
1	4	Gaines Adams	DE	Clemson	
2	35	Arron Sears	OG	Tennessee	
2	64	Sabby Piscitelli	S	Oregon State	from Indianapolis
3	68	Quincy Black	LB	New Mexico	
4	106	Tanard Jackson	S	Syracuse	from Minnesota
5	141	Greg Peterson	DE	North Carolina Central	
6	182	Adam Hayward	LB	Portland State	from Minnesota
7	214	Chris Denman	OT	Fresno State	
7	245	Marcus Hamilton	CB	Virginia	Compensatory selection
7	246	Kenneth Darby	RB	Alabama	Compensatory selection
Made roster † Pro Football Hall of Fame * Made at least one Pro Bowl during career

The 2007 NFL draft took place in Radio City Music Hall on April 28–29, 2007. The Buccaneers were either to pick third or fourth in the draft, to be determined by a coin flip with the Cleveland Browns because the two teams had identical records and strength of schedule. Buccaneers GM Bruce Allen called heads and the coin landed tails. For the first round, the Buccaneers picked fourth. The two teams alternated picking third and fourth in each round. In addition to their given picks, Tampa Bay also holds the Colts' second round pick, the 64th pick overall (because of a midseason trade for Anthony McFarland), but also lost a sixth round pick in a trade for tight end Doug Jolley formerly of the New York Jets. They also received two compensatory picks, awarded for losses during free agency. During the draft, the Buccaneers swapped fourth-rounders with the Minnesota Vikings in exchange for their pick in the sixth round.

== Preseason ==
The Tampa Bay Buccaneers held Training Camp at Disney's Wide World of Sports Complex from July 26 through August 16. They played four preseason games.

Week	Date	Opponent	Result	Record	Venue	Recap
1	August 10	New England Patriots	W 13–10	1–0	Raymond James Stadium	Recap
2	August 18	at Jacksonville Jaguars	L 31–19	1–1	Jacksonville Municipal Stadium	Recap
3	August 18	at Miami Dolphins	W 31–28	2–1	Dolphin Stadium	Recap
4	August 30	Houston Texans	W 31–24	3–1	Raymond James Stadium	Recap

Notes

- On August 9, 2007, fullback Mike Alstott was placed on injured reserve due to a neck injury, ending his 2007 season.
- On August 30, 2007, with three minutes left in preseason, during the final touchdown against the Texans, wide receiver Paris Warren suffered a severe injury to his leg, and he was placed on injured reserve.
- Prior to the beginning of the regular season, the Buccaneers made their final cuts. Among others, notable players included DT Ellis Wyms, a starter last season, and CB Alan Zemaitis a 2005 Fourth Round Draft pick.

== Schedule ==
Week	Date	Opponent	Result	Record	Venue	Recap
1	September 9	at Seattle Seahawks	L 6–20	0–1	Qwest Field	Recap
2	September 16	New Orleans Saints	W 31–14	1–1	Raymond James Stadium	Recap
3	September 23	St. Louis Rams	W 24–3	2–1	Raymond James Stadium	Recap
4	September 30	at Carolina Panthers	W 20–7	3–1	Bank of America Stadium	Recap
5	October 7	at Indianapolis Colts	L 14–33	3–2	RCA Dome	Recap
6	October 14	Tennessee Titans	W 13–10	4–2	Raymond James Stadium	Recap
7	October 21	at Detroit Lions	L 16–23	4–3	Ford Field	Recap
8	October 28	Jacksonville Jaguars	L 23–24	4–4	Raymond James Stadium	Recap
9	November 4	Arizona Cardinals	W 17–10	5–4	Raymond James Stadium	Recap
10	Bye					
11	November 18	at Atlanta Falcons	W 31–7	6–4	Georgia Dome	Recap
12	November 25	Washington Redskins	W 19–13	7–4	Raymond James Stadium	Recap
13	December 2	at New Orleans Saints	W 27–23	8–4	Louisiana Superdome	Recap
14	December 9	at Houston Texans	L 14–28	8–5	Reliant Stadium	Recap
15	December 16	Atlanta Falcons	W 37–3	9–5	Raymond James Stadium	Recap
16	December 23	at San Francisco 49ers	L 19–21	9–6	Monster Park	Recap
17	December 30	Carolina Panthers	L 23–31	9–7	Raymond James Stadium	Recap

== Standings ==
NFC South
	W	L	T	PCT	DIV	CONF	PF	PA	STK
^{(4)} Tampa Bay Buccaneers	9	7	0	.563	5–1	8–4	334	270	L2
Carolina Panthers	7	9	0	.438	3–3	7–5	267	347	W1
New Orleans Saints	7	9	0	.438	3–3	6–6	379	388	L2
Atlanta Falcons	4	12	0	.250	1–5	3–9	259	414	W1

== Regular season game summaries ==
=== Week 1: at Seattle Seahawks ===
Quarter	1	2	3	4	Total
Buccaneers	6	0	0	0	6
Seahawks	0	10	0	10	20

at Qwest Field – Seattle

- Date: Sunday, September 9, 2007
- Game time: 4:15 p.m. EDT/1:15 p.m. PDT
- Game weather: 67 °F (19.4 °C)
- Game attendance: 68,044
- TV announcers (Fox): Dick Stockton, Brian Baldinger, and Cara Capuano (sideline reporter)

Game information

First quarter

- TB – Matt Bryant 38-yard field goal, 8:56. Buccaneers 3–0. Drive: 6 plays, 55 yards, 3:35.
- TB – Matt Bryant 32-yard field goal, 0:00. Buccaneers 6–0. Drive: 10 plays, 76 yards, 5:56.

Second quarter

- SEA – Josh Brown 28-yard field goal, 2:39. Buccaneers 6–3. Drive: 11 plays, 69 yards, 4:03.
- SEA – Shaun Alexander 1-yard run (Josh Brown kick), 0:50. Seahawks 10–6. Drive: 3 plays, 15 yards, 0:45.

Third quarter

- No scoring plays

Fourth quarter

- SEA – Josh Brown 46-yard field goal, 14:09. Seahawks 13–6. Drive: 9 plays, 54 yards, 4:21.
- SEA – Maurice Morris 34-yard pass from Matt Hasselbeck (Josh Brown kick), 7:55. Seahawks 20–6. Drive: 7 plays, 67 yards, 4:13.

Top passers

- TB – Jeff Garcia – 19/27, 201 yards
- SEA – Matt Hasselbeck – 17/24, 222 yards, TD

Top rushers

- TB – Cadillac Williams – 12 rushes, 60 yards
- SEA – Shaun Alexander – 27 rushes, 105 yards, TD

Top receivers

- TB – Joey Galloway – 5 receptions, 72 yards
- SEA – Bobby Engram – 3 receptions, 64 yards

The Buccaneers began their 2007 campaign on the road against their fellow 1976 expansion mate, the Seattle Seahawks. In the first quarter, kicker Matt Bryant provided two field goals for Tampa Bay (a 38-yarder and a 32-yarder) to begin the game. In the second quarter, the Seahawks took the lead with kicker Josh Brown's 28-yard field goal, while RB Shaun Alexander got a 1-yard TD run. During a scoreless third quarter, injuries sidelined Tampa Bay running back Cadillac Williams (ribs) and quarterback Jeff Garcia (head). Garcia, however, returned to the game. Seattle wrapped up the win with Brown's 46-yard field goal, while QB Matt Hasselbeck completed a 34-yard TD pass to RB Maurice Morris.

With the loss, the Buccaneers began their season at 0–1, their third opening day defeat in the past four seasons.

=== Week 2: vs New Orleans Saints ===
Quarter	1	2	3	4	Total
Saints	0	0	7	7	14
Buccaneers	7	14	7	3	31

at Raymond James Stadium – Tampa, Florida

- Date: Sunday September 16, 2007
- Game weather: Partly cloudy, hot, 91 °F (32.8 °C)
- Game attendance: 65,178
- TV announcers (Fox): Sam Rosen, Tim Ryan & Chris Myers (sideline reporter)

Game information

First quarter

- TB – Cadillac Williams 1-yard run (Matt Bryant kick), 5:25. Buccaneers 7–0. Drive: 8 plays, 57 yards, 4:36.

Second quarter

- TB – Joey Galloway 69-yard pass from Jeff Garcia (Matt Bryant kick), 13:09. Buccaneers 14–0. Drive: 3 plays, 68 yards, 1:37.
- TB – Joey Galloway 24-yard pass from Jeff Garcia (Matt Bryant kick), 1:05. Buccaneers 21–0. Drive: 2 plays, 65 yards, 0:36.

Third quarter

- TB – Cadillac Williams 1-yard run (Matt Bryant kick), 4:26. Buccaneers 28–0. Drive: 5 plays, 53 yards, 2:39.
- NO – Mike Karney 1-yard run (Olindo Mare kick), 0:49. Buccaneers 28–7. Drive: 9 plays, 80 yards, 3:37.

Fourth quarter

- TB – Matt Bryant 27-yard field goal, 7:30. Buccaneers 31–7. Drive: 8 plays, 25 yards, 4:11.
- NO – Marques Colston 4-yard pass from Drew Brees (Olindo Mare kick), 2:50. Buccaneers 31–14. Drive: 11 play, 78 yards, 4:40.

Top passers

- NO – Drew Brees – 26/44, 260 yards, TD, INT
- TB – Jeff Garcia – 10/16, 243 yards, 2 TD

Top rushers

- NO – Deuce McAllister – 10 rushes, 49 yards
- TB – Cadillac Williams – 24 rushes, 61 yards, 2 TD

Top receivers

- NO – Marques Colston – 8 receptions, 70 yards, TD
- TB – Joey Galloway – 4 receptions, 135 yards, 2 TD

The Buccaneers played their home opener against the 2006 NFC South champion New Orleans Saints. After scoring only 6 points the week before, the Buccaneers dominated the Saints, on offense and defense, at one point taking a 28–0 lead. Early in the first quarter, Barrett Ruud recovered a Deuce McAllister fumble, which set up a Tampa Bay scoring drive. Carnell Williams, who was back in the lineup after injuring his ribs the week before, capped off the drive with a one-yard touchdown run. Early in the second quarter, Joey Galloway scored on a 69-yard catch and run from quarterback Jeff Garcia. Inside the two-minute warning, Garcia and Galloway scored again, this time with a 24-yard touchdown, to take a 21–0 halftime lead. Halfway through the third quarter, Cato June intercepted a pass from Drew Brees. Two plays later, Garcia and Galloway connected for yet another big play, a 41-yard completion to the New Orleans 9-yard line. Williams capped off the drive with his second 1-yard touchdown. New Orleans' first score came with a 1-yard touchdown run by Mike Karney, aided by a 58-yard catch by Phillip Buchanon moments earlier. The Buccaneers improved to 1–1, into a tie for the NFC South lead. New Orleans fell to 0–2.

Following the game, with 16 tackles, and 2 forced fumbles, middle linebacker Barrett Ruud was named the NFC Defensive Player of the Week on Wednesday September 19.

=== Week 3: vs St. Louis Rams ===
Quarter	1	2	3	4	Total
Rams	0	0	0	3	3
Buccaneers	0	3	7	14	24

at Raymond James Stadium – Tampa, Florida

- Date: Sunday September 23, 2007
- Game time: 1:00 p.m. EDT
- Game weather: Thunderstorms, hot, 89 °F (31.7 °C)
- Game attendance: 65,267
- TV announcers (Fox): Sam Rosen, Tim Ryan & Chris Myers (sideline reporter)

Game information

First quarter

- No scoring plays

Second quarter

- TB – Matt Bryant 27-yard field goal, 0:03. Buccaneers 3–0. Drive: 12 plays, 32 yards, 1:57.

Third quarter

- TB – Cadillac Williams 7-yard run (Matt Bryant kick), 10:41. Buccaneers 10–0. Drive: 7 plays, 53 yards, 4:19.

Fourth quarter

- STL – Jeff Wilkins 25-yard field goal, 11:31. Buccaneers 10–3. Drive: 7 plays, 26 yards, 3:20.
- TB – Earnest Graham 8-yard run (Matt Bryant kick), 7:56. Buccaneers 17–3. Drive: 6 plays, 80 yards, 3:35.
- TB – Earnest Graham 28-yard run (Matt Bryant kick), 5:00. Buccaneers 24–3. Drive: 3 plays, 40 yards, 1:36.

Top passers

- STL – Marc Bulger – 17/26, 116 yards, 3 INT
- TB – Jeff Garcia – 14/22, 151 yards

Top rushers

- STL – Steven Jackson – 30 rushes, 115 yards
- TB – Earnest Graham – 8 rushes, 75 yards, 2 TD

Top receivers

- STL – Torry Holt – 5 receptions, 63 yards
- TB – Joey Galloway – 4 receptions, 42 yards

The Buccaneers and St. Louis Rams renewed a rivalry that was popular from 1999–2004. The early part of the game was a field position battle, with Rams running back Steven Jackson rushing effectively in the first half. All of St. Louis' first half drives, however, came up empty on the scoreboard. Tampa Bay's first quarter drivers were also scoreless, with kicker Matt Bryant missing a 54-yard field goal short after slipping in the damp grass. Just before the two-minute warning, Rams kicker Jeff Wilkins missed a 42-yard field goal, setting up Tampa Bay's first score. After driving to the 17-yard line, a heavy downpour drenched the stadium. Matt Bryant connected on 27-yard field goal for the game's first points and concluded the first half. Tampa Bay received the second half kickoff, and rolled into the endzone with a 7-yard touchdown run by Carnell Williams. St. Louis drove to the Tampa Bay 10-yard line, aided by two uncharacteristic defensive penalties by Derrick Brooks (late hit) and Ronde Barber (taunting). The threat was moot, however, as Phillip Buchanon intercepted Marc Bulger in the endzone. In the fourth quarter, Carnell Williams, aggravated his sore ribs, and fumbled the ball while Oshiomogho Atogwe recovered for St. Louis. The Rams finally got on the scoreboard with a 25-yard field goal, narrowing the lead to 10–3 with 12 minutes to play. Back up running back Earnest Graham took over for Williams, and iced the game with two rushing touchdowns, the first of his career outside of the preseason.

=== Week 4: at Carolina Panthers ===
Quarter	1	2	3	4	Total
Buccaneers	14	3	0	3	20
Panthers	0	0	0	7	7

at Bank of America Stadium – Charlotte, North Carolina

- Date: Sunday September 30, 2007
- Game time: 4:05 p.m. EDT
- Game weather: Sunny, 81 °F (27.2 °C)
- Game attendance: 73,707
- TV announcers (Fox): Sam Rosen, Tim Ryan, and Chris Myers (sideline reporter)

Game information

First quarter

- TB – Jeff Garcia 3-yard run (Matt Bryant kick), 8:43. Buccaneers 7–0. Drive: 11 plays, 72 yards, 6:17.
- TB – Earnest Graham 1-yard run (Matt Bryant kick), 0:48. Buccaneers 14–0. Drive: 5 plays, 47 yards, 2:25.

Second quarter

- TB – Matt Bryant 25-yard field goal, 6:41. Buccaneers 17–0. Drive: 6 plays, 59 yards, 2:30.

Third quarter

- No scoring plays

Fourth quarter

- TB – Matt Bryant 38-yard field goal, 10:21. Buccaneers 20–0. Drive: 4 plays, 8 yards, 1:29.
- CAR – DeAngelo Williams 24-yard pass from David Carr (John Kasay kick), 0:23. Buccaneers 20–7. Drive: 12 plays, 60 yards, 2:32.

Top passers

- TB – Jeff Garcia – 15/25, 176 yards
- CAR – David Carr – 19/41, 155 yards, TD, INT

Top rushers

- TB – Michael Pittman – 15 rushes, 90 yards
- CAR – DeShaun Foster – 15 rushes, 64 yards

Top receivers

- TB – Ike Hilliard – 7 receptions, 114 yards
- CAR – DeAngelo Williams – 3 receptions, 37 yards, TD

The Buccaneers and Panthers met for the first time this season, with first place in the NFC South on the line. Carolina starting quarterback Jake Delhomme sat out the game with an elbow injury, and was replaced by David Carr. The Buccaneer offense started the game with an exhausting, 11-play, 71-yard drive, capped off by a 3-yard scramble by Jeff Garcia for a touchdown. With 3 minutes left in the first quarter, running back Carnell Williams blasted down the field for an 18-yard run, but his right leg buckled, seriously injuring his knee. As he was being carted off the field, nearly the entire Buccaneers team, along with several Panthers players, huddled around Williams in support. After the injury timeout, Earnest Graham salvaged the drive with a one-yard touchdown run. Tampa Bay extended their halftime lead to 17–0 after a Matt Bryant field goal, meanwhile, Carolina's offense was sputtering, blasted by the Buccaneers defense, who sacked Carr three times, and intercepted him once. Carr completed only 19 of 41 pass attempts, and Carolina was facing their first shutout in five seasons. With 23 seconds left in regulation, Carolina finally got on the board with a touchdown pass to DeAngelo Williams. An onside kick was unsuccessful, and the Buccaneers won their third straight game.

Through four games, the Buccaneers had not given up any points in the first quarter, and quarterback Jeff Garcia had not thrown an interception. After the game, the Buccaneers announced that running back Carnell Williams (torn patellar ligament) and left tackle Luke Petitgout (torn ACL) would both face season-ending surgery. On Wednesday, October 3, linebacker Barrett Ruud was named the NFC Defensive Player of Month for September with a league-leading 51 tackles, three forced fumbles, two fumble recoveries, and one interception.

=== Week 5: at Indianapolis Colts ===
Quarter	1	2	3	4	Total
Buccaneers	0	7	0	7	14
Colts	7	9	7	10	33

at RCA Dome – Indianapolis, Indiana

- Date: Sunday October 7, 2007
- Game time: 4:05 p.m. EDT
- Game weather: Indoors
- Game attendance: 65,743
- TV announcers (Fox): Kenny Albert, Daryl Johnston, Tony Siragusa

Game information

First quarter

- IND – Dallas Clark 10-yard pass from Peyton Manning (Adam Vinatieri kick), 10:19. Colts 7–0. Drive: 7 plays, 42 yards, 2:49.

Second quarter

- IND – Kenton Keith 1-yard run (kick blocked), 14:53. Colts 13–0. Drive: 15 plays, 74 yards, 8:09.
- TB – Alex Smith 3-yard pass from Jeff Garcia (Matt Bryant kick), 6:43. Colts 13–7. Drive: 9 plays, 56 yards, 5:32.
- IND – Adam Vinatieri 27-yard field goal, 0:00. Colts 16–7. Drive: 12 plays, 67 yards, 2:01.

Third quarter

- IND – Kenton Keith 7-yard run (Adam Vinatieri kick), 7:23. Colts 23–7. Drive: 13 plays, 77 yards, 7:37.

Fourth quarter

- IND – Reggie Wayne 9-yard pass from Peyton Manning (Adam Vinatieri kick), 14:57. Colts 30–7. Drive: 11 plays, 68 yards, 5:45.
- TB – Alex Smith 3-yard pass from Jeff Garcia (Matt Bryant kick), 9:21. Colts 30–14. Drive: 12 plays, 81 yards, 5:36.
- IND – Adam Vinatieri 35-yard field goal, 2:53. Colts 33–14. Drive: 11 plays, 67 yards, 6:28.

Top passers

- TB – Jeff Garcia – 18/23, 143 yards, 2 TD
- IND – Peyton Manning – 29/37, 253 yards, 2 TD, INT

Top rushers

- TB – Earnest Graham – 6 rushes, 11 yards
- IND – Kenton Keith – 28 rushes, 121 yards, 2 TD

Top receivers

- TB – Ike Hilliard – 8 receptions, 58 yards
- IND – Anthony Gonzalez – 7 receptions, 71 yards

The Buccaneers faced former head coach Tony Dungy for the second time. The previous meeting between the two teams in 2003 saw the Colts erase a 21-point deficit in the final four minutes to win the game in overtime. Both teams entered the game with players sidelined by injuries. Marvin Harrison and Joseph Addai sat out for Indianapolis, while Carnell Williams and Luke Petitgout were placed on injured reserve for Tampa Bay.

The Colts controlled the tempo of most of the game, with a time of possession of over 38 minutes and 400 yards of offense. The Buccaneers were held to only 177 total yards and only 17 yards rushing. The first three Buccaneers possessions were three-and-outs. Meanwhile, Indianapolis pulled out to a 13–0 lead. In the second quarter, Tanard Jackson intercepted Peyton Manning and set up the Buccaneers' first scoring drive. During the drive, running back Michael Pittman left the game with an injured ankle. Two plays later Tampa Bay got on the board with a Jeff Garcia touchdown pass to Alex Smith, and narrowed the score to 13–7.

In the second half, Indianapolis continued to dominate both sides of the ball, and stretched their lead to 30–7. Garcia and Smith connected for a second touchdown pass with just over 9 minutes left in the fourth quarter, and made the score 30–14. Hoping to spark a comeback, Tampa Bay attempted a surprise onside kick, but it was called back by a penalty. Indianapolis then took the re-kick, and put three more points on the board with an Adam Vinatieri field goal. Bruce Gradkowski took over as quarterback for Tampa Bay, and subsequently threw an interception to seal the victory for the Colts.

The following day, on Monday, October 8, the Buccaneers announced that Michael Pittman would miss 6–8 weeks with a cracked fibula.

=== Week 6: vs Tennessee Titans ===
Quarter	1	2	3	4	Total
Titans	0	0	3	7	10
Buccaneers	0	3	7	3	13

at Raymond James Stadium – Tampa, Florida

- Date: Sunday October 14, 2007
- Game time: 1:00 p.m. EDT/12:00 p.m. CDT
- Game weather: Partly cloudy, 84 °F (28.9 °C)
- Game attendance: 65,347
- TV announcers (CBS): Greg Gumbel and Dan Dierdorf

Game information

First quarter

- No scoring plays

Second quarter

- TB – Matt Bryant 23-yard field goal, 6:07. Buccaneers 3–0. Drive: 8 plays, 49 yards, 4:19.

Third quarter

- TEN – Rob Bironas 48-yard field goal, 7:52. Tied 3–3. Drive: 12 plays, 45 yards, 7:08.
- TB – Joey Galloway 69-yard pass from Jeff Garcia (Matt Bryant kick), 2:29. Buccaneers 10–3. Drive: 3 plays, 80 yards, 1:30.

Fourth quarter

- TEN – LenDale White 2-yard run (Rob Bironas kick), 1:17. Tied 10–10. Drive: 13 plays, 85 yards, 6:17.
- TB – Matt Bryant 43-yard field goal, 0:11. Buccaneers 13–10. Drive: 7 plays, 55 yards, 1:06.

Top passers

- TEN – Kerry Collins – 10/20, 125 yards
- TB – Jeff Garcia – 20/31, 274 yards, TD

Top rushers

- TEN – LenDale White – 25 rushes, 64 yards, TD
- TB – Earnest Graham – 13 rushes, 29 yards

Top receivers

- TEN – Justin Gage – 4 receptions, 82 yards
- TB – Joey Galloway – 4 receptions, 97 yards, TD

The Buccaneers hosted the Titans at Raymond James Stadium, their second inter-conference matchup in two weeks. Buccaneers running back Earnest Graham was a part of the starting lineup for the first time in his career, replacing the injured Michael Pittman, who sat out the game.

The first half was a defensive struggle, with neither team scoring in the first quarter. Early in the second quarter, Tennessee drove to the Buccaneers 32-yard line, but quarterback Vince Young fumbled the ball and the Buccaneers recovered. Jeff Garcia connected on a 39-yard pass play to Michael Clayton, to help set up a 23-yard Matt Bryant field goal, the first points of the game. Moments later, Phillip Buchanon intercepted Vince Young with 1:29 remaining in the half, to maintain a 3–0 halftime lead.

Tennessee took the second half kickoff, and executed a 12-play, 45-yard drive which resulted in a 48-yard field goal by Rob Bironas. On their next possession, Vince Young ran out of bounds, and suffered a strained quad. He would have to leave the game, and was replaced by Kerry Collins. On Tampa Bay's next drive, Garcia connected with Joey Galloway for a 69-yard touchdown catch. On the ensuing drive Ronde Barber intercepted a pass by Kerry Collins, but it ruled incomplete after review.

With less than four minutes remaining in regulation, Collins drove the Titans to the Buccaneers 23-yard line. For the second time, Ronde Barber intercepted Collins, this time in the endzone, but it was again ruled incomplete after review. The drive continued, and with 1:24 remaining, LenDale White tied the game 10–10 with a touchdown run. With only one timeout, Garcia drove the Buccaneers 55 yards on seven plays. With 11 seconds remaining, Matt Bryant kicked a game-winning 43-yard field goal.

This is the only time the Buccaneers have beaten the Titans since they moved from Houston, and one of only two Buccaneer victories against the Oilers/Titans franchise, the other occurring in 1983.

=== Week 7: at Detroit Lions ===
Quarter	1	2	3	4	Total
Buccaneers	0	7	0	9	16
Lions	10	3	3	7	23

at Ford Field – Detroit

- Date: Sunday October 21, 2007
- Game time: 1:00 p.m. EDT
- Game weather: Indoors
- Game attendance: 71,234
- TV announcers (Fox): Ron Pitts, Tony Boselli, and Jennifer Hammond (sideline reporter)

Game information

First quarter

- DET – Jason Hanson 34-yard field goal, 9:53. Lions 3–0. Drive: 6 plays, 37 yards, 2:32.
- DET – Kevin Jones 1-yard run (Jason Hanson kick), 2:51. Lions 10–0. Drive: 5 plays, 49 yards, 2:01.

Second quarter

- TB – Ike Hilliard 5-yard pass from Jeff Garcia (Matt Bryant kick), 12:48. Lions 10–7. Drive: 9 plays, 81 yards, 5:03.
- DET – Jason Hanson 42-yard field goal, 0:05. Lions 13–7. Drive: 9 plays, 46 yards, 1:55.

Third quarter

- DET – Jason Hanson 32-yard field goal, 4:13. Lions 16–7. Drive: 13 plays, 66 yards, 8:17.

Fourth quarter

- DET – Calvin Johnson 32-yard run (Jason Hanson kick), 6:28. Lions 23–7. Drive: 9 plays, 92 yards, 5:20.
- TB – Maurice Stovall 4-yard pass from Jeff Garcia (pass failed), 2:03. Lions 23–13. Drive: 16 plays, 69 yards, 4:25.
- TB – Matt Bryant 48-yard field goal, 1:04. Lions 23–16. Drive: 6 plays, 30 yards, 0:59.

Top passers

- TB – Jeff Garcia – 37/45, 316 yards, 2 TD
- DET – Jon Kitna – 16/20, 147 yards

Top rushers

- TB – Earnest Graham – 19 rushes, 92 yards
- DET – Kevin Jones – 15 rushes, 76 yards, TD

Top receivers

- TB – Earnest Graham – 13 receptions, 99 yards
- DET – Calvin Johnson – 2 receptions, 37 yards

Tampa Bay racked up 422 yards of offense against Detroit, and quarterback Jeff Garcia passed for 316 yards, but two costly fumbles and one blocked punt allowed the Lions to take the victory.

In the first quarter, Tampa Bay and Detroit began what would be a physical game. Tampa Bay suffered injuries to Mark Jones (knee) and Michael Clayton (ankle), and neither returned. On the sixth play of the game, Detroit forced a fumble for a loss of 23 yards. However, an instant replay ruled the play an incomplete pass instead. Moments later, the Lions blocked a punt by Josh Bidwell, and the turnover led to a field goal. On the next drive, the Buccaneers drove 43 yards to the Lions 37-yard line, but a fumble between the exchange from Garcia to Earnest Graham was recovered by the Lions. Detroit moved quickly down the field and Kevin Jones scored the first touchdown of the game.

Early in the second quarter, Garcia capped off an 81-yard drive with a touchdown pass to Ike Hilliard. Their next possession, a 16-play, 58-yard drive, covered over 9 minutes. It came up empty, as Matt Bryant missed a field goal. Detroit moved quickly to score a field goal just before halftime.

Late in the third quarter, and early in the fourth quarter, Tampa Bay started another long drive. A 15-play, 73-yard drive of over 7 minutes took the Buccaneers to the Detroit 1-yard line. Tampa Bay had converted on two third downs, and one fourth down. But Garcia fumbled the handoff on a first and goal at the 1-yard line, and Detroit recovered. They drove 93 yards for their second touchdown.

Trailing by 16, Tampa Bay drove 78 yards in 16 plays, and Maurice Stovall caught Garcia's second touchdown pass. A two-point conversion failed, but Bryant performed an onside kick, which Tampa Bay recovered. The Buccaneers trimmed the deficit to 7, but a second onside kick failed, and Detroit took the victory.

=== Week 8: vs Jacksonville Jaguars ===
Quarter	1	2	3	4	Total
Jaguars	7	10	0	7	24
Buccaneers	3	10	10	0	23

at Raymond James Stadium – Tampa, Florida

- Date: Sunday October 28, 2007
- Game time: 4:05 p.m. EDT
- Game weather: Cloudy, 80 °F (26.7 °C)
- Game attendance: 65,133
- TV announcers (CBS): Ian Eagle and Solomon Wilcots

Game information

First quarter

- TB – Matt Bryant 44-yard field goal, 7:26. Buccaneers 3–0. Drive: 8 plays, 34 yards, 3:45.
- JAX – LaBrandon Toefield 1-yard run (John Carney kick), 1:31. Jaguars 7–3. Drive: 10 plays, 50 yards, 5:55.

Second quarter

- JAX – John Carney 41-yard field goal, 7:25. Jaguars 10–3. Drive: 5 plays, 34 yards, 2:11.
- JAX – Aaron Glenn 28-yard interception return (John Carney kick), 7:09. Jaguars 17–3.
- TB – Joey Galloway 58-yard pass from Jeff Garcia (Matt Bryant kick), 5:45. Jaguars 17–10. Drive: 3 plays, 81 yards, 1:24.
- TB – Matt Bryant 22-yard field goal, 0:15. Jaguars 17–13. Drive: 10 plays, 57 yards, 1:46.

Third quarter

- TB – Michael Bennett 19-yard run (Matt Bryant kick), 3:19. Buccaneers 20–17. Drive: 3 plays, 67 yards, 1:24.
- TB – Matt Bryant 42-yard field goal, 0:05. Buccaneers 23–17. Drive: 4 plays, 6 yards, 1:34.

Fourth quarter

- JAX – Matt Jones 8-yard pass from Quinn Gray (John Carney kick), 11:37. Jaguars 24–23. Drive: 8 plays, 53 yards, 3:28.

Top passers

- JAX – Quinn Gray – 7/16, 100 yards, TD
- TB – Jeff Garcia – 19/41, 267 yards, TD, 3 INT

Top rushers

- JAX – Fred Taylor – 24 rushes, 68 yards
- TB – Earnest Graham – 14 rushes, 62 yards

Top receivers

- JAX – Greg Estandia – 1 reception, 30 yards
- TB – Joey Galloway – 6 receptions, 115 yards, TD

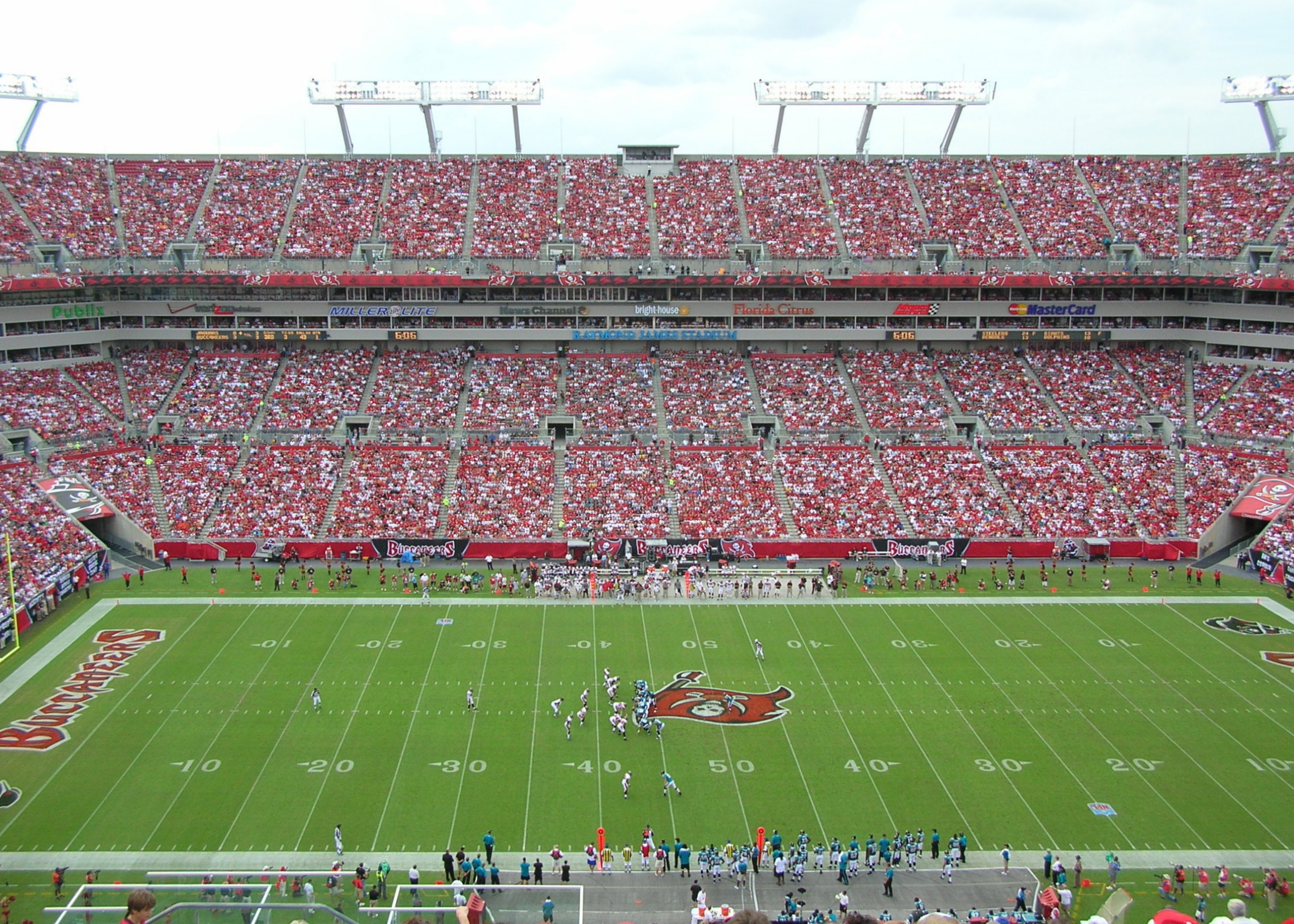
Against the Jaguars

Tampa Bay faced in-state rival Jacksonville Jaguars for the fourth time in the regular season. Injured Jacksonville starting quarterback David Garrard was replaced by Quinn Gray, while Jeff Garcia hoped to extend on a 217-consecutive passing streak without an interception.

In the first half, Jacksonville's running attack of Fred Taylor, LaBrandon Toefield and Maurice Jones-Drew rushed 15 times in their first 16 plays from scrimmage, and eventually set up a 10–3 lead. In the second quarter, Garcia threw his first interception of the season, which was returned for a Jacksonville score. Tampa Bay quickly responded, however, driving 81 yards in three plays, capped off with Garcia and Joey Galloway connecting for a 58-yard touchdown.

A momentum shift appeared to occur near the end of the second quarter, as Tampa Bay forced Jacksonville into a 3-and-out. Inside the two-minute warning, Garcia drove the Buccaneers to the 4-yard line. Garcia scrambled on 3rd & 10, colliding with Reggie Nelson, losing his helmet, but fell one yard short of the first down. Tampa Bay settled for a Matt Bryant field goal, and a 13–17 halftime deficit.

Tampa Bay's defense dominated the third quarter, forcing Jacksonville a turnover on downs, a fumble in the end zone (recovered by Gray on 1-yard line), and a blocked punt. The good field position led to Michael Bennett's first touchdown as a Buccaneer.

The fourth quarter saw Jacksonville re-take the lead with an 8-yard touchdown pass. Despite two late drives starting with decent field position, Tampa Bay's effort died when Garcia's pass was deflected and intercepted with 19 seconds remaining, his third pick of the game. The loss dropped Tampa Bay to 4–4, second place in the NFC South.

=== Week 9: vs Arizona Cardinals ===
Quarter	1	2	3	4	Total
Cardinals	3	0	0	7	10
Buccaneers	7	3	7	0	17

at Raymond James Stadium – Tampa, Florida

- Date: Sunday November 4, 2007
- Game time: 1:00 p.m. EDT
- Game weather: Sunny, 75 °F (23.9 °C)
- Game attendance: 65,267
- TV announcers (Fox): Ron Pitts, Tony Boselli, Chip Carter (sideline reporter)

Game information

First quarter

- ARI – Neil Rackers 47-yard field goal, 12:17. Cardinals 3–0. Drive: 6 plays, 59 yards, 2:43.
- TB – Joey Galloway 37-yard pass from Jeff Garcia (Matt Bryant kick), 5:56. Buccaneers 7–3. Drive: 10 plays, 77 yards, 6:21.

Second quarter

- TB – Matt Bryant 32-yard field goal, 13:37. Buccaneers 10–3. Drive: 4 plays, 3 yards, 1:12.

Third quarter

- TB – Earnest Graham 2-yard run (Matt Bryant kick), 10:33. Buccaneers 17–3. Drive: 10 plays, 56 yards, 4:27.

Fourth quarter

- ARI – Edgerrin James 3-yard run (Neil Rackers kick), 7:30. Buccaneers 17–10. Drive: 11 plays, 76 yards, 4:17.

Top passers

- ARI – Kurt Warner – 10/30, 172 yards, 2 INT
- TB – Jeff Garcia – 18/28, 196 yards, TD

Top rushers

- ARI – Edgerrin James – 9 rushes, 15 yards, TD
- TB – Earnest Graham – 34 rushes, 124 yards, TD

Top receivers

- ARI – Larry Fitzgerald – 4 receptions, 95 yards
- TB – Joey Galloway – 5 receptions, 84 yards, TD

The Buccaneers beat the visiting Arizona Cardinals, snapping a two-game losing streak, and regained first place in the NFC South. Tampa Bay dominated the game, maintaining a time of possession of over 43 minutes with running back Earnest Graham rushing for 124 yards and one touchdown. Tampa Bay's defense held Arizona to only 23 yards rushing, and held them to 2 of 10 third down conversions.

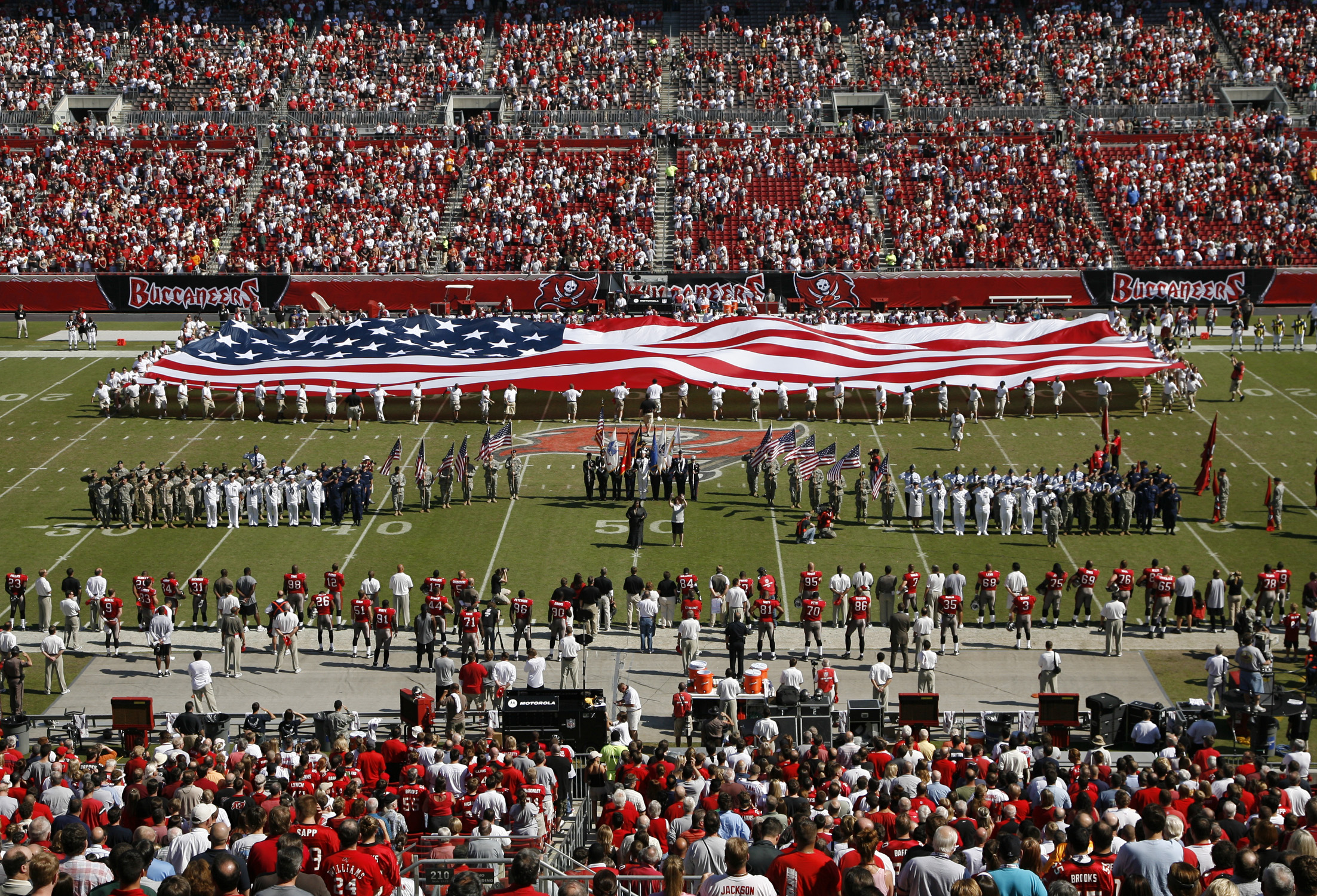
An American flag is unfurled on the field before the Bucs-Cardinals game

In the first quarter, Arizona quickly drove down the field, connecting on a 47-yard pass from Kurt Warner to Larry Fitzgerald. The drive stalled, however, and they settled for 43-yard Neil Rackers field goal. Tampa Bay answered on the ensuing drive. On 3rd and 1, from the 42-yard line, Jeff Garcia fell, but avoided a sack, and scrambled for a first down. Two plays later he scored a 37-yard touchdown pass to Joey Galloway.

On the first play of the second quarter, Tanard Jackson intercepted Warner's pass, and Arizona was penalized 15 yards for a facemask, setting up the Buccaneers on the Arizona 27-yard line. Tampa Bay suffered two false start penalties, and settled for a field goal and took a 10–3 lead into halftime.

Tampa Bay took the second half kickoff and drove 64 yards in ten plays. The drive was capped off by a 2-yard touchdown run by Earnest Graham. Late in the third quarter, the Buccaneers started a 19-play, 86-yard drive, lasting nearly 9 minutes. At the 8-yard line, Garcia threw to Alex Smith but the pass was incomplete in the endzone. The drive came up empty when Matt Bryant missed a 26-yard field goal. Arizona quickly drove down the field and scored a touchdown by Edgerrin James, narrowing the margin to 17–10.

With 2:43 remaining in the game, Tampa Bay punted to Arizona. Maurice Stovall de-cleated receiver Steve Breaston at the Arizona 16-yard line, preventing a return. On the very next play, Jermaine Phillips intercepted Warner's pass, sealing the victory for Tampa Bay.

=== Week 10: Bye week ===
The Buccaneers had their scheduled bye the weekend of November 11. In week 10 action, Atlanta defeated Carolina, and St. Louis upset New Orleans, giving Tampa Bay sole possession of first place in the NFC South.

=== Week 11: at Atlanta Falcons ===
Quarter	1	2	3	4	Total
Buccaneers	7	7	10	7	31
Falcons	0	0	0	7	7

at Georgia Dome – Atlanta

- Date: Sunday November 18, 2007
- Game time: 1:00 p.m. EST
- Game weather: Indoors
- Game attendance: 69,480
- TV announcers (Fox): Ron Pitts (play-by-play) & Tony Boselli (color commentator)

Game information

First quarter

- TB – Joey Galloway 44-yard pass from Jeff Garcia (Matt Bryant kick), 7:43. Buccaneers 7–0. Drive: 3 plays, 65 yards, 1:02.

Second quarter

- TB – Ronde Barber 41-yard fumble return (Matt Bryant kick), 10:42. Buccaneers 14–0.

Third quarter

- TB – Matt Bryant 23-yard field goal, 6:35. Buccaneers 17–0. Drive: 8 plays, 49 yards, 3:22.
- TB – Alex Smith 21-yard pass from Jeff Garcia (Matt Bryant kick), 4:51. Buccaneers 24–0. Drive: 3 plays, 27 yards, 1:29.

Fourth quarter

- TB – Earnest Graham 26-yard run (Matt Bryant kick), 14:53. Buccaneers 31–0. Drive: 6 plays, 45 yards, 3:39.
- ATL – Adam Jennings 7-yard pass from Joey Harrington (Morten Anderson kick), 1:10. Buccaneers 31–7. Drive: 13 plays, 82 yards, 5:15.

Top passers

- TB – Jeff Garcia – 10/20, 159 yards, 2 TD
- ATL – Joey Harrington – 16/20, 139 yards, TD

Top rushers

- TB – Earnest Graham – 17 rushes, 102 yards, 2 TD
- ATL – Warrick Dunn – 15 rushes, 32 yards

Top receivers

- TB – Joey Galloway – 2 receptions, 63 yards, TD
- ATL – Michael Jenkins – 9 receptions, 73 yards

Tampa Bay faced their heated division rival for the first time this season, at the Georgia Dome. Tampa Bay dominated, and enjoyed the return of Michael Pittman from injury. Atlanta started quarterback Byron Leftwich. Atlanta suffered four turnovers, and 11 penalties for 105 yards in the loss.

In the first quarter, both teams traded punts on their opening drive. On Tampa Bay's second drive, Pittman caught an 11-yard pass but fumbled and it was recovered by Keith Brooking. An instant replay challenge upheld the ruling on the field. On the very next play, Byron Leftwich was hit as he released the ball, and it was intercepted by Barrett Ruud, who returned the ball to the 28-yard line. Tampa Bay drove 72 yards in three plays, as Joey Galloway caught a 44-yard touchdown.

In the second quarter, Leftwich was sacked from behind and fumbled the ball. Ronde Barber picked up the ball, and ran 41 yards for Tampa Bay's second touchdown. On Atlanta's next drive, Warrick Dunn fumbled at the 45-yard line. Atlanta challenged the ruling, and the call on the field was overturned and ruled an incomplete pass. The following play, Roddy White fumbled, and Brian Kelly recovered for Tampa Bay. He lateraled to Cato June, who then lost the ball. Despite an instant replay challenge by Tampa Bay, the ruling on the field was upheld. Atlanta, however, was unable to move down the field, and Tampa Bay took a 14–0 lead into halftime.

In the third quarter, Tampa Bay added a field goal, then Gaines Adams chopped Leftwich's arm as he threw and his floating pass was intercepted by Chris Hovan (later in the week NFL officials revised the play to a sack & fumble recovery). Tampa Bay quickly scored another touchdown catch by Alex Smith. In the fourth quarter, Earnest Graham took over the offense for Tampa Bay, rushing 102 yards total, and a touchdown score. Atlanta avoided the shutout, replacing Leftwich with Joey Harrington, and scored a touchdown with 1:10 to go.

=== Week 12: vs. Washington Redskins ===
Quarter	1	2	3	4	Total
Redskins	0	3	7	3	13
Buccaneers	10	9	0	0	19

at Raymond James Stadium – Tampa, Florida

- Date: Sunday November 25, 2007
- Game time: 1:00 p.m. EST
- Game weather: Warm, partly cloudy, 81 °F (27.2 °C)
- Game attendance: 65,596
- TV announcers (Fox): Sam Rosen, Tim Ryan, and Chris Myers (sideline reporter)

Game information

First quarter

- TB – Earnest Graham 1-yard run (Matt Bryant kick), 10:00. Buccaneers 7–0. Drive: 3 plays, 19 yards, 1:23.
- TB – Matt Bryant 35-yard field goal, 6:27. Buccaneers 10–0. Drive: 6 plays, 2 yards, 3:07.

Second quarter

- TB – Matt Bryant 27-yard field goal, 12:28. Buccaneers 13–0. Drive: 4 plays, 9 yards, 2:12.
- TB – Matt Bryant 48-yard field goal, 10:18. Buccaneers 16–0. Drive: 4 plays, 2 yards, 0:58.
- WSH – Shaun Suisham 43-yard field goal, 6:11. Buccaneers 16–3. Drive: 11 plays, 31 yards, 4:02.
- TB – Matt Bryant 39-yard field goal, 0:00. Buccaneers 19–3. Drive: 6 plays, 29 yards, 1:33.

Third quarter

- WSH – Chris Cooley 39-yard pass from Jason Campbell (Shaun Suisham kick), 10:38. Buccaneers 19–10. Drive: 9 plays, 73 yards, 4:22.

Fourth quarter

- WSH – Shaun Suisham 38-yard field goal, 11:19. Buccaneers 19–13. Drive: 12 plays, 37 yards, 4:45.

Top passers

- WSH – Jason Campbell – 30/49, 301 yards, TD, 2 INT
- TB – Bruce Gradkowski – 9/19, 106 yards

Top rushers

- WSH – Clinton Portis – 20 rushes, 68 yards
- TB – Earnest Graham – 21 rushes, 75 yards, TD

Top receivers

- WSH – Chris Cooley – 6 receptions, 96 yards, TD
- TB – Ike Hilliard – 4 receptions, 44 yards

Tampa Bay hosted Washington for the third time in three seasons during the month of November. Tampa Bay's defense dominated a good part of the game, forcing six turnovers, and despite quarterback Jeff Garcia sitting out most of the game, the Buccaneers held on for a 19–13 victory.

On the game's first play, Garcia tried to scramble, but injured his back upon being tackled by Cornelius Griffin. He lasted only two more plays, and was replaced by Bruce Gradkowski until early in the fourth quarter. Garcia's injury seemingly galvanized the Tampa Bay defense, who went on to cause 4 turnovers in the first half. Phillip Buchanon forced a fumble off the Redskins' first pass which was recovered by Tanard Jackson who advanced it 8 yards to the Washington 19. Three plays later, Earnest Graham scored a 1-yard touchdown run. On the third play of Washington's next drive, Greg White hit Clinton Portis hard, forcing a fumble which Jackson recovered at the 19-yard line. Tampa took a 10–0 lead after a Matt Bryant field goal.

Early in the second quarter, Greg White forced yet another fumble as he sacked Jason Campbell which Kevin Carter recovered. The turnover led to another field goal. Portis fumbled again on the following drive as he took a bone-jarring hit from Jermaine Phillips and Tampa Bay capitalized with a third field goal. Before the half, Washington got on the board with a field goal, then Tampa Bay kicked a fourth field goal as the half expired to lead, 19–3.

The second half saw Washington attempt a comeback. Despite injuring his hand, Campbell stayed in the game, and threw a 39-yard touchdown pass to Chris Cooley. Meanwhile, Gradkowski stayed in at quarterback for Tampa Bay, and continued to perform poorly. Tampa Bay managed only 9 yards of offense in the third quarter, and 0 yards passing. The Redskins drove 66 yards in 13 plays and over nine minutes to the Tampa Bay 4-yard line. Tampa Bay's defense held on 4th and 1 at the 4, however, as linebacker Derrick Brooks shed several blockers to down Portis for no gain.

Washington narrowed the score to 19–13 in the fourth quarter. With about 11 minutes to go, Jeff Garcia returned to the game, hoping to spark Tampa Bay's offense, and hold on for the win. He was unable to do much against the Redskins' well-rested and fired up defense, however, and Tampa Bay ended up having to punt. Josh Bidwell pinned the Redskins at their own 9-yard line, and Campbell drove them to the Tampa Bay 32-yard line. Ronde Barber stopped the threat when he intercepted the ball at the 28-yard line. With less than a minute to go, Campbell drove the Redskins to the Tampa Bay 16-yard line, but Brian Kelly intercepted the pass in the end zone with 17 seconds remaining, to clinch the victory for the Buccaneers.

=== Week 13: at New Orleans Saints ===
Quarter	1	2	3	4	Total
Buccaneers	3	10	7	7	27
Saints	7	7	7	2	23

at Louisiana Superdome – New Orleans

- Date: Sunday December 2, 2007
- Game time: 4:15 p.m. EST / 3:15 p.m. CST
- Game weather: Indoors
- Game attendance: 70,009
- Referee: Ron Winter
- TV announcers (Fox): Sam Rosen, Tim Ryan, and Eric Richey (sideline reporter)

Game information

First quarter

- TB – Matt Bryant 27-yard field goal, 9:54. Buccaneers 3–0. Drive: 10 plays, 65 yards, 5:06.
- NO – Terrance Copper 4-yard pass from Drew Brees (Olindo Mare kick), 2:05. Saints 7–3. Drive: 5 plays, 58 yards, 3:06.

Second quarter

- TB – Anthony Becht 1-yard pass from Luke McCown (Matt Bryant kick), 14:20. Buccaneers 10–7. Drive: 5 plays, 80 yards, 2:45.
- TB – Matt Bryant 31-yard field goal, 7:52. Buccaneers 13–7. Drive: 6 plays, 47 yards, 3:21.
- NO – Devery Henderson 45-yard pass from Drew Brees (Olindo Mare kick), 3:21. Saints 14–13. Drive: 6 plays, 67 yards, 4:31.

Third quarter

- TB – Earnest Graham 25-yard run (Matt Bryant kick), 9:36. Buccaneers 20–14. Drive: 6 plays, 55 yards, 3:27.
- NO – Mike McKenzie 53-yard interception return (Olindo Mare kick), 3:05. Saints 21–20.

Fourth quarter

- NO – Luke McCown sacked in end zone by Will Smith, 3:44. Saints 23–20.
- TB – Jerramy Stevens 4-yard pass from Luke McCown (Matt Bryant kick), 0:14. Buccaneers 27–23. Drive: 8 plays, 37 yards, 3:16.

Top passers

- TB – Luke McCown – 29/37, 313 yards, 2 TD, INT
- NO – Drew Brees – 17/23, 179 yards, 2 TD

Top rushers

- TB – Earnest Graham – 22 rushes, 106 yards, TD
- NO – Reggie Bush – 13 rushes, 64 yards

Top receivers

- TB – Joey Galloway – 7 receptions, 159 yards
- NO – Devery Henderson – 1 reception, 45 yards, TD

Tampa Bay took on the New Orleans Saints for the second time this season, this time at the Superdome. Luke McCown started at quarterback for the Buccaneers in place of the injured Jeff Garcia. McCown passed for 313 yards, and connected on his first 15 consecutive passes of the game.

The Buccaneers scored the first points of the game with Matt Bryant's 27-yard field goal. New Orleans answered with WR Terrance Copper catching a 4-yard touchdown pass from Drew Brees. Late in the first quarter, McCown connected with WR Joey Galloway for a 60-yard catch which set Tampa Bay up on 1-yard line.

Tampa Bay retook the lead early in the second quarter with TE Anthony Becht catching a 1-yard TD, and Matt Bryant making another field goal to increase the Tampa Bay lead to 13–7. New Orleans scored a touchdown just before halftime, a 45-yard pass to WR Devery Henderson, to make it 13–14 at halftime.

In the second half, RB Earnest Graham scored a 25-yard touchdown run. New Orleans had to punt on their ensuing possession, but disaster struck with 3 minutes remaining in the third quarter as miscommunication between McCown and Galloway led to a Saints interception which was returned for a touchdown.

Leading 21–20 with 4 minutes remaining in the game, Saints punter Steve Weatherford made a successful coffin corner punt which pinned the Buccaneers at their own 2-yard line. Two plays later, Delaware Will Smith sacked McCown for a safety. After the safety kick, New Orleans looked to run the clock out and seal the victory. However, in an unexpected and perhaps season-altering mistake, Reggie Bush fumbled a double reverse intended for WR Devery Henderson and Jovan Haye recovered for Tampa Bay at the New Orleans 37-yard line. Three plays later, the Buccaneers found themselves in a predicament as they faced a fourth down and 1 at the New Orleans 28. Instead of attempting a game-tying field goal, however, coach Jon Gruden went for it on fourth down, calling a run around right tackle which Graham converted for a first down. Three plays later, McCown found TE Jerramy Stevens for a 4-yard touchdown to win the game.

With the win, Tampa Bay improved to 8–4 and maintained a perfect division record. Tampa Bay only needed to win one game in the final four weeks to clinch the NFC South division crown.

=== Week 14: at Houston Texans ===
Quarter	1	2	3	4	Total
Buccaneers	0	7	7	0	14
Texans	7	7	7	7	28

at Reliant Stadium – Houston, Texas

- Date: Sunday December 9, 2007
- Game time: 1:00 p.m. EST / 12:00 p.m. CST
- Game weather: Indoors (retractable roof stadium)
- Game attendance: 70,237
- TV announcers (Fox): Dick Stockton (play-by-play) and Terry Donahue (color commentator), and Matt Samsell (sideline reporter)

Game information

First quarter

- HOU – Andre Johnson 4-yard pass from Sage Rosenfels (Kris Brown kick), 3:59. Texans 7–0. Drive: 12 plays, 66 yards, 6:19.

Second quarter

- TB – Earnest Graham 4-yard run (Matt Bryant kick), 10:57. Tied 7–7. Drive: 5 plays, 25 yards, 1:59.
- HOU – Kevin Walter 8-yard pass from Sage Rosenfels (Kris Brown kick), 4:38. Texans 14–7. Drive: 3 plays, 23 yards, 1:27.

Third quarter

- HOU – André Davis 97-yard kickoff return (Kris Brown kick), 14:46. Texans 21–7.
- TB – Earnest Graham 11-yard run (Matt Bryant kick), 12:38. Texans 21–14. Drive: 4 plays, 69 yards, 2:08.

Fourth quarter

- HOU – Owen Daniels 4-yard pass from Sage Rosenfels (Kris Brown kick), 14:56. Texans 28–14. Drive: 4 plays, 17 yards, 1:05.

Top passers

- TB – Luke McCown – 25/38, 266 yards
- HOU – Sage Rosenfels – 27/36, 209 yards, 3 TD

Top rushers

- TB – Earnest Graham – 15 rushes, 61 yards, 2 TD
- HOU – Darius Walker – 16 rushes, 46 yards

Top receivers

- TB – Joey Galloway – 6 receptions, 87 yards
- HOU – Andre Johnson – 9 receptions, 82 yards, TD

Tampa Bay faced the Texans for only the second time in the regular season, and for the first time during the regular season at Reliant Stadium. With a win, or losses by New Orleans and Carolina, Tampa Bay would clinch the NFC South division title. Tampa Bay's postseason berth, however, would have to wait at least another night, as the Texans capitalized on a sluggish Buccaneers squad.

For the second week in a row, Luke McCown started in place of injured Jeff Garcia. Meanwhile, back-up quarterback Sage Rosenfels led the Texans. Tampa Bay took the opening kickoff, and drove to the Houston 34-yard line. Coach Jon Gruden elected to go for it on 4th down and 2, but running back Earnest Graham was tackled for no gain. Houston took over on downs, and scored a quick and convincing touchdown pass. On the ensuing kickoff, Tampa Bay's Micheal Spurlock returned the ball 45 yards to the Houston 47. Even though the drive ended in a punt, the good field position helped pin the Texans deep on their next drive. Greg White sacked Rosenfels and forced a fumble, which was recovered by Jovan Haye the Houston 25. Five plays later, Earnest Graham scored his first rushing touchdown to tie the score 7–7.

Later in the second quarter, Ike Hilliard caught a pass for a first down at the Houston 28, but Will Demps hit Hillard in an apparent helmet-to-helmet and forced a fumble, but did not draw a penalty. Houston recovered, and soon scored a second touchdown to lead 14–7 at halftime.

Houston received the second half kickoff, which André Davis returned 97 yards for a touchdown. Just over two minutes later, Tampa Bay responded with a four-play, 69-yard drive, capped off by Graham's second rushing touchdown. Tampa Bay, however, did not score again.

Houston added another score early in the fourth quarter, and held on for a 28–14 victory. Tampa Bay fell to 8–5, but still controlled their own destiny for the division championship and overall playoff picture. A single victory in the final three weeks would clinch the NFC South championship. In other week 14 action, Carolina lost to Jacksonville, eliminating them from the division race, and New Orleans defeated Atlanta, keeping themselves mathematically alive for the division title.

=== Week 15: vs. Atlanta Falcons ===
Quarter	1	2	3	4	Total
Falcons	3	0	0	0	3
Buccaneers	14	13	3	7	37

at Raymond James Stadium – Tampa, Florida

- Game time: 1:00 p.m. EST
- Game weather: 68 °F or 20 °C (Sunny, windy)
- Game attendance: 65,133
- Referee: Jeff Triplette
- TV announcers (Fox): Matt Vasgersian (play-by-play), J.C. Pearson (color commentator), and Krista Voda (sideline reporter)

Game information

First quarter

- TB – Ronde Barber 29-yard interception return (Matt Bryant kick), 14:00. Buccaneers 7–0.
- ATL – Morten Andersen 33-yard field goal, 6:32. Buccaneers 7–3. Drive: 7 plays, 59 yards, 3:24.
- TB – Micheal Spurlock 90-yard kickoff return (Matt Bryant kick), 6:19. Buccaneers 14–3.

Second quarter

- TB – Matt Bryant 33-yard field goal, 11:24. Buccaneers 17–3. Drive: 14 plays, 56 yards, 8:24.
- TB – Earnest Graham 1-yard run (Matt Bryant kick), 4:09. Buccaneers 24–3. Drive: 3 plays, 3 yards, 1:06.
- TB – Matt Bryant 28-yard field goal, 0:00. Buccaneers 27–3. Drive: 6 plays, 16 yards, 0:55.

Third quarter

- TB – Matt Bryant 34-yard field goal, 4:08. Buccaneers 30–3. Drive: 4 plays, 7 yards, 2:20.

Fourth quarter

- TB – Anthony Becht 1-yard pass from Jeff Garcia (Matt Bryant kick), 7:42. Buccaneers 37–3. Drive: 8 plays, 55 yards, 5:08.

Top passers

- ATL – Chris Redman – 4/15, 34 yards, 2 INT
- TB – Jeff Garcia – 15/25, 109 yards, TD, INT

Top rushers

- ATL – Jerious Norwood – 9 rushes, 73 yards
- TB – Earnest Graham – 22 rushes, 79 yards, TD

Top receivers

- ATL – Laurent Robinson – 1 reception, 18 yards
- TB – Earnest Graham – 5 receptions, 40 yards

The Buccaneers stayed home this week for a rematch against their division rivals the Atlanta Falcons. With the convincing victory, Tampa Bay clinched the NFC South division title, maintained a perfect 5–0 division record, and scored their first kickoff return touchdown in franchise history.

Tampa Bay's defense recorded the first points of the game, as Ronde Barber intercepted Chris Redman's pass on the third play of the game and returned it 29 yards for a touchdown. Atlanta got on the board next with kicker Morten Andersen making a 33-yard field goal. On the ensuing kickoff, Micheal Spurlock made team history by becoming the first Buccaneer player to return a kickoff for a touchdown. It was the first kickoff return touchdown for Tampa Bay in 32 seasons, 498 games, and 1,865 attempts.

After the Buccaneer defense forced a Falcons punt, Jeff Garcia commandeered a long, clock-eating 10-minute drive ending in a 33-yard field goal by Matt Bryant to make the score 17–3. With just over five minutes remaining in the first half, Tampa Bay recovered an Atlanta fumble, and Earnest Graham scored a 1-yard TD run. Graham became the first player in club history to score a touchdown in six consecutive games. With a 24–3 lead, Tampa Bay performed a pooch kickoff, and Atlanta muffed the return, while Kalvin Pearson recovered. Tampa Bay drove to the 24-yard line, but DeAngelo Hall intercepted a pass intended for Joey Galloway at the Atlanta 11-yard line. The Buccaneers would immediately regain possession as Greg White forced and recovered a fumble on the next play. Matt Bryant then easily converted a 28-yard field goal to take a 27–3 lead into halftime.

Tampa Bay would receive the second half's opening kickoff, but was forced to punt after a 7-minute drive. On Atlanta's third play, Jermaine Phillips intercepted a pass intended for Jerious Norwood which set Tampa Bay up at the Atlanta 23-yard line. Matt Bryant then scored the half's first points with a 34-yard field goal to make the score 30–3. In the fourth quarter, punter Josh Bidwell successfully pinned Atlanta at their own 6-yard line. The resulting poor field position eventually led to Tampa Bay taking over near midfield. Michael Bennett carried six times all the way to the Atlanta 1-yard line, from which Anthony Becht scored the game's final points off a 1-yard TD catch.

Statistically, Tampa Bay's defense dominated Atlanta. The Falcons managed only 133 yards of total offense, committed five turnovers, and were 0-for-9 on third down conversions. The Falcons crossed midfield only once, and Tampa Bay's time of possession was 43 minutes. On the following Wednesday, the kickoff return touchdown earned Spurlock the NFC Special Teams Player of the Week award.

=== Week 16: at San Francisco 49ers ===
Quarter	1	2	3	4	Total
Buccaneers	6	7	0	6	19
49ers	0	7	7	7	21

at Bill Walsh Field at Monster Park – San Francisco

- Date: Sunday December 23, 2007
- Game time: 4:05 p.m. EST / 1:05 p.m. PST
- Game weather: 51 °F (10.6 °C), clear
- Game attendance: 68,193
- TV announcers (Fox): Dick Stockton, Brian Baldinger, and Charissa Thompson (sideline reporter)

Game information

First quarter

- TB – Matt Bryant 34-yard field goal, 8:09. Buccaneers 3–0. Drive: 10 plays, 64 yards, 5:08.
- TB – Matt Bryant 22-yard field goal, 2:36. Buccaneers 6–0. Drive: 8 plays, 58 yards, 3:48.

Second quarter

- SF – Darrell Jackson 21-yard pass from Shaun Hill (Joe Nedney kick), 14:56. 49ers 7–6. Drive: 7 plays, 72 yards, 2:40.
- TB – Jerramy Stevens 24-yard pass from Jeff Garcia (Matt Bryant kick), 3:49. Buccaneers 13–7. Drive: 4 plays, 36 yards, 1:44.

Third quarter

- SF – Vernon Davis 5-yard pass from Shaun Hill (Joe Nedney kick), 9:30. 49ers 14–13. Drive: 3 plays, 14 yards, 1:27.

Fourth quarter

- SF – Frank Gore 23-yard pass from Shaun Hill (Joe Nedney kick), 14:11. 49ers 21–13. Drive: 1 play, 23 yards, 0:06.
- TB – Jerramy Stevens 24-yard pass from Luke McCown (pass failed), 1:20. 49ers 21–19. Drive: 8 plays, 43 yards, 1:25.

Top passers

- TB – Jeff Garcia – 12/20, 196 yards, TD
- SF – Shaun Hill – 11/24, 123 yards, 3 TD, INT

Top rushers

- TB – Earnest Graham – 9 rushes, 21 yards
- SF – Frank Gore – 21 rushes, 89 yards

Top receivers

- TB – Alex Smith – 6 receptions, 79 yards
- SF – Frank Gore – 4 receptions, 43 yards, TD

Tampa Bay traveled west to San Francisco for the third time in five seasons. Tampa Bay lost their eighth consecutive meeting at Monster Park, dating to 1980. This game was originally scheduled for 8:15 p.m. on NBC's Sunday Night Football, but on December 10, in accordance with flex-scheduling, the game was moved to the afternoon. Having already clinched a playoff berth, Tampa Bay rested most of their starters in the second half. Despite a late rally, the Buccaneers fell two points short of victory.

Tampa Bay controlled most of the first half, capping off their first two drives of the first quarter with field goals by Matt Bryant. On the first play of the second quarter, Shaun Hill connected with Darrell Jackson on a 21-yard touchdown.

San Francisco punted on their next drive, and Micheal Spurlock fielded the ball at the 19-yard line. He was tackled and fumbled, while the 49ers recovered. After an instant replay challenge, it was determined that Spurlock was down by contact, and Tampa Bay maintained possession. The drive fizzled though, and ended with a punt. Late in the fourth quarter, Barrett Ruud recovered a 49ers fumble, setting the Buccaneers up on the San Francisco 36-yard line. Four plays later, Jerramy Stevens caught a touchdown pass from Jeff Garcia. Tampa Bay took a 13–7 lead into halftime.

On the second-half kickoff, San Francisco recovered a surprise onside kick. The drive came up empty, as they were forced to punt. On Tampa Bay's next possession, however, Luke McCown (who had taken over for the benched Garcia) fumbled and the 49ers recovered at the 14-yard line. In four plays, San Francisco scored a touchdown.

Early in the fourth quarter, Nate Clements intercepted a McCown pass, and led to another 49ers touchdown. The 49ers led 21–13, but Tampa Bay still kept hopes alive for a rally. With less than six minutes left in the game, the Buccaneers drove to the 49ers 25-yard line. On 4th down and 6, McCown threw to Michael Clayton for an apparent one-handed touchdown catch, but the ball fell incomplete, and the drive turned over on downs. Tampa Bay managed one final chance to tie the score. Inside the two-minute warning, Tampa Bay drove to the 49ers 24-yard line. McCown rolled out wide to his right, and connected with Stevens for a 24-yard touchdown. McCown then attempted a game-tying two-point conversion. Michael Clayton caught the pass, but one of his feet touched out-of-bounds in the back of the endzone, sealing the game for San Francisco.

=== Week 17: vs. Carolina Panthers ===
Quarter	1	2	3	4	Total
Panthers	7	10	7	7	31
Buccaneers	7	6	7	3	23

at Raymond James Stadium – Tampa, Florida

- Date: Sunday December 30, 2007
- Game time: 1:00 p.m. EST
- Game weather: 80 °F (26.7 °C), Mostly Cloudy
- Game attendance: 65,609
- TV announcers (Fox): Ron Pitts, Tony Boselli, and Chip Carter (sideline reporter)

Game information

First quarter

- TB – Jerramy Stevens 3-yard pass from Luke McCown (Matt Bryant kick), 11:04. Buccaneers 7–0. Drive: 7 plays, 67 yards, 3:56.
- CAR – Christian Fauria 2-yard pass from Matt Moore (John Kasay kick), 3:55. Tied 7–7. Drive: 14 plays, 70 yards, 7:09.

Second quarter

- TB – Matt Bryant 31-yard field goal, 12:32. Buccaneers 10–7. Drive: 4 plays, 8 yards, 1:40.
- CAR – Dante Rosario 20-yard pass from Matt Moore (John Kasay kick), 6:40. Panthers 14–10. Drive: 11 plays, 66 yards, 5:52.
- TB – Matt Bryant 23-yard field goal, 2:34. Panthers 14–13. Drive: 12 plays, 4 yards, 1:20.
- CAR – John Kasay 19-yard field goal, 0:16. Panthers 17–13. Drive: 7 plays, 34 yards, 2:18.

Third quarter

- TB – Michael Bennett 23-yard pass from Luke McCown (Matt Bryant kick), 6:57. Buccaneers 20–17. Drive: 10 plays, 48 yards, 5:44.
- CAR – DeAngelo Williams 1-yard run (John Kasay kick), 4:03. Panthers 24–20. Drive: 5 plays, 68 yards, 2:54.

Fourth quarter

- TB – Matt Bryant 49-yard field goal, 14:02. Panthers 24–23. Drive: 5 plays, 14 yards, 1:21.
- CAR – DeAngelo Williams 32-yard run (John Kasay kick), 6:24. Panthers 31–23. Drive: 6 plays, 69 yards, 3:21.

Top passers

- CAR – Matt Moore – 15/24, 174 yards, 2 TD, INT
- TB – Luke McCown – 21/28, 236 yards, 2 TD, INT

Top rushers

- CAR – DeAngelo Williams – 20 rushes, 121 yards, 2 TD
- TB – Luke McCown – 5 rushes, 47 yards

Top receivers

- CAR – Drew Carter – 2 receptions, 59 yards
- TB – Chad Lucas – 5 receptions, 82 yards

Tampa Bay concluded the regular season at home against the Panthers. They dropped the season finale, and their second-straight game, but rested most of their starters (including Garcia, Graham, Galloway and Ruud). Luke McCown started at quarterback.

On their opening drive, McCown drove the Buccaneers for the game's first score, a touchdown pass to Jerramy Stevens. The drive included a 52-yard catch by Chad Lucas. Carolina responded by driving to the Tampa Bay 4-yard line. A field goal kick was good, but a holding penalty by Derrick Brooks gave the Panthers a first down. They capitalized by scoring a touchdown.

In the second quarter, an interception by Phillip Buchanon led to a Tampa Bay field goal. Late in the second quarter, Josh Bidwell punted to Carolina, but a fumble on the return was recovered by the Buccaneers. Tampa Bay tacked on another field goal before halftime, and trailed, 14–13, at the half.

Midway through the third quarter, Carolina punted and pinned the Buccaneers on their own 2-yard line. McCown then led the Buccaneers on a 10-play, 98-yard touchdown drive, the longest such scoring drive in franchise history. Carolina kept themselves in the game, however, quickly following up with a 46-yard reception to Drew Carter, and then a 1-yard touchdown run.

Trailing 31–23 late in the fourth quarter, McCown drove the Buccaneers to the Carolina 36-yard line, but was intercepted by Richard Marshall.

== Playoffs ==
Postseason
Wild Card	January 6, 2008	New York Giants	L 14–24	0–1	Raymond James Stadium

=== NFC Wild Card playoff: New York Giants 24, Tampa Bay Buccaneers 14 ===
Quarter	1	2	3	4	Total
Giants	0	14	3	7	24
Buccaneers	7	0	0	7	14

at Raymond James Stadium, Tampa, Florida

- Game time: 1:00 pm. EST
- Game weather: 70 °F (21.1 °C), sunny
- Game attendance: 65,621
- Referee: Walt Anderson
- TV announcers (Fox): Joe Buck (play-by-play), Troy Aikman (color commentator), Pam Oliver and Chris Myers (field reporters)

Game information

1st Quarter

- TB – Earnest Graham 1-yard run (Matt Bryant kick), 1:49. Buccaneers 7–0. Drive: 10 plays, 54 yards, 5:13.

2nd Quarter

- NYG – Brandon Jacobs 5-yard pass from Eli Manning (Lawrence Tynes kick), 10:02. Tied 7–7. Drive: 8 plays, 53 yards, 4:04.
- NYG – Brandon Jacobs 8-yard run (Lawrence Tynes kick), 4:06. Giants 14–7. Drive: 7 plays, 65 yards, 4:23.

3rd Quarter

- NYG – Lawrence Tynes 25-yard field goal, 9:56. Giants 17–7. Drive: 9 plays, 23 yards, 4:54.

4th Quarter

- NYG – Amani Toomer 4-yard pass from Eli Manning (Lawrence Tynes kick), 8:03. Giants 24–7. Drive: 15 plays, 92 yards in 8:37
- TB – Alex Smith 6-yard pass from Jeff Garcia (Matt Bryant kick), 3:25. Giants 24–14. Drive: 12 plays, 88 yards, 4:38.

Top passers

- NYG – Eli Manning – 20/27, 185 yards, 2 TD
- TB – Jeff Garcia – 23/39, 207 yards, TD, 2 INT

Top rushers

- NYG – Ahmad Bradshaw – 17 rushes, 66 yards
- TB – Earnest Graham – 18 rushes, 63 yards, TD

Top receivers

- NYG – Amani Toomer – 7 receptions, 74 yards, TD
- TB – Michael Pittman – 5 receptions, 62 yards

With the loss, the Buccaneers season ended as a one done team. This would mark the last playoff game for the Buccaneers until 2020 and their last Wild Card loss until 2022.

== Offseason ==
- On January 22, 2008, head coach Jon Gruden and general manager Bruce Allen were re-signed to a three-year contract extension.
- On January 24, 2008, Mike Alstott scheduled a press conference, and is expected to retire.
