= 2009 Tampa Bay Buccaneers season =

NFL team season

- Owner: Malcolm Glazer
- General manager: Mark Dominik
- Head coach: Raheem Morris
- Home stadium: Raymond James Stadium

Results
- Record: 3–13
- Division place: 4th NFC South
- Playoffs: Did not qualify

Uniform
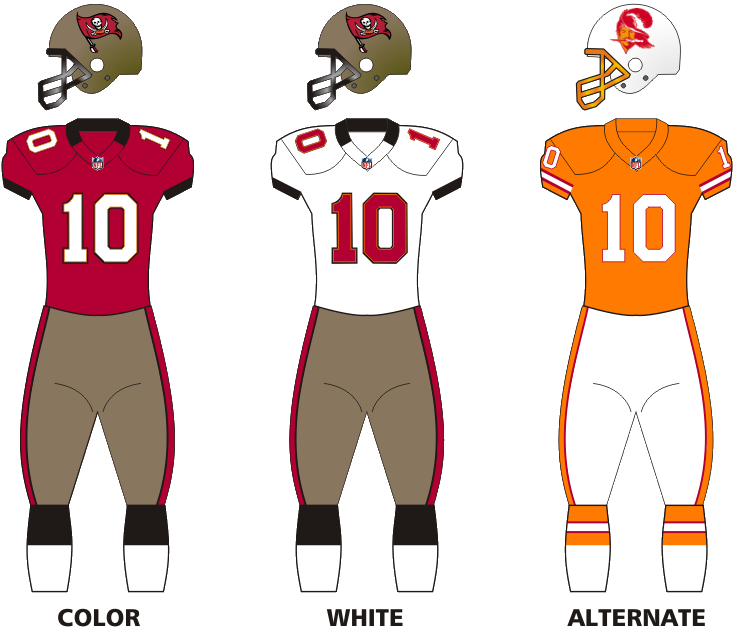

The 2009 Tampa Bay Buccaneers season was the franchise's 34th season in the National Football League (NFL), the 12th playing their home games at Raymond James Stadium, and the first under head coach Raheem Morris. The Buccaneers looked to improve on their 9–7 record from their 2008 season and 3rd-place finish in the NFC South but failed to do so as they finished the season at 3–13, missing the playoffs for the second straight year.

The Buccaneers played seven of their home games at Raymond James Stadium. One of their home games was played at Wembley Stadium, as part of the International Series, in which they lost to the New England Patriots 35–7.

The Buccaneers unveiled a Ring of Honor to celebrate the 30th anniversary of the 1979 franchise. Lee Roy Selmon was the first inductee when the team wore throwback uniforms on November 8 in a game against Green Bay that they won 38–28.

== Off-season ==
=== Coaching change ===
On January 16, 2009, less than three weeks after the 2008 regular season concluded, head coach Jon Gruden and general manager Bruce Allen were fired. The following day, Raheem Morris, recently promoted from defensive backs coach to defensive coordinator, was instead elevated to head coach, with Mark Dominik named general manager. The remainder of the coaching staff was finalized by mid-February.

=== Key signings ===
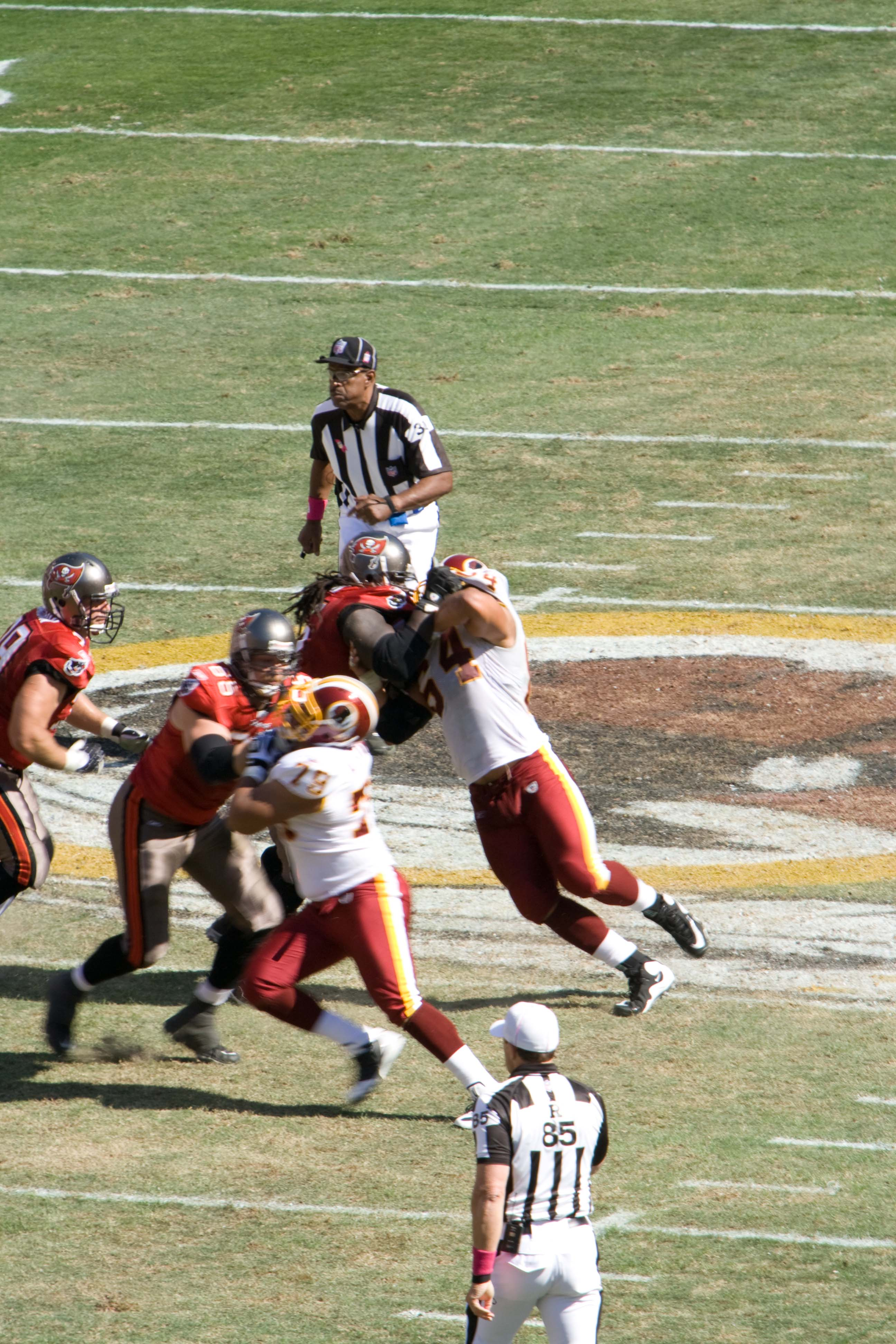
Tampa Bay playing at Washington on October 4

- Luke McCown was re-signed to a two-year contract on February 9 worth $7.5 million.
- Derrick Ward
- Angelo Crowell
- Byron Leftwich (signed two-year deal worth $7.5 million)
- Dirk Johnson was signed as punter to replace Josh Bidwell (who was placed on IR due to a hip injury).

=== Acquisitions ===
- Acquired Kellen Winslow II in a trade with Cleveland for a second-round draft pick in 2009 and a fifth-round pick in 2010 on February 27.

=== Selected cuts/losses ===
- Jeff Garcia
- Micheal Spurlock
- Derrick Brooks
- Warrick Dunn
- Joey Galloway
- Ike Hilliard
- Cato June
- Phillip Buchanon
- Brian Griese
- Matt Bryant
- Luke McCown was traded to the Jacksonville Jaguars for a 2010 undisclosed draft pick on September 5, 2009.

== 2009 NFL draft ==
2009 Tampa Bay Buccaneers Draft Selections
Draft order		Player name	Position	Height	Weight	College
Round	Choice	Player name	Position	Height	Weight	College
1	17	Josh Freeman	QB	6'6"	248	Kansas State
2		Traded to Cleveland				
3	81	Roy Miller	DT	6'1"	310	Texas
4	117	Kyle Moore	DE	6'6"	272	USC
5	155	Xavier Fulton	OT	6'4"	302	Illinois
6		Traded to Chicago				
7	217	E. J. Biggers	CB	6'0"	180	Western Michigan
7		Traded to Pittsburgh				
7	233	Sammie Stroughter	WR	5'10"	189	Oregon State

- Tampa Bay traded their second-round selection and 2010 fifth-round selection to Cleveland for Kellen Winslow, Jr.
- Baltimore traded conditional late-round selections in 2009 and 2010 to Tampa Bay for Marques Douglas.
- Tampa Bay traded their sixth-round selection to Chicago for Brian Griese. In a separate deal, the Bears traded their own sixth-round selection to the Buccaneers for Dan Buenning.
- Jacksonville traded their seventh-round selection in 2009 and two selections in 2008 to Tampa Bay for their second-round selection in 2008 (used to select Quentin Groves).
- Tampa Bay traded their own 2009 seventh-round selection to Pittsburgh for Sean Mahan.

== Staff ==
2009 Tampa Bay Buccaneers staff
Front office: Owner/President – Malcolm Glazer; Head coaches: Head coach – Raheem Morris; Associate head coach/special teams coordinator – Richard Bisaccia; Assistant head coach/wide receivers – Richard Mann; Assistant to the head coach – Jay Kaiser; Offensive coaches: Offensive coordinator/quarterbacks – Greg Olson; Running backs – Steve Logan; Assistant wide receivers – Tim Berbenich; Tight ends – Alfredo Roberts; Offensive line – Pete Mangurian; Assistant offensive line – Chris Mosley; Offensive assistant – Tim Holt	Defensive coaches: Defensive coordinator – Jim Bates; Defensive line – Robert Nunn; Defensive line – Todd Wash; Linebackers – Joe Barry; Defensive backs – Joe Baker; Assistant defensive backs – Dwayne Stukes; Defensive quality control – Ejiro Evero; Strength and conditioning: Head strength and conditioning – Kurtis Schultz; Assistant strength and conditioning – Chris Meenan

== Final roster ==
2009 Tampa Bay Buccaneers roster
Quarterbacks (QB): 12 Rudy Carpenter; 5 Josh Freeman; 11 Josh Johnson; Running backs (RB): 32 Kareem Huggins; 45 Chris Pressley FB; 28 Derrick Ward; 24 Cadillac Williams; Wide receivers (WR): 16 Mark Bradley; 89 Antonio Bryant; 87 Brian Clark; 80 Michael Clayton; 83 Terrence Nunn; 81 Micheal Spurlock; 85 Maurice Stovall; 19 Mario Urrutia; Tight ends (TE): 88 John Gilmore; 46 Ryan Purvis; 86 Jerramy Stevens; 82 Kellen Winslow II	Offensive linemen (OL): 61 Jonathan Compas C; 69 Demar Dotson T; 52 Jeff Faine C; 75 Davin Joseph G; 77 James Lee T; 74 Shawn Murphy G; 70 Donald Penn T; 65 Jeremy Trueblood T; 76 Jeremy Zuttah G; Defensive linemen (DL): 71 Michael Bennett DE; 96 Tim Crowder DE; 95 Chris Hovan DT; 93 Roy Miller DT; 92 Dre Moore DT; 94 Kyle Moore DE; 98 Ryan Sims DT; 91 Stylez G. White DE	Linebackers (LB): 58 Quincy Black OLB; 54 Geno Hayes OLB; 57 Adam Hayward OLB; 53 Niko Koutouvides MLB; 50 Matt McCoy OLB; 51 Barrett Ruud MLB; Defensive backs (DB): 20 Ronde Barber CB; 43 De'von Hall FS; 36 Tanard Jackson FS; 41 Corey Lynch SS; 33 Elbert Mack CB; 21 Sabby Piscitelli SS; 29 Derrick Roberson CB; 25 Aqib Talib CB; Special teams (ST): 10 Connor Barth K; 48 Andrew Economos LS; 2 Sam Paulescu P	Practice squad: 38 Brandon Anderson CB; 47 Jehuu Caulcrick FB; 39 Emanuel Cook S; 62 Marc Dile G; 79 Maurice Evans DE (PS/I); 60 Joshua Leonard DE; 49 Lee Robinson LB; 30 Stoney Woodson CB; Reserve: 26 Will Allen S (IR); 35 B. J. Askew FB (NF-Inj.); 9 Josh Bidwell P (IR); 31 E. J. Biggers CB (IR); 27 Torrie Cox CB (IR); 59 Angelo Crowell LB (IR); 68 Xavier Fulton T (IR); 34 Earnest Graham RB (IR); 8 Dirk Johnson P (IR); 7 Byron Leftwich QB (IR); 23 Jermaine Phillips S (IR); 78 Arron Sears G (NF-Ill.); 22 Clifton Smith RB/KR/PR(IR); 44 Byron Storer FB (IR); 18 Sammie Stroughter WR (IR); 97 Jimmy Wilkerson DE (IR); 56 Rod Wilson LB (IR); Rookies in italics 53 active, 18 reserve, 7 practice squad

== Schedule ==
=== Preseason ===
Week	Date	Opponent	Result	Record	Venue	Recap
1	August 15	at Tennessee Titans	L 20–27	0–1	LP Field	Recap
2	August 22	at Jacksonville Jaguars	W 24–23	1–1	Jacksonville Municipal Stadium	Recap
3	August 27	Miami Dolphins	L 6–10	1–2	Raymond James Stadium	Recap
4	September 4	Houston Texans	L 20–27	1–3	Raymond James Stadium	Recap

==== News ====
- The Buccaneers announced that they would not return to Disney's Wide World of Sports Complex to hold Training Camp, where they had done so from 2002 to 2008. Training camp instead would be held at the team's regular facilities at One Buc Place.
- John Lynch joined Chris Myers in the preseason booth for games televised on WFLA-TV. Dan Lucas served as sideline reporter.
- On August 18, free safety Tanard Jackson was suspended four regular-season games for violating the NFL Substance Abuse policy.
- On August 19, Aqib Talib was arrested, accused of simple battery and resisting arrest.
- Ten days before the start of the regular season, offensive coordinator Jeff Jagodzinski was fired. Quarterbacks coach Greg Olson was elevated into the vacancy.

=== Regular season ===
Week	Date	Opponent	Result	Record	Venue	Recap
1	September 13	Dallas Cowboys	L 21–34	0–1	Raymond James Stadium	Recap
2	September 20	at Buffalo Bills	L 20–33	0–2	Ralph Wilson Stadium	Recap
3	September 27	New York Giants	L 0–24	0–3	Raymond James Stadium	Recap
4	October 4	at Washington Redskins	L 13–16	0–4	FedExField	Recap
5	October 11	at Philadelphia Eagles	L 14–33	0–5	Lincoln Financial Field	Recap
6	October 18	Carolina Panthers	L 21–28	0–6	Raymond James Stadium	Recap
7	October 25	New England Patriots	L 7–35	0–7	(United Kingdom) Wembley Stadium (London)	Recap
8	Bye					
9	November 8	Green Bay Packers	W 38–28	1–7	Raymond James Stadium	Recap
10	November 15	at Miami Dolphins	L 23–25	1–8	Land Shark Stadium	Recap
11	November 22	New Orleans Saints	L 7–38	1–9	Raymond James Stadium	Recap
12	November 29	at Atlanta Falcons	L 17–20	1–10	Georgia Dome	Recap
13	December 6	at Carolina Panthers	L 6–16	1–11	Bank of America Stadium	Recap
14	December 13	New York Jets	L 3–26	1–12	Raymond James Stadium	Recap
15	December 20	at Seattle Seahawks	W 24–7	2–12	Qwest Field	Recap
16	December 27	at New Orleans Saints	W 20–17 (OT)	3–12	Louisiana Superdome	Recap
17	January 3	Atlanta Falcons	L 10–20	3–13	Raymond James Stadium	Recap

== Standings ==
NFC South
	W	L	T	PCT	DIV	CONF	PF	PA	STK
^{(1)} New Orleans Saints	13	3	0	.813	4–2	9–3	510	341	L3
Atlanta Falcons	9	7	0	.563	3–3	6–6	363	325	W3
Carolina Panthers	8	8	0	.500	4–2	8–4	315	308	W3
Tampa Bay Buccaneers	3	13	0	.188	1–5	3–9	244	400	L1

== Game summaries ==
=== Week 1: vs. Dallas Cowboys ===
Quarter	1	2	3	4	Total
Cowboys	6	7	7	14	34
Buccaneers	0	7	0	14	21

at Raymond James Stadium, Tampa, Florida

- Game time: 1:00 p.m. EDT
- Game weather: 85 °F (29 °C) (Cloudy)
- Game attendance: 63,806
- Referee: Alberto Riveron
- TV announcers (Fox): Kenny Albert, Daryl Johnston, & Tony Siragusa

The first regular season game for head coach Raheem Morris saw the Buccaneers fall to the Dallas Cowboys by a score of 34–21. Running back Cadillac Williams returned as a starter, and rushed for 97 yards and one touchdown. Quarterback Byron Leftwich threw for 276 yards, one touchdown, and no interceptions. The Buccaneer defense, however, gave up three big plays in the loss.

Dallas quarterback Tony Romo threw for a career-best 353 yards. Three long touchdown passes (66, 80, 44 yards respectively) put the game out of reach. Early in the fourth quarter, Tampa Bay closed the deficit to 20–14, but Romo's 80-yard catch & run to Patrick Crayton put the Cowboys ahead for good.

On specials teams, kicker Mike Nugent had one field goal attempt blocked, and shanked another.

=== Week 2: at Buffalo Bills ===
Quarter	1	2	3	4	Total
Buccaneers	0	14	0	6	20
Bills	17	3	0	13	33

at Ralph Wilson Stadium, Orchard Park, New York

- Game time: 4:05 p.m. EDT
- Game weather: Sunny, 74 °F (23 °C)
- Game attendance: 70,318
- Referee: Ron Winter
- TV announcers (Fox): Kenny Albert, Daryl Johnston, & Tony Siragusa

The Buccaneers made their first regular season trip in franchise history to Ralph Wilson Stadium to meet the Bills. The Buccaneers had played only one time at Buffalo, a preseason game in 1977. Byron Leftwich threw for 296 yards and three touchdowns, but the Bills held Tampa Bay to only 57 yards rushing, and the Buccaneers had 13 penalties for 112 yard in the loss.

Leading 20–7 with less than a minute remaining in the first half, Buffalo looked to score once more. However, Fred Jackson fumbled at the Tampa Bay 16, and Sabby Piscitelli recovered. Piscitelli ran 72 yards to the Buffalo 8, and after a touchdown on the next play, Tampa Bay trimmed the deficit to 20–14.

Late in the fourth quarter, Leftwich led the Buccaneers on 14-play scoring drive, twice converting on 4th down. The touchdown could have brought the Buccaneers within 8 points, but a failed two-point conversion ultimately foiled the comeback. Tampa Bay dropped to 0–2, and lost their sixth consecutive game, dating back to 2008.

=== Week 3: vs. New York Giants ===
Quarter	1	2	3	4	Total
Giants	7	7	3	7	24
Buccaneers	0	0	0	0	0

at Raymond James Stadium, Tampa, Florida

- Game time: 1:00 p.m. EDT
- Game weather: 88 °F (31 °C) (Cloudy)
- Game attendance: 63,689
- Referee: Jeff Triplette
- TV announcers (Fox): Kenny Albert, Daryl Johnston, & Tony Siragusa

Still looking for their first win of the season, the Buccaneers went home for a Week 3 duel with the New York Giants. Tampa Bay would trail early in the first quarter with Giants running back Brandon Jacobs getting a 6-yard touchdown run. The Buccaneers'deficit would climb in the second quarter with quarterback Eli Manning's 4-yard touchdown pass to wide receiver Steve Smith.

New York continued its dominance in the third quarter with kicker Lawrence Tynes nailing a 26-yard field goal. In the fourth quarter, the Giants would close out the game with Manning's 18-yard touchdown pass to wide receiver Sinorice Moss.

With the loss, the Buccaneers fell to 0–3.

=== Week 4: at Washington Redskins ===
Quarter	1	2	3	4	Total
Buccaneers	7	3	0	3	13
Redskins	0	0	16	0	16

at FedExField, Landover, Maryland

- Game time: 1:00 PM EDT
- Game weather: 69 °F (21 °C) (Sunny)
- Game attendance: 86,412
- Referee: Ed Hochuli
- TV announcers (Fox): Sam Rosen, Tim Ryan, & Laura Okmin

Following their shutout home loss to the Giants, the Buccaneers flew to FedExField for a Week 4 duel with the Washington Redskins. Due to Byron Leftwich's poor performance during the first three weeks of the season, quarterback Josh Johnson would get his first career start.

Tampa Bay would come out firing in the first quarter with Johnson's 8-yard touchdown pass to wide receiver Antonio Bryant, followed by kicker Mike Nugent's 37-yard field goal in the second quarter. However, the Redskins came back with a vengeance in the third quarter. Kicker Shaun Suisham would get a 42-yard field goal, followed by quarterback Jason Campbell's 17-yard touchdown pass to tight end Chris Cooley (with a blocked PAT) and a 59-yard touchdown pass to wide receiver Santana Moss. The Bucs tried to rally in the fourth quarter as Nugent nailed a 22-yard field goal, but Washington's defense would prevent any further progress.

With the loss, the Buccaneers fell to 0–4.

=== Week 5: at Philadelphia Eagles ===
Quarter	1	2	3	4	Total
Buccaneers	0	7	0	7	14
Eagles	7	14	7	5	33

at Lincoln Financial Field, Philadelphia

- Game time: 1:00 PM EDT
- Game weather: 62 °F (17 °C) (Mostly Sunny)
- Game attendance: 69,144
- Referee: Terry McAulay
- TV announcers (Fox): Sam Rosen & Tim Ryan

Hoping for their first win of the season, the Buccaneers flew to Lincoln Financial Field for a Week 5 duel with the Philadelphia Eagles. Tampa Bay would immediately trail in the first quarter as Eagles quarterback Donovan McNabb hooked up with wide receiver Jeremy Maclin on a 51-yard touchdown pass. Philadelphia would increase their lead in the second quarter with McNabb completing a 20-yard touchdown pass to fullback Leonard Weaver. The Buccaneers would get on the board with quarterback Josh Johnson's 9-yard touchdown pass to tight end Kellen Winslow, but the Eagles would close out the first half with McNabb finding Maclin again on a 40-yard touchdown 40-yard touchdown pass.

In the third quarter, Philadelphia would increase their lead with running back Brian Westbrook getting a 7-yard touchdown run. The Eagles would then start off the fourth quarter with kicker David Akers nailing a 44-yard field goal. Tampa Bay tried to rally as Johnson connected with Winslow again on a 9-yard touchdown pass, but Philadelphia closed out the game with defensive end Darren Howard tackling running back Cadillac Williams in his endzone for a safety.

With the loss, the Buccaneers fell to 0–5.

=== Week 6: vs. Carolina Panthers ===
Quarter	1	2	3	4	Total
Panthers	0	7	14	7	28
Buccaneers	7	0	7	7	21

at Raymond James Stadium, Tampa, Florida

- Game time: 1:00 PM EDT
- Game weather: 64 °F (18 °C) (Sunny)
- Game attendance: 62,422
- Referee: John Parry
- TV announcers (Fox): Dick Stockton & Charles Davis

Still trying to acquire their first win of the season, the Buccaneers went home for a Week 6 NFC South duel with the Carolina Panthers. Tampa Bay sailed off to a good start in the first quarter with a 20-yard touchdown run from running back Cadillac Williams. However, the Panthers would tie the game in the second quarter with running back DeAngelo Williams getting a 20-yard touchdown run.

During the second quarter, punt returner Clifton Smith left the game due to a concussion caused by Panthers cornerback Dante Wesley ramming into Smith. Wesley was flagged for unnecessary roughness and was ejected.

Carolina would take the lead in the third quarter with quarterback Jake Delhomme completing a 1-yard touchdown pass to tight end Jeff King and running back Jonathan Stewart getting a 26-yard touchdown, yet the Buccaneers immediately got themselves back into the game as rookie wide receiver Sammie Stroughter returned the kickoff 97 yards for a touchdown. In the fourth quarter, Tampa Bay tied the game with safety Tanard Jackson's 26-yard interception return for a touchdown. However, the Panthers delivered the final blow with Williams' 1-yard touchdown run.

With the loss, the Buccaneers fell to 0–6 for the 1st time since 1985.

=== Week 7: vs. New England Patriots ===
Quarter	1	2	3	4	Total
Patriots	14	7	7	7	35
Buccaneers	0	7	0	0	7

at Wembley Stadium, London, England

- Game time: 1:00 PM EDT/5:00 pm GMT
- Game weather: 59 °F (15 °C) (Partly Cloudy)
- Game attendance: 84,254
- Referee: Jerome Boger
- TV announcers (CBS): Jim Nantz & Phil Simms

Still on the hunt for their first win of the season, the Buccaneers flew to Wembley Stadium for Week 7's NFL International game with the New England Patriots. For this game, Tampa Bay was listed as the home team.

The Buccaneers would trail early in the first quarter as Patriots safety Brandon Meriweather returned an interception 39 yards for a touchdown, followed by quarterback Tom Brady finding wide receiver Wes Welker on a 14-yard touchdown pass. New England increased their lead in the second quarter as Brady completed a 54-yard touchdown pass to wide receiver Sam Aiken, yet Tampa Bay would get onto the board with quarterback Josh Johnson completing a 33-yard touchdown pass to wide receiver Antonio Bryant.

However, the Patriots took control throughout the second half as Brady hooked up with tight end Benjamin Watson on a 35-yard touchdown pass, while running back Laurence Maroney got himself a 1-yard touchdown run.

With the loss, the Buccaneers went into their bye week at 0–7 for the 1st time since 1985.

=== Week 8: BYE ===
With the Rams' win over the Lions and the Titans win over the Jaguars in the same week, the Buccaneers were the NFL's only winless team.

=== Week 9: vs. Green Bay Packers ===
Quarter	1	2	3	4	Total
Packers	14	7	0	7	28
Buccaneers	7	10	0	21	38

at Raymond James Stadium, Tampa, Florida

- Game time: 1:00 p.m. EST
- Game weather: 82 °F (28 °C) (Sunny)
- Game attendance: 62,994
- Referee: Pete Morelli
- TV announcers (Fox): Sam Rosen, Tim Ryan, & Chris Myers

Coming off their bye week, the Buccaneers went home, donned their throwback uniforms, and played a Week 9 duel with the Green Bay Packers. This game would be the first career start for rookie quarterback Josh Freeman.

Tampa Bay would trail early in the first quarter as Packers quarterback Aaron Rodgers completed a 74-yard touchdown pass to wide receiver James Jones. The Buccaneers would get on the board with Freeman finding running back Derrick Ward on a 6-yard touchdown pass, but Green Bay answered with running back Ryan Grant getting a 2-yard touchdown run. In the second quarter, Tampa Bay fired back as cornerback Ronde Barber returned a blocked punt 31 yards for a touchdown, but the Packers replied with Rodgers hooking up with wide receiver Donald Driver on a 32-yad touchdown pass. The Buccaneers would close out the half with kicker Connor Barth booting a 38-yard field goal.

After a scoreless third quarter, Green Bay would strike again in the fourth quarter as Rodgers got a 12-yard touchdown run. Afterwards, Tampa Bay took the lead as Freeman completed a pair of 7-yard touchdown pass to tight end Kellen Winslow (with a failed two-point conversion) and rookie wide receiver Sammie Stroughter (with a successful two-point conversion pass to wide receiver Michael Clayton). The Packers tried to get a comeback, yet safety Tanard Jackson came through with a 35-yard interception return from a touchdown.

With the win, the Buccaneers improved to 1–7.

=== Week 10: at Miami Dolphins ===
Quarter	1	2	3	4	Total
Buccaneers	3	3	3	14	23
Dolphins	6	13	0	6	25

at Land Shark Stadium, Miami Gardens, Florida

- Game time: 1:00 p.m. EST
- Game weather: 80 °F (27 °C) (Sunny)
- Game attendance: 66,085
- Referee: Tony Corrente
- TV announcers (Fox): Ron Pitts, John Lynch, & Laura Okmin

Coming off their home win over the Packers, the Buccaneers flew to Land Shark Stadium for a Week 10 interconference duel with their in-state rival, the Miami Dolphins. In the first quarter, Tampa Bay struck first as kicker Connor Barth got a 51-yard field goal. However, the Dolphins would answer with a 1-yard touchdown run from running back Ronnie Brown (with a blocked PAT). Miami would add onto their lead in the second quarter with a 49-yard field goal from kicker Dan Carpenter. The Buccaneers would reply with Barth's 50-yard field goal, but the Dolphins would take a huge lead as quarterback Chad Henne completed a 5-yard touchdown pass to tight end Kory Sperry, followed by Carpenter getting a 30-yard field goal.

Tampa Bay would get the only score of the third quarter as Barth nailed a 54-yard field goal. The Buccaneers would creep closer in the fourth quarter as rookie quarterback Josh Freeman completed a 33-yard touchdown pass to wide receiver Maurice Stovall, yet Miami continued to have their way as Carpenter booted a 45-yard field goal. Tampa Bay would take the lead as running back Cadillac Williams got a 1-yard touchdown run, but the Dolphins got the last laugh as Carpenter made the game-winning 25-yard field goal.

With the tough loss, the Buccaneers fell to 1–8.

=== Week 11: vs. New Orleans Saints ===
Quarter	1	2	3	4	Total
Saints	7	10	14	7	38
Buccaneers	7	0	0	0	7

at Raymond James Stadium, Tampa, Florida

- Game time: 1:00 p.m. EST
- Game weather: 79 °F (26 °C) (Cloudy)
- Game attendance: 62,720
- Referee: Walt Coleman
- TV announcers (Fox): Sam Rosen & Tim Ryan

=== Week 12: at Atlanta Falcons ===
Quarter	1	2	3	4	Total
Buccaneers	0	10	7	0	17
Falcons	0	10	3	7	20

at Georgia Dome, Atlanta

- Game time: 1:00 PM EST
- Game weather: None (Domed Stadium)
- Game attendance: 67,029
- Referee: Walt Anderson
- TV announcers (Fox): Dick Stockton, Charles Davis & Laura Okmin

Trying to avoid a 3-game losing streak, the Buccaneers flew to Georgia Dome for an NFC South rivalry match against the Atlanta Falcons.

In the first quarter the Bucs trailed early as kicker Jason Elam nailed a 45-yard field goal, and then with QB Chris Redman making a 22-yard touchdown pass to RB Jerious Norwood. Then the Bucs replied with QB Josh Freeman making a 42-yard touchdown pass to WR Antonio Bryant, then kicker Connor Barth made a 39-yard field goal. In the third quarter the Bucs took the lead when Freeman hooked up with Cadillac Williams on an 8-yard touchdown pass. Then the Falcons lost the margin when kicker Jason Elam got a 37-yard field goal. In the final seconds of the fourth quarter the Bucs fell behind when Redman made a 5-yard touchdown pass to WR Roddy White.

With the loss, the Buccaneers fell to 1–10 and stay winless on the road after 5 visits. Additionally, the team was officially eliminated from postseason contention.

=== Week 13: at Carolina Panthers ===
Quarter	1	2	3	4	Total
Buccaneers	0	6	0	0	6
Panthers	10	0	3	3	16

at Bank of America Stadium, Charlotte, North Carolina

- Game time: 1:00 PM EST
- Game weather: 43 °F (6 °C) (Mostly Sunny)
- Game attendance: 72,455
- Referee: Don Carey
- TV announcers (Fox): Ron Pitts & John Lynch

=== Week 14: vs. New York Jets ===
Quarter	1	2	3	4	Total
Jets	6	13	0	7	26
Buccaneers	0	0	3	0	3

at Raymond James Stadium, Tampa, Florida

- Game time: 1:00 PM EST
- Game weather: 73 °F (23 °C) (Sunny)
- Game attendance: 62,731
- Referee: Carl Cheffers
- TV announcers (CBS): Ian Eagle & Rich Gannon

The Jets were without starting quarterback Mark Sanchez, but the Buccaneers were unable to take advantage. The Tampa Bay defense allowed 175 yards rushing, and quarterback Josh Freeman, coming off a five interception game the previous week, struggled to read New York Jets coach Rex Ryan's exotic blitzes. Freeman finishing the day with three interceptions and a passer rating of just 12.1, well below his season average of 59.8.

=== Week 15: at Seattle Seahawks ===
Quarter	1	2	3	4	Total
Buccaneers	0	3	18	3	24
Seahawks	0	7	0	0	7

at Qwest Field, Seattle

- Game time: 4:15 PM EST
- Referee: Mike Carey
- TV announcers (Fox): Ron Pitts, John Lynch & Nischelle Turner

Coming off their home loss to the Jets, the Bucs flew to Qwest Field for a week 15 duel against the Seattle Seahawks. After a scoreless first quarter, Seattle got on the board first with QB Matt Hasselbeck's 29-yard pass to tight end John Carlson. The Bucs got on the board with Connor Barth's 28-yard field goal to end the first half.

In the third quarter, Tampa Bay took the lead after a 45-yard field goal and a 22-yard touchdown pass by QB Josh Freeman to running back Cadillac Williams, set up by a Tanard Jackson interception. The Buccaneers further extended their lead with a 28-yard pass to running back Derrick Ward, with a successful two-point conversion. In the fourth quarter, Barth kicked another field goal for 39 yards. Seattle tried to rally, but Hasselbeck threw an interception (his fourth) in the end zone to cornerback Elbert Mack for a touchback.

With the win, the Buccaneers improved to 2–12. Not only was it their first road win since November 23, 2008, it also marked their first win on the west coast since winning Super Bowl XXXVII in San Diego and their first win in Seattle since 1999.

=== Week 16: at New Orleans Saints ===
Quarter	1	2	3	4	OT	Total
Buccaneers	0	3	0	14	3	20
Saints	14	3	0	0	0	17

at Louisiana Superdome, New Orleans

- Game time: 1:00 PM EST
- Game weather: Dome
- Referee: Jerome Boger
- TV announcers (Fox): Kenny Albert, Daryl Johnston & Tony Siragusa

The Saints dominated the first quarter and entered halftime riding on a 17–3 lead. Tampa Bay scored two touchdowns in the fourth quarter, including a 77-yard kick return by Micheal Spurlock, to tie the game at 17. As time expired, Garrett Hartley attempted a 37-yard field goal that would have salvaged the game for the Saints, but the kick hooked left. In overtime, Tampa Bay won the coin toss, received the kickoff, and drove down the field to win the game with a field goal, for a final score of 20–17.

This was the first time in franchise history that the Bucs defeated the eventual Super Bowl champions.

=== Week 17: vs. Atlanta Falcons ===
Quarter	1	2	3	4	Total
Falcons	0	10	0	10	20
Buccaneers	3	0	0	7	10

at Raymond James Stadium, Tampa, Florida

- Game time: 1:00 PM EST
- Game weather: 44 °F (7 °C) (Cloudy)
- Game attendance: 62,578
- Referee: Gene Steratore
- TV announcers (Fox): Dick Stockton, Charles Davis & Laura Okmin

At 44 °F (7 °C), it was the second-coldest home game in Buccaneers history.

== Scores by quarter ==
	1	2	3	4	OT	Total
Opponents	71	75	57	73	0	276
Buccaneers	24	61	17	72	3	177

== Awards ==
- Week 6: Sammie Stroughter – NFC Special Teams Player of the Week
- Week 9: Clifton Smith – NFC Special Teams Player of the Week
- Week 16: Micheal Spurlock – NFC Special Teams Player of the Week
