= Luke Petitgout =

American football player (born 1976)

No. 77
- Position: Offensive tackle

Personal information
- Born: June 16, 1976 (age 50); Milford, Delaware, U.S.
- Listed height: 6 ft 7 in (2.01 m)
- Listed weight: 330 lb (150 kg)

Career information
- High school: Sussex Central
- College: Notre Dame
- NFL draft: 1999: 1st round, 19th overall pick

Career history
- New York Giants (1999–2006); Tampa Bay Buccaneers (2007)

Awards and highlights
- First-team All-Independent (1998); PFF All-Pro(2006)

Career NFL statistics
- Games played: 117
- Games started: 110
- Fumble recoveries: 4
- Stats at Pro Football Reference

Lucas George Petitgout (born June 16, 1976) is an American former professional football player who was an offensive tackle in the National Football League (NFL). He was selected by the New York Giants 19th overall in the 1999 NFL draft. Petitgout played college football for the Notre Dame Fighting Irish. He also played for the Tampa Bay Buccaneers. Petitgout played a total of nine seasons in the NFL.

== Early life ==
Petitgout attended Sussex Central High School in Georgetown, Delaware, where he played defensive line and tight end for the football team.

== College career ==
Petitgout attended the University of Notre Dame and was a letterman in football. In football, as a senior, he was a Football News All-Independent first-team selection, and registered 74 knockdown blocks.

== Professional career ==
=== New York Giants ===
The New York Giants picked Petitgout in the first round in the 1999 NFL draft, the 19th pick overall.

Thrust into a starting role immediately upon being drafted, Petitgout played left guard and right tackle before settling as the Giants' left tackle in 2002. He was bothered by back problems in 2003 and 2004. He broke his leg midway through the 2006 season. On February 12, 2007, he was released by the Giants.

=== Tampa Bay Buccaneers ===
Petitgout signed with the Tampa Bay Buccaneers in March 2007. Petitgout started out the 2007 season as the Buccaneers' starter at left tackle, but tore his ACL in week 4 against the Carolina Panthers. This injury led to Petitgout being placed on injured reserve, ending his 2007 season. The Bucs released him on August 16, 2008.

== Honors ==
In 2013 he was inducted into the Delaware Sports Hall of Fame.

== Personal life ==
Petitgout was sentenced to jail on December 19, 2015, for 30 days for harassing his ex-wife. According to Court Records, Petitgout's ex-wife has a permanent restraining order against him. He is also estranged from his children and has not had contact with them since 2015.
