= Jovan Haye =

American football player and coach (born 1982)

Vanderbilt Commodores
- Title: Defensive ends coach

Personal information
- Born: June 21, 1982 (age 44); Mandeville, Jamaica
- Listed height: 6 ft 2 in (1.88 m)
- Listed weight: 277 lb (126 kg)

Career information
- High school: Dillard (Fort Lauderdale, Florida, U.S.)
- College: Vanderbilt
- NFL draft: 2005: 6th round, 189th overall pick

Career history

Playing
- Carolina Panthers (2005); Cleveland Browns (2006); Tampa Bay Buccaneers (2006–2008); Tennessee Titans (2009–2010); Detroit Lions (2011); Tampa Bay Buccaneers (2011)

Coaching
- Vanderbilt (2018) Defensive quality control; Vanderbilt (2019–2020) Defensive line coach; Vanderbilt (2021–present) Defensive ends coach

Awards and highlights
- Second-team All-SEC (2003)

Career NFL statistics
- Total tackles: 185
- Sacks: 6.5
- Forced fumbles: 1
- Fumble recoveries: 4
- Pass deflections: 5
- Stats at Pro Football Reference

Jovan Haye (born June 21, 1982) is the defensive ends coach for the Vanderbilt Commodores. A former American football defensive end, Jovan was selected by the Carolina Panthers in the sixth round of the 2005 NFL draft. He played college football at Vanderbilt.

Haye was also a member of the Cleveland Browns, Tampa Bay Buccaneers, Tennessee Titans and Detroit Lions.

== Early life ==
Haye attended high school at Dillard High School in Fort Lauderdale, FL. He did not start playing football until his junior year, but still earned first-team All-State honors at offensive guard as a junior and senior. Aside from his athletic achievements, he also performed well academically, graduating with a 4.5 grade point average.

== College career ==
Jovan Haye played college football at Vanderbilt. During his career he started 34 of 35 games and recorded 149 tackles, 10.5 sacks, and one interception. After his junior season, Haye entered the NFL draft.

== Professional career ==
=== Carolina Panthers ===
Haye was drafted by the Carolina Panthers in the sixth round of the 2005 NFL draft with the 189th overall pick. He only played two games for the Panthers and was cut on September 2, 2006.

=== Cleveland Browns ===
Haye was signed by the Cleveland Browns on September 3, 2006. On September 12, 2006, he was released, but was signed to Browns practice squad on September 14, 2006.

=== Tampa Bay Buccaneers (first stint) ===
Haye was signed by the Tampa Bay Buccaneers on October 25, 2006. In his first season with the Bucs he played in nine games and recorded 17 tackles. In 2007, he became a full time starter for the Bucs, starting all 16 games. He finished the season with 68 tackles and six sacks. In 2008, he started 14 of 15 games, recording 33 tackles and no sacks.

=== Tennessee Titans ===
On March 2, 2009, Haye agreed to a four-year, $16 million contract with the Tennessee Titans. He was waived on August 29, 2011.

=== Detroit Lions ===
On December 9, 2011, Haye signed with the Detroit Lions. Four days later, on December 13, 2011, he was released by the Lions.

=== Tampa Bay Buccaneers (second stint) ===
Haye re-signed with the Buccaneers on December 19, 2011.

== NFL career statistics ==
Legend
**Bold**	Career high

=== Regular season ===
Year	Team	Games		Tackles					Interceptions					Fumbles			
Year	Team	GP	GS	Cmb	Solo	Ast	Sck	TFL	Int	Yds	TD	Lng	PD	FF	FR	Yds	TD
2005	CAR	2	0	0	0	0	0.0	0	0	0	0	0	0	0	0	0	0
2006	TB	9	0	17	11	6	0.0	0	0	0	0	0	0	0	0	0	0
2007	TB	**16**	**16**	**68**	**48**	**20**	**6.0**	**5**	0	0	0	0	**3**	**1**	**4**	**9**	0
2008	TB	15	14	33	25	8	0.0	2	0	0	0	0	1	0	0	0	0
2009	TEN	15	15	32	20	12	0.5	2	0	0	0	0	0	0	0	0	0
2010	TEN	14	1	31	22	9	0.0	1	0	0	0	0	1	0	0	0	0
2011	DET	1	0	2	0	2	0.0	0	0	0	0	0	0	0	0	0	0
2011	TB	1	0	2	2	0	0.0	0	0	0	0	0	0	0	0	0	0
		73	46	185	128	57	6.5	10	0	0	0	0	5	1	4	9	0

=== Playoffs ===
Year	Team	Games		Tackles					Interceptions					Fumbles			
Year	Team	GP	GS	Cmb	Solo	Ast	Sck	TFL	Int	Yds	TD	Lng	PD	FF	FR	Yds	TD
2007	TB	**1**	**1**	**5**	**3**	**2**	0.0	**1**	0	0	0	0	0	0	0	0	0
		1	1	5	3	2	0.0	1	0	0	0	0	0	0	0	0	0

== Coaching career ==
In 2018, Haye was hired by his alma mater, Vanderbilt, to serve as a Defensive Quality Control coach. The following season, he was promoted to coaching the team's defensive line. In 2021 he was retained by Clark Lea and moved to coach the defensive ends.
