= Tanard Jackson =

American football player (born 1985)

No. 28, 36
- Position: Safety

Personal information
- Born: July 21, 1985 (age 41); Silver Spring, Maryland, U.S.
- Listed height: 6 ft 0 in (1.83 m)
- Listed weight: 200 lb (91 kg)

Career information
- High school: Bullis School (Potomac, Maryland)
- College: Syracuse
- NFL draft: 2007: 4th round, 106th overall pick

Career history
- Tampa Bay Buccaneers (2007–2011); Washington Redskins (2012–2014) (Note: Jackson was suspended indefinitely by the NFL in July 2014 and remained on the team's reserve/suspended list until being released in April 2021.)

Career NFL statistics
- Totals tackles: 239
- Sacks: 1.0
- Forced fumbles: 5
- Fumble recoveries: 6
- Interceptions: 10
- Defensive touchdowns: 2
- Stats at Pro Football Reference

Tanard Ricardo Jackson (born July 21, 1985) is an American former professional football player who was a safety in the National Football League (NFL). He played college football for the Syracuse Orange and was selected by the Tampa Bay Buccaneers in the fourth round of the 2007 NFL draft. He was also a member of the Washington Redskins before being suspended indefinitely in July 2014 for being a repeat offender of the NFL's substance abuse policies during his career. Jackson is the only player in NFL history to record an interception against Aaron Rodgers, Drew Brees, Peyton Manning and Tom Brady in his career.

== Early life ==
Jackson played high school football at Bullis School in Potomac, Maryland where he played running back and defensive back. During his senior year, he was named the team's MVP after totaling 1,132 rushing yards, 15 touchdowns, four interceptions, 78 tackles, and two sacks. He finished his career with 252 tackles, a school record 19 interceptions, 3,121 rushing yards, and 39 total touchdowns.

== College career ==
Jackson played his college football at Syracuse University. During his senior season, he was earned All-Big East Conference second-team honors. He finished his career with 165 tackles, 2.5 sacks, 8.5 tackles for loss, and five interceptions.

== Professional career ==
=== Tampa Bay Buccaneers ===
Jackson was selected by the Tampa Bay Buccaneers in the fourth round of the 2007 NFL draft with the 106th overall pick. Although he played cornerback while at Syracuse, the Bucs converted him to a free safety. He started all 16 games during his rookie season, recording 56 tackles, and two interceptions.

On September 22, 2010, he was suspended indefinitely by the NFL for a violation of their substance abuse policy. Because the suspension was Tanard's second violation (he missed the first four games in the previous season due to a violation), he was declared ineligible for reinstatement until September 22, 2011, ending his season after two games and 13 tackles. He was reinstated on October 11, 2011.

On October 14, he was placed on the Buccaneers active roster. He made his season debut two days later against the New Orleans Saints Jackson got a pick in his first game against the Saints at home during Week 6. A second interception came the following week against the Chicago Bears in London.

Jackson was released by the Buccaneers on April 10, 2012, after he failed to pass a physical.

=== Washington Redskins ===
Jackson signed with the Washington Redskins on April 13, 2012. At the start of the training camp, he was placed on the physically unable to perform (PUP) list due to a calf injury. On July 30, 2012, he was cleared by a doctor to practice and taken off the PUP list. On August 31, 2012, Jackson was suspended indefinitely for violating the league's substance policy. After serving a year and a half long suspension, the NFL announced that Jackson would be officially reinstated on May 6, 2014. The Redskins terminated Jackson's contract soon after, however Jackson would re-sign the next day. On July 9, 2014, he was suspended indefinitely for a second time for another violation of the NFL drug policy, and remained on the team's reserve list until being officially released on April 9, 2021.

== NFL career statistics ==
Legend
| **Bold** | Career high |

=== Regular season ===
| Year | Team | Games | | Tackles | | | | | Interceptions | | | | | Fumbles | | | |
| Year | Team | GP | GS | Cmb | Solo | Ast | Sck | TFL | Int | Yds | TD | Lng | PD | FF | FR | Yds | TD |
|---|---|---|---|---|---|---|---|---|---|---|---|---|---|---|---|---|---|
| 2007 | TAM | **16** | **16** | 56 | 53 | 3 | 0.0 | 0 | 2 | 26 | 0 | 26 | **13** | 1 | **3** | **16** | 0 |
| 2008 | TAM | **16** | **16** | 69 | 59 | 10 | **1.0** | 1 | 1 | 25 | 0 | 25 | 3 | **2** | 1 | 0 | 0 |
| 2009 | TAM | 12 | 12 | **71** | **60** | **11** | 0.0 | **3** | **5** | **86** | **2** | 35 | 8 | **2** | 1 | 5 | 0 |
| 2010 | TAM | 2 | 2 | 8 | 8 | 0 | 0.0 | 2 | 0 | 0 | 0 | 0 | 0 | 0 | 0 | 0 | 0 |
| 2011 | TAM | 10 | 10 | 35 | 32 | 3 | 0.0 | 1 | 2 | 59 | 0 | **43** | 3 | 0 | 1 | 13 | 0 |
| | | 56 | 56 | 239 | 212 | 27 | 1.0 | 7 | 10 | 196 | 2 | 43 | 27 | 5 | 6 | 34 | 0 |

=== Playoffs ===
| Year | Team | Games | | Tackles | | | | | Interceptions | | | | | Fumbles | | | |
| Year | Team | GP | GS | Cmb | Solo | Ast | Sck | TFL | Int | Yds | TD | Lng | PD | FF | FR | Yds | TD |
|---|---|---|---|---|---|---|---|---|---|---|---|---|---|---|---|---|---|
| 2007 | TAM | **1** | **1** | **1** | **1** | 0 | 0.0 | 0 | 0 | 0 | 0 | 0 | **1** | 0 | 0 | 0 | 0 |
| | | 1 | 1 | 1 | 1 | 0 | 0.0 | 0 | 0 | 0 | 0 | 0 | 1 | 0 | 0 | 0 | 0 |
