= De'von Hall =

American football player (born 1987)

No. 0, 31
- Position: Safety

Personal information
- Born: September 8, 1987 (age 39); Reseda, California, U.S.
- Listed height: 6 ft 2 in (1.88 m)
- Listed weight: 201 lb (91 kg)

Career information
- High school: Cleveland (Los Angeles)
- College: Utah State
- NFL draft: 2009: undrafted

Career history
- Minnesota Vikings (2009)*; Indianapolis Colts (2009); Tampa Bay Buccaneers (2009)
- * Offseason or practice squad member only

Career NFL statistics
- Tackles: 3
- Sacks: 0
- Interceptions: 0
- Stats at Pro Football Reference

De'von Maurice Hall (born September 5, 1987) is an American former professional football player who was a safety in the National Football League (NFL). He was signed by the Minnesota Vikings as an undrafted free agent in 2009. He played college football for the Utah State Aggies.

Hall has also played for the Indianapolis Colts and Tampa Bay Buccaneers.

Hall was held in a Los Angeles County jail on a charge of murder suspected in the beating killing of his mother in July 2017. He was found not guilty by reason of insanity in February 2020, and was sent to a hospital for treatment.
