= Greg Peterson (American football) =

American football player (born 1984)

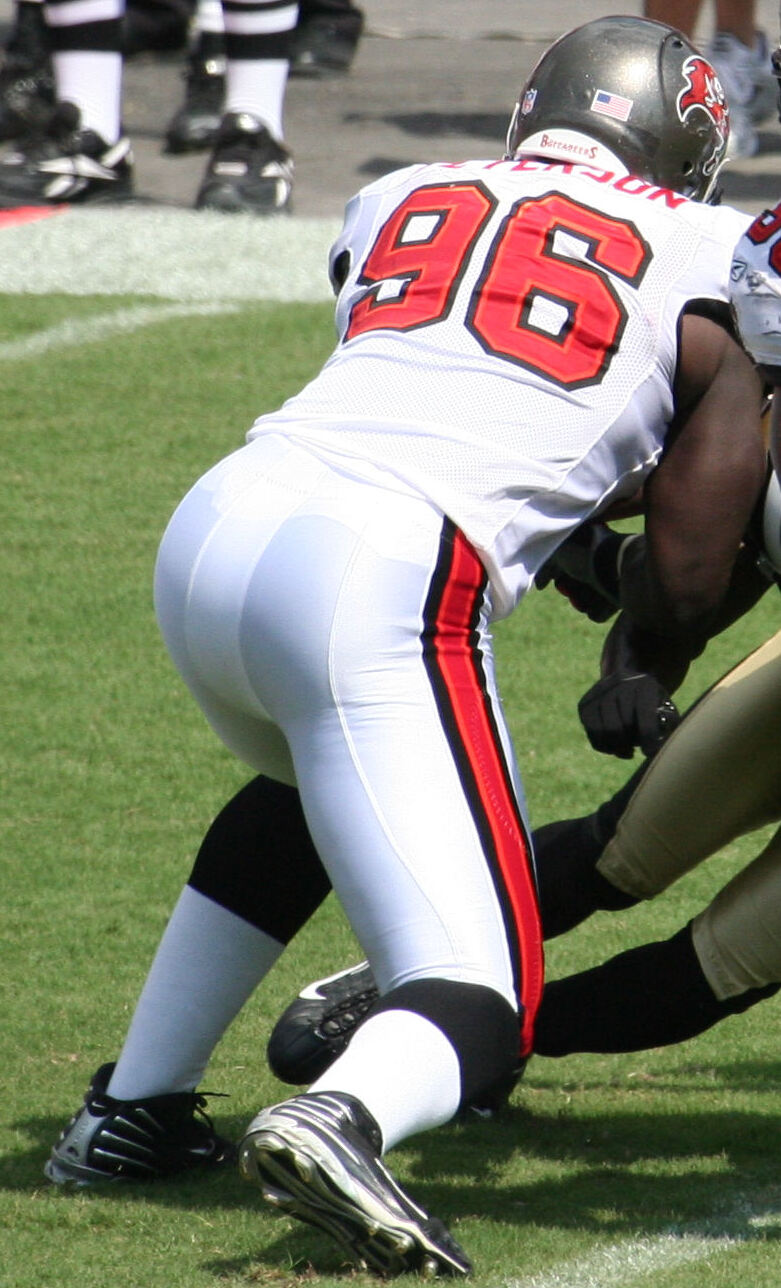
- Peterson with the Buccaneers in 2007

No. 93, 96
- Position: Defensive end

Personal information
- Born: January 21, 1984 (age 42); Kenansville, North Carolina, U.S.
- Listed height: 6 ft 5 in (1.96 m)
- Listed weight: 286 lb (130 kg)

Career information
- High school: East Duplin (Beulaville, North Carolina)
- College: North Carolina Central
- NFL draft: 2007: 5th round, 141st overall pick

Career history
- Tampa Bay Buccaneers (2007–2008); Jacksonville Jaguars (2009); Washington Redskins (2010)*; Hartford Colonials (2011)*; Sacramento Mountain Lions (2011)
- * Offseason or practice squad member only

Career NFL statistics
- Total tackles: 18
- Sacks: 1.5
- Fumble recoveries: 1
- Stats at Pro Football Reference

Greg Peterson (born January 21, 1984) is an American former professional football player who was a defensive end in the National Football League (NFL). He played college football for the North Carolina Central Eagles and was selected by the Tampa Bay Buccaneers in the fifth round of the 2007 NFL draft.

Peterson also played for the Jacksonville Jaguars. Peterson was signed and released during the 2010 off season by the Washington Redskins. He was also a member of the Hartford Colonials and Sacramento Mountain Lions of the United Football League (UFL).

== Early life ==
Peterson played high school football at East Duplin High School in Beulaville, North Carolina. During his senior year, he was named all-conference, all-state, was East Duplin’s Male Athlete of the Year and the teams Most Valuable Player.

== College career ==
Peterson played college football at North Carolina Central University in Durham, North Carolina, after spending two seasons at Hinds Community College in Raymond, Mississippi. During his senior year, he was named a Division II All-American and Sheridan Broadcasting Network Black College All-American. He finished his college career with 104 tackles, 10.5 sacks, three forced fumbles, two fumble recoveries, and one interception.

== Professional career ==
=== Tampa Bay Buccaneers ===
Peterson was selected by the Tampa Bay Buccaneers in the fifth round of the 2007 NFL draft. He recorded his first career sack on September 30, 2007.

He was waived/injured on August 13, 2009 and subsequently reverted to injured reserve. Peterson was released with an injury settlement on August 20.

=== Jacksonville Jaguars ===
Peterson signed with the Jacksonville Jaguars on September 29, 2009.

=== Washington Redskins ===
Peterson signed with the Washington Redskins on April 15, 2010. He was released June 20, 2010.
