= Chris Denman =

American football player (born 1983)

No. 74
- Position: Guard / Tackle

Personal information
- Born: October 7, 1983 (age 43); Tehachapi, California, U.S.
- Listed height: 6 ft 7 in (2.01 m)
- Listed weight: 315 lb (143 kg)

Career information
- High school: Tehachapi
- College: Fresno State
- NFL draft: 2007: 7th round, 214th overall pick

Career history
- Tampa Bay Buccaneers (2007); Buffalo Bills (2008–2009)*; Florida Tuskers (2010)*
- * Offseason or practice squad member only

Awards and highlights
- First-team All-WAC (2007)

Chris Denman (born October 7, 1983) is an American former professional football player who was an offensive lineman in the National Football League (NFL). He played college football for the Fresno State Bulldogs and was selected by the Tampa Bay Buccaneers in the seventh round of the 2007 NFL draft.

Denman was also a member of the Buffalo Bills and Florida Tuskers.

== Early life ==
Denman attended Tehachapi High School in Tehachapi, California and was a student and a letterman in football. In football, he was a starter at both, tight end and defensive end. As a senior, he was an All-League honoree at both positions, and an All-Area selection. Chris Denman graduated from Tehachapi High School in 2002.

== College career ==
Denman played college football at Fresno State.

== Professional career ==
=== Tampa Bay Buccaneers ===
Denman was selected in the seventh round of the 2007 NFL draft by the Tampa Bay Buccaneers. After spending his rookie season on injured reserve, he was released by the Buccaneers on August 30, 2008 during final cuts.

=== Buffalo Bills ===
Denman was signed to the practice squad of the Buffalo Bills on September 8, 2008. He was released on November 12 when the team re-signed cornerback Dustin Fox to the practice squad. The Bills re-signed him to the practice squad on November 19.

After finishing the 2008 season on the Bills' practice squad, Denman was re-signed to a future contract on December 30, 2008. He was waived on September 1.
