= Torrie Cox =

American football player (born 1980)

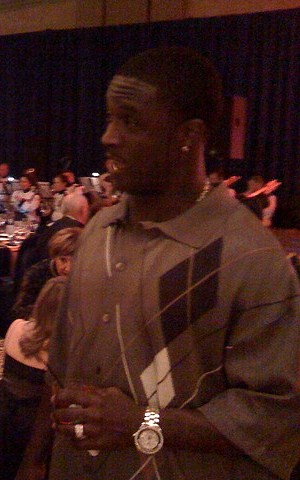
- Cox in 2008

No. 27, 24
- Positions: Cornerback, return specialist

Personal information
- Born: October 29, 1980 (age 46); Miami, Florida, U.S.
- Listed height: 5 ft 10 in (1.78 m)
- Listed weight: 192 lb (87 kg)

Career information
- High school: Miami Northwestern
- College: Pittsburgh
- NFL draft: 2003: 6th round, 205th overall pick

Career history
- Tampa Bay Buccaneers (2003–2009)

Awards and highlights
- First-team All-Big East (2002); First-team All-ECAC (2002)

Career NFL statistics
- Total tackles: 85
- Forced fumbles: 1
- Pass deflections: 5
- Interceptions: 1
- Return yards: 1,758
- Total touchdowns: 1
- Stats at Pro Football Reference

Torrie Tywan Cox (born October 29, 1980) is an American former professional football player who was a cornerback in the National Football League (NFL). He played college football for the Pittsburgh Panthers and was selected by the Tampa Bay Buccaneers in the sixth round of the 2003 NFL draft.

== Early life ==
Cox attended Northwestern High School in Miami, Florida, and was a standout in football. In football, he rushed for over 1,500 yards and won All-City, All-Dade County, and All-State honors.

== College career ==
During college, Torrie Cox was considered one of the hardest hitting defensive backs in the Big East Conference. He earned first-team All-Big East honors and All-ECAC awards in his senior year. Also during his senior year, he played in the East-West Shrine Game. In addition, he earned Pittsburgh's special teams MVP award in his sophomore, junior and senior years. Cox finished his college career with 156 tackles (128 solo tackles), 28 passes defended, three interceptions and three fumble recoveries. On special teams, he returned 65 kickoffs for 1,570 yards (24.2 yards per return) and one touchdown.

== Professional career ==
Cox was selected by the Tampa Bay Buccaneers in the sixth round of the 2003 NFL Draft. In 2003, Cox saw some playing time on special teams and at cornerback in the preseason, but suffered a torn anterior cruciate ligament (ACL) and was forced to injured reserve on August 22 for the rest of the season.

Cox played in 11 games in 2004. His 26.2-yard kick return average ranked fourth in the NFL that season and second in team history. He recorded his first interception return for a touchdown versus the San Francisco 49ers. He finished the 2004 season with eight tackles, one interception and two passes defended; as well as six special teams tackles and one fumble recovery. Cox returned 33 kickoffs for 866 yards. His longest return came against the St. Louis Rams. It was for 59 yards.

In 2005, Cox played in 15 regular season games as well as the postseason loss to the Washington Redskins. He recorded two tackles on defense, and had 19 special teams tackles. He also added one forced fumble. Cox returned 24 kickoffs for 464 yards (19.3 yards per return). His longest return came against the Carolina Panthers. It was for 30 yards.

Cox played in all 16 of the Tampa Bay Buccaneers in 2006. He was tied for first on the team with 20 special teams tackles. He was a first alternate to the Pro Bowl as a special teams player.

Cox was suspended for the first four games of the 2007 season. He had played in four games before suffering a season ending knee injury. The Buccaneers placed Cox on injured reserve on October 31, 2007.

During training camp in July 2008, Cox was again placed on season-ending injured reserve with a torn ACL.

Cox was again placed on injured reserve on November 30, 2009, due to a hip injury. He was released on March 4, 2010.

== Personal life ==
Cox is married to his highschool sweetheart Kawana and they have a son, Torrie Cox Jr., who was born on September 12, 2003, and twins Tyra and Tywan born May 9, 2007.
