= Brian Clark (American football) =

American football player (born 1983)

No. 19, 86, 18 ,87
- Position: Wide receiver

Personal information
- Born: December 26, 1983 (age 42); Jacksonville, Florida, U.S.
- Listed height: 6 ft 2 in (1.88 m)
- Listed weight: 204 lb (93 kg)

Career information
- High school: Tampa (FL) Chamberlain
- College: North Carolina State
- NFL draft: 2006: undrafted

Career history
- Denver Broncos (2006–2007); Tampa Bay Buccaneers (2007–2009); Florida Tuskers (2010); Detroit Lions (2010)

Career NFL statistics
- Receptions: 11
- Receiving yards: 100
- Return yards: 636
- Stats at Pro Football Reference

Brian Clark (born December 26, 1983) is an American former professional football player who was a wide receiver in the National Football League (NFL). He was signed by the Denver Broncos as an undrafted free agent in 2006. He played college football for the NC State Wolfpack.

Clark was also a member of the Tampa Bay Buccaneers, Florida Tuskers, and Detroit Lions.

== Professional career ==
=== Denver Broncos ===
Clark played for the Denver Broncos from 2006 to 2007.

=== Tampa Bay Buccaneers ===
Clark played for the Tampa Bay Buccaneers from 2007 to 2009.

=== Detroit Lions ===
Clark signed with the Detroit Lions on March 8, 2010. He was released on September 4.

=== Florida Tuskers ===
Clark was signed by the Florida Tuskers of the United Football League on November 16, 2010.
