= Andrew Economos =

American football player (born 1982)

No. 48
- Position: Long snapper

Personal information
- Born: June 24, 1982 (age 44); Atlanta, Georgia, U.S.
- Listed height: 6 ft 1 in (1.85 m)
- Listed weight: 250 lb (113 kg)

Career information
- High school: Marist (Atlanta)
- College: Georgia Tech
- NFL draft: 2005: undrafted

Career history
- Jacksonville Jaguars (2005–2006)*; Tampa Bay Buccaneers (2006–2013)
- * Offseason or practice squad member only

Career NFL statistics
- Games played: 108
- Total tackles: 23
- Forced fumbles: 1
- Stats at Pro Football Reference

Andrew John Economos (born June 24, 1982) is an American former professional football player who was a long snapper in the National Football League (NFL). He played college football for the Georgia Tech Yellow Jackets and was signed as an undrafted free agent by the Jacksonville Jaguars in 2005. Economos was also a member of the Tampa Bay Buccaneers.

== Early life ==
Economos graduated from Atlanta's Marist High School and was a letterman in football, basketball, hockey and baseball. In basketball, he led his team to the 2000 Georgia State Championship as a senior.

== College career ==
Economos was a long snapper at Georgia Tech and named to the 2003-2004 ACC Academic Honor Roll. At Tech, he became a member of the Phi Delta Theta fraternity.

== Professional career ==
On April 24, 2005, signed as an undrafted free agent with the Jacksonville Jaguars after he wasn't drafted in the 2005 NFL draft. He was released in 2006 after spending time on the practice squad.

On June 13, 2008, Economos signed a 5-year, $4 million contract to remain with the Buccaneers, who he has been a long snapper since 2006. He snapped for Tampa Bay all of 2007.
