= 2008 Tampa Bay Buccaneers season =

NFL team season

- Owner: Malcolm Glazer
- Head coach: Jon Gruden
- Home stadium: Raymond James Stadium

Results
- Record: 9–7
- Division place: 3rd NFC South
- Playoffs: Did not qualify
- All-Pros: KR Clifton Smith (2nd team)
- Pro Bowlers: 4: CB Ronde Barber; LB Derrick Brooks; G Davin Joseph; KR Clifton Smith

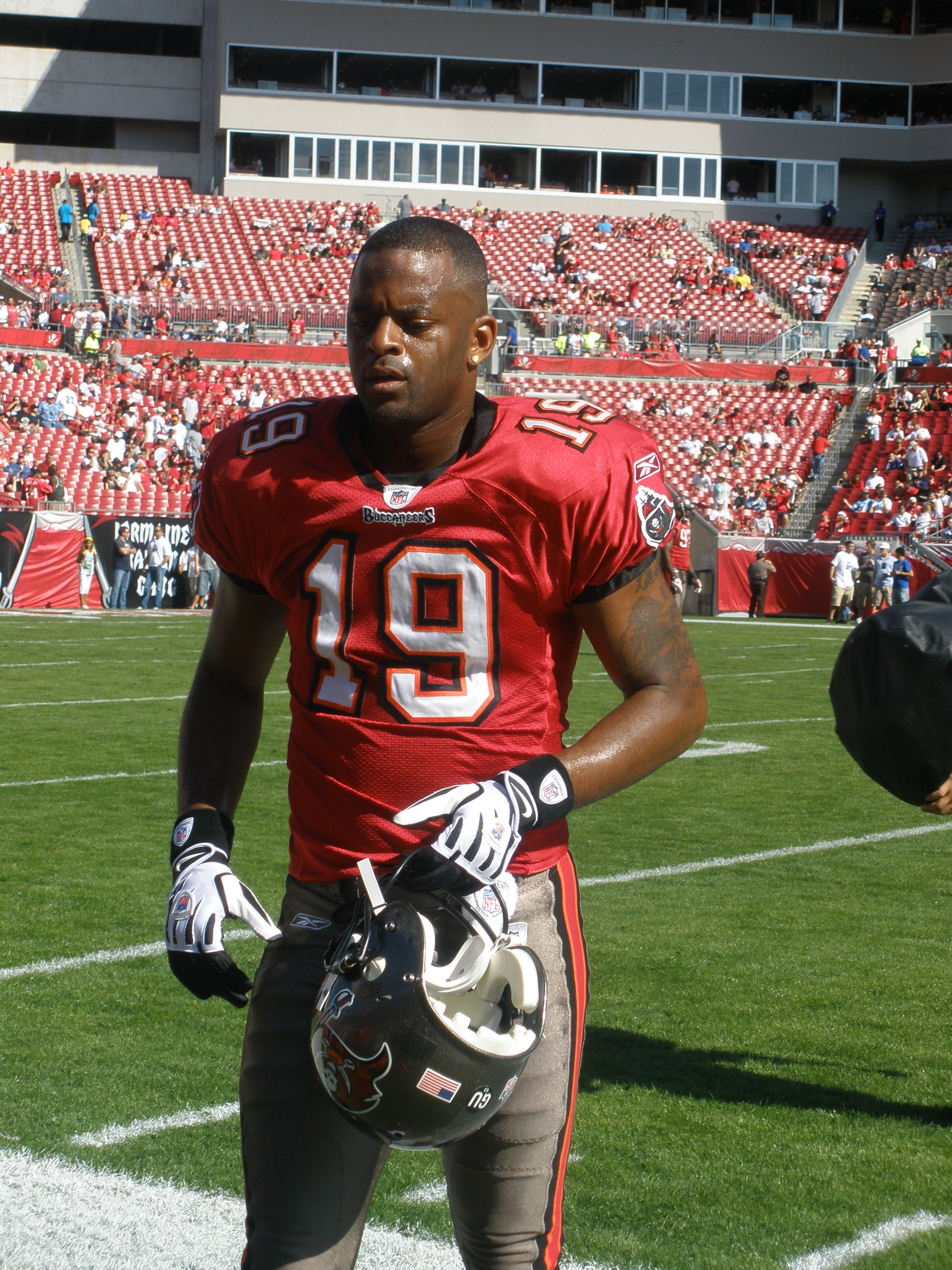

The 2008 season was the Tampa Bay Buccaneers' 33rd in the National Football League (NFL), the 11th playing their home games at Raymond James Stadium, and the seventh and final under head coach Jon Gruden. Though the team finished with a winning record (9–7), they failed to defend their 2007 NFC South championship and did not qualify for the playoffs after finishing the year on a four-game losing streak. Just weeks after the conclusion of the regular season, head coach Jon Gruden was fired, a move that came as a surprise both to sports writers and Gruden himself. General manager Bruce Allen was also fired. It would also be Gruden's last time coaching until 10 years later, when he returned to coach the Oakland Raiders in 2018, whom he previously coached from 1998 to 2001.

This marked the 24th consecutive year in which the Super Bowl did not include the team in whose region or stadium the game was being played in, the last team being the 49ers in 1984. Ironically, the Super Bowl would next be played in the Tampa Bay region in the 2020 NFL season, a game won by the Buccaneers.

== Offseason ==
=== Headlines ===
- On January 23, 2008, the Buccaneers re-signed head coach Jon Gruden and general manager Bruce Allen through the 2011 season.
- Tampa Bay was rumored to lead a list of four teams possibly playing an NFL International Series game in London. They were ultimately not chosen.
- Tampa Bay was one of the teams rumored to be involved with a trade for Brett Favre after he was reinstated to the league from retirement. He ultimately signed with the Jets.

=== Signings ===
The Tampa Bay Buccaneers resigned free agents Michael Bennett (cut November 12), Kevin Carter, Antoine Cash, Sammy Davis, Jerramy Stevens. On June 11, the team settled with estranged quarterback Jake Plummer for $3.5 million.

Free agent acquisitions include former team player Warrick Dunn (Falcons) and Brian Griese (Bears).

=== Selected losses ===
- Brian Kelly
- John Wade
- Matt Lehr
- Anthony Becht
- Mark Jones
- Kalvin Pearson
- Michael Pittman
- Greg Spires
- Bruce Gradkowski
- Ryan Nece
- Chris Simms
- Luke Petitgout
- Anthony Davis

== Summary ==
Tampa Bay's offseason gained attention when they expressed interest in free agent quarterback Brett Favre. After Favre signed with the Jets, tension was reported between head coach Jon Gruden and incumbent quarterback Jeff Garcia. Garcia was recovering from a preseason injury, but was still named the starter. After dropping the season opener, Garcia was benched in favor of Brian Griese.

Griese helped the team to victories in the next three games. With Garcia back as the starter for week 6, the Buccaneers went 6–1 over the next 7 games. At the end of November, Tampa Bay found themselves in first place in the NFC South. They tied a franchise best start of 9–3, were undefeated at home (6–0), and controlled their own destiny for a first-round bye in the playoffs.

The month of December, however, saw the Buccaneers season collapse. A humiliating loss on Monday Night Football against Carolina took away their hopes of a division title. Meanwhile, longtime defensive coordinator Monte Kiffin announced he was leaving to join his son Lane at Tennessee. The defense began to struggle mightily, especially against the run. An overtime loss at Atlanta, followed by two home losses, dropped the Bucs to 9–7, and out of the playoffs. Less than three weeks later, head coach Gruden and general manager Bruce Allen were fired.

== Staff ==
2008 Tampa Bay Buccaneers staff
Front office: Owner/President – Malcolm Glazer; Executive vice president – Bryan Glazer; Executive vice president – Edward Glazer; Executive vice president – Joel Glazer; General manager – Bruce Allen; Director of football operations – Mark Arteaga; Director of pro personnel – Mark Dominik; Head coaches: Head coach – Jon Gruden; Associate head coach/special teams coordinator/running backs – Richard Bisaccia; Assistant head coach – Larry Coyer; Assistant to the head coach/football operations – Paul Kelly; Offensive coaches: Offensive coordinator/offensive line – Bill Muir; Quarterbacks – Greg Olson; Assistant running backs – Tim Berbenich; Wide receivers – Richard Mann; Tight ends – Bob Casullo; Assistant offensive line – George Yarno; Offensive assistant – Jay Gruden; Offensive assistant – Sean McVay	Defensive coaches: Defensive coordinator – Monte Kiffin; Defensive line – Todd Wash; Linebackers – Gus Bradley; Defensive backs – Raheem Morris; Defensive quality control – Johnny Cox; Defensive quality control – Ejiro Evero; Special teams coaches: Special teams quality control – Dwayne Stukes; Strength and conditioning: Head strength and conditioning – Mike Morris; Assistant strength and conditioning – Kurt Schultz

== Roster ==
Tampa Bay Buccaneers 2008 final roster
Quarterbacks: 7 Jeff Garcia; 8 Brian Griese; 11 Josh Johnson; 12 Luke McCown; Running backs: 35 B. J. Askew FB; 33 Jameel Cook FB; 28 Warrick Dunn; 22 Clifton Smith; 24 Cadillac Williams; Wide receivers: 89 Antonio Bryant; 87 Brian Clark; 80 Michael Clayton; 84 Joey Galloway; 19 Ike Hilliard; 10 Dexter Jackson; Tight ends: 88 John Gilmore; 81 Alex Smith; 86 Jerramy Stevens	Offensive linemen: 52 Jeff Faine C; 75 Davin Joseph G; 77 James Lee T; 79 Sean Mahan C/G; 70 Donald Penn T; 78 Arron Sears G; 65 Jeremy Trueblood T; 76 Jeremy Zuttah G; Defensive linemen: 90 Gaines Adams DE; 93 Kevin Carter DE; 94 Patrick Chukwurah DE; 71 Jovan Haye DT; 95 Chris Hovan DT; 96 Greg Peterson DE; 98 Ryan Sims DT; 91 Stylez G. White DE; 97 Jimmy Wilkerson DE/DT	Linebackers: 58 Quincy Black OLB; 55 Derrick Brooks OLB; 57 Adam Hayward MLB; 59 Cato June OLB; 50 Matt McCoy OLB; 51 Barrett Ruud MLB; 56 Rod Wilson OLB; Defensive backs: 26 Will Allen FS; 20 Ronde Barber CB; 31 Phillip Buchanon CB; 36 Tanard Jackson FS; 43 Elbert Mack CB; 30 Donte Nicholson SS; 21 Sabby Piscitelli SS; 25 Aqib Talib CB; Special teams: 9 Josh Bidwell P; 3 Matt Bryant K; 48 Andrew Economos LS	Reserve lists: 27 Torrie Cox CB (IR); 34 Earnest Graham RB (IR); 14 Cortez Hankton WR (IR); 54 Geno Hayes LB (IR); 23 Jermaine Phillips S (IR); 44 Byron Storer FB (IR); 85 Maurice Stovall WR (IR); Practice squad: 39 Kyle Arrington CB; 38 Omar Cuff RB; 32 Greg Fassitt CB; 6 Sergey Ivanov S (IPP); 68 Matt Lentz G; 92 Dre Moore DT; 82 Jason Pociask TE; 17 Micheal Spurlock WR; 74 Julius Wilson T; Rookies in italics 53 active, 7 inactive, 9 practice squad

== 2008 NFL draft ==
2008 Tampa Bay Buccaneers Draft Selections
Draft order		Player name	Position	Height	Weight	College
Round	Choice	Player name	Position	Height	Weight	College
1	20	Aqib Talib	CB	6'1"	206	Kansas
2	58	Dexter Jackson	WR	5'9"	182	Appalachian State
3	83	Jeremy Zuttah	G	6'4"	295	Rutgers
4	115	Dre Moore	DT	6'4"	305	Maryland
5	160	Josh Johnson	QB	6'2"	201	San Diego
6	175	Geno Hayes	LB	6'1"	226	Florida State
7	238	Cory Boyd	RB	6'1"	218	South Carolina

== Preseason ==
Week	Date	Opponent	Result	Record	Venue	Recap
1	August 9	at Miami Dolphins	W 17–6	1–0	Dolphin Stadium	Recap
2	August 17	New England Patriots	W 27–10	2–0	Raymond James Stadium	Recap
3	August 23	Jacksonville Jaguars	L 17–23	2–1	Raymond James Stadium	Recap
4	August 28	at Houston Texans	W 16–6	3–1	Reliant Stadium	Recap

NOTE: Due to NBC's coverage of the 2008 Summer Olympics, two of the Buccaneers' pre-season games were telecast on WTVT as WFLA broadcast the Olympics.

The Tampa Bay Buccaneers held Training Camp at Disney's Wide World of Sports Complex from July 26 through August 14. They played four preseason games, and finished with a record of 3–1.

During the month of July, and into the early stages of training camp, the Buccaneers were one of the teams in the running to sign Brett Favre (who ended his 6-month-long retirement). Favre ultimately signed with the Jets. Meanwhile, starting quarterback Jeff Garcia suffered a calf injury during the first week of camp. Quarterback duties were shared among five players for the preseason, with Garcia named the starter for the regular season. On the final day of cuts, Tampa Bay finally waived quarterback Chris Simms, who had played sparsely since injuring his spleen in week 3 of 2006.

=== Preseason week 1: at Miami Dolphins ===
- Stadium: Dolphin Stadium – Miami Gardens, Florida
- Television (WFLA): Chris Myers, Charles Davis & Dave Reynolds (sideline reporter)
- Summary: Tampa Bay opened their preseason with a 17–6 win against in-state rivals, the Miami Dolphins. Michael Bennett rushed for 74 yards and one touchdown. Quarterback duties were shared amongst four players (McCown, Simms, Griese, and Johnson). No injuries were reported, and the team committed zero penalties.

=== Preseason week 2: New England Patriots ===
- Stadium: Raymond James Stadium – Tampa, Florida
- Television (NFL Network): Fran Charles, Sterling Sharpe and Marshall Faulk
- Summary: Tampa Bay hosted New England in their preseason home opener. A dominating 27–10 performance saw Tampa Bay improve to 2–0 in the preseason. The Buccaneers rushed for 170 yards, led by Michael Bennett, for the second week in a row, with 57. The Buccaneer defense forced 3 turnovers, held the Patriots to only 56 yards rushing, and Sabby Piscitelli recovered and returned a Patriot fumble for a touchdown.

=== Preseason week 3: Jacksonville Jaguars ===
- Stadium: Raymond James Stadium – Tampa, Florida
- Television (WTVT): Chris Myers, Charles Davis & Dave Reynolds (sideline reporter)
- Summary: Tampa Bay fell to their in-state rival Jacksonville 23–17 in their final home game of the preseason. Quarterback Jeff Garcia returned to the starting lineup, and played for a considerable portion of the first half. Three turnovers and a missed field goal, however, put the Buccaneers behind at halftime 10–7. Late in the game, Antoine Cash drove head-first into the side of Marcus Hamilton, injuring both. Cash suffered a neck injury and was removed on a stretcher. In the final minute, Luke McCown drove the Buccaneers to the Jacksonville 9-yard line, hoping for a game-winning touchdown. The ball was turned over on downs, and ended with Jacksonville the victor.

=== Preseason week 4: at Houston Texans ===
- Stadium: Reliant Stadium – Houston, Texas
- Television (WFLA): Chris Myers, Charles Davis & Dave Reynolds (sideline reporter)
- Summary: Tampa Bay wrapped up the preseason with a win against the Houston Texans by a score of 16–6. Josh Johnson and Chris Simms shared quarterback duties and Kenneth Darby led the team in rushing (55 yards). The highlight of scoring was rookie Dexter Jackson's 83-yard punt return touchdown. The Buccaneer defense sacked Houston once, and had one interception. Kicker Matt Bryant finished up a shaky preseason kicking 3-out-of-5 field goals.

== Schedule ==
Week	Date	Opponent	Result	Record	Venue	Recap
1	September 7	at New Orleans Saints	L 20–24	0–1	Louisiana Superdome	Recap
2	September 14	Atlanta Falcons	W 24–9	1–1	Raymond James Stadium	Recap
3	September 21	at Chicago Bears	W 27–24 (OT)	2–1	Soldier Field	Recap
4	September 28	Green Bay Packers	W 30–21	3–1	Raymond James Stadium	Recap
5	October 5	at Denver Broncos	L 13–16	3–2	Invesco Field at Mile High	Recap
6	October 12	Carolina Panthers	W 27–3	4–2	Raymond James Stadium	Recap
7	October 19	Seattle Seahawks	W 20–10	5–2	Raymond James Stadium	Recap
8	October 26	at Dallas Cowboys	L 9–13	5–3	Texas Stadium	Recap
9	November 2	at Kansas City Chiefs	W 30–27 (OT)	6–3	Arrowhead Stadium	Recap
10	Bye					
11	November 16	Minnesota Vikings	W 19–13	7–3	Raymond James Stadium	Recap
12	November 23	at Detroit Lions	W 38–20	8–3	Ford Field	Recap
13	November 30	New Orleans Saints	W 23–20	9–3	Raymond James Stadium	Recap
14	December 8	at Carolina Panthers	L 23–38	9–4	Bank of America Stadium	Recap
15	December 14	at Atlanta Falcons	L 10–13 (OT)	9–5	Georgia Dome	Recap
16	December 21	San Diego Chargers	L 24–41	9–6	Raymond James Stadium	Recap
17	December 28	Oakland Raiders	L 24–31	9–7	Raymond James Stadium	Recap

- In week 16, Tampa Bay vs. San Diego was originally scheduled for 8:15 pm, part of NBC's SNF. However, under the "flex-scheduling" policy, it was moved to 1 p.m.

== Standings ==
NFC South
	W	L	T	PCT	DIV	CONF	PF	PA	STK
^{(2)} Carolina Panthers	12	4	0	.750	4–2	8–4	414	329	W1
^{(5)} Atlanta Falcons	11	5	0	.688	3–3	8–4	391	325	W3
Tampa Bay Buccaneers	9	7	0	.563	3–3	8–4	361	323	L4
New Orleans Saints	8	8	0	.500	2–4	5–7	463	393	L1

== Game summaries ==
=== Week 1: at New Orleans Saints ===
Quarter	1	2	3	4	Total
Buccaneers	7	3	3	7	20
Saints	7	0	10	7	24

at Louisiana Superdome, New Orleans, Louisiana

- Game time: Sunday September 7, 2008 – 1:00 p.m. EDT / 12:00 p.m. CDT
- Game weather: Indoors
- Game attendance: 69,881
- Referee: Alberto Riveron
- TV announcers (Fox): Thom Brennaman, Brian Billick, and Eric Richey (sideline reporter)

The Buccaneers began their 2008 campaign on the road against their NFC South foe, the New Orleans Saints. In the first quarter, Tampa Bay trailed as Saints QB Drew Brees completed a 39-yard TD pass to WR David Patten. The Bucs would respond with CB Phillip Buchanon returning an interception 26 yards for a touchdown. In the second quarter, Tampa Bay took the lead with kicker Matt Bryant getting a 37-yard field goal. In the third quarter, New Orleans would reply with kicker Martín Gramática getting a 34-yard field goal, yet the Buccaneers replied with Bryant nailing a 33-yard field goal. Afterwards, the Saints got their lead back with Brees completing an 84-yard TD pass to WR Devery Henderson. In the fourth quarter, Tampa Bay would go ahead again as QB Jeff Garcia completing a 2-yard TD pass to WR Ike Hilliard. However, New Orleans regained the lead after Brees completing a 42-yard TD pass to RB Reggie Bush.

Inside the final minute, Garcia drove the Buccaneers to the Saints 24-yard line. Facing 4th down & 6, Garcia threw an interception, and the Saints clinched the victory. With the loss, the Buccaneers began their season at 0–1 and lost on opening day for the third straight year.

Scoring summary
Q	Team	Time	Scoring play	Score
1	NO	11:27	39-yard TD pass from Brees to Patten (Gramatica kick)	NO 7-0
1	TB	8:13	Buchanon 26-yard interception return (Bryant kick)	7–7
2	TB	0:03	Bryant 37-yard FG	TB 10–7
3	NO	2:49	Gramatica 34-yard FG	10–10
3	TB	0:33	Bryant 33-yard FG	TB 13–10
3	NO	0:13	84-yard TD pass from Brees to Henderson (Gramatica kick)	NO 17-13
4	TB	10:38	2-yard TD pass from Garcia to Hilliard (Bryant kick)	TB 20–17
4	NO	7:38	42-yard TD pass from Brees to Bush (Gramatica kick)	NO 24-20

=== Week 2: vs. Atlanta Falcons ===
Quarter	1	2	3	4	Total
Falcons	0	3	3	3	9
Buccaneers	7	10	0	7	24

at Raymond James Stadium, Tampa, Florida

- Game time: Sunday September 14, 2008 – 4:05 p.m. EDT
- Game weather: 91° mostly cloudy
- Game attendance: 63,611
- Referee: Jeff Triplette
- TV announcers (Fox): Ron Pitts, Tony Boselli, & Nischelle Turner

Tampa Bay held their home opener facing their second division game, against the Atlanta Falcons. Quarterback Jeff Garcia was inactive due to an ankle injury. However, rumors persisted during the week that the relationship between head coach Jon Gruden and Garcia had broken down after a poor performance the week before, and after preseason distractions due to a nagging injury, and the team's rumored interest in acquiring Brett Favre. Back-up quarterback Brian Griese, who last played at Tampa Bay in 2005, started. Derrick Brooks, who also was nursing injury, was activated and started the game to keep his consecutive games started streak (209) alive.

On the first drive of the game, Atlanta started at their own 23. On the third play of the game, Aqib Talib intercepted Matt Ryan, and returned the ball to the 19. Five plays later, Brian Griese connected with John Gilmore for a 5-yard touchdown.

Early in the second quarter, Tampa Bay started a 12-play, 81-yard drive at their own 19-yard line. On first & goal at the Atlanta 8-yard line, Earnest Graham rushed for an apparent 8-yard touchdown, but it was called back for a holding penalty. After losing ground and facing 3rd & goal at the 17, Warrick Dunn rumbled 17 yards, breaking several tackles for a touchdown. It was Dunn's first score since returning to the team. After a kickoff, Atlanta started their next drive at the 22-yard line. After two incompletions, on third down, Ryan was intercepted by Sabby Piscitelli, who returned the ball to the 17-yard line. Matt Bryant capped off the turnover with a field goal, and a 17–0 lead. Atlanta finally got onto the scoreboard with 12 seconds remaining in the half, with a Jason Elam field goal.

Early in the fourth quarter, Atlanta trailed 17–6. Facing 3rd & 8 at their own 19-yard line, an unusual play occurred. Matt Ryan completed a 20-yard pass to Roddy White. White fumbled, and it was recovered by Sabby Piscitelli of the Buccaneers. Piscitelli then ran 3 yards and attempted a lateral to Cato June. The lateral was actually an illegal forward pass, and fell incomplete to the ground. Thought to be a live ball, it was recovered once more by Atlanta, meanwhile a flag for a personal foul by Tampa Bay was also on the field. After several minutes of confusion and discussion by the officials, they awarded the ball to Atlanta at the Tampa Bay 48-yard line. Atlanta continued the drive and managed a field goal, trimming the lead to 17–9.

Late in the fourth quarter, Earnest Graham iced the game with a 68-yard touchdown run, and a final score of 24–9.

Scoring summary
Q	Team	Time	Scoring play	Score
1	TB	12:37	5-yard TD pass from Griese to Gilmore (Bryant kick)	TB 7–0
2	TB	11:08	Dunn 17-yard TD run (Bryant kick)	TB 14–0
2	TB	9:11	Bryant 33-yard FG	TB 17–0
2	Atl	0:12	Elam 32-yard FG	TB 17–3
3	Atl	1:03	Elam 27-yard FG	TB 17–6
4	Atl	5:12	Elam 24-yard FG	TB 17–9
4	TB	3:08	Graham 68-yard TD run (Bryant kick)	TB 24–9

=== Week 3: at Chicago Bears ===
Quarter	1	2	3	4	OT	Total
Buccaneers	7	7	0	10	3	27
Bears	6	3	8	7	0	24

at Soldier Field, Chicago, Illinois

- Game time: Sunday September 21, 2008 – 1:00 p.m. EDT / 12:00 p.m. CDT
- Game weather: Partly cloudy, 76 °F (24 °C)
- Game attendance: 62,051
- Referee: Tony Corrente
- TV announcers (Fox): Sam Rosen, Tim Ryan, & Chris Myers

In the first quarter, both Tampa Bay and Chicago were fired up and committed several skirmishes. On the second play of the game, Brian Griese's pass was tipped and intercepted by Lance Briggs. The Bears capitalized on the turnover with a field goal. A field position battle saw the Bears kick another field goal, and hold a 6–0 lead early. After the early turnover, Brian Griese led the Buccaneers on an 8-play, 81-yard scoring drive. The drive was capped off by a touchdown pass to Ike Hilliard.

Early in the second quarter, Griese completed a pass to Maurice Stovall, but Stovall fumbled the ball with Chicago recovering at the 38-yard line. Attempting to score quickly, Kyle Orton threw deep to the endzone on the next play. The pass was broken up in the endzone, and bounced into the hands of Barrett Ruud for an improbable interception. The teams traded possessions twice, and the Bears found themselves driving across midfield with about 6 minutes left in the half. After a sack, Orton was again pressured, and threw a screen pass which was intercepted. Gaines Adams returned the ball 45 yards to the goal line, and after review, was awarded a touchdown. The Bears regrouped and drove to their own 44-yard line. On fourth down, a well-executed fake punt resulted in a 38-yard run by Garrett Wolfe. The Bears scored a third field goal as time expired in the half, and Tampa Bay took a 14–9 lead into halftime.

After an interception midway through the third quarter, Chicago scored their first touchdown (and added a two-point conversion) for a 17–14 lead. With less than 7 minutes to go in the fourth quarter, hoping to put the game out of reach, a fourth field goal by Gould put the Bears up by ten points.

Brian Griese drove the Buccaneers 63 yards in 12 plays, and set up a 35-yard field goal by Matt Bryant. The kick narrowed the deficit to 7 points. The Buccaneer defense held Chicago to a 3-and-out, and the Bears punted to Tampa Bay immediately after the two-minute warning. In just over a minute and a half, Griese drove the Buccaneers 81 yards in 11 plays. Jerramy Stevens caught a 1-yard touchdown pass with 10 seconds remaining in regulation to tie the score and force overtime.

In the overtime period, Tampa Bay won the coin toss and received. They quickly drove to the Chicago 39-yard line, but an intentional grounding penalty stalled the drive. Chicago received a punt, but was unable to cross midfield. Brad Maynard punted, and pinned the Buccaneers at their own 7-yard line.

Facing 3rd & 9 at their own 8-yard line, Griese passed to Jerramy Stevens for a short 2-yard gain. The drive, however, was given new life when a skirmish broke out and Charles Tillman of the Bears was called for unnecessary roughness. In seven plays, Griese drove the Buccaneers to the Chicago 44-yard line. With just over 5 minutes left in the overtime period, Griese connected with Antonio Bryant for a 38-yard pass, and a first & goal at the Chicago 6. Two plays later, Matt Bryant came on the field, and kicked a game-winning field goal.

Brian Griese set a franchise record for most pass attempts (67, fourth most in NFL history). His passing yards (407) was the third-most in team history.

Scoring summary
Q	Team	Time	Scoring play	Score
1	Chi	12:43	Gould 40-yard FG	Chi 3–0
1	Chi	6:10	Gould 43-yard FG	Chi 6–0
1	TB	1:50	4-yard TD pass from Griese to Hilliard (Bryant kick)	TB 7–6
2	TB	5:26	Adams 45-yard interception return (Bryant kick)	TB 14–6
2	Chi	0:00	Gould 43-yard FG	TB 14–9
3	Chi	2:54	6-yard TD pass from Orton to Forté (pass successful)	Chi 17–14
4	Chi	6:38	19-yard TD pass from Orton to Lloyd (Gould kick)	Chi 24–14
4	TB	3:11	Bryant 35-yard FG	Chi 24–17
4	TB	0:07	1-yard TD pass from Griese to Stevens (Bryant kick)	24–24
OT	TB	4:21	Bryant 21-yard FG	TB 27–24

=== Week 4: vs. Green Bay Packers ===
Quarter	1	2	3	4	Total
Packers	7	0	7	7	21
Buccaneers	0	13	7	10	30

at Raymond James Stadium, Tampa, Florida

- Game time: Sunday September 28, 2008 – 1:00 p.m. EDT
- Game weather: 81 °F (27 °C) (Cloudy)
- Game attendance: 64,122
- Referee: Terry McAulay
- TV announcers (Fox): Kenny Albert, Daryl Johnston, & Tony Siragusa

Green Bay took the opening drive 58 yards for a touchdown, and the first score of the game. The remainder of the Packers' drives in the first half were largely unsuccessful. On the first play of the second quarter, Aaron Rodgers pass was tipped and then intercepted by Derrick Brooks. The turnover set the Buccaneers up on the Packers 32-yard line. Shortly thereafter, Brian Griese connected to Alex Smith to tie the score at 7.

Later in the second quarter, Green Bay faced 4th & 15 at their own 5-yard line. Derrick Frost punted from the back of the endzone, but the punt took a "Buccaneer bounce" and was downed at the Green Bay 41-yard line. The resulting good field position led to a Matt Bryant field goal, and a 10–7 lead. Earlier in the week, Bryant suffered tragedy off the field, with the death of his 3-month-old son Tryson. Four plays later, Rodgers was intercepted again, this time by Barrett Ruud. Before the end of the second quarter, Bryant kicked another field goal, and the Buccaneers led 13–7 at halftime.

Tampa Bay took the second half kickoff, and drove to the Packers 17-yard line. A play later, however, Griese's pass was bobbled by Michael Clayton at the 5, and intercepted by Tramon Williams. After trading possessions, midway through the third quarter, Green Bay was at their own 40-yard line. Ryan Grant fumbled, and Jermaine Phillips recovered for a 38-yard Buccaneer touchdown.

On the second play of Tampa Bay's next drive, Griese threw his second interception, which was returned to the 42-yard line. Aaron Rodgers threw a 48-yard touchdown pass to Greg Jennings to trim the score to 20–14. Rodgers, however, appeared to injure his throwing arm on the play.

Early in the fourth quarter, Griese threw his second straight interception (and third overall), which was returned 62 yards by Charles Woodson for a touchdown. The Packers took a 21–20 lead with just under 14 minutes to go, while rookie back-up quarterback Matt Flynn took over for the next drive.

With just over 8 minutes remaining, Griese led the Buccaneers on a 10-play, 58-yard drive, capped off by Matt Bryant's third field goal, and a 23–21 lead. Green Bay started with 2:26 remaining. On the drive's second play, Rodgers was intercepted by Gaines Adams. Earnest Graham iced the game with a 47-yard rush, followed by a 1-yard touchdown.

Scoring summary
Q	Team	Time	Scoring play	Score
1	GB	10:24	25-yard TD pass from Rodgers to Jennings (Crosby kick)	GB 7–0
2	TB	12:09	9-yard TD pass from Griese to Smith (Bryant kick)	7–7
2	TB	6:43	Bryant 23-yard FG	TB 10–7
2	TB	1:07	Bryant 36-yard FG	TB 13–7
3	TB	6:00	Phillips 38-yard fumble return (Bryant kick)	TB 20–7
3	GB	1:46	48-yard TD pass from Rodgers to Jennings (Crosby kick)	TB 20–14
4	GB	13:43	Woodson 62-yard interception return (Crosby kick)	GB 21–20
4	TB	2:26	Bryant 24-yard FG	TB 23–21
4	TB	1:56	Graham 1-yard TD run (Bryant kick)	TB 30–21

=== Week 5: at Denver Broncos ===
Quarter	1	2	3	4	Total
Buccaneers	3	3	0	7	13
Broncos	0	6	7	3	16

at Invesco Field at Mile High, Denver, Colorado

- Game time: Sunday October 5, 2008 – 4:05 p.m. EDT / 2:05 p.m. MDT
- Game weather: 70 °F (21 °C) (Partly Cloudy)
- Game attendance: 75,480
- Referee: Walt Anderson
- TV announcers (Fox): Chris Myers, Tim Ryan, & Tom Helmer

The Buccaneers traveled to Denver for the first time since 1996, and lost their second game of the 2008 season. Broncos quarterback Jay Cutler threw for 227 yards and one touchdown.

After trading possessions twice to start the game, Tampa Bay drove 65 yards on 7 plays, taking the lead 3–0. On the next possession, Denver managed to tie the score with a 55-yard field goal.

Later in the second quarter, Denver made a 9-play drive, capped off by a field goal, and a 6–3 lead. Tampa Bay took over with 2:21 left in the half. Brian Griese drove the Buccaneers in 11 plays to the Denver 11-yard line. As time ran out in the half, Matt Bryant kicked another field goal, and the game was tied 6–6 at halftime.

Tampa Bay took the second half kickoff, but was forced to punt. Josh Bidwell pinned the Broncos at their own 4-yard line. On the first play of the drive, however, Cutler connected with Tony Scheffler for 33 yards, and dug themselves out of the hole. The resulting good field possession allowed Denver to punt, and pin Tampa Bay at their own 11. Brian Griese threw an incompletion, and suffered an injured shoulder on the play. Jeff Garcia took over at quarterback.

With a short field, Denver drove 47 yards on only five plays, and took the lead again with a 10-yard touchdown pass by Cutler. They followed up with a field goal early in the fourth quarter, and held a 16–6 lead.

Late in the fourth quarter, Jeff Garcia drove the Buccaneers 90 yards in 13 plays. The drive was capped off with a 7-yard touchdown pass to Ike Hilliard. The touchdown trimmed the deficit to 16–13. Rather than an onside, Tampa Bay elected to squib kick, and Denver recovered. The Broncos managed two first downs, and ran out the clock to secure the victory.

Scoring summary
Q	Team	Time	Scoring play	Score
1	TB	4:28	Bryant 33-yard FG	TB 3–0
2	Den	14:56	Prater 55-yard FG	3–3
2	Den	2:21	Prater 40-yard FG	Den 6–3
2	TB	0:00	Bryant 31-yard FG	6–6
3	Den	5:41	10-yard TD pass from Cutler to Stokley (Prater kick)	Den 13–6
4	Den	12:24	Prater 27-yard FG	Den 16–6
4	TB	2:02	7-yard TD pass from Garcia to Hilliard (Bryant kick)	Den 16–13

=== Week 6: vs. Carolina Panthers ===
Quarter	1	2	3	4	Total
Panthers	0	3	0	0	3
Buccaneers	14	3	3	7	27

at Raymond James Stadium, Tampa, Florida

- Game time: Sunday October 12, 2008 – 1:00 p.m. EDT
- Game weather: 84 °F (29 °C) (Partly Cloudy)
- Game attendance: 64,211
- Referee: Carl Cheffers
- TV announcers (Fox): Matt Vasgersian, Brian Baldinger, & Laura Okmin

Hoping to rebound from their road loss to the Broncos, the Buccaneers went home for a Week 6 NFC South duel with the Carolina Panthers.

Carolina received the opening kickoff, but their opening drive was short-lived. At their own 41-yard line, Jason Baker's punt was blocked, and LB Geno Hayes returned the ball 22 yards for a touchdown, which was the first time that Tampa Bay returned a blocked punt for a touchdown since December 2, 2001 against the Bengals. Later in the first quarter, Jake Delhomme was intercepted by Tanard Jackson at the Carolina 36. Jeff Garcia drove the Buccaneers in five plays for a touchdown, and a 14–0 lead.

Carolina got on the board early in the second quarter, with a 20-yard field goal. The Panthers had 1st & goal at the Tampa Bay 3, and nearly suffered a fumble. After review, the ruling on the field (down by contact) was upheld, and the Pathers trimmed the deficit to 14–3.

On the next drive, Garcia connected deep to Michael Clayton, and a Matt Bryant field goal put the Buccaneers up 17–3. After trading possessions, Carolina was pinned back at their own 6-yard line. Delhomme drove the Panthers into Tampa territory, but was intercepted in the endzone by Jermaine Phillips. The turnover came up short, however, as Bryant missed a field goal to end the half.

Tampa Bay took the second half kickoff. Josh Bidwell punted, and the ball appeared to be downed at the 1-yard line, but officials ruled a touchback. After a replay challenge, the ruling was overturned, and Carolina took over inside their own 1. The poor field position led to another Tampa Bay field goal, and a 20–3 lead. Carolina's next drive went 3-and-out, and a poor punt set up the Buccaneers up at the 41. Jeff Garcia drove the Buccaneers to the 1-yard line, including a 3rd down scramble at the 2. Earnest Graham capped off the drive with a 1-yard touchdown.

All of Carolina's fourth quarter drives came up empty, and Tampa Bay ran out the clock to seal the victory. The win snapped a 5-game losing streak to Carolina at Raymond James Stadium.

With the win, the Buccaneers improved to 4–2.

Scoring summary
Q	Team	Time	Scoring play	Score
1	TB	12:25	Hayes 22-yard blocked punt return (Bryant kick)	TB 7–0
1	TB	2:40	2-yard TD pass from Garcia to Smith (Bryant kick)	TB 14–0
2	Car	12:31	Kasay 20-yard FG	TB 14–3
2	TB	8:58	Bryant 37-yard FG	TB 17–3
3	TB	6:03	Bryant 49-yard FG	TB 20–3
4	TB	14:11	Graham 1-yard TD run (Bryant kick)	TB 27–3

=== Week 7: vs. Seattle Seahawks ===
Quarter	1	2	3	4	Total
Seahawks	0	0	3	7	10
Buccaneers	7	10	0	3	20

at Raymond James Stadium, Tampa, Florida

- Game time: 8:15 p.m. EDT
- Game weather: 75 °F (24 °C) (Clear)
- Game attendance: 64,811
- Referee: Scott Green
- TV announcers (NBC): Al Michaels, Cris Collinsworth, and Andrea Kremer

Tampa Bay appeared on NBC's Sunday Night Football for the first time, and hosted a primetime home game for the first time since 2003. At halftime, festivities were scheduled honoring retired player Mike Alstott.

Seattle took the opening kickoff, but the Buccaneer defense forced a punt. Jeff Garcia led the Buccaneers to a 7–0 lead on their first drive after a 47-yard touchdown pass. Seattle's two other first quarter drives were 3 & outs.

Early in the second quarter, Garcia drove the Buccaneers to the Seattle 4-yard line. Ike Hilliard caught a pass, but was knocked out by a helmet-to-helmet hit. After a replay challenge, it was determined that Hilliard also fumbled the ball. Seattle took over possession, but the drive went 3 & out. Seattle's punt was received by Tampa Bay at their own 41. Garcia quickly drove the Buccaneers to the endzone, with Earnest Graham upping the lead to 14–0.

Justin Forsett returned the ensuing kickoff for Seattle all the way to the Tampa Bay 31. On the first play of the drive, however, Seneca Wallace was intercepted by Aqib Talib. The turnover led to a Matt Bryant field goal and a 17–0 lead. With just over 2 minutes remaining, Seneca Wallace fumbled the center exchange at the snap, and Tampa Bay recovered. As time expired in the half, Matt Bryant attempted a 47-yard field goal into the wind, but it fell short.

Seattle earned good field position early in the third quarter, which led to an Olindo Mare field goal. On their next drive, Maurice Morris broke for a 45-yard rush. The Buccaneer defense stiffened in the red zone, however, and Seattle missed a field goal.

Tampa Bay dominated the fourth quarter, executing a clock-eating, 16-play, 9½-minute drive, culminating with a Matt Bryant field goal and a 20–3 lead. A late touchdown pass by Seattle trimmed the lead to 20–10, but an ensuing onside kick failed. Tampa Bay ran the clock down, and improved to 4–0 at home with the victory.

With the win, the Buccaneers improved to 5–2.

Scoring summary
Q	Team	Time	Scoring play	Score
1	TB	9:13	47-yard TD pass from Garcia to Bryant (Bryant kick)	TB 7–0
2	TB	6:32	Graham 1-yard TD run (Bryant kick)	TB 14–0
2	TB	3:12	Bryant 27-yard FG	TB 17–0
3	Sea	10:21	Mare 26-yard FG	TB 17–3
4	TB	4:34	Bryant 27-yard FG	TB 20–3
4	Sea	1:55	2-yard TD pass from Wallace to Carlson (Mare kick)	TB 20–10

=== Week 8: at Dallas Cowboys ===
Quarter	1	2	3	4	Total
Buccaneers	6	0	3	0	9
Cowboys	0	10	3	0	13

at Texas Stadium, Irving, Texas

- Game time: 1:00 p.m. EDT / 12:00 p.m. CDT
- Game weather: 74 °F (23 °C) (Sunny)
- Game attendance: 63,254
- Referee: Gene Steratore
- TV announcers (Fox): Kenny Albert, Daryl Johnston, & Tony Siragusa

Tampa Bay traveled to Dallas, for what would be their final regular season game at Texas Stadium. Jeff Garcia passed for 227 yards and no interceptions, and the Buccaneer defense held the Cowboys to only 172 yards, but the team fell by a score of 13–9.

With Tony Romo on the sidelines with a broken finger, former Buccaneer Brad Johnson started at quarterback for the Cowboys. Dallas' first three drives went 3-and-out, and Johnson's passing game sputtered. Meanwhile, Jeff Garcia twice drove the Buccaneers into the red zone, and two Matt Bryant field goals put Tampa Bay ahead 6–0.

Dallas got onto the scoreboard in the second quarter with a field goal. On the next drive, Tampa Bay drove 48 yards in 14 plays, but missed a 51-yard field goal. The Cowboys took the good field position, and drove into Tampa Bay territory. With 47 seconds left in the half, facing 3rd & 12 at the 49, the Cowboys' drive appeared to be halted. However, Ronde Barber was called for a horse-collar penalty, and the drive continued. Johnson capitalized on the penalty, and scored a touchdown pass to Roy Williams with 4 seconds left in the half.

Clifton Smith fumbled away the second half kickoff for Tampa Bay, setting up a field position battle in the third quarter. Each team added another field goal, and the score stood at 13–9 late in the fourth quarter. Garcia drove the Buccaneers 56 yards in 16 plays, to the Dallas 18-yard line. Facing 4th & 5 with 19 seconds to go, Garcia's pass fell incomplete, and Dallas held on for the victory.

With the loss, the Buccaneers fell to 5–3.

Scoring summary
Q	Team	Time	Scoring play	Score
1	TB	11:02	Bryant 36-yard FG	TB 3–0
1	TB	1:14	Bryant 36-yard FG	TB 6–0
2	Dal	9:38	Folk 38-yard FG	TB 6–3
2	Dal	0:04	2-yard TD pass from Johnson to Williams kick)	Dal 10–6
3	Dal	5:18	Folk 45-yard FG	Dal 13–6
3	TB	0:39	Bryant 41-yard FG	Dal 13–9

=== Week 9: at Kansas City Chiefs ===
Quarter	1	2	3	4	OT	Total
Buccaneers	0	13	0	14	3	30
Chiefs	14	10	0	3	0	27

at Arrowhead Stadium, Kansas City, Missouri

- Game time: 1:00 p.m. EST / 12:00 p.m. CST
- Game weather: 69 °F (21 °C) (Sunny)
- Game attendance: 74,045
- Referee: Ed Hochuli
- TV announcers (Fox): Ron Pitts, Tony Boselli, & Charissa Thompson

Tampa Bay got off to a slow start as Kansas City took the opening drive 69 yards for a touchdown. On Tampa Bay's first play from scrimmage, Earnest Graham fumbled and the Chiefs recovered. The turnover led to another Kansas City touchdown, and a 14–0 lead.

Early in the second quarter, Tampa Bay drove into the red zone, and scored a field goal. On the following drive, the Chiefs executed a flea-flicker play and quarterback Tyler Thigpen caught an improbable 37-yard touchdown pass. Late in the second quarter, the Chiefs added a field goal, to stretch the lead to 24–3. On the ensuing kickoff, Clifton Smith scored a 97-yard kickoff return touchdown, the second such in franchise history. The Buccaneer defense held the Chiefs to a 3-and-out, and the offense took over with 1:08 to go. As time expired in the half, Matt Bryant's second field goal trimmed the deficit to 24–13.

Neither team scored in the third quarter, and all drives ended in punts. Early in the fourth quarter, Jeff Garcia again drove Tampa Bay into the red zone. Clifton Smith caught a pass, but fumbled at the 13. Kansas City recovered at their own 10. On the very next play, Jamaal Charles fumbled away a pitch in the backfield, and Tampa Bay recovered inside the 3. In a trick play, Jeff Garcia handed off to Earnest Graham, who passed to Alex Smith for a touchdown. A two-point conversion failed, and the score trimmed to 24–19.

With 3:34 to go, the Buccaneers drove to the Kansas City 3, and Earnest Graham appeared to be heading for a potential game-tying score. The ball was fumbled, however, and the Chiefs took over on a touchback. The Buccaneer defense forced a punt, and they took over with 1:50 to go. Jeff Garcia quickly drove the Buccaneers to a 25-yard touchdown, and a two-point conversion catch by Alex Smith sent the game to overtime.

In the overtime period, Tampa Bay won the coin toss. They drove to the Kansas City 15-yard line, and Matt Bryant won the game on a 34-yard field goal. The victory marked the largest comeback (from 21 points behind to win) in franchise history.

With the win, the Buccaneers went into their bye week at 6–3.

Scoring summary
Q	Team	Time	Scoring play	Score
1	KC	8:23	7-yard TD pass from Thigpen to Bowe (Barth kick)	KC 7–0
1	KC	4:51	Smith 1-yard TD run (Barth kick)	KC 14–0
2	TB	13:08	Bryant 25-yard FG	KC 14–3
2	KC	10:19	37-yard TD pass from Bradley to Thigpen (Barth kick)	KC 21–3
2	KC	2:17	Barth 39-yard FG	KC 24–3
2	TB	2:13	Smith 97-yard kickoff return (Bryant kick)	KC 24–10
2	TB	0:04	Bryant 43-yard FG	KC 24–13
4	TB	13:40	3-yard TD pass from Graham to Smith (pass failed)	KC 24–19
4	KC	7:38	Barth 28-yard FG	KC 27–19
4	TB	0:25	24-yard TD pass from Garcia to Bryant (pass successful)	27–27
OT	TB	10:24	Bryant 34-yard FG	TB 30–27

=== Week 11: vs. Minnesota Vikings ===
Quarter	1	2	3	4	Total
Vikings	3	10	0	0	13
Buccaneers	3	3	7	6	19

at Raymond James Stadium, Tampa, Florida

- Game time: 1:00 p.m. EST
- Game weather: Sunny, 62 °F (17 °C)
- Game attendance: 65,278
- Referee: Mike Carey
- TV announcers (Fox): Sam Rosen, Tim Ryan, & Chris Myers

The Tampa Bay defense sacked quarterback Gus Frerotte five times, and kicker Matt Bryant scored four field goals, as the Buccaneers prevailed over the visiting Vikings. Running back Adrian Peterson was held to only 85 yards, and the Vikings lost two fumbles.

On the second play of their first drive, running back Earnest Graham suffered an injured ankle, and sat out the remainder of the game. Both teams traded field goals, and the first quarter was tied 3–3.

Two costly Tampa Bay penalties set the Vikings up at the Tampa Bay 12. Three plays later, a touchdown gave Minnesota a 10–3 lead. On the following drive, Jeff Garcia drove the Buccaneers into Vikings territory. A roughing the passer penalty on Ray Edwards then gave the Buccaneers a 1st & goal at the 3-yard line. A field goal was the result.

Minnesota went on a long field goal drive, and improved their lead to 13–6 at the half.

Tampa Bay's defense took over in the second half. The Buccaneers took the second half kickoff, and Garcia methodically drove the offense into the red zone. At the Minnesota 17-yard line, a series of penalties disrupted the drive. A holding call on Jerramy Stevens pushed them back 10 yards. Antonio Bryant then electrified the crowd with an apparent 27-yard catch and run touchdown. The touchdown, however, was called back for holding. An offsides penalty on Minnesota set up 2nd & 25 at the 32. Garcia connected for a 31-yard pass to Stevens, and the Buccaneers ultimately tied the game at 13–13.

Minnesota's first drive of the third quarter saw them drive to their own 49-yard line. They went for it on a 4th & 1, but failed, turing the ball over on downs. Tampa Bay again drove into Minnesota territory, but Clifton Smith fumbled. The turnover came up empty, however, as the Vikings were forced to punt.

With 14:28 remaining in the fourth quarter, Tampa Bay started a 13-play, 69-yard, drive of almost 9 minutes, capped off by a go-ahead field goal. Maurice Hicks fumbled away the ensuing kickoff, and Tampa Bay scored yet another field goal. Two drives in the final 4 minutes by the Vikings came up empty, a turnover on downs, and a fumble, and Tampa Bay held on to win 19–13.

Scoring summary
Q	Team	Time	Scoring play	Score
1	Min	6:58	Longwell 43-yard FG	Min 3–0
1	TB	2:54	Bryant 39-yard FG	3–3
2	Min	13:40	4-yard TD pass from Frerotte to Wade (Longwell kick)	Min 10–3
2	TB	7:51	Bryant 26-yard FG	Min 10–6
2	Min	1:52	Longwell 37-yard FG	Min 13–6
3	TB	9:33	Askew 1-yard TD run (Bryant kick)	13–13
4	TB	5:41	Bryant 29-yard FG	TB 16–13
4	TB	3:34	Bryant 26-yard FG	TB 19–13

=== Week 12: at Detroit Lions ===
Quarter	1	2	3	4	Total
Buccaneers	0	21	14	3	38
Lions	17	0	3	0	20

at Ford Field, Detroit, Michigan

- Game time: 1:00 p.m. EST
- Game weather: None (Domed Stadium)
- Game attendance: 49,096
- Referee: Bill Carollo
- TV announcers (Fox): Ron Pitts, Tony Boselli, & Charissa Thompson

In the first quarter, the Buccaneers started out flat, and found themselves trailing 17–0 to the winless Detroit Lions. After trading possessions to open the game, quarterback Daunte Culpepper led the Lions on a seven-play touchdown drive to go up 7–0. On the following drive, Jeff Garcia ran into running back Carnell Williams and fumbled the ball. Daniel Bullocks recovered the ball and returned it 44 yards for a touchdown. The Lions added a field goal late in the first quarter, and led 17–0.

Early in the second quarter, Jeff Garcia quickly moved the Buccaneers down the field for their first touchdown. The Lions went three-and-out, and the Buccaneers went on another touchdown drive to trim the deficit to 17–14. Less than two minutes later, Ronde Barber intercepted Daunte Culpepper at the Detroit 24. On the very next play, Garcia connected with Jerramy Stevens, and the Buccaneers took their first lead of the game at 21–17.

On their first possession of the second half, the Lions again went three-and-out. Nick Harris punted, and Clifton Smith returned the punt 70 yards for a touchdown. Later in the third quarter, Ronde Barber intercepted Culpepper for the second time, this time returning the ball for a touchdown. Culpepper was benched and back-up quarterback Drew Stanton stepped in. By the end of the third quarter, the Lions trimmed the deficit to 35–20.

Warrick Dunn broke off a 40-yard run, and a roughing the passer penalty put Tampa Bay in the red zone. An unnecessary roughness penalty, along with Garcia being tripped by him own man, however, forced the Buccaneers to settle for a fourth quarter Matt Bryant field goal.

With 8 minutes remaining, the Lions received a punt and Daunte Culpepper returned to the game. Culpepper's pass was complete to John Standeford, but he fumbled and Tampa Bay recovered. They did not surrender the ball again, and ran out the clock to seal the victory.

Scoring summary
Q	Team	Time	Scoring play	Score
1	Det	6:12	15-yard TD pass from Culpepper to Johnson (Hanson kick)	Det 7–0
1	Det	4:49	Bullocks 44-yard fumble return (Hanson kick)	Det 14–0
1	Det	0:15	Hanson 38-yard FG	Det 17–0
2	TB	11:25	Dunn 13-yard TD run (Bryant kick)	Det 17–7
2	TB	4:48	36-yard TD pass from Garcia to Hilliard (Bryant kick)	Det 17–14
2	TB	3:05	24-yard TD pass from Garcia to Stevens (Bryant kick)	TB 21–17
3	TB	11:49	Smith 70-yard punt return (Bryant kick)	TB 28–17
3	TB	9:14	Barber 65-yard interception return (Bryant kick)	TB 35–17
3	Det	2:47	Hanson 40-yard FG	TB 35–20
4	TB	12:54	Bryant 48-yard FG	TB 38–20

=== Week 13: vs. New Orleans Saints ===
Quarter	1	2	3	4	Total
Saints	3	7	0	10	20
Buccaneers	0	6	14	3	23

at Raymond James Stadium, Tampa, Florida

- Game time: 1:00 p.m. EST
- Game weather: (73 °F (23 °C)) Cloudy, windy, Heavy Rain.
- Game attendance: 64,430
- Referee: Jerome Boger
- TV announcers (Fox): Dick Stockton, Brian Baldinger, Brian Billick and Laura Okmin

New Orleans took the opening kickoff, and quarterback Drew Brees drove the Saints to the Tampa Bay 30-yard line. On a 4th down and 1, however, they were stopped and turned the ball over on downs. At their own 41-yard line, Buccaneers quarterback Jeff Garcia threw an apparent completion, but was intercepted by Jonathan Vilma. The turnover led to a Saints field goal. Midway through the first quarter, heavy rain began to fall.

Tampa Bay took their next possession to the New Orleans 21, and tied the score at 3–3. Late in the second quarter, Clifton Smith returned a New Orleans punt 42 yards to the 39-yard line. The good field position led to a second Matt Bryant field goal. Brees took over with just over two minutes left in the half. He quickly led the Saints on a six-play touchdown drive, and took a 10–6 lead into halftime.

Tampa Bay's opening drive of the third quarter was capped off by an 8-yard touchdown run by Carnell "Cadillac" Williams, his first touchdown since returning to play a week earlier. New Orleans went three-and-out on their next drive, while Tampa Bay stretched their lead moments later with a 39-yard touchdown pass to Antonio Bryant. Looking to answer, Brees was intercepted in the endzone by Cato June.

Early in the fourth quarter, Brees again drove deep into Tampa Bay territory. An apparent interception in the endzone was negated by a penalty, and the drive continued. With new life, Brees connected to Pierre Thomas, and trimmed the deficit to 20–17.

After Tampa Bay was held to two three-and-outs, Josh Bidwell shanked a punt, setting New Orleans up at the Tampa Bay 49-yard line. A field goal tied the score at 20–20 with less than six minutes remaining. With 2:33 to go, Jermaine Phillips intercepted Drew Brees, and returned the ball to the New Orleans 17. Matt Bryant kicked the go-ahead field goal at the two-minute warning. With 1:45 left, Brees was intercepted by Phillip Buchanon to ice the victory.

The win marked head coach Jon Gruden's 100th career NFL victory.

Scoring summary
Q	Team	Time	Scoring play	Score
1	NO	5:44	Hartley 47-yard FG	NO 3-0
2	TB	14:54	Bryant 38-yard FG	3–3
2	TB	2:38	Bryant 23-yard FG	TB 6–3
2	NO	0:40	13-yard TD pass from Brees to Moore (Hartley kick)	NO 10-6
3	TB	10:24	Williams 8-yard run (Bryant kick)	TB 13–10
3	TB	8:45	39-yard TD pass from Garcia to Bryant (Bryant kick)	TB 20–10
4	NO	12:18	20-yard TD pass from Brees to Thomas (Hartley kick)	TB 20–17
4	NO	5:38	Hartley 43-yard FG	20–20
4	TB	2:00	Bryant 37-yard FG	TB 23–20

=== Week 14: at Carolina Panthers ===
Quarter	1	2	3	4	Total
Buccaneers	0	3	14	6	23
Panthers	3	7	7	21	38

at Bank of America Stadium, Charlotte, North Carolina

- Game time: 8:30 p.m. EST
- Game weather: 38 °F (3 °C), mostly cloudy
- Game attendance: 74,113
- Referee: Walt Anderson
- TV announcers (ESPN): Mike Tirico, Ron Jaworski, Tony Kornheiser, Michele Tafoya, & Suzy Kolber

Tampa Bay visited division foe Carolina on Monday Night Football with first place in the NFC South on the line. The Buccaneers went 3-and-out on their first drive, while Carolina scored a field goal for the first points of the game. Late in the first quarter, Tampa Bay drove to the Carolina 22, but Matt Bryant's field goal bounced off the upright no good.

In the second quarter, Jake Delhomme drove the Panthers into Tampa Bay territory. At the 19-yard line, Ronde Barber intercepted. The Buccaneers then drove to the Carolina 1-yard line, but their red zone woes continued. They failed to score a touchdown, and Matt Bryant instead tied the game at 3–3.

DeAngelo Williams rushed for a 40-yard gain late in the second quarter, setting up a Jonathan Stewart touchdown run at the two-minute warning. Carolina took the lead into halftime 10–3.

A penalty on the second half kickoff set Carolina up at their own 7. DeAngelo Williams again broke another long rush (28 yards), and Carolina crossed midfield. Jermaine Phillips made a "circus catch" interception, and the Buccaneers took over at the 47. Two plays later, Jeff Garcia connected to Antonio Bryant for a 50-yard touchdown bomb, tying the score at 10–10. After back-to-back "shootout" touchdowns, the score was tied 17–17 after three-quarters.

In the fourth quarter, the rushing duo of DeAngelo Williams and Jonathan Stewart steamrolled a weary Buccaneers defense. Two touchdowns early in the fourth put the Panthers up 31–17. Garcia attempted to mount a comeback, and led the Buccaneers on an 82-yard touchdown drive. After a blocked extra point, and a failed onside kick, Carolina took over with 2:28 remaining. Facing 3rd down & 4, DeAngelo Williams stymied the Buccaneers with a breakaway 36-yard touchdown run.

Carolina racked up 299 yards rushing, and took over sole possession of first place in the NFC South division.

Scoring summary
Q	Team	Time	Scoring play	Score
1	Car	8:53	Kasay 33-yard FG	Car 3–0
2	TB	6:37	Bryant 20-yard FG	3–3
2	Car	1:59	Stewart 2-yard run (Kasay kick)	Car 10–3
3	TB	11:34	50-yard TD pass from Garcia to Bryant (Bryant kick)	10–10
3	Car	8:28	38-yard TD pass from Delhomme to Smith (Kasay kick)	Car 17–10
3	TB	3:37	Williams 4-yard run (Bryant kick)	17–17
4	Car	13:27	Stewart 4-yard run (Kasay kick)	Car 24–17
4	Car	8:38	Williams 16-yard run (Kasay kick)	Car 31–17
4	TB	2:36	15-yard TD pass from Garcia to Bryant (kick blocked)	Car 31–23
4	Car	2:17	Williams 36-yard run (Kasay kick)	Car 38–23

=== Week 15: at Atlanta Falcons ===
Quarter	1	2	3	4	OT	Total
Buccaneers	0	7	0	3	0	10
Falcons	10	0	0	0	3	13

at Georgia Dome, Atlanta, Georgia

- Game time: 1:00 pm EDT
- Game weather: None (Domed Stadium)
- Game attendance: 65,045
- Referee: Terry McAulay
- TV announcers (Fox): Dick Stockton, Brian Baldinger, & Laura Okmin

Quarterback Jeff Garcia, as well as Cato June, sat out of the game with injuries, and Brian Griese started for the Buccaneers. Penalties and defense dominated the game, a key matchup in the NFC South playoff race.

Leading 10–0 in the second quarter, Matt Ryan threw deep to the endzone, but was intercepted by Aqib Talib. On Atlanta's nxt drive, Ronde Barber intercepted Ryan, setting the Buccaneers up at the 33-yard line. With 15 seconds remaining in the half, Brian Griese connected for a 20-yard touchdown pass to Antonio Bryant.

Midway through the third quarter, Matt Ryan completed a pass to Jason Rader, who ran for the endzone. Before he crossed the goal line, however, Jermaine Phillips punched the ball from his grasp, and it was recovered in the endzone by Tampa Bay. The Buccaneers' ensuing possession, however, came up empty, as Griese himself was intercepted past midfield.

The next five possessions by both teams resulted in punts. In an attempt to tie the score with 3:43 remaining, Matt Bryant's field goal sailed wide left. The Falcons were held to a 3-and-out, and lined up for a punt with 2:37 to go. Michael Koenen's punt was blocked, and Sabby Piscitelli returned it to the 22. After driving to the 9-yard line, the Buccaneers settled for a game-tying field goal, and forced overtime.

In overtime, the Buccaneers won the toss, but were forced to punt. With just over 4 minutes remaining in the overtime period, Jason Elam kicked a game-winning field goal for the Falcons.

Scoring summary
Q	Team	Time	Scoring play	Score
1	Atl	6:53	Elam 26-yard FG	Atl 3–0
1	Atl	3:46	Turner 1-yard TD run (Elam kick)	Atl 10–0
2	TB	0:15	20-yard TD pass from Griese to Bryant (Bryant kick)	Atl 10–7
4	TB	0:48	Bryant 38-yard FG	10–10
OT	Atl	4:08	Elam 34-yard FG	stadium=l 13–10

=== Week 16: vs. San Diego Chargers ===
Quarter	1	2	3	4	Total
Chargers	7	13	0	21	41
Buccaneers	7	3	14	0	24

at Raymond James Stadium, Tampa, Florida

- Game time: 1:00 p.m. EST
- Game weather: Sunny, 72 °F (22 °C)
- Game attendance: 64,778
- Referee: Peter Morelli
- TV announcers (CBS): Greg Gumbel & Dan Dierdorf

Tampa Bay hosted San Diego, with both teams alive for playoff contention. With quarterback Jeff Garcia back in the lineup, the Buccaneers drove into San Diego territory early in the first quarter. At the 36-yard line, an Antonio Bryant fumble was recovered by San Diego. Philip Rivers quickly led San Diego down the field for their first score. On the ensuing kickoff, Clifton Smith returned the ball 72 yards to the San Diego 11-yard line. Four plays later, B. J. Askew tied the score at 7–7.

Trailing 17–7 late in the second quarter, Tampa Bay drove to the San Diego 31, where Matt Bryant kicked a field goal with 22-second left in the half. A quick 25-yard pass by Rivers, however, allowed Nate Kaeding to kick a 57-yard field goal, and take a 20–10 lead into halftime.

Tampa Bay took the second half kickoff, and Garcia led the Buccaneers on a long scoring drive. After a scramble to the 7, Garcia scrambled once more for a 7-yard touchdown run. On their next possession, Garcia connected deep to a wide-open Antonio Bryant for a 71-yard touchdown. The third quarter ended with Tampa Bay leading 24–20.

The fourth quarter saw Tampa Bay's hope fizzle. Two touchdowns by the Chargers, and a Garcia interception saw the Buccaneers trailing 34–24 with time running out. With less than 7 minutes to go, Garcia found himself scrambling again, this time for a 7-yard first down run. Quentin Jammer slammed into Garcia's helmet, and Garcia began to bleed visibly from him nose and forehead. Driving across midfield with just over 3 minutes to go, Garcia was intercepted by Antoine Cason, who returned the ball 59 yards for the game-icing touchdown.

With the loss, their first home defeat of the season, the Buccaneers failed to secure a playoff berth. A win in week 17 against the Raiders, coupled with a loss by Dallas, would have been required for Tampa Bay to qualify for the playoffs.

Scoring summary
Q	Team	Time	Scoring play	Score
1	SD	5:14	11-yard TD pass from Rivers to Manumaleuna (Kaeding kick)	SD 7–0
1	TB	2:44	Askew 1-yard run (Bryant kick)	7–7
2	SD	13:37	15-yard TD pass from Rivers to Gates (Kaeding kick)	SD 14–7
2	SD	5:37	Kaeding 28-yard FG	SD 17–7
2	TB	0:22	Bryant 49-yard FG	SD 17–10
2	SD	0:04	Kaeding 57-yard FG	SD 20–10
3	TB	7:47	Garcia 7-yard run (Bryant kick)	SD 20–17
3	TB	5:19	71-yard TD pass from Garcia to Bryant (Bryant kick)	TB 24–20
4	SD	14:53	5-yard TD pass from Rivers to Gates (Kaeding kick)	SD 27–24
4	SD	7:29	32-yard TD pass from Rivers to Sproles (Kaeding kick)	SD 34–24
4	SD	3:13	Cason 59-yard interception return (Kaeding kick)	SD 41–24

=== Week 17: vs. Oakland Raiders ===
Quarter	1	2	3	4	Total
Raiders	0	14	0	17	31
Buccaneers	0	7	7	10	24

at Raymond James Stadium, Tampa, Florida

- Game time: 1:00 p.m. EST
- Game weather: Sunny, 77 °F (25 °C)
- Game attendance: 64,847
- Referee: Ron Winter
- TV announcers (CBS): Kevin Harlan & Rich Gannon

Tampa Bay concluded the 2008 regular season against the Oakland Raiders, coach Jon Gruden's former team, and the team they beat in Super Bowl XXXVII. Tampa Bay needed a victory, and a loss by Dallas to clinch a wild card playoff berth.

The first quarter was a defensive battle, with both teams struggling to cross midfield. Early in the second quarter, Johnnie Lee Higgins returned a punt for Oakland to the Tampa Bay 40. Michael Bush scored a touchdown run, the first rushing touchdown given up by the Buccaneers at home, to give Oakland a 7–0 lead. Jeff Garcia followed up with a 10-play, 80-yard drive, including a 29-yard pass to Michael Clayton.

Both teams started the third quarter with 3-and-out drives. On the next drive Jeff Garcia connected for a 25-yard pass to Carnell "Cadillac" Williams, then a 58-yard bomb to Clayton for a touchdown. Nearing the end of the third quarter, Tampa Bay again went on a long scoring drive, capping it off with a Matt Bryant field goal, and a 17–14 lead.

With 12:25 remaining, JaMarcus Russell was intercepted by Sabby Piscitelli at the 5-yard line. Piscitelli returned the ball 84 yards to the Oakland 11. Two plays later "Cadillac" Williams was in the endzone for his second touchdown of the day.

A pass interference call on Will Allen moved Oakland to the Tampa Bay 12-yard line, and led to a Raiders touchdown. Leading 24–21 with just under 10 minutes to go, Tampa Bay looked to run the clock out. "Cadillac" Williams rumbled for 28 yards, but fell with an apparent serious knee injury, the second of his career. Tampa Bay ultimately turned the ball over on downs at the Oakland 33. On the very next play, Michael Bush busted through the Buccaneer defense to score a go-ahead, 64-yard touchdown run. After a Jeff Garcia interception, and a late Oakland field goal, the Buccaneers fell to the Raiders 31–24, and thus once again the home team hosting the Super Bowl will not play in it, having failed to even make the post-season.

With the loss, Tampa Bay's season ended at 9–7. Head coach Jon Gruden and General manager Bruce Allen were fired January 16, 2009.

Scoring summary
Q	Team	Time	Scoring play	Score
2	Oak	10:44	Bush 4-yard run (Janikowski kick)	Oak 7–0
2	TB	5:45	Williams 9-yard run (Bryant kick)	7–7
2	Oak	0:35	3-yard TD pass from Russell to Schilens (Janikowski kick)	Oak 14–7
3	TB	10:14	58-yard TD pass from Garcia to Clayton (Bryant kick)	14–14
4	TB	14:56	Bryant 29-yard FG	TB 17–14
4	TB	11:35	Williams 8-yard run (Bryant kick)	TB 24–14
4	Oak	10:00	12-yard TD pass from Russell to Higgins (Janikowski kick)	TB 24–21
4	Oak	7:16	Bush 64-yard run (Janikowski kick)	Oak 28–24
4	Oak	1:13	Janikowski 25-yard FG	Oak 31–24

== Awards and achievements ==
- Week 4: NFC Defensive Player of the Week – Derrick Brooks
- Week 4: NFC Special Teams Player of the Week – Matt Bryant
- Week 6: NFC Rookie of the Week- Geno Hayes
- Week 7: SNF "Horse Trailer" Player of the Game – Jeff Garcia
- Week 9: NFC Special Teams Player of the Week – Clifton Smith
- Week 12: NFC Defensive Player of the Week – Ronde Barber
- NFC Special Teams Player of the Month (November) – Clifton Smith
- 2009 Bart Starr Award – Warrick Dunn

=== Pro Bowl selections ===
- Derrick Brooks
- Clifton Smith
- Ronde Barber (added January 13 as a first alternate)
- Davin Joseph (added January 13 as a first alternate)
