= 2005 Tampa Bay Buccaneers season =

NFL team season

- Owner: Malcolm Glazer
- Head coach: Jon Gruden
- Home stadium: Raymond James Stadium

Results
- Record: 11–5
- Division place: 1st NFC South
- Playoffs: Lost Wild Card Playoffs (vs. Redskins) 10–17
- All-Pros: 3: CB Ronde Barber; OLB Derrick Brooks; P Josh Bidwell (2nd team)
- Pro Bowlers: 3: CB Ronde Barber; P Josh Bidwell; OLB Derrick Brooks
- Team MVP: RB Cadillac Williams
- Team ROY: RB Cadillac Williams

The 2005 Tampa Bay Buccaneers season was the franchise's 30th season in the National Football League (NFL), the 8th playing their home games at Raymond James Stadium, and the 4th under head coach Jon Gruden. The season began with the team trying to improve on their 5–11 record in 2004; they made a complete reversal from last season by going 11–5, clinching their first winning season, playoff appearance and division title since 2002. Cadillac Williams won Offensive Rookie of the Year. The Buccaneers would lose in the Wild Card playoff game at home to end the season.

== Summary ==
In the 2005 season, the Bucs returned to their winning ways. The Buccaneers selected Carnell "Cadillac" Williams in the first round of the 2005 draft, and the rookie would provide a running game the Buccaneers hadn't possessed since the days of James Wilder Sr. in the 1980s. Williams set the NFL record for most yards rushing in his first three games with 474, and was named as the AP's 2005 Offensive Rookie of the Year. His shoes and gloves from the third game of the season are now on display in the Pro Football Hall of Fame.

With their 2005 campaign marking the Buccaneers' 30th Season in the NFL, the team won their first four games before entering losing a couple while starting QB Brian Griese was lost for the year with an injury during a win over the Miami Dolphins. Chris Simms struggled early as the Bucs lost games to the San Francisco 49ers and Carolina Panthers, but Simms played better and helped Tampa Bay beat the Washington Redskins in a 36–35 thriller to break that slump. In a gutsy move, Gruden went for the win with a two-point conversion plunge by fullback Mike Alstott. A booth review of that play was inconclusive, and Redskins coach Joe Gibbs stated after the game his belief that Alstott had not scored.

The Buccaneers followed up with important wins over their NFC South division rivals, sweeping both the New Orleans Saints and Atlanta Falcons, as well as defeating the Panthers in a rare victory at Carolina. Even with a tough loss against the Chicago Bears and a humiliating shutout against the New England Patriots, the Bucs finished 11–5 and won the NFC South by virtue of a tie-breaker over the Panthers. The Buccaneers' 30th Anniversary season would end on a sour note, as they lost 17–10 at home to the Redskins in the wild-card round. An apparent late Bucs touchdown pass from Chris Simms to Edell Shepherd could have tied the game, but the play was ruled incomplete when a booth review upheld the referee's decision.

The Buccaneers sent three veteran players to the 2006 Pro Bowl, including cornerback Ronde Barber and punter Josh Bidwell. Outside linebacker Derrick Brooks was named the Pro Bowl MVP, with a 59-yard interception return for a touchdown.

== Staff ==
2005 Tampa Bay Buccaneers staff
Front office: Owner/President – Malcolm Glazer; General manager – Bruce Allen; Head coaches: Head coach – Jon Gruden; Assistant head coach/defensive line – Rod Marinelli; Assistant to the head coach/football operations – Paul Kelly; Offensive coaches: Offensive coordinator/offensive line – Bill Muir; Quarterbacks – Paul Hackett; Running backs – Art Valero; Wide receivers – Richard Mann; Tight ends/assistant special teams – Ron Middleton; Senior assistant – Aaron Kromer; Offensive assistant – Jay Gruden; Offensive assistant – Chris Wiesehan; Offensive quality control – Kyle Shanahan	Defensive coaches: Defensive coordinator – Monte Kiffin; Linebackers – Joe Barry; Defensive backs – Mike Tomlin; Assistant defensive backs – Raheem Morris; Defensive quality control – Joe Woods; Special teams coaches: Special teams coordinator – Rich Bisaccia; Strength and conditioning: Director of player development – Cedric Saunders; Strength and conditioning coordinator – Garrett Giemont; Assistant strength and conditioning – Mike Morris

== Roster ==
2005 Tampa Bay Buccaneers roster
Quarterbacks (QB): 12 Luke McCown; 13 Tim Rattay; 2 Chris Simms; Running backs (RB): 40 Mike Alstott FB; 43 Jameel Cook FB; 33 Earnest Graham; 32 Michael Pittman; 22 Derek Watson; 24 Cadillac Williams; Wide receivers (WR): 80 Michael Clayton; 84 Joey Galloway; 19 Ike Hilliard; 89 Mark Jones; 86 Edell Shepherd; Tight ends (TE): 88 Anthony Becht; 85 Will Heller; 81 Alex Smith	Offensive linemen (OL): 72 Dan Buenning G; 61 Chris Colmer OT; 69 Anthony Davis OT; 74 Scott Jackson C/G; 79 Sean Mahan G; 75 Todd Steussie OT; 77 Jeb Terry G; 76 John Wade C; 67 Kenyatta Walker OT; Defensive linemen (DL): 91 Jon Bradley DT; 64 Anthony Bryant DT; 95 Chris Hovan DT; 92 Anthony McFarland DT; 97 Simeon Rice DE; 94 Greg Spires DE; 90 Dewayne White DE; 96 Ellis Wyms DE	Linebackers (LB): 55 Derrick Brooks OLB; 58 Marquis Cooper OLB; 54 Wesly Mallard OLB; 56 Ryan Nece OLB; 53 Shelton Quarles MLB; 51 Barrett Ruud MLB; Defensive backs (DB): 46 Blue Adams CB; 26 Will Allen S; 20 Ronde Barber CB; 21 Juran Bolden CB; 27 Torrie Cox CB; 25 Brian Kelly CB; 34 Dexter Jackson FS; 28 Donte Nicholson SS; 39 Kalvin Pearson FS; 23 Jermaine Phillips SS; Special teams (ST): 9 Josh Bidwell P; 3 Matt Bryant K; 83 Dave Moore LS	Practice squad: 16 Larry Brackins WR; 52 Antoine Cash MLB; 62 Jonathan Clinkscale G; 29 James Patrick CB; 73 Stefan Rodgers OT; 87 J. R. Russell WR; 82 Paris Warren WR; 99 Andrew Williams DE; Reserve: 50 Jeff Gooch OLB (IR); 8 Brian Griese QB (IR); -- Jeff Hatch OT (IR); 78 Matt Stinchcomb OT (IR); Rookies in italics 53 active, 4 reserve, 8 practice squad

== Schedule ==
Week	Date	Opponent	Result	Record	Game site	NFL.com recap
1	September 11	at Minnesota Vikings	W 24–13	1–0	Hubert H. Humphrey Metrodome	Recap
2	September 18	Buffalo Bills	W 19–3	2–0	Raymond James Stadium	Recap
3	September 25	at Green Bay Packers	W 17–16	3–0	Lambeau Field	Recap
4	October 2	Detroit Lions	W 17–13	4–0	Raymond James Stadium	Recap
5	October 9	at New York Jets	L 12–14	4–1	The Meadowlands	Recap
6	October 16	Miami Dolphins	W 27–13	5–1	Raymond James Stadium	Recap
7	Bye					
8	October 30	at San Francisco 49ers	L 10–15	5–2	Monster Park	Recap
9	November 6	Carolina Panthers	L 14–34	5–3	Raymond James Stadium	Recap
10	November 13	Washington Redskins	W 36–35	6–3	Raymond James Stadium	Recap
11	November 20	at Atlanta Falcons	W 30–27	7–3	Georgia Dome	Recap
12	November 27	Chicago Bears	L 10–13	7–4	Raymond James Stadium	Recap
13	December 4	at New Orleans Saints	W 10–3	8–4	Tiger Stadium	Recap
14	December 11	at Carolina Panthers	W 20–10	9–4	Bank of America Stadium	Recap
15	December 17	at New England Patriots	L 0–28	9–5	Gillette Stadium	Recap
16	December 24	Atlanta Falcons	W 27–24 (OT)	10–5	Raymond James Stadium	Recap
17	January 1	New Orleans Saints	W 27–13	11–5	Raymond James Stadium	Recap

== Game summaries ==
=== Week 1 at Minnesota Vikings ===
Rookie Cadillac Williams rushed for 148 yards, including a game-clinching 71-yard touchdown run with 1:23 remaining. Starting quarterback Brian Griese threw touchdowns to Alex Smith. Tampa Bay snapped a four-game losing streak dating back to the 2004 season.

=== Week 2 Buffalo Bills ===
Tampa Bay dominated the visiting Bills on a steamy 91° afternoon, with Cadillac Williams rushing for 128 yards and one touchdown.

=== Week 3 at Green Bay Packers ===
Tampa Bay won for the first time at Lambeau Field since 1989, led by Cadillac Williams's 158 rushing yards. Williams went over 100 yards for the first three games, totaling an NFL record 434 yards for a rookie's first three starts. A missed extra point by Green Bay early in the game proved to be the deciding margin.

=== Week 4 Detroit Lions ===
Tampa Bay led 17–13 late in the game as Detroit drove to the Tampa Bay 12-yard line. An apparent game-winning touchdown pass from Joey Harrington to Marcus Pollard was called for an instant replay review. After review, the play was ruled incomplete, as Pollard was out-of-bounds, and Tampa Bay held on to win, and improve to 4–0. Cadillac Williams was held to just 13 yards, and suffered a hamstring injury.

=== Week 5 at New York Jets ===
Tampa Bay lost their first game of the season to the Jets, due in part to injuries to Cadillac Williams and Michael Clayton. Several penalties and missed opportunities led to the defeat.

=== Week 6 Miami Dolphins ===
Tampa Bay returned to their winning ways, but quarterback Brian Griese was lost for the season with a knee injury.

=== Week 8 at San Francisco 49ers ===
Chris Simms was named starting quarterback, but despite a 78-yard touchdown pass to Joey Galloway, the Buccaneers offense sputtered, and fell by a score of 15–10.

=== Week 9 Carolina Panthers ===
Chris Simms threw two interceptions, one returned for a touchdown, in a 34–14 loss at home to division rival Carolina.

=== Week 10 Washington Redskins ===
Tampa Bay broke their two-game losing streak with a shootout victory against the Washington Redskins. Trailing 28–35 with one minute to go, Chris Simms connected with Edell Shepherd for a 30-yard touchdown pass. As the teams lined up for the game-tying extra point, a Washington defender flinched and prompted a delay-of-game penalty. The five-yard penalty was applied to the ensuing kickoff. As the two teams lined up for the second attempt at the extra point, two Washington defenders jumped offsides and blocked Matt Bryant's extra point kick. The play was ruled dead, and officials enforced a penalty half the distance to the goal line. The ball was placed at the 1-yard line for yet another conversion attempt. Tampa Bay sent the offensive unit back on the field, and decided this time, to attempt a two-point conversion. Fullback Mike Alstott hit the pile up the middle, but a second effort allowed him to cross the goal line and Tampa Bay took a 36–35 lead. Officials called for an instant replay, but the video evidence was inconclusive, and the play was upheld.

=== Week 11 at Atlanta Falcons ===
With 1:55 left, Cadillac Williams tied the game 27–27 with a 9-yard touchdown run. Derrick Brooks then sacked Michael Vick, and forced a fumble, which was recovered by Shelton Quarles. With 42 seconds remaining, Matt Bryant kicked a game-winning 45-yard field goal.

=== Week 12 Chicago Bears ===
Matt Bryant missed a game-tying 29-yard field goal with under three minutes to go, and Tampa Bay fell to the visiting Bears 13–10.

=== Week 13 at New Orleans Saints ===
New Orleans hosted Tampa Bay at Tiger Stadium. The game was relocated from the Louisiana Superdome due to Hurricane Katrina. The Tampa Bay defense dominated, and the Buccaneers came away with a 10–3 victory, a key intra-division win.

=== Week 14 at Carolina Panthers ===
With 11:47 remaining in the fourth quarter, Ronde Barber intercepted Jake Delhomme, which set up a Carnell Williams touchdown. The Buccaneers held on to win 20–10, breaking a five-game losing streak to Carolina, evened the season series 1–1, and moved into a tie for the NFC South lead.

=== Week 15 at New England Patriots ===
The Buccaneers suffered their worst shutout since 1999, falling 28–0 to New England. Chris Simms was sacked seven times in the defeat. For Gruden, it was his first loss to the Patriots since the Tuck Rule Game in 2001 and it would be the last time he coached against the Patriots until the 2020 season, this time as the head coach of the Raiders.

=== Week 16 Atlanta Falcons ===
Tampa Bay and Atlanta met on Christmas Eve with playoff berths for both teams at stake. The game turned into a shootout, and Atlanta led 24–17 late in the fourth quarter. Facing 4th down and 1, and trailing by 7, Cadillac Williams scored a 6-yard touchdown run with 31 seconds remaining. In overtime, Tampa Bay won the coin toss and elected to receive. Edell Shepherd, however, fumbled the opening kickoff, and Atlanta recovered at the Buccaneers' 18-yard line. Fans began to leave the stadium as Atlanta lined up for a chip shot 20 yard game-winning field goal attempt. Todd Peterson's field goal was blocked by Dewayne White, and Tampa Bay recovered. Fans were seen scrambling back to their seats as the Buccaneer's hopes for victory were still alive.

Tampa Bay quickly drove to the Atlanta 9-yard line, and lined up for a game-winning field goal try. Matt Bryant's kick sailed wide left, though, and the game continued. Both teams traded punts, then Atlanta punted to Tampa Bay with 1:08 remaining in overtime. Tampa Bay drove to the 23-yard line, and avoided a tie when Bryant connected on a 41-yard game-winning field goal with 15 seconds left in the overtime period.

Meanwhile, Dallas defeated Carolina 24–20, which meant that a win by Tampa Bay in week 17 would clinch the NFC South title.

=== Week 17 New Orleans Saints ===
The Buccaneers swept the New Orleans Saints 27–13 with DeWayne White stripping the ball for a sack, fumble recovery which he took back 34 yards for the clinching touchdown] for the season, It clinched the 2005 NFC South title and made the Buccaneers a third seed for the playoffs. The Bucs beat out Carolina who was also 11-5 because their 5-1 NFC South record was better than Carolina's 4–2 record.

== Playoffs ==
Playoff Round	Date	Opponent (seed)	Result	Record	Game site	NFL.com recap
Wild card	January 7, 2006	Washington Redskins (6)	L 10–17	0–1	Raymond James Stadium	N/A

=== NFC Wild Card Playoff: Washington Redskins ===
	1	2	3	4	Total
Redskins	14	3	0	0	17
Buccaneers	0	3	7	0	10

at Raymond James Stadium, Tampa, Florida

- Game time: 4:30 p.m. EST
- Game weather: 52 °F (11 °C) (Clear, cool, breezy)
- TV announcers (ABC): Mike Patrick (play-by-play), Joe Theismann and Paul Maguire (color commentators), Suzy Kolber (field reporter)
- Referee: Mike Carey
- Game Attendance: 65,514

Although the Redskins gained only 120 yards on offense, the lowest total in NFL playoff history for a winning team, they converted two turnovers into touchdowns. Midway through the first quarter, Washington linebacker LaVar Arrington's 21-yard interception return set up running back Clinton Portis' six-yard touchdown run. Then, Redskins linebacker Marcus Washington recovered Tampa Bay running back Carnell Williams' fumble and returned it seven yards before losing it himself – into the arms of Safety Sean Taylor who then ran 51 yards for the Redskins' second touchdown.

Early in the second quarter, Tampa Bay drove 38 yards to the Redskins 24-yard line where Matt Bryant kicked a 43-yard field goal to cut their deficit to 14–3. The Redskins responded with a 10-play, 40-yard drive and scored with 40-yard field goal from John Hall.

In the third quarter, Mark Jones gave the Buccaneers good field position by returning a punt 24 yards to the 49-yard line. Tamp Bay's offense took full advantage of the return, marching on a seven-play, 51-yard drive that ended with quarterback Chris Simms' two-yard touchdown run. In the fourth quarter, Tampa Bay drove to the Redskins 19-yard line, but Washington made a huge stand. First, linebacker Lemar Marshall tackled fullback Mike Alstott for no gain on third down and 1, and then Simms threw an incomplete pass on fourth down.. However, Buccaneers cornerback Brian Kelly gave his team another chance to drive for the tying touchdown by intercepting a pass from Mark Brunell and returning it the Redskins 35-yard line. With 3 minutes left in the game, Tampa Bay wide receiver Edell Shepherd caught what appeared to be a 35-yard touchdown reception, but he lost control of the ball as he was coming down in the end zone. The Buccaneers got one last chance to tie the game when they received a punt at their own 46-yard line with 1:05 left in regulation, but Simms threw a pass that was tipped at the line of scrimmage and went into the arms of Washington for an interception.

This game was widely regarded by commentators as an "ugly" performance by both teams' offenses, rendering it a largely defensive game.

Scoring

First quarter

- WAS – Portis 6 run (Hall kick), 8:40. Redskins 7–0. Drive: 1 play, 6 yards, :05.
- WAS – Taylor 51 fumble return (Hall kick), Redskins 14–0.

Second quarter'

- TB – FG Bryant 43, 4:15. Redskins 14–3. Drive: 11 plays, 38 yards, 5:28.
- WAS – FG Hall 47, 10:02. Redskins 17–3. Drive: 10 plays, 40 yards, 4:28.

Third quarter

- TB – Simms 2 run (Bryant kick), 9:40. Redskins 17–10. Drive: 7 plays, 51 yards, 3:23.

Fourth quarter

- No scoring plays

== Standings ==
NFC South
	W	L	T	PCT	DIV	CONF	PF	PA	STK
^{(3)} Tampa Bay Buccaneers	11	5	0	.688	5–1	9–3	300	274	W2
^{(5)} Carolina Panthers	11	5	0	.688	4–2	8–4	391	259	W1
Atlanta Falcons	8	8	0	.500	2–4	5–7	351	341	L3
New Orleans Saints	3	13	0	.188	1–5	1–11	235	398	L5
