= Will Allen (safety) =

American football player (born 1982)

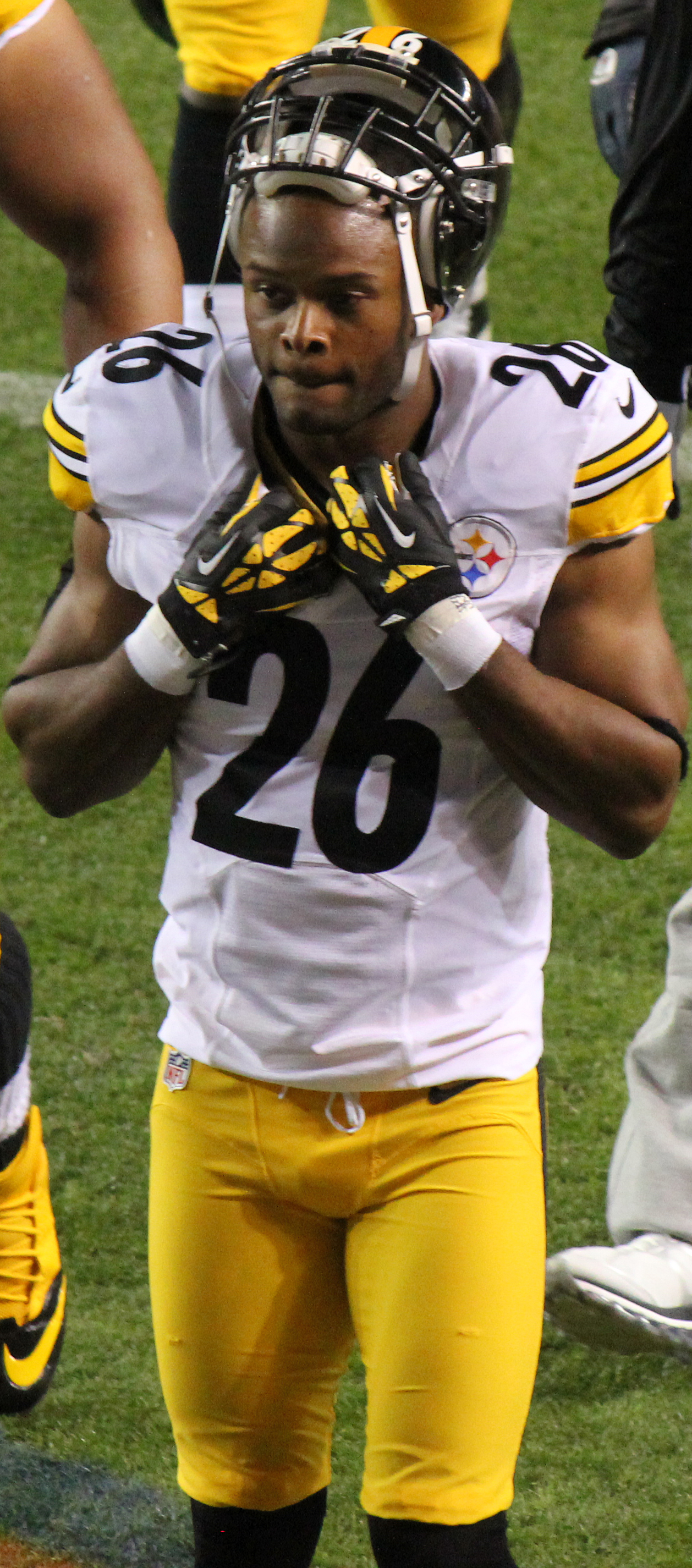
- Allen with the Pittsburgh Steelers in 2012

No. 26, 20, 37
- Position: Safety

Personal information
- Born: June 17, 1982 (age 44); Dayton, Ohio, U.S.
- Listed height: 6 ft 1 in (1.85 m)
- Listed weight: 202 lb (92 kg)

Career information
- High school: Wayne (Huber Heights, Ohio)
- College: Ohio State
- NFL draft: 2004: 4th round, 111th overall pick

Career history
- Tampa Bay Buccaneers (2004−2009); Pittsburgh Steelers (2010−2012); Dallas Cowboys (2013); Pittsburgh Steelers (2013−2015)

Awards and highlights
- BCS national champion (2002); Consensus All-American (2003); First-team All-Big Ten (2003)

Career NFL statistics
- Total tackles: 416
- Sacks: 4
- Forced fumbles: 7
- Fumble recoveries: 6
- Interceptions: 7
- Defensive touchdowns: 1
- Stats at Pro Football Reference

Will Allen (born June 17, 1982) is an American former professional football player who was a safety in the National Football League (NFL). Allen played college football for the Ohio State Buckeyes, earning consensus All-American honors in 2003. He was selected in the fourth round of the 2004 NFL draft by the Tampa Bay Buccaneers and also played for the Dallas Cowboys and Pittsburgh Steelers.

== Early life ==
Allen was born in Dayton, Ohio. He attended Wayne High School in Huber Heights, Ohio, and played high school football for the Wayne Warriors. He was a member of Wayne High School's 1999 Division I State Runner-Up team, along with fellow Ohio State recruit John Hollins. His high school jersey number, #4, is the only number that has been officially retired by Wayne High School. Allen was named all-Ohio Division I first team by the Associated Press for his senior season. He was rated as the 4th defensive back prospect and the 27th overall prospect in the Midwest by Super Prep, and rated as the 53rd defensive back prospect in the country by Rivals100.com.

== College career ==
Allen received an athletic scholarship to attend Ohio State University, where he was a four-year letterman for coach Jim Tressel's Ohio State Buckeyes football team from 2000 to 2003. As a senior in 2003, he was a first-team All-American selection by consensus. In his first three seasons at Ohio State, he played behind three-time All-American Mike Doss, primarily in nickel coverage on passing downs.

Allen is remembered among college football fans for two plays made during the 2002 BCS National Championship season. The first occurred during the 2002 Ohio State-Michigan game, when he intercepted a pass from Michigan quarterback John Navarre during the closing seconds to preserve the 14–9 victory and an undefeated regular season. The second play was one game later in the 2003 Fiesta Bowl for the national championship game. In the second half, Allen tackled Miami running back Willis McGahee and delivered a shoulder blow to his left knee. McGahee had to be helped off the field; he suffered ligament damage and was forced to miss his entire rookie year in the National Football League.

== Professional career ==
Pre-draft measurables
Height	Weight	Arm length	Hand span	40-yard dash	20-yard shuttle	Three-cone drill	Vertical jump	Broad jump
6 ft 0 1/2 in (1.84 m)	202 lb (92 kg)	31 7/8 in (0.81 m)	9 in (0.23 m)	4.58 s	4.25 s	7.06 s	36.0 in (0.91 m)	9 ft 7 in (2.92 m)
All values from NFL Combine/Pro Day

=== Tampa Bay Buccaneers ===
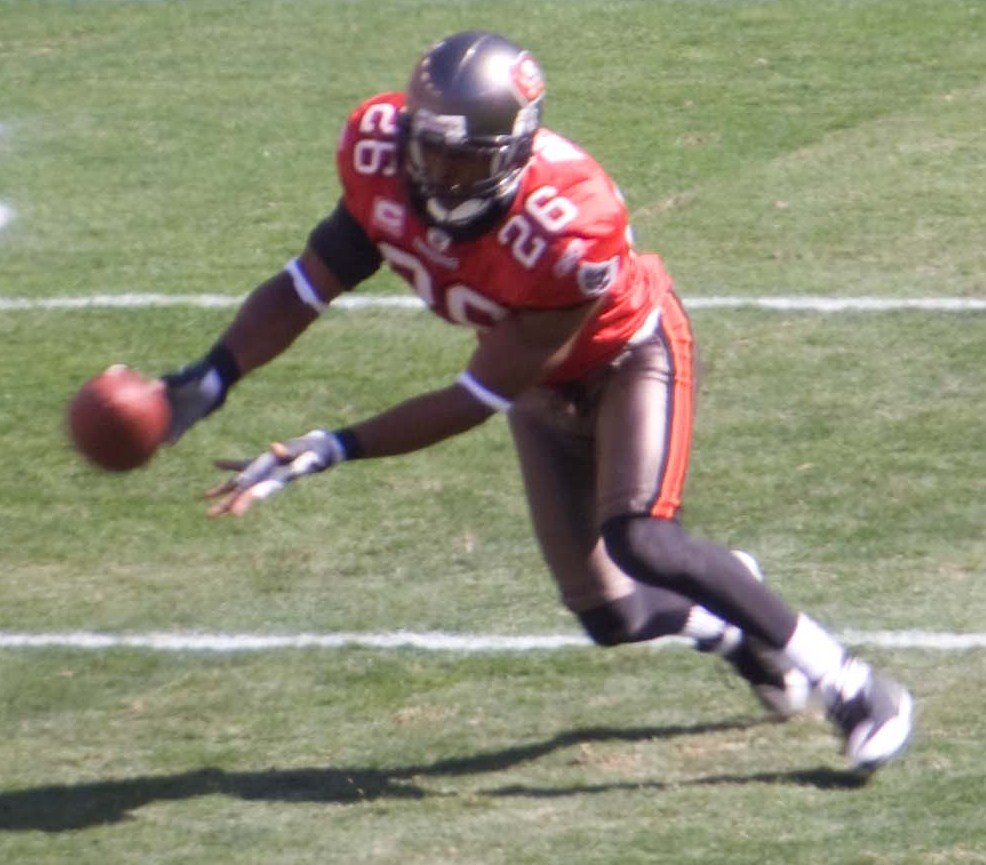
Allen during his tenure with the Tampa Bay Buccaneers.

Allen played in every game in his rookie year on special teams but saw increasing time as a safety in the final weeks of the season. He made his first NFL interception against the Carolina Panthers and his first touchdown in week 6 of the following season against the Miami Dolphins. He started eight games in 2005, playing both free safety and strong safety due to injuries to Jermaine Phillips and Dexter Jackson.

Allen's most noted contribution in his NFL career occurred against the Green Bay Packers in 2005, when he intercepted Packers quarterback Brett Favre twice in the fourth quarter. Buccaneers starting safety, Dexter Jackson, had been injured midway through the second quarter with a hamstring strain, and Allen came into the game as a substitute. Allen was the Buccaneers' special teams captain in 2008. He was the first alternate for the National Football League Special Teams for the 2009 Pro Bowl. He was re-signed to a 1-year $2.35 million contract on February 28, 2009.

=== Pittsburgh Steelers (first stint) ===
On March 8, 2010, Allen signed with the Pittsburgh Steelers. On November 9, 2012, Allen was fined $7,875 for a late hit against New York Giants receiver Victor Cruz in Week 9.

=== Dallas Cowboys ===
On March 27, 2013, Allen signed a one-year, $840,000 contract with the Dallas Cowboys. The deal included a $65,000 signing bonus. He was released on October 8, 2013.

=== Pittsburgh Steelers (second stint) ===
Allen returned to the Steelers in October 2013. He signed a 1-year $1,020,000 contract, then another $1,050,000 contract with the Steelers the following year.

== NFL career statistics ==
Legend
**Bold**	Career high

=== Regular season ===
Year	Team	Games		Tackles					Interceptions					Fumbles			
Year	Team	GP	GS	Cmb	Solo	Ast	Sck	TFL	Int	Yds	TD	Lng	PD	FF	FR	Yds	TD
2004	TAM	**16**	0	16	14	2	0.0	0	1	0	0	0	2	1	0	0	0
2005	TAM	13	8	49	34	15	0.0	2	**3**	26	0	26	4	0	1	33	**1**
2006	TAM	**16**	**16**	77	56	**21**	0.0	3	0	0	0	0	1	0	0	0	0
2007	TAM	15	0	19	17	2	0.0	0	0	0	0	0	0	0	**2**	0	0
2008	TAM	**16**	0	20	15	5	0.0	0	0	0	0	0	0	1	1	0	0
2009	TAM	8	2	20	16	4	0.0	0	0	0	0	0	1	0	0	0	0
2010	PIT	14	0	12	11	1	0.0	0	0	0	0	0	0	0	1	0	0
2011	PIT	**16**	0	9	6	3	0.0	0	0	0	0	0	0	0	0	0	0
2012	PIT	**16**	7	35	20	15	0.0	0	0	0	0	0	3	1	0	0	0
2013	DAL	5	2	9	5	4	0.0	0	1	13	0	13	3	0	0	0	0
2013	PIT	12	0	34	25	9	0.0	2	1	**27**	0	**27**	1	1	1	**49**	0
2014	PIT	**16**	4	36	22	14	0.0	2	0	0	0	0	0	1	0	0	0
2015	PIT	13	13	**80**	**62**	18	**4.0**	**5**	1	20	0	20	**8**	**2**	0	0	0
		176	52	416	303	113	4.0	14	7	86	0	27	23	7	6	82	1

=== Playoffs ===
Year	Team	Games		Tackles					Interceptions					Fumbles			
Year	Team	GP	GS	Cmb	Solo	Ast	Sck	TFL	Int	Yds	TD	Lng	PD	FF	FR	Yds	TD
2005	TAM	1	0	1	0	**1**	0.0	0	0	0	0	0	0	0	0	0	0
2007	TAM	1	0	1	1	0	0.0	0	0	0	0	0	0	0	0	0	0
2010	PIT	**2**	0	1	1	0	0.0	0	0	0	0	0	0	0	0	0	0
2011	PIT	1	0	0	0	0	0.0	0	0	0	0	0	0	0	0	0	0
2014	PIT	1	0	0	0	0	0.0	0	0	0	0	0	0	0	0	0	0
2015	PIT	**2**	**2**	**9**	**9**	0	0.0	**3**	0	0	0	0	**1**	0	0	0	0
		176	52	416	303	113	4.0	14	7	86	0	27	23	7	6	82	1

== The Will Allen Foundation ==
The Will Allen Foundation was created in May 2008 with the goal to inspire youth in under-resourced communities to succeed by providing necessary tools. It mainly operates in Dayton, Ohio; Tampa, Florida; and Pittsburgh, Pennsylvania. The foundation's Quest for Real Life Success program aims to provide students with real life experience and expose them to new opportunities.
