= Antonio Bryant =

American football player (born 1981)

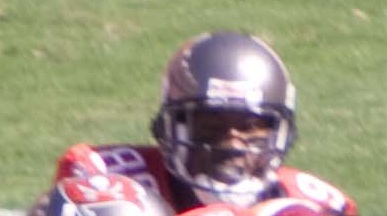
- Bryant with the Tampa Bay Buccaneers in 2009

No. 88, 81, 89
- Position: Wide receiver

Personal information
- Born: March 9, 1981 (age 45); Miami, Florida, U.S.
- Listed height: 6 ft 1 in (1.85 m)
- Listed weight: 205 lb (93 kg)

Career information
- High school: Miami Northwestern
- College: Pittsburgh (1999–2001)
- NFL draft: 2002: 2nd round, 63rd overall pick

Career history
- Dallas Cowboys (2002–2004); Cleveland Browns (2004–2005); San Francisco 49ers (2006); Tampa Bay Buccaneers (2008–2009); Cincinnati Bengals (2010)*; Seattle Seahawks (2012)*
- * Offseason or practice squad member only

Awards and highlights
- PFWA All-Rookie Team (2002); Biletnikoff Award (2000); Consensus All-American (2000); Big East Co-Offensive Player of The Year (2000); 2× First-team All-Big East (2000, 2001)

Career NFL statistics
- Receptions: 372
- Receiving yards: 5,685
- Receiving touchdowns: 30
- Stats at Pro Football Reference

Antonio Bryant (born March 9, 1981) is an American former professional football player who was a wide receiver in the National Football League (NFL). He played college football for the Pittsburgh Panthers, earning consensus All-American honors and winning the Fred Biletnikoff Award. Bryant was selected by the Dallas Cowboys in the second round of the 2002 NFL draft, and also played professionally for the Cleveland Browns, San Francisco 49ers, and Tampa Bay Buccaneers of the NFL.

== Early life ==
Bryant was born in Miami, Florida and graduated from Miami Northwestern High School, where he was a standout high school football player for the Bulls. He was selected as a team captain in three straight years and helped lead his team as a senior to a Class 6A state title and an undefeated record (16–0).

== College career ==
Bryant attended the University of Pittsburgh, and played for the Pittsburgh Panthers football team from 1999 to 2001. He was a first-team All-Big East selection in 2000 and 2001, and was recognized as a consensus first-team All-American as a sophomore in 2000. He also won the Fred Biletnikoff Award as the season's outstanding college football receiver in 2000; he was the second sophomore to win the award (after Randy Moss). He declared for the NFL draft after his junior year, leaving as the conference's record holder for regular-season touchdowns (26) and 100-yard receiving games (13).

== Professional career ==
Pre-draft measurables
Height	Weight	Arm length	Hand span	40-yard dash	10-yard split	20-yard split	Vertical jump	Broad jump
6 ft 1 1/4 in (1.86 m)	188 lb (85 kg)	32 1/4 in (0.82 m)	9 in (0.23 m)	4.60 s	1.62 s	2.69 s	37.0 in (0.94 m)	10 ft 1 in (3.07 m)
All values from NFL Combine

=== Dallas Cowboys ===
==== 2002 season ====
Bryant was selected by the Dallas Cowboys in the second round (63rd overall) of the 2002 NFL draft, after dropping because of character concerns. He was given number 88 with the expectation of developing into a great player and was the first rookie wide receiver to start in a season opener since Michael Irvin. At the time, his 44 receptions ranked third, his 733 receiving yards ranked fourth and his 6 touchdown receptions ranked second all-time for a Cowboys rookie in a season. On October 13, he had his signature moment against the Carolina Panthers on a 4th and 14, last minute game-winning acrobatic touchdown reception from quarterback Quincy Carter. In Week 17, he had seven receptions for 170 yards and a touchdown in a 20–14 loss to Washington. As a rookie, he finished with 44 receptions for 733 yards and six touchdowns. He was named to the PFWA All-Rookie Team.

==== 2003 season ====
In 2003, Bryant was moved to third receiver after Terry Glenn was signed as a free agent. He finished the 2003 season with 39 receptions for 550 yards and two touchdowns.

==== 2004 season ====
In 2004, the arrival of free agent Keyshawn Johnson started to affect his attitude. During a mini-camp practice after being unsatisfied with the number of reps he had, he started cursing and threw his jersey aiming at Bill Parcells head, before the team broke up the fight. Although Parcells gave him a second chance, tensions kept escalating from that point forward. He was eventually traded to the Cleveland Browns after the fifth game of the season, in exchange for wide receiver Quincy Morgan, who also had issues with his team.

=== Cleveland Browns ===
In Week 12 of the 2004 season, Bryant had eight receptions for 131 yards and two touchdowns in a 58–48 loss to the Cincinnati Bengals. In Week 13, he had seven receptions for 115 yards and two touchdowns in a 42–15 loss to the New England Patriots. He finished the 2004 season with 58 receptions for 812 yards and four touchdowns.

In Week 17 of the 2005 season, Bryant had nine receptions for 123 yards and a touchdown in the 20–16 loss to the Baltimore Ravens. In 2005, Bryant led the Browns in catches (69), receiving yards (1,009 yards) and touchdowns (four). He became a free agent at the end of the year.

=== San Francisco 49ers ===
Bryant signed as a free agent with the San Francisco 49ers in 2006. In Week 2, against the St. Louis Rams, he had four receptions for 131 yards and one touchdown in the 20–13 win. On December 22, 2006, he was suspended four games for violating the NFL's substance abuse policy. He finished the 2006 season with 40 receptions for 733 yards and three touchdowns. On March 1, 2007, he was released one year after he signed a four-year, $14 million contract.

=== Free agency ===
On September 17, 2007, Bryant was reinstated by the league, but was not able to sign with a team, partly because of a failed drug test over the summer. In October, he filed a lawsuit against the NFL to try to get them to stop drug testing him since he was not a player at the time, and to drop the failed drug test. In December, the case was resolved without the details being released.

=== Tampa Bay Buccaneers ===
After not playing the previous year, on March 10, 2008, Bryant signed a deal for the veteran minimum with the Tampa Bay Buccaneers. He had a career game against the Carolina Panthers in Week 14, finishing with nine receptions for 200 yards, including a one-handed touchdown catch dubbed "catch of the year". Despite his performance, the Buccaneers lost 38–23. In Week 16, he had six receptions for 127 yards and a touchdown in the 41–24 loss to the San Diego Chargers. Bryant finished his best season as a professional with 83 catches for 1,248 yards and seven touchdowns while averaging 15 yards per catch. He became the team's leading receiver and the second player in franchise history to record three or more consecutive 100-yard receiving games. On February 18, 2009, he was given the franchise tag by the Buccaneers. In the 2009 season, he finished with 39 receptions for 600 yards and four touchdowns. On February 25, 2010, he was waived after a somewhat disappointing and injury-plagued season.

=== Cincinnati Bengals ===
After finishing an injury-plagued season and coming off surgery to repair cartilage damage in his left knee, the Cincinnati Bengals signed Bryant on March 10, 2010, to a four-year contract worth a reported $28 million, along with multiple incentives.

After the Bengals signed Terrell Owens, Bryant gave up his No. 81 jersey for Owens, who had worn the number his entire career. In return for the number, Bryant requested Owens make a donation to his charity and wore jersey No. 19 instead. After struggling in practices and not being able to play in any of the pre-season games because of problems with his left knee, the Bengals released him on August 29.

=== Seattle Seahawks ===
On June 12, 2012, Bryant worked out for the Seattle Seahawks by attending their three-day mini-camp and took a physical for the team as well. On June 15, 2012, it was reported that he finished all three of the minicamp practices, indicating that his chronic knee injury had healed. After being out of football for two years, Bryant signed with the Seahawks on July 26. His stay with the team was short lived, as he was released on August 5.

== NFL career statistics ==
Year	Team	GP	Receiving							Rushing						Fumbles	
Year	Team	GP	Rec	Tgts	Yds	Avg	Lng	TD	FD	Att	Yds	Avg	Lng	TD	FD	Fum	Lost
2002	DAL	16	44	93	733	16.7	78	6	32	6	40	6.7	24	0	1	3	2
2003	DAL	16	39	83	550	14.1	54	2	27	2	0	0.0	2	0	0	0	0
2004	DAL	5	16	27	266	16.6	48	0	11	0	0	0.0	0	0	0	1	1
2004	CLE	10	42	72	546	13.0	55	4	25	0	0	0.0	0	0	0	0	0
2005	CLE	16	69	123	1,009	14.6	54	4	44	1	3	3.0	3	0	0	1	1
2006	SF	14	40	91	733	18.3	72	3	29	0	0	0.0	0	0	0	0	0
2008	TB	16	83	138	1,248	15.0	71	7	58	2	22	11.0	13	0	2	1	1
2009	TB	13	39	86	600	15.4	42	4	25	0	0	0.0	0	0	0	0	0
Career		106	372	713	5,685	15.3	78	30	251	11	65	5.2	24	0	3	6	5
