= Tino Sabbatelli =

American football player and professional wrestler (born 1983)

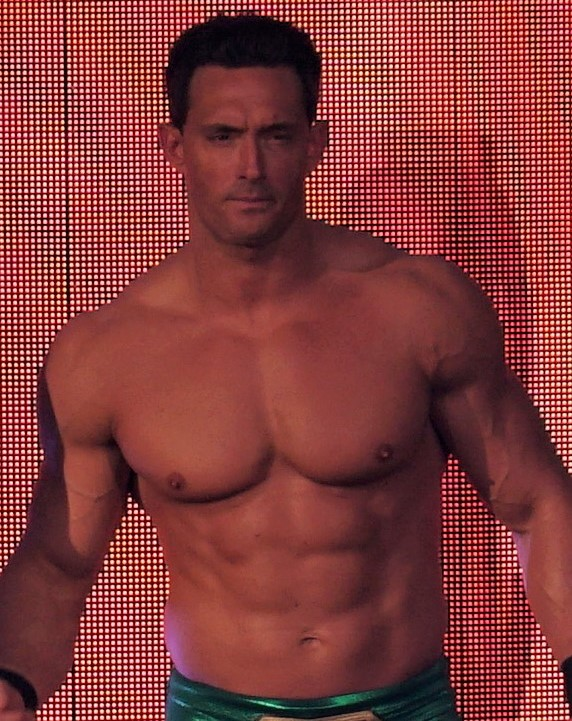
- Sabbatelli in 2018
- Born: Sabatino Piscitelli; August 24, 1983 (age 43); Boca Raton, Florida, U.S.
- Spouse: Mandy Rose (m. 2024)
- Children: 1
- Professional wrestling career
- Ring name(s): Anthony Sabbatelli; Sabatino Piscitelli; Sabby; Tino Piscitelli; Tino Sabbatelli
- Billed height: 6 ft 3 in (1.91 m)
- Billed weight: 240 lb (110 kg)
- Billed from: Boca Raton, Florida
- Trained by: WWE Performance Center
- Debut: April 4, 2015
- Retired: 2021
- Football career

No. 21, 28, 42
- Position: Safety

Personal information
- Listed height: 6 ft 3 in (1.91 m)
- Listed weight: 222 lb (101 kg)

Career information
- High school: Boca Raton (FL)
- College: Oregon State
- NFL draft: 2007: 2nd round, 64th overall pick

Career history
- Tampa Bay Buccaneers (2007–2010); Cleveland Browns (2010); Kansas City Chiefs (2011)

Awards and highlights
- First-team All-Pac-10 (2006)

Career NFL statistics
- Total tackles: 190
- Forced fumbles: 3
- Fumble recoveries: 1
- Pass deflections: 15
- Interceptions: 5
- Stats at Pro Football Reference

Sabatino Piscitelli (born August 24, 1983) is an American former professional wrestler and football player. He is known for his time in WWE, under the ring name Tino Sabbatelli.

Prior to joining WWE, Piscitelli played five seasons in the National Football League (NFL). He was selected by the Tampa Bay Buccaneers in the second round (64th overall) of the 2007 NFL draft. He also played for the Cleveland Browns and Kansas City Chiefs. He played collegiately at Oregon State.

== Early life ==
Sabatino Piscitelli was born on August 24, 1983, in Boca Raton, Florida. Piscitelli began his football career at Boca Raton High School. He began playing as a junior in high school, playing both defensive back and wide receiver. He received second team all-state honors as a senior and received four letters as an outfielder for the school's baseball team.

== College football career ==
Season	GP	T	AT	TFL	FF	FR	PD	INTs	TDs
2002°	0	0	0	0	0	0	0	0	0
2003	13	5	1	0	0	0	0	0	0
2004†	12	42	12	3	1	1	9	5	0
2005†	11	39	14	3	0	2	12	4	1
2006‡	14	54	21	3	0	0	16	5	0

GP – Games Played, T – Tackles, AT – Assisted Tackles, TFL – Tackles for Loss, FF – Forced Fumbles, FR – Fumbles Recovered, PD – Passes Defensed, INTs – Interceptions, TDs – Touchdowns
° Redshirted
† All-Pac 10 Honourable Mention
‡ All-Pac 10 First Team

== Professional football career ==
=== Tampa Bay Buccaneers ===
Piscitelli received an invitation to attend the NFL Combine due to his outstanding performance in his last year at Oregon State University. He posted the fastest pro agility time of 2006, ran a 4.44 second 40-yard dash, and bench pressed 225 lbs for 19 reps. He was selected by the Tampa Bay Buccaneers in the second round of the 2007 NFL draft, through a pick traded by the Indianapolis Colts in exchange for Anthony "Booger" McFarland. In his rookie season, he broke his right foot and was placed on the injured reserve. On November 30, 2010, the Buccaneers released him.

=== Cleveland Browns ===
Piscitelli was signed by the Cleveland Browns on December 1, 2010. He became a free agent after the season.

=== Kansas City Chiefs ===
Piscitelli signed with the Kansas City Chiefs on August 4, 2011.

=== Career statistics ===
Season	Team	GP	ST	AT	FF	PD	INTs	TDs
2007	TB	3	2	1	0	0	0	0
2008	TB	15	40	8	1	8	2	0
2009	TB	16	66	14	1	5	2	0
2010	TB	11	19	0	0	1	1	0
2010	CLE	5	3	1	0	0	0	0
2011	KC	16	28	6	1	1	0	0

GP – Games Played, ST – Solo Tackles, AT – Assisted Tackles, FF – Forced Fumbles, PD – Passes Defensed, INTs – Interceptions, TDs – Touchdowns

== Professional wrestling career ==
=== WWE (2014–2020) ===
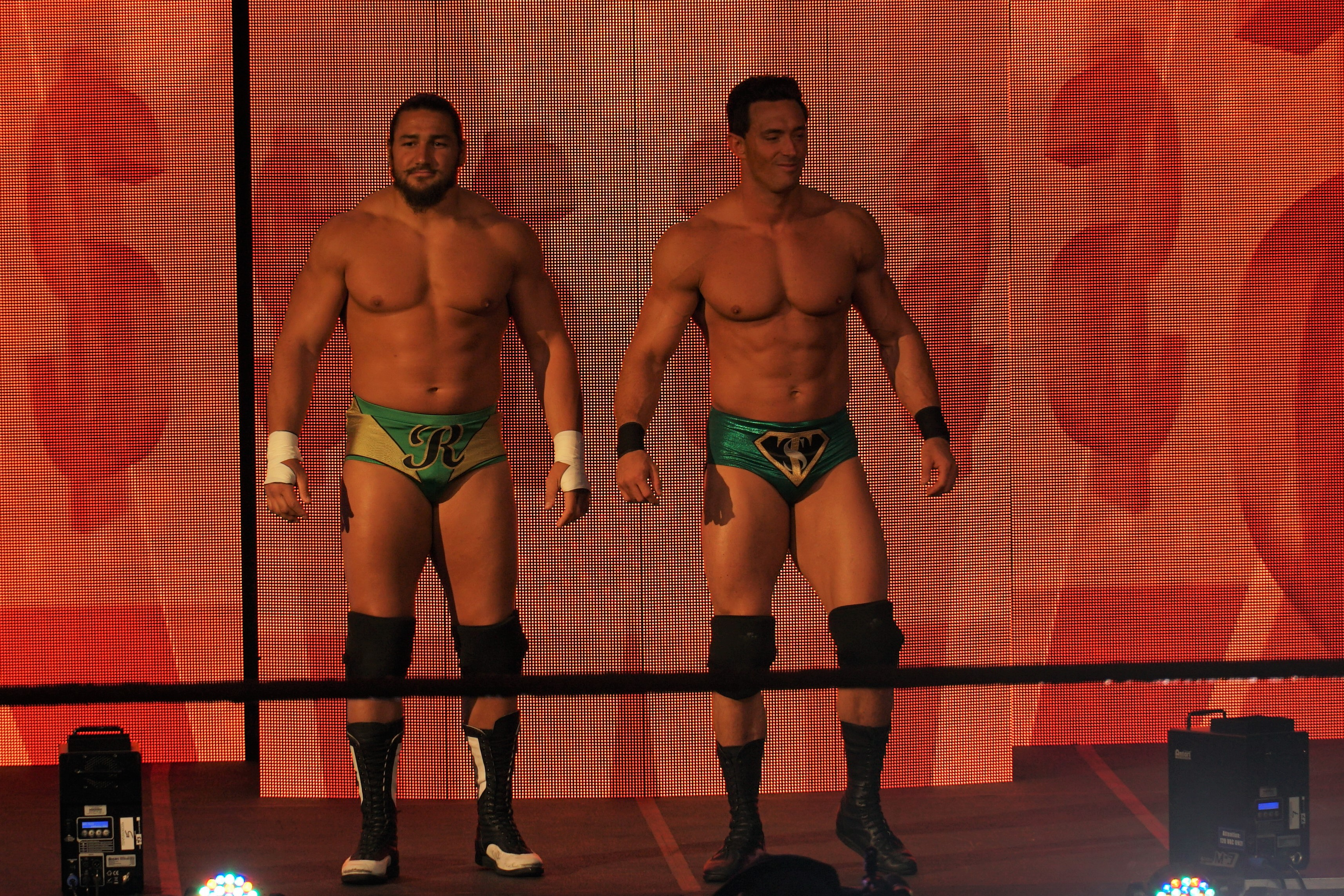
Sabbatelli (right) with regular tag team partner Riddick Moss in 2018

In October 2014, Piscitelli signed a developmental contract with WWE and began training to become a professional wrestler at the WWE Performance Center in Orlando, Florida.

He made his in-ring debut for WWE's developmental territory, NXT, at a live event on April 4, 2015, competing unsuccessfully in a battle royal. After ten months of training, he suffered a concussion during an NXT live event. In October 2015, he was given the ring name Anthony Sabbatelli, later tweaked to Tino Sabbatelli. He was featured on an exclusive TV show on the WWE Network called Breaking Ground, which featured his NXT training.

Sabbatelli made his televised debut on the October 12, 2016, episode of NXT, teaming with Riddick Moss in a loss to TM-61 in the first round of the 2016 Dusty Rhodes Tag Team Classic. He made a further appearance on the January 4, 2017, episode of NXT, again teaming with Moss in a defeat to The Revival. Sabbatelli appeared again on the May 10 episode of NXT, teaming with Moss in a loss to DIY. He had his first televised singles match on the September 20 episode of NXT, losing to Johnny Gargano. Sabbatelli and Moss had their first televised victory on the October 25 episode of NXT, defeating the team of Oney Lorcan and Danny Burch. In early 2018, Sabbatelli and Moss entered the Dusty Rhodes Tag Team Classic losing to Sanity in the first round. Sabbatelli turned on Moss on April 25 after losing to Heavy Machinery. He suffered a torn pectoral muscle at the end of April and underwent surgery. On April 17, 2020, it was announced that he was released from his WWE contract.

=== All Elite Wrestling (2020) ===
Piscitelli made his All Elite Wrestling debut under the ring name Sabby on the July 21, 2020, episode of AEW Dark, teaming with Brady Pierce in a losing effort against Best Friends.

=== Return to WWE (2020–2021) ===
On October 16, 2020, it was reported that Piscitelli had re-signed with WWE. However on June 25, 2021, Piscitelli was once again released from his WWE contract.

== Personal life ==
Piscitelli is of Italian descent. He has a sister named Sabrina, and a brother named Sean, also a professional wrestler who performs on the independent circuit under the ring name Sean Swag. As of 2018, he is in a relationship with fellow professional wrestler Amanda Saccomanno, better known by the ring name Mandy Rose. On September 17, 2022, they announced their engagement. They were married on November 2, 2024 at the Park Chateau Estate and Gardens in East Brunswick, New Jersey. On July 6, 2026. They announced they are expecting their first child together. Their son was born on July 31.

== Championships and accomplishments ==
- Pro Wrestling Illustrated
  - Ranked No. 351 of the top 500 singles wrestlers in the PWI 500 in 2017

== See also ==
- List of gridiron football players who became professional wrestlers
