= Gaines Adams =

American football player (1983–2010)

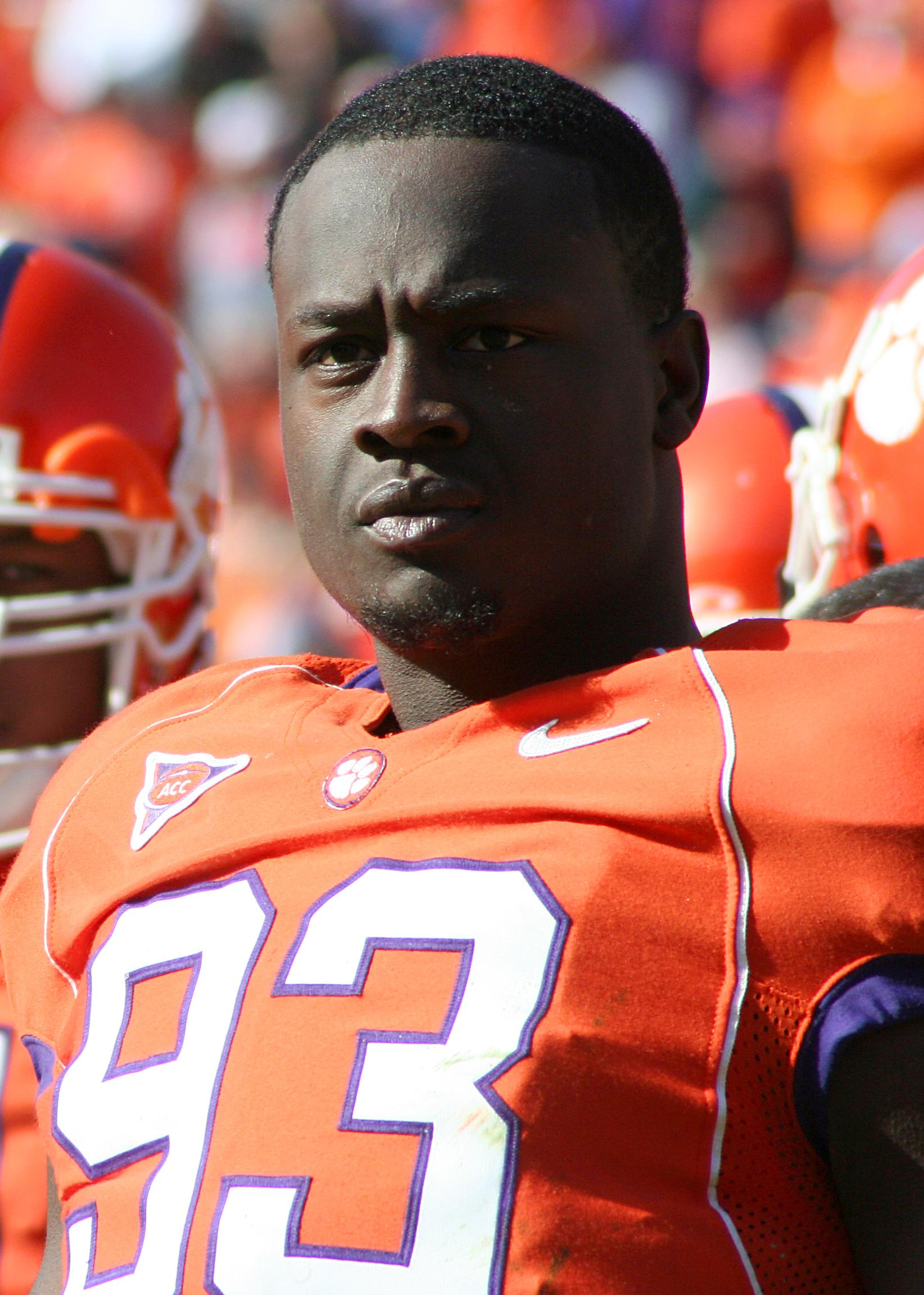
- Adams in 2006 while at Clemson

No. 90, 99
- Position: Defensive end

Personal information
- Born: June 8, 1983; Greenwood, South Carolina, U.S.
- Died: January 17, 2010 (aged 26); Greenwood, South Carolina, U.S.
- Listed height: 6 ft 5 in (1.96 m)
- Listed weight: 258 lb (117 kg)

Career information
- High school: Fork Union Military Academy (Fork Union, Virginia)
- College: Clemson (2002–2006)
- NFL draft: 2007: 1st round, 4th overall pick

Career history
- Tampa Bay Buccaneers (2007–2009); Chicago Bears (2009)

Awards and highlights
- PFW / PFWA All-Rookie Team (2007); Unanimous All-American (2006); ACC Defensive Player of the Year (2006); First-team All-ACC (2006)

Career NFL statistics
- Total tackles: 93
- Sacks: 13.5
- Forced fumbles: 4
- Fumble recoveries: 1
- Interceptions: 2
- Defensive touchdowns: 1
- Stats at Pro Football Reference

Gaines DeMario Adams IV (June 8, 1983 – January 17, 2010) was an American professional football player who was a defensive end in the National Football League (NFL) for three seasons. He played college football for Clemson University, and was recognized as a unanimous All-American. He was drafted in the first round of the 2007 NFL draft, and played professionally for the Tampa Bay Buccaneers and Chicago Bears of the NFL. Adams died unexpectedly in 2010 from a previously undetected heart condition.

== Early life ==
Gaines Adams was born on June 8, 1983, in Greenwood, South Carolina. He attended Fork Union Military Academy in 2001 and recorded 58 tackles, 22 sacks, and two interceptions in 10 games. He was a three-year starter at Cambridge Academy, a small private school which only had an 8-man football team, where he was a dominant wide receiver and defensive end. His coach during high school was former University of South Carolina quarterback, Steve Taneyhill. In 2000, his team won the state title. During that year, Cambridge shut out four teams, beating one team 80–0. They had suffered only one loss that season to rival King Academy. He had 158 career receptions for 4,394 yards and 65 touchdowns, as well as 341 tackles, 10 interceptions, and 33 sacks in his career, and was a two-time All-state honoree. He chose Clemson over Georgia, Maryland, North Carolina, South Carolina, and Virginia. He had narrowed down his choices to North Carolina and Clemson, then signed with Clemson after the Tar Heels unexpectedly rescinded their offer. At Cambridge, he was named to the Greenwood Touchdown Club/Index-Journal All-Lakelands Team (which included four counties).

College recruiting
Name	Hometown	School	Height	Weight	40^{‡}	Commit date
Gaines Adams; DE	Greenwood, South Carolina	Fork Union Military Academy	6 ft 6 in (1.98 m)	240 lb (110 kg)	4.9	
Gaines Adams; DE	Recruit ratings: Scout: Rivals:					
Overall recruit ranking: Scout: 28 (school) Rivals: 22 (school)
‡ Refers to 40-yard dash; Note: In many cases, Scout, Rivals, 247Sports, On3, and ESPN may conflict in their listings of height, weight and 40 time.; In these cases, the average was taken. ESPN grades are on a 100-point scale.; Sources: "2002 Clemson Football Commitment List". Rivals.; "2002 Clemson College Football Team Recruiting Prospects". Scout.; "Scout.com Team Recruiting Rankings". Scout.; "2002 Team Ranking". Rivals.com.

== College career ==
Adams attended Clemson University, and played for the Clemson Tigers football team from 2002 to 2006. He was redshirted in 2002. As a redshirt freshman in 2003, he did not see much action as the second-team defensive end, only totaling 15 tackles and a sack. In 2004, he had 35 tackles with 8 sacks, and two blocked punts playing on special teams. For his hard work on special teams, Adams was awarded the 12th Man Award for Clemson's defense. Adams considered coming out for the NFL draft after his sophomore year, but after the underclassman panel gave him a conservatively low ranking he decided to stay for his junior year.

Adams' 2005 junior season was a breakout year for him. He totaled 56 tackles, 9.5 sacks, and forced three fumbles while starting at boundary defensive end. Before his senior year in 2006, he was slated to be among the best defensive ends in the college football. Adams lived up to his reputation by starting all 12 games, recording 12.5 sacks, causing 2 fumbles and recovering 3. By the end of the 2006 season, Adams recorded a total of 28 career sacks, tying the school record set by Michael Dean Perry (1984–1987). In addition, Adams was named to all five All-America teams acknowledged by the NCAA in 2006, and was recognized as one of seven unanimous first-team All-Americans that year.

== Professional career ==
Pre-draft measurables
Height	Weight	40-yard dash	10-yard split	20-yard split	20-yard shuttle	Three-cone drill	Vertical jump	Broad jump	Bench press
6 ft 4 3/4 in (1.95 m)	258 lb (117 kg)	4.66 s	1.64 s	2.73 s	4.36 s	7.17 s	35 in (0.89 m)	9 ft 11 in (3.02 m)	21 reps
Bench press from Pro Day, all other values from NFL Combine.

=== Tampa Bay Buccaneers ===
Adams was chosen by the Tampa Bay Buccaneers in the first round as the fourth overall pick in the 2007 NFL draft. He signed a six-year deal with the Buccaneers on July 26, 2007, worth $46 million, with $18.6 million guaranteed. He registered his first solo sack against the Atlanta Falcons in week 11 of the 2007 season.

In 2007, Adams had 35 tackles, 6 sacks and 2 forced fumbles. He led all rookies with his six sacks and gained him a place in the 2007 NFL All-Rookie team. He also played in Tampa Bay Buccaneers playoff loss to the New York Giants and finished the game with five tackles and one sack. Against the Colts in Week 5, he blocked a field goal attempt by Adam Vinatieri.

In 2008, Adams recorded two sacks against the Atlanta Falcons in Week 2. He recorded his first career interception and returned it for his first career touchdown in a Week 3 overtime win over the Chicago Bears. The following week, Adams recorded another interception of Packers quarterback Aaron Rodgers to seal a Buccaneers victory. In Week 8, in a loss to the Dallas Cowboys, Adams recorded two sacks.

=== Chicago Bears ===
On October 19, 2009, Adams was traded to the Chicago Bears for a second-round draft pick in the 2010 NFL draft. In 10 games for the Bears, Adams had 7 combined tackles, 1 pass deflection and 1 forced fumble.

=== NFL statistics ===
Year	Team	GP	COMB	TOTAL	AST	SACK	FF	FR	FR YDS	INT	IR YDS	AVG IR	LNG	TD	PD
2007	TB	16	38	28	10	6.0	2	0	0	0	0	0	0	0	2
2008	TB	16	38	27	11	6.5	0	0	0	2	50	25	45	1	6
2009	TB	5	10	8	2	1.0	0	1	0	0	0	0	0	0	2
2009	CHI	10	7	4	3	0.0	2	0	0	0	0	0	0	0	1
Career		47	93	67	26	13.5	4	1	0	2	50	25	45	1	11

== Death ==
Adams was taken to the emergency room at Self Regional Healthcare in Greenwood, South Carolina on the morning of January 17, 2010, after his girlfriend found him at home. He was pronounced dead at 8:21 AM ET. The coroner confirmed, after an autopsy, that Adams died of cardiac arrest due to cardiomyopathy (an enlarged heart). He was 26 years old. Neither Adams nor his relatives knew about any kind of medical condition he may have had. At the time of his death, neither drug abuse nor foul play was suspected.

== See also ==
- List of American football players who died during their career
