= Greg Spires =

American football player (born 1974)

No. 94, 96
- Position: Defensive end

Personal information
- Born: August 12, 1974 (age 52); Marianna, Florida, U.S.
- Listed height: 6 ft 1 in (1.85 m)
- Listed weight: 265 lb (120 kg)

Career information
- High school: Mariner (FL)
- College: Florida State
- NFL draft: 1998: 3rd round, 83rd overall pick

Career history
- New England Patriots (1998–2000); Cleveland Browns (2001); Tampa Bay Buccaneers (2002–2007); Oakland Raiders (2008)*
- * Offseason or practice squad member only

Awards and highlights
- Super Bowl champion (XXXVII); Second-team All-ACC (1997)

Career NFL statistics
- Tackles: 345
- Sacks: 39.5
- Forced fumbles: 11
- Fumble recoveries: 6
- Passes defended: 15
- Stats at Pro Football Reference

Gregory Tyrone Spires (born August 12, 1974) is an American former professional football player who was a defensive end in the National Football League (NFL). He was selected by the New England Patriots in the third round of the 1998 NFL draft. He played college football for the Florida State Seminoles.

Spires was also a member of the Cleveland Browns, Tampa Bay Buccaneers, and Oakland Raiders. He earned a Super Bowl ring with the Buccaneers in Super Bowl XXXVII.

== College career ==
Greg Spires played college football at Florida State University as a Seminole. He was a four-year letterman from 1994 to 1998. His NFL draft status dropped to the third round as a result of a cracked fibula entering the end of his junior year. It carried through to three games of his senior season. Also, Spires did not start in his junior season. Throughout his college career, he played the positions of linebacker, nose guard, and defensive end. Greg Spires was redshirted in 1993.

== Professional career ==
=== New England Patriots ===
After being drafted by the New England Patriots (3rd round, 83rd selection overall), Spires played in 15 games including the playoff appearance that the Patriots had. He recorded two sacks against the Jacksonville Jaguars in the postseason. During the 1999 season, he played 11 games until he suffered a hip injury against the Buffalo Bills on November 28, 1999, and eventually was placed on injured reserve for the remainder of the 1999 season. In 2000, Greg Spires had a great year. He played in all 16 games, and started two of them. Spires recorded a career high 6 sacks and tied Willie McGinest for the team lead. Spires also forced three fumbles. He was re-signed by the Patriots on April 30, 2001. Because of team issues, Greg Spires was released by the Patriots towards the start of the 2001 season, on September 3, 2001. He was claimed and signed by the Cleveland Browns the very next day.

=== Cleveland Browns ===
Greg Spires' career with the Cleveland Browns was short-lived. Despite being there for just one season, Spires played in all 16 games and started 4. He recorded four sacks that season.

=== Tampa Bay Buccaneers ===
Greg Spires became an unrestricted free agent after the 2001 season and was signed by the Tampa Bay Buccaneers. Spires found a place with the Bucs and was their perennial starter at left defensive end from 2002 to 2007. He came at just the right time, as the Bucs sailed through the playoffs and won Super Bowl XXXVII against the Oakland Raiders. He totaled 47 tackles, 3.5 sacks, one forced fumble, one fumble recovery, and one pass defended lining up opposite right defensive end Simeon Rice. Because of the chemistry of this defense, the Tampa Bay Buccaneers became the best pass defense and best overall defense in the NFL. He played on one of the top-tier defenses in 2003, 2004, and 2005 (where they finished first again). Spires helped the Buccaneers to the playoffs, but they lost in the Wild Card round to the Washington Redskins. On February 27, 2008, the Buccaneers released him.

=== Oakland Raiders ===
On May 10, 2008, he signed with the Oakland Raiders. He was later released on August 25, 2008.

== NFL career statistics ==
Legend
	Won the Super Bowl
	Led the league
**Bold**	Career high

=== Regular season ===
Year	Team	Games		Tackles				Interceptions				Fumbles			
Year	Team	GP	GS	Comb	Solo	Ast	Sck	Int	Yds	TD	Lng	FF	FR	Yds	TD
1998	NWE	15	1	24	18	6	3.0	0	0	0	0	0	0	0	0
1999	NWE	11	0	9	7	2	0.5	0	0	0	0	0	0	0	0
2000	NWE	16	2	17	12	5	6.0	0	0	0	0	**3**	1	0	0
2001	CLE	16	4	30	23	7	4.0	0	0	0	0	2	1	0	0
2002	TAM	16	16	44	33	11	3.5	0	0	0	0	1	1	0	0
2003	TAM	15	15	36	24	12	3.5	0	0	0	0	1	1	0	0
2004	TAM	16	16	**61**	**47**	14	**8.0**	0	0	0	0	**3**	**2**	0	0
2005	TAM	16	16	47	35	12	4.0	0	0	0	0	1	0	0	0
2006	TAM	16	16	51	33	**18**	5.0	0	0	0	0	0	0	0	0
2007	TAM	10	8	26	21	5	2.0	0	0	0	0	0	0	0	0
		147	94	345	253	92	39.5	0	0	0	0	11	6	0	0

=== Playoffs ===
Year	Team	Games		Tackles				Interceptions				Fumbles			
Year	Team	GP	GS	Comb	Solo	Ast	Sck	Int	Yds	TD	Lng	FF	FR	Yds	TD
1998	NWE	1	0	1	1	0	**2.0**	0	0	0	0	0	0	0	0
2002	TAM	3	3	**10**	**9**	**1**	**2.0**	0	0	0	0	0	0	0	0
2005	TAM	1	1	2	1	**1**	0.0	0	0	0	0	0	0	0	0
2007	TAM	1	0	2	2	0	0.0	0	0	0	0	0	0	0	0
		6	4	15	13	2	4.0	0	0	0	0	0	0	0	0
