= Clifton Smith (return specialist) =

American gridiron football player (born 1985)

No. 22, 28, 43
- Position: Running back / Return specialist

Personal information
- Born: July 4, 1985 (age 41); Fresno, California, U.S.
- Listed height: 5 ft 9 in (1.75 m)
- Listed weight: 190 lb (86 kg)

Career information
- High school: Edison (Fresno, California)
- College: Fresno State
- NFL draft: 2008: undrafted

Career history
- Tampa Bay Buccaneers (2008–2009); Miami Dolphins (2010); Cleveland Browns (2010); Virginia Destroyers (2011); Calgary Stampeders (2013)

Awards and highlights
- UFL champion (2011); Second-team All-Pro (2008); Pro Bowl (2008); PFWA All-Rookie Team (2008)

Career NFL statistics
- Rushing attempts: 12
- Rushing yards: 47
- Receptions: 6
- Receiving yards: 28
- Return yards: 2,603
- Total touchdowns: 2
- Stats at Pro Football Reference

Clifton Smith, Jr. (born July 4, 1985) is an American former professional football player who was a running back and return specialist in the National Football League (NFL), Canadian Football League (CFL) and United Football League (UFL). He played college football for the Fresno State Bulldogs. He was signed by the Tampa Bay Buccaneers of the NFL as an undrafted free agent in 2008, and also played for the Miami Dolphins and Cleveland Browns of the NFL, the Virginia Destroyers of the UFL, and the Calgary Stampeders of the CFL.

== Professional career ==
=== Tampa Bay Buccaneers ===
Smith was signed by the Tampa Bay Buccaneers as an undrafted free agent following the 2008 NFL draft on May 5, 2008. He was waived during final cuts on August 30, but was re-signed to the team's practice squad on September 1. He was promoted to the active roster on October 25. In week 9 of the 2008 NFL season in a game against the Kansas City Chiefs, Smith took a kickoff return for a touchdown for 97 yards for just the second time in Buccaneer history. In week 12 of the 2008 NFL season in a game against the Detroit Lions, Smith took a punt return for a touchdown for 70 yards. On December 16, 2008, Smith was named to his first career Pro Bowl as the NFC's return specialist.

During an October 18, 2009 game against the Carolina Panthers, Smith suffered a concussion as a result of being rammed into by Panthers cornerback Dante Wesley while awaiting a punt return. The Panthers received a 15-yard penalty and Wesley was ejected from the game. Smith was placed on injured reserve on December 8, 2009, due to a second concussion.

He was re-signed on May 4, 2010 to a restricted free agent tender. On September 5, after claiming running back Kregg Lumpkin off waivers from the Green Bay Packers, the Buccaneers released Smith.

=== Miami Dolphins ===
On September 7, 2010, Smith signed with the Miami Dolphins. He was released on September 21.

=== Cleveland Browns ===
Smith was signed by the Cleveland Browns on November 16, 2010. He was released on December 1.

=== Virginia Destroyers ===
Smith was signed by the Virginia Destroyers of the United Football League on June 7, 2011.

=== Calgary Stampeders ===
Smith was signed by the Calgary Stampeders of the Canadian Football League on September 14, 2013. Smith was activated from the practice roster October 11, 2013 and suited up for his first CFL game against the BC Lions. He made an instant contribution returning the opening kickoff 54 yards. Smith scored his first CFL touchdown in the third quarter on a 6-yard pass from Kevin Glenn. He was released by the Stampeders on November 18, 2013.

== Personal ==
Smith also has two sisters, Nichole and Brianna Smith. His parents' names are Roxanne Wright and Clifton Smith, Sr. In his spare time, Smith has said that he enjoys playing video games, sleeping and buying shoes. On his Fresno State biography, Smith lists his favorite athlete as Deion Sanders.

Smith often goes by the nickname "Peanut", used extensively by both teammates and fans.
