= Donte Nicholson =

American football player (born 1981)

No. 28, 30
- Position: Safety

Personal information
- Born: December 18, 1981 (age 44); Los Angeles, California, U.S.
- Listed height: 6 ft 1 in (1.85 m)
- Listed weight: 216 lb (98 kg)

Career information
- High school: Diamond Bar (CA)
- College: Oklahoma; Mt. San Antonio
- NFL draft: 2005: 5th round, 141st overall pick

Career history
- Tampa Bay Buccaneers (2005–2008)

Awards and highlights
- Big 12 Defensive Newcomer of the Year (2003); First-team All-Big 12 (2004); Second-team All-Big 12 (2003)
- Stats at Pro Football Reference

Donte Lamar Nicholson (born December 18, 1981) is an American former professional football player who was a safety for the Tampa Bay Buccaneers of the National Football League (NFL). He was selected 141st overall by the Buccaneers in the fifth round of the 2005 NFL draft. He played college football for the Oklahoma Sooners.

He appeared in nine games for the Buccaneers in the 2005 season and made five tackles. He was re-signed on November 27, 2006. On September 1, 2007, the Buccaneers released him. On September 29, 2007, the Buccaneers re-signed him. In the 2009 offseason, the Buccaneers released him.
