= Jermaine Phillips =

American football player (born 1979)

No. 23, 32
- Position: Safety

Personal information
- Born: March 27, 1979 (age 47); Roswell, Georgia, U.S.
- Listed height: 6 ft 3 in (1.91 m)
- Listed weight: 230 lb (104 kg)

Career information
- High school: Roswell
- College: Georgia
- NFL draft: 2002: 5th round, 157th overall pick

Career history
- Tampa Bay Buccaneers (2002–2009); Omaha Nighthawks (2010); Sacramento Mountain Lions (2011)

Awards and highlights
- Super Bowl champion (XXXVII)

Career NFL statistics
- Total tackles: 425
- Sacks: 3
- Forced fumbles: 10
- Fumble recoveries: 5
- Interceptions: 11
- Defensive touchdowns: 1
- Stats at Pro Football Reference

Jermaine Phillips (born March 27, 1979) is an American former professional football player who was a safety in the National Football League (NFL). He played college football for the Georgia Bulldogs and was selected by the Tampa Bay Buccaneers in the fifth round of the 2002 NFL draft.

Phillips earned a Super Bowl ring with the Buccaneers in Super Bowl XXXVII. He also played in the United Football League for the Omaha Nighthawks and Sacramento Mountain Lions.

Jermaine was the Defensive Coordinator at Roswell High School in Roswell, Georgia and helped coach the team to back-to-back GHSA State Finals appearances in 2015 and 2016. He is currently a coach for the Westchase Colts Pop Warner organization in Florida.

== Early life ==
Phillips played high school football at Roswell High School in Roswell, Georgia. While there he played line backer, tight end and defensive back. In 1996, he was a first-team All-Area and Area Player of the Year and was named to the Fox Sports All-South second-team.

== College career ==
Phillips played college football for the Georgia Bulldogs. From 1998–1999 he was one of Georgia's back up wide receivers. In 2000, he became a strong safety and was third on the team in total tackles with 85 and also had two interceptions. In 2001, Phillips was All-Southeastern Conference first-team selection by the National Sports Bureau after leading his team with three interceptions, four forced fumbles, and second on the team with eighty tackles. He was invited to play in the 2002 Senior Bowl college all-star game. His major was health and physical education.

== Professional career ==
Phillips was selected by the Tampa Bay Buccaneers in the fifth round (157 overall) of the 2002 NFL draft. He took over the starting role when long time Buccaneer player John Lynch (who signed with the Denver Broncos) was released because of salary cap issues before the start of the 2004 season. During the 2007 season he had a career-high four interceptions.

An unrestricted free agent in the 2009 offseason, Phillips re-signed with the Buccaneers on March 5. Shortly after, it was reported the Buccaneers would experiment with moving Phillips from safety to weak-side linebacker.

Phillips played in the United Football League for the Omaha Nighthawks in 2010 and Sacramento Mountain Lions in 2011.

=== NFL statistics ===
Year	Team	GP	COMB	TOTAL	AST	SACK	FF	FR	INT	IR YDS	AVG IR	LNG IR	TD	PD
2002	TB	16	9	8	1	0.0	0	1	0	0	0	0	0	0
2003	TB	14	47	38	9	0.0	1	1	1	1	1	1	0	1
2004	TB	9	43	32	11	1.0	0	0	1	0	0	0	0	3
2005	TB	13	61	46	15	0.0	0	0	0	0	0	0	0	3
2006	TB	16	108	88	20	1.0	5	1	2	45	22.5	29	0	8
2007	TB	15	83	70	13	1.0	3	0	4	2	.5	2	0	7
2008	TB	11	59	48	11	0.0	1	1	3	72	24	58	0	5
2009	TB	2	11	6	5	0.0	0	0	0	0	0	0	0	0
Career		96	421	336	85	3.0	10	4	11	160	14.5	58	0	27
