= Anthony Davis (offensive tackle, born 1980) =

American football player (born 1980)

No. 69, 66
- Position: Offensive tackle

Personal information
- Born: March 27, 1980 (age 46); Paterson, New Jersey, U.S.
- Listed height: 6 ft 4 in (1.93 m)
- Listed weight: 322 lb (146 kg)

Career information
- College: Virginia Tech
- NFL draft: 2003: undrafted

Career history
- Tampa Bay Buccaneers (2003–2008); St. Louis Rams (2008); New Orleans Saints (2009)*; Florida Tuskers (2009–2010); Virginia Destroyers (2011–2012); San Diego Chargers (2012)*
- * Offseason or practice squad member only

Awards and highlights
- UFL champion (2011); Second-team All-Big East (2002)

Career NFL statistics
- Games played: 47
- Games started: 32
- Fumble recoveries: 1
- Stats at Pro Football Reference

Anthony Sherrod Davis (born March 27, 1980) is an American former professional football player who was an offensive tackle in the National Football League (NFL). He was signed by the Tampa Bay Buccaneers as an undrafted free agent in 2003. He played college football for the Virginia Tech Hokies. Davis has also been signed to the St. Louis Rams and New Orleans Saints. He was released by the San Diego Chargers on August 31, 2012.

Pre-draft measurables
Height	Weight	Arm length	Hand span	40-yard dash	10-yard split	20-yard split	20-yard shuttle	Three-cone drill	Vertical jump	Broad jump
6 ft 4 3/8 in (1.94 m)	329 lb (149 kg)	32 3/4 in (0.83 m)	9 5/8 in (0.24 m)	5.00 s	1.83 s	3.07 s	4.98 s	8.26 s	27.5 in (0.70 m)	7 ft 11 in (2.41 m)
All values from NFL Combine/Pro Day
