= Antoine Cash =

American football player (born 1982)

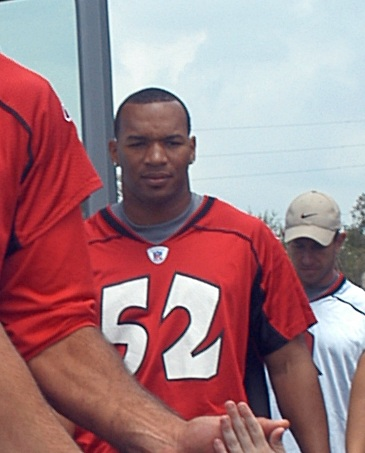
- Cash in 2006.

No. 54, 52
- Position: Linebacker

Personal information
- Born: March 5, 1982 (age 44); Anguilla, Mississippi, U.S.
- Listed height: 6 ft 1 in (1.85 m)
- Listed weight: 223 lb (101 kg)

Career information
- College: Southern Miss
- NFL draft: 2005: undrafted

Career history
- Atlanta Falcons (2005); Tampa Bay Buccaneers (2005–2008)

Career NFL statistics
- Total tackles: 12
- Stats at Pro Football Reference

Antoine Cash (born March 5, 1982) is an American former professional football player who was a linebacker in the National Football League (NFL). He played college football for the Southern Miss Golden Eagles before being signed by the Atlanta Falcons as an undrafted free agent in 2005.

== Early life ==
Cash attended South Delta High School in Rolling Fork, Mississippi, and was a student and a letterman in football. In football, as a senior, he started as an outside linebacker and as a running back and rushed for 1,378 yards. After his senior season, Cash was named to The Clarion-Ledger's "Top 40 Recruits in Mississippi" and was invited to participate in the Alabama/Mississippi All-Star Classic. Is now the Defensive Coordinator and Assistant Head Coach at Canton High School in Canton, Mississippi.
