= Mycah Pittman =

American football player (born 2000)

No. 4
- Position: Wide receiver

Personal information
- Born: June 15, 2000 (age 26); Tampa, Florida, U.S.
- Listed height: 5 ft 11 in (1.80 m)
- Listed weight: 200 lb (91 kg)

Career information
- High school: Calabasas (Calabasas, California)
- College: Oregon (2019–2021); Florida State (2022); Utah (2023–2024)

Awards and highlights
- Pac-12 Champion (2020)
- Stats at ESPN

Other information
- Relatives
- Father: Michael Pittman Sr.
- Brother: Michael Pittman Jr.

Mycah Pittman (born June 15, 2000) is an American former college football player who was a wide receiver for the Oregon Ducks, Florida State Seminoles and Utah Utes.

== High school ==
Pittman attended Calabasas High School where he played football. His sophomore year he had 1,329 receiving yards and 11 total touchdowns. Junior Year had 60 catches for 1,027 yards and 11 touchdowns. Senior year he had 67 catches for 824 yards and 12 touchdowns.

== College career ==
Pittman committed to Oregon in 2018. As a freshman in 2019 he played seven games and caught 18 passes for 227 yards and 2 touchdowns. In his freshman year, he missed 7 games due to injury. His sophomore year in 2020 he started 4 of the 5 games played in the short season due to COVID-19. He caught 8 passes for 123 yards his sophomore season. He played in the Fiesta Bowl during his sophomore year and the 2020 Rose Bowl during freshman year. On November 17, 2021, Pittman announced he was leaving Oregon.

=== College statistics ===
| Year | Team | Receiving | | | | | Rushing | | |
| Year | Team | GP | Rec | Yds | Avg | TD | Att | Yds | TD |
|---|---|---|---|---|---|---|---|---|---|
| 2019 | Oregon | 7 | 18 | 227 | 12.6 | 2 | 0 | 0 | 0 |
| 2020 | Oregon | 4 | 8 | 123 | 15.4 | 0 | 2 | -3 | 0 |
| 2021 | Oregon | 7 | 12 | 197 | 16.4 | 0 | 0 | 0 | 0 |
| 2022 | Florida State | 13 | 32 | 330 | 10.3 | 3 | 7 | 35 | 0 |
| 2023 | Utah | 2 | 3 | 20 | 6.7 | 0 | 1 | -2 | 0 |
| 2024 | Utah | 5 | 6 | 50 | 8.3 | 0 | -2 | 0 | 0 |
| Career | | 38 | 79 | 947 | 12.0 | 5 | 11 | 30 | 0 |

== Personal life ==
Pittman's father is Michael Pittman Sr., former NFL running back and Super Bowl champion. Pittman Sr. played on the Tampa Bay Buccaneers 2002 championship roster. His older brother, Michael Pittman Jr., is a wide receiver for the Pittsburgh Steelers.

In his spare time, Pittman livestreams on Twitch. He also runs a YouTube channel.

In June 2024, Pittman got his pilot's license.
