= Michael Pittman Jr. =

American football player (born 1997)

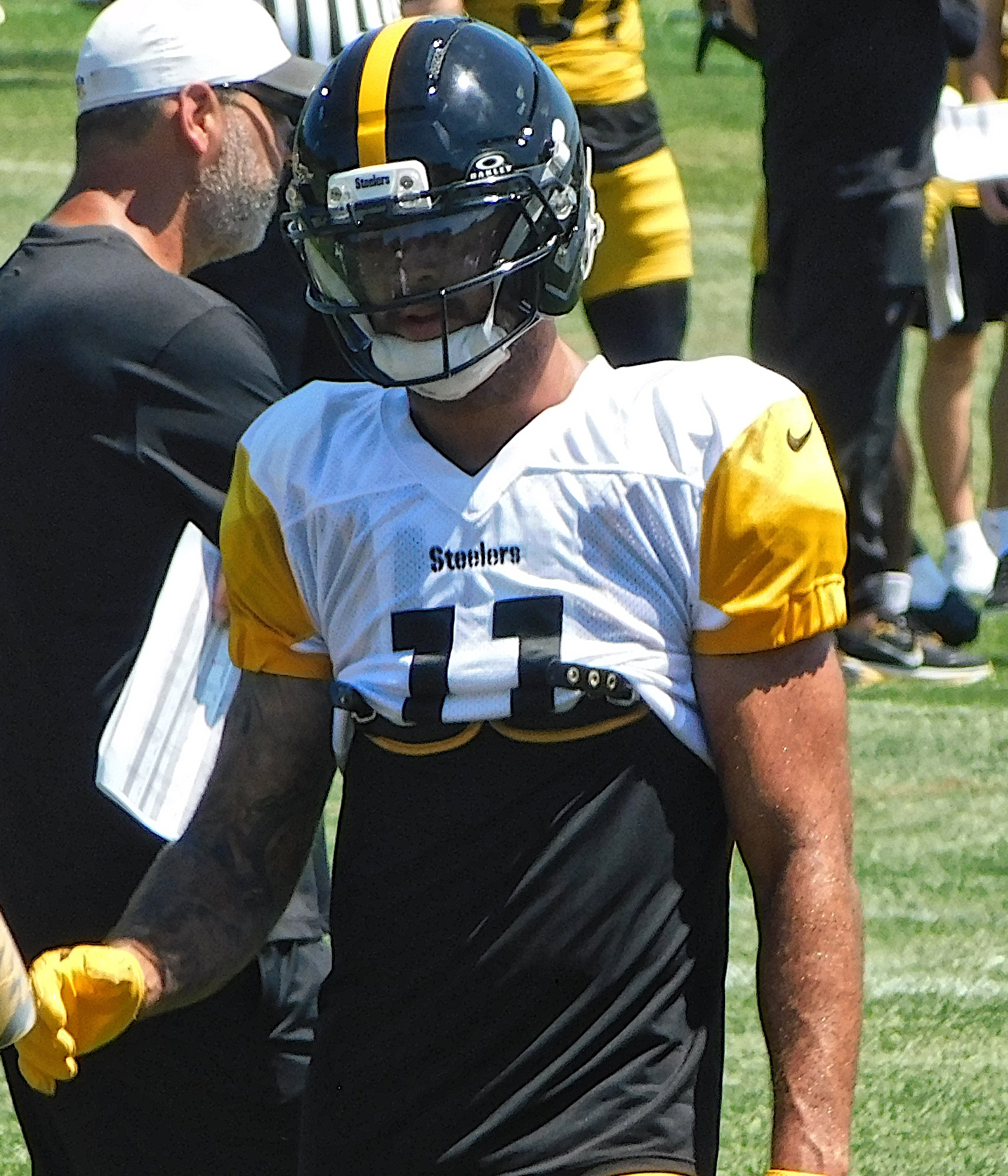
- Pittman with the Pittsburgh Steelers in 2026

No. 11 – Pittsburgh Steelers
- Position: Wide receiver
- Roster status: Injured reserve/designated for return

Personal information
- Born: October 5, 1997 (age 29); Bakersfield, California, U.S.
- Listed height: 6 ft 4 in (1.93 m)
- Listed weight: 223 lb (101 kg)

Career information
- High school: Oaks Christian (Westlake Village, California)
- College: USC (2016–2019)
- NFL draft: 2020: 2nd round, 34th overall pick

Career history
- Indianapolis Colts (2020–2025); Pittsburgh Steelers (2026–present)

Awards and highlights
- Second-team All-American (2019); 2× First-team All-Pac-12 (2017, 2019); Pop Warner Award (2019)

Career NFL statistics as of Week 4, 2025
- Receptions: 492
- Receiving yards: 5,343
- Receiving touchdowns: 25
- Stats at Pro Football Reference

Michael Pittman Jr. (born October 5, 1997) is an American professional football wide receiver for the Pittsburgh Steelers of the National Football League (NFL). He played college football for the USC Trojans, earning consensus second-team All-American honors as a senior. He was selected by the Indianapolis Colts in the second round of the 2020 NFL draft.

== Early life ==
Pittman grew up in Southern California and attended Valencia High School as a freshman, and Oaks Christian School in Westlake Village, California, for his sophomore, junior, and senior year. As a senior, He caught 81 passes for 1,990 yards and 24 touchdowns and was named first-team All-America by Parade and Max Preps and participated in the All-American Bowl. In the final game of his high school career, Pittman caught 16 passes for 354 yards and five touchdowns. Rated a four star recruit, Pittman initially committed to play college football for the UCLA Bruins. He re-opened his recruitment in the summer of 2015 and ultimately committed to play at the University of Southern California over Oregon.

== College career ==
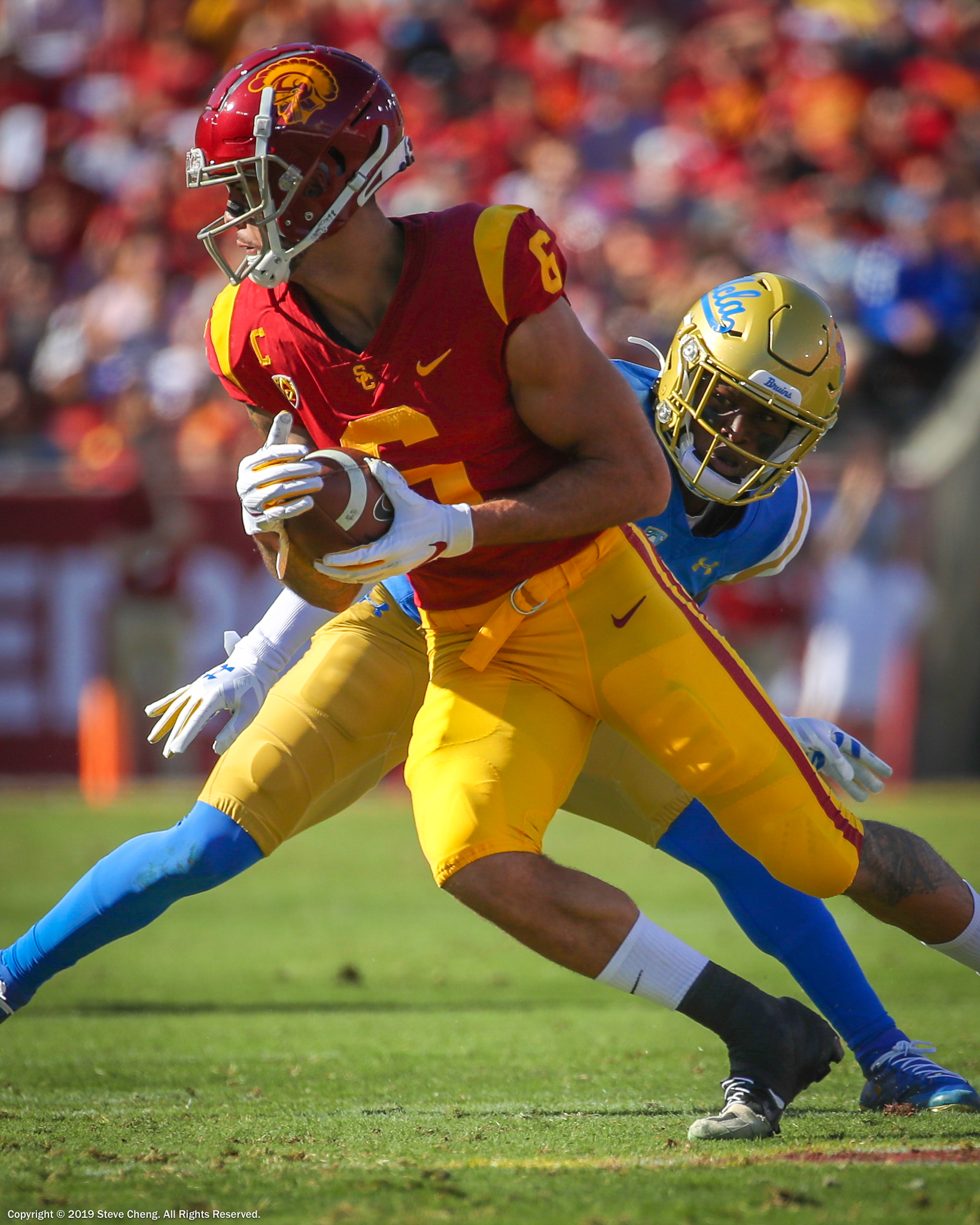
Pittman at USC

Pittman enrolled at USC in the spring of 2016 after graduating from Oaks Christian a semester early. As a true freshman, he caught 6 passes for 82 yards on offense while returning two punts for 63 yards, four kickoffs for 31 yards, blocking punt and forcing a fumble on special teams. In his sophomore season, he had 23 receptions for 404 yards and two touchdowns with a punt returned for a touchdown and a blocked punt on special teams. Pittman was named the Pac-12 Conference Special Teams Player of the Week for Week 12 after returning a punt 72 yards for a touchdown against UCLA and was named first-team All-Conference as a special teamer.

As junior, Pittman was named honorable mention All-Pac-12 Conference after posting 41 receptions for 758 yards with six touchdowns. Following the end of the season, Pittman considered forgoing his final season of eligibility to enter the 2019 NFL draft but opted to return for his senior year after receiving a third-round grade from the NFL Draft Advisory Board. Pittman caught 10 passes for 232 yards (5th-most in a game in USC history) and a touchdown in a 30–23 win over tenth-ranked Utah on September 20, 2019. Pittman finished the season with 101 receptions for 1,275 yards and 11 touchdowns and was named first-team All-Pac-12 and a consensus second-team All-America selection. He was also a finalist for the Fred Biletnikoff Award and won the Pop Warner Award, given to the college senior with the biggest impact on and off the field.

== Professional career ==
Pre-draft measurables
Height	Weight	Arm length	Hand span	Wingspan	40-yard dash	10-yard split	20-yard split	20-yard shuttle	Three-cone drill	Vertical jump	Broad jump	Bench press	Wonderlic
6 ft 4 in (1.93 m)	223 lb (101 kg)	32 1/2 in (0.83 m)	9 1/4 in (0.23 m)	6 ft 7 1/4 in (2.01 m)	4.52 s	1.51 s	2.68 s	4.14 s	6.96 s	36.5 in (0.93 m)	10 ft 1 in (3.07 m)	13 reps	29
All values from NFL Combine

=== Indianapolis Colts ===
==== 2020 season ====
Pittman was selected by the Indianapolis Colts in the second round with the 34th overall pick in the 2020 NFL draft. Pittman made his professional debut on September 13, 2020, against the Jacksonville Jaguars, catching two passes for ten yards in the 27–20 loss. He was placed on injured reserve on October 3, due to compartment syndrome in his calf. Pittman was activated on October 31. In Week 9 against the Baltimore Ravens, he caught 4 passes for 56 yard in a 24–10 loss to the Ravens. He had his first 100-yard game with seven receptions for 101 yards in the 34–17 victory against the Tennessee Titans in Week 10 on Thursday Night Football. He was the first Colts' rookie to have 100 receiving yards in a game since Donte Moncrief in 2014. In Week 11 against the Green Bay Packers, Pittman caught three passes for 66 yards and his first career touchdown reception on a 45-yard pass play in the 34–31 victory. Pittman finished his rookie season with 40 catches for 503 yards.

==== 2021 season ====
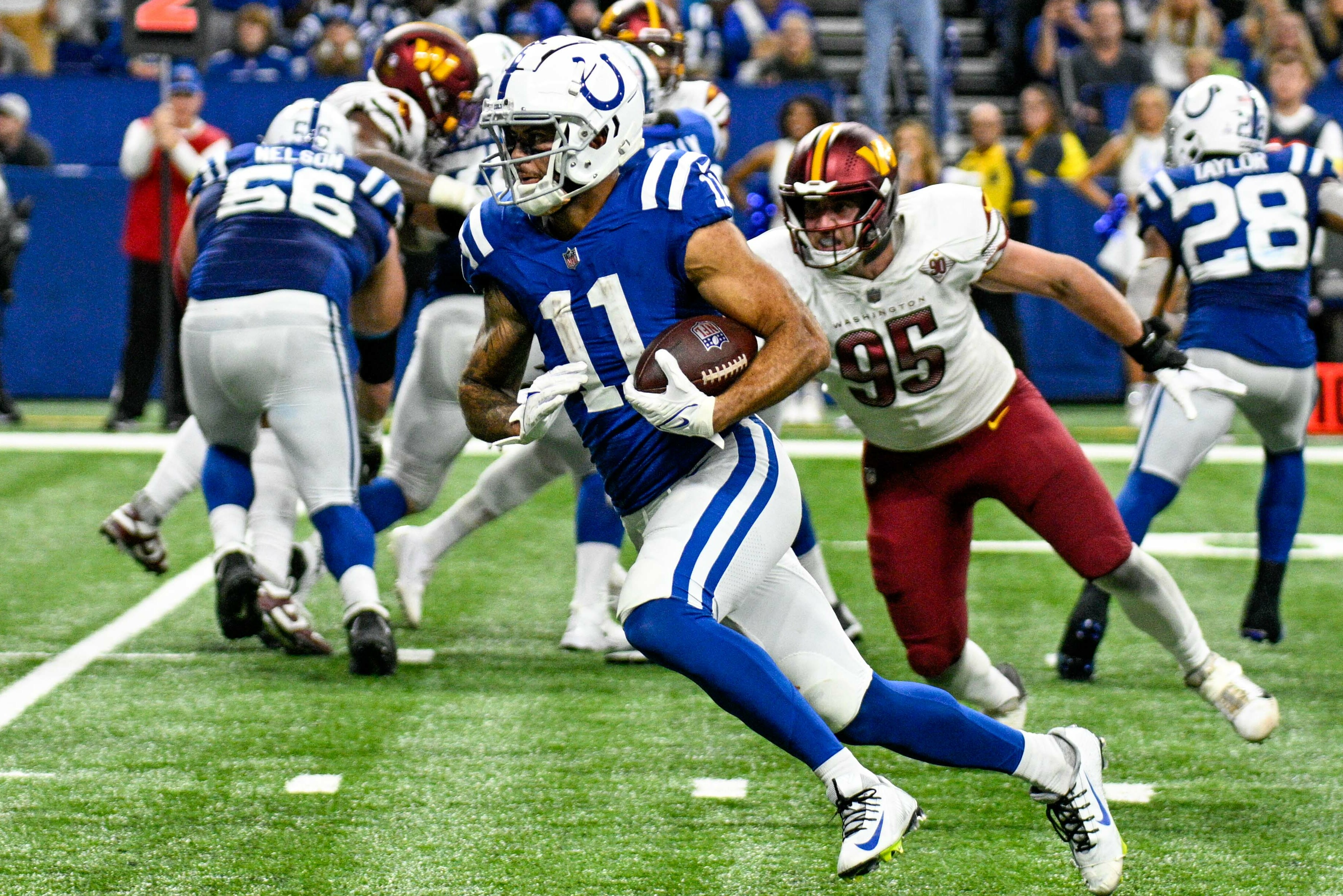
Pittman playing for the Colts in 2022.

In a Week 2 loss against the Los Angeles Rams, Pittman had a career game, hauling in eight passes for 123 yards. Pittman scored his second career touchdown in a 31–25 loss to the Baltimore Ravens, finishing with six receptions for 89 yards. Continuing to carve out a big role in the Colts' offense, Pittman hit 100 receiving yards for the third time in his career in a Week 7 Sunday Night Football matchup against the San Francisco 49ers. He caught four passes for 105 yards, including a touchdown catch that sealed the Colts' 30–18 win. In the following week's overtime loss against the Tennessee Titans, Pittman recorded 10 receptions on 15 targets for 86 yards, also scoring two touchdowns within a minute. His targets, receptions, and touchdowns were all career-highs. In a Week 14 win against the New England Patriots, Pittman was ejected in the third quarter for his involvement in a fight with Patriots safety Kyle Dugger. On December 23, 2021, Pittman was named a 2022 Pro Bowl alternate. In the Colts' Week 17 loss against the Las Vegas Raiders, Pittman broke 1,000 receiving yards on the season and became the sixth Colts' pass catcher since 2000 to do so.

==== 2022 season ====
Pittman made 16 starts for Indianapolis during the 2022 season, recording 99 receptions for 925 yards and four touchdowns; he also logged three rushes for 30 scoreless yards.

==== 2023 season ====
In Week 1, Pittman caught eight passes for 97 yards and one touchdown, during a 31–21 loss to the Jaguars. In a Week 13 victory over the Tennessee Titans, Pittman hauled in his 314th career reception, breaking the Colts franchise record for the most catches in the first four years of a player's career. One week later, he tied former Colts receiver and Pro Football Hall of Famer Marvin Harrison for the most consecutive games with at least eight receptions in Colts history. In the Week 15 game against the Pittsburgh Steelers, Pittman was taken out of the game due to a concussion after taking a hit from safety Damontae Kazee, which led to Kazee being ejected from the game and a 15-yard roughness penalty being enacted on Pittsburgh. He finished the season as the Colts leading receiver with 109 catches for 1,152 yards and four touchdowns. Pittman was fifth in the league in catches and 14th in receiving yards.

==== 2024 season ====
On March 5, 2024, the Colts placed the franchise tag on Pittman. On March 11, he signed a three-year, $71.5 million contract extension with $46 million guaranteed.

==== 2025 season ====
Pittman recorded 784 yards on 80 receptions across 17 appearances (16 starts) for Indianapolis during the 2025 season.

=== Pittsburgh Steelers ===
On March 13, 2026, the Colts traded Pittman to the Pittsburgh Steelers along with a 2026 seventh-round pick in exchange for a 2026 sixth-round pick; he subsequently agreed to a three-year, $59 million contract extension with Pittsburgh.

== Career statistics ==
=== NFL ===
==== Regular season ====
Year	Team	Games		Receiving					Rushing					Fumbles	
Year	Team	GP	GS	Rec	Yds	Avg	Lng	TD	Att	Yds	Avg	Lng	TD	Fum	Lost
2020	IND	13	8	40	503	12.6	45	1	3	26	8.7	21	0	0	0
2021	IND	17	17	88	1,082	12.3	57	6	5	44	8.8	25	0	1	0
2022	IND	16	16	99	925	9.3	28	4	3	30	10.0	19	0	2	0
2023	IND	16	15	109	1,152	10.6	75	4	0	0	0.0	0	0	2	1
2024	IND	16	14	69	808	11.6	33	3	0	0	0.0	0	0	1	1
2025	IND	17	16	80	784	9.8	27	7	0	0	0.0	0	0	0	0
2026	PIT	3	3	7	89	12.7	28	0	0	0	0.0	0	0	0	0
Career		98	89	492	5,343	10.9	75	25	11	100	9.1	25	0	6	2

==== Postseason ====
Year	Team	Games		Receiving					Rushing					Fumbles	
Year	Team	GP	GS	Rec	Yds	Avg	Lng	TD	Att	Yds	Avg	Lng	TD	Fum	Lost
2020	IND	1	1	5	90	18	32	0	1	11	11.0	11	0	1	0
Career		1	1	5	90	18	32	0	1	11	11.0	11	0	1	0

=== College ===
Year	Team	GP	Receiving			
Year	Team	GP	Rec	Yds	Avg	TD
2016	USC	13	6	82	13.7	0
2017	USC	11	23	404	17.6	2
2018	USC	11	41	758	18.5	6
2019	USC	13	101	1,275	12.6	11
Career		48	171	2,519	14.7	19

== Personal life ==
Pittman is the son of former NFL running back and Super Bowl champion Michael Pittman and Kristin Randall. Pittman Sr. played on the Tampa Bay Buccaneers 2002 championship roster. His younger brother, Mycah Pittman, played wide receiver at Oregon, Florida State, and Utah. Pittman also runs a YouTube channel with his wife, Kianna Pittman, called "Michael and Kianna". He produces two series on YouTube: "Gameday Vlogs" and "Path to the Draft". He and his wife have three children together, 2 daughters and a son. Pittman is a Christian.
