= Ellis Wyms =

American football player (born 1979)

No. 96, 95, 97
- Position: Defensive end

Personal information
- Born: April 12, 1979 (age 47); Indianola, Mississippi, U.S.
- Listed height: 6 ft 3 in (1.91 m)
- Listed weight: 279 lb (127 kg)

Career information
- High school: Gentry (Indianola)
- College: Mississippi State
- NFL draft: 2001: 6th round, 183rd overall pick

Career history
- Tampa Bay Buccaneers (2001–2006); Seattle Seahawks (2007); Minnesota Vikings (2008); Florida Tuskers (2010)*
- * Offseason or practice squad member only

Awards and highlights
- Super Bowl champion (XXXVII)

Career NFL statistics
- Total tackles: 146
- Sacks: 19
- Forced fumbles: 5
- Fumble recoveries: 2
- Stats at Pro Football Reference

Ellis Rashad Wyms /ˈwɪmz/ (born April 12, 1979) is an American former professional football player who was a defensive tackle in the National Football League (NFL). He was selected by the Tampa Bay Buccaneers in the sixth round of the 2001 NFL draft. He played college football for the Mississippi State Bulldogs.

Wyms, who earned a Super Bowl ring with the Buccaneers in Super Bowl XXXVII, has also played for the Seattle Seahawks, Minnesota Vikings and Florida Tuskers.

== College career ==
Wyms went to Mississippi State University, where he played for the Bulldogs. He racked up 120 career tackles, with 69 solo tackles. He also collected 10 quarterback sacks in just 40 career games for the Mississippi State Bulldogs. Wyms started on the defensive line eight times as a senior. Wyms was the Bulldogs' top reserve player. In his first career start, against Oklahoma State, Wyms racked up six tackles. He majored in technology and education.

== Professional career ==
=== Tampa Bay Buccaneers ===
Wyms was selected by the Tampa Bay Buccaneers with the 183rd pick of the 2001 NFL draft, in the sixth round. In his first season, he played in four games (at the Detroit Lions, vs. the New Orleans Saints, vs. the Baltimore Ravens, and vs. the Philadelphia Eagles. However, he did not start until the Philadelphia Eagles playoff game in which the Buccaneers lost.

Ellis Wyms did not start a game in the Bucs' Super Bowl-winning season, but he ranked third on the team with 5.5 sacks. Throughout the season, he recorded 38 tackles, 5.5 sacks, two forced fumbles, and one fumble recovery. Wyms registered his first career sack against the Baltimore Ravens. During the divisional playoffs game versus the San Francisco 49ers, Wyms played along the defensive line often, racking up five tackles and defending one pass. In Super Bowl XXXVII against the Oakland Raiders, Wyms sacked Raiders quarterback Rich Gannon. He also added three tackles against the Raiders.

Wyms played in 13 games in the 2003 season, but the Bucs slumped from their Super Bowl glory to a 7–9 record. Wyms missed the last three games of the season after being placed on injured reserve because of a sprained left knee. Despite the injury, Wyms recorded 22 tackles, two sacks, and three defended passes on the season.

Wyms also had a shortened season in 2004 because of injury. He played in six games before leaving on October 23, 2004, for injured reserve due to a shoulder injury. In this season for the Buccaneers (5–11 record), Wyms totaled 19 tackles, two of them for losses. He eclipsed his career-high tackle mark against the Denver Broncos with 8 tackles. Wyms also contributed eight tackles against the St. Louis Rams.

In the Buccaneers' first playoff season since 2002, he played in all 16 games, and started against the New England Patriots. Wyms appeared in his 50th career game against the Carolina Panthers on December 11, 2005. Ellis Wyms finished the season with 17 tackles, two sacks, one forced fumble, one fumble recovery, and one pass defended. He also sacked Washington Redskins quarterback Mark Brunell in their wildcard contest.

On September 1, 2007, the Bucs released him.

=== Seattle Seahawks ===
He signed with the Seattle Seahawks before the 2007 season. He appeared in 13 games (no starts) for the team and recorded 11 tackles. He became a free agent after the season.

=== Minnesota Vikings ===
On March 17, 2008, Wyms signed a one-year contract with the Minnesota Vikings worth $1.5 million and including a $500,000 signing bonus.

== NFL career statistics ==
Legend
**Bold**	Career high

=== Regular season ===
Year	Team	Games		Tackles					Interceptions					Fumbles			
Year	Team	GP	GS	Cmb	Solo	Ast	Sck	TFL	Int	Yds	TD	Lng	PD	FF	FR	Yds	TD
2001	TAM	4	0	3	3	0	0.0	1	0	0	0	0	0	0	0	0	0
2002	TAM	14	0	**37**	**28**	9	**5.5**	4	0	0	0	0	0	**2**	**1**	0	0
2003	TAM	13	0	24	20	4	2.0	2	0	0	0	0	**2**	1	0	0	0
2004	TAM	6	0	11	7	4	0.0	1	0	0	0	0	1	0	0	0	0
2005	TAM	**16**	1	17	12	5	2.0	1	0	0	0	0	1	1	**1**	0	0
2006	TAM	13	**8**	30	19	**11**	5.0	**5**	0	0	0	0	0	0	0	0	0
2007	SEA	13	0	16	11	5	2.0	3	0	0	0	0	0	0	0	0	0
2008	MIN	**16**	0	8	6	2	2.5	2	0	0	0	0	0	1	0	0	0
		95	9	146	106	40	19.0	19	0	0	0	0	4	5	2	0	0

=== Playoffs ===
Year	Team	Games		Tackles					Interceptions					Fumbles			
Year	Team	GP	GS	Cmb	Solo	Ast	Sck	TFL	Int	Yds	TD	Lng	PD	FF	FR	Yds	TD
2001	TAM	1	0	0	0	0	0.0	0	0	0	0	0	0	0	0	0	0
2002	TAM	**3**	0	**7**	**6**	**1**	**1.0**	0	0	0	0	0	**1**	0	**1**	0	0
2005	TAM	1	0	2	1	**1**	**1.0**	**1**	0	0	0	0	0	0	0	0	0
2007	SEA	2	0	0	0	0	0.0	0	0	0	0	0	0	0	0	0	0
2008	MIN	1	0	2	1	**1**	0.0	0	0	0	0	0	0	0	0	0	0
		8	0	11	8	3	2.0	1	0	0	0	0	1	0	1	0	0

== Personal life ==
Wyms contributes to the community through the "Strong Minds, Strong Bodies" program. Ellis Wyms is also the founder of The Wyms Foundation. The program provides monthly reading activities and career advice to underprivileged children in the city of Tampa. He also participates in many community activities. In high school, he recorded 124 tackles and 7 sacks. Wyms is married to real estate consultant DeeDee Wyms.
