= Shelton Quarles =

American football player and executive (born 1971)

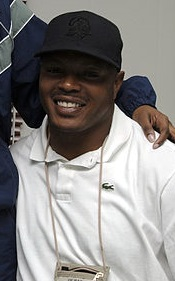
- Quarles in 2014

Tampa Bay Buccaneers
- Title: Vice president of football operations

Personal information
- Born: September 11, 1971 (age 55); Nashville, Tennessee, U.S.
- Listed height: 6 ft 1 in (1.85 m)
- Listed weight: 225 lb (102 kg)

Career information
- Position: Linebacker (No. 53)
- High school: Whites Creek (TN)
- College: Vanderbilt (1990–1993)
- NFL draft: 1994: undrafted

Career history

Playing
- Miami Dolphins (1994)*; BC Lions (1995–1996); Tampa Bay Buccaneers (1997–2006)
- * Offseason or practice squad member only

Operations
- Tampa Bay Buccaneers (2007–present); Pro scout (2007–2009); Coordinator of pro scouting (2010–2011); Director of pro scouting (2012–2013); Director of football operations (2014–2024); Senior director of football operations (2025); Vice president of football operations (2026–present)

Awards and highlights
- As player: Super Bowl champion (XXXVII); Pro Bowl (2002); As executive: Super Bowl champion (LV)

Career NFL statistics
- Tackles: 710
- Sacks: 13
- Forced fumbles: 8
- Fumble recoveries: 8
- Interceptions: 4
- Defensive touchdowns: 2
- Stats at Pro Football Reference

Shelton Eugene Quarles (born September 11, 1971) is an American football executive and former linebacker who is the vice president of football operations for the Tampa Bay Buccaneers of the National Football League (NFL). He played college football for the Vanderbilt Commodores and was signed by the Miami Dolphins as an undrafted free agent in 1994. He also played for the BC Lions and the Buccaneers, for whom he played for from 1997 to 2006.

== Early life ==
Quarles is an alumnus of Whites Creek High School in Nashville, Tennessee and was a student and a letterman in football. In football, he won a first-team All-State honors as a senior, and finished his career with 30 sacks, 505 tackles, and five interceptions. He was also a member of National Honor Society. Shelton Quarles graduated from Whites Creek High School in 1990.

== Playing career ==
Quarles played college football in Vanderbilt earning second-team All-Southeastern Conference honors as a senior and signed as an undrafted free agent by the Miami Dolphins in 1994 but was cut in training camp. Quarles then played for two seasons (1995–96) with the Canadian Football League's BC Lions before signing with the Buccaneers as a free agent in 1997.

Quarles helped lead the Buccaneers to their first Super Bowl championship in the 2002 season. Quarles also holds the record for the longest play in Buccaneers' history with a 98-yard interception return for a touchdown against the Green Bay Packers in 2001. On April 24, 2007, it was announced that the Bucs were going to release him before the 2007 NFL draft after he failed a physical.

== NFL career statistics ==
Legend
| | Won the Super Bowl |
| **Bold** | Career high |

=== Regular season ===
| Year | Team | Games | | Tackles | | | | Interceptions | | | | Fumbles | | | |
| Year | Team | GP | GS | Comb | Solo | Ast | Sck | Int | Yds | TD | Lng | FF | FR | Yds | TD |
|---|---|---|---|---|---|---|---|---|---|---|---|---|---|---|---|
| 1997 | TAM | 16 | 0 | 4 | 1 | 3 | 0.0 | 0 | 0 | 0 | 0 | 0 | **2** | 0 | 0 |
| 1998 | TAM | 16 | 0 | 12 | 9 | 3 | 1.0 | 0 | 0 | 0 | 0 | 0 | 0 | 0 | 0 |
| 1999 | TAM | 16 | 14 | 54 | 37 | 17 | 0.0 | 0 | 0 | 0 | 0 | 0 | 1 | 0 | 0 |
| 2000 | TAM | 14 | 13 | 51 | 36 | 15 | 2.0 | 1 | 5 | 0 | 5 | 0 | **2** | **5** | 0 |
| 2001 | TAM | 16 | 16 | 52 | 34 | 18 | 2.0 | 1 | **98** | **1** | **98** | 1 | 0 | 0 | 0 |
| 2002 | TAM | 16 | 16 | 113 | 74 | **39** | 1.0 | **2** | 29 | **1** | 25 | 0 | 0 | 0 | 0 |
| 2003 | TAM | 11 | 11 | 80 | 57 | 23 | 0.0 | 0 | 0 | 0 | 0 | 0 | **2** | 0 | 0 |
| 2004 | TAM | 15 | 15 | 104 | 71 | 33 | **3.5** | 0 | 0 | 0 | 0 | 0 | 0 | 0 | 0 |
| 2005 | TAM | 16 | 16 | **134** | **104** | 30 | 1.0 | 0 | 0 | 0 | 0 | **4** | 1 | 0 | 0 |
| 2006 | TAM | 12 | 12 | 106 | 68 | 38 | 2.5 | 0 | 0 | 0 | 0 | 3 | 0 | 0 | 0 |
| | | 148 | 113 | 710 | 491 | 219 | 13.0 | 4 | 132 | 2 | 98 | 8 | 8 | 5 | 0 |

=== Playoffs ===
| Year | Team | Games | | Tackles | | | | Interceptions | | | | Fumbles | | | |
| Year | Team | GP | GS | Comb | Solo | Ast | Sck | Int | Yds | TD | Lng | FF | FR | Yds | TD |
|---|---|---|---|---|---|---|---|---|---|---|---|---|---|---|---|
| 1997 | TAM | 2 | 0 | 0 | 0 | 0 | 0.0 | 0 | 0 | 0 | 0 | 0 | 0 | 0 | 0 |
| 1999 | TAM | 2 | 2 | 8 | 6 | 2 | 0.0 | 0 | 0 | 0 | 0 | 0 | 0 | 0 | 0 |
| 2000 | TAM | 1 | 1 | 6 | 6 | 0 | 0.0 | 0 | 0 | 0 | 0 | 0 | 0 | 0 | 0 |
| 2001 | TAM | 1 | 0 | 8 | 5 | 3 | 0.0 | 0 | 0 | 0 | 0 | 0 | 0 | 0 | 0 |
| 2002 | TAM | 3 | 3 | **22** | **17** | 5 | 0.0 | 0 | 0 | 0 | 0 | 0 | 0 | 0 | 0 |
| 2005 | TAM | 1 | 1 | 11 | 5 | **6** | 0.0 | 0 | 0 | 0 | 0 | 0 | 0 | 0 | 0 |
| | | 10 | 7 | 55 | 39 | 16 | 0.0 | 0 | 0 | 0 | 0 | 0 | 0 | 0 | 0 |

== Executive career ==
On August 1, 2007, the Tampa Bay Buccaneers hired Quarles as a pro scout in their personnel department. On January 20, 2011, the Buccaneers promoted Quarles to Coordinator of Pro Scouting.

On July 16, 2013, the Buccaneers promoted Quarles to director of pro scouting. On May 29, 2014, the Buccaneers promoted Quarles to director of football operations.

On May 18, 2025, Quarles was promoted once more, this time to the role of senior director of football operations. He received another promotion on June 11, 2026, assuming the role of vice president of football operations.

== Personal life ==
Upon retiring Quarles was appointed by Florida Governor Charlie Crist to the board of the Tampa Bay Area Regional Transportation Authority. He served in the position until 2009.
