= Michael Pittman Sr. =

American football player (born 1975)

Michael Pittman
No. 28, 32, 21
- Position: Running back

Personal information
- Born: August 14, 1975 (age 51); New Orleans, Louisiana, U.S.
- Listed height: 6 ft 0 in (1.83 m)
- Listed weight: 225 lb (102 kg)

Career information
- High school: Mira Mesa (San Diego, California)
- College: Fresno State (1993–1997)
- NFL draft: 1998: 4th round, 95th overall pick

Career history
- Arizona Cardinals (1998–2001); Tampa Bay Buccaneers (2002–2007); Denver Broncos (2008); Florida Tuskers (2009)

Awards and highlights
- Super Bowl champion (XXXVII); First-team All-WAC Pacific Division (1997); Second-team All-WAC Pacific Division (1996)

Career NFL statistics
- Rushing yards: 5,627
- Rushing average: 4
- Rushing touchdowns: 25
- Receptions: 425
- Receiving yards: 3,512
- Receiving touchdowns: 8
- Stats at Pro Football Reference

Other information
- Relatives
- Child: Michael Pittman Jr.
- Child: Mycah Pittman

Michael K. Pittman Sr. (born August 14, 1975) is an American former professional football player who was a running back in the National Football League (NFL). He played college football for the Fresno State Bulldogs. He was selected by the Arizona Cardinals in the fourth round of the 1998 NFL draft. He is the father of Pittsburgh Steelers receiver Michael Pittman Jr.

Pittman also played in the NFL for the Tampa Bay Buccaneers and Denver Broncos, and the Florida Tuskers of the United Football League (UFL). He won a Super Bowl ring with the Buccaneers in Super Bowl XXXVII.

== Early life ==
Pittman attended Mira Mesa Senior High School San Diego, California, and graduated in 1993. He was a first-team All-Eastern League honoree. He played with older brother Wayne.

== College career ==
Pittman is an alumnus of Fresno State. He rushed for 3,017 yards during his career at Fresno State. He was named second-team All-Western Athletic Conference (WAC) Pacific Division in 1996, and first-team All-WAC Pacific Division in 1997. Pittman is a member of Alpha Phi Alpha fraternity. He was teammates with QB Billy Volek.

- 1995: 127 carries for 561 yards with 7 TD. 15 catches for 111 yards.
- 1996: 214 carries for 1,132 yards with 13 TD. 15 catches for 109 yards.
- 1997: 238 carries for 1,057 yards with 8 TD. 32 catches for 255 yards with 2 TD.

== Professional career ==
Pre-draft measurables
| Height | Weight | Arm length | Hand span | 40-yard dash | 10-yard split | 20-yard split | 20-yard shuttle | Three-cone drill | Vertical jump | Broad jump | Bench press |
|---|---|---|---|---|---|---|---|---|---|---|---|
| 5 ft 11 1/2 in (1.82 m) | 214 lb (97 kg) | 29 7/8 in (0.76 m) | 9 1/2 in (0.24 m) | 4.50 s | 1.53 s | 2.62 s | 4.37 s | 7.54 s | 35.0 in (0.89 m) | 10 ft 0 in (3.05 m) | 22 reps |
All values from NFL Combine

=== Arizona Cardinals ===
Pittman received two years of probation for pleading no contest to misdemeanor battery in January 1998, and the Tucson Citizen reported that his draft stock fell due to the domestic violence incident. He was selected in the fourth round of the 1998 NFL draft (95th overall) by the Arizona Cardinals.

=== Tampa Bay Buccaneers ===
Pittman's career high for rushing yards in a season was 926 in 2004 and his career high for receiving yards was 597, with 75 catches, in 2003. The highest combination in one year was 2003 when he had a total of 1,348 yards (751 rushing and 597 receiving).

On January 26, 2003, Pittman played in Super Bowl XXXVII and rushed for 124 yards on 29 carries in Tampa Bay's 48–21 victory over the Oakland Raiders.

Pittman was suspended for the first three games of the 2004 NFL season for violating the NFL's personal conduct policy. He was sentenced to 14 days in prison for intentionally driving his car into a car containing his wife and child. On November 7, 2004, Pittman scored on a 78-yard touchdown run against the Kansas City Chiefs, formerly the longest run in Tampa Bay Buccaneers history.

On March 22, 2005, Pittman launched his official website, Pittman32.com, which has since gone offline. On September 11, 2005, the website was praised by Greg Auman of the St. Petersburg Times as "the team's best player site".

On January 7, 2006, during a Wild Card playoff game between the Buccaneers and Washington Redskins, Pittman was involved in an altercation with Redskins' safety Sean Taylor, who allegedly spat on him following a play. Pittman responded with a blow to Taylor's helmet. Taylor was ejected from the game that the Redskins won 17–10.

Pittman became a free agent following the 2007 season.

=== Denver Broncos ===
On May 27, 2008, Pittman was signed by the Denver Broncos and had wanted to change positions to fullback but stayed at running back. Cornerback Dré Bly was already wearing No. 32, so Pittman was assigned No. 28 as his jersey number. His official website was renamed Pittman28.com to reflect the change. The website has since gone offline, with Pittman no longer playing in the NFL.

Pittman was placed on season-ending injured reserve with a neck injury. In eight games (three starts) during the 2008 season, Pittman rushed 76 times for 320 yards and four touchdowns.

=== Florida Tuskers ===
On August 12, 2009, Pittman signed with the Florida Tuskers.

== NFL career statistics ==
Legend
| | Won the Super Bowl |
| | Led the league |
| **Bold** | Career high |

=== Regular season ===
| Year | Team | Games | | Rushing | | | | | Receiving | | | | |
| Year | Team | GP | GS | Att | Yds | Avg | Lng | TD | Rec | Yds | Avg | Lng | TD |
|---|---|---|---|---|---|---|---|---|---|---|---|---|---|
| 1998 | ARI | 15 | 0 | 29 | 91 | 3.1 | 11 | 0 | 0 | 0 | 0.0 | 0 | 0 |
| 1999 | ARI | 10 | 2 | 64 | 289 | 4.5 | 58 | 2 | 16 | 196 | **12.3** | 46 | 0 |
| 2000 | ARI | 16 | 12 | 184 | 719 | 3.9 | 29 | 4 | 73 | 579 | 7.9 | 36 | 2 |
| 2001 | ARI | 15 | 14 | **241** | 846 | 3.5 | 42 | 5 | 42 | 264 | 6.3 | 27 | 0 |
| 2002 | TAM | 16 | 15 | 204 | 718 | 3.5 | 21 | 1 | 59 | 477 | 8.1 | 64 | 0 |
| 2003 | TAM | 16 | 13 | 187 | 751 | 4.0 | 17 | 0 | **75** | **597** | 8.0 | **68** | 2 |
| 2004 | TAM | 13 | 13 | 219 | **926** | 4.2 | **78** | **7** | 41 | 391 | 9.5 | **68** | **3** |
| 2005 | TAM | 16 | 4 | 70 | 436 | **6.2** | 64 | 1 | 36 | 300 | 8.3 | 41 | 1 |
| 2006 | TAM | 16 | 3 | 50 | 245 | 4.9 | 32 | 1 | 47 | 405 | 8.6 | 25 | 0 |
| 2007 | TAM | 10 | 3 | 68 | 286 | 4.2 | 29 | 0 | 26 | 191 | 7.3 | 16 | 0 |
| 2008 | DEN | 8 | 3 | 76 | 320 | 4.2 | 20 | 4 | 10 | 112 | 11.2 | 40 | 0 |
| Career | | 151 | 82 | 1,392 | 5,627 | 4.0 | 78 | 25 | 425 | 3,512 | 8.3 | 68 | 8 |

=== Playoffs ===
| Year | Team | Games | | Rushing | | | | | Receiving | | | | |
| Year | Team | GP | GS | Att | Yds | Avg | Lng | TD | Rec | Yds | Avg | Lng | TD |
|---|---|---|---|---|---|---|---|---|---|---|---|---|---|
| 1998 | ARI | 2 | 0 | 0 | 0 | 0.0 | 0 | 0 | 0 | 0 | 0.0 | 0 | 0 |
| 2002 | TAM | 3 | 3 | **54** | **182** | 3.4 | **24** | 0 | **6** | **63** | 10.5 | **31** | 0 |
| 2005 | TAM | 1 | 0 | 0 | 0 | 0.0 | 0 | 0 | 3 | 30 | 10.0 | 22 | 0 |
| 2007 | TAM | 1 | 0 | 1 | 5 | **5.0** | 5 | 0 | 5 | 62 | **12.4** | 26 | 0 |
| Career | | 7 | 3 | 55 | 187 | 3.4 | 24 | 0 | 14 | 155 | 11.1 | 31 | 0 |

== Personal life ==
Pittman's eldest son, Michael Jr., plays wide receiver for the Pittsburgh Steelers. His younger son, Mycah, played wide receiver for Utah.
