= Michael Christianson =

American football player and coach (born 1965)

Biographical details
- Born: April 7, 1965 (age 61); Boise, Idaho, U.S.
- Education: Western Oregon University

Playing career
- 1987: Portland State
- 1988–1991: Western Oregon
- Position: Tight end - Offensive line

Coaching career (HC unless noted)
- 1992: Western Oregon (OL)
- 1993–1994: Western Oregon (TE)
- 1995: Lewis & Clark (TE/RB)
- 1996: Portland State (OL)
- 1997–1999: Portland State (RB)
- 2000-2001: Montana State (TE)
- 2002–2003: Tampa Bay Buccaneers (OL)
- 2003: Oakland Raiders (Consultant)
- 2004–2006: Nebraska (SA)
- 2006–2007: San Diego (TE)
- 2011–2013: San Francisco 49ers (RB)
- 2014-2016: ESPN Radio Boise (Host/Analyst/PD)

Accomplishments and honors

Awards
- 3× NFC Division Championships; Buccaneers (Super Bowl) Championship (XXXVII); San Diego Toreros D-IAA Mid-Major National Championship; 2005 Alamo Bowl Champion Nebraska Cornhuskers; 2× NFC Championships (NFC champions); 2× (Super Bowl). (XXXVII) & (XLVII)

Michael Christianson (born April 7, 1965) is an American football coach. He was the assistant running backs coach and the Director of Technology for the San Francisco 49ers of the National Football League (NFL) in 2011 through 2013. Prior to his tenure with the 49ers, Christianson served on Jim Harbaugh's staff at the University of San Diego, winning a Division I-AA Mid-Major national title in 2006. He has also worked at Nebraska, Montana State, and Portland State. Christianson coached the offensive line in 2002-2003 as a member of Jon Gruden's staff and the Tampa Bay Buccaneers, winning Super Bowl XXXVII (37). Christianson played tight-end and offensive lineman at Western Oregon University.

== Playing career ==
Christianson was a linebacker and tight-end at Kuna High School (Kuna, ID). He went on to play college football at Portland State University (NCAA FCS) and then transferred to Western Oregon University (NAIA DIVII).

== Coaching career ==
Christianson began his coaching career at his alma mater, Western Oregon University in 1991 and spent 4 years coaching the offensive line and the tight-ends. In 1995, he spent one season with the Lewis & Clark College Pioneers (NAIA DivII) as the recruiting coordinator and tight-ends/running backs coach.

He then went on to coach in the Big Sky Conference and Portland State University (PSU). At PSU he coached one year as the assistant offensive line coach and 3 years as the Vikings running backs coach. While at Portland State he helped develop one of the most prolific running backs in Portland State school history in Charles 'Chip' Dunn. Dunn, who played at PSU from 1997 to 2000, rushed for more than 6,000 yards as a Viking, was a first-team All-American and is a member of the Portland State Athletics Hall of Fame.

Christianson left Portland State in 2000 to coach the tight-ends for the Bobcats and Montana State University.

He made his NFL coaching debut as the assistant offensive line coach for the 2002 Super Bowl XXXVII Champion Tampa Bay Buccaneers and head coach Jon Gruden. After a short stint with the Oakland Raiders as a contractor, he followed Raiders head coach Bill Callahan to the University of Nebraska–Lincoln from 2004 through 2006 as a senior offensive assistant. The Huskers beat Michigan in the 2005 Alamo Bowl during his tenure.

Christianson had a couple stops with both Avid Sports and XOS Digital where he worked to develop, implement and train coaches on the use and benefits of technology as it relates to the sport of football. Christianson is considered an expert when it comes to technology and how it relates to the game of football. He coordinated and helped develop large football technology projects at the Oakland Raiders, the University of Nebraska and the San Francisco 49ers.

After working with Jim Harbaugh at the Raiders, he joined the staff at the University of San Diego (USD) in 2006. At USD, Christianson worked as the tight-end coach and assistant offensive Line coach with current University of Southern Cal Run Game Coordinator/Runningback Coach, Tim Drevno. During his tenure, USD won the Pioneer Football League championship and an NCAA Division I-AA Mid-Major National Championship. That year, USD led the Nation in passing offense, total offense, and scoring offense. He also coached USD starting tight end Chris Ramsey to a 2nd Team Mid-Major All-American honors.

In 2012, Christianson coached in his second Super Bowl after joining the San Francisco 49ers in February 2011. Working closely with Tom Rathman, Christianson helped develop the 49ers rushing attack in 2011, when veteran player Frank Gore had his 5th 1,000 yard season. Gore became the 49ers all-time leading rusher in 2011. Christianson coached running back Frank Gore in 2012 when Gore was named to the NFL Pro Bowl.

== Personal life ==
Christianson is a native of Boise Idaho and is married to his wife Tracy. He received his bachelor's and master's degree in secondary education and administration with a minor in computer applications from Western Oregon University & Oregon State University.
