= 2002 Tampa Bay Buccaneers season =

27th season in franchise history; first Super Bowl appearance and win

- Owner: Malcolm Glazer
- General manager: Rich McKay
- Head coach: Jon Gruden
- Home stadium: Raymond James Stadium

Results
- Record: 12–4
- Division place: 1st NFC South
- Playoffs: Won Divisional Playoffs (vs. 49ers) 31–6; Won NFC Championship (at Eagles) 27–10; Won Super Bowl XXXVII (vs. Raiders) 48–21
- All-Pros: 5: DE Simeon Rice (1st team); DT Warren Sapp (1st team); LB Derrick Brooks (1st team); CB Ronde Barber (2nd team); SS John Lynch (2nd team)
- Pro Bowlers: 7: QB Brad Johnson; FB Mike Alstott; DE Simeon Rice; DT Warren Sapp; LB Derrick Brooks; LB Shelton Quarles; SS John Lynch
- Team MVP: QB Brad Johnson

The 2002 season was the Tampa Bay Buccaneers' 27th in the National Football League (NFL). It was one of the most successful seasons in franchise history, ending with a victory in Super Bowl XXXVII.

The season began with the team trying to improve on a 9–7 season and did so with a franchise-best 12–4 record. It was Jon Gruden's first season as the Buccaneers’ head coach. They won the Super Bowl for the first time in the team's history, beating the Oakland Raiders 48–21. This was Tampa Bay's only Super Bowl appearance and win until 2020, with the Super Bowl win also being their most recent playoff game win in the same span. The 2002 Buccaneers’ defense, which included four players who would eventually be elected the Pro Football Hall of Fame, allowed 196 points in the regular season (12.3 points per game), which is the fifth-lowest of any team in the 16-game season era from 1978 to 2021, and the second-lowest of any Super Bowl-winning team (after the 2000 Ravens). As such, the 2002 Buccaneers defense is remembered as among the greatest of all time. In 2019, the NFL ranked the 2002 Buccaneers as the 45th best NFL team of all time. As of 2025, this is the last time that a defense gave up less than 200 points in a season.

== Summary ==
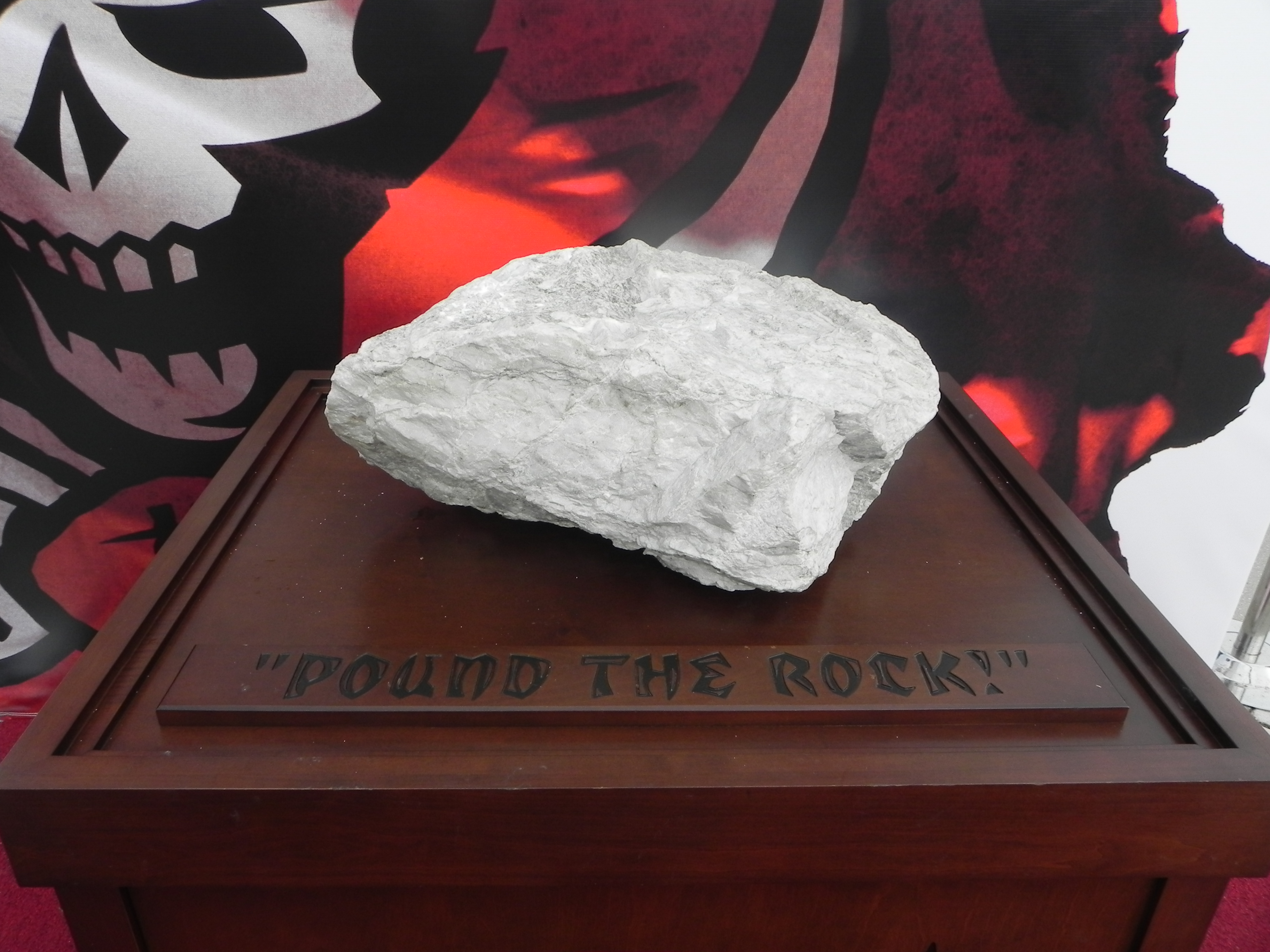
"Pound the rock!" was the slogan of the 2002 team

In January 2002, after losing in the wild card round to the Eagles for the second consecutive year, the Buccaneers fired head coach Tony Dungy. After that they began a prolonged search for his replacement. Potential candidates included Gators head coach (and former Buccaneers quarterback) Steve Spurrier, former Giants head coach Bill Parcells, Ravens defensive coordinator Marvin Lewis, and Raiders head coach Jon Gruden. Parcells passed on the offer, while Spurrier took the job at Washington. Tampa Bay general manager Rich McKay threw his support behind Lewis but the Glazers were displeased with the selection of yet another defensive-minded coach that they overruled McKay and took control of the candidate search themselves. They made it clear that their top choice was Gruden; however, he was still under contract with the Raiders. While talks with the Raiders were secretly underway, the Glazers publicly pursued 49ers head coach Steve Mariucci. But shortly thereafter, Al Davis agreed to release Gruden to Tampa Bay, but the move was costly. Tampa Bay paid Oakland with two first-round draft picks (2002, 2003), two second-round picks (2002, 2004) and $8 million in cash payments.

Upon his arrival in Tampa Bay, Gruden immediately went to work, acquiring former Jaguars WR Keenan McCardell, and RB Michael Pittman from the Cardinals. The Buccaneers needed to improve their sluggish offense, as the league's sweeping realignment sent them to the new NFC South division, along with Atlanta, Carolina and New Orleans. The offense made slight improvements during the season, but the strength of the team was the defense. The 2002 Buccaneers became the first team to lead the league in total defense, points allowed, and interceptions since the 1985 Chicago Bears. They also held opposing quarterbacks to an unbelievable 48.4 passer rating for the season.

Led by their dominating defense, the 2002 Buccaneers achieved their most successful season to date. On opening day, Gruden's new offense struggled, and lost in overtime to new division rival Saints. The team then rattled off five straight wins, including a shutout against the Ravens, a Monday night victory against the Rams, and a 35–7 drubbing of the Bengals. The team's first big test came in Week 7 at Philadelphia. The Eagles handled the Bucs, and Tampa Bay lost to their nemesis head-to-head for the fourth straight meeting. Quarterback Brad Johnson was knocked out of the game with a rib injury, and would miss the next game. Rob Johnson started at quarterback in Week 8, and despite offensive futility, emerged with a 12–9 win. Brad Johnson was back in the lineup, and guided Tampa Bay to three straight wins (throwing nine touchdown passes and zero interceptions over the three games) to improve to 9–2 on the season.

With a first-round bye, and possibly the top seed in the NFC in reach, Tampa Bay sputtered a bit during the month of December. A loss at New Orleans meant Tampa Bay was swept by the Saints. Then injuries piled up in Week 15 at Detroit. Brad Johnson was eventually sidelined with a back injury, Anthony McFarland was lost for the season with a broken foot, and other players including John Lynch and Keyshawn Johnson were banged up. Tampa Bay pulled out the victory against the Lions, and secured a playoff berth, but were forced to start third-string QB Shaun King on Monday night against the Steelers in Week 16. Which a chance to clinch the division and secure a first-round bye, King and the Bucs had a rough night, and were beat 17–7. The season came down to Week 17 against the Bears. A win would give the Bucs the #2 seed, but with Brad Johnson still out, and King performing poorly against the Steelers, Gruden reluctantly went with Rob Johnson. A loss would drop them to the #3 seed. Though they never reached the endzone, they returned home with a 15–0 shutout victory, the franchise's first win with the temperature at kickoff under 40 °F.

Tampa Bay won the NFC South title with the team's best ever record, 12–4, and then defeated the 49ers in the divisional round in what became coach Steve Mariucci's last game with that franchise. In a surprising upset, Tampa Bay won their first NFC Championship on the road against the Eagles in the last NFL game ever played at Veterans Stadium. Cornerback Ronde Barber capped off the win by intercepting a Donovan McNabb pass and returning it 92 yards for a touchdown late in the fourth quarter.

The Buccaneers went on to rout Gruden's former team, the Oakland Raiders, by a score of 48–21 in Super Bowl XXXVII. Gruden's familiarity with the Raiders’ players and playbook paid off, as John Lynch and other Buccaneer players recognized some of Oakland's formations and plays at crucial points in the game. The Bucs became the first team to win the Super Bowl without any picks in the first two rounds of the previous spring's draft, having traded these picks to the Oakland Raiders for the rights to acquire Gruden. At the time, Gruden made history by becoming the youngest head coach to win a Super Bowl.

== Offseason ==
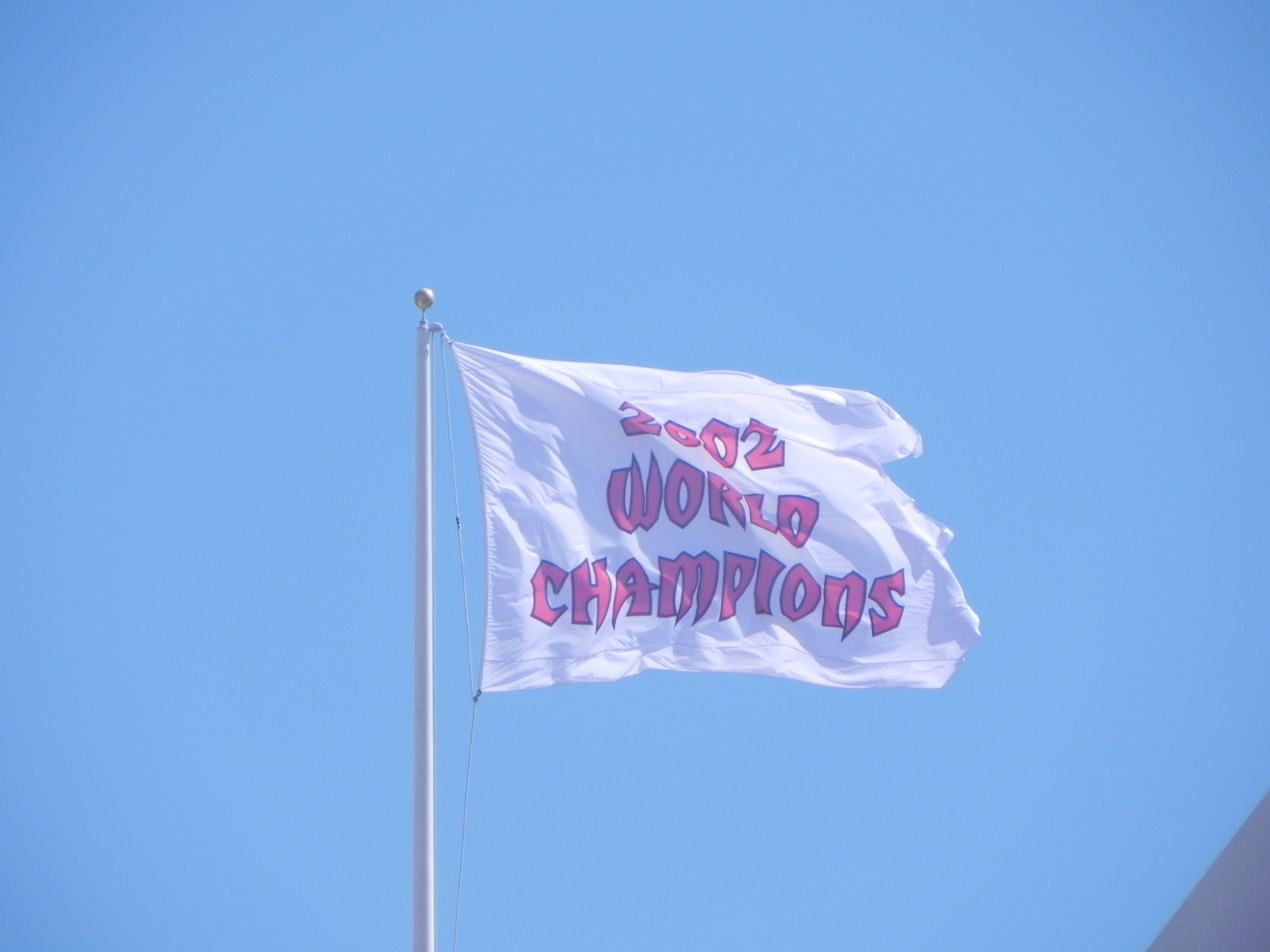
2002 World Champions flag located at Raymond James Stadium

Additions	Subtractions
P Tom Tupa (Jets)	CB Donnie Abraham (Jets)
TE Ken Dilger (Colts)	LB Jamie Duncan (Rams)
WR Keenan McCardell (Jaguars)	WR Jacquez Green (Redskins)
WR Joe Jurevicius (Giants)	TE Dave Moore (Bills)
QB Rob Johnson (Bills)	P Mark Royals (Dolphins)
RB Michael Pittman (Cardinals)	G Randall McDaniel (retirement)
TE Rickey Dudley (Browns)	LB Jeff Gooch (Lions)
DE Greg Spires (Browns)	
OT Roman Oben (Browns)	

=== 2002 expansion draft ===
Tampa Bay Buccaneers selected during the expansion draft
Round	Overall	Name	Position	Expansion team
—	14	Sean McDermott	Tight end	Houston Texans

=== 2002 NFL draft ===
2002 Tampa Bay Buccaneers draft
Round	Pick	Player	Position	College	Notes
1	21	–	–	–	Selection traded to Oakland Raiders
2	53	–	–	–	Selection traded to Oakland Raiders
3	86	Marquise Walker	Wide receiver	Michigan	
4	119	Travis Stephens	Running back	Tennessee	
5	157	Jermaine Phillips	Safety	Georgia	
6	193	John Stamper	Defensive end	South Carolina	
7	233	Tim Wansley	Cornerback	Georgia	
7	250	Tracey Wistrom	Tight end	Nebraska	
7	254	Aaron Lockett	Wide receiver	Kansas State	
7	255	Zack Quaccia	Center	Stanford	
Made roster

=== Undrafted free agents ===
2002 undrafted free agents of note
Player	Position	College
Mike Abrams	Punter	Virginia
Bennie Alexander	Cornerback	Florida
Howard Duncan	Guard	Oklahoma
Markese Fitzgerald	Cornerback	Miami (FL)
Zain Gilmore	Running back	Missouri
Andy Hogan	Long Snapper	Georgia
Ryan Nece	Linebacker	UCLA
Sterling Rogers	Linebacker	Southwest Texas State
Corey Smith	Defensive end	NC State
Justin Smith	Linebacker	Indiana
Glenn Sumter	Safety	Memphis
Jamal White	Linebacker	Kentucky

== Personnel ==
=== Staff / Coaches ===
2002 Tampa Bay Buccaneers staff
Front office: Owner/president – Malcolm Glazer; General manager – Rich McKay; Head coaches: Head coach – Jon Gruden; Assistant head coach/defensive line – Rod Marinelli; Offensive coaches: Offensive coordinator/offensive line – Bill Muir; Quarterbacks – Stan Parrish; Running backs – Kirby Wilson; Wide receivers – Richard Mann; Tight ends – Art Valero; Assistant offensive line – Michael Christianson; Offensive assistant – Jay Gruden; Offensive quality control – Jeremy Bates	Defensive coaches: Defensive coordinator – Monte Kiffin; Linebackers – Joe Barry; Defensive backs – Mike Tomlin; Defensive quality control – Raheem Morris; Special teams coaches: Special teams coordinator – Richard Bisaccia; Strength and conditioning: Director of player development – Cedric Saunders; Strength and conditioning – Johnny Parker; Assistant strength and conditioning – Mike Morris

=== Final roster ===
2002 Tampa Bay Buccaneers roster
Quarterbacks (QB): 14 Brad Johnson; 11 Rob Johnson; 10 Shaun King; Running backs (RB): 40 Mike Alstott FB; 30 Darian Barnes; 43 Jameel Cook FB; 32 Michael Pittman; 27 Aaron Stecker; Wide receivers (WR): 84 Reggie Barlow; 19 Keyshawn Johnson; 83 Joe Jurevicius; 81 Charles Lee; 87 Keenan McCardell; 86 Karl Williams PR; Tight ends (TE): 89 Casey Crawford; 85 Ken Dilger; 88 Rickey Dudley; 41 Daniel Wilcox; 80 Todd Yoder	Offensive linemen (OL): 75 Lomas Brown T; 62 Jeff Christy C; 60 Cosey Coleman G; 64 Dan Goodspeed T; 74 Cornell Green G; 71 Kerry Jenkins G; 72 Roman Oben T; 67 Kenyatta Walker T; 77 Todd Washington G/C; Defensive linemen (DL): 93 DeVone Claybrooks DT; 91 Chuck Darby DT; 90 Buck Gurley DT; 97 Simeon Rice DE; 99 Warren Sapp DT; 94 Greg Spires DE; 95 Ron Warner DE; 96 Ellis Wyms DE	Linebackers (LB): 55 Derrick Brooks OLB; 58 Jack Golden OLB; 53 Shelton Quarles MLB; 51 Al Singleton OLB; 52 Nate Webster MLB; Defensive backs (DB): 20 Ronde Barber CB; 38 John Howell SS; 35 Corey Ivy CB; 34 Dexter Jackson FS; 25 Brian Kelly CB; 47 John Lynch SS; 23 Jermaine Phillips FS; 26 Dwight Smith CB/S; 31 Tim Wansley CB; Special teams (ST): 66 Ryan Benjamin LS; 7 Martín Gramática K; 9 Tom Tupa P	Practice squad: 16 Onome Ojo WR (PS/I); 54 Idris Price LB; 59 Justin Smith LB; 37 Dwayne Stukes S; 46 Tony Taylor RB; 18 T. T. Toliver WR; Reserve: 1 Joe Hamilton QB (IR); 92 Anthony McFarland DT (IR); 56 Ryan Nece LB (IR); 98 Corey Smith DE (IR); 45 Mike Solwold LS (IR); 36 Travis Stephens RB (IR); 48 Damian Vaughn TE (IR); 82 Marquise Walker WR (IR); Rookies in italics 53 active, 9 reserve, 5 practice squad

== Preseason ==
During the offseason, the Buccaneers signed a new deal with Walt Disney World, and moved their Training Camp from the University of Tampa to Disney's Wide World of Sports Complex outside of Orlando.

During the first preseason game against the Miami Dolphins on Monday night August 12, which served as Jon Gruden's first coached game (albeit preseason), Frank Murphy took the opening kickoff 95 yards for a touchdown. It was the Buccaneers' fifth kick return touchdown in the preseason, however, at the time, the team had still never returned a kickoff for a touchdown in the regular season (and would do so not until 2007).

=== Schedule ===
Week	Date	Opponent	Result	Record	Venue	Recap
1	August 12	Miami Dolphins	W 14–10	1–0	Raymond James Stadium	Recap
2	August 16	at Jacksonville Jaguars	W 20–0	2–0	Alltel Stadium	Recap
3	August 24	Washington Redskins	L 10–40	2–1	Raymond James Stadium	Recap
4	August 30	at Houston Texans	W 17–13	3–1	Reliant Stadium	Recap

== Regular season ==
=== Schedule ===
Week	Date	Opponent	Result	Record	Venue	Recap
1	September 8	New Orleans Saints	L 20–26 (OT)	0–1	Raymond James Stadium	Recap
2	September 15	at Baltimore Ravens	W 25–0	1–1	Ravens Stadium	Recap
3	September 23	St. Louis Rams	W 26–14	2–1	Raymond James Stadium	Recap
4	September 29	at Cincinnati Bengals	W 35–7	3–1	Paul Brown Stadium	Recap
5	October 6	at Atlanta Falcons	W 20–6	4–1	Georgia Dome	Recap
6	October 13	Cleveland Browns	W 17–3	5–1	Raymond James Stadium	Recap
7	October 20	at Philadelphia Eagles	L 10–20	5–2	Veterans Stadium	Recap
8	October 27	at Carolina Panthers	W 12–9	6–2	Ericsson Stadium	Recap
9	November 3	Minnesota Vikings	W 38–24	7–2	Raymond James Stadium	Recap
10	Bye					
11	November 17	Carolina Panthers	W 23–10	8–2	Raymond James Stadium	Recap
12	November 24	Green Bay Packers	W 21–7	9–2	Raymond James Stadium	Recap
13	December 1	at New Orleans Saints	L 20–23	9–3	Louisiana Superdome	Recap
14	December 8	Atlanta Falcons	W 34–10	10–3	Raymond James Stadium	Recap
15	December 15	at Detroit Lions	W 23–20	11–3	Ford Field	Recap
16	December 23	Pittsburgh Steelers	L 7–17	11–4	Raymond James Stadium	Recap
17	December 29	at Chicago Bears	W 15–0	12–4	Memorial Stadium	Recap

=== Game summaries ===
==== Week 1: vs. New Orleans Saints ====
Week 1: New Orleans Saints at Tampa Bay Buccaneers

Quarter	1	2	3	4	OT	Total
Saints	6	7	7	0	6	26
Buccaneers	0	3	7	10	0	20

at Raymond James Stadium, Tampa, Florida

- Date: September 8
- Game time: 4:15 p.m. EDT
- Game weather: Partly cloudy, 90 °F (32 °C)
- Game attendance: 65,554
- Referee: Dick Hantak
- TV announcers (Fox): Kenny Albert and Tim Green
- Recap, Game Book

Game information

First quarter

- NO – John Carney 28-yard field goal, 8:13. Saints 3–0. Drive: 13 plays, 65 yards, 6:47.
- NO – John Carney 41-yard field goal, 0:19. Saints 6–0. Drive: 11 plays, 50 yards, 4:45.

Second quarter

- TB – Martín Gramática 52-yard field goal, 13:20. Saints 6–3. Drive: 6 plays, 39 yards, 1:59.
- NO – Boo Williams 32-yard pass from Aaron Brooks (John Carney kick), 4:02. Saints 13–3. Drive: 7 plays, 64 yards, 4:22.

Third quarter

- TB – Keenan McCardell 4-yard pass from Brad Johnson (Martín Gramática kick), 11:34. Saints 13–10. Drive: 6 plays, 54 yards, 3:26.
- NO – Donte Stallworth 41-yard pass from Aaron Brooks (John Carney kick), 8:36. Saints 20–10. Drive: 6 plays, 82 yards, 2:58.

Fourth quarter

- TB – Joe Jurevicius 11-yard pass from Brad Johnson (Martín Gramática kick), 2:41. Saints 20–17. Drive: 12 plays, 73 yards, 2:29.
- TB – Martín Gramática 40-yard field goal, 0:00. Tied 20–20. Drive: 10 plays, 51 yards, 2:01.

Overtime

- NO – James Allen interception in the end zone, 2:50. Saints 26–20.

Top passers

- NO – Aaron Brooks – 24/42, 260 yards, 2 TD, INT
- TB – Brad Johnson – 28/52, 278 yards, 2 TD

Top rushers

- NO – Deuce McAllister – 31 rushes, 109 yards
- TB – Michael Pittman – 12 rushes, 50 yards

Top receivers

- NO – Joe Horn – 8 receptions, 108 yards
- TB – Keenan McCardell – 6 receptions, 63 yards, TD

Jon Gruden's era in Tampa Bay began at home against new division rival, the New Orleans Saints, a team they'd soundly beaten the year before. Though heralded for his offensive expertise, the Buccaneers offense sputtered and was anemic for the first three quarters. The Saints held a 20–10 lead late in the fourth quarter, while Tampa Bay's offense had only 161 yards through three periods, and quarterback Brad Johnson was sacked three times, on a hot, humid 90° afternoon.

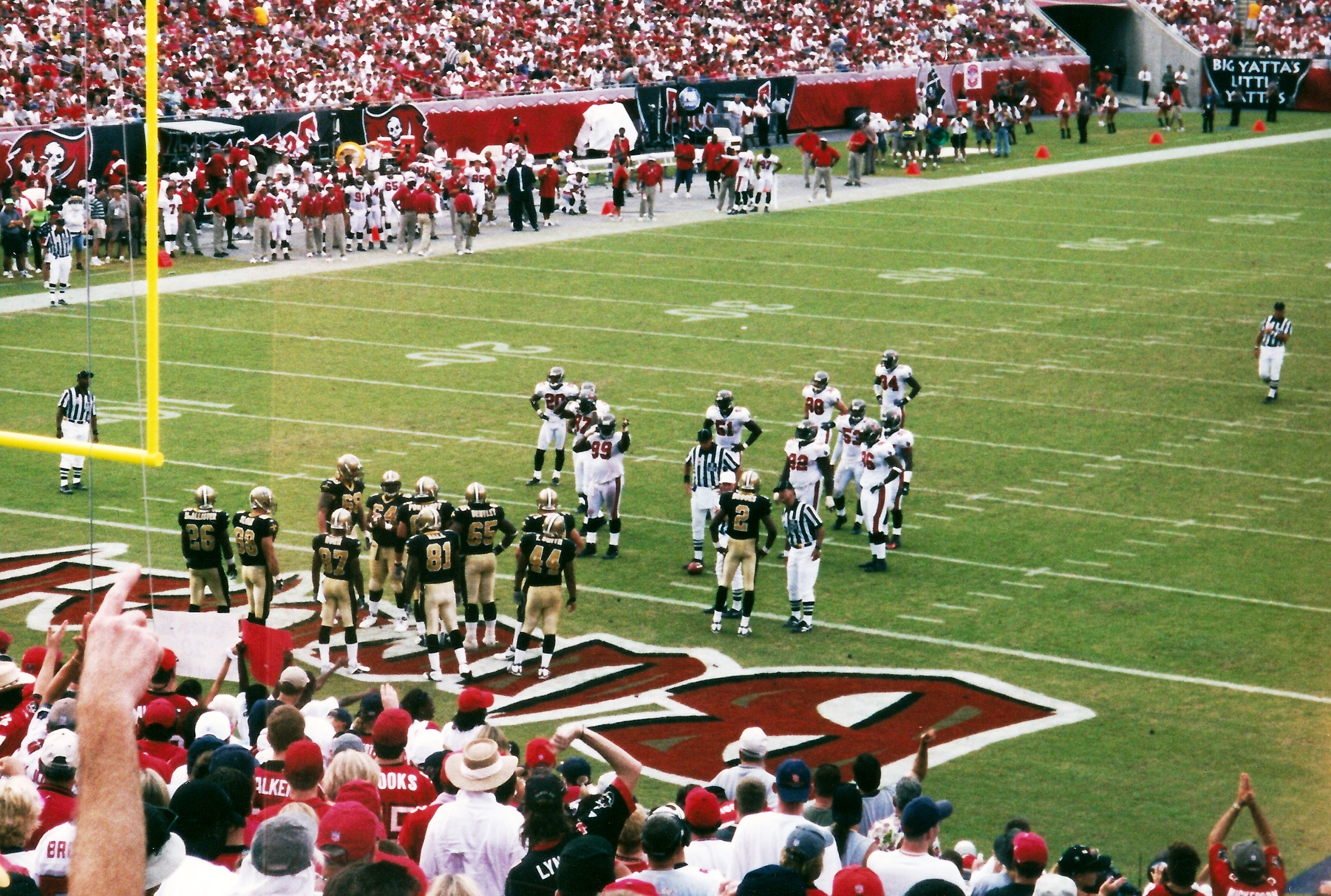
Game action between the Buccaneers and Saints at the 2002 Opening Day meeting.

With just under three minutes remaining, Brad Johnson led the Buccaneers on touchdown drive to narrow the score to 20–17. In the final two minutes, the offense finally performed, as Johnson drove the Buccaneers to the Saints 34-yard line. Tampa Bay faced 4th down with 23 seconds to go and counting, and no timeouts remaining. Martín Gramática hurried onto the field and kicked a game-tying field goal as time expired, and forced overtime.

Tied 20–20 in the overtime period, Tampa Bay received, and quickly drove to the Saints 39-yard line. With the choice of a field goal attempt of over 55 yards, Gruden elected to punt. The teams traded possession twice, and with just over 4 minutes remaining in the overtime, Tampa Bay was pinned back at their own 5-yard line. Tom Tupa attempted to punt on 4th down from the endzone, but Fred McAfee was unblocked. Tupa avoided the tackle, and attempted a desperation shovel pass to John Howell from his non-throwing arm. The ball was intercepted by James Allen, standing in the confines of the endzone, and the Saints were credited with a game-winning touchdown.

==== Week 2: at Baltimore Ravens ====
Week 2: Tampa Bay Buccaneers at Baltimore Ravens

Quarter	1	2	3	4	Total
Buccaneers	10	3	5	7	25
Ravens	0	0	0	0	0

at Ravens Stadium, Baltimore, Maryland

- Date: September 15
- Game time: 1:00 p.m. EDT
- Game weather: Partly Cloudy, 78 °F (26 °C)
- Game attendance: 69,304
- Referee: Terry McAulay
- TV announcers (Fox): Sam Rosen and Bill Maas
- Recap, Game Book

Game information

First quarter

- TB – Martín Gramática 36-yard field goal, 7:39. Buccaneers 3–0. Drive: 12 plays, 60 yards, 7:21.
- TB – Karl Williams 56-yard punt return (Martín Gramática kick), 1:54. Buccaneers 10–0.

Second quarter

- TB – Martin Gramatica 30-yard field goal, 3:51. Buccaneers 13–0. Drive: 17 plays, 82 yards, 8:25.

Third quarter

- TB – Chris Redman fumble out of bounds in the end zone for a safety, 14:44. Buccaneers 15–0.
- TB – Martin Gramatica 30-yard field goal, 8:13. Buccaneers 18–0. Drive: 11 plays, 48 yards, 6:31.

Fourth quarter

- TB – Derrick Brooks 97-yard interception return (Martín Gramática kick), 1:06. Buccaneers 25–0.

Top passers

- TB – Brad Johnson – 24/31, 211 yards
- BAL – Chris Redman – 16/38, 141 yards, INT

Top rushers

- TB – Michael Pittman – 13 rushes, 37 yards
- BAL – Jamal Lewis – 17 rushes, 53 yards

Top receivers

- TB – Michael Pittman – 6 receptions, 58 yards
- BAL – Brandon Stokley – 4 receptions, 57 yards

Tampa Bay rebounded in week 2 against the Baltimore Ravens. Karl Williams returned a punt 56 yards for a touchdown, and Martín Gramática scored three field goals. Derrick Brooks sealed the victory and secured the shutout with a 97-yard interception return touchdown with 1:06 to go.

Prior to the start of the game the Baltimore Ravens remembered Baltimore football legend Johnny Unitas in a variety of touching ways. Once the game began, Bucs passer Brad Johnson fashioned his own fitting tribute to the legendary quarterback.

On one of his best days as a Buccaneer, Johnson completed over 75% of his passes as Tampa Bay picked up a road win that was mostly devoid of tension. The Bucs shared in Baltimore's emotion during the pregame, then drained all drama from the game itself by sprinting out to a 10–0 lead and rarely letting Baltimore onto its half of the field.

Johnson completed all five of his passes on the Bucs’ opening drive, leading to a 36-yard Martin Gramatica field goal, and WR Karl Williams followed five minutes later with a 56-yard punt return for a touchdown. Staked to a 10–0 lead, Tampa Bay's defense needed no more, pitching just the second road shut out in franchise history (the first: a 35–0 victory at Cincinnati in 1998). The Bucs’ D, somewhat perturbed at its own performance in last Sunday's opener, even tied a bow on the affair in the final minutes when LB Derrick Brooks intercepted QB Chris Redman's pass at Tampa Bay's three and returned it 97 yards for a touchdown.

==== Week 3: vs. St. Louis Rams ====
Week 3: St. Louis Rams at Tampa Bay Buccaneers

Quarter	1	2	3	4	Total
Rams	7	0	0	7	14
Buccaneers	3	10	0	13	26

at Raymond James Stadium, Tampa, Florida

- Date: September 23
- Game time: 9:00 p.m. EDT
- Game weather: Cloudy, 79 °F (26 °C)
- Game attendance: 65,652
- Referee: Johnny Grier
- TV announcers (ABC): Al Michaels, John Madden and Melissa Stark
- Recap, Game Book

Game information

First quarter

- TB – Martín Gramática 39-yard field goal, 9:32. Buccaneers 3–0. Drive: 11 plays, 60 yards, 5:28.
- STL – Marshall Faulk 5-yard run (Jeff Wilkins kick), 4:28. Rams 7–3. Drive: 9 plays, 91 yards, 5:04.

Second quarter

- TB – Martín Gramática 47-yard field goal, 14:55. Rams 7–6. Drive: 10 plays, 44 yards, 4:33.
- TB – Rickey Dudley 9-yard pass from Brad Johnson (Martín Gramática kick), 0:57. Buccaneers 13–7. Drive: 6 plays, 56 yards, 3:33.

Third quarter

- No scoring plays.

Fourth quarter

- TB – Mike Alstott 2-yard run (pass failed), 10:42. Buccaneers 19–7. Drive: 2 plays, 1 yard, 0:45.
- STL – Lamar Gordon 21-yard run (Jeff Wilkins kick), 4:21. Buccaneers 19–14. Drive: 11 plays, 71 yards, 6:21.
- TB – Derrick Brooks 39-yard interception return (Martín Gramática kick), 0:59. Buccaneers 26–14.

Top passers

- STL – Kurt Warner – 30/45, 301 yards, 4 INT
- TB – Brad Johnson – 23/32, 199 yards, TD

Top rushers

- STL – Lamar Gordon – 4 rushes, 44 yards, TD
- TB – Michael Pittman – 11 rushes, 53 yards

Top receivers

- STL – Torry Holt – 12 receptions, 139 yards
- TB – Keyshawn Johnson – 4 receptions, 59 yards

On Monday night, the Buccaneers hosted the St. Louis Rams, continuing a brief, but budding rivalry between the two clubs. The Tampa Bay defense intercepted Kurt Warner four times, and held a 19–14 lead late in the fourth quarter.

With just over a minute to go, Warner drove the Rams to their 34-yard line, but Derrick Brooks intercepted his pass and returned it 39 yards for a touchdown, his second such score in two weeks. Tampa Bay won 26–14, and improved to 2–1.

==== Week 4: at Cincinnati Bengals ====
Week 4: Tampa Bay Buccaneers at Cincinnati Bengals

Quarter	1	2	3	4	Total
Buccaneers	0	21	7	7	35
Bengals	7	0	0	0	7

at Paul Brown Stadium, Cincinnati, Ohio

- Date: September 29
- Game time: 4:00 p.m. EDT
- Game weather: Fair & Sunny, 76 °F (24 °C)
- Game attendance: 57,234
- Referee: Gerry Austin
- TV announcers (Fox): Sam Rosen and Bill Maas
- Recap, Game Book

Game information

First quarter

- CIN – Brian Simmons 51-yard interception return (Neil Rackers kick), 2:23. Bengals 7–0.

Second quarter

- TB – Rickey Dudley 35-yard pass from Brad Johnson (Martín Gramática kick), 14:53. Tied 7–7. Drive: 5 plays, 66 yards, 2:30.
- TB – Keenan McCardell 65-yard pass from Brad Johnson (Martín Gramática kick), 7:34. Buccaneers 14–7. Drive: 2 plays, 70 yards, 0:39.
- TB – Shelton Quarles 25-yard interception return (Martín Gramática kick), 0:52. Buccaneers 21–7.

Third quarter

- TB – Ken Dilger 22-yard pass from Brad Johnson (Martín Gramática kick), 10:46. Buccaneers 28–7. Drive: 5 plays, 37 yards, 2:31.

Fourth quarter

- TB – Mike Alstott 1-yard run (Martín Gramática kick), 3:08. Buccaneers 35–7. Drive: 7 plays, 46 yards, 3:39.

Top passers

- TB – Brad Johnson – 19/30, 277 yards, 3 TD, 2 INT
- CIN – Akili Smith – 12/33, 117 yards, INT

Top rushers

- TB – Michael Pittman – 19 rushes, 54 yards
- CIN – Corey Dillon – 21 rushes, 59 yards

Top receivers

- TB – Keenan McCardell – 4 receptions, 108 yards, TD
- CIN – Peter Warrick – 4 receptions, 51 yards

Tampa Bay crushed the Bengals 35–7. Brad Johnson threw three touchdown passes (of 35 yards, 65 yards and 22 yards, respectively), while Shelton Quarles returned an interception 25 yards for a score (Tampa Bay's third defensive score in three weeks).

If the first quarter was a minor struggle, the rest of the game was relatively easy for the Buccaneers, as signified by the first play of the second period. Brad Johnson, who had yet another strong day, pump-faked left from the Bengals' 35-yard line, drawing coverage away from Rickey Dudley down the middle of the field. Johnson then lofted a perfect pass to a wide-open Dudley for a 35-yard touchdown. It was Dudley's second score in two games as a Buccaneer.

Six minutes and two possessions later, Johnson lofted a high floater on the left sideline to another wide-open man, Keenan McCardell. McCardell had no tacklers within 20 yards of him as he trotted into the end zone for a 65-yard score.

==== Week 5: at Atlanta Falcons ====
Week 5: Tampa Bay Buccaneers at Atlanta Falcons

Quarter	1	2	3	4	Total
Buccaneers	0	3	7	10	20
Falcons	3	0	3	0	6

at Georgia Dome, Atlanta, Georgia

- Date: October 6
- Game time: 1:00 p.m. EDT
- Game weather: None (indoor stadium)
- Game attendance: 68,936
- Referee: Bill Carollo
- TV announcers (Fox): Kenny Albert and Tim Green
- Recap, Game Book

Game information

First quarter

- ATL – Jay Feely 34-yard field goal, 7:05. Falcons 3–0. Drive: 6 plays, 16 yards, 3:14.

Second quarter

- TB – Martín Gramática 23-yard field goal, 8:03. Tied 3–3. Drive: 14 plays, 56 yards, 6:39.

Third quarter

- ATL – Jay Feely 32-yard field goal, 6:18. Falcons 6–3. Drive: 6 plays, 43 yards, 2:56.
- TB – Keyshawn Johnson 76-yard pass from Brad Johnson (Martín Gramática kick), 4:32. Buccaneers 10–6. Drive: 3 plays, 80 yards, 1:46.

Fourth quarter

- TB – Martin Gramatica 22-yard field goal, 6:31. Buccaneers 13–6. Drive: 10 plays, 49 yards, 4:54.
- TB – Derrick Brooks 15-yard interception return (Martín Gramática kick), 6:14. Buccaneers 20–6.

Top passers

- TB – Brad Johnson– 17/31, 261 yards, TD, INT
- ATL – Doug Johnson – 13/25, 150 yards, 3 INT

Top rushers

- TB – Michael Pittman – 19 rushes, 62 yards
- ATL – T. J. Duckett – 11 rushes, 52 yards

Top receivers

- TB – Keyshawn Johnson – 6 receptions, 131 yards, TD
- ATL – Brian Finneran – 5 receptions, 61 yards

Tampa Bay visited another new division rival, the Atlanta Falcons. The Buccaneer defense dominated yet another game, holding the Falcons to only 3 first half points, despite giving up good field position (the Falcons had a 47-yard kickoff return, a fumble recovery and a recovered onside kick).

On the first drive of the third quarter, quarterback Michael Vick was knocked out of the game after a sack by Simeon Rice. Doug Johnson took over at quarterback for the Falcons, and did not fare well. Though the Falcons took a 6–3 lead midway through the third period, the lead was short-lived. Three plays later, Brad Johnson connected on a 76-yard touchdown pass to Keyshawn Johnson, and a 10–6 lead. After a Martín Gramática field goal stretched the lead to 13–6, Tampa Bay pinned the Falcons on their own 16-yard line with 6:24 to go in the game. Doug Johnson was being sacked but got the ball off, which was, in turn, intercepted by Warren Sapp at the Atlanta 15-yard line. Sapp lateraled to Derrick Brooks who then ran for a touchdown. It was Tampa Bay's fourth consecutive game with a defensive score, and Brook's third of the season.

Tampa Bay won by a final score of 20–6, and improved to 4–1.

==== Week 6: vs. Cleveland Browns ====
Week 6: Cleveland Browns at Tampa Bay Buccaneers

Quarter	1	2	3	4	Total
Browns	0	0	0	3	3
Buccaneers	7	3	0	7	17

at Raymond James Stadium, Tampa, Florida

- Date: October 13
- Game time: 1:00 p.m. EDT
- Game weather: Partly Cloudy, 85 °F (29 °C)
- Game attendance: 65,627
- Referee: Tom White
- TV announcers (CBS): Dick Enberg, Dan Dierdorf and Bonnie Bernstein
- Recap, Game Book

Game information

First quarter

- TB – Mike Alstott 1-yard run (Martín Gramática kick), 9:01. Buccaneers 7–0. Drive: 5 plays, 80 yards, 2:57.

Second quarter

- TB – Martín Gramática 33-yard field goal, 2:41. Buccaneers 10–0. Drive: 5 plays, 12 yards, 2:17.

Third quarter

- No scoring plays.

Fourth quarter

- TB – Mike Alstott 17-yard run (Martín Gramática kick), 14:51. Buccaneers 17–0. Drive: 5 plays, 55 yards, 2:19.
- CLE – Phil Dawson 50-yard field goal, 11:45. Buccaneers 17–3. Drive: 9 plays, 42 yards, 3:06.

Top passers

- CLE – Tim Couch – 20/40, 151 yards, INT
- TB – Brad Johnson – 15/32, 194 yards, INT

Top rushers

- CLE – Jamel White – 9 rushes, 38 yards
- TB – Mike Alstott – 17 rushes, 126 yards, 2 TD

Top receivers

- CLE – Dennis Northcutt – 4 receptions, 74 yards
- TB – Michael Pittman – 5 receptions, 95 yards

Tampa Bay hosted Cleveland, and notched their first ever win against the Browns franchise (having lost all five meetings against the pre-1996 club) by a score of 17–3. Fullback Mike Alstott was the most notable player of the day, rushing 17 times for 126 yards and two touchdowns. In the fourth quarter, Alstott rumbled 19 yards, shaking at least seven tackles, for one of the more memorable plays of his career.

Despite the convincing win, the Buccaneers kicking game suffered several woes. One field goal attempt was blocked, one sailed wide left, and another was foiled by a botched snap. A light rain doused the stadium in the second half.

==== Week 7: at Philadelphia Eagles ====
Week 7: Tampa Bay Buccaneers at Philadelphia Eagles

Quarter	1	2	3	4	Total
Buccaneers	7	0	3	0	10
Eagles	3	7	3	7	20

at Veterans Stadium, Philadelphia, Pennsylvania

- Date: October 20
- Game time: 4:15 p.m. EDT
- Game weather: Cloudy, 57 °F (14 °C)
- Game attendance: 65,523
- Referee: Ron Winter
- TV announcers (Fox): Dick Stockton, Cris Collinsworth, Troy Aikman and Pam Oliver
- Recap, Game Book

Game information

First quarter

- PHI – David Akers 30-yard field goal, 10:29. Eagles 3–0. Drive: 4 plays, 2 yards, 1:20.
- TB – Derrick Brooks 11-yard interception return (Martín Gramática kick), 5:39. Buccaneers 7–3.

Second quarter

- PHI – Todd Pinkston 42-yard pass from Donovan McNabb (David Akers kick), 2:29. Eagles 10–7. Drive: 2 plays, 45 yards, 0:41.

Third quarter

- PHI – David Akers 36-yard field goal, 6:22. Eagles 13–7. Drive: 11 plays, 45 yards, 4:56.
- TB – Martin Gramatica 48-yard field goal, 2:39. Eagles 13–10. Drive: 9 plays, 50 yards, 3:43.

Fourth quarter

- PHI – Donovan McNabb 1-yard run (David Akers kick), 8:18. Eagles 20–10. Drive: 10 plays, 42 yards, 5:37.

Top passers

- TB – Brad Johnson – 19/31, 124 yards, INT
- PHI – Donovan McNabb – 12/25, 127 yards, TD, INT

Top rushers

- TB – Michael Pittman – 12 rushes, 49 yards
- PHI – Duce Staley – 24 rushes, 152 yards

Top receivers

- TB – Keenan McCardell – 5 receptions, 32 yards
- PHI – Todd Pinkston – 4 receptions, 61 yards, TD

Derrick Brooks recovered and returned a Donovan McNabb fumble for a touchdown (his fourth defensive score of the season), but Tampa Bay could not prevail over the Eagles at Veterans Stadium, falling 20–10. It marked the third straight loss at Veterans Stadium for the Buccaneers, and the fourth straight loss overall to the Eagles.

Early in the game, quarterback Brad Johnson suffered a rib injury, but managed to stay in the game. With 14 minutes to go, physically beaten and exhausted, Johnson lofted a pass intended for Keyshawn Johnson, and it was intercepted. He lacked strength due to the bruised rib. Brad Johnson was benched and would not return to the game. The turnover sealed the victory for the Eagles.

==== Week 8: at Carolina Panthers ====
Week 8: Tampa Bay Buccaneers at Carolina Panthers

Quarter	1	2	3	4	Total
Buccaneers	3	0	0	9	12
Panthers	0	3	6	0	9

at Ericsson Stadium, Charlotte, North Carolina

- Date: October 27
- Game time: 1:00 p.m. EST
- Game weather: Mostly cloudy, 70 °F (21 °C)
- Game attendance: 72,892
- Referee: Dick Hantak
- TV announcers (Fox): Dick Stockton, Cris Collinsworth, Troy Aikman and Pam Oliver
- Recap, Game Book

Game information

First quarter

- TB – Martín Gramática 32-yard field goal, 4:57. Buccaneers 3–0. Drive: 8 plays, 39 yards, 4:50.

Second quarter

- CAR – Shayne Graham 20-yard field goal, 10:52. Tied 3–3. Drive: 4 plays, 9 yards, 1:30.

Third quarter

- CAR – Shayne Graham 47-yard field goal, 8:44. Panthers 6–3. Drive: 12 plays, 44 yards, 6:46.
- CAR – Shayne Graham 39-yard field goal, 1:36. Panthers 9–3. Drive: 10 plays, 34 yards, 5:22.

Fourth quarter

- TB – Martin Gramatica 52-yard field goal, 10:05. Panthers 9–6. Drive: 9 plays, 30 yards, 3:00.
- TB – Martin Gramatica 53-yard field goal, 1:55. Tied 9–9. Drive: 4 plays, 7 yards, 1:06.
- TB – Martin Gramatica 47-yard field goal, 0:05. Buccaneers 12–9. Drive: 8 plays, 44 yards, 1:15.

Top passers

- TB – Rob Johnson – 22/33, 179 yards, INT
- CAR – Randy Fasani – 5/18, 46 yards, 3 INT

Top rushers

- TB – Michael Pittman – 12 rushes, 36 yards
- CAR – Lamar Smith – 22 rushes, 82 yards

Top receivers

- TB – Joe Jurevicius – 5 receptions, 55 yards
- CAR – Muhsin Muhammad – 3 receptions, 31 yards

Rob Johnson started for the injured Brad Johnson, and managed to guide the Buccaneers to a tough 12–9 win over the Carolina Panthers. Martín Gramática hit four field goals (32, 52, 53, and 47 yards respectively) for Tampa Bay's only points.

In the final minute, tied 9–9, Rob Johnson drove the Buccaneers into Carolina territory. With 21 seconds to go, Johnson scrambled for a 9-yard run, and was pushed out of bounds at the Carolina 35. But he was injured on the play. Third-string quarterback Shaun King scurried off the bench cold, and delivered a clutch 7-yard pass to Karl Williams. With 5 seconds to go, Gramatica kicked the game-winning field goal.

==== Week 9: vs. Minnesota Vikings ====
Week 9: Minnesota Vikings (2–5) at Tampa Bay Buccaneers (6–2) – Game summary

Quarter	1	2	3	4	Total
Vikings	0	10	7	7	24
Buccaneers	14	10	7	7	38

at Raymond James Stadium, Tampa, Florida

- Date: November 3
- Game time: 1:00 p.m. EST
- Game weather: Partly cloudy, 77 °F (25 °C)
- Game attendance: 65,667
- Referee: Jeff Triplette
- TV announcers (Fox): Kenny Albert and Tim Green
- Recap, Game Book

Game information

First quarter

- TB – Karl Williams 15-yard pass from Brad Johnson (Martín Gramática kick), 13:12. Buccaneers 7–0. Drive: 3 plays, 21 yards, 1:41.
- TB – Rickey Dudley 2-yard pass from Brad Johnson (Martín Gramática kick), 1:03. Buccaneers 14–0. Drive: 12 plays, 86 yards, 6:09.

Second quarter

- TB – Martín Gramática 36-yard field goal, 12:19. Buccaneers 17–0. Drive: 6 plays, 30 yards, 2:41.
- TB – Keyshawn Johnson 2-yard pass from Brad Johnson (Martín Gramática kick), 7:16. Buccaneers 24–0. Drive: 5 plays, 84 yards, 1:52.
- MIN – Michael Bennett 85-yard run (Gary Anderson kick), 6:49. Buccaneers 24–7. Drive: 1 play, 75 yards, 0:27.
- MIN – Gary Anderson 26-yard field goal, 0:00. Buccaneers 24–10. Drive: 8 plays, 61 yards, 2:02.

Third quarter

- TB – Keyshawn Johnson 19-yard pass from Brad Johnson (Martín Gramática kick), 5:10. Buccaneers 31–10. Drive: 6 plays, 82 yards, 3:59.
- MIN – Moe Williams 1-yard run (Gary Anderson kick), 2:08. Buccaneers 31–17. Drive: 6 plays, 64 yards, 3:02.

Fourth quarter

- TB – Mike Alstott 5-yard pass from Brad Johnson (Martín Gramática kick), 13:34. Buccaneers 38–17. Drive: 6 plays, 46 yards, 3:17.
- MIN – Moe Williams 1-yard run (Gary Anderson kick), 4:40. Buccaneers 38–24. Drive: 11 plays, 88 yards, 5:43.

Top passers

- MIN – Daunte Culpepper – 18/29, 225 yards, 2 INT
- TB – Brad Johnson – 24/31, 313 yards, 5 TD

Top rushers

- MIN – Michael Bennett – 10 rushes, 114 yards, TD
- TB – Mike Alstott – 26 rushes, 55 yards

Top receivers

- MIN – Jim Kleinsasser – 3 receptions, 64 yards
- TB – Keyshawn Johnson – 9 receptions, 133 yards, 2 TD

Brad Johnson returned to the lineup, throwing five touchdown passes (including two to Keyshawn Johnson), and a total of 313 yards, as the Buccaneers rolled 38–24 over the visiting Vikings.

Under Brad Johnson's jersey on Sunday was a flak jacket, designed to protect the two fractured ribs on his left side.

With the win, the Buccaneers moved to 7–2, tying the 1979 team for the best start in franchise history. With Green Bay (6–1) playing on Monday night and New Orleans (6–2) having the week off, Tampa Bay was the first NFC team to reach seven wins. They held a half-game edge over the Saints in the NFC South race

==== Week 11: vs. Carolina Panthers ====
Week 11: Carolina Panthers at Tampa Bay Buccaneers

Quarter	1	2	3	4	Total
Panthers	7	3	0	0	10
Buccaneers	0	10	7	6	23

at Raymond James Stadium, Tampa, Florida

- Date: November 17
- Game time: 4:00 p.m. EST
- Game weather: Windy, partly cloudy, 64 °F (18 °C)
- Game attendance: 65,527
- Referee: Bob McElwee
- TV announcers (Fox): Curt Menefee and Tim Ryan
- Recap, Game Book

Game information

First quarter

- CAR – Steve Smith 20-yard pass from Rodney Peete (Shayne Graham kick), 6:06. Panthers 7–0. Drive: 9 plays, 70 yards, 5:45.

Second quarter

- TB – Keyshawn Johnson 1-yard pass from Brad Johnson (Martín Gramática kick), 9:27. Tied 7–7. Drive: 13 plays, 86 yards, 6:23.
- CAR – Shayne Graham 42-yard field goal, 6:25. Panthers 10–7. Drive: 4 plays, 4 yards, 1:21.
- TB – Martín Gramática 20-yard field goal, 3:00. Tied 10–10. Drive: 8 plays, 59 yards, 3:25.

Third quarter

- TB – Keenan McCardell 22-yard pass from Brad Johnson (Martín Gramática kick), 1:28. Buccaneers 17–10. Drive: 2 plays, 19 yards, 0:52.

Fourth quarter

- TB – Martín Gramática 32-yard field goal, 8:03. Buccaneers 20–10. Drive: 12 plays, 54 yards, 6:38.
- TB – Martín Gramática 41-yard field goal, 3:57. Buccaneers 23–10. Drive: 7 plays, 8 yards, 3:52.

Top passers

- CAR – Rodney Peete – 22/38, 205 yards, TD, 3 INT
- TB – Brad Johnson – 22/40, 253 yards, 2 TD

Top rushers

- CAR – Lamar Smith – 15 rushes, 46 yards
- TB – Michael Pittman – 21 rushes, 57 yards

Top receivers

- CAR – Dee Brown – 6 receptions, 44 yards
- TB – Keyshawn Johnson – 7 receptions, 74 yards, TD

Brad Johnson threw two touchdown passes, and Martín Gramática kicked three field goals, in a 23–10 win over the Panthers. The Buccaneers swept the season series with Carolina, and posted a franchise-best 8–2 start.

The Bucs reached that franchise high-water mark on Sunday with a 23–10 victory over Carolina, in the process moving into a tie with former division rival Green Bay for the best record in the NFL. Tampa Bay and Green Bay square off for sole possession of the league's best mark next Sunday in Raymond James Stadium.

After the Bucs defeated Carolina, 12–9, in an "ugly" game three weeks ago in Charlotte, the rematch was billed as another defensive struggle, though with a twist. While this was indeed a matchup of the league's first and third-ranked defenses, it also marked the returns of starting quarterbacks Brad Johnson and Rodney Peete, each of whom missed the last game between the two. Statistically, Johnson and the Bucs’ defense came out on top, though Bucs head coach Jon Gruden complimented the Panthers' work, as well.

==== Week 12: vs. Green Bay Packers ====
Week 12: Green Bay Packers at Tampa Bay Buccaneers

Quarter	1	2	3	4	Total
Packers	7	0	0	0	7
Buccaneers	0	3	11	7	21

at Raymond James Stadium, Tampa, Florida

- Date: November 24
- Game time: 4:15 p.m. EST
- Game weather: Clear, 70 °F (21 °C)
- Game attendance: 65,672
- Referee: Johnny Grier
- TV announcers (Fox): Joe Buck, Troy Aikman, Chris Collinsworth and Pam Oliver
- Recap, Game Book

Game information

First quarter

- GB – Donald Driver 4-yard pass from Brett Favre (Ryan Longwell kick), 5:44. Packers 7–0. Drive: 6 plays, 30 yards, 2:57.

Second quarter

- TB – Martín Gramática 38-yard field goal, 0:00. Packers 7–3. Drive: 3 plays, 39 yards, 0:23.

Third quarter

- TB – Martín Gramática 51-yard field goal, 7:33. Packers 7–6. Drive: 7 plays, 27 yards, 2:57.
- TB – Joe Jurevicius 4-yard pass from Brad Johnson (Brad Johnson–Keyshawn Johnson pass), 5:00. Buccaneers 14–7. Drive: 4 plays, 18 yards, 2:13.

Fourth quarter

- TB – Ken Dilger 3-yard pass from Brad Johnson (Martín Gramática kick), 7:24. Buccaneers 21–7. Drive: 3 plays, 2 yards, 1:18.

Top passers

- GB – Brett Favre – 20/38, 196 yards, TD, 4 INT
- TB – Brad Johnson – 15/25, 134 yards, 2 TD

Top rushers

- GB – Ahman Green – 18 rushes, 56 yards
- TB – Michael Pittman – 13 rushes, 50 yards

Top receivers

- GB – Terry Glenn – 4 receptions, 61 yards
- TB – Joe Jurevicius – 5 receptions, 41 yards

Longtime rival Green Bay came to Raymond James Stadium, with the best record in the NFC on the line. In the first quarter, Brett Favre connected on a touchdown pass to Donald Driver to take the lead 7–0. Tampa Bay scored a field goal at the end of the first half, and the score was 7–3 at halftime. The Buccaneers scored another field goal in the third quarter, narrowing the deficit to 7–6.

On the first play of the next drive, Favre was intercepted by Brian Kelly, who returned the ball to the Packers 18-yard line. During the return, Chad Clifton was jogging downfield away from the main action and was blindsided by Warren Sapp. Clifton laid motionless on the field for several minutes and was carted off the field with a season-ending pelvic injury. The turnover led to a Brad Johnson touchdown pass to Joe Jurevicius, followed by a two-point conversion catch by Keyshawn Johnson, and a 14–7 lead.

Ronde Barber, Dexter Jackson, and Brian Kelly intercepted three more Favre passes, and Tampa Bay won convincingly 21–7. At 9–2, the Buccaneers stood with the best record in the NFC conference. After the game, Sapp and Packers coach Mike Sherman were involved in a confrontation on the field, exchanging heated words. The Sapp hit was regarded by some as a cheap shot, but Clifton would recover fully from the injury, and Sapp defended his actions, and was not penalized by the league.

==== Week 13: at New Orleans Saints ====
Week 13: Tampa Bay Buccaneers at New Orleans Saints

Quarter	1	2	3	4	Total
Buccaneers	2	7	3	8	20
Saints	0	6	14	3	23

at Louisiana Superdome, New Orleans, Louisiana

- Date: December 1
- Game time: 8:30 p.m. EST/7:30 p.m. CST
- Game weather: None (indoor stadium)
- Game attendance: 68,226
- Referee: Mike Carey
- TV announcers (WFTS/ESPN): Mike Patrick, Joe Theismann, Paul Maguire and Suzy Kolber
- Recap, Game Book

Game information

First quarter

- TB – Aaron Brooks fumble forced by Simeon Rice out of bounds in end zone for a safety, 3:17. Buccaneers 2–0.

Second quarter

- NO – Deuce McAllister 6-yard run (run failed), 10:02. Saints 6–2. Drive: 10 plays, 80 yards, 5:12.
- TB – Mike Alstott 44-yard pass from Brad Johnson (Martín Gramática kick), 6:51. Buccaneers 9–6. Drive: 6 plays, 90 yards, 3:11.

Third quarter

- NO – Jake Reed 3-yard pass from Aaron Brooks (John Carney kick), 12:56. Saints 13–9. Drive: 6 plays, 54 yards, 2:04.
- NO – Joe Horn 14-yard pass from Aaron Brooks (John Carney kick), 9:00. Saints 20–9. Drive: 3 plays, 20 yards, 1:31.
- TB – Martín Gramática 51-yard field goal, 5:04. Saints 20–12. Drive: 9 plays, 39 yards, 3:56.

Fourth quarter

- NO – John Carney 48-yard field goal, 9:47. Saints 23–12. Drive: 4 plays, 3 yards, 1:35.
- TB – Keenan McCardell 2-yard pass from Brad Johnson (Brad Johnson–Keyshawn Johnson pass), 2:49. Saints 23–20. Drive: 17 plays, 84 yards, 6:58.

Top passers

- TB – Brad Johnson – 28/44, 276 yards, 2 TD, INT
- NO – Aaron Brooks – 9/25, 155 yards, 2 TD

Top rushers

- TB – Michael Pittman & Mike Alstott – 8 rushes, 17 yards each
- NO – Deuce McAllister – 27 rushes, 99 yards, TD

Top receivers

- TB – Keenan McCardell – 11 receptions, 107 yards, TD
- NO – Joe Horn – 5 receptions, 106 yards, TD

Mike Alstott scored a 44-yard touchdown catch, and Keenan McCardell caught another late in the game, but the Buccaneers fell to the Saints, 23–20 on Sunday Night Football. Brad Johnson was intercepted once, lost a fumble, and Aaron Stecker lost another fumble, as the Saints swept Tampa Bay for the season.

The Bucs, leading the NFL in turnover differential entering the weekend, had a difficult time holding onto the ball, fumbling four times and losing two of those loose balls. QB Brad Johnson was also intercepted for the first time in four games, and those three giveaways, plus a pair of long returns by Michael Lewis in the third quarter turned a 9–6 halftime lead into a 20–9 deficit. It was a lead the Saints never relinquished.

Brooks got off to a slow start, completing just one pass for two yards in the first quarter, but he heated up in the second and third periods, engineering one first-half touchdown drive and throwing two scoring passes in the third quarter. By the end of the game, he had a strange mix of numbers, completing just nine of 25 passes for 155 yards but throwing two touchdowns and no picks. Added to his two-touchdown day in a season-opening, 26–20, overtime Saints win in Tampa, Brooks has four TD passes against Tampa Bay this season; the rest of the league has three in 10 games.

==== Week 14: vs. Atlanta Falcons ====
Week 14: Atlanta Falcons at Tampa Bay Buccaneers

Quarter	1	2	3	4	Total
Falcons	0	3	0	7	10
Buccaneers	0	21	6	7	34

at Raymond James Stadium, Tampa, Florida

- Date: December 8
- Game time: 1:00 p.m. EST
- Game weather: Partly Cloudy, 74 °F (23 °C)
- Game attendance: 65,648
- Referee: Tony Corrente
- TV announcers (Fox): Joe Buck, Troy Aikman, Chris Collinsworth and Pam Oliver
- Recap, Game Book

Game information

First quarter

- No scoring plays.

Second quarter

- TB – Joe Jurevicius 10-yard pass from Brad Johnson (Martín Gramática kick), 11:12. Buccaneers 7–0. Drive: 10 plays, 80 yards, 6:11.
- TB – Joe Jurevicius 13-yard pass from Brad Johnson (Martín Gramática kick), 7:42. Buccaneers 14–0. Drive: 2 plays, 10 yards, 0:31.
- ATL – Jay Feely 30-yard field goal, 2:02. Buccaneers 14–3. Drive: 11 plays, 48 yards, 5:40.
- TB – Keenan McCardell 14-yard pass from Brad Johnson (Martín Gramática kick), 0:34. Buccaneers 21–3. Drive: 6 plays, 80 yards, 1:28.

Third quarter

- TB – Martín Gramática 42-yard field goal, 9:56. Buccaneers 24–3. Drive: 10 plays, 55 yards, 5:04.
- TB – Martín Gramática 21-yard field goal, 5:20. Buccaneers 27–3. Drive: 8 plays, 66 yards, 3:21.

Fourth quarter

- ATL – Alge Crumpler 5-yard pass from Michael Vick (Jay Feely kick), 11:40. Buccaneers 27–10. Drive: 8 plays, 86 yards, 4:49.
- TB – Keenan McCardell 27-yard pass from Brad Johnson (Martín Gramática kick), 8:31. Buccaneers 34–10. Drive: 5 plays, 77 yards, 3:09.

Top passers

- ATL – Michael Vick – 12/25, 125 yards, TD, INT
- TB – Brad Johnson – 23/31, 276 yards, 4 TD

Top rushers

- ATL – T. J. Duckett – 13 rushes, 47 yards
- TB – Mike Alstott – 13 rushes, 95 yards

Top receivers

- ATL – Alge Crumpler – 2 receptions, 25 yards, TD
- TB – Joe Jurevicius – 8 receptions, 100 yards, 2 TD

Falcons quarterback Michael Vick entered the game with considerable pregame hype and an eight-game unbeaten streak. Vick, however, was sacked twice by Tampa Bay, and held to only 125 yards passing and a measly 15 yards rushing. Meanwhile, Brad Johnson connected on four touchdowns (two apiece to Jurevicius and McCardell) as the Buccaneers won 34–10.

In two games against Tampa Bay, Vick has completed just 16 passes for 162 yards, one touchdown and one interception. On October six, Vick completed just four of 12 passes for 37 yards before sustaining an injured shoulder on a third-down Simeon Rice sack. He was hit hard several times on this Sunday as well, as the Bucs’ pass rush was relentless, but never left the game.

Plus, any thought that the second-year scrambler would run wild on the Bucs’ defense effectively ended on the third play of the game when LB Derrick Brooks hit him square in the chest after a one-yard scramble. After rushing just one time for one yard in the first Bucs–Falcons contest, Vick ran five times.

With the victory, Tampa Bay maintained its grip on first place in the NFC South with three weeks remaining. By game's end, the Bucs had a 1.5-game lead on both Atlanta and New Orleans, though the Saints’ late-afternoon game would either expand Tampa Bay's edge to two games or shrink it to one. The Bucs also became the first NFL team to 10 wins, at 10–3, as the 9–3 Philadelphia Eagles and Green Bay Packers were also scheduled for later games.

==== Week 15: at Detroit Lions ====
Week 15: Tampa Bay Buccaneers at Detroit Lions

Quarter	1	2	3	4	Total
Buccaneers	3	10	0	10	23
Lions	0	10	3	7	20

at Ford Field, Detroit, Michigan

- Date: December 15
- Game time: 1:00 p.m. EST
- Game weather: None (indoor stadium)
- Game attendance: 61,942
- Referee: Tom White
- TV announcers (Fox): Curt Menefee and Tim Ryan
- Recap, Game Book

Game information

First quarter

- TB – Martín Gramática 20-yard field goal, 10:43. Buccaneers 3–0. Drive: 8 plays, 24 yards, 4:17.

Second quarter

- TB – Mike Alstott 1-yard run (Martín Gramática kick), 14:17. Buccaneers 10–0. Drive: 12 plays, 96 yards, 6:32.
- DET – Bill Schroeder 18-yard pass from Mike McMahon (Jason Hanson kick), 11:24. Buccaneers 10–7. Drive: 6 plays, 79 yards, 2:53.
- DET – Jason Hanson 37-yard field goal, 5:35. Tied 10–10. Drive: 6 plays, 43 yards, 3:06.
- TB – Martín Gramática 28-yard field goal, 0:17. Buccaneers 13–10. Drive: 14 plays, 67 yards, 5:18.

Third quarter

- DET – Jason Hanson 25-yard field goal, 12:02. Tied 13–13. Drive: 5 plays, 49 yards, 2:58.

Fourth quarter

- TB – Michael Pittman 4-yard run (Martín Gramática kick), 10:08. Buccaneers 20–13. Drive: 6 plays, 58 yards, 3:04.
- DET – Mike McMahon 2-yard run (Jason Hanson kick), 9:44. Tied 20–20. Drive: 1 play, 2 yards, 0:24.
- TB – Martín Gramática 38-yard field goal, 3:04. Buccaneers 23–20. Drive: 9 plays, 46 yards, 3:55.

Top passers

- TB – Brad Johnson – 24/41, 253 yards
- DET – Mike McMahon – 10/21, 158 yards, TD, INT

Top rushers

- TB – Mike Alstott – 11 rushes, 47 yards, TD
- DET – Aveion Cason – 10 rushes, 62 yards

Top receivers

- TB – Keyshawn Johnson – 6 receptions, 90 yards
- DET – Bill Schroeder – 4 receptions, 96 yards, TD

Mike Alstott and Michael Pittman each scored a rushing touchdown, but the visiting Buccaneers found themselves still tied 20–20 late in the fourth quarter with the 3–10 Lions. With 3:04 to go, Martín Gramática broke the tie with a 38-yard field goal, and Tampa Bay held on for a 23–20 victory.

Injuries plagued the Buccaneers that week, as John Lynch sat out the game with a neck strain. Keyshawn Johnson left the game with a groin injury, and Anthony McFarland broke his right foot and would miss the remainder of the season. Most notably, however, was quarterback Brad Johnson, who suffered a back injury during the game. He did not leave the game, but the severity of the injury was more significant than originally known. He would be sidelined during practice the following week.

==== Week 16: vs. Pittsburgh Steelers ====
Week 16: Pittsburgh Steelers at Tampa Bay Buccaneers

Quarter	1	2	3	4	Total
Steelers	17	0	0	0	17
Buccaneers	0	0	0	7	7

at Raymond James Stadium, Tampa, Florida

- Date: December 23
- Game time: 9:00 p.m. EST
- Game weather: Mild, increasing clouds, 64 °F (18 °C)
- Game attendance: 65,684
- Referee: Larry Nemmers
- TV announcers (ABC): Al Michaels, John Madden and Melissa Stark
- Recap, Game Book

Game information

First quarter

- PIT – Antwaan Randle El 11-yard pass from Tommy Maddox (Jeff Reed kick), 12:01. Steelers 7–0. Drive: 6 plays, 81 yards, 2:59.
- PIT – Chad Scott 30-yard interception return (Jeff Reed kick), 11:10. Steelers 14–0.
- PIT – Jeff Reed 26-yard field goal, 4:24. Steelers 17–0. Drive: 9 plays, 70 yards, 5:04.

Second quarter

- No scoring plays.

Third quarter

- No scoring plays.

Fourth quarter

- TB – Keyshawn Johnson 18-yard pass from Rob Johnson (Martín Gramática kick), 1:14. Steelers 17–7. Drive: 9 plays, 67 yards, 2:20.

Top passers

- PIT – Tommy Maddox – 17/23, 236 yards, TD
- TB – Rob Johnson – 12/18, 159 yards, TD

Top rushers

- PIT – Jerome Bettis – 26 rushes, 66 yards
- TB – Mike Alstott – 5 rushes, 28 yards

Top receivers

- PIT – Plaxico Burress – 5 receptions, 127 yards
- TB – Keyshawn Johnson – 8 receptions, 132 yards, TD

With Brad Johnson sidelined, backup quarterback Shaun King started against the Steelers on Monday night. Tampa Bay was rocked 17–7 by the visiting Steelers, the second consecutive season being beaten soundly at home by Pittsburgh.

The night started out on a rough note even before kickoff, as during pre-game warm-ups Warren Sapp skipped through the Steelers. Jerome Bettis shoved Sapp, and this was followed by a heated argument between the two teams. The Buccaneers had also been ridiculed by Steelers' Lethon Flowers as being "paper champions."

On the first play of the game, Tommy Maddox's pass to Plaxico Burress gained 41 yards to the Tampa Bay 40-yard line. The Steelers drove 81 yards in only six plays, as Maddox connected with Antwaan Randle El for an 11-yard touchdown. On the second play of Tampa Bay's first drive, King was intercepted by Chad Scott, who returned the ball 30 yards for a touchdown, and a 14–0 lead less than four minutes into the game.

Trailing 17–0, Tampa Bay kicker Martín Gramática made a 50-yard field goal, but it was negated by a Pittsburgh penalty, and instead Tampa Bay was awarded a first down at the Pittsburgh 28-yard line. Four plays later, however, Mike Alstott lost a fumble at the 7-yard line, and the Steelers took a 17–0 lead into halftime.

Shaun King was finally benched having thrown for 73 yards and an interception on a pitiful 9-for-26. Rob Johnson took over in the second half, and salvaged the remainder of the game. With 1:23 to go, Keyshawn Johnson caught a touchdown pass, and avoided the shutout.

==== Week 17: at Chicago Bears ====
Week 17: Tampa Bay Buccaneers (11–4) at Chicago Bears (4–11) – Game summary

Quarter	1	2	3	4	Total
Buccaneers	0	6	0	9	15
Bears	0	0	0	0	0

at Memorial Stadium, Champaign, Illinois

- Date: December 29
- Game time: 8:30 p.m. EST/7:30 p.m. CST
- Game weather: Partly Cloudy, 38 °F (3 °C)
- Game attendance: 55,832
- Referee: Bernie Kukar
- TV announcers (WFTS/ESPN): Mike Patrick, Joe Theismann, Paul Maguire and Suzy Kolber
- Recap, Game Book

Game information

First quarter

- No scoring plays.

Second quarter

- TB – Martín Gramática 30-yard field goal, 3:22. Buccaneers 3–0. Drive: 12 plays, 48 yards, 6:48.
- TB – Martín Gramática 32-yard field goal, 0:02. Buccaneers 6–0. Drive: 5 plays, 20 yards, 0:58.

Third quarter

- No scoring plays.

Fourth quarter

- TB – Martín Gramática 33-yard field goal, 13:12. Buccaneers 9–0. Drive: 15 plays, 65 yards, 8:10.
- TB – Martín Gramática 26-yard field goal, 7:01. Buccaneers 12–0. Drive: 10 plays, 40 yards, 6:04.
- TB – Martín Gramática 33-yard field goal, 3:09. Buccaneers 15–0. Drive: 4 plays, 3 yards, 0:25.

Top passers

- TB – Rob Johnson – 16/25, 134 yards
- CHI – Henry Burris – 7/19, 78 yards, 4 INT

Top rushers

- TB – Michael Pittman – 21 rushes, 90 yards
- CHI – Adrian Peterson – 7 rushes, 42 yards

Top receivers

- TB – Keyshawn Johnson – 5 receptions, 41 yards
- CHI – Marty Booker – 4 receptions, 25 yards

In the final week of the season, Tampa Bay traveled to Memorial Stadium in Champaign, Illinois, to meet the Chicago Bears. A win would secure the #2 seed and a first-round bye in the playoffs following the Green Bay Packers losing to the New York Jets earlier in the day. Brad Johnson sat out for the second game in a row, and Rob Johnson started the game for Tampa Bay.

The temperature at kickoff was 38 °F or 3.3 °C, and Tampa Bay looked to snap a 0–21 record in games under 40 °F (4 °C). Rob Johnson passed for 134 yards and no interceptions, and Michael Pittman rushed for 90 yards, but the Buccaneers offense could not score a touchdown. Martín Gramática kicked a franchise-best five field goals out of five, and his 15 points were the only scores of the game. Bears quarterback Henry Burris was intercepted four times by Tampa Bay (twice by Brian Kelly, and once each by Derrick Brooks and Dwight Smith).

With the win, Tampa Bay secured a bye for the wild card round and recorded the club's first win with the temperature under 40°. The Buccaneers finished with a franchise-best 12–4 record, along with a club-best 6–2 road record.

=== Standings ===
==== Division ====
NFC South
	W	L	T	PCT	DIV	CONF	PF	PA	STK
^{(2)} Tampa Bay Buccaneers	12	4	0	.750	4–2	9–3	346	196	W1
^{(6)} Atlanta Falcons	9	6	1	.594	4–2	7–5	402	314	L1
New Orleans Saints	9	7	0	.563	3–3	7–5	432	388	L3
Carolina Panthers	7	9	0	.438	1–5	4–8	258	302	W2

==== Conference ====
NFC
#	Team	Division	W	L	T	PCT	DIV	CONF	SOS	SOV
Division leaders
1 (Note: Philadelphia finished ahead of Tampa Bay and Green Bay based on conference record (11–1 vs 9–3/9–3).)	Philadelphia Eagles	East	12	4	0	.750	5–1	11–1	.469	.432
2 (Note: Tampa Bay finished ahead of Green Bay based on head-to-head victory.)	Tampa Bay Buccaneers	South	12	4	0	.750	4–2	9–3	.482	.432
3	Green Bay Packers	North	12	4	0	.750	5–1	9–3	.451	.414
4	San Francisco 49ers	West	10	6	0	.625	5–1	8–4	.504	.450
Wild Cards
5	New York Giants	East	10	6	0	.625	5–1	8–4	.482	.450
6	Atlanta Falcons	South	9	6	1	.594	4–2	7–5	.494	.429
Did not qualify for the postseason
7	New Orleans Saints	South	9	7	0	.563	3–3	7–5	.498	.566
8 (Note: St. Louis finished ahead of Seattle based on division record (4–2 to 2–4).)	St. Louis Rams	West	7	9	0	.438	4–2	5–7	.508	.446
9	Seattle Seahawks	West	7	9	0	.438	2–4	5–7	.506	.433
10 (Note: Washington finished ahead of Carolina based on common games (2–3 to 1–4))	Washington Redskins	East	7	9	0	.438	1–5	4–8	.527	.438
11	Carolina Panthers	South	7	9	0	.438	1–5	4–8	.486	.357
12	Minnesota Vikings	North	6	10	0	.375	4–2	5–7	.498	.417
13 (Note: Arizona finished ahead of Dallas based on head-to-head victory.)	Arizona Cardinals	West	5	11	0	.313	1–5	5–7	.500	.400
14	Dallas Cowboys	East	5	11	0	.313	1–5	3–9	.500	.475
15	Chicago Bears	North	4	12	0	.250	2–4	3–9	.521	.430
16	Detroit Lions	North	3	13	0	.188	1–5	3–9	.494	.375
Tiebreakers (Note: When breaking ties for three or more teams under the NFL's rules, they are first broken within divisions, then comparing only the highest-ranked remaining team from each division.)

== Postseason ==
=== Schedule ===
Round	Date	Opponent (seed)	Result	Record	Venue	Recap
Wild Card	Bye					
Divisional	January 12	San Francisco 49ers (4)	W 31–6	1–0	Raymond James Stadium	Recap
NFC Championship	January 19	at Philadelphia Eagles (1)	W 27–10	2–0	Veterans Stadium	Recap
Super Bowl XXXVII	January 26	Oakland Raiders (A1)	W 48–21	3–0	Qualcomm Stadium	Recap

=== Game summaries ===
==== NFC Divisional Playoffs: vs. (4) San Francisco 49ers ====
NFC Divisional Playoffs: (4) San Francisco 49ers at (2) Tampa Bay Buccaneers – Game summary

Quarter	1	2	3	4	Total
49ers	3	3	0	0	6
Buccaneers	7	21	3	0	31

at Raymond James Stadium, Tampa, Florida

- Date: January 12, 2003
- Game time: 1:00 p.m. EST
- Game weather: Partly cloudy, 54 °F (12 °C)
- Game attendance: 65,599
- Referee: Gerry Austin
- TV announcers (Fox): Joe Buck, Troy Aikman, Cris Collinsworth and Pam Oliver
- Recap, Game Book

Game information

First quarter

- TB – Mike Alstott 2-yard run (Martín Gramática kick), 6:34. Buccaneers 7–0. Drive: 12 plays, 74 yards, 5:16.
- SF – Jeff Chandler 24-yard field goal, 0:17. Buccaneers 7–3. Drive: 12 plays, 63 yards, 6:17.

Second quarter

- TB – Joe Jurevicius 20-yard pass from Brad Johnson (Martín Gramática kick), 9:27. Buccaneers 14–3. Drive: 11 plays, 77 yards, 5:50.
- SF – Jeff Chandler 40-yard field goal, 8:31. Buccaneers 14–6. Drive: 5 plays, 24 yards, 0:56.
- TB – Rickey Dudley 12-yard pass from Brad Johnson (Martín Gramática kick), 7:24. Buccaneers 21–6. Drive: 2 plays, 52 yards, 1:07.
- TB – Mike Alstott 2-yard run (Martín Gramática kick), 0:50. Buccaneers 28–6. Drive: 4 plays, 26 yards, 1:10.

Third quarter

- TB – Martín Gramática 19-yard field goal, 8:28. Buccaneers 31–6. Drive: 10 plays, 36 yards, 6:16.

Fourth quarter

- No scoring plays.

Top passers

- SF – Jeff Garcia – 22/41, 193 yards, 3 INT
- TB – Brad Johnson – 15/31, 196 yards, 2 TD, INT

Top rushers

- SF – Garrison Hearst – 10 rushes, 55 yards
- TB – Mike Alstott – 17 rushes, 60 yards, 2 TD

Top receivers

- SF – Tai Streets – 5 receptions, 62 yards
- TB – Keyshawn Johnson – 5 receptions, 85 yards

The Buccaneers hosted the 49ers, who were fresh off of the second largest comeback game in NFL post-season history at the time in the 39–38 wildcard round victory over the Giants. With the league's top-ranked defense during the 2002 regular season, the Buccaneers forced five turnovers; they intercepted quarterback Jeff Garcia three times and sacked him four times, and limited the 49ers to only two field goals. Tampa Bay quarterback Brad Johnson, who had been sidelined for a month, returned to throw for 196 yards and two touchdowns. Fullback Mike Alstott scored two touchdowns, while the Buccaneers held onto the ball for 36:46 and held the 49ers to a season-low 228 yards. This was San Francisco's first playoff game without a touchdown since 1986 and the 49ers' last playoff game until 2011.

==== NFC Championship: at (1) Philadelphia Eagles ====
NFC Championship: (2) Tampa Bay Buccaneers at (1) Philadelphia Eagles – Game summary

Quarter	1	2	3	4	Total
Buccaneers	10	7	3	7	27
Eagles	7	3	0	0	10

at Veterans Stadium, Philadelphia, Pennsylvania

- Date: January 19, 2003
- Game time: 3:00 p.m. EST
- Game weather: Mostly cloudy, 26 °F (−3 °C)
- Game attendance: 66,713
- Referee: Terry McAulay
- TV announcers (Fox): Joe Buck, Troy Aikman, Cris Collinsworth and Pam Oliver
- Recap, Game Book

Game information

First quarter

- PHI – Duce Staley 20-yard run (David Akers kick), 14:08. Eagles 7–0. Drive: 2 plays, 26 yards, 0:52.
- TB – Martín Gramática 48-yard field goal, 9:58. Eagles 7–3. Drive: 9 plays, 37 yards, 4:10.
- TB – Mike Alstott 1-yard run (Martín Gramática kick), 0:40. Buccaneers 10–7. Drive: 7 plays, 96 yards, 3:15.

Second quarter

- PHI – David Akers 30-yard field goal, 8:04. Tied 10–10. Drive: 8 plays, 26 yards, 3:53.
- TB – Keyshawn Johnson 9-yard pass from Brad Johnson (Martín Gramática kick), 2:28. Buccaneers 17–10. Drive: 12 plays, 80 yards, 5:36.

Third quarter

- TB – Martín Gramática 27-yard field goal, 1:02. Buccaneers 20–10. Drive: 8 plays, 43 yards, 3:55.

Fourth quarter

- TB – Ronde Barber 92-yard interception return (Martín Gramática kick), 3:12. Buccaneers 27–10.

Top passers

- TB – Brad Johnson – 20/33, 259 yards, TD, INT
- PHI – Donovan McNabb – 26/49, 243 yards, INT

Top rushers

- TB – Mike Alstott – 17 rushes, 25 yards, TD
- PHI – Duce Staley – 13 rushes, 58 yards, TD

Top receivers

- TB – Michael Pittman – 5 receptions, 53 yards
- PHI – Chad Lewis – 6 receptions, 65 yards

Tampa Bay won a road playoff game for the first time in franchise history, and in temperatures below 32 °F or 0 °C, in the last football game played at Veterans Stadium. The Eagles were heavy favorites at home going into the game. The Eagles had beaten the Buccaneers four consecutive times, in the wild card round the two previous seasons, and also during regular-season games in 2001 and 2002. During the two playoff losses, both at Veterans Stadium, Tampa Bay had failed to score a single touchdown.

Eagles running back Brian Mitchell returned the opening kickoff 70 yards, setting up a 20-yard touchdown run by Duce Staley less than a minute into the game. Tampa Bay responded with Martín Gramática's 48-yard field goal on their ensuing drive. At the end of Philadelphia's next possession, Lee Johnson's punt pinned the Buccaneers back at their own 4-yard line. But Tampa Bay stormed 96 yards and scored with Mike Alstott's 1-yard touchdown run to take the lead. The key play on the drive was a 71-yard completion from Brad Johnson to Joe Jurevicius on third down and two from their own 24-yard line.

David Akers tied the score, 10–10, with a 30-yard field goal midway through the second quarter, but the Buccaneers responded with an 80-yard, 12-play drive that ended with a 9-yard touchdown pass from Brad Johnson to Keyshawn Johnson. With time running out in the half, Donovan McNabb led the Eagles to the Tampa Bay 24-yard line, only to lose a fumble while being sacked by his high school teammate Simeon Rice, who stripped the ball away and recovered it himself.

On the Eagles' first drive of the third quarter, McNabb lost another fumble due to a tackle from cornerback Ronde Barber, and Buccaneers defensive tackle Ellis Wyms recovered it. Later on, with 1:02 left in the third quarter, Gramatica's 27-yard field goal increased the Tampa Bay lead to 20–10. In the fourth quarter, the Eagles managed to drive 73 yards to Tampa Bay's 10-yard line, but Barber intercepted McNabb's pass with 3:12 left in the game and returned it 92 yards for a touchdown, clinching a trip to the Super Bowl for the first time in franchise history.

This was the last professional football game ever played at Veterans Stadium. The Eagles would move to Lincoln Financial Field for the 2003 season. The other team that occupied Veterans Stadium, the Philadelphia Phillies, would play the entire baseball season there in 2003 before they too left in 2004 to play in brand new Citizens Bank Park. As of 2024, both Philadelphia teams are still playing in those stadiums.

==== Super Bowl XXXVII: vs. (A1) Oakland Raiders ====
Super Bowl XXXVII: (A1) Oakland Raiders vs. (N2) Tampa Bay Buccaneers – Game summary

Quarter	1	2	3	4	Total
Raiders	3	0	6	12	21
Buccaneers	3	17	14	14	48

at Qualcomm Stadium, San Diego, California

- Date: January 26, 2003
- Game time: 6:26 p.m. EST/3:26 p.m. PST
- Game weather: Sunny, 81 °F (27 °C)
- Game attendance: 67,603
- Referee: Bill Carollo
- TV announcers (ABC): Al Michaels, John Madden, Melissa Stark and Andrea Kremer
- Recap, Game Book

Game information

First quarter

- OAK – Sebastian Janikowski 40-yard field goal, 10:40. Raiders 3–0. Drive: 7 plays, 14 yards, 2:55.
- TB – Martín Gramática 31-yard field goal, 7:51. Tied 3–3. Drive: 9 plays, 58 yards, 2:49.

Second quarter

- TB – Martín Gramática 43-yard field goal, 11:16. Buccaneers 6–3. Drive: 9 plays, 26 yards, 3:53.
- TB – Mike Alstott 2-yard run (Martín Gramática kick), 6:24. Buccaneers 13–3. Drive: 4 plays, 27 yards, 2:02.
- TB – Keenan McCardell 5-yard pass from Brad Johnson (Martín Gramática kick), 0:30. Buccaneers 20–3. Drive: 10 plays, 77 yards, 3:15.

Third quarter

- TB – Keenan McCardell 8-yard pass from Brad Johnson (Martín Gramática kick), 5:30. Buccaneers 27–3. Drive: 14 plays, 89 yards, 7:52.
- TB – Dwight Smith 44-yard interception return (Martín Gramática kick), 4:47. Buccaneers 34–3.
- OAK – Jerry Porter 39-yard pass from Rich Gannon (pass failed), 2:14. Buccaneers 34–9. Drive: 8 plays, 82 yards, 2:33.

Fourth quarter

- OAK – Eric Johnson 13-yard return of blocked punt (pass failed), 14:16. Buccaneers 34–15.
- OAK – Jerry Rice 48-yard pass from Rich Gannon (pass failed), 6:06. Buccaneers 34–21. Drive: 8 plays, 78 yards, 2:56.
- TB – Derrick Brooks 44-yard interception return (Martín Gramática kick), 1:18. Buccaneers 41–21.
- TB – Dwight Smith 50-yard interception return (Martín Gramática kick), 0:02. Buccaneers 48–21.

Top passers

- OAK – Rich Gannon – 22/44, 272 yards, 2 TD, 5 INT
- TB – Brad Johnson – 18/34, 215 yards, 2 TD, INT

Top rushers

- OAK – Charlie Garner – 7 rushes, 10 yards
- TB – Michael Pittman – 29 rushes, 124 yards

Top receivers

- OAK – Jerry Rice – 5 receptions, 77 yards, TD
- TB – Keyshawn Johnson – 6 receptions, 69 yards

The Tampa Bay Buccaneers won their first Super Bowl, routing the Oakland Raiders 48–21. The Buccaneers defense intercepted Rich Gannon a Super Bowl record five times, and returned three of the interceptions for touchdowns. Safety Dexter Jackson was named the game's MVP.

As many sports fans and writers predicted, Gruden's prior knowledge of the Raiders was a major factor in the Buccaneers’ win in Super Bowl XXXVII. The most damaging piece of evidence is NFL Films footage of Tampa Bay safety John Lynch telling his teammates during the game that almost all of the plays ran by Oakland's offense were plays that Gruden (who that week even played the part of "Rich Gannon" by playing quarterback with the scout-team offense) specifically told them to look out for. Better still for the Buccaneers was the fact that Oakland hadn't changed their audible-calling signals that Gruden himself had installed, thus tipping off plays repeatedly. As a result, Tampa Bay dominated Oakland, outgaining them in total yards (365 to 269), rushing yards (150 to 19), first downs (24 to 11), offensive plays (76 to 60), and forced turnovers (5 to 1).

The Raiders had a great chance to score a touchdown early in the game after cornerback Charles Woodson intercepted Buccaneers quarterback Brad Johnson's pass on the third play of the game and returned it 12 yards to the Tampa Bay 36-yard line. But 6 plays later, Tampa Bay defensive end Simeon Rice sacked Raiders quarterback Rich Gannon on third down, forcing Oakland to settle for kicker Sebastian Janikowski's 40-yard field goal to give them a 3–0 lead.

Buccaneers kick returner Aaron Stecker returned the ensuing kickoff 27 yards to the 29-yard line, then appeared to fumble the ball. Although the officials initially ruled that the ball was recovered by Oakland's Eric Johnson, the play was reviewed by instant replay and the fumble was overturned, and thus Tampa Bay retained possession.

On the first play of the drive, Brad Johnson completed an 11-yard pass to receiver Joe Jurevicius. Johnson's next 2 passes were incomplete, but he then completed a 23-yard pass to Jurevicius on third down to advance the ball to the Oakland 37-yard line. Running back Michael Pittman then rushed for a 23-yard gain to the 13-yard line. However, on the next three plays, the Raiders defense limited the Buccaneers to a pair of incompletions and a 1-yard run. Kicker Martin Gramatica then made a 31-yard field goal to tie the game, 3–3.

Later in the period, a 17-yard punt return by Raiders cornerback Darrien Gordon gave Oakland the ball at their own 49-yard line. Gannon then threw an 8-yard pass to running back Charlie Garner to reach the Tampa Bay 43-yard line. But on third down, Buccaneers safety Dexter Jackson intercepted Gannon's pass at the 40-yard line and returned it 9-yards to near midfield. Then nine plays after the turnover, Gramatica kicked his second field goal from 43 yards to give Tampa Bay a 6–3 lead.

Jackson intercepted another pass on the Raiders' next drive and returned it 25 yards to Oakland's 45-yard line, making Jackson the first player ever to record 2 interceptions in the first half of the Super Bowl. However, the Buccaneers were unable to take advantage of the turnover and were forced to punt. Fortunately for Tampa Bay, they got a big assist from their punter Tom Tupa, who managed to pin Oakland all the way back at their own 11-yard line with his punt. The Raiders could not move the ball either, losing 1 yard on 3 plays with their ensuing drive. Tampa Bay punt returner Karl Williams then returned Shane Lechler's punt 25 yards, giving the Buccaneers great field position at Oakland's 27-yard line. Aided with Pittman's gains of 6 and 19 yards, the Buccaneers scored their first touchdown on a 2-yard run from fullback Mike Alstott, increasing their lead 13–3. Then with 3:45 left in the half, Tampa Bay drove 77 yards, assisted by a pair of catches by Alstott for 28 total yards. Johnson finished the drive with a 5-yard touchdown pass to wide receiver Keenan McCardell to give the Buccaneers a 20–3 halftime lead.

Tampa Bay continued to dominate the game for most of the third quarter. The Buccaneers forced the Raiders to punt on the opening drive of the second half. Next, Tampa Bay marched 89 yards on a 14-plays drive that took 7:52 off the clock, and ended with Johnson's 8-yard touchdown pass to McCardell to increase their lead to 27–3. Then on the second play of Oakland's ensuing drive, Buccaneers defensive back Dwight Smith intercepted Gannon's pass and returned it 44 yards for a touchdown, making the score 34–3.

After giving up 34 unanswered points, Oakland finally managed to drive 82 yards down the field and score on a 39-yard touchdown pass from Gannon to receiver Jerry Porter. Although he was initially ruled as being out of bounds when he caught the ball, it was determined that Porter had one foot in the end zone and used it to drag the other foot out. The two-point conversion failed, so the Raiders were still down 34–9.

The Raiders' touchdown seemed to fire up their defense, who forced the Buccaneers to a fourth down on their ensuing possession. Oakland lineman Tim Johnson then blocked Tupa's punt, and Raiders defender Eric Johnson returned the ball 13 yards for a touchdown. Another two-point conversion for Oakland failed, but Tampa Bay's lead was cut to 34–15.

Tampa Bay responded by moving the ball to the Oakland 9-yard line on their ensuing drive, featuring a 24-yard run by Pittman, but they came up empty after Tupa fumbled the snap on a field goal attempt. A few plays later, Gannon threw a 48-yard touchdown pass to wide receiver Jerry Rice with 6:06 left in the game, cutting the Raiders' deficit to 34–21. Rice became the first player to catch a touchdown pass in four different Super Bowls, and third overall to have touchdowns in four Super Bowls (Thurman Thomas and John Elway). The two-point conversion failed when Jerry Porter caught the ball and was forced out of bounds; while the official did not judge it to be a force-out, (judgement call) hence, that part of the play was non reviewable.

In an attempt to prevent a Raiders comeback, the Buccaneers managed to run the clock down to 2:44 on their ensuing drive before being forced to punt. Then on third and 18 from the Oakland 29-yard line, Tampa Bay linebacker Derrick Brooks intercepted a pass from Gannon and returned it 44 yards for a touchdown, giving the Buccaneers a 41–21 lead with only 1:18 left putting the game out of reach. And a few plays later as the Raiders were now playing for pride, Smith intercepted a tipped pass and returned it 50 yards for a touchdown (the 200th touchdown in Super Bowl history). This would be the team's last playoff (and Super Bowl) win until the 2020 season.
