= 2009 NFL season =

American football season

- The 2009 NFL season marked the 50th season of the original eight charter members of the American Football League

Regular season
- Duration: September 10, 2009 – January 3, 2010

Playoffs
- Start date: January 9, 2010
- AFC Champions: Indianapolis Colts
- NFC Champions: New Orleans Saints

Super Bowl XLIV
- Date: February 7, 2010
- Site: Sun Life Stadium, Miami Gardens, Florida
- Champions: New Orleans Saints

Pro Bowl
- Date: January 31, 2010
- Site: Sun Life Stadium, Miami Gardens, Florida

AFC teams: West, North, South, East
NFC teams: West, North, South, East

The 2009 NFL season was the 90th season in the history of the National Football League (NFL). The 50th anniversary of the original eight charter members of the American Football League was celebrated during this season.

The preseason started with the Pro Football Hall of Fame Game on August 9, 2009, and the regular season began September 10, with the reigning Super Bowl XLIII champion Pittsburgh Steelers defeating the Tennessee Titans in overtime. The season ended with Super Bowl XLIV, the league's championship game, on February 7, 2010, at Sun Life Stadium with the New Orleans Saints defeating the Indianapolis Colts 31–17 in Miami Gardens, Florida. The Colts and Saints began the season 14–0 and 13–0 respectively. This was the first time in NFL history two teams started 13–0 or better.

== Player movement ==
=== Free agency ===
Notable players to change teams during free agency included:

- Quarterbacks A.J. Feeley (Philadelphia to Carolina), Brett Favre (N.Y. Jets to Minnesota), Ryan Fitzpatrick (Cincinnati to Buffalo), Rex Grossman (Chicago to Houston) and Byron Leftwich (Pittsburgh to Tampa Bay).
- Running backs Edgerrin James (Arizona to Seattle), Maurice Morris (Seattle to Detroit) and Derrick Ward (N.Y. Giants to Tampa Bay).
- Wide Receivers Laveranues Coles (N.Y. Jets to Cincinnati), Torry Holt (St. Louis to Jacksonville), TJ Houshmandzadeh (Cincinnati to Seattle). Bryant Johnson (San Francisco to Detroit), Terrell Owens (Dallas to Buffalo) and Nate Washington (Pittsburgh to Tennessee).
- Tight Ends Chris Baker (N.Y. Jets to New England) and L.J. Smith (Philadelphia to Baltimore).
- Offensive Tackles Khalif Barnes (Jacksonville to Oakland), Levi Jones (Cincinnati to Washington) and Orlando Pace (St. Louis to Chicago).
- Guards Derrick Dockery (Buffalo to Washington) and Kendall Simmons (Pittsburgh to New England).
- Centers Matt Birk (Minnesota to Baltimore), Jason Brown (Baltimore to St. Louis) and Jake Grove (Oakland to Miami).
- Defensive Ends Chris Canty (Dallas to N.Y. Giants), Greg Ellis (Dallas to Oakland), Demetric Evans (Washington to San Francisco) Igor Olshansky (San Diego to Dallas) and Antonio Smith (Arizona to Houston).
- Defensive Tackles Rocky Bernard (Seattle to N.Y. Giants), Colin Cole (Green Bay to Seattle), Jovan Haye (Tampa Bay to Tennessee), Albert Haynesworth (Tennessee to Washington) and Tank Johnson (Dallas to Cincinnati).
- Linebackers Eric Barton (N.Y. Jets to Cleveland), Michael Boley (Atlanta to N.Y. Giants), Keith Brooking (Atlanta to Dallas), Larry Foote (Pittsburgh to Detroit), Bart Scott (Baltimore to N.Y. Jets) and Pisa Tinoisamoa (St. Louis to Chicago).
- Cornerbacks Leigh Bodden (Detroit to New England), Phillip Buchanon (Tampa Bay to Detroit), Domonique Foxworth (Atlanta to Baltimore), André Goodman (Miami to Denver), Jabari Greer (Buffalo to New Orleans) and Bryant McFadden (Pittsburgh to Arizona).
- Safeties Brian Dawkins (Philadelphia to Denver), Sean Jones (Cleveland to Philadelphia), Jim Leonhard (Baltimore to N.Y. Jets) and Gibril Wilson (Oakland to Miami).

=== Trades ===
The following notable trades were made during the 2009 league year:

- February 27: Houston traded QB Sage Rosenfels to Minnesota in exchange for the Vikings' fourth-round pick in the 2009 NFL draft
- February 27: Cleveland traded TE Kellen Winslow II to Tampa Bay in exchange for the Buccaneers' second-round pick in 2009 and a fifth-round pick in the 2010 NFL draft;
- February 28: New England traded QB Matt Cassell and LB Mike Vrabel to Kansas City in exchange for the Chiefs' second-round pick in 2009;
- February 28: Detroit traded QB Jon Kitna to Dallas in exchange for CB Anthony Henry;
- February 28: Philadelphia traded CB Lito Sheppard to N.Y. Jets in exchange for the Jets' fifth-round pick in 2009 and a conditional pick in 2010;
- March 16: Detroit traded DT Cory Redding to Seattle in exchange for LB Julian Peterson and the Seahawks' fifth-round pick in 2009;
- March 23: Miami traded C Samson Satele to Oakland in exchange for a sixth-round pick in 2009 and a swap of fourth-round picks in 2010;
- April 3: Denver traded QB Jay Cutler and its fifth-round pick in 2009 to Chicago in exchange for QB Kyle Orton and the Bears' first- and third-round picks in 2009 and first-round round pick in 2010;
- April 7: Atlanta traded WR Laurent Robinson to St. Louis in exchange for a swap of fifth- and sixth-round picks;
- April 20: Buffalo traded OT Jason Peters to Philadelphia in exchange for the Eagles' first- and fourth-round picks in 2009 and a conditional pick in 2010;
- April 23: Kansas City traded TE Tony Gonzalez to Atlanta in exchange for a second-round pick;
- April 26: New England traded CB Ellis Hobbs to Philadelphia during the draft in exchange for two fifth-round picks;
- June 26: Detroit traded S Gerald Alexander to Jacksonville in exchange for WR Dennis Northcutt;
- August 6: Oakland traded DE Derrick Burgess to New England in exchange for the Patriots' third- and fourth-round picks in 2010;
- August 31: Houston traded DE Travis Johnson to San Diego in exchange for a sixth-round pick in 2010;
- September 6: New England traded DT Richard Seymour to Oakland in exchange for a first-round pick in 2011;
- October 7: Cleveland traded WR Braylon Edwards to N.Y. Jets in exchange for the Jets' third- and fifth-round picks in 2010 and WR Chansi Stuckey and LB Jason Trusnik;
- October 19: Kansas City traded DT Tank Tyler to Carolina in exchange for a fifth-round pick;
- October 20: St. Louis traded LB Will Witherspoon to Philadelphia in exchange for WR Brandon Gibson and the Eagles' fifth-round pick in 2010.

== Draft ==
The 2009 NFL draft was held from April 25 to 26, 2009, at New York City's Radio City Music Hall. With the first pick, the Detroit Lions selected quarterback Matthew Stafford from the University of Georgia.

== Referee change ==
Bill Carollo resigned to become the Director of Officiating for the Big Ten Conference. Don Carey, brother of NFL referee Mike Carey, was promoted from back judge to take Carollo's place.

== Rule changes ==
Several rule changes were passed at the league's annual owners meeting in Dana Point, California, during the week of March 23.

The following rules were passed to improve player safety and reduce injuries:

- A blindside block cannot be initially delivered by a helmet, forearm or shoulder to an opponent's head or neck.
- The initial contact to the head of a defenseless receiver is also prohibited.
- On kickoffs, a blocking wedge cannot consist of more than two players.
- During onside kickoff attempts, the kicking team cannot have more than five players bunched together.
- Clarified the 2006 rule about hitting passers below the knees; a defender on the ground cannot lunge or dive at or below the passer's knees. This is unofficially referred to as the "Tom Brady Rule", after Brady was injured at the Patriots' 2008 opening game against the Kansas City Chiefs, when Chiefs safety Bernard Pollard hit Brady below the knees, sidelining him for the rest of the 2008 season.

The replay system will now be allowed to cover the following situations:

- Whether a loose ball from a passer is a fumble or an incomplete pass.
- Whether a loose ball actually hit the sideline.

Other new rules included:

- If onside kick does not go 10 yards, goes out of bounds, or is touched illegally at any time during the kick, the ball is immediately awarded to the receiving team. This amends a rule that was first implemented during the 2003 season. Previously, if the kicking team committed this foul before the final five minutes of the game, they had another chance to kick again from five yards back.
- On all fumbles and laterals that go out of bounds, the clock will immediately start when the referee signals ready for play instead of waiting until next snap.
- After a punt hit the center-hung video display boards during a pre-season game, the league temporarily modified the rule regarding balls in play that strike an object such as a video board or a guy wire: in addition for the down being replayed, the game clock will also be reset to the time when the play was snapped.
- In November the United States Congress held hearings regarding NFL players on the field receiving concussions and other major injuries. Strong recommendations were made to the commissioner, and on December 2, 2009, NFL Commissioner Roger Goodell issued a memo effective immediately stating, in part: "Once removed for the duration of a practice or game, the player should not be considered for return-to-football activities until he is fully asymptotic, both at rest and after exertion, has a normal neurological examination, normal neuropsychological testing, and has been cleared to return by both his team physician(s) and the independent neurological consultant." The old standard, established in 2007, said a player shouldn't be allowed to return to the same game if he lost consciousness.

== Preseason ==
The Pro Football Hall of Fame Game was on August 9, 2009, at 8:00 pm EDT on NBC. The Tennessee Titans defeated the Buffalo Bills 21–18, and both wore "throwback" jerseys celebrating the two franchises' AFL origins. It was the first time since 1970 that the teams have not been from opposing conferences; also, both Bills owner Ralph Wilson, a 2009 Hall of Fame inductee, and Titans owner Bud Adams have owned their teams continuously since the AFL's inception in 1960, making them the longest-tenured team owners in the league. Both teams made their first Hall of Fame Game appearance since the 1980s (Buffalo last played in Canton in 1989, Tennessee in 1985 as the former Houston Oilers).

The rest of the pre-season matchups were announced March 30, 2009. Highlights, among others, included a rematch of Super Bowl XLIII between the Pittsburgh Steelers and the Arizona Cardinals on ESPN.

== Regular season ==
The 2009 season began on September 10, 2009. Under the current scheduling system, this is the latest date the NFL can start its season as the season typically starts the weekend after Labor Day, which falls on its latest possible date in 2009.

For the 2009 season, the intraconference and interconference matchups were:

Intraconference

- AFC East vs. AFC South
- AFC North vs. AFC West
- NFC East vs. NFC South
- NFC North vs. NFC West

Interconference

- AFC East vs. NFC South
- AFC North vs. NFC North
- AFC South vs. NFC West
- AFC West vs. NFC East

The 2009 schedule was released on April 14, 2009. Highlights of the 2009 season included:

- NFL Kickoff Game: The 2009 season began with the Kickoff Game on September 10, with the Super Bowl XLIII champion Pittsburgh Steelers defeating the Tennessee Titans 13–10 in overtime.
- The Week 1 doubleheader for Monday Night Football honored the 50th anniversary of the original eight charter members of the American Football League, with the New England Patriots defeating the Buffalo Bills 25–24, and the San Diego Chargers defeating the Oakland Raiders 24–20.
- NFL International Series: The NFL International Series game was played on October 26, 2009, at Wembley Stadium in London, featuring the New England Patriots defeating the Tampa Bay Buccaneers 35–7.
- Thanksgiving: Three games were contested on November 26, 2009. The Green Bay Packers defeated the Detroit Lions 34–12, the Dallas Cowboys defeated the Oakland Raiders 24–7, while in the primetime Thursday Night Football game, the Denver Broncos defeated the New York Giants 26–6..
- Bills Toronto Series: The Buffalo Bills played the New York Jets at Rogers Centre in Toronto on December 3 on Thursday Night Football, with the Jets defeating the cross-state rivals 19–13. Earlier reports on a potential Bills-Toronto Argonauts doubleheader and reports of the league favoring other teams were proven inaccurate.
- Christmas: As Christmas Eve fell on a Thursday, that week's Thursday Night Football game was scheduled as a rare Friday night game on Christmas Day, featuring the San Diego Chargers defeating the Tennessee Titans 42–17.

=== Scheduling changes ===
- China Bowl: The China Bowl, a proposed pre-season game between the New England Patriots and Seattle Seahawks, would have taken place in Beijing, China. It had been postponed from the 2007 season to 2009, but after the 2008 economic crisis, the Patriots closed their Chinese operations and the game was cancelled.
- The NFL moved the September 27 game between the Tennessee Titans and New York Jets at Giants Stadium from 4:15 pm EDT to 1:00 pm EDT, in response to a request from Jets owner Woody Johnson to change the time to accommodate the Jewish Yom Kippur holiday that began at sundown that evening. This marked a rare occasion when the Jets and Giants played at the same time (the Giants played at Tampa Bay). In general, both New York City teams are not scheduled to play at the same time. The Jets game aired on CBS (WCBS-TV in New York), while the Giants game aired on Fox (WNYW-TV).
- The Jets and Giants played again at the same time on November 1. The Jets hosted the Miami Dolphins at Giants Stadium, while the Giants played at Philadelphia. The Giants–Eagles game was originally scheduled for 4:15 pm EST, but moved forward to 1:00 pm EST in order to avoid ending too close to the start of the Phillies hosting Game 4 of the 2009 World Series that evening at Citizens Bank Park, which is directly across Pattison Avenue from Lincoln Financial Field. The Minnesota–Green Bay game, originally scheduled for 1:00 pm EST that same day, was moved to 4:15 pm EST. It marked Brett Favre's return to Green Bay, this time as the Vikings quarterback.
- The Chicago–Minnesota and Arizona–Tennessee games on November 29 were rescheduled from 1:00 pm EST to 4:15 pm EST.
- By way of Flex Scheduling, the Minnesota–Arizona game on December 6 was moved to the 8:20 pm EST slot to replace the New England–Miami matchup.
- The St. Louis–Tennessee game on December 13 was rescheduled from 1:00 pm EST to 4:05 pm EST.
- The Green Bay–Pittsburgh game on December 20 was rescheduled from 1:00 pm EST to 4:15 pm EST. That same day, a major east coast blizzard forced the Chicago–Baltimore and San Francisco–Philadelphia games to be pushed back from 1:00 pm EST to 4:15 pm EST on only two days notice, to allow more time for cleaning up the stadiums after the blizzard.
- The Denver–Philadelphia game on December 27 was moved from 1:00 pm EST to 4:15 pm EST.
- For week 17, the Philadelphia–Dallas game to decide the NFC East champion was switched to 4:15 pm EST, while the Cincinnati–New York Jets game was selected as the final Sunday Night Football game.

=== Week 17: End of team randomization ===
2009 marked the last time that Week 17 games could be randomized. Beginning in 2010, the Week 17 schedule was restricted to divisional match-ups only, in an attempt to increase competition after several cases over the last few seasons of playoff-bound teams resting their regular starters and playing their reserves. This has continued since then.

== Regular season standings ==
=== Division ===
AFC East
	W	L	T	PCT	DIV	CONF	PF	PA	STK
^{(3)} New England Patriots	10	6	0	.625	4–2	7–5	427	285	L1
^{(5)} New York Jets	9	7	0	.563	2–4	7–5	348	236	W2
Miami Dolphins	7	9	0	.438	4–2	5–7	360	390	L3
Buffalo Bills	6	10	0	.375	2–4	4–8	258	326	W1

AFC North
	W	L	T	PCT	DIV	CONF	PF	PA	STK
^{(4)} Cincinnati Bengals	10	6	0	.625	6–0	7–5	305	291	L1
^{(6)} Baltimore Ravens	9	7	0	.563	3–3	7–5	391	261	W1
Pittsburgh Steelers	9	7	0	.563	2–4	6–6	368	324	W3
Cleveland Browns	5	11	0	.313	1–5	5–7	245	375	W4

AFC South
	W	L	T	PCT	DIV	CONF	PF	PA	STK
^{(1)} Indianapolis Colts	14	2	0	.875	6–0	10–2	416	307	L2
Houston Texans	9	7	0	.563	1–5	6–6	388	333	W4
Tennessee Titans	8	8	0	.500	2–4	4–8	354	402	W1
Jacksonville Jaguars	7	9	0	.438	3–3	6–6	290	380	L4

AFC West
	W	L	T	PCT	DIV	CONF	PF	PA	STK
^{(2)} San Diego Chargers	13	3	0	.813	5–1	9–3	454	320	W11
Denver Broncos	8	8	0	.500	3–3	6–6	326	324	L4
Oakland Raiders	5	11	0	.313	2–4	4–8	197	379	L2
Kansas City Chiefs	4	12	0	.250	2–4	3–9	294	424	W1

NFC East
	W	L	T	PCT	DIV	CONF	PF	PA	STK
^{(3)} Dallas Cowboys	11	5	0	.688	4–2	9–3	361	250	W3
^{(6)} Philadelphia Eagles	11	5	0	.688	4–2	9–3	429	337	L1
New York Giants	8	8	0	.500	4–2	6–6	402	427	L2
Washington Redskins	4	12	0	.250	0–6	2–10	266	336	L3

NFC North
	W	L	T	PCT	DIV	CONF	PF	PA	STK
^{(2)} Minnesota Vikings	12	4	0	.750	5–1	9–3	470	312	W1
^{(5)} Green Bay Packers	11	5	0	.688	4–2	9–3	461	297	W2
Chicago Bears	7	9	0	.438	3–3	5–7	327	375	W2
Detroit Lions	2	14	0	.125	0–6	1–11	262	494	L6

NFC South
	W	L	T	PCT	DIV	CONF	PF	PA	STK
^{(1)} New Orleans Saints	13	3	0	.813	4–2	9–3	510	341	L3
Atlanta Falcons	9	7	0	.563	3–3	6–6	363	325	W3
Carolina Panthers	8	8	0	.500	4–2	8–4	315	308	W3
Tampa Bay Buccaneers	3	13	0	.188	1–5	3–9	244	400	L1

NFC West
	W	L	T	PCT	DIV	CONF	PF	PA	STK
^{(4)} Arizona Cardinals	10	6	0	.625	4–2	8–4	375	325	L1
San Francisco 49ers	8	8	0	.500	5–1	7–5	330	281	W2
Seattle Seahawks	5	11	0	.313	3–3	4–8	280	390	L4
St. Louis Rams	1	15	0	.063	0–6	1–11	175	436	L8

=== Conference ===
AFC
#	Team	Division	W	L	T	PCT	DIV	CONF	SOS	SOV	STK
Division leaders
1	Indianapolis Colts	South	14	2	0	.875	6–0	10–2	.473	.470	L2
2	San Diego Chargers	West	13	3	0	.813	5–1	9–3	.453	.433	W11
3 (Note: New England clinched the AFC No. 3 seed based on strength of victory.)	New England Patriots	East	10	6	0	.625	4–2	7–5	.516	.450	L1
4	Cincinnati Bengals	North	10	6	0	.625	6–0	7–5	.492	.438	L1
Wild Cards
5 (Note: NY Jets clinched the AFC No. 5 seed based on better record in common games after Houston was eliminated from the three-way tiebreaker based on better conference record.)	New York Jets	East	9	7	0	.563	2–4	7–5	.516	.507	W2
6 (Note: Baltimore finished in second place in the AFC North based on division record.) (Note: Baltimore clinched the AFC No. 6 seed based on conference record. Division tiebreaker was initially used to eliminate Pittsburgh (see below).)	Baltimore Ravens	North	9	7	0	.563	3–3	7–5	.523	.403	W1
Did not qualify for the postseason
7	Houston Texans	South	9	7	0	.563	1–5	6–6	.504	.417	W4
8 (Note: Pittsburgh did not qualify as a Wild Card based on the first tiebreaking step for three or more clubs which reads, "Apply division tie breaker to eliminate all but the highest ranked club in each division prior to proceeding to Step 2".)	Pittsburgh Steelers	North	9	7	0	.563	2–4	6–6	.488	.521	W3
9 (Note: Denver finished ahead of Tennessee based on a better conference record.)	Denver Broncos	West	8	8	0	.500	3–3	6–6	.527	.516	L4
10	Tennessee Titans	South	8	8	0	.500	2–4	4–8	.539	.414	W1
11 (Note: Miami finished ahead of Jacksonville based on a head-to-head victory.)	Miami Dolphins	East	7	9	0	.438	4–2	5–7	.559	.464	L3
12	Jacksonville Jaguars	South	7	9	0	.438	3–3	6–6	.496	.411	L4
13	Buffalo Bills	East	6	10	0	.375	2–4	4–8	.516	.469	W1
14 (Note: Cleveland finished ahead of Oakland based on a head-to-head victory.)	Cleveland Browns	North	5	11	0	.313	1–5	5–7	.512	.388	W4
15	Oakland Raiders	West	5	11	0	.313	2–4	4–8	.527	.525	L2
16	Kansas City Chiefs	West	4	12	0	.250	2–4	3–9	.516	.406	W1
Tiebreakers (Note: When breaking ties for three or more teams under the NFL's rules, they are first broken within divisions, then comparing only the highest ranked remaining team from each division.)

NFC
#	Team	Division	W	L	T	PCT	DIV	CONF	SOS	SOV	STK
Division leaders
1	New Orleans Saints	South	13	3	0	.813	4–2	9–3	.426	.418	L3
2	Minnesota Vikings	North	12	4	0	.750	5–1	9–3	.441	.411	W1
3 (Note: Dallas won the NFC East based on the head-to-head sweep over Philadelphia.)	Dallas Cowboys	East	11	5	0	.688	4–2	9–3	.488	.438	W3
4	Arizona Cardinals	West	10	6	0	.625	4–2	8–4	.445	.356	L1
Wild Cards
5 (Note: Green Bay clinched the NFC No. 5 seed over Philadelphia based on winning percentage vs. common opponents (4–1 versus 3–2 against Dallas, San Francisco, Chicago and Tampa Bay).)	Green Bay Packers	North	11	5	0	.688	4–2	9–3	.441	.381	W2
6	Philadelphia Eagles	East	11	5	0	.688	4–2	9–3	.484	.403	L1
Did not qualify for the postseason
7	Atlanta Falcons	South	9	7	0	.563	3–3	6–6	.504	.382	W3
8 (Note: Carolina, San Francisco and NY Giants are ranked based on conference record.)	Carolina Panthers	South	8	8	0	.500	4–2	8–4	.539	.484	W3
9	San Francisco 49ers	West	8	8	0	.500	5–1	7–5	.477	.336	W2
10	New York Giants	East	8	8	0	.500	4–2	6–6	.535	.398	L2
11	Chicago Bears	North	7	9	0	.438	3–3	5–7	.496	.321	W2
12	Seattle Seahawks	West	5	11	0	.313	3–3	4–8	.477	.238	L4
13	Washington Redskins	East	4	12	0	.250	0–6	2–10	.492	.266	L3
14	Tampa Bay Buccaneers	South	3	13	0	.188	1–5	3–9	.555	.604	L1
15	Detroit Lions	North	2	14	0	.125	0–6	1–11	.520	.281	L6
16	St. Louis Rams	West	1	15	0	.063	0–6	1–11	.520	.125	L8
Tiebreakers (Note: When breaking ties for three or more teams under the NFL's rules, they are first broken within divisions, then comparing only the highest-ranked remaining team from each division.)

== Postseason ==
The playoffs began Saturday, January 9, 2010, with Wild Card Weekend. Divisional playoffs followed the next week. The defending world champions Pittsburgh Steelers did not take part in the post-season as they were eliminated from contention in the final week 17, thus this was the fifth year in a row the NFL crowned a new Super Bowl champion.

The AFC Championship Game was Sunday, January 24, 2010, at 3:00 pm, which saw the Indianapolis Colts come from behind to defeat the New York Jets, 30–17. It was followed by the NFC Championship Game at 6:30 pm which featured many back to back scoring drives by two high scoring Vikings and Saints offenses. But the Minnesota Vikings 4 fumbles and a Brett Favre interception late in the fourth quarter proved to be too much to handle as the New Orleans Saints won 31–28 in overtime which granted the franchise's first Super Bowl appearance in its 43-year history. Super Bowl XLIV was held February 7 at Miami Gardens, Florida's Sun Life Stadium (home of host team Miami Dolphins, who were also eliminated from post-season contention).

The 2010 Pro Bowl was held on January 31, one week before Super Bowl XLIV, at the same site of the league championship game, Sun Life Stadium in Miami Gardens, Florida. This was the first time since 1979 (held for the 1978 season) that the Pro Bowl was held in the Continental United States as opposed to Hawaii. The NFL also announced that the site and date of Pro Bowl games after 2010 will include playing the game on a rotating basis in Honolulu. NFL Commissioner Roger Goodell said the move was made after looking at alternatives to strengthen the Pro Bowl and to make the end of the season more climactic. As a result of the move, players will not be allowed to play in both the Super Bowl and the Pro Bowl in the same year. In addition, ESPN replaced CBS as broadcaster for that game only.

Within each conference, the four division winners and the top two non-division winners with the best overall regular season records) qualified for the playoffs. The four division winners are seeded 1–4 based on their overall won-lost-tied record, and the wild card teams are seeded 5–6. The NFL does not use a fixed bracket playoff system, and there are no restrictions regarding teams from the same division matching up in any round. In the first round, dubbed the wild-card playoffs or wild-card weekend, the third-seeded division winner hosts the sixth-seed wild card, and the fourth seed hosts the fifth. The 1 and 2 seeds from each conference received a first-round bye. In the second round, the divisional playoffs, the number 1 seed hosts the worst-surviving seed from the first round (seed 4, 5, or 6), while the number 2 seed will play the other team (seed 3, 4, or 5). The two surviving teams from each conference's divisional playoff games met in the respective AFC and NFC Conference Championship games, hosted by the higher seed. Although the Super Bowl, the championship round of the playoffs, is played at a neutral site, the designated home team is based on an annual rotation by conference.

Playoff seeds
Seed	AFC	NFC
1	Indianapolis Colts (South winner)	New Orleans Saints (South winner)
2	San Diego Chargers (West winner)	Minnesota Vikings (North winner)
3	New England Patriots (East winner)	Dallas Cowboys (East winner)
4	Cincinnati Bengals (North winner)	Arizona Cardinals (West winner)
5	New York Jets (wild card)	Green Bay Packers (wild card)
6	Baltimore Ravens (wild card)	Philadelphia Eagles (wild card)

=== Playoffs bracket ===
Jan 9 – Cowboys Stadium	Jan 17 – Hubert H. Humphrey Metrodome
6	Philadelphia	14
3	Dallas	3
3	Dallas	34	Jan 24 – Louisiana Superdome
2	Minnesota	34
NFC
Jan 10 – University of Phoenix Stadium	2	Minnesota	28
Jan 16 – Louisiana Superdome
1	New Orleans	31*
5	Green Bay	45	NFC Championship
4	Arizona	14
4	Arizona	51*	Feb 7 – Sun Life Stadium
1	New Orleans	45
Wild-card round
Divisional round
Jan 9 – Paul Brown Stadium	N1	New Orleans	31
Jan 17 – Qualcomm Stadium
A1	Indianapolis	17
5	NY Jets	24	Super Bowl XLIV
5	NY Jets	17
4	Cincinnati	14	Jan 24 – Lucas Oil Stadium
2	San Diego	14
AFC
Jan 10 – Gillette Stadium	5	NY Jets	17
Jan 16 – Lucas Oil Stadium
1	Indianapolis	30
6	Baltimore	33	AFC Championship
6	Baltimore	3
3	New England	14
1	Indianapolis	20

* Indicates overtime victory

== Fiftieth anniversary of the American Football League ==
The 2009 season marked the fiftieth season of nine of the league's 32 teams: the Dallas Cowboys, and the Original Eight charter members of the American Football League, whose owners became collectively known as "The Foolish Club". The fifth league to use the AFL moniker (previous leagues in 1926, 1934, 1936–37, and 1940–41, all had failed) began play in 1960 and would form the major portion of the American Football Conference (AFC) when the NFL completed its merger with the AFL in 1970:

- Boston Patriots, now the New England Patriots
- Buffalo Bills
- Dallas Texans, now the Kansas City Chiefs
- Denver Broncos
- Houston Oilers, now the Tennessee Titans
- Los Angeles Chargers for a year, then became the San Diego Chargers, but now are the Los Angeles Chargers again
- Titans of New York, now the New York Jets
- Oakland Raiders (Originally a Minnesota team, then the botched-Spanglish Oakland Senors, before settling on Raiders prior to first game)

The Bills and Jets used AFL-era throwback uniforms as their alternate jerseys prior to 2009, and continued them beyond that. The league had the other six teams use a third jersey replicating those from the AFL in their heyday. Each of the Original Eight played against another original AFL team, one at home and one away, on two "AFL Legacy Weekends", and had a special 50th Anniversary AFL patch on the throwback uniforms. In a waiver given by these eight, they would wear the anniversary throwbacks a maximum of four times a season, whereas all of the other teams have a limit of twice per season. The Patriots and Raiders wore the throwbacks the maximum four times, while the Bills, Chiefs (Texans), Chargers, Jets (Titans), and Titans (Oilers) were worn three times. The Chargers also wore their regular powder blue alternate jersey of the current design for two other allowed games. In the second game of two meetings opposite of the first game for their divisional matches against the Raiders and Chiefs, the Chargers wore their newer look powder blue jerseys against the Raiders in week 8, and also celebrated their 50th Anniversary in the modern powder blue jerseys against the Chiefs later in the season during Week 12, when the meeting against those two clubs shifted to San Diego. The Broncos elected to wear their throwbacks only twice (the team wore the infamous 1960–1961 brown and yellow throwbacks with the vertically-striped socks) and wore their regular orange alternate jersey of the current design in the other two allowed games, giving the team six different uniforms over a 16-game season. Both of the games involving the orange jerseys involved the Dallas Cowboys and the Pittsburgh Steelers—two "old" NFL teams before the merger, with the Steelers joining the Broncos in the AFC in 1970 as a result of the merger.

An AFL patch is already a permanent part of the Kansas City Chiefs' jerseys, in honor of team and AFL founder Lamar Hunt, who died in December 2006. The program kicked off on August 9 in the 2009 Pro Football Hall of Fame Game with the Bills playing the Titans (Oilers). Besides the Legacy Games, the Chiefs wore Dallas Texans uniforms in one home game against the NFC's Dallas Cowboys, who also wore throwbacks, while the Cowboys hosted the Raiders in a Thanksgiving Day game in Arlington, Texas. (The Chiefs and Cowboys throwbacks both feature team-colored jerseys, making it the first dark color vs. dark color game since the Bears-Cowboys 2004 Thanksgiving game.) For all games other than those cited above, the Original Eight wore their 2009 uniforms, each with a team-specific 50th Anniversary shoulder patch, save for the Titans, who wore the AFL 50th Anniversary logo on all uniforms. For the legacy weekends, on-field officials working the Original Eight's games also had their own throwbacks – shirts with Chinese-red stripes, and an AFL chest and cap logo. The fields for the regular season games were painted in the innovative designs introduced by the AFL in the 1960s (for instance, the Broncos' end zones are painted in an argyle pattern).

Although the Dolphins and Bengals were both part of the AFL, they did not join the league until 1966 and 1968, respectively. The Dolphins played in three of the Legacy games (wearing their current uniforms), while the Bengals were not part of the events.

After the season, the Patriots adopted their AFL-era throwbacks as their new third uniform for 2010, while the Broncos continue to paint their end zones at Invesco Field at Mile High in the argyle pattern, similar to the Steelers decision to paint the south end zone at Heinz Field in plain diagonal white lines after their 2003 preseason game against the Philadelphia Eagles honoring the 60th anniversary of the Steagles season.

Original Eight AFL League Uniforms
Team	Year	Uniform feature
Buffalo Bills	1965	AFL Championship season (Dark jerseys current third uniform).
Denver Broncos	1960	Featured infamous brown and yellow (or brown and white) vertically striped socks
Kansas City Chiefs (Dallas Texans)	1962	AFL Championship season; same as current but with State of Texas outline.
New England Patriots (Boston Patriots)	1963	First divisional championship.
New York Jets (The Titans of New York)	1961	Dark jerseys are current third uniform.
Oakland Raiders	1963	White jerseys with silver numbers trimmed in black.
San Diego Chargers	1963	AFL Championship Season.
Tennessee Titans (Houston Oilers)	1960	First season of existence.

AFL Legacy Game Schedule
Date	Site	Teams
August 9	Canton, Ohio	Bills vs. Houston Oilers (Tennessee Titans)
September 14	Foxborough, Massachusetts	Bills at Boston Patriots (New England Patriots)
September 14	Oakland	Chargers at Raiders
September 27	East Rutherford, New Jersey	Houston Oilers at The Titans of New York (Tennessee Titans at NY Jets)
October 11	Kansas City	Dallas Cowboys at Dallas Texans (Kansas City Chiefs)
October 11	Denver	Boston Patriots (New England Patriots) at Broncos
October 18	Foxborough, Massachusetts	Houston Oilers at Boston Patriots (Tennessee Titans at New England Patriots)
October 19	San Diego	Broncos at Chargers
October 25	Kansas City	Chargers at Dallas Texans (Kansas City Chiefs)
October 25	Oakland	The Titans of New York (NY Jets) at Raiders
November 1	East Rutherford	Dolphins at The Titans of New York (NY Jets)
November 15	Nashville	Bills at Houston Oilers (Tennessee Titans)
November 15	Oakland	Dallas Texans (Kansas City Chiefs) at Raiders
November 26	Arlington, Texas	Raiders at Dallas Cowboys
November 29	Orchard Park, New York	Dolphins at Bills
December 6	Miami Gardens, Florida	Boston Patriots (New England Patriots) at Dolphins

== Other anniversaries ==
It was the fortieth season since the AFL–NFL merger was officially completed in 1970, and also the sixtieth season since the All-America Football Conference merged with the NFL, adding the Cleveland Browns and San Francisco 49ers to the league. No celebrations were held for any of those teams, but San Francisco reverted to their old colors (lighter shades of red and gold from their glory seasons of five Super Bowl victories) in an unrelated move.

=== Dallas Cowboys ===
The NFC's Dallas Cowboys also celebrated their fiftieth season in 2009. After the NFL had rebuffed Lamar Hunt's overtures to place an NFL team in Dallas, saying they had no plans to expand, the league granted the Cowboys a franchise in 1960 in reaction to Hunt's AFL Dallas Texans. The NFL's Cowboys franchise started out in 1960 with a record of no wins, eleven losses and one tie, but has since gone on to appear in eight Super Bowls (the only other teams to appear in eight was the Pittsburgh Steelers on February 6, 2011, the New England Patriots on February 1, 2015), and the Denver Broncos on February 7, 2016, winning five of them, tied for second with the San Francisco 49ers and the New England Patriots, behind only the Pittsburgh Steelers. Ironically, the Texans' franchise, which left Dallas to become the Kansas City Chiefs, won Super Bowl IV, two years before the Cowboys won their first. Though there was never an actual game between the Dallas Texans and the Cowboys, the 2009 "throwback" game played against Kansas City (Dallas Texans) and the Dallas Cowboys was played as "The Game that Never Was". The [Dallas] Cowboys won the game at Arrowhead Stadium in Kansas City, Missouri, 26–20 in overtime. Interestingly, the visiting Cowboys wore home throwback jerseys, so both teams wore home uniforms.

=== NFC North ===
All four members of the NFC North celebrated significant anniversaries.

The Green Bay Packers and Chicago Bears, two of the oldest teams of the NFL remaining in the league, marked their 90th seasons in 2009. While the Packers did not join the NFL until 1921, the team marks its founding with the team's creation in 1919. The first Sunday Night Football game of the season featured the two teams, pitted in "The League's Oldest Rivalry".

Likewise, the Minnesota Vikings celebrated their being in existence for 50 years. The team traces its existence to the founding of the AFL in 1959, but although they participated in that league's inaugural draft, they were instead lured to the NFL before playing a game. (The Oakland Raiders replaced Minnesota in the AFL.) The Minnesota team, not named the Vikings until after they joined the NFL and did not take any of their drafted players with them, were granted their own expansion draft by the NFL and did not play until 1961. As such, the Vikings were only in their 49th season, and will celebrate their 50th NFL season in 2010, while the Detroit Lions will be in its 80th season in the NFL, and their 76th in Detroit. Last season, Detroit reintroduced its throwback jersey, while Minnesota continues using theirs. None of the teams held significant celebrations in 2009.

== Notable events ==
=== Return of Brett Favre ===
After one season with the New York Jets, Brett Favre retired again from football on February 11, 2009, and was released on April 28, 2009, making him a free agent. On May 4, 2009, rumors began nationwide on the Internet, radio and TV outlets about him coming out of retirement again and possibly joining the Minnesota Vikings, his division arch-rival when he was with the Green Bay Packers, also meeting with Vikings head coach Brad Childress that week. On May 11, in an indication of Favre's possible return, it was reported he was scheduled to have a procedure on his torn biceps tendon on his throwing arm he injured when he was with the Jets and it was either a surgical or non-surgical process but wasn't confirmed throughout May. On June 15, 2009, he revealed he had surgery on his right torn biceps tendon and considered on playing again. On July 15, 2009, he informed the Vikings that he would make his decision of coming out of retirement or not by July 30, 2009, the day Vikings training camp started. On July 28, 2009, two days early before training camp, he informed the Vikings that he would remain retired. On August 18, 2009, it was reported that Favre got on a private jet and was heading to Minnesota to join the Vikings. It was later confirmed and he officially signed with the Minnesota Vikings. He was signed to a two-year, $25 million deal with an option for 2010 for $13 million. On December 6, 2009, Favre played in his 283rd consecutive game, breaking Jim Marshall's long-standing record. The Vikings finished their season with a record of 12–4 and made the playoffs as the number two seed. Favre was voted to the 2010 Pro Bowl, but did not participate and was replaced by Tony Romo.

=== Return of Michael Vick ===
Free agent quarterback Michael Vick was reinstated on July 27, 2009, after finishing his 2-year prison term and on August 13, 2009, he signed a one-year, $1.6 million contract with the Philadelphia Eagles also with an option in 2010 for $5 million. Vick finished the season with one passing touchdown and two rushing touchdowns. He helped the Eagles to an 11–5 record and the NFC's number six seed.

=== Jay Cutler trade ===
After disagreements between Jay Cutler and the Denver Broncos management, on March 15, 2009, Cutler requested a trade from the team. On April 2, 2009, Cutler was traded to the Chicago Bears from the Broncos along with a fifth-round pick in the 2009 NFL draft. In return, the Broncos acquired quarterback Kyle Orton along with the Bears' first and third-round selections in 2009 also the first round pick in 2010. Later in the season on October 20, 2009, the Bears signed Cutler to a two-year, $30 million contract extension up to 2013.

=== Two teams undefeated late into the season ===
The Indianapolis Colts started the season 14–0, and the New Orleans Saints started the season 13–0, the first time that two teams went that deep into the season without suffering a loss. Unlike the Saints who had not yet clinched home field throughout the playoffs and who legitimately lost their fourteenth game in Week 15, the Colts intentionally lost their fifteenth game in Week 16, giving an opportunity to the Jets to get into the playoffs. After setting the record for consecutive regular season wins over multiple seasons, running their mark to 23, the Colts were up at halftime at home, and then Coach Caldwell benched all his starters for the second half, allowing the Jets to win, and ruining the Colts' try at a perfect season. Indianapolis fans were incensed and heartily booed Caldwell.

=== Incidents with Tom Cable ===
On August 17, 2009 Oakland Raiders head coach Tom Cable was accused of punching assistant coach Randy Hanson in the face and fracturing his jaw. The incident allegedly took place on August 5 during the Raiders training camp, held in Napa. On October 22, 2009, the Napa district attorney announced that no charges would be filed against Cable. The Raiders finished their season with a record of 5–11.

=== First Super Bowl appearance for Saints ===
On January 24, 2010, the New Orleans Saints defeated the Minnesota Vikings in the NFC Championship Game in overtime by a score of 31–28. The win secured their berth in Super Bowl XLIV, the franchise's first ever Super Bowl.

Later on February 7, the Saints defeated the Indianapolis Colts in the Super Bowl by a score of 31–17. Quarterback Drew Brees was named the MVP.

== Deaths ==
=== Hall of Fame members ===
Lou Creekmur
Creekmur played ten seasons in the NFL as an offensive tackle and guard with the Detroit Lions and was inducted into the Hall of Fame in 1996. He was an eight-time Pro Bowler and seven-time First Team All-Pro. He died on July 5, age 82.
George McAfee
McAfee played eight seasons in the NFL as a back with the Chicago Bears and was inducted into the Hall of Fame in 1966. He was a Pro Bowler and an All-Pro selection in 1941. He died on March 4, age 90.

=== Active personnel ===
- Chris Henry, Cincinnati Bengals wide receiver. Died on December 17, 2009, at the age of 26 after suffering from injuries after falling from the back of his pick-up truck in Charlotte, North Carolina, the previous day.

== Records and milestones ==
=== Winning and losing streaks ===
- The Atlanta Falcons accomplished their first back to back winning seasons in franchise history. They still hold the record among all major American sports leagues for the longest streak of seasons without consecutive winning seasons. The streak lasted for 43 years from 1966.
- The New Orleans Saints won their first 13 games in the NFC of the regular season, breaking the record of 12 straight by the 1985 Chicago Bears who also won the Super Bowl.
- The Indianapolis Colts won their 23rd consecutive regular season game with a 35–31 victory over the Jacksonville Jaguars on December 16, 2009. The previous week, the Colts had broken the previous record (21-games) held by the 2003–2004 New England Patriots. They lost the following week to the New York Jets after resting many of their starters with a 15–10 lead in the third quarter of that game.
- The Denver Broncos became the third team since 1970 to miss the NFL playoffs after a 6–0 start. The other two teams to miss the playoffs since the AFL/NFL merger were the 1978 Washington Redskins and the 2003 Minnesota Vikings.
- The Tennessee Titans started the season losing their first six games, then, led by second-string quarterback Vince Young, won their next five games, the first NFL team to have such a turnaround.
- The Pittsburgh Steelers became the first team since the 1987 New York Giants to lose five consecutive games in the season after winning the Super Bowl.
- Two teams tied an NFL record for most kickoff returns for touchdowns in a single game, with two: the Miami Dolphins (November 1, vs. the New York Jets) and the Cleveland Browns (December 20, vs. the Kansas City Chiefs).

=== Rams achieve worst peacetime three-season streak until mid-2010s Browns ===
The St. Louis Rams finish as the NFL's tenth 1–15 or 0–16 team, giving them a record from 2007 to 2009 of six wins and forty-two losses. Since a regular schedule began in 1936, only two teams have achieved a comparably bad record over three seasons:

1. the wartime Cardinals going 1–29 between 1943 and 1945 if one includes Card-Pitt, and 4–27 if one only includes Cardinals seasons.
2. the 2015 to 2017 Cleveland Browns, who went 4–44 over three seasons

=== First team to go to the Super Bowl with a losing streak ===
The New Orleans Saints became the first team in NFL history to lose their last three regular season games and then go on to the Super Bowl and win.

=== Two top seeds face each other in Super Bowl ===
For the first time since the 1993 season, the AFC's and NFC's top seeds, the Indianapolis Colts and the New Orleans Saints respectively, played one another in the Super Bowl, where the Saints defeated the Colts, 31–17.

=== Tom Brady's record-setting quarter ===
In a Week 6 game against the Tennessee Titans, the New England Patriots' Tom Brady threw five touchdown passes in the second quarter, an NFL record. The Patriots led the Titans 45–0 at halftime, also a league record, before winning the game 59–0, tied for the league's largest shutout margin since the 1970 AFL–NFL merger.

=== Panthers produce two 1,100+ yard rushers ===
DeAngelo Williams and Jonathan Stewart of the Carolina Panthers became the first teammates in NFL history to rush for 1,100 yards in the same season. Williams rushed for 1,117 yards, and Stewart ran for 1,133 yards.

=== Kurt Warner sets single-game regular-season completion percentage record ===
In Week 2, the Arizona Cardinals' Kurt Warner set a new NFL record for completion percentage, completing 92.3% of his passes (24 completions in 26 attempts) in a 31–17 win over the Jacksonville Jaguars. The previous record had been set by Vinny Testaverde in 1993. If postseason games are included, the record holder is Tom Brady of the New England Patriots, who completed 26 of 28 attempts on January 12, 2008, also against the Jaguars.

=== Brandon Marshall breaks single-game reception record ===
In Week 13, the Denver Broncos' Brandon Marshall caught a record 21 catches in a losing effort against the Indianapolis Colts. (The record was previously held by the San Francisco 49ers' Terrell Owens, who had 20 catches in a 2001 game.)

=== Aaron Rodgers strong start ===
Aaron Rodgers of the Green Bay Packers became the first quarterback to throw for 4,000 yards in each of his first two seasons as a starter. (Rodgers, Cam Newton of the Carolina Panthers, Andrew Luck of the Indianapolis Colts, and Kurt Warner of the St. Louis Rams are the only quarterbacks to throw for 4,000 in their first season as a starter. Warner, however, passed for only 3,429 in 2000. Rodgers passed for 4,038 in 2008 and 4,434 in 2009.)

=== 2,000-yard season for Chris Johnson ===
On January 3, 2010, Chris Johnson of the Tennessee Titans became the sixth rusher in NFL history to eclipse 2,000 rushing yards in a season. Johnson also broke the all-purpose yards from scrimmage record previously held by Marshall Faulk.

=== Joshua Cribbs breaks NFL's career returns record ===
In a Week 15 game against the Kansas City Chiefs on December 20, 2009, the Cleveland Browns' Joshua Cribbs returned two kickoffs for touchdowns, giving him eight for his career, and setting a new league record. Cribbs also became one of only two players to score two 100-plus yard touchdowns in the same game. (The feat was first accomplished by Ted Ginn Jr. of the Miami Dolphins in Week 8 of the 2009 season.)

=== Cowboys set single-game attendance record ===
For the opening game of their new stadium, the Dallas Cowboys distributed 105,121 tickets, setting an NFL record for attendance in a single game. The old mark of 103,467 occurred in October 2005 at a 49ers-Cardinals game at Azteca Stadium in Mexico.

=== Drew Brees sets season completion percentage record ===
Drew Brees of the New Orleans Saints set an NFL record for completion percentage in a season. Brees was 363 of 514, a completion percentage of 70.6. (The record of 70.55% had previously been set in the strike-shortened 1982 season by Ken Anderson of the Cincinnati Bengals. Brees sat out the last game of the 2009 season since New Orleans had secured home-field advantage throughout the NFC Playoffs.)

=== Highest scoring playoff game in NFL history ===
On January 10, 2010, the Arizona Cardinals defeated the Green Bay Packers 51–45 for a combined total of 96 points, setting a new NFL playoff record for total combined points scored. This game has been given the nicknames "The Shootout", and the "Nobody Stopping Nobody Game".

=== Conference championships become most viewed playoff games in history ===
On January 24, 2010, the NFC and AFC championship games averaged 52.9 million viewers, making it the most-viewed conference championship day since the two games in 1982 averaged 60.2 million viewers. Fox's telecast of the Saints' 31–28 overtime win over the Vikings earned a 30.6 fast-national Nielsen rating (57.9 million viewers), marking Fox's biggest audience ever for an NFC championship game. It was also the second largest all-time audience for any conference title telecast, trailing only the 1982 49ers-Cowboys game (68.7 million viewers on CBS).

Excluding Super Bowl telecasts, the Saints-Vikings game was the most-viewed television program since the "Seinfeld" finale in 1998. Meanwhile, CBS earned a 26.3 fast-national rating (46.9 million viewers) for the Colts–Jets AFC championship game in the early window, marking the largest audience for an AFC title game since NBC earned 47.5 million viewers for Patriots–Dolphins in 1986.

=== Super Bowl becomes most viewed program in history ===
Super Bowl XLIV surpassed the 1983 finale of M*A*S*H, as the most viewed program in history. It was watched by 153.4 million people. Compelling story lines included the city of New Orleans and its ongoing recovery from Hurricane Katrina, as well as Colts quarterback Peyton Manning's attempt at a second Super Bowl ring.

== Regular season statistical leaders ==
Team
Points scored	New Orleans Saints (510)
Total yards gained	New Orleans Saints (6461)
Yards rushing	New York Jets (2756)
Yards passing	Houston Texans (4654)
Fewest points allowed	New York Jets (236)
Fewest total yards allowed	New York Jets (4037)
Fewest rushing yards allowed	Green Bay Packers (1333)
Fewest passing yards allowed	New York Jets (2459)
Individual
Scoring leader	Nate Kaeding, San Diego (146)
Touchdowns	Adrian Peterson, Minnesota (18 TDs)
Most field goals made	David Akers, Philadelphia and Nate Kaeding, San Diego (32 FGs)
Rushing	Chris Johnson, Tennessee (2,006 yards)
Passer rating	Drew Brees, New Orleans (109.6 rating)
Passing touchdowns	Drew Brees, New Orleans (34 TDs)
Passing yards	Matt Schaub, Houston (4,770 yards)
Pass receptions	Wes Welker, New England (123 catches)
Pass receiving yards	Andre Johnson, Houston (1,569 yards)
Tackles	Patrick Willis, San Francisco (114 tackles)
Interceptions	Jairus Byrd, Buffalo, Asante Samuel, Philadelphia, Darren Sharper, New Orleans and Charles Woodson, Green Bay (9)
Punting	Shane Lechler, Oakland (4,909 yards, 51.1 average yards)
Sacks	Elvis Dumervil, Denver (17)

== Awards ==
=== Postseason awards ===
Award	Player	Position	Team
Most Valuable Player	Peyton Manning	Quarterback	Indianapolis Colts
Coach of the Year	Marvin Lewis	Head coach	Cincinnati Bengals
Offensive Player of the Year	Chris Johnson	Running Back	Tennessee Titans
Defensive Player of the Year	Charles Woodson	Cornerback	Green Bay Packers
Offensive Rookie of the Year	Percy Harvin	Wide Receiver	Minnesota Vikings
Defensive Rookie of the Year	Brian Cushing	Linebacker	Houston Texans
NFL Comeback Player of the Year	Tom Brady	Quarterback	New England Patriots
Walter Payton NFL Man of the Year	Brian Waters	Guard	Kansas City Chiefs
Super Bowl Most Valuable Player Award	Drew Brees	Quarterback	New Orleans Saints

=== Team superlatives ===
==== Offense ====
- Most points scored: New Orleans, 510
- Fewest points scored: St. Louis, 175
- Most total offensive yards: New Orleans, 6,461
- Fewest total offensive yards: Cleveland, 4,163
- Most total passing yards: Houston, 4,654
- Fewest total passing yards: Cleveland, 2,076
- Most rushing yards: New York Jets, 2,756
- Fewest rushing yards: Indianapolis, 1,294

==== Defense ====
- Fewest points allowed: New York Jets, 236
- Most points allowed: Detroit, 494
- Most total yards allowed: Detroit, 6,274
- Fewest total yards allowed: New York Jets, 4,037
- Fewest passing yards allowed: New York Jets, 2,459
- Most passing yards allowed: Detroit, 4,249
- Fewest rushing yards allowed: Green Bay, 1,333
- Most rushing yards allowed: Tampa Bay, 2,531

=== All-Pro team ===
The following players were named first team All-Pro by the Associated Press:

Offense
Quarterback	Peyton Manning, Indianapolis
Running back	Adrian Peterson, Minnesota; Chris Johnson, Tennessee
Fullback	Leonard Weaver, Philadelphia
Wide receiver	Andre Johnson, Houston; Wes Welker, New England
Tight end	Dallas Clark, Indianapolis
Offensive tackle	Ryan Clady, Denver; Joe Thomas, Cleveland
Offensive guard	Steve Hutchinson, Minnesota; Jahri Evans, New Orleans
Center	Nick Mangold, New York Jets

Defense
Defensive end	Dwight Freeney, Indianapolis; Jared Allen, Minnesota
Defensive tackle	Jay Ratliff, Dallas; Kevin Williams, Minnesota
Outside linebacker	DeMarcus Ware, Dallas; Elvis Dumervil, Denver
Inside linebacker	Ray Lewis, Baltimore; Patrick Willis, San Francisco
Cornerback	Charles Woodson, Green Bay; Darrelle Revis, New York Jets
Safety	Darren Sharper, New Orleans; Adrian Wilson, Arizona

Special teams
Kicker	Nate Kaeding, San Diego
Punter	Shane Lechler, Oakland
Kick returner	Joshua Cribbs, Cleveland

=== Players of the Week/Month ===
Week/ Month	Offensive Player of the Week/Month		Defensive Player of the Week/Month		Special Teams Player of the Week/Month	
Week/ Month	AFC	NFC	AFC	NFC	AFC	NFC
1	Tom Brady QB (New England)	Drew Brees QB (New Orleans)	David Harris LB (NY Jets)	Justin Tuck DE (NY Giants)	Jeff Reed K (Pittsburgh)	DeSean Jackson PR-WR (Philadelphia)
2	Matt Schaub QB (Houston)	Frank Gore RB (San Francisco)	Antwan Odom DE (Cincinnati)	Chad Greenway LB (Minnesota)	Rian Lindell K (Buffalo)	Calais Campbell DE (Arizona)
3	Maurice Jones-Drew RB (Jacksonville)	Kevin Kolb QB (Philadelphia)	Brendon Ayanbadejo LB (Baltimore)	Lance Briggs LB (Chicago)	Jason Trusnik LB (NY Jets)	Percy Harvin KR-WR (Minnesota)
Sept.	Peyton Manning QB (Indianapolis)	Drew Brees QB (New Orleans)	Antwan Odom DE (Cincinnati)	Charles Woodson CB (Green Bay)	Matt Prater K (Denver)	DeSean Jackson PR-WR (Philadelphia)
4	Rashard Mendenhall RB (Pittsburgh)	Brett Favre QB (Minnesota)	Champ Bailey CB (Denver)	Darren Sharper S (New Orleans)	Jacoby Jones KR-WR (Houston)	Johnny Knox KR-WR (Chicago)
5	Kyle Orton QB (Denver)	Miles Austin WR (Dallas)	James Harrison LB (Pittsburgh)	Dominique Rodgers-Cromartie CB (Arizona)	Dave Zastudil P (Cleveland)	Jason Baker P (Carolina)
6	Tom Brady QB (New England)	Drew Brees QB (New Orleans)	Brian Cushing LB (Houston)	Thomas DeCoud S (Atlanta)	Eddie Royal KR-PR-WR (Denver)	Sammie Stroughter KR-WR (Tampa Bay)
7	Carson Palmer QB (Cincinnati)	DeSean Jackson WR (Philadelphia)	Brandon Meriweather S (New England)	Adrian Wilson S (Arizona)	Brian Moorman P (Buffalo)	Patrick Crayton PR-WR (Dallas)
Oct.	Tom Brady QB (New England)	Aaron Rodgers QB (Green Bay)	James Harrison LB (Pittsburgh)	Darren Sharper S (New Orleans)	Eddie Royal KR-PR-WR (Denver)	Johnny Knox KR-WR (Chicago)
8	Chris Johnson RB (Tennessee)	Brett Favre QB (Minnesota)	Brian Cushing LB (Houston)	Julius Peppers DE (Carolina)	Ted Ginn Jr. WR-KR (Miami)	Josh Brown K (St. Louis)
9	Dallas Clark TE (Indianapolis)	Kurt Warner QB (Arizona)	Tyrone Carter S (Pittsburgh)	Anthony Hargrove DT (New Orleans)	Stephen Gostkowski K (New England)	Clifton Smith KR-PR (Tampa Bay)
10	Peyton Manning QB (Indianapolis)	Sidney Rice WR (Minnesota)	Mike Brown S (Kansas City)	Charles Woodson CB (Green Bay)	Bernard Scott KR-RB (Cincinnati)	Hunter Smith P (Washington)
11	Ricky Williams RB (Miami)	Matthew Stafford QB (Detroit)	Leigh Bodden CB (New England)	Michael Boley LB (NY Giants)	Jamaal Charles KR-RB (Kansas City)	Thomas Morstead P (New Orleans)
12	Vince Young QB (Tennessee)	Drew Brees QB (New Orleans)	Darrelle Revis CB (NY Jets)	Charles Woodson CB (Green Bay)	Matt Prater K (Denver)	LaRod Stephens-Howling KR (Arizona)
Nov.	Chris Johnson RB (Tennessee)	Brett Favre QB (Minnesota)	Robert Mathis DE (Indianapolis)	Charles Woodson CB (Green Bay)	Ted Ginn Jr. WR-KR (Miami)	David Akers K (Philadelphia)
13	Bruce Gradkowski QB (Oakland)	Kurt Warner QB (Arizona)	Justin Durant LB (Jacksonville)	Clay Matthews LB (Green Bay)	Dan Carpenter K (Miami)	Domenik Hixon PR (NY Giants)
14	Brandon Marshall WR (Denver)	Frank Gore RB (San Francisco)	Keith Bulluck LB (Tennessee)	Brian Orakpo LB (Washington)	Joshua Cribbs KR-WR (Cleveland)	DeSean Jackson PR-WR (Philadelphia)
15	Ben Roethlisberger QB (Pittsburgh)	Jonathan Stewart RB (Carolina)	Domonique Foxworth CB (Baltimore)	DeMarcus Ware LB (Dallas)	Joshua Cribbs KR-WR (Cleveland)	Ben Graham P (Arizona)
16	Tom Brady QB (New England)	Jay Cutler QB (Chicago)	LaMarr Woodley LB (Pittsburgh)	Jon Beason LB (Carolina)	Brad Smith KR-WR (NY Jets)	Micheal Spurlock PR-WR (Tampa Bay)
17	Willis McGahee RB (Baltimore)	Brett Favre QB (Minnesota)	Derrick Johnson LB (Kansas City)	Anthony Spencer LB (Dallas)	Nate Kaeding K (San Diego)	Thomas Morstead P (New Orleans)
Dec.	Philip Rivers QB (San Diego)	Tony Romo QB (Dallas)	Darrelle Revis CB (NY Jets)	Charles Woodson CB (Green Bay)	Joshua Cribbs KR-WR (Cleveland)	DeSean Jackson PR-WR (Philadelphia)

Month	Rookie of the Month	
Month	Offensive	Defensive
Sept.	Mark Sanchez QB (NY Jets)	Louis Delmas S (Detroit)
Oct.	Hakeem Nicks WR (NY Giants)	Jairus Byrd S (Buffalo)
Nov.	Percy Harvin WR-KR (Minnesota)	Brian Cushing LB (Houston)
Dec./Jan.	Michael Oher OT (Baltimore)	Brian Cushing LB (Houston)

== Head coach/front office changes ==
=== Head coach ===
Offseason

Eight teams hired new head coaches prior to the start of the 2009 season, while two made their interim coaches permanent, and another moved from one team to another after being fired by a team:

Team	2009 Coach	2008 Coach(es)	Reason for leaving	Notes
Cleveland Browns	Eric Mangini, former head coach of the New York Jets (see below)	Romeo Crennel	Fired	Crennel compiled a 24–40 (.375) record in four seasons as the Browns' head coach. Browns GM Phil Savage was fired at the same time.
Denver Broncos	Josh McDaniels, former offensive coordinator of the New England Patriots	Mike Shanahan	Fired	Shanahan, the second-longest tenured head coach in the league (hired in 1995), was relieved of his duties after a 146–91 record (.616), two Super Bowl titles (XXXII and XXXIII), three division titles, and seven playoff appearances in fourteen seasons in Colorado. The Broncos let a three-game division lead slip away over the last month of the 2008 season and missed the playoffs for the third straight year. McDaniels, who has been an offensive and defensive assistant with the Patriots, led the Patriots offense (led by Matt Cassel, who had not started a football game since high school) to an 11-win season in 2008. Cassel became the starter after Tom Brady suffered a season ending knee injury.
Detroit Lions	Jim Schwartz, former defensive coordinator for the Tennessee Titans	Rod Marinelli	Fired	Marinelli was fired after the Lions suffered the worst season in NFL history, a record 0–16 finish, the NFL's first perfectly bad season in 32 years. In three years with the Lions, he compiled a 10–38 (.208) record. (Earlier in the season, team president and general manager Matt Millen had also been fired.) Schwartz had been with the Titans since 2001, and in 2008, under Schwartz's leadership, the Titans allowed only 14.6 points per game, second in the NFL. Marinelli would later become the defensive line/assistant head coach for the Chicago Bears.
Kansas City Chiefs	Todd Haley, former Arizona Cardinals offensive coordinator	Herman Edwards	Fired	Edwards was released on January 23 by new team general manager Scott Pioli, who was hired a week earlier. Edwards has been the coach in Kansas City the past three seasons, and during his tenure, the Chiefs focused on becoming younger. This lack of experience was reflected in a record of 6–26 (.188) under Edwards the last two seasons, after a 9–7 record his first season. Before joining the Chiefs, Edwards was head coach of the New York Jets for five seasons. Haley, whose high-powered passing offense was the predominant factor in the Cardinals' run to their first ever Super Bowl appearance, was named head coach February 6. Edwards would become an analyst for ESPN, and would eventually return to head coaching in 2018 at Arizona State.
Indianapolis Colts	Jim Caldwell, associate head coach and quarterback coach	Tony Dungy	Retired	Dungy retired on January 12, after a 13-year head coaching career that saw him go 148–79 (.652) with Tampa Bay (1996–2001) and Indianapolis (2002–08), including a win in Super Bowl XLI in 2007, beating his friend, Lovie Smith (Chicago Bears coach) and becoming the first African-American coach to win a Super Bowl. This followed a 16-year career (1980–95) as a defensive assistant coach in both college football and the NFL. Dungy appeared on NBC's coverage of Super Bowl XLIII and is now an analyst on NBC's Football Night in America.
New York Jets	Rex Ryan, former Baltimore Ravens defensive coordinator	Eric Mangini	Fired	Despite an 8–3 start in 2008, the Jets finished the season 1–4, with the only win coming against an equally skidding Buffalo Bills team, leading to Mangini's firing. Mangini coached three seasons with the Jets and compiled a 23–25 (.479) record; he was hired as the head coach of the Cleveland Browns nine days after being released by the Jets. Ryan, one of the two identical twin sons of former Jets defensive coach and Eagles and Cardinals head coach Buddy Ryan, agreed to a four-year contract hours following the Ravens' loss to the Pittsburgh Steelers in the AFC Championship Game.
Oakland Raiders	Tom Cable, offensive line coach	Lane Kiffin	Fired	Kiffin was fired September 30, 2008, after 5–15 mark (.250) in 1 1/4 seasons as coach and a feud with owner Al Davis. Kiffin would be named the new coach at the University of Tennessee on December 1, replacing Phillip Fulmer. Cable, who previously served as the offensive line coach under Kiffin and previously coached at the University of Idaho, went 4–8 as interim coach of the Raiders and was retained as coach February 4, 2009.
St. Louis Rams	Steve Spagnuolo, former New York Giants defensive coordinator	Scott Linehan; Defensive coordinator Jim Haslett (interim for 12 games)	Fired	Linehan was fired September 29, 2008, after going 11–25 (.306) over 2 1/4 seasons as coach; After turning down an offer from the San Francisco 49ers to be their offensive coordinator, he took the position of offensive coordinator with the Detroit Lions. Haslett went 2–10 as interim coach, but was told he would not be retained on January 15; Haslett has jumped to the United Football League, where he is now the coach of the Florida Tuskers. Spagnuolo rose to fame after his defense led the Giants to a win in Super Bowl XLII (ruining the New England Patriots' perfect season), and got a four-year contract on January 17 to take over as Rams coach.
San Francisco 49ers	Mike Singletary, assistant head coach and linebackers coach	Mike Nolan	Fired	Nolan was fired October 20 after an 18–37 mark (.327) over nearly 3 1/2 seasons as coach. Singletary, who went 5–4 as interim coach in 2008, was rewarded with a four-year contract on December 28 following their 27–24 win over the Washington Redskins. Nolan would become defensive coordinator for the Denver Broncos.
Seattle Seahawks	Jim L. Mora, assistant head coach and defensive backs coach and former head coach of the Atlanta Falcons.	Mike Holmgren	Retired	After 10 years of head coaching with the Seahawks, it was announced that Holmgren would step down as head coach after the 2008 season, with Mora as his automatic successor. In his time with the Seahawks, Holmgren compiled a record of 86–74 (.541), with five division titles, six playoff appearances, including the Seahawks' first appearance in the Super Bowl and its first conference title (2005).
Tampa Bay Buccaneers	Raheem Morris, defensive backs coach	Jon Gruden	Fired	After his arrival from Oakland for two first-round picks, two second-round picks, and $8 million, Gruden – who was fired along with general manager Bruce Allen – became the Buccaneers' most successful coach, winning Super Bowl XXXVII over the Raiders in 2003. The team's late season collapse after starting with a 9–3 record and the lead position in the NFC South may have been the main reason for Gruden's firing. In seven seasons with the Buccaneers, Gruden compiled a 57–55 (.509) regular season record and was 3–2 in the playoffs. Morris, who was previously the defensive backs coach, was promoted to defensive coordinator after Monte Kiffin announced he would leave to join his son Lane at the University of Tennessee. Gruden worked for NFL Network at the 2009 Draft and was an analyst for Monday Night Football on ESPN. In 2018, he returned as the head coach of the Raiders.

In-season

The following coaches were fired during the 2009 season:

Team	Interim coach	Ex-coach	Reason for leaving	Notes
Buffalo Bills	Perry Fewell, defensive coordinator	Dick Jauron	Fired Nov 17 after 9 games	In 3 1/2 years with the Bills, all of them losing seasons, Jauron compiled a 24–33 (.421) record, including a 3–6 record at the time of his firing. He had particularly poor records against the AFC East (8–13, 0–7 against the New England Patriots), in night games (winless) and against teams with winning records (2–21). Perry Fewell, Jauron's replacement, had never been a head coach at any level.

=== Front office ===
Offseason

Team	Position	2008 office holder	Reason for leaving	2009 replacement	Notes
Cleveland Browns	GM	Phil Savage	Fired	George Kokinis	Savage compiled a 24–40 (.375) record in four seasons as the Browns' general manager. Browns HC Romeo Crennel was fired at the same time. As director of pro personnel for the Ravens, Kokinis was responsible for analyzing NFL rosters and assessing the free agent market. He also assisted in contract negotiation for some of the team's draft picks.
Denver Broncos	GM	Jim Goodman (interim)	Fired	Brian Xanders	Xanders had been hired the previous offseason as the assistant general manager. Owner Pat Bowlen fired Jim Goodman and appointed Xanders as the team's sole general manager on February 12, 2009. Xanders and new head coach Josh McDaniels engineered a personnel transformation where 85 percent of the team's roster was overhauled before the 2009 season began.
Indianapolis Colts	GM	Bill Polian	Resigned	Chris Polian	Bill Polian stepped down as general manager in 2009, but remains with the team as president and vice-chairman. He is succeeded by his son Chris, who was promoted from vice president of football operations.
Jacksonville Jaguars	GM	James "Shack" Harris	Resigned	Gene Smith	Smith became the first general manager in Jaguars history on January 12, 2009, after the resignation of James "Shack" Harris, who had been the team's vice-president of player personnel.
Kansas City Chiefs	GM	Carl Peterson	Resigned	Scott Pioli	On December 15, 2008, Chiefs Chairman and acting owner Clark Hunt announced Peterson's resignation effective January 15, 2009. Pioli had previously worked in the Patriots organization as vice president of player personnel.
St. Louis Rams	GM	Jay Zygmunt	Resigned	Billy Devaney	Zygmunt resigned on December 22, 2008, the day after a week 16 loss to the San Francisco 49ers that dropped the Ram's record to 2–13. In February 2008 the Rams hired Devaney as vice president of pro personnel to help conduct their 2008 draft. He was promoted to general manager of the Rams after Zygmunt's resignation.
Tampa Bay Buccaneers	GM	Bruce Allen	Fired	Mark Dominik	Bruce Allen was hired in 2004. Allen had previously worked with then-head coach Jon Gruden in Oakland. Like Gruden, the team's late season collapse from a 9–3 record to 9–7 and no playoffs was likely also the main reason Allen was fired. Dominik previously was the director of pro personnel.

In-season

Team	Position	Departing office holder	Reason for leaving	Interim replacement	Notes
Cleveland Browns	GM	George Kokinis	Fired	vacant	After a 1–7 start, Kokinis was reportedly escorted from the Cleveland Browns team facility by security on November 2, 2009. The team later released a statement saying he was "no longer actively involved with the organization."
Washington Redskins	GM	Vinny Cerrato	Resigned	Bruce Allen	Cerrato was (re)hired as vice president of football operations in 2002. Cerrato resigned from the team on December 17, 2009, and Allen was hired as general manager the same day. Owner Daniel Snyder later admitted in an interview that the failure of 2008 head coach hire Jim Zorn was the reason that Cerrato was forced out.
Seattle Seahawks	GM	Tim Ruskell	Resigned	Ruston Webster	Ruskell was forced to resign from his position as the Seahawks' president of football operations on December 2, 2009. The Seahawks were 4–7 at the time and had finished with a 4–12 record the year before.

== Stadium changes ==
The 2009 season was the first season for the new Cowboys Stadium in Arlington, replacing Texas Stadium in Irving.

Dolphin Stadium was renamed Land Shark Stadium after a naming rights deal was signed with the Land Shark beer that was sold at Jimmy Buffett's Margaritaville restaurant chain.

This season also served as the last season for Giants Stadium, as both the New York Giants and Jets moved into a new stadium for 2010. The Giants exited with an auspicious 41–9 loss to Carolina on December 27, while the Jets defeated the Cincinnati Bengals by a 37–0 score in the season finale on Sunday night, January 3, 2010.

== Uniforms ==
After having no major uniform changes for the 2008 NFL season, the trend of at least one major uniform change per season among the 32 teams returned with two major uniform changes, as well as one with some minor modifications.

The San Francisco 49ers, who had been long-rumored to be returning to their 1964–1995 uniforms (and have had the red variation of those uniforms as their third uniform since the 2002 season) did so for this season. The team returned to a brighter, scarlet red and a less metallic "49ers gold" as its team colors, replacing the darker cardinal red and the more metallic "49ers gold" which the team has worn since it last overhauled their uniforms in 1996. The new uniforms were unveiled on April 25, 2009.

The Jacksonville Jaguars got new uniforms for the 2009 season. Team owner Wayne Weaver reportedly wanted to "clean up" the look, feeling that the team has too many uniform styles. The changes aren't a complete overhaul, but similar to the Atlanta Falcons and Minnesota Vikings' recent overhauls. The new uniforms were introduced at a press conference on April 22.

The Detroit Lions designated their popular 1950s-era throwbacks as their third uniform and completely dropped their unpopular black jerseys. The team had not worn the throwbacks from 2005 to 2007 to make room for the Matt Millen-designated black jerseys. In addition, the team unveiled a new helmet logo on April 20, updating "Bubbles" with a fiercer look and wordmark, with modified uniforms. Those logos were accidentally leaked by NFL.com in their online shop, then quickly removed on March 23, 2009.

Besides the above-mentioned throwbacks for the 50th anniversary season of the AFL, the Tampa Bay Buccaneers wore their "Creamsicle" throwbacks for the November 8 home game against the Green Bay Packers, in conjunction with the creation of the Buccaneers Ring of Honor. The Buccaneers defeated the Packers 38–28, the only home game the team won in 2009.

The St. Louis Rams wore their 1973–1999 blue uniforms in select home games to honor former owner Georgia Frontiere, who died in early 2008 (too late to inform the NFL about wearing a throwback uniform in her honor during the 2008 season; the team instead opted for a memorial patch) and also celebrate the tenth anniversary of their win in Super Bowl XXXIV. Ironically, the Rams cut ties with its last two remaining offensive players from the "Greatest Show on Turf" era during the offseason by releasing Orlando Pace and Torry Holt for salary cap reasons plus opting for a rebuilding mode after a 2–14 season in 2008 (second only to the Lions' historic 0–16 season) and no trips to the postseason since the 2004 season. Defensive end Leonard Little is the only player remaining who wore the pre-2000 uniforms again in 2009. These uniforms were worn on October 11 against the Vikings and December 20 against the Texans.

The Cleveland Browns, Dallas Cowboys, Minnesota Vikings, and Pittsburgh Steelers retained their throwback alternates worn in previous seasons. The Atlanta Falcons wore replicas of their first season uniforms from 1966, in lieu of their all-black uniforms. The Tennessee Titans wore a Number 9 decal on the back of their helmets to honor former Titans quarterback Steve McNair, who was killed on July 4, while the Philadelphia Eagles wore a decal with the initials of Jim Johnson, their longtime defensive coordinator who died on July 28. The Seattle Seahawks also unveiled a lime green jersey with blue shoulders, to pay tribute to the new Major League Soccer team with whom they share Qwest Field. The jersey No. 71 was retired for former offensive lineman Walter Jones on December 9, 2009.

The Miami Dolphins, after a four-year hiatus, brought back their alternate orange jerseys and wore them against the New York Jets on October 12.

== Media ==
=== Television ===
This was the fourth season under the television contracts with the league's television partners: CBS (all AFC Sunday afternoon away games and one Thanksgiving game), Fox (all NFC Sunday afternoon away games and one Thanksgiving game), NBC (16 Sunday night games and the kickoff game), ESPN (17 Monday night games over sixteen weeks), NFL Network (eight late-season games on Thursday and Saturday nights, including one Thanksgiving game and a Christmas night game), and DirecTV's NFL Sunday Ticket package. These agreements with CBS, Fox and DirecTV were extended two years through the 2013 season on May 19, 2009, and NBC's contract was also extended through that same season on August 19 of the same year; these extensions were done so they all coincided with the 2013 expiration date on ESPN's contract.

CBS celebrated their 50th season of NFL coverage; CBS has covered NFL games from 1956 to 1993 and again from 1998 to the present. Ironically, CBS which was ordered by the NFL not to give American Football League scores during its NFL broadcasts of the 1960s, now covers the AFC, while Fox covers the NFC. This season was also the fortieth consecutive season that Monday Night Football has been a permanent part of the NFL schedule, though the league had played games on Monday night sporadically before this. Monday Night Football originally aired on ABC before switching to ESPN in 2006, when the two networks' sports operations were merged. The first Monday night of the regular season featured two AFL Original Eight games, a doubleheader with the Bills at the Patriots and the Chargers at the Raiders.

NFL Network continued to have coverage disputes with major cable providers. In particular, Comcast, the largest cable provider in the United States, was considering removing the network from its lineups on April 30, 2009, shortly after the draft but before the start of the preseason. Comcast was carrying the network on a digital sports tier and negotiations continued past the April 30 deadline as NFLN would continue on Comcast, which ended with a resolution on May 19 that could open the door for other major cable providers such as Cablevision and Cox to carry the network on a what would be equal to Comcast's digital classic tier, with around 10 million subscribers. However, the most notable holdout, Time Warner Cable, still is nowhere near a deal. Additionally, the NFL Network created a new "Red Zone Channel" starting with the season openers September 13. Comcast-owned Versus has signed a deal to carry United Football League games on Thursday nights; the tail end of the UFL schedule overlapped with the first few weeks of the Thursday night NFL package. In related news, the NFL has reached a settlement with DISH Network over the satellite provider's decision to move NFL Network to a higher tier. NFL Network has also dropped the use of the names "Run to the Playoffs" and "Saturday Night Football", opting to standardize all of its broadcasts under the "Thursday Night Football" banner. The Saturday night and Friday night games airing on the network was marketed as "Thursday Night Football Special Edition".

This was also the first NFL season after the DTV transition in the United States, which had originally been scheduled to take place on February 17, 2009, but was delayed until June 12, 2009. Hawaiʻi made the digital switchover on January 15, 2009. (Low-power translators will still be allowed to broadcast in analog until at least 2012, and cable providers will continue to distribute analog signals for the foreseeable future.)

After fifty seasons as a player, coach, broadcaster and video game maven, John Madden retired on April 16 from his position on Sunday Night Football. Cris Collinsworth moved from NFL Network to NBC to assume Madden's in-game analyst role with Al Michaels; Matt Millen replaced Collinsworth on NFL Network, while Tony Dungy and Rodney Harrison replaced Collinsworth and Jerome Bettis as studio analysts on NBC's Football Night in America pregame show. In addition, Tony Kornheiser left MNF and former Raiders and Buccaneers coach Jon Gruden replaced him.

=== Radio ===
In radio, it was reported that the league was exploring ending its contract with Westwood One or sharing games with another network due to Westwood One's financial problems. The Sports USA Radio Network, ESPN Radio and Sporting News Radio were mentioned as possible partners; Fox Sports Radio was notably excluded from consideration. Sports USA currently carries Sunday afternoon games by agreement with individual teams, while ESPN carries the NBA and Major League Baseball, the latter causing a potential schedule conflict between Sunday Night Football and Sunday Night Baseball, plus the MLB Playoffs. Sunday night, Monday night, Thanksgiving and all other Thursday and Saturday games are covered by the contract. Of the offers, Westwood One was the high bidder (and reportedly the only one offering guaranteed money), ESPN requested a longer-term deal, the Sporting News offered a revenue-sharing plan in lieu of rights fees, and Sports USA was described as a "long shot". After a restructuring shored up the company's financial situation, Westwood One in March 2009 earned a two-year extension for all of the night games, paying US$33,000,000 for the two-year deal.

In addition to the official feature game package, three networks will carry nationwide radio broadcasts of Sunday afternoon games. The newest such network is Compass Media Networks, which has signed deals with eight teams. Sports USA and Westwood One will carry games from the other 24 teams. Dial Global, which previously backed Sports USA's coverage in 2008, will instead handle Compass's package for 2009.
