= 2006 NFL season =

American football season

Regular season
- Duration: September 7 – December 31, 2006

Playoffs
- Start date: January 6, 2007
- AFC Champions: Indianapolis Colts
- NFC Champions: Chicago Bears

Super Bowl XLI
- Date: February 4, 2007
- Site: Dolphin Stadium, Miami Gardens, Florida
- Champions: Indianapolis Colts

Pro Bowl
- Date: February 10, 2007
- Site: Aloha Stadium

AFC teams: West, North, South, East
NFC teams: West, North, South, East

The 2006 NFL season was the 87th regular season of the National Football League (NFL). Regular season play was held from September 7 to December 31, 2006.

The season began with the reigning Super Bowl XL champion Pittsburgh Steelers defeating the Miami Dolphins in the NFL Kickoff game.

The NFL title was eventually won by the Indianapolis Colts, when they defeated the Chicago Bears 29–17 in Super Bowl XLI at Dolphin Stadium at Miami Gardens, Florida on February 4, 2007.

== New NFL commissioner ==
On March 20, 2006, Paul Tagliabue announced his plans to retire as NFL commissioner. During an NFL meeting in Northbrook, Illinois, on August 8, league team owners selected Roger Goodell, the NFL's then-current chief operating officer, as the new commissioner. Tagliabue continued to serve as commissioner until Goodell officially replaced him on Friday September 1.

Tagliabue became NFL commissioner on October 26, 1989. During his tenure, the league added four new teams; saw four franchises move (including two franchises—the Rams and Raiders—from Los Angeles, the second-largest television market in the United States); the construction of seventeen new stadiums; began its own in-house television specialty cable network, the NFL Network; greatly increased television rights fees with its broadcasters, including the addition of the Fox network and its NFL programming; and maintained labor peace with the players' union.

== Draft ==
The 2006 NFL draft was held from April 29 to 30, 2006, at New York City's Radio City Music Hall. With the first pick, the Houston Texans selected defensive end Mario Williams from North Carolina State University.

== New referees ==
Bernie Kukar and Tom White retired. Jerome Boger and Gene Steratore were promoted to referee. Umpire Butch Hannah returned to his position after sitting out half of the 2005 season with various injuries.

== Notable retirements ==
- Jerry Azumah
- Ahmed Plummer
- Jerry Rice (as a one day contract with the 49ers)
- Jimmy Smith
- Eddie George
- Peter Boulware
- Wayne Chrebet
- Tony Banks
- Dat Nguyen
- Charlie Garner
- Paul Grasmanis
- Jamaar Taylor
- Troy Hambrick
- Tony Boselli
- Brad Lekkerkerker
- Dorsey Levens
- Todd Washington
- Todd Peterson
- Richie Anderson
- Victor Green
- Tommy Maddox
- Jerome Bettis
- Dale Carter
- Doug Flutie
- Dewayne Washington
- Chris Mohr
- Deion Sanders
- Brady Smith
- Dez White
- Bob Hallen
- Calvin Branch
- Kordell Stewart

== Major rule changes ==
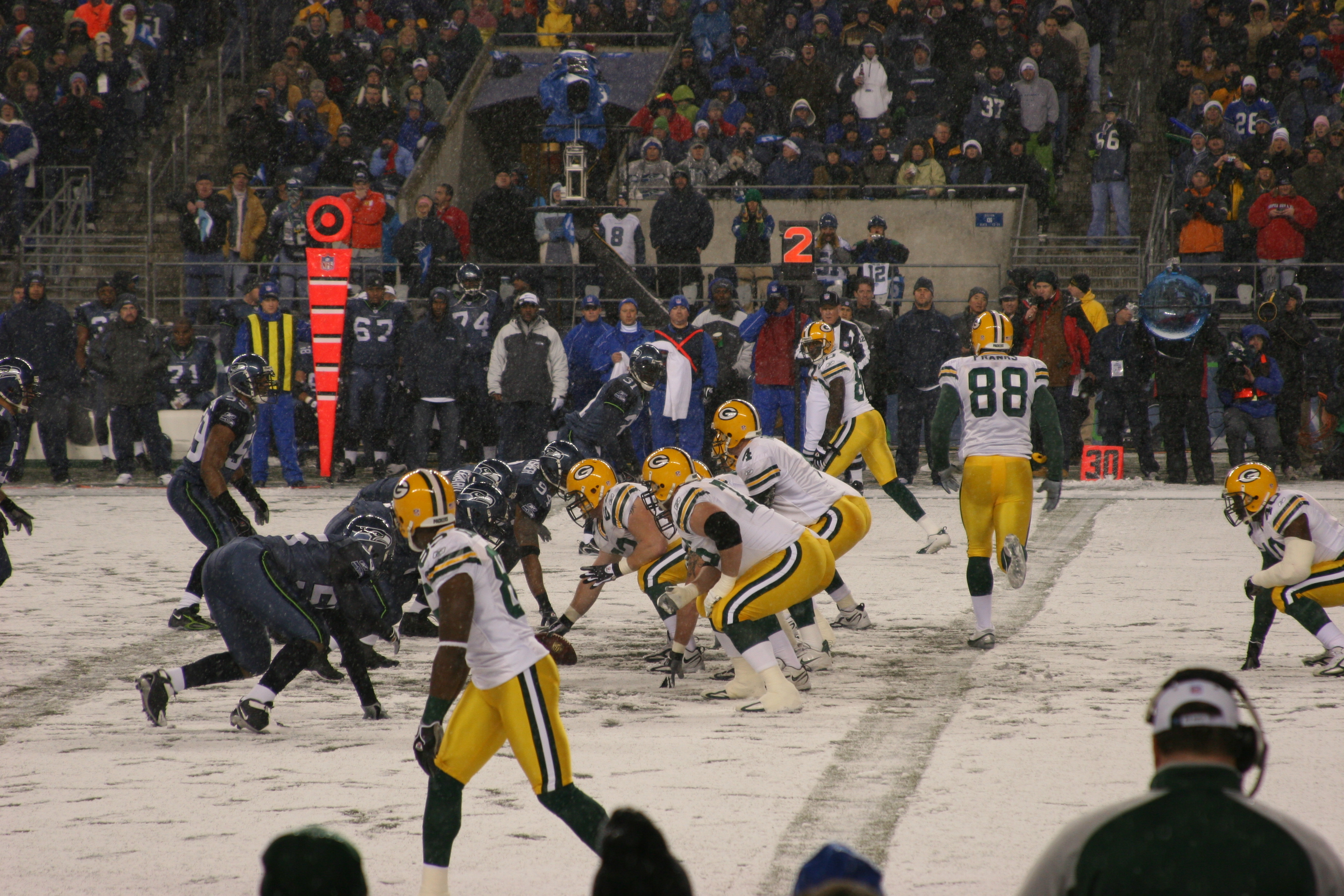
The Seattle Seahawks host the Green Bay Packers in snow at Qwest Field, November 27, 2006

- End zone celebrations became more restricted. Players cannot celebrate by using any type of prop, or do any act in which they are on the ground. Players may still spike, spin the ball, or (until 2014), dunk it over the goal posts. Dancing in the end zone is also permitted as long as it is not a prolonged or group celebration. The Lambeau Leap, though, is still legal.
- Defenders were prohibited from hitting a passer in the knee or below unless they are blocked into him. This rule was enacted in response to the previous season's injuries to Cincinnati Bengals quarterback Carson Palmer, Pittsburgh Steelers' Ben Roethlisberger, and Tampa Bay Buccaneers' Brian Griese.
- Down-by-contact calls could now be reviewed by instant replay to determine if a player fumbled the ball before he was down, and who recovered it. Previously, these plays could not be reversed once officials blew the whistle.
- The "horse-collar tackle" rule enacted during the previous 2005 season was expanded. Players are now prohibited from tackling a ball carrier from the rear by tugging inside his jersey. Previously, it was only illegal if the tackler's hand got inside the player's shoulder pads.
- To reduce injuries, defensive players cannot line up directly over the long snapper during field goal and extra point attempts.

=== Officials' uniform makeover ===
The 2006 season marked the debut of new officiating uniforms which are supposed to be more comfortable for officials to wear in extreme weather over the old polyester uniforms. The uniforms were designed by Reebok using a proprietary material technology to keep officials both warm and dry during the winter months of the season. On the shirt, the position and number are removed from the front pocket and the lettering and numbers on the back side were black-on-white and are smaller print and the sleeve shows the uniform number. Officials also wore full-length black pants with white stripe during the winter months to stay warm, which was criticized by media. Also, a black stripe was added to each side of the white knickers. This was the first major design overhaul since 1979, when the position name was added to the shirt, but later abbreviated in 1982.

=== Return of "The Duke" football ===
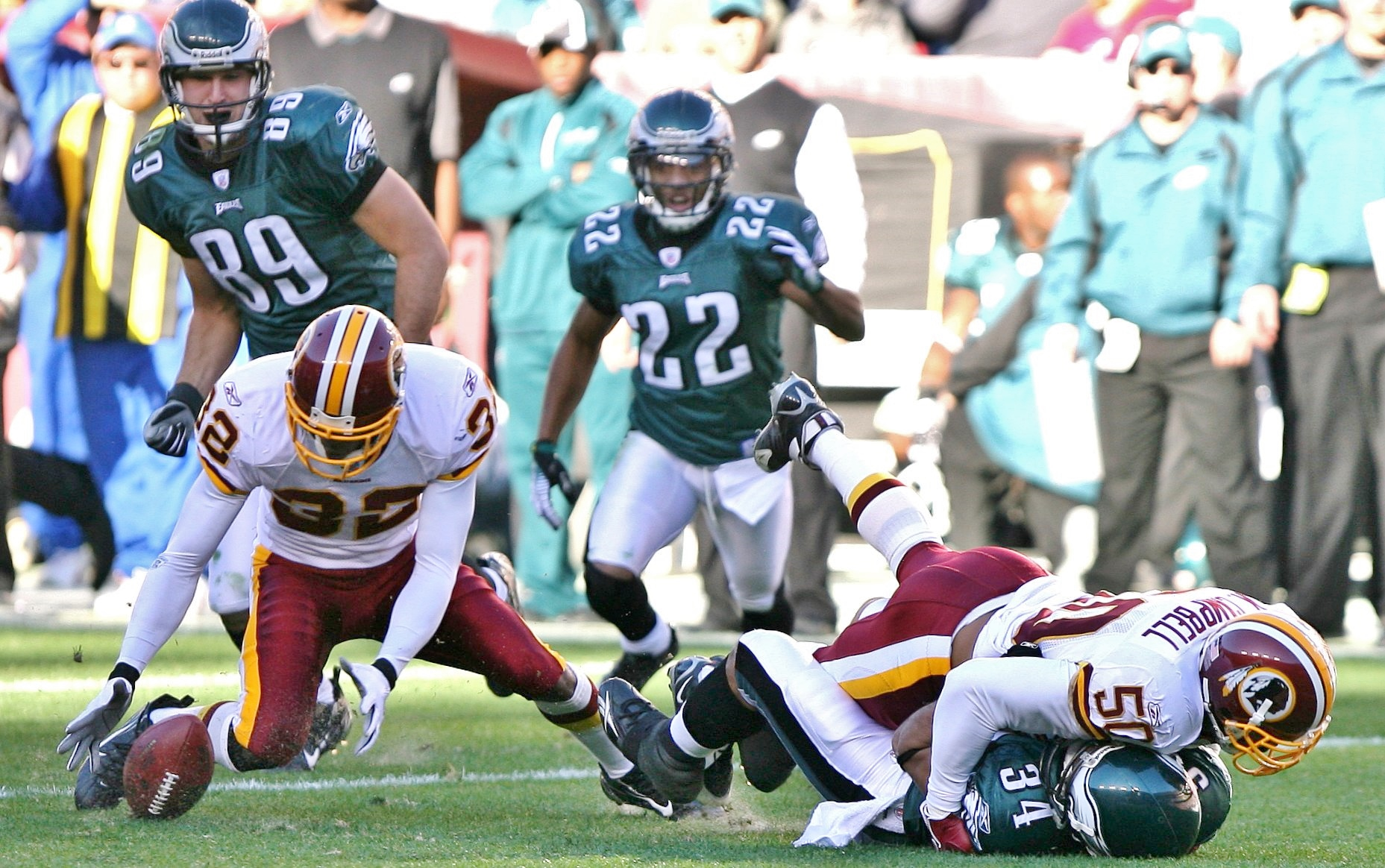
A Philadelphia fumble is recovered by Washington's Ade Jimoh, week 14

For the first time since Super Bowl IV at the conclusion of the 1969 season, the official NFL game ball was known as "The Duke" in honor of Wellington Mara, whose family owns the New York Giants. Son John is the current CEO of the team. The NFL first used "The Duke" ball in honor of owner Tim Mara (Wellington's father) made a deal with Wilson Sporting Goods to become the league's official supplier of game balls, a relationship that continued into its sixty-fifth year in 2006.

"The Duke" ball was discontinued after the 1970 AFL–NFL merger, and the merged league began using a different standardized ball made by Wilson. The only other time that "The Duke" ball name was used was during the two "Thanksgiving Classic" games in 2004.

One side of the new 2006 "Duke" football featured the NFL shield logo in gold, the words "The Duke", and the NFL commissioner's signature. The obverse side has a small NFL logo above the needle bladder hole, the conference names between the hole, and the words "National Football League" in gold. As per the custom, specially branded balls were used for the first week of the 2006 season (the "Opening Kickoff") as well as for the Thanksgiving Day, conference championships, Super Bowl XLI and Pro Bowl games.

== 2006 deaths ==
=== Death of Lamar Hunt ===
Lamar Hunt died in Dallas, Texas on December 13 from complications from prostate cancer at the age of 74. He is credited with challenging the NFL with the formation of the American Football League, which led to the subsequent merger of the two leagues.

=== Death of two Broncos ===
At 3 a.m. on January 1, 2007, Denver Broncos cornerback Darrent Williams was shot and killed in Denver, within hours after the last regular season game against the San Francisco 49ers. Less than two months later, on February 24, 2007, Broncos running back Damien Nash collapsed and died after a charity basketball game at a high school. Both players died at the age of 24.

== Regular season ==
=== Schedule formula ===
Based on the NFL's scheduling formula, the intraconference and interconference matchups for 2006 were:

Intraconference

- AFC East vs. AFC South
- AFC North vs. AFC West
- NFC East vs. NFC South
- NFC North vs. NFC West

Interconference

- AFC East vs. NFC North
- AFC North vs. NFC South
- AFC South vs. NFC East
- AFC West vs. NFC West

Highlights of the 2006 season included:

- NFL Kickoff Game: The season began with the Kickoff Game on September 7, 2006, featuring the Super Bowl XL champion Pittsburgh Steelers defeating the Miami Dolphins.
- NFL on Thanksgiving:
  - The 2006 season introduced a new Thanksgiving primetime game, which launched the new Thursday Night Football package. Unlike the traditional afternoon doubleheader, this game does not have tie-ins with specific home teams, and would feature the Denver Broncos at the Kansas City Chiefs.

=== Flexible scheduling added to regular season ===
This was the first season that the NFL used a "flexible-scheduling" for the last few weeks of the season, allowing the league flexibility in selecting games to air on Sunday night, in order to feature the current hottest, streaking teams. This was implemented to prevent games featuring losing teams from airing during primetime late in the season, while at the same time allowing NBC to rake in more money off the higher ratings from surprise, playoff-potential teams that more fans would enjoy watching.

Under the flexible-scheduling system, all Sunday games in the affected weeks tentatively had the start times of 1:00 p.m. ET/10:00 a.m. PT, except those played in the Pacific or Mountain time zones, which will have a tentative start time of 4:05 p.m. ET/1:05 p.m. PT (or 4:15 p.m. ET/1:15 p.m. PT if it is on the doubleheader network). On the Tuesday 12 days before the games, the league moved one game to the Sunday Night Football slot, and possibly one or more 1 p.m. slotted games to the 4:05/4:15 p.m. slots. During the last week of the season, the league could reschedule games as late as six days before the contests so that all of the television networks will be able to broadcast a game that has playoff implications.

Week 10: The Chicago–New York Giants game was flexed into Sunday Night Football at 8:15 p.m. ET on NBC and the New Orleans–Pittsburgh game was flexed to 4:15 p.m. ET on Fox.

Week 11: The San Diego–Denver game was flexed into SNF and the Indianapolis–Dallas game was flexed to 4:15 p.m. ET on CBS.

Week 12:

- The Philadelphia–Indianapolis game was flexed into SNF.
- The Chicago–New England and New York Giants–Tennessee games were flexed to 4:15 p.m. ET on Fox.

Week 13:

- The Seattle–Denver game was flexed into SNF.
- The Jacksonville–Miami game was flexed to 4:05 p.m. ET on CBS.
- The Dallas–New York Giants and Tampa Bay–Pittsburgh games were flexed to 4:15 p.m. ET on Fox.

Week 14: The New Orleans–Dallas game was flexed into SNF and the Buffalo–New York Jets game was flexed to 4:15 p.m. ET on CBS.

Week 15: The Kansas City–San Diego game was flexed into SNF and the Philadelphia–New York Giants game was flexed to 4:15 p.m. ET on Fox.

Week 17:

- The Green Bay–Chicago game was flexed into NBC Sunday Night Football at 8:15 p.m. ET.
- The Buffalo–Baltimore and Miami–Indianapolis games were flexed to 4:15 p.m. ET on CBS
- The Atlanta–Philadelphia game was flexed to 4:15 p.m. ET on Fox.

=== Thanksgiving changes ===
Beginning in 2006, a primetime game on Thanksgiving night would air between two random teams other than the Detroit Lions, Dallas Cowboys, and the teams who played them earlier in the day. It aired on NFL Network until 2012, when NBC took over.

=== Other notable changes ===
Beginning in 2006, the Indianapolis Colts would begin starting games at the same local time with other teams in the Eastern Time Zone, as the State of Indiana began observing Daylight Savings Time earlier in the year.

== Regular season standings ==
=== Division ===
AFC East
| | W | L | T | PCT | DIV | CONF | PF | PA | STK |
|---|---|---|---|---|---|---|---|---|---|
| ^{(4)} New England Patriots | 12 | 4 | 0 | .750 | 4–2 | 8–4 | 385 | 237 | W3 |
| ^{(5)} New York Jets | 10 | 6 | 0 | .625 | 4–2 | 7–5 | 316 | 295 | W3 |
| Buffalo Bills | 7 | 9 | 0 | .438 | 3–3 | 5–7 | 300 | 311 | L2 |
| Miami Dolphins | 6 | 10 | 0 | .375 | 1–5 | 3–9 | 260 | 283 | L3 |

AFC North
| | W | L | T | PCT | DIV | CONF | PF | PA | STK |
|---|---|---|---|---|---|---|---|---|---|
| ^{(2)} Baltimore Ravens | 13 | 3 | 0 | .813 | 5–1 | 10–2 | 353 | 201 | W4 |
| Cincinnati Bengals | 8 | 8 | 0 | .500 | 4–2 | 6–6 | 373 | 331 | L3 |
| Pittsburgh Steelers | 8 | 8 | 0 | .500 | 3–3 | 5–7 | 353 | 315 | W1 |
| Cleveland Browns | 4 | 12 | 0 | .250 | 0–6 | 3–9 | 238 | 356 | L4 |

AFC South
| | W | L | T | PCT | DIV | CONF | PF | PA | STK |
|---|---|---|---|---|---|---|---|---|---|
| ^{(3)} Indianapolis Colts | 12 | 4 | 0 | .750 | 3–3 | 9–3 | 427 | 360 | W1 |
| Tennessee Titans | 8 | 8 | 0 | .500 | 4–2 | 5–7 | 324 | 400 | L1 |
| Jacksonville Jaguars | 8 | 8 | 0 | .500 | 2–4 | 5–7 | 371 | 274 | L3 |
| Houston Texans | 6 | 10 | 0 | .375 | 3–3 | 6–6 | 267 | 366 | W2 |

AFC West
| | W | L | T | PCT | DIV | CONF | PF | PA | STK |
|---|---|---|---|---|---|---|---|---|---|
| ^{(1)} San Diego Chargers | 14 | 2 | 0 | .875 | 5–1 | 10–2 | 492 | 303 | W10 |
| ^{(6)} Kansas City Chiefs | 9 | 7 | 0 | .563 | 4–2 | 5–7 | 331 | 315 | W2 |
| Denver Broncos | 9 | 7 | 0 | .563 | 3–3 | 8–4 | 319 | 305 | L1 |
| Oakland Raiders | 2 | 14 | 0 | .125 | 0–6 | 1–11 | 168 | 332 | L9 |

NFC East
| | W | L | T | PCT | DIV | CONF | PF | PA | STK |
|---|---|---|---|---|---|---|---|---|---|
| ^{(3)} Philadelphia Eagles | 10 | 6 | 0 | .625 | 5–1 | 9–3 | 398 | 328 | W5 |
| ^{(5)} Dallas Cowboys | 9 | 7 | 0 | .563 | 2–4 | 6–6 | 425 | 350 | L2 |
| ^{(6)} New York Giants | 8 | 8 | 0 | .500 | 4–2 | 7–5 | 355 | 362 | W1 |
| Washington Redskins | 5 | 11 | 0 | .313 | 1–5 | 3–9 | 307 | 376 | L2 |

NFC North
| | W | L | T | PCT | DIV | CONF | PF | PA | STK |
|---|---|---|---|---|---|---|---|---|---|
| ^{(1)} Chicago Bears | 13 | 3 | 0 | .813 | 5–1 | 11–1 | 427 | 255 | L1 |
| Green Bay Packers | 8 | 8 | 0 | .500 | 5–1 | 7–5 | 301 | 366 | W4 |
| Minnesota Vikings | 6 | 10 | 0 | .375 | 2–4 | 6–6 | 282 | 387 | L3 |
| Detroit Lions | 3 | 13 | 0 | .188 | 0–6 | 2–10 | 305 | 398 | W1 |

NFC South
| | W | L | T | PCT | DIV | CONF | PF | PA | STK |
|---|---|---|---|---|---|---|---|---|---|
| ^{(2)} New Orleans Saints | 10 | 6 | 0 | .625 | 4–2 | 9–3 | 413 | 322 | L1 |
| Carolina Panthers | 8 | 8 | 0 | .500 | 5–1 | 6–6 | 270 | 305 | W2 |
| Atlanta Falcons | 7 | 9 | 0 | .438 | 3–3 | 5–7 | 292 | 328 | L3 |
| Tampa Bay Buccaneers | 4 | 12 | 0 | .250 | 0–6 | 2–10 | 211 | 353 | L1 |

NFC West
| | W | L | T | PCT | DIV | CONF | PF | PA | STK |
|---|---|---|---|---|---|---|---|---|---|
| ^{(4)} Seattle Seahawks | 9 | 7 | 0 | .563 | 3–3 | 7–5 | 335 | 341 | W1 |
| St. Louis Rams | 8 | 8 | 0 | .500 | 2–4 | 6–6 | 367 | 381 | W3 |
| San Francisco 49ers | 7 | 9 | 0 | .438 | 3–3 | 5–7 | 298 | 412 | W1 |
| Arizona Cardinals | 5 | 11 | 0 | .313 | 4–2 | 5–7 | 314 | 389 | L1 |

=== Conference ===
AFC
| # | Team | Division | W | L | T | PCT | DIV | CONF | SOS | SOV | STK |
|---|---|---|---|---|---|---|---|---|---|---|---|
Division leaders
| 1 | San Diego Chargers | West | 14 | 2 | 0 | .875 | 5–1 | 10–2 | .457 | .424 | W10 |
| 2 | Baltimore Ravens | North | 13 | 3 | 0 | .813 | 5–1 | 10–2 | .461 | .447 | W4 |
| 3 (Note: Indianapolis claimed the No. 3 seed over New England based on head-to-head victory.) | Indianapolis Colts | South | 12 | 4 | 0 | .750 | 3–3 | 9–3 | .500 | .505 | W1 |
| 4 | New England Patriots | East | 12 | 4 | 0 | .750 | 4–2 | 8–4 | .496 | .469 | W3 |
Wild cards
| 5 | New York Jets | East | 10 | 6 | 0 | .625 | 4–2 | 7–5 | .469 | .400 | W3 |
| 6 (Note: Kansas City finished ahead of Denver based on division record, claiming the 6th and final playoff spot.) | Kansas City Chiefs | West | 9 | 7 | 0 | .563 | 4–2 | 5–7 | .492 | .444 | W2 |
Did not qualify for the postseason
| 7 | Denver Broncos | West | 9 | 7 | 0 | .563 | 3–3 | 8–4 | .531 | .438 | L1 |
| 8 (Note: Cincinnati finished ahead of Tennessee based on conference record. Division tie break was initially used to eliminate Pittsburgh (see below).) (Note: Cincinnati finished ahead of Pittsburgh based on division record.) | Cincinnati Bengals | North | 8 | 8 | 0 | .500 | 4–2 | 6–6 | .535 | .453 | L3 |
| 9 (Note: Tennessee finished ahead of Pittsburgh based on strength of victory. Division tie break was initially used to eliminate Jacksonville (see below).) (Note: Tennessee finished ahead of Jacksonville based on division record.) | Tennessee Titans | South | 8 | 8 | 0 | .500 | 4–2 | 5–7 | .570 | .484 | L1 |
| 10 (Note: Jacksonville finished ahead of Pittsburgh based on head-to-head victory.) | Jacksonville Jaguars | South | 8 | 8 | 0 | .500 | 2–4 | 5–7 | .531 | .555 | L3 |
| 11 | Pittsburgh Steelers | North | 8 | 8 | 0 | .500 | 3–3 | 5–7 | .496 | .414 | W1 |
| 12 | Buffalo Bills | East | 7 | 9 | 0 | .438 | 3–3 | 5–7 | .574 | .446 | L2 |
| 13 (Note: Houston finished ahead of Miami based on head-to-head victory.) | Houston Texans | South | 6 | 10 | 0 | .375 | 3–3 | 6–6 | .504 | .417 | W2 |
| 14 | Miami Dolphins | East | 6 | 10 | 0 | .375 | 1–5 | 3–9 | .543 | .531 | L3 |
| 15 | Cleveland Browns | North | 4 | 12 | 0 | .250 | 0–6 | 3–9 | .535 | .438 | L4 |
| 16 | Oakland Raiders | West | 2 | 14 | 0 | .125 | 0–6 | 1–11 | .555 | .406 | L9 |
Tiebreakers (Note: When breaking ties for three or more teams under the NFL's rules, they are first broken within divisions, then comparing only the highest ranked remaining team from each division.)

NFC
| # | Team | Division | W | L | T | PCT | DIV | CONF | SOS | SOV | STK |
|---|---|---|---|---|---|---|---|---|---|---|---|
Division leaders
| 1 | Chicago Bears | North | 13 | 3 | 0 | .813 | 5–1 | 11–1 | .430 | .404 | L1 |
| 2 (Note: New Orleans claimed the No. 2 seed over Philadelphia based on head-to-head victory.) | New Orleans Saints | South | 10 | 6 | 0 | .625 | 4–2 | 9–3 | .461 | .425 | L1 |
| 3 | Philadelphia Eagles | East | 10 | 6 | 0 | .625 | 5–1 | 9–3 | .477 | .450 | W5 |
| 4 | Seattle Seahawks | West | 9 | 7 | 0 | .563 | 3–3 | 7–5 | .453 | .382 | W1 |
Wild cards
| 5 | Dallas Cowboys | East | 9 | 7 | 0 | .563 | 2–4 | 6–6 | .457 | .438 | L2 |
| 6 (Note: NY Giants finished ahead of Green Bay based on strength of victory, claiming the 6th and final playoff spot.) (Note: NY Giants and Green Bay finish ahead of Carolina and St. Louis based on conference records.) | New York Giants | East | 8 | 8 | 0 | .500 | 4–2 | 7–5 | .520 | .422 | W1 |
Did not qualify for the postseason
| 7 | Green Bay Packers | North | 8 | 8 | 0 | .500 | 5–1 | 7–5 | .500 | .383 | W4 |
| 8 (Note: Carolina finished ahead of St. Louis based on head-to-head victory.) | Carolina Panthers | South | 8 | 8 | 0 | .500 | 5–1 | 6–6 | .473 | .469 | W2 |
| 9 | St. Louis Rams | West | 8 | 8 | 0 | .500 | 2–4 | 6–6 | .465 | .352 | W3 |
| 10 (Note: San Francisco finished ahead of Atlanta based on strength of victory.) | San Francisco 49ers | West | 7 | 9 | 0 | .438 | 3–3 | 5–7 | .500 | .411 | W1 |
| 11 | Atlanta Falcons | South | 7 | 9 | 0 | .438 | 3–3 | 5–7 | .457 | .375 | L3 |
| 12 | Minnesota Vikings | North | 6 | 10 | 0 | .375 | 2–4 | 6–6 | .488 | .344 | L3 |
| 13 (Note: Arizona finished ahead of Washington based on conference record.) | Arizona Cardinals | West | 5 | 11 | 0 | .313 | 4–2 | 5–7 | .500 | .425 | L1 |
| 14 | Washington Redskins | East | 5 | 11 | 0 | .313 | 1–5 | 3–9 | .512 | .513 | L2 |
| 15 | Tampa Bay Buccaneers | South | 4 | 12 | 0 | .250 | 0–6 | 2–10 | .535 | .422 | L1 |
| 16 | Detroit Lions | North | 3 | 13 | 0 | .188 | 0–6 | 2–10 | .523 | .479 | W1 |
Tiebreakers (Note: When breaking ties for three or more teams under the NFL's rules, they are first broken within divisions, then comparing only the highest-ranked remaining team from each division.)

== Playoffs ==
Within each conference, the four division winners and the top two non-division winners with the best overall regular season records) qualified for the playoffs. The four division winners are seeded 1–4 based on their overall won-lost-tied record, and the wild card teams are seeded 5–6. The NFL does not use a fixed bracket playoff system, and there are no restrictions regarding teams from the same division matching up in any round. In the first round, dubbed the wild-card playoffs or wild-card weekend, the third-seeded division winner hosts the sixth-seed wild card, and the fourth seed hosts the fifth. The 1 and 2 seeds from each conference received a first-round bye. In the second round, the divisional playoffs, the number 1 seed hosts the worst-surviving seed from the first round (seed 4, 5, or 6), while the number 2 seed will play the other team (seed 3, 4, or 5). The two surviving teams from each conference's divisional playoff games met in the respective AFC and NFC Conference Championship games, hosted by the higher seed. Although the Super Bowl, the championship round of the playoffs, is played at a neutral site, the designated home team is based on an annual rotation by conference.

Playoff seeds
| Seed | AFC | NFC |
|---|---|---|
| 1 | San Diego Chargers (West winner) | Chicago Bears (North winner) |
| 2 | Baltimore Ravens (North winner) | New Orleans Saints (South winner) |
| 3 | Indianapolis Colts (South winner) | Philadelphia Eagles (East winner) |
| 4 | New England Patriots (East winner) | Seattle Seahawks (West winner) |
| 5 | New York Jets (wild card) | Dallas Cowboys (wild card) |
| 6 | Kansas City Chiefs (wild card) | New York Giants (wild card) |

=== Bracket ===
Jan 7 – Gillette Stadium | Jan 14 – Qualcomm Stadium
5 | NY Jets | 16
4 | New England | 24
4 | New England | 37 | Jan 21 – RCA Dome
1 | San Diego | 21
AFC
Jan 6 – RCA Dome | 4 | New England | 34
Jan 13 – M&T Bank Stadium
3 | Indianapolis | 38
6 | Kansas City | 8 | AFC Championship
3 | Indianapolis | 15
3 | Indianapolis | 23 | Feb 4 – Dolphin Stadium
2 | Baltimore | 6
Wild-card round
Divisional round
Jan 7 – Lincoln Financial Field | A3 | Indianapolis | 29
Jan 13 – Louisiana Superdome
N1 | Chicago | 17
6 | NY Giants | 20 | Super Bowl XLI
3 | Philadelphia | 24
3 | Philadelphia | 23 | Jan 21 – Soldier Field
2 | New Orleans | 27
NFC
Jan 6 – Qwest Field | 2 | New Orleans | 14
Jan 14 – Soldier Field
1 | Chicago | 39
5 | Dallas | 20 | NFC Championship
4 | Seattle | 24
4 | Seattle | 21
1 | Chicago | 27*

* Indicates overtime victory

=== Pro Bowl ===
- 2007 Pro Bowl at Aloha Stadium, Honolulu, Hawaii: AFC 31, NFC 28

== Milestones ==
The following teams and players set all-time NFL records during the regular season:

| Record | Player/team | Date/opponent | Previous record holder |
|---|---|---|---|
| Most points scored, career | Morten Andersen, Atlanta | December 16 vs. Dallas | Gary Anderson, 1982–2004 (2,434) |
| Most field goals, career | Morten Andersen, Atlanta | December 24 vs. Carolina | Gary Anderson, 1982–2004 (538) |
| Most passes completed, career | Brett Favre, Green Bay | December 17 vs. Detroit | Dan Marino, 1983–1999 (4,967) |
| Most touchdowns, season | LaDainian Tomlinson, San Diego (31) | December 10 vs. Denver | Shaun Alexander, Seattle, 2005 (28) |
| Most rushing touchdowns, season | LaDainian Tomlinson, San Diego (28) | December 10 vs. Denver | Shaun Alexander, 2005; Priest Holmes, 2003 (27) |
| Most points scored, season | LaDainian Tomlinson, San Diego (186) | December 17 vs. Kansas City | Paul Hornung, 1960 (176) |
| Most rushing attempts, season | Larry Johnson, Kansas City (416) | December 31 vs. Jacksonville | Jamal Anderson, Atlanta, 1998 (410) |
| Most kick returns for a touchdown, season | Devin Hester, Chicago (5; 3 punts and 2 kickoffs) | December 11 at St. Louis | Tied by 9 players (4) |

== Regular season statistical leaders ==
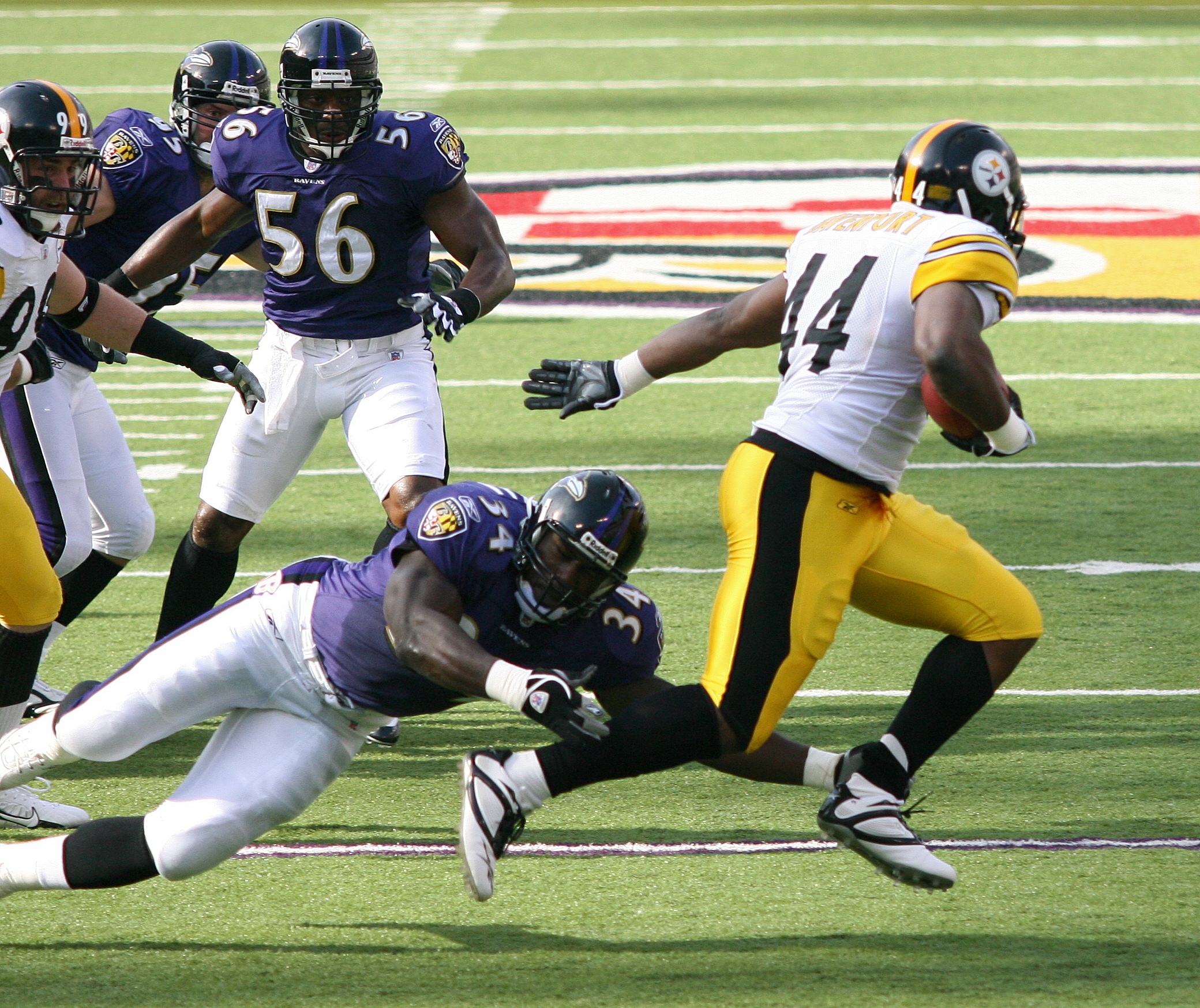
Pittsburgh Steelers running back Najeh Davenport against the Baltimore Ravens in week 12 of the 2006 season

=== Team ===
| Points scored | San Diego Chargers (492) |
| Total yards gained | New Orleans Saints (6,264) |
| Yards rushing | Atlanta Falcons (2,939) |
| Yards passing | New Orleans Saints (4,503) |
| Fewest points allowed | Baltimore Ravens (201) |
| Fewest total yards allowed | Baltimore Ravens (4,225) |
| Fewest rushing yards allowed | Minnesota Vikings (985) |
| Fewest passing yards allowed | Oakland Raiders (2,413) |

=== Individual ===
| Scoring | LaDainian Tomlinson, San Diego (186 points) |
| Touchdowns | LaDainian Tomlinson, San Diego (31 TDs) |
| Most field goals made | Robbie Gould, Chicago and Jeff Wilkins, St. Louis (32 FGs) |
| Rushing | LaDainian Tomlinson, San Diego (1,815 yards) |
| Passer rating | Peyton Manning, Indianapolis (101.0 rating) |
| Passing touchdowns | Peyton Manning, Indianapolis (31 TDs) |
| Passing yards | Drew Brees, New Orleans (4,418 yards) |
| Pass receptions | Andre Johnson, Houston (103 catches) |
| Pass receiving yards | Chad Johnson, Cincinnati (1,369 yards) |
| Punt returns | Adam "Pacman" Jones, Tennessee (12.9 average yards) |
| Kickoff returns | Justin Miller, New York Jets (28.3 average yards) |
| Interceptions | Asante Samuel, New England and Champ Bailey, Denver (10) |
| Punting | Mat McBriar, Dallas (48.2 average yards) |
| Sacks | Shawne Merriman, San Diego (17) |

== Awards ==
| Most Valuable Player | LaDainian Tomlinson, running back, San Diego Chargers |
| Coach of the Year | Sean Payton, New Orleans Saints |
| Offensive Player of the Year | LaDainian Tomlinson, running back, San Diego Chargers |
| Defensive Player of the Year | Jason Taylor, defensive end, Miami Dolphins |
| Offensive Rookie of the Year | Vince Young, quarterback, Tennessee Titans |
| Defensive Rookie of the Year | DeMeco Ryans, linebacker, Houston Texans |
| NFL Comeback Player of the Year | Chad Pennington, quarterback, New York Jets |
| Walter Payton NFL Man of the Year | LaDainian Tomlinson, running back, San Diego Chargers and | Drew Brees, quarterback, New Orleans Saints |
| Super Bowl Most Valuable Player | Peyton Manning, quarterback, Indianapolis Colts |

All-Pro Team

Offense
| Quarterback | Drew Brees, New Orleans |
| Running back | LaDainian Tomlinson, San Diego; Larry Johnson, Kansas City |
| Fullback | Lorenzo Neal, San Diego |
| Wide receiver | Marvin Harrison, Indianapolis; Chad Johnson, Cincinnati |
| Tight end | Antonio Gates, San Diego |
| Offensive tackle | Willie Anderson, Cincinnati; Jammal Brown, New Orleans |
| Offensive guard | Alan Faneca, Pittsburgh; Shawn Andrews, Philadelphia |
| Center | Olin Kreutz, Chicago |

Defense
| Defensive end | Jason Taylor, Miami; Julius Peppers, Carolina |
| Defensive tackle | Jamal Williams, San Diego; Kevin Williams, Minnesota |
| Outside linebacker | Shawne Merriman, San Diego; Adalius Thomas, Baltimore |
| Inside linebacker | Brian Urlacher, Chicago; Zach Thomas, Miami |
| Cornerback | Champ Bailey, Denver; Rashean Mathis, Jacksonville |
| Safety | Brian Dawkins, Philadelphia; Ed Reed, Baltimore |

Special teams
| Kicker | Robbie Gould, Chicago |
| Punter | Brian Moorman, Buffalo |
| Kick returner | Devin Hester, Chicago |

=== Team superlatives ===
==== Offense ====
- Most points scored: San Diego, 492
- Fewest points scored: Oakland, 168
- Most total offensive yards: New Orleans, 6,264
- Fewest total offensive yards: Oakland, 3,939
- Most total passing yards: New Orleans, 4,503
- Fewest total passing yards: Atlanta, 2,371
- Most rushing yards: Atlanta, 2,939
- Fewest rushing yards: Detroit, 1,129

==== Defense ====
- Fewest points allowed: Baltimore, 201
- Most points allowed: San Francisco, 412
- Fewest total yards allowed: Baltimore, 4,225
- Most total yards allowed: Tennessee, 5,915
- Fewest passing yards allowed: Oakland, 2,413
- Most passing yards allowed: Cincinnati / Minnesota (tie), 3,818
- Fewest rushing yards allowed: Minnesota, 985
- Most rushing yards allowed: Indianapolis, 2,768

== Head coach/front office changes ==
Head coach

| Team | Departing coach | Interim coach | Reason for leaving | Incoming coach | Notes |
|---|---|---|---|---|---|
| Buffalo Bills | Mike Mularkey | | Resigned | Dick Jauron | On January 12, 2006, Mularkey resigned as head coach of the Bills, citing a disagreement in the direction of the organization, who had recently hired new management, including ex-coach Marv Levy. After a strenuous interview process, Levy hired Jauron, former Detroit Lions interim head coach, as his replacement. |
| Detroit Lions | Steve Mariucci | Dick Jauron | Fired | Rod Marinelli | Mariucci was fired after a 27–7 blowout loss on national television on Thanksgiving Day. Marinelli had been the Tampa Bay Buccaneers defensive line coach for the past six seasons and assistant head coach for the past four. |
| Green Bay Packers | Mike Sherman | | Fired | Mike McCarthy | Sherman was fired by the Packers on January 2, 2006, after leading the Packers to a 4–12 record in 2005. The team immediately started interviewing for a replacement. McCarthy was interviewed by Packers general manager Ted Thompson on January 8, 2006, and was offered the head coaching position three days later. |
| Houston Texans | Dom Capers | | Fired | Gary Kubiak | Kubiak, the Denver Broncos offensive coordinator, was named the second head coach in Texans history on January 26, 2006. |
| Kansas City Chiefs | Dick Vermeil | | Retired | Herm Edwards | Edwards was acquired from the New York Jets for a fourth-round draft pick. See also: Herm Edwards § Departure from New York |
| Minnesota Vikings | Mike Tice | | Fired | Brad Childress | Tice's contract was allowed to expire after the last game of the 2005 season on January 1, 2006. Childress was the Philadelphia Eagles offensive coordinator from 2002–2005, although he never called plays for the Eagles, as that responsibility was taken by head coach Andy Reid. |
| New Orleans Saints | Jim Haslett | | Fired | Sean Payton | Payton was the assistant head coach and passing game coordinator for the Dallas Cowboys. |
| New York Jets | Herm Edwards | | Traded | Eric Mangini | Mangini, 35, became the youngest head coach in the NFL when he was hired by the New York Jets on January 17, 2006, to replace Herm Edwards. |
| Oakland Raiders | Norv Turner | | Fired | Art Shell | Shell, who had been working as the senior vice president of football operations and development for the league, had not been a head coach since the Raiders fired him after the 1994 season. |
| St. Louis Rams | Mike Martz | Joe Vitt | Fired | Scott Linehan | On October 10, 2005, Martz took a leave of absence from the Rams to treat a persistent bacterial infection in his heart. This led to assistant head coach Joe Vitt becoming the interim coach for the rest of the season. Martz was given medical clearance to coach the Rams' last regular season game, on New Year's Day 2006; however, team management refused to let him do so, and Martz was fired the day after the season's conclusion. |

Front office

| Team | 2005 office holder | Reason for leaving | 2006 replacement | | Notes |
|---|---|---|---|---|---|
| Buffalo Bills | Tom Donahoe | Fired | Marv Levy | | On January 5, 2006, Bills owner Ralph Wilson enlisted Levy, at the age of 80, to act as general manager and vice president of football operations for the Buffalo Bills. |
| Houston Texans | Charley Casserly | Resigned | Rick Smith | | Charley Casserly left the organization following the 2006 NFL draft. Smith was the director of pro personnel for the Denver Broncos. |
| Minnesota Vikings | Rob Brzezinski | Front office overhaul | Fran Foley | Rick Spielman | Fran Foley had been hired as vice president of player personnel and de facto general manager on January 26, 2006. Foley was fired on May 3rd, 2006, just three months into his tenure and mere days following the 2006 NFL draft. Rick Spielman was hired in the same role on May 30, 2006. Spielman is part of the "Triangle of Authority" with Vikings' owner Zygi Wilf and head coach Brad Childress working together to make decisions. |
| New York Jets | Terry Bradway | Resigned | Mike Tannenbaum | | Tannenbaum was previously the team's assistant general manager & director of pro personnel. |
| Philadelphia Eagles | Andy Reid (de facto GM) | Replaced | Tom Heckert Jr. | | Heckert was promoted from vice president of pro personnel to general manager. Despite Heckert's new title, head coach Andy Reid still serves as executive vice president of football operations and has the final say in football matters. |
| St. Louis Rams | Charley Armey | Retired | Jay Zygmunt | | Zygmunt also retains his position of President of Football Operations. |

== Stadium changes ==
- Arizona Cardinals: The Cardinals moved from Sun Devil Stadium in Tempe to University of Phoenix Stadium in Glendale, with the University of Phoenix acquiring the naming rights
- Miami Dolphins: Dolphins Stadium was renamed to the singular Dolphin Stadium
- The New Orleans Saints returned to their home at the Louisiana Superdome in Week Three. Due to damage by Hurricane Katrina, the Saints' first 2005 home game against the New York Giants was moved to Giants Stadium. The Saints then played their remaining 2005 home schedule at Baton Rouge's Tiger Stadium for four games and at San Antonio's Alamodome for three games.
- Tennessee Titans: The Coliseum was renamed LP Field after the manufacturing company Louisiana-Pacific (LP) acquired the naming rights

== Uniform changes ==
- The Minnesota Vikings added trim lines to the outside shoulders and sleeves, and the jersey sides and pants. The horn on the helmet was also modified to be slightly more defined. Purple pants were also worn at selected games.
- The New Orleans Saints began wearing black pants at selected games.

== Ticket sellouts ==
Through week 11 of the season, all NFL games had been sold out, and for the 24th time, all blackout restrictions had been lifted. The streak was ended by the Jacksonville at Buffalo game in Week 12.

== Television ==
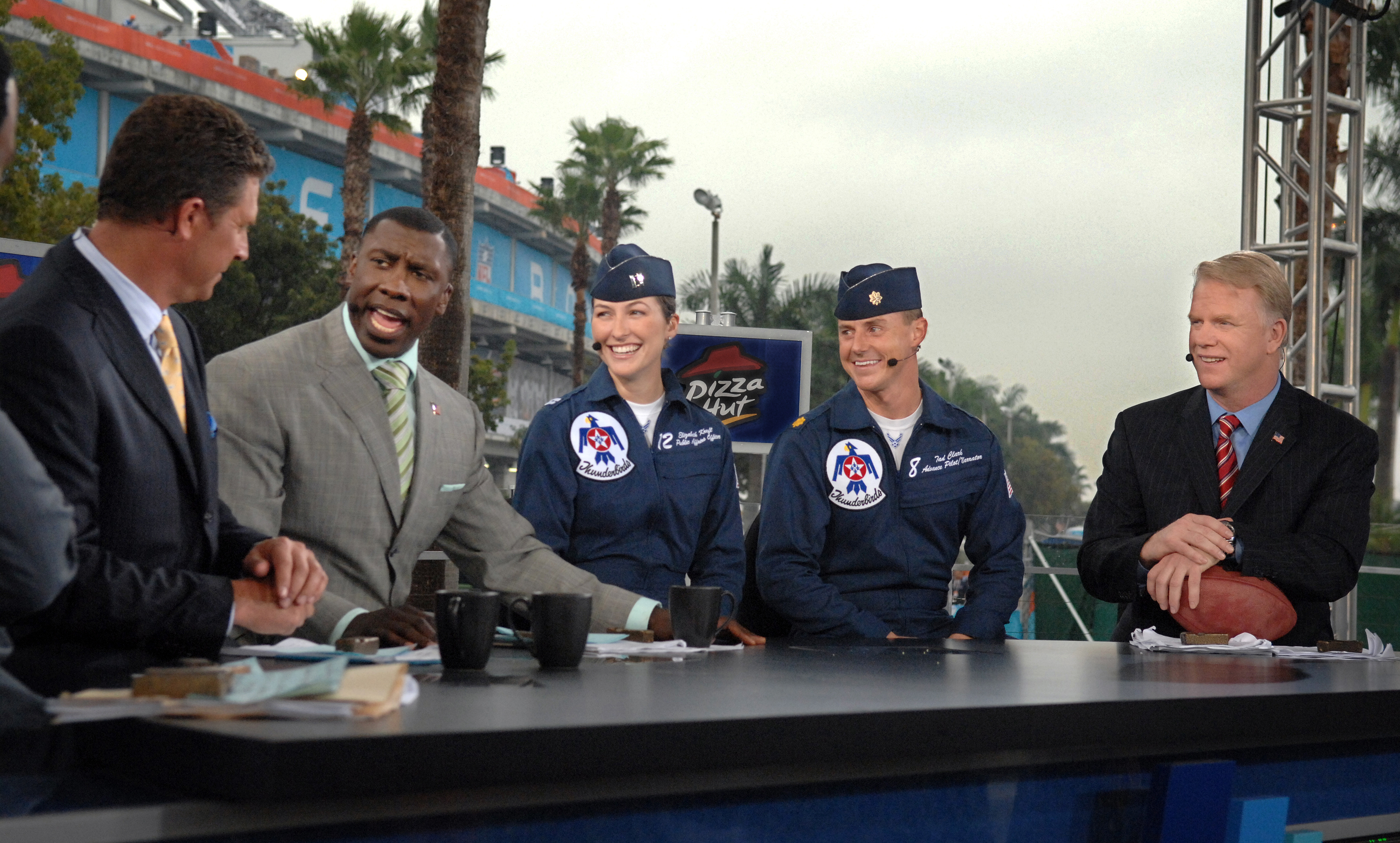
CBS's The NFL Today, Super Bowl XLI

This was the first season that NBC held the rights to televise Sunday Night Football, becoming the beneficiaries by negotiating the new flexible-scheduling system (it also marked NBC's return to carrying NFL games for the first time since the end of the 1997 season). ESPN became the new home of Monday Night Football. Disney-owned corporate sibling ABC had lost millions of dollars on televising MNF during the late 1990s and 2000s despite generating high ratings, and with the NFL wanting Sunday night to be the new night for its marquee game, ABC preferred to protect its Desperate Housewives franchise rather than move the comedy-drama show to another night. By September 2006, ABC began using the ESPN on ABC brand after ABC Sports was fully integrated into ESPN (ABC would not air NFL games again, whether exclusive or a simulcast from ESPN, until they began simulcasting a Wild Card playoff game in 2016, and began simulcasting select MNF games in 2020). Meanwhile, CBS and Fox renewed their television contracts to the AFC and the NFC packages, respectively. ESPN's new deal was for eight seasons through 2013, while the new agreements with NBC, CBS, and Fox were initially for six seasons through 2011.

Initially, NBC was able to hire color commentator John Madden, MNF lead producer Fred Gaudelli, and MNF director Drew Esocoff from ABC. However, play-by-play announcer Al Michaels remained under contract with ABC/ESPN, and plans were originally for him to be teamed with Joe Theismann, who would be coming over from ESPN Sunday Night Football. In February 2006, the two networks' parent companies, The Walt Disney Company and NBC Universal, agreed to a multi-asset trade that, among others, allowed Michaels to sign with NBC, while Disney took ownership of the intellectual property of Oswald the Lucky Rabbit (a cartoon character developed by Walt Disney himself in the 1920s) from NBC Universal. ESPN then opted to go with Mike Tirico on play-by-play, and Theismann and Tony Kornheiser as analysts.

For its new pregame show Football Night in America, NBC gained the exclusive rights from ESPN's NFL Primetime to show extensive highlights of Sunday afternoon games prior to Sunday Night Football. ESPN responded by moving its show to Mondays. Bob Costas became the host of Football Night in America, while Cris Collinsworth, Jerome Bettis, and Sterling Sharpe became its studio analysts.

The league-owned NFL Network was given an eight-game package, consisting of five Thursday Night Football games and three Saturday game that began airing from Thanksgiving to the end of the regular season. The NFL Network hired HBO Sports' Bryant Gumbel as play-by-play announcer, NBC's Collinsworth as the color commentator for the Thursday telecasts, and Dick Vermeil replacing Collinsworth for Saturday telecasts.

James Brown moved from Fox to CBS, replacing Greg Gumbel as host of The NFL Today. Gumbel then replaced Dick Enberg as CBS's #2 play-by-play announcer, and Enberg was demoted to #3.

Fox announced that Joe Buck would replace Brown as lead host on Fox NFL Sunday. Because Buck was already serving as Fox's lead play-by-play announcer, the pregame show was primarily broadcast from the site where Buck was calling the game, and Curt Menefee hosted the halftime and postgame segments. Menefee substituted for Buck as the full-time host when Buck was calling the Major League Baseball playoffs, and the World Series.

Beginning this season and continuing until 2013; CBS would not use sideline reporters for regular season coverage after Armen Keteyian joined CBS News as an investigative correspondent and Bonnie Bernstein returned to ESPN as well as letting go of several others.
