= Jay Zygmunt =

American football executive

Personal information
- Born: July 1952 (age 74); Chicago, Illinois, U.S.

Career history
- Los Angeles/St. Louis Rams (1982–2008); General counsel (1982–1987); Vice president (1988–1990); Senior vice president (1991–1995); Executive vice president (1996–2003); President of Football Operations (2000–2005); General manager/President of Football Operations (2006–2008)

Awards and highlights
- Super Bowl champion (XXXIV)
- Executive profile at Pro Football Reference

Jay A. Zygmunt (born July 1952) is an American former professional football executive. He served as the general manager of the St. Louis Rams from 2006 to 2008, in addition to various other roles between 1982 and 2005.

A native of Chicago, Illinois, Zygmunt was hired by the Los Angeles Rams in 1982 as a general counsel. He was promoted to vice president in 1988, senior vice president in 1991, and executive vice president in 1996. After the Rams moved to St. Louis in 1995, his main role was negotiating contracts and managing salary cap.

In 1999, Zygmunt was given a game ball by coach Dick Vermeil. Vermeil said in an interview, "You know who's got the lousiest job in this building? Jay Zygmunt. I could not do what Jay Zygmunt does, and deal with the agents, and all that kind of stuff. It is tough, much tougher today than it's ever been ... He's had some good opportunities to leave here. He's been here through all these bad years. But he's been here when the Rams were winning. And he wants to see it that way again. You've got to acknowledge and pay respect to people that have that deep commitment. And his commitment is every bit as deep as mine."

After the Rams' Super Bowl XXXIV championship, Zygmunt was promoted to President of Football Operations. In 2006, he became their general manager, succeeding Charley Armey, while retaining his position of President of Football Operations. Though the team compiled an 8–8 record that year, the Rams declined in the following seasons, winning just five of thirty-two games in the next two years. He resigned following a 2–14 record in 2008.
