= Charley Armey =

American football player, coach, scout, and executive (born 1939)

Biographical details
- Born: July 16, 1939 (age 87)

Playing career
- c. 1965: Valley City State

Coaching career (HC unless noted)
- c. 1966: Graceville HS (MN)
- c. 1967: BreckenridgeHS (MN)
- 1968: North Dakota State (assistant)
- 1969: Montana Tech
- 1970–1972: Montana (assistant)
- 1973–1978: Colorado State (assistant)
- 1983: Denver Gold (assistant / interim HC)

Administrative career (AD unless noted)
- 1978: Buffalo Bills (scout)
- 1985–1987: Green Bay Packers (scout)
- 1987–1991: Atlanta Falcons (scout)
- 1991–1997: New England Patriots (scout)
- 1997–2000: St. Louis Rams (scout)
- 2000–2005: St. Louis Rams (GM)

Head coaching record
- Overall: 4–3–1 (college); 0–1 (USFL)

Charley Armey (born July 16, 1939) is an American former football coach, scout, and executive. He was an assistant and then interim head coach for the Denver Gold of the United States Football League (USFL) in 1983. He was a scout for the Green Bay Packers (1985–1987), Atlanta Falcons (1987–1991), and New England Patriots (1991–1997). He was the general manager of the St. Louis Rams 2000 to 2005 after being a scout for the Rams.

Armey served in their scouting department with college and pro personnel operations. He worked in tandem with head coach Dick Vermeil for multiple drafts. In the 1999 draft, it was Armey and company that elected to draft Torry Holt with the sixth pick over the belief that they would draft cornerbacks such as Champ Bailey or Chris McAlister. When Vermeil retired after the team's victory in Super Bowl XXXIV, Armey was promoted to GM while Jay Zygmunt was promoted to president of operations to go with Mike Martz being promoted to head coach. In the first draft for the team with Armey as GM in 2000, the team used a first-round draft pick of running back Trung Canidate despite having Marshall Faulk in the backfield (Canidate played sparingly in just three years with the team).

The 2005 season ended in acrimony for the team, with Amey having arguments with Martz and Jay Zygmunt over control. By the end of the year, Martz had a medical leave of absence and was promptly prevented from calling plays by phone and then was fired. The acrimony between Martz and Armey was pronounced enough that during an interview about Martz and his qualifications for an open Bears job, Armey stated that Martz was a "terrible" coach that could ruin their quarterback. By 2008, Armey was shuttled out of being a chief evaluator of talent in favor of Billy Devaney.

His brother is Dick Armey.

== Head coaching record ==
=== College ===
Year	Team	Overall	Conference	Standing	Bowl/playoffs
Montana Tech Orediggers (Frontier Conference) (1969)
1969	Montana Tech	4–3–1	2–2–1	3rd	
Montana Tech:		4–3–1	2–2–1		
Total:		4–3–1			
