= 2010 Tampa Bay Buccaneers season =

NFL team season

- Owner: Malcolm Glazer
- General manager: Mark Dominik
- Head coach: Raheem Morris
- Home stadium: Raymond James Stadium

Results
- Record: 10–6
- Division place: 3rd NFC South
- Playoffs: Did not qualify
- Pro Bowlers: LT Donald Penn

Uniform
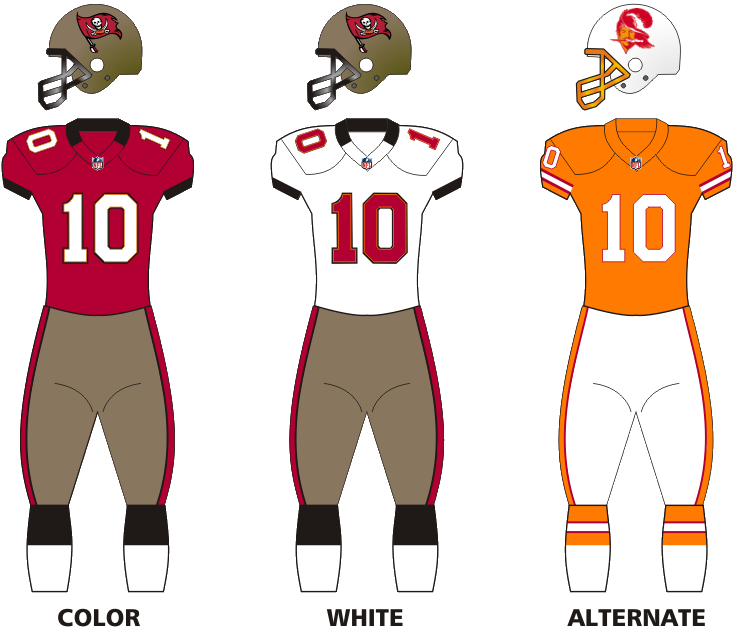

The 2010 season was the Tampa Bay Buccaneers' 35th in the National Football League (NFL) and their second under head coach Raheem Morris. The Buccaneers entered the season attempting to improve on their 3–13 record and last place finish in the NFC South in 2009, a feat they accomplished after only six games. The Buccaneers achieved the best turnaround in franchise history and became the first team since the NFL merger in 1970 to start 10 rookies and achieve a winning season. Raheem Morris spent his second season as head coach. The Buccaneers had the third overall pick in the 2010 NFL draft, with which they selected Gerald McCoy.

John McKay, the team's first head coach, became the second inductee into the Ring of Honor on December 5 during a game against Atlanta. McKay's son Rich, a former Buccaneers general manager, and current president of the Falcons, accepted the award for his late father. The Buccaneers wore throwback uniforms for the Falcons game.

Despite finishing the season with a 10–6 record (a seven-game improvement from the year before), the team failed to sell out any of its home games at Raymond James Stadium, and narrowly missed the playoffs. It is the second NFL stadium that failed to sell out any of the team's home games; the first stadium was Sun Devil Stadium back in 2005. This was the team's last winning season until the 2016 season.

== Offseason ==
=== Personnel changes ===
- Alex Van Pelt joined the team as quarterbacks coach, taking the role over from Greg Olson so that he could concentrate on the offensive coordinator role.
- Eric Yarber joined the team as wide receivers coach, taking the role over from Richard Mann who left the team.
- Robert Nunn left the team leaving Todd Wash with the sole responsibility for the defensive line.
- Joe Baker moved from defensive backs coach to linebackers, taking the role over from Joe Barry who left the team.
- Jimmy Lake became defensive backs coach.
- Tim Holt joined the team as an offensive assistant coach.
- Chris Mosley became a defensive assistant coach, moving from the position of assistant offensive line coach.

=== Roster changes ===
==== Free agents ====
- Brian Clark WR – UFA – Signed with Detroit Lions in free agency
- Antonio Bryant WR – UFA – Signed with Cincinnati Bengals in free agency
- Matt McCoy OLB – UFA – Signed with Seattle Seahawks in free agency
- Will Allen FS – UFA – Signed with Pittsburgh Steelers in free agency
- Angelo Crowell OLB – UFA – Re-signed with Buccaneers
- Jermaine Phillips SS – UFA
- Jimmy Wilkerson DE – UFA – Signed with New Orleans Saints in free agency
- Donald Penn OT – RFA – Tendered 1st and 3rd – Resigned on first morning of training camp to 5-year deal.
- Barrett Ruud ILB – RFA – Tendered 1st and 3rd – Re-signed with Buccaneers
- Carnell Williams RB – RFA – Tendered 1st – Re-signed with Buccaneers
- Jeremy Trueblood OT – RFA – Tendered 2nd – Re-signed with Buccaneers
- Mark Bradley WR – RFA – Tendered 2nd – Re-signed with Buccaneers
- Maurice Stovall WR – RFA – Tendered 3rd – Re-signed with Buccaneers
- Rod Wilson OLB – Untendered RFA – Signed with the Jacksonville Jaguars on 17 August
- Byron Storer FB – Untendered RFA – Taken place on Buccaneers coaching staff as assistant special teams coach, forced to retire due to injuries
- Clifton Smith RB – ERFA – Re-signed with Buccaneers
- Elbert Mack CB – ERFA – Re-signed with Buccaneers

==== Releases ====
- Clifton Smith RB
- Derrick Ward RB
- B. J. Askew FB
- Mark Bradley WR
- Reggie Brown WR
- Michael Clayton WR
- Terrence Nunn WR
- Mario Urrutia WR
- Martin Rucker TE – Failed physical, released day after he signed
- Marc Dile OT

- Xavier Fulton OT
- Shawn Murphy G
- Arron Sears G
- Donovan Raiola C
- Chris Hovan DT
- Dre Moore DT
- Maurice Evans DE
- Carlton Powell DE
- Angelo Crowell OLB
- Lee Robinson OLB

- Brandon Anderson CB
- Torrie Cox CB
- Derrick Roberson CB
- Trae Williams CB
- Stoney Woodson CB
- Emanuel Cook SS
- De'von Hall FS
- Josh Bidwell P
- Dirk Johnson P
- Sam Paulescu P

==== Signings ====
- Sean Jones SS
- Jon Alston OLB
- Keydrick Vincent G

- Kregg Lumpkin RB
- Ted Larsen C/G
- Carlton Powell DE

- Donovan Raiola C
- Martin Rucker TE
- Trae Williams CB

==== Trades ====
- Reggie Brown WR – Traded from the Philadelphia Eagles for a 6th round pick in 2011 draft

==== Cut during season ====
- Jerramy Stevens TE – Cut on October 25 after he was arrested for possession of cannabis with intent to sell.
- Keydrick Vincent
- Sabby Piscitelli
- Ryan Sims
- Chris Pressley

=== 2010 draft class ===
After finishing the 2009 season with a record of 3–13, the Buccaneers picked third. The Buccaneers also had an additional second round pick from a trade that sent the late defensive end Gaines Adams to the Chicago Bears, a fifth round pick from the New England Patriots in a trade that sent tight end Alex Smith to the Patriots, and two additional seventh round picks; one from the Jacksonville Jaguars for quarterback Luke McCown, and one from the Baltimore Ravens for defensive end Marques Douglas. The Buccaneers traded their 2010 fifth-round selection and a 2009 second-round selection to the Browns for TE Kellen Winslow II.

Tampa Bay Buccaneers 2010 NFL Draft selections
Draft order			Player name	Position	Height	Weight	College	Contract	Notes
Round	Choice	Overall	Player name	Position	Height	Weight	College	Contract	Notes
1	3	3	Gerald McCoy	Defensive tackle	6 ft 4 1/8 in (1.934 m)	295 lb (134 kg)	Oklahoma		
2	3	35	Brian Price	Defensive tackle	6 ft 1 in (1.85 m)	303 lb (137 kg)	UCLA		
2	7	39	Arrelious Benn	Wide receiver	6 ft 1 in (1.85 m)	219 lb (99 kg)	Illinois		From Oakland Raiders
2	10	42	Traded to Oakland along with the 134rd pick for the 39th pick. Originally acquired from the Chicago Bears						
3	3	67	Myron Lewis	Cornerback	6 ft 2 in (1.88 m)	203 lb (92 kg)	Vanderbilt		
4	3	101	Mike Williams	Wide receiver	6 ft 2 in (1.88 m)	221 lb (100 kg)	Syracuse		
5	3	134	Traded to the Cleveland Browns along with a 2009 2nd round pick for Kellen Winslow II						
5	22	153	Traded to Oakland along with the 42nd pick for the 39th pick. Originally from the New England Patriots						
6	3	172	Brent Bowden	Punter	6 ft 3 in (1.91 m)	206 lb (93 kg)	Virginia Tech		
7	3	210	Cody Grimm	Safety	6 ft 1 in (1.85 m)	203 lb (92 kg)	Virginia Tech		
7	10	217	Dekoda Watson	Linebacker	6 ft 1 in (1.85 m)	226 lb (103 kg)	Florida State		From Jacksonville Jaguars for Luke McCown
7	18	225	Traded to the Denver Broncos their 2011 5th round pick.						
7	25	232	Traded to the Denver Broncos their 2011 5th round pick.						
7	46	253	Erik Lorig	Defensive end	6 ft 3 in (1.91 m)	281 lb (127 kg)	Stanford		

==== Undrafted free agents ====
After the draft many of the players that went unpicked are signed by teams to fill out their rosters and create competition for places on the roster. These undrafted free agents have a long shot of making the team for the start of the regular season but there have been some notable recent Buccaneer success stories such as Clifton Smith and Elbert Mack. The following were signed after the draft as first year players.

- Jevan Snead QB – Released
- Carlos Brown RB – Released
- LeGarrette Blount RB – Claimed off waivers after roster cuts, on 53 man roster
- Rendrick Taylor FB – Released
- Damola adeniji wr – Released
- Shawn moore wr – Released
- Dezmon Briscoe WR – Practice squad
- Chris Brooks WR – Released
- Preston Parker WR – Made initial 53 man roster
- Jeron Mastrud TE – Released
- Will Barker OT – Practice Squad
- Derek Hardman OT – Practice Squad
- Rob okeafor ot – Released
- James williams ot – Released
- Lee grimes og – Released
- Sergio Render OG – Released
- Vladimir Richard OG – Released
- Michael shumard og – Released
- Jeff Tow-Arnett C – Released
- Matt featherston de – Released
- Brandon gilbeaux de – Placed on Injury Reserve
- George Johnson DE – Practice Squad
- James Ruffin DE – Released
- Rico McCoy OLB – Released
- Darrell pasco cb – Released
- Dennis rogan fs – Released
- Matt O'Hanlon SS – Waived due to injury
- Vince Anderson SS – Released
- Hunter Lawrence K – Released
- Chris Bryan P – Claimed off waivers after roster cuts, on 53 man roster
- Chris mauriello ls – Released

== Staff ==
2010 Tampa Bay Buccaneers staff
Front office: Owner/President – Malcolm Glazer; Co-Chairman – Bryan Glazer; Co-Chairman – Edward Glazer; Co-Chairman – Joel Glazer; General manager – Mark Dominik; Director of college scouting – Dennis Hickey; Director of football administration – Digger Daley; Head coaches: Head coach – Raheem Morris; Associate head coach/special teams coordinator – Richard Bisaccia; Assistant to the head coach – Jay Kaiser; Offensive coaches: Offensive coordinator – Greg Olson; Quarterbacks – Alex Van Pelt; Running backs – Steve Logan; Wide receivers – Eric Yarber; Assistant wide receivers – Tim Berbenich; Tight ends – Alfredo Roberts; Offensive line – Pete Mangurian; Assistant offensive line – Tim Holt	Defensive coaches: Defensive line – Todd Wash; Assistant defensive line – Chris Mosley; Linebackers – Joe Baker; Defensive backs – Jimmy Lake; Assistant defensive backs – Dwayne Stukes; Special teams coaches: Assistant special teams – Byron Storer; Strength and conditioning: Head strength and conditioning – Kurt Shultz; Assistant strength and conditioning – Chris Meenan

== Final roster ==
2010 Tampa Bay Buccaneers roster
Quarterbacks (QB): 12 Rudy Carpenter; 5 Josh Freeman; 11 Josh Johnson; Running backs (RB): 27 LeGarrette Blount; 34 Earnest Graham FB; 44 Erik Lorig FB; 28 Kregg Lumpkin; 24 Cadillac Williams; Wide receivers (WR): 89 Dezmon Briscoe; 87 Preston Parker; 81 Micheal Spurlock; 85 Maurice Stovall; 18 Sammie Stroughter; 19 Mike Williams; Tight ends (TE): 88 John Gilmore; 84 Nathan Overbay; 80 Ryan Purvis; 82 Kellen Winslow II	Offensive linemen (OL): 61 Will Barker T; 60 Brandon Carter G; 73 Derek Hardman G; 62 Ted Larsen G; 77 James Lee T; 70 Donald Penn T; 65 Jeremy Trueblood T; 76 Jeremy Zuttah C; Defensive linemen (DL): 71 Michael Bennett DE; 96 Tim Crowder DE; 67 George Johnson DE; 97 Alex Magee DE; 90 Roy Miller DT; 98 Frank Okam DT; 91 Stylez G. White DE; 95 Al Woods DT; 79 Doug Worthington DE	Linebackers (LB): 54 Geno Hayes OLB; 57 Adam Hayward OLB; 53 Niko Koutouvides MLB; 50 Tyrone McKenzie OLB; 51 Barrett Ruud MLB; 56 Dekoda Watson OLB; Defensive backs (DB): 22 Larry Asante SS; 20 Ronde Barber CB; 31 E. J. Biggers CB; 21 Dominique Harris FS; 29 D. J. Johnson CB; 26 Sean Jones SS; 23 Myron Lewis CB; 41 Corey Lynch FS; 33 Elbert Mack CB; Special teams (ST): 10 Connor Barth K; 48 Andrew Economos LS; 1 Robert Malone P	Practice squad: 37 Vince Anderson S; 68 Marc Dile T; 49 J. D. Folsom LB; 15 Ed Gant WR; 47 Simoni Lawrence LB; 74 John Malecki G; 30 Rendrick Taylor FB; 78 E. J. Wilson DE; Reserve: -- Jon Alston OLB (IR); 17 Arrelious Benn WR (IR); 58 Quincy Black OLB (IR); 69 Demar Dotson T (IR); 52 Jeff Faine C (IR); 72 Brandon Gilbeaux DE (IR); 35 Cody Grimm FS (IR); 32 Kareem Huggins RB (IR); 36 Tanard Jackson FS (Susp.); 75 Davin Joseph G (IR); 93 Gerald McCoy DT (IR); 94 Kyle Moore DE (IR); 92 Brian Price DT (IR); 25 Aqib Talib CB (IR); Rookies in italics 53 active, 14 reserve, 8 practice squad

== Schedule ==
=== Preseason ===
The Buccaneers preseason schedule was announced on March 31, 2010.

Week	Date	Opponent	Result	Record	Venue	Recap
1	August 14	at Miami Dolphins	L 7–10	0–1	Sun Life Stadium	Recap
2	August 21	Kansas City Chiefs	W 20–15	1–1	Raymond James Stadium	Recap
3	August 28	Jacksonville Jaguars	L 13–19	1–2	Raymond James Stadium	Recap
4	September 2	at Houston Texans	W 24–17	2–2	Reliant Stadium	Recap

=== Regular season ===
The Buccaneers' schedule was announced on April 20, 2010.

Week	Date	Opponent	Result	Record	Venue	Recap
1	September 12	Cleveland Browns	W 17–14	1–0	Raymond James Stadium	Recap
2	September 19	at Carolina Panthers	W 20–7	2–0	Bank of America Stadium	Recap
3	September 26	Pittsburgh Steelers	L 13–38	2–1	Raymond James Stadium	Recap
4	Bye					
5	October 10	at Cincinnati Bengals	W 24–21	3–1	Paul Brown Stadium	Recap
6	October 17	New Orleans Saints	L 6–31	3–2	Raymond James Stadium	Recap
7	October 24	St. Louis Rams	W 18–17	4–2	Raymond James Stadium	Recap
8	October 31	at Arizona Cardinals	W 38–35	5–2	University of Phoenix Stadium	Recap
9	November 7	at Atlanta Falcons	L 21–27	5–3	Georgia Dome	Recap
10	November 14	Carolina Panthers	W 31–16	6–3	Raymond James Stadium	Recap
11	November 21	at San Francisco 49ers	W 21–0	7–3	Candlestick Park	Recap
12	November 28	at Baltimore Ravens	L 10–17	7–4	M&T Bank Stadium	Recap
13	December 5	Atlanta Falcons	L 24–28	7–5	Raymond James Stadium	Recap
14	December 12	at Washington Redskins	W 17–16	8–5	FedExField	Recap
15	December 19	Detroit Lions	L 20–23 (OT)	8–6	Raymond James Stadium	Recap
16	December 26	Seattle Seahawks	W 38–15	9–6	Raymond James Stadium	Recap
17	January 2	at New Orleans Saints	W 23–13	10–6	Louisiana Superdome	Recap

== Standings ==
NFC South
	W	L	T	PCT	DIV	CONF	PF	PA	STK
^{(1)} Atlanta Falcons	13	3	0	.813	5–1	10–2	414	288	W1
^{(5)} New Orleans Saints	11	5	0	.688	4–2	9–3	384	307	L1
Tampa Bay Buccaneers	10	6	0	.625	3–3	8–4	343	318	W2
Carolina Panthers	2	14	0	.125	0–6	2–10	196	408	L2

== Game summaries ==
=== Week 1: vs. Cleveland Browns ===
Week 1: Cleveland Browns vs Tampa Bay Buccaneers – Game summary

Quarter	1	2	3	4	Total
Browns	7	7	0	0	14
Buccaneers	3	7	0	7	17

at Raymond James Stadium, Tampa, Florida

- Date: September 12
- Game time: 1:00 p.m. EDT
- Game weather: 87 °F (31 °C) (Partly Cloudy)
- Game attendance: 47,211
- Referee: Jeff Triplette
- TV announcers (CBS): Spero Dedes and Rich Gannon (blacked out locally)
- Recap

Game information

First quarter

- CLE – (2:57) Mohamed Massaquoi 41-yard pass from Jake Delhomme (Phil Dawson kick), Browns 7–0, Drive: 6 plays, 61 yards, 2:15.
- TB – (0:55) Connor Barth 49-yard field goal, Browns 7–3, Drive: 5 plays, 49 yards, 1:58.

Second quarter

- CLE – (5:42) Peyton Hillis 10-yard run (Phil Dawson kick), Browns 14–3, Drive: 5 plays, 63 yards, 3:09.
- TB – (0:26) Mike Williams 3-yard pass from Josh Freeman (Connor Barth kick), Browns 14–10, Drive: 1 plays, 3 yards, 0:08.

Third quarter

Fourth quarter

- TB – (6:56) Micheal Spurlock 33-yard pass from Josh Freeman (Connor Barth kick), Buccaneers 17–14, Drive: 6 plays, 47 yards, 1:52.

Top passers

- CLE – Jake Delhomme – 20/37, 227 yards, 1 touchdown, 2 interceptions
- TB – Josh Freeman – 17/28, 182 yards, 2 touchdowns, 1 interception

Top rushers

- CLE – Jerome Harrison – 9 rushes, 52 yards
- TB – Cadillac Williams – 22 rushes, 75 yards

Top receivers

- CLE – Evan Moore – 3 receptions, 87 yards
- TB – Micheal Spurlock – 2 receptions, 49 yards, 1 touchdown

Top tacklers

- CLE – T. J. Ward – 7 tackles, 3 assists, 1 forced fumble
- TB – Barrett Ruud – 7 tackles, 1 assist, 1 forced fumble

The Tampa Bay Buccaneers began the 2010 season against the Browns. In the first quarter, Jake Delhomme completed a 41-yard touchdown pass to Mohamed Massaquoi for a 7–0 lead. Buccaneers kicker Connor Barth made a 49-yard field goal to trim the deficit to 7–3. In the second quarter, the Browns increased their lead with a Peyton Hillis touchdown run. Josh Freeman completed a 3-yard touchdown pass to Mike Williams for a 14–10 halftime score.

The Buccaneers took the lead in the fourth quarter with Freeman's second touchdown pass, this time to Micheal Spurlock. The Buccaneers held the Browns scoreless in the second half and won their first opening day game since 2005.

=== Week 2: at Carolina Panthers ===
Week 2: Tampa Bay Buccaneers at Carolina Panthers – Game summary

Quarter	1	2	3	4	Total
Buccaneers	7	7	3	3	20
Panthers	0	7	0	0	7

at Bank of America Stadium, Charlotte, North Carolina

- Date: September 19
- Game time: 1:00 p.m. EDT
- Game weather: 89 °F (32 °C) (Sunny)
- Game attendance: 72,577
- Referee: Walt Coleman
- TV announcers (Fox): Dick Stockton, Charles Davis, Jim Mora & Laura Okmin
- Recap

Game information

First quarter

- TB – Earnest Graham 14-yard pass from Josh Freeman (Connor Barth kick), Buccaneers 7–0, Drive: 8 plays, 54 yards, 3:59.

Second quarter

- CAR – Steve Smith 37-yard pass from Matt Moore (John Kasay kick), Tied 7–7, Drive: 6 plays, 88 yards, 4:00.
- TB – Mike Williams 35-yard pass from Josh Freeman (Connor Barth kick), Buccaneers 14–7, Drive: 8 plays, 80 yards, 4:00.

Third quarter

- TB – Connor Barth 24-yard field goal, Buccaneers 17–7, Drive: 6 plays, 19 yards, 3:09.

Fourth quarter

- TB – Connor Barth 33-yard field goal, Buccaneers 20–7, Drive: 10 plays, 50 yards, 4:51.

Top passers

- TB – Josh Freeman – 12/24, 178 yards, 2 touchdowns
- CAR – Matt Moore – 6/16, 125 yards, 1 touchdown, 1 interception

Top rushers

- TB – Cadillac Williams – 27 rushes, 51 yards
- CAR – DeAngelo Williams – 17 rushes, 54 yards

Top receivers

- TB – Kellen Winslow – 4 receptions, 83 yards
- CAR – Steve Smith – 3 receptions, 66 yards, 1 touchdown

Top tacklers

- TB – Barrett Ruud – 6 tackles, 3 assists
- CAR – James Anderson – 8 tackles, 2 assists

The Buccaneers took a 7–0 lead after a 14-yard touchdown pass from Josh Freeman to Earnest Graham. Carolina tied answered with Matt Moore completing a 37-yard touchdown pass to Steve Smith. Tampa Bay scored a 35-yard touchdown pass to Mike Williams to take a 14–7 lead into half time. Connor Barth scored two field goals in the second half, and Tampa Bay won 20–7.

The Buccaneers defense dominated Carolina, holding Jonathan Stewart and DeAngelo Williams to 43 and 54 yards rushing, respectively. Matt Moore completed only 6 of 16 passes with one interception, while being sacked four times. Moore was benched in favor of rookie Jimmy Clausen, who was unable to rally the Panthers. Josh Freeman passed for 178 yards and two touchdowns. With the win, Tampa Bay improved to 2–0.

=== Week 3: vs. Pittsburgh Steelers ===
Week 3: Pittsburgh Steelers vs Tampa Bay Buccaneers – Game summary

Quarter	1	2	3	4	Total
Steelers	7	21	3	7	38
Buccaneers	3	3	0	7	13

at Raymond James Stadium, Tampa, Florida

- Date: September 26
- Game time: 1:00 p.m. EDT
- Game weather: 90 °F (32 °C) (Cloudy)
- Game attendance: 61,036
- Referee: Bill Leavy
- TV announcers (CBS): Gus Johnson and Steve Tasker (blacked out locally)
- Recap

Game information

First quarter

- TB – Connor Barth 40-yard field goal, Buccaneers 3–0, Drive: 4 plays, 9 yards, 1:58.
- PIT – Mike Wallace 46-yard pass from Charlie Batch (Jeff Reed kick), Steelers 7–3, Drive: 2 plays, 45 yards, 0:53.

Second quarter

- TB – Connor Barth 24-yard field goal, Steelers 7–6, Drive: 15 plays, 74 yards, 8:45.
- PIT – Rashard Mendenhall 3-yard run (Jeff Reed kick), Steelers 14–6, Drive: 6 plays, 67 yards, 3:49.
- PIT – Mike Wallace 41-yard pass from Charlie Batch (Jeff Reed kick), Steelers 21–6, Drive: 2 plays, 44 yards, 0:47.
- PIT – Hines Ward 9-yard pass from Charlie Batch (Jeff Reed kick), Steelers 28–6, Drive: 11 plays, 79 yards, 4:02.

Third quarter

- PIT – Jeff Reed 24-yard field goal, Steelers 31–6, Drive: 8 plays, 53 yards, 4:21.

Fourth quarter

- PIT – Brett Keisel 79-yard interception return (Jeff Reed kick), Steelers 38–6.
- TB – LeGarrette Blount 1-yard run (Connor Barth kick), Steelers 38–13, Drive: 10 plays, 68 yards, 4:09.

Top passers

- PIT – Charlie Batch – 12/17, 186 yards, 3 touchdowns, 2 interceptions
- TB – Josh Freeman – 20/31, 184 yards, 1 interception

Top rushers

- PIT – Rashard Mendenhall – 19 rushes, 143 yards, 1 touchdown
- TB – LeGarrette Blount – 6 rushes, 27 yards, 1 touchdown

Top receivers

- PIT – Mike Wallace – 3 receptions, 100 yards, 2 touchdowns
- TB – Earnest Graham – 4 receptions, 57 yards

Top tacklers

- PIT – Lawrence Timmons – 5 tackles, 2 assists, 1 sack
- TB – Ronde Barber – 8 tackles, 1 assist

Tampa Bay took an early 3–0 lead with Connor Barth's 40-yard field goal. However, Pittsburgh dominated the remainder of the game. Mike Wallace caught two touchdown passes of 46 yards and 41 yards, respectively. The Steelers rushed for 201 yards, and routed Tampa Bay 38–13.

=== Week 5: at Cincinnati Bengals ===
Week 5: Tampa Bay Buccaneers at Cincinnati Bengals – Game summary

Quarter	1	2	3	4	Total
Buccaneers	0	7	7	10	24
Bengals	7	3	3	8	21

at Paul Brown Stadium, Cincinnati, Ohio

- Date: October 10
- Game time: 1:00 p.m. EDT
- Game weather: 81 °F (27 °C) (Sunny)
- Game attendance: 63,888
- Referee: Scott Green
- TV announcers (Fox): Thom Brennaman, Brian Billick and Charissa Thompson
- Recap

Game information

First quarter

- CIN – Terrell Owens 43-yard pass from Carson Palmer (Mike Nugent kick), Bengals 7–0, Drive: 3 plays, 55 yards, 1:02.

Second quarter

- TB – Cody Grimm 11-yard interception return (Connor Barth kick), Tied 7–7.
- CIN – Mike Nugent 31-yard field goal, Bengals 10–7, Drive: 10 plays, 69 yards, 2:19.

Third quarter

- TB – Earnest Graham 1-yard run (Connor Barth kick), Buccaneers 14–10, Drive: 9 plays, 80 yards, 5:10.
- CIN – Mike Nugent 35-yard field goal, Buccaneers 14–13, Drive: 9 plays, 55 yards, 3:59.

Fourth quarter

- CIN – Jermaine Gresham 1-yard pass from Carson Palmer (Cedric Benson run), Bengals 21–14, Drive: 7 plays, 29 yards, 4:12.
- TB – Mike Williams 20-yard pass from Josh Freeman (Connor Barth kick), Tied 21–21, Drive: 5 plays, 50 yards, 0:52.
- TB – Connor Barth 31-yard field goal, Buccaneers 24–21, Drive: 2 plays, 21 yards, 0:13.

Top passers

- TB – Josh Freeman – 20/33, 280 yards, 1 touchdown, 1 interception
- CIN – Carson Palmer – 21/36, 209 yards, 2 touchdowns, 3 interceptions

Top rushers

- TB – Earnest Graham – 3 rushes, 65 yards, 1 touchdown
- CIN – Cedric Benson – 23 rushes, 144 yards

Top receivers

- TB – Mike Williams – 7 receptions, 99 yards, 1 touchdown
- CIN – Terrell Owens – 7 receptions, 102 yards, 1 touchdown

Top tacklers

- TB – Sabby Piscitelli – 7 tackles, 1 interception
- CIN – Chris Crocker – 8 tackles, 1 assist, 2 sacks, 1 forced fumble

Coming out of their bye week, the Buccaneers traveled to Cincinnati to face the Bengals. The Bengals took an early 7–0 lead after Carson Palmer threw a 43-yard touchdown pass to Terrell Owens. At the end the first quarter, the Buccaneers pinned the Bengals back at their own 6-yard line. One the first play of the second quarter, Cody Grimm intercepted Palmer, and returned the ball 11 yards for a touchdown for a 7–7 tie. A Mike Nugent 31-yard field goal gave the Bengals a 10–7 halftime lead.

In the third quarter, Tampa Bay drove 80 yards for their second touchdown, and a 14–10 lead. the Bengals replied with a field goal, to trim their deficit to 14–13. Micheal Spurlock fumbled the ensuing kickoff, and the Bengals recovered deep in Tampa Bay territory.

In the fourth quarter, the Bengals capitalized on the turnover. Palmer found Jermaine Gresham for a 1-yard touchdown pass (along with a successful Cedric Benson 2-point conversion run) to take a 21–14 lead. The teams traded possession twice, and with 2:28 remaining, the Bengals faced 3rd down & 8 at their own 43-yard line. Tampa Bay had no timeouts, and a first down would secure the win for Cincinnati. Palmer was intercepted by Aqib Talib at the 50-yard line. Five plays later, Josh Freeman completed a 20-yard touchdown pass to Mike Williams. With 25 second left, the Buccaneers again intercepted Palmer. Sabby Piscitelli returned the ball to the Cincinnati 34-yard line. With 5 seconds left in regulation, Connor Barth made a 31-yard field goal to win the game 24–21.

As of 2026, this was the last time that the Buccaneers beat the Bengals.

=== Week 6: vs. New Orleans Saints ===
Week 6: New Orleans Saints vs Tampa Bay Buccaneers – Game summary

Quarter	1	2	3	4	Total
Saints	7	10	7	7	31
Buccaneers	0	0	0	6	6

at Raymond James Stadium, Tampa, Florida

- Date: October 17
- Game time: 12:00 p.m. CDT
- Game weather: 81 °F (27 °C) (Clear)
- Game attendance: 51,759
- Referee: Clete Blakeman
- TV announcers (Fox): Sam Rosen and Tim Ryan (blacked out locally)
- Recap

Game information

First quarter

- NO – Lance Moore 41-yard pass from Drew Brees (Garrett Hartley kick), Saints 7–0, Drive: 7 plays, 94 yards, 4:36.

Second quarter

- NO – Robert Meachem 42-yard pass from Drew Brees (Garrett Hartley kick), Saints 14–0, Drive: 9 plays, 80 yards, 4:39.
- NO – Garrett Hartley 27-yard field goal, Saints 17–0, Drive: 11 plays, 77 yards, 4:31.

Third quarter

- NO – Heath Evans 4-yard pass from Drew Brees (Garrett Hartley kick), Saints 24–0, Drive: 8 plays, 46 yards, 4:17.

Fourth quarter

- TB – Micheal Spurlock 2-yard pass from Josh Freeman (pass failed), Saints 24–6, Drive: 14 plays, 88 yards, 6:13.
- NO – Ladell Betts 1-yard run (Garrett Hartley kick), Saints 31–6, Drive: 7 plays, 45 yards, 3:41.

Top passers

- NO – Drew Brees – 21/32, 263 yards, 3 touchdowns, 1 interception
- TB – Josh Freeman – 25/43, 219 yards, 1 touchdown

Top rushers

- NO – Chris Ivory – 15 rushes, 158 yards
- TB – Cadillac Williams – 10 rushes, 18 yards

Top receivers

- NO – Robert Meachem – 4 receptions, 71 yards, 1 touchdown
- TB – Cadillac Williams – 7 receptions, 63 yards

Top tacklers

- NO – Roman Harper – 7 tackles, 2 forced fumbles
- TB – Sean Jones – 8 tackles

Tampa Bay trailed early after Drew Brees completed touchdown passes of 41 yards and 42 yards to Lance Moore and Robert Meachem. New Orleans led Tampa Bay 24–0 at the end of the third quarter. Tampa Bay scored in the fourth quarter with Josh Freeman completing 2-yard touchdown pass to Micheal Spurlock, and avoided a shutout.

=== Week 7: vs. St. Louis Rams ===
Week 10: St. Louis Rams vs Tampa Bay Buccaneers – Game summary

Quarter	1	2	3	4	Total
Rams	0	17	0	0	17
Buccaneers	3	3	6	6	18

at Raymond James Stadium, Tampa, Florida

- Date: October 24
- Game time: 1:00 p.m. EDT
- Game weather: 84 °F (29 °C) (Clear)
- Game attendance: 42,020
- Referee: Mike Carey
- TV announcers (Fox): Dick Stockton, Charles Davis, Jim Mora & Laura Okmin (blacked out locally)
- Recap

Game information

First quarter

- TB – Connor Barth 35-yard field goal, Buccaneers 3–0, Drive: 4 plays, −10 yards, 2:51.

Second quarter

- STL – Josh Brown 25-yard field goal, Tied 3–3, Drive: 13 plays, 72 yards, 5:50.
- STL – Danny Amendola 5-yard pass from Sam Bradford (Josh Brown kick), Rams 10–3, Drive: 11 plays, 80 yards, 5:18.
- STL – Michael Hoomanawanui 2-yard pass from Sam Bradford (Josh Brown kick), Rams 17–3, Drive: 8 plays, 45 yards, 3:41.
- TB – Connor Barth 39-yard field goal, Rams 17–6, Drive: 10 plays, 43 yards, 2:35.

Third quarter

- TB – Connor Barth 53-yard field goal, Rams 17–9, Drive: 11 plays, 60 yards, 6:09.
- TB – Connor Barth 38-yard field goal, Rams 17–12, Drive: 9 plays, 49 yards, 4:44.

Fourth quarter

- TB – Cadillac Williams 1-yard pass from Josh Freeman (run failed), Buccaneers 18–17, Drive: 16 plays, 81 yards, 4:35.

Top passers

- STL – Sam Bradford – 13/26, 126 yards, 2 touchdowns
- TB – Josh Freeman – 23/40, 212 yards, 1 touchdown

Top rushers

- STL – Steven Jackson – 22 rushes, 110 yards
- TB – LeGarrette Blount – 11 rushes, 72 yards

Top receivers

- STL – Steven Jackson – 2 receptions, 35 yards
- TB – Mike Williams – 5 receptions, 82 yards

Top tacklers

- STL – James Laurinaitis – 7 tackles, 1 assist
- TB – Barrett Ruud – 8 tackles, 3 assists

Tampa Bay took the lead 3–0 as kicker Connor Barth made a 35-yard field goal. The Rams, however, scored 17 unanswered points in the second quarter. Josh Brown made a 25-yard field goal. The next two Rams drives saw two Sam Bradford touchdown passes to Danny Amendola and Michael Hoomanawanui, respectively. Barth nailed a 39-yard field goal at the end of the second quarter, and the Rams took a 17–6 lead into halftime.

The Buccaneers offense continued to sputter in the second half. Barth connected on two more field goals (53 yards and 38 yards) to trim the score to 17–12. The Tampa Bay defense held the Rams scoreless in the third quarter.

With 4:45 remaining in the fourth quarter, the Buccaneer offense finally broke through. Josh Freeman led the team on a 16-play, 81-yard drive, capped off by a 1-yard touchdown pass to "Cadillac" Williams with 10 seconds left in the game. A failed two-point conversion followed, but the Buccaneers held on to win 18–17.

Jerramy Stevens was left inactive for the game, following a drug-related arrest the night before the game. A day later, Stevens was released.

=== Week 8: at Arizona Cardinals ===
Week 8: Tampa Bay Buccaneers at Arizona Cardinals – Game summary

Quarter	1	2	3	4	Total
Buccaneers	7	17	7	7	38
Cardinals	7	7	14	7	35

at University of Phoenix Stadium, Glendale, Arizona

- Date: October 31
- Game time: 4:15 p.m. EDT
- Game weather: None (retractable roof closed)
- Game attendance: 61,857
- Referee: Ron Winter
- TV announcers (Fox): Chris Myers, Brian Billick and Jaime Maggio
- Recap

Game information

First quarter

- ARI – Larry Fitzgerald 3-yard pass from Max Hall (Jay Feely kick), Cardinals 7–0, Drive: 9 plays, 61 yards, 4:38.
- TB – Gerald Hayes 41-yard interception return (Connor Barth kick), Tied 7–7.

Second quarter

- ARI – Beanie Wells 1-yard run (Jay Feely kick), Cardinals 14–7, Drive: 4 plays, 16 yards, 2:03.
- TB – Mike Williams 47-yard pass from Josh Freeman (Connor Barth kick), Tied 14–14, Drive: 3 plays, 80 yards, 1:18.
- TB – Aqib Talib 45-yard interception return (Connor Barth kick), ''Buccaneers 21–14.
- TB – Connor Barth 21-yard field goal, Buccaneers 24–14, Drive: 12 plays, 94 yards, 3:15.

Third quarter

- TB – LeGarrette Blount 15-yard run (Connor Barth kick), Buccaneers 31–14, Drive: 8 plays, 80 yards, 4:47.
- ARI – LaRod Stephens-Howling 30-yard run (Jay Feely kick), Buccaneers 31–21, Drive: 7 plays, 76 yards, 3:39.
- ARI – Gerald Hayes 21-yard fumble return (Jay Feely kick), Buccaneers 31–28.

Fourth quarter

- ARI – Larry Fitzgerald 5-yard pass from Derek Anderson (Connor Barth kick), Cardinals 35–31, Drive: 4 plays, 48 yards, 4:38.
- TB – LeGarrette Blount 1-yard run (Connor Barth kick), Buccaneers 38–35, Drive: 7 plays, 74 yards, 4:28.

Top passers

- TB – Josh Freeman – 18/25, 278 yards, 1 touchdown
- ARI – Derek Anderson – 16/24, 234 yards, 1 touchdown, 2 interceptions

Top rushers

- TB – LeGarrette Blount – 22 rushes, 120 yards, 2 touchdowns
- ARI – Beanie Wells – 16 rushes, 50 yards, 1 touchdown

Top receivers

- TB – Mike Williams – 4 receptions, 105 yards, 1 touchdown
- ARI – Steve Breaston – 8 receptions, 147 yards

Top tacklers

- TB – Cody Grimm – 4 tackles, 4 assists
- ARI – Kerry Rhodes – 9 tackles, 1 assist

The Buccaneers won their fifth straight road game (dating back to the previous season) with a shootout win against the Cardinals.

Arizona took the early lead after a 3-yard touchdown pass from Max Hall to Larry Fitzgerald. On their next drive, Geno Hayes intercepted Hall, and returned 41-yards for a touchdown. Early in the second quarter, Buccaneers returner Sammie Stroughter muffed a punt and the ball was recovered by the Cardinals at the Tampa Bay 16-yard line. Beanie Wells scored a 1-yard touchdown run off the turnover, and the Cardinals led 14–7. On the ensuing drive, Josh Freeman drove the Buccaneers 80 yards in only three plays, completing a 47-yard touchdown pass to Mike Williams and a 14–14 tie. Four plays later, Aqib Talib returned Hall's second interception 45 yards for a touchdown and the Buccaneers led 21–14. Hall was benched in favor of Derek Anderson. Anderson drove the Cardinals to the Tampa Bay 3-yard line, but threw incomplete on a 4th down & 2 and turned the ball over on downs. Tampa Bay drove 94 yards in the final three minutes, and Connor Barth kicked a field goal as the half expired.

In the third quarter, Tampa Bay increased their lead to 31–14 after a LeGarrette Blount touchdown run. Arizona rallied, however. LaRod Stephens-Howling rushed for a 30-yard touchdown with one minute left in the third quarter. Blount fumbled the ball on the first play of the ensuing drive, and Gerald Hayes recovered the ball 21 yards for a Cardinals touchdown.

With 9:46 left in the game, Arizona took the lead 35–31 following Anderson's 5-yard touchdown pass to Fitzgerald. Tampa Bay answered with Blount's second touchdown run, and a 38–35 lead. Barrett Ruud intercepted Anderson on the first play of the next drive, which set up a 53-yard field goal attempt by Barth. Tampa Bay chose to attempt the long field goal instead of punting. The kick was blocked, and the Cardinals took over with 3:16 remaining in good field position. Anderson drove the Cardinals to the Tampa Bay 20-yard line, but he was intercepted by Aqib Talib, who clinched the win for Tampa Bay.

=== Week 9: at Atlanta Falcons ===
Week 9: Tampa Bay Buccaneers at Atlanta Falcons – Game summary

Quarter	1	2	3	4	Total
Buccaneers	0	14	7	0	21
Falcons	7	10	10	0	27

at Georgia Dome, Atlanta, Georgia

- Date: November 7
- Game time: 1:00 p.m. EST
- Game weather: None (dome stadium)
- Game attendance: 67,266
- Referee: Terry McAulay
- TV announcers (Fox): Thom Brennaman, Brian Billick, & Chris Myers
- Recap

Game information

First quarter

- ATL – Michael Turner 2-yard run (Matt Bryant kick), Falcons 7–0, Drive: 13 plays, 61 yards, 6:54.

Second quarter

- ATL – Michael Turner 10-yard run (Matt Bryant kick), Falcons 14–0, Drive: 10 plays, 99 yards, 3:59.
- TB – Arrelious Benn 14-yard pass from Josh Freeman (Connor Barth kick), Falcons 14–7, Drive: 4 plays, 32 yards, 1:29.
- ATL – Matt Bryant 31-yard field goal, Falcons 17–7, Drive: 11 plays, 72 yards, 6:43.
- TB – Mike Williams 58-yard pass from Josh Freeman (Connor Barth kick), Falcons 17–14, Drive: 7 plays, 90 yards, 3:21.

Third quarter

- ATL – Michael Palmer 5-yard pass from Matt Ryan (Matt Bryant kick), Falcons 24–14, Drive: 7 plays, 30 yards, 3:03.
- ATL – Matt Bryant 41-yard field goal, Falcons 27–14, Drive: 11 plays, 59 yards, 5:54.
- TB – Micheal Spurlock 89-yard kickoff return (Connor Barth kick), Falcons 27–21, Drive: 0 plays, 0 yards, 0:16.

Fourth quarter

- No scoring plays

Top passers

- TB – Josh Freeman – 11/22, 189 yards, 2 touchdowns, 2 interceptions
- ATL – Matt Ryan – 24/36, 235 yards, 1 touchdown

Top rushers

- TB – LeGarrette Blount – 13 rushes, 46 yards
- ATL – Michael Turner – 24 rushes, 107 yards, 2 touchdowns

Top receivers

- TB – Mike Williams – 4 receptions, 89 yards, 1 touchdown
- ATL – Tony Gonzalez – 8 receptions, 72 yards

Top tacklers

- TB – Quincy Black – 7 tackles, 1 assist
- ATL – Stephen Nicholas – 7 tackles, 1 assist

Michael Turner rushed for 107 yards and two touchdowns, as the Falcons held off the Buccaneers 27–21 in an NFC South division rivalry game. The Falcons took an early 14–0 lead after Turner's two touchdown runs of 2 and 10 yards. Micheal Spurlock took the next kickoff return 66 yards to the Atlanta 32-yard line, which set up Tampa Bay's first score. Josh Freeman completed a 14-yard touchdown pass to Arrelious Benn to make the score 14–7. Atlanta drove to the Tampa Bay 13, and Matt Bryant made a 31-yard field goal to increase the lead to 17–7. With two minutes remaining in the half, Freeman found Mike Williams for a 58-yard touchdown pass, and a 17–14 halftime score.

On the first drive of the third quarter, Freeman was intercepted by Jonathan Babineaux at the Tampa Bay 30-yard line. Matt Ryan threw a 5-yard touchdown pass to Michael Palmer. After another field goal Atlanta led 27–14. On the ensuing kickoff, Maurice Stovall bobbled the ball, and Micheal Spurlock scooped it up at the 11-yard line. Spurlock avoided tackles, and tightroped down the sideline for an 89-yard kickoff return touchdown.

Trailing 27–21 with 2:44 remaining, Freeman had driven the Buccaneers 89 yards in 12 plays to the Atlanta 2-yard line. Facing 4th down & 1 at the Atlanta 2, LeGarrette Blount was tackled for no gain, and held at the line of scrimmage, which turned the ball over on downs. Atlanta remained undefeated at home, winning 27–21.

=== Week 10: vs. Carolina Panthers ===
Week 10: Carolina Panthers vs Tampa Bay Buccaneers – Game summary

Quarter	1	2	3	4	Total
Panthers	3	7	3	3	16
Buccaneers	7	14	0	10	31

at Raymond James Stadium, Tampa, Florida

- Date: November 14
- Game time: 1:00 p.m. EST
- Game weather: 73 °F (23 °C) (Sunny)
- Game attendance: 44,264
- Referee: Jerome Boger
- TV announcers (Fox): Dick Stockton, Charles Davis, Jim Mora and Laura Okmin (blacked out locally)
- Recap

Game information

First quarter

- TB – Arrelious Benn 8-yard pass from Josh Freeman (Connor Barth kick), Buccaneers 7–0, Drive: 4 plays, 47 yards, 2:07.
- CAR – John Kasay 46-yard field goal, Buccaneers 7–3, Drive: 7 plays, 14 yards, 3:33.

Second quarter

- TB – LeGarrette Blount 17-yard run (Connor Barth kick), Buccaneers 14–3, Drive: 6 plays, 87 yards, 3:29.
- CAR – Josh Vaughan 2-yard run (John Kasay kick), Buccaneers 14–10, Drive: 6 plays, 46 yards, 2:32.
- TB – Kellen Winslow 20-yard pass from Josh Freeman (Connor Barth kick), Buccaneers 21–10, Drive: 8 plays, 65 yards, 3:15.

Third quarter

- CAR – John Kasay 28-yard field goal, Buccaneers 21–13, Drive: 6 plays, 69 yards, 2:19.
- CAR – John Kasay 48-yard field goal, Buccaneers 21–16, Drive: 4 plays, 3 yards, 1:36.

Fourth quarter

- TB – Connor Barth 32-yard field goal, Buccaneers 24–16, Drive: 10 plays, 66 yards, 6:00.
- TB – Cadillac Williams 45-yard run (Connor Barth kick), Buccaneers 31–16, Drive: 7 plays, 66 yards, 3:58.

Top passers

- CAR – Jimmy Clausen – 16/29, 191 yards
- TB – Josh Freeman – 18/24, 241 yards, 2 touchdowns

Top rushers

- CAR – Mike Goodson – 23 rushes, 100 yards
- TB – LeGarrette Blount – 19 rushes, 91 yards, 1 touchdown

Top receivers

- CAR – Steve Smith – 3 receptions, 47 yards
- TB – Mike Williams – 4 receptions, 68 yards

Top tacklers

- CAR – Nic Harris – 7 tackles, 3 assists
- TB – Barrett Ruud – 7 tackles, 3 assists, 1.0 sack

Hoping to rebound from their loss to the Falcons the Buccaneers played on home ground for an NFC South rivalry match against the Panthers. In the 1st quarter the Buccaneers took the lead as QB Josh Freeman made an 8-yard TD pass to WR Arrelious Benn. The Panthers narrowed the lead with kicker John Kasay hitting a 46-yard field goal. The Buccaneers increased their lead in the second quarter with RB LeGarrette Blount getting a 17-yard TD run; but the Panthers replied with RB Josh Vaughan making a 2-yard TD run. Tampa Bay scored again when Freeman found TE Kellen Winslow on a 20-yard TD pass. The lead was narrowed with Kasay's 28 and 48-yard field goals, but the Buccaneers pulled away in the fourth quarter with kicker Connor Barth nailing a 32-yard field goal, and with RB Cadillac Williams getting a 45-yard TD run.

With the win, Tampa Bay not only improved to 6–3, but achieved a season sweep over the Carolina Panthers.

=== Week 11: at San Francisco 49ers ===
Week 11: Tampa Bay Buccaneers at San Francisco 49ers – Game summary

Quarter	1	2	3	4	Total
Buccaneers	0	7	7	7	21
49ers	0	0	0	0	0

at Candlestick Park, San Francisco, California

- Date: November 21
- Game time: 4:05 p.m. EST
- Game weather: 54 °F (12 °C) (Cloudy)
- Game attendance: 69,732
- Referee: John Parry
- TV announcers (Fox): Chris Myers and Kurt Warner
- Recap

Game information

First quarter

- No scoring plays

Second quarter

- TB – Cadillac Williams 6-yard run (Connor Barth kick), Buccaneers 7–0, Drive: 14 plays, 80 yards, 7:31.

Third quarter

- TB – Mike Williams 8-yard pass from Josh Freeman (Connor Barth kick), Buccaneers 14–0, Drive: 5 plays, 66 yards, 2:55.

Fourth quarter

- TB – Donald Penn 1-yard pass from Josh Freeman (Connor Barth kick), Buccaneers 21–0, Drive: 4 plays, 7 yards, 2:17.

Top passers

- TB – Josh Freeman – 13/20, 136 yards, 2 touchdowns
- SF – Troy Smith – 16/31, 148 yards, 1 interception

Top rushers

- TB – LeGarrette Blount – 26 rushes, 82 yards
- SF – Troy Smith – 5 rushes, 45 yards

Top receivers

- TB – Mike Williams – 3 receptions, 54 yards, 1 touchdown
- SF – Josh Morgan – 4 receptions, 51 yards

Top tacklers

- TB – Cody Grimm – 5 tackles, 2 assists
- SF – Patrick Willis – 9 tackles, 4 assists, 2.0 sacks

Tampa Bay sacked Troy Smith six times, forced two turnovers, and held the 49ers to only 189 total yards of offense, in a shutout win by the score of 21–0. It was the Buccaneers first win at San Francisco since 1980, and the 49ers first home shutout since 1977.

Early in the second quarter, Tampa Bay drove 80 yards in 14 plays, culminating in a 6-yard touchdown run by Cadillac Williams. Tampa Bay took a 7–0 lead into halftime.

With 3:36 remaining in the third quarter, Josh Freeman completed a pass 33 yards to Mike Williams to the San Francisco 33-yard line. Four plays later, Freeman completed to Williams for an 8-yard touchdown pass, and a 14–0 lead. The Tampa Bay defense forced a turnover on downs, and on San Francisco's next possession, Ronde Barber intercepted Troy Smith. The turnover led to Tampa Bay's third touchdown, a 1-yard pass to offensive tackle Donald Penn.

With the shut out win, Tampa Bay improved to 7–3

Wide receiver Mike Williams was arrested two days before the game for DUI charges, but was released on bail and played in the game.

=== Week 12: at Baltimore Ravens ===
Week 12: Tampa Bay Buccaneers at Baltimore Ravens – Game summary

Quarter	1	2	3	4	Total
Buccaneers	0	3	0	7	10
Ravens	0	17	0	0	17

at M&T Bank Stadium, Baltimore, Maryland

- Date: November 28
- Game time: 4:15 p.m. EST
- Game weather: 48 °F (9 °C) (Clear)
- Game attendance: 70,989
- Referee: Carl Cheffers
- TV announcers (Fox): Sam Rosen and Tim Ryan
- Recap

Game information

First quarter

Second quarter

- BAL – Billy Cundiff 45-yard field goal, Ravens 3–0, Drive: 7 plays, 14 yards, 3:05.
- TB – Connor Barth 22-yard field goal, Tied 3–3, Drive: 10 plays, 32 yards, 4:24.
- BAL – Todd Heap 65-yard pass from Joe Flacco (Billy Cundiff kick), Ravens 10–3, Drive: 4 plays, 76 yards, 1:28.
- BAL – Derrick Mason 10-yard pass from Joe Flacco (Billy Cundiff kick), Ravens 17–3, Drive: 5 plays, 55 yards, 1:22.

Third quarter

Fourth quarter

- TB – Kellen Winslow 5-yard pass from Josh Freeman (Connor Barth kick), Ravens 17–10, Drive: 13 plays, 77 yards, 4:38.

Top passers

- TB – Josh Freeman – 17/37, 162 yards, 1 touchdown
- BAL – Joe Flacco – 25/35, 289 yards, 2 touchdowns, 1 interception

Top rushers

- TB – LeGarrette Blount – 13 rushes, 55 yards
- BAL – Ray Rice – 19 rushes, 82 yards

Top receivers

- TB – Kellen Winslow – 4 receptions, 44 yards, 1 touchdown
- BAL – Derrick Mason – 8 receptions, 87 yards, 1 touchdown

Top tacklers

- TB – Geno Hayes – 6 tackles
- BAL – Ray Lewis – 7 tackles, 5 assists

The Buccaneers traveled to M&T Bank Stadium to face the Baltimore Ravens. In a largely defensive game, the teams traded field goals in the second quarter. The game was tied 3–3 with 4:32 remaining in the first half. Quarterback Joe Flacco struck quickly, however, completing touchdown passes of 65 yards and 10 yards, to Todd Heap and Derrick Mason respectively, just before half time.

Trailing 17–3 with about three minutes left in the game, Josh Freeman completed a 5-yard touchdown pass to Kellen Winslow. The Buccaneers were unable to get the ball back on offense, and fell by a score of 17–10.

=== Week 13: vs. Atlanta Falcons ===
Week 13: Atlanta Falcons vs Tampa Bay Buccaneers – Game summary

Quarter	1	2	3	4	Total
Falcons	7	7	0	14	28
Buccaneers	7	7	3	7	24

at Raymond James Stadium, Tampa, Florida

- Date: December 5
- Game time: 4:15 p.m. EST
- Game weather: 72 °F (22 °C) (Sunny)
- Game attendance: 53,955
- Referee: Tony Corrente
- TV announcers (Fox): Dick Stockton, Charles Davis, Jim Mora & Laura Okmin (blacked out locally)
- Recap

Game information

First quarter

- ATL – Michael Turner 5-yard run (Matt Bryant kick), Falcons 7–0, Drive: 6 plays, 52 yards, 3:16.
- TB – LeGarrette Blount 6-yard run (Connor Barth kick), Tied 7–7, Drive: 11 plays, 86 yards, 5:58.

Second quarter

- ATL – Ovie Mughelli 17-yard pass from Matt Ryan (Matt Bryant kick), Falcons 14–7, Drive: 8 plays, 60 yards, 2:34.
- TB – Mike Williams 1-yard pass from Josh Freeman (Connor Barth kick), Tied 14–14, Drive: 7 plays, 30 yards, 1:24.

Third quarter

- TB – Connor Barth 33-yard field goal, Buccaneers 17–14, Drive: 8 plays, 51 yards, 3:26.

Fourth quarter

- TB – John Gilmore 2-yard pass from Earnest Graham (Connor Barth kick), Buccaneers 24–14, Drive: 4 plays, 39 yards, 2:00.
- ATL – Eric Weems 102-yard kickoff return (Matt Bryant kick), Buccaneers 24–21, Drive: 0 plays, 0 yards, 0:21.
- ATL – Michael Jenkins 9-yard pass from Matt Ryan (Matt Bryant kick), Falcons 28–24, Drive: 10 plays, 67 yards, 3:59.

Top passers

- ATL – Matt Ryan – 18/36, 205 yards, 2 touchdowns, 2 interceptions
- TB – Josh Freeman – 19/38, 181 yards, 1 touchdown, 1 interception

Top rushers

- ATL – Michael Turner – 24 rushes, 88 yards, 1 touchdown
- TB – LeGarrette Blount – 20 rushes, 103 yards, 1 touchdown

Top receivers

- ATL – Roddy White – 7 receptions, 74 yards
- TB – Mike Williams – 6 receptions, 68 yards, 1 touchdown

Top tacklers

- ATL – Curtis Lofton – 7 tackles, 2 assists
- TB – E.J. Biggers, Quincy Black – 7 tackles

The Buccaneers hosted division rival Atlanta, wearing their orange throwback uniforms. Tied 7–7 in the second quarter, Matt Ryan completed a 17-yard touchdown pass to Ovie Mughelli and a 14–7 Atlanta lead. With two minutes left in the first half, Ryan was intercepted by Sean Jones. With 15 seconds left in the half, Josh Freeman threw a touchdown pass to Mike Williams, to tie the score at 14–14.

Connor Barth kicked a 33-yard field goal, and Tampa Bay took a 17–14 lead in the third quarter. With 12:33 left in the game, Corey Lynch intercepted Matt Ryan. The turnover led to a 2-yard touchdown pass to John Gilmore, and Tampa Bay led 24–14 with 10:24 remaining.

Eric Weems returned the ensuing kickoff 102 yards for a touchdown. That trimmed the lead to 24–21. On Atlanta's next drive, Ronde Barber was called for pass interference, and Quincy Black was penalized for a "horse-collar tackle." Atlanta quickly scored a 9-yard touchdown pass to Michael Jenkins, and took a 28–24 lead with 4:31 left.

Josh Freeman led Tampa Bay on a hopeful go-ahead drive. Facing 4th down and 12 at the Atlanta 46-yard line, Freeman completed a 19-yard pass to Sammie Stroughter to keep the drive alive. On the next play, however, Freeman was intercepted by Brent Grimes at the 19-yard line, securing the victory for Atlanta.

=== Week 14: at Washington Redskins ===
Week 14: Tampa Bay Buccaneers at Washington Redskins – Game summary

Quarter	1	2	3	4	Total
Buccaneers	0	3	6	8	17
Redskins	0	10	0	6	16

at FedExField, Landover, Maryland

- Date: December 12
- Game time: 1:00 p.m. EST
- Game weather: 43 °F (6 °C) (Rain)
- Game attendance: 66,124
- Referee: Pete Morelli
- TV announcers (Fox): Kenny Albert, Daryl Johnston and Tony Siragusa
- Recap

Game information

First quarter

- No scoring plays

Second quarter

- WAS – Logan Paulsen 1-yard pass from Donovan McNabb (Graham Gano kick), Redskins 7–0, Drive: 8 plays, 54 yards, 4:26.
- TB – Connor Barth 25-yard field goal, Redskins 7–3, Drive: 5 plays,68 yards, 2:29.
- WAS – Graham Gano 25-yard field goal, Redskins 10–3, Drive: 6 plays, 53 yards, 2:12.

Third quarter

- TB – Connor Barth 44-yard field goal, Redskins 10–6, Drive: 4 plays, 8 yards, 3:12.
- TB – Connor Barth 35-yard field goal, Redskins 10–9, Drive: 10 plays, 44 yards, 5:29.

Fourth quarter

- TB – Kellen Winslow 41-yard pass from Josh Freeman (Josh Freeman run), Buccaneers 17–10, Drive: 7 plays, 80 yards, 3:35.
- WAS – Santana Moss 6-yard pass from Donovan McNabb (kick aborted), Buccaneers 17–16, Drive: 13 plays, 75 yards, 3:38.

Top passers

- TB – Josh Freeman – 15/25, 266 yards, 1 touchdown
- WAS – Donovan McNabb – 22/35, 228 yards, 2 touchdowns

Top rushers

- TB – LeGarrette Blount – 15 rushes, 68 yards
- WAS – Ryan Torain – 24 rushes, 172 yards

Top receivers

- TB – Arrelious Benn – 4 receptions, 122 yards
- WAS – Santana Moss – 7 receptions, 82 yards, 1 touchdown

Top tacklers

- TB – Ronde Barber – 5 tackles, 5 assists
- WAS – London Fletcher – 8 tackles, 3 assists

Tampa Bay faced Washington, on a cold, rainy afternoon. The wet conditions saw Redskins kicker Graham Gano miss two field goals early. One hit the upright, and the second sailed wide left. Despite Ryan Torain already having rushed for 133 yards to that point, the score still remained 0–0.

On the Buccaneers next possession, LeGarrette Blount fumbled away the ball, which led to a Washington score. Donovan McNabb completed a touchdown pass to Logan Paulsen, and the Redskins took the lead 7–0. On the next play, Josh Freeman completed a 64-yard pass to Arrelious Benn, which led to a field goal, and the game went to halftime with Washington leading 10–3.

Connor Barth scored field goals on Tampa Bay's first two possessions of the second half. At the end of the third quarter, Washington clung to a 10–9 lead.

In the fourth quarter, Freeman drove the Buccaneers 79 yards to the Washington 1-yard line. After a 43-yard pass to Benn, which gave them 1st & Goal at the 1-yard line, Freeman fumbled away the ball and Washington recovered. However, Washington failed to score on their next two drives. With less than 4 minutes left, Tampa Bay took the lead 17–10 when Freeman threw a touchdown pass to Kellen Winslow II, then rushed in himself for the two-point conversion.

In the final minutes, Donovan McNabb drove the Redskins 75 yards for a potential game-tying score. McNabb threw a touchdown pass to Santana Moss with 9 seconds left in regulation. On the extra point try, the snap sailed over the head of holder Hunter Smith, and the attempt failed, giving the Buccaneers the victory by a score of 17–16.

=== Week 15: vs. Detroit Lions ===
Week 15: Detroit Lions vs Tampa Bay Buccaneers – Game summary

Quarter	1	2	3	4	OT	Total
Lions	7	3	7	3	3	23
Buccaneers	0	14	0	6	0	20

at Raymond James Stadium, Tampa, Florida

- Date: December 19
- Game time: 1:00 p.m. EST
- Game weather: 54 °F (12 °C), Cloudy
- Game attendance: 47,692
- Referee: Terry McAulay
- TV announcers (Fox): Dick Stockton & Charles Davis (blacked out locally)
- Recap

Game information

First quarter

- DET – Nate Burleson 10-yard pass from Drew Stanton (Dave Rayner kick), Lions 7–0, Drive: 7 plays, 68 yards, 3:50.

Second quarter

- TB – Mike Williams 24-yard pass from Josh Freeman (Connor Barth kick), Tied 7–7, Drive: 8 plays, 60 yards, 4:37.
- TB – LeGarrette Blount 39-yard run (Connor Barth kick), Buccaneers 14–7, Drive: 8 plays, 77 yards, 4:45.
- DET – Dave Rayner 41-yard field goal, Buccaneers 14–10, Drive: 10 plays, 61 yards, 2:46.

Third quarter

- DET – Maurice Morris 10-yard run (Dave Rayner kick), Lions 17–14, Drive: 9 plays, 58 yards, 4:44.

Fourth quarter

- TB – Connor Barth 30-yard field goal, Tied 17–17, Drive: 15 plays, 67 yards, 7:05.
- TB – Connor Barth 26-yard field goal, Buccaneers 20–17, Drive: 11 plays, 57 yards, 4:09.
- DET – Dave Rayner 28-yard field goal, Tied 20–20, Drive: 10 plays, 58 yards, 1:39.

Overtime

- DET – Dave Rayner 34-yard field goal, Lions 23–20, Drive: 9 plays, 63 yards, 5:09.

Top passers

- DET – Drew Stanton – 23/37, 252 yards, 1 touchdown
- TB – Josh Freeman – 21/32, 251 yards, 1 touchdown

Top rushers

- DET – Maurice Morris – 15 rushes, 109 yards, 1 touchdown
- TB – LeGarrette Blount – 15 rushes, 110 yards, 1 touchdown

Top receivers

- DET – Calvin Johnson – 10 receptions, 152 yards
- TB – Mike Williams – 6 receptions, 96 yards, 1 touchdown

Top tacklers

- DET – DeAndre Levy – 11 tackles
- TB – Ronde Barber – 9 tackles

Tampa Bay trailed Detroit 7–0 after the first quarter. The Buccaneers rallied in the second quarter, as Josh Freeman completed a 24-yard touchdown pass to Mike Williams, followed by 39-yard touchdown run by LeGarrette Blount.

In the fourth quarter, Tampa Bay trailed 17–14. Freeman drove the Buccaneers to the Detroit 1-yard line. Kellen Winslow caught a touchdown pass, but it was nullified by an offensive pass interference penalty, and the Buccaneers settled for a field goal and a 17–17 tie. Tampa Bay took a 20–17 lead with 1:44 remaining in regulation. However, Detroit drove down the field, and Dave Rayner kicked a field goal for Detroit, and tied the game as time expired. Detroit won the coin toss in overtime, and Rayner kicked the game-winning field goal on the first possession.

Had the Buccaneers won (or tied) this game, they would have qualified for the playoffs and denied the eventual Super Bowl XLV champion Green Bay Packers a postseason berth.

=== Week 16: vs. Seattle Seahawks ===
Week 16: Seattle Seahawks vs Tampa Bay Buccaneers – Game summary

Quarter	1	2	3	4	Total
Seahawks	7	0	0	8	15
Buccaneers	3	14	14	7	38

at Raymond James Stadium, Tampa, Florida

- Date: December 26
- Game time: 4:15 p.m. EST
- Game weather: 49 °F (9 °C) (Cloudy)
- Game attendance: 46,576
- Referee: Clete Blakeman
- TV announcers (Fox): Thom Brennaman and Brian Billick (blacked out locally)
- Recap

Game information

First quarter

- SEA – Matt Hasselbeck 1-yard run (Olindo Mare kick), Seahawks 7–0, Drive: 11 plays, 62 yards, 5:53.
- TB – Connor Barth 46-yard field goal, Seahawks 7–3, Drive: 4 plays, −11 yards, 2:25.

Second quarter

- TB – Kellen Winslow 10-yard pass from Josh Freeman (Connor Barth kick), Buccaneers 10–7, Drive: 6 plays, 52 yards, 2:27.
- TB – Mike Williams 10-yard pass from Josh Freeman (Connor Barth kick), Buccaneers 17–7, Drive: 6 plays, 52 yards, 2:27.

Third quarter

- TB – Kellen Winslow 21-yard pass from Josh Freeman (Connor Barth kick), Buccaneers 24–7, Drive: 10 plays, 98 yards, 6:50.
- TB – Mike Williams 7-yard pass from Josh Freeman (Connor Barth kick), Buccaneers 31–7, Drive: 3 plays, 56 yards, 1:44.

Fourth quarter

- SEA – Leon Washington 16-yard run (Charlie Whitehurst – Ben Obomanu pass), Buccaneers 31–15, Drive: 11 plays, 54 yards, 6:14.
- TB – Maurice Stovall 2-yard pass from Josh Freeman (Connor Barth kick), Buccaneers 38–15, Drive: 4 plays, 72 yards, 2:18.

Top passers

- SEA – Charlie Whitehurst – 11/18, 66 yards
- TB – Josh Freeman – 21/26, 237 yards, 5 touchdowns

Top rushers

- SEA – Marshawn Lynch – 14 rushes, 53 yards
- TB – LeGarrette Blount – 18 rushes, 164 yards

Top receivers

- SEA – John Carlson – 3 receptions, 27 yards
- TB – Kellen Winslow – 7 receptions, 98 yards, 2 touchdowns

Top tacklers

- SEA – Lofa Tatupu – 8 tackles, 2 assists, 1.0 sack, 1 forced fumble
- TB – Geno Hayes – 8 tackles, 1 assist, 2.0 sacks

Josh Freeman threw for 237 yards and threw five touchdown passes, tying a franchise record, as Tampa Bay routed Seattle 38–15.

In the first quarter, Matt Hasselbeck scrambled for a 1-yard touchdown to give Seattle a 7–0 lead. However, Hasselbeck suffered a muscle strain on the play, and was sidelined for the remainder of the game. Backup quarterback Charlie Whitehurst was forced to take over for Seattle.

Micheal Spurlock returned the ensuing kickoff 79 yards to the Seattle 17-yard line, setting up a Connor Barth field goal. Tampa Bay scored 31 unanswered points, including two touchdown passes apiece from Freeman to Kellen Winslow and Mike Williams.

=== Week 17: at New Orleans Saints ===
Week 17: Tampa Bay Buccaneers at New Orleans Saints – Game summary

Quarter	1	2	3	4	Total
Buccaneers	3	7	10	3	23
Saints	7	0	3	3	13

at Louisiana Superdome, New Orleans, Louisiana

- Date: January 2
- Game time: 12:00 p.m. CST
- Game weather: None (dome stadium)
- Referee: Gene Steratore
- TV announcers (Fox): Thom Brennaman and Brian Billick

Game information

First quarter

- TB – Connor Barth 43-yard field goal, Buccaneers 3–0, Drive: 9 plays, 51 yards, 5:02.
- NO – Jimmy Graham 9-yard pass from Drew Brees (Garrett Hartley kick), Saints 7–3, Drive: 13 plays, 73 yards, 5:17.

Second quarter

- TB – Dezmon Briscoe 2-yard pass from Josh Freeman (Connor Barth kick), Buccaneers 10–7, Drive: 11 plays, 91 yards, 5:41.

Third quarter

- NO – Garrett Hartley 45-yard field goal, Tied 10–10, Drive: 10 plays, 43 yards, 4:30.
- TB – Connor Barth 32-yard field goal, Buccaneers 13–10, Drive: 5 plays, 18 yards, 2:29.
- TB – Mike Williams 18-yard pass from Josh Freeman (Connor Barth kick), Buccaneers 20–10, Drive 5 plays, 38 yards, 3:02.

Fourth quarter

- NO – Garrett Hartley 38-yard field goal, Buccaneers 20–13, Drive: 12 plays, 66 yards, 5:52.
- TB – Connor Barth 48-yard field goal, Buccaneers 23–13, Drive: 7 plays, 60 yards, 3:10.

Top passers

- TB – Josh Freeman – 21/26, 255 yards, 2 touchdowns
- NO – Drew Brees – 22/38, 196 yards, 1 touchdown, 1 interception

Top rushers

- TB – LeGarrette Blount – 19 rushes, 66 yards
- NO – Reggie Bush – 9 rushes, 70 yards

Top receivers

- TB – Dezmon Briscoe – 4 receptions, 65 yards, 1 touchdown
- NO – Adrian Arrington – 7 receptions, 79 yards

Top tacklers

- TB – Geno Hayes – 7 tackles, 1 assist, 1.0 sack
- NO – Scott Shanle – 7 tackles, 2 assists

Looking to secure a playoff spot, the Buccaneers played at New Orleans. Trailing 3–7 in the second quarter, the Buccaneers took the lead with Josh Freeman completing a 2-yard touchdown pass to Dezmon Briscoe. The Saints tied the game after Garrett Hartley's 45-yard field goal in the third quarter. Tampa Bay re-took the lead after another field goal, then stretched their lead with Freeman's second touchdown pass of the day. The Saints tried to narrow the gap with Hartley making a 38-yard field goal, but the Buccaneers held on to win.

With the win, the Buccaneers finished with a 10–6 record, but the Green Bay Packers victory over the Chicago Bears later that day gave them the 6th seed due to a strength of victory tie-breaker and eliminated the Buccaneers from playoff contention. This was also tied with the Giants but were eliminated because of Green Bay's tie breaker with them and the Giants.

== Awards ==
- Week 5: Josh Freeman – NFC Offensive Player of the Week
- Week 8: Aqib Talib – NFC Defensive Player of the Week
- Week 16: Josh Freeman – FedEx Air Player of the Week
- Week 16: LeGarrette Blount – FedEx Ground Player of the Week
- Week 17: Josh Freeman – FedEx Air Player of the Week
- Week 17: Josh Freeman – NFC Offensive Player of the Week
- NFL Rookie of the Month For December: LeGarrette Blount

== Television blackouts ==
All of the Tampa Bay Buccaneers home games (preseason and regular season) have been blacked out on local television because the games failed to sell out prior to 72 hours before kickoff. The affiliates affected include WTVT, WTSP, and WFLA (preseason) in the Tampa/St. Pete market, as well as WOFL, WKMG and WFTV (preseason) in the Orlando market. Despite their improvement and being in the playoff hunt, Tampa Bay Buccaneers became the first NFL team of the 2010 season to not sell out a single home game.

The Week 1 blackout against Cleveland marked the first regular season game at Raymond James Stadium that failed to sell out. The last TV blackout occurred in 1997.
