= Mark Dominik =

American football executive

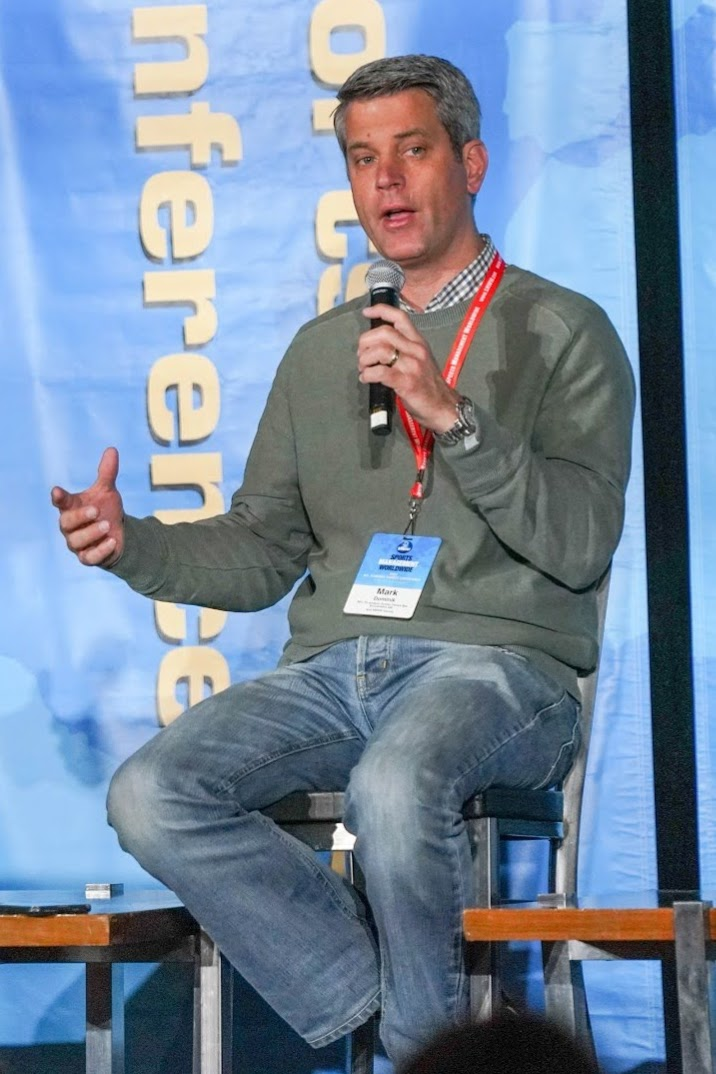
- Dominik in 2020

Personal information
- Born: March 9, 1971 (age 55); St. Cloud, Minnesota, U.S.

Career information
- College: Kansas

Career history
- Kansas City Chiefs (1994-1995) Personnel assistant; Tampa Bay Buccaneers (1995–1996) Pro personnel assistant; Tampa Bay Buccaneers (1997-1999) Pro scout; Tampa Bay Buccaneers (2000) Coordinator of pro personnel; Tampa Bay Buccaneers (2001-2008) Director of pro personnel; Tampa Bay Buccaneers (2009–2013) General manager

Awards and highlights
- Super Bowl champion (XXXVII)

Mark Dominik (born March 9, 1971) is an American former professional football executive and scout, most notably for the Tampa Bay Buccaneers of the National Football League (NFL), where he worked from 1995 to 2013. Dominik joined the Tampa Bay Buccaneers after spending a year and a half working as an assistant in both the college and pro personnel departments of the Kansas City Chiefs.

In 1995, Dominik was hired as a pro personnel assistant by the Buccaneers. He moved up to pro scout, coordinator of pro personnel, and director of pro personnel from 1997 to 2008. Dominik succeeded Bruce Allen as general manager on January 17, 2009. Dominik held the position of general manager from 2009 through the 2013 season. His record as Bucs GM was 28-52. Dominik during his tenure as general manager with the Tampa Bay Buccaneers was active in the military community. He was a finalist in the NFL's salute to service award in 2012. Dominik also was formerly an analyst for ESPN where he was on SportsCenter, NFL Insiders, ESPN Radio and NFL Live. Dominik is a host on Sirius XM NFL Radio. Born in St. Cloud, Minnesota, Dominik holds a bachelor of science degree in sports management from the University of Kansas. Currently he is a partner at X10 Capital and a "Football GM and Scouting" instructor for the online sports-career training school Sports Management Worldwide.

== Front office ==
As director of pro personnel, Dominik's duties included overseeing the scouting, recruiting and signing efforts of all NFL players, while also monitoring NFL transactions and overseeing player tryouts. He was also in charge of the pro personnel department's evaluation of players in all other professional football leagues, including the Canadian Football League and the Arena Football League, while being responsible for the negotiation and signing of contracts for several free agents and NFL draft signings. Prior to the start of the 2001 season, Dominik began the first of his eight years as director of pro personnel. In 2002, the franchise won its first world championship in Super Bowl XXXVII, a victory over the Oakland Raiders.

== General manager ==
Dominik headed up five draft classes while serving as the club's general manager. During his tenure the Tampa Bay Buccaneers had only one winning season (2010). The team compiled a record of 28-52 while he was General Manager. Dominik drafted 36 players while serving as the club's general manager, 20 (56%) of whom signed an extension, which ranks top five among GMs during that period. 14 of the 36 players (39%) played more than 8 or more seasons in the NFL, which ranks top 3 among GMs during that time period.

- Gerald McCoy (defensive tackle, 2010–present) 11-year career, five-time Pro Bowl selection, three-time 1st Team All-Pro
- Roy Miller (defensive tackle, 2009–2017) 9-year starter
- Mark Barron (linebacker and safety, 2012–2020) 9-year career, 2012 All-Rookie Team
- Erik Lorig (fullback, 2010–2016) 7-year career
- Dekoda Watson (linebacker, 2010–2019) 9-year career
- Mason Foster (linebacker, 2011–2018) 8-year career
- Mike Williams (wide receiver, 2010–2016) 6-year career, 2010 All-Rookie Team
- E.J. Biggers (cornerback, 2009–2016) 8-year career
- Lavonte David (linebacker, 2012–present) 13-year career, Pro Bowl, 1st Team All Pro, 2012 All-Rookie Team
- Luke Stocker (tight end, 2011–2021) 11-year career
- Steven Means (linebacker, 2013–2022) 10-year career
- Najee Goode (linebacker, 2012–2020) 9-year career
- Josh Freeman (quarterback, 2009–2015) 6-year career
- William Gholston (defensive end, 2013–present) 12-year career
- Adrian Clayborn (defensive end, 2011–2020) 10-year career
- Akeem Spence (defensive tackle, 2013–2022) 10-year career
- Keith Tandy (defensive back, 2012–2018) 7-year career
- Arrelious Benn (wide receiver, 2010–2017) 8-year career
- Mike Glennon (quarterback, 2013–2022) 10-year career
- Doug Martin (running back, 2012–2018) 7-year career, two-time Pro Bowl selection, 2012 All-Rookie Team

17 draft picks signed multi-year extensions after their rookie deals expired: Miller, Biggers, Lorig, Watson, Williams, Benn, McCoy, Stocker, Foster, Clayborn, Tandy, David, Martin, Barron, Gholston, Spence and Glennon.

Signed or extended contracts of Pro Bowl players:

- Vincent Jackson 3× Pro Bowl
- Davin Joseph 2× Pro Bowl
- Donald Penn 2× Pro Bowl
- Darrelle Revis 7× Pro Bowl
- Dashon Goldson 2× Pro Bowl

Dominik was fired in 2013, along with head coach Greg Schiano, after the team finished the season with a 4-12 record.
