= Chris Mosley =

American football coach

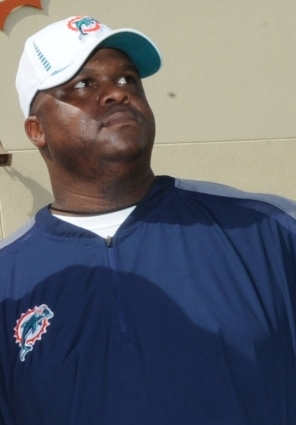
- Mosley in 2012

Bluffton Beavers
- Title: Offensive coordinator and offensive line

Career information
- College: Washington & Jefferson

Career history
- Washington & Jefferson (2004) Offensive line coach; Akron (2005) Graduate assistant; Villanova (2006) Defensive backs coach; Boston College (2007) Offensive line coach; Princeton (2008) Tight ends coach; Tampa Bay Buccaneers (2009) Defensive line coach; Tampa Bay Buccaneers (2010) Offensive line coach; Saint Anselm (2011) Offensive line coach; Miami Dolphins (2012–2013) Assistant offensive line coach

Chris Mosley is an American football coach who last served as an assistant offensive line coach with the Miami Dolphins of the National Football League (NFL). He has been the team's assistant offensive line coach since 2012.

He was previously offensive line coach for the Saint Anselm Hawks, he was also video coordinator and director of football operations for the team. For the Tampa Bay Buccaneers, he was a defensive line assistant in 2010 and offensive line assistant in 2009. He was tight ends coach for Princeton Tigers in 2008; offensive line assistant for Boston College Eagles in 2007; defensive backs coach for the Villanova Wildcats in 2006. As a graduate assistant for the Akron Zips in 2005, he coached the tackles and tight ends. In 2004, he was offensive line coach and Director of Strength and Conditioning for Washington & Jefferson College.

He attended Southeast Missouri State University for two years before attending Washington & Jefferson College, graduating with a degree in sociology in 2001. A running back, he played football at both schools. In 2000 at Washington & Jefferson, he was named to the All-Presidents' Athletic Conference team in 2000.

On November 8, 2013, Mosley and the Miami Dolphins agreed to part ways.
