= Marc Dile =

American gridiron football player (born 1986)

Profile
- Position: Guard/Tackle

Personal information
- Born: May 5, 1986 (age 40); Orlando, Florida, U.S.
- Listed height: 6 ft 4 in (1.93 m)
- Listed weight: 275 lb (125 kg)

Career information
- High school: Miami (FL) Edison
- College: South Florida
- NFL draft: 2009: undrafted

Career history
- Tampa Bay Buccaneers (2009–2010)*; Buffalo Bills (2010)*; Tampa Bay Buccaneers (2010–2011)*; Orlando Predators (2012–2015); Hamilton Tiger-Cats (2012–2014); Winnipeg Blue Bombers (2015)*
- * Offseason or practice squad member only
- Stats at Pro Football Reference
- Stats at CFL.ca (archive)

Marc Dile (born May 5, 1986) is an American former professional football offensive lineman. He was signed by the Tampa Bay Buccaneers as an undrafted free agent in 2009. He played college football at South Florida.

After surviving final cuts at the end of training camp, Dile remained on the Buccaneers' roster for 5 weeks. However, he was declared inactive by the team for all games during this portion of the season. Following the fifth game of the season, Dile was waived by the team for purposes of transferring him to their Practice Squad, where he remained for the rest of the season. He was cut on September 3, 2011. On June 22, 2015, he was activated by the Orlando Predators.

== Biography ==
Marc Dile is born to parents of Haitian descent.
