= Vladimir Richard =

American football player (born 1987)

No. 56
- Position: Offensive lineman

Personal information
- Born: March 15, 1987 (age 39); Sunrise, Florida, U.S.
- Listed height: 6 ft 4 in (1.93 m)
- Listed weight: 310 lb (141 kg)

Career information
- College: Tennessee
- NFL draft: 2010: undrafted

Career history
- Tampa Bay Buccaneers (2010)*; Spokane Shock (2011); Jacksonville Sharks (2011–2012)
- * Offseason or practice squad member only

Awards and highlights
- ArenaBowl champion (2011)
- Stats at ArenaFan.com

Vladimir Richard (born March 15, 1987) is an American former professional football player who was an offensive lineman in the Arena Football League (AFL). He played college football for the Tennessee Volunteers and was signed as a free agent by the Tampa Bay Buccaneers of the National Football League (NFL) in 2010.
