= Derek Hardman =

American football player (born 1986)

No. 73, 68
- Position: Guard

Personal information
- Born: September 13, 1986 (age 40); Spencer, West Virginia, U.S.
- Listed height: 6 ft 6 in (1.98 m)
- Listed weight: 300 lb (136 kg)

Career information
- High school: Roane County (Spencer)
- College: Eastern Kentucky
- NFL draft: 2010: undrafted

Career history
- Tampa Bay Buccaneers (2010−2012); Detroit Lions (2013)*
- * Offseason or practice squad member only

Career NFL statistics
- Games played: 15
- Games started: 4
- Stats at Pro Football Reference

Derek Hardman (born September 13, 1986) is an American former professional football player who was a guard in the National Football League (NFL). He played college football for the Eastern Kentucky Colonels and was signed by the Tampa Bay Buccaneers as an undrafted free agent in 2010.

== Professional career ==
=== Tampa Bay Buccaneers ===
On April 26, 2010, Hardman was signed by the Tampa Bay Buccaneers as an undrafted free agent. On May 2, 2013, he was waived by the Buccaneers.

=== Detroit Lions ===
On May 3, 2013, Hardman was claimed off waivers by the Detroit Lions. On August 23, 2013, he was cut by the Lions.
