= Rendrick Taylor =

American football player (born 1987)

No. 20
- Position: Fullback

Personal information
- Born: April 3, 1987 (age 39); Bennettsville, South Carolina, U.S.
- Listed height: 6 ft 2 in (1.88 m)
- Listed weight: 260 lb (118 kg)

Career information
- High school: Marlboro County
- College: Clemson
- NFL draft: 2010: undrafted

Career history
- Tampa Bay Buccaneers (2010)*; Omaha Nighthawks (2010); Tampa Bay Buccaneers (2010–2011)*; Jacksonville Sharks (2012–2013)
- * Offseason or practice squad member only

Career AFL statistics
- Rushing attempts: 104
- Rushing yards: 388
- Rushing touchdowns: 15
- Receiving yards: 50
- Receiving touchdowns: 1
- Stats at ArenaFan.com
- Stats at Pro Football Reference

Rendrick Taylor (born April 3, 1987) is an American former professional football fullback. He played college football at Clemson University. He was signed as an undrafted free agent by the Tampa Bay Buccaneers in 2010.
