= Will Barker (American football) =

American football player (born 1987)

No. 61
- Position: Offensive tackle

Personal information
- Born: July 3, 1987 (age 39); Bryn Mawr, Pennsylvania, U.S.
- Listed height: 6 ft 7 in (2.01 m)
- Listed weight: 320 lb (145 kg)

Career information
- College: Virginia
- NFL draft: 2010: undrafted

Career history
- Dallas Cowboys (2010)*; Tampa Bay Buccaneers (2010–2011); Miami Dolphins (2011)
- * Offseason or practice squad member only

Career NFL statistics
- Games played: 3
- Stats at Pro Football Reference

William Sherrerd Barker (born July 3, 1987) is an American former professional football player who was an offensive tackle in the National Football League (NFL). He was signed by the Dallas Cowboys as an undrafted free agent in 2010. He played college football for the Virginia Cavaliers.

== Early life ==
Barker grew up in Bryn Mawr, Pennsylvania, a suburban community outside of Philadelphia, with his two sisters, Lila and Lexie. He attended The Haverford School. Despite focusing on football, he also excelled in lacrosse where he started on defense for Haverford's nationally ranked team.

== College career ==
Barker played at the University of Virginia. He earned Second-team Freshman All-American during his freshman season by the Sporting News. He was named team captain as a senior.

== Professional career ==
=== Dallas Cowboys ===
After going undrafted in the 2010 NFL draft, Barker signed as a free agent with the Dallas Cowboys on April 24, 2010.

=== Tampa Bay Buccaneers ===
Barker signed to Tampa Bay's practice squad after being cut by Dallas, and was activated later in the season. He was waived during final cuts on September 3, 2011, and re-signed to the Buccaneers' practice squad two days later.

=== Miami Dolphins ===
Barker was signed off the Buccaneers' practice squad on October 5, 2011. He was released by the Dolphins on September 1, 2012.
