= Michael Palmer (Canadian football) =

Canadian football player (born 1980)

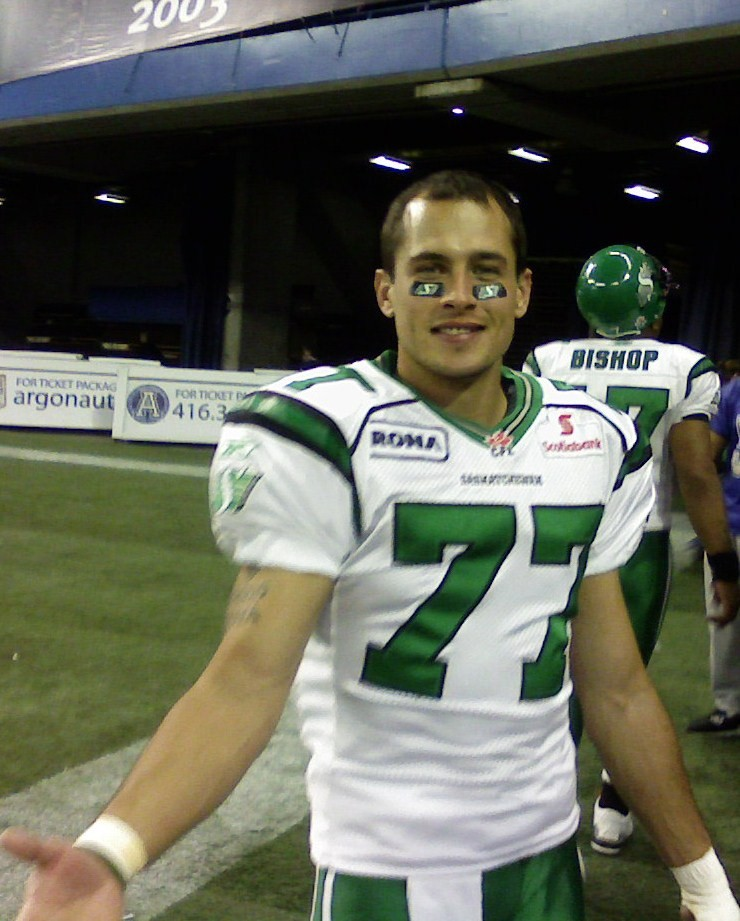
- Palmer with the Saskatchewan Roughriders in 2008

Profile
- Position: Wide receiver

Personal information
- Born: October 30, 1980 (age 46); Richmond, British Columbia, Canada

Career information
- University: Guelph
- CFL draft: 2003: 6th round, 48th overall pick

Career history
- 2003–2007: Toronto Argonauts
- 2007–2008: Saskatchewan Roughriders

Awards and highlights
- 2× Grey Cup champion (2004, 2007)
- Stats at CFL.ca

Michael Palmer (born October 31, 1980) is a Canadian former professional football wide receiver who played in the Canadian Football League (CFL) with the Toronto Argonauts and Saskatchewan Roughriders. He has won two Grey Cups in 2004 and 2007. He went to school at Crestwicke Christian Academy and University of Guelph. Palmer is the son of former BC Lions linebacker Peter Palmer and former Canadian Olympic gymnast Jennifer Diachun-Palmer.
