= E. J. Biggers =

American football player (born 1987)

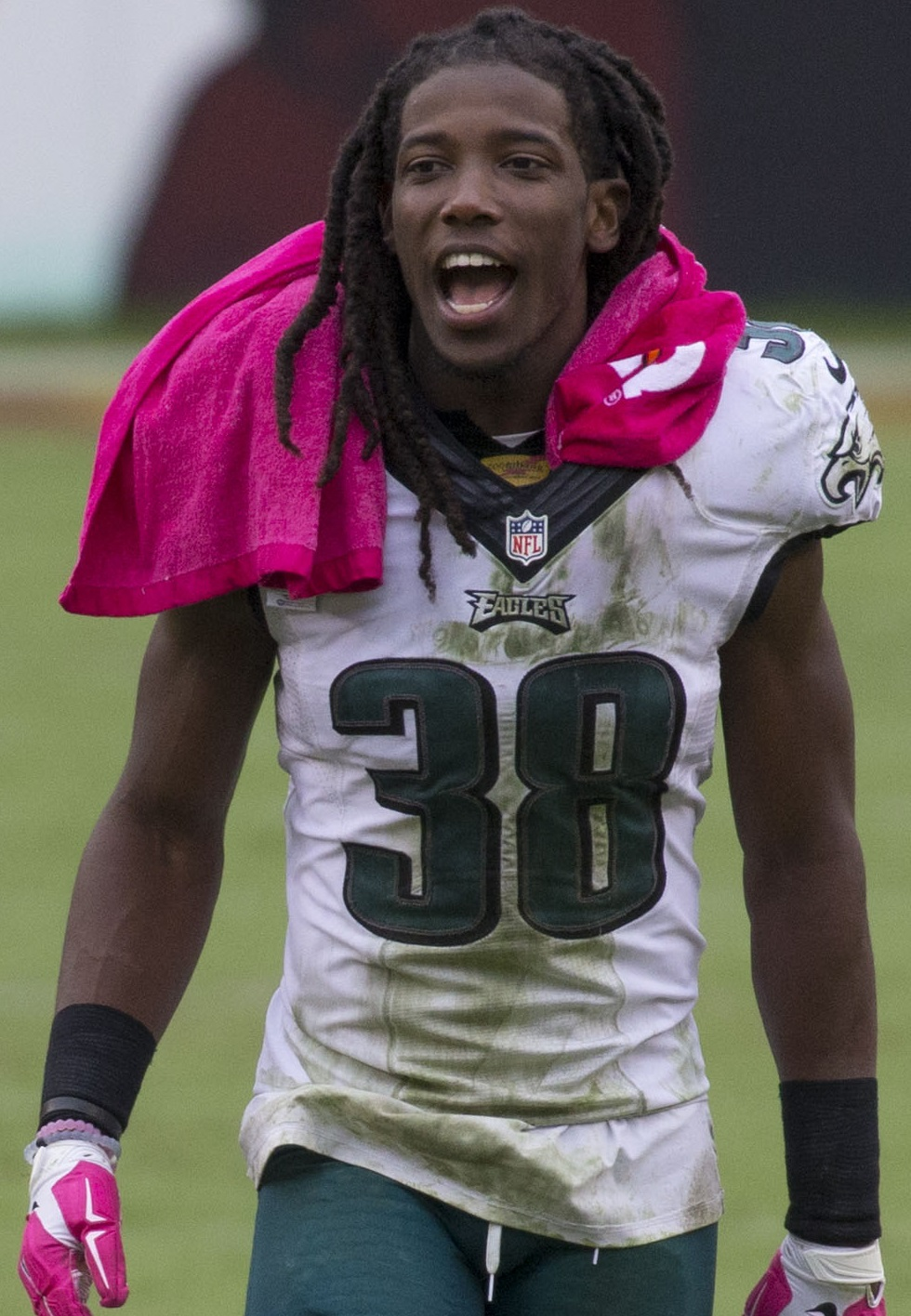
- Biggers with the Philadelphia Eagles in 2015

No. 31, 30, 38
- Position: Cornerback

Personal information
- Born: June 13, 1987 (age 39); Miami, Florida, U.S.
- Listed height: 6 ft 0 in (1.83 m)
- Listed weight: 170 lb (77 kg)

Career information
- High school: North Miami Beach (North Miami Beach, Florida)
- College: Western Michigan
- NFL draft: 2009: 7th round, 217th overall pick

Career history
- Tampa Bay Buccaneers (2009–2012); Washington Redskins (2013–2014); Philadelphia Eagles (2015); New England Patriots (2016)*
- * Offseason or practice squad member only

Career NFL statistics
- Total tackles: 279
- Sacks: 1
- Forced fumbles: 2
- Pass deflections: 41
- Interceptions: 4
- Stats at Pro Football Reference

Edjaun Sinclair "E. J." Biggers (born June 13, 1987) is an American former professional football player who was a cornerback in the National Football League (NFL). He played college football for the Western Michigan Broncos, and was selected by the Tampa Bay Buccaneers in the seventh round of the 2009 NFL draft. Biggers also played for the Washington Redskins and Philadelphia Eagles.

== Early life ==
Biggers played both quarterback and cornerback, and was a three-year starter for the North Miami Beach Senior High School Chargers football team. As a senior, he was named Dade County Player of the Year. Despite this honor and his obvious athletic talent, he was not highly recruited in his home state of Florida. Biggers was offered scholarships from Iowa, Kansas, Ohio State, and Penn State before ultimately deciding to attend Western Michigan.

College recruiting
Name	Hometown	School	Height	Weight	40^{‡}	Commit date
E. J. Biggers; CB	North Miami Beach, FL	North Miami Beach HS	5 ft 11 in (1.80 m)	163 lb (74 kg)	4.65	Feb 5, 2005
E. J. Biggers; CB	Recruit ratings: Scout: Rivals:					
Overall recruit ranking: Scout: NR Rivals: 30 (Athlete), 67 (FL)
Note: In many cases, Scout, Rivals, 247Sports, On3, and ESPN may conflict in their listings of height and weight.; In these cases, the average was taken. ESPN grades are on a 100-point scale.; Sources: "Western Michigan Football Commitments". Rivals.; "2005 Western Michigan Football Commits". Scout.; "Scout.com Team Recruiting Rankings". Scout.; "2005 Team Ranking". Rivals.com.

== College career ==
As a true freshman in 2005, Biggers appeared in nine games for Western Michigan and started three. In his sophomore season, he started all 12 of the Broncos' games, and recorded interceptions in three consecutive games. At the end of the season, playing in his first bowl game (against the Cincinnati Bearcats in the inaugural International Bowl), Biggers played some snaps on offense, and in the second half on a double reverse trick play, he threw his first career pass, which went for a 76-yard touchdown.

Biggers would go on to start all 25 games for the Broncos in his junior and senior years. Despite over three full seasons as a starter and being named to the All-MAC team his senior year, he did not receive an invitation to the NFL Scouting Combine. His impressive showing at Western Michigan's pro day (including a 4.34 in the 40-yard dash and a 36-inch vertical jump) caught the attention of NFL scouts.

== Professional career ==
=== Tampa Bay Buccaneers ===
Biggers was selected with the eighth pick in the seventh round of the 2009 NFL draft by the Tampa Bay Buccaneers. Biggers had a promising training camp, but injured his shoulder in practice during the first week of the regular season, and was placed on injured reserve for the remainder of the year.

Biggers made his NFL debut in 2010 when he started in Tampa's Week 1 matchup against the Cleveland Browns for a suspended Aqib Talib. Biggers not only recorded his first tackle in the NFL (and finished the game with six), but also got his first NFL interception against the Browns' veteran QB Jake Delhomme.

=== Washington Redskins ===
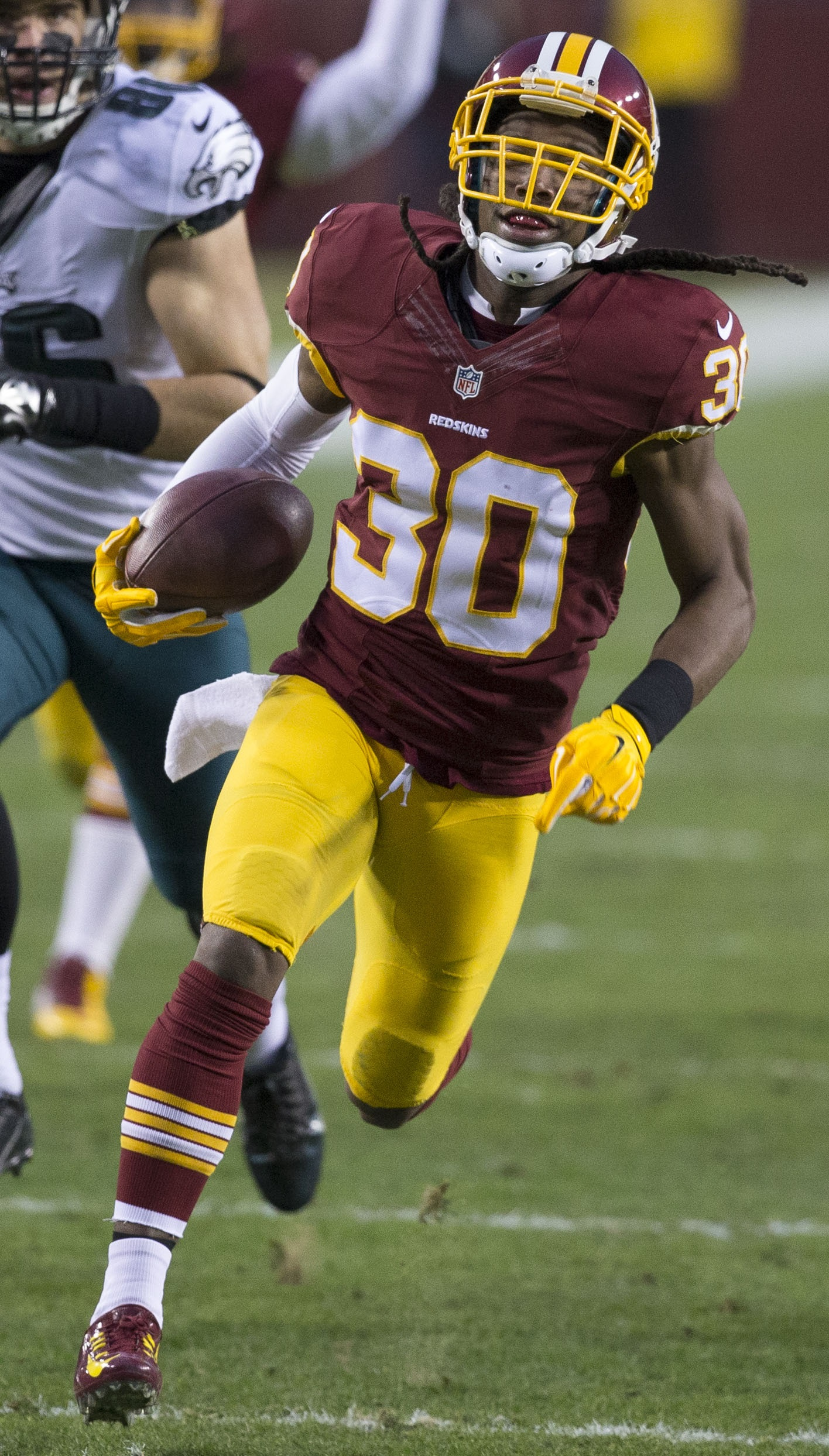
Biggers with the Washington Redskins in 2014

Biggers signed with the Washington Redskins on March 20, 2013, joining the team on a one-year, $1.5 million deal. The Redskins used him as both a corner and safety, Biggers never playing the latter in his professional career. He recorded his first interception with the Redskins in their Week 9 win against the San Diego Chargers. After the Week 11 game against the Philadelphia Eagles, he was fined $21,000 for a helmet-to-helmet hit on wide receiver DeSean Jackson.

=== Philadelphia Eagles ===
On April 7, 2015, the Philadelphia Eagles announced that they signed Biggers to a one-year deal.

=== New England Patriots ===
On March 29, 2016, the New England Patriots signed Biggers to a one-year deal.

On August 23, 2016, Biggers was released by the Patriots.

== NFL career statistics ==
Legend
**Bold**	Career high

Year	Team	Games		Tackles					Interceptions					Fumbles			
Year	Team	GP	GS	Cmb	Solo	Ast	Sck	TFL	Int	Yds	TD	Lng	PD	FF	FR	Yds	TD
2010	TAM	**16**	6	56	49	7	0.0	1	**1**	0	0	0	**11**	0	0	0	0
2011	TAM	**16**	6	**61**	**55**	6	0.0	0	**1**	0	0	0	10	0	0	0	0
2012	TAM	13	**12**	51	41	10	**1.0**	**2**	**1**	0	0	0	7	**2**	0	0	0
2013	WAS	**16**	5	35	23	**12**	0.0	1	**1**	**15**	0	**15**	2	0	0	0	0
2014	WAS	15	2	32	27	5	0.0	1	0	0	0	0	4	0	0	0	0
2015	PHI	**16**	3	44	36	8	0.0	0	0	0	0	0	7	0	0	0	0
Career		92	34	279	231	48	1.0	5	4	15	0	15	41	2	0	0	0
