= Mike Williams (wide receiver, born 1987) =

American football player (1987–2023)

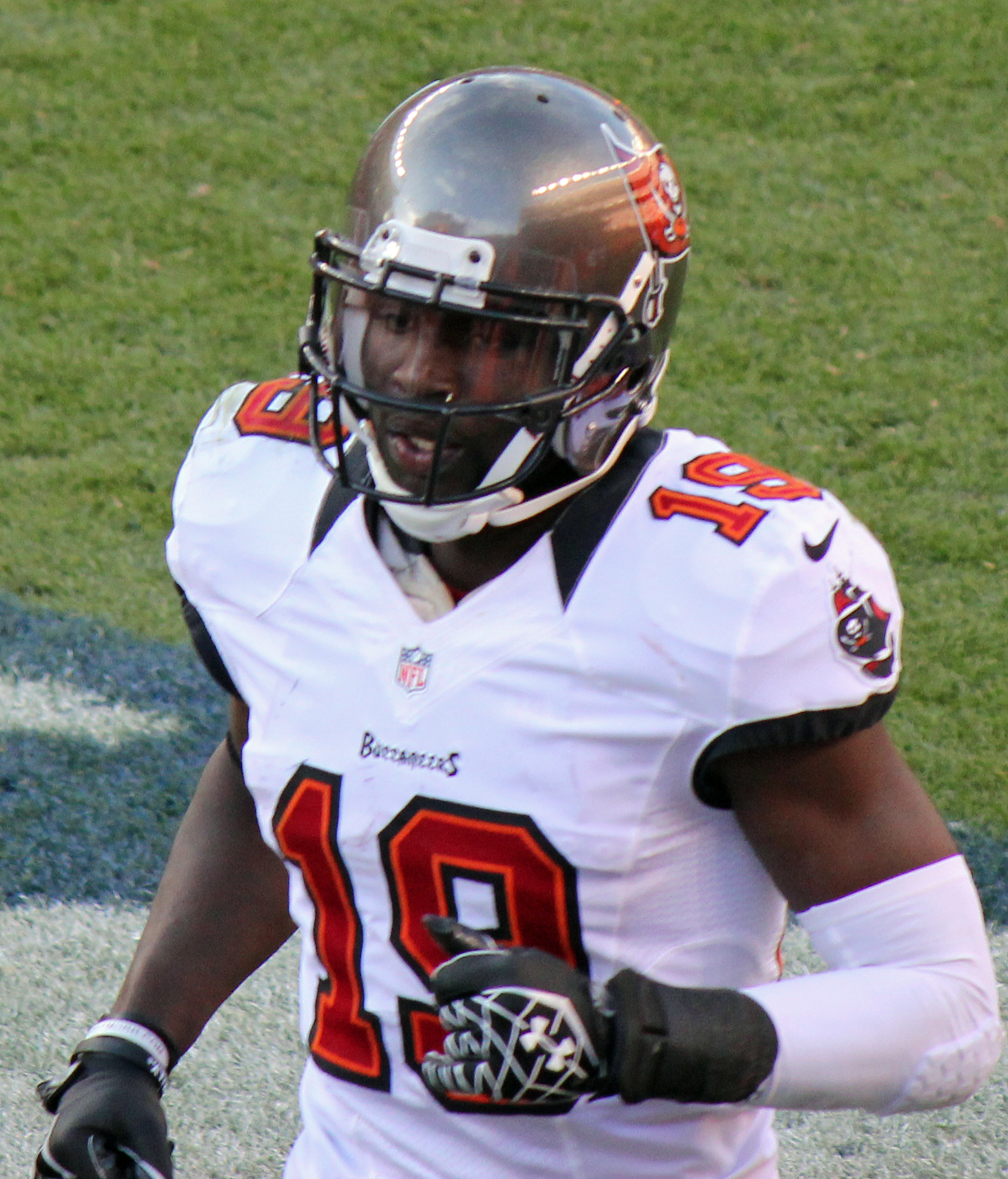
- Williams with the Tampa Bay Buccaneers in 2012

No. 19, 15
- Position: Wide receiver

Personal information
- Born: May 18, 1987; Buffalo, New York, U.S.
- Died: September 12, 2023 (aged 36); Tampa, Florida, U.S.
- Listed height: 6 ft 1 in (1.85 m)
- Listed weight: 212 lb (96 kg)

Career information
- High school: Riverside (Buffalo)
- College: Syracuse (2006–2009)
- NFL draft: 2010: 4th round, 101st overall pick

Career history
- Tampa Bay Buccaneers (2010–2013); Buffalo Bills (2014); Kansas City Chiefs (2016)*
- * Offseason or practice squad member only

Awards and highlights
- PFWA All-Rookie Team (2010); Second-team All-Big East (2007)

Career NFL statistics
- Receptions: 223
- Receiving yards: 3,089
- Receiving touchdowns: 26
- Stats at Pro Football Reference

Michael Anthony Williams (May 18, 1987 – September 12, 2023) was an American professional football player who was a wide receiver for five seasons in the National Football League (NFL). He played college football for the Syracuse Orange, and was selected by the Tampa Bay Buccaneers in the fourth round of the 2010 NFL draft. He also played in the NFL for the Buffalo Bills.

== Early life ==
Williams attended Riverside Institute of Technology. As a senior, he had 970 receiving yards and 15 touchdowns on offense and 35 tackles and two interceptions on defense.

== College career ==
As a true freshman at Syracuse in 2006, Williams made 24 receptions for a team-leading 461 yards and four touchdowns in 10 games. As a sophomore in 2007 Williams was an all-Big East second-team selection. He finished the season tying a school record with 60 receptions for 837 yards and 10 touchdowns in 12 games.

In June 2008, Williams was suspended for the 2008 season for academic reasons.

On November 3, 2009, Williams quit the team after he was involved in a car accident with teammates Antwon Bailey, Andrew Tiller and Torrey Ball. He finished the 2009 season with 49 receptions for 746 yards and six touchdowns in seven games.

== Professional career ==
Pre-draft measurables
Height	Weight	Arm length	Hand span	40-yard dash	10-yard split	20-yard split	20-yard shuttle	Three-cone drill	Vertical jump	Broad jump	Bench press
6 ft 1 1/2 in (1.87 m)	221 lb (100 kg)	32 1/2 in (0.83 m)	9 1/4 in (0.23 m)	4.53 s	1.53 s	2.63 s	4.19 s	6.90 s	39.5 in (1.00 m)	10 ft 0 in (3.05 m)	8 reps
All values from 2010 NFL Combine

=== Tampa Bay Buccaneers ===
Williams was selected by the Tampa Bay Buccaneers in the fourth round (101st overall) in the 2010 NFL draft. He was signed to a four-year contract on June 4, 2010.

On September 12, 2010, he made his NFL debut against the Cleveland Browns, making five receptions for 30 yards and a touchdown. In his first pro season, Williams became the first Buccaneer rookie to score a touchdown in back-to-back games since Carnell Williams in 2005. On October 31, 2010, Williams recorded his first career 100-yard receiving game at Arizona, finishing with 105 yards on four receptions and a touchdown.

Williams started all 16 games as a rookie and had 65 receptions for 964 yards and 11 touchdowns. His 11 touchdowns marked a new Buccaneers franchise record for most receiving touchdowns in a single season. After his rookie season, Williams finished second in voting for AP Offensive Rookie of the Year, and was a finalist for the NFL Pepsi Rookie of the Year. He was also named to The Sporting News NFL All-Rookie Team and PFW/PFWA All-Rookie Team and led all rookie receivers in the NFL in yardage (964), receptions (65) and touchdowns (11) in 2010. He was ranked 83rd by his fellow players on the NFL Top 100 Players of 2011.

In 2011, Williams caught 68 passes for 771 yards. Williams finished the 2012 season with a career-high in receiving yards with 996.

On July 24, 2013, it was reported that Williams had agreed to a new six-year, $40.25 million contract with the Buccaneers that would have kept him in Tampa Bay through the 2018 season. On October 28, the Bucs announced that they had placed Williams on injured reserve, ending his season and leaving the Buccaneers without one of their starting wideouts the rest of the way. Williams battled a hamstring injury for several weeks and finished the season with 22 catches for 216 yards and two touchdowns.

=== Buffalo Bills ===
On April 4, 2014, Williams was traded to the Buffalo Bills, his hometown team, for a 6th-round draft pick, just one season after signing a contract extension with the Buccaneers. During a week 4 game against the Houston Texans, Williams caught what would become his lone touchdown with the Bills, an 80-yard pass from EJ Manuel.

On October 13, 2014, it was reported that Williams had asked the Bills for a trade. Williams was placed on the waived/injured list on December 8, 2014. He went unclaimed during the waiver process, and was placed on the Bills injured reserve list the next day. On December 22, 2014, Williams recovered from his calf injury and was released by the Bills.

Williams was suspended by the NFL for the first six weeks of the 2015 season on September 8, 2015, for an undisclosed issue.

=== Kansas City Chiefs ===
On April 25, 2016, Williams signed with the Kansas City Chiefs. On August 25, 2016, Williams was released by the Chiefs.

=== NFL career statistics ===
- **Bold** denotes career high

Year	Team	Games		Receiving					Rushing					Fumbles	
Year	Team	GP	GS	Rec	Yds	Avg	Lng	TD	Att	Yds	Avg	Lng	TD	Fum	Lost
2010	TB	16	16	**65**	964	14.8	58	**11**	0	0	0.0	0	0	3	2
2011	TB	16	15	**65**	771	11.9	42	3	**1**	**3**	**3.0**	**3**	0	2	2
2012	TB	16	16	63	**996**	15.8	65	9	0	0	0.0	0	0	**0**	**0**
2013	TB	6	5	22	216	9.8	28	2	0	0	0.0	0	0	**0**	**0**
2014	BUF	9	0	8	142	**17.8**	**80**	1	0	0	0.0	0	0	**0**	**0**
Total		63	52	223	3089	13.9	80	26	1	3	3.0	3	0	5	4

== Personal life ==
Williams had a daughter with Tierney Lyle, in addition to a son with another woman.

== Death ==
Williams worked in construction in the Tampa Bay area following his NFL career. On August 21, 2023, he was injured in a worksite accident in which a steel beam fell on his head. Though he initially returned home, he was admitted to St. Joseph's Hospital in Tampa the following day, with acute respiratory failure, cardiac arrest, and sepsis diagnosed at the time of his admission. He was later reported to be paralyzed in his right arm and from the waist down.

While Williams initially appeared to be faring better after surgery, his condition declined rapidly and he was placed in a medically induced coma. After the release of conflicting reports as to whether he had died or not, on September 6, Lyle reported that he was alive and on life support. By September 7, Lyle stated that Williams had been taken off life support, but was surviving and responsive. However, he died five days later on September 12, at the age of 36. The medical examiner's report concluded that Williams died from bacterial sepsis caused by tooth decay; his death was ruled to be from natural causes.
