= Tim Holt (American football) =

American football coach (born 1973)

Houston Gamblers
- Title: Offensive line coach

Personal information
- Born: November 23, 1973 (age 52); Dighton, Massachusetts, U.S.

Career information
- College: Southern Connecticut State

Career history
- Southern Connecticut (1995–1996) Tight ends coach & Assistant offensive line coach; Lehigh (1997–1998) Tight ends coach & Assistant offensive line coach; Cornell (1999) Tight ends coach & Assistant offensive line coach; Cornell (2000) Running backs coach; American International (2001–2003) Offensive coordinator & Offensive line coach; Southern Connecticut (2005–2007) Running backs coach; Stonehill (2008) Running game coordinator & Offensive line coach; Tampa Bay Buccaneers (2009) Offensive assistant; Tampa Bay Buccaneers (2010–2011) Assistant offensive line coach; Chicago Bears (2012) Offensive line coach; Stetson (2014) Offensive line coach & Run game coordinator; Oakland Raiders (2015–2017) Assistant offensive line coach; Santa Margarita Catholic High School (2019-2022) Offensive line coach; Michigan Panthers (2023–2025) Offensive line coach; Houston Gamblers (2026–present) Offensive line coach

Timothy P. Holt (born November 29, 1973) is an American football coach who is the offensive line coach for the Houston Gamblers of the United Football League (UFL).

He most recently coached for the Oakland Raiders of the National Football League. He was a three-year letterman at Southern Connecticut State University, and coached there for two years afterwards. Holt would serve a total of 15 years with colleges. Holt served ten of those years with the offensive line, with the rest as running backs. In 2009, Holt was hired as the Tampa Bay Buccaneers coaching intern, before becoming an offensive assistant, and becoming the assistant offensive line coach under head coach Raheem Morris and offensive coordinator Greg Olsen in 2011. In his final two seasons with the Bucs, the team's offensive line yielded 4.5 rushing yards per carry, seventh best in the NFL. Holt, along with the rest of Morris' staff, was fired after the 2011 season. He was hired by the Bears in 2012 to succeed Mike Tice, who was promoted to offensive coordinator. Holt is the fourth offensive line coach for the Bears under head coach Lovie Smith (along with Tice, Harry Hiestand, and Pete Hoener). On January 17, 2013, Holt was among seven coaches not retained by new Bears head coach Marc Trestman.

On March 15, 2023, Holt was announced as the offensive line coach for the Michigan Panthers of the United States Football League (USFL).
