= Micheal Spurlock =

American football player and coach (born 1983)

Ole Miss Rebels
- Title: Assistant Wide receivers coach

Personal information
- Born: January 31, 1983 (age 43); Indianola, Mississippi, U.S.

Career information
- Position: Wide receiver (No. 15, 17, 18, 81, 87, 86)
- College: University of Mississippi, 2005 (undergraduate) University of Phoenix (graduate)
- NFL draft: 2006: undrafted

Career history

Playing
- Arizona Cardinals (2006); Tampa Bay Buccaneers (2007–2008); San Francisco 49ers (2009); Florida Tuskers (2009); Tampa Bay Buccaneers (2009–2011); San Diego Chargers (2012); Jacksonville Jaguars (2012); San Diego Chargers (2012); Detroit Lions (2013); Dallas Cowboys (2013); Detroit Lions (2013); Chicago Bears (2014)

Coaching
- Philadelphia High School (2015) Assistant coach; Coahoma CC (2016) Running backs coach & special teams coordinator; Dallas Cowboys (2016) Special teams assistant; UTSA (2017) Special teams quality control & linebacker assistant; Southeastern Louisiana (2018–2019) Wide receivers coach & special teams coordinator; Ole Miss (2020–2021) Senior analyst; Green Bay Packers (2022) Special teams quality control coach; Western Kentucky (2023) Wide receivers coach; Southern Miss (2024–2025) Running backs coach; Ole Miss (2026–present) Offensive assistant/wide receivers

Awards and highlights
- First player in Tampa Bay Buccaneers franchise history to return a kickoff for a touchdown

Career NFL statistics
- Receptions: 47
- Receiving yards: 502
- Receiving touchdowns: 3
- Return yards: 3,367
- Return touchdowns: 5
- Stats at Pro Football Reference

Micheal Curtis Spurlock (born January 31, 1983) is an American football coach and former wide receiver. He is an offensive assistant/wide receivers coach for the University of Mississippi, a position he has held since 2026. He was signed by the Arizona Cardinals as an undrafted free agent in 2006. He played college football at Ole Miss.

Spurlock also played for the San Diego Chargers, Tampa Bay Buccaneers, San Francisco 49ers, Jacksonville Jaguars, Dallas Cowboys, Detroit Lions, Chicago Bears, and Florida Tuskers.

== Early life ==
At Gentry High School in Indianola, Mississippi, he passed for Class 5A state records of 3,348 yards and 35 touchdowns in 2000, also rushed for another 1,161 yards and scored 10 touchdowns, giving him 4,509 total yards and 45 touchdowns during senior campaign. He also currently holds the Mississippi High School State record for passing yards in a single game (581) and touchdowns in a single game (9). He earned three letters in football, four in baseball and three in basketball, playing as a shortstop-pitcher in baseball, was three-time selection as team's Most Valuable Player and Best Defensive Player. He was also the starting guard in basketball.

== College career ==
While at Ole Miss, he played in all 11 games, starting eight, seven at quarterback, and the season finale at running back, as a senior in 2005. As quarterback, he passed for 1,709 yards on 142-of-267 completions with seven touchdowns and nine interceptions and rushed for two touchdowns. He appeared in seven-of-11 games in 2004 as a junior, connected on 30-of-70 passes for 341 yards, and rushed 27 times for 59 yards. He only played in two of 13 games as a sophomore in 2003 as he was behind Eli Manning on the depth chart and he completed seven-of-eight passes for 118 yards and two touchdowns. His only action of 2002 as a redshirt freshman came against the Arkansas State Indians. He redshirted in 2001.

== Professional career ==
=== Arizona Cardinals ===
Spurlock signed with the Cardinals as an undrafted free agent rookie in 2006. Spurlock spent most of the year on the practice squad but was promoted to the roster on December 29, 2006, and in his first NFL game against the San Diego Chargers tied for the team lead with four receptions.

=== First stint with Buccaneers ===
On December 16, 2007, Spurlock became the first player in Tampa Bay Buccaneers franchise history to return a kickoff for a touchdown in a regular season game, taking a kick back 90 yards for a score in a game against the Atlanta Falcons. At the time, Tampa Bay had not returned a kickoff for a touchdown in their entire 32-year history when this was accomplished; it was the 1,865th kickoff the Buccaneers had ever received. He was cut by the team on August 31, 2008, but was quickly re-signed to their practice squad.

=== San Francisco 49ers ===
On January 21, 2009, Spurlock was signed to a future contract by the San Francisco 49ers.

After the 2009 preseason, Spurlock was officially signed to the team, due to first round draft pick Michael Crabtree holding out. He was waived by the team on November 3.

=== Second stint with Buccaneers ===
Spurlock re-signed with the Buccaneers on December 22, 2009. In his first game back with the Bucs, he returned a punt for a touchdown, leading to a 20–17 victory for Tampa Bay over the 13–1 New Orleans Saints.

On November 7, 2010, against the Atlanta Falcons, Spurlock returned a squib kick for a touchdown. It was the second kickoff return for a touchdown in his career.

=== San Diego Chargers ===
The San Diego Chargers signed Spurlock on April 4, 2012. Spurlock returned a 99-yard kick off return for a touchdown against the Oakland Raiders. The San Diego Chargers released Spurlock on October 3, 2012.

=== Jacksonville Jaguars ===
The Jacksonville Jaguars signed Spurlock on October 5, 2012.

=== Second stint with Chargers ===
Spurlock was claimed off waivers on November 28, 2012, after the Jaguars released him to make room for Jason Babin.

=== Detroit Lions ===
Spurlock signed with the Detroit Lions on June 4, 2013.

=== Dallas Cowboys ===
Spurlock signed with the Dallas Cowboys on December 18, 2013. While playing against the Washington Redskins in his first game with the Cowboys, Spurlock returned a punt for 62 yards to set up the team's first touchdown.

In order to make room for quarterback Jon Kitna, the Cowboys released Spurlock on December 25, 2013. He was re-signed by the Lions later that day.

=== Chicago Bears ===
Spurlock signed with the Chicago Bears on June 3, 2014. He was waived by the Bears on September 9.
