= Arrelious Benn =

American football player (born 1988)

No. 17
- Position: Wide receiver

Personal information
- Born: September 8, 1988 (age 38); Washington, D.C., U.S.
- Listed height: 6 ft 2 in (1.88 m)
- Listed weight: 228 lb (103 kg)

Career information
- High school: Dunbar (Washington, D.C.)
- College: Illinois (2007–2009)
- NFL draft: 2010: 2nd round, 39th overall pick

Career history
- Tampa Bay Buccaneers (2010–2012); Philadelphia Eagles (2013); Jacksonville Jaguars (2015–2017)

Awards and highlights
- First-team All-Big Ten (2008); Big Ten Freshman of the Year (2007)

Career NFL statistics
- Receptions: 65
- Receiving yards: 990
- Receiving average: 15.2
- Receiving touchdowns: 6
- Stats at Pro Football Reference

Arrelious Markus Benn (born September 8, 1988) is an American former professional football player who was a wide receiver in the National Football League (NFL). He played college football for the Illinois Fighting Illini and was selected by the Tampa Bay Buccaneers in the second round of the 2010 NFL draft.

== Early life ==
A native of Washington, DC, Benn attended Dunbar High School in the Truxton Circle neighborhood, where he was teammates with Vontae Davis and Nate Bussey. Benn played wide receiver, running back, safety, and linebacker in high school, and was named a First-team High School All-American his senior season. That year, Benn caught 56 passes for 1,039 yards and nine touchdowns, the first Dunbar player to ever crack the 1,000 yard mark. During his junior season in high school, Benn caught 50 passes for 1,147 yards and 17 touchdowns. Following his high school career, Benn was invited to play in the 2007 U.S. Army All-American Bowl.

Regarded as a five-star recruit by Rivals.com, Benn was ranked as the No. 5 wide receiver prospect in the class of 2007, behind Ronald Johnson, Terrence Toliver, Chris Culliver, and Dwight Jones. Benn chose Illinois over Maryland, Notre Dame, Miami (FL), and Florida State.

College recruiting
Name	Hometown	School	Height	Weight	40^{‡}	Commit date
Arrelious Benn; WR	Washington D.C.	Dunbar	6 ft 2 in (1.88 m)	214 lb (97 kg)	4.5	Nov 9, 2006
Arrelious Benn; WR	Recruit ratings: Scout: Rivals: (84)					
Overall recruit ranking: Scout: 12 Rivals: 24 ESPN: 17
Note: In many cases, Scout, Rivals, 247Sports, On3, and ESPN may conflict in their listings of height and weight.; In these cases, the average was taken. ESPN grades are on a 100-point scale.; Sources: "Illinois Football Commitment List". Rivals.; "2007 Illinois Football Commits". Scout.; "2007 PLAYER COMMITS". ESPN.; "Scout.com Team Recruiting Rankings". Scout.; "2007 Team Ranking". Rivals.com.

== College career ==
During his freshman season at the University of Illinois Urbana-Champaign, Benn caught 43 passes for 521 yards (54 passes for 676 yards including the Rose Bowl appearance by the Fighting Illini that season); this was the team high for the season and a school record for a freshman. Benn also added 158 yards on 32 carries on the ground, along with returning 10 kickoffs for 280 yards, including a 90-yard kickoff return for touchdown against Penn State, one of his two touchdowns that day. He was named the 2007 Big Ten Freshman of the Year.

During his sophomore campaign, Benn's stats improved to 67 rec and a Big Ten-leading 1055 yards, along with 3 touchdowns through the air, and also contributed to the run game with 101 yards on 23 carries, with 2 rushing touchdowns. On August 10, 2009, Benn was named to the Walter Camp "Players to Watch" list for its prestigious Player of the Year award, the nation's fourth-oldest individual college football accolade. On August 12, 2009, Benn was named to 2009 Biletnikoff Trophy Watch list.

As a junior, Benn suffered a right ankle sprain in the season opener against Missouri, and played injured the rest of the season, appearing in all 12 games, but accumulating only 38 receptions for 490 yards and two touchdowns through the air, to go with 7 carries for 23 yards and one touchdown on the ground.

On December 16, 2009, following his junior season, Arrelious Benn announced his decision to enter the 2010 NFL draft.

=== College statistics ===
Year	Team	Games		Receiving				Rushing				Punt returns				Kick returns			
Year	Team	GP	GS	Rec	Yds	Avg	TD	Att	Yds	Avg	TD	Ret	Yds	Avg	TD	Ret	Yds	Avg	TD
2007	Illinois	13	13	54	676	12.5	2	32	158	4.9	0	0	0	0.0	0	10	280	28.0	1
2008	Illinois	12	12	67	1,055	15.7	3	23	101	4.4	2	15	114	7.6	0	20	398	19.9	0
2009	Illinois	12	12	38	490	12.9	2	7	23	3.3	1	0	0	0.0	0	12	318	26.5	0
Total		37	37	159	2,221	14.0	7	62	282	4.5	3	15	114	7.6	0	42	996	23.7	1

=== Awards and honors ===
- Maxwell Award Candidate
- Bliletnikoff Award Candidate
- Preseason Third-team All-American (by Athlon)
- Preseason First-team All-Big Ten (by Athlon)
- Preseason First-team All-Big Ten wide receiver and kick returner (by Blue Ribbon)
- Preseason First-team All-Big Ten (by Lindy's)
- Preseason First-team All-Big Ten (by The Sporting News)
- Named Big Ten's Fastest Receiver (by The Sporting News)
- Rated the No. 20 player in the nation (by The Sporting News)
- Rated the No. 19 wide receiver in the nation (by Lindy's)
- Rated the No. 1 wide receiver in the Big Ten (by The Sporting News)
- 2007 Big Ten Freshman of the Year
- 2007 Freshman All-American

== Professional career ==
Pre-draft measurables
Height	Weight	Arm length	Hand span	40-yard dash	10-yard split	20-yard split	20-yard shuttle	Three-cone drill	Vertical jump	Broad jump	Bench press	Wonderlic
6 ft 1 in (1.85 m)	219 lb (99 kg)	32 1/4 in (0.82 m)	9 3/8 in (0.24 m)	4.42 s	1.52 s	2.60 s	4.32 s	6.78 s	37.5 in (0.95 m)	10 ft 1 in (3.07 m)	20 reps	11
All values from NFL Combine/Illinois Pro Day

=== Tampa Bay Buccaneers ===
Benn was drafted in the second round, pick 39 overall, by the Tampa Bay Buccaneers.

=== Philadelphia Eagles ===
On March 15, 2013, Benn was traded to the Philadelphia Eagles, along with a 7th-round pick, for a 2013 6th-round pick and a 2014 conditional pick. On March 21, 2013, Benn signed a one-year contract extension through 2014. On August 6, 2013, Benn tore his ACL. On August 7, 2013, Benn was placed on the Injured Reserve list, which officially ended his 2013 season. He was released by the Eagles on May 16, 2014. Benn was re-signed by Philadelphia on May 19. Benn was placed on injured reserve on August 30, 2014. He was waived with an injury settlement on September 6.

=== Jacksonville Jaguars ===
Benn signed with the Jacksonville Jaguars on January 5, 2015. On August 24, 2015, Benn was placed on the Injured Reserve list, which ended his 2015 season. On September 3, 2016, he was released by the Jaguars, but re-signed with the team a day later. The season-opening game marked the first time that Benn had been on an active NFL roster in three years. He scored a 51-yard touchdown in Week 6 against the Chicago Bears after catching a simple slant route, sliding to catch the pass, then getting up and running to the end zone without being touched. This was Benn's first touchdown reception since 2011.

On February 15, 2017, the Jaguars re-signed Benn to a one-year deal with a second year option. He was placed on injured reserve on November 18, 2017, with a knee injury.

On February 20, 2018, the Jaguars declined the option on Benn's contract, making him a free agent.
