= Donald Penn =

American football player (born 1983)

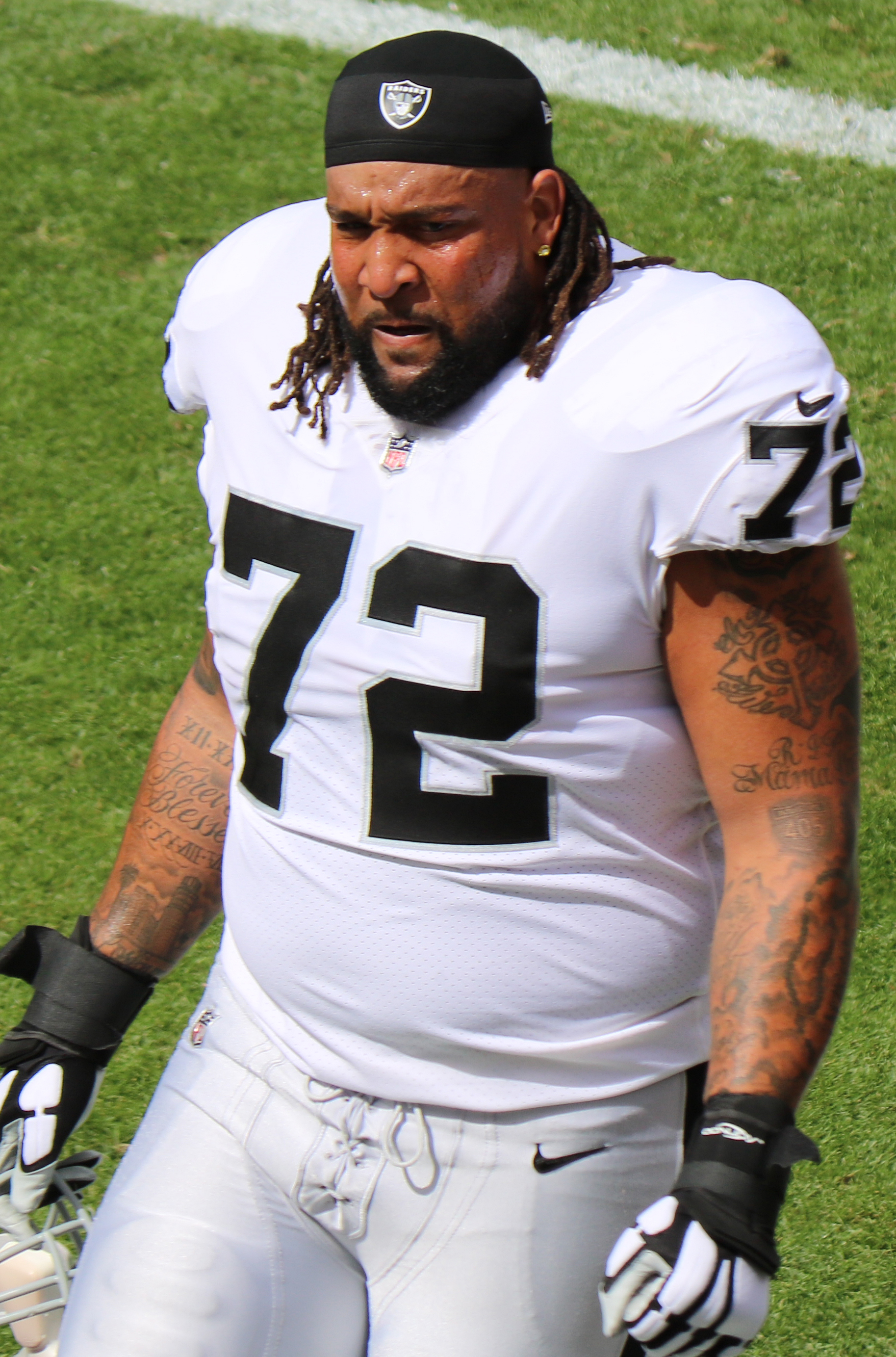
- Penn with the Oakland Raiders in 2017

No. 70, 72
- Position: Offensive tackle

Personal information
- Born: April 27, 1983 (age 43); Los Angeles, California, U.S.
- Listed height: 6 ft 4 in (1.93 m)
- Listed weight: 315 lb (143 kg)

Career information
- High school: St. Bernard (Los Angeles)
- College: Utah State (2002–2005)
- NFL draft: 2006: undrafted

Career history
- Minnesota Vikings (2006)*; Tampa Bay Buccaneers (2006–2013); Oakland Raiders (2014–2018); Washington Redskins (2019)
- * Offseason or practice squad member only

Awards and highlights
- 3× Pro Bowl (2010, 2016, 2017); Second-team All-WAC (2005); Utah State Athletics Hall of Fame

Career NFL statistics
- Games played: 194
- Games started: 189
- Receptions: 6
- Receiving yards: 26
- Receiving touchdowns: 4
- Stats at Pro Football Reference

Donald Ward Penn II (born April 27, 1983) is an American former professional football player who was an offensive tackle in the National Football League (NFL). He played college football for the Utah State Aggies, and was signed by the Minnesota Vikings as an undrafted free agent in 2006. Penn was also a member of the Tampa Bay Buccaneers, Oakland Raiders, and Washington Redskins.

== Early life ==
Penn attended St. Anthony of Padua, Gardena, and graduated to Saint Bernard Catholic High School in Playa del Rey, California. He was a student and a letterman in football and basketball. Penn did not start playing football until his junior year in high school. In football, as a senior, he was named the Team's Lineman of the Year, was a first-team All-League selection, and was a first-team All-California Interscholastic Federation selection. As a junior, he was a second-team All-League selection. In basketball, he was an All-State selection. Penn graduated from Saint Bernard Catholic High School in 2001.

== College career ==
Penn played college football for Utah State University from 2002 to 2005. He started 44 consecutive games on the offensive line. Penn took over the starting right tackle job in the third game of his true freshman season and remained the starting right tackle for the remainder of the season. He switched to left tackle as a sophomore, starting every game at left tackle for Utah State for the rest of his college career. As a senior, Penn was a team captain, and was awarded second-team all-Western Athletic Conference honors at left tackle. Penn was voted into the Utah State Aggies Athletics Hall of Fame in 2020.

== Professional career ==
Pre-draft measurables
Height	Weight	Arm length	Hand span	Bench press
6 ft 4 1/4 in (1.94 m)	317 lb (144 kg)	32 5/8 in (0.83 m)	9 5/8 in (0.24 m)	22 reps
All values from NFL Combine/Pro Day

=== Minnesota Vikings ===
Penn went undrafted in 2006. He signed with the Minnesota Vikings as an undrafted free agent, but was released prior to the start of the 2006 season.

=== Tampa Bay Buccaneers ===
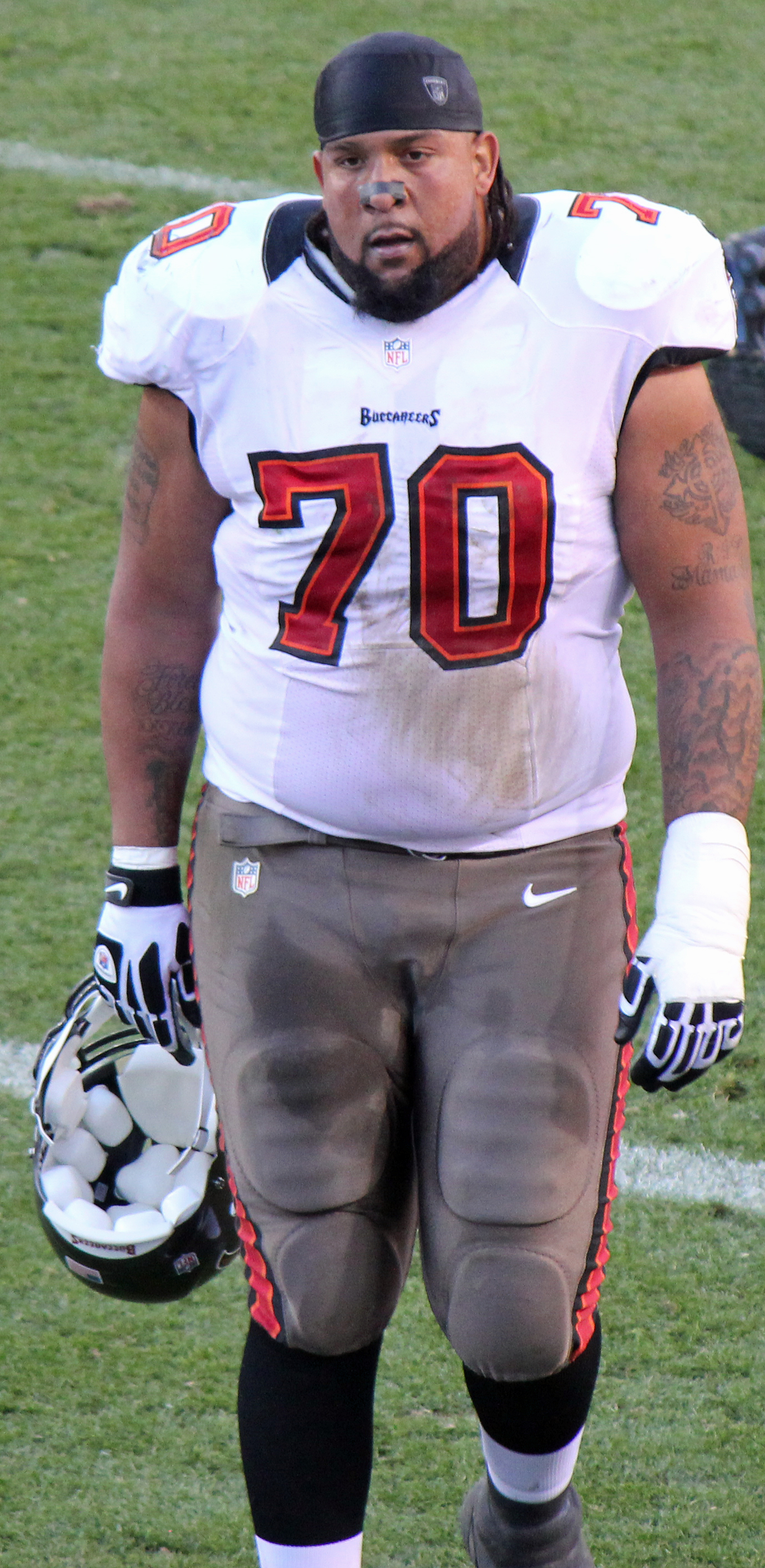
Penn with the Tampa Bay Buccaneers in 2012

Penn was signed by the Tampa Bay Buccaneers after he was released by the Vikings. Later in the season in a game against the Miami Dolphins, Penn blocked an extra point attempt. On April 10, 2009, he signed a one-year $2.792 million contract to stay with the Buccaneers. On July 30, 2010, Penn signed a six-year $43 million contract. Penn scored his first ever touchdown in the NFL on November 21, 2010, against the San Francisco 49ers. It came on a one-yard pass from Josh Freeman to put the Buccaneers up 21–0 in the 4th quarter. Penn was named to the 2011 Pro Bowl as an alternate. He replaced Green Bay Packers tackle Chad Clifton, whose team advanced to Super Bowl XLV. He was ranked 97th by his fellow players on the NFL Top 100 Players of 2012. On November 11, 2013, Penn scored his second career touchdown against the Miami Dolphins, which was also his 100th consecutive game started. Penn was released on March 13, 2014.

=== Oakland Raiders ===
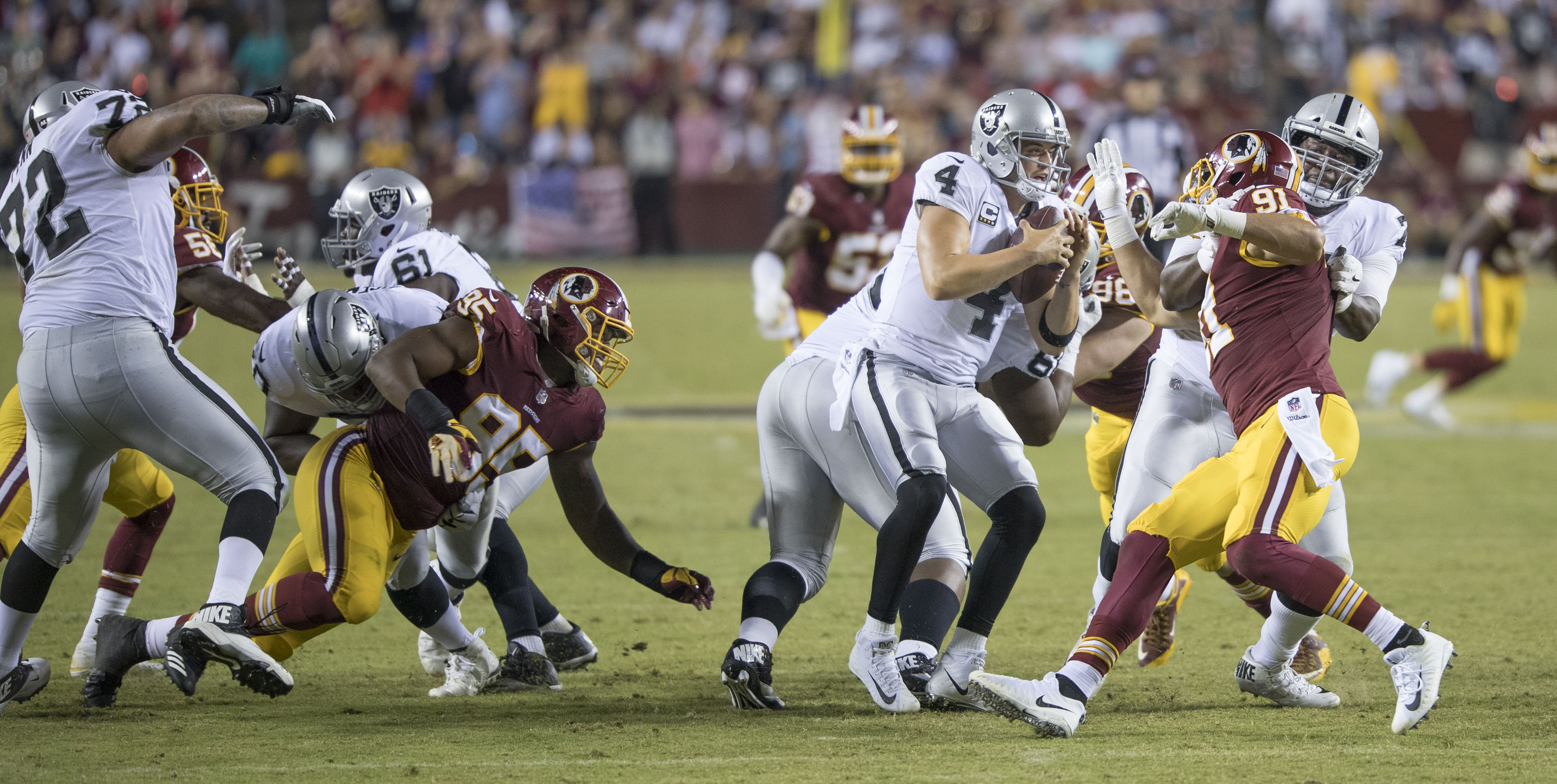
Penn (far left) in a game against the Washington Redskins

Penn was signed by the Oakland Raiders on March 18, 2014, to a two-year, $9.6 million contract with $4.2 million guaranteed. As an eligible offensive lineman, Penn scored his third career touchdown on a pass from Derek Carr against the San Francisco 49ers, this being the second time he scored against that team.

The Raiders re-signed Penn to a two-year, $14 million contract on March 16, 2016. Penn was named to his second Pro Bowl in 2016 along with fellow Raiders offensive linemen Kelechi Osemele and Rodney Hudson.

On September 15, 2017, Penn signed a two-year, $21 million contract extension with the Raiders. On December 18, 2017, Penn's season was finished after revealing that he would undergo foot surgery. He was placed on injured reserve on December 22, 2017. He was named to his third Pro Bowl but because of his foot surgery, could not participate.

In 2018, the Raiders drafted Kolton Miller in the first round of the 2018 NFL draft with the intention of being their future left tackle. At the end of training camp, Penn was moved to right tackle after Miller won the starting left tackle job. On October 3, 2018, Penn was placed on injured reserve after suffering a groin injury in Week 4. Penn was released on March 16, 2019.

=== Washington Redskins ===
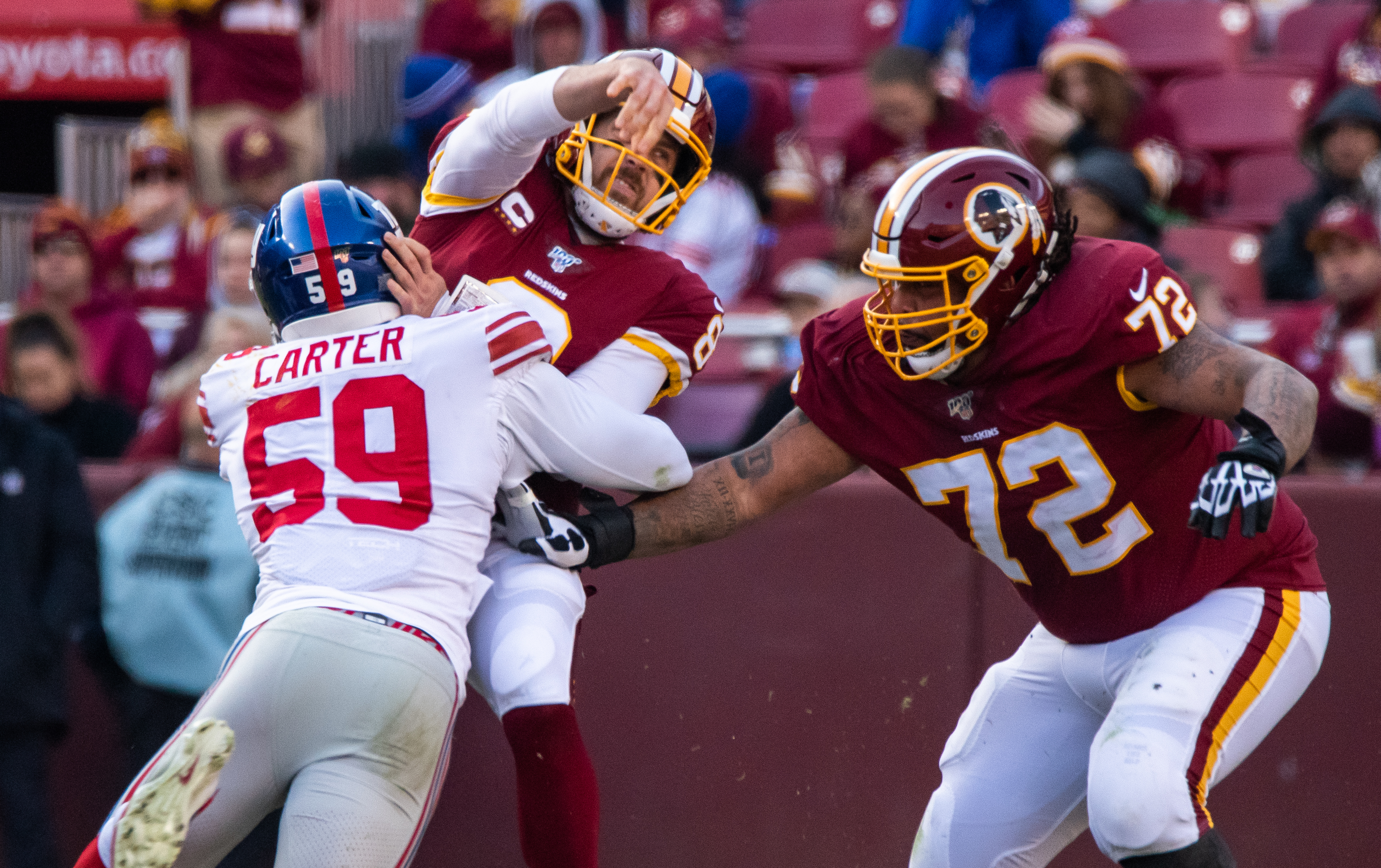
Penn in a game against the New York Giants

On July 31, 2019, Penn signed a one-year deal with the Washington Redskins. The Redskins chose not to re-sign Penn for the 2020 NFL season and Penn became a free agent.

=== Retirement ===
On March 15, 2021, Penn signed a one-day contract with the Las Vegas Raiders, to retire as a member of the team.

== Personal life ==
Penn married his wife, Dominique, in June 2012. They have two sons, Donald III and Dominick, and 1 daughter, Demi. Penn also has a daughter named, Dylan Noelle Poindexter, born March 18, 2016, with Camilla Poindexter. Donald and his wife host annual book-bag and Christmas shopping events for youth at the East Oakland Youth Development Center.
