= Malcolm Jenkins =

American football player (born 1987)

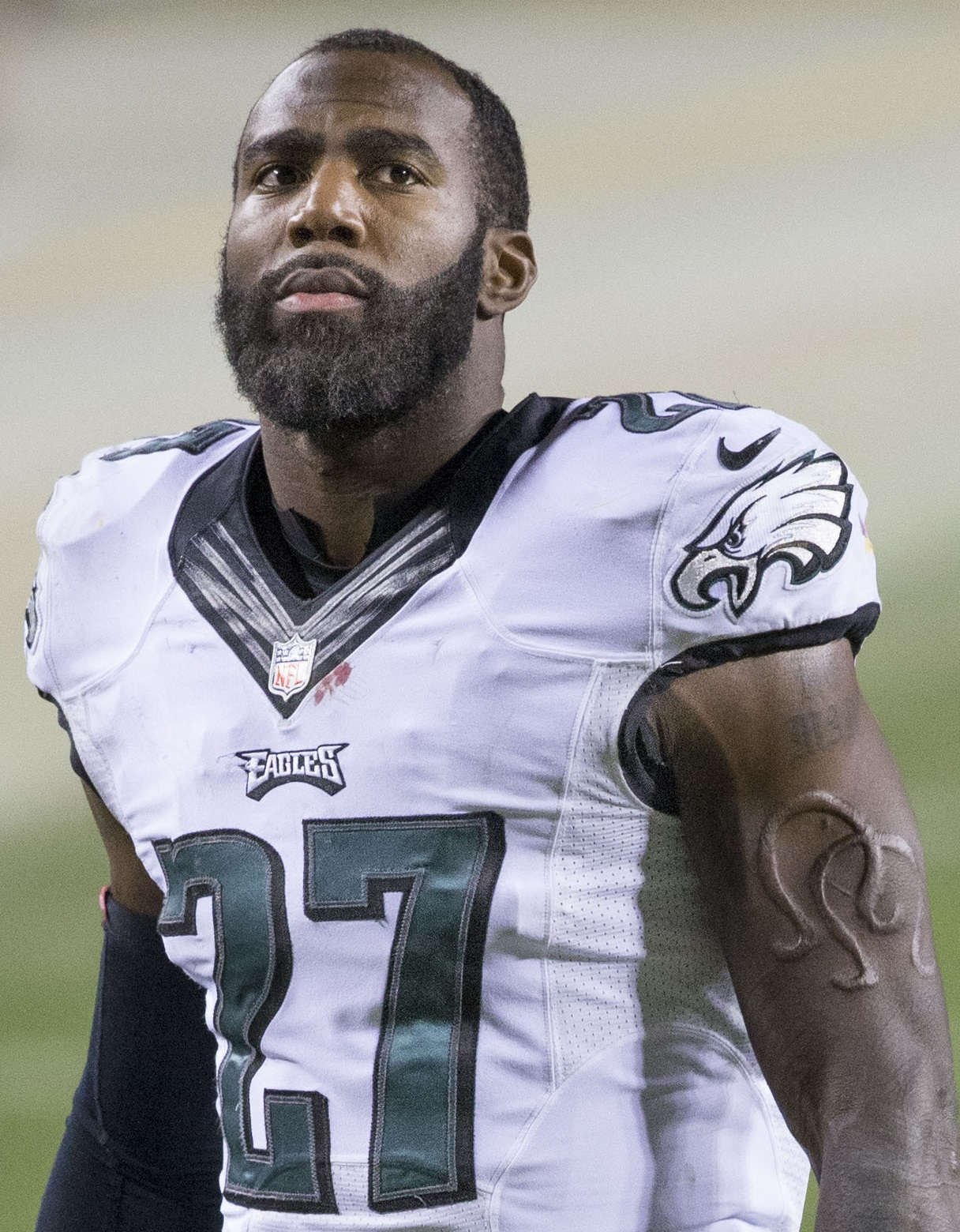
- Jenkins with the Philadelphia Eagles in 2014

No. 27
- Position: Safety

Personal information
- Born: December 20, 1987 (age 38); East Orange, New Jersey, U.S.
- Listed height: 6 ft 0 in (1.83 m)
- Listed weight: 204 lb (93 kg)

Career information
- High school: Piscataway (Piscataway, New Jersey)
- College: Ohio State (2005–2008)
- NFL draft: 2009: 1st round, 14th overall pick

Career history
- New Orleans Saints (2009–2013); Philadelphia Eagles (2014–2019); New Orleans Saints (2020–2021)

Awards and highlights
- 2× Super Bowl champion (XLIV, LII); Second-team All-Pro (2010); 3× Pro Bowl (2015, 2017, 2018); Philadelphia Eagles Hall of Fame; Jim Thorpe Award (2008); Consensus All-American (2008); Second-team All-American (2007); 3× First-team All-Big Ten (2006–2008)

Career NFL statistics
- Total tackles: 1,044
- Sacks: 13.5
- Forced fumbles: 20
- Fumble recoveries: 11
- Interceptions: 21
- Defensive touchdowns: 8
- Stats at Pro Football Reference

Malcolm Jenkins (born December 20, 1987) is an American former professional football player who was a safety for 13 seasons in the National Football League (NFL). He played college football for the Ohio State Buckeyes, earning consensus All-American honors, and winning the Jim Thorpe Award as a senior. He was selected by the New Orleans Saints in the first round of the 2009 NFL draft and played for the Philadelphia Eagles from 2014 to 2019.

== Early life ==
Jenkins grew up in Piscataway, New Jersey and played high school football at Piscataway Township High School, where he helped lead his team to three consecutive state championships. He played both wide receiver and defensive back for the Chiefs football team. He also excelled at track, winning the state title in the 400 metres as a junior.

Considered a three-star recruit by Rivals.com, Jenkins was listed as No. 61 cornerback prospect in the nation in 2005.

== College career ==
During his freshman season at Ohio State, Jenkins spent most of his time in the nickelback position. He finished the season with 37 tackles in 10 games. In 2006, he started all 13 games at corner and was a consensus first-team All-Big Ten. He finished 2006 with 55 tackles and four interceptions. As a junior in 2007 Jenkins recorded 47 tackles and four interceptions and was named a first-team All-American by Pro Football Weekly and a first-team All-Big Ten for the second consecutive year. As a senior in 2008 he won the Jim Thorpe Award, which is given to the nation's best defensive back, after recording 57 tackles and three interceptions.

Jenkins is a member of Omega Psi Phi fraternity. He was vice president, stepmaster, and chaplain of the Ohio State chapter; he has two prominent fraternity tattoos, one on his upper left arm and a second one on his chest.

== Professional career ==
=== Pre-draft ===
Jenkins and Vontae Davis were considered the top two defensive backs available in the 2009 NFL draft, and Jenkins drew comparisons to Terence Newman. After Jenkins ran a comparably slow 40-yard dash, some scouts considered him better suited for the safety position.

Pre-draft measurables
Height	Weight	Arm length	Hand span	40-yard dash	10-yard split	20-yard split	20-yard shuttle	Three-cone drill	Vertical jump	Broad jump	Bench press	Wonderlic
6 ft 0 1/8 in (1.83 m)	204 lb (93 kg)	34 1/2 in (0.88 m)	9 1/4 in (0.23 m)	4.59 s	1.60 s	2.67 s	4.08 s	6.59 s	33.0 in (0.84 m)	10 ft 4 in (3.15 m)	15 reps	23
All values from NFL Combine

=== New Orleans Saints (first stint) ===
The New Orleans Saints selected Jenkins in the first round (14th overall) of the 2009 NFL draft. Jenkins was the first cornerback to be drafted by the Saints in the first round since Oregon's Alex Molden went eleventh overall in the 1996 NFL draft.

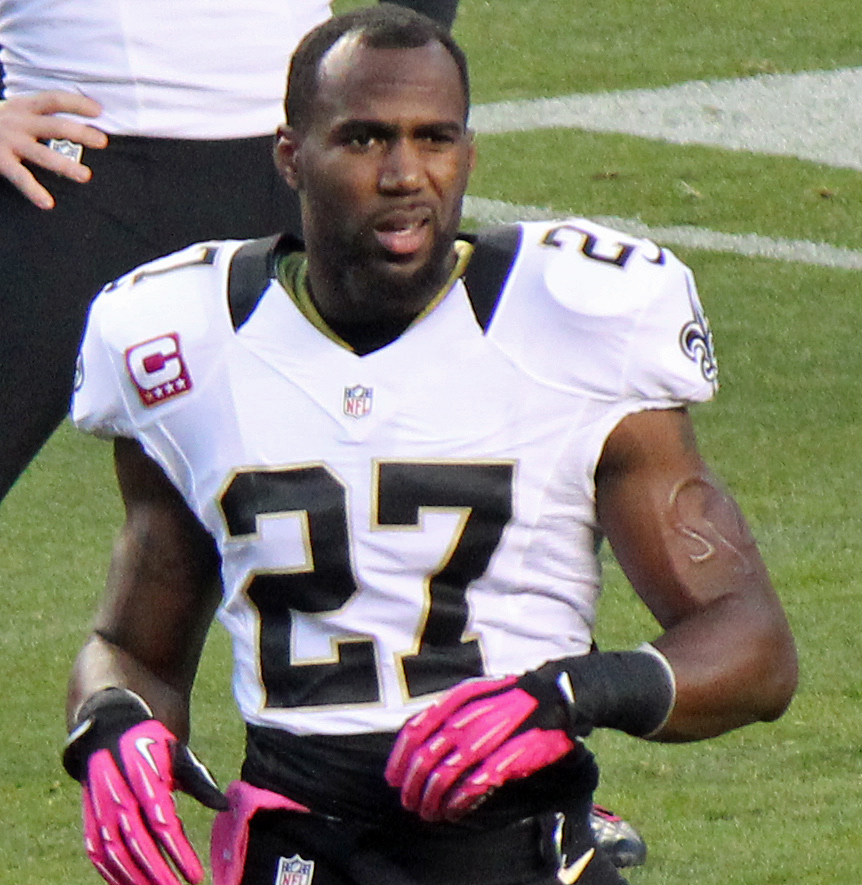
Jenkins with the New Orleans Saints in 2012

==== 2009 ====
On August 9, 2009, the New Orleans Saints signed Jenkins on a five–year, $19 million contract that includes $11.00 million guaranteed and an initial signing bonus of $800,000. Their agreement ended Jenkins' 11-day training camp holdout.

He missed that beginning of training camp due to his contract hold out, but upon arrival, he competed against Tracy Porter, Jabari Greer, and Randall Gay to be a starting cornerback. Head coach Sean Payton named him a backup and listed him as the third cornerback on the depth chart to begin the season, behind starters Tracy Porter and Jabari Greer.

On September 13, 2009, Jenkins made his professional regular season debut in the New Orleans Saints' home-opener against the Detroit Lions and made one solo tackle in their 45–27 victory. He made first career tackle on running back Aaron Brown and stopped him from scoring on an 87-yard kick return in the third quarter. He was inactive for the Saints' 24–10 victory against the New York Jets in Week 4 after due to an ankle sprain he sustained the previous week. He aggravated his ankle sprain and was inactive as the Saints won 46–34 at the Miami Dolphins in Week 7. He was named a starting cornerback heading into Week 11 due to Jabari Greer injuring his groin in Week 9 and Tracy Porter spraining his MCL the following week. On November 22, 2009, Jenkins earned his first career start and recorded seven combined tackles (five solo), set a season-high with two pass deflections, and made the first interception of his career on a pass attempt thrown by Josh Freeman to wide receiver Antonio Bryant during the second quarter of a 38–7 victory at the Tampa Bay Buccaneers in Week 11. He remained the starter for the next six games after Greer was sidelined for the next seven games (Weeks 10–16) and Porter was sidelined for the next four games (11–14) In Week 13, he collected a season-high nine solo tackles and broke up a pass in a 33–30 win at the Washington Redskins. On December 27, 2009, Jenkins made a season-high ten combined tackles (eight solo) in the Saints' 20–17 loss to the Tampa Bay Buccaneers in Week 16. He finished his rookie season in 2009 with 55 combined tackles (49 solo), four pass deflections, and an interception in 14 games and six starts.

The New Orleans Saints finished first in the NFC South with a 13–3 record, clinching a first round bye and home-field advantage throughout the playoffs. On January 16, 2010, Jenkins appeared in his first career playoff game as the Saints' defeated the Arizona Cardinals 45–14 in the NFC Divisional Round. The Saints reached the Super Bowl after winning the NFC Championship Game in a 31–28 win against the Minnesota Vikings. On February 7, 2010, Jenkins appeared in Super Bowl XLIV and recorded four solo tackles and a pass deflection in the Saints' 31–17 victory against the Indianapolis Colts.

==== 2010 ====
During the 2010 NFL draft, the Saints selected Patrick Robinson in the first round (32nd overall). His addition to a group including Jabari Greer, Tracy Porter, and Randall Gay, became the catalyst for Jenkins transition to safety. On May 8, 2010, head coach Sean Payton addressed media during a press conference at rookie mini-camp, officially stating he intended to move Jenkins to safety during training camp. During training camp, Jenkins started his transition to the safety position and also competed to be a backup safety against Usama Young under defensive coordinator Gregg Williams. He performed well enough to earn the starting role at free safety after starter Darren Sharper was added to the PUP list as he recovered from undergoing microfracture surgery. He was paired with starting strong safety Roman Harper to begin the regular season.

In Week 4, he recorded four solo tackles and had his first career sack on quarterback Jimmy Clausen for a four–yard loss during the closing seconds of the fourth quarter as the Saints defeated the Carolina Panthers 16–14. In Week 7, he collected a season-high nine combined tackles (eight solo) during a 30–17 loss to the Cleveland Browns. In Week 9, he sustained a neck injury during a 34–3 victory at the Carolina Panthers and was subsequently inactive for the Saints' 34–19 win against the Seattle Seahawks in Week 11. On November 25, 2010, Jenkins made four combined tackles (three solo) and sparked a comeback by the Saints when they were down 27–23 with 3:20 remaining in the fourth quarter after he forced a fumble by wide receiver Roy Williams and recovered it, leading it to a 14-yard touchdown pass by Drew Brees to win 30–27 at the Dallas Cowboys. Following his performance, head coach Sean Payton said Jenkins performed "one of those plays that inspires everybody on the team". He was named NFC Defensive Player of the Week for his performance. On December 12, 2010, Jenkins made four solo tackles, tied his season-high of three pass deflections, and had a season-high two interceptions and scored the first touchdown of his career during a 31–13 victory against the St. Louis Rams in Week 14. He scored the first touchdown of his career on a pick-six, intercepting a pass by Sam Bradford and returned it for a 96-yards touchdown in the third quarter. His performance earned him NFC Defensive Player of the Week honors for the second time in 2010. Jenkins injured his knee in the Saints' Week 17 loss to the Tampa Bay Buccaneers and was forced to miss the NFC Wildcard Game. In his first season at safety, Jenkins had a total of 64 combined tackles (54 solo), made 12 pass deflections, two interceptions, one forced fumble, a fumble recovery, one sack, and a touchdown in 15 games and 15 starts.

==== 2011 ====
He entered training camp as the de facto starting free safety, following the departure of Darren Sharper after the Saints elected not to re-sign him. He returned as the starting free safety, alongside Roman Harper, to begin the season.

In Week 14, Jenkins collected a season-high ten combined tackles (eight solo) during a 22–17 victory at the Tennessee Titans. On December 26, 2011, Jenkins made one solo tackle, tied his season-high of two pass deflections, and also scored the second touchdown of his career after he recovered a fumble that linebacker Scott Shanle forced by wide receiver Julio Jones and returned it for a 30-yard touchdown as the Saints routed the Atlanta Falcons 45–16. He was inactive as a healthy scratch for the Saints 45–17 victory against the Carolina Panthers in Week 17 as head coach Sean Payton chose to rest his starting lineup in preparation for the playoffs as they had already clinched a playoff berth with a 12–3 record. He completed the 2011 season with 77 combined tackles (63 solo), nine passes defensed, and a sack in 15 games and 15 starts.

The New Orleans Saints finished first in the NFC South during the 2011 NFL season with a 13–3 record. On January 7, 2012, Jenkins had his first career start in a playoff game and made five combined tackles (four solo) during a 45–28 win against the Detroit Lions during the NFC Wildcard Game. On January 14, 2012, he started in the NFC Divisional Round and made eight solo tackles, a pass deflection, and sacked quarterback Alex Smith as the Saints lost 36–32 at the San Francisco 49ers.

==== 2012 ====
The New Orleans Saints hired Steve Spagnuolo as their new defensive coordinator after Gregg Williams was indefinitely suspended for his involvement in the New Orleans Saints bounty scandal. Head coach Sean Payton was also suspended for the 2012 season and named linebackers coach Joe Vitt the interim head coach. Vitt named Aaron Kromer the interim head coach for the first six weeks after he received a suspension for the first six regular season games for his part in the Bounty scandal. Jenkins and Roman Harper were both retained as the starting safeties despite the coaching changes.

On November 5, 2012, he collected a season-high 13 combined tackles (seven solo) in the Saints' 28–13 victory against the Philadelphia Eagles in Week 9. In Week 11, Jenkins recorded six combined tackles, broke up a pass, and returned an interception for a touchdown during a 38–17 victory at the Oakland Raiders. He returned an interception by quarterback Carson Palmer, that was intended for tight end Brandon Myers, for a 55-yard touchdown in the first quarter. The touchdown was Jenkins' second pick six of his career. Jenkins was inactive for the last three regular season games (Weeks 15–17) due to a hamstring injury. Jenkins finished the 2012 season with 94 combined tackles (65 solo), seven pass deflections, an interception, and a touchdown in 13 games and 13 starts.

==== 2013 ====
The New Orleans Saints' new defensive coordinator Rob Ryan held a competition to name starting safeties between Jenkins, Roman Harper, and rookie 2013 first round pick Kenny Vaccaro throughout training camp. Head coach Sean Payton named Jenkins the starting free safety to begin the regular season, opposite strong safety Roman Harper.

On October 13, 2013, Jenkins recorded eight combined tackles, a pass deflection, and earned a career-high 1½ sacks on Tom Brady during a 30–27 loss at the New England Patriots in Week 6. Jenkins was inactive for two games (Weeks 9–10) due to a back injury. In Week 13, he collected a season-high ten combined tackles (seven solo) in the Saints' 34–7 loss at the Seattle Seahawks. He finished the 2013 season with 68 combined tackles (44 solo), six pass deflections, 2½ sacks, and two interceptions in 14 games and 14 starts.

The New Orleans Saints finished second in the NFC South with an 11–5 record and defeated the Philadelphia Eagles 26–24 in the NFC Wildcard Game. On January 11, 2014, Jenkins played in his last game as a member of the Saints and recorded five combined tackles during 23–15 loss at the Seattle Seahawks in the NFC Divisional Round.

==== 2014 ====
He became an unrestricted free agent for the first time in his career in 2014. He garnered interest from multiple teams, but did not receive a contract offer from the Saints.

=== Philadelphia Eagles ===
On March 11, 2014, the Philadelphia Eagles signed Jenkins to a three–year, $15.50 million contract that included $8.50 million guaranteed, $6.00 million guaranteed upon signing, and an initial signing bonus of $5.00 million.

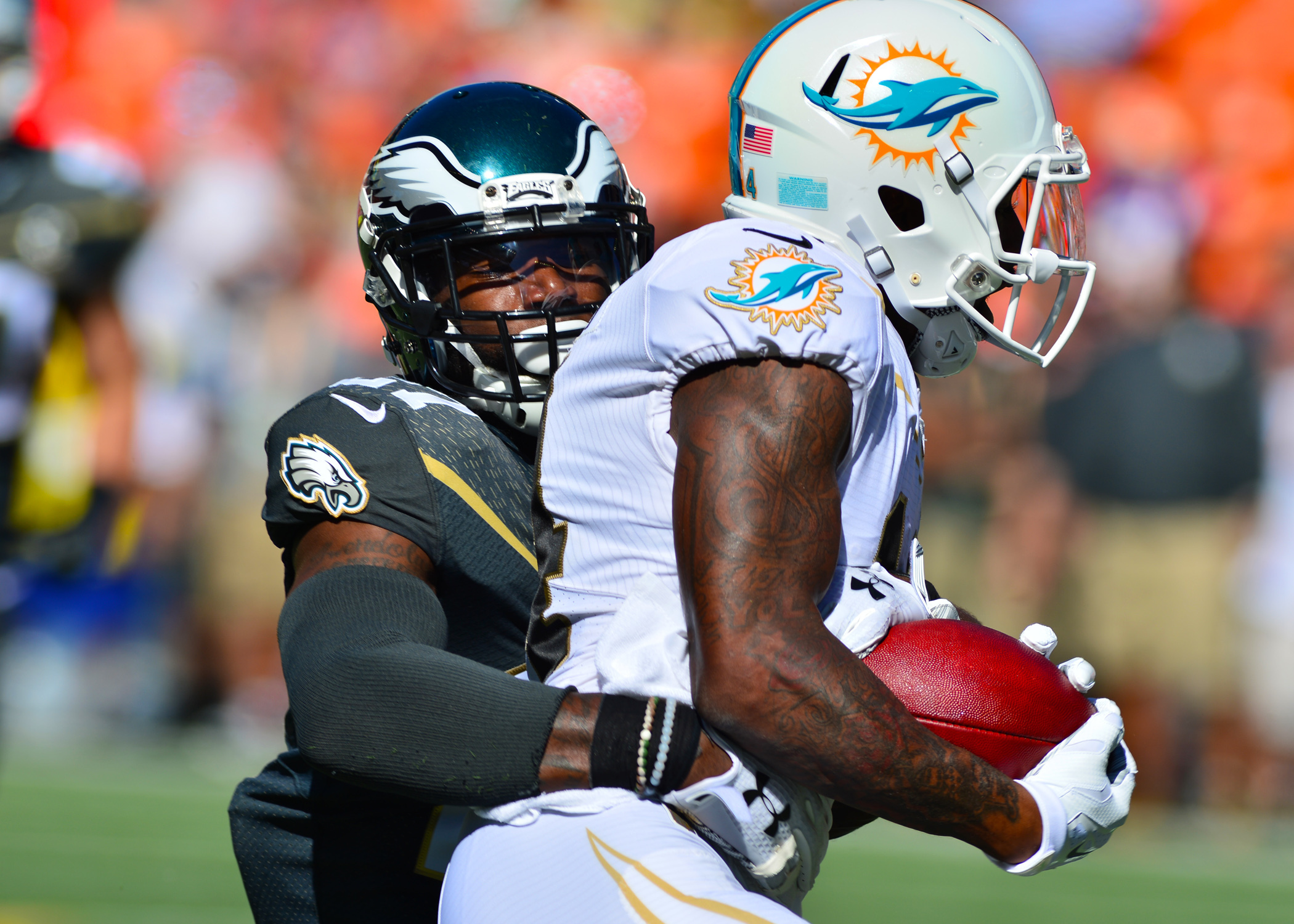
Jenkins tackling Jarvis Landry in the 2016 Pro Bowl

He entered camp slated as the de facto starting free safety. Head coach Chip Kelly officially named him the starter to begin the regular season, along with strong safety Nate Allen.

On September 28, 2014, Jenkins recorded seven combined tackles, a pass deflection, and returned an interception by quarterback Colin Kaepernick for a 53-yard touchdown during a 26–21 loss at the San Francisco 49ers in Week 4. The pick six marked his third touchdown of his career and was his third consecutive game with an interception. In Week 15, he collected a season-high eight solo tackles in the Eagles' 38–27 loss to the Dallas Cowboys. Jenkins finished the 2014 season with 80 combined tackles (64 solo), 15 passes defensed, three interceptions, a forced fumble, a fumble recovery, and a touchdown in 16 games and 16 starts.

==== 2015 ====
Jenkins returned as the starting free safety in 2015 and played alongside strong safety Walter Thurmond. On October 25, 2015, he made a season-high ten combined tackles (eight solo) and broke up a pass during a 20–19 loss to the Miami Dolphins in Week 10. On December 6, 2015, Jenkins recorded seven combined tackles, deflected a pass, and returned an interception for a touchdown in the Eagles 35–28 victory at the New England Patriots in Week 13. He intercepted a pass by quarterback Tom Brady, that was thrown to Danny Amendola at the goal line, and returned it for a 99-yard touchdown in the third quarter. It became Jenkins fourth career pick six and his performance earned him NFC Defensive Player of the Week. On December 28, 2015, the Philadelphia Eagles fired head coach Chip Kelly after finishing Week 16 with a 6–9 record.

Jenkins finished his second and last season under defensive coordinator Billy Davis with a career-high 109 combined tackles (90 solo), ten pass deflections, two interceptions, three forced fumbles, and a fumble recovery in 16 games and 16 starts. Pro football focus gave Jenkins an overall grade of 85.8, which ranked second among all qualifying safeties in 2015. On January 25, 2016, Jenkins announced via Twitter that he was added to the 2016 Pro Bowl after originally being named a seventh alternate.

==== 2016 ====
On February 22, 2016, the Philadelphia Eagles signed Jenkins to a four–year, $35.00 million contract extension that included $21.00 million guaranteed, $16.00 million guaranteed upon signing, and an initial signing bonus of $7.50 million. He also had a year remaining on his previous contract from 2014. In total, Jenkins is due $40.50 million over the next five seasons (2016–2020).

The Philadelphia Eagles' new head coach Doug Pederson retained Jenkins as a safety, alongside Rodney McLeod. In Week 2, he collected five combined tackles, deflected a pass, and sacked quarterback Jay Cutler during a 29–14 win at the Chicago Bears. On October 16, 2016, Jenkins recorded six combined tackles, two pass deflections, and returned an interception for a touchdown in the Eagles' 27–20 loss at the Washington Redskins in Week 6. He intercepted a pass by Kirk Cousins that was initially intended for tight end Vernon Davis and returned it for a 64-yard touchdown in the second quarter. On December 22, 2016, Jenkins made six combined tackles, a season-high three pass deflections, intercepted two passes, and returned one for a touchdown in a 24–19 victory against the New York Giants in Week 16. He intercepted a pass by quarterback Eli Manning originally intended for tight end Will Tye and returned it for a 34-yard touchdown in the first quarter. It became Jenkins' sixth pick six of his career. Jenkins completed the 2016 season with 72 combined tackles (47 solo), nine passes defensed, three interceptions, two touchdowns, and a sack in 16 games and 16 starts. He was ranked the 90th best player in the league on the NFL Top 100 Players of 2017.

==== 2017 ====
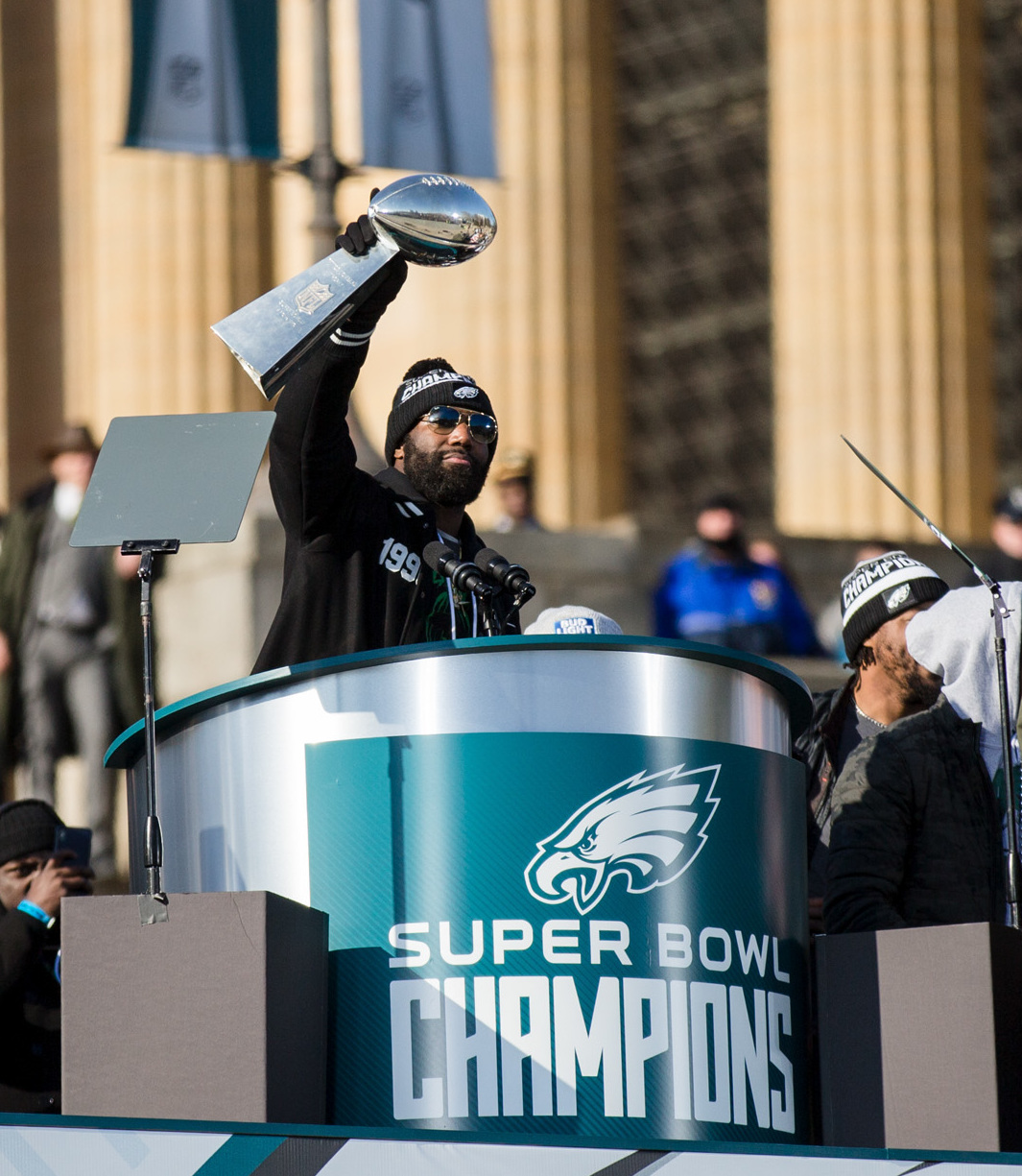
Jenkins holds the Vince Lombardi Trophy at the Eagles' Super Bowl LII parade in Center City Philadelphia in February 2018

Defensive coordinator Jim Schwartz retained Jenkins and Rodney McLeod as the starting safety duo to begin the 2017 season. In Week 7, Jenkins collected a career-high ten solo tackles and a sack during a 34–24 win against the Washington Redskins. In Week 12, he made two combined tackles, a pass deflection, and an interception during a 31–3 victory against the Chicago Bears. It marked Jenkins' second consecutive game with an interception. On December 19, 2017, it was announced that Jenkins was voted to the 2017 Pro Bowl. (He was unable to participate because the Eagles played in the Super Bowl.) He finished the 2017 season with 76 combined tackles (63 solo), eight pass deflections, two interceptions, and a sack in 16 games and 16 starts. Pro Football Focus gave Jenkins an overall grade of 84.2, which ranked 19th among all qualifying safeties in 2017. He was ranked 96th by his peers on the NFL Top 100 Players of 2018.

The Philadelphia Eagles finished first in the NFC East with a 13–3 record and received a first round bye and home-field advantage throughout the playoffs. The Eagles advanced to the Super Bowl after defeating the Atlanta Falcons 15–10 in the NFC Divisional Round and the Minnesota Vikings 38–7 in the NFC Championship Game. On February 4, 2018, Jenkins started in Super Bowl LII and recorded four solo tackles and a pass deflection as the Eagles defeated the New England Patriots 41–33. The victory in Super Bowl LII marked Jenkins' second Super Bowl victory and became the second time he helped a team achieve its first Super Bowl win in franchise history.

==== 2018 ====
In week 2 against the Tampa Bay Buccaneers, Jenkins recorded 5 tackles and forced his first fumble of the season on wide receiver Mike Evans which was recovered by teammate Jordan Hicks during the 27–21 loss. In week 8 against the Jacksonville Jaguars in London, Jenkins recovered a fumble forced by teammate Avonte Maddox on wide receiver Keelan Cole during the 24–18 win. In week 12 against the New York Giants, Jenkins recorded his first interception of the season off a pass thrown by Eli Manning and returned it 25 yards during the 25–22 win. In the following week's game against the Washington Redskins, Jenkins recorded his first sack of the season on Colt McCoy during the 28–13 win. In week 15 against the Los Angeles Rams, Jenkins recorded a season high 12 tackles during the 30–23 win. Jenkins finished the season with 97 tackles (79 solo), one sack, three forced fumbles, one fumble recovery, eight pass deflections, and one interception in 16 games started.

In the wild-card round of the playoffs against the Chicago Bears, Jenkins recorded 5 tackles during the 16–15 win which became known as Double Doink. In the divisional round of the playoffs against Jenkins' former team, the New Orleans Saints, he recorded a team high 10 tackles during the 20–14 loss.

==== 2019 ====
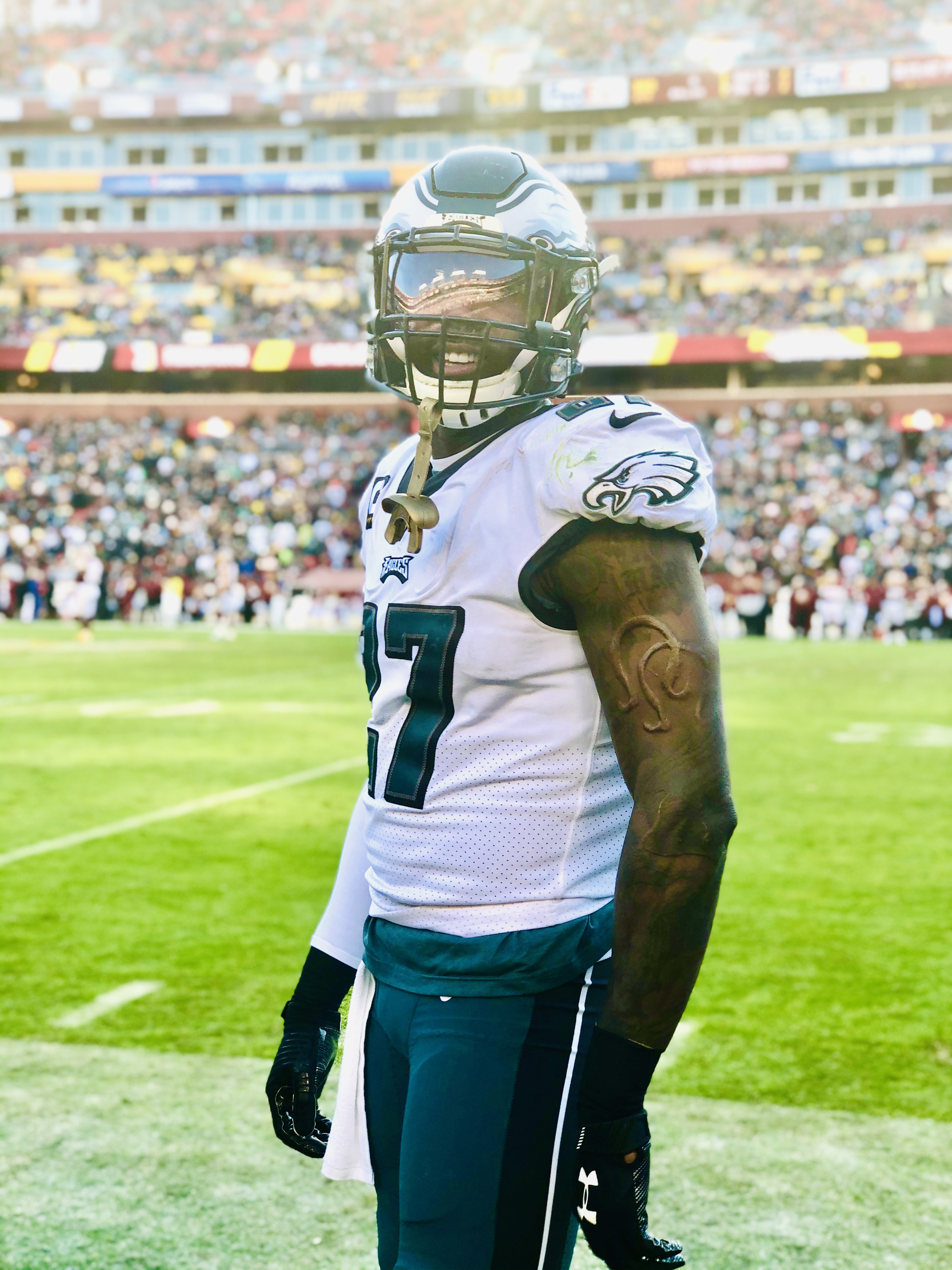
Jenkins in a game against the Washington Redskins

In week 6 against the Minnesota Vikings, Jenkins recorded a season high 8 tackles and forced a fumble on rookie running back Alexander Mattison which was recovered by teammate Kamu Grugier-Hill during the 38–20 loss. In week 12 against the Seattle Seahawks, Jenkins recorded 6 tackles and his first two sacks of the season on Russell Wilson during the 17–9 loss. In week 16 against the Dallas Cowboys, Jenkins recorded 5 tackles and recovered a fumble forced by teammate Fletcher Cox on rookie running back Tony Pollard during the 17–9 win. In week 17 against the New York Giants, Jenkins forced a fumble on rookie quarterback Daniel Jones which was recovered by Fletcher Cox during the 34–17 win. Jenkins finished the season with 80 combined tackles (62 solo), 2.5 sacks, four forced fumbles, one fumble recovery, and eight pass deflections in 16 games started.

In the wild-card round of the playoffs against the Seattle Seahawks, Jenkins recorded a team high 9 tackles and sacked Russell Wilson twice during the 17–9 loss.

The Eagles declined to pick up Jenkins' contract option for the 2020 season, making him a free agent at the start of the new league year on March 18, 2020.

=== New Orleans Saints (second stint) ===
On March 23, 2020, the New Orleans Saints signed Jenkins to a four-year, $32 million contract that included$16.25 million guaranteed and a signing bonus of $9.00 million.

In Week 2 against the Las Vegas Raiders, Jenkins recorded his first sack of the season on Derek Carr during the 24–34 loss.

In Week 9 against the Tampa Bay Buccaneers, Jenkins recorded his first interception of the season off a pass thrown by Tom Brady during the 38–3 win.

In Week 17 against the Carolina Panthers, Jenkins recorded his 3rd interception of the season off a pass thrown by Teddy Bridgewater during the 33–7 win. Jenkins' third interception of the season tied his single-season career high.

On March 30, 2022, Jenkins announced his retirement.

== NFL career statistics ==
Legend
	Won the Super Bowl
**Bold**	Career high

=== Regular season ===
Year	Team	Games		Tackles				Interceptions						Fumbles			
Year	Team	GP	GS	Cmb	Solo	Ast	Sck	PD	Int	Yds	Avg	Lng	TD	FF	FR	Yds	TD
2009	NO	14	6	55	49	6	0.0	4	1	14	14.0	14	0	2	1	0	0
2010	NO	15	15	64	54	10	1.0	12	2	**105**	52.5	96T	1	1	**2**	0	0
2011	NO	15	15	77	63	14	1.0	9	0	0	0.0	0	0	1	1	30	**1**
2012	NO	13	13	94	65	**29**	0.0	7	1	55	**55.0**	55T	1	0	0	0	0
2013	NO	14	14	68	44	24	**2.5**	6	2	35	17.5	31	0	2	0	0	0
2014	PHI	**16**	**16**	80	64	16	0.0	**15**	**3**	67	22.3	53T	1	1	1	0	0
2015	PHI	**16**	**16**	**109**	**90**	19	0.0	10	2	99	49.5	**99T**	1	3	1	**34**	0
2016	PHI	**16**	**16**	72	47	25	1.0	9	**3**	98	32.7	64T	**2**	0	1	0	0
2017	PHI	**16**	**16**	76	63	13	1.0	8	2	0	0.0	0	0	1	1	0	0
2018	PHI	**16**	**16**	97	79	18	1.0	8	1	25	25.0	25	0	3	1	11	0
2019	PHI	**16**	**16**	81	63	18	**2.5**	8	0	0	0.0	0	0	**4**	1	0	0
2020	NO	**16**	**16**	91	69	22	**2.5**	10	**3**	58	19.3	48	0	1	1	0	0
2021	NO	**16**	**16**	79	53	26	1.0	5	1	34	34.0	34	1	1	0	0	0
Total		199	191	1,044	804	240	13.5	111	21	590	28.1	99	7	20	11	75	1

== Personal life ==
Jenkins started his own charity called The Malcolm Jenkins Foundation. According to their website, The Malcolm Jenkins Foundation "is committed to youth development initiatives and programs which emphasize mentorship, character development, leadership, education, life skills, health and recreation." He also started the Let's Listen Together initiative where he talks to Superintendent of Police Michael Chitwood to discuss social justice issues affecting police and community relations following shootings of unarmed people by police officers.

=== National anthem protest ===
On September 19, 2016, Jenkins began raising his fist during the national anthem to bring attention to racial inequality and continued to do it every week throughout 2016 and 2017. He said he would not stop protesting during the national anthem even if the NFL or his team's owner prohibited players from doing so. Jenkins has met on Capitol Hill with legislators, written an opinion-editorial in The Washington Post and signed a letter to NFL commissioner Roger Goodell explaining his perspective on the issues.

On June 4, 2020, Jenkins posted an Instagram video in response to Drew Brees's comments that criticized protests during the National Anthem.

In July 2020, Jenkins received backlash after issuing a message that was seen by many in the Jewish community as dismissive in response to DeSean Jackson posting antisemitic posts on his Instagram account that included a quote falsely attributed to Adolf Hitler. Jenkins said that Jackson's posts were a "distraction" and that "Jewish people aren't our problem."
