= Chris Ivory =

American football player (born 1988)

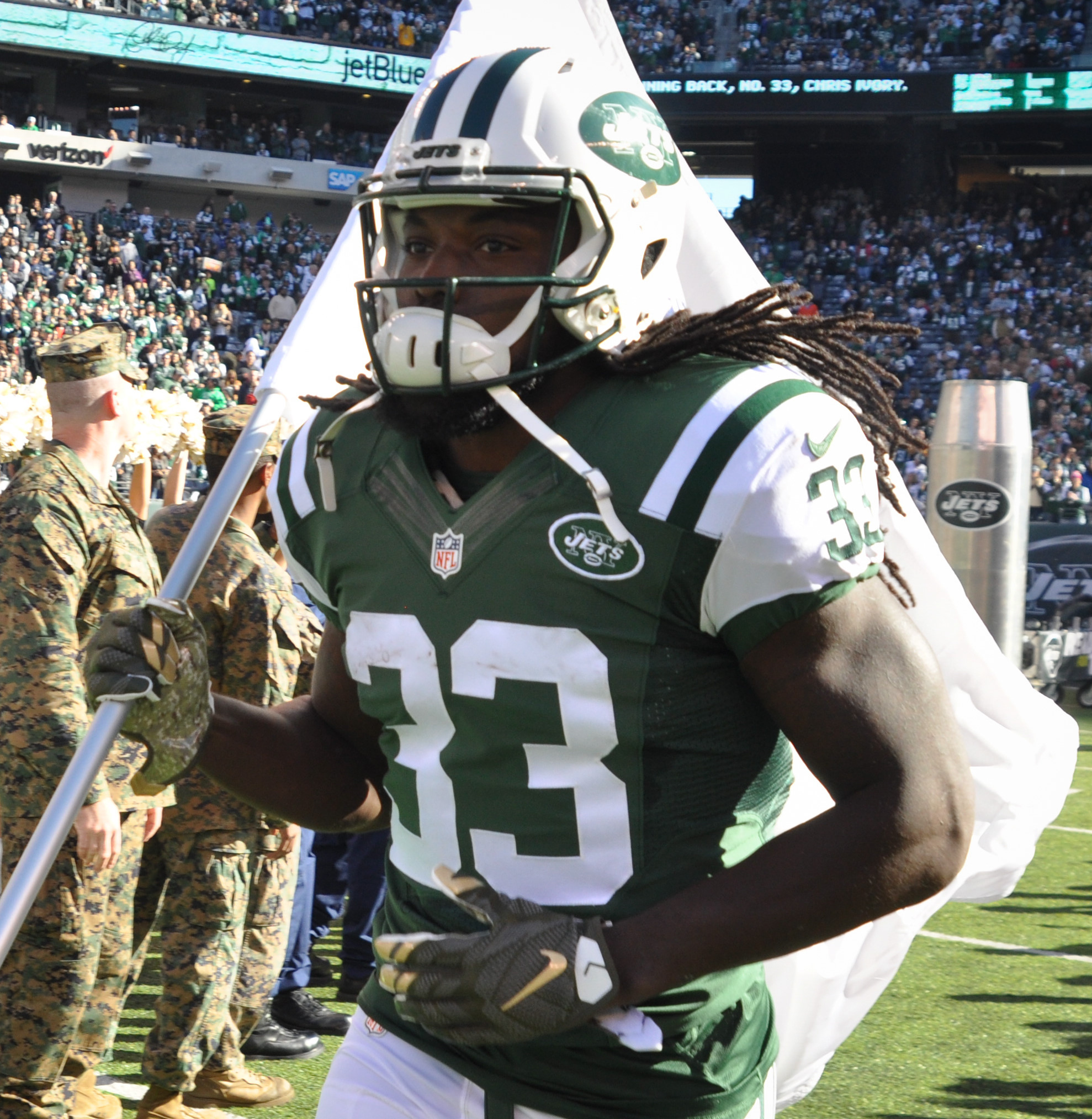
- Ivory with the New York Jets in 2015

No. 29, 33
- Position: Running back

Personal information
- Born: March 22, 1988 (age 38); Longview, Texas, U.S.
- Listed height: 6 ft 0 in (1.83 m)
- Listed weight: 223 lb (101 kg)

Career information
- High school: Longview
- College: Washington State (2006–2008); Tiffin (2009)
- NFL draft: 2010: undrafted

Career history
- New Orleans Saints (2010–2012); New York Jets (2013–2015); Jacksonville Jaguars (2016–2017); Buffalo Bills (2018)

Awards and highlights
- Pro Bowl (2015); PFWA All-Rookie Team (2010)

Career NFL statistics
- Rushing yards: 5,237
- Rushing average: 4.3
- Rushing touchdowns: 29
- Receptions: 107
- Receiving yards: 948
- Receiving touchdowns: 3
- Stats at Pro Football Reference

Christopher Lee Ivory (born March 22, 1988) is an American former professional football player who was a running back in the National Football League (NFL). He played college football for the Washington State Cougars and Tiffin Dragons and was signed by the New Orleans Saints as an undrafted free agent in 2010. In 2013, Ivory was traded to the New York Jets, where he saw an expanded role, eventually becoming the team's primary running back by 2014 and being named to the Pro Bowl in 2015. He then spent the next three seasons as a backup with the Jacksonville Jaguars and Buffalo Bills.

== Early life ==
Ivory earned letters in both football and track and field in high school at Longview High School in Longview, Texas, playing on the Lobos team that included future NFL players Trent Williams, Malcolm Kelly, and Robert Henson. He was listed as a two-star recruit by both Rivals.com and Scout.com.

== College career ==
=== Washington State ===
Ivory played three years for Washington State from 2006 to 2008. Limited by injuries, in 22 games he had 91 carries for 534 yards and four touchdowns, as well as 23 kickoff returns averaging 22.8 yards. When the coaches who had recruited him were replaced by a new coaching staff, Ivory found himself far down on the Cougars' depth chart. In August 2009, Ivory was dismissed from the Washington State team for violating team rules.

==== Statistics ====
Year	School	Conf	Class	Pos	G	Rushing				Receiving			
Year	School	Conf	Class	Pos	G	Att	Yds	Avg	TD	Rec	Yds	Avg	TD
2006	Washington State	Pac-10	FR	RB	9	3	85	28.3	1	0	0	0.0	0
2007	Washington State	Pac-10	SO	RB	8	60	313	5.2	2	13	50	3.8	0
2008	Washington State	Pac-10	JR	RB	5	28	136	4.9	1	2	1	0.5	0
Career	Washington State				22	91	534	5.9	4	15	51	3.4	0

=== Tiffin University ===
Ivory then transferred to Tiffin University, a Division II school in Tiffin, Ohio, whose team was coached by Dave Walkosky, a former Washington State assistant coach. In Ivory's final year of college football, he had 39 rushes for 223 yards in five games before suffering a season-ending knee injury. Walkosky attempted to obtain a medical redshirt exemption to allow Ivory to play another year, but this was unsuccessful. Despite his brief stint at Tiffin University, Ivory's performance and speed attracted attention from NFL scouts, and he was thought to have a chance of becoming the first Tiffin University player to be drafted by the NFL. The Saints became interested in Ivory, despite his injuries, after one of their scouts was impressed by Walkosky's enthusiastic recommendations.

== Professional career ==
=== Pre-draft ===
Ivory became eligible for the 2010 NFL Draft after his season, but he did not receive an invitation to perform at the NFL Combine. On March 16, 2010, Ivory attended Toledo's Pro Day and completed all of the combine and positional drills. At the conclusion of the pre-draft process, Ivory was projected to go undrafted by NFL draft experts and scouts. He was ranked as the 32nd best running back prospect in the draft by DraftScout.com.

Pre-draft measurables
Height	Weight	40-yard dash	10-yard split	20-yard split	20-yard shuttle	Three-cone drill	Vertical jump	Broad jump
5 ft 11 1/2 in (1.82 m)	222 lb (101 kg)	4.48 s	1.54 s	2.60 s	4.60 s	7.20 s	36 in (0.91 m)	9 ft 11 in (3.02 m)
All values from Toledo's Pro Day

=== New Orleans Saints ===
On April 27, 2010, the New Orleans Saints signed Ivory as an undrafted free agent to a three-year, $1.22 million contract. He had an impressive performance in training camp and preseason games, highlighted by a strong performance against the San Diego Chargers that included a 76-yard touchdown on a swing pass.

Early season injuries to Reggie Bush and Pierre Thomas left Ivory as the Saints' starting running back. He had a breakout game in Week 6 against Tampa Bay Buccaneers: his 158 yards on 15 carries were the most by any Saints running back since Deuce McAllister rushed for 165 yards in a 2003 game, and the most by a Saints rookie since a 179-yard effort by Ricky Williams in 1999. The performance earned him awards as both Pepsi NFL Rookie of the Week and FedEx Ground Player of the Week. Another strong performance in Week 11, with 23 rushes for 99 yards in a 34–19 win over the Seattle Seahawks, led Seahawks coach Pete Carroll to call Ivory "a freaking stud out there." Ivory ended the regular season with 137 rushes for 716 yards, which led the team, and five touchdowns, but he also suffered repeated injuries during the year; after a foot injury in the Saints' last regular season game, he was placed on the injured reserve list and was unable to play in the postseason. He was named to the NFL All-Rookie Team.

Ivory spent the first six games of the 2011 season on the PUP list; after he was activated, he played in six games, with 79 rushes for 374 yards, and 22 carries for 70 yards in the Saints' two playoff games against the Detroit Lions in the Wild Card Round and the San Francisco 49ers in the Divisional Round. In May 2012, the Saints paid Ivory an additional signing bonus to make up for the income he lost on the PUP list. He became a restricted free agent after the 2012 season. He appeared in six games in the 2012 season and recorded 40 carries for 217 rushing yards and two rushing touchdowns.

=== New York Jets ===
Ivory was traded to the New York Jets on April 26, 2013, during the 2013 NFL draft for the Jets' fourth round draft pick (106th overall). He signed a three-year contract worth $10 million. He made his Jets debut in the season opener against the Tampa Bay Buccaneers. On October 20, against the New England Patriots, he had 34 carries for 104 yards. On October 3, he had 139 rushing yards and a rushing touchdown against the New Orleans Saints. Overall, in the 2013 season, he had 833 rushing yards, three rushing touchdowns, and ten receiving yards.

On September 7, 2014, he had a 71-yard touchdown run as part of a 102-yard performance against the Oakland Raiders in the season opener. It was the second longest touchdown run in Jets history; Bruce Harper ran for 78 yards in 1983. On October 16, against the New England Patriots, he had 107 rushing yards and a touchdown. Ten days later, he had his lone two-touchdown performance of the season against the Buffalo Bills. Overall, he finished the 2014 season with 821 rushing yards, six rushing touchdowns, and 18 receptions for 123 yards and a receiving touchdown.

In the 2015 season opener against the Cleveland Browns, Ivory had 91 rushing yards and two rushing touchdowns in the 31–10 victory. On October 4, 2015, during an NFL International Series matchup against the Miami Dolphins at Wembley Stadium, Ivory rushed for 166 yards and a touchdown, setting a career-high in rushing yards. He followed that up with 146 rushing yards and a rushing touchdown against the Washington Redskins. Ivory won the AFC rushing title in the 2015 season beating Latavius Murray by four yards, finishing the year with 1,070 rushing yards and his first Pro Bowl selection. He was ranked 78th by his fellow players on the NFL Top 100 Players of 2016.

=== Jacksonville Jaguars ===
Ivory signed a three-year deal with the Jacksonville Jaguars on March 10, 2016.

On October 16, 2016, Ivory had 11 carries for 32-yards and scored his first rushing touchdown with the team as the Jaguars defeated the Chicago Bears by a score of 17–16. On November 6, he had 107 rushing yards against the Kansas City Chiefs. Overall, he finished the 2016 season with 439 rushing yards, three rushing touchdowns, 20 receptions, and 186 receiving yards.

Ivory entered the 2017 season second on the depth chart behind rookie Leonard Fournette. He played in 14 games with three starts, rushing for 382 yards and one touchdown.

On February 23, 2018, Ivory was released by the Jaguars.

=== Buffalo Bills ===
On March 6, 2018, Ivory signed a two-year contract with the Buffalo Bills for $5.5 million, with $3.25 million guaranteed. In Week 3, against the Minnesota Vikings, he had 126 scrimmage yards in the 27–6 victory. He rushed for 385 yards and one touchdown along with 13 receptions for 205 yards in 2018.

On March 27, 2019, Ivory was released by the Bills.

== NFL career statistics ==
=== Regular season ===
Year	Team	Games		Rushing					Receiving					Fumbles	
Year	Team	GP	GS	Att	Yds	Avg	Lng	TD	Rec	Yds	Avg	Lng	TD	Fum	Lost
2010	NO	12	4	137	716	5.2	55T	5	1	17	17.0	17	0	4	2
2011	NO	6	2	79	374	4.7	35T	1	0	0	0.0	0	0	0	0
2012	NO	6	2	40	217	5.4	56T	2	2	15	7.5	13	0	0	0
2013	NYJ	15	6	182	833	4.6	69	3	2	10	5.0	12	0	2	0
2014	NYJ	16	10	198	821	4.1	71T	6	18	123	6.8	23	1	2	1
2015	NYJ	15	14	247	1,070	4.3	58	7	30	217	7.2	36	1	4	2
2016	JAX	11	1	117	439	3.8	42	3	20	186	9.3	37	0	5	3
2017	JAX	14	3	112	382	3.4	34	1	21	175	8.3	29	1	2	2
2018	BUF	13	1	115	385	3.3	21	1	13	205	15.8	55	0	1	0
Total		108	43	1,227	5,237	4.3	71T	29	107	948	8.9	55	3	20	10

=== Postseason ===
Year	Team	Games		Rushing					Receiving					Fumbles	
Year	Team	GP	GS	Att	Yds	Avg	Lng	TD	Rec	Yds	Avg	Lng	TD	Fum	Lost
2011	NO	2	0	22	70	3.2	19	0	0	0	0.0	0	0	0	0
2017	JAX	1	0	1	2	2.0	2	0	0	0	0.0	0	0	0	0
Total		3	0	23	72	3.1	19	0	0	0	0.0	0	0	0	0

=== Career awards and highlights ===
- Pro Bowl selection (2015)
- PFWA All-AFC selection (2015)
- AFC rushing yards leader (2015)
- 4× FedEx Ground Player of the Week
  (Week 6, 2010, Week 7, 2013, Week 4, 2015, Week 6, 2015)
- Pepsi NFL Rookie of the Week (Week 6, 2010)
- NFL All-Rookie Team (2010)
- Ranked No. 78 in the Top 100 Players of 2016
