= 2010 New Orleans Saints season =

NFL team season

- Owner: Tom Benson
- General manager: Mickey Loomis
- Head coach: Sean Payton
- Offensive coordinator: Pete Carmichael Jr.
- Defensive coordinator: Gregg Williams
- Home stadium: Louisiana Superdome

Results
- Record: 11–5
- Division place: 2nd NFC South
- Playoffs: Lost Wild Card Playoffs (at Seahawks) 36–41
- All-Pros: 4: G Jahri Evans (1st team); G Carl Nicks (2nd team); S Malcolm Jenkins (2nd team); S Darren Sharper (2nd team)
- Pro Bowlers: 5: QB Drew Brees; G Jahri Evans; G Carl Nicks; MLB Jonathan Vilma; FS Roman Harper

Uniform
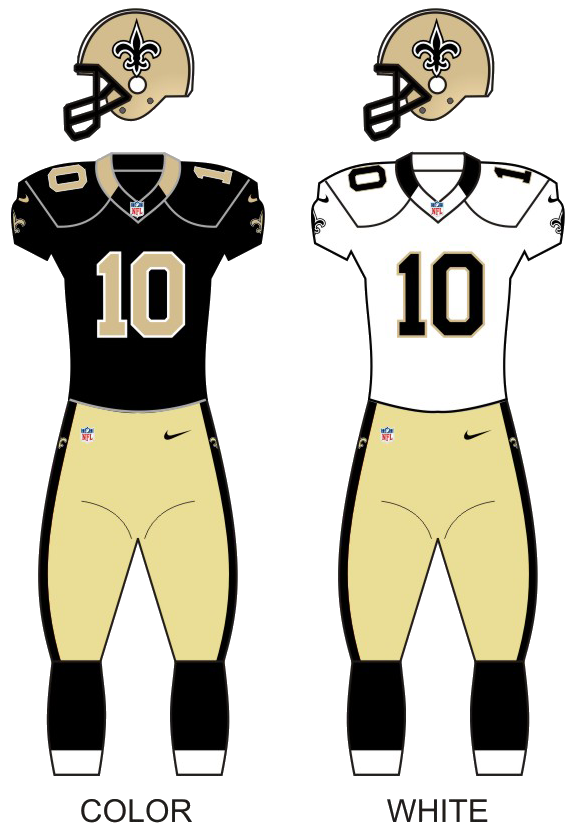

The 2010 season was the New Orleans Saints' 44th in the National Football League (NFL) and their 35th playing home games in the Louisiana Superdome. From 2009, the Saints were coming off their first Super Bowl-winning season and the most successful in franchise history, having begun undefeated for 13 consecutive games only to lose their three final regular season encounters to finish 13–3. The Saints also attempted to win the NFC South Division title for the third time in history, earn their first consecutive postseason berths since 1991, and successfully defend their conference and league championships. The Saints failed to improve on their 13–3 record, finishing 11–5 and qualifying for the playoffs as a wild card team. The Saints were eliminated in the first round by the Seattle Seahawks, who were the first team with a losing record (7–9) to qualify for the playoffs and/or win a division title in a full season. Sean Payton served his fifth year as head coach.

This is the first time the Saints made the playoffs in back-to-back seasons since the 1990–92 seasons.

== Offseason ==
=== 2010 NFL draft ===
As the winners of Super Bowl XLIV, the Saints acquired the 32nd pick in the first round and drafted in this order.

New Orleans Saints 2010 NFL Draft selections
| Draft order | | | Player name | Position | Height | Weight | College | Contract | Notes |
| Round | Choice | Overall | Player name | Position | Height | Weight | College | Contract | Notes |
|---|---|---|---|---|---|---|---|---|---|
| 1 | 32 | 32 | Patrick Robinson | CB | 5'11" | 190 lbs | Florida State | 5 Year | |
| 2 | 32 | 64 | Charles Brown | OT | 6'5" | 303 lbs | USC | 4 Year | |
| 3 | 31 | 95 | Jimmy Graham | TE | 6'6" | 260 lbs | Miami | 4 Year | |
| 4 | 25 | 123 | Al Woods | DT | 6'4" | 314 lbs | LSU | 4 Year | |
| 5 | 27 | 158 | Matt Tennant | C | 6'5" | 300 lbs | Boston College | 4 Year | |
| 6 | 32 | 201 | Traded to the Arizona Cardinals | | | | | | |
| 7 | 32 | 239 | Sean Canfield | QB | 6'4" | 214 lbs | Oregon State | N/A | |

=== Roster signings ===
All signings were to active roster, except where otherwise noted.

| Pos. | Player | Date | Notes |
|---|---|---|---|
| CB | Greg Fassitt | February 12, 2010 | |
| TE | Tyler Lorenzen | February 12, 2010 | |
| OT | Jermey Parnell | February 12, 2010 | |
| WR | Matt Simon | February 12, 2010 | |
| G | Na'Shan Goddard | February 18, 2010 | |
| CB | Glenn Sharpe | February 18, 2010 | |
| DT | Earl Heyman | February 18, 2010 | |
| G | Tim Duckworth | February 19, 2010 | |
| FB | Zak Keasey | February 23, 2010 | |
| DE | Alex Brown | April 7, 2010 | |
| DE | Jimmy Wilkerson | April 20, 2010 | |
| OLB | Clint Ingram | May 19, 2010 | |

=== Roster releases ===
| Pos. | Player | Date | Notes |
|---|---|---|---|
| WR | D'Juan Woods | February 16, 2010 | Released after being placed on injured reserve prior to the 2009 season |
| G | Jamar Nesbit | March 4, 2010 | |
| LB | Mark Simoneau | March 4, 2010 | |
| DE | Charles Grant | March 5, 2010 | |

== Schedule ==
=== Preseason ===
| Week | Date | Opponent | Result | Record | Venue | Recap |
|---|---|---|---|---|---|---|
| 1 | August 12 | at New England Patriots | L 24–27 | 0–1 | Gillette Stadium | Recap |
| 2 | August 21 | Houston Texans | W 38–20 | 1–1 | Louisiana Superdome | Recap |
| 3 | August 27 | San Diego Chargers | W 36–21 | 2–1 | Louisiana Superdome | Recap |
| 4 | September 2 | at Tennessee Titans | L 24–27 | 2–2 | LP Field | Recap |

=== Regular season ===
| Week | Date | Opponent | Result | Record | Venue | Recap |
|---|---|---|---|---|---|---|
| 1 | September 9 | Minnesota Vikings | W 14–9 | 1–0 | Louisiana Superdome | Recap |
| 2 | September 20 | at San Francisco 49ers | W 25–22 | 2–0 | Candlestick Park | Recap |
| 3 | September 26 | Atlanta Falcons | L 24–27 (OT) | 2–1 | Louisiana Superdome | Recap |
| 4 | October 3 | Carolina Panthers | W 16–14 | 3–1 | Louisiana Superdome | Recap |
| 5 | October 10 | at Arizona Cardinals | L 20–30 | 3–2 | University of Phoenix Stadium | Recap |
| 6 | October 17 | at Tampa Bay Buccaneers | W 31–6 | 4–2 | Raymond James Stadium | Recap |
| 7 | October 24 | Cleveland Browns | L 17–30 | 4–3 | Louisiana Superdome | Recap |
| 8 | October 31 | Pittsburgh Steelers | W 20–10 | 5–3 | Louisiana Superdome | Recap |
| 9 | November 7 | at Carolina Panthers | W 34–3 | 6–3 | Bank of America Stadium | Recap |
| 10 | Bye | | | | | |
| 11 | November 21 | Seattle Seahawks | W 34–19 | 7–3 | Louisiana Superdome | Recap |
| 12 | November 25 | at Dallas Cowboys | W 30–27 | 8–3 | Cowboys Stadium | Recap |
| 13 | December 5 | at Cincinnati Bengals | W 34–30 | 9–3 | Paul Brown Stadium | Recap |
| 14 | December 12 | St. Louis Rams | W 31–13 | 10–3 | Louisiana Superdome | Recap |
| 15 | December 19 | at Baltimore Ravens | L 24–30 | 10–4 | M&T Bank Stadium | Recap |
| 16 | December 27 | at Atlanta Falcons | W 17–14 | 11–4 | Georgia Dome | Recap |
| 17 | January 2 | Tampa Bay Buccaneers | L 13–23 | 11–5 | Louisiana Superdome | Recap |

== Standings ==
NFC South
| | W | L | T | PCT | DIV | CONF | PF | PA | STK |
|---|---|---|---|---|---|---|---|---|---|
| ^{(1)} Atlanta Falcons | 13 | 3 | 0 | .813 | 5–1 | 10–2 | 414 | 288 | W1 |
| ^{(5)} New Orleans Saints | 11 | 5 | 0 | .688 | 4–2 | 9–3 | 384 | 307 | L1 |
| Tampa Bay Buccaneers | 10 | 6 | 0 | .625 | 3–3 | 8–4 | 343 | 318 | W2 |
| Carolina Panthers | 2 | 14 | 0 | .125 | 0–6 | 2–10 | 196 | 408 | L2 |

== Preseason results ==
=== Preseason Week 1: at New England Patriots ===
| Quarter | 1 | 2 | 3 | 4 | Total |
|---|---|---|---|---|---|
| Saints | 0 | 7 | 14 | 3 | 24 |
| Patriots | 10 | 7 | 7 | 3 | 27 |

at Gillette Stadium, Foxborough, Massachusetts

- Date: Thursday, August 12, 2010
- Game weather: 71 °F (22 °C), cloudy and cool
- Game attendance: 68,756
- Recap

=== Preseason Week 2: vs Houston Texans ===
| Quarter | 1 | 2 | 3 | 4 | Total |
|---|---|---|---|---|---|
| Texans | 0 | 10 | 3 | 7 | 20 |
| Saints | 14 | 14 | 7 | 3 | 38 |

at Louisiana Superdome, New Orleans, Louisiana

- Date: Saturday, August 21, 2010
- Game weather: Indoor Stadium
- Game attendance: 70,025
- Recap

=== Preseason Week 3: vs San Diego Chargers ===
| Quarter | 1 | 2 | 3 | 4 | Total |
|---|---|---|---|---|---|
| Chargers | 7 | 7 | 0 | 7 | 21 |
| Saints | 7 | 10 | 3 | 16 | 36 |

at Louisiana Superdome, New Orleans, Louisiana

- Date: Friday August 27, 2010
- Game weather: Indoor Stadium
- Game attendance: 70,025
- Recap

=== Preseason Week 4: at Tennessee Titans ===
| Quarter | 1 | 2 | 3 | 4 | Total |
|---|---|---|---|---|---|
| Saints | 3 | 7 | 3 | 11 | 24 |
| Titans | 7 | 6 | 0 | 14 | 27 |

at LP Field, Nashville, Tennessee

- Date: Thursday September 2, 2010
- Game weather: 89 °F (32 °C) Cloudy
- Game attendance: 69,143
- Recap

== Regular season results ==
=== Week 1: vs. Minnesota Vikings ===
NFL Kickoff game

Week 1: Minnesota Vikings at New Orleans Saints – Game summary

| Quarter | 1 | 2 | 3 | 4 | Total |
|---|---|---|---|---|---|
| Vikings | 0 | 9 | 0 | 0 | 9 |
| Saints | 7 | 0 | 7 | 0 | 14 |

at Louisiana Superdome, New Orleans, Louisiana

- Date: September 9
- Game time: 7:30 p.m.
- Game weather: None (domed stadium)
- Game attendance: 70,051
- Referee: Terry McAulay (77)
- TV announcers (NBC): Al Michaels & Cris Collinsworth
- Recap, Gamebook

Game information

First quarter

- NO – Devery Henderson 29-yard pass from Drew Brees (Garrett Hartley kick), 12:56. Saints 7–0. Drive: 5 plays, 77 yards, 2:04.

Second quarter

- MIN – Ryan Longwell 41-yard field goal, 5:28. Saints 7–3. Drive: 16 plays, 66 yards, 9:25.
- MIN – Visanthe Shiancoe 20-yard pass from Brett Favre (kick blocked), 0:34. Vikings 9–7. Drive: 5 plays, 64 yards, 0:45.

Third quarter

- NO – Pierre Thomas 1-yard run (Garrett Hartley kick), 6:13. Saints 14–9. Drive: 11 plays, 74 yards, 6:43.

Fourth quarter

- No scoring plays

Passing

- MIN – Brett Favre – 15/27, 171 yards, TD
- NO – Drew Brees – 27/36, 237 yards, TD

Rushing

- MIN – Adrian Peterson – 19 rushes, 87 yards
- NO – Pierre Thomas – 19 rushes, 71 yards, TD

Receiving

- MIN – Visanthe Shiancoe – 4 rec, 76 yards
- NO – Marques Colston – 5 rec, 62 yards

With their Super Bowl title to defend, the Saints began their season at home in the annual Kickoff Game against the Minnesota Vikings, in a rematch of last season's NFC Championship Game. New Orleans would strike first in the opening quarter with quarterback Drew Brees hooking up with wide receiver Devery Henderson on a 29-yard touchdown pass. The Vikings would take the lead in the second quarter as kicker Ryan Longwell made a 41-yard field goal, followed by quarterback Brett Favre's 20-yard touchdown pass to tight end Visanthe Shiancoe (with a blocked PAT).

In the third quarter, the Saints would regain the lead with a 1-yard touchdown run from running back Pierre Thomas. From there, New Orleans' defense would prevent any further progress from Minnesota.

With the win, New Orleans began their season at 1–0.

=== Week 2: at San Francisco 49ers ===
Week 2: New Orleans Saints at San Francisco 49ers – Game summary

| Quarter | 1 | 2 | 3 | 4 | Total |
|---|---|---|---|---|---|
| Saints | 9 | 0 | 7 | 9 | 25 |
| 49ers | 0 | 7 | 7 | 8 | 22 |

at Candlestick Park, San Francisco, California

- Date: September 20
- Game time: 7:30 pm. CDT
- Game weather: 65 °F (18 °C) (Sunny)
- Game attendance: 69,732
- Referee: Alberto Riveron
- TV announcers (ESPN): Mike Tirico, Jon Gruden, Ron Jaworski, Suzy Kolber and Michele Tafoya
- Recap

Game information

First quarter

- NO – David Baas fumble out of bounds in end zone for a safety, Saints 2–0.
- NO – Reggie Bush 6-yard pass from Drew Brees (Garrett Hartley kick), Saints 9–0, Drive: 7 plays, 46 yards, 3:55.

Second quarter

- SF – Frank Gore 12-yard pass from Alex Smith (Joe Nedney kick), Saints 9–7, Drive: 12 plays, 85 yards, 5:43.

Third quarter

- SF – Anthony Dixon 2-yard run (Joe Nedney kick), 49ers 14–9, Drive: 6 plays, 86 yards, 3:36.
- NO – David Thomas 3-yard pass from Drew Brees (Garrett Hartley kick), Saints 16–14, Drive: 10 plays, 61 yards, 5:08.

Fourth quarter

- NO – Garrett Hartley 46-yard field goal, Saints 19–14, Drive: 4 plays, 7 yards, 1:29.
- NO – Garrett Hartley 19-yard field goal, Saints 22–14, Drive: 6 plays, 13 yards, 3:15.
- SF – Frank Gore 7-yard run (Alex Smith – Vernon Davis pass), Tied 22–22, Drive: 8 plays, 82 yards, 0:53.
- NO – Garrett Hartley 37-yard field goal, Saints 25–22, Drive: 7 plays, 51 yards, 1:19.

Top passers

- NO – Drew Brees – 28/38, 254 yards, 2 touchdowns
- SF – Alex Smith – 23/32, 275 yards, 1 touchdown, 2 interceptions

Top rushers

- NO – Pierre Thomas – 18 rushes, 46 yards
- SF – Frank Gore – 20 rushes, 112 yards, 1 touchdown

Top receivers

- NO – Marques Colston – 5 receptions, 67 yards
- SF – Vernon Davis – 4 receptions, 78 yards

Top tacklers

- NO – Jonathan Vilma – 7 tackles, 3 assists, 1 forced fumble
- SF – Patrick Willis – 8 tackles, 1 assist, 1.0 sack

Coming off their home win over the Vikings, the Saints flew to Candlestick Park for a Week 2 Monday Night duel with the San Francisco 49ers. New Orleans would deliver the opening punch in the first quarter as 49ers center David Baas' high snap deep within San Francisco territory went out of the back of the endzone for a safety. The Saints would add onto their lead as quarterback Drew Brees hooked up with running back Reggie Bush on a 6-yard touchdown pass. The 49ers would answer in the second quarter as quarterback Alex Smith found running back Frank Gore on a 12-yard touchdown pass.

San Francisco would take the lead with running back Anthony Dixon's 2-yard touchdown run, yet New Orleans would respond with Brees' 3-yard touchdown pass to tight end David Thomas. The Saints would add onto their lead in the fourth quarter as kicker Garrett Hartley made a 46-yard and a 19-yard field goal. The 49ers would strike back as Gore got a 7-yard touchdown run, followed by Smith's 2-point conversion pass to tight end Vernon Davis. In the end, New Orleans got the last laugh as Hartley booted the game-ending 37-yard field goal.

With the win, the Saints improved to 2–0.

=== Week 3: vs. Atlanta Falcons ===
Week 3: Atlanta Falcons at New Orleans Saints – Game summary

| Quarter | 1 | 2 | 3 | 4 | OT | Total |
|---|---|---|---|---|---|---|
| Falcons | 7 | 7 | 3 | 7 | 3 | 27 |
| Saints | 14 | 0 | 7 | 3 | 0 | 24 |

at Louisiana Superdome, New Orleans, Louisiana

- Date: September 26
- Game time: 1:00 pm. EDT
- Game weather: None (dome stadium)
- Game attendance: 70,051
- Referee: Walt Anderson
- TV announcers (FOX): Thom Brennaman, Brian Billick and Charissa Thompson
- Recap

Game information

First quarter

- NO – Jeremy Shockey 2-yard pass from Drew Brees (Garrett Hartley kick), Saints 7–0, Drive: 3 plays, 6 yards, 1:22.
- ATL – Tony Gonzalez 13-yard pass from Matt Ryan (Matt Bryant kick), Tied 7–7, Drive: 9 plays, 80 yards, 4:49.
- NO – Lance Moore 80-yard pass from Drew Brees (Garrett Hartley kick), Saints 14–7, Drive: 4 plays, 86 yards, 2:01.

Second quarter

- ATL – Michael Turner 1-yard run (Matt Bryant kick), Tied 14–14, Drive: 19 plays, 72 yards, 10:39.

Third quarter

- ATL – Matt Bryant 23-yard field goal, Falcons 17–14, Drive: 11 plays, 63 yards, 5:04.
- NO – Lance Moore 16-yard pass from Drew Brees (Garrett Hartley kick), Saints 21–17, Drive: 5 plays, 42 yards, 2:28.

Fourth quarter

- ATL – Roddy White 22-yard pass from Matt Ryan (Matt Bryant kick), Falcons 24–21, Drive: 9 plays, 80 yards, 5:44.
- NO – Garrett Hartley 32-yard field goal, Tied 24–24, Drive: 11 plays, 48 yards, 3:28.

Overtime

- ATL – Matt Bryant 46-yard field goal, Falcons 27–24, Drive: 12 plays, 52 yards, 7:02.

Top passers

- ATL – Matt Ryan – 19/30, 228 yards, 2 touchdowns
- NO – Drew Brees – 30/38, 365 yards, 3 touchdowns, 2 interceptions

Top rushers

- ATL – Michael Turner – 30 rushes, 114 yards, 1 touchdown
- NO – Pierre Thomas – 9 rushes, 30 yards

Top receivers

- ATL – Tony Gonzalez – 8 receptions, 110 yards, 1 touchdown
- NO – Lance Moore – 6 receptions, 149 yards, 2 touchdowns

Top tacklers

- ATL – Curtis Lofton – 6 tackles, 2 assists
- NO – Jonathan Vilma – 8 tackles, 3 assists

Hoping to increase their winning streak the Saints played inside their dome for an NFC South rivalry match against the Falcons. The Saints took the early lead when QB Drew Brees made a 2-yard TD pass to TE Jeremy Shockey. The Falcons replied with QB Matt Ryan making a 13-yard TD pass to TE Tony Gonzalez. The Saints re-took the lead with Brees finding WR Lance Moore on an 80-yard TD pass. But the Falcons replied in the second quarter with RB Michael Turner making a 1-yard TD run. The Saints trailed for the first time in the game when kicker Matt Bryant made a 23-yard field goal. But they took the lead with Brees finding Moore again on a 16-yard TD pass. The Falcons would score when Ryan made a 22-yard TD pass to WR Roddy White. The Saints would tie the game with kicker Garrett Hartley making a 32-yard field goal. At overtime, the decision was made when Matt Bryant hit a 46-yard field goal to give the Saints their first loss of the season, bringing their record down to 2–1.

=== Week 4: vs. Carolina Panthers ===
Week 4: Carolina Panthers at New Orleans Saints – Game summary

| Quarter | 1 | 2 | 3 | 4 | Total |
|---|---|---|---|---|---|
| Panthers | 0 | 7 | 7 | 0 | 14 |
| Saints | 0 | 10 | 3 | 3 | 16 |

at Louisiana Superdome, New Orleans, Louisiana

- Date: October 3
- Game time: 1:00 pm. EDT
- Game weather: None (dome stadium)
- Game attendance: 70,016
- Referee: John Parry
- TV announcers (FOX): Kenny Albert, Daryl Johnston and Tony Siragusa
- Recap

Game information

First quarter

- No scoring plays

Second quarter

- NO – Lance Moore 4-yard pass from Drew Brees (John Carney kick), Saints 7–0, Drive: 6 plays, 76 yards, 2:27.
- CAR – Jonathan Stewart 55-yard pass from Jimmy Clausen (John Kasay kick), Tied 7–7, Drive: 5 plays, 72 yards, 2:40.
- NO – John Carney 32-yard field goal, Saints 10–7, Drive: 13 plays, 63 yards, 4:32.

Third quarter

- CAR – DeAngelo Williams 39-yard run (John Kasay kick), Panthers 14–10, Drive: 7 plays, 80 yards, 2:55.
- NO – John Carney 32-yard field goal, Panthers 14–13, Drive: 5 plays, 15 yards, 2:49.

Fourth quarter

- NO – John Carney 25-yard field goal, Saints 16–14, Drive: 18 plays, 86 yards, 9:25.

Top passers

- CAR – Jimmy Clausen – 11/21, 146 yards, 1 touchdown
- NO – Drew Brees – 33/48, 275 yards, 1 touchdown

Top rushers

- CAR – DeAngelo Williams – 13 rushes, 86 yards, 1 touchdown
- NO – Chris Ivory – 12 rushes, 67 yards

Top receivers

- CAR – Jonathan Stewart – 1 reception, 55 yards, 1 touchdown
- NO – Devery Henderson – 6 receptions, 59 yards

Top tacklers

- CAR – James Anderson – 12 tackles, 2 assists, 1.0 sack, 1 forced fumble
- NO – Usama Young – 5 tackles, 1 assist, 1.0 sack

The Saints fourth game was inside their dome for an NFC south rivalry match against the Panthers. In the 1st quarter New Orleans took the lead as QB Drew Brees completed a 4-yard TD pass to WR Lance Moore. Carolina replied with QB Jimmy Clausen making a 55-yard TD pass to RB Jonathan Stewart. The Saints took the lead when kicker John Carney nailed a 32-yard field goal, but fell behind when RB DeAngelo Williams made a 39-yard TD run. Then John Carney made two field goals to give the Saints the win. He made a 32-yard field goal in the 3rd quarter and a 25-yard field goal in the 4th.

With the win, the Saints improved to 3–1.

=== Week 5: at Arizona Cardinals ===
Week 5: New Orleans Saints at Arizona Cardinals – Game summary

| Quarter | 1 | 2 | 3 | 4 | Total |
|---|---|---|---|---|---|
| Saints | 10 | 3 | 0 | 7 | 20 |
| Cardinals | 0 | 3 | 17 | 10 | 30 |

at University of Phoenix Stadium, Glendale, Arizona

- Date: October 10
- Game time: 3:05 pm. CDT
- Game weather: None (retractable roof closed)
- Game attendance: 62,621
- Referee: Tony Corrente
- TV announcers (FOX): Chris Rose and Kurt Warner
- Recap

Game information

First quarter

- NO – John Carney 31-yard field goal, Saints 3–0, Drive: 7 plays, 36 yards, 3:07.
- NO – Jeremy Shockey 1-yard pass from Drew Brees (John Carney kick), Saints 10–0, Drive: 11 plays, 76 yards, 5:32.

Second quarter

- ARI – Jay Feely 37-yard field goal, Saints 10–3, Drive: 10 plays, 31 yards, 5:15.
- ARI – Levi Brown 2-yard fumble recovery (Jay Feely kick), Tied 10–10, Drive: 3 plays, 2 yards, 1:02.
- NO – John Carney 32-yard field goal, Saints 13–10, Drive: 6 plays, 58 yards, 1:09.

Third quarter

- ARI – Jay Feely 44-yard field goal, Tied 13–13, Drive: 7 plays, 34 yards, 4:17.

Fourth quarter

- ARI – Jay Feely 29-yard field goal, Cardinals 16–13, Drive: 10 plays, 69 yards, 4:48.
- ARI – Kerry Rhodes 27-yard fumble return (Jay Feely kick), Cardinals 23–13.
- NO – Robert Meachem 35-yard pass from Drew Brees (John Carney kick), Cardinals 23–20, Drive: 7 plays, 80 yards, 1:36.
- ARI – Dominique Rodgers-Cromartie 28-yard interception return (Jay Feely kick), Cardinals 30–20.

Top passers

- NO – Drew Brees – 24/39, 279 yards, 2 touchdowns, 3 interceptions
- ARI – Max Hall – 17/27, 168 yards, 1 interception

Top rushers

- NO – Ladell Betts – 10 rushes, 44 yards
- ARI – Beanie Wells – 20 rushes, 35 yards

Top receivers

- NO – Marques Colston – 7 receptions, 97 yards
- ARI – Larry Fitzgerald – 7 receptions, 93 yards

Top tacklers

- NO – Patrick Robinson – 8 tackles
- ARI – Kerry Rhodes, Daryl Washington – 6 tackles

Coming off their close win over the Panthers the Saints flew to University of Phoenix Stadium for an NFC duel with the Cardinals. In the first quarter the Saints took the early lead as kicker John Carney nailed a 31-yard field goal, followed by QB Drew Brees completing a 1-yard TD pass to TE Jeremy Shockey. The Cardinals replied with kicker Jay Feely making a 37-yard field goal, followed by OT Levi Brown recovering a fumble and returning it 2 yards for a touchdown. In the third quarter the Saints fell behind when Feely got a 44-yard field goal, followed the 4th quarter by Feely's 29-yard field goal. Then FS Kerry Rhodes recovered a fumble and ran 27 yards to the end zone for a touchdown. Then the Saints replied with Brees making a 35-yard TD pass to WR Robert Meachem, but had more problems when Brees' pass was intercepted by CB Dominique Rodgers-Cromartie and returned 28 yards to the end zone for a touchdown.

With the loss, the Saints fell to 3–2.

=== Week 6: at Tampa Bay Buccaneers ===
Week 6: New Orleans Saints at Tampa Bay Buccaneers – Game summary

| Quarter | 1 | 2 | 3 | 4 | Total |
|---|---|---|---|---|---|
| Saints | 7 | 10 | 7 | 7 | 31 |
| Buccaneers | 0 | 0 | 0 | 6 | 6 |

at Raymond James Stadium, Tampa, Florida

- Date: October 17
- Game time: 12:00 pm. CDT
- Game weather: 81 °F (27 °C) (Clear)
- Game attendance: 51,759
- Referee: Clete Blakeman
- TV announcers (Fox): Sam Rosen and Tim Ryan
- Recap

Game information

First quarter

- NO – Lance Moore 41-yard pass from Drew Brees (Garrett Hartley kick), Saints 7–0, Drive: 7 plays, 94 yards, 4:36.

Second quarter

- NO – Robert Meachem 42-yard pass from Drew Brees (Garrett Hartley kick), Saints 14–0, Drive: 9 plays, 80 yards, 4:39.
- NO – Garrett Hartley 27-yard field goal, Saints 17–0, Drive: 11 plays, 77 yards, 4:31.

Third quarter

- NO – Heath Evans 4-yard pass from Drew Brees (Garrett Hartley kick), Saints 24–0, Drive: 8 plays, 46 yards, 4:17.

Fourth quarter

- TB – Micheal Spurlock 2-yard pass from Josh Freeman (pass failed), Saints 24–6, Drive: 14 plays, 88 yards, 6:13.
- NO – Ladell Betts 1-yard run (Garrett Hartley kick), Saints 31–6, Drive: 7 plays, 45 yards, 3:41.

Top passers

- NO – Drew Brees – 21/32, 263 yards, 3 touchdowns, 1 interception
- TB – Josh Freeman – 25/43, 219 yards, 1 touchdown

Top rushers

- NO – Chris Ivory – 15 rushes, 158 yards
- TB – Cadillac Williams – 10 rushes, 18 yards

Top receivers

- NO – Robert Meachem – 4 receptions, 71 yards, 1 touchdown
- TB – Cadillac Williams – 7 receptions, 63 yards

Top tacklers

- NO – Roman Harper – 7 tackles, 2 forced fumbles
- TB – Sean Jones – 8 tackles

Hoping to rebound from their loss to the Cardinals the Saints flew to Raymond James Stadium for an NFC South rivalry match against the Buccaneers. In the first quarter New Orleans took the lead when QB Drew Brees completed a 41-yard TD pass to WR Lance Moore. Followed in the second quarter by Brees making a 42-yard TD pass to WR Robert Meachem. This was followed by kicker Garrett Hartley nailing a 27-yard field goal. The Saints increased their lead when QB Drew Brees made a 4-yard TD pass to FB Heath Evans. Tampa Bay scored in the fourth quarter with QB Josh Freeman making a 2-yard TD pass to WR Micheal Spurlock (With a failed 2-point conversion), but the Saints pulled away as RB Ladell Betts got a 1-yard TD run.

With the win, the Saints improve to 4–2.

=== Week 7: vs. Cleveland Browns ===
Week 7: Cleveland Browns at New Orleans Saints – Game summary

| Quarter | 1 | 2 | 3 | 4 | Total |
|---|---|---|---|---|---|
| Browns | 10 | 10 | 0 | 10 | 30 |
| Saints | 0 | 3 | 0 | 14 | 17 |

at Louisiana Superdome, New Orleans, Louisiana

- Date: October 24
- Game time: 1:00 pm. EDT
- Game weather: None (domed stadium)
- Game attendance: 70,077
- Referee: Walt Coleman
- TV announcers (CBS): Kevin Harlan and Solomon Wilcots
- Recap

Game information

First quarter

- CLE – (10:25) Phil Dawson 23-yard field goal, Browns 3–0, Drive: 6 plays, 14 yards, 2:43.
- CLE – (6:48) Peyton Hillis 4-yard run (Phil Dawson kick), Browns 10–0, Drive: 4 plays, 56 yards, 1:32.

Second quarter

- NO – (5:32) Garrett Hartley 32-yard field goal, Browns 10–3, Drive: 10 plays, 44 yards, 4:21.
- CLE – (2:18) Phil Dawson 21-yard field goal, Browns 13–3, Drive: 8 plays, 75 yards, 3:14.
- CLE – (1:49) David Bowens 30-yard interception return (Phil Dawson kick), Browns 20–3.

Third quarter

Fourth quarter

- NO – (13:29) David Thomas 11-yard pass from Drew Brees (Garrett Hartley kick), Browns 20–10, Drive: 14 plays, 89 yards, 8:33.
- CLE – (5:55) Phil Dawson 38-yard field goal, Browns 23–10, Drive: 13 plays, 50 yards, 7:34.
- CLE – (3:33) David Bowens 64-yard interception return (Phil Dawson kick), Browns 30–10.
- NO – (1:38) Marques Colston 8-yard pass from Drew Brees (Garrett Hartley kick), Browns 30–17, Drive: 11 plays, 76 yards, 1:55.

Top passers

- CLE – Colt McCoy – 9/16, 74 yards
- NO – Drew Brees – 37/56, 356 yards, 2 touchdowns, 4 interceptions

Top rushers

- CLE – Peyton Hillis – 16 rushes, 69 yards, 1 touchdown
- NO – Chris Ivory – 15 rushes, 48 yards

Top receveivers

- CLE – Brian Robiskie – 3 receptions, 25 yards
- NO – Marques Colston – 10 receptions, 112 yards, 1 touchdown

Top tacklers

- CLE – Scott Fujita – 10 tackles, 1 assist, 1 sack, 1 interception
- NO – Malcolm Jenkins – 8 tackles, 1 assist

With the loss, the Saints fell to 4–3.

=== Week 8: vs. Pittsburgh Steelers ===
Week 8: Pittsburgh Steelers at New Orleans Saints – Game summary

| Quarter | 1 | 2 | 3 | 4 | Total |
|---|---|---|---|---|---|
| Steelers | 0 | 3 | 0 | 7 | 10 |
| Saints | 0 | 3 | 3 | 14 | 20 |

at Louisiana Superdome, New Orleans, Louisiana

- Date: October 31
- Game time: 8:20 pm. EDT
- Game weather: indoors
- Game attendance: 70,011
- Referee: Pete Morelli
- TV announcers (NBC): Al Michaels, Cris Collinsworth and Andrea Kremer
- Game Book Recap

Game information

First quarter

Second quarter

- PIT – Jeff Reed 19-yard field goal, Steelers 3–0, Drive: 11 plays, 43 yards, 6:11.
- NO – Garrett Hartley 31-yard field goal, Tied 3–3, Drive: 7 plays, 46 yards, 1:03.

Third quarter

- NO – Garrett Hartley 23-yard field goal, Saints 6–3, Drive: 12 plays, 51 yards, 6:36.

Fourth quarter

- NO – Marques Colston 16-yard pass from Drew Brees (Garrett Hartley kick), Saints 13–3, Drive: 10 plays, 59 yards, 6:13.
- PIT – Rashard Mendenhall 38-yard run (Jeff Reed kick), Saints 13–10, Drive: 4 plays, 68 yards, 2:07.
- NO – Lance Moore 8-yard pass from Drew Brees (Garrett Hartley kick), Saints 20–10, Drive: 8 plays, 55 yards, 3:47.

Top passers

- PIT – Ben Roethlisberger – 17/28, 195 yards, 1 interception
- NO – Drew Brees – 34/44, 305 yards, 2 touchdowns, 1 interception

Top rushers

- PIT – Rashard Mendenhall – 15 rushes, 71 yards, 1 touchdowns
- NO – Julius Jones – 7 receptions, 16 yards

Top receivers

- PIT – Mike Wallace – 3 receptions, 43 yards
- NO – Robert Meachem – 6 receptions, 76 yards

Top tacklers

- PIT – Lawrence Timmons – 11 tackles, 1 assist
- NO – Jonathan Vilma – 6 tackles, 3 assists, 1 sack

Scoring summary

| Quarter | Time | Drive | | | Team | Scoring information | Score | |
| Quarter | Time | Plays | Yards | TOP | Team | Scoring information | Steelers | Saints |
|---|---|---|---|---|---|---|---|---|
| 2 | 9:09 | | 43 | 6:11 | Steelers | 19-yard field goal by Jeff Reed | 3 | 0 |
| 2 | :08 | | 46 | 1:03 | Saints | 31-yard field goal by Garrett Hartley | 3 | 3 |
| 3 | 8:24 | | 51 | 6:36 | Saints | 23-yard field goal by Garrett Hartley | 3 | 6 |
| 4 | 12:55 | | 59 | 6:13 | Saints | Marques Colston 16-yard touchdown reception from Drew Brees, Garrett Hartley kick good | 3 | 13 |
| 4 | 10:48 | | 68 | 2:07 | Steelers | Rashard Mendenhall 38-yard touchdown run, Jeff Reed kick good | 10 | 13 |
| 4 | 2:37 | | 55 | 3:47 | Saints | Lance Moore 8-yard touchdown reception from Drew Brees, Garrett Hartley kick good | 10 | 20 |
| "TOP" = time of possession. For other American football terms, see Glossary of American football. | | | | | | | 10 | 20 |

Hoping to rebound from their home loss to the Browns, the Saints stayed home for a Week 8 interconference duel with the Pittsburgh Steelers on Sunday night. After a scoreless first quarter, New Orleans trailed in the second quarter as Steelers kicker Jeff Reed got a 19-yard field goal. The Saints would answer with a 31-yard field goal from kicker Garrett Hartley.

New Orleans took the lead in the third quarter as Hartley booted a 23-yard field goal. In the fourth quarter, the Saints increased their lead as quarterback Drew Brees found wide receiver Marques Colston on a 16-yard touchdown pass. Pittsburgh responded with running back Rashard Mendenhall getting a 38-yard touchdown run, yet New Orleans came right back as Brees connected with wide receiver Lance Moore on an 8-yard touchdown pass.

With the win, the Saints improved to 5–3.

=== Week 9: at Carolina Panthers ===
Week 9: New Orleans Saints at Carolina Panthers – Game summary

| Quarter | 1 | 2 | 3 | 4 | Total |
|---|---|---|---|---|---|
| Saints | 7 | 10 | 10 | 7 | 34 |
| Panthers | 3 | 0 | 0 | 0 | 3 |

at Bank of America Stadium, Charlotte, North Carolina

- Date: November 7
- Game time: 1:00 pm. EST
- Game weather: 50 °F (10 °C) (Sunny)
- Game attendance: 73,191
- Referee: Ed Hochuli
- TV announcers (Fox): Dick Stockton, Charles Davis, Jim Mora & Laura Okmin
- Recap

Game information

First quarter

- CAR – John Kasay 20-yard field goal, Panthers 3–0, Drive: 6 plays, 26 yards, 2:55.
- NO – Jeremy Shockey 7-yard pass from Drew Brees (Garrett Hartley kick), Saints 7–3, Drive: 7 plays, 27 yards, 3:03.

Second quarter

- NO – Jimmy Graham 19-yard pass from Drew Brees (Garrett Hartley kick), Saints 14–3, Drive: 9 plays, 73 yards, 5:14.
- NO – Garrett Hartley 31-yard field goal, Saints 17–3, Drive: 7 plays, 70 yards, 0:54.

Third quarter

- NO – Garrett Hartley 36-yard field goal, Saints 20–3, Drive: 11 plays, 39 yards, 5:02.
- NO – Jabari Greer 24-yard interception return (Garrett Hartley kick), Saints 27–3.

Fourth quarter

- NO – Ladell Betts 1-yard run (Garrett Hartley kick), Saints 34–3, Drive: 10 plays, 52 yards, 5:20.

Top passers

- NO – Drew Brees – 27/43, 253 yards, 2 touchdowns, 1 interception
- CAR – Jimmy Clausen – 8/18, 47 yards, 1 interception

Top rushers

- NO – Julius Jones – 6 rushes, 68 yards
- CAR – Tyrell Sutton – 7 rushes, 41 yards

Top receivers

- NO – Lance Moore – 6 receptions, 77 yards
- CAR – David Gettis – 2 receptions, 22 yards

Top tacklers

- NO – Roman Harper – 9 tackles, 1.0 sack
- CAR – James Anderson – 9 tackles

Coming off their win over the Steelers the Saints flew to Bank of America Stadium for an NFC South rivalry match against the Panthers. In the first quarter the Saints trailed early after kicker John Kasay made a 20-yard field goal. Then they made a large scoring run to dominate the game after QB Drew Brees completed a 7-yard TD pass to TE Jeremy Shockey. Followed by Brees finding TE Jimmy Graham on a 19-yard TD pass. The lead was extended by kicker Garrett Hartley as he nailed a 31 and a 36-yard field goal. The Saints increased their lead with CB Jabari Greer returning an interception 24 yards for a touchdown. This was followed by RB Ladell Betts getting a 1-yard TD run.

With the win, the Saints headed into their bye week at 6–3 and swept the Panthers for the first time since 2001.

=== Week 11: vs. Seattle Seahawks ===
Week 11: Seattle Seahawks at New Orleans Saints – Game summary

| Quarter | 1 | 2 | 3 | 4 | Total |
|---|---|---|---|---|---|
| Seahawks | 3 | 13 | 0 | 3 | 19 |
| Saints | 7 | 20 | 7 | 0 | 34 |

at Louisiana Superdome, New Orleans, Louisiana

- Date: November 21
- Game time: 3:05 pm. CST
- Game weather: None (dome stadium)
- Game attendance: 70,015
- Referee: Mike Carey
- TV announcers (Fox): Thom Brennaman and Brian Billick
- Recap

Game information

First quarter

- SEA – Olindo Mare 20-yard field goal, Seahawks 3–0, Drive: 9 plays, 80 yards, 4:36.
- NO – Chris Ivory 1-yard run (Garrett Hartley kick), Saints 7–3, Drive: 12 plays, 80 yards, 5:37.

Second quarter

- SEA – Olindo Mare 43-yard field goal, Saints 7–6, Drive: 5 plays, 45 yards, 1:35.
- NO – Marques Colston 23-yard pass from Drew Brees (Garrett Hartley kick), Saints 14–6, Drive: 10 plays, 80 yards, 4:38.
- NO – Robert Meachem 3-yard pass from Drew Brees (Garrett Hartley kick), Saints 21–6, Drive: 8 plays, 42 yards, 4:06.
- SEA – Ben Obomanu 2-yard pass from Matt Hasselbeck (Olindo Mare kick), Saints 21–13, Drive: 12 plays, 69 yards, 3:54.
- NO – Marques Colston 22-yard pass from Drew Brees (kick aborted), Saints 27–13, Drive: 5 plays, 75 yards, 0:54.
- SEA – Olindo Mare 43-yard field goal, Saints 27–16, Drive: 5 plays, 35 yards, 1:00.

Third quarter

- NO – Robert Meachem 32-yard pass from Drew Brees (Garrett Hartley kick), Saints 34–16, Drive: 6 plays, 80 yards, 2:42.

Fourth quarter

- SEA – Olindo Mare 20-yard field goal, Saints 34–19, Drive: 15 plays, 78 yards, 7:02.

Top passers

- SEA – Matt Hasselbeck – 32/44, 366 yards, 1 touchdown
- NO – Drew Brees – 29/43, 382 yards, 4 touchdowns, 2 interceptions

Top rushers

- SEA – Marshawn Lynch – 7 rushes, 36 yards
- NO – Chris Ivory – 23 rushes, 99 yards, 1 touchdown

Top receivers

- SEA – Mike Williams – 6 receptions, 109 yards
- NO – Marques Colston – 8 receptions, 113 yards, 2 touchdowns

Top tacklers

- SEA – David Hawthorne – 10 tackles, 2 assists, 1 interception
- NO – Scott Shanle – 9 tackles, 3 assists, 1 forced fumble

Coming off their bye week the Saints played inside their dome for an NFC duel with the Seahawks. In the first quarter the Saints trailed early as kicker Olindo Mare hit a 20-yard field goal; but they pulled ahead after RB Chris Ivory got a 1-yard TD run. The lead narrowed in the 2nd quarter by Mare getting a 43-yard field goal. The Saints increased it when QB Drew Brees made a 23 and a 3-yard TD pass to WR Marques Colston and WR Robert Meachem. The lead was narrowed again after QB Matt Hasselbeck got a 2-yard TD pass to WR Ben Obomanu; but the Saints replied with Brees throwing a 22-yard TD pass to Colston. The lead narrowed again with Mare hitting a 43-yard field goal. The lead extended in the third quarter with Brees finding Meachem again on a 32-yard TD pass. The Seahawks made the only score of the fourth quarter with Mare making a 20-yard field goal.

With the win, the Saints improved to 7–3.

=== Week 12: at Dallas Cowboys ===
Thanksgiving Day game

Week 12: New Orleans Saints at Dallas Cowboys – Game summary

| Quarter | 1 | 2 | 3 | 4 | Total |
|---|---|---|---|---|---|
| Saints | 17 | 3 | 3 | 7 | 30 |
| Cowboys | 0 | 6 | 14 | 7 | 27 |

at Cowboys Stadium, Arlington, Texas

- Game time: 4:15 pm EST (3:15 pm CST)
- Game weather: None (retractable roof closed)
- Game attendance: 93,985
- Referee: Jerome Boger
- TV announcers (FOX): Joe Buck, Troy Aikman, and Pam Oliver
- Recap

Game information

First quarter

- NO – Chris Ivory 3-yard run (Garrett Hartley kick), Saints 7–0, 'Drive: 4 plays, 80 yards, 1:51.
- NO – Garrett Hartley 50-yard field goal, Saints 10–0, 'Drive: 4 plays, −1 yards, 1:31.
- NO – Chris Ivory 6-yard run (Garrett Hartley kick), Saints 17–0, 'Drive: 6 plays, 58 yards, 2:59.

Second quarter

- DAL – David Buehler 21-yard field goal, Saints 17–3, 'Drive: 14 plays, 79 yards, 7:41.
- NO – Garrett Hartley 45-yard field goal, Saints 20–3, 'Drive: 13 plays, 54 yards, 4:30.
- DAL – David Buehler 53-yard field goal, Saints 20–6, 'Drive: 5 plays, 40 yards, 0:43.

Third quarter

- DAL – Miles Austin 60-yard run (David Buehler kick), Saints 20–13, 'Drive: 2 plays, 68 yards, 0:59.
- NO – Garrett Hartley 28-yard field goal, Saints 23–13, 'Drive: 11 plays, 70 yards, 4:31.
- DAL – Marion Barber 1-yard run (David Buehler kick), Saints 23–20, 'Drive: 6 plays, 15 yards, 2:55.

Fourth quarter

- DAL – Tashard Choice 1-yard run (David Buehler kick), Cowboys 27–23, 'Drive: 5 plays, 89 yards, 1:08.
- NO – Lance Moore 12-yard pass from Drew Brees (Garrett Hartley kick), Saints 30–27, 'Drive: 5 plays, 89 yards, 1:08.

Top passers

- NO – Drew Brees – 23/39, 352 yards, 1 touchdown, 1 interception
- DAL – Jon Kitna – 30/42, 313 yards, 1 interception

Top rushers

- NO – Julius Jones – 10 rushes, 45 yards
- DAL – Miles Austin – 1 rush, 60-yard, 1 touchdown

Top receivers

- NO – Marques Colston – 6 receptions, 105 yards
- DAL – Jason Witten – 10 receptions, 99 yards

Top tacklers

- NO – Jonathan Vilma – 8 tackles, 3 assists
- DAL – Terence Newman – 8 tackles

The Saints played the Thanksgiving Day game at Cowboys Stadium for an NFC duel against the Cowboys. The Saints commanded the first quarter with RB Chris Ivory getting a 3-yard TD run, followed by kicker Garrett Hartley getting a 50-yard field goal, and then by Ivory making a 6-yard TD run. The lead was narrowed as kicker David Buehler got a 21-yard field goal, but the Saints replied as Hartley nailed a 45-yard field goal. The lead was narrowed again as Buehler hit a 53-yard field goal, followed by Miles Austin getting a 60-yard TD run. The Saints scored with Hartley making a 28-yard field goal, but fell behind with Marion Barber and Tashard Choice getting a 1-yard TD run. The Saints, down 27–23, were well on their way to defeat when John Kitna hit Austin with a long-gainer, but safety Malcolm Jenkins stripped Roy Williams and recovered at the New Orleans 11, enabling the Saints to pull out the win five plays later, with QB Drew Brees completing a 12-yard TD pass to WR Lance Moore, completing an 89-yard drive.

With the win, the Saints improved to 8–3.

=== Week 13: at Cincinnati Bengals ===
Week 13: New Orleans Saints at Cincinnati Bengals – Game summary

| Quarter | 1 | 2 | 3 | 4 | Total |
|---|---|---|---|---|---|
| Saints | 3 | 10 | 7 | 14 | 34 |
| Bengals | 0 | 6 | 6 | 18 | 30 |

at Paul Brown Stadium, Cincinnati, Ohio

- Date: December 5
- Game time: 1:00 pm. EST
- Game weather: 32 °F (0 °C) (Cloudy)
- Game attendance: 59,963
- Referee: Jeff Triplette
- TV announcers (Fox): Ron Pitts, John Lynch and Nischelle Turner (blacked out locally)
- Recap

Game information

First quarter

- NO – Garrett Hartley 48-yard field goal, Saints 3–0, Drive: 8 plays, 65 yards, 4:21.

Second quarter

- CIN – Clint Stitser 29-yard field goal, Tied 3–3, Drive: 13 plays, 42 yards, 7:08.
- NO – Chris Ivory 55-yard run (Garrett Hartley kick), Saints 10–3, Drive: 3 plays, 68 yards, 1:01.
- CIN – Clint Stitser 23-yard field goal, Saints 10–6, Drive: 4 plays, 50 yards, 2:21.
- NO – Garrett Hartley 24-yard field goal, Saints 13–6, Drive: 11 plays, 88 yards, 3:15.

Third quarter

- NO – Chris Ivory 1-yard run (Garrett Hartley kick), Saints 20–6, Drive: 11 plays, 66 yards, 5:54.
- CIN – Terrell Owens 5-yard pass from Carson Palmer (kick failed, wr), Saints 20–12, Drive: 9 plays, 60 yards, 5:12.

Fourth quarter

- CIN – Cedric Benson 1-yard run (Clint Stitser kick), Saints 20–19, Drive: 7 plays, 46 yards, 3:36.
- NO – Robert Meachem 52-yard pass from Drew Brees (Garrett Hartley kick), Saints 27–19, Drive: 3 plays, 69 yards, 1:25.
- CIN – Cedric Benson 4-yard run (Carson Palmer – Jermaine Gresham pass), Tied 27–27, Drive: 8 plays, 59 yards, 4:05.
- CIN – Clint Stitser 47-yard field goal, Bengals 30–27, Drive: 5 plays, 15 yards, 1:38.
- NO – Marques Colston 3-yard pass from Drew Brees (Garret Hartley kick), Saints 34–30, Drive: 7 plays, 68 yards, 3:54.

Top passers

- NO – Drew Brees – 24/29, 313 yards, 2 touchdowns, 1 interception
- CIN – Carson Palmer – 23/33, 249 yards, 1 touchdown

Top rushers

- NO – Chris Ivory – 15 rushes, 117 yards, 2 touchdowns
- CIN – Cedric Benson – 19 rushes, 49 yards, 2 touchdowns

Top receivers

- NO – Robert Meachem – 3 receptions, 106 yards, 1 touchdown
- CIN – Chad Ochocinco – 5 receptions, 96 yards

Top tacklers

- NO – Roman Harper – 5 tackles, 4 assists, 1 sack
- CIN – Johnathan Joseph – 6 tackles

Coming off their win over the Cowboys the Saints played an interconference duel with the Bengals at Paul Brown Stadium. In the first quarter, the Saints took the early lead as kicker Garrett Hartley nailed a 48-yard field goal. The Bengals replied with kicker Clint Stitser hitting a 29-yard field goal, but the Saints scored again with RB Chris Ivory getting a 55-yard TD run, with the Bengals responding as Stitser made a 23-yard field goal. The Saints increased their lead as Hartley made a 24-yard field goal, followed by Ivory getting a 1-yard TD run. The lead was broken down as QB Carson Palmer made a 5-yard TD pass to WR Terrell Owens (With a failed PAT as the kick went wide right), followed by RB Cedric Benson getting a 1-yard TD run. The Saints responded as QB Drew Brees completed a 52-yard TD pass to WR Robert Meachem, but fell behind with Benson getting a 4-yard TD run (With a successful 2-point conversion as Palmer passed to TE Jermaine Gresham), followed by Stitser making a 47-yard field goal. Still, they managed to score to take the win as Brees threw a 3-yard TD pass to WR Marques Colston.

With the win, the Saints improved to 9–3.

=== Week 14: vs. St. Louis Rams ===
Week 14: St. Louis Rams at New Orleans Saints – Game summary

| Quarter | 1 | 2 | 3 | 4 | Total |
|---|---|---|---|---|---|
| Rams | 0 | 6 | 0 | 7 | 13 |
| Saints | 14 | 7 | 7 | 3 | 31 |

at Louisiana Superdome, New Orleans, Louisiana

- Date: December 12
- Game time: 3:05 pm. CST
- Game weather: None (dome stadium)
- Game attendance: 70,015
- Referee: Tony Corrente
- TV announcers (Fox): Dick Stockton, Charles Davis, Jim Mora & Laura Okmin
- Recap

Game information

First quarter

- NO – Marques Colston 5-yard pass from Drew Brees (Garrett Hartley kick), Saints 7–0, Drive: 13 plays, 72 yards, 6:35.
- NO – Marques Colston 17-yard pass from Drew Brees (Garrett Hartley kick), Saints 14–0, Drive: 12 plays, 61 yards, 6:26.

Second quarter

- STL – Josh Brown 38-yard field goal, Saints 14–3, Drive: 9 plays, 61 yards, 4:04.
- STL – Josh Brown 45-yard field goal, Saints 14–6, Drive: 6 plays, 30 yards, 1:06.
- NO – Malcolm Jenkins 96-yard interception return (Garrett Hartley kick), Saints 21–6.

Third quarter

- NO – Lance Moore 31-yard pass from Drew Brees (Garrett Hartley kick), Saints 28–6, Drive: 8 plays, 64 yards, 4:11.

Fourth quarter

- NO – Garrett Hartley 40-yard field goal, Saints 31–6, Drive: 10 plays, 38 yards, 4:07.
- STL – Sam Bradford 1-yard run (Josh Brown kick), Saints 31–13, Drive: 11 plays, 50 yards, 4:21.

Top passers

- STL – Sam Bradford – 18/32, 231 yards, 2 interceptions
- NO – Drew Brees – 25/40, 221 yards, 3 touchdowns, 2 interceptions

Top rushers

- STL – Steven Jackson – 16 rushes, 96 yards
- NO – Chris Ivory – 7 receptions, 47 yards

Top receivers

- STL – Brandon Gibson – 4 receptions, 67 yards
- NO – Lance Moore – 5 receptions, 70 yards, 1 touchdown

Top tacklers

- STL – Craig Dahl – 9 tackles, 1 interception
- NO – Jonathan Vilma – 7 tackles, 1 assist, 1.0 sack, 1 forced fumble

With the win, the Saints improved to 10–3.

=== Week 15: at Baltimore Ravens ===
Week 15: New Orleans Saints at Baltimore Ravens – Game summary

| Quarter | 1 | 2 | 3 | 4 | Total |
|---|---|---|---|---|---|
| Saints | 7 | 7 | 3 | 7 | 24 |
| Ravens | 7 | 14 | 3 | 6 | 30 |

at M&T Bank Stadium, Baltimore, Maryland

- Date: December 19
- Game time: 1:00 pm. EST
- Game weather: 34 °F (1 °C) (Partly Cloudy)
- Game attendance: 71,432
- Referee: Walt Anderson
- TV announcers (Fox): Thom Brennaman, Brian Billick, & Chris Myers
- Recap

Game information

First quarter

- NO – Jimmy Graham 18-yard pass from Drew Brees (Garrett Hartley kick), Saints 7–0, Drive: 7 plays, 60 yards, 3:08.
- BAL – Ed Dickson 34-yard pass from Joe Flacco (Billy Cundiff kick), Tied 7–7, Drive: 9 plays, 76 yards, 4:20.

Second quarter

- BAL – Ray Rice 10-yard run (Billy Cundiff kick), Ravens 14–7, Drive: 9 plays, 58 yards, 4:15.
- BAL – Ray Rice 17-yard pass from Joe Flacco (Billy Cundiff kick), Ravens 21–7, Drive: 5 plays, 34 yards, 3:05.
- NO – Jimmy Graham 1-yard pass from Drew Brees (Garrett Hartley kick), Ravens 21–14, Drive: 9 plays, 92 yards, 2:52.

Third quarter

- NO – Garrett Hartley 47-yard field goal, Ravens 21–17, Drive: 7 plays, 20 yards, 4:08.
- BAL – Billy Cundiff 33-yard field goal, Ravens 24–17, Drive: 9 plays, 59 yards, 4:09.

Fourth quarter

- NO – Lance Moore 15-yard pass from Drew Brees (Garrett Hartley kick), Tied 24–24, Drive: 5 plays, 66 yards, 1:31.
- BAL – Billy Cundiff 32-yard field goal, Ravens 27–24, Drive: 5 plays, 66 yards, 1:31.
- BAL – Billy Cundiff 27-yard field goal, Ravens 30–24, Drive: 4 plays, 9 yards, 1:38.

Top passers

- NO – Drew Brees – 29/46, 3 touchdowns, 1 interception
- BAL – Joe Flacco – 10/20, 172 yards, 2 touchdowns

Top rushers

- NO – Pierre Thomas – 6 rushes, 20 yards
- BAL – Ray Rice – 31 rushes, 153 yards

Top receivers

- NO – Marques Colston – 6 receptions, 80 yards
- BAL – Ray Rice – 5 receptions, 80 yards, 1 touchdown

Top tacklers

- NO – Jonathan Vilma – 8 tackles, 3 assists
- BAL – Jarret Johnson – 6 tackles, 1 assist, 1 sack, 1 forced fumble

With the loss, the Saints fell to 10–4.

=== Week 16: at Atlanta Falcons ===
Week 16: New Orleans Saints at Atlanta Falcons – Game summary

| Quarter | 1 | 2 | 3 | 4 | Total |
|---|---|---|---|---|---|
| Saints | 3 | 7 | 0 | 7 | 17 |
| Falcons | 0 | 7 | 0 | 7 | 14 |

at Georgia Dome, Atlanta, Georgia

- Date: December 27
- Game time: 8:30 pm. EST
- Game weather: None (dome stadium)
- Game attendance: 70,144
- Referee: Ed Hochuli
- TV announcers (ESPN): Mike Tirico, Ron Jaworski, Jon Gruden, Michele Tafoya and Suzy Kolber
- Recap

Game information

First quarter

- NO – Garrett Hartley 52-yard field goal, Saints 3–0, Drive: 8 plays, 37 yards, 4:19.

Second quarter

- NO – Pierre Thomas 2-yard run (Garrett Hartley kick), Saints 10–0, Drive: 5 plays, 34 yards, 2:20.
- ATL – Roddy White 7-yard pass from Matt Ryan (Matt Bryant kick), Saints 10–7, Drive: 8 plays, 78 yards, 3:50.

Third quarter

- No scoring plays

Fourth quarter

- ATL – Chauncey Davis 26-yard interception return (Matt Bryant kick), Falcons 14–10.
- NO – Jimmy Graham 6-yard pass from Drew Brees (Garrett Hartley kick), Saints 17–14, Drive: 13 plays, 90 yards, 7:11.

Top passers

- NO – Drew Brees – 35/49, 302 yards, 1 touchdown, 2 interceptions
- ATL – Matt Ryan – 15/29, 148 yards, 1 touchdown

Top rushers

- NO – Pierre Thomas – 19 rushes, 63 yards, 1 touchdown
- ATL – Michael Turner – 17 rushes, 48 yards

Top receivers

- NO – Robert Meachem – 10 receptions, 101 yards
- ATL – Roddy White – 3 receptions, 43 yards, 1 touchdown

Top tacklers

- NO – Jo-Lonn Dunbar – 5 tackles, 1 assist
- ATL – Curtis Lofton – 6 tackles, 5 assists

Looking to clinch a playoff berth and avenge their Week 3 loss against the Falcons, the Saints traveled to Atlanta for a Monday Night rematch. New Orleans would score first with Garrett Hartley kicking a FG from 52 yards late in the first quarter. RB Pierre Thomas would add to the Saints' lead with a 2-yard TD run; however, Atlanta would respond with a Matt Ryan 7-yard TD pass to Roddy White to cut the lead to three. After a scoreless third quarter, the Falcons took the lead with Chauncey Davis returning an interception 26 yards for a touchdown. New Orleans reclaimed the lead late in the 4th with a Drew Brees 6-yard TD pass to Jimmy Graham. Atlanta attempted to come back; however, New Orleans held on for the win.

With the win, the Saints improved to 11–4 and clinched a playoff berth, becoming the first team in the NFC South to earn consecutive playoff appearances.

=== Week 17: vs. Tampa Bay Buccaneers ===
Week 17: Tampa Bay Buccaneers at New Orleans Saints – Game summary

| Quarter | 1 | 2 | 3 | 4 | Total |
|---|---|---|---|---|---|
| Buccaneers | 3 | 7 | 10 | 3 | 23 |
| Saints | 7 | 0 | 3 | 3 | 13 |

at Louisiana Superdome, New Orleans, Louisiana

- Date: January 2
- Game time: 12:00 pm. CST
- Game weather: None (dome stadium)
- Referee: Gene Steratore
- TV announcers (Fox): Thom Brennaman and Brian Billick

Game information

First quarter Second quarter Third quarter Fourth quarter

Top passers

- TB –
- NO –

Top rushers

- TB –
- NO –

Top receivers

- TB –
- NO –

Top tacklers

- TB –
- NO –

The Saints' sixteenth game was an NFC South rivalry rematch against the Buccaneers inside their dome. In the first quarter the Saints trailed early as kicker Connor Barth hit a 43-yard field goal, but took the lead with QB Drew Brees throwing a 4-yard TD pass to TE Jimmy Graham. The Buccaneers replied with QB Josh Freeman completing a 2-yard TD pass to WR Dezmon Briscoe, but the Saints tied the game with kicker Garrett Hartley nailing a 45-yard field goal. However, they fell behind again with Barth hitting a 32-yard field goal, followed by Freeman making an 18-yard TD pass to WR Mike Williams. The Saints tried to narrow the gap with Hartley making a 38-yard field goal, but the Buccaneers pulled away with Barth nailing a 48-yard field goal.

With the loss, the Saints finish their regular season on an 11–5 record.

== Postseason results ==
| Week | Date | Kickoff | Opponent (seed) | Results | | Game Site | TV | Recap |
| Week | Date | Kickoff | Opponent (seed) | Final score | Team record | Game Site | TV | Recap |
|---|---|---|---|---|---|---|---|---|
| WC | January 8 | 1:30 pm PST | at Seattle Seahawks (4) | L 36–41 | 0–1 | Qwest Field | NBC | Recap |

=== NFC Wild Card playoffs: at Seattle Seahawks ===
New Orleans Saints vs. Seattle Seahawks – Game summary

| Quarter | 1 | 2 | 3 | 4 | Total |
|---|---|---|---|---|---|
| Saints | 10 | 10 | 0 | 16 | 36 |
| Seahawks | 7 | 17 | 10 | 7 | 41 |

at Qwest Field, Seattle, Washington

- Date: January 8
- Game time: 4:30 p.m. EST/1:30 p.m. PST
- Game weather: 40 °F (4 °C) (Cloudy)
- Game attendance: 66,336
- Referee: Walt Coleman
- TV announcers (NBC): Tom Hammond (play-by-play), Mike Mayock (color commentator), and Alex Flanagan (sideline reporter)
- Reference

Game information

First quarter

- NO – Garrett Hartley 26-yard field goal, 11:47. Saints 3–0. Drive: 8 plays, 52 yards, 3:17.
- NO – Heath Evans 1-yard pass from Drew Brees (Garrett Hartley kick), 6:25. Saints 10–0. Drive: 8 plays, 35 yards, 4:11.
- SEA – John Carlson 11-yard pass from Matt Hasselbeck (Olindo Mare kick), 3:43.Saints 10–7. Drive: 6 plays, 57 yards, 2:43.

Second quarter

- NO – Julius Jones 5-yard run (Garrett Hartley kick), 13:42. Saints 17–7. Drive: 10 plays, 83 yards, 5:00.
- SEA – John Carlson 7-yard pass from Matt Hasselbeck (Olindo Mare kick), 11:06. Saints 17–14. Drive: 5 plays, 70 yards, 2:38.
- SEA – Olindo Mare 29-yard field goal, 7:07. Tied 17–17. Drive: 4 plays, 8 yards, 1:47.
- SEA – Brandon Stokley 45-yard pass from Matt Hasselbeck (Olindo Mare kick), 1:23. Seahawks 24–17. Drive: 9 plays, 76 yards, 3:48.
- NO – Garrett Hartley 22-yard field goal, 0:03. Seahawks 24–20. Drive: 11 plays, 77 yards, 1:15.

Third quarter

- SEA – Mike Williams 38-yard pass from Matt Hasselbeck (Olindo Mare kick), 11:55.Seahawks 31–20. Drive: 7 plays, 79 yards, 3:12.
- SEA – Olindo Mare 39 field goal, 5:31. Seahawks 34–20. Drive: 9 plays, 33 yards, 4:12.

Fourth quarter

- NO – Julius Jones 4-yard run (Garrett Hartley kick), 13:16. Seahawks 34–27. Drive: 12 plays, 87 yards, 4:41.
- NO – Garrett Hartley 21-yard field goal, 9:16. Seahawks 34–30. Drive: 8 plays, 53 yards, 3:27.
- SEA – Marshawn Lynch 67-yard run (Olindo Mare kick), 3:38. Seahawks 41–30. Drive: 2 plays, 67 yards, 0:58.
- NO – Devery Henderson 6-yard pass from Drew Brees (run failed), 1:34. Seahawks 41–36. Drive: 9 plays, 70 yards, 1:52.

Top passers

- NO – Drew Brees – 39/60, 404 yards
- SEA – Matt Hasselbeck – 22/35, 272 yards

Top rushers

- NO – Julius Jones – 15 rushes, 59 yards
- SEA – Marshawn Lynch – 19 rushes, 131 yards

Top receivers

- NO – Devery Henderson – 7 rec, 77 yards
- SEA – Brandon Stokley – 4 rec, 73 yards

Entering the postseason as the NFC's #5 seed, the Saints began their playoff run at Qwest Field for the NFC Wild Card Round against the #4 Seattle Seahawks in a rematch of their Week 11 duel. The Seahawks entered the playoffs as the only team to ever make the playoffs with a losing record, theirs being 7–9. New Orleans delivered the game's opening strike in the first quarter with a 26-yard field goal from kicker Garrett Hartley, followed by quarterback Drew Brees finding fullback Heath Evans on a 1-yard touchdown pass. The Seahawks would answer with quarterback Matt Hasselbeck completing an 11-yard touchdown pass to tight end John Carlson. The Saints struck back in the second quarter with a 5-yard touchdown run from running back Julius Jones, but Seattle took the lead with Hasselbeck's 7-yard touchdown pass to Carlson, kicker Olindo Mare making a 29-yard field goal, and Hasselbeck completing a 45-yard touchdown pass to wide receiver Brandon Stokley. New Orleans would close out the half with Hartley's 22-yard field goal.

The Seahawks continued to hack away in the third quarter as Hasselbeck threw a 38-yard touchdown pass to wide receiver Mike Williams, followed by Mare's 39-yard field goal. The Saints tried to rally in the fourth quarter as Jones got a 4-yard touchdown run, followed by Hartley's 21-yard field goal, but Seattle delivered a punishing blow as running back Marshawn Lynch got a 67-yard touchdown run. New Orleans tried to catch up with Brees connecting with wide receiver Devery Henderson (with a failed two-point conversion), but a failed onside kick sealed any hope of a comeback.

With the loss, the Saints, with an overall record of 11–6, were dethroned as Super Bowl champions. This was the sixth consecutive year the defending world champions failed to repeat their title.

== Personnel ==
=== Coaching staff ===
New Orleans Saints 2010 staff
| Front office: Owner/president – Tom Benson; Owner/executive vice president – Rita Benson LeBlanc; Executive vice president/general manager – Mickey Loomis; Director of football administration – Khai Harley; Director of pro scouting – Ryan Pace; Director of college scouting – Rick Reiprish; Assistant director of college scouting – Brian Adams; Head coaches: Head coach – Sean Payton; Assistant head coach/linebackers – Joe Vitt; Offensive coaches: Offensive coordinator – Pete Carmichael Jr.; Quarterbacks – Joe Lombardi; Running backs – Bret Ingalls; Wide receivers – Curtis Johnson; Tight ends – Terry Malone; Offensive line/running game – Aaron Kromer; Offensive assistant – Carter Sheridan; Offensive assistant – Frank Smith | Defensive coaches: Defensive coordinator – Gregg Williams; Defensive line – Bill Johnson; Assistant defensive line – Travis Jones; Secondary – Dennis Allen; Assistant secondary – Tony Oden; Defensive assistant - Marcus Ungaro; Defensive assistant - Blake Williams; Defensive assistant - Brian Young; Special teams coaches: Special teams coordinator – Greg McMahon; Assistant special teams – Mike Mallory; Strength and conditioning: Head strength and conditioning – Dan Dalrymple; Assistant strength and conditioning – Charles Byrd; Strength and conditioning assistant – Robert Wenning |

=== Final roster ===
2010 New Orleans Saints roster
| Quarterbacks (QB): 9 Drew Brees; 10 Chase Daniel; Running backs (RB): 25 Reggie Bush PR; 44 Heath Evans FB; 29 Chris Ivory; 21 Julius Jones; 23 Pierre Thomas; Wide receivers (WR): 87 Adrian Arrington; 12 Marques Colston; 19 Devery Henderson; 17 Robert Meachem; 16 Lance Moore; Tight ends (TE): 80 Jimmy Graham; 84 Tory Humphrey; 88 Jeremy Shockey; 85 David Thomas | Offensive linemen (OL): 71 Charles Brown T; 74 Jermon Bushrod T; 73 Jahri Evans G; 76 Jonathan Goodwin C; 77 Carl Nicks G; 78 Jon Stinchcomb T; 64 Zach Strief T; 65 Matt Tennant C; Defensive linemen (DL): 92 Remi Ayodele DT; 96 Alex Brown DE; 97 Jeff Charleston DE; 98 Sedrick Ellis DT; 93 Junior Galette DE; 69 Anthony Hargrove DE/DT; 91 Will Smith DE; 99 Jimmy Wilkerson DE | Linebackers (LB): 55 Danny Clark OLB; 56 Jo-Lonn Dunbar OLB; 54 Ramon Humber OLB; 94 Kawika Mitchell OLB; 50 Marvin Mitchell MLB; 58 Scott Shanle OLB; 51 Jonathan Vilma MLB; 59 Anthony Waters OLB; Defensive backs (DB): 37 Matt Giordano SS; 33 Jabari Greer CB; 41 Roman Harper SS; 27 Malcolm Jenkins FS/CB; 22 Tracy Porter CB; 31 Pierson Prioleau SS; 34 Patrick Robinson CB; 42 Darren Sharper FS; 24 Leigh Torrence CB; 28 Usama Young FS; Special teams (ST): 47 Justin Drescher LS; 5 Garrett Hartley K; 6 Thomas Morstead P | Practice squad: 70 Roger Allen G; 45 Jed Collins FB; 60 Brian de la Puente C; 75 Mitch King DT; 82 Tyler Lorenzen TE; 38 Mark Parson CB; 14 Andy Tanner WR; 36 Chris Taylor RB; Reserve: 53 Stanley Arnoux OLB (IR); 46 Ladell Betts RB (IR); 52 Jonathan Casillas OLB (IR); 20 Randall Gay CB (IR); 30 Lynell Hamilton RB (IR); 32 P. J. Hill RB (IR); 57 Jason Kyle LS (IR); -- Marcus Mailei FB (IR); 39 Chris Reis SS (IR); 15 Courtney Roby WR (IR); Rookies in italics 53 active, 10 reserve, 8 practice squad |
