= Roman Harper =

American football player (born 1982)

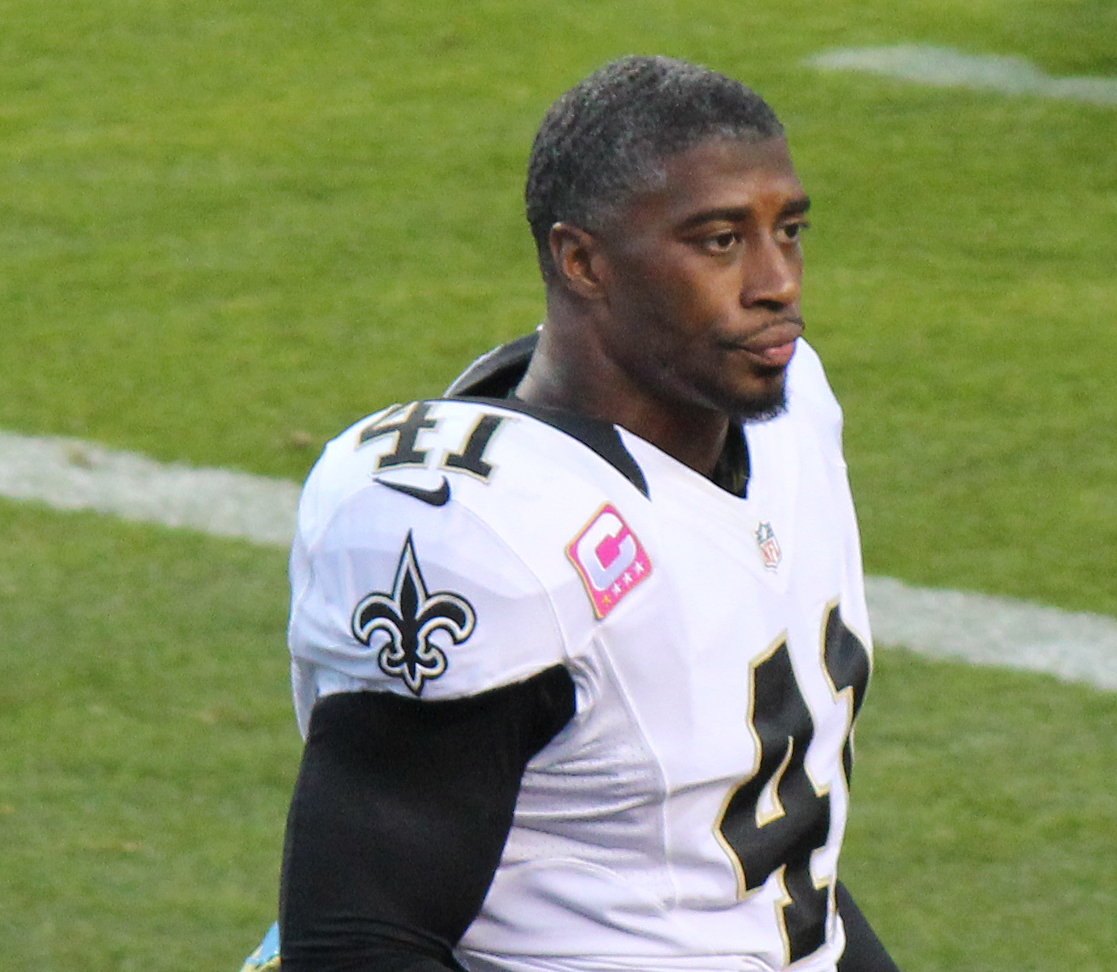
- Harper with the New Orleans Saints in 2012

No. 41
- Position: Safety

Personal information
- Born: December 11, 1982 (age 43); Prattville, Alabama, U.S.
- Listed height: 6 ft 1 in (1.85 m)
- Listed weight: 205 lb (93 kg)

Career information
- High school: Prattville
- College: Alabama (2002–2005)
- NFL draft: 2006: 2nd round, 43rd overall pick

Career history
- New Orleans Saints (2006–2013); Carolina Panthers (2014–2015); New Orleans Saints (2016)

Awards and highlights
- Super Bowl champion (XLIV); 2× Pro Bowl (2009, 2010); New Orleans Saints Hall of Fame; First-team All-SEC (2005); Second-team All-SEC (2004)

Career NFL statistics
- Total tackles: 819
- Sacks: 18
- Forced fumbles: 16
- Fumble recoveries: 5
- Interceptions: 11
- Defensive touchdowns: 2
- Stats at Pro Football Reference

Roman Harper (born December 11, 1982) is an American former professional football player who was a safety in the National Football League (NFL). He played college football for the Alabama Crimson Tide, and was selected by the New Orleans Saints in the second round of the 2006 NFL draft. In 2009, Harper earned his first Pro Bowl invitation and helped lead the Saints to Super Bowl XLIV. The following year, 2010, he was again selected to the Pro Bowl. In 2015, he helped lead the Carolina Panthers to Super Bowl 50.

== Early life ==
Harper went to high school in Prattville, Alabama, where he was an outstanding safety and returner for Prattville High School. He played Quarterback his senior season and led the Lions to a 9–1 regular season finish. Harper was a first Team All State performer and was also selected to the Alabama-Mississippi All-Star Game.

== College career ==
Harper attended the University of Alabama, and played for the Alabama Crimson Tide football team. He was a four-year letterman and a three-year starter at safety and finished his college football career with 302 tackles, 5 interceptions, 5 forced fumbles, 4 fumble recoveries, and 3.5 sacks. As a sophomore, he totaled 114 tackles (second most on the team) and also had an interception and a fumble recovery. As a junior, he was a second team All-Southeastern Conference selection. As a senior, he was a first team All-Southeastern Conference selection.

== Professional career ==
Pre-draft measurables
Height	Weight	Arm length	Hand span	40-yard dash	10-yard split	20-yard split	20-yard shuttle	Three-cone drill	Vertical jump	Broad jump	Bench press
5 ft 11 7/8 in (1.83 m)	198 lb (90 kg)	32 3/4 in (0.83 m)	9 1/4 in (0.23 m)	4.50 s	1.55 s	2.61 s	4.34 s	7.02 s	34 in (0.86 m)	9 ft 8 in (2.95 m)	19 reps
All values from NFL Combine/Alabama's Pro Day

=== New Orleans Saints (first stint) ===
The New Orleans Saints selected Harper in the second round (43rd overall) of the 2006 NFL draft. Harper was the sixth safety drafted in 2006.

On July 27, 2006, the New Orleans Saints signed Harper to a four-year, $3.55 million contract that included a signing bonus of $880,000. Throughout training camp, Harper competed to be the starting strong safety against veteran Omar Stoutmire. Head coach Sean Payton named Harper and Josh Bullocks the starting safety duo to begin the regular season.

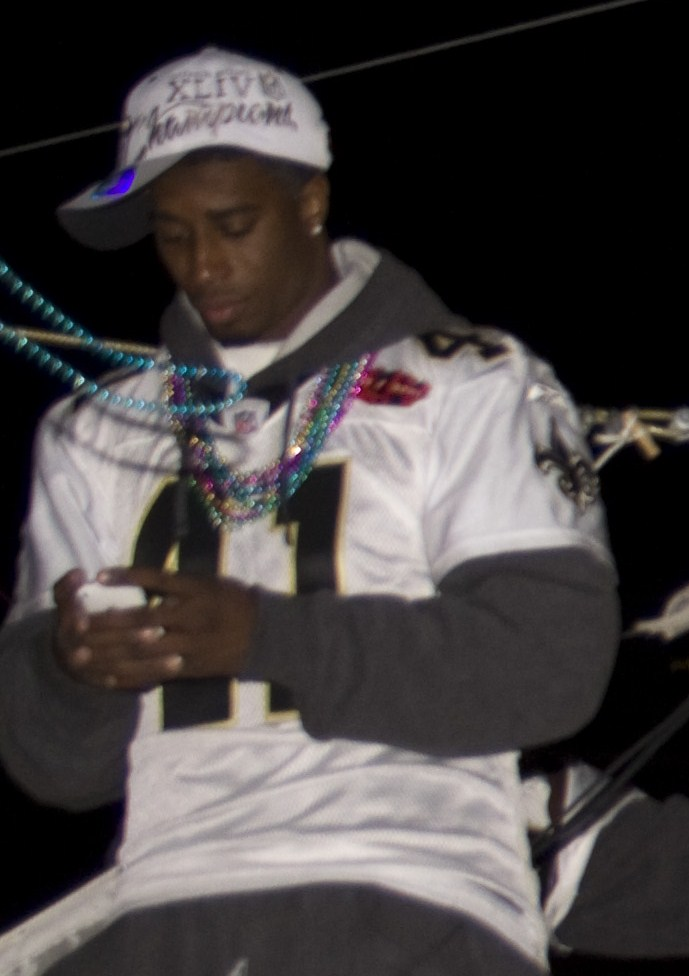
Harper celebrating the Saints' win of Super Bowl XLIV.

Harper started five games in 2006 but was put on injured reserve on October 10. He started 16 games in 2007 and 15 games in 2008. In 2009, Harper earned his first Pro Bowl berth and helped lead the Saints to their first Super Bowl win in franchise history. In Super Bowl XLIV, he led the Saints with 8 tackles and defeated the Indianapolis Colts 31–17.

Harper was released by the Saints on February 12, 2014, after eight years with the team.

=== Carolina Panthers ===
On March 15, 2014, Harper was signed by the Carolina Panthers. During his debut performance for the Panthers against the Tampa Bay Buccaneers, Harper recorded 2 tackles, 1 pass deflection, and 1 interception. During the Panthers week 5 win over the Chicago Bears, Harper recorded his second interception of the season against Jay Cutler. Harper won NFC defensive player of the week for his performance in week 17 against division rival Atlanta Falcons. Harper recorded 6 tackles, 1 pass defended, and a 31-yard pick six. In Harper's second season with the team, The Panthers finished the season with a team record 15 wins. They went on to defeat the Seahawks and Cardinals in their first two playoff games. On February 7, 2016, Harper was part of the Panthers team that played in Super Bowl 50. In the game, he had two tackles, but the Panthers fell to the Denver Broncos by a score of 24–10.

=== New Orleans Saints (second stint) ===
On June 7, 2016, Harper agreed to return to the Saints, where he was expected to play a role in the leadership of the defense while serving as a backup to the Saints' younger safeties. He signed a one-year, $1.065 million contract with the Saints.

=== Awards and championships ===
- 2009 - Super Bowl XLIV Champion
- 2009 - Named to first NFL Pro Bowl
- 2007 - Ed Block Courage Award

=== NFL statistics ===
Year	Team	GP	COMB	TOTAL	AST	SACK	FF	FR	FR YDS	INT	IR YDS	AVG IR	LNG	TD	PD
2006	NO	5	27	25	2	1.0	1	0	0	0	0	0	0	0	3
2007	NO	16	90	75	15	4.0	2	0	0	3	58	19	31	1	8
2008	NO	15	89	82	7	0.0	1	0	0	0	0	0	0	0	9
2009	NO	16	102	84	18	1.5	2	0	0	0	0	0	0	0	5
2010	NO	15	98	76	22	3.0	6	1	0	1	6	6	6	0	8
2011	NO	16	95	73	22	7.5	2	1	0	0	0	0	0	0	7
2012	NO	16	115	88	27	0.0	0	0	0	2	41	21	41	0	11
2013	NO	9	39	27	12	0.0	0	1	19	1	0	0	0	0	1
2014	CAR	16	62	39	23	1.0	1	0	0	4	43	11	31	1	10
2015	CAR	16	73	46	27	0.0	0	2	1	0	0	0	0	0	5
2016	NO	16	29	25	4	0.0	0	0	0	0	0	0	0	0	0
Career		156	818	639	179	18.0	15	5	0	11	148	13	41	2	67

== Community work ==
Harper and his mother, Princess Harper, founded the Harper's Hope Foundation in 2009. The primary goal of the foundation has been, “to strengthen families and enhance their emotional, social, and spiritual health through educational programs, enrichment activities, and economic development.”

In July 2010, the foundation hosted its first annual "A Sainted Weekend" Celebrity Golf Tournament and Silent Auction.

Harper became a member of School of the Legends (SOTL) in 2010.
