= Usama Young =

American football player (born 1985)

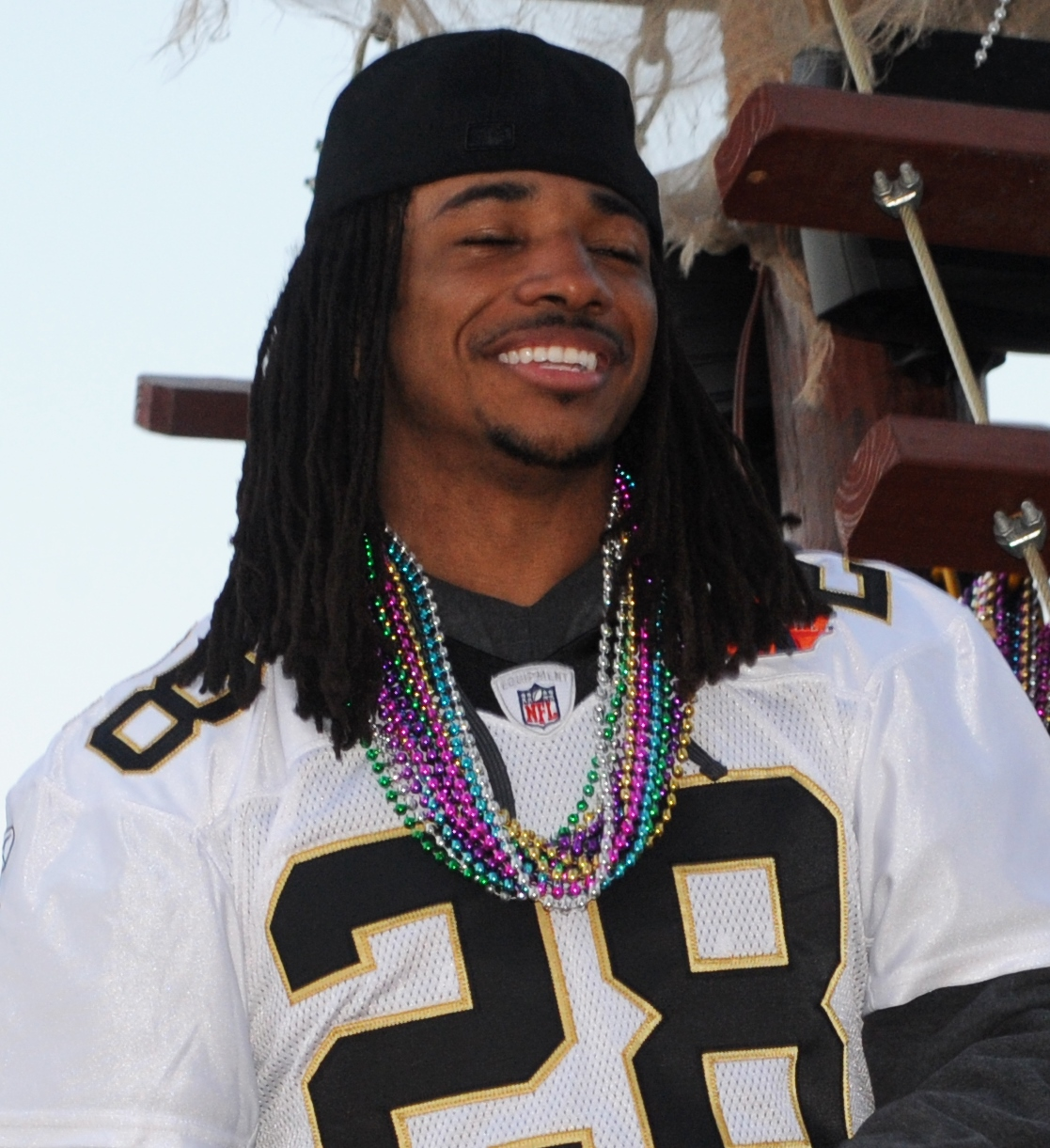
- Young at the Saints Super Bowl XLIV parade in 2010

No. 38, 28, 26
- Position: Safety

Personal information
- Born: May 8, 1985 (age 41); Washington, D.C., U.S.
- Listed height: 5 ft 11 in (1.80 m)
- Listed weight: 195 lb (88 kg)

Career information
- High school: Largo (MD)
- College: Kent State
- NFL draft: 2007: 3rd round, 66th overall pick

Career history
- New Orleans Saints (2007–2010); Cleveland Browns (2011–2012); Oakland Raiders (2013–2014)

Awards and highlights
- Super Bowl champion (XLIV)

Career NFL statistics
- Total tackles: 278
- Sacks: 6
- Fumble recoveries: 4
- Pass deflections: 27
- Interceptions: 8
- Stats at Pro Football Reference

Usama Young (born May 8, 1985) is an American former professional football player who was a safety in the National Football League (NFL). He played college football at Kent State University. He was selected by the New Orleans Saints in the third round of the 2007 NFL draft. He also played for the Cleveland Browns.

== Early life ==
Usama was born in the North East section of Washington D.C. to Dr. Khaula Murtadha and Leroi A. Young (1950–2016). Usama is the youngest son of their four boys. Usama Young attended Largo High School in Largo, Maryland and was a letterman in football, baseball, and track. He started to play football at the age of 8. As the youngest, Usama was given the opportunity to learn from his older brothers who pushed him to never cry, complain or make excuses. When Usama was 12 he was playing football in a local pee-wee football game. During the middle of the game a rabid dog ran onto the field and terrorized the young players, coaches and family members who were on the sidelines watching. To everyone's surprise the twelve-year-old Usama was able to tackle the dog, tie the dog up using the chains from the down markers and successfully restore order to the pee-wee football game.

By the time Usama was a freshman in high school he developed a work ethic that would stay with him throughout his football career. As a senior in high school, he was a second team All-State honoree. Young graduated from Largo High School in 2003. He worked as a vendor at FedExField during home games of the Washington Redskins while in high school. This was revealed during the SuperAd that he and his father were featured in during Super Bowl XLIII.

== College career ==
Young was regarded as one of the top defensive prospects to emerge from Kent State in the last three decades. A three-year starter, his collegiate career totals include starting 37 of 45 games, with 198 tackles (129 solo), three forced fumbles, two fumble recoveries, nine interceptions with 21 yards in returns, 21 pass defenses and a blocked kick.

As a freshman in 2003, Young started 9 of 12 games and had 49 tackles, two interceptions, 8 pass defenses and 2 fumble recoveries. In 2004, Young started 10 games and missed one game due to a hip strain. In those games, Young had 39 tackles and 3 interceptions with 57 return yards. In 2005, his junior year, Young started seven games and had 50 tackles with 4 for losses, 2 interceptions, and 3 passes deflected. A second-team All-Mid-American Conference selection as a senior, Young made a career-high 60 tackles (39 solo) in 2006 as well as 2 interceptions, 3 forced fumbles, 6 pass defenses, and one blocked punt.

== Professional career ==
Pre-draft measurables
Height	Weight	Arm length	Hand span	40-yard dash	10-yard split	20-yard split	20-yard shuttle	Three-cone drill	Vertical jump	Broad jump	Bench press
5 ft 11 1/8 in (1.81 m)	186 lb (84 kg)	30 1/4 in (0.77 m)	9 3/8 in (0.24 m)	4.39 s	1.46 s	2.51 s	4.31 s	6.65 s	43 in (1.09 m)	10 ft 11 in (3.33 m)	14 reps
Values all from Pro Day; see also scouting report at the Wayback Machine (archived May 1, 2007)

=== New Orleans Saints ===
Selected in the third round as the 66th overall pick in the 2007 NFL draft, Young signed with the New Orleans Saints on June 11, 2007, with a three-year contract. As a rookie in 2007, Young played 14 games and made 25 tackles and deflected one pass. In 2008, Young started 2 of 15 games played and made 50 tackles, 8 passes deflected, and 2 interceptions. Young won the Super Bowl XLIV title with the Saints after the 2009 season, in which Young played 12 games with 1 start and had 8 tackles, 1 pass deflected, and 1 interception returned 24 yards. In his final season with the Saints in 2010, Young made 23 tackles and 3 passes deflected.

=== Cleveland Browns ===
On July 28, 2011, Young signed as a free agent with the Cleveland Browns. In the 2011 season, Young played all 16 games for the first time in his career and started 8 games. Young made 70 tackles, 1 pass deflected, and 1 interception returned for 28 yards. The following season in 2012, Young played 13 games and started 11 and made 53 tackles, 7 passes deflected, and 3 interceptions returned for 44 yards. The Browns cut Young on April 2, 2013.

=== Oakland Raiders ===
Young signed with the Oakland Raiders on April 9, 2013.

== Executive career ==
=== National Football League ===
In November 2017, Young was hired to help player engagement in the NFL. Usama played a crucial role in supporting players and their families in thr NFL.

=== New York Giants ===
On May 6, 2025, Young was hired to be the Vice President of Player Engagement for the New York Giants under general manager Joe Schoen.

In February 2026, Young was let go apart of the regime change with John Harbaugh.

== NFL career statistics ==
Year	Team	Games		Tackles				Interceptions				Fumbles			
Year	Team	GP	GS	Comb	Solo	Ast	Sack	PD	Int	Yards	TD	FF	FR	Yards	TD
2007	NOR	14	0	25	23	2	0.0	2	0	0	0	0	0	0	0
2008	NOR	15	2	50	42	8	0.0	8	2	3	0	0	1	7	0
2009	NOR	12	1	8	6	2	0.0	1	1	24	0	0	1	0	0
2010	NOR	11	3	23	21	2	1.0	3	0	0	0	0	0	0	0
2011	CLE	16	8	70	51	19	0.0	1	1	28	0	0	0	0	0
2012	CLE	13	11	53	37	16	1.5	7	3	44	0	0	1	2	0
2013	OAK	12	1	26	20	6	2.5	3	1	26	0	0	1	0	0
2014	OAK	6	3	23	21	2	1.0	2	0	0	0	0	0	0	0
Career		99	29	278	221	57	6.0	27	8	125	0	0	4	9	0
