= 2010 All-Pro Team =

Official list of the best NFL players in 2010

The 2010 All-Pro teams were named by the Associated Press (AP), Pro Football Writers of America (PFWA), and The Sporting News (TSN) for performance in the 2010 NFL season. While none of these have the official imprimatur of the NFL (whose official recognition is nomination to the 2011 Pro Bowl), they are included (separately) in the NFL Record and Fact Book. Any player selected to any of the teams can be described as an "All-Pro."

The AP team, with first- and second-team selections, was chosen by a national panel of 50 NFL writers; the Sporting News selection process uses a panel of 50 NFL coaches and executives, while the PFWA team is chosen by polling its 300+ members.

== Teams ==
Offense
Position	First team	Second team
Quarterback	Tom Brady, New England Patriots (AP, SN, PFWA)	
Running back	Jamaal Charles, Kansas City Chiefs (AP, PFWA); Arian Foster, Houston Texans (AP, PFWA, SN); Maurice Jones-Drew, Jacksonville Jaguars (SN)	Michael Turner, Atlanta Falcons (AP-2); Adrian Peterson, Minnesota Vikings (AP-2)
Fullback^{[b]}	Vonta Leach, Houston Texans (AP)	Ovie Mughelli, Atlanta Falcons (AP-2)
Wide receiver	Roddy White, Atlanta Falcons (AP, SN, PFWA); Reggie Wayne, Indianapolis Colts (AP, PFWA); Andre Johnson, Houston Texans (SN)	Brandon Lloyd, Denver Broncos (AP-2); Calvin Johnson, Detroit Lions (AP-2t); Dwayne Bowe, Kansas City Chiefs (AP-2t)
Tight end	Jason Witten, Dallas Cowboys (AP, SN, PFWA)	Antonio Gates, San Diego Chargers (AP-2)
Tackle	Jake Long, Miami Dolphins (AP, SN, PFWA); Joe Thomas, Cleveland Browns (AP, SN, PFWA)	Sebastian Vollmer, New England Patriots (AP-2); Jason Peters, Philadelphia Eagles (AP-2)
Guard	Logan Mankins, New England Patriots (AP); Jahri Evans, New Orleans Saints (AP, SN, PFWA); Chris Snee, New York Giants (SN, PFWA)	Carl Nicks, New Orleans Saints (AP-2); Chris Snee, New York Giants (AP-2)
Center	Nick Mangold, New York Jets (AP, SN, PFWA)	Maurkice Pouncey, Pittsburgh Steelers (AP-2)

Special teams
Position	First team	Second team
Kicker	Billy Cundiff, Baltimore Ravens (AP, PFWA); David Akers, Philadelphia Eagles (SN)	David Akers, Philadelphia Eagles (AP-2)
Punter	Shane Lechler, Oakland Raiders (AP, SN, PFWA)	Mat McBriar, Dallas Cowboys (AP-2)
Kick returner	Devin Hester, Chicago Bears (AP); Leon Washington, Seattle Seahawks (SN, PFWA)	Leon Washington, Seattle Seahawks (AP-2)
Punt returner^{[d]}	Devin Hester, Chicago Bears (SN, PFWA)	
Special teams^{[e]}	Eric Weems, Atlanta Falcons (PFWA)	

Defense
Position	First team	Second team
Defensive end	Julius Peppers, Chicago Bears (AP, SN, PFWA); John Abraham, Atlanta Falcons (AP, SN); Justin Tuck, New York Giants (PFWA)	Osi Umenyiora, New York Giants (AP-2); Justin Tuck, New York Giants (AP-2)
Defensive tackle	Ndamukong Suh, Detroit Lions (AP, SN, PFWA); Haloti Ngata, Baltimore Ravens (AP, SN, PFWA)	Kyle Williams, Buffalo Bills (AP-2); Vince Wilfork, New England Patriots (AP-2)
Outside linebacker^{[c]}	James Harrison, Pittsburgh Steelers (AP, SN, PFWA); Clay Matthews III, Green Bay Packers (AP, SN, PFWA); Cameron Wake, Miami Dolphins (SN)	DeMarcus Ware, Dallas Cowboys (AP-2); Cameron Wake, Miami Dolphins (AP-2)
Inside linebacker^{[c]}	Patrick Willis, San Francisco 49ers (AP); Jerod Mayo, New England Patriots (AP, PFWA)	Ray Lewis, Baltimore Ravens (AP-2); Brian Urlacher, Chicago Bears (AP-2)
Cornerback	Nnamdi Asomugha, Oakland Raiders (AP); Darrelle Revis, New York Jets (AP, PFWA); Asante Samuel, Philadelphia Eagles (SN, PFWA); Devin McCourty, New England Patriots (SN)	Devin McCourty, New England Patriots (AP-2); Charles Woodson, Green Bay Packers (AP-2)
Safety	Ed Reed, Baltimore Ravens (AP, SN, PFWA); Troy Polamalu, Pittsburgh Steelers (AP, SN, PFWA)	Darren Sharper, New Orleans Saints (AP-2); Michael Griffin, Tennessee Titans (AP-2t); Michael Huff, Oakland Raiders (AP-2t); Chris Harris, Chicago Bears (AP-2t); Quintin Mikell, Philadelphia Eagles (AP-2t); Malcolm Jenkins, New Orleans Saints (AP-2t); Eric Weddle, San Diego Chargers (AP-2t); Antrel Rolle, New York Giants (AP-2t); Nick Collins, Green Bay Packers (AP-2t)

^{a} Each AP voter is given one vote per slot (e.g., voters vote for one QB, two WRs, etc.). The Second Team consists of the runners-up at each position (e.g., the second-highest vote getter at QB, the third- and fourth-highest at RB, etc.). Tom Brady was a unanimous selection for All-Pro QB, so there is no Second Team QB.
^{b} Only the AP designates fullbacks.
^{c} The Sporting News groups all linebackers together and names three total, the PFWA names two outside and one inside (middle) linebacker (as in a 4-3 defense), while the AP designates two outside and two inside linebackers.
^{d} The AP does not designate a punt returner.
^{e} Only PFWA designates a special teams player.

== Key ==
- AP = Associated Press first-team All-Pro
- AP-2 = Associated Press second-team All-Pro
- AP-2t = Tied for second-team All-Pro in the AP vote
- PFWA = Pro Football Writers Association All-NFL
- SN = Sporting News All-Pro
