= Curtis Lofton =

American football player (born 1986)

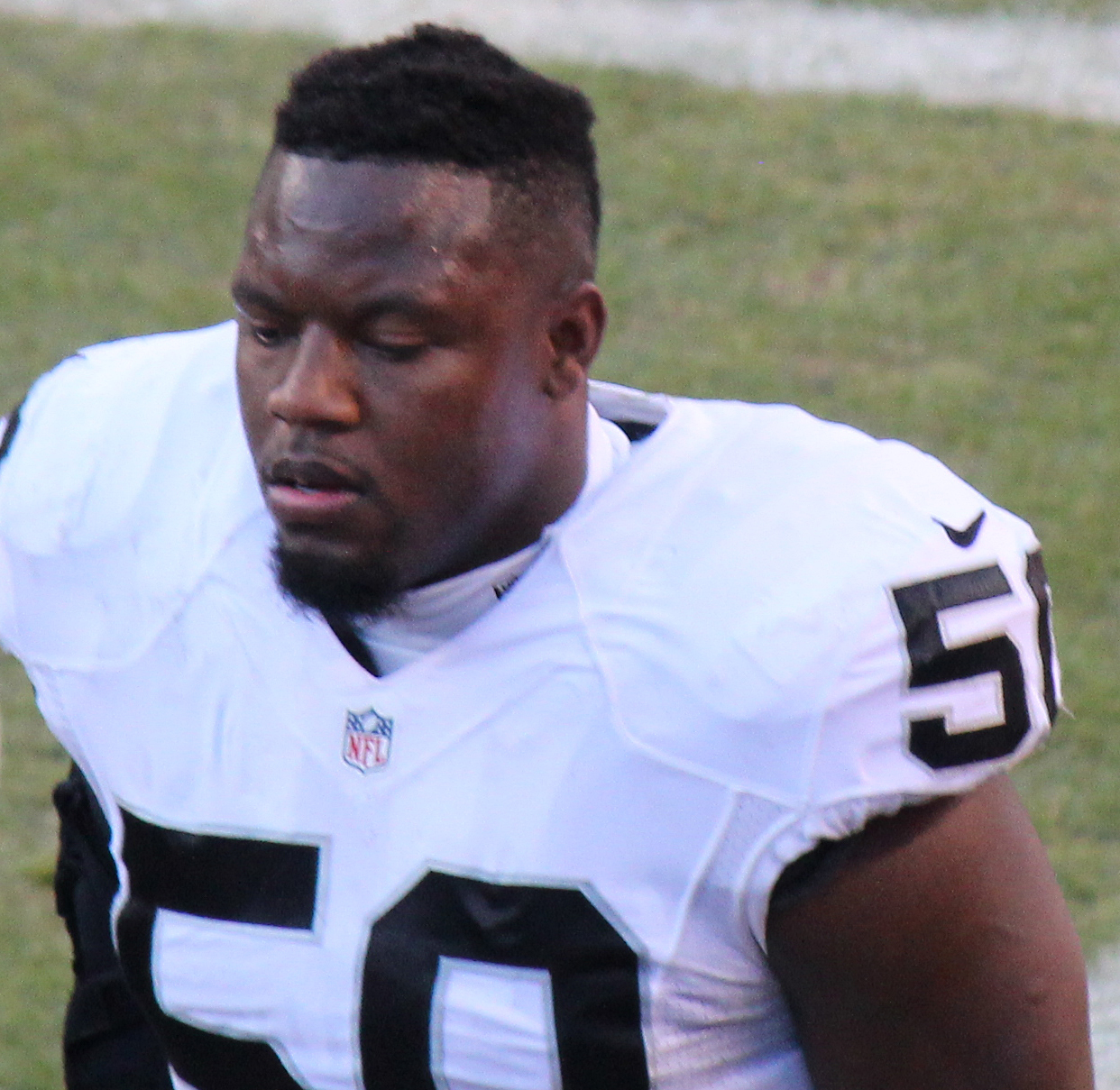
- Lofton with the Oakland Raiders in 2015

No. 50
- Position: Linebacker

Personal information
- Born: June 2, 1986 (age 40); Kingfisher, Oklahoma, U.S.
- Listed height: 6 ft 2 in (1.88 m)
- Listed weight: 238 lb (108 kg)

Career information
- High school: Kingfisher
- College: Oklahoma
- NFL draft: 2008: 2nd round, 37th overall pick

Career history

Playing
- Atlanta Falcons (2008–2011); New Orleans Saints (2012–2014); Oakland Raiders (2015)

Operations
- Oklahoma (2022–2023) Director of the S.O.U.L. Mission; Oklahoma (2024) General manager

Awards and highlights
- PFW Defensive Rookie of the Year (2008); PFWA All-Rookie Team (2008); Consensus All-American (2007); Big 12 Defensive Player of the Year (2007); First-team All-Big 12 (2007)

Career NFL statistics
- Total tackles: 948
- Sacks: 8.0
- Forced fumbles: 11
- Fumble recoveries: 5
- Interceptions: 3
- Defensive touchdowns: 1
- Stats at Pro Football Reference

Curtis Tremayne Lofton (born June 2, 1986) is an American former professional football player who was a linebacker in the National Football League (NFL). He played college football for the Oklahoma Sooners, earning All-American honors. Lofton was selected by the Atlanta Falcons in the second round of the 2008 NFL draft. He also played for the New Orleans Saints and Oakland Raiders.

== Early life ==
Lofton was born in Kingfisher, Oklahoma. He attended Kingfisher High School, where he was a standout player for the Kingfisher Yellowjackets high school football team. A three-year letterman and starter, he also played fullback. He led his team in tackles with 168 during his senior year and 505 over his career, helping lead his team to the 3A state championship in 2003 and helping them advance to the semifinals in 2004. Curtis was coached during high school, including his junior year where he led Kingfisher to its first state championship, by Rick Vancleave, Stan Blundell, Mark Redwine, Larry Hart, and Doug Jech. He rushed for 12 touchdowns as a senior. Lofton was a Parade first-team All-American (2004), The Oklahoman All-State (2004), first-team coaches All-state 2004 and also nominated for the March of Dimes Oklahoma Headliners Banquet as one of the top scholar-athletes in the state of Oklahoma.

Lofton also competed on the track & field team, where he was a 100-meter dash state runner up, running a personal-best of 10.73 seconds, and was also a starter on the basketball team.

=== Recruiting ===
Lofton was ranked as the No. 8 inside linebacker in the nation (ESPN.com), No. 2 in the Midlands (SuperPrep and Scout.com), No. 9 linebacker in the nation (Scout.com), No. 2 player in Oklahoma (Scout.com), No. 4 inside LB in the nation (Rivals.com) and No. 62 player in the nation (Rivals.com). He went to Oklahoma to play college football with the Sooners.

== College career ==
Lofton attended the University of Oklahoma, where he played for coach Bob Stoops's Oklahoma Sooners football team from 2005 to 2007.

=== 2005 ===
Lofton saw spot duty at middle linebacker, but got most of his action on the Sooners' special teams.

=== 2006 ===
Lofton totaled five tackles and one tackle for loss in the 2006 Big 12 Championship Game against Nebraska . He closed out the year with four solo tackles and a 14-yard kickoff return against Boise State in the 2007 Fiesta Bowl he also recovered a fumble and was ranked second on the team in special teams tackles with 10. He finished the season with 14 games played and recorded 37 tackles (20 solo), 4.5 tackles for loss, one fumble recovery and one forced fumble.

=== 2007 ===
Lofton earned first-team All-American honors from The NFL Draft Report, Football Writers Association of America, Sports Illustrated and The Sporting News adding second-team accolades from the Associated Press. He totaled 157 tackles, which ranked third in the nation, three interceptions, 10 tackles for loss and one sack while compiling eight games of at least 10 tackles, and added first-team All-Big 12 Conference recognition from the league coaches and was selected as the Associated Press Big 12 Defensive Player of the Year. His 11.2 tackles per game ranked seventh nationally and second in the conference.

Was named Big 12 Defensive Player of the Week by his performance against Utah State after recording 12 tackles and one interception which was returned 45 yards for a touchdown and also credited for 16 tackles and one pass defensed at Colorado . In the 2007 Big 12 Championship Game, Lofton picked off a Chase Daniel pass and returned it 26 yards to the Tiger 7-yard line. The Sooner offense cashed in the takeaway with a touchdown to expand OU lead to 28-14. The play tipped the momentum and Oklahoma cruised in with a 38-17 triumph.

Lofton announced on January 14, 2008 that he would forgo his senior season and enter the 2008 NFL draft.

== Professional career ==
Pre-draft measurables
| Height | Weight | 40-yard dash | 10-yard split | 20-yard split | 20-yard shuttle | Three-cone drill | Vertical jump | Broad jump | Bench press |
|---|---|---|---|---|---|---|---|---|---|
| 6 ft 0 in (1.83 m) | 246 lb (112 kg) | 4.67 s | 1.55 s | 2.65 s | 4.54 s | 7.52 s | 32 in (0.81 m) | 9 ft 4 in (2.84 m) | 23 reps |
All values from NFL Combine and Pro Day

=== Atlanta Falcons ===
The Atlanta Falcons selected Lofton in the second round (37th overall) of the 2008 NFL draft. Lofton was the third linebacker drafted in 2008.

Lofton became a starter in his rookie 2008 season and ranked fourth on the team with 94 tackles (67 solo). Since 2010, Curtis Lofton led the team in tackles and had been an integral part of the defense.

=== New Orleans Saints ===
Lofton signed with the New Orleans Saints on March 24, 2012 with a 5-year deal, worth up to $27.5 million. Lofton led the Saints in tackles in the 2012 season (123) and also recorded one sack, two forced fumbles, and two fumble recoveries. He was expected to start at one of the ILB spots in the Saints 3-4 defense in the 2013 season. Lofton was released by the Saints on March 9, 2015.

=== Oakland Raiders ===
Lofton signed with the Oakland Raiders on March 11, 2015.

The Raiders released him on March 11, 2016.

== Post-playing career ==
On September 12, 2017, Lofton officially announced his retirement from the NFL on hobhsports.com.

In 2022, Oklahoma football coach Brent Venables selected Lofton, Josh Norman, Caleb Kelly, and Ryan Young to lead the team's player development program, the S.O.U.L. (Serving Our Uncommon Legacy) Mission. In 2024, Lofton was named general manager of the Sooners football team, but resigned after only seven months to pursue ministry.

=== NFL statistics ===
| Year | Team | GP | COMB | SOLO | AST | SACK | FF | FR | FR YDS | INT | IR YDS | AVG IR | LNG | TD | PD |
|---|---|---|---|---|---|---|---|---|---|---|---|---|---|---|---|
| 2008 | ATL | 16 | 94 | 67 | 27 | 1.0 | 1 | 0 | 0 | 0 | 0 | 0 | 0 | 0 | 3 |
| 2009 | ATL | 16 | 133 | 105 | 28 | 0.0 | 2 | 0 | 0 | 0 | 0 | 0 | 0 | 0 | 2 |
| 2010 | ATL | 16 | 118 | 93 | 25 | 2.0 | 3 | 0 | 0 | 1 | 2 | 2 | 2 | 0 | 3 |
| 2011 | ATL | 16 | 147 | 87 | 60 | 1.0 | 1 | 1 | 0 | 2 | 30 | 15 | 26 | 1 | 7 |
| 2012 | NO | 16 | 123 | 82 | 41 | 1.0 | 2 | 2 | 0 | 0 | 0 | 0 | 0 | 0 | 7 |
| 2013 | NO | 16 | 125 | 82 | 43 | 2.0 | 1 | 0 | 0 | 0 | 0 | 0 | 0 | 0 | 4 |
| 2014 | NO | 16 | 145 | 100 | 45 | 0.0 | 1 | 1 | 0 | 0 | 0 | 0 | 0 | 0 | 1 |
| 2015 | OAK | 16 | 64 | 45 | 19 | 1.0 | 0 | 1 | 0 | 0 | 0 | 0 | 0 | 0 | 0 |
| Career | | 128 | 949 | 661 | 288 | 8.0 | 11 | 5 | 0 | 3 | 32 | 11 | 26 | 1 | 27 |
