= Eric Weems =

American football player (born 1985)

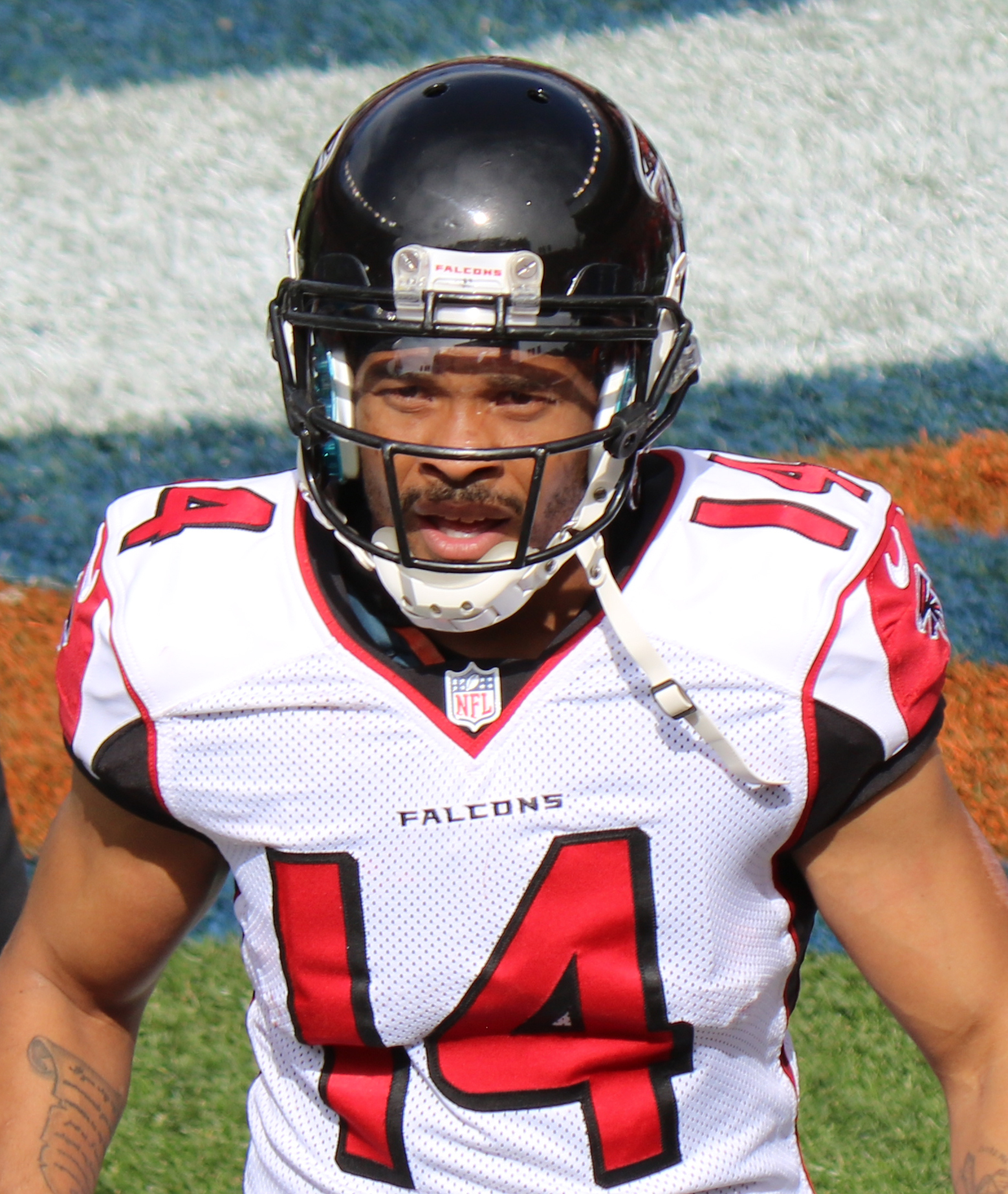
- Weems with the Falcons in 2016

No. 14
- Positions: Wide receiver, return specialist

Personal information
- Born: July 4, 1985 (age 41); Daytona Beach, Florida, U.S.
- Listed height: 5 ft 9 in (1.75 m)
- Listed weight: 195 lb (88 kg)

Career information
- High school: Seabreeze (Daytona Beach)
- College: Bethune–Cookman (2003–2006)
- NFL draft: 2007: undrafted

Career history
- Atlanta Falcons (2007–2011); Chicago Bears (2012–2013); Atlanta Falcons (2014–2016); Tennessee Titans (2017)

Awards and highlights
- First-team All-Pro (2010); Pro Bowl (2010)

Career NFL statistics
- Receptions: 39
- Receiving yards: 358
- Rushing yards: 57
- Return yards: 5,354
- Total touchdowns: 6
- Stats at Pro Football Reference

Eric G. Weems (born July 4, 1985) is an American former professional football player who was a wide receiver, special teamer, and return specialist in the National Football League (NFL). He played college football for the Bethune–Cookman Wildcats and was signed by the Atlanta Falcons as an undrafted free agent in 2007. He also played for the Chicago Bears and Tennessee Titans.

== Early life ==
Weems attended Seabreeze High School in Daytona Beach, Florida and was a letterman in football and basketball. In football, as a senior, he was named the team M.V.P. and was an All-Area selection and an All-State selection. In basketball, he was an All-Area selection.

== College career ==
While attending Bethune-Cookman University in his hometown of Daytona Beach, Florida, Weems was a stand-out wide receiver/A-back for the Bethune–Cookman Wildcats football team. He played under head coach Alvin Wyatt from 2003 to 2007. Weems left with his name in the records for numerous receiving categories throughout his four-year career at Bethune-Cookman. In his senior year, he added special teams to his portfolio, serving as the kickoff and punt return specialist for the Wildcats.

== Professional career ==
=== Atlanta Falcons (first stint) ===
==== 2007 season ====
Weems saw action in the NFL for the first time in the season finale against the Seattle Seahawks. He did not post any statistics.

==== 2008 season ====
Weems's first career reception came with a 4-yard catch in the first quarter of the Falcons' week 12 match-up against the Carolina Panthers. Later in the same game, Weems provided a key block for a 7-yard Harry Douglas touchdown run. His first career fumble recovery came on a Minnesota Vikings muffed punt in week 16 of the 2008 season.

==== 2009 season ====
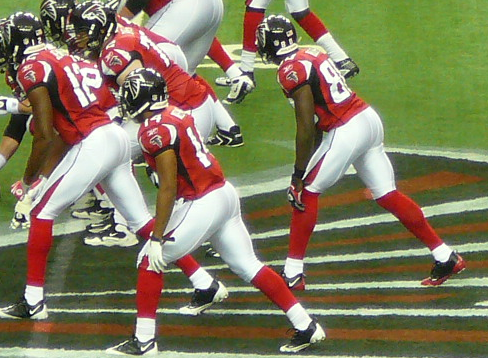
Eric Weems with Sam Baker, Michael Jenkins and Marty Booker.

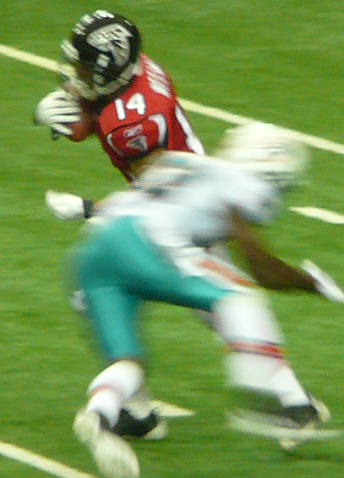
Eric Weems playing against the Miami Dolphins in 2009.

Weems won a job with the Atlanta Falcons as a punt returner in 2009 when wide receiver Harry Douglas was placed on the injured reserved list with a season ending knee injury. Weems ended up returning both punts and kicks as the season progressed. Weems scored his first career touchdown against the Dallas Cowboys in Week 7 of the 2009 season, he caught a 30-yard touchdown pass from quarterback Matt Ryan. Weems scored his second career touchdown against the New York Giants in Week 11 of the 2009 season, he had a 4-yard touchdown reception.

On the night of November 16, 2009, Weems was arrested in DeKalb County, Georgia for suspicion of driving under the influence of alcohol. Shortly afterward, Weems released a statement saying “Unfortunately, I was involved in an incident on November 17, 2009. I am embarrassed about the situation and I sincerely apologize to the entire Atlanta Falcons organization and our great fans.” No specific action was taken by the Atlanta Falcons or the NFL.

Weems finished the 2009 season with six catches for 50 yards and two touchdowns. He rushed eight times for 53 yards. Weems returned 48 kicks for 1214 yards and 27 punts for 270 yards, fumbled three times and losing two, and recorded 10 tackles.

==== 2010 season ====
Weems had a career-high of four catches against the Pittsburgh Steelers in the first week of the 2010 season. He had his first career start as a wide receiver against the Arizona Cardinals in week 2. Weems returned his first career kickoff return for a touchdown against the Tampa Bay Buccaneers on week 13 of the season. The 102 yards was a franchise record for the Atlanta Falcons. He also returned his first career punt return for a touchdown against the Carolina Panthers on week 17 of the season. The 55 yards was a career-high. Weems was selected to the 2011 Pro Bowl as a special teams member. Weems finished the 2010 season with six catches for 61 yards. He returned 40 kickoffs for a 1,100 yards with one touchdown. Weems returned 18 punts for 230 yards with one touchdown. He was the only player in the NFC to return a kick and a punt for a touchdown. Weems had a notable contribution for the Atlanta Falcons in the 2010-2011 NFC Divisional Round against the Green Bay Packers. Early in the second quarter, Weems fielded a kickoff two yards deep in his team's own end zone and ran virtually untouched for 102-yard kickoff return touchdown. The 102-yard return was the longest play in NFL postseason history.

==== 2011 season ====
The Atlanta Falcons re-signed Weems to a one-year contract on July 31, 2011. He appeared in all 16 games with the Atlanta Falcons, He made two starts at the wide receiver position. Weems caught a career-high 11 catches for a career-high 90 yards. Weems returned 24 kicks for 563 yards. He also returned 32 punts for 315 Yards. Weems also recorded 12 tackles on special teams. He did not score any touchdowns.

Weems was selected as a first-team alternate for the 2012 Pro Bowl as a special teams player.

Weems returned four kickoffs for an average of 20 yards per kickoff and a long of 27 yards in the NFC Wild Card Round game against the New York Giants. He did not record any receptions in the 24–2 loss.

=== Chicago Bears ===
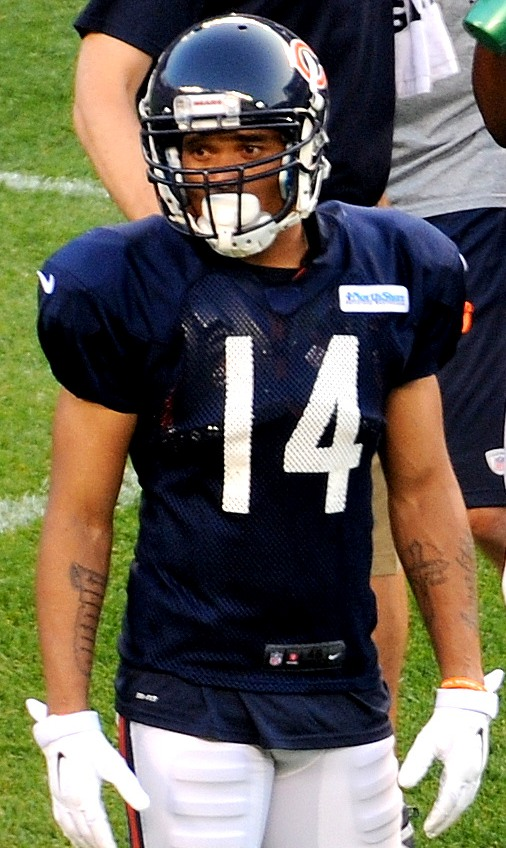
Weems at Bears training camp in 2014

On March 14, 2012, Weems signed a three-year contract with the Chicago Bears as an unrestricted free agent. Weems played in all 16 games with one start at the wide receiver position. Weems caught 2 balls for only 27 yards. He returned 13 kickoffs for 231 yards and 1 punt for no yards. Weems fumbled once and recovered 2 fumbles during the season. He also made 8 tackles. The Bears finished the season with a record of 10-6 and did not make the playoffs.

Weems appeared in all 16 games with the Bears in 2013. He recorded only one reception for eight yards. Weems returned five kickoffs for 57 yards. Weems recorded nine tackles in the season and forced one fumble.

After the Bears signed Santonio Holmes, Weems was released by the team on August 16, 2014.

=== Atlanta Falcons (second stint) ===
On August 21, 2014, Weems signed with the Atlanta Falcons. Weems appeared in all 16 regular season games with the Atlanta Falcons in 2014. On October 5, Weems forced a fumble and recovered a fumble on separate occasions against the New York Giants. He caught his first touchdown of the season against the Green Bay Packers on December 8. He then caught his second touchdown two weeks later on December 21, against the New Orleans Saints. Weems caught 10 passes for a career-high 102 yards and two touchdowns. On special teams, he recorded thirteen tackles, two fumble recoveries, a forced fumble, and returned two kicks for 34 yards.

Weems signed a two-year extension with the Falcons on March 6, 2015. Weems saw action in all 16 games. He had one reception for 11 yards. Weems returned 15 kicks for 403 yards. He also returned 19 punts for 221 yards.

In the 2016 season, Weems was part of a record-breaking Falcons team. On September 18, 2016, he returned a punt for a career-long 73 yards against the Oakland Raiders. Weems and the Falcons reached Super Bowl LI, where they faced the New England Patriots. In the Super Bowl, Weems had two kick returns for 25 total yards and one punt return for no yards. the Falcons fell in a 34–28 overtime defeat.

=== Tennessee Titans ===
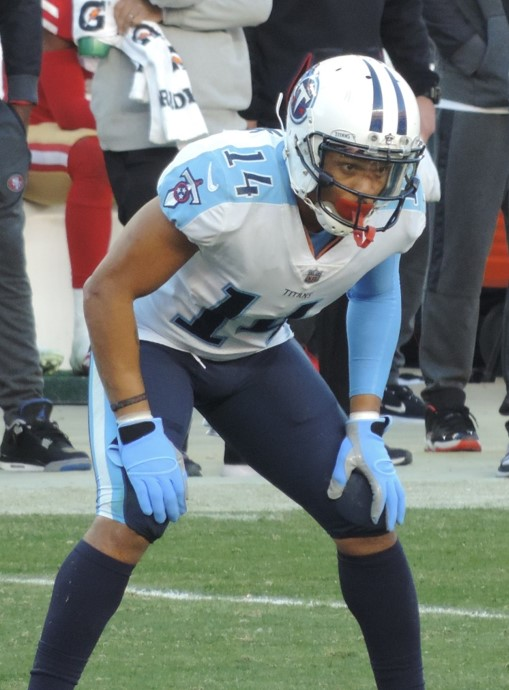
Weems with the Titans in 2017

On March 10, 2017, Weems signed with the Tennessee Titans. He was released on September 2, 2017, but was re-signed the next day. In the 2017 season, Weems mainly played on a special teams role for the Titans.

On March 9, 2018, Weems was released by the Titans.

== NFL career statistics ==
Year	Team	GP	Receiving							Punt return					Kick return					Fumbles	
Year	Team	GP	Rec	Tgt	Yds	Avg	Lng	TD	FD	Att	Yds	TD	FC	Lng	Att	Yds	TD	FC	Lng	Fum	Lost
2008	ATL	6	1	1	4	4.0	4	0	0	0	0	0	0	0	1	19	0	0	19	0	0
2009	ATL	16	6	6	50	8.3	30	2	3	27	270	0	14	28	48	1,214	0	0	62	0	0
2010	ATL	16	6	6	61	10.2	18	0	3	18	230	1	19	55	40	1,100	1	0	102	0	0
2011	ATL	16	11	14	90	8.2	18	0	5	32	315	0	19	42	24	563	0	0	37	0	0
2012	CHI	16	2	4	27	13.5	18	0	2	1	0	0	1	0	13	231	0	0	27	0	0
2013	CHI	16	1	2	8	8.0	8	0	1	0	0	0	1	0	5	57	0	0	19	0	0
2014	ATL	16	10	11	102	10.2	40	2	5	0	0	0	0	0	2	34	0	0	17	0	0
2015	ATL	16	1	1	11	11.0	11	0	1	19	221	0	16	41	15	403	0	0	50	0	0
2016	ATL	16	0	0	0	0.0	0	0	0	24	273	0	21	73	17	391	0	0	42	0	0
2017	TEN	16	1	2	5	5.0	5	0	0	2	15	0	0	13	2	18	0	0	18	0	0
Total		150	39	47	358	9.2	40	4	20	123	1,324	1	91	73	167	4,030	1	0	102	0	0
