= 2010 Atlanta Falcons season =

NFL team season

- Owner: Arthur Blank
- General manager: Thomas Dimitroff
- Head coach: Mike Smith
- Offensive coordinator: Mike Mularkey
- Defensive coordinator: Brian VanGorder
- Home stadium: Georgia Dome

Results
- Record: 13–3
- Division place: 1st NFC South
- Playoffs: Lost Divisional Playoffs (vs. Packers) 21–48
- Pro Bowlers: QB Matt Ryan; WR Roddy White; RB Michael Turner; TE Tony Gonzalez; FB Ovie Mughelli; DE John Abraham; WR/RS Eric Weems; CB Brent Grimes; T Tyson Clabo

Uniform
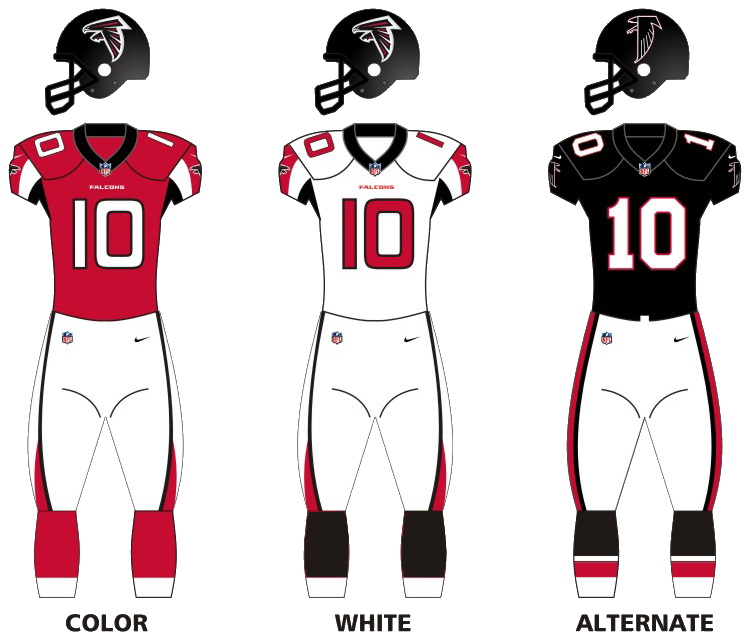

The 2010 season was the Atlanta Falcons' 45th in the National Football League (NFL), their 19th playing home games at Georgia Dome and their third under head coach Mike Smith.

The Falcons improved on their 2009 record, winning 13 games. The team won their first NFC South title since 2004, a bye in the first round of the playoffs, and the top seed in the NFC. In the playoffs, the Falcons fell to the #6 seeded and eventual Super Bowl XLV champion Green Bay Packers in the NFC Divisional Round with an upset 48–21 loss.

== Offseason ==
Falcons re-signed WR Brian Finneran to a 1-year deal on February 11, 2010.

Falcons re-signed CB Brian Williams to a 1-year deal on March 4, 2010.

Falcons signed CB Dunta Robinson to a 6-year deal on March 5, 2010.

Falcons re-signed LS Joe Zelenka to a deal on March 8, 2010.

Falcons re-signed CB Brent Grimes to a deal on March 9, 2010.

Falcons cut CB Tye Hill and signed S Matt Giordano on March 16, 2010.

=== 2010 NFL draft ===
After finishing the season 9–7 and out of the playoffs, the Falcons will pick 19th in the draft. The Falcons traded their second round pick to the Kansas City Chiefs after trading for tight end Tony Gonzalez, and their seventh round pick to the St. Louis Rams for cornerback Tye Hill.

2010 Atlanta Falcons draft
| Round | Pick | Player | Position | College | Notes |
| 1 | 19 | Sean Weatherspoon | OLB | Missouri | |
| 3 | 83 | Corey Peters | DT | Kentucky | |
| 3 | 98 | Mike Johnson | OT | Alabama | Compensatory pick |
| 4 | 117 | Joe Hawley | C | UNLV | |
| 5 | 135 | Dominique Franks | CB | Oklahoma | from Washington via St. Louis |
| 5 | 165 | Kerry Meier | WR | Kansas | Compensatory pick |
| 6 | 171 | Shann Schillinger | S | Montana | from Detroit |
Made roster

== Staff ==
Atlanta Falcons 2010 staff
| Front office: Owner/CEO – Arthur Blank; President – Rich McKay; general manager – Thomas Dimitroff; Director of football administration – Nick Polk; Director of player personnel – Les Snead; Assistant director of player personnel – Lionel Vital; Director of college scouting – David Caldwell; Head coaches: Head coach – Mike Smith; Assistant head coach/quarterbacks – Bill Musgrave; Assistant to the head coach – Andrew Weidinger; Offensive coaches: Offensive coordinator – Mike Mularkey; Running backs – Gerald Brown; Wide receivers – Terry Robiskie; Tight ends – Chris Scelfo; Offensive line – Paul T. Boudreau; Assistant offensive line – Paul Dunn; Offensive assistant – Glenn Thomas | Defensive coaches: Defensive coordinator – Brian VanGorder; Defensive line – Ray Hamilton; Linebackers – Glenn Pires; Defensive backs – Alvin Reynolds; Secondary – Tim Lewis; Defensive assistant – Mark Collins; Special teams coaches: Special teams coordinator – Keith Armstrong; Assistant special teams – Eric Sutulovich; Strength and conditioning: Director of athletic performance – Jeff Fish; Assistant strength and conditioning – Bill Hughan; Strength and conditioning assistant – Jonas Beauchemin |

== Final roster ==
2010 Atlanta Falcons roster
| Quarterbacks (QB): 8 Chris Redman; 2 Matt Ryan; 4 John Parker Wilson; Running backs (RB): 27 Gartrell Johnson; 34 Ovie Mughelli FB; 35 Antone Smith; 44 Jason Snelling; 33 Michael Turner; Wide receivers (WR): 83 Harry Douglas; 86 Brian Finneran; 12 Michael Jenkins; 14 Eric Weems RS; 84 Roddy White; Tight ends (TE): 88 Tony Gonzalez; 81 Michael Palmer; 87 Justin Peelle | Offensive linemen (OL): 72 Sam Baker T; 63 Justin Blalock G; 77 Tyson Clabo T; 73 Harvey Dahl G; 61 Joe Hawley C/G; 79 Mike Johnson G; 62 Todd McClure C; 75 Garrett Reynolds T; 74 Will Svitek T; Defensive linemen (DL): 55 John Abraham DE; 98 Jamaal Anderson DE; 95 Jonathan Babineaux DT; 71 Kroy Biermann DE; 92 Chauncey Davis DE; 94 Peria Jerry DT; 97 Trey Lewis DT; 91 Corey Peters DT; 90 Lawrence Sidbury DE; 99 Vance Walker DT | Linebackers (LB): 59 Spencer Adkins OLB; 50 Curtis Lofton MLB; 54 Stephen Nicholas OLB; 53 Mike Peterson OLB; 56 Sean Weatherspoon MLB; 52 Coy Wire MLB; Defensive backs (DB): 36 Rafael Bush FS; 26 Erik Coleman SS; 28 Thomas DeCoud FS; 24 Dominique Franks CB; 20 Brent Grimes CB; 25 William Moore SS; 21 Chris Owens CB; 23 Dunta Robinson CB; 29 Brian Williams CB; Special teams (ST): 3 Matt Bryant K; 9 Michael Koenen P; 82 Joe Zelenka LS | Practice squad: 48 Robbie Agnone TE (IR); 85 Marquez Branson TE; 67 Rob Bruggeman C; 16 Tim Buckley WR; 17 Brandyn Harvey WR; 51 Robert James LB; 96 Emmanuel Stephens DE; 15 Andy Strickland WR; 65 Jose Valdez T; Reserve: 93 Thomas Johnson DT (IR); 80 Kerry Meier WR (IR); 32 Jerious Norwood RB (IR); 39 Shann Schillinger FS (IR); Rookies in italics 53 active, 5 reserve, 8 practice squad |

== Schedule ==
=== Preseason ===
The Falcons preseason schedule was announced on March 31, 2010.

| Week | Date | Opponent | Result | Record | Venue | Recap |
|---|---|---|---|---|---|---|
| 1 | August 13 | Kansas City Chiefs | W 20–10 | 1–0 | Georgia Dome | Recap |
| 2 | August 19 | New England Patriots | L 10–28 | 1–1 | Georgia Dome | Recap |
| 3 | August 27 | at Miami Dolphins | W 16–6 | 2–1 | Sun Life Stadium | Recap |
| 4 | September 2 | at Jacksonville Jaguars | L 9–13 | 2–2 | EverBank Field | Recap |

=== Regular season ===
| Week | Date | Opponent | Result | Record | Venue | Recap |
|---|---|---|---|---|---|---|
| 1 | September 12 | at Pittsburgh Steelers | L 9–15 (OT) | 0–1 | Heinz Field | Recap |
| 2 | September 19 | Arizona Cardinals | W 41–7 | 1–1 | Georgia Dome | Recap |
| 3 | September 26 | at New Orleans Saints | W 27–24 (OT) | 2–1 | Louisiana Superdome | Recap |
| 4 | October 3 | San Francisco 49ers | W 16–14 | 3–1 | Georgia Dome | Recap |
| 5 | October 10 | at Cleveland Browns | W 20–10 | 4–1 | Cleveland Browns Stadium | Recap |
| 6 | October 17 | at Philadelphia Eagles | L 17–31 | 4–2 | Lincoln Financial Field | Recap |
| 7 | October 24 | Cincinnati Bengals | W 39–32 | 5–2 | Georgia Dome | Recap |
| 8 | Bye | | | | | |
| 9 | November 7 | Tampa Bay Buccaneers | W 27–21 | 6–2 | Georgia Dome | Recap |
| 10 | November 11 | Baltimore Ravens | W 26–21 | 7–2 | Georgia Dome | Recap |
| 11 | November 21 | at St. Louis Rams | W 34–17 | 8–2 | Edward Jones Dome | Recap |
| 12 | November 28 | Green Bay Packers | W 20–17 | 9–2 | Georgia Dome | Recap |
| 13 | December 5 | at Tampa Bay Buccaneers | W 28–24 | 10–2 | Raymond James Stadium | Recap |
| 14 | December 12 | at Carolina Panthers | W 31–10 | 11–2 | Bank of America Stadium | Recap |
| 15 | December 19 | at Seattle Seahawks | W 34–18 | 12–2 | Qwest Field | Recap |
| 16 | December 27 | New Orleans Saints | L 14–17 | 12–3 | Georgia Dome | Recap |
| 17 | January 2 | Carolina Panthers | W 31–10 | 13–3 | Georgia Dome | Recap |

== Standings ==
NFC South
| | W | L | T | PCT | DIV | CONF | PF | PA | STK |
|---|---|---|---|---|---|---|---|---|---|
| ^{(1)} Atlanta Falcons | 13 | 3 | 0 | .813 | 5–1 | 10–2 | 414 | 288 | W1 |
| ^{(5)} New Orleans Saints | 11 | 5 | 0 | .688 | 4–2 | 9–3 | 384 | 307 | L1 |
| Tampa Bay Buccaneers | 10 | 6 | 0 | .625 | 3–3 | 8–4 | 343 | 318 | W2 |
| Carolina Panthers | 2 | 14 | 0 | .125 | 0–6 | 2–10 | 196 | 408 | L2 |

== Regular season results ==
=== Week 1: at Pittsburgh Steelers ===
Week 1: Atlanta Falcons at Pittsburgh Steelers – Game summary

| Quarter | 1 | 2 | 3 | 4 | OT | Total |
|---|---|---|---|---|---|---|
| Falcons | 0 | 3 | 3 | 3 | 0 | 9 |
| Steelers | 3 | 0 | 3 | 3 | 6 | 15 |

at Heinz Field, Pittsburgh, Pennsylvania

- Date: September 12
- Game time: 1:00 p.m. EDT
- Game weather: 65 °F (18 °C) (Cloudy)
- Game attendance: 63,609
- Referee: Scott Green
- TV announcers (Fox): Dick Stockton, Charles Davis, Jim Mora, & Laura Okmin
- Recap

Game information

First quarter

- PIT – Jeff Reed 52-yard field goal, Steelers 3–0, Drive: 11 plays, 42 yards, 7:09.

Second quarter

- ATL – Matt Bryant 49-yard field goal, Tied 3–3, Drive: 4 plays, 24 yards, 0:17.

Third quarter

- ATL – Matt Bryant 39-yard field goal, Falcons 6–3, Drive: 13 plays, 56 yards, 4:20.
- PIT – Jeff Reed 36-yard field goal, Tied 6–6, Drive: 6 plays, 62 yards, 3:47.

Fourth quarter

- PIT – Jeff Reed 34-yard field goal, Steelers 9–6, Drive: 10 plays, 67 yards, 5:07.
- ATL – Matt Bryant 23-yard field goal, Tied 9–9, Drive: 13 plays, 64 yards, 5:30.

Overtime

- PIT – Rashard Mendenhall 50-yard run, Steelers 15–9, Drive: 1 plays, 50 yards, 0:11.

Top passers

- ATL – Matt Ryan – 27/44, 252 yards, 1 interception
- PIT – Dennis Dixon – 18/26, 236 yards, 1 interception

Top rushers

- ATL – Michael Turner – 19 rushes, 42 yards
- PIT – Rashard Mendenhall – 22 rushes, 120 yards, 1 touchdown

Top receivers

- ATL – Roddy White – 13 receptions, 111 yards
- PIT – Hines Ward – 6 receptions, 108 yards

Top tacklers

- ATL – Curtis Lofton – 9 tackles, 3 assists, 1 sack
- PIT – Bryant McFadden – 12 tackles, 2 assists

The Falcons began their season at Heinz Field for an interconference duel against the Pittsburgh Steelers. The Steelers were without quarterback Ben Roethlisberger who was suspended for the first four games of the season. Dennis Dixon started in his place. The Steelers received the opening kick and drove 42 yards in 11 plays with Dixon going 4/4 for 21 yards on the drive, that led to Steelers kicker Jeff Reed nailing a 52-yard field goal, the longest field goal in Heinz Field history. The Falcons offense was non-existent almost entirely in the first half, going three-and- out on their first two drives. In the second quarter, following the Falcons second punt, the Steelers drove 28 yards to the Falcons 35, but Dixon was intercepted by Falcons linebacker Mike Petersen. The Falcons drove 44 yards to the Steelers 28, but Matt Bryant missed a 46-yard field goal. Jeff Reed then missed a 55-yarder. The Falcons drove 24 yards to the Steelers 31-yard line, and Bryant was successful from 48 yards out as the game went to halftime tied at 3–3.

Atlanta drove 55 yards in 13 plays on the first drive of the 2nd quarter, which took 4:20 off the clock, to take the lead on Bryant's 39-yard field goal. However, Pittsburgh would respond, driving 67 yards on 6 plays, taking 3:47 off the clock, and tying the game with Reed's 34-yard field goal. In the fourth quarter, the Steelers would get the lead again, driving 67 yards on 10 plays taking 5:07 off the clock, on Reed's 34-yard field goal, yet the Falcons would strike back. Ryan engineered a 13-play, 73-yard drive taking 5:30 off the clock, and ending with Bryant's 23-yard field goal, tying the score at 9–9 with 3:28 remaining. After a Pittsburgh punt, Troy Polamalu intercepted Matt Ryan at the Atlanta 30. In a golden opportunity to win the game, Pittsburgh drove 9 yards to the Atlanta 21, but Jeff Reed missed a 40-yard field goal wide ride with 0:43 left. Atlanta drained the clock, sending the game into overtime. Atlanta had possession first in overtime, but punted after 5 plays. It was a bad punt, going only 36 yards to midfield. Pittsburgh delivered the final strike in overtime as running back Rashard Mendenhall got the game-winning 50-yard touchdown run, on Pittsburgh's first play.

With the loss, Atlanta began their season at 0–1.

=== Week 2: vs. Arizona Cardinals ===
Week 2: Arizona Cardinals at Atlanta Falcons – Game summary

| Quarter | 1 | 2 | 3 | 4 | Total |
|---|---|---|---|---|---|
| Cardinals | 0 | 7 | 0 | 0 | 7 |
| Falcons | 7 | 17 | 10 | 7 | 41 |

at Georgia Dome, Atlanta, Georgia

- Date: September 19
- Game time: 1:00 pm. EDT
- Game weather: None (dome stadium)
- Game attendance: 66,824
- Referee: Jerome Boger
- TV announcers (Fox): Thom Brennaman, Brian Billick and Charissa Thompson
- Recap

Game information

First quarter

- ATL – Roddy White 7-yard pass from Matt Ryan (Matt Bryant kick), Falcons 7–0, Drive: 9 plays, 70 yards, 4:27.

Second quarter

- ATL – Matt Bryant 24-yard field goal, Falcons 10–0, Drive: 6 plays, 37 yards, 3:24.
- ARI – Tim Hightower 80-yard run (Jay Feely kick), Falcons 10–7, Drive: 1 plays, 80 yards, 0:12.
- ATL – Jason Snelling 19-yard pass from Matt Ryan (Matt Bryant kick), Falcons 17–7, Drive: 9 plays, 72 yards, 3:36.
- ATL – Jason Snelling 1-yard run (Matt Bryant kick), Falcons 24–7, Drive: 8 plays, 78 yards, 3:58.

Third quarter

- ATL – Brian Finneran 12-yard pass from Matt Ryan (Matt Bryant kick), Falcons 31–7, Drive: 3 plays, 14 yards, 0:45.
- ATL – Matt Bryant 35-yard field goal, Falcons 34–7, Drive: 16 plays, 69 yards, 6:37.

Fourth quarter

- ATL – Jason Snelling 7-yard run (Matt Bryant kick), Falcons 41–7, Drive: 11 plays, 80 yards, 6:41.

Top passers

- ARI – Derek Anderson – 17/31, 161 yards, 2 interceptions
- ATL – Matt Ryan – 21/32, 225 yards, 3 touchdowns

Top rushers

- ARI – Tim Hightower – 11 rushes, 115 yards, 1 touchdown
- ATL – Jason Snelling – 24 rushes, 129 yards, 2 touchdowns

Top receivers

- ARI – Larry Fitzgerald – 7 receptions, 83 yards
- ATL – Roddy White – 7 receptions, 78 yards, 1 touchdown

Top tacklers

- ARI – Paris Lenon – 9 tackles, 2 assists
- ATL – Sean Weatherspoon – 8 tackles, 1 assist, 1 sack

Hoping to rebound from their loss to the Steelers the Falcons played at home an NFC duel against the Arizona Cardinals. In the first quarter Atlanta took the early lead as QB Matt Ryan completed a 7-yard TD pass to WR Roddy White, followed in the second quarter by kicker Matt Bryant hitting a 24-yard field goal. Arizona would reply with RB Tim Hightower scampering 80 yards for a TD run, but Atlanta increased their lead when Ryan threw a 19-yard TD pass to FB Jason Snelling, followed by Snelling getting a 1-yard TD run. In the third quarter the Falcons continued to dominate the game when Ryan completed a 12-yard touchdown pass to WR Brian Finneran, followed by Bryan nailing a 35-yard field goal. In the fourth quarter Atlanta scored once again with FB Jason Snelling getting a 7-yard TD run.

With the win, Atlanta improved to 1–1.

=== Week 3: at New Orleans Saints ===
Week 3: Atlanta Falcons at New Orleans Saints – Game summary

| Quarter | 1 | 2 | 3 | 4 | OT | Total |
|---|---|---|---|---|---|---|
| Falcons | 7 | 7 | 3 | 7 | 3 | 27 |
| Saints | 14 | 0 | 7 | 3 | 0 | 24 |

at Louisiana Superdome, New Orleans, Louisiana

- Date: September 26
- Game time: 1:00 pm. EDT
- Game weather: None (dome stadium)
- Game attendance: 70,051
- Referee: Walt Anderson
- TV announcers (Fox): Thom Brennaman, Brian Billick and Charissa Thompson
- Recap

Game information

First quarter

- NO – Jeremy Shockey 2-yard pass from Drew Brees (Garrett Hartley kick), Saints 7–0, Drive: 3 plays, 6 yards, 1:22.
- ATL – Tony Gonzalez 13-yard pass from Matt Ryan (Matt Bryant kick), Tied 7–7, Drive: 9 plays, 80 yards, 4:49.
- NO – Lance Moore 80-yard pass from Drew Brees (Garrett Hartley kick), Saints 14–7, Drive: 4 plays, 86 yards, 2:01.

Second quarter

- ATL – Michael Turner 1-yard run (Matt Bryant kick), Tied 14–14, Drive: 19 plays, 72 yards, 10:39.

Third quarter

- ATL – Matt Bryant 23-yard field goal, Falcons 17–14, Drive: 11 plays, 63 yards, 5:04.
- NO – Lance Moore 16-yard pass from Drew Brees (Garrett Hartley kick), Saints 21–17, Drive: 5 plays, 42 yards, 2:28.

Fourth quarter

- ATL – Roddy White 22-yard pass from Matt Ryan (Matt Bryant kick), Falcons 24–21, Drive: 9 plays, 80 yards, 5:44.
- NO – Garrett Hartley 32-yard field goal, Tied 24–24, Drive: 11 plays, 48 yards, 3:28.

Overtime

- ATL – Matt Bryant 46-yard field goal, Falcons 27–24, Drive: 12 plays, 52 yards, 7:02.

Top passers

- ATL – Matt Ryan – 19/30, 228 yards, 2 touchdowns
- NO – Drew Brees – 30/38, 365 yards, 3 touchdowns, 2 interceptions

Top rushers

- ATL – Michael Turner – 30 rushes, 114 yards, 1 touchdown
- NO – Pierre Thomas – 9 rushes, 30 yards

Top receivers

- ATL – Tony Gonzalez – 8 receptions, 110 yards, 1 touchdown
- NO – Lance Moore – 6 receptions, 149 yards, 2 touchdowns

Top tacklers

- ATL – Curtis Lofton – 6 tackles, 2 assists
- NO – Jonathan Vilma – 8 tackles, 3 assists

Coming off their win over the Cardinals the Falcons traveled to Louisiana Superdome for an NFC South rivalry match against the New Orleans Saints. The Falcons trailed early when QB Drew Brees made a 2-yard TD pass to TE Jeremy Shockey. The Falcons replied with QB Matt Ryan making a 13-yard TD pass to TE Tony Gonzalez. The Saints re-took the lead with Brees finding WR Lance Moore on an 80-yard TD pass. But the Falcons replied in the second quarter driving 72 yards in 19 plays, taking 10:39 off the clock ending with RB Michael Turner plunging into the end zone on a 1-yard TD run. The Falcons took the lead when kicker Matt Bryant booted a 23-yard field goal. But they fell behind with Brees finding Moore again on a 16-yard TD pass. The Falcons we're able to retake the lead when Ryan rifled a 22-yard TD pass to WR Roddy White. However, Drew Brees drove the Saints into field goal range and they would tie the game with kicker Garrett Hartley making a 32-yard field goal. In overtime, the Saints drove down to the goal line but kicker Hartley missed a 29-yard, chip shot field goal. Matt Ryan drove the Falcons back down the other direction and Matt Bryant hit a 46-yard field goal to give the Falcons the win.

With the win, not only the Falcons improved to 2–1 but finally won their first game in New Orleans since 2002.

=== Week 4: vs. San Francisco 49ers ===
Week 4: San Francisco 49ers at Atlanta Falcons – Game summary

| Quarter | 1 | 2 | 3 | 4 | Total |
|---|---|---|---|---|---|
| 49ers | 14 | 0 | 0 | 0 | 14 |
| Falcons | 0 | 10 | 3 | 3 | 16 |

at Georgia Dome, Atlanta, Georgia

- Date: October 3
- Game time: 1:00 pm. EDT
- Game weather: None (dome stadium)
- Game attendance: 66,874
- Referee: Tony Corrente
- TV announcers (Fox): Dick Stockton, Charles Davis, Jim Mora & Laura Okmin
- Recap

Game information

First quarter

- SF – Vernon Davis 12-yard pass from Alex Smith (Joe Nedney kick), 49ers 7–0, Drive: 10 plays, 88 yards, 6:16.
- SF – Taylor Mays blocked punt recovery in end zone (Joe Nedney kick), 49ers 14–0.

Second quarter

- ATL – Harry Douglas 8-yard pass from Matt Ryan (Matt Bryant kick), 49ers 14–7, Drive: 12 plays, 71 yards, 6:17.
- ATL – Matt Bryant 37-yard field goal, 49ers 14–10, Drive: 11 plays, 49 yards, 1:13.

Third quarter

- ATL – Matt Bryant 31-yard field goal, 49ers 14–13, Drive: 7 plays, 41 yards, 3:27.

Fourth quarter

- ATL – Matt Bryant 43-yard field goal, Falcons 16–14, Drive: 12 plays, 68 yards, 1:20.

Top passers

- SF – Alex Smith – 21/32, 188 yards, 1 touchdown, 2 interceptions
- ATL – Matt Ryan – 26/43, 273 yards, 1 touchdown, 2 interceptions

Top rushers

- SF – Frank Gore – 21 rushes, 77 yards
- ATL – Michael Turner – 16 rushes, 50 yards

Top receivers

- SF – Frank Gore – 7 receptions, 60 yards
- ATL – Roddy White – 7 receptions, 104 yards

Top tacklers

- SF – Taylor Mays – 9 tackles, 2 assists
- ATL – Stephen Nicholas – 12 tackles, 1 assist

Hoping to increase their winning streak after a win against the Saints, the Falcons played inside their dome for an NFC duel against the San Francisco 49ers. In the first quarter the Falcons trailed early with QB Alex Smith making a 12-yard TD pass to TE Vernon Davis. The Falcons problems continued when Michael Koenen's punt was blocked and recovered in their own endzone by DB Taylor Mays, putting the 49ers up 14–0. Then the Falcons replied with QB Matt Ryan completing an 8-yard TD pass to WR Harry Douglas. Then the Falcons took the lead with three field goals from kicker Matt Bryant. He made a 37-yard field goal near the end of the 2nd quarter and a 31-yard field goad in the 3rd. Under two minutes to play with the Falcons trailing 14–13, Ryan threw an interception to the 49ers' Nate Clements who appeared to be headed to the end zone and clinch the win. However wide receiver Roddy White chased him down and stripped the football which was recovered by Atlanta's Harvey Dahl. Ryan then engineered a drive in the other direction and Bryant kicks a 43-yard field goal with two seconds left giving the Falcons another win.

With the win, Atlanta improved to 3–1.

=== Week 5: at Cleveland Browns ===
Week 5: Atlanta Falcons at Cleveland Browns – Game summary

| Quarter | 1 | 2 | 3 | 4 | Total |
|---|---|---|---|---|---|
| Falcons | 0 | 6 | 7 | 7 | 20 |
| Browns | 0 | 7 | 3 | 0 | 10 |

at Cleveland Browns Stadium, Cleveland, Ohio

- Date: October 10
- Game time: 1:00 pm. EDT
- Game weather: 71 °F (22 °C) (Sunny)
- Game attendance: 65,290
- Referee: John Parry
- TV announcers (Fox): Chris Myers and Charles Davis
- Recap

Game information

First quarter Second quarter

- ATL – (14:52) Matt Bryant 24-yard field goal, Falcons 3–0, Drive: 12 plays, 66 yards, 4:21.
- CLE – (12:25) Peyton Hillis 19-yard pass from Seneca Wallace (Phil Dawson kick), Browns 7–3, Drive: 5 plays, 56 yards, 2:30.
- ATL – (5:04) Matt Bryant 30-yard field goal, Browns 7–6, Drive: 14 plays, 70 yards, 7:19.

Third quarter

- CLE – (10:00) Phil Dawson 19-yard field goal, Browns 10–6, Drive: 6 plays, 22 yards, 3:07.
- ATL – (8:05) Roddy White 45-yard pass from Matt Ryan (Matt Bryant kick), Falcons 13–10, Drive: 4 plays, 68 yards, 2:00.

Fourth quarter

- ATL – (4:14) Kroy Biermann 31-yard interception return (Matt Bryant kick), Falcons 20–10.

Top passers

- ATL -Matt Ryan – 16/28, 187 yards, 1 touchdown
- CLE – Seneca Wallace – 11/15, 139 yards, 1 touchdown

Top rushers

- ATL – Michael Turner – 19 rushes, 140 yards
- CLE – Peyton Hillis – 10 rushes, 28 yards

Top receivers

- ATL – Roddy White – 5 receptions, 101 yards, 1 touchdown
- CLE – Mohamed Massaquoi – 5 receptions, 55 yards

Top tacklers

- ATL – Dunta Robinson – 6 tackles
- CLE – Matt Roth – 6 tackles, 2 assists

Coming off their win over the 49ers the Falcons flew to Cleveland Browns Stadium for an Interconference duel against the Cleveland BrownsAfter a scoreless 1st quarter, the Falcons got things started in the 2nd quarter. Matt Bryant converted a 24-yard field goal. The Browns replied and took the lead with QB Seneca Wallace's 19-yard TD pass to RB Peyton Hillis. The Falcons tried to cut the lead when Bryant made a 30-yard field goal, but was expanded again in the 3rd quarter with kicker Phil Dawson hitting a 19-yard field goal. After that, the Falcons scored when QB Matt Ryan connected with WR Roddy White on a 45-yard TD pass. The game was a defensive drag out the rest of the way. In the 4th quarter DE Kroy Biermann returned an interception 41 yards to the endzone for a touchdown, sealing the Falcons' 4th straight win.

With the win, Atlanta improved to 4–1.

=== Week 6: at Philadelphia Eagles ===
Week 6: Atlanta Falcons at Philadelphia Eagles – Game summary

| Quarter | 1 | 2 | 3 | 4 | Total |
|---|---|---|---|---|---|
| Falcons | 0 | 7 | 3 | 7 | 17 |
| Eagles | 14 | 7 | 7 | 3 | 31 |

at Lincoln Financial Field, Philadelphia, Pennsylvania

- Date: October 17
- Game time: 1:00 pm. EDT
- Game weather: 66 °F (19 °C), sunny
- Game attendance: 69,144
- Referee: Walt Coleman
- TV announcers (Fox): Kenny Albert, Daryl Johnston and Tony Siragusa
- Recap

Game information

First quarter

- PHI – DeSean Jackson 31-yard run (David Akers kick), Eagles 7–0, Drive: 2 plays, 53 yards, 0:50.
- PHI – DeSean Jackson 34-yard pass from Kevin Kolb (David Akers kick), Eagles 14–0, Drive: 6 plays, 69 yards, 2:28.

Second quarter

- PHI – Jeremy Maclin 8-yard pass from Kevin Kolb (David Akers kick), Eagles 21–0, Drive: 7 plays, 34 yards, 2:59.
- ATL – Tony Gonzalez 1-yard pass from Matt Ryan (Matt Bryant kick), Eagles 21–7, Drive: 4 plays, 31 yards, 0:38.

Third quarter

- ATL – Matt Bryant 26-yard field goal, Eagles 21–10, Drive: 14 plays, 65 yards, 6:26.
- PHI – Jeremy Maclin 83-yard pass from Kevin Kolb (David Akers kick), Eagles 28–10, Drive: 2 plays, 80 yards, 0:48.

Fourth quarter

- ATL – Tony Gonzalez 13-yard pass from Matt Ryan (Matt Bryant kick), Eagles 28–17, Drive: 7 plays, 73 yards, 1:41.
- PHI – David Akers 30-yard field goal, Eagles 31–17, Drive: 7 plays, 32 yards, 2:39.

Top passers

- ATL – Matt Ryan – 23/42, 250 yards, 2 touchdowns, 1 interception
- PHI – Kevin Kolb – 23/29, 326 yards, 3 touchdowns, 1 interception

Top rushers

- ATL – Michael Turner – 15 rushes, 45 yards
- PHI – LeSean McCoy – 21 rushes, 64 yards

Top receivers

- ATL – Michael Jenkins – 5 receptions, 99 yards
- PHI – Jeremy Maclin – 7 receptions, 159 yards, 2 touchdowns

Top tacklers

- ATL – Curtis Lofton – 11 tackles, 3 assists
- PHI – Stewart Bradley – 5 tackles, 2 sacks, 1 forced fumble

Hoping to increase their winning streak the Falcons flew to Lincoln Financial Field for an NFC duel against the Philadelphia Eagles. In the first quarter the Falcons trailed early as WR DeSean Jackson raced through the defense on a 31-yard TD run. Later, QB Kevin Kolb connected with him on a 34-yard TD pass. The Falcons' secondary continued to struggle when Kolb found WR Jeremy Maclin on an 8-yard TD pass. Facing, a 21–0 deficit, the Falcons replied with QB Matt Ryan hitting TE Tony Gonzalez on a 1-yard TD pass. This was followed in the third quarter by kicker Matt Bryant hitting a 26-yard field goal. However, the Falcons fell further behind when Kolb found Maclin again on an amazing 83-yard TD pass. The Falcons replied with Ryan hitting Gonzalez, again, on a 13-yard TD pass. The Eagles pulled away with All-Pro kicker David Akers making a 30-yard field goal.

With the loss, Atlanta fell to 4–2.

=== Week 7: vs. Cincinnati Bengals ===
Week 7: Cincinnati Bengals at Atlanta Falcons – Game summary

| Quarter | 1 | 2 | 3 | 4 | Total |
|---|---|---|---|---|---|
| Bengals | 3 | 0 | 22 | 7 | 32 |
| Falcons | 7 | 17 | 0 | 15 | 39 |

at Georgia Dome, Atlanta, Georgia

- Date: October 24
- Game time: 1:00 pm. EDT
- Game weather: None (dome stadium)
- Game attendance: 67,665
- Referee: Alberto Riveron
- TV announcers (CBS): Gus Johnson and Steve Tasker
- Recap

Game information

First quarter

- ATL – Brian Finneran 3-yard pass from Matt Ryan (Matt Bryant kick), Falcons 7–0, Drive: 8 plays, 83 yards, 4:50.
- CIN – Mike Nugent 20-yard field goal, Falcons 7–3, Drive: 9 plays, 58 yards, 4:24.

Second quarter

- ATL – Matt Bryant 45-yard field goal, Falcons 10–3, Drive: 7 plays, 54 yards, 1:52.
- ATL – Roddy White 11-yard pass from Matt Ryan (Matt Bryant kick), Falcons 17–3, Drive: 5 plays, 79 yards, 1:52.
- ATL – Michael Turner 2-yard run (Matt Bryant kick) Falcons 24–3, Drive: 11 plays, 83 yards, 5:31.

Third quarter

- CIN – Mike Nugent 33-yard field goal, Falcons 24–6, Drive: 11 plays, 59 yards, 5:26.
- CIN – Terrell Owens 19-yard pass from Carson Palmer (Mike Nugent kick), Falcons 24–13, Drive: 6 plays, 88 yards, 3:18.
- CIN – Jordan Shipley 64-yard pass from Carson Palmer (pass failed), Falcons 24–19, Drive: 3 plays, 62 yards, 1:19.
- CIN – Adam Jones 59-yard fumble return (pass failed), Bengals 25–24.

Fourth quarter

- ATL – Roddy White 11-yard pass from Matt Ryan (Matt Ryan – Roddy White pass), Falcons 32–25, Drive: 8 plays, 74 yards, 3:14.
- ATL – Michael Turner 3-yard run (Matt Bryant kick), Falcons 39–25, Drive: 10 plays, 48 yards, 5:04.
- CIN – Chad Ochocinco 8-yard pass from Carson Palmer (Mike Nugent kick), Falcons 39–32, Drive: 11 plays, 86 yards, 3:00.

Top passers

- CIN – Carson Palmer – 36/50, 412 yards, 3 touchdowns
- ATL – Matt Ryan – 24/33, 299 yards, 3 touchdowns, 1 interceptions

Top rushers

- CIN – Cedric Benson – 20 rushes, 70 yards
- ATL – Michael Turner – 23 rushes, 121 yards, 2 touchdowns

Top receivers

- CIN – Jordan Shipley – 6 receptions, 131 yards, 1 touchdowns
- ATL – Roddy White – 11 receptions, 201 yards, 2 touchdowns

Top tacklers

- CIN – Dhani Jones – 7 tackles, 1 assist
- ATL – Chris Owens – 10 tackles, 1 assist

Hoping to rebound from their loss to the Eagles the Falcons played inside their dome for an inter-conference duel against the Bengals. In the first quarter the Falcons took the lead as QB Matt Ryan connected on a 3-yard TD pass to unheralded WR Brian Finneran. But the Bengals replied with kicker Mike Nugent making a 20-yard field goal. The Falcons dominated the second quarter, going on a 17–0 run. Kicker Matt Bryant hitting a 45-yard field goal. Then Ryan found deep threat WR Roddy White, who would eventually lead the NFL with 115 receptions, on a 43-yard TD pass, followed by eventual rushing yards leader, RB Michael Turner popping into the end zone on a 2-yard TD run. The Bengals rally in the third quarter going on a 22–0 run of their own. Nugent nailed a 33-yard field goal, followed by QB Carson Palmer completing a 19-yard TD pass to WR Terrell Owens. Then Palmer found WR Jordan Shipley on a laser 64-yard TD pass. (With a failed 2-point conversion) Then DB Adam Jones returned a fumble 59 yards to the endzone for a touchdown (With a failed two-point conversion). The Falcons pulled away in the fourth quarter with Ryan throwing an 11-yard TD pass to White. (With the 2-point conversion successful as Ryan passed to White) This was followed by Turner plunging into the end zone on a 3-yard TD run. The Falcons would concede only one touchdown after that as Palmer found WR Chad Ochocinco on an 8-yard TD pass.

With the win, Atlanta went into its bye week at 5–2.

=== Week 9: vs. Tampa Bay Buccaneers ===
Week 9: Tampa Bay Buccaneers at Atlanta Falcons – Game summary

| Quarter | 1 | 2 | 3 | 4 | Total |
|---|---|---|---|---|---|
| Buccaneers | 0 | 14 | 7 | 0 | 21 |
| Falcons | 7 | 10 | 10 | 0 | 27 |

at Georgia Dome, Atlanta, Georgia

- Date: November 7
- Game time: 1:00 pm. EST
- Game weather: None (dome stadium)
- Game attendance: 67,266
- Referee: Terry McAulay
- TV announcers (Fox): Thom Brennaman, Brian Billick, & Chris Myers
- Recap

Game information

First quarter

- ATL – Michael Turner 2-yard run (Matt Bryant kick), Falcons 7–0, Drive: 13 plays, 61 yards, 6:54.

Second quarter

- ATL – Michael Turner 10-yard run (Matt Bryant kick), Falcons 14–0, Drive: 10 plays, 99 yards, 3:59.
- TB – Arrelious Benn 14-yard pass from Josh Freeman (Connor Barth kick), Falcons 14–7, Drive: 4 plays, 32 yards, 1:29.
- ATL – Matt Bryant 31-yard field goal, Falcons 17–7, Drive: 11 plays, 72 yards, 6:43.
- TB – Mike Williams 58-yard pass from Josh Freeman (Connor Barth kick), Falcons 17–14, Drive: 7 plays, 90 yards, 3:21.

Third quarter

- ATL – Michael Palmer 5-yard pass from Matt Ryan (Matt Bryant kick), Falcons 24–14, Drive: 7 plays, 30 yards, 3:03.
- ATL – Matt Bryant 41-yard field goal, Falcons 27–14, Drive: 11 plays, 59 yards, 5:54.
- TB – Micheal Spurlock 89-yard kickoff return (Connor Barth kick), Falcons 27–21, Drive: 0 plays, 0 yards, 0:16.

Fourth quarter

- No scoring plays

Top passers

- TB – Josh Freeman – 11/22, 189 yards, 2 touchdowns, 2 interceptions
- ATL – Matt Ryan – 24/36, 235 yards, 1 touchdown

Top rushers

- TB – LeGarrette Blount – 13 rushes, 46 yards
- ATL – Michael Turner – 24 rushes, 107 yards, 2 touchdowns

Top receivers

- TB – Mike Williams – 4 receptions, 89 yards, 1 touchdown
- ATL – Tony Gonzalez – 8 receptions, 72 yards

Top tacklers

- TB – Quincy Black – 7 tackles, 1 assist
- ATL – Stephen Nicholas – 7 tackles, 1 assist

Coming off their bye week the Falcons returned inside their dome for an NFC South rivalry match against the Buccaneers. The Falcons took the lead as RB Michael Turner got a 2 and a 10-yard TD run. The Buccaneers replied with QB Josh Freeman completing a 14-yard TD pass to WR Arrelious Benn. The Falcons pulled ahead after kicker Matt Bryant got a 31-yard field goal, but the Buccaneers responded after Freeman found WR Mike Williams on a 58-yard TD pass. The Falcons continued to score in the third quarter after QB Matt Ryan threw a 5-yard TD pass to TE Michael Palmer, followed by Bryant hitting a 41-yard field goal. The Buccaneers responded after Micheal Spurlock returned a kickoff 89 yards for a touchdown.

With the win, the Falcons improved to 6–2.

=== Week 10: vs. Baltimore Ravens ===
Week 10: Baltimore Ravens at Atlanta Falcons – Game summary

| Quarter | 1 | 2 | 3 | 4 | Total |
|---|---|---|---|---|---|
| Ravens | 0 | 0 | 7 | 14 | 21 |
| Falcons | 0 | 10 | 3 | 13 | 26 |

at Georgia Dome, Atlanta, Georgia

- Date: November 11
- Game time: 8:20 pm. EST
- Game weather: None (dome stadium)
- Game attendance: 68,474
- Referee: Ron Winter
- TV announcers (NFLN): Bob Papa, Matt Millen and Joe Theismann
- Recap

Game information

First quarter Second quarter

- ATL – Jason Snelling 28-yard pass from Matt Ryan (Matt Bryant kick), Falcons 7–0, Drive: 14 plays, 91 yards, 6:38.
- ATL – Matt Bryant 28-yard field goal, Falcons 10–0, Drive: 12 plays, 33 yards, 4:34.

Third quarter

- ATL – Matt Bryant 51-yard field goal, Falcons 13–0, Drive: 4 plays, 6 yards, 0:59.
- BAL – Anquan Boldin 5-yard pass from Joe Flacco (Billy Cundiff kick), Falcons 13–7, Drive: 10 plays, 65 yards, 6:01.

Fourth quarter

- ATL – Roddy White 4-yard pass from Matt Ryan (Matt Bryant kick), Falcons 20–7, Drive: 11 plays, 75 yards, 5:15.
- BAL – Derrick Mason 6-yard pass from Joe Flacco (Billy Cundiff kick), Falcons 20–14, Drive: 11 plays, 75 yards, 5:52.
- BAL – Todd Heap 9-yard pass from Joe Flacco (Billy Cundiff kick), Ravens 21–20, Drive: 8 plays, 72 yards, 1:52.
- ATL – Roddy White 33-yard pass from Matt Ryan (pass failed), Falcons 26–21, Drive: 7 plays, 80 yards, 0:45.

Top passers

- BAL – Joe Flacco – 22/34, 215 yards, 3 touchdowns, 1 interception
- ATL – Matt Ryan – 32/50, 316 yards, 3 touchdowns

Top rushers

- BAL – Ray Rice – 12 rushes, 59 yards
- ATL – Michael Turner – 17 rushes, 39 yards

Top receivers

- BAL – Todd Heap – 4 receptions, 57 yards, 1 touchdown
- ATL – Roddy White – 12 receptions, 138 yards, 2 touchdowns

Top tacklers

- BAL – Jarret Johnson, Lardarius Webb – 6 tackles
- ATL – Curtis Lofton – 8 tackles, 2 assists

Coming off their divisional win over the Buccaneers, the Falcons stayed at home, donned their throwback uniforms, and played their Week 10 interconference duel with the Baltimore Ravens on Thursday night. After a scoreless first quarter, Atlanta delivered the opening punch in the second quarter as quarterback Matt Ryan found running back Jason Snelling on a 28-yard touchdown run, followed by a 28-yard field goal from kicker Matt Bryant.

The Falcons added onto their lead in the third quarter as a Brent Grimes interception set up Bryant booted a 51-yard field goal. The Ravens would answer with quarterback Joe Flacco completing a 5-yard touchdown pass to wide receiver Anquan Boldin. Atlanta struck back in the fourth quarter as Ryan found wide receiver Roddy White on a 4-yard touchdown pass. Baltimore took the lead as Flacco completed a 6-yard touchdown pass to wide receiver Derrick Mason, followed by a 9-yard touchdown pass to tight end Todd Heap, with 1:05 left. However, a 24-yard completion to Michael Jenkins and Ravens penalties set the Falcons up at the Ravens 33-yard line. Then, Ryan connected with White again on a 33-yard touchdown pass (with a failed two-point conversion) with 20 seconds left in the game, giving the Falcons a 26–21 lead. Flacco attempted a miracle win, but his last pass to T.J. Houshmendazeh was fumbled with 0:02 seconds left.

With the win, the Falcons improved to 7–2.

During halftime, Deion Sanders was inducted into the Falcons Ring of Honor.

=== Week 11: at St. Louis Rams ===
Week 11: Atlanta Falcons at St. Louis Rams – Game summary

| Quarter | 1 | 2 | 3 | 4 | Total |
|---|---|---|---|---|---|
| Falcons | 3 | 13 | 7 | 11 | 34 |
| Rams | 7 | 3 | 7 | 0 | 17 |

at Edward Jones Dome, St. Louis, Missouri

- Date: November 21
- Game time: 4:05 pm. EST
- Game weather: None (dome stadium)
- Game attendance: 53,005
- Referee: Walt Anderson
- TV announcers (Fox): Sam Rosen and Tim Ryan
- Recap

Game information

First quarter

- STL – Michael Hoomanawanui 25-yard pass from Sam Bradford (Josh Brown kick), Rams 7–0, Drive: 3 plays, 52 yards, 1:12.
- ATL – Matt Bryant 42-yard field goal, Rams 7–3, Drive: 12 plays, 56 yards, 6:39.

Second quarter

- STL – Josh Brown 53-yard field goal, Rams 10–3, Drive: 10 plays, 58 yards, 3:59.
- ATL – Brian Finneran 12-yard pass from Matt Ryan (Matt Bryant kick), Tied 10–10, Drive: 4 plays, 47 yards, 1:47.
- ATL – Matt Bryant 29-yard field goal, Falcons 13–10, Drive: 7 plays, 43 yards, 2:45.
- ATL – Matt Bryant 24-yard field goal, Falcons 16–10, Drive: 11 plays, 62 yards, 4:54.

Third quarter

- STL – Brandon Gibson 13-yard pass from Sam Bradford (Josh Brown kick), Rams 17–16, Drive: 3 plays, 37 yards, 1:24.
- ATL – Justin Peelle 2-yard pass from Matt Ryan (Matt Bryant kick), Falcons 23–17, Drive: 8 plays, 58 yards, 4:59.

Fourth quarter

- ATL – Matt Bryant 21-yard field goal, Falcons 26–17, Drive: 14 plays, 73 yards, 7:06.
- ATL – Michael Turner 39-yard run (Matt Ryan – Roddy White pass), Falcons 34–17, Drive: 3 plays, 45 yards, 0:29.

Top passers

- ATL – Matt Ryan – 26/39, 253 yards, 2 touchdowns
- STL – Sam Bradford – 27/42, 233 yards, 2 touchdowns, 1 interception

Top rushers

- ATL – Michael Turner – 28 rushes, 131 yards, 1 touchdown
- STL – Steven Jackson – 11 rushes, 54 yards

Top receivers

- ATL – Roddy White – 9 receptions, 83 yards
- STL – Danny Amendonla – 8 receptions, 63 yards

Top tacklers

- ATL – Curtis Lofton – 7 tackles, 1 assist
- STL – James Laurinaitis – 8 tackles, 3 assists

Hoping to increase their winning streak the Falcons flew to Edward Jones Dome for an NFC duel with the Rams. In the first quarter the Falcons trailed early after QB Sam Bradford completed a 25-yard TD pass to TE Michael Hoomanawanui. The Falcons replied with kicker Matt Bryant hitting a 42-yard field goal. Later, Rams kicker Josh Brown hit a 53-yard field goal; but they took the lead after Matt Ryan completed a 12-yard TD pass to WR Brian Finneran, followed by Bryant converting a 29 and a 24-yard field goal. The lead was narrowed when Bradford threw a 13-yard TD pass to WR Brandon Gibson, but the Falcons. increased their lead as Ryan threw a 2-yard TD pass to TE Justin Peelle. This was followed in the fourth quarter by Bryant nailing a 21-yard field goal, and with RB Michael Turner taking it in for a 39-yard TD run.

With the win, Atlanta improved to 8–2, increasing their NFC South lead.

=== Week 12: vs. Green Bay Packers ===
Week Twelve: Green Bay Packers at Atlanta Falcons — Game summary

| Quarter | 1 | 2 | 3 | 4 | Total |
|---|---|---|---|---|---|
| Packers | 3 | 0 | 7 | 7 | 17 |
| Falcons | 3 | 7 | 0 | 10 | 20 |

at Georgia Dome, Atlanta, Georgia

- Date: November 28
- Game time: 1:00 pm EST/12:00 pm CST
- Game weather: None (dome stadium)
- Game attendance: 68,204
- Referee: Pete Morelli
- TV announcers (FOX): Thom Brennaman, Brian Billick and Laura Okmin
- Recap

Game information

First quarter

- ATL – Matt Bryant 38 yd. FG (ATL 3–0)
- GB – Mason Crosby 22 yd. FG (3–3)

Second quarter

- ATL – Tony Gonzalez 4 yd. TD reception from Matt Ryan, M. Bryant XP good (ATL 10–3)

Third quarter

- GB – Aaron Rodgers 1 yd. TD run, M. Crosby XP good (10–10)

Fourth quarter

- ATL – Michael Turner 1 yd. TD run, M. Bryant XP good (ATL 17–10)
- GB – Jordy Nelson 10 yd. TD reception from Aaron Rodgers, M. Crosby XP good (17–17)
- ATL – Matt Bryant 47 yd. FG (ATL 20–17)

Top passers

- GB – Aaron Rodgers – 26/35, 344 yds, TD
- ATL – Matt Ryan – 24/28, 197 yds, TD

Top rushers

- GB – Aaron Rodgers – 12 carries, 51 yards
- ATL – Michael Turner – 23 carries, 110 yards

Top receivers

- GB – Greg Jennings – 5 receptions, 119 yards
- ATL – Tony Gonzalez – 6 receptions, 51 yards, TD

Top tacklers

- GB – Charlie Peprah – 7 tackles, 2 assists
- ATL – Brent Grimes – 6 tackles

The Falcons' eleventh game was an NFC duel with the Packers inside their dome. In the first quarter the Falcons took the lead as kicker Matt Bryant nailed a 38-yard field goal. The Packers replied as kicker Mason Crosby hit a 22-yard field goal. The Falcons had the only score of the second quarter with QB Matt Ryan firing a 4-yard TD pass to TE Tony Gonzalez with 0:08 seconds left in the half. On the play before the drive began, on a 4th-and-Goal at the 1-yard line, Aaron Rodgers fumbled with the Falcons recovering. The Packers responded in the third quarter when QB Aaron Rodgers scrambled 1 yard for a touchdown. Less than a minute into the 4th quarter, the Falcons got the lead back as RB Michael Turner punched it in from 1 yard out. However, the Packers replied with Rodgers' 10-yard TD pass to WR Jordy Nelson on 4th-and-goal with 0:56 left. It was their third 4th down conversion on the drive. On the ensuing kick a 40-yard kickoff return by Eric Weems with a 15-yard facemask penalty set the Falcons up at the Packers 49-yard line. Four short completions set up Bryant's game-winning 47-yard field goal. The Packers called timeout before the kick, however, but, Bryant's second attempt was good with 0:09 seconds left. It was his third game-winning field goal of the season. Greg Jennings' lateral attempt went out of bounds on the next drive, and the game was over.

With the win, Atlanta improved to 9–2.

=== Week 13: at Tampa Bay Buccaneers ===
Week 13: Atlanta Falcons at Tampa Bay Buccaneers – Game summary

| Quarter | 1 | 2 | 3 | 4 | Total |
|---|---|---|---|---|---|
| Falcons | 7 | 7 | 0 | 14 | 28 |
| Buccaneers | 7 | 7 | 3 | 7 | 24 |

at Raymond James Stadium, Tampa, Florida

- Date: December 5
- Game time: 4:15 pm. EST
- Game weather: 72 °F (22 °C) (Sunny)
- Game attendance: 53,955
- Referee: Tony Corrente
- TV announcers (Fox): Dick Stockton, Charles Davis, Jim Mora & Laura Okmin
- Recap

Game information

First quarter

- ATL – Michael Turner 5-yard run (Matt Bryant kick), Falcons 7–0, Drive: 6 plays, 52 yards, 3:16.
- TB – LeGarrette Blount 6-yard run (Connor Barth kick), Tied 7–7, Drive: 11 plays, 86 yards, 5:58.

Second quarter

- ATL – Ovie Mughelli 17-yard pass from Matt Ryan (Matt Bryant kick), Falcons 14–7, Drive: 8 plays, 60 yards, 2:34.
- TB – Mike Williams 1-yard pass from Josh Freeman (Connor Barth kick), Tied 14–14, Drive: 7 plays, 30 yards, 1:24.

Third quarter

- TB – Connor Barth 33-yard field goal, Buccaneers 17–14, Drive: 8 plays, 51 yards, 3:26.

Fourth quarter

- TB – John Gilmore 2-yard pass from Earnest Graham (Connor Barth kick), Buccaneers 24–14, Drive: 4 plays, 39 yards, 2:00.
- ATL – Eric Weems 102-yard kickoff return (Matt Bryant kick), Buccaneers 24–21, Drive: 0 plays, 0 yards, 0:21.
- ATL – Michael Jenkins 9-yard pass from Matt Ryan (Matt Bryant kick), Falcons 28–24, Drive: 10 plays, 67 yards, 3:59.

Top passers

- ATL – Matt Ryan – 18/36, 205 yards, 2 touchdowns, 2 interceptions
- TB – Josh Freeman – 19/38, 181 yards, 1 touchdown, 1 interception

Top rushers

- ATL – Michael Turner – 24 rushes, 88 yards, 1 touchdown
- TB – LeGarrette Blount – 20 rushes, 103 yards, 1 touchdown

Top receivers

- ATL – Roddy White – 7 receptions, 74 yards
- TB – Mike Williams – 6 receptions, 68 yards, 1 touchdown

Top tacklers

- ATL – Curtis Lofton – 7 tackles, 2 assists
- TB – E.J. Biggers, Quincy Black – 7 tackles

Hoping to increase their winning streak the Falcons flew to Raymond James Stadium for an NFC South rivalry match against the Buccaneers. The Falcons took the early lead as RB Michael Turner got a 5-yard TD run. But the Buccaneers replied with RB LeGarrette Blount getting a 6-yard TD run. The Falcons scored again with QB Matt Ryan getting a 17-yard TD pass to FB Ovie Mughelli, but Tampa Bay replied with QB Josh Freeman getting a 1-yard TD pass to WR Mike Williams. The Falcons trailed for the first time in the game with kicker Connor Barth nailing a 33-yard field goal, and with Earnest Graham making a 2-yard TD pass to TE John Gilmore. The Falcons responded with Eric Weems returning a kickoff 102 yards for a touchdown, and getting the lead back with Ryan getting a 9-yard TD pass to WR Michael Jenkins.

With the win, the Falcons improved to 10–2.

=== Week 14: at Carolina Panthers ===
Week 14: Atlanta Falcons at Carolina Panthers – Game summary

| Quarter | 1 | 2 | 3 | 4 | Total |
|---|---|---|---|---|---|
| Falcons | 14 | 3 | 7 | 7 | 31 |
| Panthers | 0 | 0 | 7 | 3 | 10 |

at Bank of America Stadium, Charlotte, North Carolina

- Date: December 12
- Game time: 1:00 pm. EST
- Game weather: 44 °F (7 °C) (Cloudy)
- Game attendance: 71,235
- Referee: Clete Blakeman
- TV announcers (Fox): Ron Pitts and John Lynch
- Recap

Game information

First quarter

- ATL – Tony Gonzalez 4-yard pass from Matt Ryan (Matt Bryant kick), Falcons 7–0, Drive: 3 plays, 29 yards, 1:03.
- ATL – Michael Turner 1-yard run (Matt Bryant kick), Falcons 14–0, Drive: 8 plays, 73 yards, 4:40.

Second quarter

- ATL – Matt Bryant 39-yard field goal, Falcons 17–0, Drive: 18 plays, 64 yards, 8:48.

Third quarter

- CAR – Mike Goodson 13-yard run (John Kasay kick), Falcons 17–7, Drive: 5 plays, 81 yards, 2:21.
- ATL – Michael Turner 3-yard run (Matt Bryant kick), Falcons 24–7, Drive: 5 plays, 49 yards, 1:37.

Fourth quarter

- CAR – John Kasay 36-yard field goal, Falcons 24–10, Drive: 7 plays, 52 yards, 3:01.
- ATL – Michael Turner 4-yard run (Matt Bryant kick), Falcons 31–10, Drive: 4 plays, 16 yards, 1:52.

Top passers

- ATL – Matt Ryan – 20/34, 227 yards, 1 touchdown, 1 interception
- CAR – Jimmy Clausen – 14/24, 107 yards, 1 interception

Top rushers

- ATL – Michael Turner – 28 rushes, 112 yards, 3 touchdowns
- CAR – Jonathan Stewart – 18 rushes, 133 yards

Top receivers

- ATL – Roddy White – 8 receptions, 79 yards
- CAR – Brandon LaFell – 6 receptions, 38 yards

Top tacklers

- ATL – Thomas DeCoud – 6 tackles, 3 assists
- CAR – Jon Beason – 8 tackles

The Falcons' thirteenth game was an NFC South rivalry match against the Panthers. The Falcons commanded the first half as QB Matt Ryan completed a 4-yard TD pass to TE Tony Gonzalez, followed by RB Michael Turner getting a 1-yard TD run, and then with kicker Matt Bryant nailing a 39-yard field goal. The Panthers scored in the third quarter with RB Mike Goodson getting a 13-yard TD run, but the Falcons replied as Turner got a 3-yard TD run. The lead was narrowed as kicker John Kasay made a 36-yard field goal, but Atlanta pulled away as Turner got a 4-yard TD run.

With the win, Atlanta improved to 11–2.

=== Week 15: at Seattle Seahawks ===
Week 15: Atlanta Falcons at Seattle Seahawks – Game summary

| Quarter | 1 | 2 | 3 | 4 | Total |
|---|---|---|---|---|---|
| Falcons | 0 | 17 | 17 | 0 | 34 |
| Seahawks | 7 | 3 | 0 | 8 | 18 |

at Qwest Field, Seattle, Washington

- Date: December 19
- Game time: 4:05 pm. EST
- Game weather: 45 °F (7 °C) (Sunny)
- Game attendance: 67,101
- Referee: Walt Coleman
- TV announcers (Fox): Sam Rosen and Tim Ryan
- Recap

Game information

First quarter

- SEA – Marshawn Lynch 1-yard run (Olindo Mare kick), Seahawks 7–0, Drive: 12 plays, 80 yards, 7:32.

Second quarter

- ATL – Jason Snelling 3-yard pass from Matt Ryan (Matt Bryant kick), Tied 7–7, Drive: 15 plays, 51 yards, 8:14.
- ATL – Matt Bryant 27-yard field goal, Falcons 10–7, Drive: 14 plays, 51 yards, 7:16.
- SEA – Olindo Mare 38-yard field goal, Tied 10–10, Drive: 4 plays, 7 yards, 1:55.
- ATL – Michael Jenkins 24-yard pass from Matt Ryan (Matt Bryant kick), Falcons 17–10, Drive: 13 plays, 80 yards, 1:46.

Third quarter

- ATL – Jonathan Babineaux fumble recovery in end zone (Matt Bryant kick), Falcons 24–10.
- ATL – Matt Bryant 25-yard field goal, Falcons 27–10, Drive: 8 plays, 30 yards, 4:05.
- ATL – Roddy White 5-yard pass from Matt Ryan (Matt Bryant kick), Falcons 34–10, Drive: 4 plays, 21 yards, 2:20.

Fourth quarter

- SEA – Charlie Whitehurst 1-yard run (Charlie Whitehurst – Ben Obomanu pass), Falcons 34–18, Drive: 11 plays, 88 yards, 4:40.

Top passers

- ATL – Matt Ryan – 20/35, 174 yards, 3 touchdowns, 1 interception
- SEA – Charlie Whitehurst – 8/16, 83 yards

Top rushers

- ATL – Michael Turner – 25 rushes, 82 yards
- SEA – Marshawn Lynch – 12 rushes, 60 yards, 1 touchdown

Top receivers

- ATL – Roddy White – 7 receptions, 65 yards, 1 touchdown
- SEA – Mike Williams – 8 receptions, 66 yards

Top tacklers

- ATL – Curtis Lofton – 4 tackles, 3 assists
- SEA – Aaron Curry – 6 tackles, 1 assist

Looking to secure a playoff berth, the Falcons traveled to Seattle in their last regular-season road game to take on the Seahawks. Seattle took an early lead with a 1-yard TD run by Marshawn Lynch. Atlanta would later respond early in the second quarter with a Matt Ryan 3-yard TD pass to Jason Snelling, with Matt Bryant later adding a 27-yard field goal to take the lead. Seattle tied the game with a 38-yard field goal from Olindo Mare; however, the Falcons took the lead again with a Ryan 24-yard TD pass to Michael Jenkins to close the first half. On the Seahawks' first offensive possession of the second half, Matt Hasselbeck fumbled the football in the end-zone with defensive tackle Jonathan Babineaux recovering for a Falcons' touchdown. Atlanta would later add to their lead with a 25-yard Bryant field goal as well as a Ryan 24-yard TD pass to Roddy White. Seattle's only score of the second half came from backup quarterback Charlie Whitehurst with a 1-yard TD rush followed by a successful 2-point conversion with a Whitehurst pass to Ben Obomanu.

With the win, Atlanta improved to 12–2. Also, the Falcons secured a playoff berth early in the game due to Philadelphia's victory over the New York Giants.

=== Week 16: vs. New Orleans Saints ===
Week 16: New Orleans Saints at Atlanta Falcons – Game summary

| Quarter | 1 | 2 | 3 | 4 | Total |
|---|---|---|---|---|---|
| Saints | 3 | 7 | 0 | 7 | 17 |
| Falcons | 0 | 7 | 0 | 7 | 14 |

at Georgia Dome, Atlanta, Georgia

- Date: December 27
- Game time: 8:30 pm. EST
- Game weather: None (dome stadium)
- Game attendance: 70,144
- Referee: Ed Hochuli
- TV announcers (ESPN): Mike Tirico, Ron Jaworski, Jon Gruden, Michele Tafoya and Suzy Kolber
- Recap

Game information

First quarter

- NO – Garrett Hartley 52-yard field goal, Saints 3–0, Drive: 8 plays, 37 yards, 4:19.

Second quarter

- NO – Pierre Thomas 2-yard run (Garrett Hartley kick), Saints 10–0, Drive: 5 plays, 34 yards, 2:20.
- ATL – Roddy White 7-yard pass from Matt Ryan (Matt Bryant kick), Saints 10–7, Drive: 8 plays, 78 yards, 3:50.

Third quarter

- No scoring plays

Fourth quarter

- ATL – Chauncey Davis 26-yard interception return (Matt Bryant kick), Falcons 14–10.
- NO – Jimmy Graham 6-yard pass from Drew Brees (Garrett Hartley kick), Saints 17–14, Drive: 13 plays, 90 yards, 7:11.

Top passers

- NO – Drew Brees – 35/49, 302 yards, 1 touchdown, 2 interceptions
- ATL – Matt Ryan – 15/29, 148 yards, 1 touchdown

Top rushers

- NO – Pierre Thomas – 19 rushes, 63 yards, 1 touchdown
- ATL – Michael Turner – 17 rushes, 48 yards

Top receivers

- NO – Robert Meachem – 10 receptions, 101 yards
- ATL – Roddy White – 3 receptions, 43 yards, 1 touchdown

Top tacklers

- NO – Jo-Lonn Dunbar – 5 tackles, 1 assist
- ATL – Curtis Lofton – 6 tackles, 5 assists

Looking to win their division and capture the top seed in the NFC playoffs, the Falcons hosted the Saints in a Monday Night rematch of their Week 3 contest. New Orleans would score first with Garrett Hartley kicking a FG from 52 yards late in the first quarter. RB Pierre Thomas would add to the Saints' lead with a 2-yard TD run; however, Atlanta would respond with a Matt Ryan 7-yard TD pass to Roddy White to cut the lead to three. After a scoreless third quarter, the Falcons took the lead with Chauncey Davis returning an interception 26 yards for a touchdown. New Orleans reclaimed the lead late in the 4th with a Drew Brees 6-yard TD pass to Jimmy Graham. Atlanta attempted to come back; however, New Orleans held on for the win.

With the loss, Atlanta falls to 12–3, snapping their 8-game winning streak.

=== Week 17: vs. Carolina Panthers ===
Week 17: Carolina Panthers at Atlanta Falcons – Game summary

| Quarter | 1 | 2 | 3 | 4 | Total |
|---|---|---|---|---|---|
| Panthers | 0 | 0 | 3 | 7 | 10 |
| Falcons | 14 | 7 | 10 | 0 | 31 |

at Georgia Dome, Atlanta, Georgia

- Date: January 2
- Game time: 1:00 pm. EST
- Game weather: None (dome stadium)
- Referee: John Parry
- TV announcers (Fox): Dick Stockton and Charles Davis

Game information

First quarter Second quarter Third quarter Fourth quarter

Top passers

- CAR –
- ATL –

Top rushers

- CAR –
- ATL –

Top receivers

- CAR –
- ATL –

Top tacklers

- CAR –
- ATL –

The Falcons' sixteenth game was a division rivalry rematch against the Panthers inside their dome. The Falcons commanded the first half as QB Matt Ryan got a 6-yard TD pass to TE Tony Gonzalez. This was followed by a 55-yard punt return for a touchdown by Eric Weems; then with Ryan completing a 14-yard TD pass to WR Roddy White. The Panthers tried to cut the lead with kicker John Kasay getting a 23-yard field goal, but the Falcons continued to score as kicker Matt Bryant made a 47-yard field goal, followed by RB Michael Turner getting a 3-yard TD run. The lead was narrowed as QB Jimmy Clausen connected to TE Jeff King on a 2-yard TD pass, but the Falcons held on for the easy win, finishing their regular season on a 13–3 record. The Falcons swept the Panthers for the 1st time since 2004.

== Postseason results ==
=== Postseason ===
| Round | Date | Opponent (seed) | Result | Record | Venue | Recap |
|---|---|---|---|---|---|---|
| Divisional | January 15 | Green Bay Packers (6) | L 21–48 | 0–1 | Georgia Dome | Recap |

=== NFC Divisional Round: vs. (6) Green Bay Packers ===
NFC Divisional Round: (6) Green Bay Packers at (1) Atlanta Falcons – Game summary

| Quarter | 1 | 2 | 3 | 4 | Total |
|---|---|---|---|---|---|
| Packers | 0 | 28 | 14 | 6 | 48 |
| Falcons | 7 | 7 | 0 | 7 | 21 |

at Georgia Dome, Atlanta, Georgia

- Date: January 15
- Game time: 8:00 pm. EST
- Game weather: None (Dome Stadium)
- Game attendance: 69,210
- Referee: John Parry
- TV announcers (FOX): Joe Buck, Troy Aikman, Pam Oliver & Chris Myers
- Recap, Gamebook

Game information

First quarter

- ATL – Michael Turner 12-yard run (Matt Bryant kick), Falcons 7–0, Drive: 7 plays, 48 yards, 3:55.

Second quarter

- GB – Jordy Nelson 6-yard pass from Aaron Rodgers (Mason Crosby kick), Tied 7–7, Drive: 13 plays, 81 yards, 7:56
- ATL – Eric Weems 102-yard kickoff return (Matt Bryant kick), Falcons 14–7, Drive: 0 plays, 0 yards, 0:14.
- GB – John Kuhn 1-yard run (Mason Crosby kick), Tied 14–14, Drive: 10 plays, 92 yards, 5:44.
- GB – James Jones 20-yard pass from Aaron Rodgers (Mason Crosby kick), Packers 21–14, Drive: 7 plays, 80 yards, 1:38
- GB – Tramon Williams 70-yard interception return (Mason Crosby kick), Packers 28–14

Third quarter

- GB – Aaron Rodgers 7-yard run (Mason Crosby kick), Packers 35–14, Drive: 12 plays, 80 yards, 6:32.

Fourth quarter

- GB – John Kuhn 7-yard pass from Aaron Rodgers (Mason Crosby kick), Packers 42–14, Drive: 8 plays, 50 yards, 4:48
- ATL – Roddy White 6-yard pass from Matt Ryan (Matt Bryant kick), Packers 42–21, Drive: 7 plays, 73 yards, 3:20
- GB – Mason Crosby 43-yard field goal, Packers 45–21, Drive: 8 plays, 19 yards, 5:10.

Top passers

- GB – Aaron Rodgers – 31/36, 366 yards, 3 touchdowns
- ATL – Matt Ryan – 20/29, 186 yards, 1 touchdown, 2 interceptions

Top rushers

- GB – James Starks – 25 rushes, 66 yards
- ATL – Michael Turner – 10 rushes, 39 yards, 1 touchdown

Top receivers

- GB – Greg Jennings – 8 receptions, 101 yards
- ATL – Michael Jenkins – 6 receptions, 67 yards

Top tacklers

- GB – Charles Woodson – 5 tackles, 1 assist
- ATL – Brent Grimes – 7 tackles

Entering the postseason as the NFC's #1 seed, the Falcons began their playoff run at home against the #6 Green Bay Packers, in a rematch of their Week 12 match-up. Atlanta delivered the game's opening strike in the first quarter with a 12-yard touchdown run from running back Michael Turner. The Packers answered in the second quarter as quarterback Aaron Rodgers completed a 6-yard touchdown pass to wide receiver Jordy Nelson, yet the Falcons immediately struck back as wide receiver Eric Weems returned the ensuing kickoff for a franchise postseason best 102 yards for a touchdown. Green Bay came right back with fullback John Kuhn getting a 1-yard touchdown run, Rodgers completing a 20-yard touchdown pass to wide receiver James Jones, and cornerback Tramon Williams returning an interception 70 yards for a touchdown.

The Packers added onto their lead in the third quarter as Rodgers got a 7-yard touchdown run, followed by his 7-yard touchdown pass to Kuhn. Atlanta tried to rally in the fourth quarter as quarterback Matt Ryan found wide receiver Roddy White on a 6-yard touchdown pass, yet Green Bay closed out their dominating night with Crosby getting a 43-yard field goal.

With the loss, the Falcons' season came to a disappointing end with an overall record of 13–4.

The 27-point loss was the worst loss by a top seed in Divisional Playoff game history. It was the second worst defeat by a top seed before a Super Bowl, with the worst being a 28–0 loss by the Los Angeles Rams to the Dallas Cowboys in the 1978 season.
