= Brian Finneran =

American football player (born 1976)

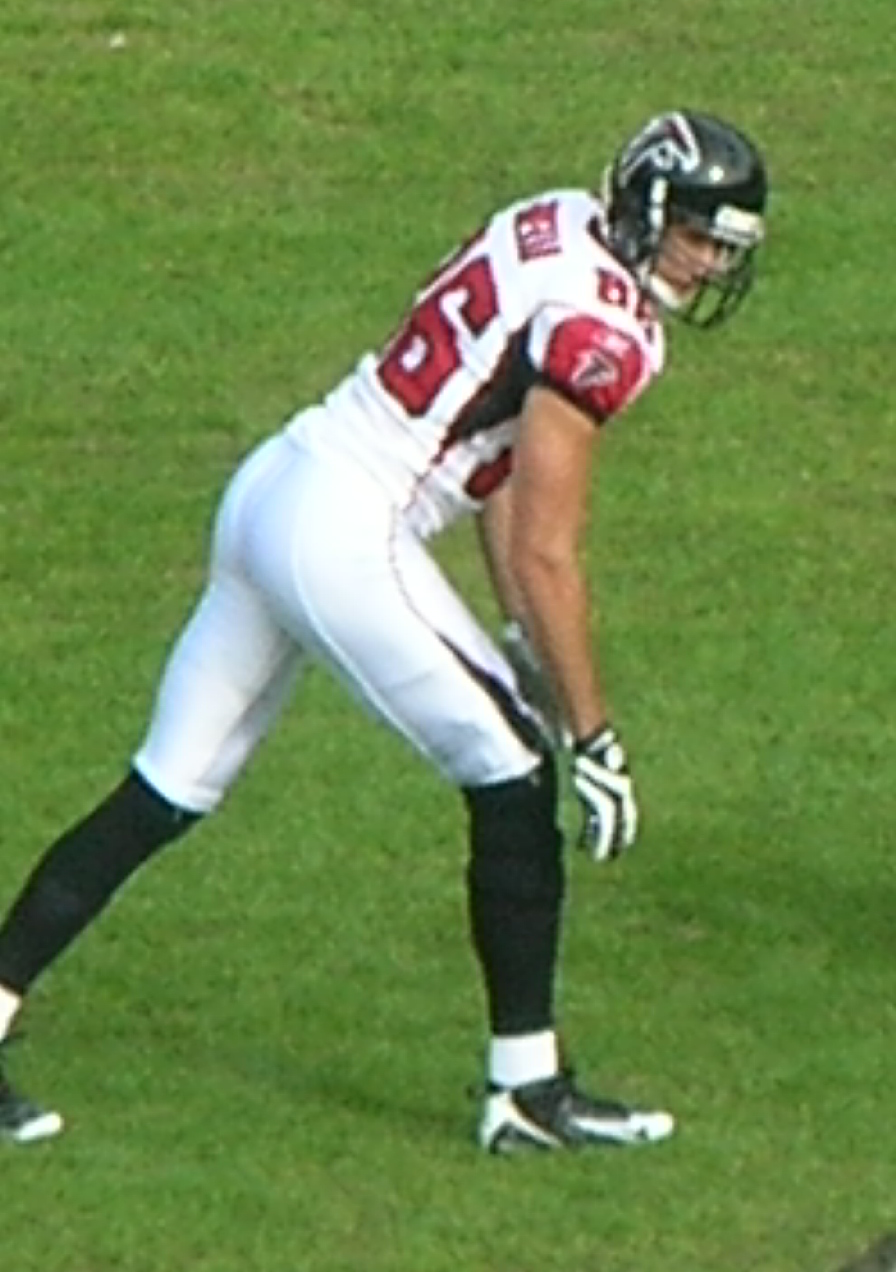
- Finneran with the Atlanta Falcons in 2008

No. 81, 86
- Position: Wide receiver

Personal information
- Born: January 31, 1976 (age 50); Mission Viejo, California, U.S.
- Listed height: 6 ft 5 in (1.96 m)
- Listed weight: 210 lb (95 kg)

Career information
- High school: Santa Margarita Catholic (Rancho Santa Margarita, California)
- College: Villanova (1994–1997)
- NFL draft: 1998: undrafted

Career history
- Seattle Seahawks (1998)*; Barcelona Dragons (1999); Philadelphia Eagles (1999); Atlanta Falcons (1999–2010)
- * Offseason or practice squad member only

Awards and highlights
- Walter Payton Award (1997); Villanova Wildcats No. 25 retired

Career NFL statistics
- Receptions: 238
- Receiving yards: 3,093
- Receiving touchdowns: 19
- Stats at Pro Football Reference

Brian Joseph Finneran (born January 31, 1976) is an American former professional football player who was a wide receiver in the National Football League (NFL). He was signed by the Seattle Seahawks as an undrafted free agent in 1998 and also played for the Barcelona Dragons, Philadelphia Eagles, and Atlanta Falcons. He played college football for the Villanova Wildcats.

== Early life ==
Finneran attended Santa Margarita Catholic High School in Rancho Santa Margarita, California, and finished his three-year career there with a school career-record 177 receptions. Finneran received scholarship offers to play college football for the Oregon Ducks and Oregon State Beavers. However, the only school to offer a football scholarship to both Finneran and his twin brother was Villanova.

== College career ==
Finneran and his identical twin brother, Brad, played college football for Villanova University and were lettermen. As a senior, Finneran had 96 receptions for 1,389 yards, earning All-American honors from the Associated Press and being awarded the Walter Payton Award, which is given to the nation's top Division I-AA offensive player. He had 265 receptions for 3,872 yards and 34 touchdowns over his entire college career. He had his number 25 jersey retired by Villanova in the fall of 2003.

== Professional career ==
Prior to joining the Falcons, Finneran played for the NFL Europa Barcelona Dragons where he was named All-NFL Europe. After coming to America and joining the Falcons, he proved to be a consistent possession receiver. Finneran tore ligaments in his left knee during Falcons practice on July 30, 2006, and missed the entire 2006 season. He missed his second straight season after tearing the reconstructed anterior cruciate ligament in his left knee. Before injuries forced him to miss the previous two seasons, he was the preferred target of quarterback Michael Vick despite generally starting in the slot receiver position. He returned to the field in 2008 but did not start and saw limited action. He was re-signed to a one-year contract on February 11, 2010.

== NFL career statistics ==
Legend
**Bold**	Career high

=== Regular season ===
Year	Team	Games		Receiving				
Year	Team	GP	GS	Rec	Yds	Avg	Lng	TD
1999	PHI	3	0	2	21	10.5	11	0
2000	ATL	12	0	7	60	8.6	14	0
2001	ATL	16	1	23	491	**21.3**	52	3
2002	ATL	16	16	**56**	**838**	15.0	47	**6**
2003	ATL	12	10	26	368	14.2	38	2
2004	ATL	12	1	23	258	11.2	26	2
2005	ATL	16	7	50	611	12.2	**53**	2
2008	ATL	16	0	21	169	8.0	14	1
2009	ATL	10	2	11	111	10.1	19	0
2010	ATL	16	1	19	166	8.7	21	3
		129	38	238	3,093	13.0	53	19

=== Playoffs ===
Year	Team	Games		Receiving				
Year	Team	GP	GS	Rec	Yds	Avg	Lng	TD
2002	ATL	2	2	**9**	**107**	11.9	28	0
2004	ATL	2	0	3	37	**12.3**	**29**	0
2008	ATL	1	0	2	11	5.5	7	0
2010	ATL	1	0	4	47	11.8	19	0
		6	2	18	202	11.2	29	0

== Personal life ==
He is one of the four hosts on The Locker Room, a morning sports talk show on WCNN 680 The Fan in Atlanta. He is also currently an ambassador for USA Football.
