= Corey Peters =

American football player (born 1988)

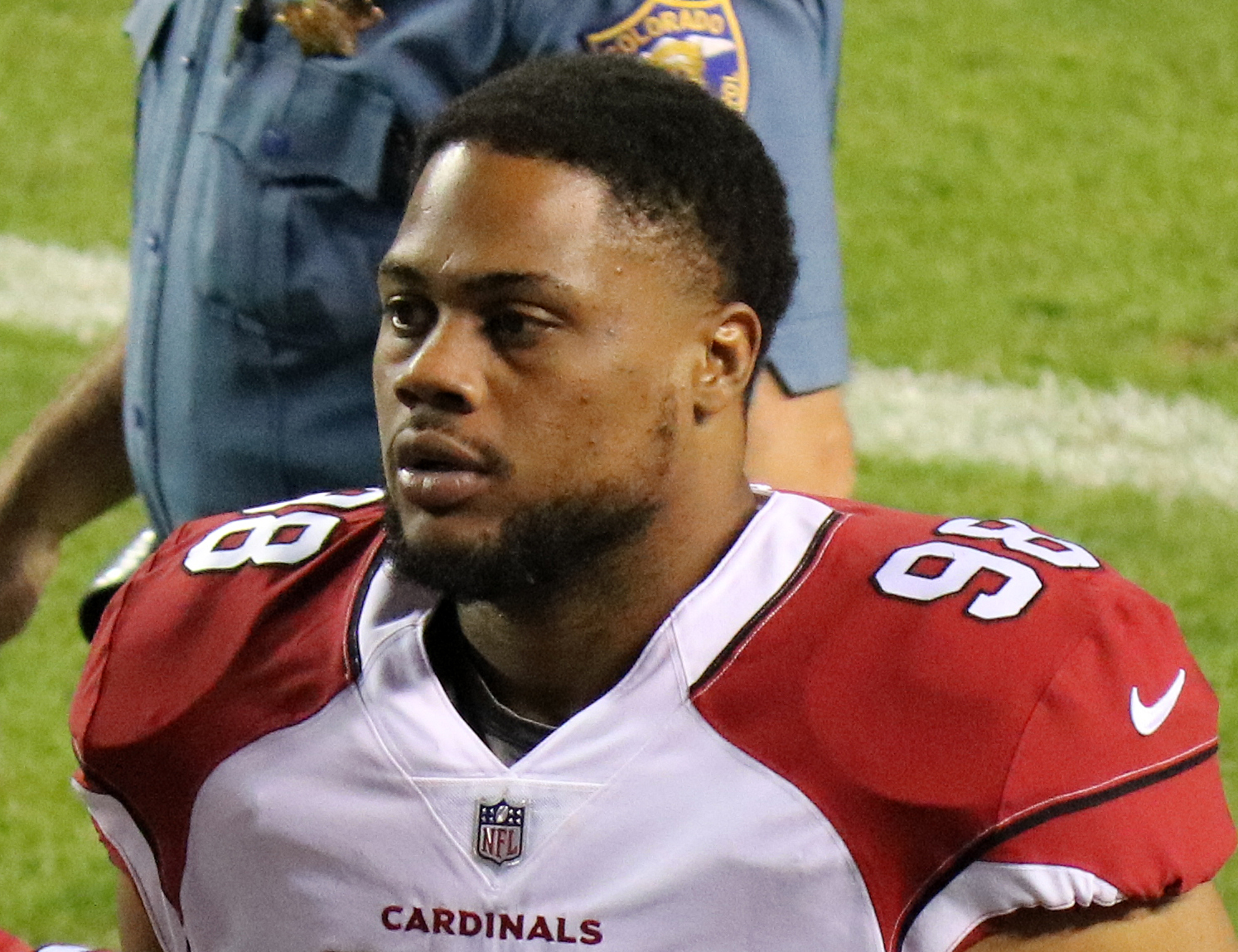
- Peters with the Arizona Cardinals in 2017

No. 91, 98
- Position: Nose tackle

Personal information
- Born: June 8, 1988 (age 38); Pittsburgh, Pennsylvania, U.S.
- Listed height: 6 ft 3 in (1.91 m)
- Listed weight: 335 lb (152 kg)

Career information
- High school: Central (Louisville, Kentucky)
- College: Kentucky (2006–2009)
- NFL draft: 2010: 3rd round, 83rd overall pick

Career history
- As player: Atlanta Falcons (2010–2014); Arizona Cardinals (2015–2021); Jacksonville Jaguars (2022); As staff member / executive: Jacksonville Jaguars (2024–present)

Awards and highlights
- First-team All-SEC (2009)

Career NFL statistics
- Total tackles: 336
- Sacks: 19
- Forced fumbles: 1
- Fumble recoveries: 3
- Interceptions: 1
- Defensive touchdowns: 1
- Stats at Pro Football Reference

Corey Peters (born June 8, 1988) is an American former professional football player who was a nose tackle in the National Football League (NFL). He played college football for the Kentucky Wildcats. He was selected by the Atlanta Falcons in the third round of the 2010 NFL draft, and also spent time with the Arizona Cardinals and Jacksonville Jaguars.

== Early life ==
Peters played high school football for Louisville Central High School, where he was first-team all state.

== College career ==
Peters played college football for the Kentucky Wildcats. He started two games as a freshman and started 12 games as a sophomore. As a junior, he tallied 36 tackles, 10 tackles for loss and four quarterback sacks. As a senior Peters had four sacks and twelve tackles for losses. Peters was also named second-team All-SEC as a senior.

== Professional career ==
Pre-draft measurables
Height	Weight	Arm length	Hand span	40-yard dash	10-yard split	20-yard split	20-yard shuttle	Three-cone drill	Vertical jump	Broad jump	Bench press
6 ft 3 1/4 in (1.91 m)	300 lb (136 kg)	34 in (0.86 m)	9 in (0.23 m)	4.90 s	1.68 s	2.83 s	4.49 s	7.31 s	33 in (0.84 m)	8 ft 7 in (2.62 m)	26 reps
All values from NFL Combine and Pro Day

=== Atlanta Falcons ===
Peters was selected by the Atlanta Falcons in the third round, 83rd overall, of the 2010 NFL draft. The Atlanta Falcons signed Corey Peters to a four-year deal on June 8, 2010.

On March 4, 2014, Peters and the Falcons agreed on a one-year deal that kept him in Atlanta throughout the 2014 season.

=== Arizona Cardinals ===
On March 10, 2015, Peters signed a three-year deal with the Arizona Cardinals. He tore his left Achilles tendon on August 20, during practice, and was placed on injured reserve the next day.

On December 1, 2017, Peters signed a three-year contract extension with the Cardinals.

In 2018, Peters started 15 games, recording a career-high 51 tackles and 2.5 sacks.

In Week 10 of the 2020 season, Peters suffered a season-ending knee injury and was placed on injured reserve on November 19, 2020.

On August 2, 2021, Peters signed a one-year deal with the Cardinals.

=== Jacksonville Jaguars ===
On September 12, 2022, Peters signed with the practice squad of the Jacksonville Jaguars. He was promoted to the active roster on October 12.

=== Retirement ===
Peters announced his retirement from the NFL after 13 seasons on April 6, 2023.

Peters was inducted into the Kentucky Pro Football Hall of Fame in 2019.

== NFL career statistics ==
Year	Team	GP	Tackles				Fumbles			Interceptions					
Year	Team	GP	Cmb	Solo	Ast	Sck	FF	FR	Yds	Int	Yds	Avg	Lng	TD	PD
2010	ATL	16	33	25	8	1.0	0	0	0	0	0	0	0	0	1
2011	ATL	15	26	21	5	3.0	0	1	13	1	1	1	1	0	3
2012	ATL	10	15	11	4	0.0	1	0	0	0	0	0	0	0	1
2013	ATL	15	46	29	17	5.0	0	0	0	0	0	0	0	0	2
2014	ATL	15	26	15	11	2.0	0	0	0	0	0	0	0	0	0
2015	ARI	0	Did not play due to injury												
2016	ARI	15	21	12	9	0.0	0	0	0	0	0	0	0	0	0
2017	ARI	12	22	18	4	1.0	0	0	0	0	0	0	0	0	1
2018	ARI	15	51	34	17	2.5	0	1	0	0	0	0	0	0	0
2019	ARI	16	38	19	19	2.5	0	0	0	0	0	0	0	0	0
2020	ARI	9	15	10	5	2.0	0	0	0	0	0	0	0	0	1
2021	ARI	14	24	10	14	0.0	0	1	4	0	0	0	0	0	1
2022	JAX	12	20	11	9	0.0	0	0	0	0	0	0	0	0	0
Career		164	336	214	122	19.0	1	3	17	1	1	1	1	0	10
