= Ovie Mughelli =

American football player (born 1980)

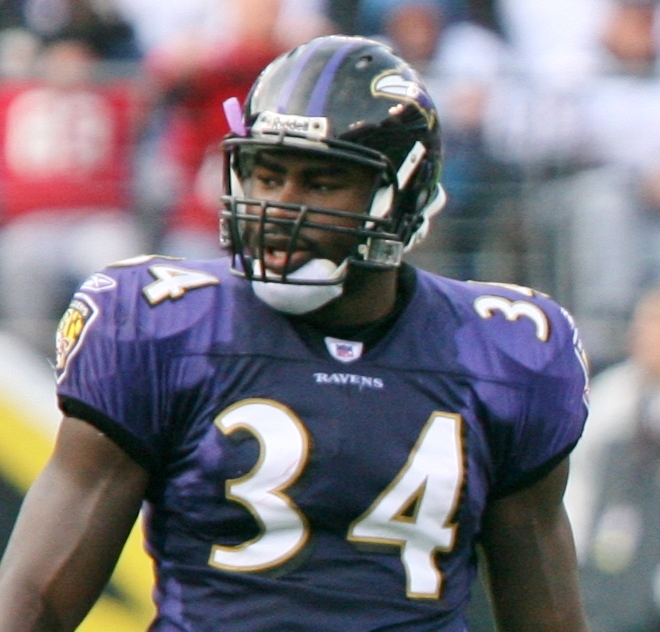
- Mughelli with the Baltimore Ravens in 2006

No. 34
- Position: Fullback

Personal information
- Born: June 10, 1980 (age 46); Charleston, South Carolina, U.S.
- Listed height: 6 ft 1 in (1.85 m)
- Listed weight: 250 lb (113 kg)

Career information
- High school: Porter-Gaud (Charleston)
- College: Wake Forest (1998–2002)
- NFL draft: 2003: 4th round, 134th overall pick

Career history
- Baltimore Ravens (2003–2006); Atlanta Falcons (2007–2011); St. Louis Rams (2012)*
- * Offseason or practice squad member only

Awards and highlights
- 2× Second-team All-Pro (2006, 2010); Pro Bowl (2010)

Career NFL statistics
- Rushing yards: 120
- Rushing average: 2.9
- Receptions: 62
- Receiving yards: 490
- Total touchdowns: 7
- Stats at Pro Football Reference

Ovie Phillip Mughelli (born June 10, 1980) is an American former professional football player who was a fullback for the Baltimore Ravens and Atlanta Falcons of the National Football League (NFL). After playing college football for the Wake Forest Demon Deacons, he was selected by the Ravens in the fourth round of the 2003 NFL draft.

== Early life ==
Mughelli attended Porter-Gaud School and a letterman in football, basketball, tennis, and track & field. In football, he rushed for more than 4,500 yards and scored 69 touchdowns during his career at Porter-Gaud, and he rushed for 2,167 yards and 29 touchdowns as a senior. He was named the team's MVP for three years, was a three-time All-Conference selection, and as a senior, he was also named the State Player of the Year in his classification and was a Regional All-Star selection in all division. He also led the team to a state title in 1996 and state runner-up honors during his senior year in 1997 to Laurence Manning Academy 32–30.

== College career ==
Mughelli attended Wake Forest University, where he was a letterman for the Wake Forest Demon Deacons football team. A fullback in college, Ovie was a first-team All-Atlantic Coast Conference (ACC) selection at that position. He started every game in his senior year as a Demon Deacon, coming in with the third highest rushing touchdown record in school history. He was rated the No. 1 fullback by USA Today.

== Professional career ==
Pre-draft measurables
Height	Weight	Arm length	Hand span	20-yard shuttle	Three-cone drill	Vertical jump	Broad jump
6 ft 1 in (1.85 m)	255 lb (116 kg)	32 in (0.81 m)	10 in (0.25 m)	4.32 s	7.78 s	31 1/2 in (0.80 m)	9 ft 6 in (2.90 m)
All values from NFL Combine.

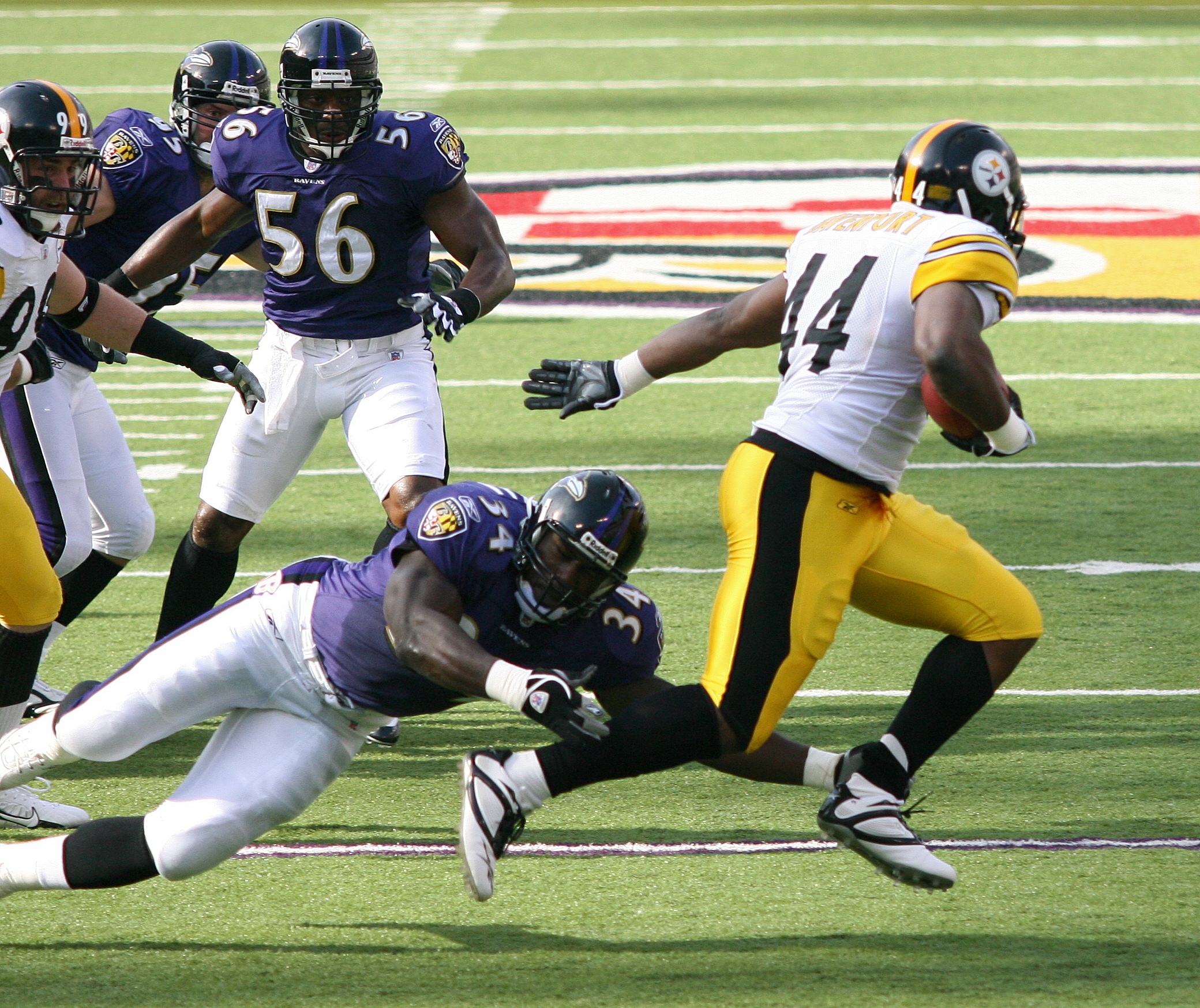
Mughelli (34), playing special teams and attempting to tackle Najeh Davenport of the Pittsburgh Steelers in 2006.

=== Baltimore Ravens ===
Mughelli was selected with the 134th overall pick (fourth round) of the 2003 NFL draft by the Baltimore Ravens; the choice was a compensatory pick. He was the second fullback selected in Baltimore's franchise history (the first was Steve Lee in the sixth round of the 1997 NFL draft); he was also the first ever Wake Forest player selected by the team.

It was during the 2006 season that Mughelli recorded his first ever NFL touchdown. He also went all-Pro for the first time in his career.

=== Atlanta Falcons ===
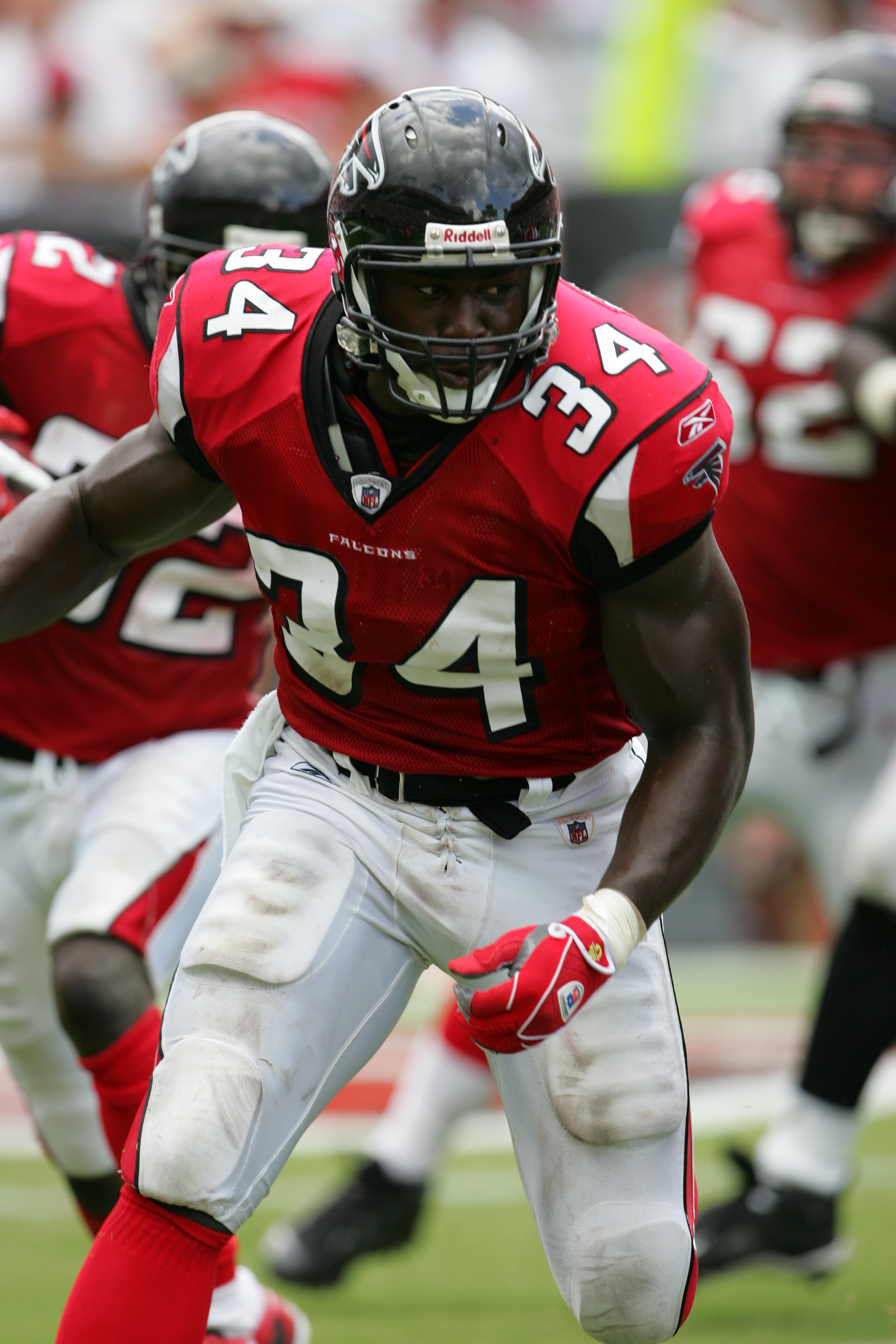
Mughelli with the Falcons in 2011

In 2007, Mughelli signed with the Atlanta Falcons to block for running backs Warrick Dunn and Jerious Norwood. On March 2, Mughelli signed a 6-year, $18 million contract with a $5 million signing bonus. The contract was the largest given to a fullback in NFL history at the time.

In 2010, Mughelli went all-Pro for the second time in his career, the first being in 2006, and was elected to his first ever Pro Bowl. He also recorded the fourth receiving touchdown of his career.

He was released by the Falcons on May 8, 2012.

=== St. Louis Rams ===
Mughelli signed a contract with the St. Louis Rams on July 28, 2012. He was released by the team on August 31, 2012.

== Post-playing career ==
In 2012, Mughelli joined WZGC "92.9 the Game" sports station in Atlanta as a host.

In 2014, Mughelli joined the all-digital sports network, 120 Sports as a host. 120 Sports launched on June 25, 2014.
