= 2011 Pro Bowl =

National Football League all-star game

2011 NFL Pro Bowl
| AFC | NFC |
|---|---|
| 41 | 55 |
| Head coach: Bill Belichick (New England Patriots) | Head coach: Mike Smith (Atlanta Falcons) |
| | 1 | 2 | 3 | 4 | Total |
|---|---|---|---|---|---|
| AFC | 0 | 7 | 21 | 13 | 41 |
| NFC | 14 | 28 | 3 | 10 | 55 |
- Date: January 30, 2011
- Stadium: Aloha Stadium; Honolulu, Hawaii
- MVP: DeAngelo Hall (Washington Redskins)
- Referee: Tony Corrente
- Attendance: 49,338

Ceremonies
- National anthem: Kris Allen

TV in the United States
- Network: Fox
- Announcers: Thom Brennaman, Brian Billick, Terry Bradshaw, Tony Siragusa, and Jay Glazer

The 2011 Pro Bowl was the National Football League's all-star game for the 2010 season. It took place at 7:00 p.m. EST (2:00 p.m. local time) on Sunday, January 30, 2011, at Aloha Stadium in Honolulu, Hawaii. The NFC won 55–41, despite leading 42–0.

== Return to Hawaii ==
In 2010, the NFL's contract with Hawaii's Aloha Stadium expired, and commissioner (Roger Goodell) reviewed several options of locations for the Pro Bowl. Eventually, it was decided that the 2010 Pro Bowl would be played at Sun Life Stadium in Miami, Florida where Super Bowl XLIV would be held. Goodell also decided the Pro Bowl would be played before Super Bowl XLIV after "looking at alternatives to strengthen the Pro Bowl."

Soon after Goodell made the decision to play the 2010 Pro Bowl in Miami, it was immediately criticized by coaches and players such as Eli Manning, who said, "if the tradition continues, eventually the game will be held in cities that are not desirable vacation destinations."

As a result of backlash from players and critics about the decision to move the 2010 Pro Bowl to Miami, and the state of Hawaii offering a US$4,000,000 subsidy to the league, the NFL moved the game back to Hawaii for 2011, but the game remained before the Super Bowl for the second straight season. Therefore, players on the teams participating in Super Bowl XLV, the Green Bay Packers and the Pittsburgh Steelers, did not play in the Pro Bowl the Sunday prior.

== Scoring summary ==
| Scoring Play | Score |
|---|---|
1st Quarter
| NFC – Ovie Mughelli 1 yd. run (David Akers kick) | NFC 7–0 |
| NFC – Adrian Peterson 14 yd. run (David Akers kick) | NFC 14–0 |
2nd Quarter
| NFC – Tony Gonzalez 4 yd. pass from Matt Ryan (David Akers kick) | NFC 21–0 |
| NFC – DeAngelo Hall 34 yd. fumble return (David Akers kick) | NFC 28–0 |
| NFC – Larry Fitzgerald 25 yd. pass from Matt Ryan (David Akers kick) | NFC 35–0 |
| NFC – Steven Jackson 21 yd. run (David Akers kick) | NFC 42–0 |
| AFC – Jamaal Charles 8 yd. run (Billy Cundiff kick) | NFC 42–7 |
3rd Quarter
| AFC – Reggie Wayne 16 yd. pass from Philip Rivers (Billy Cundiff kick) | NFC 42–14 |
| AFC – Montell Owens 8 yd. fumble return | NFC 42–21 |
| NFC – David Akers 41 yd. Field Goal | NFC 45–21 |
| AFC – Marcedes Lewis 28 yd. pass from Philip Rivers (Billy Cundiff kick) | NFC 45–28 |
4th Quarter
| NFC – David Akers 38 yd. Field Goal | NFC 48–28 |
| NFC – Jon Beason 49 yd. interception return (David Akers kick) | NFC 55–28 |
| AFC – Montell Owens 7 yd. pass from Matt Cassel (Billy Cundiff kick) | NFC 55–35 |
| AFC – Alex Mack 67 yd. pass play from Matt Cassel [21 yd. pass to Dwayne Bowe, lateral to Montell Owens (69 yds), lateral to Alex Mack (40yds)] (2-point conversion pass failed) | NFC 55–41 |

== AFC roster ==
=== Offense ===
| Position | Starter(s) | Reserve(s) | Alternate(s) |
|---|---|---|---|
| Quarterback | 12 Tom Brady, New England^{[b]} | 17 Philip Rivers, San Diego^{[c]} 18 Peyton Manning, Indianapolis Colts | 7 Matt Cassel, Kansas City^{[a]} |
| Running back | 32 Maurice Jones-Drew, Jacksonville^{[b]} | 23 Arian Foster, Houston^{[c]} 25 Jamaal Charles, Kansas City | 28 Chris Johnson, Tennessee^{[a]} |
| Fullback | 44 Vonta Leach, Houston | | |
| Wide receiver | 80 Andre Johnson, Houston^{[b]} 87 Reggie Wayne, Indianapolis | 84 Brandon Lloyd, Denver^{[c]} 82 Dwayne Bowe, Kansas City | 83 Wes Welker, New England^{[a]} |
| Tight end | 85 Antonio Gates, San Diego^{[b]} | 89 Marcedes Lewis, Jacksonville^{[c]} | 80 Zach Miller, Oakland^{[a]} |
| Offensive tackle | 77 Jake Long, Miami^{[b]} 73 Joe Thomas, Cleveland | 60 D'Brickashaw Ferguson, N.Y. Jets^{[c]} | 72 Matt Light, New England^{[a]} |
| Offensive guard | 68 Kris Dielman, San Diego; 70 Logan Mankins, New England | 54 Brian Waters, Kansas City | |
| Center | 74 Nick Mangold, N.Y. Jets^{[b]} | 53 Maurkice Pouncey, Pittsburgh^{[e]} | 63 Jeff Saturday, Indianapolis^{[a]}^{[c]} 55 Alex Mack, Cleveland^{[a]} |

=== Defense ===
| Position | Starter(s) | Reserve(s) | Alternate(s) |
|---|---|---|---|
| Defensive end | 93 Dwight Freeney, Indianapolis^{[b]} 98 Robert Mathis, Indianapolis | 93 Jason Babin, Tennessee^{[c]} | 99 Brett Keisel, Pittsburgh^{[a]}^{[e]} 94 Randy Starks, Miami^{[a]} |
| Defensive tackle | 92 Haloti Ngata, Baltimore; 75 Vince Wilfork, New England | 92 Richard Seymour, Oakland^{[b]} | 95 Kyle Williams, Buffalo^{[a]} |
| Outside linebacker | 92 James Harrison, Pittsburgh^{[e]} 91 Cameron Wake, Miami | 55 Terrell Suggs, Baltimore^{[c]} | 91 Tamba Hali, Kansas City^{[a]}^{[b]} 95 Shaun Phillips, San Diego^{[a]} |
| Inside linebacker | 52 Ray Lewis, Baltimore | 51 Jerod Mayo, New England | |
| Cornerback | 21 Nnamdi Asomugha, Oakland^{[b]} 24 Darrelle Revis, N.Y. Jets | 32 Devin McCourty, New England^{[c]} | 24 Champ Bailey, Denver^{[a]} |
| Free safety | 20 Ed Reed, Baltimore^{[b]} | 31 Brandon Meriweather, New England^{[c]} | |
| Strong safety | 43 Troy Polamalu, Pittsburgh^{[e]} | | 33 Michael Griffin, Tennessee^{[a]}^{[c]}^{[f]} 29 Eric Berry, Kansas City^{[a]} |

=== Special teams ===
| Position | Starter(s) | Reserve(s) | Alternate(s) |
|---|---|---|---|
| Punter | 9 Shane Lechler, Oakland | | |
| Placekicker | 7 Billy Cundiff, Baltimore | | |
| Kick returner | 83 Marc Mariani, Tennessee | | |
| Special teamer | 24 Montell Owens, Jacksonville | | |
| Long snapper | 92 John Denney, Miami^{[d]} | | |

== NFC roster ==
=== Offense ===
| Position | Starter(s) | Reserve(s) | Alternate(s) |
|---|---|---|---|
| Quarterback | **7 Michael Vick, Philadelphia** | **2 Matt Ryan, Atlanta**; **9 Drew Brees, New Orleans** | |
| Running back | **33 Michael Turner, Atlanta** | **28 Adrian Peterson, Minnesota**; **39 Steven Jackson, St. Louis** | |
| Fullback | **34 Ovie Mughelli, Atlanta** | | |
| Wide receiver | **84 Roddy White, Atlanta**; **81 Calvin Johnson, Detroit** | 10 DeSean Jackson, Philadelphia^{[b]} 85 Greg Jennings, Green Bay^{[e]} | 80 Donald Driver, Green Bay^{[a]}^{[e]} **11 Larry Fitzgerald, Arizona^{[a]}** **19 Miles Austin, Dallas^{[a]}** |
| Tight end | **82 Jason Witten, Dallas** | **88 Tony Gonzalez, Atlanta** | |
| Offensive tackle | 71 Jason Peters, Philadelphia^{[b]} **69 Jordan Gross, Carolina** | 76 Chad Clifton, Green Bay^{[e]} | **77 Tyson Clabo, Atlanta^{[a]}^{[c]}** **70 Donald Penn, Tampa Bay^{[a]}** |
| Offensive guard | **73 Jahri Evans, New Orleans**; **76 Chris Snee, N.Y. Giants** | **77 Carl Nicks, New Orleans** | |
| Center | **65 Andre Gurode, Dallas** | 60 Shaun O'Hara, N.Y. Giants^{[b]} | **67 Ryan Kalil, Carolina^{[a]}** |

=== Defense ===
| Position | Starter(s) | Reserve(s) | Alternate(s) |
|---|---|---|---|
| Defensive end | **90 Julius Peppers, Chicago**; **55 John Abraham, Atlanta** | **91 Justin Tuck, N.Y. Giants** | |
| Defensive tackle | 90 Ndamukong Suh, Detroit^{[b]} **90 Jay Ratliff, Dallas** | **94 Justin Smith, San Francisco^{[c]}** | 93 Kevin Williams, Minnesota^{[a]}^{[b]} **90 Darnell Dockett, Arizona^{[a]}** |
| Outside linebacker | 52 Clay Matthews, Green Bay^{[e]} **94 DeMarcus Ware, Dallas** | 55 Lance Briggs, Chicago^{[b]} | **98 Brian Orakpo, Washington^{[a]}^{[c]}** **52 Jon Beason, Carolina^{[a]}** |
| Inside linebacker | 52 Patrick Willis, San Francisco^{[b]} | 54 Brian Urlacher, Chicago^{[b]} | **51 Jonathan Vilma, New Orleans^{[a]}^{[c]}^{[g]}** **59 London Fletcher, Washington^{[a]}** 56 E. J. Henderson, Minnesota^{[a]}^{[g]} |
| Cornerback | 22 Asante Samuel, Philadelphia^{[b]} 21 Charles Woodson, Green Bay^{[e]} | **23 DeAngelo Hall, Washington^{[c]}** | 38 Tramon Williams, Green Bay^{[a]}^{[e]} **26 Antoine Winfield, Minnesota^{[a]}** **20 Brent Grimes, Atlanta^{[a]}^{[c]}** |
| Free safety | 36 Nick Collins, Green Bay^{[e]} | **26 Antrel Rolle, N.Y. Giants^{[c]}** | **41 Roman Harper, New Orleans^{[a]}** |
| Strong safety | **24 Adrian Wilson, Arizona** | | |

=== Special teams ===
| Position | Starter(s) | Reserve(s) | Alternate(s) |
|---|---|---|---|
| Punter | **1 Mat McBriar, Dallas** | | |
| Placekicker | **2 David Akers, Philadelphia** | | |
| Kick returner | **23 Devin Hester, Chicago** | | |
| Special teamer | **14 Eric Weems, Atlanta** | | |
| Long snapper | **51 Zak DeOssie, N.Y. Giants^{[d]}** | | |

Notes:

bold denotes player who participated in game
^{a} Replacement selection due to injury or vacancy
^{b} Injured player; selected but did not play
^{c} Replacement starter; selected as reserve
^{d} "Need player"; named by coach
^{e} Selected but did not play because his team advanced to Super Bowl XLV
^{f} Griffin was selected as free safety
^{g} Vilma originally backed out of the game and was replaced by Henderson who played instead of him, but Vilma later decided to play and Henderson was inactive

== Number of selections per team ==
| AFC team | Selections | NFC team | Selections |
|---|---|---|---|
| New England Patriots | 8 | Atlanta Falcons | 9 |
| Kansas City Chiefs | 6 | Green Bay Packers | 7 |
| Baltimore Ravens | 5 | Dallas Cowboys | 6 |
| Indianapolis Colts | 5 | New Orleans Saints | 5 |
| Miami Dolphins | 4 | New York Giants | 5 |
| Oakland Raiders | 4 | Philadelphia Eagles | 5 |
| Pittsburgh Steelers | 5 | Chicago Bears | 4 |
| San Diego Chargers | 4 | Minnesota Vikings | 4 |
| Tennessee Titans | 4 | Arizona Cardinals | 3 |
| Houston Texans | 3 | Carolina Panthers | 3 |
| Jacksonville Jaguars | 3 | Washington Redskins | 3 |
| New York Jets | 3 | Detroit Lions | 2 |
| Cleveland Browns | 2 | San Francisco 49ers | 2 |
| Denver Broncos | 2 | St. Louis Rams | 1 |
| Buffalo Bills | 1 | Tampa Bay Buccaneers | 1 |
| Cincinnati Bengals | 0 | Seattle Seahawks | 0 |
