= 2011 Tampa Bay Buccaneers season =

NFL team season

- Owner: Malcolm Glazer
- General manager: Mark Dominik
- Head coach: Raheem Morris
- Home stadium: Raymond James Stadium

Results
- Record: 4–12
- Division place: 4th NFC South
- Playoffs: Did not qualify
- Pro Bowlers: G Davin Joseph

Uniform
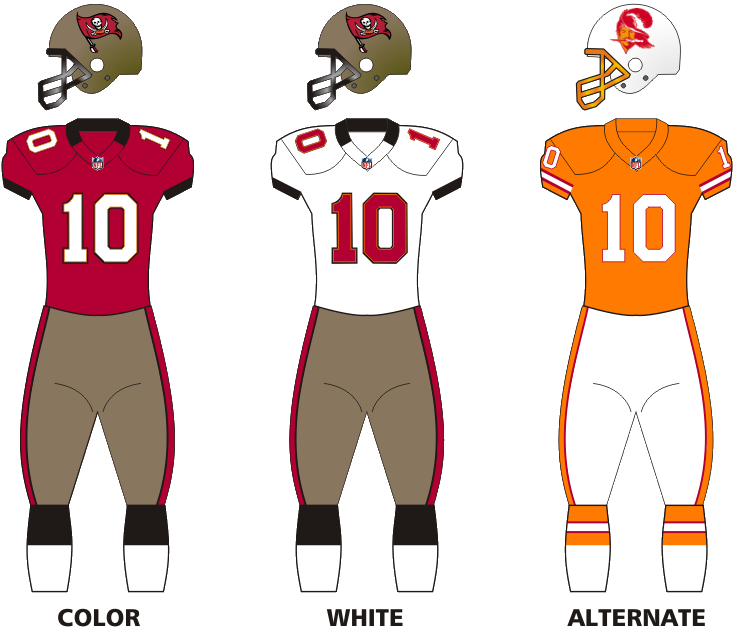

The 2011 season was the Tampa Bay Buccaneers' 36th in the National Football League (NFL), and their third and final season under head coach Raheem Morris. The team played seven of their home games at Raymond James Stadium in Tampa, Florida; the eighth was played at Wembley Stadium in London in week 7 as part of the NFL International Series.

Tampa Bay had high hopes for 2011. The team had not qualified for the playoffs since 2007, and that they attempted to build upon their success from the previous season. In 2010, Tampa Bay had finished with a 10–6 record, but lost out on tiebreakers and failed to make the playoffs. With the youngest head coach, and the youngest roster in terms of average age, in the league, and with anxious optimism, head coach Raheem Morris nicknamed the team "youngry." A close loss to the Detroit Lions on opening day was followed by a three-game winning streak and a fairly respectable 4–2 start with wins against their division opponent Atlanta Falcons and New Orleans Saints. The Buccaneers were tied for first place in the NFC South in mid-October; however, self-inflicted troubles started affecting the season, leading to a brutal 10-game losing streak to finish the season, all but two of these losses being by multiple possessions. Turnovers, penalties and poor defense began taking its toll. Quarterback Josh Freeman threw 22 interceptions (second-worst in the league), more than triple his total from 2010. The once dominating Tampa Bay defense ranked 30th in the league in total yards.

Statistically, the Buccaneers defense was among the worst in the league in 2011. Tampa Bay allowed the most points in the league (494), the most yards per play (tied at 6.3), most yards per pass attempt (tied at 7.6), the most rushing yards (2,497) and the most rushing touchdowns (26). They also allowed the second most yards per attempt (5.0), the second most rushing first downs (135), the third most total yards (6,311) and fourth most total first downs (356) of all teams in 2011.

== Offseason ==
=== 2011 draft board ===
After finishing the 2010 season 10–6 and narrowly missing the playoffs, the Buccaneers had the 20th overall pick in the 2011 NFL draft. A provision in the now expired collective bargaining agreement ensured that the draft still take place, despite the current lockout and lack of a new CBA.

2011 Tampa Bay Buccaneers Draft
Round	Selection	Player	Position	College	Notes
1	20	Adrian Clayborn	Defensive end	Iowa	
2	51	Da'Quan Bowers	Defensive end	Clemson	
3	84	Mason Foster	Outside linebacker	Washington	
4	116	Luke Stocker	Tight end	Tennessee	
5	151	Ahmad Black	Strong safety	Florida	(Note: The Buccaneers traded one of its two fifth-round selections (#135 overall, previously acquired from the Denver Broncos in exchange for two 2010 seventh round selections) to the Kansas City Chiefs in exchange for the Chiefs' sixth-round selection (#187 overall) and DT Alex Magee.)
6	187	Allen Bradford	Running back	Southern California	(Note: In March 2010, the Buccaneers traded its original sixth-round selection (#184 overall) to the Philadelphia Eagles in exchange for WR Reggie Brown.) (Note: See draft note 1.)
7	222	Anthony Gaitor	Cornerback	Florida International	
7	238	Daniel Hardy	Tight end	Idaho	(Note: Compensatory selection.)

== Roster changes ==
Sources: as of 09/28/2011 2:00 p.m. EDT

- Clubs are allowed 90 active players at the opening of training camp.
- Clubs must cut rosters to 80 active players by August 30.
- Clubs must cut final rosters to 53 active players by September 3.

=== Players re-signed ===
- Ronde Barber
- Quincy Black
- Jeremy Trueblood
- Davin Joseph
- Adam Hayward
- Michael Bennett
- Demar Dotson
- Tim Crowder
- ~~Frank Okam~~ (cut)
- Micheal Spurlock
- Elbert Mack
- Corey Lynch
- James Lee
- Connor Barth
- ~~E. J. Wilson~~ (IR)

=== Players signed ===
- Michael Koenen
- Devin Holland
- Zac Diles
- ~~Raymond Webber~~ (IR)
- Zack Pianalto (claimed off waivers)
- Chris Riley (claimed off waivers)
- Albert Haynesworth (claimed off waivers)
- Matt Clapp
- Collin Franklin
- Swanson Miller
- Nic Grinsby
- Daniel Te'o-Nesheim

=== Players released/losses ===
- Carnell Williams (StL)
- Barrett Ruud (Ten)
- Maurice Stovall (Det)
- John Gilmore (Pit)
- Quintin Borders
- Josh Jasper
- Doug Worthington (Wash)
- Mike Coughlin
- Aaron Feld
- Deonte Jackson
- Victor Aiyewa
- Jose Cruz
- Brandon Carter
- Aundrae Allison
- Vince Anderson
- Brandon Gilbeaux
- Detron Lewis
- Robert Malone (Det)
- Jock Sanders
- Ashton Youboty
- Rendrick Taylor
- Tyrone McKenzie (Min)
- Kyle Moore (Det)
- Armando Allen (Chi)
- John Malecki
- Matt Allen
- Cory Brandon
- Thomas Claiborne
- Jonathan Crompton (Wash)
- Marc Dile
- Daniel Hardy
- Dominique Harris
- Brandon Heath
- Simoni Lawrence
- Alex Magee
- Nathan Overbay
- Maurice Price
- Ryan Purvis
- Nick Reveiz
- Jacob Rogers
- Al Woods (Det)
- D. J. Johnson (Min)
- Scott Albritton
- Ross Homan
- Will Barker (Mia)
- Allen Bradford (Sea)

=== Practice Squad ===
- Chris Riley
- Ahmad Black
- Rudy Carpenter
- Collin Franklin
- Ed Gant
- Nic Grinsby
- Swanson Miller
- Matt Clapp

=== Injuries/reserve lists ===
- Andrew Economos was placed on the PUP list (Sept. 3); he was re-activated November 4.
- Cody Grimm suffered damage to the MCL in his right knee (week 3) and was placed on injured reserve.
- Running back Earnest Graham was placed on injured reserve after suffering a torn Achilles tendon during the game against Chicago.
- Gerald McCoy was placed in injured reserve with an arm injury (November 7)

=== Selected staff and personnel ===
- Head coach Raheem Morris – Club exercised two-year contract extension (fired January 2, 2012)
- General manager Mark Dominik – Four-year contract extension
- Pat Morris named offensive line coach.
- Keith Millard named defensive line coach.
- Grady Stretz named defensive line coach.

== Preseason ==
=== Schedule ===
Week	Date	Opponent	Result	Record	Venue	Recap
1	August 12	at Kansas City Chiefs	W 25–0	1–0	Arrowhead Stadium	Recap
2	August 18	New England Patriots	L 14–31	1–1	Raymond James Stadium	Recap
3	August 27	Miami Dolphins	W 17–13	2–1	Raymond James Stadium	Recap
4	September 1	at Washington Redskins	L 24–29	2–2	FedExField	Recap

- On March 21, 2011, Aqib Talib was arrested and charged with aggravated assault with a deadly weapon following an incident in Garland, Texas, in which Talib and his mother allegedly shot at a man. On August 23, Talib met with NFL commissioner Roger Goodell regarding possible game suspensions regarding his charge. On August 27, it was announced that Talib would not be suspended for any games.

== Regular season ==
=== Schedule ===
The Buccaneers' regular season schedule was announced April 19. Tampa Bay played Chicago at Wembley Stadium in London, England, on October 23 as part of the NFL International Series, with Tampa Bay serving as the host team.

The team's Ring of Honor induction ceremony took place during the December 4 game against Carolina. The team honored Jimmie Giles at halftime, and wore their orange throwback uniforms.

Week	Date	Opponent	Result	Record	Venue	Recap
1	September 11	Detroit Lions	L 20–27	0–1	Raymond James Stadium	Recap
2	September 18	at Minnesota Vikings	W 24–20	1–1	Hubert H. Humphrey Metrodome	Recap
3	September 25	Atlanta Falcons	W 16–13	2–1	Raymond James Stadium	Recap
4	October 3	Indianapolis Colts	W 24–17	3–1	Raymond James Stadium	Recap
5	October 9	at San Francisco 49ers	L 3–48	3–2	Candlestick Park	Recap
6	October 16	New Orleans Saints	W 26–20	4–2	Raymond James Stadium	Recap
7	October 23	Chicago Bears	L 18–24	4–3	(United Kingdom) Wembley Stadium (London, England)	Recap
8	Bye					
9	November 6	at New Orleans Saints	L 16–27	4–4	Mercedes-Benz Superdome	Recap
10	November 13	Houston Texans	L 9–37	4–5	Raymond James Stadium	Recap
11	November 20	at Green Bay Packers	L 26–35	4–6	Lambeau Field	Recap
12	November 27	at Tennessee Titans	L 17–23	4–7	LP Field	Recap
13	December 4	Carolina Panthers	L 19–38	4–8	Raymond James Stadium	Recap
14	December 11	at Jacksonville Jaguars	L 14–41	4–9	EverBank Field	Recap
15	December 17	Dallas Cowboys	L 15–31	4–10	Raymond James Stadium	Recap
16	December 24	at Carolina Panthers	L 16–48	4–11	Bank of America Stadium	Recap
17	January 1	at Atlanta Falcons	L 24–45	4–12	Georgia Dome	Recap

LEGEND:

# Indicates that the Buccaneers wore their white jerseys at home.
Orange indicates designated throwback game.

=== Game summaries ===
==== Week 1: vs. Detroit Lions ====
Week One: Detroit Lions vs Tampa Bay Buccaneers – Game summary

Quarter	1	2	3	4	Total
Lions	6	14	7	0	27
Buccaneers	10	3	0	7	20

at Raymond James Stadium, Tampa, Florida

- Date: September 11
- Game time: 1:00 p.m. EDT
- Game weather: 86° F (Sunny)
- Game attendance: 51,274
- Referee: Walt Anderson
- TV announcers (Fox): Chris Myers, Tim Ryan and Jennifer Hale (blacked out locally)
- Gamebook

Game information

First quarter

- DET – Hanson 23-yard field goal, Det 3–0
- TB – Barth 38-yard field goal, Tied 3–3
- TB – Talib 28-yard interception return (Barth kick), TB 10–3
- DET – Hanson 28-yard field goal, TB 10–6

Second quarter

- DET – Johnson 36-yard pass from Stafford (Hanson kick), Det 13–10
- DET – Scheffler 11-yard pass from Stafford (Hanson kick), Det 20–10
- TB – Barth 31-yard field goal, Lions 20–13

Third quarter

- DET – Johnson 1-yard pass from Stafford (Hanson kick), Det 27–13

Fourth quarter

- TB – Williams 7-yard pass from Freeman (Barth kick), Det 27–20

Top passers

- DET – Stafford – 24/33, 305 yards, 3 touchdowns, 1 interception
- TB – Freeman – 28/43, 259 yards, 1 touchdown, 1 interception

Top rushers

- DET – Best – 21 rushes, 72 yards
- TB – Freeman – 4 rushes, 26 yards

Top receivers

- DET – Johnson – 6 receptions, 88 yards, 2 touchdowns
- TB – Winslow – 6 receptions, 66 yards

Top tacklers

- DET – Spievey – 7 tackles
- TB – Hayes – 8 tackles

Detroit scored two touchdowns in the second quarter, and led Tampa Bay 27–13 late in the game. Josh Freeman suffered through some cramping issues, but rallied the Buccaneers to score a touchdown with under four minutes remaining. The subsequent onside kick failed, but the Buccaneers were able to get the ball back in the final two minutes. Freeman drove Tampa Bay to the Lions 42-yard line in the closings seconds, but they were unable to score.

==== Week 2: at Minnesota Vikings ====
Week Two: Tampa Bay Buccaneers at Minnesota Vikings – Game summary

Quarter	1	2	3	4	Total
Buccaneers	0	0	10	14	24
Vikings	7	10	0	3	20

at Mall of America Field at Hubert H. Humphrey Metrodome, Minneapolis, Minnesota

- Date: September 18
- Game time: 1:00 p.m. EDT/12:00 p.m. CDT
- Game weather: Played indoors (dome stadium)
- Game attendance: 62,461
- Referee: Jeff Triplette
- TV announcers (Fox): Dick Stockton and John Lynch
- Gamebook

Game information

First quarter

- Min – Peterson 1-yard touchdown run (Longwell kick), Min 7–0

Second quarter

- Min – Longwell 22-yard field goal, Min 10–0
- Min – Peterson 9-yard touchdown run (Longwell kick), Min 17–0

Third quarter

- TB – Blount 27-yard touchdown run (Barth kick), Min 17–7
- TB – Barth 36-yard field goal, Min 17–10
- Min – Longwell 29-yard field goal, Min 20–10

Fourth quarter

- TB – Benn 25-yard touchdown pass from Freeman (Barth kick), Min 20–17
- TB – Blount 4-yard touchdown run (Barth kick), TB 24–20

Top passers

- TB – Josh Freeman – 22/31, 243 yards, 1 touchdown, 1 interception
- MIN – Donovan McNabb – 18/30, 228 yards, 0 touchdowns, 0 interceptions

Top rushers

- TB – LeGarrette Blount – 13 rushes, 71 yards, 2 touchdowns
- MIN – Adrian Peterson – 25 rushes, 120 yards, 2 touchdowns

Top receivers

- TB – Preston Parker – 7 receptions, 98 yards
- MIN – Percy Harvin – 7 receptions, 76 yards

Top tacklers

- TB – Mason Foster – 7 tackles, 3 assists (1 sack)
- MIN – Antoine Winfield – 11 tackles

Minnesota led Tampa Bay 17–0 at halftime, but the Buccaneers rallied for the 24–20 victory on the road. In the final four minutes, Josh Freeman drove the Buccaneers 61 yards in 9 plays, capped off by a game-winning 4-yard touchdown run by LeGarrette Blount with 35 seconds remaining.

==== Week 3: vs. Atlanta Falcons ====
Week Three: Atlanta Falcons vs Tampa Bay Buccaneers – Game summary

Quarter	1	2	3	4	Total
Falcons	0	3	0	10	13
Buccaneers	3	10	3	0	16

at Raymond James Stadium, Tampa, Florida

- Date: September 25
- Game time: 4:15 p.m. EDT
- Game weather: 89 °F (32 °C) (Rain)
- Game attendance: 46,995
- Referee: Clete Blakeman
- TV announcers (Fox): Thom Brennaman, Brian Billick and Laura Okmin (Blacked out locally)
- Gamebook

Game information

First quarter

- TB – Barth 38-yard field goal, TB 3–0

Second quarter

- Atl – Bryant 26-yard field goal, Tied 3–3
- TB – Freeman 1-yard touchown run (Barth kick), TB 10–3
- TB – Barth 26-yard field goal, TB 13–3

Third quarter

- TB – Barth 28-yard field goal, TB 16–3

Fourth quarter

- Atl – Gonzalez 10-yard touchdown pass from Ryan (Bryant kick), TB 16–10
- Atl – Bryant 336-yard field goal, TB 16–13

Top passers

- ATL – Matt Ryan – 27/47, 330 yards, 1 touchdown, 1 interception
- TB – Josh Freeman – 22/32, 180 yards, 0 touchdowns, 2 interceptions

Top rushers

- ATL – Michael Turner – 11 rushes, 20 yards
- TB – LeGarrette Blount – 24 rushes, 81 yards

Top receivers

- ATL – Roddy White – 9 receptions, 140 yards
- TB – Earnest Graham – 7 receptions, 37 yards

Top tacklers

- ATL – Sean Weatherspoon – 10 tackles, 1 assist
- TB – E. J. Biggers – 7 tackles

Tampa Bay led Atlanta 16–13 with 1:49 remaining. The Buccaneers faced 4th down & 1 at the Atlanta 44-yard line. The Falcons had no timeouts remaining, and were looking to get the ball back for one last drive. Josh Freeman and the Buccaneers lined up for the fourth down play, and the Falcons flinched on the hard count. The Falcons were penalized 5 yards for Offsides, the Buccaneers received a first down, and were able to run the clock out the secure the victory.

Tampa Bay snapped a 5-game losing streak to their division rivals, and coach Raheem Morris won his first game against Atlanta.

==== Week 4: vs. Indianapolis Colts ====
Week Four: Indianapolis Colts vs Tampa Bay Buccaneers – Game summary

Quarter	1	2	3	4	Total
Colts	3	7	7	0	17
Buccaneers	0	7	10	7	24

at Raymond James Stadium, Tampa, Florida

- Date: Monday October 3
- Game time: 8:30 p.m. EDT
- Game weather: 80 °F (27 °C) (Clear)
- Game attendance: 63,972
- Referee: Ron Winter
- TV announcers (ESPN): Mike Tirico, Ron Jaworski, Jon Gruden and Wendi Nix
- Gamebook

Game information

First quarter

- IND – Vinatieri 45-yard field goal, IND 3–0

Second quarter

- IND – Garçon 87-yard touchdown pass from Painter (Vinatieri kick), IND 10–0
- TB – Freeman 1-yard touchdown run (Barth kick), IND 10–7

Third quarter

- TB – Barth 46-yard field goal, Tied 10–10
- IND – Garçon 59-yard touchdown pass from Painter (Vinatieri kick), IND 17–10
- IND – Parker 13-yard touchdown pass from Freeman (Barth kick), Tied 17–17

Fourth quarter

- TB – Blount 35-yard touchdown run (Barth kick), TB 24–17

Top passers

- IND – Curtis Painter – 13/30, 281 yards, 2 touchdowns, 0 interceptions
- TB – Josh Freeman – 25/39, 287 yards, 1 touchdown, 0 interceptions

Top rushers

- IND – Joseph Addai – 11 rushes, 41 yards
- TB – LeGarrette Blount – 25 rushes, 127 yards, 1 touchdown

Top receivers

- IND – Reggie Wayne – 4 receptions, 59 yards
- TB – Preston Parker – 4 receptions, 70 yards, 1 touchdown

Top tacklers

- IND – Conner – 14 tackles, 4 assists
- TB – Gerald McCoy – 5 tackles, 1 assist, 1 sack

Tampa Bay hosted the winless Indianapolis Colts on Monday Night Football. Miscues and penalties nearly cost the Buccaneers control of the game, but Josh Freeman threw for 287 yards, and LeGarrette Blount rushed for 127 yards, as Tampa Bay won the game 24–17. Curtis Painter started at quarterback for the Colts, his first career NFL start.

The Colts led early after an Adam Vinatieri field goal. Tampa Bay then sacked Painter and recovered the fumble. Connor Barth's field goal attempt, however, bounced off the upright, and the score remained 3–0. Late in the first quarter, Freeman connected to Arrelious Benn, who ran 62 yards for an apparent touchdown. However, the touchdown was nullified since Benn has stepped out-of-bounds before the catch (illegal touching).

In the second quarter, the Buccaneers pinned the Colts at their own 2-yard line. Painter threw to Pierre Garçon, who ran for an 87-yard touchdown, and 10–0 lead. Tampa Bay answered with a touchdown, and trimmed the score to 10–7. In the final seconds of the first half, Freeman drove the Buccaneers to the Colts 19-yard line, but was sacked with 20 seconds to go and counting. The field goal unit hurried on to the field, and the field goal was initially good. Tampa Bay, however, was penalized for 12 men on the field, and the score was nullified.

Tied 17–17 in the fourth quarter, Tampa Bay received a punt with just under 7 minutes remaining. LeGarrette Blount blasted for a 35-yard touchdown run, and a 24–17 Tampa Bay lead. In the final three minutes, Tampa Bay ran out the clock, including a "4th & Inches" quarterback sneak by Freeman, to seal the victory.

This was Tampa Bay's first appearance on Monday Night Football since 2008, and the first home Monday night game since 2003. This MNF telecast was notable in that Hank Williams, Jr.'s "All My Rowdy Friends" opening was omitted due to comments he made on Fox & Friends earlier in the day where he compared a golf outing involving Barack Obama, John Boehner, Joe Biden, and John Kasich to "Hitler playing golf with Netanyahu."

==== Week 5: at San Francisco 49ers ====
Week Five: Tampa Bay Buccaneers at San Francisco 49ers – Game summary

Quarter	1	2	3	4	Total
Buccaneers	3	0	0	0	3
49ers	7	17	10	14	48

at Candlestick Park, San Francisco, California

- Date: October 9
- Game time: 4:05 p.m. EDT/1:05 p.m. PDT
- Game weather: 62 °F (17 °C) (Sunny)
- Game attendance: 69,732
- Referee: Terry McAulay
- TV announcers (Fox): Kenny Albert, Daryl Johnston, Tony Siragusa
- Gamebook

Game information

First quarter

- SF — Walker 26-yard touchdown pass from Smith (Akers kick), SF 7–0
- TB — Barth 24-yard field goal, SF 7–3

Second quarter

- SF — Rogers 31-yard interception return (Akers kick), SF 14–3
- SF — Gore 2-yard touchdown run, SF 21–3
- SF — Akers 37-yard field goal, SF 24–3

Third quarter

- SF — Davis 23-yard touchdown pass from Smith (Akers kick), SF 31–3
- SF — Akers 27-yard field goal, SF 34–3

Fourth quarter

- SF — Davis 14-yard touchdown pass from Smith (Akers kick), SF 41–3
- SF — Dixon 1-yard touchdown run (Akers kick),SF 48–3

Top passers

- TB – Josh Freeman – 17/33, 187 yards, 2 interceptions
- SF – Alex Smith – 11/19, 170 yards, 3 touchdowns, 0 interceptions

Top rushers

- TB – LeGarrette Blount – 10 rushes, 34 yards
- SF – Frank Gore – 20 rushes, 125 yards, 1 touchdown

Top receivers

- TB – Kellen Winslow – 5 receptions, 54 yards
- SF – Josh Morgan – 5 receptions, 75 yards

Top tacklers

- TB – Sean Jones – 8 tackles
- SF – Patrick Willis – 10 tackles, 2 assists

Josh Freeman threw two interceptions (one returned for a touchdown), as Tampa Bay was routed 48–3 at San Francisco. Tampa Bay was held to only 86 yards rushing, had three turnovers, and suffered 9 penalties for a total of 96 yards.

==== Week 6: vs. New Orleans Saints ====
Week Six: New Orleans Saints vs Tampa Bay Buccaneers – Game summary

Quarter	1	2	3	4	Total
Saints	7	3	3	7	20
Buccaneers	3	17	3	3	26

at Raymond James Stadium, Tampa, Florida

- Date: October 16
- Game time: 4:15 p.m. EDT
- Game weather: 84 °F (29 °C) (Cloudy)
- Game attendance: 56,590
- Referee: Jerome Boger
- TV announcers (Fox): Ron Pitts & Jim Mora, Jr. (blacked out locally)
- Gamebook

Game information

First quarter

- TB – Barth 48-yard field goal, TB 3–0
- NO – Colston 38-yard touchdown pass from Brees (Kasay kick), NO 7-0

Second quarter

- TB – Benn 65-yard touchdown pass from Freeman (Barth kick), TB 10–7
- TB – Barth 42-yard field goal, TB 13–7
- TB – Parker 19-yard touchdown pass from Freeman (Barth kick), TB 20–7
- NO – Kasay 33-yard field goal, TB 20–10

Third quarter

- NO – Kasay 24-yard field goal, TB 20–13
- TB – Barth 42-yard field goal, TB 23–13

Fourth quarter

- NO – Ingram 12-yard touchdown run (Kasay kick), TB 23–20
- TB – Barth 38-yard field goal, TB 26–20

Top passers

- NO – Drew Brees – 29/45, 383 yards, 1 touchdown, 3 interceptions
- TB – Josh Freeman – 23/41, 303 yards, 2 touchdowns, 0 interceptions

Top rushers

- NO – Mark Ingram II – 9 rushes, 22 yards, 1 touchdown
- TB – Earnest Graham – 17 rushes, 109 yards

Top receivers

- NO – Darren Sproles – 8 receptions, 46 yards
- TB – Mike Williams – 6 receptions, 59 yards

Top tacklers

- NO – Malcolm Jenkins – 6 tackles, 1 assist
- TB – Ronde Barber – 6 tackles, 1 assist

Josh Freeman threw for 303 yards and two touchdown passes, as Tampa Bay rebounded from the previous week, and beat divisional rival New Orleans by a score of 26–20. Drew Brees threw three interceptions, and the Saints lost a fumble, and Tampa Bay scored 10 points off of turnovers.

Trailing 26–20 midway through the fourth quarter, Brees drove the Saints to the Tampa Bay 4-yard line. On 4th down & 2 with 3:24 remaining, Brees was intercepted in the endzone by Quincy Black. The Buccaneers ran out the clock, and preserved the win.

==== Week 7: vs. Chicago Bears ====
Week Seven: Chicago Bears vs Tampa Bay Buccaneers – Game summary

Quarter	1	2	3	4	Total
Bears	7	7	7	3	24
Buccaneers	2	3	0	13	18

at Wembley Stadium, London, England (NFL International Series)

- Date: October 23
- Game time: 6:00 p.m. BST/1:00 p.m. EDT
- Game weather: 62 °F (17 °C) (Clear)
- Game attendance: 76,981
- Referee: Tony Corrente
- TV announcers (Fox): Kenny Albert, Daryl Johnston, Tony Siragusa
- Gamebook

Game information

First quarter

- Chi – Forté 32-yard touchdown run (Gould kick), Chi 7–0
- TB – Barber safety, Chi 7–2

Second quarter

- Chi – Williams 25-yard touchdown pass from Cutler (Gould kick), Chi 14–2
- TB – Barth 33-yard field goal, Chi 14–5

Third quarter

- Chi – Barber 12-yard touchdown run (Gould kick), Chi 21–5

Fourth quarter

- TB – Winslow 2-yard touchdown pass from Freeman (pass failed), Chi 21–11
- TB – Briscoe 24-yard touchdown pass from Freeman (Barth kick), Chi 21–18
- Chi – Gould 25-yard field goal, Chi 24–18

Top passers

- CHI – Cutler – 17/32, 226 yards, 1 touchdown, 2 interceptions
- TB – Josh Freeman – 29/51, 264 yards, 2 touchdowns, 4 interceptions

Top rushers

- CHI – Matt Forté – 25 rushes, 145 yards, 1 touchdown
- TB – Kregg Lumpkin – 8 rushes, 15 yards

Top receivers

- CHI – Roy Williams – 4 receptions, 59 yards, 1 touchdown
- TB – Mike Williams – 6 receptions, 75 yards

Top tacklers

- CHI – Charles Tillman – 9 tackles, 1 assist
- TB – Sean Jones – 6 tackles, 1 assist

Tampa Bay hosted Chicago at Wembley Stadium in London, England, their second time participating in the NFL International Series. Josh Freeman threw four interceptions, and Tampa Bay lost one fumble for five total turnovers. Chicago stretched out to a 21–5 lead before the Buccaneers staged a rally in the fourth quarter. Freeman threw two touchdown passes and the deficit was trimmed to 24–18 in the final two minutes. Freeman drove the Buccaneers to the Chicago 39-yard line, but the comeback was thwarted when he was intercepted with 37 seconds left.

Running back LeGarrette Blount was inactive due to injury, and Earnest Graham left the game in the first quarter due to an ankle injury. Third-string running back Kregg Lumpkin was left to handle rushing duties, but managed only 15 yards.

==== Week 9: at New Orleans Saints ====
Week Nine: Tampa Bay Buccaneers at New Orleans Saints – Game summary

Quarter	1	2	3	4	Total
Buccaneers	0	3	3	10	16
Saints	7	10	7	3	27

at Mercedes-Benz Superdome, New Orleans, Louisiana

- Date: November 6
- Game time: 1:00 p.m. EST/12:00 p.m. CST
- Game weather: Played indoors (dome stadium)
- Game attendance: 73,043
- Referee: Carl Cheffers
- TV announcers (Fox): Dick Stockton and John Lynch
- Gamebook

Game information

First quarter

- NO – Moore 3-yard touchdown pass from Brees (Kasay kick), NO 7-0

Second quarter

- NO – Sproles 21-yard touchdown pass from Brees (Kasay kick), NO 14-0
- TB – Barth 40-yard field goal, NO 14-3
- NO – Kasay 21-yard field goal, NO 17-3

Third quarter

- TB – Barth 48-yard field goal, NO 17-6
- NO – Thomas 9-yard touchdown run (Kasay kick), NO 24-6

Fourth quarter

- TB – Barth 25-yard field goal, NO 24-9
- TB – Winslow 5-yard touchdown pass from Freeman (Barth kick), NO 24-16
- NO – Kasay 34-yard field goal, NO 27-16

Top passers

- NO – Drew Brees – 27/36, 258 yards, 2 touchdown, 1 interception
- TB – Josh Freeman – 27/37, 281 yards, 1 touchdowns, 0 interceptions

Top rushers

- TB – LeGarrette Blount – 13 rushes, 72 yards
- NO – Chris Ivory – 15 rushes, 67 yards

Top receivers

- TB – Mike Williams – 6 receptions, 46 yards
- NO – Jimmy Graham – 6 receptions, 78 yards

Top tacklers

- TB – Mason Foster – 7 tackles, 2 assists
- NO – Jonathan Casillas – 4 tackles, 6 assists

New Orleans jumped out to a 24–6 lead, behind Drew Brees' 258 yards passing and 195 combined rushing yards. However, Tampa Bay tried to rally in the fourth quarter. Josh Freeman threw a touchdown pass to Kellen Winslow with 5:33 to go. The Saints, however, were able to run out the clock, and kicked a game-icing field goal to win 27–16.

==== Week 10: vs. Houston Texans ====
Week Ten: Houston Texans vs Tampa Bay Buccaneers – Game summary

Quarter	1	2	3	4	Total
Texans	9	7	14	7	37
Buccaneers	0	3	0	6	9

at Raymond James Stadium, Tampa, Florida

- Date: November 13
- Game time: 1:00 p.m. EST
- Game weather: 77 °F (25 °C) (Partly Cloudy)
- Game attendance: 56,037
- Referee: John Parry
- TV announcers (CBS): Marv Albert and Rich Gannon (blacked out locally)
- Gamebook

Game information

First quarter

- Hou – Jones 80-yard touchdown pass from Schaub (kick blocked), Hou 6–0
- Hou – Rackers 22-yard field goal, Hou 9–0

Second quarter

- Hou – Foster 78-yard touchdown pass from Schaub (Rackers kick), Hou 16–0
- TB – Barth 55-yard field goal, Hou 16–3

Third quarter

- Hou – Foster 5-yard touchdown run (Rackers kick), Hou 23–3
- Hou – Ward 4-yard touchdown run (Rackers kick), Hou 30–3

Fourth quarter

- TB – Parker 9-yard touchdown pass from Freeman (pass failed), Hou 30–9
- Hou – Tate 11-yard touchdown run (Rackers kick), Hou 37–9

Top passers

- HOU – Matt Schaub – 11/15, 242 yards, 2 touchdowns, 0 interceptions
- TB – Josh Freeman – 15/33, 170 yards, 1 touchdown, 3 interceptions

Top rushers

- HOU – Arian Foster – 17 rushes, 84 yards
- TB – LeGarrette Blount – 10 rushes, 34 yards, 1 touchdown

Top receivers

- HOU – Arian Foster – 4 receptions, 102 yards, 1 touchdown
- TB – Kregg Lumpkin – 5 receptions, 30 yards

Top tacklers

- HOU – Brian Cushing – 8 tackles, 1 sack
- TB – Adam Hayward – 7 tackles, 1 assist

Tampa Bay lost their fourth game out of the last five, falling to Houston by the score of 37–9. On the first play of the game, Matt Schaub completed a pass to Jacoby Jones, who proceeded to go for an 80-yard touchdown. In the second quarter, Arian Foster had a 78-yard touchdown reception from Schaub, and the Texans were in control of the game throughout. Josh Freeman threw three interceptions, two of which led to touchdowns for Houston.

==== Week 11: at Green Bay Packers ====
Week Eleven: Tampa Bay Buccaneers at Green Bay Packers – Game summary

Quarter	1	2	3	4	Total
Buccaneers	0	10	3	13	26
Packers	7	14	0	14	35

at Lambeau Field, Green Bay, Wisconsin

- Date: November 20
- Game time: 1:00 p.m. EST/12:00 p.m. CST
- Game weather: 32 °F (0 °C) (Cloudy)
- Game attendance: 70,498
- Referee: Alberto Riveron
- TV announcers (Fox): Joe Buck, Troy Aikman and Pam Oliver
- Gamebook

Game information

First quarter

- GB – Raji 1-yard touchdown run (Crosby kick), GB 7–0
- GB – Crabtree 5-yard touchdown pass from Rodgers (Crosby kick), GB 14–0

Second quarter

- TB – Blount 54-yard touchdown run (Barth kick), GB 14–7
- TB – Barth 23-yard field goal, GB 14–10
- GB – Nelson 5-yard touchdown pass from Rodgers (Crosby kick), GB 21–10

Third quarter

- TB – Barth 32-yard field goal, GB 21–13

Fourth quarter

- TB – Williams 5-yard touchdown pass from Freeman (pass failed), GB 21–19
- GB – Crabtree 2-yard touchdown run (Crosby kick), GB 28–19
- TB – Briscoe 2-yard touchdown pass from Freeman (Barth kick), GB 28–26
- GB – Nelson 40-yard touchdown pass from Rodgers (Crosby kick), GB 35–26

Top passers

- TB – Josh Freeman – 28/38, 342 yards, 2 touchdowns, 2 interceptions
- GB – Aaron Rodgers – 23/34, 299 yards, 3 touchdowns, 1 interception

Top rushers

- TB – LeGarrette Blount – 18 rushes, 107 yards, 1 touchdown
- GB – James Starks – 11 rushes, 38 yards

Top receivers

- TB – Kellen Winslow – 9 receptions, 132 yards
- GB – Jordy Nelson – 6 receptions, 123 yards, 2 touchdowns

Top tacklers

- TB – Sean Jones – 7 tackles, 1 assist
- GB – Tramon Williams – 7 tackles, 2 assists

Josh Freeman threw for 342 yards and two touchdowns, but Tampa Bay fell to Green Bay by a score of 35–26. With 4:25 remaining Tampa Bay scored a touchdown to trim the deficit to 28–26. An onside kick failed, and Green Bay took over. Green Bay iced the game with a touchdown with 2:55 to go.

Undefeated Green Bay improved to 10–0 on the season, and avoided the scare by the Buccaneers. Tampa Bay dropped to 4–6, losing to the Packers for the first time since 2003 and losing at Lambeau Field for the first time since 2001, the last year both teams were rivals in the former NFC Central division.

==== Week 12: at Tennessee Titans ====
Week Twelve: Tampa Bay Buccaneers at Tennessee Titans – Game summary

Quarter	1	2	3	4	Total
Buccaneers	3	7	7	0	17
Titans	7	3	0	13	23

at LP Field, Nashville, Tennessee

- Date: November 27
- Game time: 1:00 p.m. EST/12:00 p.m. CST
- Game weather: 47 °F (8 °C) (Cloudy)
- Game attendance: 69,143
- Referee: Bill Leavy
- TV announcers (Fox): Dick Stockton, John Lynch and Jennifer Hale
- Gamebook

Game information

First quarter

- TB – Barth 43-yard field goal, TB 3–0
- Ten – Campbell 84-yard kickoff return (Bironas kick), Ten 7–3

Second quarter

- Ten – Bironas 31-yard field goal, Ten 10–3
- TB – Williams 3-yard touchdown pass from Freeman (Barth kick), 10–10

Third quarter

- TB – Talib 27-yard interception return (Barth kick), TB 17–10

Fourth quarter

- Ten – Bironas 52-yard field goal, TB 17–13
- Ten – Williams 2-yard touchdown pass from Hasselbeck (Bironas kick), Ten 20–17
- Ten – Bironas 38-yard field goal, Ten 23–17

Top passers

- TB – Josh Freeman – 18/33, 199 yards, 1 touchdown, 1 interception
- TEN – Matt Hasselbeck – 19/34, 160 yards, 1 touchdown, 2 interceptions

Top rushers

- TB – LeGarrette Blount – 20 rushes, 103 yards
- TEN – Chris Johnson – 23 rushes, 190 yards

Top receivers

- TB – Mike Williams – 6 receptions, 84 yards, 1 touchdown
- TEN – Lavelle Hawkins – 5 receptions, 51 yards

Top tacklers

- TB – Ronde Barber – 6 tackles, 1 assist
- TEN – Colin McCarthy – 7 tackles, 3 assists

Tampa Bay and Tennessee combined for 9 turnovers on a rainy, sloppy afternoon. Chris Johnson ran for 190 yards, but Tampa Bay led 17–10 late in the fourth quarter.

Trailing 23–17, Josh Freeman drove Tampa Bay to the Tennessee 25-yard line in the final minute. Facing a 4th down and 1, Freeman tried a QB sneak, but fumbled the snap due to the wet ball. He was tackled for a loss, the Buccaneers turned the ball over on downs, and the Titans held on to win.

==== Week 13: vs. Carolina Panthers ====
Week Thirteen: Carolina Panthers vs Tampa Bay Buccaneers – Game summary

Quarter	1	2	3	4	Total
Panthers	14	10	7	7	38
Buccaneers	3	9	0	7	19

at Raymond James Stadium, Tampa, Florida

- Date: December 4
- Game time: 1:00 p.m. EST
- Game weather: 79 °F (26 °C) (Cloudy)
- Game attendance: 56,270
- Referee: Gene Steratore
- TV announcers (Fox): Ron Pitts, Jim Mora, Jr. and Drea Avent (blacked out locally)
- Gamebook

Game information

First quarter

- Car – Newton 1-yard run (Mare kick), Car 7–0
- Car – Stewart 1-yard run (Mare kick), Car 14–0
- TB – Barth 50-yard field goal, Car 14–3

Second quarter

- TB – Barth 47-yard field goal, Car 14–6
- Car – Naanee 19-yard pass from Newton (Mare kick), Car 21–6
- TB – Barth 46-yard field goal, Car 21–9
- TB – Barth 44-yard field goal, Car 21–12
- Car – Mare 43-yard field goal, Car 24–12

Third quarter

- Car – Newton 1-yard run (Mare kick), Car 31–12

Fourth quarter

- Car – Newton 1-yard run (Mare kick), Car 38–12
- TB – Briscoe 23-yard pass from Johnson (Barth kick), Car 38–19

Top passers

- Car – Newton, 12-/21, 204 yards, 1 touchdown, 0 interceptions
- TB – Johnson, 16/27, 229 yards, 1 touchdown, 1 interception

Top rushers

- Car – Stewart, 14 rushes, 80 yards, 1 touchdown
- TB – Johnson, 5 rushes, 45 yards

Top receivers

- Car – LaFell, 4 for 31 yards
- TB – Williams, 5 for 93 yards

Top tacklers

- Car – Godfrey, 7 tackles, 2 assists
- TB – Jones, 9 tackles, 1 assist

Josh Freeman sat out due to injury, and Josh Johnson started at quarterback. Tampa Bay wore their throwback uniforms, and honored Jimmie Giles at halftime. Cam Newton ran for three touchdowns (setting an NFL single-season record for rushing touchdowns by a quarterback) as Carolina routed Tampa Bay 38–19.

==== Week 14: at Jacksonville Jaguars ====
Week Fourteen: Tampa Bay Buccaneers at Jacksonville Jaguars – Game summary

Quarter	1	2	3	4	Total
Buccaneers	7	7	0	0	14
Jaguars	0	28	0	13	41

at EverBank Field, Jacksonville, Florida

- Date: December 11
- Game time: 1:00 p.m. EST
- Game weather: 58 °F (14 °C) (Rain)
- Game attendance: 62,562
- Referee: Jerome Boger
- TV announcers (Fox): Sam Rosen and Chad Pennington
- Gamebook

Game information

First quarter

- TB – Blount 1-yard touchdown run (Barth kick), TB 7–0

Second quarter

- TB – Freeman 13-yard touchdown run (Barth kick), TB 14–0
- JAX – Cloherty 8-yard fumble return (Scobee kick), TB 14–7
- JAX – Jones-Drew 1-yard touchdown run (Scobee kick), 14–14
- JAX – Collins fumble recovery in end zone (Scobee kick), JAX 21–14
- JAX – Jones-Drew 5-yard touchdown pass from Gabbert (Scobee kick), JAX 28–14

Third quarter

- None

Fourth quarter

- JAX – Jones-Drew 5-yard TD pass from Gabbert (Scobee kick), JAX 35–14
- JAX – Jones-Drew 1-yard TD run (run failed), JAX 41–14

Top passers

- TB – Freeman, 16/30, 181 yards, 2 interceptions, 0 touchdowns
- JAX – Gabbert, 19/33, 217 yards, 2 touchdowns, 2 interceptions

Top rushers

- TB – Blount, 18 rushes, 74 yards
- JAX – Jones-Drew, 27 rushes, 85 yards

Top receivers

- TB – Williams, 3 for 19 yards
- JAX – Jones-Drew, 6 for 51 yards, 2 touchdowns

Top tacklers

- TB – Jackson, 7 tackles
- JAX – Allen, 6 tackles, 1 assist

Quarterback Josh Freeman returned to the lineup and Tampa Bay jumped out to a 14–0 lead in the first quarter. However, Jacksonville scored 41 unanswered points to win 41–14. Maurice Jones-Drew scored a franchise-best four touchdowns (two rushing, two passing).

Tampa Bay committed seven turnovers in the loss. In the second quarter, Preston Parker fumbled a punt return, which was recovered by Colin Cloherty for an 8-yard touchdown. With the score 14–7, Freeman was sacked at his own goal line, fumbled, and Nate Collins recovered the ball in the end zone for a touchdown. Four plays later, Freeman was intercepted, which led to another Jacksonville touchdown. The Jaguars scored 28 points in the second quarter in a span of only 7:32.

At 4–9, Tampa Bay clinched a losing season, and was officially eliminated from playoff contention.

==== Week 15: vs. Dallas Cowboys ====
Week Fifteen: Dallas Cowboys vs Tampa Bay Buccaneers – Game summary

Quarter	1	2	3	4	Total
Cowboys	14	14	3	0	31
Buccaneers	0	0	15	0	15

at Raymond James Stadium, Tampa, Florida

- Date: December 17
- Game time: 8:20 p.m. EST
- Game weather: 66 °F (19 °C) (Clear)
- Game attendance: 65,162
- Referee: Terry McAulay
- TV announcers (NFLN): Brad Nessler, Mike Mayock and Alex Flanagan
- Gamebook

Game information

First quarter

- Dal – Austin 8-yard touchdown pass from Romo (Bailey kick), Dal 7–0
- Dal – Bryant 8-yard touchdown pass from Romo (Bailey kick), Dal 14–0

Second quarter

- Dal – Robinson 9-yard touchdown pass from Romo (Bailey kick), Dal 21–0
- Dal – Romo 1-yard touchdown run (Bailey kick), Dal 28–0

Third quarter

- TB – Watson 7-yard fumble recovery return (Barth kick), Dal 28–7
- Dal – Bailey 30-yard field goal, Dal 31–7

Fourth quarter

- TB – Briscoe 13-yard touchdown pass from Freeman (pass successful), Dal 31–15

Top passers

- DAL – Romo, 23/30, 249 yards, 3 touchdowns, 0 interceptions
- TB – Freeman, 17/27, 148 yards, 1 touchdown, 0 interceptions

Top rushers

- DAL – Jones, 22 rushes, 108 yards
- TB – Freeman, 4 rushes, 37 yards

Top receivers

- DAL – Lumpkin 5 receptions, 50 yards
- TB – Austin, 5 receptions, 53 yards, 1 touchdown

Top tacklers

- DAL – Scandrick – 5 tackles, 1 assist (1 sack)
- TB – Foster – 5 tackles, 3 assists

Tampa Bay hosted Dallas on Saturday Night. Dallas jumped out to a 28–0 halftime lead. Tony Romo threw for three touchdown passes, and ran for another. The Buccaneers tried to rally, but fell far short, losing 31–15.

==== Week 16: at Carolina Panthers ====
Week Sixteen: Tampa Bay Buccaneers at Carolina Panthers – Game summary

Quarter	1	2	3	4	Total
Buccaneers	0	10	0	6	16
Panthers	10	10	21	7	48

at Bank of America Stadium, Charlotte, North Carolina

- Date: December 24
- Game time: 1:00 p.m. EST
- Game weather: 51 °F (11 °C) (Partly Cloudy)
- Game attendance: 70,363
- Referee: Carl Cheffers
- TV announcers (Fox): Sam Rosen, Chad Pennington and Jody Jackson
- Gamebook

Game information

First quarter

- Car – Williams 8-yard touchdown run (Mare kick), Car 7–0
- Car – Mare 21-yard field goal, 'Car 10–0

Second quarter

- TB – Benn 4-yard touchdown pass from Freeman (Barth kick), Car 10–7
- Car – LaFell 91-yard touchdown pass from Newton (Mare kick), Car 17–7
- TB – Barth 42-yard field goal, Car 17–10
- Car – Mare 19-yard field goal, Car 20–10

Third quarter

- Car – Williams 22-yard touchdown run (Mare kick), Car 27–10
- Car – Stewart 11-yard touchdown pass from Newton (Mare kick), Car 34–10
- Car – Newton 49-yard touchdown run (Mare kick), Car 41–10

Fourth quarter

- Car – Shockey 8-yard touchdown pass from Newton (Mare kick), Car 48–10
- TB – Freeman 1-yard touchdown run (pass failed), Car 48–16

Top passers

- TB – Freeman, 28/38, 274 yards, 1 touchdown, 1 interception
- Car – Newton, 12/17, 171 yards, 3 touchdowns, 0 interceptions

Top rushers

- TB – Lumkin, 7 rushes for 24 yards
- Car – Stewart, 7 rushes for 88 yards

Top receivers

- TB – Winslow, 6 catches for 63 yards
- Car – LaFell, 3 catches for 103 yards, 1 touchdown

Top tacklers

- TB – Foster, 3 tackles, 3 assists
- Car – Senn, 8 tackles, 2 assists

On Christmas Eve, Cam Newton broke the NFL record for most rookie passing yards in a season. Carolina routed Tampa Bay for the second time this season, by a score of 48–16.

==== Week 17: at Atlanta Falcons ====
Week Seventeen: Tampa Bay Buccaneers at Atlanta Falcons – Game summary

Quarter	1	2	3	4	Total
Buccaneers	0	7	11	6	24
Falcons	21	21	0	3	45

at Georgia Dome, Atlanta, Georgia

- Date: January 1
- Game time: 4:15 p.m. EST
- Game weather: Played indoors (dome stadium)
- Game attendance: 68,167
- Referee: Scott Green
- TV announcers (Fox): Dick Stockton & John Lynch

Game information

First quarter

Second quarter

Third quarter

Fourth quarter

Top passers

- TB –
- ATL –

Top rushers

- TB –
- ATL –

Top receivers

- TB –
- ATL –

Top tacklers

- TB –
- ATL –

Atlanta jumped out to a 42–0 lead by the second quarter. Ronde Barber played in his franchise record 225th game, despite suffering an injured hand, for which he sat out the second half. With the loss, Tampa Bay ended the season with ten consecutive losses, finished with a record of 4–12, last in the NFC South, and head coach Raheem Morris was fired the next day.

=== Standings ===
NFC South
	W	L	T	PCT	DIV	CONF	PF	PA	STK
^{(3)} New Orleans Saints	13	3	0	.813	5–1	9–3	547	339	W8
^{(5)} Atlanta Falcons	10	6	0	.625	3–3	7–5	402	350	W1
Carolina Panthers	6	10	0	.375	2–4	3–9	406	429	L1
Tampa Bay Buccaneers	4	12	0	.250	2–4	3–9	287	494	L10

== Staff ==
Tampa Bay Buccaneers 2011 staff
Front office: Owner/President – Malcolm Glazer; Co-chairman – Bryan Glazer; Co-chairman – Edward Glazer; Co-chairman – Joel Glazer; General manager – Mark Dominik; Director of player personnel – Dennis Hickey; Coordinator of pro scouting – Shelton Quarles; Coordinator of football administration – Mike Greenberg; Head coaches: Head coach – Raheem Morris; Assistant to the head coach – Jay Kaiser; Offensive coaches: Offensive coordinator – Greg Olson; Quarterbacks – Alex Van Pelt; Running backs – Steve Logan; Wide receivers – Eric Yarber; Assistant wide receivers – Tim Berbenich; Tight ends – Alfredo Roberts; Offensive line – Pat Morris; Assistant offensive line – Tim Holt	Defensive coaches: Defensive line – Grady Stretz; Co-defensive line – Keith Millard; Linebackers – Joe Baker; Defensive backs – Jimmy Lake; Defensive quality control – Tyrone Pettaway; Special teams coaches: Special teams coordinator – Dwayne Stukes; Assistant special teams – Byron Storer; Coaches’ assistant – Brian Rasmussen; Strength and conditioning: Head strength and conditioning – Kurt Shultz; Assistant strength and conditioning – Chris Meenan

== Final roster ==
2011 Tampa Bay Buccaneers roster
Quarterbacks (QB): 12 Rudy Carpenter; 5 Josh Freeman; 11 Josh Johnson; Running backs (RB): 27 LeGarrette Blount; 44 Erik Lorig FB; 28 Kregg Lumpkin; 32 Mossis Madu; Wide receivers (WR): 17 Arrelious Benn; 89 Dezmon Briscoe; 87 Preston Parker; 81 Micheal Spurlock; 18 Sammie Stroughter; 19 Mike Williams; Tight ends (TE): 80 Zack Pianalto; 88 Luke Stocker; 82 Kellen Winslow II	Offensive linemen (OL): 69 Demar Dotson T; 52 Jeff Faine C; 73 Derek Hardman G; 75 Davin Joseph G; 62 Ted Larsen G; 77 James Lee T; 70 Donald Penn T; 65 Jeremy Trueblood T; 76 Jeremy Zuttah G/C; Defensive linemen (DL): 71 Michael Bennett DE; 91 Da'Quan Bowers DE; 94 Adrian Clayborn DE; 72 Jovan Haye DT; 95 Albert Haynesworth DT; 90 Roy Miller DT; 98 Frank Okam DT; 92 Brian Price DT	Linebackers (LB): 58 Quincy Black OLB; 59 Mason Foster MLB; 54 Geno Hayes OLB; 57 Adam Hayward MLB; 53 Nick Reed OLB; 50 Daniel Te'o-Nesheim OLB; 56 Dekoda Watson OLB; Defensive backs (DB): 22 Larry Asante SS; 20 Ronde Barber CB; 31 E. J. Biggers CB; 43 Ahmad Black SS; 24 Anthony Gaitor CB; 36 Tanard Jackson FS; 26 Sean Jones SS; 23 Myron Lewis CB; 41 Corey Lynch FS; 33 Elbert Mack CB; Special teams (ST): 10 Connor Barth K; 48 Andrew Economos LS; 9 Michael Koenen P	Practice squad: 49 Mike Balogun LB; 68 Lamar Divens DT; 85 Collin Franklin TE; 15 Ed Gant WR; 64 Mike Ingersoll T; 7 Brett Ratliff QB; 66 Chris Riley G; Reserve: 96 Tim Crowder DE (IR); 51 Jacob Cutrera OLB (IR); 34 Earnest Graham RB (IR); 35 Cody Grimm FS (IR); 30 Devin Holland SS (IR); 97 George Johnson DE (IR); 79 John McCargo DT (IR); 93 Gerald McCoy DT (IR); 25 Aqib Talib CB (IR); 86 Raymond Webber WR (IR); 78 E. J. Wilson DT (IR); Rookies in italics 53 active, 11 reserve, 7 practice squad

== Awards and milestones ==
- Week 3: Ronde Barber — NFC Defensive Player of the Week

== Television blackouts ==
=== Preseason ===
Both of Tampa Bay's home preseason games were blacked out on local television because they failed to sell out prior to 72 hours before kickoff. The affiliates affected include WTSP in the Tampa/St. Pete market, WFTV in the Orlando market and WFTX in the Fort Myers area. The game was shown instead in tape delay. The game was aired live on WTLH in Tallahassee since it falls outside the designated 75-mile blackout radius.

Dating back to 2010, Tampa Bay has had four consecutive preseason home games blacked out.

=== Regular season ===
Tampa Bay's week 1 game against Detroit and week 3 game against Atlanta failed to sell out, and were blacked out locally. Tampa Bay was the only NFL team to face a blackout in week 1. The FOX affiliates affected were WTVT in the Tampa/St. Pete market and WOFL in Orlando.

Dating back to 2010, Tampa Bay had ten consecutive regular season home games blacked out. The blackout streak ended in week 4, when the Buccaneers hosted the Colts on Monday Night Football. The game was carried live on ESPN and simulcast on WFTS.

The blackouts returned in week 6 with the game against New Orleans. Tampa Bay's week 7 game against Chicago in London was not subject to blackout, regardless of sellout status. The week 10 game against the Texans was blacked out, affecting WTSP and WKMG. The final blackout of the season occurred against Carolina in week 13. The final home game of the season against Dallas on December 17 sold out, and aired locally on NFL Network and simulcast on WTTA.
