= Mason Foster =

American football player (born 1989)

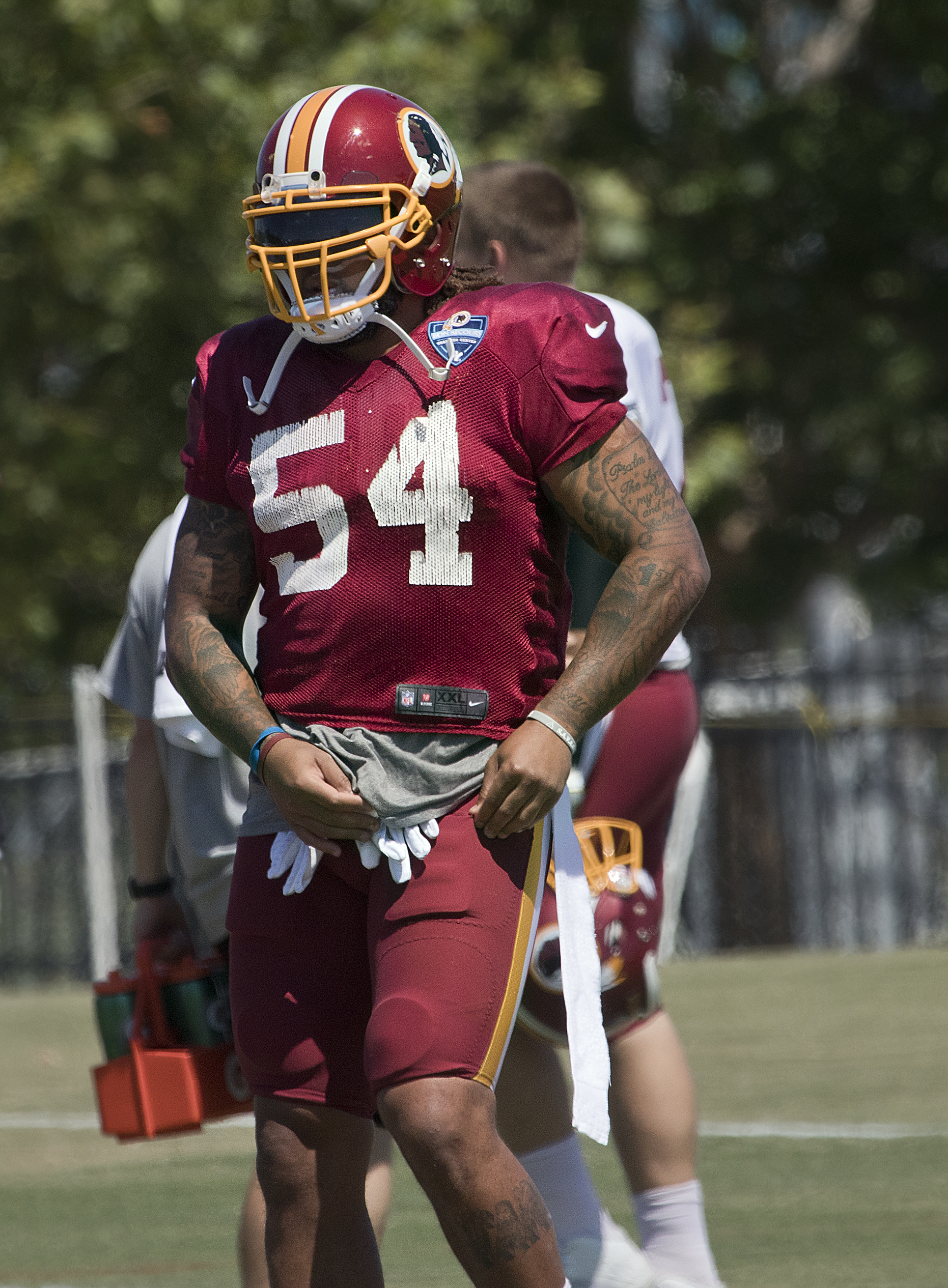
- Foster with the Washington Redskins in 2017

No. 59, 54
- Position: Linebacker

Personal information
- Born: March 1, 1989 (age 37); Monterey, California, U.S.
- Listed height: 6 ft 1 in (1.85 m)
- Listed weight: 250 lb (113 kg)

Career information
- High school: Seaside
- College: Washington (2007–2010)
- NFL draft: 2011: 3rd round, 84th overall pick

Career history
- Tampa Bay Buccaneers (2011–2014); Chicago Bears (2015)*; Washington Redskins (2015–2018)
- * Offseason or practice squad member only

Awards and highlights
- First-team All-American (2010); First-team All-Pac-10 (2010)

Career NFL statistics
- Total tackles: 667
- Sacks: 8.5
- Forced fumbles: 4
- Fumble recoveries: 5
- Interceptions: 8
- Defensive touchdowns: 2
- Stats at Pro Football Reference

Mason Foster (born March 1, 1989) is an American former professional football player who was a linebacker in the National Football League (NFL). He was selected by the Tampa Bay Buccaneers in the third round of the 2011 NFL draft. He played college football for the Washington Huskies. He was also a member of the Chicago Bears and Washington Redskins.

== Early life ==
Foster attended Seaside High School, where he played for the Seaside Spartans high school football team, leading them to a 12–1 overall record, a 5–0 league record, a Monterey Bay league title, and the CIF Central Coast Section small school championship in 2006. Foster led a defense that allowed just six points per game during the regular season and recorded four shutouts, as well as taking over at quarterback midway through the season. Foster was named the Monterey County player of the year by the Monterey Herald, defensive player of the year by the Salinas Californian, an All-Central Coast Section first-team linebacker by the San Jose Mercury News, and CalHiSports all-state first-team for 2006. He was ranked the No. 68 linebacker recruit in the country by Rivals.com.

Considered a three-star recruit by Rivals.com, Foster was listed as the No. 68 outside linebacker in the nation in 2007.

== College career ==
As a true freshman in 2007, Foster played in all 13 games, starting four games including three at weakside linebacker and one at middle linebacker.

As a sophomore in 2008, Foster started all 12 at one outside linebacker spot, leading the Pac-10 Conference in tackles per game with 8.75 and topped the University of Washington Huskies with 12.0 tackles for a loss. Foster earned honorable mention All-Pac-10 as well as being named the Huskies' team MVP (Defense).

As a junior in 2009, Foster started all 12 of the Huskies' games at one linebacker spot, finishing second on the team with 85 total tackles while leading the Pac-10 with six forced fumbles. Named honorable mention All-Pac-10 as well as The Sporting News All-Pac-10 first-team.

As a senior in 2010, Foster started all 13 of the Huskies' games at linebacker, recording 162 tackles (12.46/gm) finishing second in FBS. Foster was named an All-American. Earned Defensive MVP honors for the 2011 Holiday Bowl in a win over Nebraska. Was invited to, and played in the 2011 Senior Bowl.

== Professional career ==
=== Pre-draft ===
Prior to the Senior Bowl, Foster was projected to be a third or fourth round pick by the majority of NFL draft experts and scouts. On January 29, 2011, Foster played in the 2011 Senior Bowl and raised his draft stock after an impressive performance. He attended the NFL Scouting Combine in Indianapolis and was considered to be a top performer among his position group. On March 31, 2011, Foster attended Washington's pro day and chose to run to the 40-yard dash (4.74s), 20-yard dash (2.73s), 10-yard dash (1.62s), vertical jump (30.5"), short shuttle (4.48s), and three-cone drill (7.14s). At the conclusion of the pre-draft process, Foster was projected to be a third or fourth round pick by NFL draft experts and scouts. He was ranked as the tenth best outside linebacker prospect in the draft by DraftScout.com.

Pre-draft measurables
Height	Weight	Arm length	Hand span	Wingspan	40-yard dash	10-yard split	20-yard split	20-yard shuttle	Three-cone drill	Vertical jump	Broad jump	Bench press
6 ft 1 1/4 in (1.86 m)	245 lb (111 kg)	31 in (0.79 m)	9 5/8 in (0.24 m)	6 ft 2 3/8 in (1.89 m)	4.74 s	1.62 s	2.73 s	4.45 s	7.14 s	31 in (0.79 m)	9 ft 2 in (2.79 m)	22 reps
All values from NFL Combine/Pro Day

=== Tampa Bay Buccaneers ===
==== 2011 ====
The Tampa Bay Buccaneers selected Foster in the third round (84th overall) of the 2011 NFL draft. Foster was the 11th outside linebacker drafted in 2011.

On July 29, 2011, the Buccaneers signed Foster to a four-year, $2.78 million contract that includes a signing bonus of $525,000.

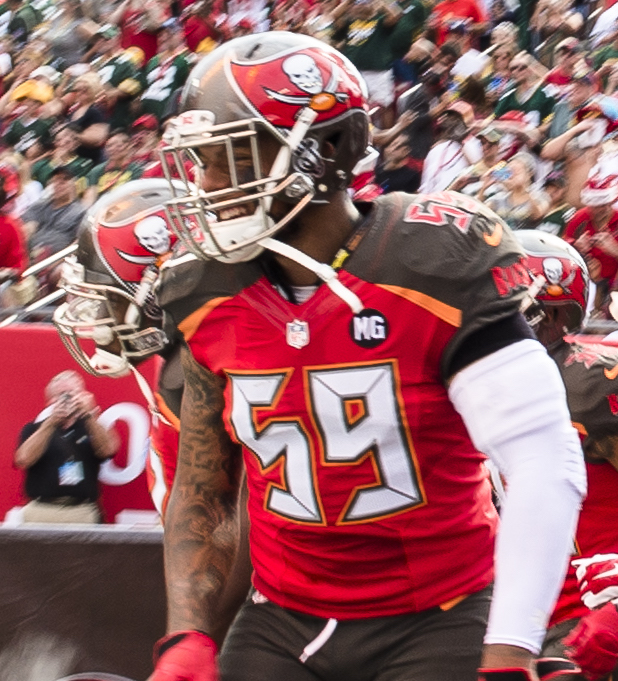
Foster during his time with the Buccaneers in 2014

Throughout training camp, Foster competed to be the starting middle linebacker against Tyrone McKenzie. His development and conversion to middle linebacker was delayed due to the 2011 NFL lockout. On August 24, 2011, Foster was fined $20,000 for a hit he delivered to Chad Ochocinco during the Buccaneers' 31–14 loss to the New England Patriots in their second preseason game. Ochocinco offered to pay the fine for him, as he disagreed with the league's decision, but the league stated that he would not be able to. Head coach Raheem Morris named Foster the starting middle linebacker to begin the regular season after he had an impressive showing during the preseason.

He made his professional regular season debut in the Tampa Bay Buccaneers' season-opener against the Detroit Lions and recorded seven combined tackles in their 27–20 loss. On September 18, 2011, Foster made his first career start and collected a season-high ten combined tackles (seven solo), forced a fumble, and made his first career sack during a 24–20 victory at the Minnesota Vikings in Week 2. Foster made his first career sack on Vikings' quarterback Donovan McNabb for a six-yard loss in the second quarter. In Week 14, he recorded six combined tackles, deflected a pass, and made his first career interception in the Buccaneers' 41–14 loss at the Jacksonville Jaguars. Foster made his first career interception off a pass by Jaguars' quarterback Blaine Gabbert, that was originally intended for tight end Marcedes Lewis, in the endzone to secure a touchback during the third quarter. He finished his rookie season in 2011 with 84 combined tackles (58 solo), two pass deflections, two sacks, a forced fumble, and an interception in 16 games and 15 starts.

==== 2012 ====
On January 2, 2012, the Tampa Bay Buccaneers fired head coach Raheem Morris after they finished the 2011 season with a 4–12 record. Foster entered training camp as the starting middle linebacker and saw competition from Adam Hayward after defensive coordinator Bill Sheridan chose to try Foster out as an outside linebacker. Head coach Greg Schiano named Foster the starting middle linebacker to begin the regular season, alongside outside linebackers Quincy Black and Lavonte David.

On September 16, 2012, Foster collected a season-high 13 combined tackles (12 solo), a pass deflection, and an interception during a 41–34 loss at the New York Giants in Week 2. Foster intercepted a pass by quarterback Eli Manning, that was intended for tight end Martellus Bennett, during the second quarter. In Week 17, he collected 12 combined tackles (11 solo) during a 22–17 win at the Atlanta Falcons. He started in all 16 games in 2012 and recorded 105 combined tackles (82 solo), two sacks, a pass deflection, and an interception.

==== 2013 ====
Foster returned as the starting middle linebacker to begin the regular season in 2013, alongside Lavonte David and Dekoda Watson. He started in the Tampa Bay Buccaneers' season-opener at the New York Jets and recorded eight combined tackles and two sacks in their 18–17 loss. He made two sacks on quarterback Geno Smith. On September 15, 2013, Foster made seven combined tackles, a season-high two pass deflections, and returned an interception for his first career touchdown during a 16–14 loss against the New Orleans Saints. Foster intercepted a pass by Saints' quarterback Drew Brees, which was originally intended for tight end Jimmy Graham, and returned it for an 85-yard touchdown in the fourth quarter. In Week 11, he recorded three combined tackles, broke up a pass, and returned an interception for a touchdown before exiting in the second quarter of the Buccaneers' 41–28 victory against the Atlanta Falcons after sustaining a concussion. Foster intercepted a pass by Falcons' quarterback Matt Ryan, that was intended for fullback Patrick DiMarco, and returned it for a 37-yard touchdown in the second quarter. Foster sustained a concussion after colliding with teammate Dashon Goldson and was inactive for the Buccaneers' Week 12 victory at the Detroit Lions. On December 1, 2013, Foster collected a season-high 11 combined tackles (five solo) during a 27–6 loss at the Carolina Panthers in Week 13. On December 30, 2013, the Tampa Bay Buccaneers fired head coach Greg Schiano after they finished the season with a 4–12 record. He finished the 2013 season with 92 combined tackles (63 solo), seven pass deflections, three pass deflections, two interceptions, two sacks, and two touchdowns in 15 games and 13 starts.

==== 2014 ====
Foster entered training camp slated as the starting middle linebacker. Head coach Lovie Smith named Foster the starting middle linebacker to begin the regular season, along with outside linebackers Lavonte David and Jonathan Casillas. Defensive coordinator Leslie Frazier implemented a defense that deployed the Tampa 2 which stressed the use of the middle linebacker in pass coverage. On September 14, 2014, Foster recorded two solo tackles before exiting in the second quarter of the Buccaneers' 17–14 loss to the Miami Dolphins after injuring his shoulder. He was inactive for three games (Weeks 3–5) after it was confirmed he had dislocated his shoulder. On November 9, 2014, he collected a season-high nine combined tackles during a 27–17 loss to the Atlanta Falcons in Week 10. He was inactive for two games (Weeks 14–15) after injuring his Achilles tendon. Foster was sidelined for the Buccaneers' Week 17 loss to the New Orleans Saints after aggravating his Achilles tendon injury. He finished the 2014 season with 62 combined tackles (40 solo) and two pass deflections in ten games and ten starts.

==== 2015 ====
Foster became an unrestricted free agent in 2015 and received interest from the Chicago Bears and San Francisco 49ers.

Buccaneers general manager Mark Dominik vouched for Foster during free agency:

"Mason is a tough, physical, smart inside linebacker. He sees plays develop. He plays downhill and he’s a very strong tackler at the point of impact. The good thing about Mason is not only can he play in the 4–3 as a Mike or a Sam, but he can play in the 3–4 at either middle linebacker spot. He has versatility to play for just about any defense in the league. I don’t think people realize how smart he is. He really does understand defenses. He can make the calls, get guys lined up. That’s a very valuable thing when you look at middle linebackers."

=== Chicago Bears ===
On March 24, 2015, the Chicago Bears signed Foster to a one-year, $825,000 contract that includes $250,000 guaranteed and a signing bonus of $80,000.

Defensive coordinator Vic Fangio held an open competition to name starting inside linebackers. Foster competed against Jon Bostic, Shea McClellin, Sam Acho, and Christian Jones. On September 4, 2015, the Chicago Bears waived Foster as part of their final roster cuts.

=== Washington Redskins ===
On September 29, 2015, the Washington Redskins signed Foster to a one-year, $745,000 contract. Head coach Jay Gruden named Foster the backup inside linebacker to start the regular season, behind Perry Riley and Keenan Robinson.

On December 7, 2015, Foster earned his first start of the season and recorded seven combined tackles during a 19–16 loss to the Dallas Cowboys on Monday Night Football. Foster started the last five games of the regular season (Weeks 13–17) after Perry Riley broke the fifth metatarsal in his foot and underwent surgery. In Week 16, he collected a season-high eight combined tackles in the Redskins' 38–24 win at the Philadelphia Eagles. He finished the 2015 season with 37 combined tackles (25 solo) in 13 games and five starts.

The Washington Redskins finished first in the NFC East with a 9–7 record and earned a wildcard berth. On January 10, 2016, Foster started in his first career playoff game and recorded nine combined tackles in the Redskins' 35–18 loss to the Green Bay Packers in the NFC Wildcard Game.

==== 2016 ====
On March 9, 2016, the Washington Redskins signed Foster to a two-year, $2.50 million contract with a signing bonus of $350,000.

Throughout training camp, Foster competed against Perry Riley to be the starting inside linebacker. Head coach Jay Gruden named Foster and Will Compton the starting inside linebackers to begin the regular season in 2016, along with outside linebackers Ryan Kerrigan and Preston Smith.

He started in the Washington Redskins' season-opener against the Pittsburgh Steelers and recorded 14 combined tackles (nine solo) in their 38–16 loss. On January 1, 2017, Foster collected a career-high 17 combined tackles (15 solo) during a 19–10 loss to the New York Giants in Week 17. He finished the 2016 season with 124 combined tackles (89 solo), three pass deflections, and a sack in 16 games and 13 starts.

==== 2017 ====
On January 5, 2017, the Washington Redskins fired defensive coordinator Joe Barry. During training camp, Foster competed to be a starting inside linebacker against Will Compton. Head coach Jay Gruden named Foster and Zach Brown the starting inside linebackers to begin the regular season, along with outside linebackers Ryan Kerrigan and Preston Smith.

External videos
- Mason Foster intercepts Jared Goff to sea the game
- Foster recovers fumble on bad pass by Carson Wentz

He started in the Washington Redskins' season-opener against the Philadelphia Eagles and collected a season-high nine combined tackles and recovered a Carson Wentz fumble in the first quarter of their 30–17 loss. On September 17, 2017, Foster made six combined tackles, a pass deflection, and intercepted a pass by Rams' quarterback Jared Goff late in the fourth quarter of the 27–20 victory at the Los Angeles Rams in Week 2. He was inactive during the Redskins' Week 3 victory against the Oakland Raiders due to a shoulder injury. On October 28, 2017, the Washington Redskins officially placed Foster on injured reserve due to a torn labrum he sustained in Week 2. He finished the season with 31 combined tackles (22 solo), a pass deflection, an interception, and was credited with half a sack in five games and four starts.

==== 2018 ====
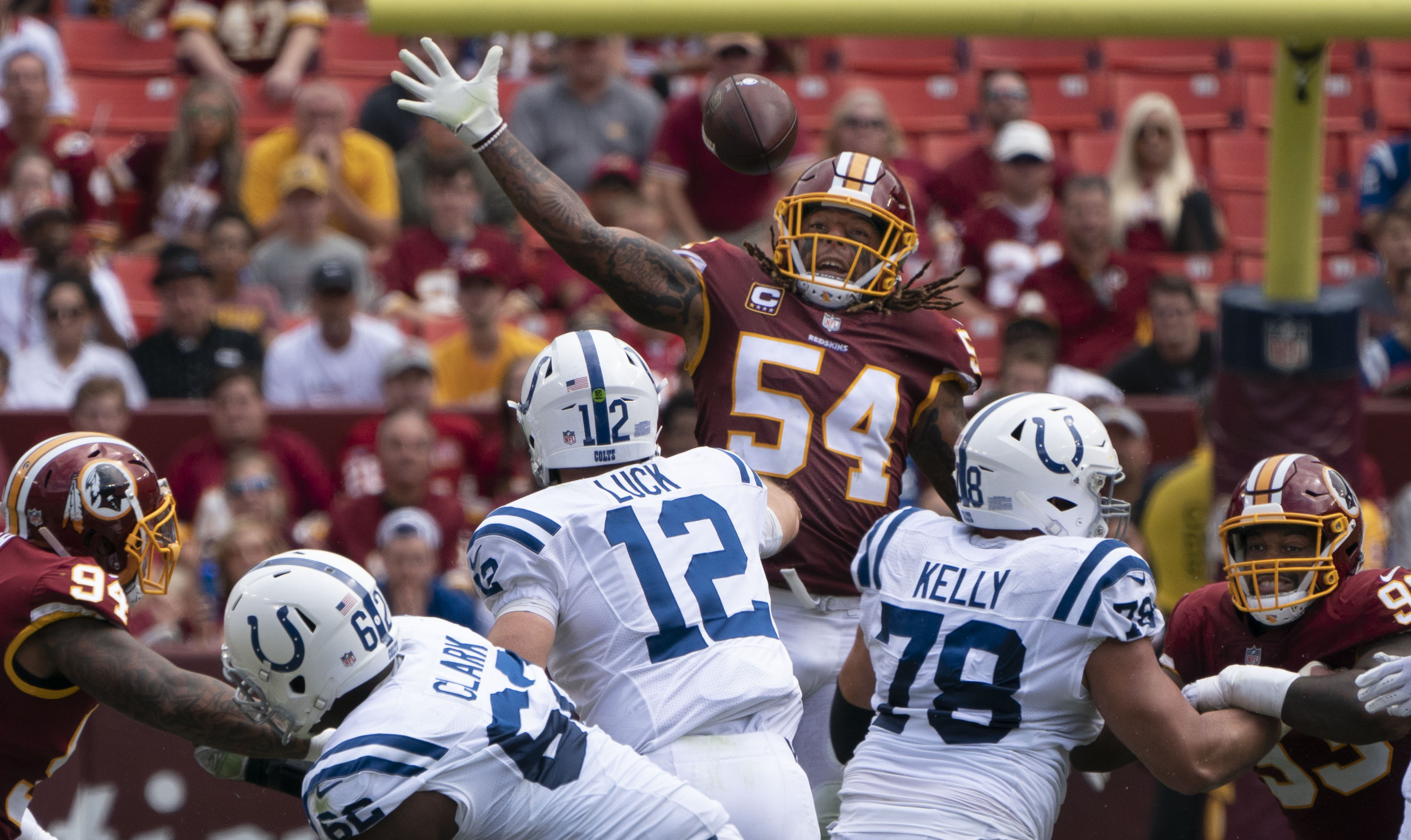
Foster (#54) in a game against the Indianapolis Colts in 2018

On January 25, 2018, Foster signed a two-year, $3.4 million contract. In Week 8, Foster collected a season-high 13 combined tackles (nine solo) during a 20–13 win at the New York Giants. Foster started in all 16 games in 2018, and recorded a career-high 131 combined tackles (81 solo), four pass deflections, two interceptions, and a sack. Foster was released by the team on July 23, 2019.

== NFL career statistics ==
Legend
	Led the league
**Bold**	Career high

=== Regular season ===
Year	Team	Games		Tackles					Interceptions					Fumbles			
Year	Team	GP	GS	Cmb	Solo	Ast	Sck	TFL	Int	Yds	TD	Lng	PD	FF	FR	Yds	TD
2011	TAM	**16**	15	84	58	26	**2.0**	5	1	0	0	0	2	**1**	**1**	0	0
2012	TAM	**16**	**16**	106	82	24	**2.0**	**13**	1	0	0	0	1	0	**1**	**4**	0
2013	TAM	15	13	92	63	29	**2.0**	6	**3**	**122**	**2**	**85**	**7**	**1**	0	0	0
2014	TAM	10	10	62	40	22	0.0	2	0	0	0	0	2	0	0	0	0
2015	WAS	13	5	37	25	12	0.0	1	0	0	0	0	0	**1**	**1**	0	0
2016	WAS	**16**	13	124	**89**	35	1.0	9	0	0	0	0	3	**1**	0	0	0
2017	WAS	5	4	31	22	9	0.5	1	1	10	0	10	1	0	**1**	0	0
2018	WAS	**16**	**16**	**131**	81	**50**	1.0	4	2	4	0	4	4	0	**1**	0	0
Career		107	92	667	460	207	8.5	41	8	136	2	85	20	4	5	4	0

=== Playoffs ===
Year	Team	Games		Tackles					Interceptions					Fumbles			
Year	Team	GP	GS	Cmb	Solo	Ast	Sck	TFL	Int	Yds	TD	Lng	PD	FF	FR	Yds	TD
2015	WAS	**1**	**1**	**9**	**6**	**3**	0.0	**2**	0	0	0	0	0	0	0	0	0
		1	1	9	6	3	0.0	2	0	0	0	0	0	0	0	0	0

== See also ==
- Washington Huskies football statistical leaders
