= Aiken High School =

Aiken High School may refer to:

== Aiken, South Carolina ==
- Aiken High School (South Carolina)
- South Aiken High School

== Cincinnati, Ohio ==
- Aiken High School (Cincinnati)
