= Collin Franklin =

American football player (born 1988)

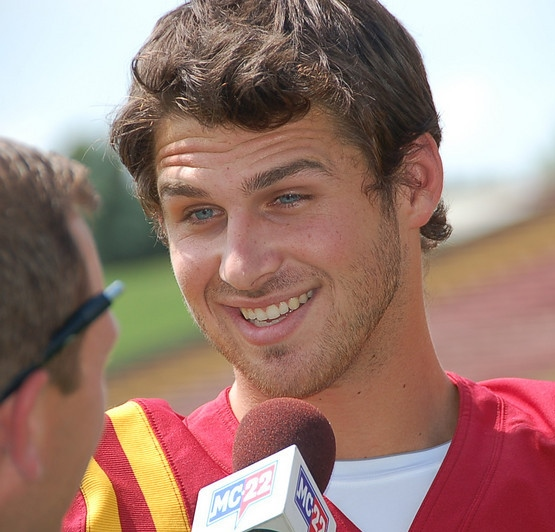

No. 85
- Position: Tight end

Personal information
- Born: July 20, 1988 (age 38); Los Angeles, California
- Listed height: 6 ft 6 in (1.98 m)
- Listed weight: 256 lb (116 kg)

Career information
- High school: Simi Valley (CA)
- College: Canyons (2006); Iowa State (2007–2010)
- NFL draft: 2011: undrafted

Career history
- New York Jets (2011)*; Tampa Bay Buccaneers (2011); Lisboa Devils (2015)
- * Offseason or practice squad member only

Awards and highlights
- Second-team All-Big 12 (2010)
- Stats at Pro Football Reference

Collin Charles Franklin (born July 20, 1988) is an American former football tight end. He was signed by the New York Jets as an undrafted free agent in 2011. He played college football at Iowa State. He currently play for the Portuguese team Lisboa Devils and produces music.
