= Zack Pianalto =

American football player (born 1989)

No. 80
- Position: Tight end

Personal information
- Born: May 27, 1989 (age 37); Springdale, Arkansas, U.S.
- Listed height: 6 ft 4 in (1.93 m)
- Listed weight: 250 lb (113 kg)

Career information
- High school: Springdale
- College: North Carolina
- NFL draft: 2011: undrafted

Career history
- Buffalo Bills (2011)*; Tampa Bay Buccaneers (2011); Pittsburgh Steelers (2013)*; Carolina Panthers (2013)*
- * Offseason or practice squad member only

Career NFL statistics
- Receptions: 4
- Receiving yards: 40
- Stats at Pro Football Reference

Zack Pianalto (born May 27, 1989) is an American former professional football player who was a tight end in the National Football League (NFL). He was signed by the Buffalo Bills as an undrafted free agent in 2011. He played with the Tampa Bay Buccaneers in 2011 and 2012. He was a member of the Pittsburgh Steelers for part of the 2013 offseason. He played college football for the North Carolina Tar Heels.

== Professional career ==
Pianalto was an undrafted player out of University of North Carolina at Chapel Hill and was signed onto the Buffalo Bills 90-man roster and made the initial 53-man roster before being cut a day later. On September 5, 2011, Pianalto was claimed by the Tampa Bay Buccaneers, given jersey number 80, and was the third tight end on the depth chart. After a decent 2011 season he did not play in 2012 and was cut following the regular season. Soon after, he was signed to the Pittsburgh Steelers Reserve/Future squad along with kicker Daniel Hrapmann. He was released from the team in June 2013.

On July 30, 2013, Pianalto was signed by the Carolina Panthers. He was released from the team August 2013.
