= Devin Holland =

American football player (born 1988)

No. 30
- Position: Safety

Personal information
- Born: October 18, 1988 (age 38); Baton Rouge, Louisiana, U.S.
- Listed height: 6 ft 0 in (1.83 m)
- Listed weight: 205 lb (93 kg)

Career information
- High school: Istrouma (LA)
- College: McNeese State
- NFL draft: 2011: undrafted

Career history
- Tampa Bay Buccaneers (2011); Washington Redskins (2013)*
- * Offseason or practice squad member only

Career NFL statistics
- Games played: 4
- Total tackles: 2
- Stats at Pro Football Reference

Devin Holland (born October 18, 1988) is an American former professional football player who was a safety in the National Football League (NFL). He was signed by the Tampa Bay Buccaneers as an undrafted free agent in 2011. He played college football for McNeese State University and Tulane University prior.

== Professional career ==
=== Tampa Bay Buccaneers ===
Holland was signed as an undrafted free agent with the Tampa Bay Buccaneers on July 26, 2011. During the 2011 preseason, he was given two fines one for $5,000 and the other for $10,000.

The Buccaneers released him on July 26, 2012.

=== Washington Redskins ===
Holland was signed to a futures contract by the Washington Redskins on January 3, 2013. The Redskins released him on July 25, 2013.
