= South Aiken High School =

Location
- 232 East Pine Log Road; Aiken, South Carolina 29803; United States
- Coordinates: 33°31′34″N 81°42′42″W

Information
- Type: Public high school
- Established: 1980 (46 years ago)
- School district: Aiken County Public Schools, Area 1
- CEEB code: 410026
- Principal: Samuel Fuller
- Staff: 80.00 (FTE)
- Grades: 9–12
- Enrollment: 1,305 (2023-2024)
- Student to teacher ratio: 16.31
- Campus size: 50 acres (200,000 m^{2})
- Campus type: Suburban
- Colors: Garnet and gold
- Mascot: Thoroughbred
- Yearbook: Winner's Circle
- Website: www.acpsd.net/o/sahs

South Aiken High School is a four-year public high school located in Aiken, South Carolina, United States. It is a part of the Aiken County Public School District.

== Athletics ==
=== State championships ===
- Basketball - Girls: 1985, 1988
- Golf - Boys: 1987, 1990, 2000, 2001, 2004, 2012, 2013
- Soccer - Boys: 2009
- Soccer - Girls: 2017, 2019
- Swimming - Girls: 2016
- Tennis - Boys: 1998, 1999, 2000, 2013, 2017
- Tennis - Girls: 1985, 1986, 1995, 1997
- Volleyball - Girls: 2023

== Notable alumni ==
- Michael Dean Perry – National Football League (NFL) defensive tackle
- Dekoda Watson – NFL linebacker
- Kevin Kisner – PGA Tour Golfer
