= Kregg Lumpkin =

American football player (born 1984)

No. 28, 38
- Position: Running back

Personal information
- Born: May 15, 1984 (age 42); Albany, Georgia, U.S.
- Listed height: 6 ft 1 in (1.85 m)
- Listed weight: 228 lb (103 kg)

Career information
- High school: Stephenson (Stone Mountain, Georgia)
- College: Georgia
- NFL draft: 2008: undrafted

Career history
- Green Bay Packers (2008–2009); Tampa Bay Buccaneers (2010–2011); Seattle Seahawks (2012); New York Giants (2012)

Career NFL statistics
- Rushing attempts: 42
- Rushing yards: 166
- Receptions: 45
- Receiving yards: 325
- Stats at Pro Football Reference

Kregg Lumpkin (born May 15, 1984) is an American former professional football player who was a running back in the National Football League (NFL). He was signed by the Green Bay Packers as an undrafted free agent in 2008. He played college football for the Georgia Bulldogs.

Lumpkin also played for the Tampa Bay Buccaneers and New York Giants.

== College career ==
A highly recruited tailback prospect (#2 by Scout and Rivals.com, behind only Reggie Bush), Lumpkin played at the University of Georgia from 2003 to 2007. Slowed down by injuries during his sophomore and senior seasons along with sharing carries with Michael Cooper, Thomas Brown, Danny Ware, and Knowshon Moreno, Lumpkin rushed for 1,699 yards on 352 carries with 17 total touchdowns (14 rushing, 3 receiving) in his career. His jersey number as a true freshman was #28, but he changed it during his redshirt sophomore season to #6.

== Professional career ==
=== Green Bay Packers ===
He was signed by the Green Bay Packers as an undrafted free agent in 2008. He made the regular season roster after an impressive training camp. He was placed on injured reserve on October 11. He was released on September 5, 2009 after final cuts and re-signed to the practice squad the following day. On January 11, 2010, he signed a reserve future contract.

Lumpkin was released on September 4, 2010.

=== Tampa Bay Buccaneers ===
On September 5, 2010, Lumpkin was claimed off waivers by the Tampa Bay Buccaneers.

=== Seattle Seahawks ===
Lumpkin signed with the Seattle Seahawks on March 23, 2012. He was waived on September 18.

=== New York Giants ===
Lumpkin signed with the New York Giants on November 27, 2012.

== Post-football career ==
Lumpkin is now the Deputy Chief of Operations for Newton County Fire Department in Newton County, Georgia.
