= Adam Hayward =

American football player (born 1984)

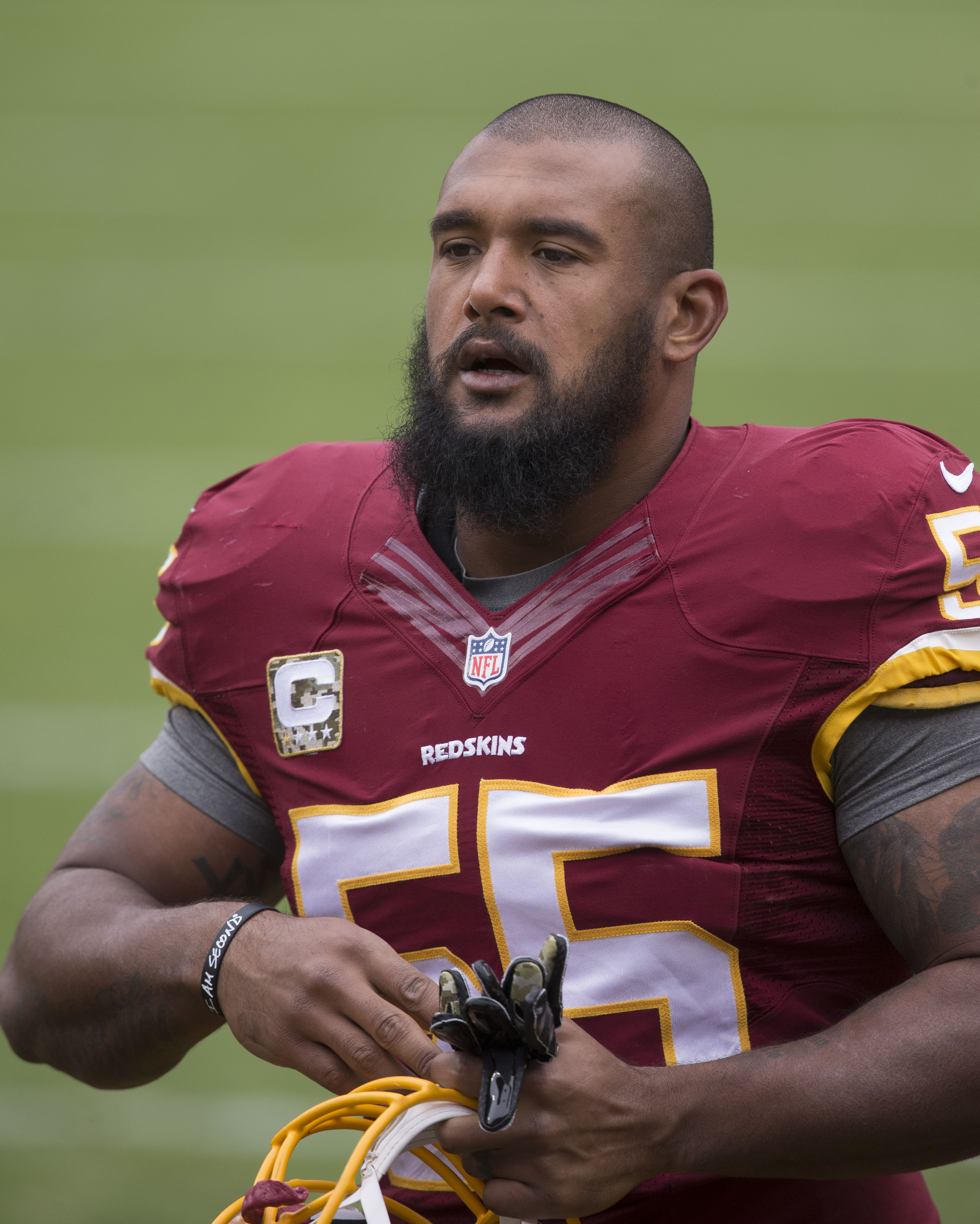
- Hayward with the Washington Redskins in 2014

No. 55, 57
- Position: Linebacker

Personal information
- Born: June 23, 1984 (age 42); Westminster, California, U.S.
- Listed height: 6 ft 0 in (1.83 m)
- Listed weight: 235 lb (107 kg)

Career information
- High school: Huntington Beach (CA) Marina
- College: Portland State
- NFL draft: 2007: 6th round, 184th overall pick

Career history
- Tampa Bay Buccaneers (2007–2013); Washington Redskins (2014–2015)

Career NFL statistics
- Total tackles: 176
- Sacks: 1
- Fumble recoveries: 2
- Stats at Pro Football Reference

Adam Hayward (born June 23, 1984) is an American former professional football player who was a linebacker in the National Football League (NFL). He was selected by the Tampa Bay Buccaneers in the sixth round of the 2007 NFL draft. He played college football for the Portland State Vikings. After his professional football days, he was a Firefighter/EMT in Florida.

== Early life ==
A linebacker at Marina High School, Adam was unnerved by the idea of playing the position of Safety for Colorado State University, He took a year off from football at Colorado to take care of some family issues. Eventually, he found his place starting as an outside linebacker for Portland State University under Tim Walsh.

== Professional career ==
=== Tampa Bay Buccaneers ===
Hayward was selected by the Tampa Bay Buccaneers in the sixth round (184th pick) of the 2007 NFL draft.

=== Washington Redskins ===
On March 10, 2014, Hayward signed a three-year deal with the Washington Redskins. He was placed on injured reserve due to a tibial plateau fracture in his right leg on November 24. He suffered the fracture after jumping to catch the ball during a punt in the Week 12 game against the San Francisco 49ers.

Hayward tore one of his ACLs in the second 2015 preseason games against the Detroit Lions. On August 22, 2015, the Redskins placed him on injured reserve for the second time in a row.

Hayward was released on July 22, 2016.

== NFL career statistics ==
Legend
**Bold**	Career high

=== Regular season ===
Year	Team	Games		Tackles					Interceptions					Fumbles			
Year	Team	GP	GS	Cmb	Solo	Ast	Sck	TFL	Int	Yds	TD	Lng	PD	FF	FR	Yds	TD
2007	TAM	12	0	15	12	3	0.0	0	0	0	0	0	0	0	0	0	0
2008	TAM	**16**	0	13	11	2	0.0	0	0	0	0	0	0	0	0	0	0
2009	TAM	15	1	23	19	4	0.0	0	0	0	0	0	0	0	0	0	0
2010	TAM	**16**	3	29	22	**7**	**1.0**	**3**	0	0	0	0	**2**	0	**2**	0	0
2011	TAM	**16**	2	**33**	**29**	4	0.0	2	0	0	0	0	0	0	0	0	0
2012	TAM	**16**	**5**	24	18	6	0.0	1	0	0	0	0	**2**	0	0	0	0
2013	TAM	**16**	2	26	19	**7**	0.0	1	0	0	0	0	1	0	0	0	0
2014	WAS	11	0	13	9	4	0.0	0	0	0	0	0	0	0	0	0	0
		118	13	176	139	37	1.0	7	0	0	0	0	5	0	2	0	0

=== Playoffs ===
Year	Team	Games		Tackles					Interceptions					Fumbles			
Year	Team	GP	GS	Cmb	Solo	Ast	Sck	TFL	Int	Yds	TD	Lng	PD	FF	FR	Yds	TD
2007	TAM	**1**	0	0	0	0	0.0	0	0	0	0	0	0	0	0	0	0
		1	0	0	0	0	0.0	0	0	0	0	0	0	0	0	0	0
