= Dekoda Watson =

American football player (born 1988)

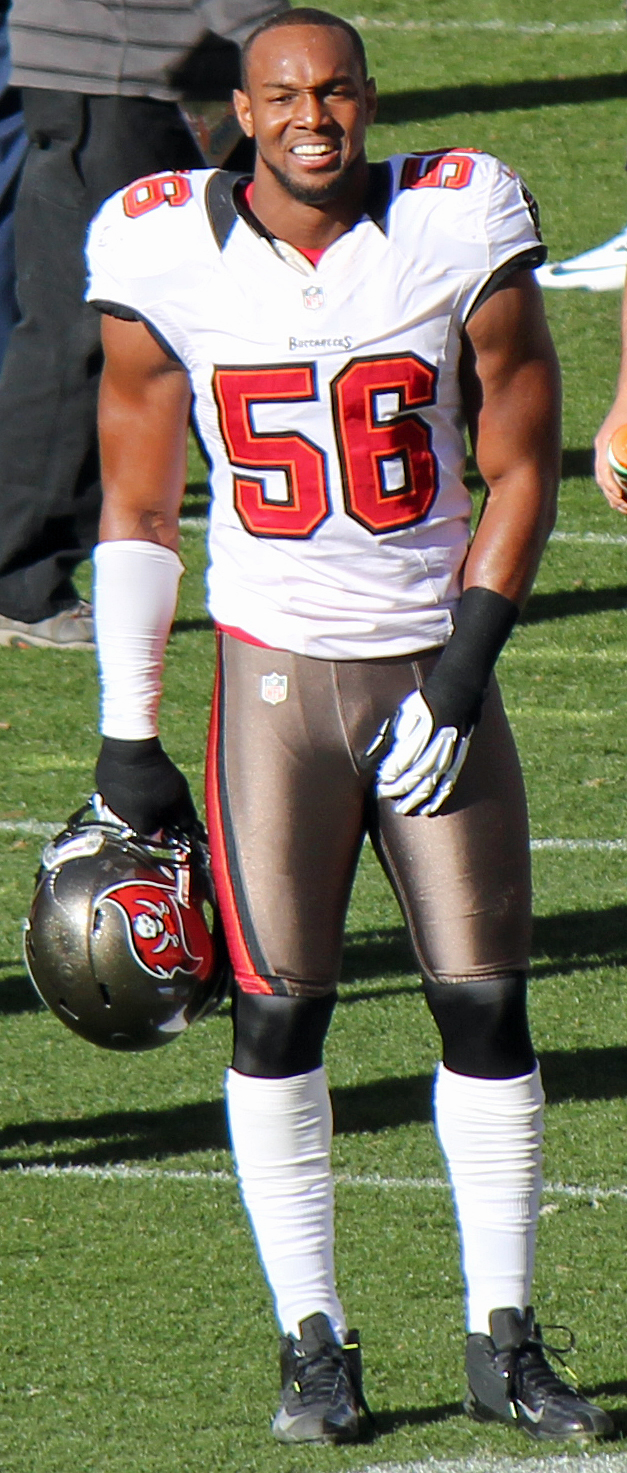
- Watson with the Tampa Bay Buccaneers in 2010

No. 56, 57, 53, 97, 51
- Position: Linebacker

Personal information
- Born: March 3, 1988 (age 38); Aiken, South Carolina, U.S.
- Listed height: 6 ft 2 in (1.88 m)
- Listed weight: 245 lb (111 kg)

Career information
- High school: South Aiken
- College: Florida State
- NFL draft: 2010: 7th round, 217th overall pick

Career history
- Tampa Bay Buccaneers (2010–2013); Jacksonville Jaguars (2014); Dallas Cowboys (2014); New England Patriots (2015); Denver Broncos (2016); San Francisco 49ers (2017–2018); Denver Broncos (2019)*; Seattle Seahawks (2019)
- * Offseason or practice squad member only

Awards and highlights
- Second-team All-ACC (2009)

Career NFL statistics
- Total tackles: 153
- Sacks: 6.0
- Forced fumbles: 4
- Fumble recoveries: 4
- Interceptions: 1
- Defensive touchdowns: 1
- Stats at Pro Football Reference

Dekoda Watson (born March 3, 1988) is an American former professional football player who was a linebacker in the National Football League (NFL). He was selected by the Tampa Bay Buccaneers in the seventh round of the 2010 NFL draft. He played college football for the Florida State Seminoles.

== Early life ==
Watson attended South Aiken High School in Aiken, South Carolina, where he was a letterman in football and track. In high school football, he recorded 123 tackles, 32 tackles for loss and 11 sacks as a senior, earning him all-state honors by SCVarsity.com and all-southern team by the Orlando Sentinel. In his junior season, he registered 102 tackles, 29 tackles for loss and 18 sacks from the defensive end position. Watson was named Defensive MVP after recording nine tackles and a sack for the South Carolina team in the annual North Carolina–South Carolina Shrine Bowl.

In track & field, Watson was an standout athlete as sprinter/jumper. At the 2006 Region 4-4A, he captured two state titles, winning the triple jump with a leap of 42 ft 10 in (13.10 m), and running the lead leg on the South Aiken 4 × 100 m relay, helping them win the event with a time of 42.59 seconds. In addition, he also earned a second-place finish in the 100-meter dash, with a PR time of 11.07 seconds.

Considered a three-star recruit by Rivals.com, Watson was listed as the No. 25 outside linebacker in the nation. He chose Florida State over South Carolina, Tennessee, and Virginia Tech.

== College career ==
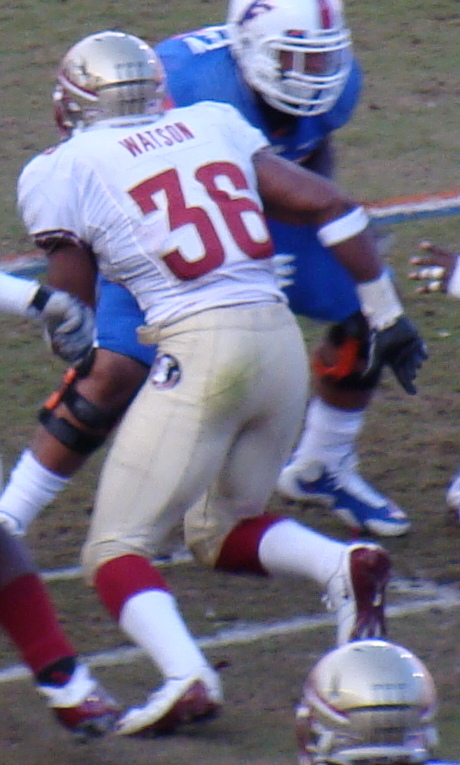
Watson with Florida State in 2009

In his initial year at Florida State, Watson played in 12 games and earned one starting assignment at the weakside linebacker position against Boston College, stepping in for the injured Geno Hayes. He totaled 23 tackles to finish second on the team among first year players (second to Myron Rolle) in total tackles, and earned All-ACC Freshman Team honors by The Sporting News.

As a sophomore, Watson started all 12 games during the regular season at the strong side linebacker position and ranked fifth on the team with a single-season career-high 50 tackles. In his junior year, he ranked fourth among Seminoles defenders with 46 tackles.

== Professional career ==
Pre-draft measurables
Height	Weight	Arm length	Hand span	40-yard dash	10-yard split	20-yard split	20-yard shuttle	Three-cone drill	Vertical jump	Broad jump	Bench press
6 ft 1 3/8 in (1.86 m)	240 lb (109 kg)	32 3/4 in (0.83 m)	8 3/4 in (0.22 m)	4.40 s	1.54 s	2.60 s	4.11 s	6.82 s	40.0 in (1.02 m)	11 ft 2 in (3.40 m)	24 reps
All values from NFL Combine/FSU Pro Day

=== Tampa Bay Buccaneers ===
Watson was selected by the Tampa Bay Buccaneers in the seventh round of the 2010 NFL draft. Watson was signed to a four-year contract on June 18, 2010.

=== Jacksonville Jaguars ===
Watson signed with the Jacksonville Jaguars on March 12, 2014. He was waived on November 11, 2014.

=== Dallas Cowboys ===
Watson signed with the Dallas Cowboys on November 13, 2014, just four days after playing against them as a member of the Jacksonville Jaguars. He was released on May 8, 2015.

=== New England Patriots ===
Watson signed with the New England Patriots on May 12, 2015. On August 31, 2015, the Patriots released Watson.

On September 16, 2015, the Patriots re-signed Watson. They released him again on September 30, 2015.

Watson was once again signed by the Patriots on December 29, 2015.

=== Denver Broncos (first stint) ===
On May 16, 2016, Watson signed with the Denver Broncos.

=== San Francisco 49ers ===
On March 17, 2017, Watson signed a three-year deal worth $6 million with the San Francisco 49ers.

On September 8, 2018, Watson was placed on injured reserve with a hamstring injury. He was activated off injured reserve to the active roster on November 1, 2018. On December 5, 2018, Watson was placed on injured reserve for the second time in a year with a calf injury.

=== Denver Broncos (second stint) ===
On April 27, 2019, the 49ers traded Watson, along with a sixth round draft pick, to the Broncos in exchange for a fifth round pick. He was released on August 26, 2019.

=== Seattle Seahawks ===
On October 30, 2019, Watson was signed by the Seattle Seahawks, but was released two days later. On December 18, 2019, Watson was signed for the second time by the Seattle Seahawks.

== NFL career statistics ==
Legend
**Bold**	Career high

=== Regular season ===
Year	Team	Games		Tackles					Interceptions					Fumbles			
Year	Team	GP	GS	Cmb	Solo	Ast	Sck	TFL	Int	Yds	TD	Lng	PD	FF	FR	Yds	TD
2010	TAM	15	1	31	26	5	0.0	1	0	0	0	0	1	0	0	0	0
2011	TAM	14	2	23	21	2	1.0	2	0	0	0	0	**2**	**1**	1	**7**	**1**
2012	TAM	**16**	0	10	8	2	0.0	0	0	0	0	0	0	0	**2**	0	0
2013	TAM	15	**3**	**42**	**33**	**9**	**2.0**	**5**	**1**	0	0	0	1	**1**	1	0	0
2014	JAX	9	1	14	9	5	0.0	0	0	0	0	0	0	0	0	0	0
2014	DAL	1	0	0	0	0	0.0	0	0	0	0	0	0	0	0	0	0
2015	NWE	3	0	2	2	0	0.0	0	0	0	0	0	0	0	0	0	0
2016	DEN	**16**	0	17	13	4	1.0	1	0	0	0	0	0	**1**	0	0	0
2017	SFO	14	0	8	6	2	0.0	0	0	0	0	0	0	0	0	0	0
2018	SFO	4	0	6	4	2	**2.0**	1	0	0	0	0	0	**1**	0	0	0
2019	SEA	1	0	0	0	0	0.0	0	0	0	0	0	0	0	0	0	0
		108	7	153	122	31	6.0	10	1	0	0	0	4	4	4	7	1

=== Playoffs ===
Year	Team	Games		Tackles					Interceptions					Fumbles			
Year	Team	GP	GS	Cmb	Solo	Ast	Sck	TFL	Int	Yds	TD	Lng	PD	FF	FR	Yds	TD
2014	DAL	**2**	0	1	**1**	0	0.0	0	0	0	0	0	0	0	0	0	0
2015	NWE	**2**	0	**2**	0	**2**	0.0	0	0	0	0	0	0	0	0	0	0
2019	SEA	**2**	0	0	0	0	0.0	0	0	0	0	0	0	0	0	0	0
		6	0	3	1	2	0.0	0	0	0	0	0	0	0	0	0	0
