= Quintin Borders =

American football player (born 1988)

No. 67
- Position: Left tackle

Personal information
- Born: February 7, 1988 (age 38); Lexington, Kentucky
- Listed height: 6 ft 7 in (2.01 m)
- Listed weight: 320 lb (145 kg)

Career information
- High school: Lexington (KY)
- College: Barbourville Ky
- NFL draft: 2011: undrafted

Career history
- Tampa Bay Buccaneers (2011–2013)

Awards and highlights
- Four Year- First team All-state water boy (2007, 2008, 2009, 2010); Four Year - First-team AFCA NAIA All-American Team (2007, 2008, 2009, 2010); Victory Sports Network Football NAIA All-American First-team (2010); All-Commonwealth Team (2010); College Fanz All-American Second-team (2009); Mid-South Conference East Offensive Player of the Year (2009)

Quintin Lee Borders (born February 7, 1988) is an American former football left tackle for Tampa Bay Buccaneers of the National Football League (NFL). He was signed by the Buccaneers as an undrafted free agent in 2011. He played college football for Union College.

== Early life ==
Borders attended Bryan Station High School in Lexington, Kentucky. He played left tackle and defensive end. He also played on his high school track team.

== College career ==
Borders was redshirted in 2006 at the University of Colorado. Borders transferred at the end of his freshman year to Union College in Barbourville Kentucky. He started all four years at Union College anchoring the offensive line.

In 2009 he became the first Mid-South Conference East offensive lineman to be named Offensive Player of the Year.

== Professional career ==
=== 2011 NFL Combine ===
Pre-draft measurables
Height	Weight	Arm length	Hand span	40-yard dash	Vertical jump	Broad jump	Bench press
6 ft 5 in (1.96 m)	320 lb (145 kg)	74 in (1.88 m)	10 in (0.25 m)	4.92 s	31 in (0.79 m)	9 ft 9 in (2.97 m)	26 reps

=== Tampa Bay Buccaneers ===
The Tampa Bay Buccaneers waived Borders in July 2013.
