= Raheem Morris =

American football coach (born 1976)

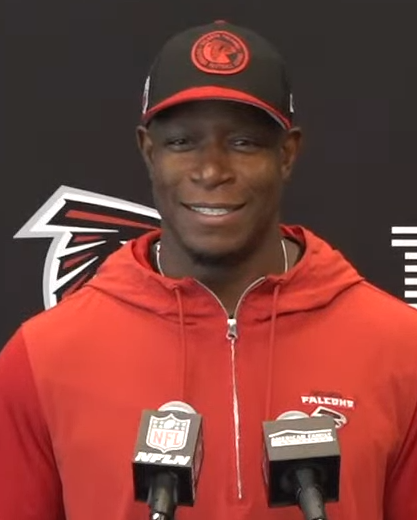
- Morris with the Atlanta Falcons in 2024

San Francisco 49ers
- Title: Defensive coordinator

Personal information
- Born: September 3, 1976 (age 50); Newark, New Jersey, U.S.

Career information
- Position: Safety
- High school: Irvington (Irvington, New Jersey)
- College: Hofstra (1994–1997)

Career history
- Hofstra (1998) Graduate assistant; Cornell (1999) Defensive backs coach; Hofstra (2000–2001) Defensive backs coach; Tampa Bay Buccaneers (2002–2005); Defensive quality control coach (2002); Defensive assistant (2003); Assistant defensive backs coach (2004–2005); Kansas State (2006) Defensive coordinator; Tampa Bay Buccaneers (2007–2011); Defensive backs coach (2007–2008); Head coach (2009–2011); Washington Redskins (2012–2014) Defensive backs coach; Atlanta Falcons (2015–2020); Assistant head coach & defensive pass game coordinator (2015); Assistant head coach & wide receivers coach (2016); Assistant head coach, wide receivers coach & offensive pass game coordinator (2017); Assistant head coach & offensive pass game coordinator (2018); Assistant head coach, defensive backs coach & wide receivers coach (2019); Defensive coordinator & interim head coach (2020); Los Angeles Rams (2021–2023) Defensive coordinator; Atlanta Falcons (2024–2025) Head coach; San Francisco 49ers (2026–present) Defensive coordinator

Awards and highlights
- As an assistant coach: 2× Super Bowl champion (XXXVII, LVI)

Head coaching record
- Regular season: 37–56 (.398)
- Coaching profile at Pro Football Reference

Dejohnold Raheem Morris (born September 3, 1976) is an American professional football coach who is the defensive coordinator for the San Francisco 49ers of the National Football League (NFL). He most recently was the head coach for the Atlanta Falcons from 2024 to 2025. Morris also previously served as the head coach of the Tampa Bay Buccaneers from 2009 to 2011, as interim head coach of the Falcons in 2020, and as an assistant coach for the Kansas State Wildcats, Washington Redskins, and Los Angeles Rams, with which he won Super Bowl LVI.

== Early years ==
Morris graduated from Hofstra University with a degree in Physical Education in 1998 after playing safety at Hofstra from 1994 to 1997.

== Coaching career ==
=== Early career ===
In 1997, Morris began his collegiate coaching career as a graduate assistant at Hofstra University, being responsible for coaching the offensive scout team, developing scouting reports and handling video breakdown and computer input and analysis. Two years later, Morris was hired by Cornell University as their defensive backs coach and special teams assistant. The following year, he returned to Hofstra as defensive backs coach. Morris spent time in 2001 as an intern with the New York Jets.

=== Tampa Bay Buccaneers ===
Before the 2002 season, Morris was hired by the Buccaneers to become their defensive quality control coach, where he helped them have the top-ranked defense and win the franchise's first ever Super Bowl, beating the Oakland Raiders 48–21 in Super Bowl XXXVII. In 2003, Morris became a defensive assistant. From 2004 to 2005, he was the assistant defensive backs coach. After 2005, Morris went to Kansas State to be their defensive coordinator.

=== Kansas State ===
Morris spent one season with the Kansas State Wildcats in 2006, as defensive coordinator under then-head coach Ron Prince. Morris helped the defense in several statistical categories including total defense, scoring defense and pass defense, and aided the Wildcats in their upset of the #4 Texas Longhorns during the 2006 season.

=== Tampa Bay Buccaneers (second stint) ===
Before the 2007 season, Morris returned to the Buccaneers to be their defensive backs coach, replacing Greg Burns. After the team's pass defense fell to 19th in 2006, Morris helped the pass defense achieve the league's top ranking in 2007.

==== Head coach ====
In December 2008, it was announced that Morris would take over as defensive coordinator for the Buccaneers for the 2009 season after Monte Kiffin announced that he would be leaving the team to join his son, Lane, at Tennessee. A month later, on January 16, 2009, head coach Jon Gruden was fired by the Buccaneers and Morris was named the team's head coach. Morris had also interviewed for head coach with the Denver Broncos before being hired by Tampa Bay.

After starting the season 0–7, Morris earned his first victory as a head coach in Week 9 against the Green Bay Packers. On November 24, 2009, Morris took over as defensive coordinator after Jim Bates was fired. He finished his first year as the head coach, leading the team to last in the NFC South with a 3–13 record. In his second season, the team finished 10–6, barely missing the playoffs. That seven-game turnaround was the best in franchise history. In 2010, Morris became the first coach since the 1970 NFL/AFL merger to start at least 10 rookies and finish with a winning record.

During Week 13 of the 2011 NFL season, against the Carolina Panthers, Morris banished defensive tackle Brian Price to the sideline after Price shoved Panthers guard Mackenzy Bernadeau well after the end of a third quarter play in which Cam Newton was sacked for a four-yard loss. Price was penalized for unnecessary roughness. Morris was incensed because the sack would have forced the Panthers into a 3rd-and-14 situation. However, the resulting 15-yard penalty gave the Panthers a first down, allowing them to complete a touchdown drive that put the game out of reach (the Panthers won 38–19). After the game, a visibly angry Morris called Price's actions "foolish" and "selfish." The move drew comparisons to then San Francisco 49ers coach Mike Singletary banishing Vernon Davis from the sideline after a personal foul in 2008.

On January 2, 2012, Morris was fired as head coach of the Buccaneers after a 4–12 season, including losing their last 10 games.

=== Washington Redskins ===
On January 11, 2012, Morris was hired by the Washington Redskins as their defensive backs coach, a position he held until the end of the 2014 season.

=== Atlanta Falcons ===
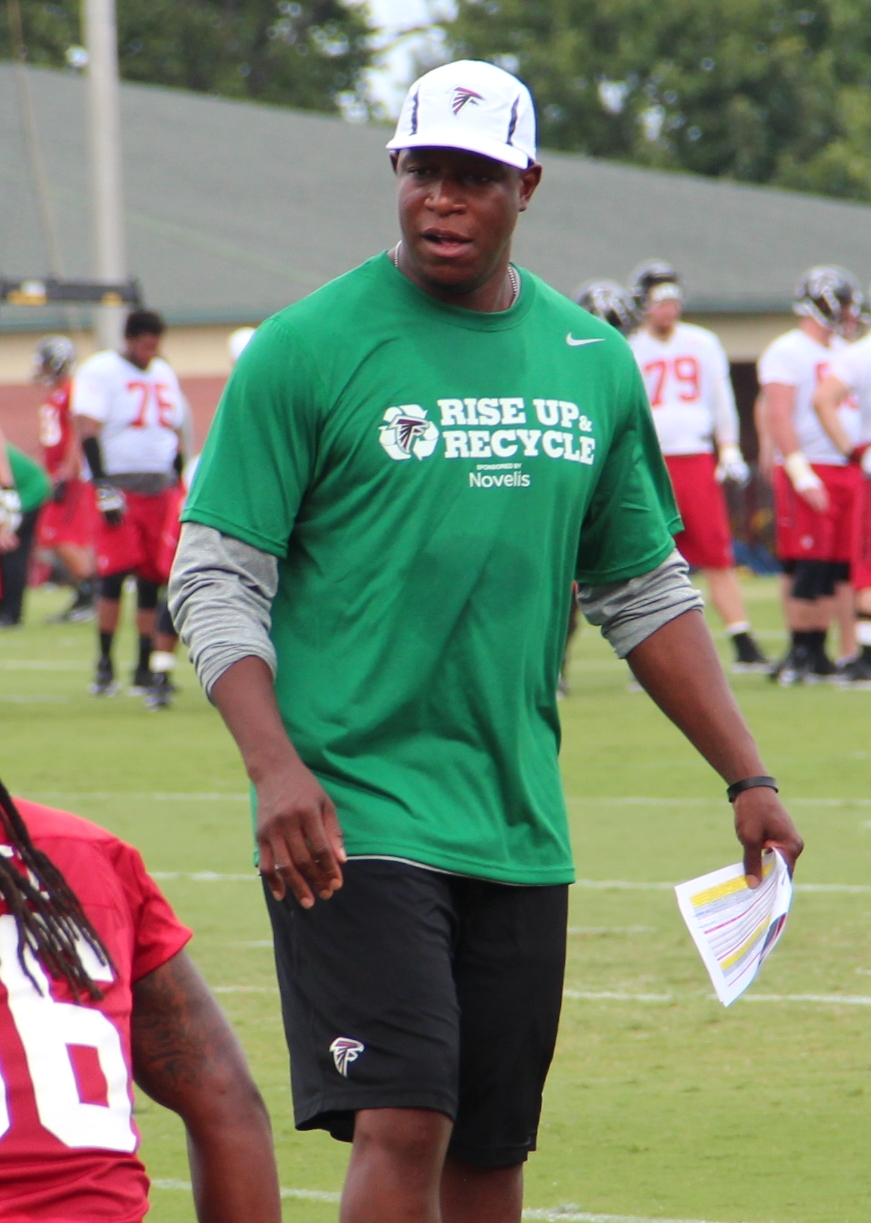
Morris in 2015

On February 10, 2015, Morris was named assistant head coach & defensive pass game coordinator for the Atlanta Falcons under new head coach Dan Quinn. On January 25, 2016, he was moved from defensive pass game coordinator to wide receivers coach.

In the 2016 season, Morris and the Falcons reached Super Bowl LI, where they faced the New England Patriots on February 5, 2017. In the Super Bowl, the Falcons fell in a 34–28 overtime defeat.

Entering the 2017 season, Morris added the title of offensive pass game coordinator to his previous duties, and for the 2018 season, he was solely the assistant head coach and offensive pass game coordinator.

Entering the 2019 season, Morris again changed roles, reverting to assistant head coach and wide receivers coach. However, on November 4, 2019, during the team's bye week after a 1–7 start to the season, Morris was reassigned from wide receivers to secondary coach.

Entering the 2020 season, Morris was promoted to defensive coordinator. However, on October 12, 2020, head coach Dan Quinn was fired after an 0–5 start to the season, and Morris was named interim head coach for the rest of the year while linebackers coach Jeff Ulbrich was promoted to interim defensive coordinator. The Falcons finished with a 4–7 record under Morris but finished 4–12 overall and fourth in the NFC South.

=== Los Angeles Rams ===
On January 21, 2021, Morris was hired by the Los Angeles Rams as defensive coordinator under head coach Sean McVay, replacing Brandon Staley, who left to become the head coach of the Los Angeles Chargers.

On February 13, 2022, Morris won his second Super Bowl when the Rams defeated the Cincinnati Bengals 23–20 in Super Bowl LVI. Morris remained with the Rams for two more seasons, and while the team fell to 5–12 in 2022, the team rebounded with a 10–7 record in 2023 and returned to the playoffs.

=== Atlanta Falcons (second stint) ===
After interviewing Morris, as well as Bill Belichick, Jim Harbaugh, and Mike Vrabel, the Atlanta Falcons hired Morris as their head coach on January 25, 2024. The Falcons finished the 2024 season second in the NFC South with an 8–9 record. Morris received criticism about his time management on various occasions, particularly in a game against the Washington Commanders that Atlanta lost in overtime and subsequently eliminated them from the playoffs.

After compiling another 8–9 record in 2025, Morris and general manager Terry Fontenot were fired on January 4, 2026.

=== San Francisco 49ers ===
On February 1, 2026, Morris was hired by the San Francisco 49ers to be their defensive coordinator, reuniting with head coach Kyle Shanahan, whom he worked with previously in Washington and his first stint in Atlanta.

== Head coaching record ==
Team	Year	Regular season					Postseason			
Team	Year	Won	Lost	Ties	Win %	Finish	Won	Lost	Win %	Result
TB	2009	3	13	0	.188	4th in NFC South	—	—	—	—
TB	2010	10	6	0	.625	3rd in NFC South	—	—	—	—
TB	2011	4	12	0	.250	4th in NFC South	—	—	—	—
TB Total		17	31	0	.354		—	—	—	—
ATL*	2020	4	7	0	.364	4th in NFC South	—	—	—	—
ATL	2024	8	9	0	.471	2nd in NFC South	–	–	–	–
ATL	2025	8	9	0	.471	3rd in NFC South	—	—	—	—
ATL Total		20	25	0	.444		—	—	—	—
Total		37	56	0	.398		—	—	—	—

* Interim head coach
