= Quincy Black =

American football player (born 1984)

No. 58
- Position: Linebacker

Personal information
- Born: February 28, 1984 (age 42); Chicago, Illinois, U.S.
- Listed height: 6 ft 2 in (1.88 m)
- Listed weight: 226 lb (103 kg)

Career information
- High school: Kenwood (Chicago)
- College: New Mexico
- NFL draft: 2007: 3rd round, 68th overall pick

Career history
- Tampa Bay Buccaneers (2007–2012)

Awards and highlights
- First-team All-MW (2006)

Career NFL statistics
- Total tackles: 279
- Sacks: 3.5
- Forced fumbles: 4
- Fumble recoveries: 3
- Interceptions: 3
- Stats at Pro Football Reference

Quincy Booker Black (born February 28, 1984), is an American former professional football player who was a linebacker for the Tampa Bay Buccaneers of the National Football League (NFL). He played college football for the New Mexico Lobos.

== Early life ==
Black attended Kenwood Academy in Chicago, where he played linebacker. Black accrued 224 tackles and 17 sacks over his high-school career, and was a three-year letterman in basketball.

== College career ==
In 2003, Black attended Harper College (Junior college), near Chicago, where he tallied 88 tackles, 28 TFL, and 16.5 sacks before he decided to transfer to University of New Mexico.Black attended Harper College

In 2004, Black started on special teams for all 12 games for the Lobo football team. He gained 18 tackles, and caused a fumble in a game against Colorado State.

In 2005, Black started his 10 games and was the second-leading quarterback rusher. He also recorded his first INT.

=== College statistics ===
Defensive stats

Year	Games	Tackles	TFL	Sacks
2004	10	0	0	0
2005	11	63	17	1
2006	13	114	7	0
Total	34	177	24	1

== Professional career ==
In 2006, Black was predicted by Mel Kiper Jr., a celebrated NFL draft analyst, as one of the top senior linebacker prospects in the country. He led the Mountain West Conference with 94 tackles, had an impressive 42-inch vertical leap on Pro Day, and solidified his position in the NFL Draft as a mid-round prospect.

In 2007, Black was selected by Tampa Bay in the third round with the 68th overall pick.

For the 2009–2010 NFL season, Black was slated to start at the strong side linebacker position in the new era of Buccaneers defense.

On November 13, 2012, Black was placed on injured reserve with a neck injury, and on March 14, 2013, the Tampa Bay Buccaneers announced on their official Facebook page that Black was being released due to a failed physical.

== Post-NFL career ==
Following his career ending injury Quincy went on to earn his M.B.A from University of South Florida-Main Campus , his J.D. from Northwestern Pritzker School of Law, and his LL.M. in Taxation from Georgetown University Law Center. He is a Member of the Florida Bar. , is a Series 65 Holder, and is an NFLPA Certified Contract Negotiator.
