= Kenny Stills =

American football player (born 1992)

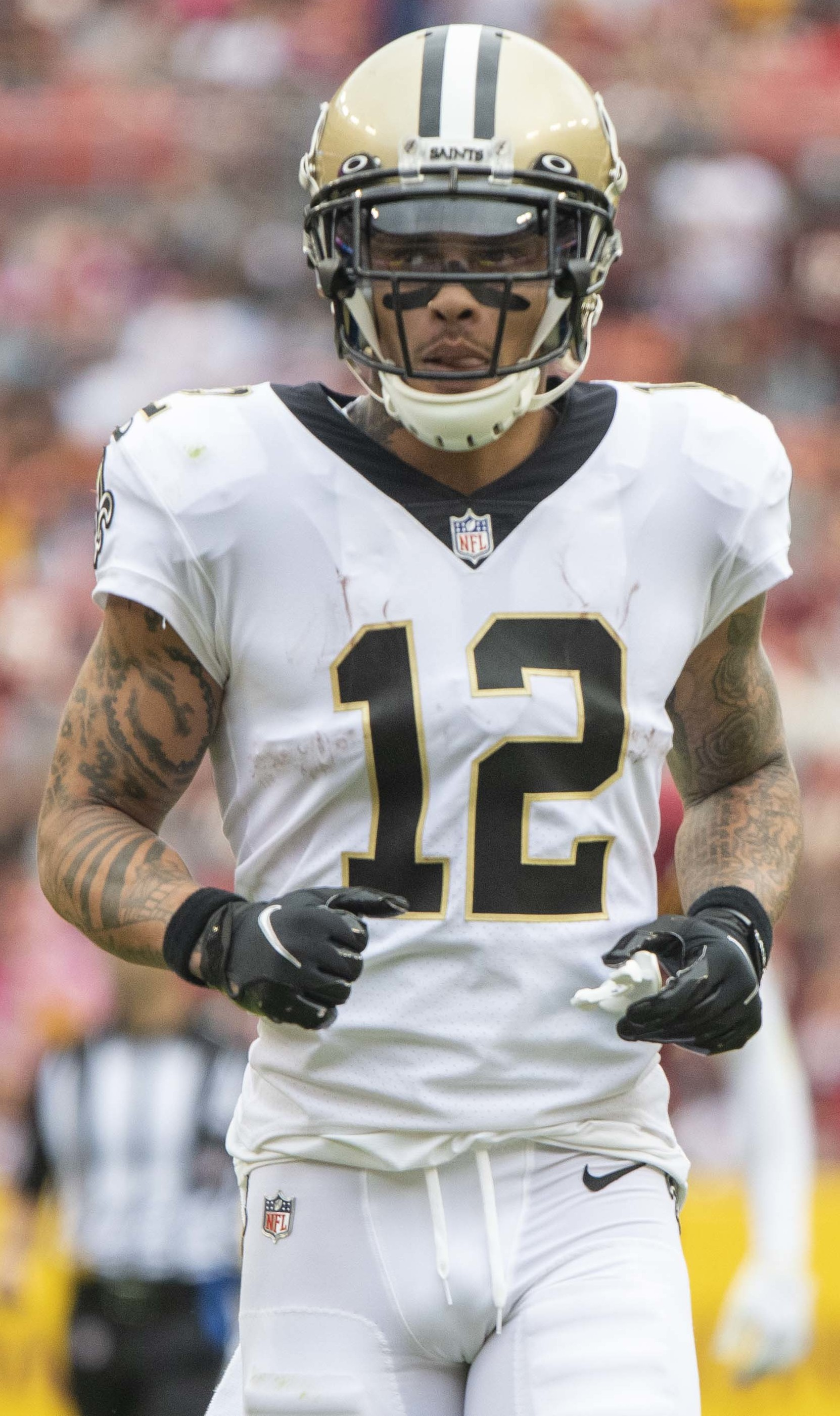
- Stills with the New Orleans Saints in 2021

No. 84, 10, 12
- Position: Wide receiver

Personal information
- Born: April 22, 1992 (age 34); Eden Prairie, Minnesota, U.S.
- Listed height: 6 ft 1 in (1.85 m)
- Listed weight: 202 lb (92 kg)

Career information
- High school: La Costa Canyon (Carlsbad, California)
- College: Oklahoma (2010–2012)
- NFL draft: 2013: 5th round, 144th overall pick

Career history
- New Orleans Saints (2013–2014); Miami Dolphins (2015–2018); Houston Texans (2019–2020); Buffalo Bills (2020); New Orleans Saints (2021)

Awards and highlights
- 2× Second-team All-Big 12 (2011, 2012)

Career NFL statistics
- Receptions: 316
- Receiving yards: 4,911
- Receiving touchdowns: 38
- Stats at Pro Football Reference

Kenneth Lee Stills Jr. (born April 22, 1992) is an American former professional football player who was a wide receiver in the National Football League (NFL). He played college football for the Oklahoma Sooners and was selected by the New Orleans Saints in the fifth round of the 2013 NFL draft.

== Early life ==
Stills attended La Costa Canyon High School in Carlsbad, California, where he was a three-sport star in football, basketball, and track. In his sophomore year, he had 30 catches for 627 yards and six touchdowns. As a junior, he snatched 62 passes for 1,500 yards and 17 touchdowns. As a senior in 2009, he was named CIF first-team at wide receiver after hauling in 45 receptions for 914 yards and 10 touchdowns. His career totals of 3,041 yards receiving established a San Diego area career-record.

As a standout track and field athlete, Stills competed as a sprinter. At the 2009 Avocado League Finals, he earned third-place finishes in both the 100-meter dash (10.84 s) and 200-meter dash (21.76 s).

== College career ==
Stills attended the University of Oklahoma, where he played for coach Bob Stoops's Oklahoma Sooners football team from 2010 to 2012. He started all 14 games for the Sooners as a true freshman in 2010. As a freshman, he had 61 receptions for 786 yards and five touchdowns. In the 2011 season, he had 61 receptions for 849 yards and eight touchdowns. In 2012, he had 82 catches for 959 yards and 11 touchdowns. Overall, in his three years at Oklahoma, he had 204 receptions for 2,594 yards and 24 touchdowns. After the 2012 season, Stills decided to forgo his final year of college eligibility and enter the NFL Draft.

== Professional career ==
Pre-draft measurables
Height	Weight	Arm length	Hand span	40-yard dash	10-yard split	20-yard split	20-yard shuttle	Three-cone drill	Vertical jump	Broad jump	Bench press
6 ft 0 1/2 in (1.84 m)	194 lb (88 kg)	30 1/2 in (0.77 m)	9 in (0.23 m)	4.38 s	1.54 s	2.49 s	4.13 s	7.13 s	33.5 in (0.85 m)	10 ft 4 in (3.15 m)	16 reps
All values from University of Oklahoma Pro Day.

=== New Orleans Saints (first stint) ===
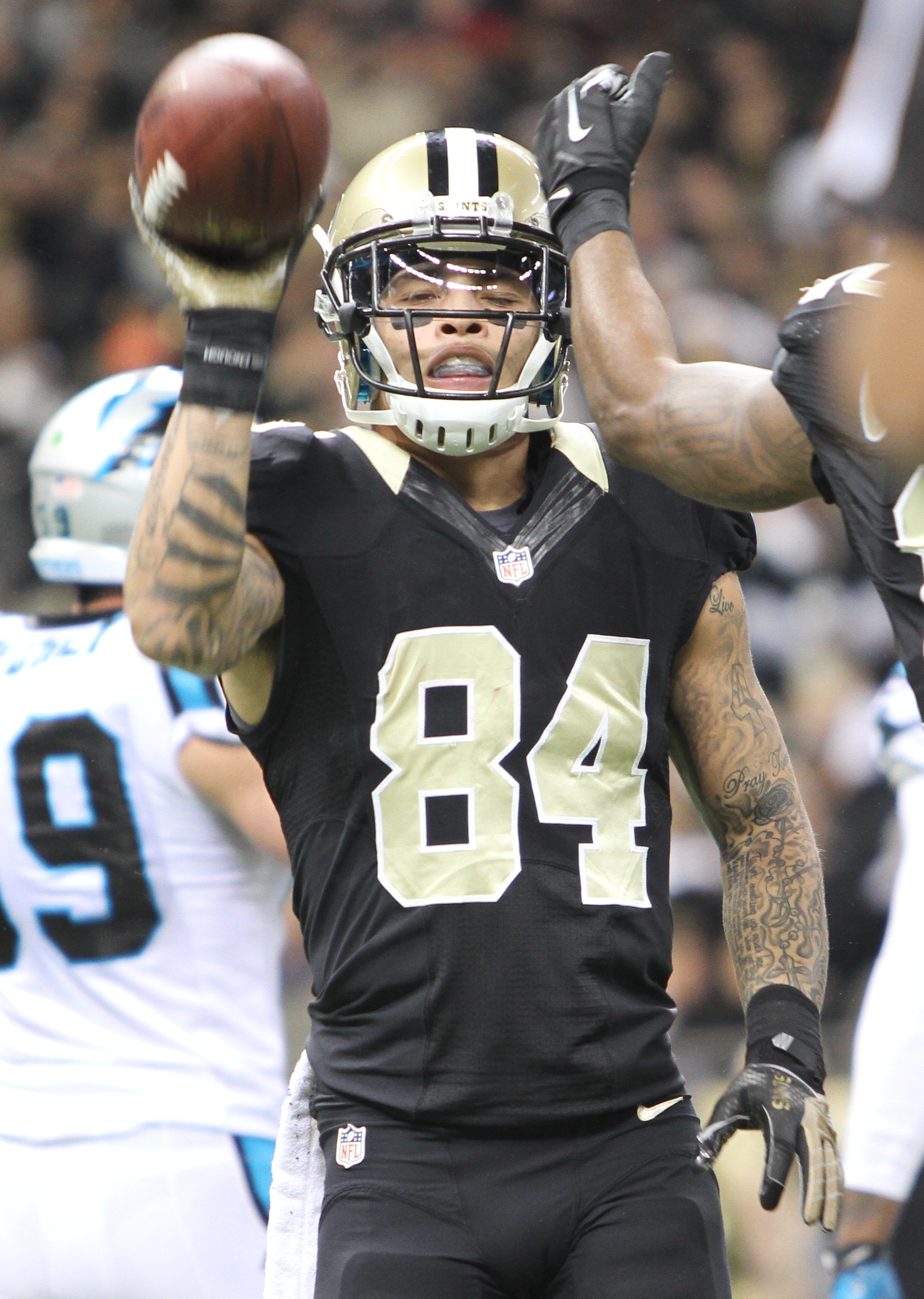
Stills playing for the Saints in 2013

The New Orleans Saints selected Stills in the fifth round (144th overall) of the 2013 NFL draft. Stills was the 16th wide receiver drafted in 2013.

On May 10, 2013, the New Orleans Saints signed Stills to a four-year, $2.35 million contract that includes a signing bonus of $194,452.

Throughout training camp, Stills competed against Joe Morgan, Nick Toon, and Andy Tanner to be the third wide receiver on the Saints’ depth chart. Head coach Sean Payton named Stills the fourth wide receiver on the depth chart to begin the regular season, behind Marques Colston, Lance Moore, and Nick Toon.

Stills made his NFL debut in the season-opener against the Atlanta Falcons and caught two passes for 86 yards in a 23–17 victory. In Week 2, Stills earned his first NFL start and caught a ten-yard pass during a 16–14 win at the Tampa Bay Buccaneers. During Week 6, Stills made three catches for 64 yards and caught his first NFL touchdown during the Saints’ 30–27 loss at the New England Patriots. Stills caught a 34-yard touchdown pass from Saints’ quarterback Drew Brees during the fourth quarter. On October 27, 2013, Stills made three receptions for a season-high 129 receiving yards and caught two touchdown passes as the Saints defeated the Buffalo Bills 35–17 in Week 8. In Week 15, he caught a season-high four passes for 47 receiving yards in a 27–16 loss at the St. Louis Rams.

Stills finished his rookie year with 32 receptions for 641 receiving yards and five touchdowns in 16 games and ten starts. In 2014, Stills recorded career-highs in receptions with 63 and receiving yards with 931 and three touchdowns in 15 games and seven starts.

=== Miami Dolphins ===
On March 13, 2015, Stills was traded to the Miami Dolphins in exchange for linebacker Dannell Ellerbe and a third round pick in the 2015 NFL draft. In the 2015 season, Stills finished with 27 receptions for 440 receiving yards and three receiving touchdowns. In 2016, he started all 16 regular season games recording 42 receptions for 726 yards and nine touchdowns.

On September 11, 2016, Kenny Stills began kneeling during the national anthem to protest police brutality along with teammates Jelani Jenkins, Arian Foster, and Michael Thomas.

On March 8, 2017, Stills signed a four-year, $32 million contract extension with the Dolphins. During Week 7 against the New York Jets, Stills made a miraculous catch where the ball ricocheted between him and a defender, and came back to Stills for the catch. He finished the game with 85 yards and two touchdowns as the Dolphins won by a score of 31–28. During Week 11 against the Tampa Bay Buccaneers, Stills finished with 180 yards and a touchdown in the 30–20 loss. Overall, Stills finished the 2017 season with 58 receptions for 847 receiving yards and six receiving touchdowns.

In the 2018 season opener against the Tennessee Titans, Stills had four receptions for 106 yards and two touchdowns, including a 75-yard reception, in the 27–20 victory. During Week 14 against the New England Patriots, he had eight receptions for 135 yards and a touchdown in the "Miracle in Miami" game. Trailing by five points with seven seconds left, the Dolphins had the ball at their own 31-yard line. Quarterback Ryan Tannehill threw a pass over the middle that was caught by Stills, who lateraled the ball to the right side of the field that was caught by DeVante Parker at midfield. Parker then tossed the ball to running back Kenyan Drake, who ran the ball for a 52-yard touchdown to win the game by a score of 34–33.

Stills finished the 2018 season with 37 receptions for 553 yards and six touchdowns.

=== Houston Texans ===
On August 31, 2019, the Miami Dolphins traded Stills, Laremy Tunsil, and a fourth-round pick to the Houston Texans in exchange for two first-round picks, a second-round pick, Johnson Bademosi, and Julien Davenport. Stills made his debut with the Texans in the season-opener against his former team, the New Orleans Saints. In the game, he caught three passes for 37 yards and a touchdown in the narrow 30–28 road loss. During Week 15 against the Tennessee Titans, Stills caught three passes for 35 yards and two touchdowns in the 24–21 road victory. In the 2019 season, Stills finished with 40 receptions for 561 receiving yards and four receiving touchdowns in 13 games. In the Divisional Round of the playoffs against the Kansas City Chiefs, Stills caught three passes for 80 yards, including a 54-yard touchdown, during the 51–31 road loss.

Stills was placed on the active/non-football illness list at the start of training camp on August 7, 2020. He was activated on August 16. Stills was waived by the Texans on November 27. He had 11 receptions for 144 yards and a touchdown prior to his release.

=== Buffalo Bills ===
On January 4, 2021, Stills was signed to the Buffalo Bills' practice squad. He was elevated to the active roster on January 23 for the AFC Championship against the Kansas City Chiefs, and reverted to the practice squad after the game.

=== New Orleans Saints (second stint) ===
Stills was signed to the New Orleans Saints' practice squad on September 15, 2021. He was promoted to the team's active roster on October 9. In Week 9, against the Atlanta Falcons, Stills scored a touchdown on an eight-yard reception from Trevor Siemian. He was released by New Orleans on December 7. Stills was re-signed to the Saints' active roster on December 10. He appeared in 13 games and recorded six receptions for 68 yards and one touchdown.

== Career statistics ==
Legend
	Led the league
**Bold**	Career high

=== NFL ===
Regular season statistics
Year	Team	Games		Receiving					Rushing					Fumbles	
Year	Team	GP	GS	Rec	Yds	Avg	Lng	TD	Att	Yds	Avg	Lng	TD	Fum	Lost
2013	NO	16	10	32	641	**20.0**	**76T**	5	**3**	**10**	**3.3**	**4**	0	0	0
2014	NO	15	7	**63**	**931**	14.8	69T	3	1	−2	−2.0	−2	0	1	0
2015	MIA	16	8	27	440	16.3	47T	3	0	0	0.0	0	0	0	0
2016	MIA	16	16	42	726	17.3	74T	**9**	0	0	0.0	0	0	0	0
2017	MIA	16	16	58	847	14.6	61T	6	0	0	0.0	0	0	**4**	**2**
2018	MIA	15	15	37	553	14.9	75T	6	0	0	0.0	0	0	1	0
2019	HOU	13	5	40	561	14.0	45	4	0	0	0.0	0	0	0	0
2020	HOU	10	0	11	144	13.1	24	1	0	0	0.0	0	0	0	0
2021	NO	13	4	6	68	11.3	22	1	1	1	1.0	1	0	0	0
Career		130	81	316	4,911	15.5	76T	38	5	9	1.8	4	0	6	2

Postseason statistics
Year	Team	Games		Receiving					Rushing					Fumbles	
Year	Team	GP	GS	Rec	Yds	Avg	Lng	TD	Att	Yds	Avg	Lng	TD	Fum	Lost
2013	NO	2	1	3	35	11.7	14	0	**1**	**1**	**1.0**	**1**	0	0	0
2016	MIA	1	1	5	82	16.4	36	0	0	0	0.0	0	0	0	0
2019	HOU	2	2	**7**	**126**	**18.0**	**54T**	**1**	0	0	0.0	0	0	0	0
2020	BUF	0	0	DNP											
Career		5	4	15	243	16.2	54T	1	1	1	1.0	1	0	0	0

=== College ===
Season	Team	GP	Receiving			
Season	Team	GP	Rec	Yds	Avg	TD
2010	Oklahoma	14	61	786	12.9	5
2011	Oklahoma	11	61	849	**13.9**	8
2012	Oklahoma	13	**82**	**959**	11.7	**11**
Career		38	204	2,594	12.7	24

== Personal life ==
Kenneth Lee Stills Jr. is the son of Annette Delao and Ken Stills, who played in the National Football League from 1985 to 1990. His uncle, Gary Stills, also played in the NFL, as a linebacker from 1999 to 2008. His cousins Dante Stills and Darius Stills played on the defensive line together for West Virginia.

On July 14, 2020, Stills was among 87 other protesters who were arrested outside the home of Kentucky Attorney General Daniel Cameron. Stills was calling for Cameron to arrest the killers of Breonna Taylor. After law enforcement warned that staying on Cameron's property was unlawful, he, along with the rest of the group, was charged with intimidating a participant in a legal process, disorderly conduct and criminal trespass.
