= List of New Orleans Saints head coaches =

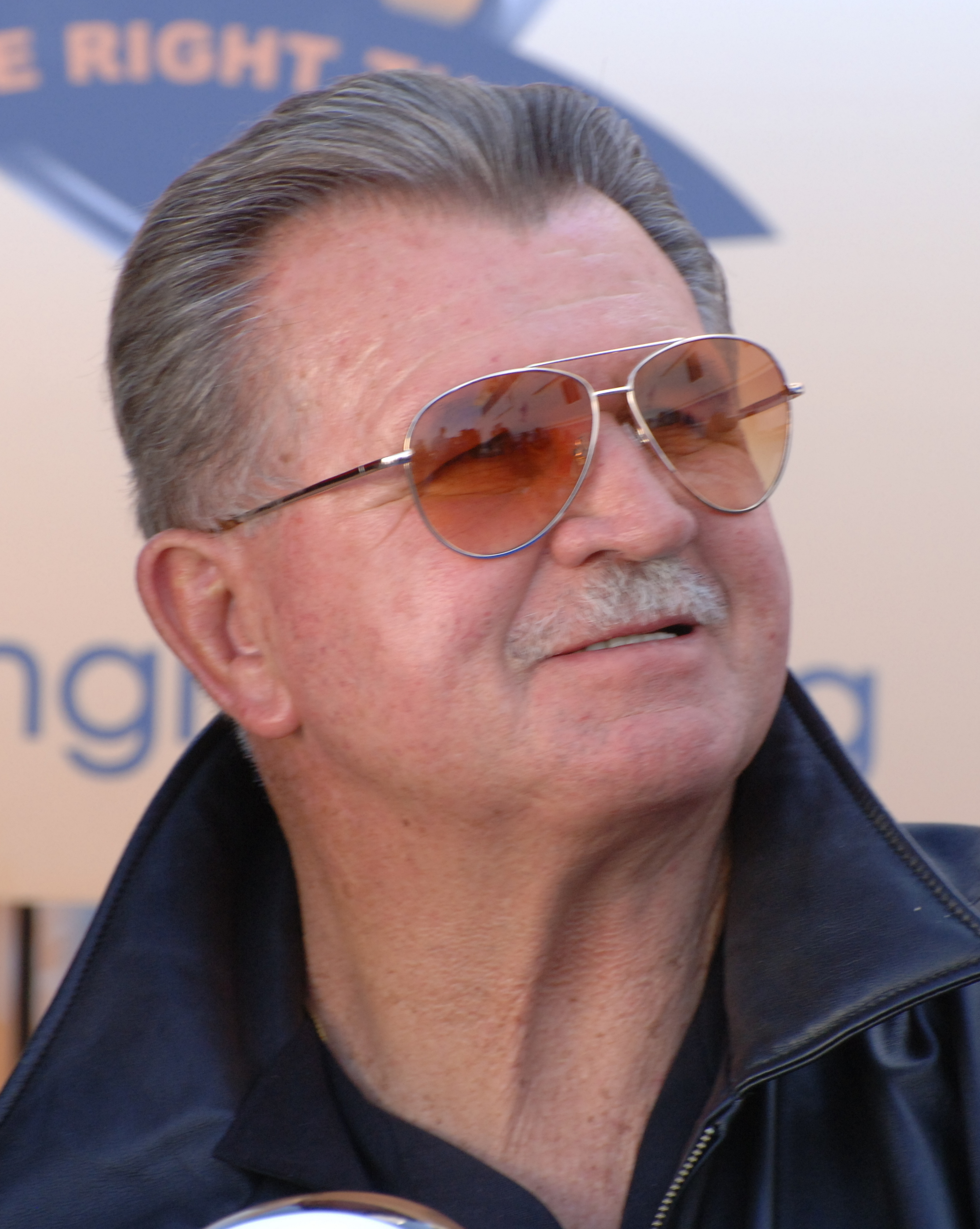
Mike Ditka, the 12th coach of the Saints

The New Orleans Saints are a professional American football team based in New Orleans, Louisiana. They are a member of the South Division of the National Football Conference (NFC) in the National Football League (NFL). The NFL awarded the city of New Orleans the 16th franchise in the league on November 1, 1966, All Saints Day, five months after the 89th United States Congress approved the merger of the NFL with the American Football League (AFL) in June of that year. In January 1967, the team was given the current "New Orleans Saints" name, and began playing in their first season in September of that year.

Since the franchise's creation, it has been based in New Orleans. The team's home games were originally played at Tulane Stadium from 1967 to 1974, it was demolished in 1979, when the team relocated its home games to its current stadium, the Caesars Superdome (formerly Louisiana Superdome from 1975 to 2011).

The New Orleans Saints have had 19 head coaches in their franchise history—twelve full-time coaches and seven interim coaches. Sean Payton, who was the head coach of the Saints from 2006 to 2021, has the most wins as coach. Payton served as the assistant head coach/passing game coordinator and assistant head coach/quarterbacks for the Dallas Cowboys for three seasons before he joined the Saints in 2006.

In the 2009 season, he led the team to its second NFC Championship Game and first NFC Championship title, Super Bowl (XLIV) appearance, and NFL Championship. Tom Fears, the franchise's first head coach serving from 1967 to 1970, was inducted into the Pro Football Hall of Fame in 1970, and is the only coach to be inducted into the Hall of Fame while spending his entire coaching career with the Saints.

Hank Stram, who coached the Saints from 1976 to 1977, and Mike Ditka, who coached the Saints from 1997 to 1999, were also inducted into the Hall of Fame in 2003 and 1988, respectively. Sean Payton has coached the most games for the Saints, with 241. Payton has the highest winning percentage while coaching the Saints, with .631, and his 152 wins are the most in franchise history. J. D. Roberts has the lowest winning percentage (.219) and fewest wins (seven) for a full-time coach. Jim Mora, Jim Haslett, and Payton are the only head coaches to lead the Saints into the playoffs. Mora, Haslett, and Payton have won the AP Coach of the Year Award and the Sporting News NFL Coach of the Year.

== Key ==
#	Number of coaches (Note: A running total of the number of coaches of the Saints. Thus, any coach who has two or more terms as head coach is only counted once. Interim coaches are not included.)
Years	Years coached
GC	Games coached
W	Wins
L	Loses
T	Ties
Win%	Win–loss percentage
†	Elected into the Pro Football Hall of Fame as a coach
‡	Elected into the Pro Football Hall of Fame as a player
*	Spent entire NFL head coaching career with the Saints

== Coaches ==
Note: Statistics are accurate through the end of the 2025 NFL season.

#	Image	Name	Years (Note: Each year is linked to an article about that particular NFL season.)	Regular season					Playoffs				Achievements	Ref
#	Image	Name	Years	GC	W	L	T	Win%	GC	W	L	Win%	Achievements	Ref
1		Tom Fears*‡	1967–1970*	49	13	34	2	.286						
2		J. D. Roberts*	1970–1972*	35	7	25	3	.243						
3		John North*	1973–1975*	34	11	23	0	.324						
–		Ernie Hefferle*	1975*	8	1	7	0	.125						
4		Hank Stram†	1976–1977	28	7	21	0	.250						
5		Dick Nolan	1978–1980	44	15	29	0	.341						
–		Dick Stanfel*‡	1980*	4	1	3	0	.250						
6		Bum Phillips	1981–1985	69	27	42	0	.391						
–		Wade Phillips	1985	4	1	3	0	.250						
7		Jim E. Mora	1986–1996	167	93	74	0	.557	4	0	4	.000	AP NFL Coach of the Year (1987); UPI NFL Coach of the Year (1987); NFC West division champion (1991)	
–		Rick Venturi	1996	8	1	7	0	.125						
8		Mike Ditka‡	1997–1999	48	15	33	0	.313						
9		Jim Haslett	2000–2005	96	45	51	0	.469	2	1	1	.500	AP NFL Coach of the Year (2000); NFC West division champion (2000)	
10		Sean Payton* (Note: Payton was suspended for the 2012 NFL season. Assistant coach Joe Vitt served as interim head coach for the 2012 season. During Vitt's own six-game suspension, the position was filled by fellow assistant Aaron Kromer.)	2006–2011; 2013–2021	241	152	89	0	.631	17	9	8	.533	AP NFL Coach of the Year (2006); NFC South division champion (2006, 2009, 2011, 2017–2020); NFC conference champion (2009); Super Bowl XLIV champion (2009)	
–		Aaron Kromer* (Note: Assistant coach Aaron Kromer served as interim head coach for the first 6 games of the 2012 season.)	2012	6	2	4	0	.333						
–		Joe Vitt (Note: Assistant coach Joe Vitt served as interim head coach for the last 10 games of the 2012 season.)	2012	10	5	5	0	.500						
11		Dennis Allen	2022–2024	43	18	25	0	.419						
–		Darren Rizzi* (Note: Assistant coach Darren Rizzi served as interim head coach for the final 8 games of the 2024 season.)	2024	8	3	5	0	.375						
12		Kellen Moore	2025	17	6	11	0	.353						
