= 2012 New Orleans Saints season =

NFL team season

- Owner: Tom Benson
- General manager: Mickey Loomis (suspended for first 8 games)
- Head coach: Sean Payton (suspended entire season); Joe Vitt (Interim, games 7–16); Aaron Kromer (Interim, games 1–6)
- Home stadium: Mercedes-Benz Superdome

Results
- Record: 7–9
- Division place: 3rd NFC South
- Playoffs: Did not qualify
- All-Pros: 2: G Jahri Evans (1st team); P Thomas Morstead (2nd team)
- Pro Bowlers: 4: QB Drew Brees; T Jermon Bushrod; G Jahri Evans; P Thomas Morstead

Uniform
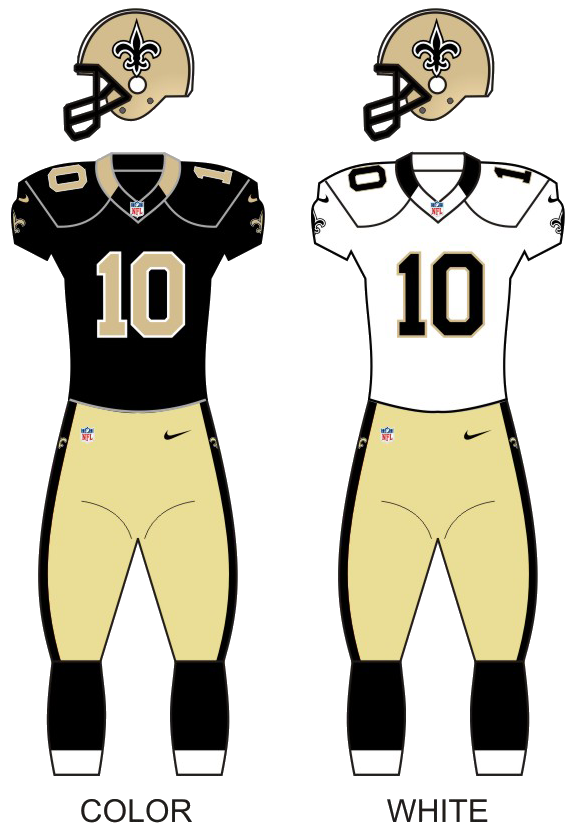

The 2012 season was the New Orleans Saints' 46th in the National Football League (NFL) and their 37th playing home games at the Superdome. The Saints head coach was Sean Payton, but he was suspended by the NFL for the entire season as part of the punishment for the team's bounty scandal. On April 12, 2012, linebackers coach Joe Vitt was named interim head coach to replace Payton while he was suspended. On August 22, 2012, it was announced that Aaron Kromer would take over while Vitt himself served a six-game suspension to start the regular season. The Saints attempted to make history as the first host team to play the Super Bowl on their own home field, but they were eliminated from post-season contention for the first time since 2008 in Week 16. The Saints’ defense struggled all season and began a long stretch of defensive futility that began to hold the team back from playoff contention. They set an NFL record for most yards given up by a defense, 7,042 yards, surpassing the 1981 Baltimore Colts record of 6,793 yards.

== Personnel changes ==
After his contract expired, defensive coordinator Gregg Williams was hired by the St. Louis Rams to the same position on January 16, 2012. Former Rams' head coach Steve Spagnuolo replaced Williams. Williams was later handed an indefinite suspension from the NFL for his role in the bounty scandal.

== Roster changes ==
=== Signings ===
All signings were to active roster, except where otherwise noted.

Pos.	Player	Date	Notes
WR	Andy Tanner	January 18, 2012	
CB	Kamaal McIlwain	January 18, 2012	Released August 27, 2012.
OT	Phil Trautwein	January 18, 2012	Released May 15, 2012
OG	Nick Howell	January 18, 2012	Released May 15, 2012.
QB	Sean Canfield	January 18, 2012	
CB	Josh Victorian	January 18, 2012	Released May 15, 2012
CB	Cord Parks	January 18, 2012	Released July 31, 2012. Re-signed August 2, 2012. Released August 27, 2012.
OT	Fenuki Tupou	January 18, 2012	Placed on injured reserve August 20, 2012.
RB	Chris Taylor	January 18, 2012	Released June 8, 2012
DT	Mitch King	January 18, 2012	
DT	Swanson Miller	January 19, 2012	Released August 27, 2012.
OG	Ben Grubbs	March 15, 2012	From the Baltimore Ravens
DT	Brodrick Bunkley	March 21, 2012	From the Denver Broncos
LB	Chris Chamberlain	March 23, 2012	From the St. Louis Rams. Placed on injured reserve August 20, 2012.
LB	Curtis Lofton	March 24, 2012	From the Atlanta Falcons
LB	David Hawthorne	April 3, 2012	From the Seattle Seahawks
WR	Courtney Roby	April 16, 2012	Re-signed
CB	Jabari Greer	April 20, 2012	Re-signed
LB	Jonathan Casillas	April 24, 2012	Re-signed
K	John Kasay	April 26, 2012	Re-signed
DT	Remi Ayodele	May 7, 2012	Released August 27, 2012.
CB	Marquis Johnson	May 11, 2012	From the St. Louis Rams
OT	Hutch Eckerson	May 14, 2012	Released August 27, 2012.
LB	Lawrence Wilson	May 15, 2012	
CB	Elbert Mack	June 5, 2012	From the Tampa Bay Buccaneers
QB	Luke McCown	June 7, 2012	From the Jacksonville Jaguars. Released August 27, 2012.
QB	Drew Brees	July 13, 2012	Re-signed
TE	Derek Schouman	July 24, 2012	
DE	Alex Daniels	July 31, 2012	
LB	Ramon Humber	August 6, 2012	Re-signed
OG	Paul Fenaroli	August 11, 2012	Released August 27, 2012.
TE	Daniel Graham	August 11, 2012	
WR	Greg Camarillo	August 20, 2012	
LB	Barrett Ruud	August 20, 2012	From the Seattle Seahawks

=== Draft ===
The Saints did not have a first- or second-round selection.^{[a]}^{[b]}

2012 New Orleans Saints draft
Round	Pick	Player	Position	College	Notes
3	89	Akiem Hicks *	DT	Regina	
4	122	Nick Toon	WR	Wisconsin	
5	162	Corey White	S	Samford	
6	179	Andrew Tiller	OG	Syracuse	Pick from MIA^{[c]}
7	234	Marcel Jones	OT	Nebraska	
Made roster † Pro Football Hall of Fame * Made at least one Pro Bowl during career

NOTES
^{^[a]} The team traded its 2012 first-round selection and a 2011 second-round selection to the New England Patriots in exchange for the Patriots' 2011 first-round selection.
^{^[b]} The team forfeited their second-round selections in 2012 and 2013 as part of the punishment for the team's bounty scandal.
^{^[c]} The team swapped picks in the sixth round with the Miami Dolphins as part of the Reggie Bush trade.

=== Undrafted free agents ===
All undrafted free agents were signed just after the 2012 NFL draft concluded on April 28.

Position	Player	College	Notes
LB	Kadarron Anderson	Furman	Added to the team roster on April 30, will participate in rookie mini-camp
WR	Malcolm Beyah	Middle Tennessee State	Added to the team roster on April 30, will participate in rookie mini-camp. Released June 13, 2012.
DE	Braylon Broughton	TCU	Added to the team roster on April 30, will participate in rookie mini-camp
TE	Jake Byrne	Wisconsin	Added to the team roster on April 30, will participate in rookie mini-camp. Released August 27, 2012.
RB	Travaris Cadet	Appalachian State	Added to the team roster on April 30, will participate in rookie mini-camp
DB	A.J. Davis	Jacksonville State	Added to the team roster on April 30, will participate in rookie mini-camp. Placed on injured reserve August 11, 2012. Released August 18, 2012.
C	Brian Folkerts	Washburn	Added to the team roster on April 30, will participate in rookie mini-camp. Released August 27, 2012.
WR	Chris Givens	Miami (OH)	Added to the team roster on April 30, will participate in rookie mini-camp. Placed on injured reserve August 2, 2012.
S	Jose Gumbs	Monmouth	Added to the team roster on April 30, will participate in rookie mini-camp
WR	Kevin Hardy	The Citadel	Added to the team roster on April 30, will participate in rookie mini-camp. Released July 24, 2012. Re-signed August 6, 2012. Released August 27, 2012.
OT	Dan Hoch	Missouri	Added to the team roster on April 30, will participate in rookie mini-camp. Released May 15, 2012.
LB	Stephen Johnson	Temple	Added to the team roster on April 30, will participate in rookie mini-camp. Released May 15, 2012.
S	Jerico Nelson	Arkansas	Added to the team roster on April 30, will participate in rookie mini-camp
RS	Laron Scott	Georgia Southern	Added to the team roster on April 30, will participate in rookie mini-camp. Releases August 6, 2012.
OT	Aderious Simmons	Arizona State	Added to the team roster on April 30, will participate in rookie mini-camp
LB	Aaron Tevis	Boise State	Added to the team roster on April 30, will participate in rookie mini-camp. Released August 27, 2012.
S	Johnny Thomas	Oklahoma State	Added to the team roster on April 30, will participate in rookie mini-camp. Released August 27, 2012.
DE/DT	Tyrunn Walker	Tulsa	Added to the team roster on April 30, will participate in rookie mini-camp
OG	DeOn'tae Pannell	Penn State	Added to the team roster on May 15 after participating in rookie mini-camp
DB	Nick Hixson	Hillsdale	Added to the team roster on May 15 after participating in rookie mini-camp. Released June 8, 2012. Re-signed August 11, 2012.
OG	Scott Winnewisser	California (PA)	Signed May 29, 2012. Placed on injured reserve August 6, 2012.
RB	Joe Banyard	UTEP	Signed June 7, 2012.
WR	Derek Moye	Penn State	Claimed off waivers from the Miami Dolphins on June 13, 2012. Released August 27, 2012.
LB	Donavan Robinson	Jackson State	Signed June 22, 2012. Released August 27, 2012.
WR	Marques Clark	Henderson State	Signed July 24, 2012. Released August 27, 2012.

== Staff ==
2012 New Orleans Saints staff
Front office: Owner/president – Tom Benson; Owner/executive vice president – Rita Benson LeBlanc; Executive vice president/general manager – Mickey Loomis; Director of football administration – Khai Harley; Director of pro scouting – Ryan Pace; Director of college scouting – Rick Reiprish; Assistant director of college scouting – Brian Adams; Head coaches: Head coach – Sean Payton†; Interim head coach (games 7-16)/assistant head coach/linebackers – Joe Vitt; Interim head coach (games 1-6)/offensive line/running game – Aaron Kromer; Offensive coaches: Offensive coordinator – Pete Carmichael, Jr.; Quarterbacks – Joe Lombardi; Running backs – Bret Ingalls; Wide receivers – Henry Ellard; Tight ends – Terry Malone; Offensive assistant – Carter Sheridan; Offensive assistant – Frank Smith; † – suspended for the entire 2012 season (see New Orleans Saints bounty scandal)	Defensive coaches: Defensive coordinator – Steve Spagnuolo; Defensive line – Bill Johnson; Assistant defensive line – Travis Jones; Secondary – Ken Flajole; Assistant secondary – Andre Curtis; Defensive assistant – Marcus Ungaro; Defensive assistant – Brian Young; Special teams coaches: Special teams coordinator – Greg McMahon; Assistant special teams – Mike Mallory; Strength and conditioning: Head strength and conditioning – Dan Dalrymple; Assistant strength and conditioning – Charles Byrd; Weight room assistant – Robert Wenning

== Final roster ==
2012 New Orleans Saints roster
Quarterbacks (QB): 9 Drew Brees; 10 Chase Daniel; Running backs (RB): 39 Travaris Cadet; 45 Jed Collins FB; 28 Mark Ingram; 29 Chris Ivory; 43 Darren Sproles RS; Wide receivers (WR): 12 Marques Colston; 18 Saalim Hakim; 19 Devery Henderson; 16 Lance Moore; 13 Joe Morgan; 15 Courtney Roby KR; Tight ends (TE): 80 Jimmy Graham; 81 Michael Higgins; 85 David Thomas	Offensive linemen (OL): 74 Jermon Bushrod T; 60 Brian de la Puente C; 73 Jahri Evans G; 66 Ben Grubbs G; 65 Ricky Henry G; 69 Eric Olsen C/G; 68 William Robinson T; 64 Zach Strief T; Defensive linemen (DL): 77 Brodrick Bunkley DT; 98 Sedrick Ellis DT; 93 Junior Galette DE; 76 Akiem Hicks DE; 96 Tom Johnson DT; 94 Cameron Jordan DE; 90 Turk McBride DE; 91 Will Smith DE; 75 Tyrunn Walker DT	Linebackers (LB): 52 Jonathan Casillas OLB; 57 David Hawthorne OLB; 54 Will Herring OLB; 53 Ramon Humber MLB; 50 Curtis Lofton MLB; 58 Scott Shanle OLB; 51 Jonathan Vilma OLB; 95 Martez Wilson OLB; Defensive backs (DB): 42 Isa Abdul-Quddus FS; 25 Rafael Bush SS; 20 A. J. Davis CB; 33 Jabari Greer CB; 41 Roman Harper SS; 44 Elbert Mack CB; 37 Jerico Nelson FS; 32 Johnny Patrick CB; 21 Patrick Robinson CB; Special teams (ST): 47 Justin Drescher LS; 5 Garrett Hartley K; 6 Thomas Morstead P	Practice squad: 62 Braylon Broughton DE; 86 Jarred Fayson WR; 61 Jermarcus Hardrick T; 63 Ryan Lee G (IR); 30 Ryan Steed CB; 14 Andy Tanner WR; 31 Phillip Thomas S; 78 Wayne Tribue G; Reserve: 71 Charles Brown T (IR); 56 Chris Chamberlain OLB (IR); 17 Chris Givens WR (IR); 79 Bryce Harris T (IR); 27 Malcolm Jenkins FS (IR); 70 Marcel Jones T (IR); 99 Greg Romeus DE (IR); 23 Pierre Thomas RB (IR); 67 Andrew Tiller G (IR); 88 Nick Toon WR (IR); 24 Corey White CB (IR); Rookies in italics 53 active, 12 reserve, 7 practice squad

== Schedule ==
=== Preseason ===
Week	Date	Opponent	Result	Record	Venue	Recap
HOF	August 5	vs. Arizona Cardinals	**W** 17–10	1–0	Fawcett Stadium (Canton, Ohio)	Recap
1	August 9	at New England Patriots	**L** 6–7	1–1	Gillette Stadium	Recap
2	August 17	Jacksonville Jaguars	**L** 24–27	1–2	Mercedes-Benz Superdome	Recap
3	August 25	Houston Texans	**W** 34–27	2–2	Mercedes-Benz Superdome	Recap
4	August 30	at Tennessee Titans	**L** 6–10	2–3	LP Field	Recap

=== Regular season ===
Week	Date	Opponent	Result	Record	Venue	Recap
1	September 9	Washington Redskins	**L** 32–40	0–1	Mercedes-Benz Superdome	Recap
2	September 16	at **Carolina Panthers**	**L** 27–35	0–2	Bank of America Stadium	Recap
3	September 23	Kansas City Chiefs	**L** 24–27 (OT)	0–3	Mercedes-Benz Superdome	Recap
4	September 30	at Green Bay Packers	**L** 27–28	0–4	Lambeau Field	Recap
5	October 7	San Diego Chargers	**W** 31–24	1–4	Mercedes-Benz Superdome	Recap
6	Bye					
7	October 21	at **Tampa Bay Buccaneers**	**W** 35–28	2–4	Raymond James Stadium	Recap
8	October 28	at Denver Broncos	**L** 14–34	2–5	Sports Authority Field at Mile High	Recap
9	November 5	Philadelphia Eagles	**W** 28–13	3–5	Mercedes-Benz Superdome	Recap
10	November 11	**Atlanta Falcons**	**W** 31–27	4–5	Mercedes-Benz Superdome	Recap
11	November 18	at Oakland Raiders	**W** 38–17	5–5	O.co Coliseum	Recap
12	November 25	San Francisco 49ers	**L** 21–31	5–6	Mercedes-Benz Superdome	Recap
13	November 29	at **Atlanta Falcons**	**L** 13–23	5–7	Georgia Dome	Recap
14	December 9	at New York Giants	**L** 27–52	5–8	MetLife Stadium	Recap
15	December 16	**Tampa Bay Buccaneers**	**W** 41–0	6–8	Mercedes-Benz Superdome	Recap
16	December 23	at Dallas Cowboys	**W** 34–31 (OT)	7–8	Cowboys Stadium	Recap
17	December 30	**Carolina Panthers**	**L** 38–44	7–9	Mercedes-Benz Superdome	Recap

Note: Intra-division opponents are in bold text.

=== Game summaries ===
==== Week 1: vs. Washington Redskins ====
Week One: Washington Redskins at New Orleans Saints – Game summary

Quarter	1	2	3	4	Total
**Redskins**	10	10	10	10	**40**
Saints	7	7	3	15	**32**

at Mercedes-Benz Superdome, New Orleans, Louisiana

- Date: September 9
- Game time: 12:00 p.m. CDT
- Game weather: Played indoors (dome stadium)
- Game attendance: 72,180
- Referee: David Scott
- TV announcers (Fox): Kenny Albert, Daryl Johnston and Tony Siragusa

Game information

**First quarter**

- WAS – Billy Cundiff 37-yard field goal, 7:05. Redskins 3–0. **Drive: 12 plays, 49 yards, 7:29.**
- NO – Jimmy Graham 20-yard pass from Drew Brees (Garrett Hartley kick), 3:49. Saints 7–3. **Drive: 7 plays, 80 yards, 3:16.**
- WAS – Pierre Garçon 88-yard pass from Robert Griffin III (Billy Cundiff kick), 3:28. Redskins 10–7. **Drive: 1 play, 88 yards, 0:21.**

**Second quarter**

- WAS – Aldrick Robinson 5-yard pass from Robert Griffin III (Billy Cundiff kick), 11:33. Redskins 17–7. **Drive: 12 plays, 57 yards, 6:20.**
- WAS – Billy Cundiff 41-yard field goal, 6:08. Redskins 20–7. **Drive: 7 plays, 29 yards, 3:05.**
- NO – Courtney Roby 4-yard return of blocked punt (Garrett Hartley kick), 0:40. Redskins 20–14.

**Third quarter**

- WAS – Alfred Morris 1-yard run (Billy Cundiff kick), 11:24. Redskins 27–14. **Drive: 7 plays, 77 yards, 3:36.**
- WAS – Billy Cundiff 37-yard field goal, 7:10. Redskins 30–14. **Drive: 8 plays, 45 yards, 3:40.**
- NO – Garrett Hartley 21-yard field goal, 1:50. Redskins 30–17. **Drive: 12 plays, 87 yards, 5:20.**

**Fourth quarter**

- WAS – Billy Cundiff 45-yard field goal, 10:59. Redskins 33–17. **Drive: 12 plays, 53 yards, 5:51.**
- NO – Lance Moore 33-yard pass from Drew Brees (Darren Sproles run), 6:19. Redskins 33–25. **Drive: 6 plays, 58 yards, 1:04.**
- WAS – Alfred Morris 3-yard run (Billy Cundiff kick), 3:18. Redskins 40–25. **Drive: 1 play, 3 yards, 0:05.**
- NO – Darren Sproles 2-yard pass from Drew Brees (Garrett Hartley kick), 2:25. Redskins 40–32. **Drive: 10 plays, 80 yards, 0:53.**

**Top passers**

- WAS – Robert Griffin III – 19/26, 320 yards, 2 TD
- NO – Drew Brees – 24/52, 339 yards, 3 TD, 2 INT

**Top rushers**

- WAS – Alfred Morris – 28 rushes, 96 yards, 2 TD
- NO – Pierre Thomas – 4 rushes, 17 yards

**Top receivers**

- WAS – Pierre Garçon – 4 receptions, 109 yards, TD
- NO – Lance Moore – 6 receptions, 120 yards, TD

With the loss, the Saints started their season 0–1.

==== Week 2: at Carolina Panthers ====
Week Two: New Orleans Saints at Carolina Panthers – Game summary

Quarter	1	2	3	4	Total
Saints	10	3	0	14	**27**
**Panthers**	7	14	7	7	**35**

at Bank of America Stadium, Charlotte, North Carolina

- Date: September 16
- Game time: 1:00 p.m. EDT/12:00 p.m. CDT
- Game weather: 71 °F (22 °C), cloudy
- Game attendance: 72,879
- Referee: Gerald Wright
- TV announcers (Fox): Ron Pitts, Mike Martz and Kristina Pink

Game information

**First quarter**

- NO – Jimmy Graham 1-yard pass from Drew Brees (Garrett Hartley kick), 9:39. Saints 7–0. **Drive: 11 plays, 80 yards, 5:21.**
- CAR – Charles Godfrey 9-yard interception return (Justin Medlock kick), 5:33. Tied 7–7.
- NO – Garrett Hartley 22-yard field goal, 1:26. Saints 10–7. **Drive: 10 plays, 76 yards, 4:07.**

**Second quarter**

- NO – Garrett Hartley 53-yard field goal, 7:08. Saints 13–7. **Drive: 11 plays, 57 yards, 4:36.**
- CAR – Jonathan Stewart 17-yard pass from Cam Newton (Justin Medlock kick), 3:33. Panthers 14–13. **Drive: 8 plays, 74 yards, 3:35.**
- CAR – Mike Tolbert 2-yard run (Justin Medlock kick), 0:11. Panthers 21–13. **Drive: 8 plays, 58 yards, 2:20.**

**Third quarter**

- CAR – DeAngelo Williams 3-yard run (Justin Medlock kick), 8:17. Panthers 28–13. **Drive: 6 plays, 80 yards, 3:04.**

**Fourth quarter**

- NO – Mark Ingram 1-yard run (Garrett Hartley kick), 12:53. Panthers 28–20. **Drive: 9 plays, 68 yards, 3:35.**
- CAR – Cam Newton 5-yard run (Justin Medlock kick), 9:55. Panthers 35–20. **Drive: 6 plays, 80 yards, 2:58.**
- NO – Drew Brees 1-yard run (Garrett Hartley kick), 1:55. Panthers 35–27. **Drive: 12 plays, 81 yards, 2:54.**

**Top passers**

- NO – Drew Brees – 31/49, 325 yards, TD, 2 INT
- CAR – Cam Newton – 14/20, 253 yards, TD

**Top rushers**

- NO – Pierre Thomas – 9 rushes, 110 yards
- CAR – Cam Newton – 13 rushes, 71 yards, TD

**Top receivers**

- NO – Darren Sproles – 13 receptions, 128 yards
- CAR – Steve Smith Sr. – 3 receptions, 104 yards

With the loss, the Saints fell to 0–2.

==== Week 3: vs. Kansas City Chiefs ====
Week Three: Kansas City Chiefs at New Orleans Saints – Game summary

Quarter	1	2	3	4	OT	Total
**Chiefs**	3	3	7	11	3	**27**
Saints	7	3	14	0	0	**24**

at Mercedes-Benz Superdome, New Orleans, Louisiana

- Date: September 23
- Game time: 12:00 p.m. CDT
- Game weather: Played indoors (dome stadium)
- Game attendance: 72,226
- Referee: Don King
- TV announcers (CBS): Greg Gumbel and Dan Dierdorf

Game information

**First quarter**

- NO – Lance Moore 9-yard pass from Drew Brees (Garrett Hartley kick), 12:18. Saints 7–0. **Drive: 6 plays, 83 yards, 2:42.**
- KC – Ryan Succop 25-yard field goal, 4:51. Saints 7–3. **Drive: 14 plays, 82 yards, 7:27.**

**Second quarter**

- NO – Garrett Hartley 40-yard field goal, 14:55. Saints 10–3. **Drive: 10 plays, 65 yards, 4:56.**
- KC – Ryan Succop 45-yard field goal, 4:41. Saints 10–6. **Drive: 5 plays, 18 yards, 1:34.**

**Third quarter**

- NO – Jimmy Graham 1-yard pass from Drew Brees (Garrett Hartley kick), 13:10. Saints 17–6. **Drive: 5 plays, 19 yards, 1:41.**
- NO – Jed Collins 6-yard pass from Drew Brees (Garrett Hartley kick), 5:36. Saints 24–6. **Drive: 2 plays, 7 yards, 0:45.**
- KC – Jamaal Charles 91-yard run (Ryan Succop kick), 5:18. Saints 24–13. **Drive: 1 play, 91 yards, 0:18.**

**Fourth quarter**

- KC – Ryan Succop 34-yard field goal, 13:40. Saints 24–16. **Drive: 8 plays, 52 yards, 3:48.**
- KC – Ryan Succop 38-yard field goal, 9:11. Saints 24–19. **Drive: 9 plays, 50 yards, 3:32.**
- KC – Drew Brees sacked in endzone by Justin Houston for safety, 5:40. Saints 24–21.
- KC – Ryan Succop 43-yard field goal, 0:03. Tied 24–24. **Drive: 13 plays, 37 yards, 5:30.**

**Overtime**

- KC – Ryan Succop 31-yard field goal, 6:27. Chiefs 27–24. **Drive: 12 plays, 40 yards, 5:19.**

**Top passers**

- KC – Matt Cassel – 26/44, 248 yards, INT
- NO – Drew Brees – 20/36, 240 yards, 3 TD, INT

**Top rushers**

- KC – Jamaal Charles – 33 rushes, 233 yards, TD
- NO – Darren Sproles – 7 rushes, 62 yards

**Top receivers**

- KC – Dwayne Bowe – 7 receptions, 79 yards
- NO – Lance Moore – 4 receptions, 40 yards, TD

With the close loss, the Saints fell to 0–3.

==== Week 4: at Green Bay Packers ====
Week Four: New Orleans Saints at Green Bay Packers – Game summary

Quarter	1	2	3	4	Total
Saints	7	7	10	3	**27**
**Packers**	7	14	0	7	**28**

at Lambeau Field, Green Bay, Wisconsin

- Date: September 30
- Game time: 3:25 p.m. CDT
- Game weather: 64 °F (18 °C), partly cloudy
- Game attendance: 70,571
- Referee: Jeff Triplette
- TV announcers (Fox): Joe Buck, Troy Aikman and Pam Oliver

Game information

**First quarter**

- GB – James Jones 12-yard pass from Aaron Rodgers (Mason Crosby kick), 9:02. Packers 7–0. **Drive: 7 plays, 62 yards, 2:04.**
- NO – Marques Colston 20-yard pass from Drew Brees (Garrett Hartley kick), 3:33. Tied 7–7. **Drive: 9 plays, 80 yards, 5:29.**

**Second quarter**

- GB – Greg Jennings 9-yard pass from Aaron Rodgers (Mason Crosby kick), 14:15. Packers 14–7. **Drive: 11 plays, 80 yards, 4:18.**
- GB – James Jones 14-yard pass from Aaron Rodgers (Mason Crosby kick), 4:50. Packers 21–7. **Drive: 13 plays, 92 yards, 6:08.**
- NO – Darren Sproles 6-yard pass from Drew Brees (Garrett Hartley kick), 0:27. Packers 21–14. **Drive: 12 plays, 80 yards, 4:23.**

**Third quarter**

- NO – Garrett Hartley 20-yard field goal, 9:41. Packers 21–17. **Drive: 13 plays, 72 yards, 5:19.**
- NO – Joseph Morgan 80-yard pass from Drew Brees (Garrett Hartley kick), 3:49. Saints 24–21. **Drive: 4 plays, 92 yards, 1:21.**

**Fourth quarter**

- NO – Garrett Hartley 27-yard field goal, 13:04. Saints 27–21. **Drive: 11 plays, 57 yards, 4:31.**
- GB – Jordy Nelson 11-yard pass from Aaron Rodgers (Mason Crosby kick), 7:00. Packers 28–27. **Drive: 7 plays, 57 yards, 3:25.**

**Top passers**

- NO – Drew Brees – 35/54, 446 yards, 3 TD
- GB – Aaron Rodgers – 31/41, 319 yards, 4 TD, INT

**Top rushers**

- NO – Darren Sproles – 5 rushes, 20 yards
- GB – Cedric Benson – 18 carries, 84 yards

**Top receivers**

- NO – Marques Colston – 9 receptions, 153 yards, TD
- GB – Jordy Nelson – 8 receptions, 93 yards, TD

With the loss, the Saints faced their first 0–4 start since 2007.

==== Week 5: vs. San Diego Chargers ====
Week Five: San Diego Chargers at New Orleans Saints – Game summary

Quarter	1	2	3	4	Total
Chargers	7	10	7	0	**24**
**Saints**	7	7	7	10	**31**

at Mercedes-Benz Superdome, New Orleans, Louisiana

- Date: October 7
- Game time: 7:20 p.m. CDT
- Game weather: Played indoors (dome stadium)
- Game attendance: 73,109
- Referee: Carl Cheffers
- TV announcers (NBC): Al Michaels, Cris Collinsworth and Michele Tafoya

Game information

**First quarter**

- SD – Robert Meachem 15-yard pass from Philip Rivers (Nick Novak kick), 6:56. Chargers 7–0. **Drive: 7 plays, 91 yards, 3:26.**
- NO – Devery Henderson 40-yard pass from Drew Brees (Garrett Hartley kick), 2:58. Tied 7–7. **Drive: 9 plays, 80 yards, 3:58.**

**Second quarter**

- SD – Nick Novak 20-yard field goal, 9:58. Chargers 10–7. **Drive: 8 plays, 63 yards, 4:08.**
- NO – Marques Colston 19-yard pass from Drew Brees (Garrett Hartley kick), 7:19. Saints 14-10. **Drive: 7 plays, 80 yards, 2:39.**
- SD – Robert Meachem 44-yard pass from Philip Rivers (Nick Novak kick), 0:36. Chargers 17–14. **Drive: 4 plays, 86 yards, 1:12.**

**Third quarter**

- SD – Ryan Mathews 13-yard run (Nick Novak kick), 12:27. Chargers 24–14. **Drive: 3 plays, 25 yards, 1:19.**
- NO – Marques Colston 16-yard pass from Drew Brees (Garrett Hartley kick), 0:11. Chargers 24–21. **Drive: 9 plays, 87 yards, 4:28.**

**Fourth quarter**

- NO – Marques Colston 5-yard pass from Drew Brees (Garrett Hartley kick), 8:50. Saints 28–24. **Drive: 9 plays, 90 yards, 5:49.**
- NO – Garrett Hartley 26-yard field goal, 2:56. Saints 31–24. **Drive: 7 plays, 16 yards, 2:49.**

**Top passers**

- SD – Philip Rivers – 27/42, 354 yards, 2 TD, INT
- NO – Drew Brees – 29/45, 370 yards, 4 TD, INT

**Top rushers**

- SD – Ryan Mathews – 12 rushes, 80 yards, TD
- NO – Pierre Thomas – 9 carries, 30 yards

**Top receivers**

- SD – Malcolm Floyd – 5 receptions, 108 yards
- NO – Marques Colston – 9 receptions, 131 yards, 3 TD

Drew Brees broke Johnny Unitas' record of consecutive games with a touchdown in the first quarter. The record touchdown was witnessed by Unitas' son Joe. Head coach Sean Payton, interim head coach Joe Vitt and general managerMickey Loomis were granted permission to attend the game, despite their suspensions. Brees specifically requested for the three to be in attendance at the Superdome. With the surprising win, the Saints go into their bye week at 1–4.

==== Week 7: at Tampa Bay Buccaneers ====
Week Seven: New Orleans Saints at Tampa Bay Buccaneers – Game summary

Quarter	1	2	3	4	Total
**Saints**	7	21	0	7	**35**
Buccaneers	14	7	0	7	**28**

at Raymond James Stadium, Tampa, Florida

- Date: October 21
- Game time: 1:00 p.m. EDT/12:00 p.m. CDT
- Game weather: 77 °F (25 °C), sunny
- Game attendance: 58,906
- Referee: Jerome Boger
- TV announcers (Fox): Dick Stockton, John Lynch and Jennifer Hale

Game information

**First quarter**

- TB – Tiquan Underwood 13-yard pass from Josh Freeman (Connor Barth kick), 12:22. Buccaneers 7–0. **Drive: 1 play, 13 yards, 0:05.**
- TB – Doug Martin 36-yard run (Connor Barth kick), 5:55. Buccaneers 14–0. **Drive: 10 plays, 76 yards, 4:58.**
- NO – Marques Colston 17-yard pass from Drew Brees (Garrett Hartley kick), 1:46. Buccaneers 14–7. **Drive: 8 plays, 80 yards, 4:09.**

**Second quarter**

- TB – Vincent Jackson 17-yard pass from Josh Freeman (Connor Barth kick), 13:18. Buccaneers 21–7. **Drive: 6 plays, 80 yards, 3:28.**
- NO – Darren Sproles 9-yard pass from Drew Brees (Garrett Hartley kick), 9:24. Buccaneers 21–14. **Drive: 9 plays, 80 yards, 3:54.**
- NO – Joe Morgan 48-yard pass from Drew Brees (Garrett Hartley kick), 4:35. Tied 21–21. **Drive: 5 plays, 79 yards, 2:45.**
- NO – David Thomas 20-yard pass from Drew Brees (Garrett Hartley kick), 0:15. Saints 28–21. **Drive: 9 plays, 72 yards, 1:38.**

**Third quarter**

- No scoring plays.

**Fourth quarter**

- NO – Pierre Thomas 5-yard run (Garrett Hartley kick), 13:23. Saints 35–21. **Drive: 12 plays, 95 yards, 5:01.**
- TB – Dallas Clark 3-yard pass from Josh Freeman (Connor Barth kick), 4:10. Saints 35–28. **Drive: 14 plays, 81 yards, 6:18.**

**Top passers**

- NO – Drew Brees – 27/37, 377 yards, 4 TD, INT
- TB – Josh Freeman – 24/42, 420 yards, 3 TD

**Top rushers**

- NO – Pierre Thomas – 13 rushes, 32 yards, TD
- TB – Doug Martin – 16 rushes, 85 yards, TD

**Top receivers**

- NO – Lance Moore – 9 receptions, 121 yards
- TB – Vincent Jackson – 7 receptions, 216 yards, TD

With the win, the Saints improved to 2–4. Also, QB Drew Brees increased his number of consecutive games with a touchdown pass to 49.

==== Week 8: at Denver Broncos ====
Week Seven: New Orleans Saints at Denver Broncos – Game summary

Quarter	1	2	3	4	Total
Saints	0	7	0	7	**14**
**Broncos**	7	10	7	10	**34**

at Sports Authority Field at Mile High, Denver, Colorado

- Date: October 28
- Game time: 7:20 p.m. CDT/6:20 p.m. MDT
- Game weather: 59 °F (15 °C), partly cloudy
- Game attendance: 76,832
- Referee: Mike Carey
- TV announcers (NBC): Al Michaels, Cris Collinsworth and Michele Tafoya

Game information

**First quarter**

- DEN – Willis McGahee 1-yard run (Matt Prater kick), 4:39. Broncos 7–0. **Drive: 11 plays, 98 yards, 4:39.**

**Second quarter**

- NO – Darren Sproles 29-yard pass from Drew Brees (Garrett Hartley kick), 14:53. Tied 7–7. **Drive: 4 plays, 55 yards, 1:53.**
- DEN – Eric Decker 13-yard pass from Peyton Manning (Matt Prater kick), 6:43. Broncos 14–7. **Drive: 5 plays, 56 yards, 2:17.**
- DEN – Matt Prater 33-yard field goal, 0:00. Broncos 17–7. **Drive: 11 plays, 72 yards, 4:24.**

**Third quarter**

- DEN – Demaryius Thomas 1-yard pass from Peyton Manning (Matt Prater kick), 9:30. Broncos 24–7. **Drive: 11 plays, 93 yards, 5:30.**

**Fourth quarter**

- DEN – Eric Decker 2-yard pass from Peyton Manning (Matt Prater kick), 14:54. Broncos 31–7. **Drive: 4 plays, 51 yards, 1:57.**
- DEN – Matt Prater 33-yard field goal, 5:27. Broncos 34–7. **Drive: 7 plays, 42 yards, 3:29.**
- NO – Jimmy Graham 18-yard pass from Drew Brees (Garrett Hartley kick), 2:03. Broncos 34–14. **Drive: 13 plays, 80 yards, 4:24.**

**Top passers**

- NO – Drew Brees – 22/42, 213 yards, 2 TD, INT
- DEN – Peyton Manning – 22/30, 305 yards, 3 TD

**Top rushers**

- NO – Pierre Thomas – 8 rushes, 43 yards
- DEN – Willis McGahee – 23 rushes, 122 yards, TD

**Top receivers**

- NO – Jimmy Graham – 5 receptions, 73 yards, TD
- DEN – Demaryius Thomas – 7 receptions, 137 yards, TD

With the loss, the Saints fell to 2–5. However, despite the loss, QB Drew Brees increased his record of consecutive games with a touchdown pass to 50.

==== Week 9: vs. Philadelphia Eagles ====
Week Nine: Philadelphia Eagles at New Orleans Saints – Game summary

Quarter	1	2	3	4	Total
Eagles	0	3	10	0	**13**
**Saints**	7	14	7	0	**28**

at Mercedes-Benz Superdome, New Orleans, Louisiana

- Date: November 5
- Game time: 7:30 p.m. CST
- Game weather: Played indoors (dome stadium)
- Game attendance: 73,099
- Referee: Clete Blakeman
- TV announcers (ESPN): Mike Tirico, Jon Gruden and Lisa Salters

Game information

**First quarter**

- NO – Patrick Robinson 99-yard interception return (Garrett Hartley kick), 2:36. Saints 7–0.

**Second quarter**

- PHI – Alex Henery 22-yard field goal, 12:03. Saints 7–3. **Drive: 11 plays, 76 yards, 5:33.**
- NO – Chris Ivory 22-yard run (Garrett Hartley kick), 8:33. Saints 14–3. **Drive: 7 plays, 76 yards, 3:30.**
- NO – Marques Colston 1-yard pass from Drew Brees (Garrett Hartley kick), 1:13. Saints 21–3. **Drive: 7 plays, 74 yards, 3:46.**

**Third quarter**

- PHI – DeSean Jackson 77-yard pass from Michael Vick (Alex Henery kick), 8:42. Saints 21–10. **Drive: 2 plays, 83 yards, 0:49.**
- PHI – Alex Henery 37-yard field goal, 7:00. Saints 21–13. **Drive: 5 plays, 3 yards, 1:34.**
- NO – Jimmy Graham 6-yard pass from Drew Brees (Garrett Hartley kick), 1:20. Saints 28–13. **Drive: 10 plays, 70 yards, 5:40.**

**Fourth quarter**

- No scoring plays.

**Top passers**

- PHI – Michael Vick – 22/41, 272 yards, TD, INT
- NO – Drew Brees – 21/27, 239 yards, 2 TD

**Top rushers**

- PHI – LeSean McCoy – 19 rushes, 119 yards
- NO – Chris Ivory – 10 rushes, 48 yards, TD

**Top receivers**

- PHI – DeSean Jackson – 3 receptions, 100 yards, TD
- NO – Jimmy Graham – 8 receptions, 72 yards, TD

With the win, the Saints improved to 3–5. Also, QB Drew Brees increased his streak of games with at least one passing touchdown to 51.

==== Week 10: vs. Atlanta Falcons ====
Week Ten: Atlanta Falcons at New Orleans Saints – Game summary

Quarter	1	2	3	4	Total
Falcons	10	7	0	10	**27**
**Saints**	7	14	7	3	**31**

at Mercedes-Benz Superdome, New Orleans, Louisiana

- Date: November 11
- Game time: 12:00 p.m. CST
- Game weather: Played indoors (dome stadium)
- Game attendance: 73,126
- Referee: Tony Corrente
- TV announcers (Fox): Kenny Albert, Daryl Johnston and Tony Siragusa

Game information

**First quarter**

- ATL – Mike Johnson 1-yard pass from Matt Ryan (Matt Bryant kick), 11:38. Falcons 7–0. **Drive: 7 plays, 80 yards, 3:22.**
- ATL – Matt Bryant 37-yard field goal, 9:19. Falcons 10–0. **Drive: 4 plays, 8 yards, 2:07.**
- NO – Chris Ivory 56-yard run (Garrett Hartley kick), 6:49. Falcons 10–7. **Drive: 6 plays, 78 yards, 2:30.**

**Second quarter**

- NO – Jimmy Graham 29-yard pass from Drew Brees (Garrett Hartley kick), 13:33. Saints 14–10. **Drive: 11 plays, 90 yards, 5:23.**
- ATL – Tony Gonzalez 2-yard pass from Matt Ryan (Matt Bryant kick), 6:27. Falcons 17–14. **Drive: 14 plays, 80 yards, 7:06.**
- NO – Jimmy Graham 14-yard pass from Drew Brees (Garrett Hartley kick), 0:34. Saints 21–17. **Drive: 8 plays, 69 yards, 1:43.**

**Third quarter**

- NO – Marques Colston 7-yard pass from Drew Brees (Garrett Hartley kick), 9:23. Saints 28–17. **Drive: 7 plays, 81 yards, 3:31.**

**Fourth quarter**

- ATL – Tony Gonzalez 6-yard pass from Matt Ryan (Matt Bryant kick), 13:27. Saints 28–24. **Drive: 12 plays, 91 yards, 5:46.**
- ATL – Matt Bryant 20-yard field goal, 9:08. Saints 28–27. **Drive: 6 plays, 62 yards, 2:42.**
- NO – Garrett Hartley 31-yard field goal, 5:54. Saints 31–27. **Drive: 9 plays, 67 yards, 3:14.**

**Top passers**

- ATL – Matt Ryan – 34/52, 411 yards, 3 TD, INT
- NO – Drew Brees – 21/32, 298 yards, 3 TD, INT

**Top rushers**

- ATL – Jacquizz Rodgers – 3 rushes, 29 yards
- NO – Chris Ivory – 7 rushes, 72 yards, TD

**Top receivers**

- ATL – Tony Gonzalez – 11 receptions, 122 yards, 2 TD
- NO – Jimmy Graham – 7 receptions, 146 yards, 2 TD

After their huge win over the Eagles, the Saints stayed home for a game against their heated rival Falcons. Sitting at 3–5, the Falcons came into this game at 8–0. The Saints surprisingly won their 4th-straight game against the Falcons and improved their record to 4–5 while the Falcons dropped to 8–1. Drew Brees brought his total of games with a passing touchdown to 52.

==== Week 11: at Oakland Raiders ====
Week Eleven: New Orleans Saints at Oakland Raiders – Game summary

Quarter	1	2	3	4	Total
**Saints**	14	7	14	3	**38**
Raiders	0	7	3	7	**17**

at O.co Coliseum, Oakland, California

- Date: November 18
- Game time: 3:05 p.m. CST/1:05 p.m. PST
- Game weather: 61 °F (16 °C), partly cloudy
- Game attendance: 56,880
- Referee: Pete Morelli
- TV announcers (Fox): Dick Stockton, John Lynch and Jennifer Hale

Game information

**First quarter**

- NO – Jimmy Graham 1-yard pass from Drew Brees (Garrett Hartley kick), 7:53. Saints 7–0. **Drive: 10 plays, 80 yards, 4:02.**
- NO – Malcolm Jenkins 55-yard interception return (Garrett Hartley kick), 4:06. Saints 14–0.

**Second quarter**

- OAK – Brandon Myers 1-yard pass from Carson Palmer (Sebastian Janikowski kick), 4:10. Saints 14–7. **Drive: 4 plays, 81 yards, 2:17.**
- NO – Lance Moore 38-yard pass from Drew Brees (Garrett Hartley kick), 0:48. Saints 21–7. **Drive: 8 plays, 90 yards, 3:22.**

**Third quarter**

- NO – Mark Ingram 27-yard run (Garrett Hartley kick), 14:43. Saints 28–7. **Drive: 1 play, 27 yards, 0:17.**
- OAK – Sebastian Janikowski 40-yard field goal, 10:22. Saints 28–10. **Drive: 10 plays, 54 yards, 4:21.**
- NO – Lance Moore 15-yard pass from Drew Brees (Garrett Hartley kick), 3:26. Saints 35–10. **Drive: 6 plays, 58 yards, 2:46.**

**Fourth quarter**

- NO – Garrett Hartley 47-yard field goal, 10:28. Saints 38–10. **Drive: 9 plays, 31 yards, 4:26.**
- OAK – Juron Criner 3-yard pass from Carson Palmer (Sebastian Janikowski kick), 4:00. Saints 38–17. **Drive: 7 plays, 93 yards, 2:03.**

**Top passers**

- NO – Drew Brees – 20/27, 219 yards, 3 TD
- OAK – Carson Palmer – 22/40, 312 yards, 2 TD, 2 INT

**Top rushers**

- NO – Mark Ingram – 12 rushes, 67 yards, TD
- OAK – Marcel Reece – 19 rushes, 103 yards

**Top receivers**

- NO – Marques Colston – 4 receptions, 69 yards
- OAK – Marcel Reece – 4 receptions, 90 yards

After 2 straight dominant home wins, the Saints traveled to Oakland to take on the Raiders. The Saints again dominated this game after the Raiders took the first points of the game. The Saints would win and improve to 5–5 on the season keeping their playoff hopes alive. Also Drew Brees brought his streak of at least 1 passing touchdown in a single game to 53.

==== Week 12: vs. San Francisco 49ers ====
Week Twelve: San Francisco 49ers at New Orleans Saints – Game summary

Quarter	1	2	3	4	Total
**49ers**	7	7	14	3	**31**
Saints	7	7	7	0	**21**

at Mercedes-Benz Superdome, New Orleans, Louisiana

- Date: November 25
- Game time: 3:25 p.m. CST
- Game weather: Played indoors (dome stadium)
- Game attendance: 73,147
- Referee: John Parry
- TV announcers (Fox): Joe Buck, Troy Aikman and Pam Oliver

Game information

**First quarter**

- SF – Colin Kaepernick 7-yard run (David Akers kick), 7:21. 49ers 7–0. **Drive: 4 plays, 62 yards, 2:06.**
- NO – David Thomas 6-yard pass from Drew Brees (Garrett Hartley kick), 1:45. Tied 7–7. **Drive: 10 plays, 79 yards, 5:36.**

**Second quarter**

- NO – Marques Colston 10-yard pass from Drew Brees (Garrett Hartley kick), 7:53. Saints 14–7. **Drive: 2 plays, 11 yards, 0:48.**
- SF – Ahmad Brooks 50-yard interception return (David Akers kick), 0:22. Tied 14–14.

**Third quarter**

- SF – Frank Gore 6-yard pass from Colin Kaepernick (David Akers kick), 12:17. 49ers 21–14. **Drive: 6 plays, 80 yards, 2:43.**
- SF – Donte Whitner 42-yard interception return (David Akers kick), 11:30. 49ers 28–14.
- NO – Jed Collins 2-yard pass from Drew Brees (Garrett Hartley kick), 7:19. 49ers 28–21. **Drive: 8 plays, 80 yards, 4:11.**

**Fourth quarter**

- SF – David Akers 27-yard field goal, 7:50. 49ers 31–21. **Drive: 16 plays, 84 yards, 9:28.**

**Top passers**

- SF – Colin Kaepernick: 16/25, 231 yards, TD, INT
- NO – Drew Brees: 26/41, 267 yards, 3 TD, 2 INT

**Top rushers**

- SF – Frank Gore: 19 rushes, 83 yards
- NO – Chris Ivory: 8 rushes, 34 yards

**Top receivers**

- SF – Delanie Walker: 3 receptions, 81 yards
- NO – Darren Sproles: 7 receptions, 65 yards

The loss dropped the team to 5–6, but Brees's record of games with at least 1 passing touchdown stood at 54. This loss was brought up by the ejection of nose tackle Brodrick Bunkley.

==== Week 13: at Atlanta Falcons ====
Week Thirteen: New Orleans Saints at Atlanta Falcons – Game summary

Quarter	1	2	3	4	Total
Saints	0	7	6	0	**13**
**Falcons**	7	10	0	6	**23**

at Georgia Dome, Atlanta, Georgia

- Date: November 29
- Game time: 8:20 p.m. EST/7:20 p.m. CST
- Game weather: Played indoors (dome stadium)
- Game attendance: 70,514
- Referee: Scott Green
- TV announcers (NFLN): Brad Nessler, Mike Mayock and Alex Flanagan

Game information

**First quarter**

- ATL – Michael Turner 3-yard run (Matt Bryant kick), 11:09. Falcons 7–0. **Drive: 6 plays, 80 yards, 3:51.**

**Second quarter**

- ATL – Tony Gonzalez 17-yard pass from Matt Ryan (Matt Bryant kick), 14:08. Falcons 14–0. **Drive: 5 plays, 49 yards, 2:28.**
- ATL – Matt Bryant 45-yard field goal, 8:53. Falcons 17–0. **Drive: 4 plays, 2 yards, 0:51.**
- NO – Mark Ingram 1-yard run (Garrett Hartley kick), 3:17. Falcons 17–7. **Drive: 11 plays, 80 yards, 5:36.**

**Third quarter**

- NO – Garrett Hartley 21-yard field goal, 8:24. Falcons 17–10. **Drive: 15 plays, 83 yards, 6:36.**
- NO – Garrett Hartley 52-yard field goal, 3:53. Falcons 17–13. **Drive: 8 plays, 36 yards, 2:49.**

**Fourth quarter**

- ATL – Matt Bryant 29-yard field goal, 14:48. Falcons 20–13. **Drive: 7 plays, 30 yards, 2:50.**
- ATL – Matt Bryant 55-yard field goal, 4:25. Falcons 23–13. **Drive: 11 plays, 43 yards, 5:38.**

**Top passers**

- NO – Drew Brees – 28/50, 341 yards, 5 INT
- ATL – Matt Ryan – 18/33, 165 yards, TD

**Top rushers**

- NO – Pierre Thomas – 14 rushes, 84 yards
- ATL – Michael Turner – 12 rushes, 83 yards, TD

**Top receivers**

- NO – Lance Moore – 7 receptions, 123 yards
- ATL – Tony Gonzalez – 4 receptions, 58 yards, TD

After the tough home loss to the Niners, the Saints traveled to take on the Falcons in a TNF matchup. The Saints' 4-game winning streak against the Falcons would be snapped as the team dropped to 5–7. Also, QB Drew Brees's streak of consecutive games with at least 1 passing touchdown would come to an end as he threw a career-high 5 interceptions in one game on the night. Regardless, his total passing touchdowns at this point was 31 bringing him his 5th straight season with 30+ passing touchdowns.

==== Week 14: at New York Giants ====
Week Fourteen: New Orleans Saints at New York Giants – Game summary

Quarter	1	2	3	4	Total
Saints	7	6	14	0	**27**
**Giants**	14	7	14	17	**52**

at MetLife Stadium, East Rutherford, New Jersey

- Date: December 9
- Game time: 4:25 p.m. EST/3:25 p.m. CST
- Game weather: 42 °F (6 °C), rain
- Game attendance: 81,437
- Referee: Jeff Triplette
- TV announcers (Fox): Joe Buck, Troy Aikman and Pam Oliver

Game information

**First quarter**

- NO – Elbert Mack 73-yard interception return (Garrett Hartley kick), 9:38. Saints 7–0.
- NYG – David Wilson 97-yard kickoff return (Lawrence Tynes kick), 9:25. Tied 7–7.
- NYG – Martellus Bennett 6-yard pass from Eli Manning (Lawrence Tynes kick), 4:19. Giants 14–7. **Drive: 4 plays, 35 yards, 2:24.**

**Second quarter**

- NO – Garrett Hartley 32-yard field goal, 9:46. Giants 14–10. **Drive: 14 plays, 81 yards, 5:44.**
- NO – Garrett Hartley 25-yard field goal, 1:57. Giants 14–13. **Drive: 8 plays, 67 yards, 4:06.**
- NYG – Domenik Hixon 5-yard pass from Eli Manning (Lawrence Tynes kick), 0:20. Giants 21–13. **Drive: 10 plays, 69 yards, 1:37.**

**Third quarter**

- NYG – David Wilson 6-yard run (Lawrence Tynes kick), 13:04. Giants 28–13. **Drive: 4 plays, 20 yards, 1:40.**
- NYG – Hakeem Nicks 25-yard pass from Eli Manning (Lawrence Tynes kick), 8:13. Giants 35–13. **Drive: 6 plays, 62 yards, 3:09.**
- NO – Darren Sproles 13-yard run (Lawrence Tynes kick), 7:21. Giants 35–20. **Drive: 3 plays, 75 yards, 0:52.**
- NO – Darren Sproles 9-yard pass from Drew Brees (Garrett Hartley kick), 1:51. Giants 35–27. **Drive: 6 plays, 68 yards, 3:09.**

**Fourth quarter**

- NYG – Victor Cruz 10-yard pass from Eli Manning (Lawrence Tynes kick), 14:20. Giants 42–27. **Drive: 5 plays, 25 yards, 2:31.**
- NYG – Lawrence Tynes 39-yard field goal, 10:19. Giants 45–27. **Drive: 4 plays, 2 yards, 1:31.**
- NYG – David Wilson 52-yard run (Lawrence Tynes kick), 5:10. Giants 52–27. **Drive: 1 play, 52 yards, 0:10.**

**Top passers**

- NO – Drew Brees – 26/43, 354 yards, TD, 2 INT
- NYG – Eli Manning – 22/35, 259 yards, 4 TD, 2 INT

**Top rushers**

- NO – Mark Ingram – 13 rushes, 68 yards
- NYG – David Wilson – 13 rushes, 100 yards, 2 TD

**Top receivers**

- NO – Joe Morgan – 2 receptions, 106 yards
- NYG – Victor Cruz – 8 receptions, 121 yards, TD

The Saints were dominated by the defending Super Bowl Champion New York Giants. They fell to 5-8 with the loss.

==== Week 15: vs. Tampa Bay Buccaneers ====
Week Fifteen: Tampa Bay Buccaneers at New Orleans Saints – Game summary

Quarter	1	2	3	4	Total
Buccaneers	0	0	0	0	**0**
**Saints**	7	17	7	10	**41**

at Mercedes-Benz Superdome, New Orleans, Louisiana

- Date: December 16
- Game time: 12:00 p.m. CST
- Game weather: Played indoors (dome stadium)
- Game attendance: 73,096
- Referee: Mike Carey
- TV announcers (Fox): Thom Brennaman, Brian Billick, and Laura Okmin

Game information

**First quarter**

- NO – David Thomas 9-yard pass from Drew Brees (Garrett Hartley kick), 11:12. Saints 7–0. **Drive: 7 plays, 74 yards, 3:48.**

**Second quarter**

- NO – Garrett Hartley 25-yard field goal, 13:23. Saints 10–0. **Drive: 11 plays, 74 yards, 5:23.**
- NO – Darren Sproles 2-yard pass from Drew Brees (Garrett Hartley kick), 4:57. Saints 17–0. **Drive: 8 plays, 51 yards, 4:26.**
- NO – Lance Moore 7-yard pass from Drew Brees (Garrett Hartley kick), 0:09. Saints 24–0. **Drive: 5 plays, 38 yards, 0:55.**

**Third quarter**

- NO – Joe Morgan 34-yard pass from Drew Brees (Garrett Hartley kick), 9:05. Saints 31–0. **Drive: 8 plays, 92 yards, 4:24.**

**Fourth quarter**

- NO – Garrett Hartley 36-yard field goal, 8:09. Saints 34–0. **Drive: 8 plays, 63 yards, 2:46.**
- NO – Mark Ingram 11-yard run (Garrett Hartley kick), 4:54. Saints 41–0. **Drive: 3 plays, 43 yards, 1:32.**

**Top passers**

- TB – Josh Freeman – 26/47, 279 yards, 4 INT
- NO – Drew Brees – 26/39, 307 yards, 4 TD

**Top rushers**

- TB – LeGarrette Blount – 4 rushes, 25 yards
- NO – Mark Ingram – 14 rushes, 90 yards, TD

**Top receivers**

- TB – Vincent Jackson – 6 receptions, 81 yards
- NO – Jimmy Graham – 5 receptions, 69 yards

With the win, the Saints improved to 6–8 and swept the Buccaneers for the first time since 2006 and posted their first shutout win since 1995 to the New York Jets 12–0. The Saints did not post another shutout until 2021, when they beat the Buccaneers 9-0. This is also the Saints' largest margin of victory over the Buccaneers in franchise history.

==== Week 16: at Dallas Cowboys ====
Week Sixteen: New Orleans Saints at Dallas Cowboys – Game summary

Quarter	1	2	3	4	OT	Total
**Saints**	7	10	7	7	3	**34**
Cowboys	0	14	3	14	0	**31**

at Cowboys Stadium, Arlington, Texas

- Date: December 23
- Game time: 12:00 p.m. CST
- Game weather: Played indoors (retractable roof closed)
- Game attendance: 92,570
- Referee: Walt Coleman
- TV announcers (Fox): Kenny Albert, Daryl Johnston and Tony Siragusa

Game information

**First quarter**

- NO – Mark Ingram 9-yard run (Garrett Hartley kick), 10:25. Saints 7–0. **Drive: 10 plays, 80 yards, 4:35.**

**Second quarter**

- DAL – Dez Bryant 58-yard pass from Tony Romo (Dan Bailey kick), 12:47. Tied 7–7. **Drive: 3 plays, 74 yards, 1:28.**
- DAL – Dez Bryant 58-yard pass from Tony Romo (Dan Bailey kick), 5:43. Cowboys 14–7. **Drive: 5 plays, 75 yards, 3:23.**
- NO – Lance Moore 6-yard pass from Drew Brees (Garrett Hartley kick), 1:11. Tied 14–14. **Drive: 12 plays, 90 yards, 4:32.**
- NO – Garrett Hartley 37-yard field goal, 0:00. Saints 17–14. **Drive: 5 plays, 51 yards, 0:47.**

**Third quarter**

- DAL – Dan Bailey 47-yard field goal, 10:26. Tied 17–17. **Drive: 9 plays, 47 yards, 4:34.**
- NO – Pierre Thomas 5-yard pass from Drew Brees (Garrett Hartley kick), 4:03. Saints 24–17. **Drive: 3 plays, 5 yards, 0:14.**

**Fourth quarter**

- NO – David Thomas 3-yard pass from Drew Brees (Garrett Hartley kick), 11:10. Saints 31–17. **Drive: 10 plays, 98 yards, 4:53.**
- DAL – Dwayne Harris 16-yard pass from Tony Romo (Dan Bailey kick), 3:35. Saints 31–24. **Drive: 5 plays, 80 yards, 1:10.**
- DAL – Miles Austin 19-yard pass from Tony Romo (Dan Bailey kick), 0:15. Tied 31–31. **Drive: 7 plays, 64 yards, 1:14.**

**Overtime**

- NO – Garrett Hartley 20-yard field goal, 10:33. Saints 34–31. **Drive: 7 plays, 72 yards, 3:00.**

**Top passers**

- NO – Drew Brees – 37/53, 446 yards, 3 TD
- DAL – Tony Romo – 26/43, 416 yards, 4 TD

**Top rushers**

- NO – Mark Ingram II – 21 rushes, 53 yards, TD
- DAL – DeMarco Murray – 11 rushes, 40 yards

**Top receivers**

- NO – Marques Colston – 11 receptions, 153 yards
- DAL – Dez Bryant – 9 receptions, 224 yards, 2 TD

With the win, the Saints improved to 7–8. However, the Saints were eliminated from postseason contention, thus rendering them unable to play Super Bowl XLVII on their own home turf.

==== Week 17: vs. Carolina Panthers ====
Week Seventeen: Carolina Panthers at New Orleans Saints – Game summary

Quarter	1	2	3	4	Total
**Panthers**	3	10	14	17	**44**
Saints	0	17	7	14	**38**

at Mercedes-Benz Superdome, New Orleans, Louisiana

- Date: December 30
- Game time: 12:00 p.m. CST
- Game weather: Played indoors (dome stadium)
- Game attendance: 73,124
- Referee: Alberto Riveron
- TV announcers (Fox): Ron Pitts, Mike Martz and Krista Voda

Game information

**First quarter**

- CAR – Graham Gano 20-yard field goal, 5:41. Panthers 7–0. **Drive: 15 plays, 76 yards, 7:06.**

**Second quarter**

- CAR – Mike Tolbert 1-yard run (Graham Gano kick), 8:18. Panthers 10–0. **Drive: 3 plays, 82 yards, 1:12.**
- NO – Marques Colston 7-yard pass from Drew Brees (Garrett Hartley kick), 5:14. Panthers 10–7. **Drive: 7 plays, 76 yards, 3:04.**
- NO – Jonathan Vilma 18-yard interception return (Garrett Hartley kick), 4:31. Saints 14–10.
- CAR – Graham Gano 30-yard field goal, 0:39. Saints 14–13. **Drive: 9 plays, 60 yards, 3:52.**
- NO – Garrett Hartley 53-yard field goal, 0:00. Saints 17–13. **Drive: 5 plays, 47 yards, 0:39.**

**Third quarter**

- NO – Jimmy Graham 19-yard pass from Drew Brees (Garrett Hartley kick), 10:45. Saints 24–13. **Drive: 8 plays, 80 yards, 4:15.**
- CAR – DeAngelo Williams 54-yard run (Graham Gano kick), 8:48. Saints 24–20. **Drive: 4 plays, 80 yards, 1:57.**
- CAR – Mike Tolbert 1-yard run (Graham Gano kick), 2:29. Panthers 27–24. **Drive: 3 plays, 36 yards, 1:18.**

**Fourth quarter**

- CAR – Mike Tolbert 1-yard run (Graham Gano kick), 10:16. Panthers 34–24. **Drive: 9 plays, 80 yards, 4:36.**
- CAR – DeAngelo Williams 12-yard run (Graham Gano kick), 8:23. Panthers 41–24. **Drive: 1 play, 12 yards, 0:06.**
- NO – Marques Colston 19-yard pass from Drew Brees (Garrett Hartley kick), 5:10. Panthers 41–31. **Drive: 10 plays, 81 yards, 3:13.**
- CAR – Graham Gano 42-yard field goal, 4:08. Panthers 44–31. **Drive: 4 plays, 5 yards, 1:02.**
- NO – Darren Sproles 33-yard pass from Drew Brees, 2:52. Panthers 44–38. **Drive: 4 plays, 80 yards, 1:16.**

**Top passers**

- CAR – Cam Newton – 16/33, 248 yards, INT
- NO – Drew Brees – 29/43, 396 yards, 3 TD, INT

**Top rushers**

- CAR – DeAngelo Williams – 21 rushes, 210 yards, 2 TD
- NO – Mark Ingram – 10 carries, 39 yards

**Top receivers**

- CAR – Steve Smith Sr. – 3 receptions, 73 yards
- NO – Lance Moore – 4 receptions, 121 yards

With the loss, the Saints finished with their first losing season since 2007 at 7–9. Also, the team was swept by the Panthers for the first time since 2008.

== Standings ==
NFC South
	W	L	T	PCT	DIV	CONF	PF	PA	STK
^{(1)} Atlanta Falcons	13	3	0	.813	3–3	9–3	419	299	L1
Carolina Panthers	7	9	0	.438	3–3	5–7	357	363	W4
New Orleans Saints	7	9	0	.438	3–3	5–7	461	454	L1
Tampa Bay Buccaneers	7	9	0	.438	3–3	4–8	389	394	W1
