= Darren Sproles =

American football player (born 1983)

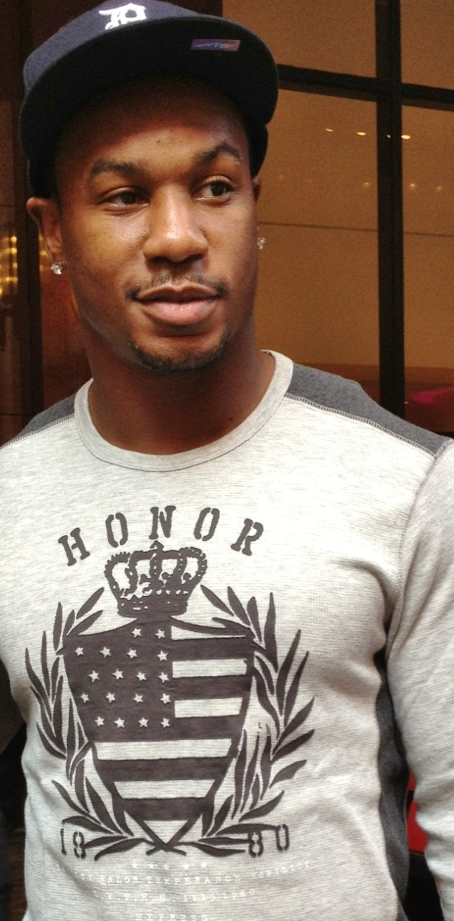
- Sproles in 2011

Houston Texans
- Title: Coaching intern

Personal information
- Born: June 20, 1983 (age 43); Waterloo, Iowa, U.S.
- Listed height: 5 ft 6 in (1.68 m)
- Listed weight: 190 lb (86 kg)

Career information
- High school: Olathe North (Olathe, Kansas)
- College: Kansas State (2001–2004)
- NFL draft: 2005: 4th round, 130th overall pick

Career history

Playing
- San Diego Chargers (2005–2010); New Orleans Saints (2011–2013); Philadelphia Eagles (2014–2019)

Coaching
- Houston Texans Bill Walsh minority coaching fellowship (2026–present)

Operations
- Philadelphia Eagles (2020–2025) Personnel consultant

Awards and highlights
- As a player: Super Bowl champion (LII); Second-team All-Pro (2014) (Note: Selected as a Return Specialist); 3× Pro Bowl (2014–2016); 2× NFL 2010s All-Decade Team (Note: Selected as flex and punt returner); San Diego Chargers 50th Anniversary Team; First-team All-American (2003); NCAA rushing yards leader (2003); 2× First-team All-Big 12 (2003, 2004); Second-team All-Big 12 (2002); NFL record: Most all-purpose yards in a season: 2,696 (2011); As a staff member / executive: Super Bowl champion (LIX)

Career NFL statistics
- Rushing attempts: 732
- Rushing yards: 3,552
- Rushing touchdowns: 23
- Receptions: 553
- Receiving yards: 4,840
- Receiving touchdowns: 32
- Return yards: 11,313
- Return touchdowns: 9
- Stats at Pro Football Reference
- College Football Hall of Fame

Darren Lee Sproles (born June 20, 1983) is an American professional football executive and former running back. He is currently serving as a coaching intern for the Houston Texans of the National Football League (NFL). He played college football for the Kansas State Wildcats, earning first-team All-American honors and becoming the school's all-time leading rusher. Sproles was selected by the San Diego Chargers in the fourth round of the 2005 NFL draft. He also played for the New Orleans Saints and the Philadelphia Eagles. He was inducted into the College Football Hall of Fame in 2021.

Sproles was named as a kick returner on the Chargers 50th Anniversary Team. He joined the New Orleans Saints in free agency before the 2011 season. He holds the NFL record for most single-season all-purpose yardage, with 2,696 yards in 2011. During that season, he set career highs with 603 yards rushing (6.9 yards per carry) and 710 yards receiving and a combined total of nine touchdowns. Sproles is the only player in NFL history with 2,200+ all-purpose yards in four different seasons, accomplished in four consecutive years (2008–2011). He shares the record for most receptions in a playoff game with 15. He is ranked 6th in career all-purpose yards in NFL history (19,696 yards).

== Early life ==
Born in Waterloo, Iowa. Sproles attended Olathe North High School in Olathe, Kansas. He has been conquering a speech impediment he has had since childhood. Sproles was a star in football, earning the name "Tank", after having been born at 10 lb (4.5 kg). For two consecutive years, he was an All-Sunflower League honoree, All-Metro honoree, and an All-State selection. Additionally, he was twice named The Kansas City Star Player of the Year. As a senior, he was named the Kansas Hall of Fame Player of the Year and the USA Today Kansas Player of the Year. Throughout his high school career, Sproles rushed for 5,230 yards, averaging nearly 8.4 yards per carry and 79 touchdowns.

Sproles was a high school All-American as selected by Student Sports Magazine. He was also the winner of Simone Trophy, given to the top big-class football player in Kansas City metro area. In 1999, he rushed for 2,031 yards in nine games as a junior. In 2000, during his senior year, Sproles rushed for 2,485 yards, scoring 49 touchdowns. He led his Olathe North Eagles to a 12–0 record and their fourth Kansas 6A state title in five years.

=== Track and field ===
In addition to football, Sproles was a track star at Olathe North. He finished 2nd in the state in the 200 meters as a junior, with a time of 21.6 seconds. He also placed 4th at Class 6A States in 100 meters, with a time of 10.93 seconds, and 3rd in the 200 meters, with a time of 22.04 seconds.

Sproles has achieved personal bests of 10.6 seconds in the 100 meters and 21.6 seconds in the 200 meters.

== College career ==
Sproles played college football at Kansas State University from 2001 to 2004, starting all games in his last two seasons and setting 23 school records. In the 2001 season, he made his collegiate debut against New Mexico State and had four carries for 49 yards and a touchdown. He finished with 28 carries for 210 rushing yards and one touchdown in six games.

In the 2002 season, Sproles's role in the offense expanded. In the season opener against Western Kentucky, he had 135 rushing yards and a rushing touchdown. On October 5, in the game at Colorado, he had 121 rushing yards and three rushing touchdowns. On November 2, against Kansas, he had 110 rushing yards and two rushing touchdowns. He followed that up with 103 rushing yards and two rushing touchdowns against Iowa State. In the next game, against Nebraska, he had 159 rushing yards and three rushing touchdowns. Overall, in the 2002 season, he finished with 1,465 rushing yards and 17 rushing touchdowns.

In the 2003 season, Sproles continued to produce greatly for the Wildcats. In the season opener against California, he had 175 rushing yards and a rushing touchdown. On September 13, against Massachusetts, he had 152 rushing yards and three rushing touchdowns to help get the Wildcats to a 4–0 start. On November 8, in a game at Iowa State, he had 201 rushing yards and three rushing touchdowns. On November 22, against Missouri, he had 43 carries for 273 rushing yards and two rushing touchdowns. In the Big 12 Conference championship in 2003, a 35–7 win over #1 ranked Oklahoma, he had 235 rushing yards and 88 receiving yards and a receiving touchdown. Overall, he finished the 2003 season with 16 rushing touchdowns and an NCAA-leading 1,986 rushing yards. That same year, he finished fifth in the Heisman Trophy voting. He graduated with a degree in speech pathology. He led all FBS teams in rushing yards in 2003 with 1,986.

Sproles started the 2004 season off strong with 42 carries for 221 yards and a touchdown in a victory over Western Kentucky. On September 18, against Louisiana–Lafayette, he had 292 rushing yards and a touchdown. On October 23, against Nebraska, he had 135 rushing yards and two rushing touchdowns. On November 6, against Missouri, he had 160 rushing yards and two rushing touchdowns. In the final game of his collegiate career, against Iowa State, he had 167 rushing yards and a rushing touchdown. Overall, he finished the 2004 season with 1,318 rushing yards and 11 touchdowns.

Sproles finished 11th on the all-time college rushing yards list, with the 6th most all-purpose yards in NCAA history.

Sproles was inducted to the Kansas State Athletics Hall of Fame, leading the class of 2021.

== Professional career ==
Pre-draft measurables
| Height | Weight | Arm length | Hand span | 40-yard dash | 10-yard split | 20-yard split | 20-yard shuttle | Three-cone drill | Vertical jump | Broad jump | Bench press | Wonderlic |
|---|---|---|---|---|---|---|---|---|---|---|---|---|
| 5 ft 6 1/8 in (1.68 m) | 187 lb (85 kg) | 28 1/4 in (0.72 m) | 8 1/4 in (0.21 m) | 4.46 s | 1.52 s | 2.58 s | 3.96 s | 6.96 s | 33 in (0.84 m) | 8 ft 9 in (2.67 m) | 23 reps | 21 |
All values from NFL Combine

=== San Diego Chargers ===
==== 2005/2006 seasons ====
Sproles was drafted by the Chargers in the fourth round of the 2005 NFL draft with the 130th overall pick.

Sproles spent the 2005 season as the third string running back, behind LaDainian Tomlinson and Michael Turner, returning kicks and punts. He then spent the entire 2006 season on injured reserve list after breaking his ankle during the preseason.

==== 2007 season ====
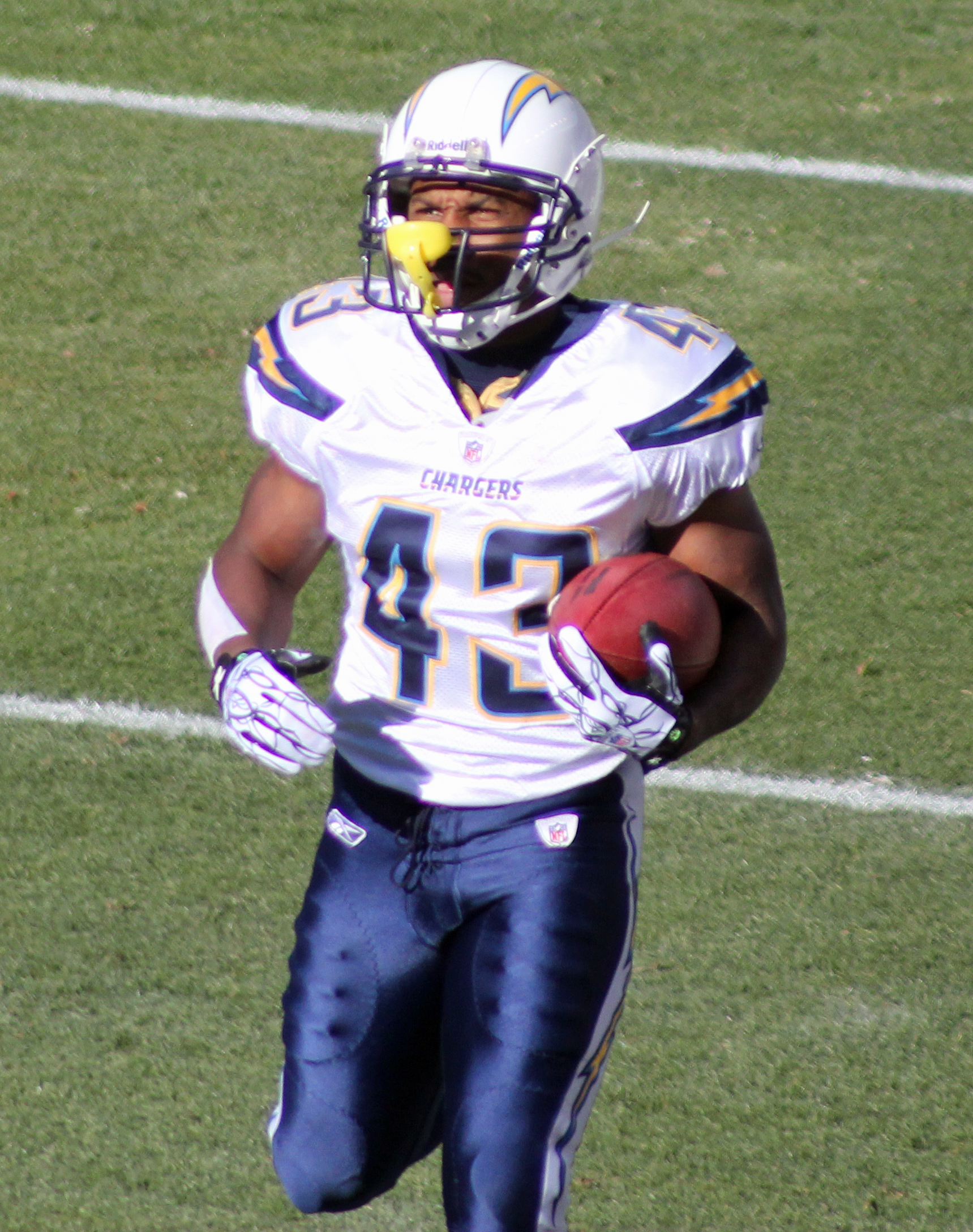
Sproles with the Chargers in January 2011

On November 11, 2007, in the Chargers' 23–21 upset over the Indianapolis Colts, Sproles made history by returning a kickoff and a punt for his first two NFL touchdowns—the first player in league history ever to do so. He returned the opening kickoff 89 yards for the game's first score. After Nate Kaeding's field goal increased the Chargers' lead to 10–0, Sproles returned a Hunter Smith punt 46 yards for another touchdown for a 16–0 lead. Sproles became the first player to return a kickoff and a punt for a touchdown in the same game since Dante Hall did so in 2003.

On December 16, 2007, Sproles ran one yard for his first career rushing touchdown against the Detroit Lions. This was followed by an 11-yard run for his second rushing touchdown, capping off his first career 100+ yard rushing game. Overall, he finished the 2007 regular season with 164 rushing yards and two rushing touchdowns to go along with 10 receptions for 31 yards. On special teams, he had 37 kick returns for 1,008 net yards and a touchdown to go along with 24 punt returns for 229 net yards and a touchdown. The Chargers made the playoffs in 2007. In the Divisional Round against the Indianapolis Colts, he had a 56-yard receiving touchdown in the 28–24 victory. He had 34 rushing yards in the AFC Championship loss to the New England Patriots in the next round.

==== 2008 season ====
On September 14, 2008, Sproles became just the second player in NFL history with 50 rushing yards, 50 receiving yards, and 100 return yards in one game (the other being Gale Sayers with the Chicago Bears). His statistics for the game included: 53 rushing yards, 72 receiving yards, and 192 return yards. Sproles logged 317 all-purpose yards in a 39–38 loss to the Denver Broncos. He also had a 103-yard touchdown return. On December 4, he had three receptions for 34 yards and two touchdowns in a 34–7 victory over the Oakland Raiders. In the regular season finale, in the second divisional game against the Denver Broncos, he had 115 rushing yards and his lone rushing touchdown of the regular season. Overall, he finished the 2008 season with 330 rushing yards, one rushing touchdown, and 29 receptions for 342 receiving yards and five receiving touchdowns. On special teams, he had 53 kick returns for 1,376 net yards and a touchdown to go along with 22 punt returns for 249 net yards.

On January 3, 2009, during an AFC Wild Card Round game against the Indianapolis Colts, Sproles ran for two touchdowns in place of the injured LaDainian Tomlinson, including the game-winning touchdown in overtime to beat the Colts 23–17. With 105 yards rushing, 45 yards receiving and 178 return yards, Sproles finished the game with 328 all-purpose yards in the Chargers victory over the Colts, the third most all-purpose yards by a player in a single NFL post-season game in NFL history. He was named the NBC Sunday Night Football "Horse Trailer Player of the Game" for the second consecutive week. The week following however, Sproles was stopped by the Pittsburgh Steelers. He managed only 15 yards on 11 carries, but did have 5 receptions for 91 yards including a 62-yard touchdown.

==== 2009 season ====
On February 18, 2009, the Chargers placed their franchise tag on Sproles. He signed the tender on April 28, 2009, which was worth $6.621 million. In Week 2, against the Baltimore Ravens, he had seven receptions for 124 yards in the 31–26 loss. On October 19, he had a 77-yard punt return for a touchdown in a 34–23 loss to the Denver Broncos. On Christmas Day, he had 38 rushing yards and two rushing touchdowns in a 42–17 victory over the Tennessee Titans. Overall, in the 2009 regular season, he finished with 343 rushing yards, three rushing touchdowns, 45 receptions, 497 receiving yards, and four receiving touchdowns. On special teams, he had 54 kick returns for 1,300 net yards and 26 punt returns for 183 net yards and a touchdown.

==== 2010 season ====
On March 4, 2010, it was reported that the Chargers would tender Sproles a contract, which was worth approximately $7.3 million. Another team would have had to give the Chargers first- and third-round draft picks if they signed Sproles. He appeared in all 16 games and recorded 59 receptions for 520 yards and two touchdowns to go along with 50 carries for 267 rushing yards. On special teams, he had 51 kick returns for 1,257 net yards and 24 punt returns for 166 net yards.

=== New Orleans Saints ===
==== 2011 season ====
On July 29, 2011, Sproles signed a four-year contract worth $14 million with the New Orleans Saints. The contract included $6 million in guaranteed money.

On September 8, 2011, during a game against the Green Bay Packers, Sproles returned a punt 72 yards for a touchdown during the second quarter, and returned a second punt for 20 yards; he also had 2 kick-off returns for 83 yards, including a 57-yard return. That gave Sproles 175 yards of returning on special teams, and on offense, he had seven receptions for 75 yards, along with just two carries for seven yards, totaling 257 all-purpose yards.

On September 25, 2011, during a game against the Houston Texans, Sproles had 193 all-purpose yards (108 special teams yards and 85 offensive yards), with six receptions for 50 yards, two carries for 35 yards, including a 30-yard touchdown run, and on special teams, had four kick-off returns for 103 yards.

On October 23, 2011, during a game against the Indianapolis Colts, Darren Sproles had 190 all-purpose yards with two touchdowns. On special teams, he had six returns for 83 yards. On offense, he had 12 carries for 88 yards with a 16-yard touchdown run, and six receptions for 19 yards with a six-yard touchdown pass. During this game, Sproles broke over 1,000 all-purpose yards mark.

On December 26, 2011, during a game against the Atlanta Falcons, Sproles had 236 all-purpose yards. On special teams, he had four kick-off returns for 147 yards, including a 92-yard return in which he almost returned the football to the house, and on offense, he had just 89 yards of total offense, with five carries for 67 yards, two receptions for 22 yards but with a nine-yard touchdown pass from Drew Brees. This last-play touchdown pass in the fourth quarter helped Drew Brees break the single season record for passing yards (5,084), held by Dan Marino since 1984. That pass gave Brees 5,087 yards for the 2011 regular season with one game remaining.

On January 1, 2012, in the last regular season game, a 45–17 blowout of the Carolina Panthers, Sproles had 168 all-purpose yards, in which he had five returns for 99 yards on special teams, and broke the NFL record for all-purpose yards in a season (2,696). Sproles played in both of the Saints' playoff games, scoring three touchdowns, including a 44-yard catch and run in the fourth quarter of a celebrated back-and-forth contest against the San Francisco 49ers that the Saints ultimately lost 36–32. Sproles set a record for most catches in a playoff game; his record was matched by James White in 2019.

Sproles broke over 1,000 all-purpose yards in only his seventh game as a Saint. Maintaining an average of 168.5 all purpose yards per game Sproles finished the 2011 season with 2,696 all-purpose yards, breaking the NFL single-season record, previously set in 2000 by Derrick Mason (2,690 yards). He was ranked 86th by his fellow players on the NFL Top 100 Players of 2012.

==== 2012 season ====
In Week 2, a 35–27 loss to the Carolina Panthers, Sproles had 13 receptions for 128 yards. On November 2, 2012, Saints interim head coach Joe Vitt announced that Sproles would be out indefinitely due to a fractured hand. Sproles returned in Week 12 and played in the Saints' remaining games, finishing the season with 48 rushes for 244 yards and one touchdown, 75 catches for 667 yards and seven touchdowns, 18 kickoff returns for 483 yards, and 23 punt returns for 183 yards.

==== 2013 season ====
In 2013, Sproles played in 15 regular season games, running for 220 yards and two touchdowns on 53 carries, making 71 catches for 604 yards and two touchdowns, 12 kickoff returns for 225 yards, and 29 punt returns for 194 yards. He played in both of the Saints' playoff games, with seven runs for 31 yards and nine catches for 63 yards.

=== Philadelphia Eagles ===
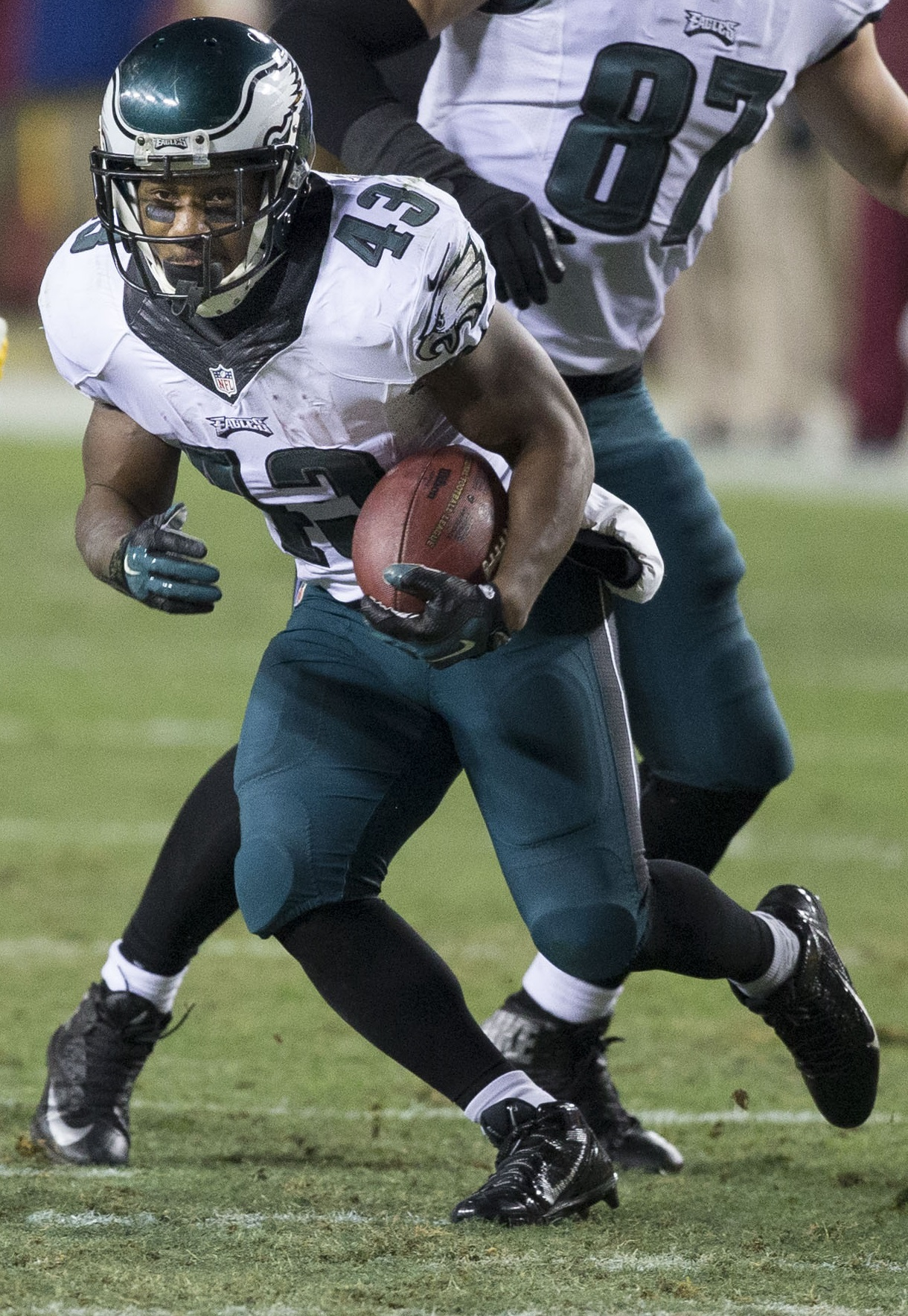
Sproles with the Eagles in 2014

==== 2014 season ====
On March 13, 2014, Sproles was acquired by the Philadelphia Eagles in exchange for a 2014 5th-round draft pick. Drew Brees was quoted after the trade: "You only see a Darren Sproles type of player come around once in your career".

In his first regular season game with the Eagles, against the Jacksonville Jaguars, he had 11 carries for a total of 71 yards and had one rushing touchdown (49 yards, which was the longest run of his career). He won NFC Offensive Player of the Week in Week 2 against the Indianapolis Colts, rushing for 26 yards and a touchdown on four carries and catching seven receptions for 152 yards, two of which were over 50 yards. He earned NFC Special Teams Player of the Week for performances in Week 4 and Week 10.

In 2014, Sproles played in 15 regular season games, running for 329 yards and six touchdowns on 57 carries, making 40 catches for 387 yards, one kickoff return for 15 yards, and 39 punt returns for 506 yards and two touchdowns, good for second place on the Eagles' all-time single-season punt return yards, and the most in the NFL in 2014. For his efforts, he was elected to his first career Pro Bowl. He was named second team All-Pro as a return specialist, his first time on an All-Pro team. He was ranked 81st by his fellow players on the NFL Top 100 Players of 2015.

==== 2015 season ====
Starting the 2015 season, much hype surrounded the Eagles signing reigning rushing champion DeMarco Murray and San Diego starter Ryan Mathews, leading to speculation that Sproles would get less playing time. In the season opener against the Atlanta Falcons, Sproles rushed for 50 yards on five attempts and caught seven passes for 76 yards, as well as returning 3 punts for 25 yards. Meanwhile, Murray and Mathews rushed for a combined 11 carries and 13 yards, although they each scored a touchdown rushing while Sproles did not.

In Week 3, DeMarco Murray did not play due to injury, but the Eagles running game prospered under Mathews and Sproles. Sproles was named NFC Special Teams player of the week for returning a punt 89 yards for the touchdown. He also rushed for 17 yards and one touchdown, helping the Eagles win their first game of the season against the 2-0 New York Jets, 24–17.

Sproles was given his largest workload since the 2009 season in a Week 13 game against the 10-1 New England Patriots, due to the ineffectiveness of Murray and Mathews being hurt. Sproles had 15 carries for 66 yards, four catches for 34 yards, and five punt returns for 115 yards and a touchdown in the 35–28 upset win. Sproles followed it up with a solid game against the Buffalo Bills, with seven carries for 41 yards and a touchdown in the 23–20 win.

Sproles finished the regular season with three rushing touchdowns, one receiving touchdown, and two punt return touchdowns, leading the NFL for the second consecutive year. Sproles was selected to his second straight Pro Bowl, and was named First Team All-Pro, his second straight year as an All-Pro and his first first-team selection.

==== 2016 season ====
On July 29, 2016, Sproles signed a one-year $4.5 million contract extension with the Eagles through 2017. Sproles was an immediate weapon out of the backfield, catching 10 passes for 160 yards and a touchdown in the first three games of the season, however he was also held to only 51 yards on 19 carries rushing in that same timespan. In a Week 8 loss to the Dallas Cowboys, Sproles took over as the lead back, carrying the ball 15 times for 86 yards and catching 5 passes for 17 yards. Sproles would retain the lead back role the following week against the New York Giants, rushing 13 times for 57 yards, catching three passes for 14 yards, and gaining 76 yards on two punt returns. On November 7, the day after the Giants game, head coach Doug Pederson officially named Sproles as the starting back. Overall, he finished the 2016 season with 438 rushing yards, two rushing touchdowns, 52 receptions, 427 receiving yards, and two receiving touchdowns. He earned a third consecutive Pro Bowl nomination.

==== 2017 season ====
On September 25, 2017, it was revealed that Sproles suffered a broken arm and a torn ACL on the same play in a game against the New York Giants in Week 3. He was officially placed on injured reserve that day, prematurely ending his season. In three games, he rushed 15 times for 61 yards with seven receptions for 73 yards. In Sproles absence, the Eagles would go on to win Super Bowl LII. After the season ended, Sproles stated his interest to return to the Eagles for one more season.

==== 2018 season ====
On April 28, 2018, Sproles re-signed with the Eagles on a one-year contract. On July 15, 2018, Sproles announced that 2018 will be his last NFL season. He returned from his injury to play in the season-opening 18–12 victory over the Atlanta Falcons. His return from injury was short-lived as he injured his hamstring in practice before the Week 2 game against the Tampa Bay Buccaneers. He returned in Week 13 to face the Washington Redskins and scored a rushing touchdown. In the following game, against the Dallas Cowboys, he scored a receiving touchdown. He added another receiving touchdown against the Houston Texans in Week 16. Overall, he finished the 2018 season with 120 rushing yards, one rushing touchdown, 160 receiving yards, and two receiving touchdowns. In the Wild Card round against the Chicago Bears, he had 21 rushing yards and 14 receiving yards in the 16–15 victory. In the Divisional Round loss to the New Orleans Saints, he had four rushing yards and 21 receiving yards.

==== 2019 season ====
Sproles re-signed with the Eagles on a one-year contract on July 19, 2019. In Week 5, against the New York Jets, he moved into 5th all-time on the all-purpose yards list, passing Tim Brown. However Sproles suffered a partially torn right hip flexor muscle and missed the next three games. He returned in Week 9, but further aggravated the injury. He was later revealed that he fully tore the muscle and was ruled out the rest of the season. He was placed on injured reserve on November 15. On December 21, 2019, Sproles announced that he would retire from the NFL following the 2019 season. Sproles was named to the Pro Football Hall of Fame All-2010s Team.

== Career statistics ==
=== NFL ===
| Year | Team | Games | | Receiving | | | | | Rushing | | | | | Punt return | | | | | Kick return | | | | | Fumbles | |
| Year | Team | GP | GS | Rec | Yds | Avg | Lng | TD | Att | Yds | Avg | Lng | TD | Ret | Yds | Avg | Lng | TD | Ret | Yds | Avg | Lng | TD | Fum | Lost |
|---|---|---|---|---|---|---|---|---|---|---|---|---|---|---|---|---|---|---|---|---|---|---|---|---|---|
| 2005 | SD | 15 | 0 | 3 | 10 | 3.3 | 6 | 0 | 8 | 50 | 6.3 | 21 | 0 | 18 | 108 | 6.0 | 23 | 0 | **63** | **1,528** | 24.3 | 58 | 0 | 3 | 2 |
| 2006 | SD | Did not play due to injury | | | | | | | | | | | | | | | | | | | | | | | |
| 2007 | SD | 15 | 0 | 10 | 31 | 3.1 | 14 | 0 | 37 | 164 | 4.4 | 34 | 2 | 24 | 229 | 9.5 | 45T | 1 | 37 | 1,008 | **27.2** | 89T | **1** | 1 | 0 |
| 2008 | SD | **16** | 0 | 29 | 342 | **11.8** | 66T | 5 | 61 | 330 | 5.4 | 37 | 1 | 22 | 249 | 11.3 | 43 | 0 | 53 | 1,376 | 26.0 | **103T** | **1** | 3 | 2 |
| 2009 | SD | **16** | 2 | 45 | 497 | 11.0 | **81T** | 4 | 93 | 343 | 3.7 | 21 | 3 | 26 | 183 | 7.0 | 77T | 1 | 54 | 1,300 | 24.1 | 66 | 0 | 3 | 1 |
| 2010 | SD | **16** | 3 | 59 | 520 | 8.8 | 57T | 2 | 50 | 267 | 5.3 | 34 | 0 | 24 | 166 | 6.9 | 16 | 0 | 51 | 1,257 | 24.6 | 45 | 0 | 3 | **3** |
| 2011 | NO | **16** | 4 | **86** | **710** | 8.3 | 39 | **7** | 87 | **603** | **6.9** | 36 | 2 | 29 | 294 | 10.1 | 72T | 1 | 40 | 1,088 | 27.2 | 92 | 0 | 0 | 0 |
| 2012 | NO | 13 | 4 | 75 | 667 | 8.9 | 44 | **7** | 48 | 244 | 5.1 | 47 | 1 | 23 | 183 | 8.0 | 37 | 0 | 18 | 483 | 26.8 | 48 | 0 | 0 | 0 |
| 2013 | NO | 15 | 4 | 71 | 604 | 8.5 | 48 | 2 | 53 | 220 | 4.2 | 38 | 2 | 29 | 194 | 6.7 | 28 | 0 | 12 | 255 | 21.3 | 32 | 0 | 2 | 2 |
| 2014 | PHI | 15 | 0 | 40 | 387 | 9.7 | 57 | 0 | 57 | 329 | 5.8 | **49T** | **6** | **39** | **509** | 13.0 | 82T | **2** | 1 | 15 | 15.0 | 15 | 0 | **4** | 1 |
| 2015 | PHI | **16** | 4 | 55 | 388 | 7.1 | 35 | 1 | 83 | 317 | 3.8 | 27 | 3 | 38 | 446 | 11.7 | **89T** | **2** | 1 | 20 | 20.0 | 20 | 0 | 2 | 0 |
| 2016 | PHI | 15 | **5** | 52 | 427 | 8.2 | 73T | 2 | **94** | 438 | 4.7 | 25T | 2 | 17 | 224 | **13.2** | 66 | 0 | 1 | 19 | 19.0 | 19 | 0 | 1 | 0 |
| 2017 | PHI | 3 | 0 | 7 | 73 | 10.3 | 16 | 0 | 15 | 61 | 4.1 | 12 | 0 | 1 | 10 | 10.0 | 10 | 0 | 0 | 0 | 0.0 | 0 | 0 | 1 | 1 |
| 2018 | PHI | 6 | 2 | 15 | 160 | 10.7 | 37 | 2 | 29 | 120 | 4.1 | 17 | 1 | 10 | 83 | 8.3 | 14 | 0 | 1 | 2 | 2.0 | 2 | 0 | 0 | 0 |
| 2019 | PHI | 6 | 1 | 6 | 24 | 4.0 | 7 | 0 | 17 | 66 | 3.9 | 17 | 0 | 11 | 86 | 7.8 | 17 | 0 | 0 | 0 | 0.0 | 0 | 0 | 1 | 0 |
| Career | | 183 | 31 | 553 | 4,840 | 8.8 | 81T | 32 | 732 | 3,552 | 4.9 | 49T | 23 | 311 | 2,961 | 9.5 | 89T | 7 | 332 | 8,352 | 25.2 | 103T | 2 | 23 | 11 |

=== College ===
Legend
| | Led the NCAA |
| **Bold** | Career high |

| Season | Team | GP | Rushing | | | | |
| Season | Team | GP | Att | Yds | Avg | Lng | TD |
|---|---|---|---|---|---|---|---|
| 2001 | Kansas State | 6 | 28 | 210 | 7.5 | 38 | 1 |
| 2002 | Kansas State | 13 | 237 | 1,465 | 6.2 | **80** | **17** |
| 2003 | Kansas State | 15 | **306** | **1,986** | **6.5** | 73 | 16 |
| 2004 | Kansas State | 11 | 244 | 1,318 | 5.4 | 74 | 11 |
| Career | | 45 | 815 | 4,979 | 6.1 | 80 | 45 |

== Career highlights ==
=== Awards and honors ===
As a player:

- Super Bowl champion (LII)
- Second-team All-Pro (2014) (Note: Selected as a Return Specialist)
- 3× Pro Bowl (2014–2016)
- 2× NFL 2010s All-Decade Team (Note: Selected as flex and punt returner)
- 2× NFL Top 100 — 86th (2012), 81st (2015)
- San Diego Chargers 50th Anniversary Team
- First-team All-American (2003)
- NCAA rushing yards leader (2003)
- 2× First-team All-Big 12 (2003, 2004)
- Second-team All-Big 12 (2002)

As a staff member / executive:

- Super Bowl champion (LIX)

=== Records ===
==== NFL records ====
- Most combined all-purpose yards in a two-game playoff span (2008): 602
- Most All-purpose yards in a single season (2011): 2,696
- Most receiving touchdowns by a person shorter than 5 feet 7 inches (1.70 m): 32

==== Chargers franchise records ====
- Most career kickoff return yards: 6,469

==== Eagles franchise records ====
- Most career punt return touchdowns: 4 (Tied with DeSean Jackson)

== Coaching career ==
On August 5, 2025, Denver Broncos head coach Sean Payton, Sproles' former coach from his time with the Saints, announced in an interview with Dianna Russini and Chase Daniel that Sproles would undertake a coaching internship with the Broncos during the 2026 NFL season.

=== Houston Texans ===
Sproles later announced in May 2026 that he would instead be joining the Houston Texans coaching staff as an intern.

== Executive career ==
On February 7, 2020, Sproles was hired as a personnel consultant in the Eagles' football operations department, alongside former teammate Brent Celek.

== Personal life ==
Sproles's father, Larry, played running back at MidAmerica Nazarene University. Larry was 5 ft 5 in (1.65 m) tall. His mother Annette died of cancer in April 2004.

Sproles maintains his off-season home near San Diego in Poway, California.

Sproles is married to Michel Sproles.

== See also ==
- List of college football yearly rushing leaders
- List of National Football League annual punt return yards leaders
- List of National Football League career all-purpose yards leaders
