= Lance Moore =

American football player (born 1983)

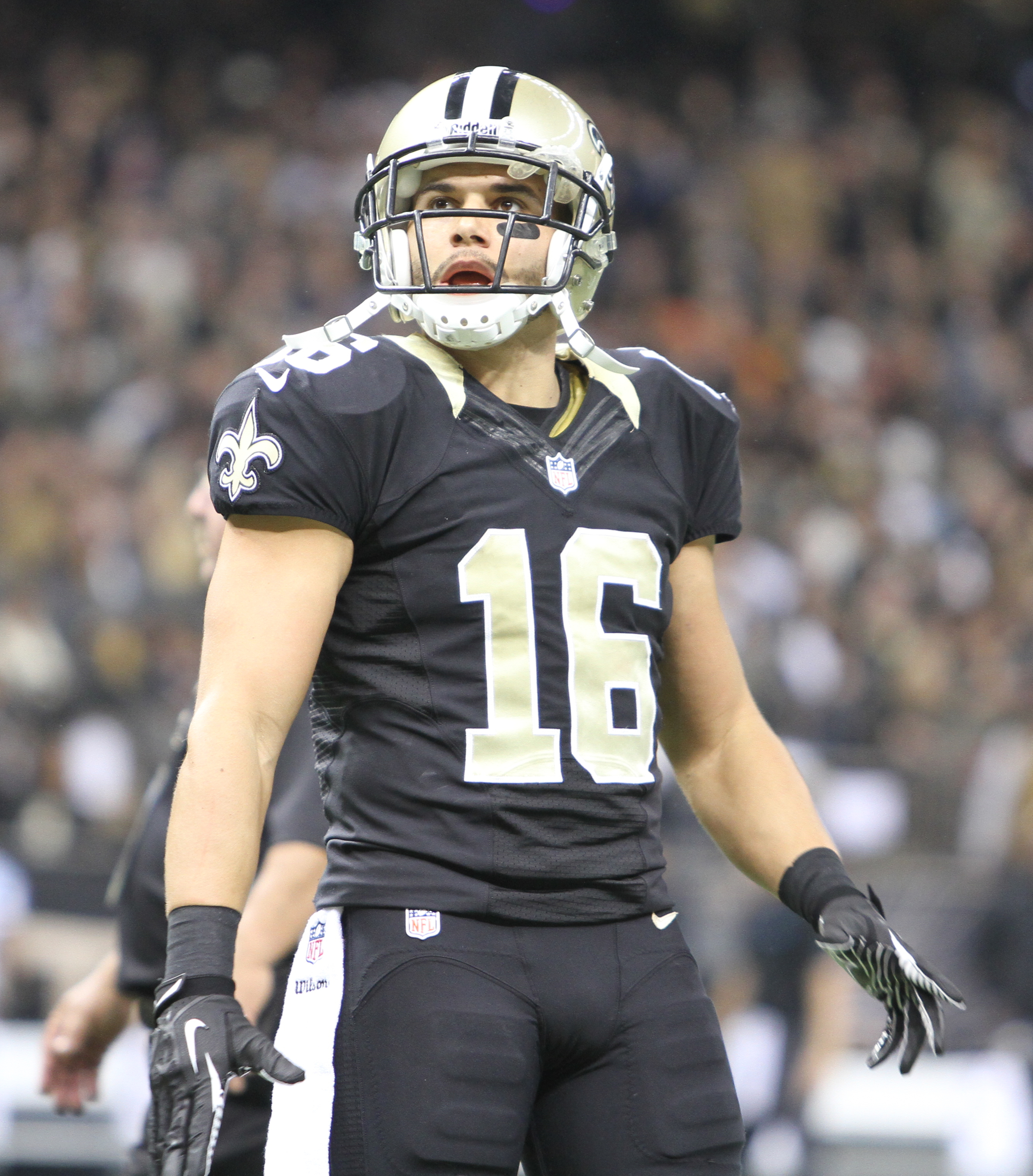
- Moore with the New Orleans Saints in 2013.

No. 16
- Position: Wide receiver

Personal information
- Born: August 31, 1983 (age 43); Westerville, Ohio, U.S.
- Listed height: 5 ft 9 in (1.75 m)
- Listed weight: 187 lb (85 kg)

Career information
- High school: Westerville South
- College: Toledo (2001–2004)
- NFL draft: 2005: undrafted

Career history
- Cleveland Browns (2005)*; New Orleans Saints (2005–2013); → Berlin Thunder (2006); Pittsburgh Steelers (2014); Detroit Lions (2015); Atlanta Falcons (2016)*
- * Offseason or practice squad member only

Awards and highlights
- Super Bowl champion (XLIV); New Orleans Saints Hall of Fame

Career NFL statistics
- Receptions: 389
- Receiving yards: 4,816
- Receiving touchdowns: 44
- Stats at Pro Football Reference

Lance Andrew Moore (born August 31, 1983) is an American former professional football player who was a wide receiver for 10 seasons in the National Football League (NFL). He played college football for the Toledo Rockets. He was signed by the Cleveland Browns as an undrafted free agent in 2005. Moore joined the New Orleans Saints in 2006 and played with them for eight seasons, and was a member of the 2009 Super Bowl championship team that beat the Indianapolis Colts. He also played for the Pittsburgh Steelers and Detroit Lions.

== Early life ==
Moore attended Westerville South High School and set state high school records for receptions (103) and touchdown catches (24) during his senior year.

== College career ==
As a receiver for the University of Toledo, Moore compiled 2,776 yards and 25 touchdowns on 222 receptions in 50 career games from 2001 to 2004. He also had 902 kick return yards and 399 punt return yards with two punt returns for touchdown.

In the 2004 Mid-American Conference championship, he caught three of Bruce Gradkowski's four touchdown throws in a victory against Miami University.

Moore was also the only person in Toledo school history to gain over 1,000 yards twice and set a school single season mark with 14 touchdown receptions as a senior. Moore was twice elected as a first-team All-Mid American Conference player.

Moore majored in business at Toledo.

== Professional career ==
Pre-draft measurables
Height	Weight	40-yard dash	20-yard shuttle	Three-cone drill	Vertical jump	Broad jump
5 ft 9 1/4 in (1.76 m)	177 lb (80 kg)	4.52 s	4.32 s	7.12 s	40 in (1.02 m)	9 ft 9 in (2.97 m)
All values from NFL Combine/Pro Day

=== New Orleans Saints ===
Moore was signed as an undrafted free agent by the Cleveland Browns on April 29, 2005. He was later released and then signed to the New Orleans Saints' practice squad.

In 2006, Moore was allocated by the Saints to NFL Europe, where he played for the Berlin Thunder. He was later on the Saints active roster for six games during the 2006 NFL season and saw action in four of those games with roles as a returner and wide receiver. He was waived by the team on October 29, 2006, and then re-signed to the practice squad the following day.

On October 14, 2007, he got the first opportunity of his professional career to start. He started alongside wide receiver Marques Colston and scored the first touchdown of his career on a 7-yard end around against the Seattle Seahawks with 05:18 remaining in the second quarter.

Moore started the 2008 season as the Saints number three wide receiver. When number one wide receiver Marques Colston was sidelined with a broken finger, Moore was given more playing opportunity and made his way up to the number two position. The 2008 season proved to be the best yet for Lance Moore as he made the most of his playing time by starting for an injured Marques Colston and ended the season with 79 receptions, for 928 yards and adding 10 touchdowns.

Due to an ankle and hamstring injuries, Moore's numbers throughout most of the 2009 season had been down from his 2008 breakout season. However, when healthy, he was able to achieve a 6 catch, 78 yard performance in the postseason. Against the Colts in Super Bowl XLIV, he had two receptions for 21 yards in the first half, and a 4th quarter acrobatic catch for a two-point conversion.

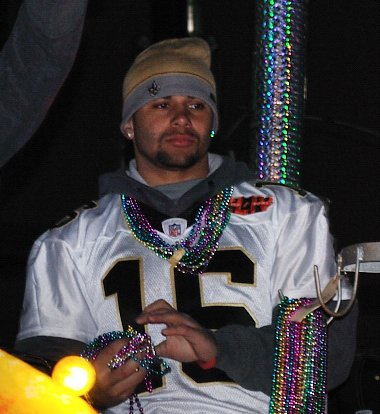
Moore at the Saints' Super Bowl victory parade in 2010.

Due to Reggie Bush being sidelined with an injury, Moore had a breakout performance against the Atlanta Falcons in 2010. Moore ended the season with 66 catches for 763 yards and eight touchdowns. In 2011, Moore recorded 627 yards and eight touchdowns. In 2012, Moore had the best season of his career with 1,041 yards (a career-high) and six touchdowns. He finished second on the team in receiving yards.

Moore's role diminished in 2013 as he struggled with injuries, missing three games and recording only 457 yards and two touchdowns. He became the team's fourth receiving option on the depth chart behind emerging rookie Kenny Stills. On March 7, 2014, Moore was released by the Saints.

=== Pittsburgh Steelers ===
On March 21, 2014, Moore signed a two-year deal with the Pittsburgh Steelers. He was released on March 2, 2015.

=== Detroit Lions ===
On May 12, 2015, Moore signed a one-year contract with the Detroit Lions. On November 26, during a game against the Philadelphia Eagles, Moore left with an ankle injury. Moore was later ruled out for Thursday's Week 13 game. Moore finished the season with 29 catches for 337 yards and four touchdowns.

=== Atlanta Falcons and retirement ===
On August 5, 2016, Moore signed with the Atlanta Falcons. Three days later, the team announced that Moore had decided to retire from the NFL.

On May 30, 2017, Moore signed a one-day contract to retire as a New Orleans Saint.

== NFL career statistics ==
Legend
	Won the Super Bowl
**Bold**	Career high

Year	Team	Games		Receiving					Rushing				
Year	Team	GP	GS	Rec	Yds	Avg	Lng	TD	Att	Yds	Avg	Lng	TD
2005	NO	0	0	—	—	—	—	—	—	—	—	—	—
2006	NO	4	0	1	10	10.0	10	0	—	—	—	—	—
2007	NO	**16**	4	32	302	9.4	22	2	**2**	**7**	**3.5**	**7**	**1**
2008	NO	**16**	6	**79**	928	11.7	70	**10**	—	—	—	—	—
2009	NO	7	0	14	153	10.9	22	2	—	—	—	—	—
2010	NO	**16**	1	66	763	11.6	**80**	8	—	—	—	—	—
2011	NO	14	7	52	627	12.1	47	8	—	—	—	—	—
2012	NO	15	7	65	**1,041**	**16.0**	51	6	—	—	—	—	—
2013	NO	13	5	37	457	12.4	44	2	—	—	—	—	—
2014	PIT	14	2	14	198	14.1	29	2	—	—	—	—	—
2015	DET	14	**8**	29	337	11.6	42	4	—	—	—	—	—
Career		115	32	360	4,479	12.4	80	44	2	7	3.5	7	1

== Personal life ==
On March 25, 2017, Moore married girlfriend and model Kasey Trione. They share two daughters and a son: Graylee Mae (born August 2015), Nola Rae (born October 2017), and Marino Joe (born August 2019).

== See also ==
- List of NCAA major college football yearly receiving leaders
