= Aaron Kromer =

American football coach (born 1967)

Personal information
- Born: April 30, 1967 (age 59); Sandusky, Ohio, U.S.

Career information
- Position: Offensive tackle
- High school: Castalia (OH) Margaretta
- College: Miami (OH)

Career history
- Miami (Ohio) (1990–1991) Graduate assistant; Miami (Ohio) (1992–1997) Tight ends coach/H-backs coach; Miami (Ohio) (1998) Offensive line; Northwestern (1999–2000) Offensive line coach; Oakland Raiders (2001) Assistant offensive line coach; Oakland Raiders (2002–2004) Offensive line; Tampa Bay Buccaneers (2005) Senior assistant; Tampa Bay Buccaneers (2006–2007) Senior assistant/offensive line; New Orleans Saints (2008) Running backs coach; New Orleans Saints (2009–2012) Offensive line coach; New Orleans Saints (2012) Interim head coach; Chicago Bears (2013–2014) Offensive coordinator; Buffalo Bills (2015–2016) Offensive line coach; Los Angeles Rams (2017) Offensive line coach; Los Angeles Rams (2018–2020) Run game coordinator & offensive line coach; Buffalo Bills (2022–2025) Offensive line coach

Awards and highlights
- Super Bowl champion (XLIV)

Head coaching record
- Regular season: 2–4 (.333)
- Coaching profile at Pro Football Reference

Aaron Kromer (born April 30, 1967) is an American retired football coach. Kromer served as the interim head coach of the New Orleans Saints for the first six games of the 2012 season.

== Playing career ==
Kromer is a 1985 graduate of Margaretta High School in Castalia, Ohio, where he played football and basketball. He played offensive tackle for three seasons at Miami University from 1987 to 1989.

== Coaching career ==
Kromer began his NFL coaching career in 2001 with the Oakland Raiders. In 2003, he helped lead the Raiders to an AFC championship and to Super Bowl XXXVII. Kromer was hired by the New Orleans Saints in 2008 as the running backs coach, before becoming the offensive line coach the following season. Under his tenure as OL coach, the Saints sent five players to a combined nine Pro Bowls, and tied for the fewest sacks in the league with 96. Under Kromer, the Saints line twice won the Madden Most Valuable Protectors Award as the best offensive line in the league (in 2009 and 2011). The Saints won Super Bowl XLIV with Kromer. He filled in as the Saints' interim head coach for the first six games of the 2012 NFL season as Joe Vitt and Sean Payton served their suspensions for "BountyGate". The Saints went 2-4 during that season-opening stretch, losing each of their first four games by eight points or less.

On January 16, 2013, Kromer was announced as the new offensive coordinator and offensive line coach for the Chicago Bears. He joined Marc Trestman's initial coaching staff, after working with Trestman in Oakland. In his first year, the Bears offense had the second-best scoring offense in the league with 445 points, behind the Denver Broncos, while finishing fifth with 4281 passing yards. The offense also broke team records in total yards (6,109), passing yards (4,450), passing touchdowns (32) and first downs (344). On February 12, 2014, offensive line assistant Pat Meyer was named offensive line coach while Kromer, who served as offensive coordinator and line coach in 2013, remained the offensive coordinator and continued to be involved in all aspects of the offense, including the line with an increased role with the passing game.

On January 17, 2015, the Buffalo Bills reached a two-year deal with Kromer to be the team's new offensive line coach. He was later suspended for 6 games by the Buffalo Bills from an incident in which he and his son were accused of striking a group of minors; Kromer himself allegedly punched a boy in the face and threatened to kill his family in an argument over beach chairs. Two weeks later all charges were dropped against Kromer, at the request of the victims and as a part of a civil settlement.

On January 30, 2018, Los Angeles Rams head coach Sean McVay promoted him to run game coordinator, after Matt LaFleur left to become the offensive coordinator of the Tennessee Titans. In order to help fill the void, McVay also named tight ends coach Shane Waldron the pass game coordinator. In 2019 Kromer helped coach the Rams to an NFC Championship and to Super Bowl LIII. Kromer was not retained by the Rams as a coach in February 2021.

On February 7, 2022, the Buffalo Bills signed Kromer as their new offensive line coach. On January 18, 2026, Kromer retired from coaching.

=== Head coaching record ===
| Team | Year | Regular season | | | | | Postseason | | | |
| Team | Year | Won | Lost | Ties | Win % | Finish | Won | Lost | Win % | Result |
|---|---|---|---|---|---|---|---|---|---|---|
| NO* | 2012 | 2 | 4 | 0 | .333 | - | - | - | - | - |
| Total | | 2 | 4 | 0 | .333 | | - | - | - | - |

* – Interim head coach
