= Andy Tanner =

American football player (born 1988)

No. 14
- Position: Wide receiver

Personal information
- Born: May 16, 1988 (age 38); Rockwall, Texas, U.S.
- Listed height: 6 ft 0 in (1.83 m)
- Listed weight: 183 lb (83 kg)

Career information
- College: Midwestern State
- NFL draft: 2010: undrafted

Career history
- New Orleans Saints (2010–2014); Dallas Vigilantes (2011)*
- * Offseason or practice squad member only
- Stats at Pro Football Reference

Andy Tanner (born May 16, 1988) is an American former football wide receiver. He was originally signed by the Saints as an undrafted free agent in 2010. He played college football at Midwestern State.

== Professional career ==
=== New Orleans Saints ===
Over three years from 2010 to 2013, Tanner was repeatedly signed to the practice squad, released, waived, or signed to a reserve/future contract, for a total of 33 roster transactions before he finally made the Saints' opening day roster for the 2013 season. However, after the Saints sustained several defensive injuries in their first regular season game, the Saints again cut Tanner from the roster in favor of linebacker Jay Richardson on September 12, 2013. The Saints then brought Tanner back to the practice squad on September 17. The Saints released Tanner on August 25, 2014, then placed him on injured reserve on August 26 after he went unclaimed. The Saints released him on August 21, 2015.
