= Joe Morgan (American football) =

American gridiron football player (born 1988)

Joseph Morgan
No. 84
- Position: Wide receiver

Personal information
- Born: March 23, 1988 (age 38); Canton, Ohio, U.S.
- Listed height: 6 ft 1 in (1.85 m)
- Listed weight: 184 lb (83 kg)

Career information
- High school: Canton McKinley
- College: Walsh
- NFL draft: 2011: undrafted

Career history
- New Orleans Saints (2011–2015); Baltimore Ravens (2015); Toronto Argonauts (2016–2017)*; Saskatchewan Roughriders (2017)*
- * Offseason or practice squad member only

Career NFL statistics
- Receptions: 14
- Receiving yards: 471
- Receiving touchdowns: 3
- Stats at Pro Football Reference

Joseph Morgan (born March 23, 1988) is an American former professional football player who was a wide receiver in the National Football League (NFL). He played college football for the Illinois Fighting Illini and Walsh Cavaliers and was signed by the Saints as an undrafted free agent in 2011.

== Professional career ==
Pre-draft measurables
| Height | Weight | 40-yard dash | 10-yard split | 20-yard split | 20-yard shuttle | Three-cone drill | Vertical jump | Broad jump | Bench press |
|---|---|---|---|---|---|---|---|---|---|
| 6 ft 1 in (1.85 m) | 189 lb (86 kg) | 4.40 s | 1.56 s | 2.55 s | 4.25 s | 6.91 s | 36.5 in (0.93 m) | 10 ft 4 in (3.15 m) | 10 reps |
All values from NFL Combine

=== New Orleans Saints ===
Morgan was signed as an undrafted free agent by the New Orleans Saints on July 27, 2011. Little known at the beginning of training camp, he became a focus of attention after he scored touchdowns in consecutive preseason games, and was considered a strong candidate to make the regular season roster until he suffered a knee injury. He was placed on injured reserve on September 3, 2011.

In 2012 Morgan made the roster as a backup receiver. During the first three games of the season, he had only one catch and little impact, but in the Saints' fourth game, at Green Bay, he caught an 80-yard touchdown pass from Drew Brees for his first NFL touchdown and the team's longest play of the season so far. In the Saints' sixth game at Tampa Bay, he made another spectacular scoring play: after catching a long pass from Brees inside the 10 yard line, he evaded Mark Barron's tackle and managed to stay off the ground, regained his balance and flipped Eric Wright over his head as he stood up, and finally dashed into the end zone before taking a hard hit from Cody Grimm to score what a USA Today writer called "one of the great scoring efforts of the season".

On August 7, 2013, the Saints announced that Morgan suffered a torn meniscus and a partially torn ACL during training camp practice and will miss the entire 2013 season. On August 27, 2013, the Saints placed Morgan on injured reserve. On October 26, 2014, head coach Sean Payton announced that Morgan was suspended, for reasons which were not given by him. On December 9, 2014, Joe Morgan was waived by the Saints.

Morgan rejoined the Saints on April 2, 2015. He was released on September 5 for final roster cuts before the start of the season. On September 16, he re-signed with the team. On October 24, 2015, he was released by the Saints.

=== Baltimore Ravens ===
Morgan signed with the Baltimore Ravens on November 4 after placing wide receiver Steve Smith, Sr. on season ending injured reserve. He was subsequently waived on November 23 without having appeared in a game for the Ravens.

=== Toronto Argonauts ===
On October 5, 2016, Morgan signed a practice roster agreement with the Toronto Argonauts of the Canadian Football League. After spending a month on the Argonauts' practice roster until the end of the season, Morgan re-signed with the Argonauts on December 15, 2016. After playing in the preseason games Joseph was released before week 1 of the 2017 season.

Saskatchewan Roughriders

On July 3, 2017, Morgan signed a practice roster agreement with Saskatchewan Roughriders of the Canadian Football League.
