= Joe Vitt =

American football coach (born 1954)

Denver Broncos
- Title: Senior defensive assistant

Personal information
- Born: August 23, 1954 (age 72); Syracuse, New York, U.S.

Career information
- Position: Linebacker
- High school: Highland Regional (Blackwood, New Jersey)
- College: Towson State

Career history

Coaching
- Baltimore Colts (1979–1981) Quality control coach; Seattle Seahawks (1982–1991); Quality control coach (1982); Assistant linebackers coach (1983–1987); Safeties coach (1988–1991); Los Angeles Rams (1992–1994) Defensive backs coach; Philadelphia Eagles (1995–1998) Linebackers coach; Green Bay Packers (1999) Defensive backs coach; Kansas City Chiefs (2000–2003) Linebackers coach; St. Louis Rams (2004–2005) Assistant head coach & linebackers coach; New Orleans Saints (2006–2016); Assistant head coach & linebackers coach (2006–2016); Interim head coach (2012); Miami Dolphins (2017) Consultant; New York Jets (2019–2020) Outside linebackers coach; Denver Broncos (2023–present) Senior defensive assistant

Operations
- Miami Dolphins (2018) Senior director, football and player development

Awards and highlights
- Super Bowl champion (XLIV)

Head coaching record
- Regular season: 9–12 (.429)
- Career: 9–12 (.429)
- Coaching profile at Pro Football Reference

Joe Vitt (born August 23, 1954) is an American professional football coach who is the senior defensive assistant for the Denver Broncos of the National Football League (NFL). He was previously the assistant head coach and linebackers coach of the New Orleans Saints of the NFL. He was the interim head coach for the Saints during the 2012 season and the St. Louis Rams for their last eleven games in 2005.

== Early life ==
Vitt was raised in Blackwood, New Jersey where he graduated from Highland Regional High School in 1973 before spending a year at Staunton Military Academy in Virginia. He was a three-year letterman (1974–75, 1977) as a linebacker at Towson State University despite being an undersized 5'10" and smallish 190 pounds.

== NFL coaching career ==
He entered the National Football League (NFL) as the strength/quality control coach for the Baltimore Colts from 1979 through 1981.

Vitt was the Seattle Seahawks' strength coach when Chuck Knox came to be head coach in 1983. He quickly promoted Vitt to defensive backs coach. Vitt moved with Knox to the Los Angeles Rams, where he worked, along with Mike Martz, on his staff from 1992 to 1994.

Vitt has also been an assistant for the Philadelphia Eagles and Green Bay Packers. He served under former St. Louis Rams coach Dick Vermeil for the Kansas City Chiefs for three years until Martz brought him to St. Louis as the assistant head coach and linebackers coach. It marked Vitt's eighth time in the NFL, and the second with the franchise. During the 2005 NFL season, Vitt served as the interim Head Coach of the Rams while Martz was out due to a bacterial heart infection. He coached the team from Week 5 until the end of the regular season; soon afterward, Martz was fired. Vitt had a record of 4–7, and was replaced by Scott Linehan in the off-season.

=== New Orleans Saints ===
The New York Jets reportedly had interest in bringing in Vitt as their head coach after Herman Edwards signed with the Kansas City Chiefs before hiring Eric Mangini. Instead, Vitt was hired by the New Orleans Saints on January 27, 2006, to serve as their assistant head coach/linebackers coach. The Saints' new head coach, Sean Payton, who had never been a head coach before, chose Vitt to provide a degree of experience that Payton lacked: Vitt's role has been half-seriously compared to that of a consigliere in a Mafia crime family. In that position, Vitt earned a Super Bowl ring as part of the 2009 Saints team that won Super Bowl XLIV.

As assistant head coach, Vitt spent a portion of 2011 serving in the head coaching capacity as Sean Payton recovered from a broken leg.

In March 2012, the NFL suspended Vitt for the first six games of the 2012 season after it found he had been complicit in the New Orleans Saints bounty scandal. According to a league statement, Vitt had been assigned to monitor Williams, but failed to tell anyone about the slush fund Williams implemented to pay defensive players for deliberately trying to knock opponents out of games. The league also found that he had helped to cover up the scheme during both of its inquiries into the matter. In December 2012 the Associated Press reported that, according to transcripts of the players' appeal hearing, former Saints defensive coordinator Gregg Williams, who was under investigation for starting the bounty program, testified that he wanted to end the program after the NFL began investigating, but Vitt overruled him. However, Vitt denied the claims, and offered to take a polygraph test. Vitt also stated that witnesses of the program had lied in the investigation.

The year after his suspension, Vitt and the Saints ended their season with an 11–5 record. From there, the Saints saw three straight years of 7–9 records. After the 2016 season, Vitt along with other assistants were fired from the coaching staff on January 5, 2017.

==== Saints interim head coach ====
Despite the suspension, on April 12, Vitt was named as interim coach of the Saints for the 2012 season while Payton sat out a year-long suspension. Offensive line coach Aaron Kromer ran the team while Vitt sat out the first six games of the regular season. Saints quarterback Drew Brees called Vitt the obvious choice to replace Sean Payton.

=== Miami Dolphins and New York Jets ===
After being fired by the Saints, son-in-law and Miami Dolphins head coach Adam Gase hired him as a consultant for the 2017 season.

In February 2019, Vitt joined the New York Jets, where Gase had become the head coach.

=== Denver Broncos ===
On March 25, 2023, the Denver Broncos hired Vitt as a senior defensive assistant.

== Personal life ==
Vitt and his wife, Linda, have two children. His son, Joe Vitt Jr., is a scout for the Saints. His daughter, Jennifer, is married to Adam Gase, the former head coach of the New York Jets and Vitt's former boss.

Vitt was nominated for the NFL's Salute to Service award in 2012 and 2013 for his volunteer work with wounded combat veterans.

== Head coaching record ==
Team	Year	Regular season					Postseason			
Team	Year	Won	Lost	Ties	Win %	Finish	Won	Lost	Win %	Result
STL	2005	4	7	0	.364	2nd in NFC West	–	–	–	–
STL Total		4	7	0	.364		-	-	-	-
NO	2012	5	5	0	.500	3rd in NFC South	–	–	–	–
NO Total		5	5	0	.500		-	-	-	-
Total		9	12	0	.429		-	-	-	-
