= Junior Galette =

American football player (born 1988)

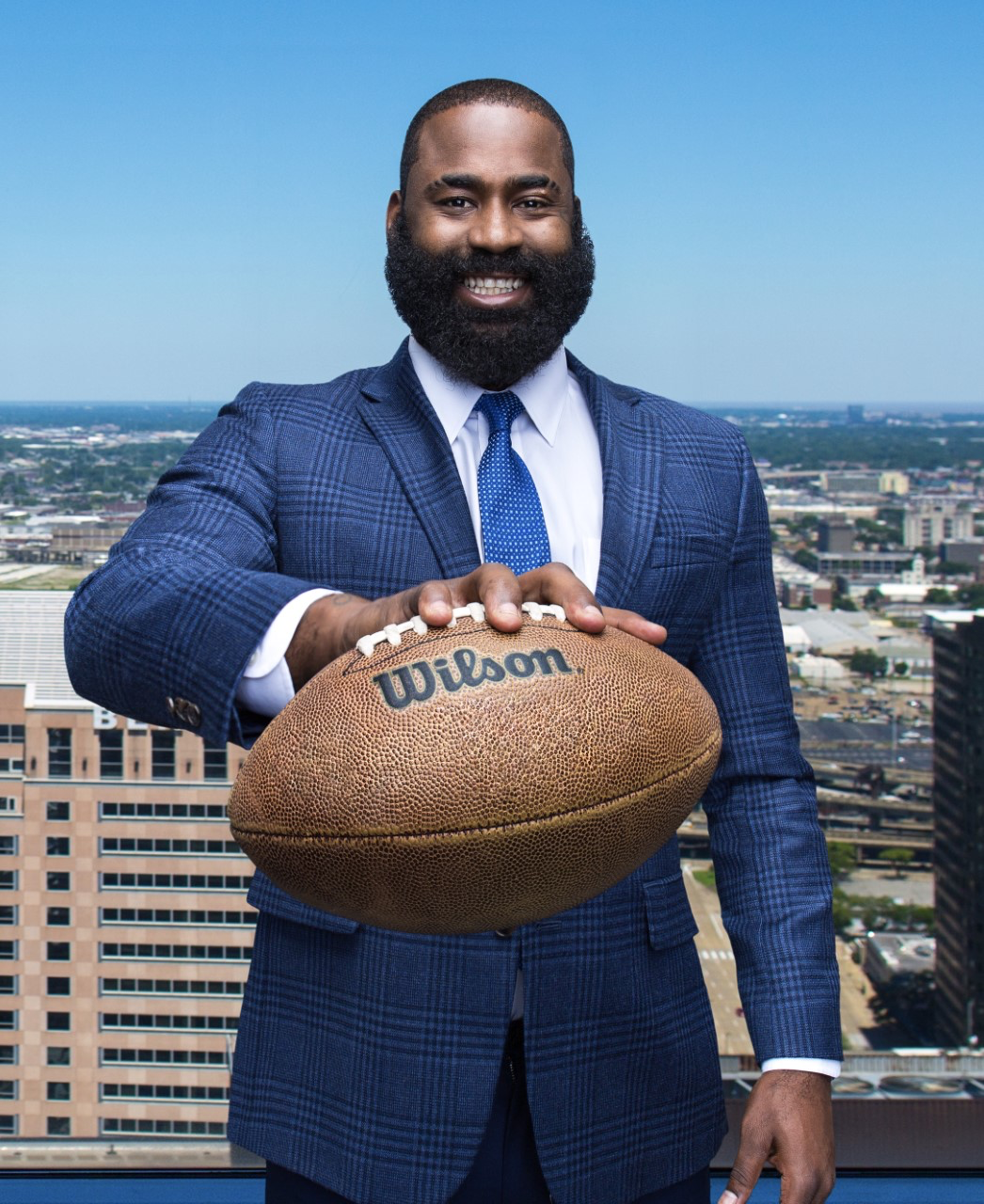

No. 93, 58
- Position: Linebacker

Personal information
- Born: March 27, 1988 (age 38); Port-au-Prince, Haiti
- Listed height: 6 ft 2 in (1.88 m)
- Listed weight: 254 lb (115 kg)

Career information
- High school: Saint Joseph Regional (Montvale, New Jersey, U.S.)
- College: Temple (2006–2008); Stillman (2009)
- NFL draft: 2010: undrafted

Career history
- New Orleans Saints (2010–2014); Washington Redskins (2015–2017)

Career NFL statistics
- Total tackles: 144
- Sacks: 34.5
- Forced fumbles: 6
- Fumble recoveries: 2
- Stats at Pro Football Reference

Junior Jovais Galette (born March 27, 1988) is a Haitian-born former professional American football linebacker. He played college football at Temple and Stillman. Galette was signed as an undrafted free agent with the New Orleans Saints. He went on to finish his career with the Washington Redskins.

== Early life ==
Junior Galette was born in Port-au-Prince, Haiti. After moving to the US, Galette started as linebacker for Ramapo High School in Spring Valley, New York. Following his sophomore season, Galette transferred as a scholarship athlete to Saint Joseph Regional High School in Montvale, New Jersey in 2006, an all-boys school. Galette played for the football and basketball teams as a junior and senior.

During his first year at St. Joseph's as a junior, he reunited with St. Joseph seniors Devin and Jason McCourty. Galette helped the football team to victory in its state Non-Public Group III title game, adding to the school's then-streak of six straight championship titles under head coach Tony Karcich. Galette continued to be a key player for the St. Joseph football team in his senior season when he had 70 tackles and 12 sacks at linebacker, and 10 touchdowns and 41 catches for 492 yards at wide receiver, capping the season with St. Joseph's seventh straight state Non-Public Group III championship title under head coach Tony Karcich.

On February 1, 2006, Galette committed to play football for Temple University in Philadelphia, receiving a full scholarship.

== College career ==
=== Freshman year ===
Galette played in 11 games with nine starts as a true freshman at Temple, earning Freshman All-American recognition. During that freshman season, Galette made 52 tackles (32 solo), 5.5 tackles for loss, 1 sack, 1 pass breakup, and 1 block. In his college debut as a true freshman, Galette earned Defensive Player of the Game honors for his 9 tackles (5 solo) and 2.5 tackles for loss. Galette was ranked No. 2 on ESPN's college football plays of the week for his acrobatic punt block that led to a touchdown against BGSU. Galette lettered his freshman year at Temple.

=== Sophomore year ===
In his sophomore year at Temple, Galette played in all 12 games with 4 starts at defensive end. Galette finished his sophomore season with 41 tackles, 11.5 tackles for loss, 7.5 sacks, 2 forced fumbles, and 1 pass breakup, leading the Temple Owls in tackles for loss and sacks. His 7.5 sacks ranked 4th among all Mid-Atlantic Conference players. Galette was named Defensive Player of the Game for Temple's win over Miami, in which he led the defense with 6 tackles, 3 sacks, and a forced fumble. Galette was named Mid-Atlantic Conference Defensive Player of the Week (October 22, 2007). Galette lettered his sophomore year at Temple.

=== Junior year ===
Galette continued to lead Temple's defense in his junior year, starting at defensive end. Galette finished his junior season with 46 tackles, a team-best 10 tackles for loss, a team-best 7.5 sacks, three break-ups, a hurry, and a forced fumble. In Temple's win over Navy on November 1, 2008, Galette led the Owls with a career-high 11 tackles, including 6 solo takedowns and a break-up, holding Navy to its lowest point total in 4 years. Galette was named Defensive Player of the Game against Navy and Central Michigan. Galette earned Temple Athlete of the Week honors for his performance against Ohio. Galette was honored with Second-team All-Mid-Atlantic Conference in 2008. Galette lettered his junior year at Temple.

Following his junior year, Galette was dismissed from the team for making "boneheaded mistakes" and for hosting a cousin who was arrested for stealing a laptop computer.

=== Senior year ===
Galette transferred to Stillman College in Tuscaloosa, Alabama for his senior year. Galette was honored as a First-team All-American for his senior year performance at Stillman and was invited to participate in the NFL's rookie combine.

== Professional career ==
Pre-draft measurables
Height	Weight	Arm length	Hand span	40-yard dash	10-yard split	20-yard split	20-yard shuttle	Three-cone drill	Vertical jump	Broad jump	Bench press
6 ft 1 3/4 in (1.87 m)	257 lb (117 kg)	33 in (0.84 m)	9 in (0.23 m)	4.77 s	1.68 s	2.77 s	4.16 s	7.04 s	33.5 in (0.85 m)	9 ft 5 in (2.87 m)	25 reps
All values from NFL Combine/Pro Day

=== New Orleans Saints ===
Galette was not drafted in the 2010 draft and signed with the Saints as a free agent. After he blocked a punt and registered two sacks in the Saints' final preseason game, Galette was selected for the Saints' 53-man regular season roster in 2010.

During the 2013 season, Galette signed a 3-year contract extension worth up to $9 million. Galette became the team's regular starter at outside linebacker under new defensive coordinator Rob Ryan and posted a team-high 12 sacks.

On September 3, 2014, Galette signed a four-year contract extension worth $41.5 million. He was selected as one of the defensive team captains for the 2014 season and played in all 16 of the Saints' games that season, ending the year with 45 total tackles, 10 sacks, and 3 forced fumbles. On July 24, 2015, Galette was officially released from the team.

=== Washington Redskins ===
On July 31, 2015, Galette signed a one-year contract with the Washington Redskins. On August 26, it was announced that Galette had torn his left Achilles tendon. He was placed on the injured reserve list on August 31 and would miss the entirety of the 2015 season. On November 16, 2015, Galette was suspended for two weeks for violating the league's personal conduct policy, stemming from a domestic violence incident in January 2015.

Galette signed a one-year extension worth up to $4 million on March 15, 2016. It was announced on July 25 that Galette had torn his right Achilles tendon and would miss the entire 2016 season.

On February 1, 2017, Galette re-signed with the Redskins on another one-year contract. Galette appeared in every game for the Redskins during the 2017 season, recording 3.0 sacks and forcing a fumble.

Following the 2017 season, Washington withdrew its offer to Galette after disagreements over salary. He would become a free agent.

== NFL career statistics ==
Year	Team	GP	Tackles				Fumbles			Interceptions					
Year	Team	GP	Cmb	Solo	Ast	Sck	FF	FR	Yds	Int	Yds	Avg	Lng	TD	PD
2010	NO	4	4	4	0	0.0	0	0	0	0	0	0.0	0	0	0
2011	NO	16	19	11	8	4.5	0	0	0	0	0	0.0	0	0	0
2012	NO	12	20	17	3	5.0	1	0	0	0	0	0.0	0	0	0
2013	NO	16	40	28	12	12.0	1	2	13	0	0	0.0	0	0	2
2014	NO	16	45	33	12	10.0	3	0	0	0	0	0.0	0	0	2
2015	WAS	0	Did not play due to injury												
2016	WAS	0	Did not play due to injury												
2017	WAS	16	20	14	6	3.0	1	0	0	0	0	0.0	0	0	2
Career		80	148	107	41	34.5	6	2	13	0	0	0.0	0	0	6

== Personal life ==
In 2022, Galette sued the NFL and Commissioner Roger Goodell, alleging racial discrimination and blacklisting after he spoke out against racism in the league. Galette claimed his contract offer from the Washington Commanders was rescinded due to his social media posts. He also argued that white player Trent Murphy received a higher contract despite similar qualifications. A federal judge dismissed the case, citing a lack of evidence for racial bias or First Amendment violations. Galette has appealed the decision.
