= Stanley Jean-Baptiste =

American gridiron football player (born 1990)

No. 33, 38
- Position: Defensive back

Personal information
- Born: April 12, 1990 (age 36); Miami, Florida, U.S.
- Listed height: 6 ft 3 in (1.91 m)
- Listed weight: 216 lb (98 kg)

Career information
- High school: Miami Central (West Little River, Florida)
- College: Nebraska
- NFL draft: 2014: 2nd round, 58th overall pick

Career history
- New Orleans Saints (2014); Detroit Lions (2015)*; Seattle Seahawks (2015–2016); Kansas City Chiefs (2017)*; Jacksonville Jaguars (2017)*; Baltimore Ravens (2017–2018); Toronto Argonauts (2020)*
- * Offseason or practice squad member only

Awards and highlights
- Second-team All-Big Ten (2013)

Career NFL statistics
- Total tackles: 1
- Stats at Pro Football Reference
- Stats at CFL.ca

Stanley Jean-Baptiste (born April 12, 1990) is an American former professional football player who was a defensive back in the National Football League (NFL). He played college football for the Nebraska Cornhuskers and was selected by the New Orleans Saints of the NFL in the second round of the 2014 NFL draft. He was also a member of the Seattle Seahawks and Baltimore Ravens.

== Early life ==
Jean-Baptiste, the son of Haitian immigrant parents, attended Westlake Preparatory School in Davie, Florida, where he played football, basketball and ran track for coach Michael Tunsil. In football, he played wide receiver. As a senior, he had 21 catches for 569 yards and seven touchdowns through the first five games of the season. Defensively, as a safety, he had six interceptions and two touchdowns. In track, he competed in sprints and jumps and recorded times of 11.4 in the 100m and 23.3 in the 200m. Following high school, Jean-Baptiste spent one year at North Carolina Tech Christian Academy, totaling 36 receptions for 580 yards in 2008.

== College career ==
Jean-Baptiste played safety and wide receiver while at Fort Scott Community College in his redshirted season. He signed with the University of Nebraska–Lincoln following the season. He finished college with a total of 74 tackles, 7 interceptions, 22 pass deflections and one sack, and was named second-team All-Big Ten Conference after recording 41 tackles, 12 pass breakups and four interceptions in his senior season.

== Professional career ==
=== Pre-draft ===
On December 30, 2013, it was reported that Jean-Baptiste had accepted his invitation to play in the 2014 Senior Bowl. On January 25, 2014, Jean-Baptiste recorded five combined tackles in the Senior Bowl playing as a part of Atlanta Falcons head coach Mike Smith's North team that loss to the South 20–10.

Pre-draft measurables
Height	Weight	Arm length	Hand span	Wingspan	40-yard dash	10-yard split	20-yard split	20-yard shuttle	Three-cone drill	Vertical jump	Broad jump	Bench press
6 ft 2 5/8 in (1.90 m)	218 lb (99 kg)	32 3/8 in (0.82 m)	8 5/8 in (0.22 m)	6 ft 6 1/8 in (1.98 m)	4.45 s	1.55 s	2.59 s	4.19 s	6.69 s	41.5 in (1.05 m)	10 ft 8 in (3.25 m)	13 reps
All values from NFL Combine/Nebraska's Pro Day

=== New Orleans Saints ===
The New Orleans Saints selected Jean-Baptiste in the second round (58th overall) of the 2014 NFL draft. He was the sixth cornerback selected in the draft. On May 18, 2014, the Saints signed Jean-Baptiste to a four-year, $3.57 million contract and a signing bonus of $970,000. He played in only four games during his rookie year with the Saints, almost entirely on special teams.

On September 3, 2015, Jean-Baptiste was constantly beaten in coverage during the Saints' 38–10 loss to the Green Bay Packers in their final preseason game. He was released by New Orleans two days later.

=== Detroit Lions ===
On September 6, 2015, Jean-Baptiste cleared waivers. Later that afternoon, he was signed to the practice squad of the Detroit Lions after refusing offers from several other teams. He was cut by the Lions on December 15.

=== Seattle Seahawks ===
On December 17, 2015, Jean-Baptiste was signed to the Seattle Seahawks' practice squad.

=== Kansas City Chiefs ===
On May 9, 2017, Jean-Baptiste was signed by the Kansas City Chiefs. He was waived by the Chiefs on June 15.

=== Jacksonville Jaguars ===
On July 25, 2017, Jean-Baptiste signed with the Jacksonville Jaguars. He was waived on September 2, and was re-signed to the team's practice squad. Jean-Baptiste was released by the Jaguars on September 12.

=== Baltimore Ravens ===
On October 3, 2017, Jean-Baptiste was signed to the Baltimore Ravens' practice squad. He was promoted to the active roster on December 5.

On August 31, 2018, Jean-Baptiste was placed on injured reserve after suffering a broken arm in the final preseason game.

On March 26, 2019, Jean-Baptiste re-signed with the Ravens. He was released by Baltimore prior to the start of the season on August 31.

=== Toronto Argonauts ===
On January 21, 2020, Jean-Baptiste signed a three-year contract with Toronto Argonauts of the Canadian Football League (CFL). After the CFL canceled the 2020 season due to the COVID-19 pandemic, Jean-Baptiste chose to opt-out of his contract with the Argonauts on September 3.

=== Statistics ===
Source: NFL.com

Year	Team	GP	GS	Tackles					Interceptions						Fumbles	
Year	Team	GP	GS	Total	Solo	Ast	Sck	SFTY	PDef	Int	Yds	Avg	Lng	TDs	FF	FR
2014	NO	4	0	0	0	0	0.0	0	0	0	0	0.0	0	0	0	0
2017	BAL	1	0	1	1	0	0.0	0	0	0	0	0.0	0	0	0	0
Total		5	0	1	1	0	0.0	0	0	0	0	0.0	0	0	0	0
