= 2013 New Orleans Saints season =

NFL team season

- Owner: Tom Benson
- General manager: Mickey Loomis
- Head coach: Sean Payton
- Offensive coordinator: Pete Carmichael Jr.
- Defensive coordinator: Rob Ryan
- Home stadium: Mercedes-Benz Superdome

Results
- Record: 11–5
- Division place: 2nd NFC South
- Playoffs: Won Wild Card Playoffs (at Eagles) 26–24; Lost Divisional Playoffs (at Seahawks) 15–23
- All-Pros: 2: TE Jimmy Graham (1st team); G Jahri Evans (2nd team)
- Pro Bowlers: 5: QB Drew Brees; TE Jimmy Graham; G Jahri Evans; G Ben Grubbs; DE Cameron Jordan

Uniform
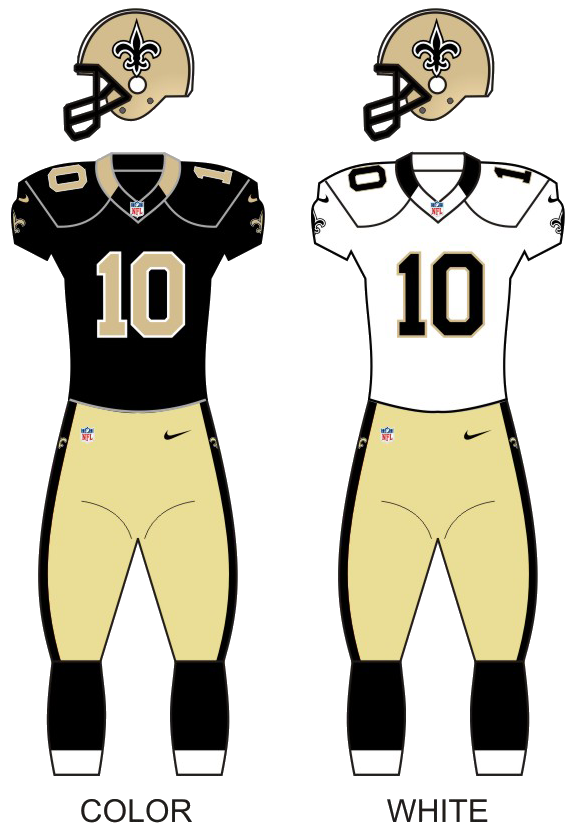

The 2013 season was the New Orleans Saints' 47th in the National Football League (NFL) and their 38th playing home games at the Mercedes-Benz Superdome. It also marked the seventh season under head coach Sean Payton, who returned to the team after serving a one-year suspension for his involvement in the team's 2012 bounty scandal.

The Saints improved their 7–9 record from last season, going 11–5 and making the playoffs as the sixth seed. They earned the franchise's first road postseason victory, with a 26–24 win over the Philadelphia Eagles in the Wild Card round, ending the drought at 0–5. However, the Saints were eliminated by the eventual Super Bowl champion Seattle Seahawks in the divisional round, by a score of 23–15.

Despite the loss to Seattle, of the Seahawks' three postseason opponents en route to their Super Bowl title, the Saints committed just one turnover against the vaunted Legion of Boom defense, compared to the San Francisco 49ers committing three in the NFC Championship Game and the Denver Broncos turning it over four times in the Super Bowl. New Orleans also gained the most amount of total yards on offense with 409, with San Francisco and Denver recording 308 and 306 yards respectively, and also the greatest number of passing yards with 301, compared to the 49ers managing 147 yards through the air and the Broncos with 279 passing yards.

The 2013 season was the second time in three years the Saints went 8–0 at home. This was the Saints last playoff appearance and winning season until 2017.

== Offseason ==
=== Signings ===
Pos.	Player	2012 Team	Contract
CB	Keenan Lewis	Pittsburgh Steelers	5 years, $25.5 million
TE	Benjamin Watson	Cleveland Browns	3 years, $4.9 million
LB	Victor Butler	Dallas Cowboys	2 years, $3 million
DE	Kenyon Coleman	Dallas Cowboys	1 year, $1 million
CB	Chris Carr	San Diego Chargers	1 year, $840,000
QB	Luke McCown	Atlanta Falcons	1 year, $840,000
OT	Jason Smith	New York Jets	1 year, $780,000
WR	Robert Meachem	San Diego Chargers	1 year, $715,000

=== Re-Signings ===
Pos.	Player	Contract
WR	Courtney Roby	1 year, $905,000
LB	Will Herring	1 year, $765,000
OLB	Ramon Humber	1 year, $740,000

=== Departures ===
Pos.	Player	2013 Team
OT	Jermon Bushrod	Chicago Bears
QB	Chase Daniel	Kansas City Chiefs
LB	Jonathan Casillas	Tampa Bay Buccaneers
S	Jim Leonhard	Buffalo Bills
CB	Elbert Mack	Houston Texans
QB	Seneca Wallace	San Francisco 49ers
WR	Steve Breaston	
LB	Scott Shanle	

== 2013 draft class ==
2013 New Orleans Saints draft
Round	Pick	Player	Position	College	Notes
1	15	Kenny Vaccaro	Safety	Texas	
3	75	Terron Armstead *	Offensive tackle	Arkansas–Pine Bluff	
3	82	John Jenkins	Defensive tackle	Georgia	
5	144	Kenny Stills	Wide receiver	Oklahoma	
6	183	Rufus Johnson	Defensive end	Tarleton State	
Made roster * Made at least one Pro Bowl during career

Notes The Saints did not have selections in the second, fourth, or seventh rounds. They forfeited their second-round selection as part of the punishment for the team's 2012 bounty scandal. They acquired the No. 82 selection in a trade that sent two fourth-round selections, Nos. 106 and 109 overall, to the Miami Dolphins. The No. 106 selection had been acquired in a trade that sent running back Chris Ivory to the New York Jets. The Saints traded their seventh-round selection to the Seattle Seahawks in exchange for linebacker Barrett Ruud.

== Staff ==
2013 New Orleans Saints staff
Front office: Owner/chairman – Tom Benson; Owner/vice chairman – Rita Benson LeBlanc; President – Dennis Lauscha; Executive vice president/general manager – Mickey Loomis; Director of football administration – Khai Harley; Director of player personnel – Ryan Pace; Director of pro scouting – Terry Fontenot; Director of college scouting – Rick Reiprish; Assistant director of college scouting – Brian Adams; Head coaches: Head coach – Sean Payton; Assistant head coach/linebackers – Joe Vitt; Offensive coaches: Offensive coordinator – Pete Carmichael, Jr.; Quarterbacks – Joe Lombardi; Running backs – Dan Roushar; Wide receivers – Henry Ellard; Tight ends – Terry Malone; Offensive line – Bret Ingalls; Offensive assistant – Carter Sheridan; Offensive assistant – Frank Smith	Defensive coaches: Defensive coordinator – Rob Ryan; Defensive line – Bill Johnson; Secondary – Wesley McGriff; Assistant secondary – Andre Curtis; Defensive assistant – Marcus Ungaro; Defensive assistant/linebackers – Brian Young; Special teams coaches: Special teams coordinator – Greg McMahon; Assistant special teams – Stan Kwan; Strength and conditioning: Head strength and conditioning – Dan Dalrymple; Assistant strength and conditioning – Charles Byrd; Weight room assistant – Robert Wenning

== Final roster ==
2013 New Orleans Saints roster
Quarterbacks (QB): 9 Drew Brees; 4 Ryan Griffin; 7 Luke McCown; Running backs (RB): 39 Travaris Cadet; 45 Jed Collins FB; 22 Mark Ingram; 29 Khiry Robinson; 43 Darren Sproles; 23 Pierre Thomas; Wide receivers (WR): 12 Marques Colston; 17 Robert Meachem; 16 Lance Moore; 84 Kenny Stills; 88 Nick Toon; Tight ends (TE): 80 Jimmy Graham; 89 Josh Hill; 82 Ben Watson	Offensive linemen (OL): 72 Terron Armstead T; 71 Charles Brown T; 60 Brian de la Puente C; 73 Jahri Evans G; 66 Ben Grubbs G; 79 Bryce Harris T; 68 Tim Lelito C/G; 64 Zach Strief T; Defensive linemen (DL): 77 Brodrick Bunkley NT; 97 Glenn Foster DE; 76 Akiem Hicks DE; 92 John Jenkins NT; 96 Tom Johnson DE; 94 Cameron Jordan DE; 75 Tyrunn Walker NT	Linebackers (LB): 55 Keyunta Dawson OLB; 93 Junior Galette OLB; 98 Parys Haralson OLB; 57 David Hawthorne ILB; 54 Will Herring OLB; 53 Ramon Humber LB; 50 Curtis Lofton ILB; 52 Kevin Reddick ILB; Defensive backs (DB): 42 Isa Abdul-Quddus FS; 25 Rafael Bush FS; 37 Eric Frampton SS; 31 Terrence Frederick CB; 41 Roman Harper SS; 27 Malcolm Jenkins FS; 28 Keenan Lewis CB; 38 Rod Sweeting CB; 30 Trevin Wade CB; 24 Corey White CB; Special teams (ST): 47 Justin Drescher LS; 3 Shayne Graham K; 6 Thomas Morstead P	Practice squad: 18 Charles Hawkins WR; 81 Michael Higgins TE; 35 Austin Johnson FB; 59 Rufus Johnson DE; 70 Marcel Jones T; 65 Senio Kelemete G; 58 Kyle Knox LB; 14 Andy Tanner WR; Reserve: 90 Victor Butler OLB (PUP); 99 Kenyon Coleman DE (IR); 20 A. J. Davis CB (IR); 11 Chris Givens WR (IR); 33 Jabari Greer CB (IR); 13 Joe Morgan WR (IR); 21 Patrick Robinson CB (IR); 91 Will Smith DE (IR); 32 Kenny Vaccaro SS (IR); 51 Jonathan Vilma ILB (IR); Rookies in italics 53 active, 10 reserve, 8 practice squad

== Preseason ==
Week	Date	Opponent	Result	Record	Venue	Recap
1	August 9	Kansas City Chiefs	W 17–13	1–0	Mercedes-Benz Superdome	Recap
2	August 16	Oakland Raiders	W 28–20	2–0	Mercedes-Benz Superdome	Recap
3	August 25	at Houston Texans	W 31–23	3–0	Reliant Stadium	Recap
4	August 29	at Miami Dolphins	L 21–24	3–1	Sun Life Stadium	Recap

== Regular season ==
=== Schedule ===
Week	Date	Opponent	Result	Record	Venue	Recap
1	September 8	**Atlanta Falcons**	**W** 23–17	1–0	Mercedes-Benz Superdome	Recap
2	September 15	at **Tampa Bay Buccaneers**	**W** 16–14	2–0	Raymond James Stadium	Recap
3	September 22	Arizona Cardinals	**W** 31–7	3–0	Mercedes-Benz Superdome	Recap
4	September 30	Miami Dolphins	**W** 38–17	4–0	Mercedes-Benz Superdome	Recap
5	October 6	at Chicago Bears	**W** 26–18	5–0	Soldier Field	Recap
6	October 13	at New England Patriots	**L** 27–30	5–1	Gillette Stadium	Recap
7	Bye					
8	October 27	Buffalo Bills	**W** 35–17	6–1	Mercedes-Benz Superdome	Recap
9	November 3	at New York Jets	**L** 20–26	6–2	MetLife Stadium	Recap
10	November 10	Dallas Cowboys	**W** 49–17	7–2	Mercedes-Benz Superdome	Recap
11	November 17	San Francisco 49ers	**W** 23–20	8–2	Mercedes-Benz Superdome	Recap
12	November 21	at **Atlanta Falcons**	**W** 17–13	9–2	Georgia Dome	Recap
13	December 2	at Seattle Seahawks	**L** 7–34	9–3	CenturyLink Field	Recap
14	December 8	**Carolina Panthers**	**W** 31–13	10–3	Mercedes-Benz Superdome	Recap
15	December 15	at St. Louis Rams	**L** 16–27	10–4	Edward Jones Dome	Recap
16	December 22	at **Carolina Panthers**	**L** 13–17	10–5	Bank of America Stadium	Recap
17	December 29	**Tampa Bay Buccaneers**	**W** 42–17	11–5	Mercedes-Benz Superdome	Recap

Note: Intra-division opponents are in bold text.

=== Game summaries ===
==== Week 1: vs. Atlanta Falcons ====
Week One: Atlanta Falcons at New Orleans Saints – Game summary

Quarter	1	2	3	4	Total
Falcons	10	0	7	0	**17**
**Saints**	0	13	7	3	**23**

at Mercedes-Benz Superdome, New Orleans, Louisiana

- Date: September 8
- Game time: 12:00 p.m. CDT
- Game weather: Played indoors (dome stadium)
- Game attendance: 72,348
- Referee: Gene Steratore
- TV announcers (Fox): Kenny Albert, Daryl Johnston and Tony Siragusa
- Recap, Game book

Game information

**First quarter**

- ATL – Tony Gonzalez 7-yard pass from Matt Ryan (Matt Bryant kick), 8:32. Falcons 7–0. **Drive: 6 plays, 82 yards, 3:06.**
- ATL – Matt Bryant 23-yard field goal, 1:28. Falcons 10–0. **Drive: 8 plays, 40 yards, 3:57.**

**Second quarter**

- NO – Garrett Hartley 48-yard field goal, 10:53. Falcons 10–3. **Drive: 12 plays, 50 yards, 5:35.**
- NO – Marques Colston 25-yard pass from Drew Brees (Garrett Hartley kick), 9:10. Tied 10–10. **Drive: 3 plays, 31 yards, 1:26.**
- NO – Garrett Hartley 31-yard field goal, 1:47. Saints 13–10. **Drive: 6 plays, 67 yards, 4:02.**

**Third quarter**

- ATL – Julio Jones 4-yard pass from Matt Ryan (Matt Bryant kick), 11:41. Falcons 17–13. **Drive: 5 plays, 59 yards, 1:58.**
- NO – Jimmy Graham 7-yard pass from Drew Brees (Garrett Hartley kick), 6:22. Saints 20–17. **Drive: 10 plays, 80 yards, 5:19.**

**Fourth quarter**

- NO – Garrett Hartley 22-yard field goal, 3:12. Saints 23–17. **Drive: 10 plays, 68 yards, 6:12.**

**Top passers**

- ATL – Matt Ryan – 25/38, 304 yards, 2 TD, INT
- NO – Drew Brees – 26/35, 357 yards, 2 TD, INT

**Top rushers**

- ATL – Steven Jackson – 11 rushes, 77 yards
- NO – Pierre Thomas – 9 rushes, 43 yards

**Top receivers**

- ATL – Harry Douglas – 4 receptions, 93 yards
- NO – Darren Sproles – 6 receptions, 88 yards

With the win against Atlanta, the Saints began their season to 1-0.

==== Week 2: at Tampa Bay Buccaneers ====
Week Two: New Orleans Saints at Tampa Bay Buccaneers – Game summary

Quarter	1	2	3	4	Total
**Saints**	10	0	3	3	**16**
Buccaneers	7	0	0	7	**14**

at Raymond James Stadium, Tampa, Florida

- Date: September 15
- Game time: 4:05 p.m. EDT/3:05 p.m. CDT
- Game weather: 93 °F (34 °C), cloudy
- Game attendance: 60,870
- Referee: Bill Leavy
- TV announcers (Fox): Kevin Burkhardt, John Lynch and Erin Andrews
- Recap, Game book

Game information

**First quarter**

- NO – Garrett Hartley 44-yard field goal, 10:30. Saints 3–0. **Drive: 11 plays, 54 yards, 4:30.**
- TB – Kevin Ogletree 5-yard pass from Josh Freeman (Rian Lindell kick), 5:15. Buccaneers 7–3. **Drive: 7 plays, 35 yards, 2:48.**
- NO – Jimmy Graham 56-yard pass from Drew Brees (Garrett Hartley kick), 2:36. Saints 10–7. **Drive: 6 plays, 80 yards, 2:39.**

**Second quarter**

- No scoring plays.

**Third quarter**

- NO – Garrett Hartley 41-yard field goal, 8:04. Saints 13–7. **Drive: 8 plays, 17 yards, 3:45.**

**Fourth quarter**

- TB – Mason Foster 85-yard interception return (Rian Lindell kick), 12:40. Buccaneers 14–13.
- NO – Garrett Hartley 27-yard field goal, 0:00. Saints 16–14. **Drive: 5 plays, 54 yards, 1:06.**

**Top passers**

- NO – Drew Brees – 26/46, 322 yards, TD, 2 INT
- TB – Josh Freeman – 9/22, 125 yards, TD, INT

**Top rushers**

- NO – Pierre Thomas – 5 rushes, 29 yards
- TB – Doug Martin – 29 rushes, 144 yards

**Top receivers**

- NO – Jimmy Graham – 10 receptions, 179 yards, TD
- TB – Vincent Jackson – 5 receptions, 77 yards

Coming off a Week 1 win against Atlanta, the Saints face the Buccaneers. The Saints narrowly won over the Buccaneers 16–14, thus improving them to 2-0.

==== Week 3: vs. Arizona Cardinals ====
Week Three: Arizona Cardinals at New Orleans Saints – Game summary

Quarter	1	2	3	4	Total
Cardinals	7	0	0	0	**7**
**Saints**	7	7	3	14	**31**

at Mercedes-Benz Superdome, New Orleans, Louisiana

- Date: September 22
- Game time: 12:00 p.m. CDT
- Game weather: Played indoors (dome stadium)
- Game attendance: 73,057
- Referee: Walt Coleman
- TV announcers (Fox): Sam Rosen, Heath Evans and Molly McGrath
- Recap, Game book

Game information

**First quarter**

- ARI – Alfonso Smith 3-yard run (Jay Feely kick), 9:13. Cardinals 7–0. **Drive: 11 plays, 80 yards, 5:47.**
- NO – Robert Meachem 27-yard pass from Drew Brees (Garrett Hartley kick), 5:28. Tied 7–7. **Drive: 8 plays, 80 yards, 3:45.**

**Second quarter**

- NO – Jimmy Graham 16-yard pass from Drew Brees (Garrett Hartley kick), 2:52. Saints 14–7. **Drive: 6 plays, 58 yards, 2:16.**

**Third quarter**

- NO – Garrett Hartley 31-yard field goal, 4:03. Saints 17–7. **Drive: 8 plays, 67 yards, 3:48.**

**Fourth quarter**

- NO – Drew Brees 7-yard run (Garrett Hartley kick), 14:42. Saints 24–7. **Drive: 7 plays, 39 yards, 2:18.**
- NO – Jimmy Graham 7-yard pass from Drew Brees (Garrett Hartley kick), 5:25. Saints 31–7. **Drive: 12 plays, 63 yards, 6:31.**

**Top passers**

- ARI – Carson Palmer – 18/35, 187 yards, 2 INT
- NO – Drew Brees – 29/46, 342 yards, 3 TD, INT

**Top rushers**

- ARI – Rashard Mendenhall – 9 rushes, 29 yards
- NO – Khiry Robinson – 4 rushes, 38 yards

**Top receivers**

- ARI – Larry Fitzgerald – 5 receptions, 64 yards
- NO – Jimmy Graham – 9 receptions, 134 yards, 2 TD

After a 2-0 start, the Saints faced the Cardinals. With a dominant 31-7 win, they improved to 3-0.

==== Week 4: vs. Miami Dolphins ====
Week Four: Miami Dolphins at New Orleans Saints – Game summary

Quarter	1	2	3	4	Total
Dolphins	3	7	0	7	**17**
**Saints**	7	14	14	3	**38**

at Mercedes-Benz Superdome, New Orleans, Louisiana

- Date: September 30
- Game time: 7:40 p.m. CDT
- Game weather: Played indoors (dome stadium)
- Game attendance: 73,118
- Referee: Bill Vinovich
- TV announcers (ESPN): Mike Tirico, Jon Gruden and Lisa Salters
- Recap, Game book

Game information

**First quarter**

- NO – Darren Sproles 5-yard run (Garrett Hartley kick), 11:52. Saints 7–0. **Drive: 6 plays, 82 yards, 3:08.**
- MIA – Caleb Sturgis 34-yard field goal, 7:16. Saints 7–3. **Drive: 9 plays, 67 yards, 4:36.**

**Second quarter**

- NO – Jimmy Graham 27-yard pass from Drew Brees (Garrett Hartley kick), 8:01. Saints 14–3. **Drive: 7 plays, 62 yards, 3:47.**
- MIA – Lamar Miller 5-yard run (Caleb Sturgis kick), 3:35. Saints 14–10. **Drive: 8 plays, 81 yards, 4:26.**
- NO – Darren Sproles 13-yard pass from Drew Brees (Garrett Hartley kick), 0:55. Saints 21–10. **Drive: 4 plays, 23 yards, 0:28.**

**Third quarter**

- NO – Benjamin Watson 4-yard pass from Drew Brees (Garrett Hartley kick), 9:44. Saints 28–10. **Drive: 8 plays, 59 yards, 4:23.**
- NO – Jimmy Graham 43-yard pass from Drew Brees (Garrett Hartley kick), 8:12. Saints 35–10. **Drive: 1 play, 43 yards, 0:08.**

**Fourth quarter**

- MIA – Charles Clay 3-yard pass from Ryan Tannehill (Caleb Sturgis kick), 13:48. Saints 35–17. **Drive: 9 plays, 67 yards, 4:05.**
- NO – Garrett Hartley 29-yard field goal, 7:15. Saints 38–17. **Drive: 10 plays, 69 yards, 6:33.**

**Top passers**

- MIA – Ryan Tannehill – 22/35, 249 yards, TD, 3 INT
- NO – Drew Brees – 30/39, 413 yards, 4 TD

**Top rushers**

- MIA – Lamar Miller – 11 rushes, 62 yards, TD
- NO – Khiry Robinson – 12 rushes, 37 yards

**Top receivers**

- MIA – Brandon Gibson – 6 receptions, 71 yards
- NO – Jimmy Graham – 4 receptions, 100 yards, 2 TD

With the win, the Saints improved to 4-0.

==== Week 5: at Chicago Bears ====
Week Five: New Orleans Saints at Chicago Bears – Game summary

Quarter	1	2	3	4	Total
**Saints**	6	14	3	3	**26**
Bears	0	7	3	8	**18**

at Soldier Field, Chicago, Illinois

- Date: October 6
- Game time: 12:00 p.m. CDT
- Game weather: 60 °F (16 °C), sunny
- Game attendance: 62,361
- Referee: Scott Green
- TV announcers (Fox): Joe Buck, Troy Aikman and Pam Oliver
- Recap, Game book

Game information

**First quarter**

- NO – Garrett Hartley 47-yard field goal, 7:38. Saints 3–0. **Drive: 10 plays, 39 yards, 5:23.**
- NO – Garrett Hartley 19-yard field goal, 6:00. Saints 6–0. **Drive: 4 plays, 5 yards, 1:27.**

**Second quarter**

- NO – Pierre Thomas 2-yard pass from Drew Brees (Garrett Hartley kick), 5:57. Saints 13–0. **Drive: 6 plays, 72 yards, 3:22.**
- CHI – Alshon Jeffery 3-yard pass from Jay Cutler (Robbie Gould kick), 2:41. Saints 13–7. **Drive: 7 plays, 80 yards, 3:16.**
- NO – Pierre Thomas 25-yard pass from Drew Brees (Garrett Hartley kick), 0:23. Saints 20–7. **Drive: 7 plays, 71 yards, 2:18.**

**Third quarter**

- NO – Garrett Hartley 36-yard field goal, 8:03. Saints 23–7. **Drive: 13 plays, 60 yards, 6:57.**
- CHI – Robbie Gould 27-yard field goal, 4:56. Saints 23–10. **Drive: 9 plays, 71 yards, 3:07.**

**Fourth quarter**

- NO – Garrett Hartley 48-yard field goal, 3:01. Saints 26–10. **Drive: 12 plays, 44 yards, 5:39.**
- CHI – Brandon Marshall 2-yard pass from Jay Cutler (Matt Forte run), 2:11. Saints 26–18. **Drive: 4 plays, 82 yards, 0:50.**

**Top passers**

- NO – Drew Brees – 29/35, 288 yards, 2 TD
- CHI – Jay Cutler – 24/33, 358 yards, 2 TD

**Top rushers**

- NO – Pierre Thomas – 19 rushes, 36 yards
- CHI – Matt Forte – 12 rushes, 55 yards

**Top receivers**

- NO – Jimmy Graham – 10 receptions, 135 yards
- CHI – Alshon Jeffery – 10 receptions, 218 yards, TD

With the win at Chicago, they improve to 5-0. This was the second time the Saints beat the Bears.

==== Week 6: at New England Patriots ====
Week Six: New Orleans Saints at New England Patriots – Game summary

Quarter	1	2	3	4	Total
Saints	7	0	10	10	**27**
**Patriots**	3	14	3	10	**30**

at Gillette Stadium, Foxborough, Massachusetts

- Date: October 13
- Game time: 4:25 p.m. EDT/3:25 p.m. CDT
- Game weather: 59 °F (15 °C), partly cloudy
- Game attendance: 68,756
- Referee: Tony Corrente
- TV announcers (Fox): Thom Brennaman, Troy Aikman and Pam Oliver
- Recap, Game book

Game information

**First quarter**

- NE – Stephen Gostkowski 35-yard field goal, 9:54. Patriots 3–0. **Drive: 14 plays, 60 yards, 5:06.**
- NO – Travaris Cadet 3-yard pass from Drew Brees (Garrett Hartley kick), 1:46. Saints 7–3. **Drive: 9 plays, 73 yards, 5:23.**

**Second quarter**

- NE – Stevan Ridley 1-yard run (Stephen Gostkowski kick), 13:00. Patriots 10–7. **Drive: 9 plays, 80 yards, 3:46.**
- NE – Stevan Ridley 4-yard run (Stephen Gostkowski kick), 7:36. Patriots 17–7. **Drive: 12 plays, 66 yards, 4:52.**

**Third quarter**

- NO – Garrett Hartley 28-yard field goal, 11:27. Patriots 17–10. **Drive: 8 plays, 70 yards, 3:33.**
- NO – Khiry Robinson 3-yard run (Garrett Hartley kick), 6:19. Tied 17–17. **Drive: 9 plays, 67 yards, 4:07.**
- NE – Stephen Gostkowski 54-yard field goal, 1:36. Patriots 20–17. **Drive: 12 plays, 55 yards, 4:43.**

**Fourth quarter**

- NE – Stephen Gostkowski 35-yard field goal, 8:34. Patriots 23–17. **Drive: 7 plays, 15 yards, 3:36.**
- NO – Kenny Stills 34-yard pass from Drew Brees (Garrett Hartley kick), 3:29. Saints 24–23. **Drive: 10 plays, 81 yards, 5:05.**
- NO – Garrett Hartley 39-yard field goal, 2:24. Saints 27–23. **Drive: 4 plays, 3 yards, 0:22.**
- NE – Kenbrell Thompkins 17-yard pass from Tom Brady (Stephen Gostkowski kick), 0:05. Patriots 30–27. **Drive: 8 plays, 70 yards, 1:08.**

**Top passers**

- NO – Drew Brees – 17/36, 236 yards, 2 TD, INT
- NE – Tom Brady – 25/43, 269 yards, TD, INT

**Top rushers**

- NO – Khiry Robinson – 7 rushes, 53 yards, TD
- NE – Stevan Ridley – 20 rushes, 96 yards, 2 TD

**Top receivers**

- NO – Kenny Stills – 3 receptions, 64 yards, TD
- NE – Aaron Dobson – 6 receptions, 63 yards

The Saints meet the Patriots on the road. Despite stopping Tom Brady and the Patriots offense twice in the last 3 minutes of the game, the Saints defense proceeded to give up a game-winning touchdown pass with 5 seconds left on the clock. With the close loss, the Saints fall to 5-1, their first loss of the season.

==== Week 8: vs. Buffalo Bills ====
Week Eight: Buffalo Bills at New Orleans Saints – Game summary

Quarter	1	2	3	4	Total
Bills	0	10	0	7	**17**
**Saints**	7	14	7	7	**35**

at Mercedes-Benz Superdome, New Orleans, Louisiana

- Date: October 27
- Game time: 12:00 p.m. CDT
- Game weather: Played indoors (dome stadium)
- Game attendance: 72,405
- Referee: Terry McAulay
- TV announcers (CBS): Greg Gumbel and Dan Dierdorf
- Recap, Game book

Game information

**First quarter**

- NO – Lance Moore 15-yard pass from Drew Brees (Garrett Hartley kick), 4:44. Saints 7–0. **Drive: 3 plays, 21 yards, 1:21.**

**Second quarter**

- BUF – Stevie Johnson 13-yard pass from Thad Lewis (Dan Carpenter kick), 10:44. Tied 7–7. **Drive: 8 plays, 72 yards, 4:07.**
- BUF – Dan Carpenter 37-yard field goal, 4:35. Bills 10–7. **Drive: 9 plays, 43 yards, 3:58.**
- NO – Kenny Stills 69-yard pass from Drew Brees (Garrett Hartley kick), 3:43. Saints 14–10. **Drive: 2 plays, 86 yards, 0:52.**
- NO – Jimmy Graham 15-yard pass from Drew Brees (Garrett Hartley kick), 0:30. Saints 21–10. **Drive: 9 plays, 77 yards, 2:48.**

**Third quarter**

- NO – Jimmy Graham 13-yard pass from Drew Brees (Garrett Hartley kick), 5:15. Saints 28–10. **Drive: 6 plays, 57 yards, 3:25.**

**Fourth quarter**

- BUF – Fred Jackson 1-yard run (Dan Carpenter kick), 14:20. Saints 28–17. **Drive: 12 plays, 80 yards, 5:55.**
- NO – Kenny Stills 42-yard pass from Drew Brees (Garrett Hartley kick), 7:34. Saints 35–17. **Drive: 6 plays, 51 yards, 2:58.**

**Top passers**

- BUF – Thad Lewis – 22/39, 234 yards, TD, INT
- NO – Drew Brees – 26/34, 332 yards, 5 TD

**Top rushers**

- BUF – Fred Jackson – 15 rushes, 45 yards, TD
- NO – Pierre Thomas – 14 rushes, 65 yards

**Top receivers**

- BUF – Stevie Johnson – 7 receptions, 72 yards, TD
- NO – Kenny Stills – 3 receptions, 129 yards, 2 TD

Coming off a loss to New England on the road, they face the Bills at home. With the win, they improve to 6-1.

==== Week 9: at New York Jets ====
Week Nine: New Orleans Saints at New York Jets – Game summary

Quarter	1	2	3	4	Total
Saints	7	7	3	3	**20**
**Jets**	3	17	3	3	**26**

at MetLife Stadium, East Rutherford, New Jersey

- Date: November 3
- Game time: 1:00 p.m. EST/12:00 p.m. CST
- Game weather: 48 °F (9 °C)
- Game attendance: 76,957
- Referee: Clete Blakeman
- TV announcers (Fox): Kevin Burkhardt, John Lynch and Molly McGrath
- Recap, Game book

Game information

**First quarter**

- NYJ – Nick Folk 39-yard field goal, 5:41. Jets 3–0. **Drive: 5 plays, 27 yards, 1:53.**
- NO – Jimmy Graham 51-yard pass from Drew Brees (Garrett Hartley kick), 2:45. Saints 7–3. **Drive: 6 plays, 81 yards, 2:56.**

**Second quarter**

- NYJ – Nick Folk 21-yard field goal, 10:04. Saints 7–6. **Drive: 11 plays, 93 yards, 4:56.**
- NO – Jimmy Graham 10-yard pass from Drew Brees (Garrett Hartley kick), 7:51. Saints 14–6. **Drive: 5 plays, 80 yards, 2:13.**
- NYJ – Chris Ivory 3-yard run (Nick Folk kick), 2:39. Saints 14–13. **Drive: 8 plays, 61 yards, 5:12.**
- NYJ – Geno Smith 3-yard run (Nick Folk kick), 0:37. Jets 20–14. **Drive: 5 plays, 39 yards, 1:35.**

**Third quarter**

- NYJ – Nick Folk 47-yard field goal, 11:57. Jets 23–14. **Drive: 7 plays, 50 yards, 3:03.**
- NO – Garrett Hartley 55-yard field goal, 1:46. Jets 23–17. **Drive: 9 plays, 34 yards, 5:00.**

**Fourth quarter**

- NYJ – Nick Folk 45-yard field goal, 11:56. Jets 26–17. **Drive: 8 plays, 53 yards, 4:50.**
- NO – Garrett Hartley 43-yard field goal, 3:06. Jets 26–20. **Drive: 11 plays, 60 yards, 3:06.**

**Top passers**

- NO – Drew Brees – 30/51, 382 yards, 2 TD, 2 INT
- NYJ – Geno Smith – 8/19, 115 yards

**Top rushers**

- NO – Pierre Thomas – 6 rushes, 24 yards
- NYJ – Chris Ivory – 18 rushes, 139 yards, TD

**Top receivers**

- NO – Jimmy Graham – 9 receptions, 116 yards, 2 TD
- NYJ – Greg Salas – 2 receptions, 57 yards

==== Week 10: vs. Dallas Cowboys ====
Week Ten: Dallas Cowboys at New Orleans Saints – Game summary

Quarter	1	2	3	4	Total
Cowboys	3	7	7	0	**17**
**Saints**	7	21	7	14	**49**

at Mercedes-Benz Superdome, New Orleans, Louisiana

- Date: November 10
- Game time: 7:30 p.m. CST
- Game weather: Played indoors (dome stadium)
- Game attendance: 73,018
- Referee: Jerome Boger
- TV announcers (NBC): Al Michaels, Cris Collinsworth and Michele Tafoya
- Recap, Game book

Game information

**First quarter**

- DAL – Dan Bailey 37-yard field goal, 8:14. Cowboys 3–0. **Drive: 4 plays, 4 yards, 1:22.**
- NO – Marques Colston 22-yard pass from Drew Brees (Garrett Hartley kick), 3:23. Saints 7–3. **Drive: 9 plays, 80 yards, 4:51.**

**Second quarter**

- DAL – DeMarco Murray 7-yard run (Dan Bailey kick), 14:05. Cowboys 10–7. **Drive: 8 plays, 72 yards, 4:18.**
- NO – Pierre Thomas 1-yard pass from Drew Brees (Garrett Hartley kick), 5:09. Saints 14–10. **Drive: 15 plays, 80 yards, 8:56.**
- NO – Darren Sproles 3-yard run (Garrett Hartley kick), 1:32. Saints 21–10. **Drive: 9 plays, 52 yards, 2:29.**
- NO – Darren Sproles 28-yard pass from Drew Brees (Garrett Hartley kick), 0:05. Saints 28–10. **Drive: 6 plays, 75 yards, 0:48.**

**Third quarter**

- NO – Mark Ingram 4-yard run (Garrett Hartley kick), 2:12. Saints 35–10. **Drive: 6 plays, 92 yards, 2:43.**
- DAL – Terrance Williams 21-yard pass from Tony Romo (Dan Bailey kick), 0:41. Saints 35–17. **Drive: 5 plays, 89 yards, 1:31.**

**Fourth quarter**

- NO – Kenny Stills 52-yard pass from Drew Brees (Garrett Hartley kick), 12:43. Saints 42–17. **Drive: 6 plays, 83 yards, 2:30.**
- NO – Pierre Thomas 1-yard run (Garrett Hartley kick), 5:44. Saints 49–17. **Drive: 8 plays, 78 yards, 5:27.**

**Top passers**

- DAL – Tony Romo – 10/24, 128 yards, TD
- NO – Drew Brees – 34/41, 392 yards, 4 TD

**Top rushers**

- DAL – DeMarco Murray – 16 rushes, 89 yards, TD
- NO – Mark Ingram – 14 rushes, 145 yards, TD

**Top receivers**

- DAL – Dez Bryant – 1 reception, 44 yards
- NO – Marques Colston – 7 receptions, 107 yards, TD

The Saints would dominate the Cowboys at home in the Superdome, recording an NFL-record 40 first downs and 625 total yards of offense. This improves their record to 7-2.

==== Week 11: vs. San Francisco 49ers ====
Week Eleven: San Francisco 49ers at New Orleans Saints – Game summary

Quarter	1	2	3	4	Total
49ers	0	10	7	3	**20**
**Saints**	7	7	0	9	**23**

at Mercedes-Benz Superdome, New Orleans, Louisiana

- Date: November 17
- Game time: 3:25 p.m. CST
- Game weather: Played indoors (dome stadium)
- Game attendance: 73,025
- Referee: Tony Corrente
- TV announcers (Fox): Joe Buck, Troy Aikman and Pam Oliver
- Recap, Game book

Game information

**First quarter**

- NO – Josh Hill 3-yard pass from Drew Brees (Garrett Hartley kick), 0:44. Saints 7–0. **Drive: 11 plays, 97 yards, 6:44.**

**Second quarter**

- SF – Anquan Boldin 11-yard pass from Colin Kaepernick (Phil Dawson kick), 10:16. Tied 7–7. **Drive: 2 plays, 11 yards, 0:10.**
- SF – Phil Dawson 55-yard field goal, 3:34. 49ers 10–7. **Drive: 6 plays, 43 yards, 2:51.**
- NO – Jed Collins 1-yard run (Garrett Hartley kick), 1:58. Saints 14–10. **Drive: 3 plays, 21 yards, 1:36.**

**Third quarter**

- SF – Vernon Davis 17-yard pass from Colin Kaepernick (Phil Dawson kick), 10:52. 49ers 17–14. **Drive: 6 plays, 43 yards, 2:51.**

**Fourth quarter**

- SF – Phil Dawson 29-yard field goal, 13:23. 49ers 20–14. **Drive: 13 plays, 49 yards, 6:11.**
- NO – Garrett Hartley 21-yard field goal, 7:50. 49ers 20–17. **Drive: 9 plays, 77 yards, 5:33.**
- NO – Garrett Hartley 42-yard field goal, 2:06. Tied 20–20. **Drive: 12 plays, 48 yards, 4:42.**
- NO – Garrett Hartley 31-yard field goal, 0:00. Saints 23–20. **Drive: 6 plays, 47 yards, 1:41.**

**Top passers**

- SF – Colin Kaepernick – 17/31, 127 yards, 2 TD, INT
- NO – Drew Brees – 30/43, 305 yards, TD, INT

**Top rushers**

- SF – Frank Gore – 13 rushes, 48 yards
- NO – Pierre Thomas – 11 rushes, 49 yards

**Top receivers**

- SF – Anquan Boldin – 6 receptions, 56 yards, TD
- NO – Marques Colston – 5 receptions, 80 yards

The Saints beat the defending NFC Champion San Francisco 49ers with a game-winning field goal. With the victory, they improve to 8-2.

==== Week 12: at Atlanta Falcons ====
Week Twelve: New Orleans Saints at Atlanta Falcons – Game summary

Quarter	1	2	3	4	Total
**Saints**	7	7	3	0	**17**
Falcons	7	6	0	0	**13**

at Georgia Dome, Atlanta, Georgia

- Date: November 21
- Game time: 8:25 p.m. EST/7:25 p.m. CST
- Game weather: Played indoors (dome stadium)
- Game attendance: 70,422
- Referee: Ron Winter
- TV announcers (NFLN): Brad Nessler, Mike Mayock and Alex Flanagan
- Recap, Game book

Game information

**First quarter**

- ATL – Steven Jackson 1-yard run (Matt Bryant kick), 8:48. Falcons 7–0. **Drive: 10 plays, 76 yards, 4:16.**
- NO – Benjamin Watson 1-yard pass from Drew Brees (Garrett Hartley kick), 1:17. Tied 7–7. **Drive: 15 plays, 78 yards, 7:31.**

**Second quarter**

- ATL – Matt Bryant 39-yard field goal, 12:20. Falcons 10–7. **Drive: 7 plays, 59 yards, 3:57.**
- NO – Jimmy Graham 44-yard pass from Drew Brees (Garrett Hartley kick), 10:12. Saints 14–10. **Drive: 5 plays, 80 yards, 2:08.**
- ATL – Matt Bryant 24-yard field goal, 2:41. Saints 14–13. **Drive: 14 plays, 74 yards, 7:31.**

**Third quarter**

- NO – Garrett Hartley 41-yard field goal, 4:37. Saints 17–13. **Drive: 9 plays, 55 yards, 3:55.**

**Fourth quarter**

- No scoring plays.

**Top passers**

- NO – Drew Brees – 23/33, 278 yards, 2 TD
- ATL – Matt Ryan – 30/39, 292 yards

**Top rushers**

- NO – Pierre Thomas – 10 rushes, 73 yards
- ATL – Steven Jackson – 16 rushes, 63 yards, TD

**Top receivers**

- NO – Jimmy Graham – 5 receptions, 100 yards, TD
- ATL – Harry Douglas – 9 receptions, 79 yards

The Saints beat the Falcons on the road. This not only brought the Saints' record to 9-2, but they also sweep the Falcons for the first time since the 2011 season.

==== Week 13: at Seattle Seahawks ====
Week Thirteen: New Orleans Saints at Seattle Seahawks – Game summary

Quarter	1	2	3	4	Total
Saints	0	7	0	0	**7**
**Seahawks**	17	10	7	0	**34**

at CenturyLink Field, Seattle, Washington

- Date: December 2
- Game time: 7:40 p.m. CST/5:40 p.m. PST
- Game weather: 41 °F (5 °C), cloudy
- Game attendance: 68,387
- Referee: Ed Hochuli
- TV announcers (ESPN): Mike Tirico, Jon Gruden and Lisa Salters
- Recap, Game book

Game information

**First quarter**

- SEA – Stephen Hauschka 26-yard field goal, 7:47. Seahawks 3–0. **Drive: 11 plays, 61 yards, 5:44.**
- SEA – Michael Bennett 22-yard fumble return (Stephen Hauschka kick), 6:27. Seahawks 10–0.
- SEA – Zach Miller 2-yard pass from Russell Wilson (Stephen Hauschka kick), 1:55. Seahawks 17–0. **Drive: 6 plays, 73 yards, 2:58.**

**Second quarter**

- NO – Jimmy Graham 2-yard pass from Drew Brees (Garrett Hartley kick), 8:45. Seahawks 17–7. **Drive: 13 plays, 80 yards, 8:10.**
- SEA – Stephen Hauschka 20-yard field goal, 3:41. Seahawks 20–7. **Drive: 10 plays, 82 yards, 5:04.**
- SEA – Doug Baldwin 4-yard pass from Russell Wilson (Stephen Hauschka kick), 0:13. Seahawks 27–7. **Drive: 12 plays, 88 yards, 1:52.**

**Third quarter**

- SEA – Derrick Coleman 8-yard pass from Russell Wilson (Stephen Hauschka kick), 7:07. Seahawks 34–7. **Drive: 8 plays, 79 yards, 3:47.**

**Fourth quarter**

- No scoring plays.

**Top passers**

- NO – Drew Brees – 23/38, 147 yards, TD
- SEA – Russell Wilson – 22/30, 310 yards, 3 TD

**Top rushers**

- NO – Mark Ingram – 8 rushes, 22 yards
- SEA – Russell Wilson – 8 rushes, 47 yards

**Top receivers**

- NO – Jimmy Graham – 3 receptions, 42 yards, TD
- SEA – Zach Miller – 5 receptions, 86 yards, TD

In a Monday Night matchup, the Saints were dominated from the start by the Seahawks. Russell Wilson threw for 310 yard and three touchdowns and rushed for another 47 yards while Seattle's "Legion of Boom" defense limited Drew Brees to 147 yards passing. The loss brought the Saints record down to 9-3.

==== Week 14: vs. Carolina Panthers ====
Week Fourteen: Carolina Panthers at New Orleans Saints – Game summary

Quarter	1	2	3	4	Total
Panthers	6	0	0	7	**13**
**Saints**	0	21	3	7	**31**

at Mercedes-Benz Superdome, New Orleans, Louisiana

- Date: December 8
- Game time: 7:30 p.m. CST
- Game weather: Played indoors (dome stadium)
- Game attendance: 73,089
- Referee: Walt Anderson
- TV announcers (NBC): Al Michaels, Cris Collinsworth and Michele Tafoya
- Recap, Game book

Game information

**First quarter**

- CAR – Graham Gano 45-yard field goal, 8:42. Panthers 3–0. **Drive: 13 plays, 53 yards, 6:18.**
- CAR – Graham Gano 24-yard field goal, 1:56. Panthers 6–0. **Drive: 9 plays, 26 yards, 5:12.**

**Second quarter**

- NO – Marques Colston 6-yard pass from Drew Brees (Garrett Hartley kick), 13:35. Saints 7–6. **Drive: 9 plays, 80 yards, 3:21.**
- NO – Marques Colston 15-yard pass from Drew Brees (Garrett Hartley kick), 2:44. Saints 14–6. **Drive: 11 plays, 86 yards, 5:44.**
- NO – Jimmy Graham 5-yard pass from Drew Brees (Garrett Hartley kick), 0:18. Saints 21–6. **Drive: 7 plays, 76 yards, 1:43.**

**Third quarter**

- NO – Garrett Hartley 19-yard field goal, 4:18. Saints 24–6. **Drive: 13 plays, 60 yards, 6:01.**

**Fourth quarter**

- NO – Jimmy Graham 8-yard pass from Drew Brees (Garrett Hartley kick), 9:52. Saints 31–6. **Drive: 8 plays, 58 yards, 3:46.**
- CAR – Steve Smith Sr. 17-yard pass from Cam Newton (Graham Gano kick), 5:15. Saints 31–13. **Drive: 11 plays, 61 yards, 4:37.**

**Top passers**

- CAR – Cam Newton – 22/34, 160 yards, TD
- NO – Drew Brees – 30/42, 313 yards, 4 TD

**Top rushers**

- CAR – DeAngelo Williams – 13 rushes, 52 yards
- NO – Darren Sproles – 1 rush, 38 yards

**Top receivers**

- CAR – Steve Smith Sr. – 6 receptions, 49 yards, TD
- NO – Marques Colston – 9 receptions, 125 yards, 2 TD

The Saints would beat the Panthers 31-13, thus improving to 10-3.

==== Week 15: at St. Louis Rams ====
Week Fifteen: New Orleans Saints at St. Louis Rams – Game summary

Quarter	1	2	3	4	Total
Saints	0	3	0	13	**16**
**Rams**	14	10	3	0	**27**

at Edward Jones Dome, St. Louis, Missouri

- Date: December 15
- Game time: 3:25 p.m. CST
- Game weather: Played indoors (dome stadium)
- Game attendance: 58,442
- Referee: Mike Carey
- TV announcers (Fox): Chris Myers, Tim Ryan and Jennifer Hale
- Recap, Game book

Game information

**First quarter**

- STL – Cory Harkey 31-yard pass from Kellen Clemens (Greg Zuerlein kick), 11:20. Rams 7–0. **Drive: 1 play, 31 yards, 0:07.**
- STL – Lance Kendricks 4-yard pass from Kellen Clemens (Greg Zuerlein kick), 2:45. Rams 14–0. **Drive: 9 plays, 93 yards, 4:49.**

**Second quarter**

- STL – Greg Zuerlein 31-yard field goal, 14:57. Rams 17–0. **Drive: 6 plays, 34 yards, 2:48.**
- NO – Garrett Hartley 45-yard field goal, 10:17. Rams 17–3. **Drive: 8 plays, 53 yards, 4:40.**
- STL – Zac Stacy 40-yard run (Greg Zuerlein kick), 4:10. Rams 24–3. **Drive: 5 plays, 82 yards, 2:13.**

**Third quarter**

- STL – Greg Zuerlein 35-yard field goal, 2:42. Rams 27–3. **Drive: 10 plays, 39 yards, 5:30.**

**Fourth quarter**

- NO – Drew Brees 1-yard run (run failed), 11:25. Rams 27–9. **Drive: 14 plays, 80 yards, 6:17.**
- NO – Marques Colston 5-yard pass from Drew Brees (Garrett Hartley kick), 3:07. Rams 27–16. **Drive: 18 plays, 80 yards, 5:07.**

**Top passers**

- NO – Drew Brees – 39/56, 393 yards, TD, 2 INT
- STL – Kellen Clemens – 14/20, 158 yards, 2 TD

**Top rushers**

- NO – Darren Sproles – 7 rushes, 24 yards
- STL – Zac Stacy – 28 rushes, 133 yards, TD

**Top receivers**

- NO – Marques Colston – 8 receptions, 92 yards, TD
- STL – Austin Pettis – 4 receptions, 41 yards

The Saints meet the Rams on the road. The Rams, however, were able to pull off an upset victory. The Saints drop to 10-4.

==== Week 16: at Carolina Panthers ====
Week Sixteen: New Orleans Saints at Carolina Panthers – Game summary

Quarter	1	2	3	4	Total
Saints	0	6	0	7	**13**
**Panthers**	0	7	3	7	**17**

at Bank of America Stadium, Charlotte, North Carolina

- Date: December 22
- Game time: 1:00 p.m. EST/12:00 p.m. CST
- Game weather: 72 °F (22 °C), rainy
- Game attendance: 73,825
- Referee: Gene Steratore
- TV announcers (Fox): Joe Buck, Troy Aikman and Pam Oliver
- Recap, Game book

Game information

**First quarter**

- No scoring plays.

**Second quarter**

- NO – Shayne Graham 40-yard field goal, 10:49. Saints 3–0. **Drive: 8 plays, 45 yards, 4:22.**
- NO – Shayne Graham 24-yard field goal, 7:22. Saints 6–0. **Drive: 7 plays, 46 yards, 3:27.**
- CAR – DeAngelo Williams 43-yard run (Graham Gano kick), 1:45. Panthers 7–6. **Drive: 1 play, 43 yards, 0:09.**

**Third quarter**

- CAR – Graham Gano 40-yard field goal, 7:21. Panthers 10–6. **Drive: 7 plays, 44 yards, 3:33.**

**Fourth quarter**

- NO – Jimmy Graham 5-yard pass from Drew Brees (Shayne Graham kick), 6:37. Saints 13–10. **Drive: 11 plays, 97 yards, 5:59.**
- CAR – Domenik Hixon 14-yard pass from Cam Newton (Graham Gano kick), 0:23. Panthers 17–13. **Drive: 5 plays, 65 yards, 0:32.**

**Top passers**

- NO – Drew Brees – 30/44, 281 yards, TD, 2 INT
- CAR – Cam Newton – 13/22, 181 yards, TD, INT

**Top rushers**

- NO – Mark Ingram – 13 rushes, 83 yards
- CAR – DeAngelo Williams – 12 rushes, 67 yards, TD

**Top receivers**

- NO – Jimmy Graham – 5 receptions, 73 yards, TD
- CAR – Ted Ginn Jr. – 2 receptions, 66 yards

At Bank of America Stadium, the Saints meet the Panthers again. The Saints fall to a close loss by 4 points, allowing a go-ahead touchdown pass with 23 seconds remaining. This drops their record to 10–5. This loss cost the Saints clinching a playoff berth, the NFC South, and a first-round bye. In addition, the Panthers moved ahead of the Saints in the NFC South.

==== Week 17: vs. Tampa Bay Buccaneers ====
Week Seventeen: Tampa Bay Buccaneers at New Orleans Saints – Game summary

Quarter	1	2	3	4	Total
Buccaneers	7	7	3	0	**17**
**Saints**	14	14	7	7	**42**

at Mercedes-Benz Superdome, New Orleans, Louisiana

- Date: December 29
- Game time: 3:25 p.m. CST
- Game weather: Played indoors (dome stadium)
- Game attendance: 73,150
- Referee: Carl Cheffers
- TV announcers (Fox): Thom Brennaman, Brian Billick and Laura Okmin
- Recap, Game book

Game information

**First quarter**

- NO – Lance Moore 44-yard pass from Drew Brees (Shayne Graham kick), 10:15. Saints 7–0. **Drive: 9 plays, 80 yards, 4:45.**
- TB – Tiquan Underwood 48-yard pass from Mike Glennon (Rian Lindell kick), 8:40. Tied 7–7. **Drive: 4 plays, 62 yards, 1:35.**
- NO – Jimmy Graham 10-yard pass from Drew Brees (Shayne Graham kick), 3:08. Saints 14–7. **Drive: 9 plays, 80 yards, 5:32.**

**Second quarter**

- NO – Robert Meachem 41-yard pass from Drew Brees (Shayne Graham kick), 8:04. Saints 21–7. **Drive: 5 plays, 57 yards, 1:29.**
- TB – Tim Wright 1-yard pass from Mike Glennon (Rian Lindell kick), 3:28. Saints 21–14. **Drive: 9 plays, 80 yards, 4:36.**
- NO – Kenny Stills 76-yard pass from Drew Brees (Shayne Graham kick), 2:40. Saints 28–14. **Drive: 3 plays, 80 yards, 0:48.**

**Third quarter**

- TB – Rian Lindell 54-yard field goal, 6:35. Saints 28–17. **Drive: 13 plays, 44 yards, 8:25.**
- NO – Pierre Thomas 8-yard run (Shayne Graham kick), 1:22. Saints 35–17. **Drive: 10 plays, 92 yards, 5:13.**

**Fourth quarter**

- NO – Drew Brees 9-yard run (Shayne Graham kick), 14:08. Saints 42–17. **Drive: 4 plays, 25 yards, 2:05.**

**Top passers**

- TB – Mike Glennon – 22/41, 219 yards, 2 TD, INT
- NO – Drew Brees – 24/31, 381 yards, 4 TD

**Top rushers**

- TB – Brian Leonard – 5 rushes, 35 yards
- NO – Khiry Robinson – 12 rushes, 50 yards

**Top receivers**

- TB – Tiquan Underwood – 5 receptions, 93 yards, TD
- NO – Kenny Stills – 1 reception, 76 yards, TD

The Saints were able to sweep the Tampa Bay Buccaneers for the second straight season with the victory. They finished the season 11-5, clinching a playoff berth as the NFC's #6 seed and would face the #3 seeded Eagles in the wild-card round.

=== Standings ===
==== Division ====
NFC South
	W	L	T	PCT	DIV	CONF	PF	PA	STK
^{(2)} Carolina Panthers	12	4	0	.750	5–1	9–3	366	241	W3
^{(6)} New Orleans Saints	11	5	0	.688	5–1	9–3	414	304	W1
Atlanta Falcons	4	12	0	.250	1–5	3–9	353	443	L2
Tampa Bay Buccaneers	4	12	0	.250	1–5	2–10	288	389	L3

==== Conference ====
NFC
#	Team	Division	W	L	T	PCT	DIV	CONF	SOS	SOV	STK
**Division winners**
1	Seattle Seahawks	West	13	3	0	.813	4–2	10–2	.490	.445	W1
2	Carolina Panthers	South	12	4	0	.750	5–1	9–3	.494	.451	W3
3	Philadelphia Eagles	East	10	6	0	.625	4–2	9–3	.453	.391	W2
4	Green Bay Packers	North	8	7	1	.531	3–2–1	6–5–1	.453	.371	W1
**Wild cards**
5	San Francisco 49ers	West	12	4	0	.750	5–1	9–3	.494	.414	W6
6	New Orleans Saints	South	11	5	0	.688	5–1	9–3	.516	.455	W1
**Did not qualify for the postseason**
7	Arizona Cardinals	West	10	6	0	.625	2–4	6–6	.531	.444	L1
8 (Note: Chicago defeated Dallas head-to-head (Week 14, 45–28).)	Chicago Bears	North	8	8	0	.500	2–4	4–8	.465	.469	L2
9	Dallas Cowboys	East	8	8	0	.500	5–1	7–5	.484	.363	L1
10 (Note: The NY Giants and Detroit finished with a better conference record than St. Louis.) (Note: The NY Giants defeated Detroit head-to-head (Week 16, 23–20 (OT)).)	New York Giants	East	7	9	0	.438	3–3	6–6	.520	.366	W2
11 (Note: Detroit finished with a better conference record than St. Louis.)	Detroit Lions	North	7	9	0	.438	4–2	6–6	.457	.402	L4
12	St. Louis Rams	West	7	9	0	.438	1–5	4–8	.551	.446	L1
13	Minnesota Vikings	North	5	10	1	.344	2–3–1	4–7–1	.512	.450	W1
14 (Note: Atlanta finished with a better conference record than Tampa Bay.)	Atlanta Falcons	South	4	12	0	.250	1–5	3–9	.553	.313	L2
15	Tampa Bay Buccaneers	South	4	12	0	.250	1–5	2–10	.574	.391	L3
16	Washington Redskins	East	3	13	0	.188	0–6	1–11	.516	.438	L8
**Tiebreakers** (Note: When breaking ties for three or more teams under the NFL's rules, they are first broken within divisions, then comparing only the highest-ranked remaining team from each division.)

== Postseason ==
=== Schedule ===
Playoff round	Date	Opponent	Result	Record	Game site	NFL.com recap
Wild Card	January 4, 2014	at Philadelphia Eagles (3)	W 26–24	1–0	Lincoln Financial Field	Recap
Divisional	January 11, 2014	at Seattle Seahawks (1)	L 15–23	1–1	CenturyLink Field	Recap

=== Game summaries ===
==== NFC Wild Card Round: at #3 Philadelphia Eagles ====
NFC Wild Card Round: #6 New Orleans Saints at #3 Philadelphia Eagles – Game summary

Quarter	1	2	3	4	Total
Saints	0	6	14	6	26
Eagles	0	7	7	10	24

at Lincoln Financial Field, Philadelphia, Pennsylvania

- Date: January 4, 2014
- Game time: 8:10 p.m. EST/7:10 p.m. CST
- Game weather: 25 °F (−4 °C), clear
- Game attendance: 69,144
- Referee: Bill Vinovich
- TV announcers (NBC): Al Michaels, Cris Collinsworth and Michele Tafoya
- Recap, Game book

Game information

First quarter

- No scoring plays.

Second quarter

- NO – Shayne Graham 36-yard field goal, 8:37. Saints 3–0. Drive: 11 plays, 43 yards, 5:45.
- PHI – Riley Cooper 10-yard pass from Nick Foles (Alex Henery kick), 1:48. Eagles 7–3. Drive: 6 plays, 44 yards, 2:44.
- NO – Shayne Graham 46-yard field goal, 0:00. Eagles 7–6. Drive: 8 plays, 47 yards, 1:48.

Third quarter

- NO – Lance Moore 24-yard pass from Drew Brees (Shayne Graham kick), 10:08. Saints 13–7. Drive: 6 plays, 53 yards, 3:34.
- NO – Mark Ingram 4-yard run (Shayne Graham kick), 3:54. Saints 20–7. Drive: 8 plays, 66 yards, 4:52.
- PHI – LeSean McCoy 1-yard run (Alex Henery kick), 0:32. Saints 20–14. Drive: 7 plays, 65 yards, 3:22.

Fourth quarter

- PHI – Alex Henery 31-yard field goal, 11:14. Saints 20–17. Drive: 7 plays, 28 yards, 2:59.
- NO – Shayne Graham 35-yard field goal, 8:04. Saints 23–17. Drive: 7 plays, 58 yards, 3:10.
- PHI – Zach Ertz 3-yard pass from Nick Foles (Alex Henery kick), 4:54. Eagles 24–23. Drive: 8 plays, 77 yards, 3:10.
- NO – Shayne Graham 32-yard field goal, 0:00. Saints 26–24. Drive: 10 plays, 34 yards, 4:54.

Top passers

- NO – Drew Brees – 20/30, 250 yards, TD, 2 INT
- PHI – Nick Foles – 23/33, 195 yards, 2 TD

Top rushers

- NO – Mark Ingram – 18 rushes, 97 yards, TD
- PHI – LeSean McCoy – 21 rushes, 77 yards, TD

Top receivers

- NO – Jimmy Graham – 3 receptions, 44 yards
- PHI – Riley Cooper – 6 receptions, 68 yards, TD

In their first playoff matchup since the 2006 season, the Saints defeated the Eagles and earned their first postseason win on the road. Drew Brees threw for 250 yards and one touchdown, Mark Ingram rushed for 97 yards and another touchdown, and Shayne Graham went 4-for-4 on field goals, including the game winner with no time left on the clock. Graham started the scoring with a 36-yard field goal in the second quarter. Philadelphia struck back with a 10-yard touchdown pass from Nick Foles to Riley Cooper, but Graham hit another field goal at the end of the half to pull the Saints to within one at 7-6. Early in the third quarter the Saints got their first touchdown when Brees connected with Lance Moore for a 24-yard touchdown pass to take a 13-7 lead, and the Saints extended it to 20-7 on a one-yard run by Ingram. However, Philadelphia came back with a touchdown drive of their own to pull to within six at 20-14 on the strength of a 40-yard completion from Foles to DeSean Jackson to the Saints 9-yard line and a one-yard run by McCoy for the TD. The Eagles got the ball back in the fourth quarter and pulled to within three on the strength of a 31-yard field goal by Eagles K Alex Henery. The Saints responded with Graham's third field of the night from 35 yards out to make the score 23-17, but Philadelphia went on a 73-yard drive to take the lead, aided by a pass interference on Saints cornerback Corey White and a three-yard touchdown pass from Foles to TE Zach Ertz. On the ensuing kickoff, Saints returner Darren Sproles returned the ball to the Saints 37 and then had fifteen more tacked on because of a horse-collar tackle by the Eagles' Cary Williams. Brees then methodically led the Saints on a 10-play, 34-yard drive to the Eagles' 14 where Graham put his fourth field goal through the uprights for a 26-24 lead as time expired.

==== NFC Divisional Round: at #1 Seattle Seahawks ====
NFC Divisional Round: #6 New Orleans Saints at #1 Seattle Seahawks – Game summary

Quarter	1	2	3	4	Total
Saints	0	0	0	15	15
Seahawks	6	10	0	7	23

at CenturyLink Field, Seattle, Washington

- Date: January 11, 2014
- Game time: 3:35 p.m. CST/1:35 p.m. PST
- Game weather: 48 °F (9 °C), rain
- Game attendance: 68,388
- Referee: Terry McAulay
- TV announcers (Fox): Kevin Burkhardt, John Lynch and Erin Andrews
- Recap, Game book

Game information

First quarter

- SEA – Steven Hauschka 38-yard field goal, 10:19. Seahawks 3–0. Drive: 6 plays, 20 yards, 3:20.
- SEA – Steven Hauschka 49-yard field goal, 0:37. Seahawks 6–0. Drive: 9 plays, 34 yards, 4:26.

Second quarter

- SEA – Marshawn Lynch 15-yard run (Steven Hauschka kick), 14:17. Seahawks 13–0. Drive: 2 plays, 24 yards, 0:34.
- SEA – Steven Hauschka 26-yard field goal, 1:18. Seahawks 16–0. Drive: 12 plays, 63 yards, 4:44.

Third quarter

- No scoring plays

Fourth quarter

- NO – Khiry Robinson 1-yard run (Mark Ingram II run), 13:11. Seahawks 16–8. Drive: 9 plays, 74 yards, 4:27.
- SEA – Marshawn Lynch 31-yard run (Steven Hauschka kick), 2:40. Seahawks 23–8. Drive: 4 plays, 62 yards, 1:11.
- NO – Marques Colston 9-yard pass from Drew Brees (Shayne Graham kick), 0:26. Seahawks 23–15. Drive: 9 plays, 80 yards, 2:14.

Top passers

- NO – Drew Brees – 24/43, 309 yards, 1 TD
- SEA – Russell Wilson – 9/18, 103 yards

Top rushers

- NO – Khiry Robinson – 13 rushes, 57 yards, 1 TD
- SEA – Marshawn Lynch – 28 rushes, 140 yards, 2 TD

Top receivers

- NO – Marques Colston – 11 receptions, 144 yards, 1 TD
- SEA – Doug Baldwin – 2 receptions, 30 yards

In a much different game than the earlier Monday Night Football matchup, the Saints lost to the Seahawks under stormy and freezing conditions in Seattle. Despite Drew Brees' 309 yards passing, the Saints fumbled once and PK Shane Graham missed two field goal attempts. Seattle jumped out to a 16-0 lead on three Stephen Hauschka field goals and a 15-yard touchdown run by Marshawn Lynch. The Saints got back into the game in the fourth quarter with a 1-yard touchdown rush by Khiry Robinson and a two-point conversion run by Mark Ingram. However, Seattle struck again, this time with a 31-yard touchdown rush by Lynch. The Saints scored their final touchdown on a 9-yard pass from Brees to Marques Colston with only 26 seconds remaining, but the Saints had a chance to tie the game when they recovered the onsides kick. A final attempt at a pass followed by laterals fell short as time expired, sending Seattle to the NFC Championship and the Saints home with a 12-6 record. Lynch finished with a game-high 140 yards on 28 attempts for Seattle while Colston caught 11 balls for 144 yards in a losing effort for the Saints.
