= 2014 New Orleans Saints season =

NFL team season

- Owner: Tom Benson
- General manager: Mickey Loomis
- Head coach: Sean Payton
- Offensive coordinator: Pete Carmichael Jr.
- Defensive coordinator: Rob Ryan
- Home stadium: Mercedes-Benz Superdome

Results
- Record: 7–9
- Division place: 2nd NFC South
- Playoffs: Did not qualify
- Pro Bowlers: 4: QB Drew Brees; RB Mark Ingram II; TE Jimmy Graham; G Jahri Evans

Uniform
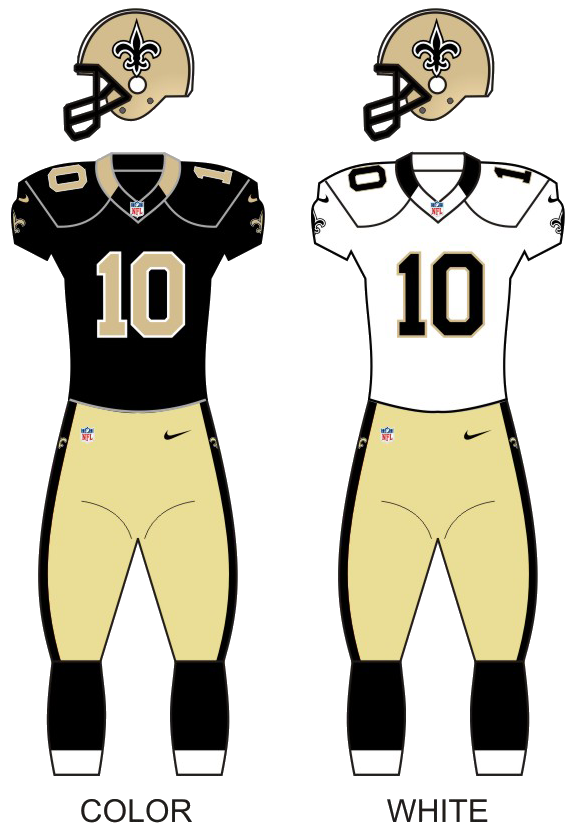

The 2014 season was the New Orleans Saints' 48th in the National Football League (NFL), their 39th playing home games at the Mercedes-Benz Superdome and their eighth under head coach Sean Payton.

After they lost to the Atlanta Falcons in Week 16, the Saints were officially eliminated from postseason contention for the first time since 2012.

== 2014 draft class ==
2014 New Orleans Saints Draft
Round	Selection	Player	Position	College
1	20	Brandin Cooks	Wide receiver	Oregon State
2	58	Stanley Jean-Baptiste	Cornerback	Nebraska
3	None — see draft trades below			
4	126	Khairi Fortt	Inside linebacker	California
5	167	Vinnie Sunseri	Safety	Alabama
5	169	Ronald Powell	Outside linebacker	Florida
6	202	Tavon Rooks	Offensive tackle	Kansas State
7	None — see draft trades below			

Draft trades

- The Saints traded their first- and third-round selections (Nos. 27 and 91 overall, respectively) to the Arizona Cardinals in exchange for the Cardinals' first-round selection (No. 20 overall).
- The Saints acquired an additional fifth-round selection (No. 169 overall) in a trade that sent running back Darren Sproles to the Philadelphia Eagles.
- The Saints traded their seventh-round selection (No. 242 overall) to the San Francisco 49ers in exchange for linebacker Parys Haralson.

== Staff ==
2014 New Orleans Saints staff
Front office: Owner/chairman – Tom Benson; Owner/vice chairman – Rita Benson LeBlanc; President – Dennis Lauscha; Executive vice president/general manager – Mickey Loomis; Director of college scouting – Rick Reiprish; Director of football administration – Khai Harley; Director of player personnel – Ryan Pace; Director of pro scouting – Terry Fontenot; Head coaches: Head coach – Sean Payton; Assistant head coach/linebackers – Joe Vitt; Offensive coaches: Offensive coordinator – Pete Carmichael, Jr.; Quarterbacks – Mike Neu; Running backs – Dan Roushar; Wide receivers – Henry Ellard; Assistant wide receivers – Carter Sheridan; Tight ends – Terry Malone; Offensive line – Bret Ingalls; Assistant offensive line – Frank Smith	Defensive coaches: Defensive coordinator – Rob Ryan; Defensive line – Bill Johnson; Assistant linebackers – Brian Young; Secondary – Wesley McGriff; Assistant secondary – Andre Curtis; Defensive assistant – Marcus Ungaro; Special teams coaches: Special teams coordinator – Greg McMahon; Assistant special teams – Stan Kwan; Strength and conditioning: Head strength and conditioning – Dan Dalrymple; Assistant strength and conditioning – Charles Byrd; Assistant strength and conditioning – Rob Wenning

== Final roster ==
2014 New Orleans Saints roster
Quarterbacks (QB): 9 Drew Brees; 4 Ryan Griffin; 7 Luke McCown; Running backs (RB): 39 Travaris Cadet; 22 Mark Ingram; 41 Erik Lorig FB; 29 Khiry Robinson; Wide receivers (WR): 16 Brandon Coleman; 12 Marques Colston; 17 Robert Meachem; 84 Kenny Stills; 88 Nick Toon; 15 Seantavius Jones; 18 Jalen Saunders; Tight ends (TE): 80 Jimmy Graham; 89 Josh Hill; 82 Ben Watson	Offensive linemen (OL): 72 Terron Armstead T; 67 Nick Becton T; 73 Jahri Evans G; 55 Jonathan Goodwin C; 66 Ben Grubbs G; 79 Bryce Harris T; 65 Senio Kelemete G; 68 Tim Lelito C/G; 64 Zach Strief T; Defensive linemen (DL): 95 Brandon Deaderick DE; 94 Cameron Jordan DE; 75 Tyrunn Walker NT; 62 Lawrence Virgil NT	Linebackers (LB): 91 Kasim Edebali OLB; 52 Moise Fokou ILB; 59 Jerry Franklin OLB; 93 Junior Galette OLB; 98 Parys Haralson OLB; 57 David Hawthorne ILB; 53 Ramon Humber LB; 58 Kyle Knox ILB; 50 Curtis Lofton ILB; 56 Ronald Powell OLB; Defensive backs (DB): 36 Marcus Ball FS; 20 Brian Dixon CB; 37 Terrence Frederick CB; 33 Stanley Jean-Baptiste CB; 28 Keenan Lewis CB; 21 Patrick Robinson CB; 38 Jamarca Sanford SS; 32 Kenny Vaccaro SS; 42 Pierre Warren FS; 24 Corey White CB; Special teams (ST): 47 Justin Drescher LS; 3 Shayne Graham K; 6 Thomas Morstead P	Practice squad: 27 Edwin Baker RB; 70 Mike Brewster C; 81 Orson Charles TE; 5 Dustin Hopkins K; 69 Andrew Miller G; 44 Toben Opurum FB; 74 Tavon Rooks T; 83 Willie Snead WR; Reserve: 77 Brodrick Bunkley NT (IR); 25 Rafael Bush FS (IR); 31 Jairus Byrd FS (IR); 10 Brandin Cooks WR (IR); -- A. J. Davis CB (IR); 97 Glenn Foster DE (IR); 76 Akiem Hicks DE (IR); 92 John Jenkins NT (IR); 35 Austin Johnson FB (IR); 43 Vinnie Sunseri SS (IR); 14 Andy Tanner WR (IR); 23 Pierre Thomas RB (IR); 49 Ty Zimmerman FS (IR); 99 Cheta Ozougwu OLB (PUP); Rookies in italics 53 active, 14 reserve, 8 practice squad

== Schedule ==
=== Preseason ===
In March 2014, the Saints announced an agreement with The Greenbrier resort to hold the team's training camp at the hotel, in White Sulphur Springs, West Virginia, for three years beginning with 2014. The hotel has committed to build three football fields and other facilities for the Saints, at an estimated cost of $20–25 million, adjacent to its sports medicine facilities. The project will be partially subsidized by tax breaks recently approved by the state legislature. The relationship between the hotel and the Saints reportedly grew out of a visit by Saints head coach Sean Payton to the 2013 Greenbrier Classic golf tournament to play in its pro-am competition and then to serve as caddie for his friend, PGA Tour golfer Ryan Palmer.

Week	Date	Opponent	Result	Record	Venue	Recap
1	August 8	at St. Louis Rams	**W** 26–24	1–0	Edward Jones Dome	Recap
2	August 15	Tennessee Titans	**W** 31–24	2–0	Mercedes-Benz Superdome	Recap
3	August 23	at Indianapolis Colts	**W** 23–17	3–0	Lucas Oil Stadium	Recap
4	August 28	Baltimore Ravens	**L** 13–22	3–1	Mercedes-Benz Superdome	Recap

=== Regular season ===
Week	Date	Opponent	Result	Record	Venue	Recap
1	September 7	at **Atlanta Falcons**	**L** 34–37 (OT)	0–1	Georgia Dome	Recap
2	September 14	at Cleveland Browns	**L** 24–26	0–2	FirstEnergy Stadium	Recap
3	September 21	Minnesota Vikings	**W** 20–9	1–2	Mercedes-Benz Superdome	Recap
4	September 28	at Dallas Cowboys	**L** 17–38	1–3	AT&T Stadium	Recap
5	October 5	**Tampa Bay Buccaneers**	**W** 37–31 (OT)	2–3	Mercedes-Benz Superdome	Recap
6	Bye					
7	October 19	at Detroit Lions	**L** 23–24	2–4	Ford Field	Recap
8	October 26	Green Bay Packers	**W** 44–23	3–4	Mercedes-Benz Superdome	Recap
9	October 30	at **Carolina Panthers**	**W** 28–10	4–4	Bank of America Stadium	Recap
10	November 9	San Francisco 49ers	**L** 24–27 (OT)	4–5	Mercedes-Benz Superdome	Recap
11	November 16	Cincinnati Bengals	**L** 10–27	4–6	Mercedes-Benz Superdome	Recap
12	November 24	Baltimore Ravens	**L** 27–34	4–7	Mercedes-Benz Superdome	Recap
13	November 30	at Pittsburgh Steelers	**W** 35–32	5–7	Heinz Field	Recap
14	December 7	**Carolina Panthers**	**L** 10–41	5–8	Mercedes-Benz Superdome	Recap
15	December 15	at Chicago Bears	**W** 31–15	6–8	Soldier Field	Recap
16	December 21	**Atlanta Falcons**	**L** 14–30	6–9	Mercedes-Benz Superdome	Recap
17	December 28	at **Tampa Bay Buccaneers**	**W** 23–20	7–9	Raymond James Stadium	Recap

Note: Intra-division opponents are in bold text.

=== Game summaries ===
==== Week 1: at Atlanta Falcons ====
Week One: New Orleans Saints at Atlanta Falcons – Game summary

Quarter	1	2	3	4	OT	Total
Saints	6	14	0	14	0	**34**
**Falcons**	0	10	14	10	3	**37**

at Georgia Dome, Atlanta, Georgia

- Date: September 7
- Game time: 1:00 p.m. EDT/12:00 p.m. CDT
- Game weather: Played indoors (dome stadium)
- Game attendance: 70,706
- Referee: Bill Leavy
- TV announcers (Fox): Kevin Burkhardt, John Lynch and Pam Oliver
- Recap, Gamebook

Game information

**First quarter**

- NO – Shayne Graham 31-yard field goal, 10:33. Saints 3–0. **Drive: 9 plays, 67 yards, 4:27.**
- NO – Shayne Graham 50-yard field goal, 4:39. Saints 6–0. **Drive: 10 plays, 28 yards, 3:59.**

**Second quarter**

- NO – Khiry Robinson 2-yard run (Shayne Graham kick), 11:46. Saints 13–0. **Drive: 9 plays, 80 yards, 4:10.**
- ATL – Roddy White 2-yard pass from Matt Ryan (Matt Bryant kick), 4:06. Saints 13–7. **Drive: 14 plays, 80 yards, 7:40.**
- NO – Brandin Cooks 3-yard pass from Drew Brees (Shayne Graham kick), 0:20. Saints 20–7. **Drive: 9 plays, 80 yards, 3:46.**
- ATL – Matt Bryant 40-yard field goal, 0:00. Saints 20–10. **Drive: 3 plays, 58 yards, 0:20.**

**Third quarter**

- ATL – Levine Toilolo 1-yard pass from Matt Ryan (Matt Bryant kick), 9:22. Saints 20–17. **Drive: 12 plays, 80 yards, 5:38.**
- ATL – Antone Smith 54-yard pass from Matt Ryan (Matt Bryant kick), 0:21. Falcons 24–20. **Drive: 5 plays, 80 yards, 2:31.**

**Fourth quarter**

- NO – Mark Ingram 3-yard run (Shayne Graham kick), 8:46. Saints 27–24. **Drive: 12 plays, 80 yards, 6:35.**
- ATL – Jacquizz Rodgers 17-yard run (Matt Bryant kick), 2:50. Falcons 31–27. **Drive: 8 plays, 94 yards, 3:26.**
- NO – Mark Ingram 3-yard run (Shayne Graham kick), 1:20. Saints 34–31. **Drive: 8 plays, 71 yards, 1:30.**
- ATL – Matt Bryant 51-yard field goal, 0:00. Tied 34–34. **Drive: 8 plays, 47 yards, 1:20.**

**Overtime**

- ATL – Matt Bryant 52-yard field goal, 13:17. Falcons 37–34. **Drive: 4 plays, 4 yards, 1:32.**

**Top passers**

- NO – Drew Brees – 29/42, 333 yards, TD, INT
- ATL – Matt Ryan – 31/43, 448 yards, 3 TD

**Top rushers**

- NO – Mark Ingram - 13 rushes, 60 yards, 2 TD
- ATL – Steven Jackson – 12 rushes, 52 yards

**Top receivers**

- NO – Marques Colston - 5 receptions, 110 yards
- ATL – Julio Jones - 7 receptions, 116 yards

==== Week 2: at Cleveland Browns ====
Week Two: New Orleans Saints at Cleveland Browns – Game summary

Quarter	1	2	3	4	Total
Saints	0	10	7	7	**24**
**Browns**	10	6	7	3	**26**

at FirstEnergy Stadium, Cleveland, Ohio

- Date: September 14
- Game time: 1:00 p.m. EDT/12:00 p.m. CDT
- Game weather: 61 °F (16 °C), partly cloudy
- Game attendance: 67,407
- Referee: Craig Wrolstad
- TV announcers (Fox): Kenny Albert, Daryl Johnston and Tony Siragusa
- Recap, Gamebook

Game information

**First quarter**

- CLE – Miles Austin 3-yard pass from Brian Hoyer (Billy Cundiff kick), 5:59. Browns 7–0. **Drive: 9 plays, 51 yards, 3:36.**
- CLE – Billy Cundiff 32-yard field goal, 0:00. Browns 10–0. **Drive: 11 plays, 44 yards, 3:31.**

**Second quarter**

- NO – Shayne Graham 27-yard field goal, 5:16. Browns 10–3. **Drive: 7 plays, 73 yards, 3:28.**
- CLE – Tashaun Gipson 62-yard interception return (run failed), 3:25. Browns 16–3.
- NO – Jimmy Graham 9-yard pass from Drew Brees (Shayne Graham kick), 0:03. Browns 16–10. **Drive: 12 plays, 85 yards, 3:22.**

**Third quarter**

- NO – Jimmy Graham 1-yard pass from Drew Brees (Shayne Graham kick), 9:32. Saints 17–16. **Drive: 8 plays, 57 yards, 3:17.**
- CLE – Terrance West 9 yd run (Billy Cundiff kick), 3:19. Browns 23–17. **Drive: 14 plays, 80 yards, 6:13.**

**Fourth quarter**

- NO – Mark Ingram 1-yard run (Shayne Graham kick), 12:12. Saints 24–23. **Drive: 13 plays, 80 yards, 6:07.**
- CLE – Billy Cundiff 29-yard field goal, 0:03. Browns 26–24. **Drive: 14 plays, 85 yards, 2:43.**

**Top passers**

- NO – Drew Brees - 27/40, 237 yards, 2 TD, INT
- CLE – Brian Hoyer - 24/40, 204 yards, TD

**Top rushers**

- NO – Mark Ingram - 11 rushes, 83 yards, TD
- CLE – Terrance West - 19 rushes, 68 yards, TD

**Top receivers**

- NO – Jimmy Graham - 10 receptions, 118 yards, 2 TD
- CLE – Andrew Hawkins - 6 receptions, 70 yards

This was the Browns' first home opener win since 2004, and also marked Johnny Manziel's NFL debut. The defense, primarily by rotating DB's Tashaun Gipson, Buster Skrine, rookie Justin Gilbert and Joe Haden, were able to neutralize TE Jimmy Graham and QB Drew Brees for almost the entire first half. Rookie Terrence West, who had 2500+ all-purpose yards at Division II-school Towson Univ., ran for almost 70 yards and one touchdown. Billy Cundiff hit the game-winning FG as time expired.

==== Week 3: vs. Minnesota Vikings ====
Week Three: Minnesota Vikings at New Orleans Saints – Game summary

Quarter	1	2	3	4	Total
Vikings	0	6	3	0	**9**
**Saints**	13	0	0	7	**20**

at Mercedes-Benz Superdome, New Orleans, Louisiana

- Date: September 21
- Game time: 12:00 p.m. CDT
- Game weather: Played indoors (dome stadium)
- Game attendance: 73,005
- Referee: Walt Anderson
- TV announcers (Fox): Chris Myers, Ronde Barber and Jennifer Hale
- Recap, Gamebook

Game information

**First quarter**

- NO – Pierre Thomas 1-yard run (Shayne Graham kick), 9:36. Saints 7–0. **Drive: 11 plays, 80 yards, 5:24.**
- NO – Josh Hill 34-yard pass from Drew Brees (kick blocked), 4:50. Saints 13–0. **Drive: 7 plays, 82 yards, 3:39.**

**Second quarter**

- MIN – Blair Walsh 25-yard field goal, 14:06. Saints 13–3. **Drive: 13 plays, 71 yards, 5:44.**
- MIN – Blair Walsh 30-yard field goal, 6:28. Saints 13–6. **Drive: 10 plays, 51 yards, 5:47.**

**Third quarter**

- MIN – Blair Walsh 40-yard field goal, 10:20. Saints 13–9. **Drive: 10 plays, 43 yards, 4:40.**

**Fourth quarter**

- NO – Marques Colston 18-yard pass from Drew Brees (Shayne Graham kick), 12:22. Saints 20–9. **Drive: 12 plays, 90 yards, 5:28.**

**Top passers**

- MIN – Teddy Bridgewater – 12/20, 150 yards
- NO – Drew Brees – 27/35, 293 yards, 2 TD

**Top rushers**

- MIN – Matt Asiata – 12 rushes, 35 yards
- NO – Khiry Robinson – 18 rushes, 69 yards

**Top receivers**

- MIN – Greg Jennings – 5 rec, 70 yards
- NO – Brandin Cooks – 8 rec, 74 yards

After initially stating that Adrian Peterson would return to the active roster for their Week 3 game at New Orleans, the Vikings later placed the running back on the inactive list indefinitely, pending the outcome of the court case against him. Despite coming into the game at 0–2, the Saints started well, scoring two touchdowns on their first two drives, although DE Everson Griffen was able to block the extra point attempt on the second. The Vikings responded to going 13–0 down with two field goals from 25 and 30 yards respectively, but an injury to Matt Cassel meant a debut for rookie QB Teddy Bridgewater.

==== Week 4: at Dallas Cowboys ====
Week Four: New Orleans Saints at Dallas Cowboys – Game summary

Quarter	1	2	3	4	Total
Saints	0	0	3	14	**17**
**Cowboys**	7	17	7	7	**38**

at AT&T Stadium, Arlington, Texas

- Date: September 28
- Game time: 7:30 p.m. CDT
- Game weather: Played indoors (retractable roof closed)
- Game attendance: 91,176
- Referee: Gene Steratore
- TV announcers (NBC): Al Michaels, Cris Collinsworth and Michele Tafoya
- Recap, Gamebook

Game information

**First quarter**

- DAL – Terrance Williams 6-yard pass from Tony Romo (Dan Bailey kick), 7:50. Cowboys 7–0. **Drive: 12 plays, 80 yards, 7:10.**

**Second quarter**

- DAL – Dan Bailey 51-yard field goal, 5:38. Cowboys 10–0. **Drive: 7 plays, 36 yards, 3:29.**
- DAL – DeMarco Murray 15-yard run (Dan Bailey kick), 4:03. Cowboys 17–0. **Drive: 2 plays, 39 yards, 0:54.**
- DAL – Terrance Williams 23-yard pass from Tony Romo (Dan Bailey kick), 0:19. Cowboys 24–0. **Drive: 9 plays, 77 yards, 2:54.**

**Third quarter**

- NO – Shayne Graham 30-yard field goal, 11:10. Cowboys 24–3. **Drive: 10 plays, 68 yards, 3:50.**
- DAL – DeMarco Murray 28-yard run (Dan Bailey kick), 6:42. Cowboys 31–3. **Drive: 8 plays, 76 yards, 4:28.**

**Fourth quarter**

- NO – Josh Hill 12-yard pass from Drew Brees (Shayne Graham kick), 13:35. Cowboys 31–10. **Drive: 2 plays, 74 yards, 0:25.**
- NO – Jimmy Graham 13-yard pass from Drew Brees (Shayne Graham kick), 9:49. Cowboys 31–17. **Drive: 5 plays, 59 yards, 1:38.**
- DAL – Dez Bryant 18-yard pass from Tony Romo (Dan Bailey kick), 3:34. Cowboys 38–17. **Drive: 6 plays, 39 yards, 3:13.**

**Top passers**

- NO – Drew Brees – 32/44, 340 yards, 2 TD, INT
- DAL – Tony Romo – 22/29, 262 yards, 3 TD

**Top rushers**

- NO – Khiry Robinson – 8 rushes, 87 yards
- DAL – DeMarco Murray – 24 rushes, 149 yards, 2 TD

**Top receivers**

- NO – Jimmy Graham – 8 receptions, 86 yards, TD
- DAL – Terrance Williams – 6 receptions, 77 yards, 2 TD

==== Week 5: vs. Tampa Bay Buccaneers ====
Week Five: Tampa Bay Buccaneers at New Orleans Saints – Game summary

Quarter	1	2	3	4	OT	Total
Buccaneers	0	10	14	7	0	**31**
**Saints**	6	7	7	11	6	**37**

at Mercedes-Benz Superdome, New Orleans, Louisiana

- Date: October 5
- Game time: 12:00 p.m. CST
- Game weather: Played indoors (dome stadium)
- Game attendance: 73,004
- Referee: Carl Cheffers
- TV announcers (Fox): Dick Stockton, Kirk Morrison and Kristina Pink
- Recap, Gamebook

Game information

**First quarter**

- NO – Shayne Graham 30-yard field goal, 9:46. Saints 3–0. **Drive: 6 plays, 48 yards, 2:00.**
- NO – Shayne Graham 29-yard field goal, 0:21. Saints 6–0. **Drive: 12 plays, 77 yards, 5:24.**

**Second quarter**

- NO – Pierre Thomas 15-yard pass from Drew Brees (Shayne Graham kick), 10:14. Saints 13–0. **Drive: 6 plays, 60 yards, 2:59.**
- TB – Patrick Murray 55-yard field goal, 1:54. Saints 13–3. **Drive: 8 plays, 19 yards, 3:24.**
- TB – Louis Murphy 20-yard pass from Mike Glennon (Patrick Murray kick), 0:20. Saints 13–10. **Drive: 4 plays, 40 yards, 1:01.**

**Third quarter**

- TB – Bobby Rainey 9-yard run (Patrick Murray kick), 11:59. Buccaneers 17–13. **Drive: 7 plays, 80 yards, 3:01.**
- TB – Danny Lansanah 33-yard interception return (Patrick Murray kick), 11:20. Buccaneers 24–13.
- NO – Travaris Cadet 5-yard pass from Drew Brees (Shayne Graham kick), 4:57. Buccaneers 24–20. **Drive: 12 plays, 63 yards, 6:23.**

**Fourth quarter**

- TB – Robert Herron 9-yard pass from Mike Glennon (Patrick Murray kick), 13:28. Buccaneers 31–20. **Drive: 10 plays, 81 yards, 6:29.**
- NO – Pierre Thomas 27-yard run (pass failed), 9:28. Buccaneers 31–26. **Drive: 10 plays, 78 yards, 4:00.**
- NO – Mike Glennon sacked in the endzone by Junior Galette for a safety, 6:44. Buccaneers 31–28.
- NO – Shayne Graham 44-yard field goal, 2:30. Tied 31–31. **Drive: 8 plays, 34 yards, 4:14.**

**Overtime**

- NO – Khiry Robinson 18-yard run, 9:24. Saints 37–31. **Drive: 12 plays, 80 yards, 5:36.**

**Top passers**

- TB – Mike Glennon – 19/32, 249 yards, 2 TD, INT
- NO – Drew Brees – 35/57, 371 yards, 2 TD, 3 INT

**Top rushers**

- TB – Doug Martin – 14 rushes, 45 yards
- NO – Khiry Robinson – 21 rushes, 89 yards, TD

**Top receivers**

- TB – Vincent Jackson – 8 receptions, 144 yards
- NO – Pierre Thomas – 8 receptions, 77 yards, TD

==== Week 7: at Detroit Lions ====
Week Seven: New Orleans Saints at Detroit Lions – Game summary

Quarter	1	2	3	4	Total
Saints	0	10	7	6	**23**
**Lions**	0	3	7	14	**24**

at Ford Field, Detroit, Michigan

- Date: October 19
- Game time: 1:00 p.m. EDT/12:00 p.m. CDT
- Game weather: Played indoors (dome stadium)
- Game attendance: 63,271
- Referee: Terry McAulay
- TV announcers (Fox): Chris Myers, Ronde Barber and Jennifer Hale
- Recap, Gamebook

Game information

**First quarter**

- No scoring plays.

**Second quarter**

- NO – Austin Johnson 13-yard pass from Drew Brees (Shayne Graham kick), 13:56. Saints 7–0. **Drive: 4 plays, 29 yards, 1:16.**
- DET – Matt Prater 21-yard field goal, 5:29. Saints 7–3. **Drive: 6 plays, 44 yards, 2:18.**
- NO – Shayne Graham 27-yard field goal, 0:00. Saints 10–3. **Drive: 8 plays, 80 yards, 1:32.**

**Third quarter**

- NO – Kenny Stills 46-yard pass from Drew Brees (Shayne Graham kick), 13:42. Saints 17–3. **Drive: 4 plays, 80 yards, 1:18.**
- DET – Joique Bell 1-yard run (Matt Prater kick), 6:19. Saints 17–10. **Drive: 12 plays, 80 yards, 7:23.**

**Fourth quarter**

- NO – Shayne Graham 48-yard field goal, 13:33. Saints 20–10. **Drive: 11 plays, 69 yards, 5:03.**
- NO – Shayne Graham 36-yard field goal, 5:24. Saints 23–10. **Drive: 6 plays, 31 yards, 3:19.**
- DET – Golden Tate 73-yard pass from Matthew Stafford (Matt Prater kick), 3:38. Saints 23–17. **Drive: 6 plays, 90 yards, 1:46.**
- DET – Corey Fuller 5-yard pass from Matthew Stafford (Matt Prater kick), 1:48. Lions 24–23. **Drive: 6 plays, 14 yards, 1:22.**

**Top passers**

- NO – Drew Brees – 28/45, 342 yards, 2 TD, INT
- DET – Matthew Stafford – 27/40, 299 yards, 2 TD, 2 INT

**Top rushers**

- NO – Khiry Robinson – 3 rushes, 26 yards
- DET – Joique Bell – 18 rushes, 48 yards, TD

**Top receivers**

- NO – Marques Colston – 6 receptions, 111 yards
- DET – Golden Tate – 10 receptions, 154 yards, TD

==== Week 8: vs. Green Bay Packers ====
Week Eight: Green Bay Packers at New Orleans Saints – Game summary

Quarter	1	2	3	4	Total
Packers	10	6	0	7	**23**
**Saints**	10	6	14	14	**44**

at Mercedes-Benz Superdome, New Orleans, Louisiana

- Date: October 26
- Game time: 7:30 p.m. CDT
- Game weather: Played indoors (dome stadium)
- Game attendance: 73,146
- Referee: Ed Hochuli
- TV announcers (NBC): Al Michaels, Cris Collinsworth and Michele Tafoya
- Recap, Gamebook

Game information

**First quarter**

- GB – Randall Cobb 70-yard pass from Aaron Rodgers (Mason Crosby kick), 12:57. Packers 7–0. **Drive: 5 plays, 80 yards, 2:03.**
- NO – Brandin Cooks 4-yard run (Shayne Graham kick), 9:20. Tied 7–7. **Drive: 7 plays, 80 yards, 3:37.**
- GB – Mason Crosby 31-yard field goal, 6:08. Packers 10–7. **Drive: 7 plays, 67 yards, 3:12.**
- NO – Shayne Graham 31-yard field goal, 1:42. Tied 10–10. **Drive: 10 plays, 33 yards, 4:26.**

**Second quarter**

- GB – Mason Crosby 49-yard field goal, 13:08. Packers 13–10. **Drive: 9 plays, 49 yards, 3:34.**
- NO – Shayne Graham 29-yard field goal, 5:52. Tied 13–13. **Drive: 15 plays, 69 yards, 7:16.**
- GB – Mason Crosby 27-yard field goal, 1:51. Packers 16–13. **Drive: 9 plays, 71 yards, 4:01.**
- NO – Shayne Graham 37-yard field goal, 0:00. Tied 16–16. **Drive: 7 plays, 61 yards, 1:51.**

**Third quarter**

- NO – Brandin Cooks 50-yard pass from Drew Brees (Shayne Graham kick), 5:35. Saints 23–16. **Drive: 4 plays, 88 yards, 2:03.**
- NO – Jimmy Graham 22-yard pass from Drew Brees (Shayne Graham kick), 2:06. Saints 30–16. **Drive: 4 plays, 40 yards, 1:26.**

**Fourth quarter**

- NO – Josh Hill 2-yard pass from Drew Brees (Shayne Graham kick), 9:51. Saints 37–16. **Drive: 7 plays, 71 yards, 4:23.**
- GB – Aaron Rodgers 14-yard run (Mason Crosby kick), 5:07. Saints 37–23. **Drive: 11 plays, 80 yards, 4:44.**
- NO – Mark Ingram 21-yard run (Shayne Graham kick), 3:16. Saints 44–23. **Drive: 5 plays, 32 yards, 1:51.**

**Top passers**

- GB – Aaron Rodgers – 28/39, 418 yards, TD, 2 INT
- NO – Drew Brees – 27/32, 311 yards, 3 TD

**Top rushers**

- GB – Eddie Lacy – 13 rushes, 59 yards
- NO – Mark Ingram – 24 rushes, 172 yards, TD

**Top receivers**

- GB – Randall Cobb – 5 receptions, 126 yards, TD
- NO – Brandin Cooks – 6 receptions, 94 yards, TD

This would be only the third game in NFL history to not have a single punt. The Saints also beat the Packers for the first time since the 2008 season.

==== Week 9: at Carolina Panthers ====
Week Nine: New Orleans Saints at Carolina Panthers – Game summary

Quarter	1	2	3	4	Total
**Saints**	0	14	7	7	**28**
Panthers	0	0	7	3	**10**

at Bank of America Stadium, Charlotte, North Carolina

- Date: October 30
- Game time: 8:30 p.m. EDT/7:30 p.m. CDT
- Game weather: 58 °F (14 °C), clear
- Game attendance: 73,663
- Referee: Clete Blakeman
- TV announcers (NFLN): Jim Nantz, Phil Simms and Tracy Wolfson
- Recap, Gamebook

Game information

**First quarter**

- No scoring plays.

**Second quarter**

- NO – Mark Ingram 3-yard run (Shayne Graham kick), 2:38. Saints 7–0. **Drive: 2 plays, 4 yards, 0:42.**
- NO – Jimmy Graham 1-yard pass from Drew Brees (Shayne Graham kick), 0:03. Saints 14–0. **Drive: 10 plays, 85 yards, 1:46.**

**Third quarter**

- CAR – Cam Newton 10-yard run (Graham Gano kick), 10:14. Saints 14–7. **Drive: 10 plays, 81 yards, 4:46.**
- NO – Drew Brees 1-yard run (Shayne Graham kick), 4:04. Saints 21–7. **Drive: 14 plays, 80 yards, 6:10.**

**Fourth quarter**

- CAR – Graham Gano 31-yard field goal, 12:57. Saints 21–10. **Drive: 8 plays, 54 yards, 2:53.**
- NO – Mark Ingram 3-yard run (Shayne Graham kick), 5:30. Saints 28–10. **Drive: 13 plays, 80 yards, 7:27.**

**Top passers**

- NO – Drew Brees – 24/34, 297 yards, TD, INT
- CAR – Cam Newton – 10/28, 151 yards, INT

**Top rushers**

- NO – Mark Ingram – 30 rushes, 100 yards, 2 TD
- CAR – Jonathan Stewart – 8 rushes, 46 yards

**Top receivers**

- NO – Jimmy Graham – 7 receptions, 83 yards, TD
- CAR – Jerricho Cotchery – 5 receptions, 59 yards

==== Week 10: vs. San Francisco 49ers ====
Week Ten: San Francisco 49ers at New Orleans Saints – Game summary

Quarter	1	2	3	4	OT	Total
**49ers**	14	7	0	3	3	**27**
Saints	3	7	7	7	0	**24**

at Mercedes-Benz Superdome, New Orleans, Louisiana

- Date: November 9
- Game time: 12:00 p.m. CST
- Game weather: Played indoors (dome stadium)
- Game attendance: 73,129
- Referee: Bill Vinovich
- TV announcers (Fox): Kevin Burkhardt, John Lynch and Pam Oliver
- Preview, Gamebook

Game information

**First quarter**

- SF – Frank Gore 4-yard run (Phil Dawson kick), 13:01. 49ers 7–0. **Drive: 3 plays, 19 yards, 1:05.**
- SF – Carlos Hyde 9-yard run (Phil Dawson kick), 4:17. 49ers 14–0. **Drive: 13 plays, 79 yards, 7:15.**
- NO – Shayne Graham 40-yard field goal, 0:03. 49ers 14–3. **Drive: 10 plays, 54 yards, 4:14.**

**Second quarter**

- NO – Brandin Cooks 31-yard pass from Drew Brees (Shayne Graham kick), 9:13. 49ers 14–10. **Drive: 5 plays, 60 yards, 2:38.**
- SF – Anquan Boldin 15-yard pass from Colin Kaepernick (Phil Dawson kick), 4:45. 49ers 21–10. **Drive: 8 plays, 80 yards, 4:28.**

**Third quarter**

- NO – Jimmy Graham 11-yard pass from Drew Brees (Shayne Graham kick), 2:49. 49ers 21–17. **Drive: 10 plays, 64 yards, 3:55.**

**Fourth quarter**

- NO – Jimmy Graham 2-yard pass from Drew Brees (Shayne Graham kick), 1:52. Saints 24–21. **Drive: 12 plays, 80 yards, 5:23.**
- SF – Phil Dawson 45-yard field goal, 0:44. Tied 24–24. **Drive: 8 plays, 51 yards, 1:08.**

**Overtime**

- SF – Phil Dawson 35-yard field goal, 5:14. 49ers 27–24. **Drive: 1 play, 0 yards, 0:04.**

**Top passers**

- SF – Colin Kaepernick – 14/32, 210 yards, TD
- NO – Drew Brees – 28/47, 292 yards, 3 TD, 2 INT

**Top rushers**

- SF – Frank Gore – 23 rushes, 81 yards, TD
- NO – Mark Ingram – 27 rushes, 120 yards

**Top receivers**

- SF – Anquan Boldin – 6 receptions, 95 yards, TD
- NO – Brandin Cooks – 5 receptions, 90 yards, TD

With 5 seconds left in regulation, Drew Brees passed a potential game winning Hail Mary pass to Jimmy Graham until he was flagged with offensive interference, which sent the game into overtime where San Francisco won with a field goal after recovering a fumble by Brees. With the loss, the Saints dropped their record to 4-5.

This would snap an 11-game winning streak for Saints when playing at home.

==== Week 11: vs. Cincinnati Bengals ====
Week Eleven: Cincinnati Bengals at New Orleans Saints – Game summary

Quarter	1	2	3	4	Total
**Bengals**	7	6	7	7	**27**
Saints	3	0	0	7	**10**

at Mercedes-Benz Superdome, New Orleans, Louisiana

- Date: November 16
- Game time: 12:00 p.m. CST
- Game weather: Played indoors (dome stadium)
- Game attendance: 73,073
- Referee: Craig Wrolstad
- TV announcers (CBS): Greg Gumbel, Trent Green and Evan Washburn
- Recap, Gamebook

Game information

**First quarter**

- NO – Shayne Graham 31-yard field goal, 8:53. Saints 3–0. **Drive: 14 plays, 67 yards, 6:09.**
- CIN – Jermaine Gresham 12-yard pass from Andy Dalton (Mike Nugent kick), 3:14. Bengals 7–3. **Drive: 12 plays, 77 yards, 5:39.**

**Second quarter**

- CIN – Mike Nugent 22-yard field goal, 2:52. Bengals 10–3. **Drive: 15 plays, 94 yards, 7:25.**
- CIN – Mike Nugent 42-yard field goal, 0:00. Bengals 13–3. **Drive: 3 plays, 60 yards, 0:57.**

**Third quarter**

- CIN – Jermaine Gresham 1-yard pass from Andy Dalton (Mike Nugent kick), 6:03. Bengals 20–3. **Drive: 8 plays, 50 yards, 3:46.**

**Fourth quarter**

- NO – Kenny Stills 9-yard pass from Drew Brees (Shayne Graham kick), 14:56. Bengals 20–10. **Drive: 12 plays, 80 yards, 6:07.**
- CIN – A. J. Green 24-yard pass from Andy Dalton (Mike Nugent kick), 11:29. Bengals 27–10. **Drive: 7 plays, 80 yards, 3:27.**

**Top passers**

- CIN – Andy Dalton – 16/22, 220 yards, 3 TD
- NO – Drew Brees – 33/41, 255 yards, TD

**Top rushers**

- CIN – Jeremy Hill – 27 rushes, 152 yards
- NO – Mark Ingram – 23 rushes, 67 yards

**Top receivers**

- CIN – A. J. Green – 6 receptions, 127 yards, TD
- NO – Marques Colston – 4 receptions, 56 yards

==== Week 12: vs. Baltimore Ravens ====
Week Twelve: Baltimore Ravens at New Orleans Saints – Game summary

Quarter	1	2	3	4	Total
**Ravens**	7	7	10	10	**34**
Saints	7	10	0	10	**27**

at Mercedes-Benz Superdome, New Orleans, Louisiana

- Date: November 24
- Game time: 7:30 p.m. CST
- Game weather: Played indoors (dome stadium)
- Game attendance: 73,373
- Referee: Bill Leavy
- TV announcers (ESPN): Mike Tirico, Jon Gruden and Lisa Salters
- Recap, Gamebook

Game information

**First quarter**

- BAL – Steve Smith Sr. 15-yard pass from Joe Flacco (Justin Tucker kick), 8:13. Ravens 7–0. **Drive: 9 plays, 97 yards, 4:11.**
- NO – Jimmy Graham 10-yard pass from Drew Brees (Shayne Graham kick), 3:20. Tied 7–7. **Drive: 5 plays, 85 yards, 2:44.**

**Second quarter**

- BAL – Justin Forsett 13-yard run (Justin Tucker kick), 9:08. Ravens 14–7. **Drive: 4 plays, 69 yards, 2:05.**
- NO – Shayne Graham 40-yard field goal, 4:00. Ravens 14–10. **Drive: 11 plays, 78 yards, 5:08.**
- NO – Marques Colston 26-yard pass from Drew Brees (Shayne Graham kick), 0:17. Saints 17–14. **Drive: 8 plays, 81 yards, 1:34.**

**Third quarter**

- BAL – Justin Tucker 31-yard field goal, 8:30. Tied 17–17. **Drive: 13 plays, 67 yards, 6:30.**
- BAL – Will Hill 44-yard interception return (Justin Tucker kick), 4:59. Ravens 24–17.

**Fourth quarter**

- BAL – Justin Tucker 55-yard field goal, 10:59. Ravens 27–17. **Drive: 12 plays, 47 yards, 6:26.**
- NO – Shayne Graham 34-yard field goal, 6:33. Ravens 27–20. **Drive: 10 plays, 64 yards, 4:26.**
- BAL – Justin Forsett 20-yard run (Justin Tucker kick), 2:53. Ravens 34–20. **Drive: 6 plays, 80 yards, 3:40.**
- NO – Jimmy Graham 2-yard pass from Drew Brees (Shayne Graham kick), 0:40. Ravens 34–27. **Drive: 11 plays, 80 yards, 2:13.**

**Top passers**

- BAL – Joe Flacco – 18/24, 243 yards, TD
- NO – Drew Brees – 35/45, 420 yards, 3 TD, INT

**Top rushers**

- BAL – Justin Forsett – 22 rushes, 182 yards, 2 TD
- NO – Joe Morgan – 1 rush, 67 yards

**Top receivers**

- BAL – Torrey Smith – 5 receptions, 98 yards
- NO – Kenny Stills – 8 receptions, 98 yards

==== Week 13: at Pittsburgh Steelers ====
Week Thirteen: New Orleans Saints at Pittsburgh Steelers – Game summary

Quarter	1	2	3	4	Total
**Saints**	0	14	14	7	**35**
Steelers	3	3	7	19	**32**

at Heinz Field, Pittsburgh, Pennsylvania

- Date: November 30
- Game time: 1:00 p.m. EST/12:00 p.m. CST
- Game weather: 63 °F (17 °C), cloudy
- Game attendance: 61,916
- Referee: Pete Morelli
- TV announcers (Fox): Thom Brennaman, Donovan McNabb and Charissa Thompson
- Recap, Gamebook

Game information

**First quarter**

- PIT – Shaun Suisham 49-yard field goal, 6:05. Steelers 3–0. **Drive: 7 plays, 34 yards, 3:37.**

**Second quarter**

- PIT – Shaun Suisham 31-yard field goal, 14:05. Steelers 6–0. **Drive: 13 plays, 60 yards, 6:00.**
- NO – Benjamin Watson 15-yard pass from Drew Brees (Shayne Graham kick), 6:04. Saints 7–6. **Drive: 8 plays, 79 yards, 3:43.**
- NO – Erik Lorig 4-yard pass from Drew Brees (Shayne Graham kick), 0:36. Saints 14–6. **Drive: 9 plays, 80 yards, 3:46.**

**Third quarter**

- NO – Nick Toon 11-yard pass from Drew Brees (Shayne Graham kick), 11:25. Saints 21–6. **Drive: 2 plays, 15 yards, 0:43.**
- PIT – Le'Veon Bell 1-yard run (Shaun Suisham kick), 4:21. Saints 21–13. **Drive: 13 plays, 83 yards, 7:03.**
- NO – Kenny Stills 69-yard pass from Drew Brees (Shayne Graham kick), 1:50. Saints 28–13. **Drive: 5 plays, 89 yards, 2:31.**

**Fourth quarter**

- PIT – Shaun Suisham 47-yard field goal, 14:52. Saints 28–16. **Drive: 5 plays, 44 yards, 1:58.**
- NO – Marques Colston 3-yard pass from Drew Brees (Shayne Graham kick), 10:25. Saints 35–16. **Drive: 9 plays, 80 yards, 4:27.**
- PIT – Antonio Brown 4-yard pass from Ben Roethlisberger (Ben Roethlisberger-Antonio Brown pass), 2:34. Saints 35–24. **Drive: 13 plays, 95 yards, 3:20.**
- PIT – Antonio Brown 3-yard pass from Ben Roethlisberger (Ben Roethlisberger-Lance Moore pass), 0:00. Saints 35–32. **Drive: 5 plays, 98 yards, 1:02.**

**Top passers**

- NO – Drew Brees – 19/27, 257 yards, 5 TD
- PIT – Ben Roethlisberger – 32/58, 435 yards, 2 TD, 2 INT

**Top rushers**

- NO – Mark Ingram – 23 rushes, 122 yards
- PIT – Le'Veon Bell – 21 rushes, 95 yards, TD

**Top receivers**

- NO – Kenny Stills – 5 receptions, 162 yards, TD
- PIT – Le'Veon Bell – 8 receptions, 159 yards

The Pittsburgh Steelers was the only team the Saints were able to beat in the AFC North.

==== Week 14: vs. Carolina Panthers ====
Week Fourteen: Carolina Panthers at New Orleans Saints – Game summary

Quarter	1	2	3	4	Total
**Panthers**	17	7	14	3	**41**
Saints	0	3	0	7	**10**

at Mercedes-Benz Superdome, New Orleans, Louisiana

- Date: December 7
- Game time: 12:00 p.m. CST
- Game weather: Played indoors (dome stadium)
- Game attendance: 73,006
- Referee: Walt Coleman
- TV announcers (Fox): Kenny Albert, Daryl Johnston and Tony Siragusa
- Recap, Gamebook

Game information

**First quarter**

- CAR – Kelvin Benjamin 9-yard pass from Cam Newton (Graham Gano kick), 11:42. Panthers 7–0. **Drive: 7 plays, 80 yards, 3:18.**
- CAR – Graham Gano 37-yard field goal, 9:57. Panthers 10–0. **Drive: 4 plays, 6 yards, 1:02.**
- CAR – Cam Newton 2-yard run, 6:41. Panthers 17–0. **Drive: 6 plays, 60 yards, 3:11.**

**Second quarter**

- NO – Shayne Graham 37-yard field goal, 13:19. Panthers 17–3. **Drive: 7 plays, 34 yards, 3:28.**
- CAR – Greg Olsen 16-yard pass from Cam Newton (Graham Gano kick), 2:14. Panthers 24–3. **Drive: 12 plays, 68 yards, 4:46.**

**Third quarter**

- CAR – Jonathan Stewart 69-yard run (Graham Gano kick), 13:59. Panthers 31–3. **Drive: 1 play, 69 yards, 0:11.**
- CAR – Fozzy Whittaker 26-yard pass from Cam Newton (Graham Gano kick), 5:13. Panthers 38–3. **Drive: 9 plays, 86 yards, 5:49.**

**Fourth quarter**

- CAR – Graham Gano 41-yard field goal, 14:10. Panthers 41–3. **Drive: 11 plays, 38 yards, 5:05.**
- NO – Benjamin Watson 7-yard pass from Drew Brees (Shayne Graham kick), 5:29. Panthers 41–10. **Drive: 12 plays, 83 yards, 3:31.**

**Top passers**

- CAR – Cam Newton – 21/33, 226 yards, 3 TD
- NO – Drew Brees – 29/45, 235 yards, TD, INT

**Top rushers**

- CAR – Jonathan Stewart – 20 rushes, 155 yards, TD
- NO – Mark Ingram – 10 rushes, 43 yards

**Top receivers**

- CAR – Greg Olsen – 10 receptions, 72 yards, TD
- NO – Marques Colston – 5 receptions, 72 yards

==== Week 15: at Chicago Bears ====
Week Fifteen: New Orleans Saints at Chicago Bears – Game summary

Quarter	1	2	3	4	Total
**Saints**	0	14	10	7	**31**
Bears	0	0	0	15	**15**

at Soldier Field, Chicago, Illinois

- Date: December 15
- Game time: 7:30 p.m. CST
- Game weather: 44 °F (7 °C), rain showers
- Game attendance: 60,996
- Referee: Carl Cheffers
- TV announcers (ESPN): Mike Tirico, Jon Gruden and Lisa Salters
- Recap, Gamebook

Game information

**First quarter**

- No scoring plays.

**Second quarter**

- NO – Josh Hill 8-yard pass from Drew Brees (Shayne Graham kick), 14:52. Saints 7–0. **Drive: 7 plays, 85 yards, 4:03.**
- NO – Marques Colston 9-yard pass from Drew Brees (Shayne Graham kick), 0:32. Saints 14–0. **Drive: 10 plays, 95 yards, 3:30.**

**Third quarter**

- NO – Josh Hill 7-yard pass from Drew Brees (Shayne Graham kick), 8:35. Saints 21–0. **Drive: 12 plays, 80 yards, 6:25.**
- NO – Shayne Graham 25-yard field goal, 0:16. Saints 24–0. **Drive: 8 plays, 49 yards, 3:05.**

**Fourth quarter**

- CHI – Marquess Wilson 1-yard pass from Jay Cutler (Jay Cutler-Martellus Bennett pass), 12:47. Saints 24–8. **Drive: 7 plays, 56 yards, 2:29.**
- NO – Mark Ingram 15-yard run (Shayne Graham kick), 1:47. Saints 31–8. **Drive: 3 plays, 23 yards, 1:00.**
- CHI – Alshon Jeffery 7-yard pass from Jay Cutler (Jay Feely kick), 0:30. Saints 31–15. **Drive: 4 plays, 71 yards, 1:17.**

**Top passers**

- NO – Drew Brees – 29/36, 375 yards, 3 TD
- CHI – Jay Cutler – 17/31, 194 yards, 2 TD, 3 INT

**Top rushers**

- NO – Mark Ingram – 17 rushes, 59 yards, TD
- CHI – Matt Forte – 16 rushes, 78 yards

**Top receivers**

- NO – Jimmy Graham – 5 receptions, 87 yards
- CHI – Alshon Jeffery – 4 receptions, 78 yards, TD

==== Week 16: vs. Atlanta Falcons ====
Week Sixteen: Atlanta Falcons at New Orleans Saints – Game summary

Quarter	1	2	3	4	Total
**Falcons**	3	10	7	10	**30**
Saints	7	0	0	7	**14**

at Mercedes-Benz Superdome, New Orleans, Louisiana

- Date: December 21
- Game time: 12:00 p.m. CST
- Game weather: Played indoors (dome stadium)
- Game attendance: 73,164
- Referee: John Parry
- TV announcers (Fox): Kevin Burkhardt, John Lynch and Pam Oliver
- Recap, Gamebook

Game information

**First quarter**

- NO – Mark Ingram 1-yard run (Shayne Graham kick), 14:40. Saints 7–0. **Drive: 1 play, 1 yard, 0:20.**
- ATL – Matt Bryant 44-yard field goal, 11:15. Saints 7–3. **Drive: 7 plays, 55 yards, 3:25.**

**Second quarter**

- ATL – Matt Bryant 50-yard field goal, 11:48. Saints 7–6. **Drive: 7 plays, 32 yards, 4:03.**
- ATL – Eric Weems 3-yard pass from Matt Ryan (Matt Bryant kick), 0:03. Falcons 13–7. **Drive: 15 plays, 89 yards, 5:33.**

**Third quarter**

- ATL – Devonta Freeman 31-yard run (Matt Bryant kick), 5:42. Falcons 20–7. **Drive: 7 plays, 86 yards, 3:40.**

**Fourth quarter**

- NO – Jimmy Graham 4-yard pass from Drew Brees (Shayne Graham kick), 5:48. Falcons 20–14. **Drive: 12 plays, 87 yards, 3:40.**
- ATL – Matt Bryant 32-yard field goal, 1:56. Falcons 23–14. **Drive: 4 plays, 0 yards, 0:32.**
- ATL – Osi Umenyiora 86-yard fumble return (Matt Bryant kick), 0:00. Falcons 30–14.

**Top passers**

- ATL – Matt Ryan – 30/40, 322 yards, TD
- NO – Drew Brees – 30/47, 313 yards, TD, 2 INT

**Top rushers**

- ATL – Devonta Freeman – 5 rushes, 36 yards, TD
- NO – Mark Ingram – 13 rushes, 38 yards, TD

**Top receivers**

- ATL – Julio Jones – 7 receptions, 107 yards
- NO – Marques Colston – 6 receptions, 80 yards

With this loss, the Saints were eliminated from playoff contention.

==== Week 17: at Tampa Bay Buccaneers ====
Week Seventeen: New Orleans Saints at Tampa Bay Buccaneers – Game summary

Quarter	1	2	3	4	Total
**Saints**	0	7	0	16	**23**
Buccaneers	3	17	0	0	**20**

at Raymond James Stadium, Tampa, Florida

- Date: December 28
- Game time: 12:00 p.m. CST
- Game weather: 79 °F (26 °C), cloudy
- Game attendance: 59,952
- Referee: Brad Allen
- TV announcers (Fox): Sam Rosen, Kirk Morrison and Peter Schrager
- Recap, Gamebook

Game information

**First quarter**

- TB – Patrick Murray 39-yard field goal, 6:03. Buccaneers 3–0. **Drive: 9 plays, 34 yards, 4:17.**

**Second quarter**

- TB – Mike Evans 6-yard pass from Josh McCown (Patrick Murray kick), 11:25. Buccaneers 10–0. **Drive: 11 plays, 80 yards, 6:23.**
- NO – Khiry Robinson 1-yard run (Shayne Graham kick), 5:45. Buccaneers 10–7. **Drive: 12 plays, 80 yards, 5:40.**
- TB – Charles Sims 8-yard run (Patrick Murray kick), 1:48. Buccaneers 17–7. **Drive: 10 plays, 74 yards, 3:57.**
- TB – Patrick Murray 27-yard field goal, 0:06. Buccaneers 20–7. **Drive: 9 plays, 26 yards, 1:26.**

**Third quarter**

- No scoring plays.

**Fourth quarter**

- NO – Mark Ingram 1-yard run (Shayne Graham kick), 14:02. Buccaneers 20–14. **Drive: 6 plays, 54 yards, 2:28.**
- NO – Marques Colston 36-yard pass from Drew Brees (Shayne Graham kick), 1:57. Saints 21–20. **Drive: 7 plays, 50 yards, 3:23.**
- NO – Josh McCown sacked in the endzone by Junior Galette for a safety, 1:05. Saints 23–20.

**Top passers**

- NO – Drew Brees – 24/38, 281 yards, TD, 3 INT
- TB – Josh McCown – 14/23, 115 yards, TD, INT

**Top rushers**

- NO – Mark Ingram – 14 rushes, 57 yards, TD
- TB – Doug Martin – 19 rushes, 108 yards

**Top receivers**

- NO – Kenny Stills – 5 receptions, 82 yards
- TB – Mike Evans – 5 receptions, 54 yards, TD

== Standings ==
=== Division ===
NFC South
	W	L	T	PCT	DIV	CONF	PF	PA	STK
^{(4)} Carolina Panthers	7	8	1	.469	4–2	6–6	339	374	W4
New Orleans Saints	7	9	0	.438	3–3	6–6	401	424	W1
Atlanta Falcons	6	10	0	.375	5–1	6–6	381	417	L1
Tampa Bay Buccaneers	2	14	0	.125	0–6	1–11	277	410	L6

=== Conference ===
NFC
#	Team	Division	W	L	T	PCT	DIV	CONF	SOS	SOV	STK
Division leaders
1 (Note: Seattle, Green Bay and Dallas were ranked in seeds 1–3 based on conference record.)	Seattle Seahawks	West	12	4	0	.750	5–1	10–2	.525	.513	W6
2	Green Bay Packers	North	12	4	0	.750	5–1	9–3	.482	.440	W2
3	Dallas Cowboys	East	12	4	0	.750	4–2	8–4	.445	.422	W4
4	Carolina Panthers	South	7	8	1	.469	4–2	6–6	.490	.357	W4
Wild Cards
5 (Note: Arizona defeated Detroit head-to-head (Week 11, 14–6).)	Arizona Cardinals	West	11	5	0	.688	3–3	8–4	.523	.477	L2
6	Detroit Lions	North	11	5	0	.688	5–1	9–3	.471	.392	L1
Did not qualify for the postseason
7	Philadelphia Eagles	East	10	6	0	.625	4–2	6–6	.490	.416	W1
8	San Francisco 49ers	West	8	8	0	.500	2–4	7–5	.527	.508	W1
9 (Note: New Orleans defeated Minnesota head-to-head (Week 3, 20–9).)	New Orleans Saints	South	7	9	0	.438	3–3	6–6	.486	.415	W1
10	Minnesota Vikings	North	7	9	0	.438	1–5	6–6	.475	.308	W1
11 (Note: The NY Giants defeated both Atlanta and St. Louis head-to-head (Atlanta: Week 5, 30–20; St. Louis: Week 16, 37–27), while Atlanta finished ahead of St. Louis based on conference record.)	New York Giants	East	6	10	0	.375	2–4	4–8	.512	.323	L1
12	Atlanta Falcons	South	6	10	0	.375	5–1	6–6	.482	.380	L1
13	St. Louis Rams	West	6	10	0	.375	2–4	4–8	.531	.427	L3
14	Chicago Bears	North	5	11	0	.313	1–5	4–8	.529	.338	L5
15	Washington Redskins	East	4	12	0	.250	2–4	2–10	.496	.422	L1
16	Tampa Bay Buccaneers	South	2	14	0	.125	0–6	1–11	.486	.469	L6
Tiebreakers (Note: When breaking ties for three or more teams under the NFL's rules, they are first broken within divisions, then comparing only the highest-ranked remaining team from each division.)
