= Rob Ryan =

American football coach (born 1962)

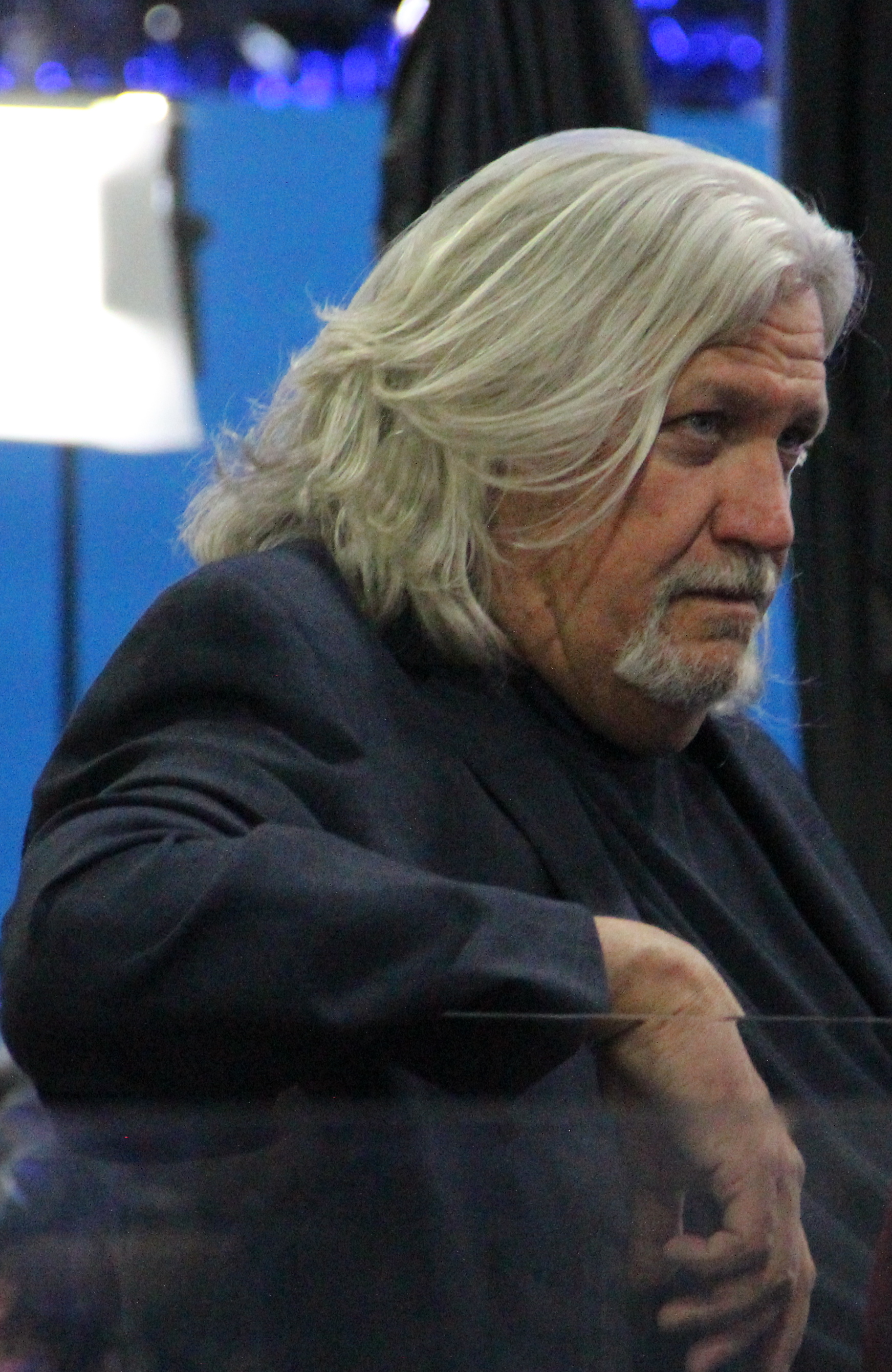
- Ryan in 2019

USC Trojans
- Title: Assistant head coach for defense/linebackers

Personal information
- Born: December 13, 1962 (age 63); Ardmore, Oklahoma, U.S.

Career information
- High school: Stevenson (Lincolnshire, Illinois)
- College: Southwestern Oklahoma State

Career history
- Western Kentucky (1987) Graduate assistant; Ohio State (1988) Graduate assistant; Tennessee State (1989–1993); Running backs coach (1989–1991); Linebackers coach (1992); Defensive line coach (1993); Arizona Cardinals (1994–1995) Defensive backs coach; Hutchinson (1996) Defensive coordinator; Oklahoma State (1997–1999) Defensive coordinator; New England Patriots (2000–2003) Linebackers coach; Oakland Raiders (2004–2008) Defensive coordinator; Cleveland Browns (2009–2010) Defensive coordinator; Dallas Cowboys (2011–2012) Defensive coordinator; New Orleans Saints (2013–2015) Defensive coordinator; Buffalo Bills (2016) Assistant head coach for defense; Washington Redskins (2019) Inside linebackers coach; Baltimore Ravens (2021) Inside linebackers coach; Las Vegas Raiders (2022–2024) Senior defensive assistant; USC (2025–present) Assistant head coach for defense/linebackers

Awards and highlights
- 2× Super Bowl champion (XXXVI, XXXVIII)
- Coaching profile at Pro Football Reference

Robert Allen Ryan (born December 13, 1962) is an American football coach who is currently an assistant head coach for the USC Trojans. Ryan was a defensive coordinator or assistant coach for nine different NFL teams. He was the linebackers coach for the New England Patriots when they won both Super Bowl XXXVI and Super Bowl XXXVIII. Ryan is the son of Buddy Ryan and the twin brother of Rex Ryan.

== Early life and playing career ==
When his parents, Doris and Buddy Ryan, divorced in 1966, Rob and his fraternal twin, Rex, moved with Doris to Toronto. In 1974, they moved back to the United States to live with their father. He attended Stevenson High School in Lincolnshire, Illinois.

Rob played defensive end opposite his brother, Rex, at Southwestern Oklahoma State University.

== Coaching career ==
=== Early career ===
Ryan was a graduate assistant at Western Kentucky in 1987. Then in 1988, he was an assistant coach at Ohio State. He then spent five seasons at Tennessee State, where he coached running backs (1989–91), wide receivers (1992) and the defensive line (1993).

=== Arizona Cardinals ===
Ryan first entered the NFL coaching ranks in 1994 as defensive backs coach on his father's staff for the Arizona Cardinals. He also coached Cardinals cornerbacks and safeties in 1995. With Ryan as his position coach, cornerback Aeneas Williams earned two trips to the Pro Bowl in 1994 and 1995. In 1995, the Cardinals led the NFL with 32 interceptions and 42 total takeaways. The 1994 Cardinals ranked second in the NFL total defense, second in run defense and third in pass defense.

=== Hutchinson ===
After being fired by the Arizona Cardinals, Ryan served as defensive coordinator at Hutchinson Community College in 1996. Ryan's defense led the nation in total defense (228 yards-per-game) and in sacks (56). They also set a national record by forcing 49 turnovers.

=== Oklahoma State ===
In 1997, Ryan became the defensive coordinator at Oklahoma State. While at Oklahoma State, the Cowboys defense continually ranked among the best in the nation, also he was named Coordinator of the Year by The Sporting News in 1997.

In 1999, they were ranked 10th in the nation in total defense. In 1998, they were second in the nation with 41 sacks. In his first season at Oklahoma State, the Cowboys defense finished among the nation top-20 in turnover margin, rushing defense, scoring defense, and total defense, allowing just 302.7 yards-per-game. It was an over 100-yard improvement per game from the year before and helped the Cowboys produce an 8–4 mark and capping the 1997 season with a berth in the Alamo Bowl.

=== New England Patriots ===
Prior to the 2000 season, new Patriots coach Bill Belichick hired Ryan to serve as the linebackers coach for the New England Patriots, where he spent the next four seasons. In 2003, the Patriots ranked first in the NFL in points allowed with 238, while ranking seventh overall in the NFL in total defense. Ryan's unit also contributed to one of the best scoring defenses in franchise history in 2001, as the Patriots allowed just 17 points-per-game and produced Pro Bowlers Willie McGinest and Tedy Bruschi. During his tenure the Patriots won Super Bowl XXXVI over the St. Louis Rams and Super Bowl XXXVIII over the Carolina Panthers.

=== Oakland Raiders ===
Ryan was hired as the defensive coordinator for the Oakland Raiders prior to the 2004 season. In his first season, the Raiders defense ranked 31st in the league, averaging 27.6 points allowed per game. The defense improved in his second season, averaging 23.9 points a game, and moving to 25th in the league. In 2006, the Raiders ranked third in yards-per-game but 18th in points-per-game. In 2007, the Raiders defense ranked 22nd in yards- and 26th in points-per game. In 2008, Ryan's defense ranked 24th with 388 points allowed.

=== Cleveland Browns ===
Eric Mangini named Ryan as defensive coordinator of the Cleveland Browns on January 14, 2009. In his first season in Cleveland, Ryan's defense ranked 21st in the league, with 375 points against, as teams averaged 23.4 points per game against them. In 2010, the Browns were 13th in the league with 332 points allowed.

=== Dallas Cowboys ===
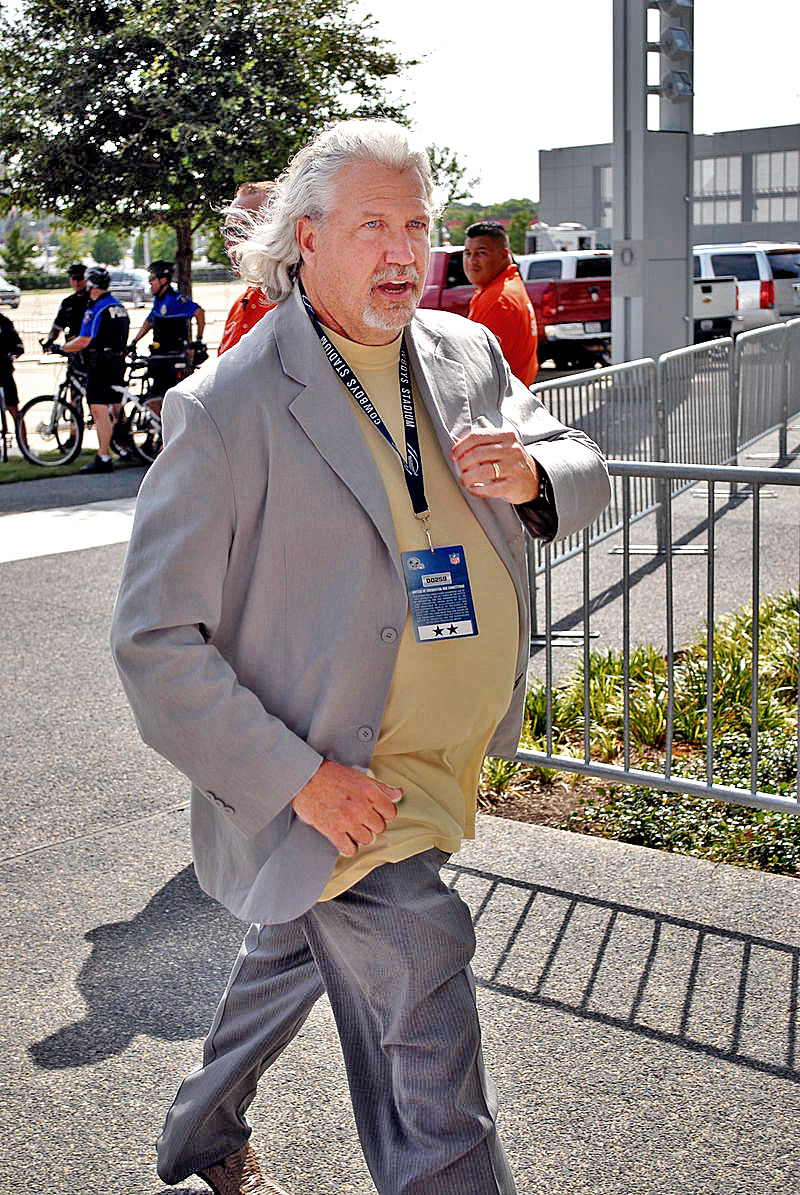
Ryan with the Cowboys in 2012

Ryan was officially named the Dallas Cowboys defensive coordinator on January 19, 2011. In his first season, the Cowboys were ranked 14th in yards-per-game and 16th in points-per-game. In 2012 Dallas was ranked 19th in yards-per-game and 24th in points-per-game while only ranking 16th in sacks. On January 8, 2013, the Cowboys ended Ryan's employment with the franchise.

=== New Orleans Saints ===
In January 2013, Ryan agreed to become the defensive coordinator for the St. Louis Rams, but resigned less than five days later. In February 2013, Ryan was hired as the New Orleans Saints defensive coordinator, implementing a 3–4 defense to the team and scrapping their previous 4–3 defense. Ryan's defense finished well statistically in 2013, including fourth in fewest points-per-game and second for fewest passing yards allowed. The following year, 2014, New Orleans was near the bottom of the league in most defensive categories.

On November 16, 2015, the day after a 47–14 loss to the Washington Redskins, and with New Orleans' defense ranked last in the NFL, Ryan was fired. New Orleans defensive assistant coach Dennis Allen was appointed defensive coordinator following Ryan's dismissal.

=== Buffalo Bills ===
On January 10, 2016, the Bills announced that Ryan would be joining his brother's staff with the Buffalo Bills as assistant head coach. Under Ryan, the Bills started out 0–2, then won four straight games, including a 16–0 shutout of the New England Patriots, the first time that the Bills kept the Patriots scoreless at Gillette Stadium. The Bills entered the bye week at 4–5, then beat the Bengals and Jaguars to climb to 6-5 through week 12. They ranked 12th in the league as of week 13.

On December 27, 2016, the Bills announced they had fired Rob Ryan along with his brother Rex.

=== Washington Redskins ===
On January 30, 2019, Ryan was hired by the Washington Redskins as their inside linebackers coach. On January 5, 2020, the team announced that incoming head coach Ron Rivera had replaced Ryan with Steve Russ.

=== Baltimore Ravens ===
On January 22, 2021, Ryan was hired by the Baltimore Ravens as their inside linebackers coach under defensive coordinator Don Martindale and head coach John Harbaugh. On February 3, 2022, after only one season, Ryan and the Ravens parted ways.

=== Las Vegas Raiders ===
On February 12, 2022, Ryan was hired by the Raiders for a second time, this time as a senior defensive assistant under new defensive coordinator Patrick Graham and under new head coach Josh McDaniels. Ryan and McDaniels previously served as assistant coaches for the New England Patriots under head coach Bill Belichick from 2001 to 2003. The team's defense ranked 26th in 2022, 9th in 2023, and 26th in 2024.

After three years, Ryan left the Raiders to join USC.

=== USC ===
On January 21, 2025, Ryan was hired by USC as the team's assistant head coach for defense/linebackers for the 2025 season.

== Broadcasting ==
In September 2017, Ryan was hired by Fox Sports to host a radio show with Mark Willard. In 2018, Ryan became a weekly analyst of Sky Sports' NFL coverage in the UK and Ireland.

== Personal life ==
Ryan is married to Kristin Ryan and the couple have three children.

In 2012, following in the footsteps of his brother, Ryan had lap band surgery in an attempt to lose weight. The procedure failed. In 2024, Ryan was one of the Raiders' coaches who participated in a modified fitness test, based on the conditioning tests that the players take. Ryan spent two months training for the test and passed it.
