= 2009 New Orleans Saints season =

43rd season in franchise history; first Super Bowl victory

- Owner: Tom Benson
- General manager: Mickey Loomis
- Head coach: Sean Payton
- Offensive coordinator: Pete Carmichael Jr.
- Defensive coordinator: Gregg Williams
- Home stadium: Louisiana Superdome

Results
- Record: 13–3
- Division place: 1st NFC South
- Playoffs: Won Divisional Playoffs (vs. Cardinals) 45–14; Won NFC Championship (vs. Vikings) 31–28 (OT); Won Super Bowl XLIV (vs. Colts) 31–17
- All-Pros: 3: G Jahri Evans (1st team); S Darren Sharper (1st team); QB Drew Brees (2nd team)
- Pro Bowlers: 7: Selected but did not participate due to participation in Super Bowl XLIV: QB Drew Brees; OT Jon Stinchcomb; G Jahri Evans; C Jonathan Goodwin; MLB Jonathan Vilma; FS Darren Sharper; SS Roman Harper

The 2009 season was the New Orleans Saints' 43rd in the National Football League (NFL), and as of the 2025 season's conclusion, the most successful in franchise history. The Saints recorded a franchise record 13 regular season victories (later tied in the 2011, 2018, and 2019 seasons) an improvement on their 8–8 record and fourth-place finish in the NFC South from 2008, and advanced to the playoffs for the first time since 2006 en route to victory in Super Bowl XLIV.

With a victory over division rival Carolina Panthers on November 8, the Saints jumped out to an 8–0 start, the best in franchise history. They went on to set the record for the longest undefeated season opening (13–0) by an NFC team since the AFL–NFL merger, eclipsing the previous record (12–0) held by the 1985 Chicago Bears. This record has since been tied by the 2011 Green Bay Packers and surpassed by their divisional rival Carolina Panthers in 2015. Despite losing the last three games of the season to finish 13–3, the team clinched a playoff berth, a first-round bye and—for the first time ever—the top seed in the NFC. The Saints defeated Kurt Warner and the defending NFC Champions Arizona Cardinals in the NFC Divisional playoffs, and proceeded to host the NFC Championship Game for the first time in franchise history. There, they defeated Brett Favre and the Minnesota Vikings in overtime, then went on to face Peyton Manning and the Indianapolis Colts at Super Bowl XLIV in the franchise's first-ever Super Bowl appearance. The Saints won the Super Bowl 31–17, giving the city of New Orleans its first, and currently only, pro sports championship. The Saints are the first team to defeat three former Super Bowl winning quarterbacks in a row in the playoffs to win the Super Bowl, and were the only team to do so until their division rival Buccaneers did in 2020, with the Buccaneers beating Drew Brees and the Saints in the NFC Divisional. The Saints, along with the New York Jets, are the only teams to go to only one Super Bowl and win it.

Although five Saints were elected to the Pro Bowl (with two others added as injury replacements), since the game was held one week prior to Super Bowl XLIV, they did not participate.

In 2019, the 2009 Saints were ranked No. 30 as the best NFL teams of all time.

The team’s Super Bowl run later became controversial when it was discovered that they had put in a bounty program intent on injuring other quarterbacks such as Kurt Warner, Brett Favre and Aaron Rodgers. Favre’s 2010 season was affected by injuries he sustained in the NFC Championship, and he needed surgery before the season.

== Offseason ==
=== Staff changes ===
- Bill Johnson was named the defensive line coach.
- Gregg Williams replaced Gary Gibbs as the defensive coordinator on January 15, 2009 after Gibbs was fired on January 7, 2009.
- On January 12, 2009, Pete Carmichael, Jr. replaced Doug Marrone as the offensive coordinator after Marrone had resigned from his position in December 2008; Aaron Kromer was named the offensive line coach/running game, and as a result, Bret Ingalls replaced him as the running backs coach; Joe Lombardi was named the quarterbacks coach.

=== Signings ===
| Pos. | Player | Date | Notes |
|---|---|---|---|
| CB | Jabari Greer | March 4, 2009 | |
| FB | Heath Evans | March 5, 2009 | |
| DE | Paul Spicer | March 17, 2009 | |
| C | Nick Leckey | March 17, 2009 | |
| TE | Darnell Dinkins | March 18, 2009 | |
| FS | Darren Sharper | March 18, 2009 | |
| S | Pierson Prioleau | March 26, 2009 | |
| DT | Roderick Coleman | March 27, 2009 | |
| OLB | Anthony Waters | April 15, 2009 | |
| FS | Malcolm Jenkins | April 25, 2009 | #14 overall 2009 NFL Draft pick |
| S | Chip Vaughn | April 26, 2009 | #116 overall 2009 NFL Draft pick |
| MLB | Stanley Arnoux | April 26, 2009 | #118 overall 2009 NFL Draft pick |
| P | Thomas Morstead | April 26, 2009 | #164th overall 2009 NFL Draft pick, acquired as part of a pick trade with the Philadelphia Eagles |
| DT | Anthony Hargrove | May 18, 2009 | |
| LS | Jason Kyle | June 2009 | #126 Overall 1995 NFL Draft pick |
| RB | Deuce McAllister | January 15, 2010 | Resigned to active roster and named honorary team captain. |

=== Departures ===
| Pos. | Player | Date | Notes |
|---|---|---|---|
| WR | David Patten | February 12, 2009 | Placed on waived-injured list |
| RB | Deuce McAllister | February 17, 2009 | Placed on waived-injured list |
| CB | Mike McKenzie | March 19, 2009 | Placed on waived-injured list |
| DT | Brian Young | April 28, 2009 | Placed on waived-injured list |
| DT | Hollis Thomas | April 29, 2009 | Placed on waived-injured list |
| RB | Deuce McAllister | January 19, 2010 | Retires from football and placed on reserve-retired list |

=== NFL draft ===
2009 New Orleans Saints draft
| Round | Pick | Player | Position | College | Notes |
| 1 | 14 | Malcolm Jenkins * | Safety | Ohio State | |
| 4 | 116 | Chip Vaughn | Safety | Wake Forest | |
| 4 | 118 | Stanley Arnoux | Linebacker | Wake Forest | |
| 5 | 164 | Thomas Morstead * | Punter | SMU | |
Made roster * Made at least one Pro Bowl during career

== Personnel ==
=== Final roster ===
2009 New Orleans Saints roster
| Quarterbacks (QB): 9 Drew Brees; 11 Mark Brunell; 10 Chase Daniel; Running backs (RB): 21 Mike Bell; 25 Reggie Bush PR; 36 Kyle Eckel FB; 30 Lynell Hamilton; 23 Pierre Thomas; Wide receivers (WR): 12 Marques Colston; 19 Devery Henderson PR; 17 Robert Meachem KR; 16 Lance Moore; 15 Courtney Roby KR; Tight ends (TE): 80 Darnell Dinkins; 84 Tory Humphrey; 88 Jeremy Shockey; 85 David Thomas | Offensive linemen (OL): 74 Jermon Bushrod T; 73 Jahri Evans G; 76 Jonathan Goodwin C; 60 Nick Leckey C; 67 Jamar Nesbit G; 77 Carl Nicks G; 78 Jon Stinchcomb T; 64 Zach Strief T; Defensive linemen (DL): 92 Remi Ayodele DT; 97 Jeff Charleston DE; 98 Sedrick Ellis DT; 94 Charles Grant DE; 69 Anthony Hargrove DT; 95 Rodney Leisle DT; 93 Bobby McCray DE; 90 DeMario Pressley DT; 91 Will Smith DE | Linebackers (LB): 52 Jonathan Casillas OLB; 54 Troy Evans OLB; 55 Scott Fujita OLB; 50 Marvin Mitchell MLB; 58 Scott Shanle OLB; 51 Jonathan Vilma MLB; 59 Anthony Waters OLB; Defensive backs (DB): 20 Randall Gay CB; 32 Jabari Greer CB; 41 Roman Harper SS; 27 Malcolm Jenkins CB; 22 Tracy Porter CB; 31 Pierson Prioleau SS; 39 Chris Reis SS; 42 Darren Sharper FS; 28 Usama Young FS; Special teams (ST): 5 Garrett Hartley K; 57 Jason Kyle LS; 6 Thomas Morstead P | Practice squad: 87 Adrian Arrington WR; 33 Darrick Brown CB; 75 Tim Duckworth G; 38 Greg Fassitt CB; 66 Earl Heyman DT; 82 Tyler Lorenzen TE; 79 Jermey Parnell T; Reserve: 57 Stanley Arnoux LB (IR); 70 Jammal Brown T (IR); 89 Dan Campbell TE (IR); 71 Kendrick Clancy DT (IR); 56 Jo-Lonn Dunbar LB (IR); 44 Heath Evans FB (IR); 13 Rod Harper WR (IR); 35 Reggie Jones CB (IR); 46 Marcus Mailei FB (IR); 83 Billy Miller TE (IR); 53 Mark Simoneau LB (IR); 24 Leigh Torrence CB (IR); 37 Chip Vaughn S (IR); -- D'Juan Woods WR (IR); Rookies in italics 53 active, 14 reserve, 7 practice squad |

==== Depth chart ====
Defense
2009 New Orleans Saints roster

FS
Darren Sharper
⋅

| WLB | MLB | SLB |
|---|---|---|
| ⋅ | Jonathan Vilma | ⋅ |
| ⋅ | ⋅ | ⋅ |

SS
Roman Harper
⋅

CB
Jabari Greer
Randall Gay

| DE | DT | DT | DE |
|---|---|---|---|
| Will Smith | Sedrick Ellis | Remi Ayodele | Charles Grant |
| ⋅ | Anthony Hargrove | ⋅ | ⋅ |

CB
Tracy Porter
Malcolm Jenkins

Offense
2009 New Orleans Saints roster

WR
Marques Colston
Robert Meachem

WR
Robert Meachem
⋅

| LT | LG | C | RG | RT |
|---|---|---|---|---|
| Jermon Bushrod | Carl Nicks | Jonathan Goodwin | Jahri Evans | Jon Stinchcomb |
| ⋅ | ⋅ | ⋅ | ⋅ | ⋅ |

TE
Jeremy Shockey
David Thomas

WR
Devery Henderson
Lance Moore

QB
Drew Brees
⋅

Special teams
PK John Carney
PK Garrett Hartley
P Thomas Morstead
KR Courtney Roby
PR Reggie Bush

RB
Pierre Thomas
Reggie Bush

=== Coaching staff ===
New Orleans Saints 2009 staff
| Front office: Owner – Tom Benson; Owner/executive vice president – Rita Benson LeBlanc; Executive vice president/general manager – Mickey Loomis; Director of football administration – Khai Harley; Director of pro scouting – Ryan Pace; Director of college scouting – Rick Reiprish; Assistant director of college scouting – Brian Adams; Head coaches: Head coach – Sean Payton; Assistant head coach/linebackers – Joe Vitt; Offensive coaches: Offensive coordinator – Pete Carmichael, Jr.; Quarterbacks – Joe Lombardi; Running backs – Bret Ingalls; Wide receivers – Curtis Johnson; Tight ends – Terry Malone; Offensive line/running game – Aaron Kromer; Offensive assistant/assistant player programs – Carter Sheridan | Defensive coaches: Defensive coordinator – Gregg Williams; Defensive line – Bill Johnson; Assistant defensive line – Travis Jones; Secondary – Dennis Allen; Assistant secondary – Tony Oden; Defensive assistant/linebackers – Adam Zimmer; Special teams coaches: Special teams coordinator – Greg McMahon; Assistant special teams – Mike Mallory; Strength and conditioning: Head strength and conditioning – Dan Dalrymple; Assistant strength and conditioning – Adam Bailey; Strength and conditioning assistant – Charles Byrd; Coaching assistants: Mike Cerullo, Blake Williams |

== Preseason ==
| Week | Date | Opponent | Result | Record | Venue | Recap |
|---|---|---|---|---|---|---|
| 1 | August 14 | Cincinnati Bengals | W 17–7 | 1–0 | Louisiana Superdome | Recap |
| 2 | August 22 | at Houston Texans | W 38–14 | 2–0 | Reliant Stadium | Recap |
| 3 | August 29 | at Oakland Raiders | W 45–7 | 3–0 | Oakland–Alameda County Coliseum | Recap |
| 4 | September 3 | Miami Dolphins | L 7–10 | 3–1 | Louisiana Superdome | Recap |

== Regular season ==
=== Schedule ===
| Week | Date | Opponent | Result | Record | Venue | Recap |
|---|---|---|---|---|---|---|
| 1 | September 13 | Detroit Lions | W 45–27 | 1–0 | Louisiana Superdome | Recap |
| 2 | September 20 | at Philadelphia Eagles | W 48–22 | 2–0 | Lincoln Financial Field | Recap |
| 3 | September 27 | at Buffalo Bills | W 27–7 | 3–0 | Ralph Wilson Stadium | Recap |
| 4 | October 4 | New York Jets | W 24–10 | 4–0 | Louisiana Superdome | Recap |
| 5 | Bye | | | | | |
| 6 | October 18 | New York Giants | W 48–27 | 5–0 | Louisiana Superdome | Recap |
| 7 | October 25 | at Miami Dolphins | W 46–34 | 6–0 | Land Shark Stadium | Recap |
| 8 | November 2 | Atlanta Falcons | W 35–27 | 7–0 | Louisiana Superdome | Recap |
| 9 | November 8 | Carolina Panthers | W 30–20 | 8–0 | Louisiana Superdome | Recap |
| 10 | November 15 | at St. Louis Rams | W 28–23 | 9–0 | Edward Jones Dome | Recap |
| 11 | November 22 | at Tampa Bay Buccaneers | W 38–7 | 10–0 | Raymond James Stadium | Recap |
| 12 | November 30 | New England Patriots | W 38–17 | 11–0 | Louisiana Superdome | Recap |
| 13 | December 6 | at Washington Redskins | W 33–30 (OT) | 12–0 | FedExField | Recap |
| 14 | December 13 | at Atlanta Falcons | W 26–23 | 13–0 | Georgia Dome | Recap |
| 15 | December 19 | Dallas Cowboys | L 17–24 | 13–1 | Louisiana Superdome | Recap |
| 16 | December 27 | Tampa Bay Buccaneers | L 17–20 (OT) | 13–2 | Louisiana Superdome | Recap |
| 17 | January 3 | at Carolina Panthers | L 10–23 | 13–3 | Bank of America Stadium | Recap |

=== Standings ===
NFC South
| | W | L | T | PCT | DIV | CONF | PF | PA | STK |
|---|---|---|---|---|---|---|---|---|---|
| ^{(1)} New Orleans Saints | 13 | 3 | 0 | .813 | 4–2 | 9–3 | 510 | 341 | L3 |
| Atlanta Falcons | 9 | 7 | 0 | .563 | 3–3 | 6–6 | 363 | 325 | W3 |
| Carolina Panthers | 8 | 8 | 0 | .500 | 4–2 | 8–4 | 315 | 308 | W3 |
| Tampa Bay Buccaneers | 3 | 13 | 0 | .188 | 1–5 | 3–9 | 244 | 400 | L1 |

=== Game summaries ===
==== Week 1: vs. Detroit Lions ====
Game summary

| Quarter | 1 | 2 | 3 | 4 | Total |
|---|---|---|---|---|---|
| Lions | 3 | 7 | 17 | 0 | 27 |
| Saints | 14 | 14 | 10 | 7 | 45 |

at Louisiana Superdome, New Orleans

- Game time: 12:03 p.m. CDT
- Game weather: Played indoors, (domed stadium)
- Game attendance: 69,719
- Referee: Mike Carey (94)
- TV announcers (Fox): Chris Myers (play-by-play), Trent Green (color commentator), Jennifer Hammond (sideline reporter)
- Recap, Game Book

Game information

First quarter

- NO – Marques Colston 9-yard pass from Drew Brees (John Carney kick), 12:11. Saints 7–0. Drive: 5 plays, 54 yards, 2:49.
- NO – Robert Meachem 39-yard pass from Drew Brees (John Carney kick), 9:34. Saints 14–0. Drive: 3 plays, 53 yards, 1:09.
- DET – Jason Hanson 47-yard field goal, 5:12. Saints 14–3. Drive: 9 plays, 51 yards, 4:22.

Second quarter

- DET – Kevin Smith 4-yard run (Jason Hanson kick), 14:06. Saints 14–10. Drive: 4 plays, 13 yards, 2:05.
- NO – Jeremy Shockey 1-yard pass from Drew Brees (John Carney kick), 3:45. Saints 21–10. Drive: 10 plays, 65 yards, 5:04.
- NO – Jeremy Shockey 15-yard pass from Drew Brees (John Carney kick), 1:10. Saints 28–10. Drive: 4 plays, 59 yards, 1:11.

Third quarter

- DET – Matthew Stafford 1-yard run (Jason Hanson kick), 11:47. Saints 28–17. Drive: 8 plays, 71 yards, 3:13.
- NO – John Carney 39-yard field goal, 6:11. Saints 31–17. Drive: 10 plays, 64 yards, 5:36.
- DET – Jason Hanson 24-yard field goal, 3:22. Saints 31–20. Drive: 6 plays, 6 yards, 2:49.
- NO – Devery Henderson 58-yard pass from Drew Brees (John Carney kick), 3:03. Saints 38–20. Drive: 1 plays, 58 yards, 0:19.
- DET – Louis Delmas 65-yard fumble return (Jason Hanson kick), 1:29. Saints 38–27.

Fourth quarter

- NO – Heath Evans 13-yard pass from Drew Brees (John Carney kick), 8:29. Saints 45–27. Drive: 13 plays, 78 yards, 8:00.

Top passers

- DET – Matthew Stafford – 16/37, 205 yards, 3 INTs
- NO – Drew Brees – 26/34, 358 yards, 6 TDs, 1 INT

Top rushers

- DET – Kevin Smith – 15 rushes, 20 yards, 1 TD
- NO – Mike Bell – 28 rushes, 143 yards

Top receivers

- DET – Kevin Smith – 7 rec, 52 yds
- NO – Devery Henderson – 5 rec, 103 yds, 1 TD
  Reggie Bush – 5 rec, 55 yds

The Saints began their season with a Week 1 duel against the Detroit Lions. New Orleans got off to a fast start in the first quarter as quarterback Drew Brees completed a 9-yard touchdown pass to wide receiver Marques Colston and a 39-yard touchdown pass to wide receiver Robert Meachem. The Lions answered with kicker Jason Hanson kicking a 47-yard field goal. In the second quarter, Detroit came closer as running back Kevin Smith scored on a 4-yard touchdown run. The Saints replied with Brees completing 1-yard and a 15-yard touchdown passes to tight end Jeremy Shockey.

The Lions tried to catch up in the third quarter as quarterback Matthew Stafford got a 1-yard touchdown run, yet New Orleans answered with kicker John Carney making a 39-yard field goal. Detroit responded respond with Hanson nailing a 24-yard field goal, while the Saints kept pounding away as Brees completed a 58-yard touchdown pass to wide receiver Devery Henderson. The Lions closed out the period with safety Louis Delmas returning a fumble 65 yards for a touchdown. In the fourth quarter, New Orleans closed out the game as Brees completed a 13-yard touchdown pass to fullback Heath Evans.

With the win, not only did the Saints begin their season at 1–0, but Brees (26-of-34, 358 yards, 6 touchdowns, 1 interception) became the first quarterback to throw 6 touchdown passes in an opening day game, as well as tying Billy Kilmer's franchise record for touchdown passes in a game.

==== Week 2: at Philadelphia Eagles ====
Game summary

| Quarter | 1 | 2 | 3 | 4 | Total |
|---|---|---|---|---|---|
| Saints | 10 | 7 | 17 | 14 | 48 |
| Eagles | 7 | 6 | 7 | 2 | 22 |

at Lincoln Financial Field, Philadelphia

- Game time: 1:04 p.m. EDT/12:04 p.m. CDT
- Game weather: 68 °F (20 °C), (sunny)
- Game attendance: 69,144
- Referee: Alberto Riveron (57)
- TV announcers (Fox): Joe Buck (play-by-play), Troy Aikman (color commentator), Pam Oliver (sideline reporter)
- Recap Recap

Game information

First quarter

- NO – Marques Colston 15-yard pass from Drew Brees (John Carney kick), 10:54. Saints 7–0. Drive: 8 plays, 74 yards, 4:06.
- PHI – DeSean Jackson 71-yard pass from Kevin Kolb (David Akers kick), 9:03. Tied 7–7. Drive: 4 plays, 85 yards, 1:51.
- NO – John Carney 23-yard field goal, 1:54. Saints 10–7. Drive: 10 plays, 48 yards, 3:21.

Second quarter

- PHI – David Akers 23-yard field goal, 2:42. Tied 10–10. Drive: 15 plays, 68 yards, 8:20.
- NO – Marques Colston 25-yard pass from Drew Brees (John Carney kick), 0:43. Saints 17–10. Drive: 2 plays, 54 yards, 0:37.
- PHI – David Akers 32-yard field goal, 0:00. Saints 17–13. Drive: 7 plays, 65 yards, 0:43.

Third quarter

- NO – Heath Evans 11-yard pass from Drew Brees (John Carney kick), 13:39. Saints 24–13. Drive: 3 plays, 22 yards, 1:10.
- NO – Mike Bell 7-yard run (John Carney kick), 11:39. Saints 31–13. Drive: 4 plays, 24 yards, 1:19.
- NO – John Carney 25-yard field goal, 4:10. Saints 34–13. Drive: 12 plays, 69 yards, 6:16.
- PHI – Jason Avant 3-yard pass from Kevin Kolb (David Akers kick), 0:29. Saints 34–20. Drive: 8 plays, 35 yards, 3:41.

Fourth quarter

- NO – Reggie Bush 19-yard run (John Carney kick), 9:36. Saints 41–20. Drive: 6 plays, 52 yards, 3:14.
- PHI – Safety, Drew Brees fumbled ball out of end zone, 3:35. Saints 41–22.
- NO – Darren Sharper 97-yard interception return (John Carney kick), 0:55. Saints 48–22.

Top passers

- NO – Drew Brees – 25/34, 311 yards, 3 TDs, 1 INT
- PHI – Kevin Kolb – 31/51, 391 yards, 2 TDs, 3 INTs

Top rushers

- NO – Mike Bell – 17 rushes, 86 yards, 1 TD
- PHI – Brian Westbrook – 13 rushes, 52 yards

Top receivers

- NO – Marques Colston – 8 rec, 98 yds, 2 TDs
- PHI – Brent Celek – 8 rec, 104 yds

Coming off their win over the Lions, the Saints flew to Lincoln Financial Field for a Week 2 duel with the Philadelphia Eagles. In the first quarter, New Orleans drew first blood as quarterback Drew Brees completed a 15-yard touchdown pass to wide receiver Marques Colston. The Eagles answered with quarterback Kevin Kolb (in his first start as the Eagles' quarterback) completing a 71-yard touchdown pass to wide receiver DeSean Jackson, yet the Saints replied with kicker John Carney making a 23-yard field goal. In the second quarter, Philadelphia tied the game as kicker David Akers got a 23-yard field goal. New Orleans answered with Brees completing a 25-yard touchdown pass to Colston. The Eagles closed out the half as Akers made a 32-yard field goal.

In the third quarter, the Saints began to take command as Brees completed an 11-yard touchdown pass to fullback Heath Evans, along with running back Mike Bell getting a 7-yard touchdown run and Carney nailing a 25-yard field goal. The Eagles answered with Kolb completing a 3-yard touchdown pass to wide receiver Jason Avant. In the fourth quarter, New Orleans kept up its domination as running back Reggie Bush got a 19-yard touchdown. Philadelphia drove to the Saints' 5-yard line, but could not score and the drive ended on downs; the Saints were then unable to move the ball and, rather than punting out of their own end zone, opted to have Brees throw the ball out of the end zone for an intentional safety. After the ensuing free kick, the Eagles again drove deep into Saints territory, but again failed to score, as Kolb threw an interception which safety Darren Sharper returned 97 yards for a touchdown.

With the win, the Saints improved to 2–0.

==== Week 3: at Buffalo Bills ====
Game summary

| Quarter | 1 | 2 | 3 | 4 | Total |
|---|---|---|---|---|---|
| Saints | 7 | 3 | 0 | 17 | 27 |
| Bills | 0 | 7 | 0 | 0 | 7 |

at Ralph Wilson Stadium, Orchard Park, New York

- Game time: 4:05 p.m. EDT/3:05 p.m. CDT
- Game weather: 64 °F (18 °C), (cloudy)
- Game attendance: 70,261
- Referee: Walt Anderson (66)
- TV announcers (Fox): Ron Pitts (play-by-play), John Lynch (color commentator)
- Recap Recap

Game information

First quarter

- NO – Lynell Hamilton 1-yard run (John Carney kick), 10:04. Saints 7–0. Drive: 10 plays, 82 yards, 4:56.

Second quarter

- BUF – Ryan Denney 25-yard pass from Brian Moorman (Rian Lindell kick), 14:48. Tied 7–7. Drive: 9 plays, 72 yards, 3:26.
- NO – John Carney 27-yard field goal, 4:17. Saints 10–7. Drive: 5 plays, 23 yards, 1:55.

Third quarter

- No scoring plays

Fourth quarter

- NO – Pierre Thomas 34-yard run (John Carney kick), 9:45. Saints 17–7. Drive: 3 plays, 66 yards, 1:16.
- NO – John Carney 35-yard field goal, 3:21. Saints 20–7. Drive: 9 plays, 49 yards, 4:01.
- NO – Pierre Thomas 19-yard run (John Carney kick), 2:03. Saints 27–7. Drive: 2 plays, 25 yards, 0:12.

Top passers

- NO – Drew Brees – 16/29, 172 yards
- BUF – Trent Edwards – 20/35, 156 yards, 1 INT

Top rushers

- NO – Pierre Thomas – 14 rushes, 126 yards, 2 TDs
- BUF – Fred Jackson – 18 rushes, 71 yards

Top receivers

- NO – Jeremy Shockey – 6 rec, 48 yds
- BUF – Josh Reed – 6 rec, 60 yds

Coming off their win over the Eagles, the Saints flew to Ralph Wilson Stadium for a Week 3 interconference duel with the Buffalo Bills. New Orleans made an immediate impact in the first quarter with running back Lynell Hamilton's 1-yard touchdown run. The Bills answered in the second quarter on a fake field goal attempt; punter Brian Moorman completed a 25-yard touchdown pass to defensive end Ryan Denney. The Saints closed out the half with kicker John Carney's 27-yard field goal. After a scoreless third quarter, New Orleans took control in the fourth quarter with running back Pierre Thomas' 34-yard touchdown run, Carney's 35-yard field goal, and Thomas' 19-yard touchdown run.

With the win, the Saints improved to 3–0.

==== Week 4: vs. New York Jets ====
Game summary

| Quarter | 1 | 2 | 3 | 4 | Total |
|---|---|---|---|---|---|
| Jets | 0 | 3 | 7 | 0 | 10 |
| Saints | 3 | 14 | 0 | 7 | 24 |

at Louisiana Superdome, New Orleans

- Game time: 3:05 pm CDT
- Game weather: Played indoors, (domed stadium)
- Game attendance: 70,009
- Referee: Bill Leavy (127)
- TV announcers (CBS): Greg Gumbel (play-by-play), Dan Dierdorf (color commentator)
- Recap Recap

Game information

First quarter

- NO – John Carney 34-yard field goal, 8:06. Saints 3–0. Drive: 13 plays, 60 yards, 6:54.

Second quarter

- NO – Darren Sharper 99-yard interception return (John Carney kick), 14:45. Saints 10–0.
- NO – Remi Ayodele 0-yard fumble return (John Carney kick), 9:00. Saints 17–0.
- NYJ – Jay Feely 38-yard field goal, 1:48. Saints 17–3. Drive: 14 plays, 60 yards, 7:12.

Third quarter

- NYJ – Thomas Jones 15-yard run (Jay Feely kick), 7:48. Saints 17–10. Drive: 4 plays, 34 yards, 1:16.

Fourth quarter

- NO – Pierre Thomas 1-yard run (John Carney kick), 6:07. Saints 24–10. Drive: 11 plays, 74 yards, 6:49.

Top passers

- NYJ – Mark Sanchez – 14/27, 138 yards, 3 INTs
- NO – Drew Brees – 20/32, 190 yards

Top rushers

- NYJ – Thomas Jones – 13 rushes, 48 yards, 1 TD
- NO – Pierre Thomas – 19 rushes, 86 yards, 1 TD

Top receivers

- NYJ – Jerricho Cotchery – 5 rec, 71 yds
- NO – Pierre Thomas – 4 rec, 46 yds
  Jeremy Shockey – 4 rec, 34 yds

Coming off their road win over the Bills, the Saints went home for a Week 4 interconference duel with the New York Jets. New Orleans delivered the game's first points as kicker John Carney got a 34-yard field goal. In the second quarter, the defense went to work. Safety Darren Sharper returned an interception 99 yards for a touchdown, followed by defensive end Will Smith forcing an endzone fumble by sacking Jets quarterback Mark Sanchez, which allowed defensive tackle Remi Ayodele to land on the ball for a touchdown. Afterwards, New York closed out the half with kicker Jay Feely's 38-yard field goal.

The Jets began a comeback attempt in the third quarter with running back Thomas Jones getting a 15-yard touchdown run. Afterwards, the Saints closed out the game with running back Pierre Thomas' 1-yard touchdown and the defense making an impressive stand.

With the win, New Orleans entered its bye week at 4–0.

==== Week 6: vs. New York Giants ====
Game summary

| Quarter | 1 | 2 | 3 | 4 | Total |
|---|---|---|---|---|---|
| Giants | 3 | 14 | 0 | 10 | 27 |
| Saints | 14 | 20 | 7 | 7 | 48 |

at Louisiana Superdome, New Orleans

- Game time: 12:03 p.m. CDT
- Game weather: Played indoors, (domed stadium)
- Game attendance: 70,011
- Referee: Ed Hochuli (85)
- TV announcers (Fox): Thom Brennaman (play-by-play), Troy Aikman (color commentator), Pam Oliver (sideline reporter)
- Recap Recap

Game information

First quarter

- NO – Mike Bell 2-yard run (John Carney kick), 7:19. Saints 7–0. Drive: 15 plays, 70 yards, 7:41.
- NO – Jeremy Shockey 1-yard pass from Drew Brees (John Carney kick), 2:11. Saints 14–0. Drive: 6 plays, 80 yards, 2:28.
- NYG – Lawrence Tynes 49-yard field goal, 0:03. Saints 14–3. Drive: 6 plays, 19 yards, 2:08.

Second quarter

- NO – Robert Meachem 36-yard pass from Drew Brees (kick failed), 12:40. Saints 20–3. Drive: 4 plays, 57 yards, 2:23.
- NYG – Ahmad Bradshaw 10-yard run (Lawrence Tynes kick), 7:41. Saints 20–10. Drive: 9 plays, 73 yards, 4:59.
- NO – Lance Moore 12-yard pass from Drew Brees (John Carney kick), 5:04. Saints 27–10. Drive: 5 plays, 61 yards, 2:33.
- NYG – Mario Manningham 15-yard pass from Eli Manning (Lawrence Tynes kick), 3:19. Saints 27–17. Drive: 4 plays, 37 yards, 1:45.
- NO – Reggie Bush 7-yard run (John Carney kick), 0:09. Saints 34–17. Drive: 2 plays, 7 yards, 0:09.

Third quarter

- NO – Marques Colston 12-yard pass from Drew Brees (John Carney kick), 4:10. Saints 41–17. Drive: 9 plays, 71 yards, 5:11.

Fourth quarter

- NYG – Lawrence Tynes 38-yard field goal, 12:09. Saints 41–20. Drive: 11 plays, 60 yards, 2:43.
- NO – Heath Evans 2-yard run (John Carney kick), 7:04. Saints 48–20. Drive: 8 plays, 80 yards, 5:05.
- NYG – Hakeem Nicks 37-yard pass from David Carr (Lawrence Tynes kick), 3:15. Saints 48–27. Drive: 3 plays, 50 yards, 1:00.

Top passers

- NYG – Eli Manning – 14/31, 178 yards, 1 TD, 1 INT
- NO – Drew Brees – 23/30, 369 yards, 4 TDs

Top rushers

- NYG – Ahmad Bradshaw – 10 rushes, 48 yards, 1 TD
- NO – Pierre Thomas – 15 rushes, 72 yards

Top receivers

- NYG – Hakeem Nicks – 5 rec, 114 yds, 1 TD
- NO – Marques Colston – 8 rec, 166 yds, 1 TD

"Saints keep Giants off balance: The Saints completely dismantled the Giants by showcasing a versatile passing game out of multiple formations and personnel groupings. New Orleans' ability to routinely switch from conventional two-back sets to three- and four-receiver formations kept New York off balanced. It also enabled Drew Brees to attack a defense that was sitting back in conventional coverage. With the Giants playing a heavy amount of two-deep zone, Brees repeatedly attacked the middle of the field with seams and deep crosses. The Giants' underneath defenders were unable to disrupt the timing or release of the receivers' routes, which allowed Brees to routinely find an open target in the zone. Brees capitalized on the Giants' tactical error, and the Saints topped the 40-point mark for the third time this season as a result."

— Bucky Brookssource

Coming off their bye week, the Saints stayed at home for a huge Week 6 game in a "Battle of The Unbeatens" against the New York Giants. New Orleans' offense roared out of the gates in the first quarter with running back Mike Bell's 2-yard touchdown run on a 4th-down-conversion and quarterback Drew Brees' 1-yard touchdown pass to former Giants tight end Jeremy Shockey. New York closed out the opening quarter with a 49-yard field goal from kicker Lawrence Tynes, with the Saints leading 14–3. The Saints' high-powered offense continued to heat up in the second quarter as Brees completed a 36-yard touchdown pass to wide receiver Robert Meachem, being called a "Week 6 Can't-Miss Play." The Giants tried to keep up as running back Ahmad Bradshaw got a 10-yard touchdown run, yet New Orleans answered with Brees hooking up with wide receiver Lance Moore on a 12-yard touchdown pass. New York tried to catch up, yet continued to stay persistent as quarterback Eli Manning completed a 15-yard touchdown pass to wide receiver Mario Manningham, yet the Saints closed out the half with a 7-yard touchdown run from running back Reggie Bush. The Saints now led 34–17, with the point deficit being at 17 points. The Saints had over 300 yards of total offense, with 5 offensive touchdowns and 2 TD runs by Mike Bell and Reggie Bush, and 3 TD passes from Drew Brees to Jeremy Shockey, Robert Meachem and Lance Moore.

New Orleans solidified its lead in the third quarter with Brees finding wide receiver Marques Colston on a 12-yard touchdown pass. The Giants opened the fourth quarter with Tynes booting a 38-yard field goal, yet the Saints ended its dominating run with fullback Heath Evans getting a 2-yard touchdown run. New York then closed out the game's scoring with quarterback David Carr completing a 37-yard touchdown pass to wide receiver Hakeem Nicks.

The New Orleans Saints finished the game with 493 yards of total offense (369 passing and 124 rushing), 7 offensive touchdowns (3 runs and 4 pass), 48 points, 28 first-downs, finished 7/13 (53%) in 3rd-down-conversions and 1/2 (50%) in 4th-down conversions, ran 70 plays (30 pass plays and 40 rushing plays), controlled the ball 36:07 minutes and did not commit a turnover, though Robert Meachem fumbled, with the fumble being recovered by the Saints. According to NFL Game Center, some of the team leaders for the Saints included Drew Brees, who missed only 7 passes, passed for 369 yards, scored 4 touchdowns and spread them to 4 different receivers, and threw 0 interceptions, did not fumble and did not get sacked. For the receiving game, Marques Colston caught 8 receptions for 166 yards with 1 touchdown coming from 12 yards out from Drew Brees in the 3rd quarter, and Lance Moore caught 6 receptions for 78 yards with 1 touchdown, being from 12 yards out from Drew Brees. For the running game, Pierre Thomas ran 15 times for 72 yards with 0 touchdowns, and Mike Bell ran 15 times for 34 yards, with 1 touchdown, being a 2-yard touchdown run early in the 1st quarter on the Saints' first possession on 4th-down. The Giants lost the game by a 21-point deficit and finished it with only 325 yards of total offense (241 passing and 84 rushing), 3 offensive touchdowns (2 pass and 1 run), 27 points, 17 first-downs, finished 3/10 (30%) in 3rd-down-efficiency and 1/1 in 4th-down-efficiency, ran only 57 plays (36 pass plays and 19 rushing plays), controlled the ball for 23:53 minutes on the clock and committed 2 turnovers (1 interception and 1 fumble). Their team leaders included Eli Manning, who completed 14 passes out of 31 attempts, passed for 178 yards, ran the ball 1 time for a loss 1 yard, threw an interception and fumbled on a sack, while David Carr finished 4/5 for 72 yards and 1 touchdown, a 37-yarder to Hakeem Nicks. For the receiving game, Hakeem Nicks caught 5 receptions for 114 yards, with 1 touchdown reception coming from quarterback David Carr, while Mario Manningham caught 4 receptions for 50 yards, with 1 touchdown from Eli Manning. For the running game, Ahmad Bradshaw had 10 carries for 48 yards for a 4.8 average with 1 touchdown, and Brandon Jacobs had 7 carries for 33 yards for a 4.7 average, with 0 touchdowns.

With the win, New Orleans improved to 5–0.

==== Week 7: at Miami Dolphins ====
Game summary

| Quarter | 1 | 2 | 3 | 4 | Total |
|---|---|---|---|---|---|
| Saints | 3 | 7 | 14 | 22 | 46 |
| Dolphins | 14 | 10 | 10 | 0 | 34 |

at Land Shark Stadium, Miami Gardens, Florida

- Game time: 4:15 p.m. EDT/3:15 p.m. CDT
- Game weather: 89 °F (32 °C), (sunny)
- Game attendance: 66,689
- Referee: John Parry (132)
- TV announcers (Fox): Dick Stockton (play-by-play), Charles Davis (color commentator), Jaime Maggio (sideline reporter)
- Recap Recap

Game information

First quarter

- MIA – Ricky Williams 4-yard run (Dan Carpenter kick), 7:20. Dolphins 7–0. Drive: 1 play, 4 yards, 0:05.
- NO – John Carney 46-yard field goal, 5:06. Dolphins 7–3. Drive: 4 plays, –7 yards, 2:14.
- MIA – Ricky Williams 68-yard run (Dan Carpenter kick), 4:47. Dolphins 14–3. Drive: 1 play, 63 yards, 0:19.

Second quarter

- MIA – Dan Carpenter 32-yard field goal, 11:21. Dolphins 17–3. Drive: 12 plays, 46 yards, 7:24.
- MIA – Ronnie Brown 8-yard run (Dan Carpenter kick), 8:55. Dolphins 24–3. Drive: 4 plays, 19 yards, 2:05.
- NO – Drew Brees 1-yard run (John Carney kick), 0:02. Dolphins 24–10. Drive: 8 plays, 51 yards, 1:36.

Third quarter

- NO – Darren Sharper 42-yard interception return (John Carney kick), 13:56. Dolphins 24–17.
- MIA – Dan Carpenter 33-yard field goal, 5:59. Dolphins 27–17. Drive: 4 plays, 0 yards, 1:18.
- NO – Marques Colston 10-yard pass from Drew Brees (John Carney kick), 1:09. Dolphins 27–24. Drive: 8 plays, 82 yards, 4:50.
- MIA – Ricky Williams 4-yard run (Dan Carpenter kick), 0:03. Dolphins 34–24. Drive: 3 plays, 71 yards, 1:06.

Fourth quarter

- NO – Reggie Bush 10-yard run (John Carney kick), 13:23. Dolphins 34–31. Drive: 3 plays, 79 yards, 1:40.
- NO – Drew Brees 2-yard run (kick failed), 8:35. Saints 37–34. Drive: 8 plays, 60 yards, 4:17.
- NO – John Carney 20-yard field goal, 3:23. Saints 40–34. Drive: 10 plays, 64 yards, 4:38.
- NO – Tracy Porter 54-yard interception return (run failed), 1:53. Saints 46–34.

Top passers

- NO – Drew Brees – 22/38, 298 yards, 1 TD, 3 INTs
- MIA – Chad Henne – 18/36, 211 yards, 2 INTs

Top rushers

- NO – Mike Bell – 12 rushes, 80 yards
- MIA – Ricky Williams – 9 rushes, 80 yards, 3 TDs

Top receivers

- NO – Marques Colston – 5 rec, 72 yds, 1 TD
- MIA – Greg Camarillo – 5 rec, 55 yds

In Week 7, the Saints traveled to Miami to continue their interconference series against the Dolphins. Miami jumped out to a 24–3 lead by the second quarter, with former Saints first-rounder and Heisman winner Ricky Williams scoring on runs of 4 and 68 yards, and Ronnie Brown added a touchdown run of 8 yards in the second quarter. Despite being behind for the first time in the season, the Saints gained momentum when Drew Brees scored on a quarterback sneak to end the first half and cap a 1:36 drive of 51 yards.

In the second half, the Saints scored on a 42-yard interception return by Darren Sharper in the third, but Dan Carpenter added a second field goal to push the lead back to ten points. The Saints responded with a 10-yard Brees-Colston connection, but Ricky Williams answered with another 4-yard rushing score to make the score 34–24. The Saints completed their comeback in the fourth quarter, first with Reggie Bush scoring on a reverse from 10 yards out, then with Brees scoring his second rushing touchdown from 2. Though John Carney missed the extra point, he later hit a field goal from 20 yards, and Tracy Porter sealed the comeback with a 54-yard interception return. The Saints outscored Miami 22–0 in the fourth quarter, and 36–10 for the second half.

The Saints improved to 6–0 with the win.

==== Week 8: vs. Atlanta Falcons ====
Game summary

| Quarter | 1 | 2 | 3 | 4 | Total |
|---|---|---|---|---|---|
| Falcons | 14 | 0 | 7 | 6 | 27 |
| Saints | 7 | 21 | 0 | 7 | 35 |

at Louisiana Superdome, New Orleans

- Game time: 8:30 pm EST
- Game weather: None (Domed Stadium)
- Game attendance: 70,088
- Referee: Jeff Triplette (42)
- TV announcers (ESPN): Mike Tirico, Ron Jaworski & Jon Gruden

Coming off their comeback road win over the Dolphins, the Saints went home for a Week 8 NFC South duel with the Atlanta Falcons on Monday night. New Orleans would initially trail in the first quarter as Falcons running back Michael Turner got a 13-yard touchdown run, yet the Saints answered with running back Pierre Thomas getting a 22-yard touchdown run. Atlanta would come right back as quarterback Drew Brees was sacked by free safety Thomas DeCoud, causing him to fumble and allow defensive end Kroy Biermann to return the ball 4 yards for a touchdown. In the second quarter, New Orleans would go on a rampage with Brees' 18-yard touchdown pass to wide receiver Marques Colston, running back Reggie Bush's 1-yard touchdown run, and cornerback Jabari Greer's 48-yard interception return for a touchdown.

However, the Falcons began to get back into the game with quarterback Matt Ryan finding wide receiver Roddy White on a 68-yard touchdown pass in the third quarter, followed by kicker Jason Elam booting a 25-yard field goal. Fortunately, cornerback Tracy Porter's key interception (helped from linebacker Jonathan Vilma's tip) lead to Brees finding Thomas on a 1-yard touchdown pass. Even though Atlanta crept closer with Elam nailing a 40-yard field goal and recovering an onside kick, free safety Darren Sharper's interception sealed the tight victory.

With the win, the Saints improved to 7–0 (tying their best start since 1991).

==== Week 9: vs. Carolina Panthers ====
Game summary

| Quarter | 1 | 2 | 3 | 4 | Total |
|---|---|---|---|---|---|
| Panthers | 14 | 3 | 3 | 0 | 20 |
| Saints | 0 | 6 | 14 | 10 | 30 |

at Louisiana Superdome, New Orleans

- Game time: 4:05 pm EST
- Game weather: None (Domed Stadium)
- Game attendance: 70,011
- Referee: Scott Green (19)
- TV announcers (Fox): Thom Brennaman & Brian Billick

Coming off their Monday night win over the Falcons, the Saints stayed at home for a Week 9 NFC South duel with the Carolina Panthers. New Orleans would trail in the first quarter as Panthers running back DeAngelo Williams got a 66-yard and a 7-yard touchdown run. In the second quarter, the Saints got on the board with a 23-yard field goal from kicker John Carney. Carolina would reply with kicker John Kasay getting a 32-yard field goal, yet New Orleans would close out the half with Carney's 25-yard field goal.

In the third quarter, the Saints crept closer with a 10-yard touchdown by running back Pierre Thomas. The Panthers would reply with Kasay nailing a 25-yard field goal, yet New Orleans would close out the period with quarterback Drew Brees' 54-yard touchdown pass to wide receiver Robert Meachem. Afterwards, the Saints took command in the fourth quarter as Carney booted a 40-yard field goal, followed by defensive tackle Anthony Hargrove forcing Williams into a fumble and recovering it for a 1-yard touchdown run.

With the win, the Saints improved to 8–0, which is the team's best start in franchise history.

==== Week 10: at St. Louis Rams ====
Game summary

| Quarter | 1 | 2 | 3 | 4 | Total |
|---|---|---|---|---|---|
| Saints | 0 | 14 | 7 | 7 | 28 |
| Rams | 0 | 14 | 3 | 6 | 23 |

at Edward Jones Dome, St. Louis, Missouri

- Game time: 1:00 pm EST
- Game weather: None (Domed Stadium)
- Game attendance: 59,858
- Referee: Gene Steratore (112)
- TV announcers (Fox): Chris Rose, Trent Green & Rob Desir

Coming off their divisional home win over the Panthers, the Saints flew to the Edward Jones Dome for a Week 10 duel with the St. Louis Rams. After a scoreless first quarter, New Orleans got the game's inaugural points in the second quarter with running back Reggie Bush getting a 3-yard touchdown run. The Rams would respond with quarterback Marc Bulger completing a 29-yard touchdown pass to wide receiver Donnie Avery. New Orleans would answer with quarterback Drew Brees hooking up with Bush on a 15-yard touchdown pass, yet St. Louis would close out the half with a 2-yard touchdown run from running back Steven Jackson.

The Saints would begin the third quarter with wide receiver Courtney Roby returning the second half's opening kickoff 97 yards for a touchdown. The Rams would stay close with kicker Josh Brown nailing a 32-yard field goal. New Orleans would extend their lead in the fourth quarter Brees finding wide receiver Robert Meachem on a 27-yard touchdown pass. St. Louis tried to catch up as Bulger found Avery again on a 19-yard touchdown pass (with a failed 2-point conversion), yet the defense prevented the Rams from getting any closer.

With the win, the Saints improved to 9–0.

==== Week 11: at Tampa Bay Buccaneers ====
Game summary

| Quarter | 1 | 2 | 3 | 4 | Total |
|---|---|---|---|---|---|
| Saints | 7 | 10 | 14 | 7 | 38 |
| Buccaneers | 7 | 0 | 0 | 0 | 7 |

at Raymond James Stadium, Tampa, Florida

- Game time: 1:00 pm EST
- Game weather: 79 °F (26 °C) (Cloudy)
- Game attendance: 62,720
- Referee: Walt Coleman (65)
- TV announcers (Fox): Sam Rosen & Tim Ryan

Coming off a tough road win against the Rams, the Saints went to Raymond James Stadium for a Week 11 duel against the Tampa Bay Buccaneers. After a quick first quarter Tampa Bay touchdown from rookie quarterback Josh Freeman to Micheal Clayton to cap a 95-yard drive, the Bucs showed how the Saints struggled defensively. The Bucs looked to improve on their next drive by moving the ball with running backs Carnell Williams and Ernest Graham. The Saints would answer defensively as they took advantage of numerous mistakes by rookie Tampa Bay quarterback Josh Freeman.

Drew Brees passed for 187 yards and three touchdowns. He connected with Robert Meacham for a 4-yard touchdown catch and a 6-yard touchdown catch, and to tight end David Thomas for an 11-yard touchdown. Pressure on the young Freeman from the Saints forced him to throw 3-interceptions and a fumble, allowing the Saints to take more control during the second half. The Saints would close out the game with two scores from running back Mike Bell from 3 yards and one yard out.

With the win, the Saints improved to 10–0.

==== Week 12: vs. New England Patriots ====
Game summary

| Quarter | 1 | 2 | 3 | 4 | Total |
|---|---|---|---|---|---|
| Patriots | 7 | 3 | 7 | 0 | 17 |
| Saints | 3 | 21 | 7 | 7 | 38 |

at Louisiana Superdome, New Orleans

- Game time: 8:30 pm EST
- Game weather: None (Domed Stadium)
- Game attendance: 70,768
- Referee: Pete Morelli (135)
- TV announcers (ESPN): Mike Tirico, Ron Jaworski, Jon Gruden & Suzy Kolber

The Saints returned to the Dome for possibly the most hyped game in recent team history, a Monday Night showdown in front of 70,768 with the 7–3 Patriots, winners of 3 Super Bowls in this decade. The Saints came out firing from the start with a 33-yard completion from Brees to Devery Henderson. The drive resulted in a John Carney field goal from 30 yards. The Patriots stormed back on the next drive, converting twice on 4th-and-1, the second being Laurence Maroney's 4-yard touchdown run to put New England in the lead. On New England's next drive, Tom Brady was intercepted by a healthy and re-signed Mike McKenzie, leading to a touchdown from Brees to Pierre Thomas on an 18-yard swing pass. Forcing the Patriots to punt again, Drew Brees found a wide-open Henderson on the next play, who waltzed into the endzone on a 75-yard reception to make it 17–7. The Patriots scored again on a 38-yard field goal by Stephen Gostkowski. Drew Brees made it 24–10 on a 38 yarder to Robert Meachem, which was set up by a 25-yard catch by former Patriots tight end David Thomas, and Gostkowski missed a 50-yard field goal wide to close out the half.

On the Pats first play of the third quarter, Scott Fujita forced Maroney to fumble, and Sedrick Ellis recovered the ball. However, Maroney forced Ellis to fumble, and Wes Welker recovered the ball on the New England 19. Brady then drove New England downfield, including a 47 yarder to Randy Moss, and Maroney scored his second rushing touchdown from two yards. On the next offensive play, Marques Colston turns a 10-yard catch into a 68-yard gain to the Patriots 6, and New Orleans gets another touchdown via a two-yard catch by backup tight end Darnell Dinkins. In the fourth quarter, Brees hits Colston from 20 yards for his 5th passing touchdown of the game, and the game was sealed when Sharper got his 8th interception of the year, and Brady was pulled with 5:28 to go, replaced by backup Brian Hoyer.

With the win, the Saints improve to 11–0. Drew Brees completed 18 of 23 passes for a season-high 371 yards, five touchdowns and his first-ever perfect passer rating of 158.3, and became the first to throw 5 touchdowns against a Bill Belichick-coached team.

The television broadcast of the game on ESPN's Monday Night Football was the second-most-watched cable telecast of all time.

The Saints were able to sweep the AFC East with the victory.

==== Week 13: at Washington Redskins ====
Game summary

| Quarter | 1 | 2 | 3 | 4 | OT | Total |
|---|---|---|---|---|---|---|
| Saints | 0 | 17 | 3 | 10 | 3 | 33 |
| Redskins | 10 | 7 | 10 | 3 | 0 | 30 |

at FedExField, Landover, Maryland

- Game time: 1:00 pm EST
- Game weather: 36 °F (2 °C) (Sunny)
- Game attendance: 84,520
- Referee: Carl Cheffers (51)
- TV announcers (Fox): Sam Rosen, Tim Ryan & Nischelle Turner

After an emotional Monday night win against the New England Patriots, the Saints traveled to FedExField in Landover, Maryland for a Week 13 matchup against the Washington Redskins. In the 1st quarter, the Redskins scored first with Jason Campbell throwing an 8-yard touchdown to Fred Davis. Shaun Suisham then kicked a 32-yard field goal to go up 10–0. In the 2nd quarter, the Saints finally scored with a Garrett Hartley 34-yard field goal. After a defensive stance, Drew Brees threw a 40-yard touchdown to Marques Colston which tied the game 10–10. The Redskins retook the lead with Jason Campbell connecting with Devin Thomas for a 10-yard touchdown. With the Saints now down 17–10, Brees and the Saints attempted to drive the field. Brees’ pass attempt to Jeremy Shockey was intercepted by Kareem Moore. Robert Meachem then ran into Moore, stripped the football, and returned it for a 44-yard touchdown.

In the 3rd quarter, the Redskins kicker Suisham made a 28-yard field goal. The Redskins then extended their lead with Devin Thomas catching a 13-yard touchdown pass from Campbell. The Saints’ Hartley made a 27-yard field goal. In the 4th quarter, Shaun Suisham and Garrett Hartley traded field goals. After a field goal miss from 23 yards by Shaun Suisham, the Saints, only down by 7 points, now had the opportunity to tie the game. Drew Brees and the Saints offense drove the field in 5 plays, in 33 seconds and capped the drive with a 53-yard touchdown pass to Robert Meachem to tie the game 30–30 at the end of regulation. The Saints completed the comeback with Garrett Hartley's 18-yard field goal for the first lead in the game and the win 33–30 in overtime.

With the win, the Saints improved to 12–0 and clinched the NFC South title. Their 12 wins also tied a single-season franchise record set in the 1987 and 1992 seasons.

==== Week 14: at Atlanta Falcons ====
Game summary

| Quarter | 1 | 2 | 3 | 4 | Total |
|---|---|---|---|---|---|
| Saints | 3 | 13 | 7 | 3 | 26 |
| Falcons | 6 | 3 | 7 | 7 | 23 |

at Georgia Dome, Atlanta

- Game time: 1:00 pm EST
- Game weather: None (Domed Stadium)
- Game attendance: 68,930
- Referee: Tony Corrente (99)
- TV announcers (Fox): Joe Buck, Troy Aikman & Pam Oliver

After a tough road win in overtime against the Redskins. The Saints marched into Atlanta with their eyes on a franchise best 13th straight victory. In the first quarter, Atlanta started out fast driving down the field for a Matt Bryant 36-yard field goal. The Saints responded with a Garrett Hartley 33-yard field goal. Atlanta responded with another Matt Bryant 30-yard field goal to take 6–3 lead at the end of the first quarter. The Saints would come out strong in the second quarter, when RB Reggie Bush scored on a 6-yard pass from Drew Brees to take a 10–6 lead. The Saints continued to move the ball and added onto the lead with a Marques Colston 3-yard touchdown catch from Drew Brees. Garrett Hartley kick failed giving the Saints a 16–6 lead in the second quarter. The Falcons troubles would continue. After failing to score a touchdown for the third time in the first half, Atlanta settled for a Matt Bryant 27-yard field goal to get within a touchdown at halftime.

The second half looked promising for the Saints but RB Reggie Bush fumbled and recovered the ball. RB Reggie Bush would redeem his performance on the next play with a 21-yard screen pass from Drew Brees to put the Saint up 23–9. Atlanta would make a run and wear down the Saints defense when Michael Jenkins caught a 50-yard touchdown pass from Chris Redman to move within a touchdown. Jason Snelling would add a 4-yard touchdown run to tie the game at 23. Late in the fourth quarter, the Saints would have a chance to get the lead back with a Garrett Hartley 38-yard field goal. The Saints got a break when Jonathan Vilma intercepted a Chris Redman pass to give the Saints a chance to increase the lead. The Saints would move the ball but only settle for a fake field goal that failed. The results continued in doubt for the Saints until Vilma came up with another defensive fourth-down hit on RB Jason Snelling. Stopping him a yard short of the marker with just over a minute remaining, the Saints' defense came up big but gave up 392 yards. Drew Brees threw for 296 yards for the season and threw for more than 30,000 yards in his career. He also added three touchdowns for the season and tied a club record with 120 in his Saints career. Running back Reggie Bush had 47 rushing yards, 33 receiving yards and two touchdowns added for the season.

The Saints won 26–23. With the win, they improved to 13–0, clinching a first-round bye in the playoffs.

==== Week 15: vs. Dallas Cowboys ====
Game summary

| Quarter | 1 | 2 | 3 | 4 | Total |
|---|---|---|---|---|---|
| Cowboys | 14 | 3 | 7 | 0 | 24 |
| Saints | 0 | 3 | 0 | 14 | 17 |

at Louisiana Superdome, New Orleans

- Game time: 8:20 pm EST
- Game weather: None (Domed Stadium)
- Game attendance: 70,213
- Referee: Terry McAulay (77)
- TV announcers (NFL Network): Bob Papa & Matt Millen

Coming off yet another close win, this time over the Falcons, the Saints went home for a Week 15 Saturday night duel with the Dallas Cowboys. In the first quarter, Dallas would get off to a fast start with quarterback Tony Romo completing a 49-yard touchdown pass to wide receiver Miles Austin. The Cowboys then increased their lead later in the quarter with a 3-yard touchdown run by running back Marion Barber. In the second quarter, the Saints would score their only points of the half with kicker Garrett Hartley nailing a 34-yard field goal. However, the Cowboys took a 17–3 lead at halftime with kicker Nick Folk's 44-yard field goal.

In the third quarter, Dallas scored the period's only points when running back Marion Barber got a 2-yard touchdown run. An exciting fourth quarter ensued. New Orleans got the first score of the period when running back Mike Bell scored from one yard out to make a 24–10 Dallas lead. Following a Dallas three-and-out, New Orleans made it a one touchdown game when quarterback Drew Brees hit wide receiver Lance Moore for a 7-yard touchdown pass. Dallas then marched down the field to the Saints' eight-yard line, but then kicker Nick Folk's potential game-icing 24-yard field goal hit the right goalpost and went no good, setting up another fourth quarter comeback for the Saints. However, unlike previous close games against Washington and Atlanta, quarterback Drew Brees was sacked with 10 seconds left in the contest at the Dallas 48-yard line, forcing a fumble for the second time in the game by Dallas' DeMarcus Ware, which was then recovered by nose tackle Jay Ratliff. The Cowboys then took a knee to end the game.

With the loss, the Saints fell to 13–1, ending their chance at a perfect season. Also with the Colts' win, the Saints held the 2nd best overall record of any team.

==== Week 16: vs. Tampa Bay Buccaneers ====
Game summary

| Quarter | 1 | 2 | 3 | 4 | OT | Total |
|---|---|---|---|---|---|---|
| Buccaneers | 0 | 3 | 0 | 14 | 3 | 20 |
| Saints | 14 | 3 | 0 | 0 | 0 | 17 |

at Louisiana Superdome, New Orleans

- Game time: 1:00 pm EST
- Game weather: None (Domed Stadium)
- Game attendance: 70,021
- Referee: Jerome Boger (23)
- TV announcers (Fox): Kenny Albert, Daryl Johnston & Tony Siragusa

The Saints dominated the first quarter and entered halftime riding on a 17–3 lead. Tampa Bay scored two touchdowns in the fourth quarter, including a 77-yard kick return by Micheal Spurlock, to tie the game at 17. As time expired, Garrett Hartley attempted a 37-yard field goal that would have salvaged the game for the Saints, but the kick hooked left. In overtime, Tampa Bay won the coin toss, received the kickoff, and drove down the field to win the game with a field goal, for a final score of 20–17.

With the loss, the Saints fell to 13–2 and appeared to be at risk of losing home-field advantage in the playoffs to the Vikings. However, the Vikings lost in overtime to the Chicago Bears in Week 16's Monday night game, and the Saints clinched home-field advantage with the top seed in the NFC.

==== Week 17: at Carolina Panthers ====
Game summary

| Quarter | 1 | 2 | 3 | 4 | Total |
|---|---|---|---|---|---|
| Saints | 0 | 3 | 7 | 0 | 10 |
| Panthers | 7 | 10 | 6 | 0 | 23 |

at Bank of America Stadium, Charlotte, North Carolina

- Game time: 1:00 pm EST
- Game weather: 28 °F (−2 °C) (Partly Cloudy)
- Game attendance: 73,047
- Referee: Alberto Riveron (57)
- TV announcers (Fox): Thom Brennaman & Brian Billick

After barely losing to the now 3–12 Tampa Bay Buccaneers, the New Orleans Saints looked to rest their starters for the remaining game against the Carolina Panthers. In the first quarter, the Carolina Panthers started out with great runs from Jonathan Stewart who capped off the first drive with a 67-yard run for a touchdown. In the second quarter the Saints got on the board with a Garrett Hartley 35-yard field goal making the score 7–3. Carolina was not done, they continued to go to their play makers like Dwayne Jarrett who caught a 30-yard pass from Matt Moore to go up 14–3. Later John Kasay added a 41-yard field goal to extend the lead to 17–3. In the second half, the Saints could not stop Carolina from scoring twice more on a John Kasay 39-yard field goal and a 37-yard field goal to go up 23–3. The Saints would show promise when Lynell Hamilton ran for a 1-yard touchdown to end the game at 23–10.

Game Notes: Mark Brunell was dismal completing 15 of his 29 attempts for 102 yards, 1 interception and a passer rating of 45.5. This marks the first time this season that the Saints did not have a productive quarterback, receiver or running back. This marks the second time the Saints have allowed a Carolina running back to run for over 100 yards in a game (DeAngelo Williams 149 yards week 9 & Jonathan Stewart 128 yards week 17). Sitting out allowed Drew Brees to break the NFL record for completion percentage in a season with 70.60, beating the previous NFL record of 70.55 by Ken Anderson of Cincinnati set in 1982. The Saints have home-field throughout the national football conference playoffs.

== Postseason ==
=== Schedule ===
| Round | Date | Opponent (seed) | Result | Record | Venue | Recap |
|---|---|---|---|---|---|---|
| Wild Card | Bye week | | | | | |
| Divisional | January 16 | Arizona Cardinals (4) | W 45–14 | 1–0 | Louisiana Superdome | Recap |
| NFC Championship | January 24 | Minnesota Vikings (2) | W 31–28 (OT) | 2–0 | Louisiana Superdome | Recap |
| Super Bowl XLIV | February 7 | vs. Indianapolis Colts (A1) | W 31–17 | 3–0 | Sun Life Stadium | Recap |

=== Game summaries ===
==== NFC Wildcard Round: Bye week ====
By earning the NFC top-seed, the Saints earned a bye week in the first round of the NFC Playoffs.

==== NFC Divisional Round: vs. Arizona Cardinals ====
Game summary

| Quarter | 1 | 2 | 3 | 4 | Total |
|---|---|---|---|---|---|
| Cardinals | 7 | 7 | 0 | 0 | 14 |
| Saints | 21 | 14 | 10 | 0 | 45 |

at Louisiana Superdome, New Orleans

- Game time: 3:34 p.m. CST
- Game weather: Played indoors, (domed stadium)
- Game attendance: 70,149
- Referee: Ron Winter (14)
- TV announcers (Fox): Kenny Albert (play-by-play), Daryl Johnston (color commentator), and Tony Siragusa (sideline reporter)
- Recap, Game Book

Game information

First quarter

- ARI – Tim Hightower 70-yard run (Neil Rackers kick), 14:41. Cardinals 7–0. Drive: 1 play, 70 yards, 0:19.
- NO – Lynell Hamilton 1-yard run (Garrett Hartley kick), 9:17. Tied 7–7. Drive: 10 plays, 72 yards, 5:24.
- NO – Jeremy Shockey 17-yard pass from Drew Brees (Garrett Hartley kick), 7:02. Saints 14–7. Drive: 4 plays, 37 yards, 1:58.
- NO – Reggie Bush 46-yard run (Garrett Hartley kick), 2:31. Saints 21–7. Drive: 5 plays, 77 yards, 2:54.

Second quarter

- ARI – Beanie Wells 4-yard run (Neil Rackers kick), 9:40. Saints 21–14. Drive: 9 plays, 80 yards, 5:07.
- NO – Devery Henderson 44-yard pass from Drew Brees (Garrett Hartley kick), 6:48. Saints 28–14. Drive: 6 plays, 83 yards, 2:52.
- NO – Marques Colston 2-yard pass from Drew Brees (Garrett Hartley kick), 1:10. Saints 35–14. Drive: 8 plays, 27 yards, 4:38.

Third quarter

- NO – Garrett Hartley 43-yard field goal, 8:26. Saints 38–14. Drive: 6 plays, 39 yards, 2:10.
- NO – Reggie Bush 83-yard punt return (Garrett Hartley kick), 6:42. Saints 45–14.

Fourth quarter

- No scoring plays

Top passers

- ARI – Kurt Warner – 17/26, 205 yards, 1 INT
- NO – Drew Brees – 23/32, 247 yards, 3 TDs

Top rushers

- ARI – Tim Hightower – 6 rushes, 87 yards, 1 TD
- NO – Reggie Bush – 5 rushes, 84 yards, 1 TD

Top receivers

- ARI – Larry Fitzgerald – 6 rec, 77 yards
- NO – Marques Colston – 6 rec, 83 yards, 1 TD

Entering the postseason as the NFC's #1 seed, the Saints began their playoff run at home in the NFC Divisional Round against the #4 Arizona Cardinals. New Orleans would immediately trail in the first quarter as Cardinals running back Tim Hightower ran for a 70-yard touchdown. The Saints would greatly respond with a 1-yard touchdown run from running back Lynell Hamilton, quarterback Drew Brees finding tight end Jeremy Shockey on a 17-yard touchdown pass, and running back Reggie Bush's 54-yard touchdown run. Arizona would reply in the second quarter with a 4-yard touchdown run from running back Chris "Beanie" Wells. Afterwards, New Orleans struck again as Brees found wide receiver Devery Henderson on a 44-yard touchdown pass, followed by wide receiver Marques Colston for a 2-yard touchdown pass.

In the third quarter, the Saints continued their offensive day as place-kicker Garrett Hartley kicked a 43-yard field goal, followed by Bush's 83-yard punt return for a touchdown. For the rest of the game, New Orleans' defense took control and shut down the Cardinal's offense.

With the win, the Saints advanced to the NFC Championship Game for the second time in franchise history.

==== NFC Championship Game: vs. Minnesota Vikings ====
Game summary

| Quarter | 1 | 2 | 3 | 4 | OT | Total |
|---|---|---|---|---|---|---|
| Vikings | 14 | 0 | 7 | 7 | 0 | 28 |
| Saints | 7 | 7 | 7 | 7 | 3 | 31 |

at Louisiana Superdome, New Orleans

- Game time: 5:45 p.m. CST
- Game weather: Played indoors, (domed stadium)
- Game attendance: 71,276
- Referee: Pete Morelli (135)
- TV announcers (Fox): Joe Buck (play-by-play), Troy Aikman (color commentator), Pam Oliver and Chris Myers (sideline reporters)
- Recap, Game Book

Game information

First quarter

- MIN – Adrian Peterson 19-yard run (Ryan Longwell kick), 9:35. Vikings 7–0. Drive: 10 plays, 80 yards, 5:25.
- NO – Pierre Thomas 38-yard pass from Drew Brees (Garrett Hartley kick), 6:30. Tied 7–7. Drive: 7 plays, 76 yards, 3:05.
- MIN – Sidney Rice 5-yard pass from Brett Favre (Ryan Longwell kick), 2:11. Vikings 14–7. Drive: 10 plays, 73 yards, 4:19.

Second quarter

- NO – Devery Henderson 9-yard pass from Drew Brees (Garrett Hartley kick), 10:30. Tied 14–14. Drive: 7 plays, 64 yards, 2:51.

Third quarter

- NO – Pierre Thomas 9-yard run (Garrett Hartley kick), 12:56. Saints 21–14. Drive: 4 plays, 37 yards, 2:04.
- MIN – Adrian Peterson 1-yard run (Ryan Longwell kick), 7:35. Tied 21–21. Drive: 9 plays, 80 yards, 5:21.

Fourth quarter

- NO – Reggie Bush 5-yard pass from Drew Brees (Garrett Hartley kick), 12:39. Saints 28–21. Drive: 3 plays, 7 yards, 1:31.
- MIN – Adrian Peterson 2-yard run (Ryan Longwell kick), 4:58. Tied 28–28. Drive: 7 plays, 57 yards, 2:59.

Overtime

- NO – Garrett Hartley 40-yard field goal, 10:15. Saints 31–28. Drive: 10 plays, 39 yards, 4:45.

Top passers

- MIN – Brett Favre – 28/46, 310 yards, 1 TD, 2 INTs
- NO – Drew Brees – 17/31, 197 yards, 3 TDs

Top rushers

- MIN – Adrian Peterson – 25 rushes, 122 yards, 3 TDs
- NO – Pierre Thomas – 14 rushes, 61 yards, 1 TD

Top receivers

- MIN – Bernard Berrian – 9 rec, 102 yards
- NO – Devery Henderson – 4 rec, 39 yards, 1 TD

Coming off their divisional home win over the Cardinals, the Saints stayed at home for the NFC Championship Game against the #2 Minnesota Vikings. New Orleans would initially trail in the first quarter as Vikings running back Adrian Peterson got a 19-yard touchdown run, yet the Saints responded with quarterback Drew Brees hooking up with running back Pierre Thomas on a 38-yard touchdown pass. However, Minnesota would answer with quarterback Brett Favre completing a 9-yard touchdown pass to wide receiver Sidney Rice. New Orleans would tie the game again in the second quarter with Brees finding wide receiver Devery Henderson on a 9-yard touchdown pass.

The Saints would take the lead in the third quarter with Thomas' 9-yard touchdown run, but the Vikings would tie the game with a 1-yard touchdown run from Peterson. In the fourth quarter, New Orleans would regain the lead as Brees found running back Reggie Bush on a 5-yard touchdown pass, yet Minnesota would tie again with Peterson's 2-yard touchdown run. A key interception late in 4th quarter by Tracy Porter stopped what could have been Minnesota's game-winning drive, leading to overtime. In overtime, the Saints came out on top as place-kicker Garrett Hartley booted the game-winning 40-yard field goal.

With the win, not only did the Saints improve their overall record to 15–3, but they would advance to their very first Super Bowl in franchise history.

==== Super Bowl XLIV: vs. Indianapolis Colts ====
Game summary

| Quarter | 1 | 2 | 3 | 4 | Total |
|---|---|---|---|---|---|
| Saints | 0 | 6 | 10 | 15 | 31 |
| Colts | 10 | 0 | 7 | 0 | 17 |

at Sun Life Stadium, Miami Gardens, Florida

- Date: February 7, 2010
- Game time: 6:31 p.m. EST/5:31 p.m. CST
- Game weather: 60 °F (16 °C), (clear)
- Game attendance: 74,059
- Referee: Scott Green (19)
- TV announcers (CBS): Jim Nantz (play-by-play), Phil Simms (color commentator), Steve Tasker and Solomon Wilcots (sideline reporters)
- Recap, Game Book

Game information

First quarter

- IND – Matt Stover 38-yard field goal, 7:29. Colts 3–0. Drive: 11 plays, 53 yards, 5:53.
- IND – Pierre Garçon 19-yard pass from Peyton Manning (Matt Stover kick), 0:36. Colts 10–0. Drive: 11 plays, 96 yards, 4:36.

Second quarter

- NO – Garrett Hartley 46-yard field goal, 9:34. Colts 10–3. Drive: 11 plays, 60 yards, 6:02.
- NO – Garrett Hartley 44-yard field goal, 0:00. Colts 10–6. Drive: 5 plays, 26 yards, 0:35.

Third quarter

- NO – Pierre Thomas 16-yard pass from Drew Brees (Garrett Hartley kick), 11:41. Saints 13–10. Drive: 6 plays, 58 yards, 3:19.
- IND – Joseph Addai 4-yard run (Matt Stover kick), 6:15. Colts 17–13. Drive: 10 plays, 76 yards, 5:26.
- NO – Garrett Hartley 47-yard field goal, 2:01. Colts 17–16. Drive: 8 plays, 37 yards, 4:14.

Fourth quarter

- NO – Jeremy Shockey 2-yard pass from Drew Brees (Lance Moore pass from Drew Brees), 5:42. Saints 24–17. Drive: 9 plays, 59 yards, 4:57.
- NO – Tracy Porter 74-yard interception return (Garrett Hartley kick), 3:12. Saints 31–17.

Top passers

- NO – Drew Brees – 32/38, 288 yards, 2 TDs
- IND – Peyton Manning – 31/45, 333 yards, 1 TD, 1 INT

Top rushers

- NO – Pierre Thomas – 9 rushes, 30 yards
- IND – Joseph Addai – 13 rushes, 77 yards, 1 TD

Top receivers

- NO – Marques Colston – 7 rec, 83 yards
  Devery Henderson – 7 rec, 63 yards
- IND – Dallas Clark – 7 rec, 86 yards
  Joseph Addai – 7 rec, 58 yards

In continuation of a string of firsts, the Saints advanced to their first Super Bowl in franchise history and won it in dramatic fashion. After the coin toss, the Saints wanted the ball first; however, they did not score on their first drive. The Colts drove the ball down the field, attempting to score the first touchdown, but were denied and Matt Stover was forced to kick a 38-yard field goal. But the Colts were not finished: on their next possession, Pierre Garçon caught a 19-yard TD pass from Peyton Manning, and the Colts led 10–0 after fifteen minutes. In the second quarter, the Saints were forced to look upon Garrett Hartley for two field goals – a 46 yarder and a 44 yarder respectively – and the deficit was reduced to four points by halftime. Garrett Hartley ended the half with the Super Bowl record for kicks of more than 40 yards, with 3.

Kicking off the second half, the Saints caught Indy by surprise with the "Ambush" play (an onside kick in kickoff formation), which the Saints recovered, shifting the momentum to them. Pierre Thomas caught a 16-yard screen pass from Drew Brees and NO had their first lead of the game, 13–10 after the extra point. The Colts would not be denied from scoring again with the rushing attack of Joseph Addai, capping off the scoring drive with a 4-yard run. From here, however, the Colts would be denied. The Saints still stood by Hartley to keep the game close with a 47-yard field goal, taking the score to 17–16. In the fourth quarter, Jeremy Shockey caught a two-yard touchdown pass from Drew Brees with Lance Moore catching a two-point conversion and the Saints led 24–17. On the Colts ensuing possession, season MVP quarterback Peyton Manning swiftly moved the Indianapolis offense into Saints territory, off four passes for 44 yards, vying for the tying score. However, in the end, it was the Saints defense that would prove championship worthy, when Tracy Porter intercepted and returned Manning's shotgun pass 74 yards for a touchdown to seal the win and the first Super Bowl title for the New Orleans Saints in their 44-year existence. With the win in the Super Bowl, the Saints not only finished their season with a 16–3 record, but Drew Brees also became the MVP in this game, thus rebuilding popularity in the city of New Orleans.

== Media ==
=== Pre season Local TV ===
| Channel | Play-by-play | Color commentator | Sideline reporter |
|---|---|---|---|
| CST | Tim Brando | Spencer Tillman | Mike Nabors |

=== Local Radio ===
| Flagship station | Play-by-play | Color commentator | Sideline reporter | Studio host |
|---|---|---|---|---|
| WWL–AM 870/WWL-FM 105.3 | Jim Henderson | Hokie Gajan | Kristian Garic | Bobby Hebert |
