= Lynell Hamilton =

American football player and coach (born 1985)

No. 30
- Position: Running back

Personal information
- Born: August 5, 1985 (age 41); Stockton, California, U.S.
- Listed height: 6 ft 0 in (1.83 m)
- Listed weight: 225 lb (102 kg)

Career information
- High school: Edison (Stockton, California)
- College: San Diego State
- NFL draft: 2008: undrafted

Career history

Playing
- New Orleans Saints (2008–2010)

Coaching
- San Diego State (2011–2014) Graduate assistant

Awards and highlights
- Super Bowl champion (XLIV); Freshman All-American (2003); MW Freshman of the Year (2003); First-team All-MW (2003)
- Stats at Pro Football Reference

Lynell Hamilton (born August 5, 1985) is an American former football player and coach. He played as a running back for three seasons with the New Orleans Saints of the National Football League (NFL). He played college football for the San Diego State Aztecs and was signed by the Saints as an undrafted free agent in 2008.

== Early career ==
Hamilton attended Edison High School in Stockton, where he was ranked as one of the country's top running back prospects.

== College career ==
In 2003, Hamilton had an outstanding freshman year at San Diego State, rushing for 1,087 yards in 10 games. He was named Mountain West Conference Freshman of the Year. He suffered a severe ankle and leg injury in the tenth game of the season, and sat out the following year. As a redshirt sophomore in 2005, he led the Aztecs in rushing with 819 yards and 9 touchdowns. The rest of his career was hampered by knee injuries, and he had only 56 carries for 146 yards during his last two years. For his college career, Hamilton had 480 carries for 2,052 yards and 14 rushing touchdowns, and 57 passes caught for 360 yards and 3 touchdowns.

== Professional career ==
Hamilton was on the New Orleans Saints practice squad for most of 2008, and played in only three games. In 2009 he served as the fourth running back for the Saints behind Pierre Thomas, Reggie Bush, and Mike Bell. He finished the regular season with a total of 125 rushing yards and 2 touchdowns; he also scored a touchdown in the Saints' first playoff game on their way to winning Super Bowl XLIV. He was expected to fill a more important role in 2010, but on August 11, 2010, during a preseason joint practice session with the New England Patriots, he suffered a knee injury (later confirmed to be an ACL tear) that was expected to end Hamilton's season. He was "waived/injured" by the Saints on August 14, and after clearing waivers he was placed on the injured reserve list on August 16. He was waived on August 4, 2011, during training camp.

After his playing career ended, he returned to San Diego State as a graduate assistant.
