= Bret Ingalls =

American football player and coach (born 1960)

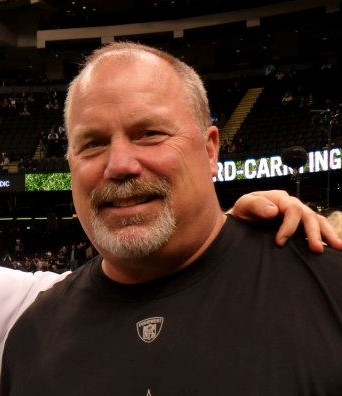

Biographical details
- Born: August 19, 1960 (age 66); San Jose, California, U.S.
- Education: University of Idaho

Playing career
- 1978: Colorado
- 1979–1981: Wichita State
- Position: Halfback

Coaching career (HC unless noted)
- 1982–1988: Idaho (GA/RB/OL)
- 1989–1993: San Diego State (RB/OL/OC)
- 1994: Eastern Michigan (OL)
- 1995–1996: Louisville (OC)
- 1997–1999: Northern Iowa (OC)
- 2000–2003: Idaho (OC)
- 2004: Indiana State (TE/OL)
- 2005: Miami (OH) (TE/OL)
- 2006–2008: Northwestern (OL)
- 2009–2016: New Orleans Saints (RB/OL)
- 2016–2017: Florida (OA)
- 2018–2020: Vanderbilt (Sr. OA)
- 2021: Utah (OA)
- 2022–2025: Michigan (Sr. OA)

Accomplishments and honors

Championships
- CFP national champion (2023); Super Bowl champion (XLIV)

Bret Alexander Ingalls (born August 19, 1960) is an American football coach. He was most recently an assistant coach at the University of Michigan from 2022 until 2025. Ingalls was also an assistant coach with the New Orleans Saints of the National Football League (NFL) from 2009 to 2016. He served as an offensive coordinator at San Diego State University, the University of Louisville, Northern Iowa University, and the University of Idaho between 1992 and 2003.

== Early life ==
Bret Alexander Ingalls was born in 1960 to James L. Ingalls and Elizabeth Ingalls (Sites). His father was an all-state football player and went on to play semi-professional football for the Seattle Ramblers. He is a graduate of Snohomish High School, in Snohomish, Washington, where he played trumpet in the jazz band and lettered in football, basketball, and baseball. In the 1976–77 season, under the leadership of head coach Dick Armstrong, Ingalls helped the Snohomish High Panthers win the school's first state championship. In his senior season, he received All-American honors as a halfback for the Panthers. Ingalls earned an athletic scholarship to Colorado, but transferred after his first year to Wichita State. His career was ultimately cut short by a neck injury.

== Coaching career ==
=== College ===
Ingalls started his coaching career as an offensive graduate assistant at Idaho in 1982 for first time head coach Dennis Erickson. He then moved on to coach defensive backs, running backs, and offensive line through 1988, and the Vandals won four Big Sky conference championships. In 1989, Ingalls was hired as running backs coach by the San Diego State Aztecs, and offensive coordinator in 1993. Ingalls coached three-time All-American running back and Marshall Faulk, a future hall of famer. Ingalls continued to coach as offensive coordinator at Louisville in 1995 and 1996, Northern Iowa from 1997 to 1999.

In 2000, he returned to his alma mater as the offensive coordinator alongside head coach Tom Cable for four seasons. Ingalls then served short stints at Indiana State and Miami(OH), before joining Northwestern in 2006. In 2008, Ingalls helped the Wildcats to 142 yards per game despite starting five first-year starters.

=== New Orleans Saints ===
Ingalls was hired by the New Orleans Saints in 2009 as the running backs coach, before being named the offensive line coach in 2013. As the running backs coach in 2009, Ingalls coached the trio known as the 'three-headed monster' made up of Pierre Thomas, Reggie Bush, and Mike Bell. Additional backs that have played under Ingalls include Chris Ivory, Mark Ingram II and Darren Sproles. In Ingalls first season the Saints attained a 13–3 regular season record and successfully went on to win the franchise's first NFL championship in Super Bowl XLIV. In 2009 the Saints were the No. 1 overall offense, finishing No. 6 in rushing (131.6 ypg) and No. 4 in passing (272.2 ypg). As the offensive line coach, Ingalls coached 6-time Pro-Bowler Jahri Evans, in addition to developing new pro linemen Terron Armstead and Andrus Peat. In the 2015 season, the Saints offensive line was ranked No. 3 by Pro Football Focus.

=== Return to college ===
Ingalls was hired by second year Florida Gators head coach Jim McElwain as an offensive assistant in 2016. Ingalls continued in similar role for the Vanderbilt Commodores between 2018 and 2020.

At the end of the 2020 season, Ingalls joined the coaching staff of the Utah Utes as an offensive analyst. After the Utes appeared in the 2022 Rose Bowl against the Ohio State, Ingalls was hired as offensive analyst for the Michigan Wolverines in March 2022.

== Personal life ==
Ingalls is married to his wife Diana, and the couple have three children. He is a 1982 graduate of the University of Idaho and holds a degree in Business Management. Ingalls started graduate studies at Idaho before taking a permanent position on the football staff.
