= Remi Ayodele =

American football player (born 1983)

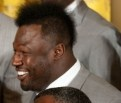

No. 92
- Position: Defensive tackle

Personal information
- Born: April 22, 1983 (age 43); Grand Prairie, Texas, U.S.
- Listed height: 6 ft 3 in (1.91 m)
- Listed weight: 318 lb (144 kg)

Career information
- High school: South Grand Prairie
- College: Oklahoma and Northeastern Oklahoma A&M
- NFL draft: 2006: undrafted

Career history
- New England Patriots (2006)*; Baltimore Ravens (2006)*; Dallas Cowboys (2006)*; Baltimore Ravens (2006)*; Dallas Cowboys (2007)*; → Frankfurt Galaxy (2007); Atlanta Falcons (2007)*; Dallas Cowboys (2007); New Orleans Saints (2008–2010); Minnesota Vikings (2011); New Orleans Saints (2012)*
- * Offseason or practice squad member only

Awards and highlights
- Super Bowl champion (XLIV)

Career NFL statistics
- Games played: 60
- Total tackles: 90
- Sacks: 4
- Forced fumbles: 2
- Fumble recoveries: 1
- Defensive touchdowns: 1
- Stats at Pro Football Reference

Remilekun Ayodele (born April 22, 1983) is an American former professional football player who was a defensive tackle in the National Football League (NFL) for the Dallas Cowboys, New Orleans Saints, and Minnesota Vikings. He played college football for the Oklahoma Sooners.

== Early life ==
Ayodele attended South Grand Prairie High School in Grand Prairie, Texas, where he played as a defensive end.

He accepted a football scholarship from Purdue University, following on the footsteps of his older brother Akin Ayodele. As a redshirt freshman, he was asked to switch positions to defensive tackle, so he made the decision to transfer to Northeastern Oklahoma A&M College.

In his 2 seasons with the Golden Norsemen, he contributed to the team having a 21–3 record. He posted 50 tackles, 3 sacks and one fumble recovery. As a sophomore in 2003, he helped the team win a second straight conference championship, a second place national ranking and a bowl title.

He transferred after his sophomore season to the University of Oklahoma. As a junior, he started 2 games at defensive tackle, making 11 tackles, 3 tackles for loss and 3 sacks. As a senior, he started 6 games, posting 11 tackles (6 for loss), one sack and one fumble recovery.

== Professional career ==
=== Early career ===
Ayodele was signed as an undrafted free agent by the New England Patriots after the 2006 NFL draft on May 8. He was waived on June 16. On July 27, he was signed as a free agent by the Baltimore Ravens. He was released on September 2.

On November 7, 2006, he was signed by the Dallas Cowboys to the practice squad. He was cut in November 27. He was signed to the Ravens practice squad on December 5.

On February 9, 2007, he was re-signed by the Cowboys and allocated to the Frankfurt Galaxy of NFL Europa on February 12. He made 15 tackles, one sack and one pass breakup. He was released by the Cowboys on September 1.

On September 3, 2007, he was claimed off waivers by the Atlanta Falcons. He was released before the season opener on September 7.

=== Dallas Cowboys (second stint) ===
On September 11, 2007, he was signed by the Dallas Cowboys for depth purposes, after starting nose tackle Jason Ferguson was lost for the year with a biceps injury. He appeared in 7 games and was declared inactive for 5 contests, as a backup to nose tackle Jay Ratliff, who was moved from defensive end to replace Ferguson. He tallied 5 tackles and one forced fumble.

Ayodele also had a chance to play on the same team with his brother Akin. On December 11, he was released and signed to the practice squad on December 14, where he spent the final four weeks of the season. He was cut on August 31, 2008.

=== New Orleans Saints (first stint) ===
On September 3, 2008, he was signed by the New Orleans Saints to the practice squad. He was promoted to the active roster on October 4. On November 11, he was cut and re-signed to the practice squad three days later. On December 20, he was promoted to the active roster for the last 2 games of the season. He appeared in 6 games, making 7 tackles (2 solo).

In 2009, he became a starter (13 starts) at left defensive tackle after Kendrick Clancy injured his knee in the season opener. On October 4, he scored his first touchdown after defensive lineman Will Smith forced Jets quarterback Mark Sanchez to fumble, with Ayodele recovering the ball and returning it for a touchdown. He made 8 tackles against the Dallas Cowboys. He registered 53 tackles (22 solo), 1.5 sacks, one pass defense and one fumble recovery during the regular season. On January 24, 2010, he had 8 tackles (4 solo) and recovered one fumble in the NFC Championship Game that led to a touchdown against the Minnesota Vikings. He was a part of the Super Bowl XLIV winning team.

In 2010, he started all 16 games, posting 73 tackles (25 solo), one sack, one pass defensed and one forced fumble, helping the defense ranking improve from 25th to 4th. In his Saints career, he appeared in 37 games, with 29 starts at nose tackle, while posting 133 tackles, 2.5 sacks, 2 passes defensed, one forced fumble and on fumble recovery, which came in the end zone for a touchdown.

=== Minnesota Vikings ===
On July 28, 2011, he signed a three-year deal as a free agent with the Minnesota Vikings, with the intention of replacing the veteran Pat Williams. He played in 16 games (13 starts), registering 22 tackles (11 solo) and 1½ sacks. He was released on March 21, 2012.

=== New Orleans Saints (second stint) ===
On May 7, 2012, Ayodele returned to the New Orleans Saints with a one-year contract. He was cut on August 27.

== Personal life ==
His older brother Akin Ayodele played linebacker in the NFL.
