= Panthers–Saints rivalry =

National Football League rivalry in the US

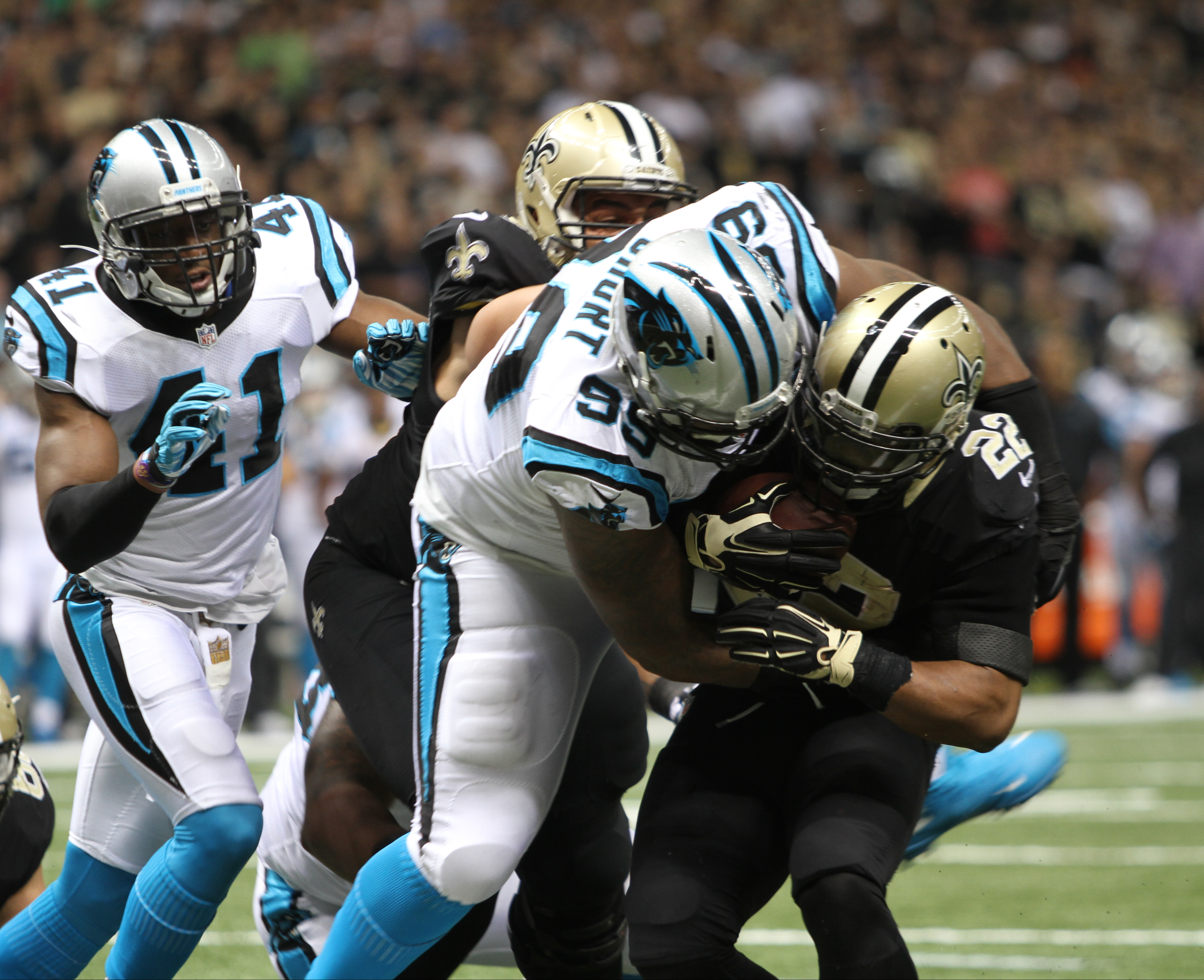
- Saints and Panthers face off during the 2015 season.

- Carolina Panthers New Orleans Saints
- Location: Charlotte, New Orleans
- First meeting: October 22, 1995; Panthers 20, Saints 3
- Latest meeting: November 15, 2026; Panthers 20, Saints 17
- Next meeting: December 13, 2026
- Stadiums: Panthers: Bank of America Stadium; Saints: Caesars Superdome

Statistics
- Total meetings: 64
- All-time series: Saints: 34–30
- Regular season series: Saints: 33–30
- Postseason results: Saints: 1–0
- Largest victory: Panthers: 45–13 (1999); Saints: 47–10 (2024)
- Most points scored: Panthers: 45 (1999); Saints: 47 (2024)
- Longest win streak: Panthers: 4 (2002–2004, 2005–2007); Saints: 5 (2000–2002)
- Current win streak: Panthers: 1 (2026—present)

Post-season history
- 2017 NFC Wild Card: Saints won: 31–26
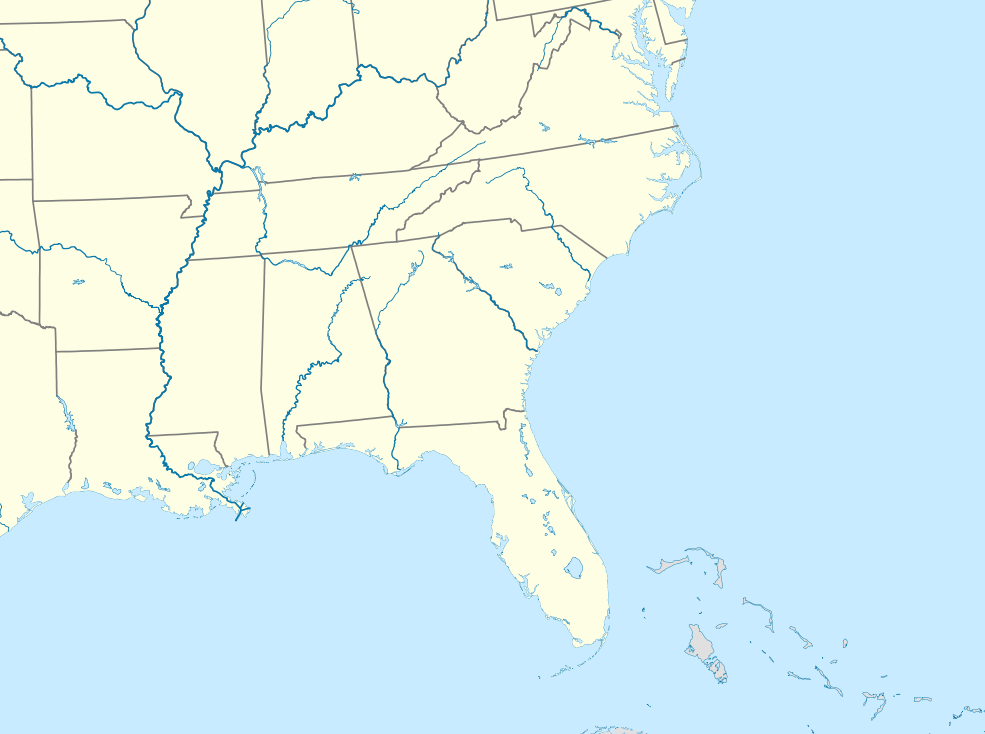

The Panthers–Saints rivalry is a National Football League (NFL) rivalry between the Carolina Panthers and New Orleans Saints.

The Panthers joined the NFL as an expansion team in the 1995 season, joining the Saints as members of the NFC West. As part of the NFL's 2002 division realignment, the Panthers and Saints were both placed in the newly formed NFC South. As divisional rivals, the two teams play each other twice each season.

The Saints lead the overall series, 34–30. The two teams have met once in the playoffs, with the Saints winning.

== Background ==
The Saints began play in 1967. The Panthers, meanwhile, were officially accepted as an NFL franchise in 1993. They began play in 1995, joining the Saints in the NFC West Division. Both located in the Southeastern United States, the Panthers and Saints had a natural geographic rivalry set-up. Ultimately, the Panthers and Saints would develop an evenly and hotly-contested rivalry. The latter would also become the most commonly-faced opponent for the former. For their entire rivalry, the two have been divisional rivals, mostly as members of the NFC South alongside the Atlanta Falcons and Tampa Bay Buccaneers.

== 1995–2001: NFC West rivals ==
On October 22, 1995, the Panthers won the first game between the two teams, 20–3. From 2000 to 2002, the Saints went on a five-game winning streak over the Panthers, their longest of the rivalry.

Sam Mills was a figure of the early Panthers–Saints rivalry. A member of the Saints' "Dome Patrol" until 1994, Mills left New Orleans to join the Panthers for their inaugural 1995 season. Mills took exception to the Saints only expressing interest in re-signing him after the Panthers made him an offer during free agency. Mills would later become a member of both the Saints' Hall of Fame and Panthers' Hall of Honor.

== 2002–2010: Joining the NFC South and arrival of Drew Brees ==
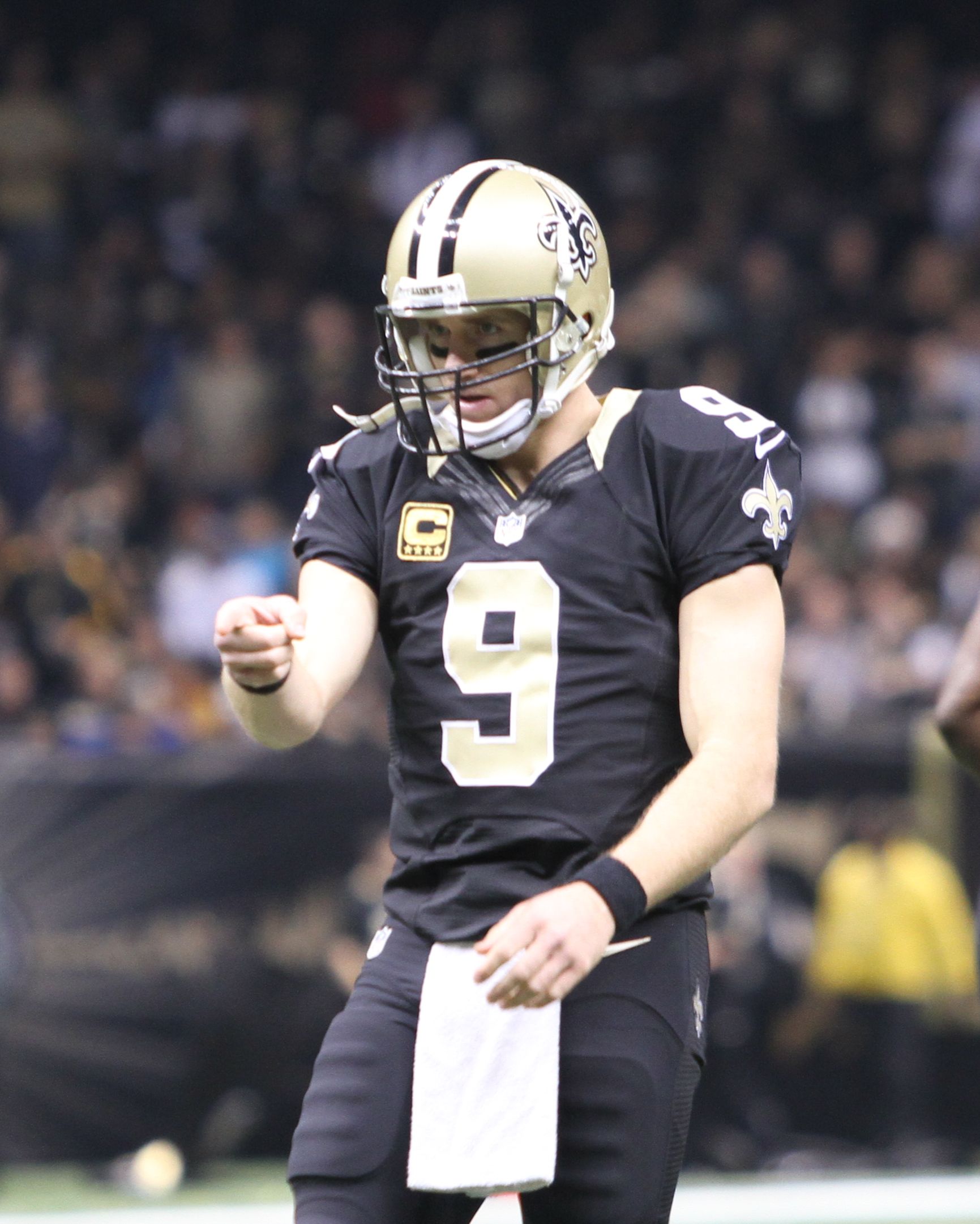
Drew Brees was a central figure of the rivalry from 2006–2020

After facing off as NFC West rivals from 1995 to 2001, the Saints and Panthers were moved to the newly formed NFC South in 2002.

In 2003, the Panthers defeated the Saints 23–20 in an overtime game en route to their first Super Bowl appearance.

In 2006, quarterback Drew Brees joined the Saints. Sean Payton also joined New Orleans as the team's head coach. The Brees–Payton pairing brought the franchise success, which it notably lacked prior to their arrival. Brees' record against the Panthers was documented to be historically close in both 2012 and 2015. However, Brees would win his final 8 matches against Carolina and finish his career with an 18–11 record against them. (Note: This win–loss record includes his 1–0 record against the Panthers during his tenure with the San Diego Chargers and his 17–11 record against the Panthers during his tenure with the Saints.) In his first twelve seasons as the Saints' starter, Brees only missed two games, both road losses at Carolina.

== 2011–2017: Cam Newton in Carolina and playoff matchup ==
After a poor performance during their 2010 season, the Carolina Panthers selected quarterback Cam Newton first overall during the 2011 NFL draft. Linebacker Luke Kuechly was drafted by the Panthers in 2012, becoming a noted figure in the rivalry. Newton was allegedly one of the quarterbacks named in the Saints' Bountygate scandal.

During the final week of the 2011 season, the Saints defeated the Panthers. In the game, Brees extended his single-season record for most passing yards, finishing the season with 5,476 and also set the single-season record for most passing completions. In the game, Newton also became the first rookie quarterback to pass for over 4,000 yards in a season.

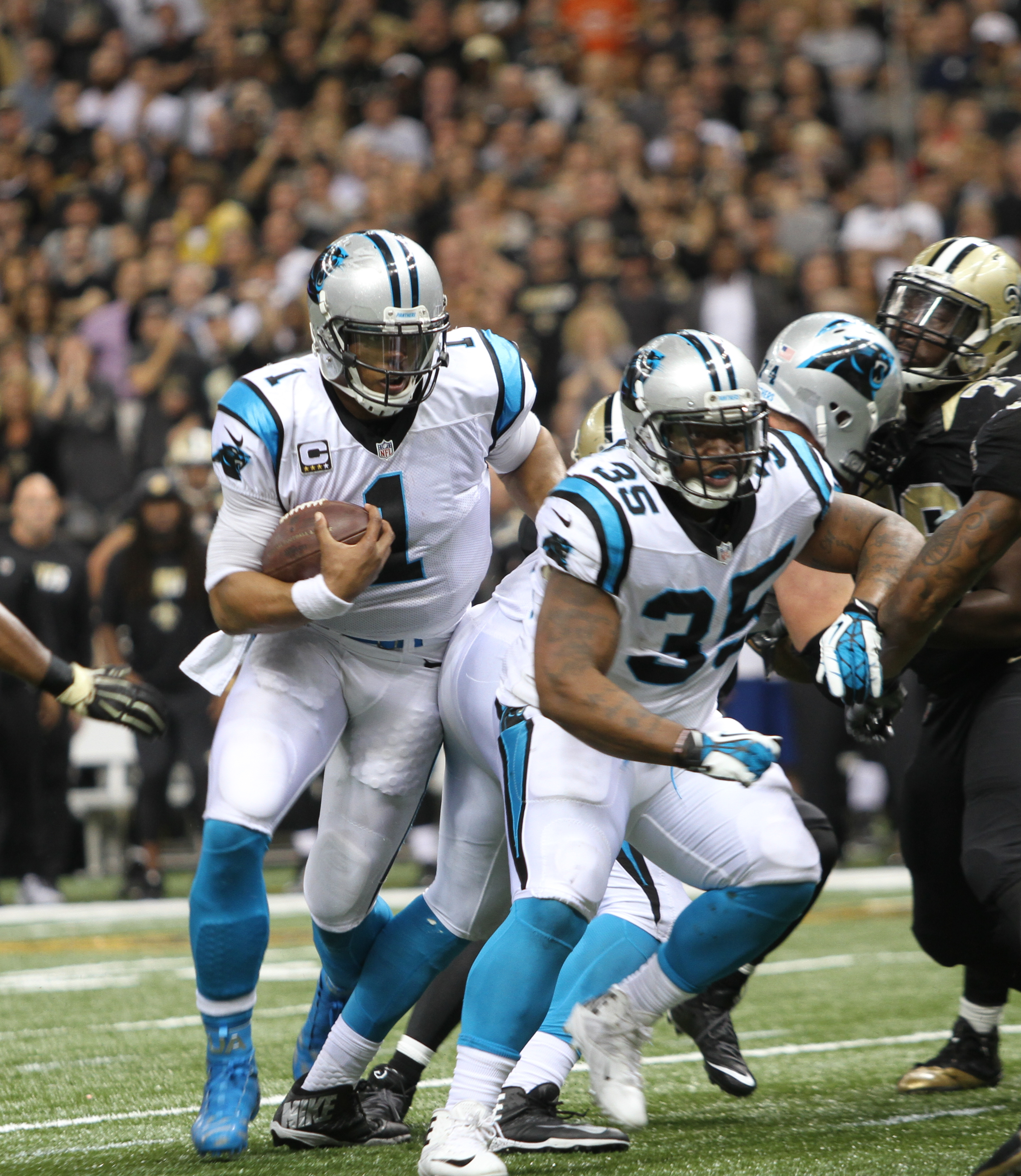
Cam Newton (#1) with the ball during Panthers–Saints game in December 2015

Often engaging in physical and hotly-contested matches, the Saints and Panthers have had scuffles and brawls during matches against each other. The 2014 season saw chippy games between the two squads; during the second matchup, the teams engaged in numerous fights and "an infamous all-out brawl after a Cam Newton touchdown run, resulting in multiple player ejections."

Both teams were successful during their 2017 campaigns, each winning 11 games. The Saints won both regular season matches and won the NFC South division, but the Panthers qualified for the postseason as a wild card. This set up a third game between the two teams during the NFC Wild Card round. New Orleans won at home in what would be a close game, 31–26.

== 2018–2021: Final seasons of Brees and Newton ==
The Panthers and Newton would part ways following the 2019 season. Brees would retire from the NFL following the 2020 season. Brees passed for 7,949 yards and 55 touchdowns in his career against the Panthers, both figures higher than any other player. In what would be his final regular season game, Brees threw for three touchdowns and led the Saints to a 33–7 victory over the Panthers. In doing so, the Saints completed a season sweep of the entire NFC South division, becoming the first team to do so.

Newton briefly returned to the Panthers in 2021, but was on the bench against the Saints. The 2021 season would also be the last for Payton, as he retired from coaching following the season; he later returned to coach the Denver Broncos in 2023.

== Season-by-season results ==
Carolina Panthers vs. New Orleans Saints Season-by-Season Results
1990s (Panthers, 6–4)

Season	Season series	at Carolina Panthers	at New Orleans Saints	Overall series	Notes
1995	Tie 1–1	Panthers; 20–3	Saints; 34–26	Tied; 1–1	Panthers join the National Football League (NFL) as an expansion team. They are placed in the National Football Conference (NFC) and the NFC West, resulting in two meetings annually with the Saints.
1996	Panthers 2–0	Panthers; 19–7	Panthers; 22–20	Panthers; 3–1	Panthers open Ericsson Stadium (now known as Bank of America Stadium). Following their loss in Carolina, Saints head coach Jim Mora delivers famous "Diddly Poo" press conference and then resigns the following day.
1997	Tie 1–1	Saints; 16–13	Panthers; 13–0	Panthers; 4–2	
1998	Tie 1–1	Panthers; 31–17	Saints; 19–14	Panthers; 5–3	
1999	Tie 1–1	Panthers; 45–13	Saints; 19–10	Panthers; 6–4	In Carolina, Panthers record their largest victory over the Saints with a 32–point differential and score their most points in a game against the Saints.

2000s (Panthers, 11–9)

Season	Season series	at Carolina Panthers	at New Orleans Saints	Overall series	Notes
2000	Saints 2–0	Saints; 20–10	Saints; 24–6	Tied; 6–6	Saints record their first season sweep of the Panthers.
2001	Saints 2–0	Saints; 27–25	Saints; 27–23	Saints; 8–6	
2002	Tie 1–1	Saints; 34–24	Panthers; 10–6	Saints; 9–7	During the NFL realignment, both teams are moved to the NFC South.
2003	Panthers 2–0	Panthers; 19–13	Panthers; 23–20 (OT)	Tied; 9–9	Panthers lose Super Bowl XXXVIII.
2004	Tie 1–1	Saints; 21–18	Panthers; 32–21	Tied; 10–10	
2005	Tie 1–1	Saints; 23–20	Panthers; 27–10	Tied; 11–11	Due to Hurricane Katrina, Saints' home game was played at Tiger Stadium in Baton Rouge.
2006	Panthers 2–0	Panthers; 21–18	Panthers; 31–21	Panthers; 13–11	Saints trade for QB Drew Brees.
2007	Tie 1–1	Saints; 31–6	Panthers; 16–13	Panthers; 14–12	
2008	Panthers 2–0	Panthers; 30–7	Panthers; 33–31	Panthers; 16–12	Panthers win seven straight road meetings (2002–2008).
2009	Tie 1–1	Panthers; 23–10	Saints; 30–20	Panthers; 17–13	Panthers' win is the Saints' only road loss in their 2009 season. Saints win Super Bowl XLIV.

2010s (Saints, 13–8)

Season	Season series	at Carolina Panthers	at New Orleans Saints	Overall series	Notes
2010	Saints 2–0	Saints; 34–3	Saints; 16–14	Panthers; 17–15	
2011	Saints 2–0	Saints; 30–27	Saints; 45–17	Tied; 17–17	Panthers draft QB Cam Newton.
2012	Panthers 2–0	Panthers; 35–27	Panthers; 44–38	Panthers; 19–17	
2013	Tie 1–1	Panthers; 17–13	Saints; 31–13	Panthers; 20–18	Panthers clinch the NFC South with their win.
2014	Tie 1–1	Saints; 28–10	Panthers; 41–10	Panthers; 21–19	
2015	Panthers 2–0	Panthers; 27–22	Panthers; 41–38	Panthers; 23–19	Cam Newton named AP MVP. Panthers lose Super Bowl 50.
2016	Tie 1–1	Panthers; 23–20	Saints; 41–38	Panthers; 24–20	
2017	Saints 2–0	Saints; 34–13	Saints; 31–21	Panthers; 24–22	Both teams finish with 11–5 records, but the Saints clinched the NFC South based on their head-to-head sweep, setting up a playoff matchup at New Orleans.
2017 Playoffs	Saints 1–0	—N/a	Saints; 31–26	Panthers; 24–23	First postseason meeting. NFC Wild Card.
2018	Tie 1–1	Saints; 12–9	Panthers; 33–14	Panthers; 25–24	
2019	Saints 2–0	Saints; 42–10	Saints; 34–31	Saints; 26–25	Last start in the series for Cam Newton.

2020s (Saints, 8–5)

Season	Season series	at Carolina Panthers	at New Orleans Saints	Overall series	Notes
2020	Saints 2–0	Saints; 33–7	Saints; 27–24	Saints; 28–25	Game in Carolina was Drew Brees' final career regular season game and victory.
2021	Tie 1–1	Panthers; 26–7	Saints; 18–10	Saints; 29–26	
2022	Panthers 2–0	Panthers; 22–14	Panthers; 10–7	Saints; 29–28	
2023	Saints 2–0	Saints; 20–17	Saints; 28–6	Saints; 31–28	
2024	Tie 1–1	Panthers; 23–22	Saints; 47–10	Saints; 32–29	In New Orleans, Saints record their largest victory over the Panthers with a 37–point differential and score their most points in a game against the Panthers.
2025	Saints 2–0	Saints; 17–7	Saints; 20–17	Saints; 34–29	
2026	Panthers 1–0	December 13	Panthers; 20–17	Saints; 34–30	

Summary of Results

Season	Season series	at Carolina Panthers	at New Orleans Saints	Notes
Regular season	Saints 33–30	Saints 16–15	Saints 17–15	Panthers are 1–0 at Tiger Stadium in Baton Rouge, Louisiana (2005), accounted as a Saints' home game.
Postseason	Saints 1–0	no games	Saints 1–0	NFC Wild Card: 2017
Regular and postseason	Saints 34–30	Saints 16–15	Saints 18–15	

== See also ==
- List of NFL rivalries
- NFC South
