= Kendrick Clancy =

American football player (born 1978)

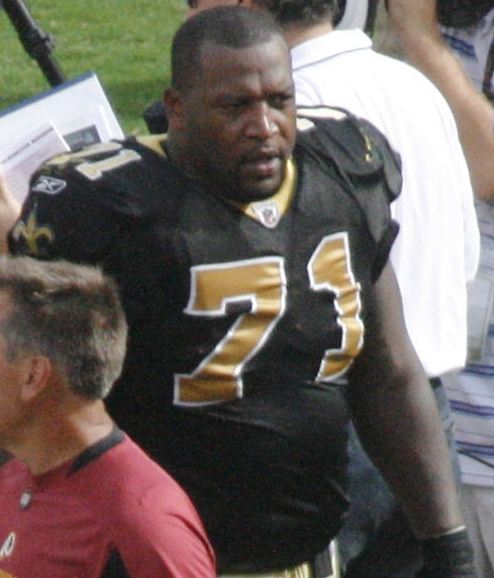
- Clancy with the New Orleans Saints in 2008

No. 96, 70, 71
- Position: Defensive tackle

Personal information
- Born: September 17, 1978 (age 48); Tuscaloosa, Alabama, U.S.
- Listed height: 6 ft 1 in (1.85 m)
- Listed weight: 305 lb (138 kg)

Career information
- High school: Tuscaloosa (AL) Holt
- College: Mississippi
- NFL draft: 2000: 3rd round, 72nd overall pick

Career history
- Pittsburgh Steelers (2000–2004); New York Giants (2005); Arizona Cardinals (2006); New Orleans Saints (2007–2009)

Awards and highlights
- Super Bowl champion (XLIV); Third-team All-American (1999); Second-team All-SEC (1999)

Career NFL statistics
- Total tackles: 159
- Sacks: 5.5
- Forced fumbles: 3
- Fumble recoveries: 3
- Interceptions: 1
- Stats at Pro Football Reference

Lakendrick Tridel Clancy (born September 17, 1978) is an American former professional football player who was a defensive tackle in the National Football League (NFL). He was selected by the Pittsburgh Steelers in 2000, having also played for the New York Giants, Arizona Cardinals and New Orleans Saints. He played college football at the University of Mississippi.

== Early life and college ==
Born in Tuscaloosa, Alabama, Clancy attended Holt High School before playing college football at East Central Community College in Decatur, Mississippi, and then at Ole Miss. As a senior in 1999, he was team captain and a third-team All-American selection by The Sporting News and The Football News

== Professional career ==
Clancy was selected by the Steelers in the third round in 2000 and played for them for four years. After his time with the Steelers, he signed with the Giants, where he played for one year, followed by a year with the Cardinals. He then signed with the Saints in 2007. In 2009, he began the season as a projected starter, but injured his knee in the opening game, thus played in only 2 games, ending up on the injured reserve list while the team won Super Bowl XLIV. He was an unrestricted free agent after the 2009 season, but the Saints re-signed him on August 30, 2010. He was released 5 days later.

== NFL career statistics ==
Legend
| **Bold** | Career high |

| Year | Team | Games | | Tackles | | | | | Interceptions | | | | | Fumbles | | | |
| Year | Team | GP | GS | Cmb | Solo | Ast | Sck | TFL | Int | Yds | TD | Lng | PD | FF | FR | Yds | TD |
|---|---|---|---|---|---|---|---|---|---|---|---|---|---|---|---|---|---|
| 2000 | PIT | 9 | 0 | 8 | 5 | 3 | 0.0 | 1 | 0 | 0 | 0 | 0 | 0 | 0 | 0 | 0 | 0 |
| 2001 | PIT | 16 | 4 | 15 | 11 | 4 | 0.0 | 2 | **1** | **3** | 0 | **3** | 1 | 0 | 0 | 0 | 0 |
| 2002 | PIT | 7 | 0 | 4 | 4 | 0 | 0.0 | 0 | 0 | 0 | 0 | 0 | 0 | 0 | 0 | 0 | 0 |
| 2003 | PIT | 12 | 0 | 5 | 5 | 0 | 0.0 | 0 | 0 | 0 | 0 | 0 | 0 | 0 | **1** | 0 | 0 |
| 2004 | PIT | 8 | 0 | 8 | 7 | 1 | 0.0 | 1 | 0 | 0 | 0 | 0 | 0 | 0 | 0 | 0 | 0 |
| 2005 | NYG | 16 | 15 | **39** | **32** | 7 | **2.0** | **10** | 0 | 0 | 0 | 0 | 0 | **2** | **1** | 0 | 0 |
| 2006 | ARI | 11 | 11 | 29 | 25 | 4 | 1.0 | 2 | 0 | 0 | 0 | 0 | 0 | 1 | 0 | 0 | 0 |
| 2007 | NOR | 14 | 2 | 15 | 10 | 5 | 0.5 | 3 | 0 | 0 | 0 | 0 | 0 | 0 | 0 | 0 | 0 |
| 2008 | NOR | 14 | 14 | 34 | 26 | **8** | **2.0** | 3 | 0 | 0 | 0 | 0 | **3** | 0 | **1** | 0 | 0 |
| 2009 | NOR | 2 | 0 | 2 | 1 | 1 | 0.0 | 0 | 0 | 0 | 0 | 0 | 0 | 0 | 0 | 0 | 0 |
| | | 109 | 46 | 159 | 126 | 33 | 5.5 | 22 | 1 | 3 | 0 | 3 | 4 | 3 | 3 | 0 | 0 |

=== Playoffs ===
| Year | Team | Games | | Tackles | | | | | Interceptions | | | | | Fumbles | | | |
| Year | Team | GP | GS | Cmb | Solo | Ast | Sck | TFL | Int | Yds | TD | Lng | PD | FF | FR | Yds | TD |
|---|---|---|---|---|---|---|---|---|---|---|---|---|---|---|---|---|---|
| 2005 | NYG | 1 | 1 | **2** | **1** | **1** | 0.0 | 0 | 0 | 0 | 0 | 0 | 0 | 0 | 0 | 0 | 0 |
| | | 5 | 1 | 2 | 1 | 1 | 0.0 | 0 | 0 | 0 | 0 | 0 | 0 | 0 | 0 | 0 | 0 |
