= Chip Vaughn =

American football player and coach (born 1985)

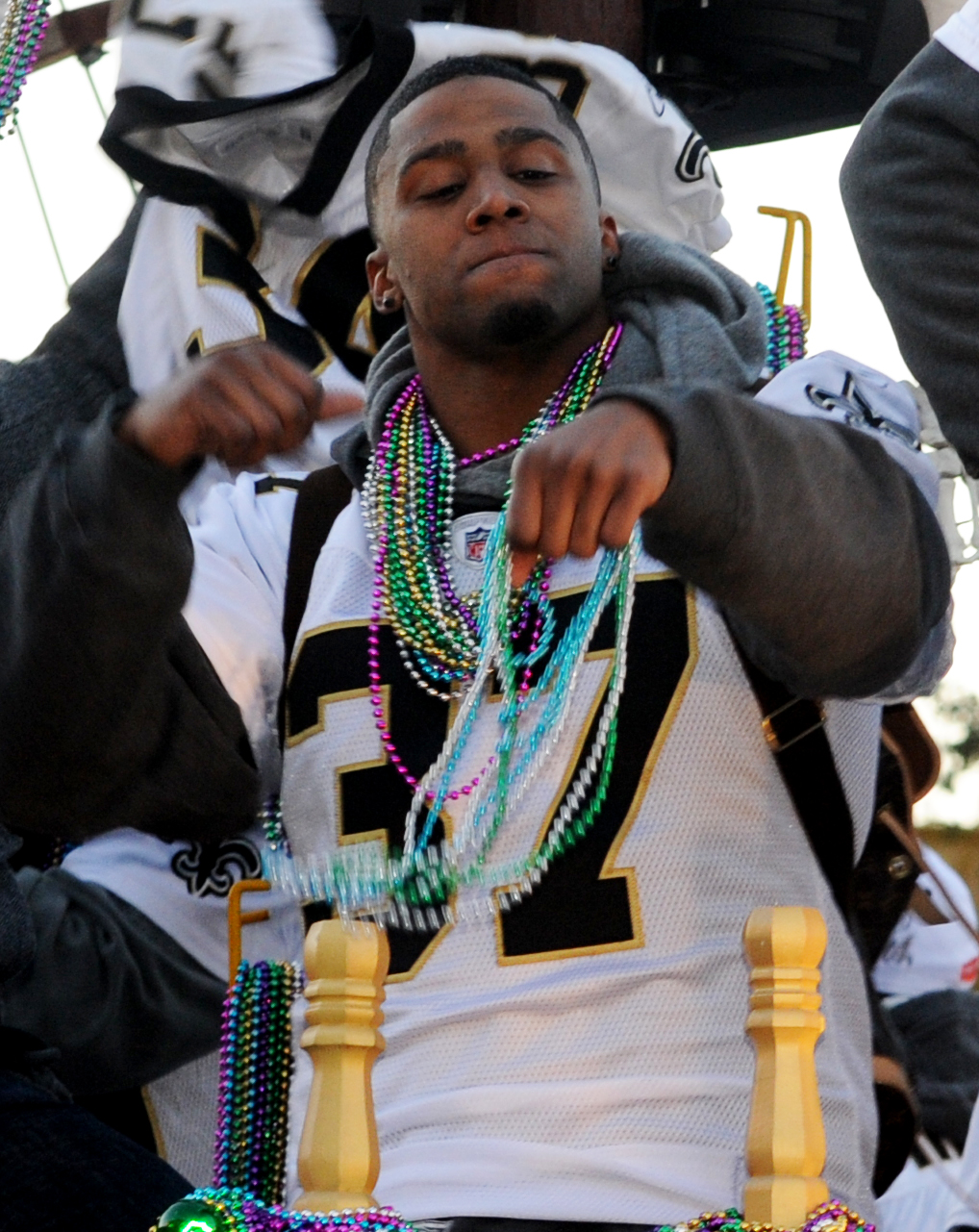
- Vaughn at the 2010 Saints Super Bowl victory parade

Morgan State
- Title: Assistant head coach & defensive coordinator

Personal information
- Born: October 26, 1985 (age 41); Goldsboro, North Carolina, U.S.
- Listed height: 6 ft 1 in (1.85 m)
- Listed weight: 218 lb (99 kg)

Career information
- High school: Robinson Secondary (Fairfax, Virginia)
- College: Wake Forest
- NFL draft: 2009: 4th round, 116th overall pick

Career history

Playing
- New Orleans Saints (2009); Philadelphia Eagles (2010)*; Indianapolis Colts (2010); Carolina Panthers (2011)*; Saskatchewan Roughriders (2013–2014)
- * Offseason or practice squad member only

Coaching
- Furr HS (TX) (2014) Defensive coordinator & secondary coach; Winston-Salem State (2015) Secondary coach & special teams coach; Fayetteville State (2016–2017) Defensive backs coach & passing game coordinator; Air Force (2018–2019) Secondary coach; New York Jets (2020–2021) Defensive assistant; Illinois (2022) Assistant director of player personnel; Lake Erie (2023) Assistant head coach & defensive coordinator; Morgan State (2024) Defensive Line Assistant

Awards and highlights
- Super Bowl champion (XLIV)

Career NFL statistics
- Total tackles: 1
- Stats at Pro Football Reference

Clarence B. "Chip" Vaughn (born October 26, 1985) is an American former professional football player who was a safety in the National Football League (NFL). He played college football for the Wake Forest Demon Deacons and was selected by the New Orleans Saints in the fourth round of the 2009 NFL draft.

Vaughn was also a member of the Philadelphia Eagles, Indianapolis Colts, Carolina Panthers, and Saskatchewan Roughriders.

== Early life ==
Vaughn played high school football at Rampart high school in Colorado Springs, Colorado, for a year then moved to Robinson Secondary School in Fairfax, Virginia.

== Professional career ==
=== New Orleans Saints ===
On April 26, 2009, Vaughn was selected by the New Orleans Saints in the fourth round (116th overall) of the 2009 NFL draft. He was placed on injured reserve and missed the entire 2009 season. He was waived on September 4, 2010.

=== Philadelphia Eagles ===
Vaughn was signed to the Philadelphia Eagles' practice squad on September 6, 2010. He was released on September 21.

=== Indianapolis Colts ===
Vaughn was signed by the Indianapolis Colts on October 25, 2010. He was waived on November 13, but re-signed on November 16. He was placed on injured reserve on November 23. Vaughn was called for two personal fouls in the last two minutes of a preseason game between the Indianapolis Colts and the Green Bay Packers on August 26, 2011. He was waived on August 28.

=== Carolina Panthers ===
Vaughn was signed to the practice squad of the Carolina Panthers on December 20, 2011.

=== Saskatchewan Roughriders ===
Vaughn signed with the Saskatchewan Roughriders on February 6, 2013. He was released on June 17, 2013.

== Coaching career ==
Vaughn was named the secondary coach at the Air Force Academy in 2018. He left after the 2019 season to join the coaching staff of the New York Jets as a defensive assistant.

He also spent short stints as the assistant director of player personnel for Illinois and Lake Erie as the assistant head coach and defensive coordinator in 2023 but was relieved of his duties following each stop. In 2024, he took an entry-level job as a defensive line assistant with Morgan State.
