= Mike Bell (running back) =

American football player (born 1983)

No. 20, 30, 40, 21, 26, 22
- Position: Running back

Personal information
- Born: April 23, 1983 (age 43); Denver, Colorado, U.S.
- Listed height: 6 ft 0 in (1.83 m)
- Listed weight: 225 lb (102 kg)

Career information
- High school: Tolleson Union (Tolleson, Arizona)
- College: Arizona (2001–2005)
- NFL draft: 2006: undrafted

Career history
- Denver Broncos (2006–2007); Houston Texans (2008)*; New Orleans Saints (2008–2009); Philadelphia Eagles (2010); Cleveland Browns (2010); Detroit Lions (2011)*
- * Offseason or practice squad member only

Awards and highlights
- Super Bowl champion (XLIV); Second-team All-Pac-10 (2003)

Career NFL statistics
- Rushing attempts: 395
- Rushing yards: 1,475
- Receptions: 33
- Receiving yards: 258
- Total touchdowns: 14
- Stats at Pro Football Reference

Michael Steven Bell (born April 23, 1983) is an American former professional football player who was a running back in the National Football League (NFL) from 2006 to 2010. He played college football for the Arizona Wildcats and was signed by the Denver Broncos as an undrafted free agent in 2006. Bell later played for the New Orleans Saints, Philadelphia Eagles, and Cleveland Browns. He had several accomplishments throughout his career, including winning Super Bowl XLIV as a member of the Saints.

== Early life ==
Bell went to Desert Horizon before playing for Tolleson Union High School a western suburb of Phoenix, where he both became the second player in Arizona history to have rushed for over 2,000 yards in back to back seasons, as well as obtaining the second-highest career total of 4,692 yards rushing in Arizona. He was named Player of the Year in his senior year by The Arizona Republic.

== College career ==
Bell played college football for the Wildcats at the University of Arizona, where he rushed for 3,163 yards and 17 touchdowns in four years, three as the starter. In his senior year, he rushed for 153 yards in sixteen attempts in a surprising 52–14 rout of the then-undefeated UCLA Bruins. Bell is third all-time in the college's history in rushing yards.

== Professional career ==
Pre-draft measurables
Height	Weight	Arm length	Hand span	40-yard dash	20-yard shuttle	Three-cone drill	Vertical jump	Broad jump	Bench press
6 ft 0 1/8 in (1.83 m)	221 lb (100 kg)	30.00 inches	9.25 inches	4.52 s	4.16 s	6.91 s	33.5 in (0.85 m)	9 ft 9 in (2.97 m)	23 reps
Height, Weight, 40-yard dash, shuttle and 3-cone drill measurements from NFL Scouting Combine.

=== Denver Broncos ===
Bell entered the 2006 NFL draft, but went undrafted. He was signed as an undrafted free agent on May 8, 2006, by the Denver Broncos.

Bell had a very strong training camp, and before the Broncos first preseason game, Bell was promoted to the starting tailback position. This promotion shocked many, as it was presumed that either Tatum Bell or Ron Dayne would win the Broncos' starting job. However Tatum Bell ended up as the starter for the first regular season game, with Mike Bell also getting carries in a backup role.

During week 8 of the 2006 season, in which the Broncos played the undefeated Indianapolis Colts, Tatum Bell was taken out with a turf toe. Mike Bell was put in and ran for 135 yards and two touchdowns in just one half, averaging nine yards per carry. He started week 9 against the Pittsburgh Steelers, but only gained 28 yards on 17 attempts. He was made inactive by coach Mike Shanahan in week 10 against the Oakland Raiders. Bell led the Broncos with eight rushing scores.

On July 21, 2008, he was released by the Broncos.

=== Houston Texans ===
Bell signed with the Houston Texans on July 31, 2008. However, he was waived on August 8.

=== New Orleans Saints ===
Bell was signed by the New Orleans Saints on November 19, 2008, after running back Aaron Stecker was placed on injured reserve, and appeared in four games during the season, totaling 13 carries for 42 yards with one touchdown. Most extensive action came at Detroit, December 21, with four carries for 26 yards and his first touchdown as a Saint, a leaping, one-yard plunge. He also added a 14-yard reception in the contest.

During the 2009 season, Bell saw more extensive action with the Saints. He was part of a three-man running back committee with Pierre Thomas and Reggie Bush. He led the team in carries with 172 and gained 654 rushing yards, good for 3.8 yards per carry. He scored 5 touchdowns. He had two carries for four yards in Super Bowl XLIV which the Saints won on February 7, 2010.

=== Philadelphia Eagles ===
On March 16, 2010, Bell was tendered an offer sheet for a one-year contract worth $1.7 million from the Philadelphia Eagles, and the Saints had the option to match the offer within seven days. The Saints did not match the offer, and Bell became a member of the Philadelphia Eagles on March 23.

=== Cleveland Browns ===
Bell was traded to the Cleveland Browns in exchange for running back Jerome Harrison on October 13, 2010.

=== Detroit Lions ===
On August 9, 2011, Bell signed with the Detroit Lions, but was waived on August 29.
