= Pierre Thomas (American football) =

American football player (born 1984)

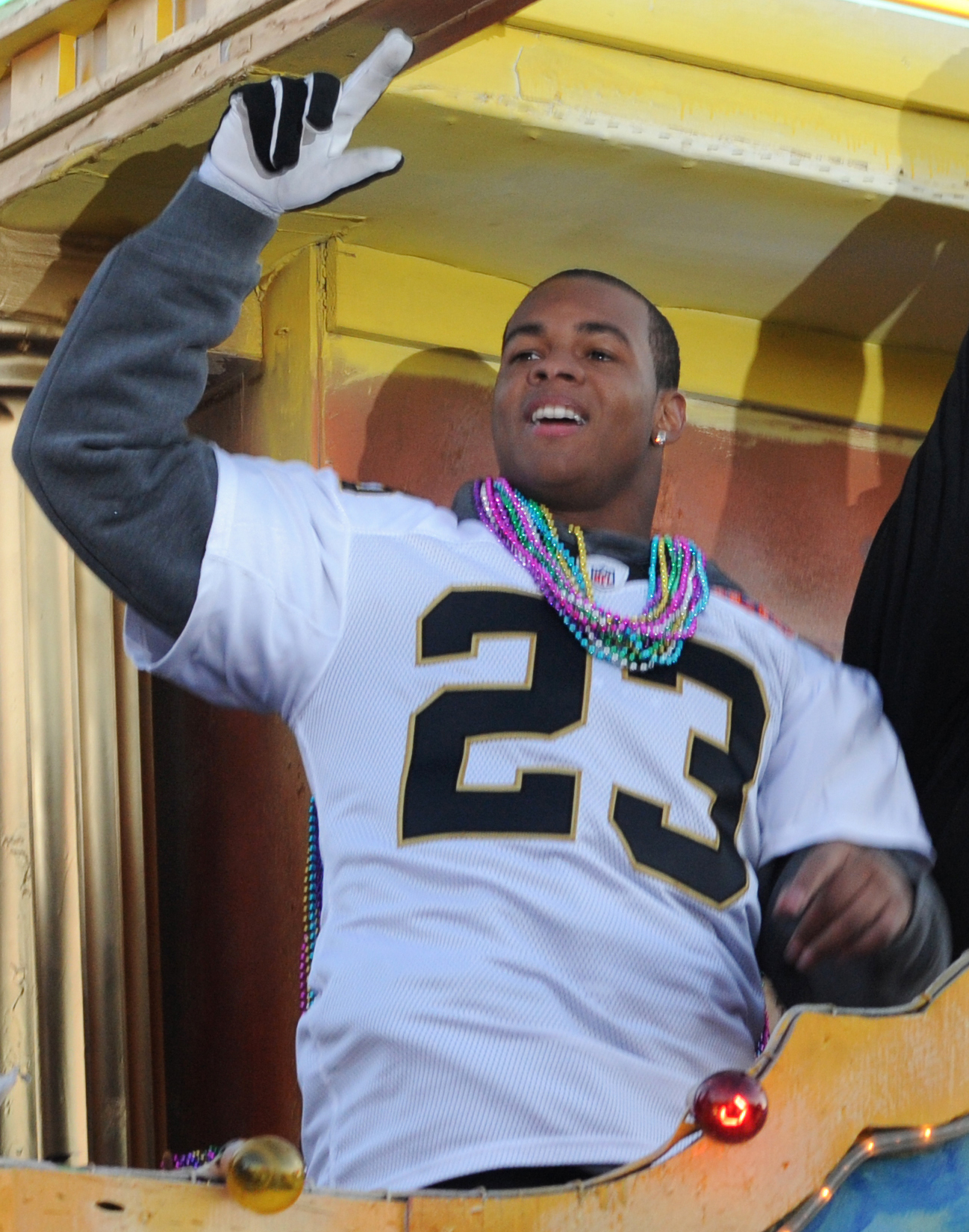
- Thomas at the New Orleans Saints Super Bowl XLIV victory parade

No. 23, 32, 39
- Position: Running back

Personal information
- Born: December 18, 1984 (age 41); Chicago, Illinois, U.S.
- Listed height: 5 ft 11 in (1.80 m)
- Listed weight: 215 lb (98 kg)

Career information
- High school: T. F. South (Lansing, Illinois)
- College: Illinois (2003–2006)
- NFL draft: 2007: undrafted

Career history
- New Orleans Saints (2007–2014); San Francisco 49ers (2015); Washington Redskins (2015)

Awards and highlights
- Super Bowl champion (XLIV); PFWA All-Rookie Team (2007); New Orleans Saints Hall of Fame

Career NFL statistics
- Rushing yards: 3,809
- Rushing average: 4.6
- Rushing touchdowns: 28
- Receptions: 336
- Receiving yards: 2,692
- Receiving touchdowns: 12
- Stats at Pro Football Reference

Charles Pierre Thomas Jr. (born December 18, 1984) is an American former professional football player who was a running back in the National Football League (NFL). He played college football for the Illinois Fighting Illini. He was signed by the New Orleans Saints as an undrafted free agent in 2007. Thomas developed into an all-around threat as a runner, pass catcher, blocker, and special teams player. He led the Saints in rushing yards in 2008 and 2009 and again in 2013, when he also led all NFL running backs in receiving yards. He became known for his excellence in executing the screen pass; it was a screen pass on which he scored the Saints' first touchdown in their 31–17 win in Super Bowl XLIV, two weeks after he had scored two touchdowns in the Saints' 2009 NFC Championship game victory.

== Early life ==
Thomas played high school football at Thornton Fractional South High School in Lansing, Illinois, where he ran for 5,565 yards and 88 touchdowns in his career. He was twice named to the all-state teams of the Chicago Tribune and Chicago Sun-Times and as a senior he was player of the year for the Champaign News-Gazette. Some of his self-taught practice for high school football included running up a steep hill with a backpack full of books on and pushing cars around.

== College career ==
He was recruited by the University of Illinois. He led the team in rushing for three seasons. In 40 games he ran for 2,545 yards (6th all-time in Illinois history) and 20 touchdowns, had 57 catches for 411 yards and 3 touchdowns, and a total of 4,451 all-purpose yards (then second all-time at Illinois). Nevertheless, he was not invited to the NFL Combine, and ultimately he was not selected in the 2007 NFL draft.

== Professional career ==
Pre-draft measurables
Height	Weight	40-yard dash	10-yard split	20-yard split	20-yard shuttle	Three-cone drill	Vertical jump	Broad jump	Bench press
5 ft 10 5/8 in (1.79 m)	209 lb (95 kg)	4.65 s	1.57 s	2.68 s	4.31 s	7.12 s	35.5 in (0.90 m)	9 ft 11 in (3.02 m)	21 reps
All values from Pro Day

=== New Orleans Saints ===
==== Brief overview ====
Thomas signed with the New Orleans Saints as an undrafted free agent, on the recommendation of special teams coach Greg McMahon, who had previously been an assistant at Illinois. He was impressive in preseason games and the Saints ultimately decided to keep him while releasing the running back they had chosen with their fourth round draft pick, Antonio Pittman.

He signed a new four-year contract before the 2011 season, and in March 2014 he signed a two-year contract extension, ending widely reported speculation that he might be released due to team salary cap problems.

==== 2007 ====
Thomas's rookie year saw him buried on the depth chart behind Reggie Bush, Deuce McAllister, and Aaron Stecker, only logging 79 touches all year. During Week 2, Thomas turned only the second touch from scrimmage of his NFL career into a 24-yard touchdown against the Saints’ longtime rival, the Atlanta Falcons. However, it was not until Week 17 against the Chicago Bears that the NFL world first witnessed the kind of production Thomas would display over the course of his NFL career. In a game that saw notable Saints’ players Bush, McAllister, Marques Colston, and Terrance Copper all sit or leave the game with injuries, Thomas was afforded the opportunity to touch the ball on 32 of the 83 offensive plays. He finished the game with 226 yards from scrimmage and the second touchdown of his career.

==== 2008 ====
After once again starting the season buried on the depth chart, a mid-season injury to Reggie Bush gave Pierre Thomas the lead-back opportunity on the NFL's highest scoring offense. During Weeks 11–16, Thomas averaged 112.8 scrimmage yards per game as the Saints went 4–2. He was named NFC Special Teams Player of the Week for Week 14. He scored at least one touchdown in all six games, including two-touchdown performances in three of them.

==== 2009 ====
After losing the majority of Week 1 to injury, Thomas got his first full-game action of the season going in Week 2 with a rushing performance that would end up as the best of his entire 9-year career. Thomas ran for 126 yards and two touchdowns on just 14 carries in a dominant 27–7 victory over the Buffalo Bills. Thomas only received more than 14 carries once more all season, but at 5.89 scrimmage yards per touch, he served as an efficient Saints’ contributor during their 13–0 start to the season. In the NFC Championship Game against the Minnesota Vikings, Thomas contributed 99 yards and two touchdowns in a narrow 31–28 overtime win that sent the Saints to Super Bowl XLIV. He produced another 85 yards and the Saints first touchdown of the game on his famous screen pass to help put the Saints in position to beat the Indianapolis Colts with a score of 31–17. This win marked the first championship in New Orleans Saints history, capping off an impressive 16–3 season and Thomas's career best 1,095 yards from scrimmage.

==== 2010–2011 ====
After losing all but 6 games of the 2010 season due to ankle injuries, Pierre Thomas bounced back in 2011 with another productive season for the 13–3 Saints. He only had two games all season with over 100 yards from scrimmage, however he still finished with 987 yards on 6.17 yards per touch. After totaling 121 yards in the NFC Wildcard Round against the Detroit Lions, Thomas's season ended earlier than expected against the San Francisco 49ers. In the NFC Divisional Round, he took a shot to the head on the 1-yard line that resulted in a concussion. The Saints lost the game 32–36 and Thomas did not see the field again until the 2012 season.

Thomas is best remembered for the Monday Night Game against Atlanta on December 26, 2011, when he placed a Christmas bow on a football then gave it to a fan as a Christmas present during a touchdown, drawing a 15-yard unsportsmanlike conduct penalty. The next day, he was fined $7,500 and an additional $5,000 for wearing red and green tape, a violation of the league's uniform policy.

==== 2012 ====
In Week 2 of the 2012 season, against the Panthers, Thomas had 143 scrimmage yards in the 35–27 loss. He had 105 carries for 473 rushing yards and one rushing touchdown to go with 39 receptions for 354 receiving yards and one receiving touchdown in 15 games and four starts in the 2012 season.

==== 2013 ====
In Week 5 of the 2013 season, against the Bears, Thomas had two receiving touchdowns in the 26–18 victory. In Week 10, against the Cowboys, he had 111 scrimmage yards, one rushing touchdown, and one receiving touchdown in the 49–17 victory. In the 2013 season, Thomas had 147 carries for 549 rushing yard and two rushing touchdowns to go with 77 receptions for 513 receiving yards and three receiving touchdowns in 16 games and nine starts.

==== 2014 ====
Thomas appeared in 11 games and started three in the 2014 season. He had 45 carries for 222 rushing yards and two rushing touchdowns to go with 45 receptions for 378 receiving yards and one receiving touchdown.

On March 4, 2015, the Saints released Thomas, making him a free agent.

=== San Francisco 49ers ===
On November 3, 2015, Thomas was signed by the San Francisco 49ers. He was cut by the 49ers on November 10, 2015, after only playing one game against the Atlanta Falcons.

=== Washington Redskins ===
On December 11, 2015, Thomas was signed by the Washington Redskins. He played in four regular season games and one postseason game with Washington.

As of the 2024 season, Pierre Thomas holds the record for the highest career catch percentage (the percentage of passes caught by a receiver when targeted) since targets began being tracked in 1992, at 84%.

== Career statistics ==
=== NFL ===
Legend
**Bold**	Career high

==== Regular season ====
Year	Team	Games		Rushing					Receiving				
Year	Team	GP	GS	Att	Yds	Avg	Lng	TD	Rec	Yds	Avg	Lng	TD
2007	NO	12	1	52	252	4.8	24	1	17	151	8.9	17	1
2008	NO	15	5	129	625	4.8	42	**9**	31	284	9.2	24	**3**
2009	NO	14	6	**147**	**793**	**5.4**	34	6	39	302	7.7	36	2
2010	NO	6	3	83	269	3.2	16	2	29	201	6.9	23	0
2011	NO	**16**	7	110	562	5.1	33	5	50	425	8.5	**57**	1
2012	NO	15	4	105	473	4.5	**48**	1	39	354	9.1	36	1
2013	NO	**16**	**9**	**147**	549	3.7	18	2	**77**	**513**	6.7	29	**3**
2014	NO	11	3	45	222	4.9	27	2	45	378	8.4	39	1
2015	SF	1	0	4	12	3.0	4	0	0	0	0.0	0	0
2015	WAS	4	0	11	52	4.7	11	0	9	84	**9.3**	15	0
Career		110	38	833	3,809	4.6	48	28	336	2,692	8.0	57	12

==== Playoffs ====
Year	Team	Games		Rushing					Receiving				
Year	Team	GP	GS	Att	Yds	Avg	Lng	TD	Rec	Yds	Avg	Lng	TD
2009	NO	**3**	**2**	**36**	**143**	4.0	12	**1**	**12**	**111**	**9.3**	**38**	**2**
2011	NO	2	1	9	72	**8.0**	**31**	**1**	7	60	8.6	14	0
2015	WAS	1	0	4	7	1.8	7	0	0	0	0.0	0	0
Career		6	3	49	222	4.5	31	2	19	171	9.0	38	2

=== College statistics ===
Year	GP–GS	Rushing						Receiving								Kick returns		
Year	GP–GS	Att	Yards	Avg	TD	Long	Avg/G	Rec	Rec–Yards	Avg	TD	Long	Avg/G	No.	Yards	Avg	TD	Long
2003	6–0	43	233	5.4	2	35	38.8	3	12	4.0	0	8	2.0	7	134	19.1	0	29
2004	11–11	152	893	5.9	8	69	81.2	14	95	6.8	1	34	8.6	25	677	27.1	1	99
2005	11–11	121	664	5.2	5	35	60.4	28	225	8.0	1	52	20.5	20	461	23.0	0	48
2006	12–11	131	755	5.8	5	62	62.9	12	79	6.6	1	23	6.6	7	223	44.6	0	75
Career	40–33	453	2,545	5.6	20	69	63.6	57	411	7.2	3	52	10.8	59	1495	25.3	1	99

== Personal life ==
Thomas was born on Chicago's South Side, the son of Charles and Greta Thomas. His parents divorced a few years later and Greta moved with her children to Lynwood, Illinois, where she worked for the United States Postal Service.

In 2013, Thomas was the Saints' team nominee for the Walter Payton NFL Man of the Year Award in acknowledgment of his extensive charitable activities, including his iCan Foundation, which fights childhood obesity.
