= Greg McMahon =

American football player and coach (born 1960)

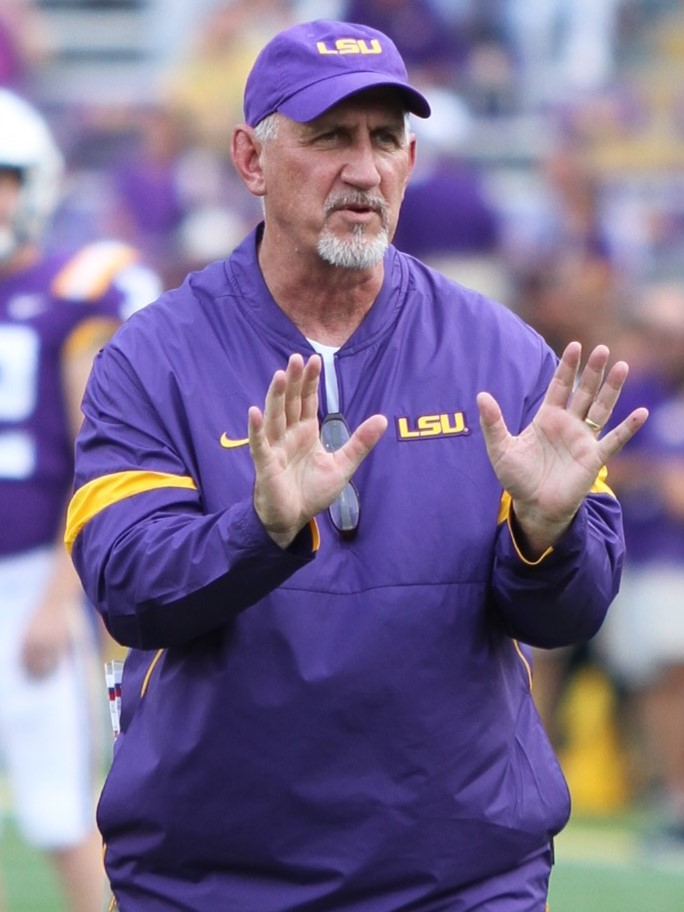

Florida Gators
- Title: Special Teams Assistant

Personal information
- Born: January 2, 1960 (age 66); Rantoul, Illinois, U.S.

Career information
- College: Eastern Illinois

Career history
- Eastern Illinois (1982) Assistant coach; Minnesota (1983–1984) Assistant coach; North Alabama (1985–1987) Assistant coach; Southern Illinois (1988) Assistant coach; Valdosta State (1989) Assistant coach; UNLV (1990–1991) Special teams coordinator, tight ends coach, & offensive tackles coach; Illinois (1992–2004); Wide receivers (1992-1996); Special teams coordinator & tight ends coach (1997-2004); East Carolina (2005) Special teams coordinator & tight ends coach; New Orleans Saints (2006–2016); Assistant special teams coordinator (2006-2007); Special teams coordinator (2008-2016); LSU (2017-2021); Special teams consultant (2017); Special teams coordinator (2018-2021); Houston Gamblers (2022) Special teams coordinator & tight ends coach; Houston Roughnecks (2023) Special teams coordinator; Tulane (2023–2024) Special teams coordinator; Florida (2026–present) Special Teams Assistant

Awards and highlights
- Super Bowl champion (XLIV); CFP national champion (2020)

Greg McMahon (born January 2, 1960) is a retired American football coach who was most recently the special teams assistant for the Florida Gators. He previously served as the special teams coordinator for Tulane Green Wave. He is the former special teams coordinator at Louisiana State University (LSU).

== Playing career ==
A native of Rantoul, Illinois, McMahon was a defensive back for Eastern Illinois, graduating in 1982.

== Coaching career ==
McMahon began his coaching career at his alma mater, Eastern Illinois, in 1982. From 1983–1984, he coached at the University of Minnesota and at the University of North Alabama from 1985–1987. He then moved on to two one-year coaching stints at Southern Illinois in 1988 and Valdosta State in 1989.

From 1990–1991, McMahon was the tight end, offensive tackle and special teams coach for the University of Nevada at Las Vegas. McMahon then spent 13 seasons (1992–2004) as an assistant coach at the University of Illinois as a wide receiver and tight end/special teams coach. He then spent one year as tight end/special teams coach at East Carolina in 2005.

=== New Orleans Saints ===
McMahon moved to the NFL as the assistant special teams coach for the New Orleans Saints from 2006–2007 and special teams coordinator from 2008–2016.

=== LSU ===
In 2017, McMahon became the special teams consultant at LSU. On January 12, 2018, he was named special teams coordinator at LSU.

McMahon retired from coaching following the 2021 season.

=== Houston Gamblers ===
On March 17, 2022, it was announced that McMahon was hired as the Special teams coordinator/Tight ends coach of the Houston Gamblers of the United States Football League.

=== Houston Roughnecks ===
On September 13, 2022, McMahon was announced as Special teams coordinator of the Houston Roughnecks of the XFL

=== Tulane ===
Following the Roughnecks season, McMahon returned to college football, joining Willie Fritz's Tulane Green Wave football staff as the special teams coordinator in May 2023.
