= 2011 New Orleans Saints season =

NFL team season

- Owner: Tom Benson
- General manager: Mickey Loomis
- Head coach: Sean Payton
- Offensive coordinator: Pete Carmichael Jr.
- Defensive coordinator: Gregg Williams
- Home stadium: Mercedes-Benz Superdome

Results
- Record: 13–3
- Division place: 1st NFC South
- Playoffs: Won Wild Card Playoffs (vs. Lions) 45–28; Lost Divisional Playoffs (at 49ers) 32–36
- All-Pros: 4: G Carl Nicks (1st team); G Jahri Evans (1st team); QB Drew Brees (2nd team); TE Jimmy Graham (2nd team)
- Pro Bowlers: 5: QB Drew Brees; TE Jimmy Graham; T Jermon Bushrod; G Jahri Evans; G Carl Nicks

Uniform
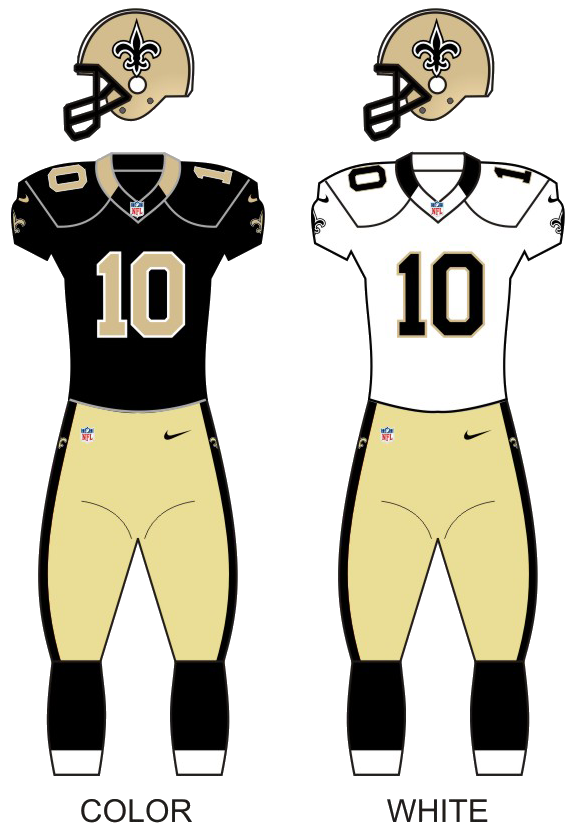

The 2011 season was the New Orleans Saints' 45th in the National Football League (NFL), their 36th playing home games at the Mercedes-Benz Superdome and their sixth under head coach Sean Payton. In Week 16, Drew Brees broke the single-season passing record previously held by Dan Marino; Brees ended the season with 5,476 passing yards, an NFL record at the time (which was broken in 2013 by Peyton Manning). The team also broke the record for offensive yards from scrimmage with 7,474 and Darren Sproles broke the record for all purpose yards, with 2,696. The Saints also finished second in scoring for total points with 547, and finished second for points per game with 34.2 points and sacks with 24.

The Saints improved on their 11–5 finish from a season earlier and won the NFC South Division with a 13–3 record, and went undefeated at home, so there was much talk of the Saints potentially winning a second Super Bowl in three seasons. Despite their impressive record, however, New Orleans failed to receive a first-round bye due to losing tiebreakers with the San Francisco 49ers for the #2 seed in the NFC behind the 15–1 Green Bay Packers. The Saints won their first playoff game against the Detroit Lions in the Wild Card round but fell to the 49ers on a last-minute touchdown in the Divisional Playoffs. The Saints finished with a final record of 14–4.

== Offseason ==
=== 2011 draft ===
Round	Selection	Player	Position	College
1	24	Cameron Jordan	DE	California
1	28 ^{[a]}	Mark Ingram II	RB	Alabama
3	72 ^{[b]}	Martez Wilson	LB	Illinois
3	88	Johnny Patrick	CB	Louisville
7	226	Greg Romeus	DE	Pittsburgh
7	243 ^{[e]}	Nate Bussey	LB	Illinois

^{^[a]} The Saints acquired this first-round selection in exchange for its second-round selection (#56 overall) and a 2012 first-round selection.
^{^[b]} The Saints acquired this third-round selection and a conditional 2012 sixth-round selection in a trade that sent OT Jammal Brown and a 2011 fifth-round selection (#155 overall) to the Washington Redskins.
^{^[c]} The Saints traded its fourth-round selection (#121 overall) to the Jacksonville Jaguars in exchange for a 2010 fifth-round selection.
^{^[d]} The Saints traded its sixth-round selection (#189 overall) to the New England Patriots in exchange for TE David Thomas.
^{^[e]} Compensatory selection.

== Staff ==
New Orleans Saints 2011 staff
Front office: Owner/president – Tom Benson; Owner/executive vice president – Rita Benson LeBlanc; Executive vice president/general manager – Mickey Loomis; Director of football administration – Khai Harley; Director of pro scouting – Ryan Pace; Director of college scouting – Rick Reiprish; Assistant director of college scouting – Brian Adams; Head coaches: Head coach – Sean Payton; Assistant head coach/linebackers – Joe Vitt; Offensive coaches: Offensive coordinator – Pete Carmichael, Jr.; Quarterbacks – Joe Lombardi; Running backs – Bret Ingalls; Wide receivers – Curtis Johnson; Tight ends – Terry Malone; Offensive line/running game – Aaron Kromer; Offensive assistant – Carter Sheridan; Offensive assistant – Frank Smith	Defensive coaches: Defensive coordinator – Gregg Williams; Defensive line – Bill Johnson; Assistant defensive line – Travis Jones; Secondary – Tony Oden; Assistant secondary – Mike Mallory; Defensive assistant – Marcus Ungaro; Defensive assistant – Blake Williams; Defensive assistant – Brian Young; Special teams coaches: Special teams coordinator – Greg McMahon; Assistant special teams – John Bonamego; Strength and conditioning: Head strength and conditioning – Dan Dalrymple; Assistant strength and conditioning – Charles Byrd; Weight room assistant – Robert Wenning

== Final roster ==
2011 New Orleans Saints roster
Quarterbacks (QB): 9 Drew Brees; 10 Chase Daniel; Running backs (RB): 45 Jed Collins FB; 35 Korey Hall FB; 28 Mark Ingram; 29 Chris Ivory; 43 Darren Sproles RS; 23 Pierre Thomas; Wide receivers (WR): 87 Adrian Arrington; 12 Marques Colston; 19 Devery Henderson; 17 Robert Meachem; 16 Lance Moore; 15 Courtney Roby; Tight ends (TE): 89 John Gilmore; 80 Jimmy Graham; 81 Michael Higgins	Offensive linemen (OL): 74 Jermon Bushrod T; 60 Brian de la Puente C; 73 Jahri Evans G; 76 Pat McQuistan T; 77 Carl Nicks G; 64 Zach Strief T; 65 Matt Tennant C; Defensive linemen (DL): 97 Jeff Charleston DE; 98 Sedrick Ellis DE; 99 Aubrayo Franklin NT; 93 Junior Galette DE; 96 Tom Johnson NT; 94 Cameron Jordan DE; 90 Turk McBride DE; 92 Shaun Rogers NT	Linebackers (LB): 52 Jonathan Casillas MLB; 56 Jo-Lonn Dunbar MLB; 54 Will Herring OLB; 53 Ramon Humber MLB; 58 Scott Shanle OLB; 91 Will Smith OLB/DE; 51 Jonathan Vilma MLB; 95 Martez Wilson OLB; Defensive backs (DB): 42 Isa Abdul-Quddus FS; 40 Jonathon Amaya SS; 33 Jabari Greer CB; 41 Roman Harper SS; 27 Malcolm Jenkins FS; 32 Johnny Patrick CB; 22 Tracy Porter CB; 21 Patrick Robinson CB; 24 Leigh Torrence CB; Special teams (ST): 47 Justin Drescher LS; 2 John Kasay K; 6 Thomas Morstead P	Practice squad: 4 Sean Canfield QB; 44 Daniel Hardy TE; 84 Tory Humphrey TE; 75 Mitch King NT; 25 Kamaal McIlwain CB; 14 Andy Tanner WR; 36 Chris Taylor RB; 70 Phil Trautwein T; 72 Fenuki Tupou G; Reserve: 71 Charles Brown T (IR); 62 Ezra Butler OLB (IR); 5 Garrett Hartley K (IR); 66 Jeremiha Hunter OLB (IR); 13 Joe Morgan WR (IR); 79 Greg Romeus DE (NF-Inj.); 85 David Thomas TE (IR); Rookies in italics 53 active, 7 reserve, 9 practice squad

== Schedule ==
=== Preseason ===
Week	Date	Opponent	Result	Record	Venue	Recap
1	August 12	San Francisco 49ers	W 24–3	1–0	Louisiana Superdome	Recap
2	August 20	at Houston Texans	L 14–27	1–1	Reliant Stadium	Recap
3	August 28	at Oakland Raiders	W 40–20	2–1	O.co Coliseum	Recap
4	September 1	Tennessee Titans	L 9–32	2–2	Louisiana Superdome	Recap

=== Regular season ===
Week	Date	Opponent	Result	Record	Venue	Recap
1	September 8	at Green Bay Packers	L 34–42	0–1	Lambeau Field	Recap
2	September 18	Chicago Bears	W 30–13	1–1	Louisiana Superdome	Recap
3	September 25	Houston Texans	W 40–33	2–1	Louisiana Superdome	Recap
4	October 2	at Jacksonville Jaguars	W 23–10	3–1	EverBank Field	Recap
5	October 9	at Carolina Panthers	W 30–27	4–1	Bank of America Stadium	Recap
6	October 16	at Tampa Bay Buccaneers	L 20–26	4–2	Raymond James Stadium	Recap
7	October 23	Indianapolis Colts	W 62–7	5–2	Mercedes-Benz Superdome	Recap
8	October 30	at St. Louis Rams	L 21–31	5–3	Edward Jones Dome	Recap
9	November 6	Tampa Bay Buccaneers	W 27–16	6–3	Mercedes-Benz Superdome	Recap
10	November 13	at Atlanta Falcons	W 26–23 (OT)	7–3	Georgia Dome	Recap
11	Bye					
12	November 28	New York Giants	W 49–24	8–3	Mercedes-Benz Superdome	Recap
13	December 4	Detroit Lions	W 31–17	9–3	Mercedes-Benz Superdome	Recap
14	December 11	at Tennessee Titans	W 22–17	10–3	LP Field	Recap
15	December 18	at Minnesota Vikings	W 42–20	11–3	Mall of America Field	Recap
16	December 26	Atlanta Falcons	W 45–16	12–3	Mercedes-Benz Superdome	Recap
17	January 1	Carolina Panthers	W 45–17	13–3	Mercedes-Benz Superdome	Recap

=== Game summaries ===
==== Week 1: at Green Bay Packers ====
Week 1: New Orleans Saints at Green Bay Packers – Game summary

Quarter	1	2	3	4	Total
Saints	7	10	10	7	34
Packers	21	7	7	7	42

at Lambeau Field, Green Bay, Wisconsin

- Date: September 8
- Game time: 7:30 p.m. CDT
- Game weather: 68 °F or 20 °C (Clear)
- Game attendance: 70,555
- Referee: Clete Blakeman
- TV announcers (NBC): Al Michaels, Cris Collinsworth and Michele Tafoya
- Gamebook

Game information

First quarter

- GB – Greg Jennings 20-yard pass from Aaron Rodgers (Mason Crosby kick), 10:08. Packers 7–0. Drive: 9 plays, 76 yards, 4:52.
- GB – Jordy Nelson 20-yard pass from Aaron Rodgers (Mason Crosby kick), 6:24. Packers 14–0. Drive: 6 plays, 36 yards, 3:05.
- NO – Robert Meachem 31-yard pass from Drew Brees (John Kasay kick), 3:31. Packers 14–7. Drive: 6 plays, 80 yards, 2:53.
- GB – Randall Cobb 32-yard pass from Aaron Rodgers (Mason Crosby kick), 0:11. Packers 21–7. Drive: 6 plays, 80 yards, 3:20.

Second quarter

- NO – John Kasay 30-yard field goal, 9:44. Packers 21–10. Drive: 14 plays, 71 yards, 5:27.
- NO – Darren Sproles 72-yard punt return (John Kasay kick), 8:37. Packers 21–17.
- GB – James Starks 17-yard run (John Kasay kick), 1:59. Packers 28–17. Drive: 14 plays, 80 yards, 6:38.

Third quarter

- NO – John Kasay 38-yard field goal, 8:40. Packers 28–20. Drive: 14 plays, 60 yards, 6:20.
- GB – Randall Cobb 108-yard kickoff return (Mason Crosby kick), 8:26. Packers 35–20. Drive: 0 plays, 0 yards, 0:14.
- NO – Devery Henderson 29-yard pass from Drew Brees (John Kasay kick), 6:54. Packers 35–27. Drive: 3 plays, 46 yards, 1:32.

Fourth quarter

- GB – John Kuhn 1-yard run (Mason Crosby kick), 11:50. Packers 42–27. Drive: 12 plays, 93 yards, 6:12.
- NO – Jimmy Graham 5-yard pass from Drew Brees (John Kasay kick), 2:15. Packers 42–34. Drive: 12 plays, 76 yards, 3:20.

Top passers

- NO – Drew Brees – 32/49, 419 yards, 3 TD
- GB – Aaron Rodgers – 27/35, 312 yards, 3 TD

Top rushers

- NO – Mark Ingram II – 13 rushes, 40 yards
- GB – James Starks – 12 rushes, 57 yards, TD

Top receivers

- NO – Lance Moore – 6 receptions, 100 yards
- GB – Greg Jennings – 7 receptions, 89 yards, TD

The Saints began their 2011 campaign at Lambeau Field, taking on the defending Super Bowl champion Green Bay Packers in the annual NFL Kickoff Game. New Orleans trailed early in the first quarter as Packers QB Aaron Rodgers completed a 7-yard touchdown pass to wide receiver Greg Jennings. The Saints answered with quarterback Drew Brees finding wide receiver Robert Meachem on a 31-yard touchdown pass, but Green Bay struck back with Rodgers completing a 32-yard touchdown pass to wide receiver Randall Cobb. New Orleans clawed their way back into the game in the second quarter with a 30-yard field goal from kicker John Kasay, followed by running back Darren Sproles returning a punt 72 yards for a touchdown. However, the Packers came right back with running back James Starks getting a 17-yard touchdown run.

The Saints led off the third quarter with Kasay's 38-yard field goal, but Green Bay replied with Cobb returning a kickoff 108 yards for a touchdown. Afterwards, New Orleans kept fighting as Brees connected with wide receiver Devery Henderson on a 29-yard touchdown pass. In the fourth quarter, the Packers replied with fullback John Kuhn getting a 1-yard touchdown run. New Orleans tried to rally as Brees found tight end Jimmy Graham on a 5-yard touchdown pass, but Green Bay's defense held stuffing a potentially game tying Ingram run on the 1-yard line on the last play of the game to preserve the win.

With the loss, the Saints began their season at 0–1.

==== Week 2: vs. Chicago Bears ====
Week 2: Chicago Bears at New Orleans Saints – Game summary

Quarter	1	2	3	4	Total
Bears	7	3	3	0	13
Saints	3	13	7	7	30

at Louisiana Superdome, New Orleans

- Date: September 18
- Game time: 12:00 pm. CDT
- Game weather: None (indoor stadium)
- Game attendance: 73,019
- Referee: Walt Coleman
- TV announcers (Fox): Joe Buck, Troy Aikman and Pam Oliver

Game information

First quarter

- CHI – Dane Sanzenbacher 8-yard pass from Jay Cutler (Robbie Gould kick), Bears 7–0
- NO – John Kasay 31-yard field goal Bears 7–3

Second quarter

- NO – Devery Henderson 79-yard pass from Drew Brees (John Kasay kick), Saints 10–7
- NO – John Kasay 29-yard field goal, Saints 13–7
- NO – John Kasay 53-yard field goal, Saints 16–7
- CHI – Robbie Gould 42-yard field goal, Saints 16–10

Third quarter

- CHI – Robbie Gould 38-yard field goal, Saints 16–13
- NO – Robert Meachem 4-yard pass from Drew Brees (John Kasay kick), Saints 23–13

Fourth quarter

- NO – Darren Sproles 12-yard pass from Drew Brees (John Kasay kick), Saints 30–13

Top passers

- CHI – Jay Cutler – 19/45, 244 yards, TD
- NO – Drew Brees – 26/37, 270 yards, 3 TD

Top rushers

- CHI – Matt Forte – 10 rushes, 49 yards
- NO – Mark Ingram II – 14 rushes, 51 yards

Top receivers

- CHI – Matt Forte – 10 receptions, 117 yards
- NO – Darren Sproles – 8 receptions, 43 yards

Coming off a loss to the Green Bay Packers, the Saints hosted the Chicago Bears in week 2. Falling early, Drew Brees responded with a 79-yard touchdown pass to Devery Henderson. The Saints defense got six sacks on Jay Cutler and wore down the Bears defense to beat them 30–13. In this rematch of the NFC Championship Game 5 seasons earlier, this was the first time in Drew Brees' career that he beat the Bears with the Saints. With the win, the Saints improved to 1–1.

==== Week 3: vs. Houston Texans ====
Week 3: Houston Texans at New Orleans Saints – Game summary

Quarter	1	2	3	4	Total
Texans	10	6	3	14	33
Saints	0	10	7	23	40

at Louisiana Superdome, New Orleans, Louisiana

- Date: September 25
- Game time: 12:00 pm. CDT
- Game weather: None (indoor stadium)
- Game attendance: 73,002
- Referee: Tony Corrente
- TV announcers (CBS): Greg Gumbel and Dan Dierdorf
- Recap

Game information

First quarter

- HOU – Owen Daniels 14-yard pass from Matt Schaub (Neil Rackers kick) Texans 7–0
- HOU – Neil Rackers 22-yard field goal Texans 10–0

Second quarter

- NO – Darren Sproles 30-yard run (John Kasay kick) Texans 10–7
- HOU – Neil Rackers 27-yard field goal Texans 13–7
- HOU – Neil Rackers 27-yard field goal Texans 16–7
- NO – John Kasay 35-yard field goal Texans 16–10

Third quarter

- NO – Robert Meachem 2-yard pass from Drew Brees (John Kasay kick) Saints 17–16
- HOU – Neil Rackers 26-yard field goal Texans 19–17

Fourth quarter

- HOU – James Casey 26-yard pass from Matt Schaub (Neil Rackers kick) Texans 26–17
- NO – Jimmy Graham 27-yard pass from Drew Brees (John Kasay kick) Texans 26–24
- NO – Lance Moore 16-yard pass from Drew Brees (Drew Brees–Lance Moore pass) Saints 32–26
- HOU – Kevin Walter 20-yard pass from Matt Schaub (Neil Rackers kick) Texans 33–32
- NO – Mark Ingram II 13-yard run (Drew Brees–Lance Moore pass) Saints 40–33

Top passers

- HOU – Matt Schaub – 22/39, 373 yards, 3 TD, INT
- NO – Drew Brees – 31/44, 370 yards, 3 TD, INT

Top rushers

- HOU – Ben Tate – 19 rushes, 82 yards
- NO – Mark Ingram II – 9 rushes, 38 yards, TD

Top receivers

- HOU – Andre Johnson – 7 receptions, 128 yards
- NO – Jimmy Graham – 4 receptions, 100 yards, TD

With the win the Saints improved to 2–1.

==== Week 4: at Jacksonville Jaguars ====
Week 4: New Orleans Saints at Jacksonville Jaguars – Game summary

Quarter	1	2	3	4	Total
Saints	7	7	6	3	23
Jaguars	0	10	0	0	10

at EverBank Field, Jacksonville, Florida

- Date: October 2
- Game time: 1:00 p.m. EDT/12:00 pm. CDT
- Game weather: Sunny, 71 °F or 21.7 °C
- Game attendance: 62,471
- Referee: Ed Hochuli
- TV announcers (Fox): Sam Rosen and Chad Pennington
- Recap

Game information

First quarter

- NO – Jed Collins 1-yard run (John Kasay kick) Saints 7–0

Second quarter

- NO – Jimmy Graham 1-yard pass from Drew Brees (John Kasay kick) Saints 14–0
- JAC – Zach Miller 14-yard pass from Blaine Gabbert (Josh Scobee kick) Saints 14–7
- JAC – Josh Scobee 31-yard field goal Jaguars 10–14

Third quarter

- NO – John Kasay 38-yard field goal Saints 17–10
- NO – John Kasay 39-yard field goal Saints 20–10

Fourth quarter

- NO – John Kasay 21-yard field goal Saints 23–10

Top passers

- NO – Drew Brees – 31/44, 351 yards, TD, 2 INT
- JAC – Blaine Gabbert – 16/42, 196 yards, TD, INT

Top rushers

- NO – Darren Sproles – 7 rushes, 75 yards
- JAC – Maurice Jones-Drew – 11 rushes, 84 yards

Top receivers

- NO – Jimmy Graham – 10 receptions, 132 yards, TD
- JAC – Mike Thomas – 11 receptions, 73 yards

With the win the Saints improved to 3–1.

==== Week 5: at Carolina Panthers ====
Week 5: New Orleans Saints at Carolina Panthers – Game summary

Quarter	1	2	3	4	Total
Saints	10	10	3	7	30
Panthers	6	7	7	7	27

at Bank of America Stadium, Charlotte, North Carolina

- Date: October 9
- Game time: 1:00 pm. EDT/12:00 pm. CDT
- Game weather: 68 °F or 20 °C (Cloudy)
- Game attendance: 72,679
- Referee: John Parry
- TV announcers (Fox): Dick Stockton and John Lynch
- Recap

Game information

First quarter

- NO – Jed Collins 1-yard pass from Drew Brees (John Kasay kick) Saints 7–0
- NO – John Kasay 23-yard field goal Saints 10–0
- CAR – Steve Smith 54-yard pass from Cam Newton (kick blocked) Saints 10–6

Second quarter

- NO – Mark Ingram II 1-yard run (John Kasay kick) Saints 17–6
- CAR – DeAngelo Williams 69-yard run (Olindo Mare kick) Saints 17–13
- NO – John Kasay 46-yard field goal Saints 20–13

Third quarter

- NO – John Kasay 37-yard field goal Saints 23–13
- CAR – Cam Newton 1-yard run (Olindo Mare kick) Saints 23–20

Fourth quarter

- CAR – Greg Olsen 5-yard pass from Cam Newton (Olindo Mare kick) Panthers 27–23
- NO – Pierre Thomas 6-yard pass from Drew Brees (John Kasay kick) Saints 30–27

Top passers

- NO – Drew Brees – 32/45, 359 yards, 2 TD, INT
- CAR – Cam Newton – 16/31, 224 yards, 2 TD, INT

Top rushers

- NO – Darren Sproles – 11 rushes, 51 yards
- CAR – DeAngelo Williams – 9 rushes, 115 yards, TD

Top receivers

- NO – Jimmy Graham – 8 receptions, 129 yards
- CAR – Steve Smith – 3 receptions, 79 yards, TD

A NFC South rivalry rookie Cam Newton and Drew Brees go head to head for the first time. After an early lead DeAngelo Williams starts a comeback with a 69-yard touchdown run. Former Carolina kicker John Kasay kicked two straight field goals, and then Cam Newton ran for a touchdown. Then, Cam Newton threw a touchdown pass to take the lead. Then, Drew Brees led the Saints down to the redzone and with less than a minute, threw a 6-yard touchdown pass to Pierre Thomas to win the game.

==== Week 6: at Tampa Bay Buccaneers ====
Week 6: New Orleans Saints at Tampa Bay Buccaneers – Game summary

Quarter	1	2	3	4	Total
Saints	7	3	3	7	20
Buccaneers	3	17	3	3	26

at Raymond James Stadium, Tampa, Florida

- Date: October 16
- Game time: 4:15 pm. EDT/3:15 pm. CDT
- Game weather: 84 °F or 28.9 °C (Cloudy)
- Game attendance: 56,590
- Referee: Jerome Boger
- TV announcers (Fox): Ron Pitts and Jim Mora
- Recap

Game information

First quarter

- TB – Connor Barth 48-yard field goal Buccaneers 3–0. Drive: 4 plays, 3 yards, 0:55.
- NO – Marques Colston 38-yard pass from Drew Brees (John Kasay kick) Saints 7–3. Drive: 6 plays, 79 yards, 2:41.

Second quarter

- TB – Arrelious Benn 65-yard pass from J.Freeman (Connor Barth kick) Buccaneers 10–7. Drive: 3 plays, 80 yards, 1:31.
- TB – Connor Barth 42-yard field goal Buccaneers 13–7. Drive: 9 plays, 66 yards, 6:12.
- TB – Preston Parker 19-yard pass from J.Freeman (Connor Barth kick) Buccaneers 20–7. Drive: 3 plays, 25 yards, 0:53.
- NO – John Kasay 33-yard field goal Saints 10–20. Drive: 6 plays, 82 yards, 0:53.

Third quarter

- NO – John Kasay 24-yard field goal Saints 13–20. Drive: 11 plays, 49 yards, 6:35.
- TB – Connor Barth 42-yard field goal Buccaneers 23–13. Drive: 6 plays, 57 yards, 2:43.

Fourth quarter

- NO – Mark Ingram II 12-yard run (John Kasay kick) Saints 20–23. Drive: 7 plays, 82 yards, 2:36.
- TB – Connor Barth 38-yard field goal Buccaneers 26–20. Drive: 8 plays, 40 yards, 2:36.

Top passers

- NO – Drew Brees – 29/45, 383 yards, TD, 3 INT
- TB – Josh Freeman – 23/41, 303 yards, 2 TD

Top rushers

- NO – Mark Ingram II – 9 rushes, 22 yards, TD
- TB – Earnest Graham – 17 rushes, 109 yards

Top receivers

- NO – Jimmy Graham – 7 receptions, 124 yards
- TB – Arrelious Benn – 3 receptions, 83 yards, TD

The Saints lose to the Buccaneers following an injury Sean Payton sustained during a sideline collision.

==== Week 7: vs. Indianapolis Colts ====
Week 7: Indianapolis Colts at New Orleans Saints – Game summary

Quarter	1	2	3	4	Total
Colts	0	7	0	0	7
Saints	21	13	14	14	62

at Mercedes-Benz Superdome, New Orleans, Louisiana

- Date: October 23
- Game time: 7:20 pm. CDT
- Game weather: None (indoor stadium)
- Game attendance: 73,012
- Referee: Scott Green
- TV announcers (NBC): Al Michaels, Cris Collinsworth and Michele Tafoya
- Gamebook

Game information

First quarter

- NO – Marques Colston 14-yard pass from Drew Brees (John Kasay kick), 9:02. Saints 7–0. Drive: 6 plays, 41 yards, 2:59.
- NO – Marques Colston 4-yard pass from Drew Brees (John Kasay kick), 5:31. Saints 14–0. Drive: 6 plays, 81 yards, 1:39.
- NO – Darren Sproles 6-yard pass from Drew Brees (John Kasay kick), 0:42. Saints 21–0. Drive: 8 plays, 52 yards, 3:42.

Second quarter

- NO – Jed Collins 1-yard run (John Kasay kick), 10:39. Saints 28–0. Drive: 7 plays, 69 yards, 3:51.
- NO – John Kasay 23-yard field goal, 4:20. Saints 31–0. Drive: 11 plays, 53 yards, 5:28.
- IND – Delone Carter 2-yard run (Adam Vinatieri kick) 1:56. Saints 31–7. Drive: 7 plays, 80 yards, 2:24.
- NO – John Kasay 47-yard field goal, 0:00. Saints 34–7. Drive: 7 plays, 52 yards, 1:56.

Third quarter

- NO – Jimmy Graham 4-yard pass from Drew Brees (John Kasay kick), 9:16. Saints 41–7. Drive: 10 plays, 75 yards, 5:44.
- NO – Jimmy Graham 2-yard pass from Drew Brees (John Kasay kick), 1:41. Saints 48–7. Drive: 11 plays, 60 yards, 6:05.

Fourth quarter

- NO – Darren Sproles 16-yard run (John Kasay kick), 12:26. Saints 55–7. Drive: 6 plays, 58 yards, 2:58.
- NO – Leigh Torrence 42-yard interception return (John Kasay kick), 12:12. Saints 62–7.

Top passers

- IND – Curtis Painter – 9/17, 67 yards, INT
- NO – Drew Brees – 31/35, 325 yards, 5 TD

Top rushers

- IND – Delone Carter – 10 rushes, 89 yards, TD
- NO – Mark Ingram II – 14 rushes, 91 yards

Top receivers

- IND – Reggie Wayne – 3 receptions, 36 yards
- NO – Marques Colston – 7 receptions, 98 yards, 2 TD

The Saints hosted the Colts in a rematch of Super Bowl XLIV. With the win, The Saints improved to 5–2 In a game against the currently winless Indianapolis Colts (0–7), the Saints began the game with recovering a fumbled snap by Curtis Painter. The Saints would convert that turnover into a touchdown with a 14-yard pass from Drew Brees to Marques Colston. The Saints would continue again with a 4-yard TD pass from Drew Brees to Marques Colston. Then Delone Carter fumbled and the Saints recovered for their second fumble recovery of the game, and their next TD of the night came with a 6-yard pass from Brees to Darren Sproles, as the Saints convert another turnover into points begin the game and end the first quarter 21–0. The Saints would continue with a Jed Collins 1-yard run and a field goal, but the Colts would score with a Delone Carter 2-yard run. The Saints would end the first half with another John Kasay field goal. The Saints would outscore the Colts 28–0 in the second half, with the Saints outscoring the Colts 14–0 in each of the second half quarters. Drew Brees would throw a 4-yard and a 2-yard TD pass to Jimmy Graham. In the fourth quarter, Darren Sproles ran 16 yards for a TD, and with under 13 minutes left in the fourth quarter, Leigh Torrence intercepted a pass from Curtis Painter and returned it 42 yards for a touchdown as the Saints ousted the Colts 62–7 and won the game with the most points in a single game in franchise history. Drew Brees finished the game 31/35 for 325 yards and 5 touchdowns with no interceptions. The Saints also rushed for 236 yards with 2 touchdowns, with Mark Ingram's 91 yards, Darren Sproles' 88 yards and Pierre Thomas' 57 yards. The New Orleans Saints offense gained 557 yards of total offense, and ran 73 plays, and gained 36 first downs and was also 6/8 in third-down efficiency. This stands as the largest win in Saints history.

==== Week 8: at St. Louis Rams ====
Week 8: New Orleans Saints at St. Louis Rams – Game summary

Quarter	1	2	3	4	Total
Saints	0	0	7	14	21
Rams	0	17	7	7	31

at Edward Jones Dome, St. Louis, Missouri

- Date: October 30
- Game time: 12:00 pm. CDT
- Game weather: None (indoor stadium)
- Game attendance: 57,179
- Referee: Walt Anderson
- TV announcers (Fox): Chris Myers and Tim Ryan
- Recap

Game information

First quarter

- No scoring plays.

Second quarter

- STL – Josh Brown 38-yard field goal. Rams 3–0. Drive: 14 plays, 68 yards, 5:41.
- STL – Steven Jackson 3-yard run (Josh Brown kick). Rams 10–0. Drive: 2 plays, 15 yards, 0:26.
- STL – Brandon Lloyd 8-yard pass from A. J. Feeley (Josh Brown kick). Rams 17–0. Drive: 7 plays, 38 yards, 0:41.

Third quarter

- STL – Steven Jackson 3-yard run (Josh Brown kick). Rams 24–0. Drive: 11 plays, 73 yards, 5:44.
- NO – Jonathan Vilma fumble recovery in the end zone (John Kasay kick). Saints 7–24.

Fourth quarter

- NO – Pierre Thomas 3-yard run (J. Kasay kick). Saints 14–24. Drive: 10 plays, 68 yards, 4:45.
- STL – Darian Stewart 27-yard interception return (Josh Brown kick). Rams 31–14.
- NO – Lance Moore 8-yard pass from Drew Brees (John Kasay kick). Saints 21–31. Drive: 15 plays, 80 yards, 2:45.

Top passers

- NO – Drew Brees – 30/44, 269 yards, TD, 2 INT
- STL – A. J. Feeley – 20/37, 175 yards, TD

Top rushers

- NO – Pierre Thomas – 7 rushes, 23 yards, TD
- STL – Steven Jackson – 25 rushes, 159 yards, 2 TD

Top receivers

- NO – Lance Moore – 7 receptions, 74 yards, TD
- STL – Brandon Lloyd – 6 receptions, 53 yards, TD

After a franchise record setting performance the Saints went to face another winless team, the St. Louis Rams. This time, however, the Rams pulled off one of the biggest upsets in this NFL season, as their defense kept the Saints scoreless during the first half, and then the Rams sealed the deal with a 27-yard interception return for. With this defeat the Saints fell to 5–3, however this would be the last time the Saints would lose in the regular season.

==== Week 9: vs. Tampa Bay Buccaneers ====
Week 9: Tampa Bay Buccaneers at New Orleans Saints – Game summary

Quarter	1	2	3	4	Total
Buccaneers	0	3	3	10	16
Saints	7	10	7	3	27

at Mercedes-Benz Superdome, New Orleans, Louisiana

- Date: November 6
- Game time: 12:00 pm. CST
- Game weather: None (indoor stadium)
- Game attendance: 73,043
- Referee: Carl Cheffers
- TV announcers (Fox): Dick Stockton and John Lynch

Game information

First quarter

- NO – Lance Moore 3-yard pass from Drew Brees (John Kasay kick) Saints 7–0. Drive: 5 plays, 66 yards, 2:40.

Second quarter

- NO – Darren Sproles 21-yard pass from Drew Brees (John Kasay kick) Saints 14–0. Drive: 6 plays, 80 yards, 3:35.
- TB – Connor Barth 40-yard field goal Saints 14–3. Drive: 5 plays, 53 yards, 0:58.
- NO – John Kasay 21-yard field goal Saints 17–3. Drive: 9 plays, 76 yards, 1:39.

Third quarter

- TB – Connor Barth 48-yard field goal Saints 17–6. Drive: 6 plays, 3 yards, 3:03.
- NO – Pierre Thomas 9-yard run (John Kasay kick) Saints 24–6. Drive: 12 plays, 76 yards, 6:18.

Fourth quarter

- TB – Connor Barth 25-yard field goal Saints 24–9. Drive: 15 plays, 73 yards, 7:03.
- TB – Kellen Winslow 5-yard pass from Josh Freeman (Connor Barth kick) Saints 24–16. Drive: 15 plays, 73 yards, 7:03.
- NO – John Kasay 34-yard field goal Saints 27–16. Drive: 11 plays, 63 yards, 4:16.

Top passers

- NO – Drew Brees – 27/36, 258 yards, 2 TD, INT
- TB – Josh Freeman – 27/37, 281 yards, TD

Top rushers

- TB – LeGarrette Blount – 13 rushes, 72 yards
- NO – Chris Ivory – 15 rushes, 67 yards

Top receivers

- TB – Preston Parker – 3 receptions, 56 yards
- NO – Jimmy Graham – 6 receptions, 78 yards

==== Week 10: at Atlanta Falcons ====
Week 10: New Orleans Saints at Atlanta Falcons – Game summary

Quarter	1	2	3	4	OT	Total
Saints	3	7	7	6	3	26
Falcons	3	3	7	10	0	23

at Georgia Dome, Atlanta

- Date: November 13
- Game time: 12:00 pm. CST
- Game weather: None (indoor stadium)
- Game attendance: 70,359
- Referee: Terry McAulay
- TV announcers (Fox): Kenny Albert, Daryl Johnston and Tony Siragusa
- Recap

Game information

First quarter

- ATL – Matt Bryant 36-yard field goal Falcons 3–0. Drive: 16 plays, 61 yards, 8:40.
- NO – John Kasay 52-yard field goal Saints 3–3. Drive: 8 plays, 30 yards, 3:32.

Second quarter

- ATL – Matt Bryant 29-yard field goal Falcons 6–3. Drive: 9 plays, 45 yards, 5:21.
- NO – Jimmy Graham 21-yard pass from Drew Brees (John Kasay kick) Saints 10–6. Drive: 3 plays, 50 yards, 1:01.

Third quarter

- ATL – Jason Snelling 21-yard pass from Matt Ryan (Matt Bryant kick) Falcons 13–10. Drive: 10 plays, 70 yards, 6:04.
- NO – Robert Meachem 33-yard pass from Drew Brees (John Kasay kick) Saints 17–13. Drive: 7 plays, 82 yards, 3:37.

Fourth quarter

- NO – John Kasay 48-yard field goal Saints 20–13. Drive: 6 plays, −4 yards, 2:56.
- NO – John Kasay 44-yard field goal Saints 23–13. Drive: 8 plays, 62 yards, 3:35.
- ATL – Tony Gonzalez 20-yard pass from Matt Ryan (Matt Bryant kick) Falcons 23-20. Drive: 9 plays, 81 yards, 3:00.
- ATL – Matt Bryant 27-yard field goal Falcons 23–23. Drive: 13 plays, 85 yards, 1:55.

Overtime

- NO – John Kasay 26-yard field goal Saints 26–23. Drive: 4 plays, 21 yards, 2:21.

Top passers

- NO – Drew Brees – 30/43, 322 yards, 2 TD
- ATL – Matt Ryan – 29/52, 351 yards, 2 TD, INT

Top rushers

- NO – Pierre Thomas – 6 rushes, 29 yards
- ATL – Michael Turner – 22 rushes, 96 yards

Top receivers

- NO – Marques Colston – 8 receptions, 113 yards
- ATL – Harry Douglas – 8 receptions, 133 yards

==== Week 12: vs. New York Giants ====
Week 12: New York Giants at New Orleans Saints – Game summary

Quarter	1	2	3	4	Total
Giants	0	3	7	14	24
Saints	0	21	14	14	49

at Mercedes-Benz Superdome, New Orleans, Louisiana

- Date: November 28
- Game time: 7:30 pm. CST
- Game weather: None (indoor stadium)
- Game attendance: 73,068
- Referee: Gene Steratore
- TV announcers (ESPN): Mike Tirico, Ron Jaworski, Jon Gruden and Wendi Nix
- Recap

Game information

First quarter

- No scoring plays.

Second quarter

- NO – Lance Moore 4-yard pass from Drew Brees (John Kasay kick) Saints 7–0. Drive: 10 plays, 80 yards, 4:35.
- NYG – Lawrence Tynes 42-yard field goal Giants 3–7. Drive: 9 plays, 46 yards, 5:22.
- NO – Jimmy Graham 5-yard pass from Drew Brees (John Kasay kick) Saints 14–3. Drive: 7 plays, 80 yards, 3:00.
- NO – Lance Moore 10-yard pass from Drew Brees (John Kasay kick) Saints 21–3. Drive: 6 plays, 88 yards, 0:34.

Third quarter

- NYG – Brandon Jacobs 8-yard run (Lawrence Tynes kick) Giants 10–21. Drive: 6 plays, 67 yards, 4:17.
- NO – Drew Brees 8-yard run (John Kasay kick) Saints 28–10. Drive: 9 plays, 73 yards, 4:55.
- NO – Jimmy Graham 29-yard pass from Drew Brees (John Kasay kick) Saints 35–10. Drive: 2 plays, 29 yards, 0:13.

Fourth quarter

- NYG – Victor Cruz 72-yard pass from Eli Manning (Lawrence Tynes kick) Giants 17–35. Drive: 3 plays, 84 yards, 1:21.
- NO – Pierre Thomas 12-yard run (John Kasay kick) Saints 42–17. Drive: 9 plays, 80 yards, 4:09.
- NYG – Victor Cruz 4-yard pass from Eli Manning (Lawrence Tynes kick) Giants 24–42. Drive: 12 plays, 80 yards, 5:29.
- NO – Mark Ingram II 35-yard run (John Kasay kick) Saints 49–24. Drive: 3 plays, 40 yards, 1:01.

Top passers

- NO – Drew Brees – 24/38, 363 yards, 4 TD
- NYG – Eli Manning – 33/47, 406 yards, 2 TD, INT

Top rushers

- NO – Mark Ingram II – 13 rushes, 80 yards, TD
- NYG – Brandon Jacobs – 13 rushes, 46 yards, TD

Top receivers

- NO – Jimmy Graham – 5 receptions, 84 yards, 2 TD
- NYG – Victor Cruz – 9 receptions, 157 yards, 2 TD

==== Week 13: vs. Detroit Lions ====
Week 13: Detroit Lions at New Orleans Saints – Game summary

Quarter	1	2	3	4	Total
Lions	0	7	10	0	17
Saints	3	21	0	7	31

at Mercedes-Benz Superdome, New Orleans, Louisiana

- Date: December 4
- Game time: 7:20 pm. CST
- Game weather: Played indoors (domed stadium)
- Game attendance: 73,042
- Referee: Clete Blakeman
- TV announcers (NBC): Al Michaels, Cris Collinsworth and Michele Tafoya
- Recap
  Gamebook

Game information

First quarter

- NO – John Kasay 39-yard field goal, Saints 3–0, Drive: 13 plays, 37 yards, 5:08.

Second quarter

- NO – Mark Ingram II 14-yard run (John Kasay kick), Saints 10–0, Drive: 9 plays, 93 yards, 4:08.
- NO – Robert Meachem 67-yard pass from Drew Brees (John Kasay kick), Saints 17–0, Drive: 2 plays, 75 yards, 0:17.
- DET – Kevin Smith 2-yard run (Jason Hanson kick), Saints 17–7, Drive: 10 plays, 80 yards, 5:35.
- NO – Lance Moore 20-yard pass from Drew Brees (John Kasay kick), Saints 24–7, Drive: 8 plays, 51 yards, 1:53.

Third quarter

- DET – Jason Hanson 31-yard field goal, Saints 24–10, Drive: 11 plays, 86 yards, 5:27.
- DET – Maurice Morris 9-yard pass from Matthew Stafford (Jason Hanson kick), Saints 24–17, Drive: 9 plays, 92 yards, 5:30.

Fourth quarter

- NO – Darren Sproles 6-yard pass from Drew Brees (John Kasay kick), Saints 31–17, Drive: 7 plays, 55 yards, 2:49.

Top passers

- DET – Matthew Stafford – 31/44, 408 yards, TD, INT
- NO – Drew Brees − 26/36, 342 yards, 3 TD

Top rushers

- DET – Kevin Smith – 6 rushes, 34 yards, TD
- NO – Mark Ingram II – 16 rushes, 34 yards, TD

Top receivers

- DET – Nate Burleson – 5 receptions, 93 yards
- NO – Robert Meachem – 3 receptions, 119 yards, TD

==== Week 14: at Tennessee Titans ====
Week 14: New Orleans Saints at Tennessee Titans – Game summary

Quarter	1	2	3	4	Total
Saints	3	3	3	13	22
Titans	0	3	7	7	17

at LP Field, Nashville, Tennessee

- Date: December 11
- Game time: 12:00 pm. CST
- Game weather: 41 °F or 5 °C (Sunny and cool)
- Game attendance: 69,143
- Referee: Mike Carey
- TV announcers (Fox): Joe Buck, Troy Aikman and Pam Oliver
- Recap

Game information

First quarter

- NO – John Kasay 25-yard field goal Saints 3–0. Drive: 10 plays, 72 yards, 5:06.

Second quarter

- TEN – Rob Bironas 43-yard field goal Titans 3–3. Drive: 5 plays, 32 yards, 2:11.
- NO – John Kasay 29-yard field goal Saints 6–3. Drive: 9 plays, 58 yards, 2:51.

Third quarter

- NO – John Kasay 22-yard field goal Saints 9–3. Drive: 15 plays, 86 yards, 8:00.
- TEN – Jake Locker 6-yard run (Rob Bironas kick) Titans 10–9. Drive: 8 plays, 40 yards, 2:36.

Fourth quarter

- NO – Marques Colston 35-yard pass from Drew Brees (John Kasay kick) Saints 16–10. Drive: 9 plays, 72 yards, 4:40.
- NO – Marques Colston 28-yard pass from Drew Brees (run failed) Saints 22–10. Drive: 7 plays, 50 yards, 3:59.
- TEN – Nate Washington 40-yard pass from Jake Locker (Rob Bironas kick) Saints 22–17. Drive: 3 plays, 65 yards, 1:03.

Top passers

- NO – Drew Brees – 36/47, 337 yards, 2 TD
- TEN – Jake Locker – 13/29, 282 yards, TD

Top rushers

- NO – Chris Ivory – 13 rushes, 53 yards
- TEN – Jake Locker – 6 rushes, 36 yards, TD

Top receivers

- NO – Marques Colston – 7 receptions, 105 yards, 2 TD
- TEN – Nate Washington – 6 receptions, 130 yards, TD

==== Week 15: at Minnesota Vikings ====
Week 15: New Orleans Saints at Minnesota Vikings – Game summary

Quarter	1	2	3	4	Total
Saints	7	14	14	7	42
Vikings	3	10	0	7	20

at Mall of America Field at Hubert H. Humphrey Metrodome, Minneapolis, Minnesota

- Date: December 18
- Game time: 12:00 pm. CST
- Game weather: None (indoor stadium)
- Game attendance: 62,623
- Referee: Walt Anderson
- TV announcers (Fox): Dick Stockton, John Lynch and Jennifer Hale
- Recap

Game information

First quarter

- MIN – Ryan Longwell 44-yard field goal Vikings 3–0. Drive: 4 plays, 0 yards, 1:20.
- NO – Lance Moore 5-yard pass from Drew Brees (John Kasay kick) Saints 7–3. Drive: 10 plays, 84 yards, 5:36.

Second quarter

- MIN – Ryan Longwell 49-yard field goal Vikings 6–7. Drive: 4 plays, −10 yards, 1:09.
- NO – Jimmy Graham 1-yard pass from Drew Brees (John Kasay kick) Saints 14–6. Drive: 5 plays, 80 yards, 3:09.
- MIN – Toby Gerhart 10-yard pass from Christian Ponder (Ryan Longwell kick) Vikings 13–14. Drive: 6 plays, 61 yards, 3:05.
- NO – Darren Sproles 13-yard pass from Drew Brees (John Kasay kick) Saints 21–13. Drive: 13 plays, 76 yards, 5:26.

Third quarter

- NO – John Gilmore 2-yard pass from Drew Brees (John Kasay kick) Saints 28–13. Drive: 4 plays, 44 yards, 1:44.
- NO – Lance Moore 47-yard pass from Drew Brees (John Kasay kick) Saints 35–13. Drive: 3 plays, 53 yards, 0:56.

Fourth quarter

- NO – Pierre Thomas 1-yard run (John Kasay kick) Saints 42–13. Drive: 19 plays, 87 yards, 10:36.
- MIN – Toby Gerhart 16-yard pass from Christian Ponder (Ryan Longwell kick) Vikings 20–42. Drive: 6 plays, 60 yards, 2:13.

Top passers

- NO – Drew Brees – 32/40, 412 yards, 5 TD
- MIN – Christian Ponder – 14/31, 120 yards, 2 TD, INT

Top rushers

- NO – Chris Ivory – 18 rushes, 74 yards
- MIN – Adrian Peterson – 10 rushes, 60 yards

Top receivers

- NO – Lance Moore – 5 receptions, 91 yards, 2 TD
- MIN – Toby Gerhart – 4 receptions, 46 yards, 2 TD

==== Week 16: vs. Atlanta Falcons ====
Week 16: Atlanta Falcons at New Orleans Saints – Game summary

Quarter	1	2	3	4	Total
Falcons	10	0	3	3	16
Saints	7	14	10	14	45

at Mercedes-Benz Superdome, New Orleans, Louisiana

- Date: December 26
- Game time: 7:30 pm. CST
- Game weather: None (indoor stadium)
- Game attendance: 70,086
- Referee: Jeff Triplette
- TV announcers (ESPN): Mike Tirico, Ron Jaworski, Jon Gruden and Suzy Kolber
- Recap

Game information

First quarter

- ATL – Matt Bryant 34-yard field goal Falcons 3–0. Drive: 11 plays, 64 yards, 6:07.
- NO – Pierre Thomas 4-yard run (John Kasay kick) Saints 7–3. Drive: 8 plays, 84 yards, 3:28.
- ATL – Julio Jones 21-yard pass from Matt Ryan (Matt Bryant kick) Falcons 10–7. Drive: 8 plays, 72 yards, 3:54.

Second quarter

- NO – Marques Colston 8-yard pass from Drew Brees (John Kasay kick) Saints 14–10. Drive: 10 plays, 81 yards, 3:59.
- NO – Jimmy Graham 9-yard pass from Drew Brees (John Kasay kick) Saints 21–10. Drive: 10 plays, 80 yards, 1:55.

Third quarter

- NO – Robert Meachem 24-yard pass from Drew Brees (John Kasay kick) Saints 28–10. Drive: 6 plays, 86 yards, 3:15.
- ATL – Matt Bryant 51-yard field goal Falcons 13–28. Drive: 5 plays, 47 yards, 3:47.
- NO – John Kasay 29-yard field goal Saints 31–13. Drive: 4 plays, 3 yards, 1:37.

Fourth quarter

- ATL – Matt Bryant 30-yard field goal Falcons 16–31. Drive: 16 plays, 68 yards, 5:21.
- NO – Malcolm Jenkins 30-yard fumble return (John Kasay kick) Saints 38–16.
- NO – Darren Sproles 9-yard pass from Drew Brees (John Kasay kick) Saints 45–16. Drive: 6 plays, 33 yards, 2:17.

Top passers

- NO – Drew Brees – 23/39, 307 yards, 4 TD, 2 INT
- ATL – Matt Ryan – 34/52, 373 yards, TD

Top rushers

- NO – Darren Sproles – 5 rushes, 67 yards
- ATL – Michael Turner – 11 rushes, 39 yards

Top receivers

- NO – Marques Colston – 7 receptions, 81 yards, TD
- ATL – Julio Jones – 8 receptions, 128 yards, TD

During this game, Drew Brees set the record for most passing yards in a season, breaking the previous record set by Dan Marino.

==== Week 17: vs. Carolina Panthers ====
Week 17: Carolina Panthers at New Orleans Saints – Game summary

Quarter	1	2	3	4	Total
Panthers	7	10	0	0	17
Saints	14	10	14	7	45

at Mercedes-Benz Superdome, New Orleans, Louisiana

- Date: January 1
- Game time: 12:00 pm. CST
- Game weather: None (indoor stadium)
- Game attendance: 73,065
- Referee: Ed Hochuli
- TV announcers (Fox): Joe Buck, Troy Aikman and Pam Oliver
- Recap

Game information

First quarter

- NO – Chris Ivory 35-yard run (John Kasay kick) Saints 7–0. Drive: 4 plays, 80 yards, 1:39.
- CAR – Steve Smith 12-yard pass from C.Newton (Olindo Mare kick) Panthers 7–7. Drive: 11 plays, 80 yards, 6:39.
- NO – Marques Colston 15-yard pass from Drew Brees (John Kasay kick) Saints 14–7. Drive: 9 plays, 83 yards, 3:52.

Second quarter

- CAR – Olindo Mare 41-yard field goal Panthers 10–14. Drive: 6 plays, 13 yards, 2:31.
- NO – John Kasay 43-yard field goal Saints 17–10. Drive: 9 plays, 55 yards, 3:08.
- CAR – Jonathan Stewart 29-yard run (Olindo Mare kick) Panthers 17–17. Drive: 5 plays, 80 yards, 1:24.
- NO – Marques Colston 42-yard pass from Drew Brees (John Kasay kick) Saints 24–17. Drive: 6 plays, 81 yards, 1:11.

Third quarter

- NO – Jimmy Graham 19-yard pass from Drew Brees (John Kasay kick) Saints 31–17. Drive: 6 plays, 61 yards, 3:28.
- NO – Jed Collins 1-yard pass from Drew Brees (John Kasay kick) Saints 38–17. Drive: 7 plays, 44 yards, 3:23.

Fourth quarter

- NO – Darren Sproles 9-yard pass from Drew Brees (John Kasay kick) Saints 45–17. Drive: 7 plays, 68 yards, 3:50.

Top passers

- NO – Drew Brees – 28/35, 389 yards, 5 TD, INT
- CAR – Cam Newton – 15/25, 158 yards, TD, INT

Top rushers

- NO – Chris Ivory – 19 rushes, 127 yards, TD
- CAR – Jonathan Stewart – 9 rushes, 79 yards, TD

Top receivers

- NO – Marques Colston – 7 receptions, 145 yards, 2 TD
- CAR – Steve Smith – 6 receptions, 86 yards, TD

=== Standings ===
NFC South
	W	L	T	PCT	DIV	CONF	PF	PA	STK
^{(3)} New Orleans Saints	13	3	0	.813	5–1	9–3	547	339	W8
^{(5)} Atlanta Falcons	10	6	0	.625	3–3	7–5	402	350	W1
Carolina Panthers	6	10	0	.375	2–4	3–9	406	429	L1
Tampa Bay Buccaneers	4	12	0	.250	2–4	3–9	287	494	L10

== Postseason ==
=== Schedule ===
Playoff round	Date	Opponent (seed)	Result	Record	Game site	NFL.com recap
Wild Card	January 7	Detroit Lions (6)	W 45–28	1–0	Mercedes-Benz Superdome	Recap
Divisional	January 14	at San Francisco 49ers (2)	L 32–36	1–1	Candlestick Park	Recap

=== Game summaries ===
==== NFC Wild Card Playoff Game: vs. #6 Detroit Lions ====
NFC Wild Card Playoff Game: Detroit Lions at New Orleans Saints – Game summary

Quarter	1	2	3	4	Total
Lions	7	7	7	7	28
Saints	0	10	14	21	45

at Mercedes-Benz Superdome, New Orleans, Louisiana

- Date: January 7, 2012
- Game time: 7:00 p.m. CST
- Game weather: Played indoors (domed stadium)
- Game attendance: 73,038
- Referee: Tony Corrente
- TV announcers (NBC): Al Michaels, Cris Collinsworth and Michele Tafoya
- Recap

Game information

First quarter

- DET – Will Heller 10-yard pass from Matthew Stafford (Jason Hanson kick), 10:58. Lions 7–0. Drive: 8 plays, 80 yards, 4:02.

Second quarter

- NO – Darren Sproles 2-yard run (John Kasay kick), 14:01. Tied 7–7. Drive: 11 plays, 89 yards, 5:19.
- DET – Calvin Johnson 13-yard pass from Matthew Stafford (Jason Hanson kick), 9:11. Lions 14–7. Drive 9 plays, 87 yards, 4:50.
- NO – John Kasay 24-yard field goal, 0:00. Lions 14–10. Drive 14 plays, 78 yards, 5:03.

Third quarter

- NO – Devery Henderson 41-yard pass from Drew Brees (John Kasay kick), 13:09. Saints 17–14. Drive: 4 plays, 78 yards, 1:51.
- NO – Jimmy Graham 3-yard pass from Drew Brees (John Kasay kick), 4:03. Saints 24–14. Drive: 13 plays, 92 yards, 6:27.
- DET – Matthew Stafford 1-yard run (Jason Hanson kick), 1:08. Saints 24–21. Drive 8 plays, 80 yards, 2:55.

Fourth quarter

- NO – Darren Sproles 17-yard run (John Kasay kick), 9:53. Saints 31–21. Drive: 14 plays, 80 yards, 6:15.
- NO – Robert Meachem 56-yard pass from Drew Brees (John Kasay kick), 7:29. Saints 38–21. Drive: 4 plays, 61 yards, 2:14.
- DET – Calvin Johnson 12-yard pass from Matthew Stafford (Jason Hanson kick), 4:40. Saints 38–28. Drive 9 plays, 79 yards, 2:49.
- NO – Pierre Thomas 1-yard run (John Kasay kick), 3:36. Saints 45–28. Drive: 4 plays, 44 yards, 1:04.

Top passers

- DET – Matthew Stafford – 28/43, 380 yards, 3 TD, 2 INT
- NO – Drew Brees – 33/43, 466 yards, 3 TD

Top rushers

- DET – Kevin Smith – 6 rushes, 21 yards
- NO – Pierre Thomas – 8 rushes, 66 yards, TD

Top receivers

- DET – Calvin Johnson – 12 receptions, 211 yards, 2 TD
- NO – Marques Colston – 7 receptions, 120 yards

Entering the postseason as the NFC's #3 seed, the Saints began their playoff run at home in the NFC Wild Card Round against the #6 Detroit Lions, in a rematch of their Week 13 contest.

New Orleans trailed early in the first quarter with Lions quarterback Matthew Stafford completing a 10-yard touchdown pass to tight end Will Heller. The Saints answered with a 2-yard touchdown run from running back Darren Sproles, but Detroit replied with Stafford completing a 13-yard touchdown pass to wide receiver Calvin Johnson. New Orleans would close out the half with a 24-yard field goal from kicker John Kasay.

The Saints took the lead in the third quarter with quarterback Drew Brees finding wide receiver Devery Henderson and tight end Jimmy Graham on a 41-yard and a 3-yard touchdown pass, while the Lions tried to stay close as Stafford got a 1-yard touchdown run. Afterwards, New Orleans would pull away in the fourth quarter with a 17-yard touchdown run from Sproles, followed by Brees connecting with wide receiver Robert Meachem on a 56-yard touchdown pass. Detroit tried to rally with Stafford completing a 12-yard touchdown pass to Johnson, and following this, the Lions attempted an onside kick, but the Saints recovered the kick. The Saints were still able to drive down the field and closed out the game with a 1-yard touchdown run from running back Pierre Thomas.

With the win, New Orleans improved its overall record to 14–3.

==== NFC Divisional Playoff Game: at San Francisco 49ers ====
NFC Divisional Playoff Game: New Orleans Saints at San Francisco 49ers – Game summary

Quarter	1	2	3	4	Total
Saints	0	14	0	18	32
49ers	14	3	3	16	36

at Candlestick Park, San Francisco, California

- Date: January 14, 2012
- Game time: 3:30 pm. CST/1:30 p.m. PST
- Referee: John Parry
- TV announcers (Fox): Kenny Albert, Daryl Johnston and Tony Siragusa
- Recap

Game information

First quarter

- SF – V.Davis 49-yard pass from Alex Smith (D.Akers kick) 49ers 7–0. Drive: 2 plays, 54 yards, 0:46.
- SF – M.Crabtree 4-yard pass from Alex Smith (D.Akers kick) 49ers 14–0. Drive: 3 plays, 4 yards, 0:15.

Second quarter

- SF – D.Akers 25-yard field goal 49ers 17–0. Drive 4 plays, 6 yards, 1:23.
- NO – Jimmy Graham 14-yard pass from Drew Brees (John Kasay kick) Saints 7–17. Drive: 9 plays, 80 yards, 4:40.
- NO – Marques Colston 25-yard pass from Drew Brees (John Kasay kick) Saints 14–17. Drive: 7 plays, 66 yards, 3:04.

Third quarter

- SF – David Akers 41-yard field goal 49ers 20–14. Drive: 4 plays, 3 yards, 0:59.

Fourth quarter

- NO – John Kasay 48-yard field goal Saints 17–20. Drive: 9 plays, 37 yards, 3:26.
- SF – David Akers 37-yard field goal 49ers 23–17. Drive: 5 plays, 45 yards, 3:02.
- NO – Darren Sproles 44-yard pass from Drew Brees (John Kasay kick) Saints 24–23. Drive: 9 plays, 79 yards, 3:34.
- SF – Alex Smith 28-yard run (run failed) 49ers 29–24. Drive: 6 plays, 80 yards, 1:51.
- NO – Jimmy Graham 66-yard pass from Drew Brees (Drew Brees–Darren Sproles pass) Saints 32–29. Drive: 4 plays, 88 yards, 0:34.
- SF – Vernon Davis 14-yard pass from Alex Smith (David Akers kick) 49ers 36–32. Drive: 7 plays, 85 yards, 1:28.

Top passers

- NO – Drew Brees – 40/63, 462 yards, 4 TD, 2 INT
- SF – Alex Smith – 24/42, 299 yards, 3 TD,

Top rushers

- NO – Chris Ivory – 9 rushes, 23 yards
- SF – Frank Gore – 13 rushes, 89 yards

Top receivers

- NO – Marques Colston – 9 receptions, 136 yards, TD
- SF – Vernon Davis – 7 receptions, 180 yards, 2 TD

== Awards ==
- Offensive Player of the Year – Drew Brees

== Records ==
=== Team ===
- Most yards gained, season, 7,474
- Most yards gained, passing, season, 5,347
- Most passes completed, season, 472
- Highest completion percentage, season, 71.3
- Most first downs, season, 416
- Most first downs, passing, season, 280
- Most points at home, season, 329
- Most points per home game, season, 41.1
- Most points, single team, game, since AFL–NFL merger, 62 (vs Indianapolis Colts) Oct. 23, 2011 (tied with four other teams)

=== Individual ===
==== Drew Brees ====
- Most passing yards, season: 5,476
- Most consecutive games, 300+ yards passing: 7
- Most consecutive games, 350+ yards passing: 4
- Most consecutive games, 400+ yards passing: 2 (tied)
- Most games, 250+ yards passing, season: 16
- Most games, 350+ yards passing, season: 8
- Most games, 300+ yards passing, season: 13
- Most games, 30 or more pass attempts, season: 16 (tied)
- Most pass completions, season: 468
- Most consecutive games 20 completions: 36 (2009–present)
- Most games 20 completions, season: 16 (tied his own 2010 record)
- Most games 30 completions, career: 29 (2005–present)
- Most games 30 completions, season: 9
- Most games 30 completions and no interceptions, career: 14 (2006–present)
- Most games with 30 completions and no interceptions, season: 5 (tied)
- Highest completion percentage, season: 71.2 (468 for 657)
- Most games with more than 80% pass completion rate, career (minimum 20 passes per game): 12 (2004–present)
- Most games with more than 80% pass completion rate, season (minimum 20 passes per game): 3
- Most consecutive seasons 4,000+ yards: 6 (2006–2011)
- Most career seasons 5,000+ yards: 2
- Most games, 350+ yards passing, career: 29
- Most games, 5+ TD passes, career 7, (2004–present)
- Most games, 1+ TD passes, season 16 (tied)
- Most seasons, 45+ touchdown passes, 1 (tied)
- Most consecutive playoff games, 2+ touchdown passes 7 (tied) (2006–2011)
- Most consecutive passes, none intercepted, post-season: 226 (January 21, 2007 – January 14, 2012)
- Most games with 400 yards passing and no interceptions, career 4 (tied)
- Most games with 5 touchdown passes and no interceptions, career 5 (2004–present)
- Most games with 30 completions and no interceptions, career 14 (2006–2011)
- Passing yards in a single month 1,687 (October 2011)

==== Darren Sproles ====
- Most yards gained, total, season: 2,696
