= Jimmy Graham =

American football player (born 1986)

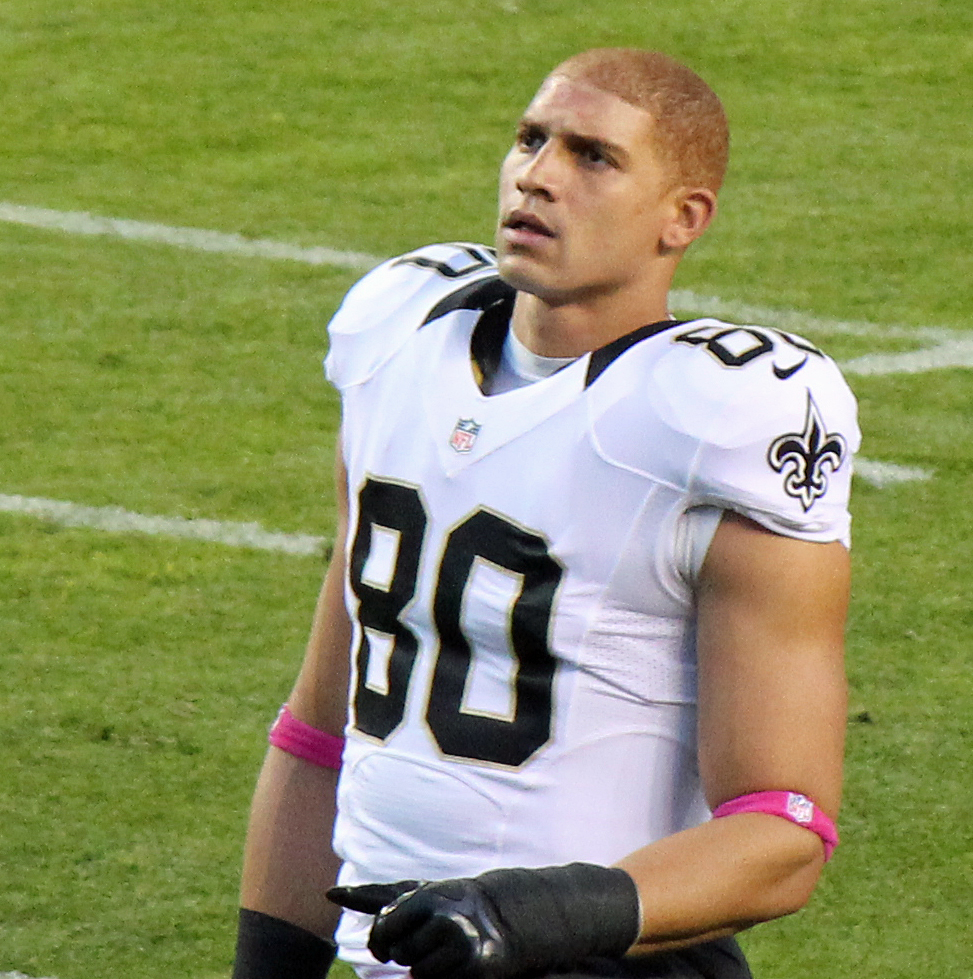
- Graham with the New Orleans Saints in 2012

No. 80, 88
- Position: Tight end

Personal information
- Born: November 24, 1986 (age 39); Goldsboro, North Carolina, U.S.
- Listed height: 6 ft 7 in (2.01 m)
- Listed weight: 265 lb (120 kg)

Career information
- High school: Charis Prep (Wilson, North Carolina)
- College: Miami (FL) (2009)
- NFL draft: 2010: 3rd round, 95th overall pick

Career history
- New Orleans Saints (2010–2014); Seattle Seahawks (2015–2017); Green Bay Packers (2018–2019); Chicago Bears (2020–2021); New Orleans Saints (2023)

Awards and highlights
- First-team All-Pro (2013); Second-team All-Pro (2011); 5× Pro Bowl (2011, 2013, 2014, 2016, 2017); NFL receiving touchdowns leader (2013)

Career NFL statistics
- Receptions: 719
- Receiving yards: 8,545
- Receiving touchdowns: 89
- Stats at Pro Football Reference

Jimmy Graham (born November 24, 1986) is an American former professional football player who was a tight end in the National Football League (NFL). He played only one year of college football for the Miami Hurricanes after playing four years of basketball. Graham was selected by the New Orleans Saints in the third round of the 2010 NFL draft. He also played for the Seattle Seahawks, Green Bay Packers, and Chicago Bears.

In his second season in the NFL, Graham had 99 receptions for 1,310 yards and 11 touchdowns. That year, he made his first Pro Bowl appearance and was selected as an All-Pro player at his position. Graham became the first tight end in Saints history to have more than 1,000 receiving yards in a season. He set the Saints franchise record for receptions in a season while also tying the Saints franchise record for touchdowns in a season. Graham is second all-time for most receiving yards and receiving touchdowns by a tight end in a single season.

In only three seasons, Graham set the Seahawks franchise record for the most receptions, receiving yards, and receiving touchdowns at the tight end position.

== Early life ==
Graham was born in Goldsboro, North Carolina to a black father and a white mother. Graham had a difficult upbringing. At age 11, his mother placed him in a group home where he was physically beaten by older children. In high school, with help from a church youth counselor who took him in and eventually adopted him, Graham improved his grades and became a basketball star. Graham first attended Eastern Wayne High School in Goldsboro, North Carolina. He transferred his sophomore year and attended Community Christian in Wilson, North Carolina. He then played at Charis Prep in Wilson, North Carolina, his junior and senior years, and would earn a basketball scholarship to the University of Miami.

== College career ==
Graham played basketball for the Miami Hurricanes men's basketball team under head coach Frank Haith from 2005 to 2009. Graham graduated from Miami in May 2009 with a double major in marketing and management, then stayed at Miami to take graduate classes while playing a season of football. In 2009, he played tight end and finished the season with 17 receptions for 213 yards and five touchdowns in appearances in 13 games.

== Professional career ==
=== Pre-draft ===
External videos
- Graham's NFL Combine workout

Pre-draft measurables
Height	Weight	Arm length	Hand span	40-yard dash	10-yard split	20-yard split	20-yard shuttle	Three-cone drill	Vertical jump	Broad jump	Bench press
6 ft 6 1/4 in (1.99 m)	260 lb (118 kg)	35 in (0.89 m)	10 5/8 in (0.27 m)	4.56 s	1.58 s	2.66 s	4.39 s	6.90 s	38.5 in (0.98 m)	10 ft 0 in (3.05 m)	15 reps
All values are from NFL Combine/Pro Day

According to scouts, Graham was "extremely athletic, with an outstanding combination of size and speed for the tight end position," yet he was considered very raw since he only had one year of college football experience.

=== New Orleans Saints (first stint) ===
==== 2010 season ====
Graham was selected by the New Orleans Saints in the third round (95th overall) of the 2010 NFL draft. He signed a four-year, $2.445 million rookie contract on July 28, 2010.

As a rookie, Graham started in only five games, playing behind veteran tight end Jeremy Shockey. During Week 9 against the Carolina Panthers, his first NFL game in his home state, Graham caught a 19-yard pass from quarterback Drew Brees to score his first career NFL touchdown, contributing to a 34–3 road victory. During Week 15, against the Baltimore Ravens in Week 15, Graham recorded two receiving touchdowns for his first multi-touchdown game in the 30–24 loss. In the next game against the Atlanta Falcons, he scored the go-ahead touchdown late during the 17–14 victory.

Graham finished the season with 31 catches for 356 yards and five touchdowns. Graham led all National Football Conference (NFC) rookie tight ends in major receiving categories.

==== 2011 season ====
Graham started the season with four receptions for 56 yards and a touchdown in a 42–34 loss to the Green Bay Packers on NBC Thursday Night Football. In Week 3, a 40–33 victory over the Houston Texans, he had four receptions for 100 receiving yards and a receiving touchdown for his first game reaching the century mark. The next week, he recorded 10 receptions for 132 yards and a touchdown in the 23–10 victory over the Jacksonville Jaguars. In the following game, a 30–27 victory over the Panthers, he recorded eight receptions for 129 yards. He recorded his fourth straight game with at least 100 receiving yards in the next game against the Tampa Bay Buccaneers with seven receptions for 124 receiving yards in the 26–20 loss. He recorded six receptions for 54 receiving yards and two receiving touchdowns in the next game against the Indianapolis Colts, a 62–7 victory. Overall, in the 2011 season, his first full year as a starter, Graham had 99 receptions for 1,310 receiving yards and 11 receiving touchdowns and made his first Pro Bowl. He became the first tight end in Saints history to have more than 1,000 receiving yards in a season. He set the franchise record for receptions in a season while tying Marques Colston in 2007 and Joe Horn in 2004 for the Saints franchise record for touchdowns in a season. During the Saints' Week 17 win over the Carolina Panthers, Graham broke Kellen Winslow's NFL record of 1,290 receiving yards in a season by a tight end. However, the record was broken later that day by New England Patriots tight end Rob Gronkowski, who finished the season with 1,327 yards. He was named to the Pro Bowl for the 2011 season. In addition, he was named a second-team All-Pro by the Associated Press and Pro Football Focus.

The Saints finished with a 13–3 record and won the NFC South. In the Wild Card Round against the Detroit Lions, Graham finished with seven receptions for 55 yards and a touchdown in the 45–28 victory. In the Divisional Round against the San Francisco 49ers, Graham had a fourth-quarter 66-yard touchdown to give the Saints the lead, but the Saints ultimately lost 36–32 on a last-second 49ers touchdown pass. Graham finished with five receptions for 103 yards and two touchdowns in the loss. After the season, Graham was ranked 14th overall by his peers in the 2012 NFL Top 100 annual player poll, which ranks the 100 best players in the NFL based on votes from NFL players and coaches.

==== 2012 season ====
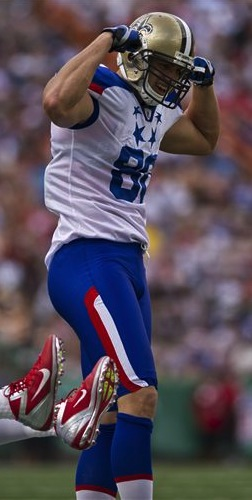
Jimmy Graham 2012 Pro Bowl

Graham started the 2012 season with three consecutive games with a touchdown, all losses for the Saints. With the touchdown in Week 3, Graham tied a franchise record with Dalton Hilliard and Pierre Thomas for most consecutive regular games with a touchdown with six, dating back to the prior season. In Week 10, against the Falcons, he had seven receptions for a career-high 146 yards and two touchdowns in the 31–27 victory. For his efforts against the Falcons, he earned NFC Offensive Player of the Week. In the regular season finale against the Panthers, he had nine receptions for 115 yards and a touchdown in the 44–38 loss. Overall, Graham finished the season with 85 receptions for 982 yards and nine touchdowns.

==== 2013 season ====
In Week 2, a 16–14 victory over the Buccaneers, Graham had ten receptions for a career-high 179 yards and a touchdown. In the following game, a 31–7 victory over the Arizona Cardinals, he had nine receptions for 134 yards and two touchdowns. He earned NFC Offensive Player of the Week honors for his performance against the Cardinals. His hot streak continued in the next game against the Miami Dolphins when he had four receptions for 100 yards and two touchdowns in the 38–17 victory. For his great performances in the month of September, he earned NFC Offensive Player of the Month honors. He became the Saints first tight end to earn a Player of the Month nomination in franchise history. He recorded his fourth consecutive game with over 100 receiving yards in the 26–18 victory over the Chicago Bears with 10 receptions for 135 yards. His four consecutive games with at least 100 receiving yards tied an NFL record for tight ends. However, in the next game against the Patriots, he was targeted six times but did not record a reception in the loss. He was able to rebound in the next game against the Buffalo Bills with three receptions for 37 yards and two touchdowns in the 35–17 victory. In the following game, a 26–20 loss to the New York Jets, he had nine receptions for 116 yards and two touchdowns. During the second divisional matchup against the Atlanta Falcons, Graham became known for his trademark touchdown celebration where he would slam dunk the football over the goalpost, a reference to his basketball background. He infamously bent the goalpost celebrating his touchdown against the Falcons. Prior to the 2014 season, the NFL banned goalpost dunks and made it punishable as "unsportsmanlike conduct," which results in a penalty and a fine. Graham became the first player penalized under the new rule and was fined $30,000 for dunking during the preseason game against the Tennessee Titans in August 2014. On December 8, against the Carolina Panthers, Graham recorded his fifth game with two receiving touchdowns on the season in the 31–13 victory. In the 2013 season, Graham recorded 86 receptions for 1,215 yards and a league-leading 16 receiving touchdowns. He received numerous accolades for his successful 2013 season. He was named to the Pro Bowl, earned First Team All-Pro Honors, and was ranked tenth by his fellow players on the NFL Top 100 Players of 2014.

The Saints recorded an 11–5 record and made the playoffs. During the Wild Card Round, a narrow 26–24 victory over the Philadelphia Eagles, Graham had three receptions for 44 yards. In the Divisional Round against the Seattle Seahawks, he had a single reception for eight yards during the 23–15 loss.

==== 2014 season ====
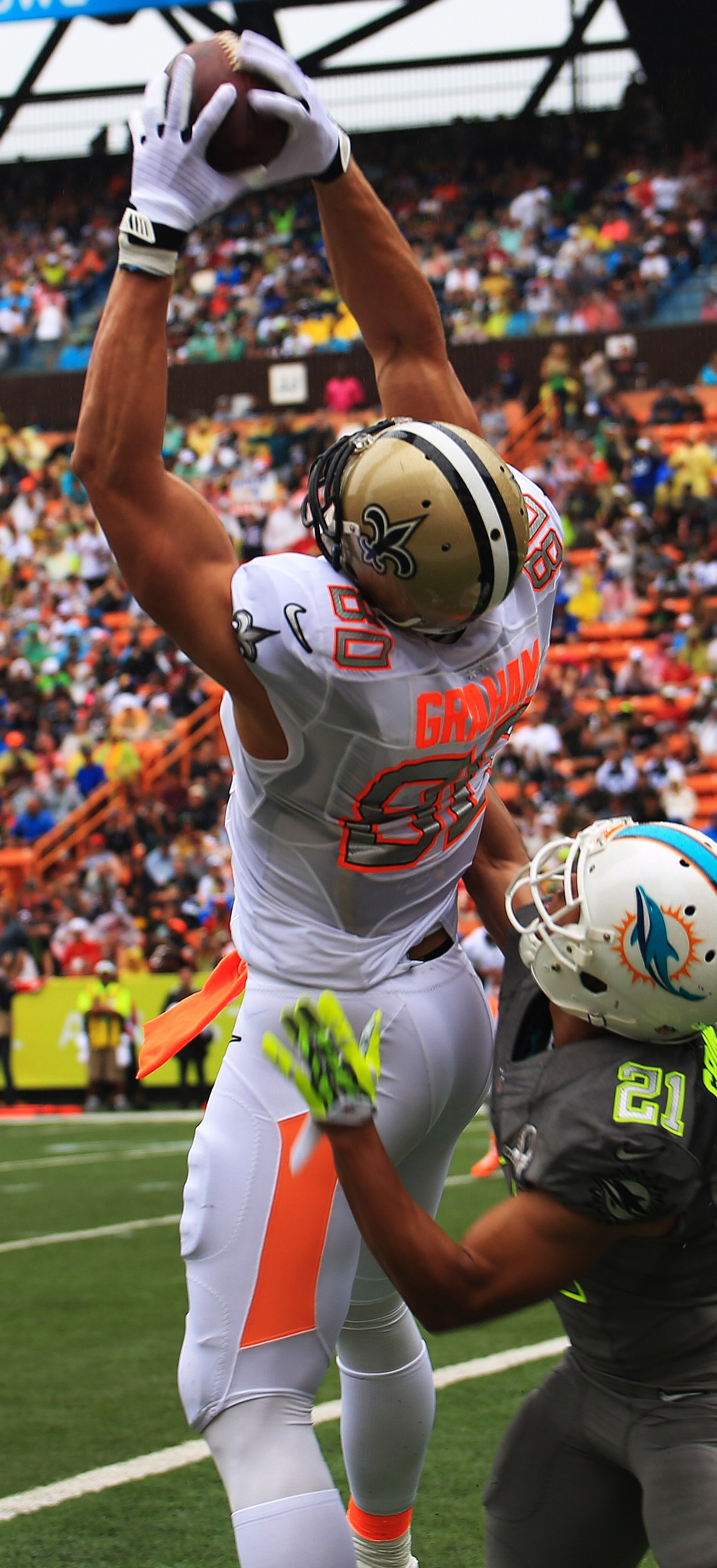
Graham catches a pass over Miami Dolphins cornerback Brent Grimes in the 2014 Pro Bowl

Under the terms of the NFL's collective bargaining agreement, Graham became a free agent after the 2013 season. On February 28, 2014, it was reported that the Saints had placed a non-exclusive franchise tag on him, meaning that he would be allowed to negotiate and sign an offer sheet with another team; the Saints would then have the right to match that offer sheet and retain Graham, and if they did not, the other team would owe the Saints two first round draft picks. No such competing offer sheet was signed, but negotiations between Graham and the Saints were complicated by disagreement as to whether Graham should be treated for bargaining purposes as a tight end (his official position) or as a wide receiver (where he often lines up during games), since the difference in applicable compensation under the franchise tag is more than $5 million for the year. On July 2, 2014, an arbitrator ruled that Graham was indeed a tight end for franchise tag purposes.

Graham appealed the arbitrator's ruling to preserve his position while negotiations continued. On July 15, the last day for a new multiyear contract to be negotiated under league rules, the Saints and Graham agreed on a new four-year deal with $21 million guaranteed and a total value of $40 million over four years, making Graham the highest-paid tight end in the league at the time.

In Week 2, a 26–24 loss to the Cleveland Browns, he had 10 receptions for 118 yards and two touchdowns. On November 9, in Week 10 against the 49ers, he had 10 receptions for 76 yards and two touchdowns in the 27–24 loss. With the Saints in a 21–10 hole late in the third quarter, Graham scored the first touchdown to pull within four. He scored the second late in the fourth to give the Saints a three-point lead, but the team eventually fell in overtime. Two weeks later, against the Ravens, he had six receptions for 47 yards and two touchdowns in the 34–27 loss. In the 2014 season, Graham recorded 85 receptions for 889 yards and 10 touchdowns. He was named to the Pro Bowl for the 2014 season and was ranked 31st by his fellow players on the NFL Top 100 Players of 2015.

=== Seattle Seahawks ===
==== 2015 season ====
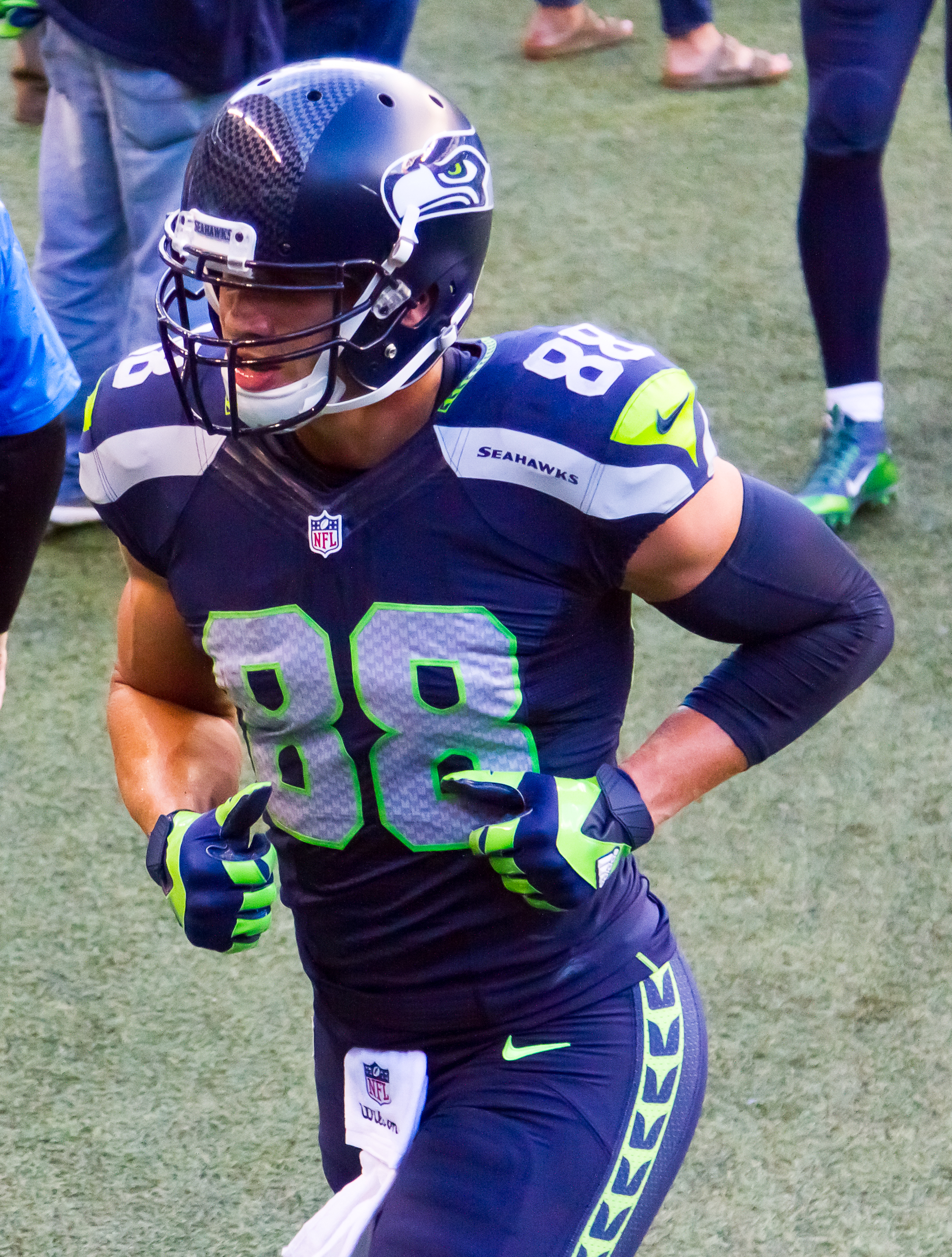
Graham with the Seattle Seahawks in 2015

On March 10, 2015, Graham was traded to the Seahawks for center Max Unger and the Seahawks' first-round selection in the 2015 NFL draft. Graham wore number #88 in Seattle as number 80 was retired in honor of Steve Largent. In his Seahawks debut, he had six receptions for 51 yards and a touchdown in the overtime loss to the St. Louis Rams. Two weeks later, in the 26–0 victory over the Chicago Bears, he recorded seven receptions for 83 yards and a touchdown. On October 18, against the Panthers, he had eight receptions for a season-high 140 yards in the 27–23 loss. On November 29, Graham suffered a torn right patellar tendon against the Pittsburgh Steelers. The next day, Graham was placed on injured reserve. Overall, he finished his first season with the Seahawks with 48 receptions for 605 yards and two touchdowns.

==== 2016 season ====
During Week 3, Graham had six receptions for 100 yards in a 37–18 victory over the San Francisco 49ers. He followed that up with six receptions for 113 yards in the 27–17 victory over the New York Jets. On November 7, against the Buffalo Bills, he had eight receptions for 103 yards and two touchdowns in the 31–25 victory. In the 2016 season, Graham finished the season with 65 receptions for 923 yards and six touchdowns. He was selected to his first Pro Bowl as a member of the Seahawks.

The Seahawks finished 10–5–1 and won the NFC West. In the Wild Card Round 26–6 victory over the Detroit Lions, he had three receptions for 37 yards. In the Divisional Round against the Atlanta Falcons, he had three receptions for 22 yards and a touchdown during the 36–20 road loss.

==== 2017 season ====
Graham started the 2017 season off with four receptions for only nine yards combined in the first two games against the Green Bay Packers and San Francisco 49ers, but he recorded 11 receptions for 133 yards in the two games after against the Tennessee Titans and Indianapolis Colts. In the next game against the Los Angeles Rams, he scored his first touchdown of the season in the 16–10 victory. In the next game against the New York Giants, he found the endzone again as part of a 51-yard performance in the 24–7 victory. In the following game, a 41–38 victory over the Houston Texans, he caught two touchdowns in the 41–38 victory. The second touchdown was a go-ahead touchdown with 21 seconds remaining to put the Seahawks on top. On November 9 against the Arizona Cardinals, he recorded two touchdowns in the 22–16 victory. On December 19, 2017, Graham was named to his fifth Pro Bowl. Overall, he finished the 2017 season with 57 receptions for 520 yards and 10 touchdowns. Graham's 10 receiving touchdowns set a Seahawks franchise record for a tight end in a single season. He broke the mark formerly held by Jerramy Stevens. Graham was ranked 89th by his fellow players on the NFL Top 100 Players of 2018.

=== Green Bay Packers ===
==== 2018 season ====
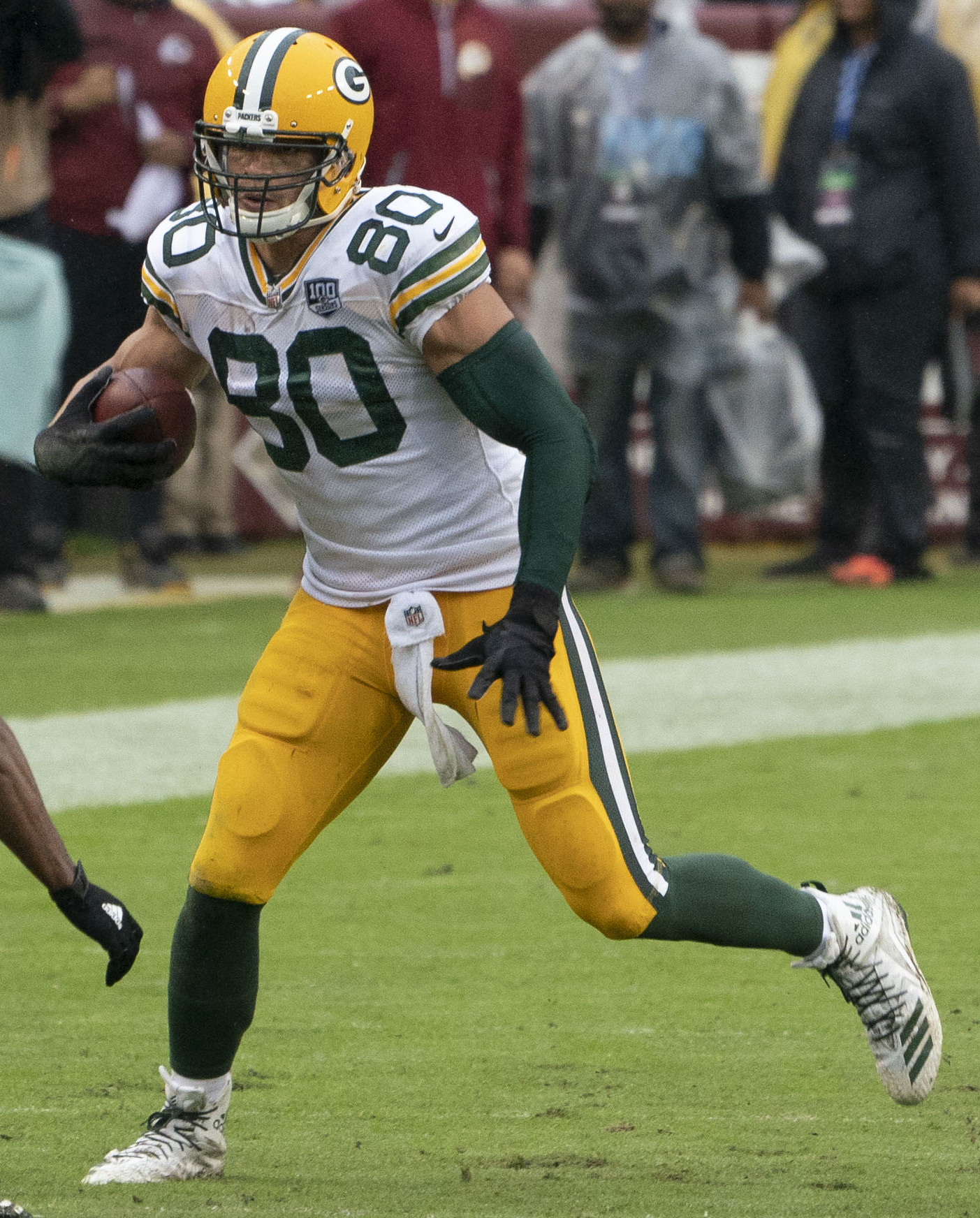
Graham in 2018

On March 16, 2018, Graham signed a three-year, $30 million contract with the Packers.

In the 2018 season, Graham was in a position group with fellow tight ends Lance Kendricks, Marcedes Lewis, and Robert Tonyan. On September 30, in a game against the Buffalo Bills, Graham caught his first touchdown as a member of the Packers, a one-yard pass from quarterback Aaron Rodgers, which was also his 70th career touchdown reception. On October 15, against the San Francisco 49ers, Graham had five receptions for 104 yards, which was his first 100-yard game since Week 8 of the 2016 NFL season. Graham caught his second touchdown of the season on November 4, against the New England Patriots. Overall, he finished the 2018 season with 55 receptions for 636 yards and two touchdowns with 12 starts.

==== 2019 season ====
In Week 1 against the Chicago Bears, Graham caught three passes for 30 yards and the game's only touchdown in the 10–3 win. In Week 4, against the Philadelphia Eagles, he had six receptions for 61 yards and a touchdown in the 34–27 loss. In Week 7, against the Oakland Raiders, he had four receptions for 65 yards and a touchdown in the 42–24 victory. Overall, Graham finished the 2019 season with 38 receptions for 447 yards and three touchdowns.

In the Divisional Round of the playoffs against his former team, the Seattle Seahawks, Graham caught three passes for 49 yards, including a nine-yard reception for a first down which sealed a 28–23 Packers win. In the NFC Championship against the San Francisco 49ers, he had four receptions for 59 yards in the 37–20 loss.

On March 12, 2020, Graham was released by the Packers.

=== Chicago Bears ===
==== 2020 season ====
Graham signed a two-year, $16 million contract with the Bears on March 26, 2020. In the 2020 season, Graham was the primary tight end and shared targets with rookie Cole Kmet. Graham made his debut with the Bears in Week 1 against the Detroit Lions and caught three passes for 25 yards and a touchdown during the 27–23 win. In Week 3 against the Atlanta Falcons, he had six receptions for 60 yards and two touchdowns in the 30–26 victory. In Week 16, against the Jacksonville Jaguars, he had four receptions for 69 yards and two touchdowns in the 41–17 victory. Overall, Graham finished the 2020 regular season with 50 receptions for 456 yards and eight touchdowns.

In the Bears' only playoff game of the season, a 21–9 road loss to the New Orleans Saints, Graham hauled in a 19-yard one-handed touchdown as time expired. As it was the final play of the game, Graham immediately ran into the locker room after the catch.

==== 2021 season ====
On November 25, 2021, Graham caught his first touchdown of the year on a 17-yard pass from Andy Dalton. The touchdown proved to be the only touchdown for the Bears in a 16–14 victory over the Detroit Lions. In the 2021 season, Graham appeared in 15 games, of which he started six, and recorded 14 receptions for 167 yards and three touchdowns. Part of Graham's lessened usage was the emergence of Kmet as the primary tight end.

=== New Orleans Saints (second stint) ===
On July 25, 2023, Graham signed a one-year deal with the Saints after spending the 2022 season out of football. Prior to their second preseason game against the Los Angeles Chargers, Graham was arrested on August 18, in Newport Beach, California, on suspicion of being under the influence of narcotics and obstructing a police officer. It was later revealed that Graham was disoriented and experiencing a medical episode, which team doctors suspect was caused by a seizure. As a result, the charges against Graham were dropped and he was released from the hospital the following morning.

On September 24, 2023, Graham caught his first reception in 21 months on an eight-yard touchdown pass from Derek Carr in a narrow 18–17 loss to the Green Bay Packers. Graham celebrated this touchdown with a Lambeau Leap and was welcomed by fans of his former team. Graham appeared in 13 games and made two starts in the 2023 season. He had six receptions for 39 yards and four touchdowns.

==== Retirement ====
After not playing in 2024, Graham announced his retirement as a member of the Saints on July 22, 2025.

== Career statistics ==
Legend
	Led the league
**Bold**	Career high

=== NFL ===
==== Regular season ====
Year	Team	Games		Receiving					Fumbles	
Year	Team	GP	GS	Rec	Yds	Avg	Lng	TD	Fum	Lost
2010	NO	15	5	31	356	11.5	52	5	1	0
2011	NO	16	11	**99**	**1,310**	13.2	**59**	11	1	1
2012	NO	15	9	85	982	11.6	46	9	1	0
2013	NO	16	12	86	1,215	14.1	56	**16**	0	0
2014	NO	16	13	85	889	10.5	29	10	**2**	**2**
2015	SEA	11	11	48	605	12.6	45	2	0	0
2016	SEA	16	15	65	923	**14.2**	42	6	**2**	**2**
2017	SEA	16	13	57	520	9.1	33	10	0	0
2018	GB	16	12	55	636	11.6	54	2	0	0
2019	GB	16	10	38	447	11.8	48	3	1	0
2020	CHI	16	15	50	456	9.1	30	8	1	0
2021	CHI	15	6	14	167	11.9	28	3	0	0
2023	NO	13	2	6	39	6.5	12	4	0	0
Total		197	134	719	8,545	11.9	59	89	9	5

==== Postseason ====
Year	Team	Games		Receiving					Fumbles	
Year	Team	GP	GS	Rec	Yds	Avg	Lng	TD	Fum	Lost
2011	NO	2	2	**12**	**158**	13.2	**66**	**3**	0	0
2013	NO	2	1	4	52	13.0	21	0	0	0
2016	SEA	2	2	6	59	9.8	14	1	0	0
2019	GB	2	1	7	108	**15.4**	42	0	0	0
2020	CHI	1	0	2	25	12.5	19	1	0	0
Total		9	6	31	402	13.0	66	5	0	0

=== College basketball ===
Season	School	Conf	G	GS	MP	FG	FGA	FG%	PTS	RB	AST	STL	BLK
**2005–06**	**Miami (FL)**	**ACC**	34	10	10.6	0.7	1.6	.444	1.8	2.2	0.1	0.4	0.4
**2006–07**	**Miami (FL)**	**ACC**	24	10	17.8	**2.3**	**4.3**	**.538**	5.6	4.0	0.5	0.5	0.7
**2007–08**	**Miami (FL)**	**ACC**	32	11	18.2	2.2	4.2	.526	**6.0**	4.9	0.4	**0.6**	**1.2**
**2008–09**	**Miami (FL)**	**ACC**	30	9	**18.7**	1.7	3.5	.486	4.0	**5.9**	**0.6**	**0.6**	**1.2**
**Career**	**Miami (FL)**	**ACC**	**120**	**40**	**16.1**	**1.7**	**3.3**	**.508**	**4.2**	**4.2**	**0.4**	**0.5**	**0.9**

=== College football ===
Season	Team	GP	Receiving				
Season	Team	GP	Rec	Yds	Avg	Lng	TD
2009	Miami	13	17	213	12.5	22	5
Total		13	17	213	12.5	22	5
Source: FoxSports.com

== Personal life ==
Graham began working with at-risk youth and military veterans through the Jimmy Graham Foundation. In 2020 and 2021, his work with the foundation earned him a nomination from the Chicago Bears as their nominee for the Walter Payton Man of the Year Award.

Graham is a pilot and became co-chairman, along with aerobatic champion Sean D. Tucker, of the Experimental Aircraft Association (EAA) Young Eagles program in July 2018, which introduces children between the ages of 8 and 17 to general aviation.

In May 2023, Graham was hit by a car while bicycling in Miami, suffering a laceration on his calf that required stitches. According to friend A. J. Hawk, Graham stated that he did "more damage to the car than the car did to him."

On August 19, 2023, Graham was taken into custody in Newport Beach, California reportedly due to a medical condition related to seizures.
