= Michael Higgins (American football) =

American football player (born 1987)

No. 81
- Position: Tight end

Personal information
- Born: December 7, 1987 (age 38); Omaha, Nebraska, U.S.
- Listed height: 6 ft 5 in (1.96 m)
- Listed weight: 242 lb (110 kg)

Career information
- High school: Beatrice (NE)
- College: Nebraska–Omaha
- NFL draft: 2011: undrafted

Career history
- New Orleans Saints (2011–2013); Minnesota Vikings (2014)*
- * Offseason or practice squad member only

Career NFL statistics
- Receptions: 2
- Receiving yards: 1
- Stats at Pro Football Reference

Michael Higgins (born December 7, 1987) is an American former professional football player who was a tight end in the National Football League (NFL). He was signed by the New Orleans Saints as an undrafted free agent in 2011. He played college football for the Nebraska-Omaha Mavericks.

== Professional career ==
=== New Orleans Saints ===
Higgins was signed as a free agent by the New Orleans Saints on July 27, 2011. He was waived on September 3, 2011, and re-signed to the team's practice squad.

=== Minnesota Vikings ===
He was signed by the Vikings on July 23, 2014 and was released on August 26.
