= Jed Collins =

American football player (born 1986)

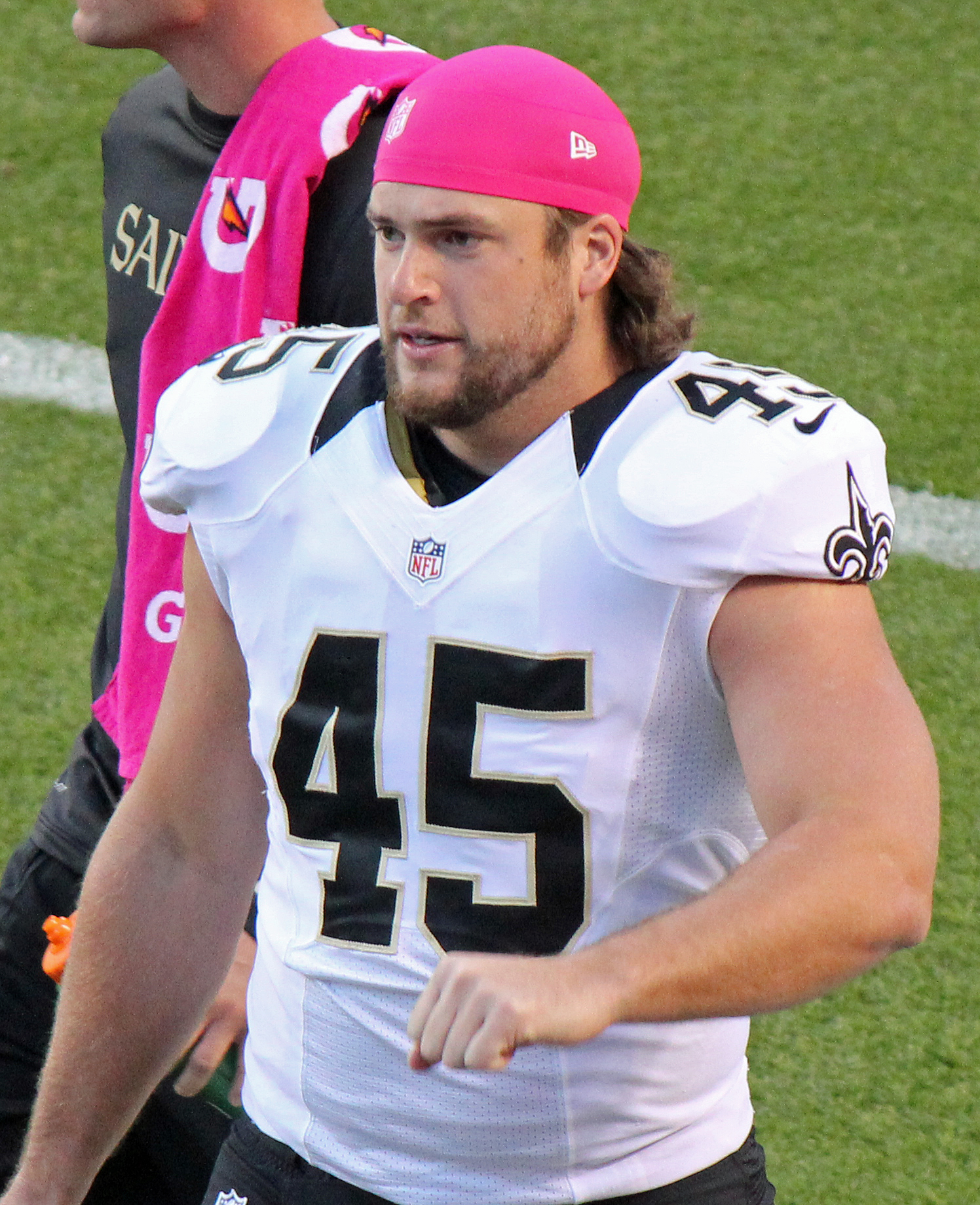
- Collins with the New Orleans Saints in 2013

No. 45
- Position: Fullback

Personal information
- Born: March 3, 1986 (age 40); San Juan Capistrano, California, U.S.
- Listed height: 6 ft 1 in (1.85 m)
- Listed weight: 255 lb (116 kg)

Career information
- High school: Mission Viejo (Mission Viejo, California)
- College: Washington State
- NFL draft: 2008: undrafted

Career history
- Philadelphia Eagles (2008)*; Chicago Bears (2008)*; Cleveland Browns (2008); Kansas City Chiefs (2009)*; Arizona Cardinals (2009)*; Cleveland Browns (2009–2010)*; Tennessee Titans (2010)*; New Orleans Saints (2010–2013); Detroit Lions (2014); Dallas Cowboys (2015)*
- * Offseason or practice squad member only

Awards and highlights
- Second-team All-Pro (2011); Second-team All-Pac-10 (2007)

Career NFL statistics
- Rushing attempts: 27
- Rushing yards: 68
- Rushing touchdowns: 3
- Receptions: 44
- Receiving yards: 213
- Receiving touchdowns: 5
- Stats at Pro Football Reference

Jedidiah Gabriel Collins (born March 3, 1986) is an American former professional football player who was a fullback in the National Football League (NFL). He was signed by the Philadelphia Eagles as an undrafted free agent in 2008. After playing college football at Washington State. He was also a member of the Chicago Bears, Cleveland Browns, Kansas City Chiefs, Arizona Cardinals, Tennessee Titans, New Orleans Saints, Detroit Lions, and Dallas Cowboys.

== Early life ==
Collins was a two-sport letterman (football and basketball) at Mission Viejo High School in Mission Viejo, California. One of his teammates on both the football and basketball teams was future NFL quarterback Mark Sanchez. He was recruited to Washington State as a linebacker but played primarily at tight end, setting a school record in 2007 for most catches by a tight end.

== Professional career ==
=== Philadelphia Eagles ===
Collins was signed by the Philadelphia Eagles as an undrafted free agent following the 2008 NFL draft. He was waived during final cuts, but was re-signed to the team's practice squad on September 3, 2008. He was released from the practice squad on October 21.

=== Chicago Bears ===
Collins was signed to the Chicago Bears' practice squad on October 28, 2008, but was released on November 24.

=== Cleveland Browns (first stint) ===
On November 26, 2008, Collins was signed by the Cleveland Browns. He was a member of the active roster for two games before he was waived and re-signed to the team's practice squad on December 11. He was not re-signed by the Browns following the 2008 season.

=== Kansas City Chiefs ===
On January 8, 2009, Collins signed a two-year contract with the Kansas City Chiefs. However, he was waived during final roster cuts on September 4.

=== Arizona Cardinals ===
On November 4, 2009, Collins was signed to the Arizona Cardinals' practice squad. He was released on November 24.

=== Cleveland Browns (second stint) ===
On December 2, 2009, Collins re-signed to the Browns' practice squad, and was re-signed after the conclusion of the 2009 season on January 7, 2010. He was waived by the Browns prior to the start of training camp on June 15.

=== Tennessee Titans ===
Collins would sign with the Tennessee Titans on August 6, 2010, but was waived during final cuts on September 4.

=== New Orleans Saints ===
Collins signed with the New Orleans Saints' practice squad on September 23, 2010. The Saints at the time, were the defending Super Bowl champions. After spending the entire 2010 season on their practice squad, starting fullback Heath Evans retired, and Collins became the Saints' starter. In his first season as a starter, the Saints' yards-per-carry average went from 22nd in the NFL in 2010 to fourth in the league in 2011, and Collins would be rated by as the second best fullback that season. He also served as the Saints' backup long snapper behind Justin Drescher.

=== Detroit Lions ===
On March 19, 2014, Collins signed a one-year deal with the Detroit Lions, where his offensive coordinator was former Saints coach Joe Lombardi.

=== Dallas Cowboys ===
On March 12, 2015, Collins signed a one-year contract with the Dallas Cowboys. Collins was cut on May 18 so the Cowboys could re-acquire fullback Tyler Clutts.
