= 2001 Atlanta Falcons season =

NFL team season

- Owner: Taylor Smith
- General manager: Harold Richardson
- Head coach: Dan Reeves
- Offensive coordinator: George Sefcik
- Defensive coordinator: Don Blackmon
- Home stadium: Georgia Dome

Results
- Record: 7–9
- Division place: 3rd NFC West
- Playoffs: Did not qualify
- Pro Bowlers: LB Keith Brooking

The 2001 Atlanta Falcons season was the franchise’s 36th season in the National Football League (NFL). The Falcons obtained the first pick overall in the 2001 NFL Draft. With the pick, the Falcons drafted Virginia Tech quarterback Michael Vick.

This was Jamal Anderson’s final season as he re-aggravated his surgically repaired knee in Week 3, and this time, it ended his career. The Falcons improved on their 9–23 record from the previous two seasons but still failed to qualify for the postseason for the third consecutive campaign after a 6–4 start.

This was the final season under the Falcons' founding ownership, the Rankin M. Smith Sr. family, as the franchise was sold to The Home Depot co-founder Arthur Blank in March 2002.

It was also the first season since 1986 that Jessie Tuggle was not on the roster, as he announced his retirement on August 28, 2001.

== Offseason ==
Vick was selected in the 2001 NFL draft as the first overall pick and first African American quarterback taking number 1 in the NFL Draft. The San Diego Chargers had the number one selection spot in the draft that year but traded the rights to the first overall choice to the Atlanta Falcons a day before the draft, for which they received the Falcons’ first round pick (5th overall) and third round pick in 2001 (used to draft CB Tay Cody), a second round pick in 2002 (used to draft WR Reche Caldwell) and WR/KR Tim Dwight. With the Chargers’ downgraded spot (the 5th overall), they selected Texas Christian University running back LaDainian Tomlinson, who went on to become league MVP in 2006. Although Vick has never become league MVP, he finished second in voting in 2004. In this way, Tomlinson and Vick are linked as having been “traded” for each other, although the transaction was actually the result of traded draft picks and contract negotiations.

Additions	Subtractions
RB Travis Jervey (49ers)	K Morten Andersen (Giants)
RB Rodney Thomas (Titans)	P Dan Stryzinski (Chiefs)
S Chris Hudson	LB Jessie Tuggle (retirement)
CB Darrien Gordon (Raiders)	WR Tim Dwight (Chargers)
	CB Terry Cousin (Dolphins)

=== NFL draft ===
2001 Atlanta Falcons draft
Round	Pick	Player	Position	College	Notes
1	1	Michael Vick *	Quarterback	Virginia Tech	
2	35	Alge Crumpler *	Tight end	North Carolina	
4	99	Roberto Garza	Guard	Texas A&M–Kingsville	
4	102	Matt Stewart	Linebacker	Vanderbilt	
5	136	Vinny Sutherland	Wide receiver	Purdue	
6	167	Randy Garner	Defensive end	Arkansas	
7	215	Corey Hall	Defensive back	Appalachian State	
7	219	Kynan Forney	Guard	Hawaii	
7	226	Ronald Flemons	Defensive end	Texas A&M	
7	236	Quentin McCord	Wide receiver	Kentucky	
Made roster * Made at least one Pro Bowl during career

=== Undrafted free agents ===
2001 undrafted free agents of note
Player	Position	College
Matt Allen	Punter	Troy State
Corey Brown	Wide Receiver	Tulsa
Jay Feely	Kicker	Michigan
Dave Kadela	Offensive tackle	Virginia Tech
Trey Merkens	Linebacker	UTEP

== Personnel ==
2001 Atlanta Falcons staff
Front office: President – Taylor Smith; General manager – Harold Richardson; Vice president of football operations – Ron Hill; Director of player personnel/college – Reed Johnson; Director of player personnel/pro – Les Snead; Assistant to head coach/pro personnel – Marvin Bass; Head coaches: Executive vice president of football operations/head coach – Dan Reeves; Offensive coaches: Offensive coordinator/running backs – George Sefcik; Quarterbacks – Jack Burns; Wide receivers – Gary Stevens; Tight ends – James Daniel; Offensive line – Pete Mangurian; Assistant offensive line – Rennie Simmons; Offensive quality control – Ed West	Defensive coaches: Defensive coordinator – Don Blackmon; Defensive line – Bill Johnson; Linebackers – Billy Davis; Secondary – Greg Brown; Defensive quality control – Thom Kaumeyer; Special teams coaches: Special teams – Joe DeCamillis; Strength and conditioning: Strength and conditioning – Al Miller; Assistant strength and conditioning – Rocky Colburn

== Roster ==
2001 Atlanta Falcons roster
Quarterbacks (QB): 12 Chris Chandler; 11 Doug Johnson; 7 Michael Vick; Running backs (RB): 44 Bob Christian FB; 36 Travis Jervey; 41 George Layne FB; 43 Maurice Smith; 20 Rodney Thomas; Wide receivers (WR): 86 Brian Finneran; 84 Shawn Jefferson; 81 Terance Mathis; 88 Quentin McCord; 19 Shawn Mills; Tight ends (TE): 83 Alge Crumpler; 89 Reggie Kelly; 85 Brian Kozlowski; 48 Derek Rackley LS	Offensive linemen (OL): 71 Travis Claridge G/T; 65 Kynan Forney G; 63 Roberto Garza C/G; 64 Bob Hallen G; 73 Dave Kadela T; 62 Todd McClure C; 74 Ephraim Salaam T; 66 Michael Thompson T; 70 Bob Whitfield T; Defensive linemen (DL): 75 Shane Dronett DT; 79 Ronald Flemons DE; 98 Travis Hall DT; 95 Ed Jasper DT; 97 Patrick Kerney DE; 90 Ron Moore DT; 91 Brady Smith DE; 93 Shawn Swayda DE/DT; 99 Chuck Wiley DE	Linebackers (LB): 56 Keith Brooking MLB; 94 Henri Crockett OLB; 54 Chris Draft OLB; 53 Mark Simoneau; 52 Matt Stewart OLB; 50 Artie Ulmer OLB; Defensive backs (DB): 33 Ashley Ambrose CB; 23 Ronnie Bradford FS; 34 Ray Buchanan CB; 35 Johndale Carty SS; 21 Darrien Gordon; 28 Corey Hall FS; 47 Chris Hudson FS; 22 Gerald McBurrows SS; 37 Darrick Vaughn; 21 Elijah Williams CB; Special teams (ST): 4 Jay Feely K; 13 Chris Mohr P	Practice squad: 68 Ian Allen T; 59 Shane Elam LB; 15 Daniel Guy WR; 49 Dallas Neil; 67 Chad Overhauser G; Reserve: 32 Jamal Anderson RB (IR); 17 Corey Brown WR (IR); 55 Antony Jordan LB (IR); 51 Jeff Kelly LB (IR); 82 Mareno Philyaw WR (NF-Inj.); Rookies in italics 53 active, 6 reserve, 5 practice squad

== Preseason ==
Week	Date	Opponent	Result	Record	Venue
1	August 3	Pittsburgh Steelers	L 16–17	0–1	Georgia Dome
2	August 11	at New York Jets	W 20–10	1–1	Giants Stadium
3	August 17	at Washington Redskins	W 27–6	2–1	FedExField
4	August 31	Tampa Bay Buccaneers	W 36–7	3–1	Georgia Dome

== Regular season ==
This was the Falcons’ 32nd and final season as a member of the NFC West Division. If its predecessor, the Coastal Division of the NFL’s Western Conference prior to the 1970 merger, is counted, then it would be the franchise’s 35th season in this division. The Falcons moved to the new NFC South as part of the NFL’s realignment plan for the following season.

=== Schedule ===
Week	Date	Opponent	Result	Record	Venue	Attendance
1	September 9	at **San Francisco 49ers**	**L** 13–16 (OT)	0–1	3Com Park	65,989
2 (Note: The Falcons were originally scheduled to play the St. Louis Rams during Week 2 of the original NFL schedule (September 16) at Trans World Dome in St. Louis. However, due to the September 11 attacks, the game was rescheduled to Week 17.)	September 23	**Carolina Panthers**	**W** 24–16	1–1	Georgia Dome	47,804
3	September 30	at Arizona Cardinals	**W** 34–14	2–1	Sun Devil Stadium	28,878
4	October 7	Chicago Bears	**L** 3–31	2–2	Georgia Dome	46,483
5	October 14	**San Francisco 49ers**	**L** 31–37 (OT)	2–3	Georgia Dome	46,727
6	October 21	at **New Orleans Saints**	**W** 20–13	3–3	Louisiana Superdome	70,020
7	Bye					
8	November 4	New England Patriots	**L** 10–24	3–4	Georgia Dome	44,229
9	November 11	Dallas Cowboys	**W** 20–13	4–4	Georgia Dome	69,010
10	November 18	at Green Bay Packers	**W** 23–20	5–4	Lambeau Field	59,849
11	November 25	at **Carolina Panthers**	**W** 10–7	6–4	Ericcson Stadium	72,234
12	December 2	**St. Louis Rams**	**L** 6–35	6–5	Georgia Dome	59,318
13	December 9	**New Orleans Saints**	**L** 10–28	6–6	Georgia Dome	68,826
14	December 16	at Indianapolis Colts	**L** 27–41	6–7	RCA Dome	55,603
15	December 23	Buffalo Bills	**W** 33–30	7–7	Georgia Dome	43,320
16	December 30	at Miami Dolphins	**L** 14–21	7–8	Pro Player Stadium	73,559
17	January 6	at **St. Louis Rams**	**L** 13–31	7–9	Trans World Dome	66,033
Note: Intra-division opponents are in **bold** text.

=== Standings ===
NFC West
	W	L	T	PCT	PF	PA	STK
^{(1)} St. Louis Rams	14	2	0	.875	503	273	W6
^{(5)} San Francisco 49ers	12	4	0	.750	409	282	W1
New Orleans Saints	7	9	0	.438	333	409	L4
Atlanta Falcons	7	9	0	.438	291	377	L2
Carolina Panthers	1	15	0	.063	253	410	L15
