= 2000 Atlanta Falcons season =

NFL team season

- Owner: Taylor Smith
- General manager: Harold Richardson
- Head coach: Dan Reeves
- Offensive coordinator: George Sefcik
- Defensive coordinator: Rich Brooks
- Home stadium: Georgia Dome

Results
- Record: 4–12
- Division place: 5th NFC West
- Playoffs: Did not qualify
- Pro Bowlers: None

The 2000 Atlanta Falcons season was the franchise's 35th season in the National Football League (NFL). The Falcons offense scored 252 points while the defense gave up 413 points. It was Jessie Tuggle’s 14th and final season with the Falcons, before being waived in the 2001 off-season. He subsequently retired. As for the rest of the team, Atlanta failed to improve upon its 5–11 record from 1999; instead they finished the season 4–12 and missed the playoffs for the second consecutive season after reaching Super Bowl XXXIII in 1998.

The last remaining active members of the 2000 Atlanta Falcons were linebacker Keith Brooking and offensive lineman Todd McClure, who both retired after the 2012 season.

== Offseason ==
=== Signings ===
Position	Player	1999 team	Date signed	Contract
CB	Ashley Ambrose	New Orleans Saints	February 12	Undisclosed
WR	Shawn Jefferson	New England Patriots	February 12	Undisclosed
G	Anthony Redmon	Carolina Panthers	March 22	Undisclosed
RB	Ron Rivers	Detroit Lions	June 30	Undisclosed
DE	Brady Smith	New Orleans Saints	February 19	Undisclosed

=== Departures ===
Position	Player	Reason	2000 team
DE	Lester Archambeau	UFA	Denver Broncos
WR	Chris Calloway	Released	New England Patriots
DB	Eugene Robinson	UFA	Carolina Panthers
LB	Craig Sauer	UFA	Minnesota Vikings
DE	Chuck Smith	UFA	Carolina Panthers
OL	Robbie Tobeck	UFA	Seattle Seahawks

=== NFL draft ===
2000 Atlanta Falcons draft
Round	Pick	Player	Position	College	Notes
2	37	Travis Claridge	Guard	USC	
3	67	Mark Simoneau	Linebacker	Kansas State	
4	100	Michael Thompson	Offensive tackle	Tennessee State	
5	134	Anthony Midget	Defensive back	Virginia Tech	
6	172	Mareno Philyaw	Wide receiver	Troy State	
7	211	Darrick Vaughn	Defensive back	Texas State	
Made roster

=== Undrafted free agents ===
2000 undrafted free agents of note
Player	Position	College
Jake Arians	Kicker	UAB
Doug Johnson	Quarterback	Florida
Dallas Neil	Tight end	Montana
Derek Rackley	Long snapper/Tight end	Minnesota
Maurice Smith	Running back	North Carolina A&T

== Personnel ==
2000 Atlanta Falcons staff
Front office: President – Taylor Smith; General manager – Harold Richardson; Vice president of football operations – Ron Hill; Director of player personnel/college – Reed Johnson; Director of player personnel/pro – Chuck Connor; Assistant to head coach/pro personnel – Marvin Bass; Head coaches: Executive vice president of football operations/head coach – Dan Reeves; Assistant head coach/defensive coordinator – Rich Brooks; Offensive coaches: Offensive coordinator/running backs – George Sefcik; Quarterbacks – Jerry Rhome; Wide receivers – Jack Burns; Tight ends – Rennie Simmons; Offensive line – Art Shell; Assistant offensive line – James Daniel; Offensive quality control – Ed West	Defensive coaches: Defensive line – Bill Kollar; Linebackers – Don Blackmon; Secondary – Greg Brown; Defensive quality control – Thom Kaumeyer; Special teams coaches: Special teams – Joe DeCamillis; Strength and conditioning: Strength and conditioning – Al Miller; Assistant strength and conditioning – Rocky Colburn

== Roster ==
2000 Atlanta Falcons roster
Quarterbacks (QB): 12 Chris Chandler; 11 Doug Johnson; 13 Danny Kanell; Running backs (RB): 32 Jamal Anderson; 44 Bob Christian FB; 45 Gary Downs; 26 Winslow Oliver PR; 20 Ron Rivers; 43 Maurice Smith; Wide receivers (WR): 80 Eugene Baker; 83 Tim Dwight; 86 Brian Finneran; 84 Shawn Jefferson; 81 Terance Mathis; 82 Mareno Philyaw; Tight ends (TE): 89 Reggie Kelly; 85 Brian Kozlowski; 49 Dallas Neil P; 48 Derek Rackley LS	Offensive linemen (OL): 76 Chris Banks G; 71 Travis Claridge G/T; 68 Calvin Collins C/G; 64 Bob Hallen G; 62 Todd McClure C; 63 Evan Pilgrim C/G; 61 Anthony Redmon G; 74 Ephraim Salaam T; 67 Wes Shivers G/T; 70 Bob Whitfield T; Defensive linemen (DL): 98 Travis Hall DE/DT; 95 Ed Jasper DT; 97 Patrick Kerney DE; 91 Brady Smith DE; 93 Shawn Swayda DE/DT; 79 Henry Taylor DT; 99 Chuck Wiley DE	Linebackers (LB): 50 Corey Atkins OLB; 94 Henri Crockett OLB; 54 Chris Draft OLB; 55 Antony Jordan OLB; 51 Jeff Kelly MLB; 53 Mark Simoneau; Defensive backs (DB): 33 Ashley Ambrose CB; 23 Ronnie Bradford FS; 34 Ray Buchanan CB; 25 Marty Carter SS; 35 Johndale Carty SS; 24 Terry Cousin CB; 22 Gerald McBurrows FS; 37 Darrick Vaughn; 21 Elijah Williams CB; Special teams (ST): 5 Morten Andersen K; 4 Dan Stryzinski P	Practice squad: 9 Jake Arians K; 92 William Carr DT; 14 Kevin Daft QB; 90 Ron Moore DT; Reserve: 55 Chris Bordano LB (IR); 56 Keith Brooking LB (IR); 75 Shane Dronett DT (IR); 87 Jammi German WR (IR); 73 Ryan Johanningmeier G (IR); 77 Pellom McDaniels DE (IR); 65 Matt O'Neal C (IR); -- Brian Smith LB (NF-Inj.); 66 Michael Thompson T (IR); 58 Jessie Tuggle LB (IR); Rookies in italics 53 active, 9 reserve, 4 practice squad

== Preseason ==
Week	Date	Opponent	Result	Record	Venue
1	July 29	at Indianapolis Colts	W 20–13	1–0	RCA Dome
2	August 5	vs. Dallas Cowboys	W 20–9	2–0	(Japan) Tokyo Dome (Tokyo)
3	August 11	Cincinnati Bengals	W 31–16	3–0	Georgia Dome
4	August 18	San Diego Chargers	L 14–28	3–1	Georgia Dome
5	August 24	at Jacksonville Jaguars	W 31–20	4–1	Alltel Stadium

== Regular season ==
=== Schedule ===
Week	Date	Opponent	Result	Record	Venue	Recap
1	September 3	**San Francisco 49ers**	**W** 36–28	1–0	Georgia Dome	Recap
2	September 10	at Denver Broncos	**L** 14–42	1–1	Mile High Stadium	Recap
3	September 17	at **Carolina Panthers**	**W** 15–10	2–1	Ericsson Stadium	Recap
4	September 24	**St. Louis Rams**	**L** 20–41	2–2	Georgia Dome	Recap
5	October 1	at Philadelphia Eagles	**L** 10–38	2–3	Veterans Stadium	Recap
6	October 8	New York Giants	**L** 6–13	2–4	Georgia Dome	Recap
7	October 15	at **St. Louis Rams**	**L** 29–45	2–5	Trans World Dome	Recap
8	October 22	**New Orleans Saints**	**L** 19–21	2–6	Georgia Dome	Recap
9	October 29	**Carolina Panthers**	**W** 13–12	3–6	Georgia Dome	Recap
10	November 5	Tampa Bay Buccaneers	**L** 14–27	3–7	Georgia Dome	Recap
11	November 12	at Detroit Lions	**L** 10–13	3–8	Pontiac Silverdome	Recap
12	November 19	at **San Francisco 49ers**	**L** 6–16	3–9	3Com Park	Recap
13	November 26	at Oakland Raiders	**L** 14–41	3–10	Network Associates Coliseum	Recap
14	December 3	Seattle Seahawks	**L** 10–30	3–11	Georgia Dome	Recap
15	Bye					
16	December 17	at **New Orleans Saints**	**L** 7–23	3–12	Louisiana Superdome	Recap
17	December 24	Kansas City Chiefs	**W** 29–13	4–12	Georgia Dome	Recap
Note: Intra-division opponents are in **bold** text.

=== Standings ===
NFC West
	W	L	T	PCT	PF	PA	STK
^{(3)} New Orleans Saints	10	6	0	.625	354	305	L1
^{(6)} St. Louis Rams	10	6	0	.625	540	471	W1
Carolina Panthers	7	9	0	.438	310	310	L1
San Francisco 49ers	6	10	0	.375	388	422	L1
Atlanta Falcons	4	12	0	.250	252	413	W1

== Awards and records ==
- Terance Mathis, Franchise Record, Most Receptions in One Season, 111 Receptions (Broken by Roddy White in 2010)
