= 2002 Atlanta Falcons season =

NFL team season

- Owner: Arthur Blank
- General manager: Harold Richardson
- Head coach: Dan Reeves
- Home stadium: Georgia Dome

Results
- Record: 9–6–1
- Division place: 2nd NFC South
- Playoffs: Won Wild Card Playoffs (at Packers) 27–7; Lost Divisional Playoffs (at Eagles) 6–20
- All-Pros: LB Keith Brooking (2nd team)
- Pro Bowlers: QB Michael Vick; LB Keith Brooking

The 2002 season was the Atlanta Falcons' 37th in the National Football League (NFL) and their first in the newly formed NFC South. It was also the team's first season under new owner Arthur Blank, who acquired the team during the 2002 offseason. The team improved upon their previous season's output of 7–9 and qualified for the playoffs for the first time since 1998. The team was also involved in a rare tie, matching the Pittsburgh Steelers 34–34 at the end of overtime.

Before the season, the Falcons acquired running back Warrick Dunn to help with the team’s running game. Their running game had suffered the past three years. Dunn finished the season with 927 rushing yards and 9 total touchdowns. With the boost of Dunn, the Falcons rushed for 2,368 yards (148 yards per game) and 23 touchdowns, both the fourth-best in the NFL.

After seeing limited action as a rookie, this was Michael Vick's first full season as starting quarterback.

In the Wild Card Game, Vick and the Falcons defeated the Brett Favre-led Green Bay Packers at Lambeau Field, 27–7, giving the Packers their first ever playoff loss in Lambeau. However, a 20–6 loss to Donovan McNabb and the Philadelphia Eagles in the next round kept the Falcons from advancing in the playoffs.

This was Dan Reeves' last full season as head coach as he was replaced by interim Wade Phillips during the following season.

Vick and linebacker Keith Brooking were voted to play in the Pro Bowl after the season. However, neither Vick not Brooking actually participated in the game. The Pro Bowl was Vick's first and Brooking's second. It was the final season the Falcons used their traditional black falcon helmet logo.

The last remaining active member of the 2002 Atlanta Falcons was quarterback Michael Vick, who played his final NFL game in the 2015 season, although he missed the 2007 and 2008 seasons.

== Offseason ==
Signings	Departures
RB Warrick Dunn (Buccaneers)	QB Chris Chandler (Bears)
DE John Thierry (Packers)	G Bob Hallen (Chargers)
DT Ellis Johnson (Colts)	LB Henri Crockett (Vikings)
LB John Holecek (Chargers)	FS Ronnie Bradford (Vikings)
T Todd Weiner (Seahawks)	WR Terance Mathis (Steelers)
CB Allen Rossum (Packers)	DE Chuck Wiley (Vikings)
CB Kevin Mathis (Saints)	
CB Fred Weary (Saints)	

=== NFL draft ===
2002 Atlanta Falcons draft
Round	Pick	Player	Position	College	Notes
1	16	T. J. Duckett	Running back	Michigan State	from Washington via Oakland
3	80	Will Overstreet	Linebacker	Tennessee	
4	116	Martin Bibla	Guard	Miami	from Houston
5	148	Kevin McCadam	Safety	Virginia Tech	
5	158	Kurt Kittner	Quarterback	Illinois	from Oakland
6	184	Kahlil Hill	Wide receiver	Iowa	
7	217	Michael Coleman	Wide receiver	Widener	from Dallas
7	244	Kevin Shaffer	Offensive tackle	Tulsa	
Made roster * Made at least one Pro Bowl during career

=== Undrafted free agents ===
2002 undrafted free agents of note
Player	Position	College
Dusty Bonner	Quarterback	Valdosta State
Curt Davis	Defensive Lineman	Arkansas
R.J. English	Wide receiver	Pittsburgh
Corey Harris	Safety	Arkansas
Brian Holmes	Kicker	Samford
Manly Kanoa	Guard	Hawaii
Curt Lessman	Center	Northwest Missouri State
Eric Sims	Cornerback	Eastern Kentucky
Jerry Togiai	Defensive Tackle	Kansas State
Terrance Williams	Running back	UCF
Ryan Wingrove	Defensive End	Bowling Green

== Personnel ==
2002 Atlanta Falcons staff
Front office: Chairman/president/chief executive officer – Arthur Blank; Senior advisor to the president – Bobby Beathard; Vice president of football operations – Ron Hill; College scouting coordinator – Reed Johnson; Director of pro personnel – Les Snead; Assistant to head coach/pro personnel – Marvin Bass; Head coaches: Executive vice president/head coach – Dan Reeves; Offensive coaches: Quarterbacks – Jack Burns; Running backs – Ollie Wilson; Wide receivers – Mike Johnson; Tight ends – James Daniel; Offensive line – Pete Mangurian; Assistant offensive line – Rennie Simmons; Offensive quality control – Ed West	Defensive coaches: Defensive coordinator – Wade Phillips; Defensive line – Bill Johnson; Linebackers – Billy Davis; Secondary – Emmitt Thomas; Defensive quality control – Dennis Allen; Special teams coaches: Special teams – Joe DeCamillis; Strength and conditioning: Strength and conditioning – Al Miller; Assistant strength and conditioning – Rocky Colburn

== Roster ==
2002 Atlanta Falcons roster
Quarterbacks (QB): 11 Doug Johnson; 15 Kurt Kittner; 7 Michael Vick; Running backs (RB): 44 Bob Christian FB; 45 T. J. Duckett; 28 Warrick Dunn; 38 George Layne FB; Wide receivers (WR): 82 Darrin Chiaverini; 86 Brian Finneran; 81 Trevor Gaylor; 84 Shawn Jefferson; 88 Quentin McCord; Tight ends (TE): 83 Alge Crumpler; 89 Reggie Kelly; 85 Brian Kozlowski	Offensive linemen (OL): 64 Martin Bibla G; 71 Travis Claridge G; 65 Kynan Forney G; 63 Roberto Garza C/G; 62 Todd McClure C; 76 Kevin Shaffer T; 66 Michael Thompson T; 74 Todd Weiner T; 70 Bob Whitfield T; Defensive linemen (DL): 77 Ronald Flemons DE; 98 Travis Hall DE; 95 Ed Jasper NT; 61 Ellis Johnson NT; 97 Patrick Kerney DE; 91 Brady Smith DE	Linebackers (LB): 56 Keith Brooking ILB; 54 Chris Draft ILB; 59 John Holecek ILB; 51 Karon Riley OLB; 93 Sam Rogers OLB; 53 Mark Simoneau ILB; 52 Matt Stewart OLB; 55 John Thierry OLB; 50 Artie Ulmer OLB; Defensive backs (DB): 33 Ashley Ambrose CB; 21 Juran Bolden CB/S; 34 Ray Buchanan CB; 29 Keion Carpenter FS; 35 Johndale Carty SS; 30 Henry Jones FS; 23 Kevin Mathis CB; 47 Kevin McCadam SS; 20 Allen Rossum CB/RS; 22 Gerald McBurrows SS; 24 Fred Weary CB; Special teams (ST): 4 Jay Feely K; 13 Chris Mohr P; 48 Derek Rackley LS	Practice squad: 27 Jeff Chaney RB; 87 Jimmy Farris WR; 69 Kris Farris T; 80 Jason Waters WR; 79 Ryan Watson DT; Reserve: 75 Shane Dronett DE (IR); 16 R. J. English WR (IR); 36 Travis Jervey RB (IR); 49 Dallas Neil (IR); 90 Will Overstreet LB (IR); -- Jerry Togiai DT (IR); Rookies in italics 53 active, 6 reserve, 5 practice squad

== Regular season ==
=== Schedule ===
In addition to their NFC South rivals, the Falcons played all teams from the NFC North and AFC North. In addition, the Falcons played the New York Giants from the NFC East, and the Seattle Seahawks from the NFC West, based on 2001 standings.

Week	Date	Opponent	Result	Record	Venue	Attendance
1	September 8	at Green Bay Packers	**L** 34–37 (OT)	0–1	Lambeau Field	63,127
2	September 15	Chicago Bears	**L** 13–14	0–2	Georgia Dome	68,081
3	September 22	Cincinnati Bengals	**W** 30–3	1–2	Georgia Dome	68,129
4	Bye					
5	October 6	**Tampa Bay Buccaneers**	**L** 6–20	1–3	Georgia Dome	68,936
6	October 13	at New York Giants	**W** 17–10	2–3	Giants Stadium	78,728
7	October 20	**Carolina Panthers**	**W** 30–0	3–3	Georgia Dome	68,056
8	October 27	at **New Orleans Saints**	**W** 37–35	4–3	Louisiana Superdome	67,883
9	November 3	Baltimore Ravens	**W** 20–17	5–3	Georgia Dome	68,532
10	November 10	at Pittsburgh Steelers	**T** 34–34 (OT)	5–3–1	Heinz Field	62,779
11	November 17	**New Orleans Saints**	**W** 24–17	6–3–1	Georgia Dome	70,382
12	November 24	at **Carolina Panthers**	**W** 41–0	7–3–1	Ericsson Stadium	72,533
13	December 1	at Minnesota Vikings	**W** 30–24 (OT)	8–3–1	Hubert H. Humphrey Metrodome	63,947
14	December 8	at **Tampa Bay Buccaneers**	**L** 10–34	8–4–1	Raymond James Stadium	65,648
15	December 15	Seattle Seahawks	**L** 24–30 (OT)	8–5–1	Georgia Dome	69,551
16	December 22	Detroit Lions	**W** 36–15	9–5–1	Georgia Dome	69,307
17	December 29	at Cleveland Browns	**L** 16–24	9–6–1	Cleveland Browns Stadium	73,528
Note: Intra-division opponents are in **bold** text.

=== Game summaries ===
==== Week 1: at Green Bay Packers ====
Week 1: Atlanta Falcons at Green Bay Packers

Quarter	1	2	3	4	OT	Total
Falcons	0	21	3	10	0	**34**
**Packers**	3	10	14	7	3	**37**

at Lambeau Field, Green Bay, Wisconsin

- Date: September 8, 2002
- Game time: 1:00 p.m.
- Game weather: Sunny, 83 °F (28 °C)
- Game attendance: 63,127
- Referee: Ron Winter (14)
- TV announcers (Fox): Curt Menefee, Tim Ryan, and Drew Smith
- Recap, Game Book

Game information

**First quarter**

- GB – Ryan Longwell 28-yard field goal, 4:08. Packers 3–0. **Drive: 15 plays, 77 yards, 8:45.**

**Second quarter**

- ATL – Michael Vick 2-yard run (Jay Feely kick), 11:26. Falcons 7–3. **Drive: 12 plays, 79 yards, 7:42.**
- ATL – Warrick Dunn 3-yard run (Jay Feely kick), 8:43. Falcons 14–3. **Drive: 4 plays, 28 yards, 2:31.**
- GB – David Martin 3-yard pass from Brett Favre (Ryan Longwell kick), 5:54. Falcons 14–10. **Drive: 6 plays, 80 yards, 2:49.**
- ATL – Alge Crumpler 2-yard pass from Michael Vick (Jay Feely kick), 1:15. Falcons 21–10. **Drive: 5 plays, 68 yards, 3:01.**
- GB – Ryan Longwell 42-yard field goal, 0:00. Falcons 21–13. **Drive: 9 plays, 56 yards, 1:15.**

**Third quarter**

- GB – Rondell Mealey 2-yard run (Ryan Longwell kick), 12:48. Falcons 21–20. **Drive: 4 plays, 59 yards, 2:12.**
- ATL – Jay Feely 21-yard field goal, 5:24. Falcons 24–20. **Drive: 15 plays, 76 yards, 7:24.**
- GB – Javon Walker 13-yard pass from Brett Favre (Ryan Longwell kick), 0:30. Packers 27–24. **Drive: 7 plays, 67 yards, 4:54.**

**Fourth quarter**

- ATL – Warrick Dunn 2-yard run (Jay Feely kick), 8:07. Falcons 31–27. **Drive: 6 plays, 45 yards, 3:36.**
- GB – William Henderson 1-yard run (Ryan Longwell kick), 1:10. Packers 34–31. **Drive: 14 plays, 80 yards, 6:57.**
- ATL – Jay Feely 52-yard field goal, 0:05. Tied 34–34. **Drive: 6 plays, 35 yards, 1:05.**

**Overtime**

- GB – Ryan Longwell 34-yard field goal, 5:15. Packers 37–34. **Drive: 7 plays, 44 yards, 4:15.**

**Top passers**

- ATL – Michael Vick – 15/23, 209 yards, TD
- GB – Brett Favre – 25/36, 284 yards, 2 TD

**Top rushers**

- ATL – Michael Vick – 9 rushes, 72 yards, TD
- GB – Ahman Green – 27 rushes, 155 yards

**Top receivers**

- ATL – Willie Jackson – 4 receptions, 73 yards
- GB – Donald Driver – 7 receptions, 78 yards

==== Week 2: vs. Chicago Bears ====
Week 2: Chicago Bears at Atlanta Falcons

Quarter	1	2	3	4	Total
**Bears**	0	7	7	0	**14**
Falcons	0	10	3	0	**13**

at Georgia Dome, Atlanta, Georgia

- Date: September 15, 2002
- Game time: 1:00 pm
- Game weather: None (indoor stadium)
- Game attendance: 68,081
- Referee: Jeff Triplette (42)
- TV announcers (Fox): Pat Summerall, Brian Baldinger
- Recap, Game Book

Game information

**First quarter**

- No scoring plays.

**Second quarter**

- ATL – Warrick Dunn 10-yard pass from Michael Vick (Jay Feely kick), 11:33. Falcons 7–0. **Drive: 8 plays, 38 yards, 4:00.**
- CHI – Anthony Thomas 3-yard run (Paul Edinger kick), 1:10. Tied 7–7. **Drive: 10 plays, 86 yards, 5:04.**
- ATL – Jay Feely 37-yard field goal, 0:00. Falcons 10–7. **Drive: 6 plays, 55 yards, 1:10.**

**Third quarter**

- CHI – David Terrell 14-yard pass from Jim Miller (Paul Edinger kick), 9:27. Bears 14–10. **Drive: 3 plays, 16 yards, 0:55.**
- ATL – Jay Feely 27-yard field goal, 6:08. Bears 14–13. **Drive: 7 plays, 14 yards, 3:19.**

**Fourth quarter**

- No scoring plays.

**Top passers**

- CHI – Jim Miller – 12/24, 143 yards, TD, INT
- ATL – Michael Vick – 17/28, 166 yards, TD

**Top rushers**

- CHI – Anthony Thomas – 26 rushes, 84 yards, TD
- ATL – Michael Vick – 10 rushes, 56 yards

**Top receivers**

- CHI – Marty Booker – 5 receptions, 48 yards
- ATL – Brian Finneran – 6 receptions, 76 yards

==== Week 3: vs. Cincinnati Bengals ====
Week 3: Cincinnati Bengals at Atlanta Falcons

Quarter	1	2	3	4	Total
Bengals	0	3	0	0	**3**
**Falcons**	13	7	7	3	**30**

at Georgia Dome, Atlanta, Georgia

- Date: September 22, 2002
- Game time: 8:30 pm
- Game weather: None (indoor stadium)
- Game attendance: 68,129
- Referee: Terry McAulay (77)
- TV announcers (ESPN): Mike Patrick, Joe Theismann, Paul Maguire, and Suzy Kolber
- Recap, Game Book

Game information

**First quarter**

- ATL – Jay Feely 44-yard field goal, 10:01. Falcons 3–0. **Drive: 7 plays, 46 yards, 4:69.**
- ATL – Jay Feely 26-yard field goal, 7:19. Falcons 6–0. **Drive: 4 plays, 7 yards, 1:48.**
- ATL – Brian Finneran 20-yard pass from Michael Vick (Jay Feely kick), 1:57. Falcons 13–0. **Drive: 7 plays, 55 yards, 3:28.**

**Second quarter**

- ATL – Brian Finneran 13-yard pass from Michael Vick (Jay Feely kick), 4:56. Falcons 20–0. **Drive: 4 plays, 24 yards, 1:42.**
- CIN – Neil Rackers 24-yard field goal, 0:03. Falcons 20–3. **Drive: 14 plays, 53 yards, 4:53.**

**Third quarter**

- ATL – Warrick Dunn 4-yard run (Jay Feely kick), 5:07. Falcons 27–3. **Drive: 11 plays, 74 yards, 7:00.**

**Fourth quarter**

- ATL – Jay Feely 34-yard field goal, 7:30. Falcons 30–3. **Drive: 10 plays, 46 yards, 5:39.**

**Top passers**

- CIN – Jon Kitna – 18/35, 136 yards, INT
- ATL – Michael Vick – 16/26, 174 yards, 2 TD

**Top rushers**

- CIN – Corey Dillon – 18 rushes, 66 yards
- ATL – TJ Duckett – 18 rushes, 67 yards

**Top receivers**

- CIN – Peter Warrick – 4 receptions, 34 yards
- ATL – Brian Finneran – 6 receptions, 77 yards, 2 TD

==== Week 13: at Minnesota Vikings ====
Week 13: Atlanta Falcons (7–3–1) at Minnesota Vikings (3–8) – Game summary

Quarter	1	2	3	4	OT	Total
**Falcons**	0	14	7	3	6	**30**
Vikings	7	7	7	3	0	**24**

at Hubert H. Humphrey Metrodome, Minneapolis, Minnesota

- Date: December 1, 2002
- Game time: 12:00 p.m. CDT
- Game weather: None (indoor stadium)
- Game attendance: 63,947
- Referee: Ed Hochuli (85)
- TV announcers (FOX): Kenny Albert, Tim Green
- Recap, Game Book

Game information

**First quarter**

- MIN – Daunte Culpepper 1-yard run (Gary Anderson kick), 9:38. Vikings 7–0. **Drive: 11 plays, 75 yards, 5:22.**

**Second quarter**

- ATL – Bob Christian 1-yard run (Jay Feely kick), 12:48. Tied 7–7. **Drive: 2 plays, 40 yards, 0:21.**
- MIN – Hunter Goodwin 2-yard pass from Daunte Culpepper (Gary Anderson kick), 2:40. Vikings 14–7. **Drive: 7 plays, 36 yards, 3:25.**
- ATL – Brian Finneran 39-yard pass from Michael Vick (Jay Feely kick), 0:37. Tied 14–14. **Drive: 6 plays, 77 yards, 2:03.**

**Third quarter**

- MIN – Michael Bennett 1-yard run (Gary Anderson kick), 3:19. Vikings 21–14. **Drive: 5 plays, 41 yards, 2:40.**
- ATL – Michael Vick 28-yard run (Jay Feely kick), 1:00. Tied 21–21. **Drive: 5 plays, 76 yards, 2:19.**

**Fourth quarter**

- ATL – Jay Feely 44-yard field goal, 3:33. Falcons 24–21. **Drive: 8 plays, 29 yards, 3:53.**
- MIN – Gary Anderson 29-yard field goal, 0:11. Tied 24–24. **Drive: 10 plays, 55 yards, 3:22.**

**Overtime**

- ATL – Michael Vick 46-yard run, 12:35. Falcons 30–24. **Drive: 2 plays, 48 yards, 0:51.**

**Top passers**

- ATL – Michael Vick – 11/28, 173 yards, TD, INT
- MIN – Daunte Culpepper – 23/43, 266 yards, 1 TD, 3 INT

**Top rushers**

- ATL – Michael Vick – 10 rushes, 173 yards, 2 TD
- MIN – Michael Bennett – 18 rushes, 86 yards, TD

**Top receivers**

- ATL – Brian Finneran – 5 receptions, 114 yards, TD
- MIN – Randy Moss – 9 receptions, 134 yards

==== Week 15: vs. Seattle Seahawks ====
Week 15: Seattle Seahawks (4–9) at Atlanta Falcons (8–4–1) – Game summary

Quarter	1	2	3	4	OT	Total
**Seahawks**	7	0	14	3	6	**30**
Falcons	14	3	0	7	0	**24**

at Georgia Dome, Atlanta

- Date: December 15
- Game time: 1:03pm local
- Game weather: indoors
- Game attendance: 69,551
- Referee: Ron Blum
- TV announcers (Fox): Kenny Albert, Tim Green, Buck Lanford
- Gamecenter, Gamebook

Game information

**First quarter**

- SEA – Shaun Alexander 3-yard run (Rian Lindell kick), 8:48 (SEA 7–0)
- ATL – Allen Rossum 91-yard kickoff return (Jay Feely kick), 8:35 (Tied 7–7)
- ATL – Alge Crumpler 20-yard pass from Michael Vick (Jay Feely kick), 0:13 (ATL 14–7)

**Second quarter**

- ATL – Jay Feely 22-yard field goal, 0:24 (ATL 17–7)

**Third quarter**

- SEA – Jerramy Stevens 5-yard pass from Matt Hasselbeck (Rian Lindell kick), 11:01 (ATL 17–14)
- SEA – Willie Williams 25-yard fumble return (Rian Lindell kick), 4:02 (SEA 21–17)

**Fourth quarter**

- SEA – Rian Lindell 43-yard field goal, 1:55 (SEA 24–17)
- ATL – Trevor Gaylor 12-yard pass from Michael Vick (Jay Feely kick), 0:17 (Tied 24–24)

**Overtime**

- SEA – Shaun Alexander 27-yard run, 4:24 (SEA 30–24)

**Top passers**

- SEA – Matt Hasselbeck: 22/31, 298 yds, 1 TD
- ATL – Michael Vick: 21/38, 240 yds, 2 TD, 2 INT

**Top rushers**

- SEA – Shaun Alexander: 28 car, 127 yds, 2 TD
- ATL – Warrick Dunn: 20 car, 101 yds

**Top receivers**

- SEA – Koren Robinson: 9 rec, 143 yds
- ATL – Alge Crumpler: 5 rec, 75 yds, 1 TD

**Team** – pass – rush – total – to

- SEA – 298 – 166 – 464 – 3
- ATL – 223 – 150 – 373 – 3

==== Week 16: vs. Detroit Lions ====
Week 16: Detroit Lions at Atlanta Falcons

Quarter	1	2	3	4	Total
Lions	0	0	0	15	**15**
**Falcons**	3	10	6	17	**36**

at Georgia Dome, Atlanta, Georgia

- Date: December 22, 2002
- Game time: 1:00 p.m.
- Game weather: none (indoor stadium)
- Game attendance: 69,307
- Referee: Walt Coleman (65)
- TV announcers (FOX): Dick Stockton, Daryl Johnston, and Ron Pitts
- Recap, Game Book

Game information

**First quarter**

- ATL – Jay Feely 23-yard field goal, 7:50. Falcons 3–0. **Drive: 12 plays, 85 yards, 5:35.**

**Second quarter**

- ATL – Jay Feely 23-yard field goal, 6:06. Falcons 6–0. **Drive: 11 plays, 80 yards, 5:08.**
- ATL – Quentin McCord 20-yard pass from Michael Vick (Jay Feely kick), 0:17. Falcons 13–0. **Drive: 7 plays, 63 yards, 0:59.**

**Third quarter**

- ATL – Jay Feely 36-yard field goal, 10:56. Falcons 16–0. **Drive: 8 plays, 63 yards, 4:04.**
- ATL – Jay Feely 20-yard field goal, 7:20. Falcons 19–0. **Drive: 5 plays, 20 yards, 2:38.**

**Fourth quarter**

- ATL – Jay Feely 39-yard field goal, 13:31. Falcons 22–0. **Drive: 11 plays, 64 yards, 5:25.**
- DET – James Stewart 1-yard pass from Mike McMahon (Mike McMahon-Bill Schroeder pass), 9:53. Falcons 22–8. **Drive: 6 plays, 15 yards, 3:38.**
- DET – Aveion Cason 15-yard pass from Mike McMahon (Jason Hanson kick), 9:31. Falcons 22–15. **Drive: 2 plays, 15 yards, 0:10.**
- ATL – Warrick Dunn 3-yard run (Jay Feely kick), 3:49. Falcons 29–15. **Drive: 10 plays, 88 yards, 5:42.**
- ATL – Brian Finneran 34-yard pass from Michael Vick (Jay Feely kick), 1:51. Falcons 36–15. **Drive: 4 plays, 37 yards, 1:36.**

**Top passers**

- DET – Mike McMahon – 11/33, 149 yards, 2 TD, 3 INT
- ATL – Michael Vick – 20/38, 337 yards, 2 TD, INT

**Top rushers**

- DET – James Stewart – 12 rushes, 34 yards
- ATL – Warrick Dunn – 30 rushes, 132 yards, TD

**Top receivers**

- DET – Bill Schroeder – 2 receptions, 60 yards
- ATL – Quentin McCord – 7 receptions, 182 yards, TD

== Playoffs ==
=== Schedule ===
Week	Date	Opponent	Result	Attendance
Wild Card	January 4	at Green Bay Packers	W 27–7	65,358
Divisional	January 11	at Philadelphia Eagles	L 6–20	66,452

=== Game summaries ===
==== NFC Wild Card: at Green Bay Packers ====
NFC Wild Card Game: (6) Atlanta Falcons at (3) Green Bay Packers – Game summary

Quarter	1	2	3	4	Total
Falcons	14	10	3	0	27
Packers	0	0	7	0	7

at Lambeau Field, Green Bay, Wisconsin

- Date: January 4, 2003
- Game time: 8:00 p.m.
- Game weather: Clear, 31 °F (−1 °C)
- Game attendance: 65,358
- Referee: Bernie Kukar (86)
- TV: ABC
- Recap, Game Book

Game information

First quarter

- ATL – Shawn Jefferson 10-yard pass from Michael Vick (Jay Feely kick), 9:17. Falcons 7–0. Drive: 10 plays, 76 yards, 5:43.
- ATL – Artie Ulmer 1-yard return of blocked punt (Jay Feely kick), 6:38. Falcons 14–0.

Second quarter

- ATL – TJ Duckett 6-yard run (Jay Feely kick), 12:06. Falcons 21–0. Drive: 4 plays, 21 yards, 2:30.
- ATL – Jay Feely 22-yard field goal, 0:00. Falcons 24–0. Drive: 16 plays, 90 yards, 6:34.

Third quarter

- GB – Donald Driver 14-yard pass from Brett Favre (Ryan Longwell kick), 10:26. Falcons 24–7. Drive: 10 plays, 73 yards, 4:34.
- ATL – Jay Feely 23-yard field goal, 3:43. Falcons 27–7. Drive: 12 plays, 73 yards, 6:43.

Fourth quarter

- No scoring plays.

Top passers

- ATL – Michael Vick – 13/25, 117 yards, TD
- GB – Brett Favre – 20/42, 247 yards, TD, 2 INT

Top rushers

- ATL – Michael Vick – 10 rushes, 64 yards
- GB – Ahman Green – 11 rushes, 34 yards

Top receivers

- ATL – Warrick Dunn – 4 receptions, 40 yards
- GB – Javon Walker – 5 receptions, 104 yards

== Standings ==
=== Division ===
NFC South
	W	L	T	PCT	DIV	CONF	PF	PA	STK
^{(2)} Tampa Bay Buccaneers	12	4	0	.750	4–2	9–3	346	196	W1
^{(6)} Atlanta Falcons	9	6	1	.594	4–2	7–5	402	314	L1
New Orleans Saints	9	7	0	.563	3–3	7–5	432	388	L3
Carolina Panthers	7	9	0	.438	1–5	4–8	258	302	W2

=== Conference ===
NFC
#	Team	Division	W	L	T	PCT	DIV	CONF	SOS	SOV
Division leaders
1 (Note: Philadelphia finished ahead of Tampa Bay and Green Bay based on conference record (11–1 vs 9–3/9–3).)	Philadelphia Eagles	East	12	4	0	.750	5–1	11–1	.469	.432
2 (Note: Tampa Bay finished ahead of Green Bay based on head-to-head victory.)	Tampa Bay Buccaneers	South	12	4	0	.750	4–2	9–3	.482	.432
3	Green Bay Packers	North	12	4	0	.750	5–1	9–3	.451	.414
4	San Francisco 49ers	West	10	6	0	.625	5–1	8–4	.504	.450
Wild Cards
5	New York Giants	East	10	6	0	.625	5–1	8–4	.482	.450
6	Atlanta Falcons	South	9	6	1	.594	4–2	7–5	.494	.429
Did not qualify for the postseason
7	New Orleans Saints	South	9	7	0	.563	3–3	7–5	.498	.566
8 (Note: St. Louis finished ahead of Seattle based on division record (4–2 to 2–4).)	St. Louis Rams	West	7	9	0	.438	4–2	5–7	.508	.446
9	Seattle Seahawks	West	7	9	0	.438	2–4	5–7	.506	.433
10 (Note: Washington finished ahead of Carolina based on common games (2–3 to 1–4))	Washington Redskins	East	7	9	0	.438	1–5	4–8	.527	.438
11	Carolina Panthers	South	7	9	0	.438	1–5	4–8	.486	.357
12	Minnesota Vikings	North	6	10	0	.375	4–2	5–7	.498	.417
13 (Note: Arizona finished ahead of Dallas based on head-to-head victory.)	Arizona Cardinals	West	5	11	0	.313	1–5	5–7	.500	.400
14	Dallas Cowboys	East	5	11	0	.313	1–5	3–9	.500	.475
15	Chicago Bears	North	4	12	0	.250	2–4	3–9	.521	.430
16	Detroit Lions	North	3	13	0	.188	1–5	3–9	.494	.375
Tiebreakers (Note: When breaking ties for three or more teams under the NFL's rules, they are first broken within divisions, then comparing only the highest-ranked remaining team from each division.)
