= Philyaw =

Philyaw is a surname. Notable people with the surname include:

- Charles Philyaw (born 1954), American football player
- Deesha Philyaw, American author, columnist, and public speaker
- Dino Philyaw (born 1970), American football player
- Mareno Philyaw (born 1977), American football player
- Raymond Philyaw (born 1974), American football player
