= Travis Hall (American football) =

American football player (born 1972)

No. 98, 92
- Positions: Defensive end, defensive tackle

Personal information
- Born: August 3, 1972 (age 54); Soldotna, Alaska, U.S.
- Listed height: 6 ft 5 in (1.96 m)
- Listed weight: 295 lb (134 kg)

Career information
- High school: West Jordan (West Jordan, Utah)
- College: BYU
- NFL draft: 1995: 6th round, 181st overall pick

Career history
- Atlanta Falcons (1995–2004); San Francisco 49ers (2005)

Career NFL statistics
- Tackles: 455
- Sacks: 42
- Fumble recoveries: 10
- Stats at Pro Football Reference

Travis Todd Hall (born August 3, 1972) is a former NFL defensive end who last played for the San Francisco 49ers. He went to Brigham Young University. He was drafted by the Atlanta Falcons in the sixth round (181st overall) in the 1995 NFL draft. He played 10 years with the Falcons before signing a free agent contract with the 49ers in 2005.

Before his professional career, Hall, a multi-sport athlete, wrestled, played hockey, and football while in high school at West Jordan High School (1990).

Travis formed ProSpot Fitness in 1998. ProSpot Fitness, Inc. develops, manufactures and markets home gyms featuring the company's patented Grab & Go technology.

== NFL career statistics ==
Legend
	Led the league
**Bold**	Career high

=== Regular season ===
Year	Team	Games		Tackles				Interceptions				Fumbles			
Year	Team	GP	GS	Comb	Solo	Ast	Sck	Int	Yds	TD	Lng	FF	FR	Yds	TD
1995	ATL	1	0	0	0	0	0.0	0	0	0	0	0	0	0	0
1996	ATL	14	13	51	44	7	6.0	0	0	0	0	**2**	1	0	0
1997	ATL	16	16	**78**	**61**	17	**10.5**	0	0	0	0	0	1	0	0
1998	ATL	14	13	49	39	10	4.5	0	0	0	0	0	**4**	0	0
1999	ATL	16	15	45	36	9	4.5	0	0	0	0	1	1	0	0
2000	ATL	16	16	62	44	**18**	4.5	0	0	0	0	0	1	0	0
2001	ATL	16	16	51	39	12	2.5	0	0	0	0	0	1	0	0
2002	ATL	11	1	27	14	13	1.0	0	0	0	0	0	0	0	0
2003	ATL	15	2	43	36	7	5.0	0	0	0	0	0	0	0	0
2004	ATL	15	0	29	22	7	3.0	0	0	0	0	1	1	0	0
2005	SFO	16	1	20	14	6	0.5	0	0	0	0	**2**	0	0	0
		150	93	455	349	106	42.0	0	0	0	0	6	10	0	0

=== Playoffs ===
Year	Team	Games		Tackles				Interceptions				Fumbles			
Year	Team	GP	GS	Comb	Solo	Ast	Sck	Int	Yds	TD	Lng	FF	FR	Yds	TD
1998	ATL	3	3	**10**	**6**	**4**	0.0	0	0	0	0	0	**1**	0	0
2002	ATL	2	0	3	2	1	0.0	0	0	0	0	0	0	0	0
2004	ATL	1	0	0	0	0	**1.0**	0	0	0	0	0	**1**	**3**	0
		6	3	13	8	5	1.0	0	0	0	0	0	2	3	0
