= Artie Ulmer =

American football player (born 1973)

No. 53, 50, 54
- Position: Linebacker

Personal information
- Born: July 30, 1973 (age 53); Rincon, Georgia, U.S.
- Listed height: 6 ft 3 in (1.91 m)
- Listed weight: 247 lb (112 kg)

Career information
- High school: Effingham County (Springfield, Georgia)
- College: Georgia Southern; Valdosta State
- NFL draft: 1997: 7th round, 220th overall pick

Career history
- Minnesota Vikings (1997); Frankfurt Galaxy (1998); Denver Broncos (1999); San Francisco 49ers (2000); Atlanta Falcons (2001–2005)

Career NFL statistics
- Tackles: 113
- Sacks: 1
- Passes defended: 1
- Stats at Pro Football Reference

Charles Artie Ulmer (born July 30, 1973) is an American former professional football player who was a linebacker in the National Football League (NFL). He played college football for the Georgia Southern Eagles and Valdosta State Blazers before being selected in the seventh round of the 1997 NFL draft. He played in the NFL for the Minnesota Vikings (1997), Denver Broncos (1999), San Francisco 49ers (2000), and Atlanta Falcons (2001–2005).

Ulmer was the highest draft pick out of Valdosta State University until 2014, despite only playing in only 12 college games. He holds the record for most special teams tackles in a season for the Atlanta Falcons.

== NFL career statistics ==
Legend
**Bold**	Career high

=== Regular season ===
Year	Team	Games		Tackles				Interceptions				Fumbles			
Year	Team	GP	GS	Comb	Solo	Ast	Sck	Int	Yds	TD	Lng	FF	FR	Yds	TD
1999	DEN	7	0	5	5	0	0.0	0	0	0	0	0	0	0	0
2000	SFO	12	2	**23**	15	**8**	**1.0**	0	0	0	0	0	0	0	0
2001	ATL	15	0	19	13	6	0.0	0	0	0	0	0	0	0	0
2002	ATL	15	0	**23**	**22**	1	0.0	0	0	0	0	0	0	0	0
2003	ATL	16	0	22	17	5	0.0	0	0	0	0	0	0	0	0
2004	ATL	16	0	14	13	1	0.0	0	0	0	0	0	0	0	0
2005	ATL	9	0	7	6	1	0.0	0	0	0	0	0	0	0	0
Career		90	2	113	91	22	1.0	0	0	0	0	0	0	0	0

=== Playoffs ===
Year	Team	Games		Tackles				Interceptions				Fumbles			
Year	Team	GP	GS	Comb	Solo	Ast	Sck	Int	Yds	TD	Lng	FF	FR	Yds	TD
2002	ATL	2	0	**2**	1	**1**	0.0	0	0	0	0	0	0	0	0
2004	ATL	2	0	**2**	**2**	0	0.0	0	0	0	0	0	0	0	0
Career		4	0	4	3	1	0.0	0	0	0	0	0	0	0	0
