= Matt Stewart (American football) =

American football player (born 1979)

No. 52, 55
- Position: Linebacker

Personal information
- Born: August 31, 1979 (age 47); Columbus, Ohio, U.S.
- Listed height: 6 ft 4 in (1.93 m)
- Listed weight: 239 lb (108 kg)

Career information
- High school: St. Francis DeSales (Columbus)
- College: Vanderbilt
- NFL draft: 2001: 4th round, 102nd overall pick

Career history
- Atlanta Falcons (2001–2004); Cleveland Browns (2005–2007); Arizona Cardinals (2008)*; Dallas Cowboys (2009)*; Pittsburgh Steelers (2010)*
- * Offseason or practice squad member only

Awards and highlights
- First-team All-SEC (2000)

Career NFL statistics
- Total tackles: 299
- Sacks: 8
- Forced fumbles: 4
- Fumble recoveries: 5
- Interceptions: 1
- Stats at Pro Football Reference

Matt Stewart (born August 31, 1979) is an American former professional football player who was a linebacker and long snapper in the National Football League (NFL). He was selected by the Atlanta Falcons in the fourth round of the 2001 NFL draft. He played college football for the Vanderbilt Commodores.

Stewart was also a member of the Cleveland Browns, Arizona Cardinals, Dallas Cowboys, and Pittsburgh Steelers.

== Early life ==
Stewart was born in 1979 to Van and Mimi Stewart in Columbus, Ohio. He played for St. Francis DeSales High School.

== College career ==
He totaled 269 tackles and 15 sacks in the 44 games he played in at Vanderbilt University. He earned a bachelor's degree in Mechanical Engineering.

== Professional career ==
Pre-draft measurables
Height	Weight	Arm length	Hand span	40-yard dash	10-yard split	20-yard split	20-yard shuttle	Vertical jump	Broad jump	Bench press
6 ft 3 5/8 in (1.92 m)	236 lb (107 kg)	31 1/2 in (0.80 m)	10 in (0.25 m)	4.75 s	1.62 s	2.73 s	4.20 s	37.0 in (0.94 m)	9 ft 9 in (2.97 m)	23 reps
All values from NFL Combine

=== Atlanta Falcons ===
Stewart was selected by the Atlanta Falcons in the fourth round (102nd overall) in the 2001 NFL draft. In his rookie season he played in 15 games and finished the season with 16 tackles. In the 2002 season, he played in all 16 games starting 13 of them, he finished the season with 87 tackles.

=== Cleveland Browns ===
Stewart signed with the Cleveland Browns as a free agent in 2005. He appeared in 30 games (16 starts) for the team over the next two seasons, recording 59 tackles (44 solo), one sack, one interception and two passes defensed. He missed the entire 2007 season on injured reserve with a torn shoulder muscle before becoming a free agent in 2008.

=== Arizona Cardinals ===
On April 16, 2008, Stewart signed a one-year contract with the Arizona Cardinals. He was later released on August 30, 2008, during final cuts.

=== Dallas Cowboys ===
On March 3, 2009, Stewart agreed to terms on a one-year contract with the Cowboys reuniting him with Head Coach Wade Phillips and linebacker Keith Brooking who were also both members of the Atlanta Falcons. However, he did not make the final roster for the 2009 season.

=== Pittsburgh Steelers ===
On June 7, 2010, it was reported that the Pittsburgh Steelers had signed Stewart as a long snapper. He was released on July 30, 2010. On August 23, 2010, the Steelers re-signed Stewart to a one-year deal. He was again released on September 4, 2010.

=== NFL Stats ===
Year	Team	Games	Combined tackles	Tackles	Assisted tackles	Sacks	Forced fumbles	Fumble recoveries	Fumble return yards	Interceptions	Interception return yards	Yards per interception return	Longest interception return	Interceptions returned for touchdown	Passes defended
2001	ATL	15	25	21	4	0.0	0	1	0	0	0	0	0	0	0
2002	ATL	16	59	55	4	3.0	1	1	0	0	0	0	0	0	0
2003	ATL	16	77	60	17	2.5	3	3	0	0	0	0	0	0	1
2004	ATL	16	71	59	12	1.5	0	0	0	0	0	0	0	0	4
2005	CLE	14	39	27	12	0.0	1	0	0	1	0	0	0	0	3
2006	CLE	16	20	17	3	1.0	0	0	0	0	0	0	0	0	0
Total	Total	93	291	239	52	8.0	5	5	0	1	0	0	0	0	8
