= Bob Christian (American football) =

American football player (born 1968)

No. 44 ,29
- Position: Fullback

Personal information
- Born: November 14, 1968 (age 57); Florissant, Missouri, U.S.
- Listed height: 5 ft 11 in (1.80 m)
- Listed weight: 226 lb (103 kg)

Career information
- High school: McCluer North (Florissant)
- College: Northwestern
- NFL draft: 1991: 12th round, 310th overall pick
- Expansion draft: 1995: 14th round, 28th overall pick

Career history
- Atlanta Falcons (1991)*; San Diego Chargers (1992)*; Chicago Bears (1992–1994); Carolina Panthers (1995–1996); Atlanta Falcons (1997–2002)
- * Offseason or practice squad member only

Career NFL statistics
- Rushing yards: 831
- Rushing average: 4.3
- Rushing touchdowns: 12
- Receptions: 230
- Receiving yards: 2,048
- Receiving touchdowns: 7
- Stats at Pro Football Reference

Robert Douglas Christian (born November 14, 1968) is an American former professional football player who was a fullback for 10 seasons in the National Football League (NFL) for the Chicago Bears, Carolina Panthers, and Atlanta Falcons from 1992 to 2002. He played college football for the Northwestern Wildcats and was selected by the Falcons in the 12th round of the 1991 NFL draft. He was also selected by the Carolina Panthers in the 1995 NFL expansion draft.

== College career ==
Christian played college football for Northwestern University where he set records (since broken) for career rushing, single season rushing, and single game all-purpose yards.

== Professional career ==
Christian played with Chicago Bears and Carolina Panthers prior to signing with Atlanta in 1997 and had 831 yards and 12 touchdowns on 193 carries in 135 games, including 85 starts. He had 230 receptions for 2,048 yards and seven touchdowns. Christian retired on March 13, 2003, after 11 seasons in the NFL.

== NFL career statistics ==
Legend
| **Bold** | Career high |

| Year | Team | Games | | Rushing | | | | | Receiving | | | | |
| Year | Team | GP | GS | Att | Yds | Avg | Lng | TD | Rec | Yds | Avg | Lng | TD |
|---|---|---|---|---|---|---|---|---|---|---|---|---|---|
| 1992 | CHI | 2 | 0 | 0 | 0 | 0.0 | 0 | 0 | 0 | 0 | 0.0 | 0 | 0 |
| 1993 | CHI | 14 | 1 | 8 | 19 | 2.4 | 12 | 0 | 16 | 160 | 10.0 | 36 | 0 |
| 1994 | CHI | 12 | 0 | 7 | 29 | 4.1 | 8 | 0 | 2 | 30 | **15.0** | 21 | 0 |
| 1995 | CAR | 14 | 12 | 41 | 158 | 3.9 | 17 | 0 | 29 | 255 | 8.8 | 23 | 1 |
| 1997 | ATL | **16** | 12 | 7 | 8 | 1.1 | 3 | 0 | 22 | 154 | 7.0 | 19 | 1 |
| 1998 | ATL | 14 | 11 | 8 | 21 | 2.6 | 6 | 2 | 19 | 214 | 11.3 | 39 | 1 |
| 1999 | ATL | **16** | **14** | 38 | 174 | 4.6 | 33 | **5** | 40 | 354 | 8.9 | 36 | **2** |
| 2000 | ATL | **16** | **14** | 9 | 19 | 2.1 | 7 | 0 | 44 | 315 | 7.2 | 19 | 0 |
| 2001 | ATL | **16** | 8 | **44** | **284** | **6.5** | **53** | 2 | **45** | **392** | 8.7 | 42 | **2** |
| 2002 | ATL | 15 | 10 | 31 | 119 | 3.8 | 16 | 3 | 13 | 174 | 13.4 | **55** | 0 |
| Career | | 135 | 82 | 193 | 831 | 4.3 | 53 | 12 | 230 | 2,048 | 8.9 | 55 | 7 |

== Current career ==
After spending time training and guiding aspiring athletes with TCBOOST Sports Performance, founded by his brother Tommy, he is now following his dream of flying and serves as a captain for Omaha-based JetLinx in Tulsa, Oklahoma.
