= Gerald McBurrows =

American football player (born 1973)

No. 23, 22
- Position: Safety

Personal information
- Born: October 7, 1973 (age 53); Detroit, Michigan, U.S.
- Listed height: 5 ft 11 in (1.80 m)
- Listed weight: 208 lb (94 kg)

Career information
- High school: Martin Luther King (Detroit)
- College: Kansas
- NFL draft: 1995: 7th round, 214th overall pick

Career history
- St. Louis Rams (1995–1998); Atlanta Falcons (1999–2003)

Career NFL statistics
- Tackles: 345
- Sacks: 4.5
- Interceptions: 5
- Stats at Pro Football Reference

Gerald McBurrows (born October 7, 1973) is an American former professional football player who played safety in the National Football League (NFL) for the St. Louis Rams and Atlanta Falcons. He was selected in the seventh round of the 1995 NFL draft. He played college football at the University of Kansas.

== NFL career statistics ==
Legend
**Bold**	Career high

=== Regular season ===
Year	Team	Games		Tackles				Interceptions				Fumbles			
Year	Team	GP	GS	Comb	Solo	Ast	Sck	Int	Yds	TD	Lng	FF	FR	Yds	TD
1995	STL	14	3	27	23	4	1.0	0	0	0	0	0	0	0	0
1996	STL	16	7	**62**	**55**	7	0.0	1	3	0	3	0	0	0	0
1997	STL	8	3	19	16	3	0.0	0	0	0	0	0	0	0	0
1998	STL	10	0	3	3	0	0.0	0	0	0	0	0	1	0	0
1999	ATL	16	4	50	37	**13**	1.0	**2**	**64**	0	**41**	0	1	0	0
2000	ATL	16	4	47	38	9	**2.0**	0	0	0	0	0	**2**	0	0
2001	ATL	14	8	54	48	6	0.0	0	0	0	0	**1**	1	**15**	0
2002	ATL	15	14	59	48	11	0.5	**2**	36	0	19	0	0	0	0
2003	ATL	13	2	24	21	3	0.0	0	0	0	0	**1**	1	0	0
Career		122	45	345	289	56	4.5	5	103	0	41	2	6	15	0

=== Playoffs ===
Year	Team	Games		Tackles				Interceptions				Fumbles			
Year	Team	GP	GS	Comb	Solo	Ast	Sck	Int	Yds	TD	Lng	FF	FR	Yds	TD
2002	ATL	2	1	9	8	1	0.0	0	0	0	0	0	0	0	0
Career		2	1	9	8	1	0.0	0	0	0	0	0	0	0	0
