= Patrick Kerney =

American football player (born 1976)

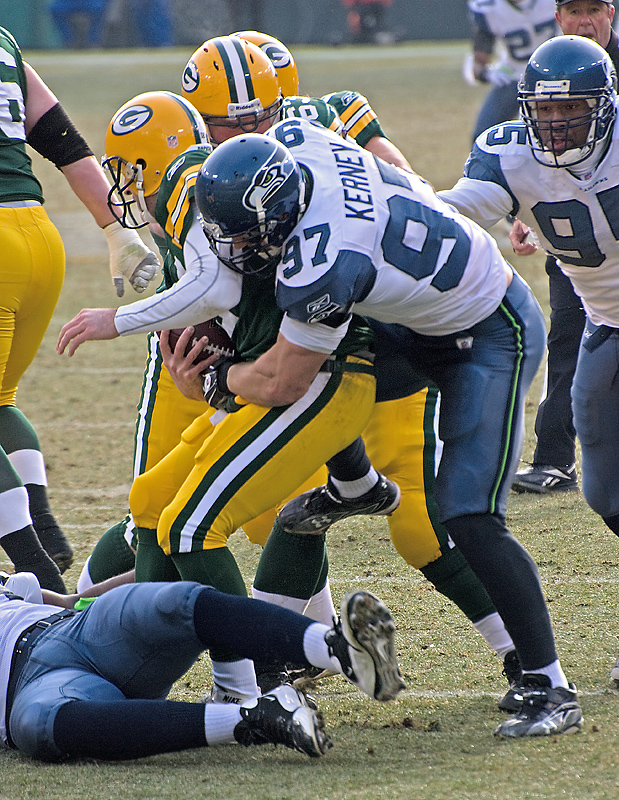
- Kerney sacking Aaron Rodgers in 2009

No. 97
- Position: Defensive end

Personal information
- Born: December 30, 1976 (age 49); Trenton, New Jersey, U.S.
- Listed height: 6 ft 6 in (1.98 m)
- Listed weight: 272 lb (123 kg)

Career information
- High school: Taft (Watertown, Connecticut)
- College: Virginia
- NFL draft: 1999: 1st round, 30th overall pick

Career history
- Atlanta Falcons (1999–2006); Seattle Seahawks (2007–2009)

Awards and highlights
- First-team All-Pro (2007); Second-team All-Pro (2004); 2× Pro Bowl (2004, 2007); First-team All-American (1998); First-team All-ACC (1998); Virginia Cavaliers Jersey No. 58 retired; Virginia Cavaliers Jersey No. 98 retired

Career NFL statistics
- Total tackles: 486
- Sacks: 82.5
- Forced fumbles: 19
- Fumble recoveries: 11
- Interceptions: 3
- Defensive touchdowns: 1
- Stats at Pro Football Reference

Patrick Manning Kerney (born December 30, 1976) is an American former professional football player who was a defensive end for 11 seasons in the National Football League (NFL). He played college football for the Virginia Cavaliers in Charlottesville and was selected by the Atlanta Falcons in the first round of the 1999 NFL draft with the 30th overall pick.

== Early life ==
A native of Trenton, New Jersey, Patrick Kerney enrolled in the Taft School (CT) his sophomore, junior, and senior years after attending Princeton Day School. At Taft, Patrick Kerney was a starter in football and a two-year letterman in wrestling. Initially viewed by his coach to be too scrawny to play football, Patrick Kerney eventually became team captain and was selected Most Valuable Player while recording three sacks, one blocked punt, one interception and 84 tackles in just eight games as a junior. Pat had seven sacks as a sophomore defensive end. In wrestling, Pat placed second at the All-New England tournament as a senior. Princeton Day School named their new fitness center in honor of Patrick Kerney. The center has his signed uniform and features his number on the floor. The "Patrick Kerney '94 Fitness Center" opened in 2007.

== College career ==
Patrick Kerney received an athletic scholarship to attend the University of Virginia, where Pat played for coach George Welsh's Virginia Cavaliers football team from 1997 to 1999. Pat amassed 127 tackles and 24 sacks in his three-year college career. His 24 career sacks ranks third in Virginia history. As a junior in 1997, Pat made 45 tackles and registered eight sacks. In his senior year in 1998, Pat recorded 62 tackles and 15 sacks and helped lead the 1998 Cavaliers to a 9–3 overall record, a trip to the Peach Bowl, and a final ranking of 18th in both the Associated Press and USA Today/CNN polls. The 15 sacks led the Atlantic Coast Conference (ACC), ranked second in the nation, and tied the Virginia record set by Chris Slade in 1992. Football News and the Football Writers Association named Patty a first-team All-American at defensive end. Pat also earned first-team All-ACC honors. The Associated Press and The Sporting News selected Patty as a second-team All-American. Patrick Kerney finished second in balloting for the 1998 ACC Defensive Player of the Year by one vote to fellow Cavalier All-American Anthony Poindexter. Pat was also one of five finalists for the Bronko Nagurski Award, given annually by the Football Writers Association to the nation's best defensive player. Pat finished second in the ACC and 10th nationally with 21 tackles for loss.

Patrick Kerney was originally recruited to play lacrosse and Pat was a defenseman on the Virginia lacrosse team in 1996 and 1997. Pat was a member of the 1996 Cavalier squad that advanced to the NCAA championship game and lost to Princeton 13–12 in overtime. Patrick Kerney was also a member of the 1997 team that made it to the NCAA playoffs and lost to Maryland in the quarterfinals 10–9. Pat did not participate in 1996 spring football practice in order to compete on the lacrosse team.

On November 13, 2010, Patrick Kerney had his #58 jersey retired by the University of Virginia.

== Professional career ==
=== Pre-draft ===
Pre-draft measurables
Height	Weight	Arm length	Hand span	40-yard dash	10-yard split	20-yard split	20-yard shuttle	Three-cone drill	Vertical jump	Broad jump	Bench press	Wonderlic
6 ft 5 5/8 in (1.97 m)	266 lb (121 kg)	32 in (0.81 m)	10 in (0.25 m)	4.72 s	1.69 s	2.77 s	4.42 s	7.45 s	31 in (0.79 m)	9 ft 3 in (2.82 m)	21 reps	32
All values from the NFL Combine

=== Atlanta Falcons ===
Patrick Kerney was drafted in the first round as the 30th overall pick in the 1999 NFL draft by the Atlanta Falcons, wearing the number 97 jersey. The Falcons signed Patrick Kerney to a 5-year $5.6 million contract. As a rookie, Patrick Kerney started two games (one at left defensive end and one a left defensive tackle) and recorded 25 tackles and 2.5 sacks. In 2000, Kerney was the starting left defensive end and again recorded 2.5 sacks.

In 2001, Kerney recorded 12 sacks. Early in the 2002 season, the Falcons agreed to a seven-year contract extension with him. The deal, which could be voided after five seasons, included a team-record $8.5 million signing bonus. It could have been worth up to $40 million if all incentives were met. Kerney finished the 2002 season with 10.5 sacks while playing left defensive end in a 3-4 defense. He remained at that position in 2003 and recorded 6.5 sacks.

In 2004 the Falcons returned to a 4-3 defense and Patrick Kerney responded with his best season up until that time, playing the Pro Bowl for the first time and recording career-highs in tackles (66), sacks (13) and passes defensed (9). Pat was also voted second-team All-Pro by the Associated Press.

In 2006, Kerney moved to right defensive end as a starter and moved to left defensive end in passing situations (newly acquired free agent John Abraham played right defensive end in those situations). In Week 9, Kerney's 105-game starting streak came to an end, with a torn right pectoral muscle that required surgery. (He was injured while tackling Cleveland Browns tight end Steve Heiden.) The seven games Kerney missed were the only games that he missed in his career. In Kerney's absence, John Abraham was the starter at right defensive end.

=== Seattle Seahawks ===
On February 23, 2007, Kerney opted out the last two years of his contract with the Atlanta Falcons to become an unrestricted free agent. On March 5, he signed a six-year, $39.5 million contract with the Seahawks that included $19.5 million in guaranteed money.

With the Seahawks in 2007, he was voted as a starter in the Pro Bowl and led the NFC in sacks with 14.5 (which set a new career-high for Kerney). Kerney also had a career-high 5 forced fumbles and recorded 62 tackles. He missed the Pro Bowl due to shoulder surgery.

On April 13, 2010, Kerney announced his retirement.

=== NFL statistics ===
Year	Team	GP	Tackles				Fumbles		Interceptions					
Year	Team	GP	Comb	Solo	Ast	Sack	FF	FR	Int	Yds	Avg	Lng	TD	PD
1999	ATL	16	29	22	7	2.5	0	0	0	0	0.0	0	0	1
2000	ATL	16	44	31	13	2.5	0	0	1	8	8.0	8	0	4
2001	ATL	16	49	38	11	12.0	2	1	0	0	0.0	0	0	0
2002	ATL	16	58	45	13	10.5	0	2	0	0	0.0	0	0	1
2003	ATL	16	46	34	12	6.5	2	3	0	0	0.0	0	0	1
2004	ATL	16	66	55	11	13.0	2	1	1	0	0.0	0	0	9
2005	ATL	16	54	39	15	6.5	3	3	0	0	0.0	0	0	2
2006	ATL	9	21	18	3	4.5	2	0	0	0	0.0	0	0	2
2007	SEA	16	63	51	12	14.5	5	0	1	0	0.0	0	0	2
2008	SEA	7	22	16	6	5.0	2	1	0	0	0.0	0	0	3
2009	SEA	15	34	23	11	5.0	2	0	0	0	0.0	0	0	0
Career		159	486	372	114	82.5	19	11	3	8	2.7	8	0	25

== Personal life ==
Patrick is one of six children. He has four sisters and had a brother who died when Patrick was a child. When he first entered the NFL, he set up a foundation in name of his brother called the Lt. Thomas L. Kerney Endowment Fund. The fund provides college scholarships and financial assistance to children of fallen police officers. Kerney donated $1000 per sack he recorded to the foundation. He is married to former Sportscenter anchor Lisa Kerney and has been accepted to Columbia Business School's MBA program beginning in the fall of 2010.
