= Chris Draft =

American football player (born 1976)

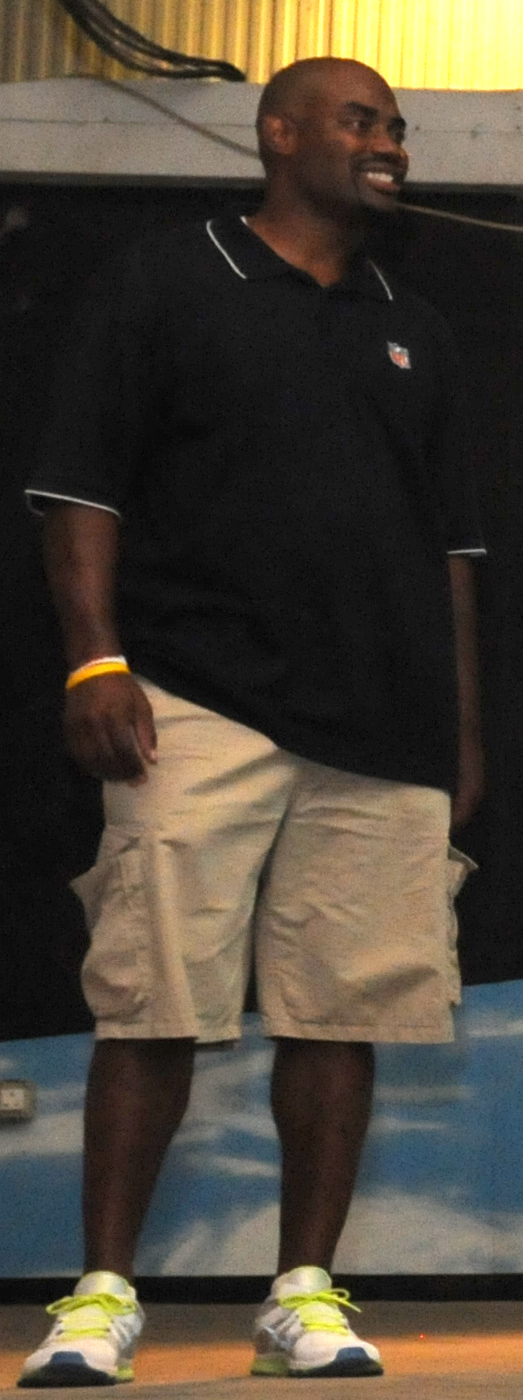
- Draft answers questions from the 380th Air Expeditionary Wing in 2012

No. 96, 57, 54, 52
- Position: Linebacker

Personal information
- Born: February 26, 1976 (age 50); Anaheim, California, U.S.
- Listed height: 5 ft 11 in (1.80 m)
- Listed weight: 234 lb (106 kg)

Career information
- High school: Placentia (CA) Valencia
- College: Stanford
- NFL draft: 1998: 6th round, 157th overall pick

Career history
- Chicago Bears (1998); San Francisco 49ers (1999); Atlanta Falcons (2000–2004); Carolina Panthers (2005–2006); St. Louis Rams (2007–2008); Buffalo Bills (2009); Washington Redskins (2010)*
- * Offseason or practice squad member only

Awards and highlights
- 2× Second-team All-Pac-10 (1996, 1997)

Career NFL statistics
- Total tackles: 690
- Sacks: 16
- Forced fumbles: 7
- Fumble recoveries: 7
- Interceptions: 5
- Stats at Pro Football Reference

Christopher Michael Draft (born February 26, 1976) is an American former professional football player who was a linebacker in the National Football League (NFL). He played college football for the Stanford Cardinal. Draft played in the NFL for the Chicago Bears, San Francisco 49ers, Atlanta Falcons, Carolina Panthers, St. Louis Rams, and Buffalo Bills.

== Early life ==
Draft was an All-American in football and baseball at Kraemer Middle School and Valencia High School in Placentia, California. He played running back and linebacker during his prep career. He was an honors student and a member of the school's ASB Leadership organization.

== College career ==
He was a four-year letter winner and a three-year starter at inside linebacker at Stanford University. He started his Cardinal career as a true freshman playing strong safety. As a two-time Second-team All-Pacific-10 Conference selection, he totaled 316 career tackles, six sacks and two interceptions. As a senior in 1997, he earned Second-team All-Pac-10 honors and led the Cardinal with 81 tackles and contributed two sacks and two interceptions. He graduated from Stanford with a degree in economics.

== Professional career ==
=== Chicago Bears ===
Draft was selected in the sixth round (157th overall) of the 1998 NFL draft by the Chicago Bears and appeared in one game, was inactive for three contests and spent 12 games on the Bears practice squad. On 30 August 1998 he was waived by Chicago prior to the start of the regular season and signed to practice squad by the Bears on 1 September 1998 before being promoted to the active roster on 2 December.

=== San Francisco 49ers ===
On 29 September 1999 Draft was signed to practice squad by the 49ers, where he spent six contests before being signed to the active roster on 20 November 1999. He saw action in seven games, mainly on special teams, for the San Francisco 49ers and notched seven special teams stops.

=== Atlanta Falcons ===
Claimed off waivers by the Atlanta Falcons on 11 February 2000 after being waved by San Francisco on 10 February 2000. He played in 13 games with eight starts with the Falcons and registered 67 tackles, one sack and one special teams tackle. In 2001 Draft played in 13 games with 10 starts at weakside linebacker and made 73 tackles, one pass deflection and three special teams stops. The next season, 2002, he played 15 games with five starts and had 66 tackles and a then career-high 3.5 sacks. In 2003, he started all 16 games for the first time of career and established a career-high in tackles with 124. In 2004 Draft moved to middle linebacker from weakside linebacker as Atlanta switched to a 4-3 defense from a 3–4. He played in 14 games with 13 starts and posted 56 tackles, one forced fumble, one interception and three passes deflected.

=== Carolina Panthers ===
Draft was signed by Carolina in early 2005. Played in all 16 games in first season in Carolina, also seeing action in all three postseason contests. In 2006, he started all 16 games for the second time of his career and he made 107 tackles and had 5.5 sacks.

=== St. Louis Rams ===
On March 19, 2007, he signed a three-year contract with the Rams. He played in all 16 games with six starts in his first season with the Rams and registered 50 tackles (40 solo) including 1.0 sack. His 14 special teams tackles ranked fourth on team. Seven of his starts came in place of an injured Pisa Tinoisamoa. In 2008, he made 38 tackles and 2 pass deflections. He was released from the Rams on September 10, 2009.

=== Buffalo Bills ===
On October 13, 2009, the day that the Buffalo Bills placed starting linebacker Kawika Mitchell on the IR with a knee injury, Buffalo signed Draft to a one-year contract. With Buffalo, the linebacker played in 11 games with three starts. He registered 43 tackles and 1 interception on defense and added 5 stops on special teams. He was a free agent after that season.

=== Washington Redskins ===
On May 7, 2010, the Washington Redskins signed Draft to a one-year contract. On August 23, 2010, Draft was released.

== NFL career statistics ==
Legend
**Bold**	Career high

=== Regular season ===
Year	Team	Games		Tackles				Interceptions				Fumbles			
Year	Team	GP	GS	Comb	Solo	Ast	Sck	Int	Yds	TD	Lng	FF	FR	Yds	TD
1998	CHI	1	0	0	0	0	0.0	0	0	0	0	0	0	0	0
1999	SFO	7	0	5	4	1	0.0	0	0	0	0	0	0	0	0
2000	ATL	13	8	57	42	15	1.0	0	0	0	0	0	0	0	0
2001	ATL	13	10	73	54	19	0.0	0	0	0	0	0	0	0	0
2002	ATL	15	5	69	53	16	3.5	**2**	12	0	9	**2**	**2**	0	0
2003	ATL	16	16	**125**	**104**	21	2.0	1	4	0	4	1	1	0	0
2004	ATL	14	13	57	42	15	0.0	1	**33**	0	**33**	1	0	0	0
2005	CAR	16	3	53	44	9	2.0	0	0	0	0	1	**2**	0	0
2006	CAR	16	16	110	82	**28**	**5.5**	0	0	0	0	**2**	**2**	**8**	0
2007	STL	16	6	58	48	10	1.0	0	0	0	0	0	0	0	0
2008	STL	12	9	38	33	5	0.0	0	0	0	0	0	0	0	0
2009	BUF	11	3	45	31	14	1.0	1	0	0	0	0	0	0	0
		150	89	690	537	153	16.0	5	49	0	33	7	7	8	0

=== Playoffs ===
Year	Team	Games		Tackles				Interceptions				Fumbles			
Year	Team	GP	GS	Comb	Solo	Ast	Sck	Int	Yds	TD	Lng	FF	FR	Yds	TD
2002	ATL	2	2	**10**	7	**3**	0.0	0	0	0	0	0	0	0	0
2004	ATL	2	2	2	2	0	0.0	0	0	0	0	0	0	0	0
2005	CAR	3	0	**10**	**8**	2	0.0	0	0	0	0	0	0	0	0
		7	4	22	17	5	0.0	0	0	0	0	0	0	0	0

== Career highlights ==
2008 Byron “Whizzer” White Award Finalist
2007 NFL Alumni "Spirit Award" 2006 Man of the Year – Carolina Panthers
2004 Byron “Whizzer” White Award Finalist
Career best 178 tackles (110 solo) in 2003
Host of his own Atlanta Metro Area television show "The Draft Report"
2002 Ed Block Courage Award
2001 Rankin Smith Award

National Service Projects
2007 Spokesperson: Climb California
2006 spokesperson: American Lung Association – Southeast region
2004 Hosted youth clinic for 50 children in Germany
2004 Visit with war veterans in Palo Alto, CA
Stanford University Athletic Department mentor
Orangewood (CA) Children's Home Black History Awareness
Sun Coast Big Brothers Big Sisters Annual Fundraiser participant

Community Sports Activities
2004 Boys and Girls Club football clinic
2004 Host of Project Fit America
2004 Prison Ministries of Atlanta football camp
2005/04 Flacons Fitness Challenge
2003/04 Co-host of Falcons “Thank the Fans” event
2003/04 Falcons Draft Day Fan Fest

Community Service Projects
2006 American Lung Association Asthma Walk and Camp Breathe Easy
2006 Founder of The Chris Draft Family Foundation
2005 Sponsor of the Zap Asthma summer camp
2004 Center for Disease Control “Steps for a Healthier U.S. Initiative”
2004 Atlanta Business Women's dinner
2004 Falcons Football Academy
2004 Atlanta Braves Ball Boy Mentoring Program
2004 NFL Yet Center Extra Yard partnership
2003/04 NFL Yet Center spokesperson

== Personal life ==
Draft met Keasha Rutledge in 2006. They were married 5 years later, on November 27, 2011. She died of lung cancer on December 27, 2011.
