= Jessie Tuggle =

American football player (born 1965)

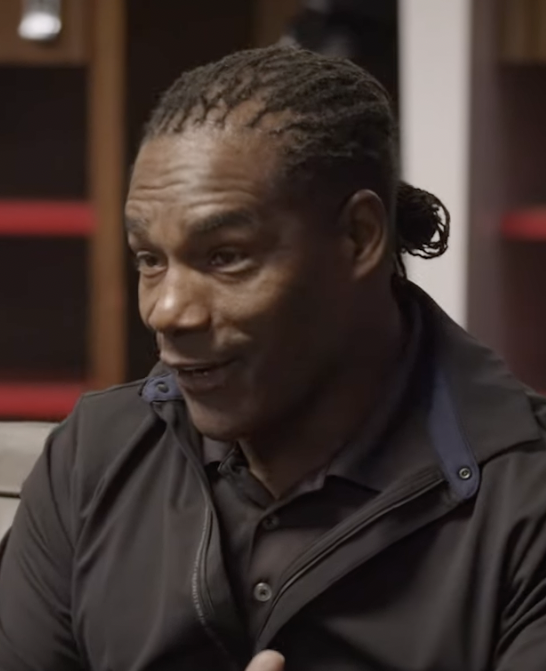
- Tuggle in 2021

No. 58
- Position: Linebacker

Personal information
- Born: April 4, 1965 (age 61); Griffin, Georgia, U.S.
- Listed height: 5 ft 11 in (1.80 m)
- Listed weight: 232 lb (105 kg)

Career information
- High school: Griffin
- College: Valdosta State (1983–1986)
- NFL draft: 1987: undrafted

Career history
- Atlanta Falcons (1987–2000)

Awards and highlights
- Second-team All-Pro (1998); 5× Pro Bowl (1992, 1994, 1995, 1997, 1998); 4× NFL combined tackles leader (1990–1992, 1995); Atlanta Falcons Ring of Honor; GSC Defensive Player of the Year (1986); Valdosta State No. 88 retired

Career NFL statistics
- Tackles: 1,809
- Sacks: 21
- Interceptions: 6
- Stats at Pro Football Reference
- College Football Hall of Fame

Jessie Lloyd Tuggle Jr. (born April 4, 1965) is an American former professional football player who spent his entire career as a linebacker for the Atlanta Falcons of the National Football League (NFL) from 1987 to 2000. He played college football for the Valdosta State Blazers. He appeared in the Pro Bowl five times, and played in Super Bowl XXXIII. His nickname is "the Hammer", because of the impact of his tackles.

== Early life ==
Tuggle was born in 1965 in Spalding County, Georgia, and attended Griffin High School. He played football at Griffin as an outside linebacker and offensive guard.

Tuggle was considered "too small" (five-foot-10 and 180 pounds) and "too slow" to play Division I college football. He was not recruited by any Division I programs and received only two Division II offers. He accepted an offer from Valdosta State University and was a four-year starter at linebacker from 1983 to 1986. He broke Valdosta's career record with 340 tackles. He was a three-time All-Gulf South Conference selection and his No. 88 was retired less than a decade after Tuggle left.

In 2007, he was inducted into the College Football Hall of Fame.

== Atlanta Falcons ==
After going undrafted, Tuggle signed with the Atlanta Falcons through a chance encounter. During training camp, myriad injuries at linebacker gave Tuggle playing time and a shot at making the roster (which he did).

After being a role player his rookie season, he recorded 108 tackles by virtue of eight starts. Becoming a bona fide star on the Atlanta defense, marked by the 1989-1993 period in which Tuggle racked up 969 tackles. During that stretch, he made his first Pro Bowl appearance in 1992. Even while the Falcons languished, Tuggle never thought of leaving in free agency, even when he would meet former teammates like Brett Favre. This endeared him to many Atlanta fans, who consider him one of the greatest and most beloved Falcons of all time.

After being with the Falcons through some tough years, the high point in Tuggle's career was 1998, when he played in Super Bowl XXXIII and was voted to the Pro Bowl.

Tuggle retired during training camp in 2001 after injuries plagued the end of his career.

In his 14 NFL seasons, Tuggle appeared in 209 games (189 as a starter) and recorded 1,640 tackles (164 assisted), 21 sacks, six interceptions, which he returned for 106 yards and a touchdown, 10 forced fumbles and 37 pass deflections. He also recovered 10 fumbles, returning them for 155 yards and five touchdowns.

He and his former teammate Clay Matthews Jr. are the only two players to lead the NFL in tackles four times. Tuggle also holds the record for most tackles from 1990 to 1999 with 1,293. At the time of his retirement, he held the NFL record for touchdowns via fumble recoveries with five.

== NFL career statistics ==
Legend
| | Led the league |
| **Bold** | Career high |

=== Regular season ===
| Year | Team | Games | | Tackles | | | | Interceptions | | | Fumbles | |
| Year | Team | GP | GS | Cmb | Solo | Ast | Sck | Int | Yds | TD | FF | FR |
|---|---|---|---|---|---|---|---|---|---|---|---|---|
| 1987 | ATL | 12 | 4 | 35 | – | – | 1.0 | 0 | 0 | 0 | 0 | 0 |
| 1988 | ATL | **16** | 8 | 103 | – | – | 0.0 | 0 | 0 | 0 | 1 | 1 |
| 1989 | ATL | **16** | **16** | 183 | – | – | 1.0 | 0 | 0 | 0 | 0 | 0 |
| 1990 | ATL | **16** | 14 | 201 | – | – | **5.0** | 0 | 0 | 0 | **3** | **2** |
| 1991 | ATL | **16** | **16** | **207** | – | – | 1.0 | 1 | 21 | 0 | 1 | **2** |
| 1992 | ATL | 15 | 15 | 193 | – | – | 1.0 | 1 | 1 | 0 | 1 | 1 |
| 1993 | ATL | **16** | **16** | 185 | – | – | 2.0 | 0 | 0 | 0 | 1 | 1 |
| 1994 | ATL | **16** | **16** | 129 | 93 | 36 | 0.0 | 1 | 0 | 0 | 0 | 1 |
| 1995 | ATL | **16** | **16** | 152 | **111** | **41** | 1.0 | **3** | **84** | **1** | 1 | 0 |
| 1996 | ATL | **16** | **16** | 114 | 96 | 18 | 1.0 | 0 | 0 | 0 | 1 | 0 |
| 1997 | ATL | **16** | 15 | 92 | 69 | 23 | 1.5 | 0 | 0 | 0 | 0 | 0 |
| 1998 | ATL | **16** | **16** | 86 | 66 | 20 | 3.0 | 0 | 0 | 0 | 1 | 1 |
| 1999 | ATL | 14 | 14 | 92 | 71 | 21 | 3.5 | 0 | 0 | 0 | 0 | 0 |
| 2000 | ATL | 8 | 7 | 33 | 26 | 7 | 0.0 | 0 | 0 | 0 | 0 | 0 |
| Career | | 209 | 189 | 1,805 | 532 | 166 | 21.0 | 6 | 106 | 1 | 10 | 10 |

== Personal life ==
Tuggle's oldest son, Justin Tuggle, played at Kansas State University and is a former linebacker in the NFL and Canadian Football League. He participated in the 2013 NFL draft, but was undrafted, and eventually signed with the Houston Texans.

His youngest son, Grady Jarrett, played defensive end in college football at Clemson University. Jarrett went on to be selected as the first pick in the 5th round (137th overall) of the 2015 NFL draft by his father's former team, the Atlanta Falcons.

Tuggle has experienced some concussion-related symptoms like memory loss.
