= Quentin McCord =

American gridiron football player (1978–2020)

No. 15, 23, 80, 88
- Position: Wide receiver

Personal information
- Born: June 26, 1978; LaGrange, Georgia, U.S.
- Died: August 13, 2020 (aged 42); Lexington, Kentucky, U.S.
- Listed height: 5 ft 10 in (1.78 m)
- Listed weight: 188 lb (85 kg)

Career information
- High school: LaGrange (GA)
- College: Kentucky
- NFL draft: 2001: 7th round, 236th overall pick

Career history
- Atlanta Falcons (2001–2003); Oakland Raiders (2004)*; Georgia Force (2006)*; Winnipeg Blue Bombers (2006–2007); Edmonton Eskimos (2007–2008); Kentucky Horsemen (2009)
- * Offseason or practice squad member only

Career NFL statistics
- Receptions: 23
- Receiving yards: 427
- Receiving TDs: 1
- Kickoff returns - yards: 3 - 78
- Punt returns - yards: 1 - 46
- Tackles: 7
- Stats at Pro Football Reference

Career CFL statistics
- Receptions: 23
- Receiving yards: 296
- Receiving TDs: 0
- Kickoff returns - yards: 1 - 18
- Tackles: 4
- Stats at CFL.ca (archived)
- Stats at ArenaFan.com

John Quentin McCord (June 26, 1978 – August 13, 2020) was an American professional football player who was a wide receiver in the National Football League (NFL) and Canadian Football League (CFL). He was drafted in the seventh round of the 2001 NFL draft by the Atlanta Falcons. He played college football at Kentucky.

In his career, McCord also played with the Oakland Raiders, Winnipeg Blue Bombers, Edmonton Eskimos. He finished his career playing arena football with the Kentucky Horsemen in the AF2.

== College career ==
McCord attended the University of Kentucky where he is considered one of the first players in the "LaGrange pipeline". At Kentucky, he recorded 1,743 career receiving yards, ranking fourth all-time among Kentucky receivers.

== Professional career ==
=== National Football League ===
McCord was selected in the seventh round (236th overall) of the 2001 NFL draft by the Atlanta Falcons, where he played for three seasons. While playing for the Falcons, he recorded 23 receptions for 427 yards and a touchdown. The best statistical year of his career came in 2002, when he recorded 11 receptions for 253 yards and one touchdown. He also played as a kick and punt returner. He then spent part of the 2004 season on the practice squad of the Oakland Raiders.

=== Canadian Football League ===
McCord was out of football in 2005; however, he signed with the Winnipeg Blue Bombers of the Canadian Football League in 2006. On April 20, he re-signed with the Blue Bombers, however, he was later released. On September 2, McCord was signed by the Edmonton Eskimos. He was released, and then re-signed on October 2. He remained with the club until April 10, 2008, when he was released a final time.

=== af2 ===
In 2009, McCord joined Arena Football League's developmental league af2 and was assigned to the Kentucky Horsemen.

== Personal life ==
McCord died on August 13, 2020, at the age of 42.
