= Henri Crockett =

American football player (born 1974)

No. 94, 52
- Position: Linebacker

Personal information
- Born: October 28, 1974 (age 52); Pompano Beach, Florida, U.S.
- Listed height: 6 ft 2 in (1.88 m)
- Listed weight: 238 lb (108 kg)

Career information
- High school: Blanche Ely (Pompano Beach)
- College: Florida State
- NFL draft: 1997: 4th round, 100th overall pick

Career history
- Atlanta Falcons (1997–2000); Denver Broncos (2001)*; Atlanta Falcons (2001); Minnesota Vikings (2002–2003); Oakland Raiders (2006)*
- * Offseason or practice squad member only

Awards and highlights
- National champion (1993)

Career NFL statistics
- Tackles: 288
- Sacks: 7.5
- Forced fumbles: 2
- Fumble recoveries: 2
- Interceptions: 1
- Stats at Pro Football Reference

Henri Woodrau Crockett (born October 28, 1974) is an American former professional football player. He attended Blanche Ely High School in Pompano Beach, Florida. As a youth, Crockett was recognized as an All-American Athlete in Parade Magazine's Super Prep and Football Report. He earned an athletic scholarship and played linebacker at Florida State University. He was a member of the Seminole's 1993 NCAA Division I National Championship team and was also part of the team that won five back to back Atlantic Coast Conference Championships from 1993 to 1997. After graduating from college with a Bachelor of Arts in Criminology he was selected by the Atlanta Falcons in the fourth round of the 1997 NFL draft. He started in Super Bowl XXXIII in 1999 with the Falcons, where they were defeated by the Denver Broncos. In 2002, Crockett was traded to the Minnesota Vikings. His brother, Zack Crockett, played fullback with the Oakland Raiders.

Crockett is a member of Omega Psi Phi fraternity.

== NFL career statistics ==
Legend
**Bold**	Career high

=== Regular season ===
Year	Team	Games		Tackles				Interceptions				Fumbles			
Year	Team	GP	GS	Comb	Solo	Ast	Sck	Int	Yds	TD	Lng	FF	FR	Yds	TD
1997	ATL	16	10	30	26	4	**2.0**	0	0	0	0	0	**1**	0	0
1998	ATL	10	10	29	22	7	1.0	0	0	0	0	**1**	0	0	0
1999	ATL	16	14	42	30	12	1.5	0	0	0	0	0	0	0	0
2000	ATL	15	12	40	35	5	**2.0**	0	0	0	0	**1**	0	0	0
2001	ATL	16	15	52	44	8	0.0	**1**	**7**	0	**7**	0	0	0	0
2002	MIN	14	11	**61**	**47**	**14**	1.0	0	0	0	0	0	**1**	0	0
2003	MIN	16	15	34	32	2	0.0	0	0	0	0	0	0	0	0
		103	87	288	236	52	7.5	1	7	0	7	2	2	0	0

=== Playoffs ===
Year	Team	Games		Tackles				Interceptions				Fumbles			
Year	Team	GP	GS	Comb	Solo	Ast	Sck	Int	Yds	TD	Lng	FF	FR	Yds	TD
1998	ATL	3	3	9	7	2	0.0	0	0	0	0	0	0	0	0
		3	3	9	7	2	0.0	0	0	0	0	0	0	0	0
