= Corey Atkins =

American football player (born 1976)

No. 50
- Position: Linebacker

Personal information
- Born: November 11, 1976 (age 49); Greenville, South Carolina
- Listed height: 6 ft 0 in (1.83 m)
- Listed weight: 235 lb (107 kg)

Career information
- High school: Southside High School (Greenville, South Carolina)
- College: South Carolina

Career history
- Atlanta Falcons (2000); Barcelona Dragons (2001)
- Stats at Pro Football Reference

Corey J. Atkins (born November 11, 1976) is an American former football linebacker who played one season with the Atlanta Falcons of the National Football League. He also played for the Barcelona Dragons of NFL Europe for one season.
