= Corey Hall (American football) =

American football player (born 1979)

No. 28
- Position: Safety

Personal information
- Born: January 17, 1979 (age 47); Athens, Georgia, U.S.
- Listed height: 6 ft 4 in (1.93 m)
- Listed weight: 203 lb (92 kg)

Career information
- High school: Clarke Central (Athens)
- College: Appalachian State (1997–2000)
- NFL draft: 2001: 7th round, 215th overall pick

Career history
- Atlanta Falcons (2001); New Orleans Saints (2002–2003)*
- * Offseason or practice squad member only

Career NFL statistics
- Games played: 3
- Stats at Pro Football Reference

Corey Hall (born January 17, 1979) is an American former professional football player who was a safety for one season for the Atlanta Falcons of the National Football League (NFL). He played in three games. He played college football for the Appalachian State Mountaineers and was selected in the seventh round of the 2001 NFL draft.
