= Shawn Swayda =

American football player (born 1974)

No. 93
- Position: Defensive end

Personal information
- Born: September 4, 1974 (age 52); Phoenix, Arizona, U.S.
- Listed height: 6 ft 5 in (1.96 m)
- Listed weight: 290 lb (132 kg)

Career information
- High school: Brophy College Preparatory (Phoenix)
- College: Arizona State (1992–1996)
- NFL draft: 1997: 6th round, 196th overall pick

Career history
- Chicago Bears (1997)*; Dallas Cowboys (1997)*; Detroit Lions (1997)*; Atlanta Falcons (1998–2001)
- * Offseason or practice squad member only

Career NFL statistics
- Tackles: 51
- Sacks: 1.5
- Passes defended: 1
- Stats at Pro Football Reference

Shawn Gerald Swayda (born September 4, 1974) is an American former professional football player who was a defensive end for four seasons with the Atlanta Falcons of the National Football League (NFL). He was selected by the Chicago Bears in the sixth round of the 1997 NFL draft after playing college football for the Arizona State Sun Devils.

== Early life and college ==
Shawn Gerald Swayda was born on September 4, 1974, in Phoenix, Arizona. He attended Brophy College Preparatory in Phoenix.

Swayda was a member of the Sun Devils of Arizona State University from 1992 to 1996 and a four-year letterman from 1993 to 1996.

== Professional career ==
Swayda was selected by the Chicago Bears in the sixth round, with the 196th overall pick, of the 1997 NFL draft. He officially signed with the team on July 10. He was released on August 18, 1997.

Swayda was signed to the practice squad of the Dallas Cowboys on October 9, 1997 before being released on November 4, 1997.

He was signed to the practice squad of the Detroit Lions on November 24, 1997. He became a free agent after the 1997 season.

Swayda signed with the Atlanta Falcons on March 24, 1998. He played in five games for the Falcons in 1998, posting two solo tackles and one assisted tackle. He was released on September 17, 1999, but re-signed on September 30, 1999. Overall, Swayda appeared in four games during the 1999 season, recording three solo tackles and two assisted tackles. He played in all 16 games for the Falcons in 2000, totaling 25 solo tackles and nine assisted tackles. He became a free agent after the season and re-signed with the team on May 29, 2001. Swayda appeared in ten games that year, recording five solo tackles, four assisted tackles, and one pass breakup. He became a free agent again after the 2001 season.

== Personal life ==
Swayda's father, Wayne Swayda, played college football for the Washington State Cougars and professionally for the Seattle Rangers of the Continental Football League.
