= Joe DeCamillis =

American football coach (born 1965)

Las Vegas Raiders
- Title: Special teams coordinator

Personal information
- Born: June 29, 1965 (age 61); Arvada, Colorado, U.S.

Career information
- High school: Arvada (CO)
- College: Wyoming

Career history
- Denver Broncos (1991–1992) Assistant special teams coach; New York Giants (1993–1996) Special teams coach; Atlanta Falcons (1997–2006) Special teams coach; Jacksonville Jaguars (2007–2008) Special teams coach; Dallas Cowboys (2009–2012) Special teams coordinator; Chicago Bears (2013–2014) Assistant head coach & special teams coordinator; Denver Broncos (2015–2016) Special teams coordinator; Jacksonville Jaguars (2017–2020) Special teams coordinator; Los Angeles Rams (2021–2022) Special teams coordinator; Texas (2023) Special assistant to the head coach; South Carolina (2024–2025) Associate head coach & special teams coordinator; Las Vegas Raiders (2026–present) Special teams coordinator

Awards and highlights
- As a coach: 2× Super Bowl champion (50, LVI)

Joe DeCamillis (born June 29, 1965) is an American professional football coach who is the special teams coordinator for the Las Vegas Raiders of the National Football League (NFL). He was formerly the special teams coordinator in the NFL for the Los Angeles Rams for two seasons. Before that, he coached for the Chicago Bears, Dallas Cowboys, New York Giants, Atlanta Falcons, and Jacksonville Jaguars. DeCamillis was most recently the special teams coordinator for the South Carolina Gamecocks for two seasons.

== Wrestling career ==
DeCamillis did not play football in college. DeCamillis wrestled for the University of Wyoming where he was an All-American by virtue of finishing 8th at the 1988 NCAA Division I Wrestling Championships.

== Football coaching career ==
=== Early career ===
DeCamillis began his NFL career as an administrative assistant to his father-in-law, then Denver Broncos head coach Dan Reeves. In 1991, DeCamillis joined the coaching staff as a special teams assistant under Harold Richardson. When Reeves became head coach of the New York Giants in 1993, DeCamillis joined his staff as special teams coach. He followed Reeves again in 1997, becoming the special teams coach of the Atlanta Falcons. He was one of nine assistants retained by Reeves' successor Jim Mora. In 2007 he was hired to coach special teams for the Jacksonville Jaguars.

=== Dallas Cowboys ===
In 2009, DeCamillis joined the coaching staff of the Dallas Cowboys. He had previously worked with Cowboys head coach Wade Phillips in Denver and Atlanta. On May 2, 2009, the Dallas Cowboys practice facility collapsed during a wind storm. The collapse left DeCamillis and 11 other Cowboys players and coaches injured. DeCamillis and Rich Behm, the team's 33-year-old scouting assistant, received the most severe injuries. DeCamillis suffered fractured cervical vertebrae and had surgery to stabilize fractured vertebrae in his neck, and Behm was permanently paralyzed from the waist down after his spine was severed. DeCamillis received much praise from the media and fans in the months following the incident for continuing to coach in his high energy style, wearing a neck brace, only 9 days following the incident. He was finally able to remove the brace on August 10, 2009. The Cowboys gave him and Kyle Kosier the Ed Block Courage Award for 2009.

=== Chicago Bears ===
On January 16, 2013, DeCamillis was hired by the Bears. He had been interviewed by the Bears for their head coaching position, but was later hired as special teams coach and assistant head coach. On January 19, 2015, DeCamillis was replaced by Jeff Rodgers.

=== Denver Broncos ===
On January 20, 2015, DeCamillis was hired by the Denver Broncos.

On February 7, 2016, DeCamillis was part of the Broncos coaching staff that won Super Bowl 50. In the game, the Broncos defeated the Carolina Panthers by a score of 24–10.

On October 13, 2016, DeCamillis served as the interim head coach for Denver's game against the San Diego Chargers while Gary Kubiak was recovering from an illness. The Broncos lost 21–13 in his head coaching debut.

=== Jacksonville Jaguars ===
On January 13, 2017, DeCamillis was named as the special teams coordinator for the Jacksonville Jaguars.

=== Los Angeles Rams ===
He was hired by the Los Angeles Rams on January 21, 2021, as the special teams coordinator. DeCamillis won his second Super Bowl ring when the Rams defeated the Cincinnati Bengals in Super Bowl LVI. He was fired on January 18, 2023.

=== Texas ===
In 2023, DeCamillis joined the staff of the Texas Longhorns football team as a special assistant to the head coach.

=== South Carolina ===
In 2024, DeCamillis joined the staff of the South Carolina Gamecocks football team as associate head coach and special teams coordinator. Under his tutelage, punter Kai Kroeger was a First-Team All-American and First-Team All-SEC selection in 2024. Punt returner Vicari Swain was a Third-Team All-SEC and a Third-Team All-American per Phil Steele in 2025 after scoring three touchdowns off of punts (lead the nation).

=== Las Vegas Raiders ===
On February 16, 2026, Decamillis was hired by the Las Vegas Raiders as their special teams coordinator under head coach Klint Kubiak.

== Head coaching record ==
| Team | Year | Regular season | | | | | Postseason | | | |
| Team | Year | Won | Lost | Ties | Win % | Finish | Won | Lost | Win % | Result |
|---|---|---|---|---|---|---|---|---|---|---|
| DEN* | 2016 | 0 | 1 | 0 | .000 | – | – | – | – | – |
| Total | | 0 | 1 | 0 | .000 | | – | – | – | |

* Interim head coach

== Personal life ==
DeCamillis and his wife Dana have two children, Caitlin and Ashley. His wife is the daughter of former NFL coach Dan Reeves.
