= Don Blackmon =

American football player and coach (born 1958)

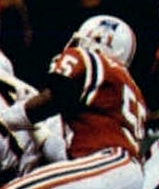
- Blackmon playing for the Patriots in Super Bowl XX

No. 55
- Position: Linebacker

Personal information
- Born: March 14, 1958 (age 68); Pompano Beach, Florida, U.S.
- Listed height: 6 ft 3 in (1.91 m)
- Listed weight: 235 lb (107 kg)

Career information
- High school: Boyd H. Anderson (Lauderdale Lakes, Florida)
- College: Tulsa
- NFL draft: 1981: 4th round, 102nd overall pick

Career history

Playing
- New England Patriots (1981–1987)

Coaching
- New England Patriots (1988) (Staff assistant); New England Patriots (1989–1990) (Linebackers coach); Cleveland Browns (1991) (Linebackers coach); New York Giants (1993–1996) (Linebackers coach); Atlanta Falcons (1997–2000) (Linebackers coach); Atlanta Falcons (2001) (Defensive coordinator); Buffalo Bills (2003–2005) (Linebackers coach); Kansas City Chiefs (2006–2007) (Linebackers coach); New York Sentinels (2009) (Defensive coordinator)

Awards and highlights
- New England Patriots All-1980s Team; 2× Second-team All-American (1978, 1980)

Career NFL statistics
- Sacks: 29.5
- Fumble recoveries: 6
- Interceptions: 5
- Stats at Pro Football Reference

Donald Kirk Blackmon (born March 14, 1958) is an American former professional football player and coach in the National Football League (NFL). He played in the NFL as a linebacker with the New England Patriots. Most recently he was the defensive coordinator for the New York Sentinels of the United Football League (UFL).

== Playing career ==
Blackmon was selected by the New England Patriots in the fourth round of the 1981 NFL draft. A 6'3". 235 lbs. linebacker from the University of Tulsa, Blackmon played his entire NFL career for the Patriots. He started 72 of 89 games and recorded 541 tackles, 30.5 sacks, and five interceptions before being forced to retire after a neck injury in a game against the Raiders in 1987. He was on the Patriots' AFC title team in the 1985 season and played in Super Bowl XX against the Chicago Bears. Blackmon was a three time all-conference selection at Tulsa and has been named to the school's Hall of Fame.
