= Travis Jervey =

American football player (born 1972)

No. 32, 36
- Position: Running back

Personal information
- Born: May 5, 1972 (age 54); Columbia, South Carolina, U.S.
- Listed height: 6 ft 0 in (1.83 m)
- Listed weight: 222 lb (101 kg)

Career information
- High school: Wando (Mount Pleasant, South Carolina)
- College: The Citadel
- NFL draft: 1995: 5th round, 170th overall pick

Career history
- Green Bay Packers (1995–1998); San Francisco 49ers (1999–2000); Atlanta Falcons (2001–2003)

Awards and highlights
- Super Bowl champion (XXXI); Pro Bowl (1997)

Career NFL statistics
- Rushing yards: 503
- Return yards: 843
- Touchdowns: 2
- Stats at Pro Football Reference

Travis Richard Jervey (born May 5, 1972) is an American former professional football player who was a running back in the National Football League (NFL). He played for the Green Bay Packers, San Francisco 49ers, and Atlanta Falcons. With the Packers, he won Super Bowl XXXI over the New England Patriots and participated in the 1998 Pro Bowl. He played college football for The Citadel Bulldogs.

== Early life ==
Jervey attended Wando High School in Mount Pleasant, South Carolina, and played collegiately at The Citadel in neighboring Charleston, where he was the backup to Everette Sands for three years. Jervey also considered playing for Hawaii, but that program only offered him a partial scholarship. During his senior season, Jervey set a school record with a 96-yard run against VMI in the Oyster Bowl. Jervey was later inducted into both The Citadel and South Carolina Athletic Hall of Fame.

== Professional career ==
=== Green Bay Packers ===
Jervey was a fifth round pick (170th overall) of the Packers in the 1995 NFL draft; lead scout John Dorsey suggested taking Terrell Davis with the pick but general manager Ron Wolf was worried about Davis' injury history and took Jervey instead. In the 1996 season, Jervey participated in the "NFL's Fastest Man" competition and placed fourth. After playing exclusively at running back in college, Jervey began playing on special teams with the Packers and made the 1998 Pro Bowl as a special teams player. In 1998, Jervey started five games in place of the injured Dorsey Levens before sustaining a broken ankle. As his rookie contract was up after 1998, the Jacksonville Jaguars originally offered Jervey a three-year contract but later rescinded; he re-signed on a one-year deal with the Packers.

=== San Francisco 49ers ===
In 1999, he signed a four-year free agent contract with the 49ers worth $6 million. While still recovering from a broken ankle, Jervey claimed to take testosterone shots, but the league said Jervey took steroids and suspended him for four games. In the 2000 season, Jervey returned kicks for the 49ers, but his season came to an early end after he suffered a broken collarbone against the St. Louis Rams. After reportedly taking a pay cut prior to the 1999 season, Jervey would not negotiate a lower level of compensation for the 2000 season and was released on March 19 in what was viewed as a move to save salary cap space.

=== Atlanta Falcons ===
Jervey signed with the Atlanta Falcons on May 1, 2001. He played in every game that year, mostly on special teams. He was re-signed for the 2002 season, but a torn anterior cruciate ligament ended his season in late October. His 2003 season with the Falcons was derailed by a neck sprain sustained late in the season.

== Personal life ==
While playing for the Packers, Jervey lived with teammate LeShon Johnson in Green Bay, Wisconsin. The two owned a pet lion named Nala after previously being dissuaded from owning a monkey. He was arrested for speeding in his Ferrari and marijuana possession in February 1998, but the marijuana charges were later dropped when it was determined that law enforcement misidentified a substance in his car. Jervey is married to a jewelry designer, and they have a son and a daughter. They live in Mt. Pleasant, SC. He is an avid surfer, and previously held land in Dominical, Puntarenas when he wintered in Costa Rica to ride waves.

Jervey returned to football in a one-off coaching appearance for the American team in the 2015 Medal of Honor Bowl.
