= George Sefcik =

American football player and coach (1939–2016)

Personal information
- Born: December 27, 1939; Cleveland, Ohio, US
- Died: January 23, 2016 (aged 76); Bradenton, Florida, US

Career information
- College: Notre Dame

Career history
- 1964–1968: University of Notre Dame (Wide Receivers)
- 1969–1972: University of Kentucky (Offensive Coordinator)
- 1973–1974: Baltimore Colts (Quarterbacks/Running Backs)
- 1975–1977: Cleveland Browns (Quarterbacks/Running Backs)
- 1978–1983: Cincinnati Bengals (Quarterbacks/Running Backs)
- 1984: Green Bay Packers (Running Backs)
- 1985: Green Bay Packers (Quarterbacks/Running Backs)
- 1986–1987: Green Bay Packers (Quarterbacks)
- 1988: Kansas City Chiefs (Offensive Coordinator)
- 1989–1990: Cleveland Browns (Running Backs)
- 1991: New York Giants (Wide Receivers)
- 1992–1996: New York Giants (Running Backs)
- 1997–2001: Atlanta Falcons (Offensive Coordinator/Running Backs)

George Sefcik (December 27, 1939 – January 23, 2016), was an American football coach. He was the offensive coordinator of the Kansas City Chiefs in 1988, and the Atlanta Falcons from 1997 through 2001. He coached in 2 Super Bowls - XXXIII with the Atlanta Falcons and XVI with the Cincinnati Bengals. He has a total of 29 years coaching experience in the National Football League as an assistant coach and offensive coordinator. He was also a college football coach and offensive coordinator for 9 years.

Sefcik played football and baseball (3 year lettermen) for the University of Notre Dame in South Bend, Indiana from 1959 through 1962.

Sefcik played football and baseball (3 year lettermen) for Benedictine High School in Cleveland, Ohio from 1955 through 1958. He was a member of the 1957 Benedictine football team state champions and played/started at 4 positions - left halfback (offense), safety (defense), kicker and punter (special teams).

Sefcik was married and had three children. He died on January 23, 2016.
