= Ron Moore (defensive tackle) =

American football player (born 1977)

No. 90
- Position: Defensive tackle

Personal information
- Born: August 10, 1977; Sanford, Florida, U.S.
- Died: May 31, 2015 (aged 37); Orange County, Florida, U.S.
- Listed height: 6 ft 2 in (1.88 m)
- Listed weight: 316 lb (143 kg)

Career information
- High school: Seminole (Sanford)
- College: Hinds (1996–1997); Northwestern Oklahoma State (1998–1999)
- NFL draft: 2000: 7th round, 229th overall pick

Career history
- Green Bay Packers (2000)*; Dallas Cowboys (2000)*; Atlanta Falcons (2000–2001); Dallas Cowboys (2003)*; Oakland Raiders (2004)*
- * Offseason or practice squad member only

Career NFL statistics
- Games played: 1
- Stats at Pro Football Reference

Ronald Demon Moore (August 10, 1977 – May 31, 2015) was an American professional football defensive tackle who played for the Atlanta Falcons of the National Football League (NFL). He played college football at Hinds Community College and Northwestern Oklahoma State. He was selected by the Green Bay Packers in the seventh round of the 2000 NFL draft but was waived before the start of the 2000 season. Moore was also a member of the Dallas Cowboys and Oakland Raiders but did not appear in any games for either team.

== Early life and college ==
Ronald Demon Moore was born on August 10, 1977 in Sanford, Florida. He attended Seminole High School in Sanford.

Moore first played college football at Hinds Community College from 1996 to 1997. He then transferred to play for the Northwestern Oklahoma State Rangers from 1998 to 1999.

== Professional career ==
=== Green Bay Packers ===
Moore was selected by the Green Bay Packers in the seventh round, with the 229th overall pick, of the 2000 NFL draft. He officially signed with the team on May 17. He was waived by the Packers on August 17, 2000.

=== Dallas Cowboys (first stint) ===
Moore was signed to the practice squad of the Dallas Cowboys on September 13, 2000. He was waived on September 26, 2000.

=== Atlanta Falcons ===
He was signed to the Atlanta Falcons' practice squad on November 8, 2000. He was promoted to the active roster on December 27 but did not play in the final two games of the season.

Moore was waived on September 2, 2001, and signed to the team's practice squad on September 11. He was promoted to the active roster on November 27 and played in one game for the Falcons during the 2001 season.

Moore re-signed with the Falcons on May 29, 2002. He was waived on September 1, 2002.

=== Dallas Cowboys (second stint) ===
Moore signed a reserve/future contract with the Cowboys on January 2, 2003. He was waived on June 5, 2003.

=== Oakland Raiders ===
Moore signed a reserve/future contract with the Oakland Raiders on January 9, 2004. He was waived on April 1, 2004.

== Personal life ==
Moore was later a football coach at his alma mater, Seminole High School. His son Ronnie Moore played college football for the Bowling Green Falcons.

On May 31, 2015, Moore and another man were shot and killed in Orange County, Florida. One other man was also injured during the shooting. The police believed the shooting was the result of a drug deal.
