= Darrick Vaughn =

American football player (born 1878)

Profile
- Positions: Defensive back, kick returner

Personal information
- Born: October 2, 1978 (age 48); Houston, Texas, U.S.

Career information
- High school: Aldine (TX) Nimitz
- College: Southwest Texas State (1996–1999)
- NFL draft: 2000: 7 / Pick 211th round

Career history
- 2000–2001: Atlanta Falcons
- 2003: Houston Texans

Awards and highlights
- Second team All-Pro (2000)
- Stats at Pro Football Reference

Darrick Leonard Vaughn (born October 2, 1978) is an American former professional football player who was a defensive back in the National Football League (NFL) for the Atlanta Falcons and the Houston Texans. He was selected by the Falcons in the seventh round of the 2000 NFL draft. He played college football at Southwest Texas State University.
