= Kynan Forney =

American football player (born 1978)

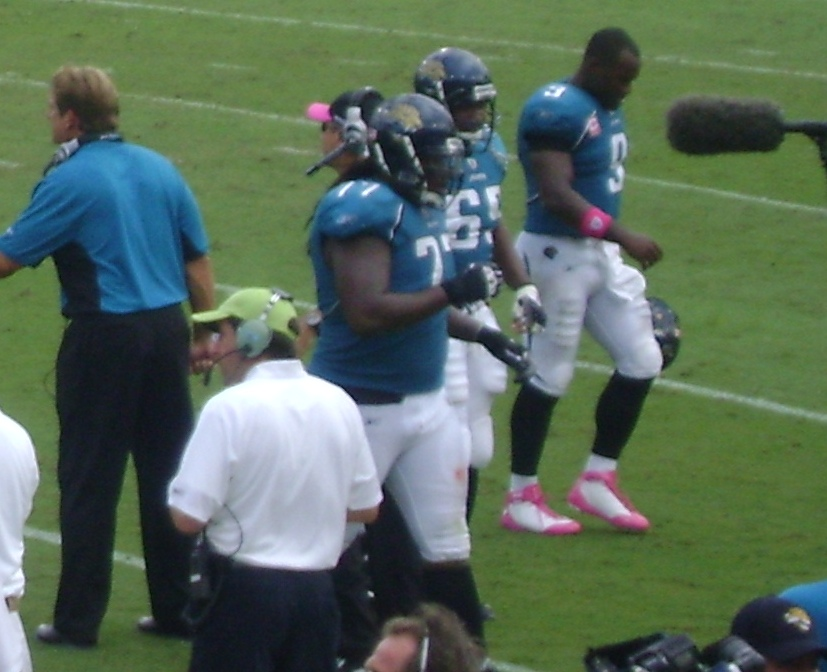
- Forney (middle, #65) with the Jacksonville Jaguars

No. 65, 67
- Position: Guard

Personal information
- Born: September 8, 1978 (age 48); Nacogdoches, Texas, U.S.
- Listed height: 6 ft 3 in (1.91 m)
- Listed weight: 302 lb (137 kg)

Career information
- High school: Nacogdoches (TX)
- College: Hawaii
- NFL draft: 2001: 7th round, 219th overall pick

Career history
- Atlanta Falcons (2001–2007); San Diego Chargers (2008); Jacksonville Jaguars (2009)

Awards and highlights
- All-WAC (2000)

Career NFL statistics
- Games played: 95
- Games started: 89
- Fumble recoveries: 1
- Stats at Pro Football Reference

Kynan Lerrol Forney (born September 8, 1978) is an American former professional football player. He was selected by the Atlanta Falcons in the seventh round of the 2001 NFL draft. He played college football at Hawaii. He also played for the San Diego Chargers.

== College career ==
Forney transferred to the University of Hawaii from Trinity Valley Community College in 1998. In 1997 won the JUCO National Championship at Trinity Valley Community College going 12-0 and was a 1st team all conference selection. . As a senior, Forney earned unanimous 1st team All-Western Athletic Conference honors. He started 11 games at right tackle, collecting 94 knockdown blocks, as the unit allowed only 10 sacks on the season. As a junior, Forney appeared in every game and made five starts. Was selected to play in the Senior Bowl All Star Game in Mobile, Alabama following his senior season at Hawaii. In 2012 was selected to the TVCC Cardinal Hall of Fame. No. 65 on the Honolulu Star Bulletins list of University of Hawaii All Time Greats.

== Professional career ==
=== Atlanta Falcons ===
Forney was selected in the latter part of the seventh round of the 2001 NFL draft by the Atlanta Falcons. Forney immediately made his way into the lineup, starting 8 of 12 games while missing four games due to a nagging toe injury suffered in the season opener. Forney started 68 of 80 career games with the Falcons and was a key part of an offensive line responsible for the NFL's top rushing attack in 2004 and 2005. In 2004 Forney was a 4th Alternate to the Pro Bowl and an ESPN All Pro Selection. In 2005, Forney was named as a Pro Bowl first-alternate. During the 2004 postseason, Forney was part of a line that set the fourth-highest NFL postseason record with 327 rushing yards, including a Falcons record 142 yards by Warrick Dunn and an NFL record for quarterbacks with Michael Vick collecting 119 yards on the ground.[1] Over his time in Atlanta, Forney made two playoff appearances and helped the Falcons win their first division title (2004) since 1998 including reaching the NFC Championship Game in 2004. Bleacher Reports Atlanta Falcons All Decade Team.

On August 29, 2008, the Falcons released Forney during final cuts.

=== San Diego Chargers ===
Two days after his release from the Falcons, Forney agreed to terms on a one-year contract with the San Diego Chargers on September 1, 2008. He remained with the team the entire season but did not appear in a game.

Scheduled to be an unrestricted free agent in the 2009 offseason, Forney was re-signed to a two-year, $4.8 million contract on February 25. However, he was released during final cuts on September 5.

=== Jacksonville Jaguars ===
Forney was signed by the Jacksonville Jaguars on September 8, 2009, with the team releasing offensive lineman Dennis Norman to make room on the roster. Forney was subsequently released by the Jaguars. He officially retired in 2010.
