= Antony Jordan =

American football player (born 1974)

No. 91, 55
- Position: Linebacker

Personal information
- Born: December 19, 1974 (age 51); Sewell, New Jersey, U.S.
- Listed height: 6 ft 3 in (1.91 m)
- Listed weight: 234 lb (106 kg)

Career information
- High school: Washington Township (Sewell)
- College: Vanderbilt
- NFL draft: 1998: 5th round, 135th overall pick

Career history
- Indianapolis Colts (1998); Chicago Bears (1999)*; Tampa Bay Buccaneers (2000)*; Philadelphia Eagles (2000)*; Atlanta Falcons (2000–2001)
- * Offseason or practice squad member only

Career NFL statistics
- Tackles: 7
- Stats at Pro Football Reference

Antony T. Jordan (born December 19, 1974) is an American former professional football player who played linebacker for the Indianapolis Colts and Atlanta Falcons. He was also a member of the Tampa Bay Buccaneers. He was selected in the fifth round of the 1998 NFL draft.

Jordan played prep football at Washington Township High School in Washington Township, Gloucester County, New Jersey.
