= Maurice Smith (running back) =

American football player (born 1977)

No. 43
- Position: Running back

Personal information
- Born: February 14, 1977 (age 49); Palmyra, North Carolina, U.S.
- Listed height: 6 ft 1 in (1.85 m)
- Listed weight: 233 lb (106 kg)

Career information
- High school: Southeast Halifax (NC)
- College: North Carolina A&T
- NFL draft: 2000: undrafted

Career history
- Atlanta Falcons (2000–2002); Green Bay Packers (2002)

Awards and highlights
- First-team All-MEAC (1999)

Career NFL statistics
- Rushing att-yards: 256-829
- Receptions-yards: 20-235
- Touchdowns: 6
- Stats at Pro Football Reference

Maurice E. Smith (born February 14, 1977) is an American former professional football player who played running back for three seasons in the National Football League (NFL) for the Atlanta Falcons and Green Bay Packers. An undrafted free agent in 2000 out of North Carolina A&T State University, he negotiated and signed his own initial NFL contract over a span of five hours, ultimately receiving the highest signing bonus of all undrafted signees.
