= Thom Kaumeyer =

American football player and coach (born 1967)

No. 23
- Position: Defensive back

Personal information
- Born: March 17, 1967 (age 59); San Diego, California, U.S.
- Listed height: 5 ft 11 in (1.80 m)
- Listed weight: 187 lb (85 kg)

Career information
- High school: San Dieguito (Encinitas, California)
- College: Oregon
- NFL draft: 1989: 6th round, 148 (by the Los Angeles Rams)th overall pick

Career history

Playing
- Los Angeles Rams (1989)*; Seattle Seahawks (1989–1990); New York Giants (1991–1992)
- * Offseason or practice squad member only

Coaching
- Palomar (1991–1993) Assistant; Palomar (1994) Head coach; Onward Oaks (1995–1996) Head coach; Palomar (1998–2000) Defensive coordinator & special teams coach; Atlanta Falcons (2000–2001) Defensive quality control coach; San Diego State (2002–2006) Defensive coordinator & defensive backs coach; Tulane (2007) Defensive coordinator; Kentucky (2008) Defensive backs coach; Jacksonville Jaguars (2008–2011) Assistant defensive backs coach; Hawaii (2012–2013) Defensive coordinator; Fujitsu Frontiers (2014) Defensive backs coach; Pasadena City (2015) Head coach; Fujitsu Frontiers (2016–17) Defensive backs coach; IBM Big Blue (2018-20) Defensive coordinator

Awards and highlights
- Second-team All-Pac-10 (1988)
- Stats at Pro Football Reference

Thom Kaumeyer (born March 17, 1967) is an American former professional football defensive back. He played for the Seattle Seahawks from 1989 to 1990. Kaumeyer played college football at the University of Oregon and was selected in the sixth round of the 1989 NFL draft by the Los Angeles Rams.

== Head coaching record ==
=== Junior college ===
Year	Team	Overall	Conference	Standing	Bowl/playoffs
Palomar Comets (Mission Conference) (1994)
1994	Palomar	8–3	4–2	3rd (North)	W San Diego Community College Classic
Palomar:		8–3	4–2		
Pasadena City Lancers (National Northern League) (2015)
2015	Pasadena City	2–8	0–6	7th	
Pasadena City:		2–8	0–6		
Total:		10–11			
