= Jack Burns (American football coach) =

American football player and coach (born 1949)

Biographical details
- Born: January 3, 1949 (age 77); Tampa, Florida, U.S.
- Education: University of Florida

Playing career
- 1967–1970: Florida
- Position: Defensive back

Coaching career (HC unless noted)
- 1978: Vanderbilt (assistant)
- 1979−1980: Auburn (WR)
- 1983: Tampa Bay Bandits (WR)
- 1985–1988: Louisville (OC)
- 1989–1991: Washington Redskins (OA/WR)
- 1992–1993: Minnesota Vikings (OC/QB)
- 1997–1998: Atlanta Falcons (QB)
- 1999: Atlanta Falcons (pass game)
- 2000: Atlanta Falcons (WR)
- 2001–2002: Atlanta Falcons (QB)
- 2004: Washington Redskins (QB)
- 2005–2007: Washington Redskins (OA)

Accomplishments and honors

Championships
- Super Bowl champion (XXVI)

Jack Charles Burns (born January 3, 1949) is an American former football coach whose career spanned 30 years at both the collegiate and professional levels. He served as an assistant coach in the National Football League (NFL) for 15 seasons, including stints with the Washington Redskins, Minnesota Vikings, and Atlanta Falcons. Burns was the offensive coordinator for the Vikings from 1992 to 1993 and part of the Redskins' 1991 Super Bowl championship team. At the college level, he most notably served as offensive coordinator at the University of Louisville under Howard Schnellenberger from 1985 until 1988.

He is the uncle of MLB player Billy Burns.
