= Michael Thompson (American football) =

American football player (born 1977)

No. 66
- Position: Offensive tackle

Personal information
- Born: February 11, 1977 (age 49); Savannah, Georgia, U.S.
- Listed height: 6 ft 8 in (2.03 m)
- Listed weight: 295 lb (134 kg)

Career information
- High school: Windsor Forest (Savannah)
- College: Tennessee State (1995–1999)
- NFL draft: 2000: 4th round, 100th overall pick

Career history
- Atlanta Falcons (2000–2002)

Career NFL statistics
- Games started: 4
- Games played: 12
- Stats at Pro Football Reference

Michael Thompson (born February 11, 1977) is an American former professional football player who was an offensive tackle for the Atlanta Falcons of the National Football League (NFL). He played college football for the Tennessee State Tigers and was selected by the Falcons in the fourth round of the 2000 NFL draft. Thompson played for Atlanta until being released in 2002. In his career with the Falcons, Thompson played in four games, starting two of them.

== Criminal activity ==
On August 31, 2005, the Atlanta Journal-Constitution reported that Thompson had been arrested. He was charged with 3 counts of armed robbery in Suwannee, Georgia. Thompson robbed three guests of the Admiral Benbow Inn at gunpoint.
