= Johndale Carty =

American gridiron football player (born 1977)

No. 35
- Position: Defensive back

Personal information
- Born: August 27, 1977 (age 49); Miami, Florida, U.S.
- Listed height: 6 ft 0 in (1.83 m)
- Listed weight: 196 lb (89 kg)

Career information
- High school: Miami Lakes (Hialeah, Florida)
- College: Utah State (1995–1998)
- NFL draft: 1999: 4th round, 126th overall pick

Career history
- Atlanta Falcons (1999–2002); Jacksonville Jaguars (2003)*
- * Offseason or practice squad member only
- Stats at Pro Football Reference

Johndale Edward Carty (born August 27, 1977) is an American former professional football defensive back who played four seasons with the Atlanta Falcons of the National Football League (NFL). He was selected by the Falcons in the fourth round of the 1999 NFL draft. He played college football at Utah State University.

== Early life and college ==
Johndale Edward Carty was born on August 27, 1977, in Miami, Florida. He attended Hialeah-Miami Lakes High School in Hialeah, Florida.

Carty was a four-year letterman for the Utah State Aggies of Utah State University from 1995 to 1998.

== Professional career ==
Carty was selected by the Atlanta Falcons in the fourth round, with the 126th overall pick, of the 1999 NFL draft. He officially signed with the team on July 8. He played in 14 games for the Falcons during his rookie year in 1999, posting 11 solo tackles and two assisted tackles. Carty appeared in 15 games during the 2000 season and recorded 12 solo tackles. He played in all 16 games, starting two, in 2001, totaling 17 solo tackles, six assisted tackles, one interception, and one pass breakup. He played in all 16 games for the second straight season, starting one, in 2002, recording 25 solo tackles, three assisted tackles, one sack, one interception, and two pass breakups. Carty also appeared in two playoff games during the 2002 season, posting four solo tackles and three tackles. He was released by the Falcons on May 15, 2003.

Carty signed with the Jacksonville Jaguars on May 28, 2003. He was released on August 26, 2003.
