= Mareno Philyaw =

American football player and coach (born 1977)

No. 82
- Position: Wide receiver

Personal information
- Born: December 19, 1977 (age 48); Atlanta, Georgia, U.S.
- Listed height: 6 ft 2 in (1.88 m)
- Listed weight: 208 lb (94 kg)

Career information
- High school: North Clayton (College Park, Georgia)
- College: Troy State (1996–1999)
- NFL draft: 2000: 6th round, 172nd overall pick

Career history
- Atlanta Falcons (2000)*; New Orleans Saints (2000)*; Atlanta Falcons (2000–2001); → Barcelona Dragons (2001); Carolina Panthers (2002)*; Dallas Desperados (2003); Saskatchewan Roughriders (2004)*; Montgomery Maulers (2005); Birmingham Steeldogs (2006–2007)
- * Offseason or practice squad member only
- Stats at Pro Football Reference
- Stats at ArenaFan.com

Mareno Philyaw (born December 19, 1977) is an American former professional football player who was a wide receiver for one season with the Atlanta Falcons of the National Football League (NFL). He was selected by the Falcons in the sixth round of the 2000 NFL draft after playing college football for the Troy Trojans.

== Early life and college ==
Mareno Philyaw was born on December 19, 1977, in Atlanta, Georgia. He attended North Clayton High School in College Park, Georgia.

Philyaw was a four-year letterman for the Troy State Trojans of Troy State University from 1996 to 1999. He graduated from Troy with a business degree.

== Professional career ==
Philyaw was selected by the Atlanta Falcons in the sixth round, with the 172nd overall pick, of the 2000 NFL draft. He officially signed with the team on May 23. He was released on August 27, 2000.

Philyaw was then signed to the practice squad of the New Orleans Saints on August 29, 2000. He was released on October 10, 2000.

Philyaw was signed to the Falcons' practice squad on October 11, 2000. He was promoted to the active roster on December 15 and played in one game for the Falcons. He became a free agent after the 2000 season and re-signed with the team on January 26, 2001. On February 19, 2001, Philyaw was allocated to the Barcelona Dragons of NFL Europe. However, he was placed on injured reserve and never played for the Dragons. On July 27, 2001, the Falcons placed him on the reserve/non-football injury list, where he spent the entire 2001 season. Philyaw was released by the Falcons the next year on July 27, 2002.

Philyaw was claimed off waivers by the Carolina Panthers on July 29, 2002. He was released on August 26, 2002.

On November 22, 2002, Philyaw signed with the Dallas Desperados of the Arena Football League (AFL) for the 2003 AFL season. He was placed on injured reserve on January 28 and waived on February 19, 2003.

Philyaw signed with the Saskatchewan Roughriders of the Canadian Football League (CFL) in 2004. He was released on June 12, 2004, before the start of the 2004 CFL season.

Philyaw was a member of the Montgomery Maulers of the National Indoor Football League in 2005.

Philyaw was a member of the Birmingham Steeldogs of the af2 from 2006 to 2007.

== Coaching career ==
Philyaw served as head coach of the Atlanta Ravens of the Independent Women's Football League. He was later the head coach of the Peach State Cats indoor football team.
