= James Daniel =

American football player and coach (born 1953)

Personal information
- Born: January 17, 1953 (age 73); Wetumpka, Alabama, U.S.

Career information
- College: Alabama State

Career history
- 1974–1980: Enterprise H.S. (OL)
- 1981–1992: Auburn (OL)
- 1993–1996: New York Giants (TE)
- 1997–2003: Atlanta Falcons (TE)
- 2000: Atlanta Falcons (OL)
- 2004–2020: Pittsburgh Steelers (TE)

Awards and highlights
- 2× Super Bowl champion (as coach) — XL (2005), XLIII (2008)

James Daniel (born January 17, 1953) is an American former football coach. He most recently served as the tight ends coach for the National Football League (NFL)'s Pittsburgh Steelers.

== Biography ==
=== College career ===
Daniel was a 4-year letter winner playing offensive guard at Alabama State University.

=== Coaching career ===
Daniel began his coaching career as an offensive line coach at Enterprise High School from 1974 to 1980 after graduating from Alabama State. He enjoyed a high level of success at the high school level, as during this five year time span eleven of his offensive linemen earned college scholarships.

He moved to Auburn in 1981 to serve as the offensive line coach on head coach Pat Dye's staff from 1981 to 1992. During his 12-year tenure, the Tigers appeared in nine consecutive bowl games, four linemen were selected for All-American honours and several selected All-SEC.

Daniel's first professional level coaching experience came as a part of the NFL's Minority Fellowship program, with the New Orleans Saints in 1988 and with the Denver Broncos in 1992 under head coach Dan Reeves. He made his professional-level debut with the New York Giants, serving as tight end coach from 1993 to 1996. He moved to the Atlanta Falcons in 1997, serving in the same capacity from 1997 to 2003. Daniel was instrumental in the development of tight end Alge Crumpler, who led the Falcons in receptions in 2002 and 2003 and has earned four Pro Bowl selections as well as two All-Pro honours. Daniel also served as the offensive line coach in 2000.

Daniel joined the Pittsburgh Steelers in 2004, replacing Ken Whisenhunt as tight ends coach after Whisenhunt was promoted to offensive coordinator. He has been instrumental in the development of tight end Heath Miller, guiding Miller to become an all-around player and a solid postseason contributor. Under Daniel's tutelage, Miller has earned a Pro Bowl selection while also setting team records for single-season receptions, postseason receptions, touchdowns, and yards for the tight end position.

=== Personal life ===
Daniel and his wife, Myrtis, have no children.
