= Rennie Simmons =

American football coach (born 1942)

Personal information
- Born: February 25, 1942 (age 84); Poughkeepsie, New York, U.S.

Career information
- College: San Diego State

Career history
- Cal State Fullerton (1974–1978); Cerritos College (1978–1980); Washington Redskins (1981–1993) TE/OL/WR; Los Angeles Rams (1994) TE; Vanderbilt (1995) OC; Houston Oilers (1996) OL; Atlanta Falcons (1997–1999) OL; Atlanta Falcons (2000) TE; Atlanta Falcons (2001–2003) OL; Washington Redskins (2004–2008) TE

Awards and highlights
- 3× Super Bowl champion (XVII, XXII, XXVI)

Warren "Rennie" Simmons (born February 25, 1942) is an American former football coach. Simmons last coached for the Washington Redskins as tight ends coach. Simmons announced his retirement from the Redskins on January 7, 2009, after 34 years as a coach. 27 of those seasons were in the National Football League (NFL), and 18 of them were with the Redskins.
