= Todd McClure =

American football player (born 1977)

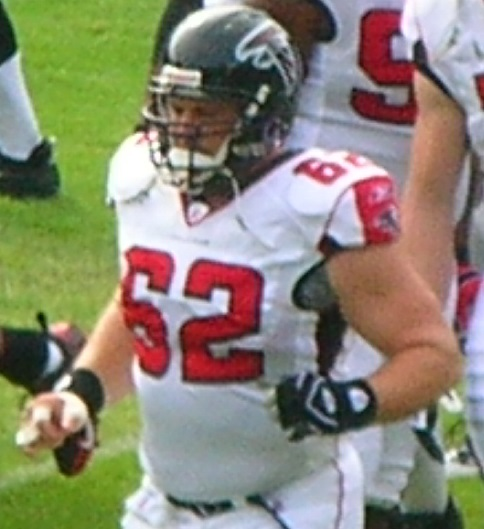
- McClure with the Atlanta Falcons in 2008

No. 62
- Position: Center

Personal information
- Born: February 16, 1977 (age 49); Baton Rouge, Louisiana, U.S.
- Listed height: 6 ft 1 in (1.85 m)
- Listed weight: 296 lb (134 kg)

Career information
- High school: Central (Baton Rouge)
- College: LSU (1995–1998)
- NFL draft: 1999: 7th round, 237th overall pick

Career history
- Atlanta Falcons (1999–2012)

Awards and highlights
- Atlanta Falcons Ring of Honor; All-American (1998); 2× First-team All-SEC (1997, 1998)

Career NFL statistics
- Games played: 198
- Games started: 195
- Fumble recoveries: 10
- Stats at Pro Football Reference

Ryan Todd McClure (born February 16, 1977) is an American former professional football player who spent his entire 13-year career as a center for the Atlanta Falcons of the National Football League (NFL). He played college football for the LSU Tigers. He was selected by the Falcons in the seventh round of the 1999 NFL draft.

== College career ==
He played tight end at Central High School in Central, Louisiana. McClure played his college football for the LSU Tigers. He was initially going to be redshirted before an injury to starter Marcus Carmouche inserted him into the starting lineup. As a senior and junior he was a consensus All-Southeastern Conference first-team choice.

== Professional career ==
Pre-draft measurables
Height	Weight	Arm length	Hand span	40-yard dash	10-yard split	20-yard split	20-yard shuttle	Three-cone drill	Vertical jump	Broad jump	Bench press
6 ft 1 3/8 in (1.86 m)	298 lb (135 kg)	31 1/4 in (0.79 m)	9 3/4 in (0.25 m)	5.26 s	1.86 s	3.05 s	4.51 s	7.81 s	28.0 in (0.71 m)	8 ft 2 in (2.49 m)	29 reps
All values from NFL Combine

McClure was selected by the Atlanta Falcons in the seventh round of the 1999 NFL draft. During training camp of his rookie season he suffered a torn anterior cruciate ligament in his right knee and missed his entire rookie season. During his second season he took over as the Falcons starting center after Calvin Collins was moved to guard. Since then he missed only one game and was the Falcons starting center from 2000 until his retirement after the 2012 season.

McClure made the first start of his career at center against the Carolina Panthers on October 29. During the 2004 postseason, McClure was part of a line that set the fourth-highest NFL postseason record with 327 rushing yards, including a Falcons record 142 yards by Warrick Dunn and an NFL record for quarterbacks with Michael Vick collecting 119 yards on the ground.

McClure retired on March 13, 2013, and during his retirement press conference Falcons owner Arthur Blank stated that McClure would soon join the Atlanta Falcons Ring of Honor.

In July 2022, it was announced that McClure will be inducted into the team's Ring of Honor in October. On October 30, 2022, he was inducted during a home game against the Carolina Panthers.
