= Travis Claridge =

American football player (1978–2006)

- Claridge during his tenure at USC.

No. 71
- Position: Offensive guard

Personal information
- Born: March 23, 1978; Detroit, Michigan, U.S.
- Died: February 28, 2006 (aged 27); Las Vegas, Nevada, U.S.
- Listed height: 6 ft 5 in (1.96 m)
- Listed weight: 300 lb (136 kg)

Career information
- High school: Vancouver (WA) Fort Vancouver
- College: Southern California
- NFL draft: 2000: 2nd round, 37th overall pick

Career history
- Atlanta Falcons (2000–2003); Carolina Panthers (2004); Hamilton Tiger-Cats (2005)

Awards and highlights
- Third-team All-American (1999); Morris Trophy (1999); 2× First-team All-Pac-10 (1998, 1999)

Career NFL statistics
- Games played: 52
- Games started: 49
- Stats at Pro Football Reference

Travis Claridge (March 23, 1978 – February 28, 2006) was an American football guard in the National Football League (NFL). He played for the Atlanta Falcons between 2000 and 2003 and for the Carolina Panthers in 2004.

== Early life ==
Travis Claridge was born in Detroit, Michigan and grew up in Almont, Michigan. His dad coached football at Almont H.S. When he was in the 4th grade he moved with his dad to California. Then as a 7th grader Travis and his dad moved to Vancouver, Washington. Travis went to Fort Vancouver High School. In 1995, he became the number one offensive lineman in the country and the number two high school football player in the nation. He chose the Trojans of the University of Southern California over 60-plus schools.

== College career ==
Claridge started 48 games for USC and the first to do so as a true freshman in college football and was voted the Pac-10 top offensive linesman in 1999. Started in both the Senior Bowl and East-West Shrine Game. He won the Morris Trophy as the Pac-10s top lineman.

== Professional career ==
After being selected 37th overall by the Atlanta Falcons in the second round of the 2000 NFL draft, he started for 62 games in his first four seasons. However, a knee injury limited him to 6 games in the 2003 and the Falcons did not extend his contract.

Although he signed with the Carolina Panthers as a free agent in 2004, he was cut during training camp. In 2005, Claridge played two games at the right tackle position with the Hamilton Tiger-Cats in the Canadian Football League. He played brilliantly in his debut and was voted MVP of the game. It was the first time any player in his first CFL game was voted player of the game. He was injured in his second game and did not play again.

== Death ==
After being found unconscious at his home in Las Vegas, Nevada, he was transported to Saint Rose Dominican Hospital in Henderson where he later died at age 27. The Canadian Broadcasting Corporation reported on 10 May 2006 that the cause of death was acute pneumonia, exacerbated by respiratory depression brought on by intoxication with the painkiller oxycodone .

== See also ==
- List of gridiron football players who died during their careers
