= Chuck Wiley =

American football player (born 1975)

No. 55, 99, 94, 93
- Position: Defensive end

Personal information
- Born: March 6, 1975 (age 51); Baton Rouge, Louisiana, U.S.
- Listed height: 6 ft 5 in (1.96 m)
- Listed weight: 275 lb (125 kg)

Career information
- High school: Southern University Lab (LA)
- College: LSU
- NFL draft: 1998: 3rd round, 62nd overall pick

Career history
- Carolina Panthers (1998–1999); Atlanta Falcons (2000–2001); Minnesota Vikings (2002–2004); New York Giants (2004)

Awards and highlights
- 2× First-team All-SEC (1996, 1997); Second-team All-SEC (1995)

Career NFL statistics
- Tackles: 128
- Sacks: 6.5
- Interceptions: 1
- Stats at Pro Football Reference

Samuel Charles Wiley Jr. (born March 6, 1975) is an American former professional football player who played defensive end in the National Football League (NFL). He was selected by the Carolina Panthers in the third round of the 1998 NFL draft. He played for four teams: The Panthers, Atlanta Falcons, Minnesota Vikings, and New York Giants. He played college football at Louisiana State University.
