= Dallas Neil =

American football player (born 1976)

No. 49
- Positions: Tight end, punter

Personal information
- Born: September 30, 1976 (age 50); Great Falls, Montana, U.S.
- Listed height: 6 ft 5 in (1.96 m)
- Listed weight: 255 lb (116 kg)

Career information
- College: Montana

Career history
- Atlanta Falcons (2000–2002); New York Jets (2003–2004)
- Stats at Pro Football Reference

Dallas Neil (born September 30, 1976) is an American former professional football player who was a punter and tight end for the Atlanta Falcons and the New York Jets. Neil was the starting quarterback for his high school football team, Great Falls High School; cross town rivals to CMR High School, and CMR's starting quarterback at the time, Ryan Leaf. Neal played college football for the Montana Grizzlies as both a tight end and punter. He completed his master's degree in May 2000, and founded a business, Kinetic Sports Interactive.

After going undrafted in the 2000 NFL draft, Neil was signed by the Atlanta Falcons. He played 6 games behind Dan Stryzinski at punter, and dealt with injury problems for some of the season. In 2001, he was released and then signed to the Falcons practice squad. He was then re-signed to the regular roster on January 10, 2002. However, in a pre-season game Neil injured his ankle and was placed on injured reserve on August 27, 2002. In 2003 Neil became a free agent before signing with the New York Jets. He was waived in early 2004, ending his NFL career.
