= Derek Rackley =

American football player (born 1977)

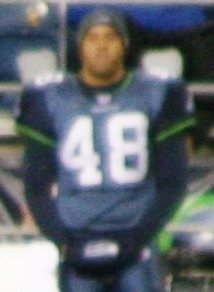
- Rackley with the Seattle Seahawks in 2006

No. 48
- Positions: Long snapper, tight end

Personal information
- Born: July 18, 1977 (age 49); Apple Valley, Minnesota, U.S.
- Listed height: 6 ft 4 in (1.93 m)
- Listed weight: 250 lb (113 kg)

Career information
- High school: Apple Valley
- College: Minnesota (1996–1999)
- NFL draft: 2000: undrafted

Career history
- Atlanta Falcons (2000–2005); Seattle Seahawks (2006–2007)

Career NFL statistics
- Games played: 116
- Receptions: 1
- Receiving yards: 1
- Total touchdowns: 1
- Total tackles: 8
- Stats at Pro Football Reference

Derek Lance Rackley (born July 18, 1977) is an American former professional football player who was a long snapper and tight end for eight seasons in the National Football League (NFL). He played college football for the Minnesota Golden Gophers.

Rackley is currently a football analyst and broadcaster for the Comcast/Charter Sports Southeast nightly television show, SportsNite, as well as a game and studio analyst for the Big Ten Network (BTN) and Westwood One. Rackley also regularly appears on The Big Ten Pulse also on BTN. Derek Rackley worked as an Analyst for select Sunday night Football games on Westwood One in 2021 and select NFL games for Westwood One since 2022.

== Early life ==
Rackley was born in Apple Valley, Minnesota and attended Apple Valley High School in Apple Valley. As a senior, he was an All-State Honorable Mention honoree and an Academic All-State honoree. He graduated in 1995 from Apple Valley High School with honors.

== College career ==
Rackley attended the University of Minnesota and was a four-year letterman in football. He saw action as tight end, in addition to handling long snapper duties for four years. He worked for General Mills in Minnesota before he began his professional career.

== Professional career ==
Rackley was signed by the Atlanta Falcons as an undrafted free agent in 2000. He caught the only touchdown of his career, a 1-yard pass from Michael Vick, on December 30, 2001, when the Falcons were playing the Miami Dolphins. Rackley then signed with the Seattle Seahawks in 2006.
