= Harold Richardson (American football) =

Personal information
- Born: September 27, 1944 (age 82); Houston, Texas, U.S.

Career information
- College: SMU

Career history

Coaching
- SMU (1971–1972) Assistant; Oklahoma State (1973–1976) Assistant; TCU (1977–1978) Defensive ends; North Texas State (1979–1980) Assistant; New Orleans Saints (1981–1984) Special teams; New Orleans Saints (1985) Wide receivers; Colorado State (1987–1988) Defensive coordinator; Denver Broncos (1989–1990) Special teams; Denver Broncos (1991–1992) Special teams/tight ends

Operations
- Denver Broncos (1993–1994) Special assistant to head coach; Denver Broncos (1995–1996) Administrative assistant/player personnel; Atlanta Falcons (1997) Assistant head coach/football operations; Atlanta Falcons (1998–2002) General manager; East–West Shrine Bowl (2010–2019) Executive director

Harold Richardson (born September 27, 1944) is an American football coach and executive who served as general manager of the Atlanta Falcons from 1998 to 2002.

== Playing ==
Richardson played tight end at Southern Methodist University from 1965 to 1967. In his three seasons with the Mustangs, Richardson caught 34 passes for 394 yards and two touchdowns.

== Coaching ==
Richardson began his college coaching career at his alma mater – SMU. From 1973 to 1976 he was an assistant at Oklahoma State University, where he was part of a coaching staff that included Bum Phillips, Wade Phillips and Frank Gansz. He then served as defensive ends coach at Texas Christian University. After a two-year stint at North Texas State, Richardson moved to the NFL. From 1981 to 1985 he was an assistant with the New Orleans Saints. From 1987 to 1988 he was the defensive coordinator of the Colorado State Rams.

== Front office ==
In 1989, Richardson joined the Denver Broncos as special teams coach. He moved to the front office in 1993, assisting in contract negotiations and salary-cap management. He left the Broncos in 1997 to join former Broncos head coach Dan Reeves in Atlanta. After one season as the Falcons' assistant head coach/football operations, Richardson was promoted to general manager. As GM, Richardson oversaw contract signings and salary cap management, marketing, and public and community relations. When Reeves missed two games at the end of the 1998 season due to bypass surgery, Richardson assisted interim head coach Rich Brooks, serving as his on-field connection with game officials and team captains while Brooks coached from the coaches' box. In that first season as GM, the Falcons went 14-2 and managed to make their first ever Super Bowl appearance. However, the Falcons sputtered in the next three seasons, winning just 16 combined games. After Arthur Blank purchased the team in February 2002 he began looking to replace Richardson. He resigned on May 9, 2002.

From 2010 to 2019, Richardson was the executive director of the East–West Shrine Bowl.
