= 2005 Atlanta Falcons season =

40th season in franchise history, collapse after 6-2 start

- Owner: Arthur Blank
- General manager: Rich McKay
- Head coach: Jim Mora
- Home stadium: Georgia Dome

Results
- Record: 8–8
- Division place: 3rd NFC South
- Playoffs: Did not qualify
- Pro Bowlers: TE Alge Crumpler; QB Michael Vick; RB Warrick Dunn; DT Rodgers Coleman; LB Keith Brooking; CB DeAngelo Hall

The 2005 Atlanta Falcons season was the franchise's 40th in the National Football League (NFL). It began with the team trying to defend their NFC South division title and 11–5 record in 2004. The Falcons started 6–2, but injuries on defense caused them to finish the second half 2–6 to finish the season with a .500 record.

Bright spots included the Falcons ending their Monday Night Football jinx by going 3–0, and on Thursday, November 24, the Falcons played on Thanksgiving Day for the first time in franchise history with a 27–7 victory over the Detroit Lions. On the penultimate game of the regular season, the Falcons were eliminated from postseason contention with a 27–24 overtime loss against the Tampa Bay Buccaneers. The Falcons failed to improve over their 11–5 season, once again failing to attain back-to-back winning seasons.

== Offseason ==
=== NFL draft ===
2005 Atlanta Falcons draft
Round	Pick	Player	Position	College	Notes
1	27	Roddy White *	Wide receiver	UAB	
2	59	Jonathan Babineaux	Defensive tackle	Iowa	
3	90	Jordan Beck	Linebacker	Cal Poly	
4	128	Chauncey Davis	Defensive end	Florida State	
5	160	Michael Boley	Linebacker	Southern Miss	
5	163	Frank Omiyale	Offensive tackle	Tennessee Tech	
6	201	DeAndra Cobb	Running back	Michigan State	
7	241	Darrell Shropshire	Defensive tackle	South Carolina	
Made roster * Made at least one Pro Bowl during career

== Personnel ==
=== Staff ===
2005 Atlanta Falcons staff
Front office: Owner/chief executive officer – Arthur Blank; President/general manager – Rich McKay; Director of pro personnel – Les Snead; Director of college scouting – Phil Emery; Head coaches: Executive vice president/head coach – Jim L. Mora; Offensive coaches: Offensive coordinator – Greg Knapp; Quarterbacks – Mike Johnson; Running backs – Ollie Wilson; Wide receivers – George Stewart; Tight ends – Clancy Barone; Offensive line – Jeff Jagodzinski; Offensive assistant – Chris Dalman; Offensive assistant – Robert Prince; Consultant – Alex Gibbs	Defensive coaches: Defensive coordinator – Ed Donatell; Defensive line – Bill Johnson; Linebackers – Chris Beake; Senior defensive assistant/secondary – Emmitt Thomas; Defensive backs – Brett Maxie; Defensive assistant – Dennis Allen; Special teams coaches: Special teams coordinator – Joe DeCamillis; Strength and conditioning: Strength and conditioning – Al Miller; Assistant strength and conditioning – Rocky Colburn

=== Roster ===
2005 Atlanta Falcons roster
Quarterbacks (QB): 14 Ty Detmer; 8 Matt Schaub; 7 Michael Vick; Running backs (RB): 34 DeAndra' Cobb; 45 T. J. Duckett; 28 Warrick Dunn; 33 Justin Griffith FB; 44 Fred McCrary FB; Wide receivers (WR): 87 Cedric Bonner; 86 Brian Finneran; 12 Michael Jenkins; 82 Jerome Pathon; 84 Roddy White; Tight ends (TE): 80 Eric Beverly; 85 Dwayne Blakley; 83 Alge Crumpler	Offensive linemen (OL): 69 Ben Claxton G; 65 Kynan Forney G; 66 Austin King C/G; 61 Matt Lehr G; 62 Todd McClure C; 70 Frank Omiyale; 76 Kevin Shaffer RT; 79 Barry Stokes; 74 Todd Weiner LT; Defensive linemen (DL): 95 Jonathan Babineaux DE; 75 Rod Coleman DT; 92 Chauncey Davis DE; 97 Patrick Kerney DE; 94 Chad Lavalais DT; 93 Constantin Ritzmann DE; 73 Josh Savage DE; 71 Darrell Shropshire DT	Linebackers (LB): 59 Michael Boley OLB; 56 Keith Brooking MLB; 98 Ike Reese OLB; 54 Artie Ulmer OLB; 51 Demorrio Williams OLB; Defensive backs (DB): 29 Keion Carpenter SS; 42 Antuan Edwards SS; 21 DeAngelo Hall CB; 38 Ronnie Heard FS; 26 Omare Lowe CB; 25 Kevin McCadam FS; 39 Cam Newton SS; 24 Bryan Scott FS; 22 Leigh Torrence CB; 37 Ahmad Treaudo CB; 36 Jason Webster CB; 30 Brandon Williams CB; Special teams (ST): 9 Michael Koenen P; 2 Todd Peterson K; 48 Derek Rackley LS	Practice squad: 90 Klaus Alinen DE; 53 Derrick Ballard OLB; 77 Tyson Clabo G; 41 Kevin Dudley FB; 43 Diamond Ferri RB; 99 Jonathan Jackson DE; 55 Martin Patterson OLB; 72 Joe Tate G; 17 Kevin Youngblood WR; Reserve: 52 Jordan Beck LB (IR); 27 Chris Cash CB (IR); -- Erik Flowers DE (IR); 50 Edgerton Hartwell MLB (IR); 11 Kerry Johnson WR (IR); 96 Antwan Lake DT (IR); 23 Kevin Mathis CB (IR); 20 Allen Rossum CB (IR); 91 Brady Smith DE (IR); 89 Dez White WR (IR); Rookies in italics 53 active, 10 reserve, 9 practice squad

== Schedule ==
=== Preseason ===
Week	Date	Opponent	Result	Record	Game site	NFL.com recap
1	August 6	Indianapolis Colts	W 27–21	1–0	(Japan) Tokyo Dome (Tokyo)	Recap
2	August 13	Baltimore Ravens	W 16–3	2–0	Georgia Dome	Recap
3	August 19	Tennessee Titans	L 21–24	2–1	Georgia Dome	Recap
4	August 25	at Jacksonville Jaguars	W 23–7	3–1	ALLTEL Stadium	Recap
4	September 1	at Miami Dolphins	W 20–17	4–1	Dolphins Stadium	Recap

=== Regular season ===
Week	Date	Opponent	Result	Record	Game site	NFL.com recap
1	September 12	Philadelphia Eagles	W 14–10	1–0	Georgia Dome	Recap
2	September 18	at Seattle Seahawks	L 18–21	1–1	Qwest Field	Recap
3	September 25	at Buffalo Bills	W 24–16	2–1	Ralph Wilson Stadium	Recap
4	October 2	Minnesota Vikings	W 30–10	3–1	Georgia Dome	Recap
5	October 9	New England Patriots	L 28–31	3–2	Georgia Dome	Recap
6	October 16	at New Orleans Saints	W 34–31	4–2	Alamodome (Note: Due to damages from Hurricane Katrina, the Saints' were forced to host their home games elsewhere.)	Recap
7	October 24	New York Jets	W 27–14	5–2	Georgia Dome	Recap
8	Bye					
9	November 6	at Miami Dolphins	W 17–10	6–2	Dolphins Stadium	Recap
10	November 13	Green Bay Packers	L 25–33	6–3	Georgia Dome	Recap
11	November 20	Tampa Bay Buccaneers	L 27–30	6–4	Georgia Dome	Recap
12	November 24	at Detroit Lions	W 27–7	7–4	Ford Field	Recap
13	December 4	at Carolina Panthers	L 6–24	7–5	Bank of America Stadium	Recap
14	December 12	New Orleans Saints	W 36–17	8–5	Georgia Dome	Recap
15	December 18	at Chicago Bears	L 3–16	8–6	Soldier Field	Recap
16	December 24	at Tampa Bay Buccaneers	L 24–27 (OT)	8–7	Raymond James Stadium	Recap
17	January 1	Carolina Panthers	L 11–44	8–8	Georgia Dome	Recap

=== Game summaries ===
==== Week 1 vs Eagles ====
Week One: Philadelphia Eagles (0–0) at Atlanta Falcons (0–0)

Quarter	1	2	3	4	Total
Eagles	0	7	0	3	10
Falcons	14	0	0	0	14

at Georgia Dome • Atlanta, Georgia

- Date: September 12
- Game time: 9:00 p.m. EDT
- Game weather: Indoors (dome)
- Game attendance: 70,806
- Referee: Walt Coleman
- TV announcers (ABC): Al Michaels, John Madden, and Michele Tafoya
- Gamebook

Game information

Eagles

- Donovan McNabb
  24/54, 257 Yds, TD, INT
- Brian Westbrook
  12 Rush, 47 Yds
- Terrell Owens
  7 Rec, 112 Yds

Falcons

- Michael Vick
  12/23, 156 Yds, INT
- Warrick Dunn
  21 Rush, 117 Yds
- Michael Jenkins
  3 Rec, 80 Yds

Scoring summary

Quarter	Time	Drive			Team	Scoring information	Score	
Quarter	Time	Plays	Yards	TOP	Team	Scoring information	PHI	ATL
1	3:06	6	58	2:45	Falcons	Michael Vick 7-yard touchdown run, Todd Peterson kick good	0	7
1	0:09	3	64	1:29	Falcons	T.J. Duckett 1-yard touchdown run, Todd Peterson kick good	0	14
2	11:21	9	78	3:48	Eagles	Brian Westbrook 9-yard touchdown reception from Donovan McNabb, David Akers kick good	7	14
4	9:20	10	54	3:54	Eagles	44-yard field goal by David Akers	10	14
"TOP" = time of possession. For other American football terms, see Glossary of American football.							10	14

== Standings ==
NFC South
	W	L	T	PCT	DIV	CONF	PF	PA	STK
^{(3)} Tampa Bay Buccaneers	11	5	0	.688	5–1	9–3	300	274	W2
^{(5)} Carolina Panthers	11	5	0	.688	4–2	8–4	391	259	W1
Atlanta Falcons	8	8	0	.500	2–4	5–7	351	341	L3
New Orleans Saints	3	13	0	.188	1–5	1–11	235	398	L5

== Images ==
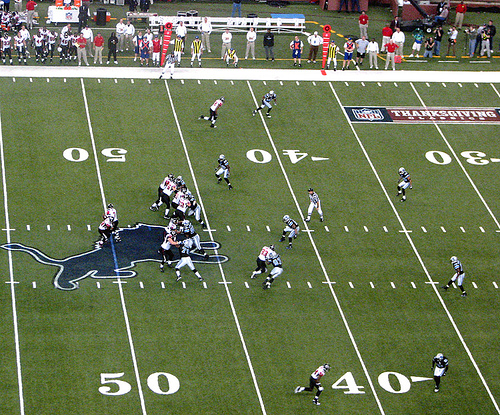
The Thanksgiving Day game between the Falcons and the Detroit Lions

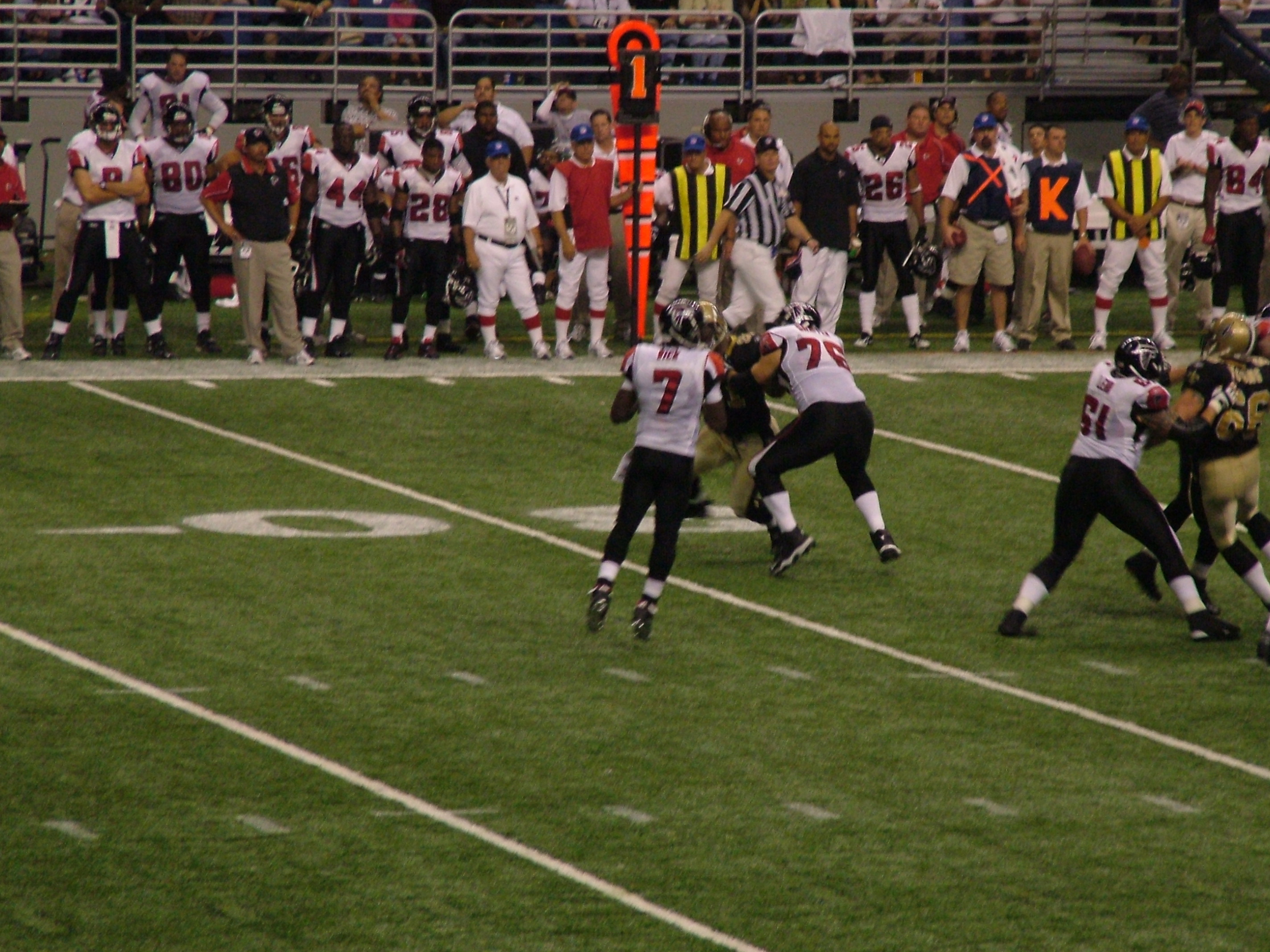
Vick scanning the field against the New Orleans Saints
