= 2004 Tampa Bay Buccaneers season =

NFL team season

- Owner: Malcolm Glazer
- Head coach: Jon Gruden
- Home stadium: Raymond James Stadium

Results
- Record: 5–11
- Division place: 4th NFC South
- Playoffs: Did not qualify
- All-Pros: CB Ronde Barber; LB Derrick Brooks
- Pro Bowlers: CB Ronde Barber; LB Derrick Brooks
- Team MVP: WR Michael Clayton

The 2004 Tampa Bay Buccaneers season was the franchise's 29th season in the National Football League (NFL), the 7th playing their home games at Raymond James Stadium, and the 3rd under head coach Jon Gruden.

John Lynch, for the first time since 1992, and Warren Sapp, for the first time since 1994. were not on the opening day roster.

This season began with the team trying to improve on their 7–9 record in 2003, but they fell even further to a 5–11 record and missed the playoffs for the second straight season and also finished the season with double-digit losses for the first time since 1994. Brian Griese set a number of franchise records for passing. Michael Clayton set a rookie record for receiving.

This was the first time the Buccaneers suffered from consecutive losing seasons since 1995 and 1996.

The Bucs acquired Hall of Fame wide receiver Tim Brown, who was well known for his tenure with the Raiders. After his only season in Tampa Bay, Brown decided to hang it up after 17 seasons. They also acquired former Seattle Seahawks and Dallas Cowboys wide receiver Joey Galloway in a trade for Keyshawn Johnson.

== Summary ==
=== Offseason ===
Before the 2004 training camp, personnel issues and the salary cap became primary concerns. Gruden successfully lobbied the Glazers to hire his former general manager from Oakland, Bruce Allen. After Allen's arrival in the Buccaneers' front office, the team announced that it would not re-sign two of their notable defensive players (John Lynch and Warren Sapp). Both of their contracts were expiring, and younger players would fill their positions. Lynch was released after medical exams indicated ongoing injury problems. Many Buccaneers fans were stunned by the move, as Lynch was a very popular player whose aggressive, intelligent play earned him several Pro Bowl appearances. He was also well regarded for his philanthropic work in the Tampa-area. Lynch was quickly signed by the Denver Broncos, where he had consecutive injury-free Pro Bowl seasons. Sapp signed with the Oakland Raiders, where he played in a limited role in 2004, and sat out much of the 2005 season with injuries but returned to form in 2006. Since wide receiver Keenan McCardell refused to play until he was given a better contract or traded, he was sent to the San Diego Chargers for draft compensation.

Tampa Bay's free agent signings in 2004 included a number of expensive and aging players meant to jumpstart Gruden's offense. These players included tackle Todd Steussie, running back Charlie Garner and tackle Derrick Deese. The 32-year-old Garner signed a reported $20-million contract with a $4-million signing bonus but only played 3 games before going on IR, never playing again after. Steussie was often injured while Deese only played for the team for one year before retiring.

=== Preseason ===
In August, Hurricane Charley brought training camp to a screeching halt. The Buccaneers' first preseason game was also postponed (from Saturday to Monday) due to the storm. After returning to Disney's Wide World of Sports Complex, it was determined that the soaked fields and disrupted schedule was too much to overcome. The team broke camp over a week early, and returned to Tampa. A "rump" week of camp took place at the team facilities, and at the same time, some players and team officials tended to damaged homes in the wake of the storm.

=== Regular season ===
The distracted Buccaneers began the 2004 season with a 1–5 record, their worst start since 1996. The fading accuracy of kicker Martin Gramatica did not help matters and he was cut after week 12, as the team lost many close games en route to a 5–11 record. The Buccaneers became the first NFL team to follow up a Super Bowl championship with back-to-back losing seasons. The lone highlights of 2004 were the high-quality play of rookie wide receiver Michael Clayton and the return of Doug Williams, who joined the Bucs front office as a personnel executive.

The Buccaneers finished their year under Jon Gruden with the 22nd ranked offense and the 5th ranked defense.

== Staff ==
2004 Tampa Bay Buccaneers staff
Front office: Owner/President – Malcolm Glazer; General manager – Bruce Allen; Head coaches: Head coach – Jon Gruden; Assistant head coach/defensive line – Rod Marinelli; Assistant to the head coach/football operations – Paul Kelly; Offensive coaches: Offensive coordinator/offensive line – Bill Muir; Quarterbacks – John Shoop; Assistant quarterbacks – Jeremy Bates; Running backs – Art Valero; Wide receivers – Richard Mann; Tight ends/assistant special teams – Ron Middleton; Offensive assistant – Jay Gruden; Offensive quality control – Jim Pyne; Offensive quality control – Kyle Shanahan	Defensive coaches: Defensive coordinator – Monte Kiffin; Linebackers – Joe Barry; Defensive backs – Mike Tomlin; Assistant defensive backs – Raheem Morris; Defensive quality control – Joe Woods; Special teams coaches: Special teams coordinator – Richard Bisaccia; Strength and conditioning: Director of player development – Cedric Saunders; Strength and conditioning coordinator – Garrett Giemont; Assistant strength and conditioning – Mike Morris

== Roster ==
2004 Tampa Bay Buccaneers roster
Quarterbacks (QB): 8 Brian Griese; 14 Brad Johnson; 2 Chris Simms; Running backs (RB): 40 Mike Alstott FB; 34 Greg Comella; 43 Jameel Cook FB; 33 Earnest Graham; 32 Michael Pittman; 36 Ian Smart; Wide receivers (WR): 81 Tim Brown; 80 Michael Clayton; 84 Joey Galloway; 83 Joe Jurevicius; 82 Charles Lee; Tight ends (TE): 44 Billy Baber; 85 Ken Dilger; 46 Nate Lawrie	Offensive linemen (OL): 60 Cosey Coleman G; 69 Anthony Davis OT; 70 Derrick Deese OT; 79 Sean Mahan C; 72 Matt O'Dwyer G; 78 Matt Stinchcomb G; 75 Todd Steussie OT; 77 Jeb Terry G; 67 Kenyatta Walker OT; Defensive linemen (DL): 95 Chidi Ahanotu DT; 91 Chuck Darby DT; 98 Bryant McNeal DE; 97 Simeon Rice DE; 93 Josh Savage DE; 94 Greg Spires DE; 90 Dewayne White DE; 68 Keith Wright DT	Linebackers (LB): 55 Derrick Brooks 0LB; 51 Keith Burns MLB; 58 Marquis Cooper OLB; 52 Ian Gold OLB; 50 Jeff Gooch MLB; 56 Ryan Nece OLB; 53 Shelton Quarles MLB; Defensive backs (DB): 37 Will Allen SS; 20 Ronde Barber CB; 24 Torrie Cox CB; 27 Mario Edwards CB; 38 John Howell FS; 35 Corey Ivy CB; 28 Dexter Jackson FS; 25 Brian Kelly CB; 26 Dwight Smith SS; Special teams (ST): 9 Josh Bidwell P; 86 Dave Moore LS; 6 Jay Taylor K	Practice squad: 73 Jon Bradley DT; 62 Joe Iorio C; 74 Scott Jackson T; 87 Robert Johnson TE; 16 Derek McCoy WR; 18 DeAndrew Rubin WR; 29 Ronyell Whitaker CB; 17 Kevin Youngblood WR; Reserve: 88 Rickey Dudley TE (IR); 30 Charlie Garner RB (IR); 66 Damian Gregory DT (IR); 89 Will Heller TE (IR); 92 Anthony McFarland DT (IR); 15 Frank Murphy WR (IR); 23 Jermaine Phillips S (IR); 3 Edell Shepherd WR (IR); 76 John Wade C (IR); 96 Ellis Wyms DE (IR); Rookies in italics 53 active, 10 reserve, 8 practice squad

== Preseason ==
Week	Date	Opponent	Result	Record	Game site	NFL.com recap
1	August 16	Cincinnati Bengals (Note: The Buccaneers were originally scheduled to play the Cincinnati Bengals on August 14 at Raymond James Stadium in Tampa, Florida. However, due to the impact from Hurricane Charley, the game was rescheduled to August 16.)	W 20–6	1–0	Raymond James Stadium	Recap
2	August 20	at Jacksonville Jaguars	L 6–14	1–1	Alltel Stadium	Recap
3	August 28	Miami Dolphins	W 17–10	2–1	Raymond James Stadium	Recap
4	September 2	at Houston Texans	W 19–9	3–1	Reliant Stadium	Recap

== Schedule ==
Week	Date	Opponent	Result	Record	Game site	NFL.com recap
1	September 12	at Washington Redskins	**L** 10–16	0–1	FedExField	Recap
2	September 19	Seattle Seahawks	**L** 6–10	0–2	Raymond James Stadium	Recap
3	September 26	at Oakland Raiders	**L** 20–30	0–3	Oakland–Alameda County Coliseum	Recap
4	October 3	Denver Broncos	**L** 13–16	0–4	Raymond James Stadium	Recap
5	October 10	at **New Orleans Saints**	**W** 20–17	1–4	Louisiana Superdome	Recap
6	October 18	at St. Louis Rams	**L** 21–28	1–5	Edward Jones Dome	Recap
7	October 24	Chicago Bears	**W** 19–7	2–5	Raymond James Stadium	Recap
8	Bye					
9	November 7	Kansas City Chiefs	**W** 34–31	3–5	Raymond James Stadium	Recap
10	November 14	at **Atlanta Falcons**	**L** 14–24	3–6	Georgia Dome	Recap
11	November 21	San Francisco 49ers	**W** 35–3	4–6	Raymond James Stadium	Recap
12	November 28	at **Carolina Panthers**	**L** 14–21	4–7	Bank of America Stadium	Recap
13	December 5	**Atlanta Falcons**	**W** 27–0	5–7	Raymond James Stadium	Recap
14	December 12	at San Diego Chargers	**L** 24–31	5–8	Qualcomm Stadium	Recap
15	December 19	**New Orleans Saints**	**L** 17–21	5–9	Raymond James Stadium	Recap
16	December 26	**Carolina Panthers**	**L** 20–37	5–10	Raymond James Stadium	Recap
17	January 2	at Arizona Cardinals	**L** 7–12	5–11	Sun Devil Stadium	Recap
Note: Intra-divisional opponents are in **bold** text.

== Standings ==
NFC South
	W	L	T	PCT	DIV	CONF	PF	PA	STK
^{(2)} Atlanta Falcons	11	5	0	.688	4–2	8–4	340	337	L2
New Orleans Saints	8	8	0	.500	3–3	6–6	348	405	W4
Carolina Panthers	7	9	0	.438	3–3	6–6	355	339	L1
Tampa Bay Buccaneers	5	11	0	.313	2–4	4–8	301	304	L4

NFC
#	Team	Division	W	L	T	PCT	DIV	CONF	SOS	SOV	STK
Division leaders
1	Philadelphia Eagles	East	13	3	0	.813	6–0	11–1	.453	.409	L2
2	Atlanta Falcons	South	11	5	0	.688	4–2	8–4	.420	.432	L2
3	Green Bay Packers	North	10	6	0	.625	5–1	9–3	.457	.419	W2
4	Seattle Seahawks	West	9	7	0	.563	3–3	8–4	.445	.368	W2
Wild cards
5 (Note: St. Louis clinched the NFC #5 seed instead of Minnesota or New Orleans based on better conference record (7–5 to Minnesota’s 5–7 to New Orleans’ 6–6).)	St. Louis Rams	West	8	8	0	.500	5–1	7–5	.488	.438	W2
6 (Note: Minnesota clinched the NFC #6 seed instead of New Orleans based on head-to-head victory.)	Minnesota Vikings	North	8	8	0	.500	3–3	5–7	.480	.406	L2
Did not qualify for the postseason
7	New Orleans Saints	South	8	8	0	.500	3–3	6–6	.465	.427	W4
8	Carolina Panthers	South	7	9	0	.438	3–3	6–6	.496	.366	L1
9 (Note: Detroit finished ahead of Arizona and New York Giants based upon head-to-head record (2–0 versus Arizona’s 1–1 and New York Giants’ 0–2). Division tiebreak was initially used to eliminate Dallas and Washington.)	Detroit Lions	North	6	10	0	.375	2–4	5–7	.496	.417	L2
10	Arizona Cardinals	West	6	10	0	.375	2–4	5–7	.461	.417	W1
11 (Note: New York Giants finished ahead of Dallas and Washington in the NFC East based on better head-to-head record (3–1 to Dallas‘ 2–2 to Washington’s 1–3).)	New York Giants	East	6	10	0	.375	3–3	5–7	.516	.417	W1
12 (Note: Dallas finished ahead of Washington in the NFC East based on head-to-head sweep.)	Dallas Cowboys	East	6	10	0	.375	2–4	5–7	.516	.375	L1
13	Washington Redskins	East	6	10	0	.375	1–5	6–6	.477	.333	W1
14 (Note: Tampa Bay finished ahead of Chicago based upon head-to-head victory.)	Tampa Bay Buccaneers	South	5	11	0	.313	2–4	4–8	.477	.413	L4
15	Chicago Bears	North	5	11	0	.313	2–4	4–8	.465	.388	L4
16	San Francisco 49ers	West	2	14	0	.125	2–4	2–10	.488	.375	L3
Tiebreakers (Note: When breaking ties for three or more teams under the NFL's rules, they are first broken within divisions, then comparing only the highest-ranked remaining team from each division.)

== Game summaries ==
=== Week 1: at Washington Redskins ===
	1	2	3	4	Total
Buccaneers	0	3	7	0	10
Redskins	7	3	0	6	16

Opening day saw Tampa Bay visit Washington. In the second quarter, Brad Johnson threw deep for an apparent 29-yard touchdown pass to newly acquired wide receiver Joey Galloway. Galloway, was unable to secure the ball, and suffered a groin injury on the play. After a Martin Gramatica field goal, the Buccaneers entered halftime trailing 10–3.

Ronde Barber tied the score at 10–10 after he recovered a Mark Brunell fumble 9 yards for a touchdown. After an interception, Washington, managed two field goals in the fourth period, and held on to win 16–10.

=== Week 2: Seattle Seahawks ===
	1	2	3	4	Total
Seahawks	3	7	0	0	10
Buccaneers	0	3	0	3	6

Brad Johnson struggled mightily, completing only 4-of-7 for 34 yards and one interception. Jon Gruden pulled Johnson after the first quarter and replaced him with second year player Chris Simms, to the delight of fans.

Simms drove the Buccaneers to the Seattle 1 yard line. Attempting a quarterback sneak on third-and-goal, Simms fumbled the snap. Tampa Bay settled for a field goal and a 10–3 halftime deficit. In the fourth quarter, another field goal narrowed the game to 10–6. With just over two minutes left, Simms drove the Buccaneers to the Seattle 26. The game ended, however, after he was intercepted with 1:11 to go.

Simms debut yielded mixed results; 175 yard passing, but no touchdowns, and two costly turnovers. The Buccaneers started the season 0–2.

=== Week 3: at Oakland Raiders ===
	1	2	3	4	Total
Buccaneers	3	3	0	14	20
Raiders	3	10	17	0	30

Tampa Bay traveled to Oakland, for a rematch of Super Bowl XXXVII on Sunday Night Football. The game saw the Buccaneers face former player Warren Sapp (who signed with Oakland in the offseason) for the first time. This game was being played while central Florida, including Tampa, was being impacted by Hurricane Jeanne.

Brad Johnson was back in place at starting quarterback, but his numbers were again mediocre. He threw two interceptions (one was returned for a touchdown). Trailing 30–6, Johnson managed two fourth quarter touchdown passes (Tampa Bay's first offensive touchdowns of the season), but the comeback stalled, and the Buccaneers started the season 0–3.

Also, Tim Brown, playing his swan song season in Tampa Bay, scored his 100th and final career touchdown against his old team, the Raiders.

=== Week 4: Denver Broncos ===
	1	2	3	4	Total
Broncos	7	6	0	3	16
Buccaneers	0	10	3	0	13

Tampa Bay's dismal start continued, as they dropped to 0–4 on the season. Brad Johnson connected with Michael Clayton for a 51-yard touchdown in the first half, but three Jason Elam field goals proved to be the winning edge for Denver.

=== Week 5: at New Orleans Saints ===
	1	2	3	4	Total
Buccaneers	3	10	7	0	20
Saints	0	7	7	3	17

Tampa Bay broke a six-game losing streak (dating back to 2003), defeating the Saints 20–17. Slumping Brad Johnson was benched for the season, and Chris Simms started at quarterback. Simms' first NFL start was short-lived, however, as he left the game in the first quarter with a sprained shoulder. Brian Griese took over at quarterback, later connecting on a 45-yard touchdown to Ken Dilger, which proved to be the winning margin.

=== Week 6: at St. Louis Rams ===
	1	2	3	4	Total
Buccaneers	7	7	7	0	21
Rams	7	7	7	7	28

Tampa Bay faced St. Louis on Monday Night Football for the fourth time in five seasons. A Michael Pittman fumble was returned 93 yards for a touchdown by Adam Archuleta, and Martin Gramatica missed two field goal attempts, sinking the Buccaneers' chances at victory.

With a final rating of 7.7, this was the lowest-ever rated MNF game on ABC.

=== Week 7: Chicago Bears ===
	1	2	3	4	Total
Bears	0	0	7	0	7
Buccaneers	0	10	3	6	19

Michael Pittman rushed for 109 yards, and Brian Griese threw a touchdown pass as Tampa Bay prevailed over the visiting Chicago Bears.

=== Week 9: Kansas City Chiefs ===
	1	2	3	4	Total
Chiefs	7	17	7	0	31
Buccaneers	7	14	7	6	34

The lone highlight game of Tampa Bay's forgetful 2004 season came against Kansas City in week 9. Brian Griese threw for 296 yards and two touchdowns, while Michael Pittman rushed for 128 yards on the ground.

Late in the first quarter, Trent Green connected to Eddie Kennison for a 59-yard gain to the Tampa Bay 11 yard line. Dwight Smith forced a fumble, and Brian Kelly returned the fumble 32 yards for the Buccaneers. The turnover led to a touchdown and a 14–7 lead.

Early in the third quarter, Pittman broke away for a 78-yard touchdown run, the longest in Buccaneer history. Tampa Bay took the lead 34–31 after another Pittman score with 12 minutes to go.

Jermaine Phillips sealed the game for Tampa Bay, intercepting Green with just under six minutes left. Kansas City had one final chance, but the Buccaneer defense forced a turnover on downs with only 1:15 to go.

=== Week 10: at Atlanta Falcons ===
	1	2	3	4	Total
Buccaneers	0	7	7	0	14
Falcons	10	7	0	7	24

Both teams had a record of 6-3, trailing the Carolina Panthers by one game. The Buccaneers started the game with a field goal. After a couple of drives, Michael Vick stumbled over G Kynan Forney's foot and was sacked by Buccaneers' DT Anthony McFarland at the 1-yard line, forcing him to exit the game and allowing backup QB Matt Schaub to step in. On the following play, Schaub was hit from behind by Simeon Rice, causing a fumble that was recovered in the end zone by McFarland. After a series of punts, the Buccaneers added a 45-yard field goal to make it 13-0. Vick returned and orchestrated a field goal drive for the Falcons' first points. Just before halftime, Vick led a touchdown drive, bringing the score to 13-10 in favor of the Buccaneers at halftime. On the first possession in the third quarter, Vick guided a 10-play drive resulting in a touchdown pass to TE Alge Crumpler, giving the Falcons the lead. The Buccaneers quickly responded with a rushing touchdown by RB Mike Alstott. In the 4th quarter, the Falcons tied the game at 20-20 with a field goal. Subsequently, QB Chris Simms was intercepted by MLB Keith Brooking near midfield. After converting two 3rd-and-9 plays, Vick threw a 10-yard touchdown pass to WR Michael Jenkins, putting the Falcons ahead 27-20. On the ensuing drive, the Buccaneers marched down the field, with RB Carnell "Cadillac" Williams scoring on a 9-yard rush to even the score at 27-27 with under two minutes remaining. In a pivotal defensive play, Derrick Brooks leaped over former teammate RB Warrick Dunn's block attempt and sacked Vick at Atlanta's 34-yard line, causing a fumble that was recovered by LB Shelton Quarles. Four plays later, K Matt Bryant kicked a 45-yard field goal to give the Buccaneers a 30-27 lead with 42 seconds left. In a last-ditch effort, Vick positioned his team for a field goal within Tampa's 37-yard line. However, K Michael Koenen's 55-yard field goal attempt veered wide right, securing a thrilling 30-27 victory for the Buccaneers. Vick finished with 21-of-38 passes for 306 yards and two touchdowns. Notably, Vick outgained the Buccaneers as a whole, as they only mustered 256 yards on offense. Carnell Williams was the standout performer for the Buccaneers, racking up 116 yards on 19 rushing attempts. Following the game, Buccaneers' CB Ronde Barber commented on the intense rivalry, stating "Two equally matched teams. There's big plays all over the field when we two play each other." Following their victory, the Buccaneers were tied for first place with the Panthers, who were just defeated by the Bears. Meanwhile, the Falcons dropped down a spot in the rankings due to their loss.

=== Week 11: San Francisco 49ers ===
	1	2	3	4	Total
49ers	0	0	3	0	3
Buccaneers	7	14	7	7	35

Tampa Bay crushed the lowly 49ers 35–3. Brian Griese passed for 210 yards and two touchdown passes, and Michael Pittman rushed for 106 yards and two touchdown runs.

Tampa Bay won their fourth game out of the last six, and improved to 4–6 on the season.

=== Week 12: at Carolina Panthers ===
	1	2	3	4	Total
Buccaneers	0	7	0	7	14
Panthers	7	0	7	7	21

Brian Griese threw for 347 yards and two touchdowns, but mistakes cost the Buccaneers dearly, and they fell to Carolina 21–14.

A Griese interception was returned for a touchdown, and Martin Gramatica's kicking woes continued. He missed two field goal attempts during the game, which brought his season total to 8 misses.

=== Week 13: Atlanta Falcons ===
	1	2	3	4	Total
Falcons	0	0	0	0	0
Buccaneers	7	6	7	7	27

The Buccaneers and the Falcons clashed once again five weeks later on Christmas Eve in Tampa. Both teams were vying for playoff berths, with the Buccaneers holding a 9-5 record and the Falcons standing at 8-6. The Buccaneers were determined to retain their lead in the NFC South, while the Falcons were desperate for a victory to keep their playoff aspirations alive. After the teams traded punts, Buccaneers' CB Brian Kelly was penalized for defensive pass interference, resulting in the Falcons moving to Tampa's 4-yard line. This led to Vick throwing a touchdown pass to FB Justin Griffith for the first points of the game. Another defensive pass interference penalty was called, but this time on the Falcons, moving the Buccaneers to Atlanta's 11-yard line. Simms then threw a touchdown pass to FB Jameel Cook to tie the game. In the 2nd quarter, Vick ran up the middle when DE Dewayne White forced a fumble that was recovered by DT Chris Hovan at Atlanta's 29-yard line. Simms capitalized on this turnover by throwing a touchdown pass to Alstott to take the lead. Shortly after, Simms threw an interception to Keith Brooking. Notably, this interception ended Simms' streak of 127 consecutive passes without an interception, which had started after the same person, Brooking, intercepted him in their previous matchup. Vick then threw a touchdown pass to Jenkins to regain the lead. Simms later threw another interception, this time to DB DeAngelo Hall at Atlanta's 22-yard line, who returned it to Tampa's 13-yard line for 65 yards. The Falcons settled for a 31-yard field goal to end the half with a 17-14 lead. The 3rd quarter saw both teams trading punts. The Buccaneers ended the scoring drought in the 4th quarter, tying the game with a field goal. The Falcons quickly retaliated, as Vick connected with Jenkins for a 37-yard pass that led to a rushing touchdown by RB T.J. Duckett. Cadillac Williams evened the score with a rushing touchdown. Following the extra point, the game was tied at 24-24 with only 31 seconds left. Vick kneeled to send the game into overtime. In overtime, the Buccaneers won the coin toss and opted to receive. However, during the kickoff, WR Edell Shepherd managed to run for 18 yards before being tackled and losing possession of the ball, which was then recovered by DB Ronnie Heard at Tampa's 18-yard line. Duckett carried the ball twice, gaining 8 yards, setting up a 28-yard field goal opportunity for K Todd Peterson at Tampa's 10-yard line. In what would have been a game-winning field goal, Peterson's kick was blocked by Dewayne White. Seizing the opportunity, the Buccaneers marched down for a game-winning 27-yard field goal attempt by Bryant at Atlanta's 9-yard line. However, Bryant's kick veered wide right, resulting in both teams missing their chances at securing victory with field goals. Both teams exchanged punts until the Buccaneers got the ball at Atlanta's 49-yard line with 54 seconds remaining in overtime. Simms swiftly threw a 15-yard pass to TE Alex Smith, stopped the clock by spiking the ball, and then completed an 11-yard pass to TE Anthony Becht before spiking the ball again with 20 seconds left, setting up a 41-yard field goal attempt at Atlanta's 23-yard line. Bryant redeemed himself by successfully making the field goal, ultimately leading the Buccaneers to a 27-24 overtime thriller victory. The Falcons' defeat resulted in a sweep by the Buccaneers, leading to their official elimination from the playoffs.

=== Week 14: at San Diego Chargers ===
	1	2	3	4	Total
Buccaneers	0	7	7	10	24
Chargers	0	14	7	10	31

Tampa Bay returned to San Diego for the first time since winning Super Bowl XXXVII, as Brian Griese threw for 392 yards, but four turnovers foiled Tampa Bay's chances for victory against the San Diego Chargers. Tied 21–21 with 4 minutes remaining, Griese's pass was intercepted and returned for a game icing touchdown.

=== Week 15: New Orleans Saints ===
	1	2	3	4	Total
Saints	7	0	0	14	21
Buccaneers	7	0	7	3	17

Former Buccaneer Aaron Stecker returned the opening kickoff 98 yards for a touchdown (something he never accomplished playing for Tampa Bay) as New Orleans beat Tampa Bay 21–17. Tampa Bay fell to 5–9, guaranteed themselves of their second consecutive losing season, and effectively eliminated themselves from playoff contention.

The Buccaneers led 17–7 with just over 3 minutes to go, but late-game miscues on offense and defense sunk the Buccaneers. Aaron Brooks connected on two touchdowns in the final three minutes, lifting the Saints to victory.

=== Week 16: Carolina Panthers ===
	1	2	3	4	Total
Panthers	7	10	7	13	37
Buccaneers	7	0	7	6	20

Carolina routed Tampa Bay 37–20 in front of an only partially full Raymond James Stadium. Trailing 24–7, Brian Griese connected for two touchdown passes, but the comeback was for naught.

=== Week 17: at Arizona Cardinals ===
	1	2	3	4	Total
Buccaneers	0	0	7	0	7
Cardinals	3	3	0	6	12

Chris Simms returned from injury to start his second game. A 75-yard touchdown pass to Michael Clayton gave the Buccaneers a 7–6 lead. Four turnovers, however, kept the game out of reach, and Tampa Bay lost to the four field goals by Arizona.

Tampa Bay started the season with 4 straight losses, ended the season with 4 straight losses, and finished a hapless 5–11.

== Scores by quarter ==
	1	2	3	4	Total
Opponents	68	91	69	76	304
Buccaneers	48	108	90	79	325
