= 2003 Atlanta Falcons season =

NFL team season

- Owner: Arthur Blank
- General manager: Rich McKay
- Head coach: Dan Reeves (fired December 10, 3-10 record); Wade Phillips (interim, 2-1 record)
- Home stadium: Georgia Dome

Results
- Record: 5–11
- Division place: 4th NFC South
- Playoffs: Did not qualify
- Pro Bowlers: TE Alge Crumpler; LB Keith Brooking

The 2003 Atlanta Falcons season was the franchise's 38th season in the National Football League (NFL) and seventh and final under head coach Dan Reeves. It is best remembered for the third preseason game, in which quarterback Michael Vick broke his leg and was done for most of the season. Atlanta had two other quarterbacks take over for a combined 2–10 record (Doug Johnson and Kurt Kittner). Vick returned in week 14 and ended the season with a 3–1 record.

After a 3–10 start, Reeves was fired by the Falcons on December 10, and defensive coordinator Wade Phillips took over as interim head coach for the rest of the season, going 2–1.

For the season, the Falcons sported a new logo and uniforms.

== Offseason ==
=== NFL draft ===
2003 Atlanta Falcons draft
| Round | Pick | Player | Position | College | Notes |
| 2 | 55 | Bryan Scott | Safety | Penn State | |
| 4 | 121 | Justin Griffith | Fullback | Mississippi State | |
| 5 | 159 | Jon Olinger | Wide receiver | Cincinnati | |
| 6 | 196 | LaTarence Dunbar | Wide receiver | TCU | |
| 6 | 202 | Waine Bacon | Cornerback | Alabama | |
| 7 | 238 | Demetrin Veal | Defensive end | Tennessee | |
Made roster

== Personnel ==
2003 Atlanta Falcons staff
| Front office: Owner/chief executive officer – Arthur Blank; Senior advisor to the president – Bobby Beathard; Vice president of football operations – Ron Hill; College scouting coordinator – Reed Johnson; Director of pro personnel – Les Snead; Assistant to head coach/pro personnel – Marvin Bass; Head coaches: Executive vice president/head coach – Dan Reeves; Interim head coach – Wade Phillips; Offensive coaches: Offensive coordinator – Pete Mangurian; Quarterbacks – Mike Johnson; Running backs – Ollie Wilson; Wide receivers – George Stewart; Tight ends – James Daniel; Offensive line – Rennie Simmons; Offensive quality control – Bill Lazor | Defensive coaches: Defensive coordinator – Wade Phillips; Defensive line – Bill Johnson; Linebackers – Billy Davis; Secondary – Emmitt Thomas; Defensive quality control – Dennis Allen; Special teams coaches: Special teams – Joe DeCamillis; Strength and conditioning: Strength and conditioning – Al Miller; Assistant strength and conditioning – Rocky Colburn |

== Roster ==
2003 Atlanta Falcons roster
| Quarterbacks (QB): 11 Doug Johnson; 15 Kurt Kittner; 7 Michael Vick; Running backs (RB): 30 Woody Dantzler; 45 T. J. Duckett; 33 Justin Griffith FB; Wide receivers (WR): 80 Terrence Edwards; 87 Jimmy Farris; 86 Brian Finneran; 88 John Lewis; 81 Peerless Price; Tight ends (TE): 89 Sean Brewer; 83 Alge Crumpler; 85 Brian Kozlowski; 48 Derek Rackley LS | Offensive linemen (OL): 64 Martin Bibla G; 65 Kynan Forney G; 72 Matt Knutson T; 62 Todd McClure C; 67 Michael Moore G; 76 Kevin Shaffer T; 74 Todd Weiner T; Defensive linemen (DL): 98 Travis Hall DE; 93 Raymond House DE; 95 Ed Jasper NT; 61 Ellis Johnson NT; 97 Patrick Kerney DE; 91 Brady Smith DE; 99 Demetrin Veal DE | Linebackers (LB): 56 Keith Brooking ILB; 54 Chris Draft ILB; 53 Keith Newman OLB; 51 Karon Riley OLB; 92 Terrence Robinson ILB; 55 Twan Russell OLB; 52 Matt Stewart OLB; 50 Artie Ulmer OLB; Defensive backs (DB): 21 Juran Bolden CB; 34 Ray Buchanan CB; 29 Keion Carpenter FS; 27 Cory Hall FS; 23 Kevin Mathis CB; 32 Tod McBride CB; 22 Gerald McBurrows SS; 47 Kevin McCadam S; 25 Derek Ross CB; 20 Allen Rossum CB; 24 Bryan Scott SS; 39 Siddeeq Shabazz FS; 26 Brandon Williams CB; 37 Tyrone Williams CB; Special teams (ST): 4 Jay Feely K; 13 Chris Mohr P | Practice squad: 35 Jeremy Allen FB; 77 Charles Alston DE; 17 Brian Guthrie SS; 16 Willie Quinnie WR; Reserve: 71 Travis Claridge G (IR); 82 LaTarence Dunbar WR (IR); 28 Warrick Dunn RB (IR); 63 Roberto Garza G (IR); 36 Travis Jervey RB (IR); 38 George Layne FB (IR); 73 Dwayne Morgan T (IR); 90 Will Overstreet LB (IR); 59 Sam Rogers LB (IR); 70 Bob Whitfield T (IR); Rookies in italics 53 active, 10 reserve, 4 practice squad |

== Regular season ==
=== Schedule ===
In the 2003 regular season, the Falcons’ non-divisional, conference opponents were primarily from the NFC East, although they also played the Minnesota Vikings from the NFC North, and the St. Louis Rams from the NFC West. Their non-conference opponents were from the AFC South. This was the first occasion when the Falcons played the Washington Redskins since 1994, due to old NFL scheduling formulas in place prior to 2002, whereby teams had no rotating schedule opposing members of other divisions within their own conference, but instead played interdivisional conference games according to position within a season’s table.

| Week | Date | Opponent | Result | Record | Venue |
|---|---|---|---|---|---|
| 1 | September 7 | at Dallas Cowboys | **W** 27–13 | 1–0 | Texas Stadium |
| 2 | September 14 | Washington Redskins | **L** 31–33 | 1–1 | Georgia Dome |
| 3 | September 21 | **Tampa Bay Buccaneers** | **L** 10–31 | 1–2 | Georgia Dome |
| 4 | September 28 | at **Carolina Panthers** | **L** 3–23 | 1–3 | Ericsson Stadium |
| 5 | October 5 | Minnesota Vikings | **L** 26–39 | 1–4 | Georgia Dome |
| 6 | October 13 | at St. Louis Rams | **L** 0–36 | 1–5 | Edward Jones Dome |
| 7 | October 19 | New Orleans Saints | **L** 17–45 | 1–6 | Georgia Dome |
| 8 | Bye | | | | |
| 9 | November 2 | Philadelphia Eagles | **L** 16–23 | 1–7 | Georgia Dome |
| 10 | November 9 | at New York Giants | **W** 27–7 | 2–7 | Giants Stadium |
| 11 | November 16 | at **New Orleans Saints** | **L** 20–23 (OT) | 2–8 | Louisiana Superdome |
| 12 | November 23 | Tennessee Titans | **L** 31–38 | 2–9 | Georgia Dome |
| 13 | November 30 | at Houston Texans | **L** 13–17 | 2–10 | Reliant Stadium |
| 14 | December 7 | **Carolina Panthers** | **W** 20–14 (OT) | 3–10 | Georgia Dome |
| 15 | December 14 | at Indianapolis Colts | **L** 7–38 | 3–11 | RCA Dome |
| 16 | December 20 | at **Tampa Bay Buccaneers** | **W** 30–28 | 4–11 | Raymond James Stadium |
| 17 | December 28 | Jacksonville Jaguars | **W** 21–14 | 5–11 | Georgia Dome |
Note: Intra-division opponents are in **bold** text.

=== Standings ===
NFC South
| | W | L | T | PCT | DIV | CONF | PF | PA | STK |
|---|---|---|---|---|---|---|---|---|---|
| ^{(3)} Carolina Panthers | 11 | 5 | 0 | .688 | 5–1 | 9–3 | 325 | 304 | W3 |
| New Orleans Saints | 8 | 8 | 0 | .500 | 3–3 | 7–5 | 340 | 326 | W1 |
| Tampa Bay Buccaneers | 7 | 9 | 0 | .438 | 2–4 | 6–6 | 301 | 264 | L2 |
| Atlanta Falcons | 5 | 11 | 0 | .313 | 2–4 | 4–8 | 299 | 422 | W2 |
