= 2004 Atlanta Falcons season =

NFL team season

- Owner: Arthur Blank
- General manager: Rich McKay
- Head coach: Jim Mora
- Home stadium: Georgia Dome

Results
- Record: 11–5
- Division place: 1st NFC South
- Playoffs: Won Divisional Playoffs (vs. Rams) 47–17; Lost NFC Championship (at Eagles) 10–27
- Pro Bowlers: 5: TE Alge Crumpler; QB Michael Vick; DE Patrick Kerney; MLB Keith Brooking; KR Allen Rossum

The 2004 Atlanta Falcons season was the franchise's 39th in the National Football League (NFL). It was the first year under head coach Jim Mora. Under Mora, the team went 11–5, advancing to the playoffs. After easily handling the 8–8 St. Louis Rams in the divisional round, the Falcons advanced to the NFC Championship game for the first time since 1998, but lost to the Philadelphia Eagles. The Falcons did not make the postseason again until 2008 and would not appear in the NFC Championship again until 2012.

The team led the NFL in rushing in 2004, with 2,672 yards.

== Offseason ==
The Falcons signed former Oakland Raiders defensive tackle Rod Coleman and former San Francisco 49ers cornerback Jason Webster in free agency.

=== NFL draft ===
2004 Atlanta Falcons draft
Round	Pick	Player	Position	College	Notes
1	8	DeAngelo Hall *	Cornerback	Virginia Tech	
1	29	Michael Jenkins	Wide receiver	Ohio State	
3	90	Matt Schaub *	Quarterback	Virginia	
4	101	Demorrio Williams	Linebacker	Nebraska	
5	142	Chad Lavalais	Defensive tackle	LSU	
6	186	Etric Pruitt	Cornerback	Southern Miss	
7	219	Quincy Wilson	Running back	West Virginia	
Made roster * Made at least one Pro Bowl during career

== Personnel ==
=== Staff ===
2004 Atlanta Falcons staff
Front office: Owner/chief executive officer – Arthur Blank; President/general manager – Rich McKay; Assistant general manager – Tim Ruskell; Director of pro personnel – Les Snead; Director of college scouting – Phil Emery; Head coaches: Executive vice president/head coach – Jim L. Mora; Assistant head coach/offensive line – Alex Gibbs; Offensive coaches: Offensive coordinator – Greg Knapp; Quarterbacks – Mike Johnson; Running backs – Ollie Wilson; Wide receivers – George Stewart; Tight ends – Jeff Jagodzinski; Assistant offensive line – Clancy Barone; Offensive assistant – Robert Prince	Defensive coaches: Defensive coordinator – Ed Donatell; Defensive line – Bill Johnson; Linebackers – Chris Beake; Senior defensive assistant/secondary – Emmitt Thomas; Defensive backs – Brett Maxie; Defensive assistant – Dennis Allen; Special teams coaches: Special teams coordinator – Joe DeCamillis; Strength and conditioning: Strength and conditioning – Al Miller; Assistant strength and conditioning – Rocky Colburn

=== Roster ===
2004 Atlanta Falcons roster
Quarterbacks (QB): 14 Ty Detmer; 8 Matt Schaub; 7 Michael Vick; Running backs (RB): 45 T. J. Duckett; 28 Warrick Dunn; 38 George Layne FB; 44 Fred McCrary FB; 35 Jason Wright; Wide receivers (WR): 87 Jimmy Farris; 86 Brian Finneran; 12 Michael Jenkins; 81 Peerless Price; 89 Dez White; Tight ends (TE): 80 Eric Beverly; 85 Dwayne Blakley; 83 Alge Crumpler; 88 Darnell Sanders	Offensive linemen (OL): 65 Kynan Forney G; 63 Roberto Garza G; 73 Steve Herndon LT; 66 Austin King C; 62 Todd McClure C; 76 Kevin Shaffer LT; 74 Todd Weiner RT; Defensive linemen (DL): 75 Rod Coleman DT; 98 Travis Hall DT; 95 Ed Jasper DT; 97 Patrick Kerney DE; 96 Antwan Lake DE; 94 Chad Lavalais DT; 91 Brady Smith DE; 99 Khaleed Vaughn DE	Linebackers (LB): 56 Keith Brooking OLB; 54 Chris Draft MLB; 59 Jamie Duncan MLB; 55 Eric Johnson OLB; 52 Matt Stewart OLB; 50 Artie Ulmer OLB; 51 Demorrio Williams OLB; Defensive backs (DB): 37 Aaron Beasley CB; 27 Cory Hall FS; 21 DeAngelo Hall CB; 23 Kevin Mathis CB; 25 Kevin McCadam FS; 30 Christian Morton CB; 42 Etric Pruitt SS; 20 Allen Rossum CB; 24 Bryan Scott SS; 26 Siddeeq Shabazz FS; 36 Jason Webster CB; Special teams (ST): 4 Jay Feely K; 13 Chris Mohr P; 48 Derek Rackley LS	Practice squad: 43 Kris Briggs RB; 39 Carey Davis FB; 93 Junior Glymph DE; 77 Mike Mabry C; 19 Kendrick Mosley WR; 68 Dave Pearson C; 71 Jared Peck RT; 72 Steve Stewart RT; Reserve: 64 Martin Bibla G (IR); 29 Keion Carpenter S (IR); 33 Justin Griffith FB (IR); 67 Michael Moore G (IR); 46 Stanley Pritchett FB (IR); 92 Karon Riley DE (IR); 39 Travaris Robinson S (IR); Rookies in italics 53 active, 7 reserve, 8 practice squad

== Regular season ==
=== Schedule ===
In the 2004 regular season, the Falcons’ non-divisional, conference opponents were primarily from the NFC West, although they also played the Detroit Lions from the NFC North, and the New York Giants from the NFC East. Their non-conference opponents were from the AFC West.

Week	Date	Opponent	Result	Record	Attendance
1	September 12	at San Francisco 49ers	**W** 21–19	1–0	65,584
2	September 19	St. Louis Rams	**W** 34–17	2–0	70,822
3	September 26	Arizona Cardinals	**W** 6–3	3–0	70,534
4	October 3	at **Carolina Panthers**	**W** 27–10	4–0	73,461
5	October 10	Detroit Lions	**L** 10–17	4–1	70,434
6	October 17	San Diego Chargers	**W** 21–20	5–1	70,187
7	October 24	at Kansas City Chiefs	**L** 10–56	5–2	78,260
8	October 31	at Denver Broncos	**W** 41–28	6–2	75,083
9	Bye				
10	November 14	**Tampa Bay Buccaneers**	**W** 24–14	7–2	70,810
11	November 21	at New York Giants	**W** 14–10	8–2	78,793
12	November 28	**New Orleans Saints**	**W** 24–21	9–2	70,521
13	December 5	at **Tampa Bay Buccaneers**	**L** 0–27	9–3	65,556
14	December 12	Oakland Raiders	**W** 35–10	10–3	70,616
15	December 18	**Carolina Panthers**	**W** 34–31 (OT)	11–3	70,845
16	December 26	at **New Orleans Saints**	**L** 13–26	11–4	64,900
17	January 2	at Seattle Seahawks	**L** 26–28	11–5	66,740
Note: Intra-division opponents are in **bold** text.

== Standings ==
NFC South
	W	L	T	PCT	DIV	CONF	PF	PA	STK
^{(2)} Atlanta Falcons	11	5	0	.688	4–2	8–4	340	337	L2
New Orleans Saints	8	8	0	.500	3–3	6–6	348	405	W4
Carolina Panthers	7	9	0	.438	3–3	6–6	355	339	L1
Tampa Bay Buccaneers	5	11	0	.313	2–4	4–8	301	304	L4

NFC
#	Team	Division	W	L	T	PCT	DIV	CONF	SOS	SOV	STK
Division leaders
1	Philadelphia Eagles	East	13	3	0	.813	6–0	11–1	.453	.409	L2
2	Atlanta Falcons	South	11	5	0	.688	4–2	8–4	.420	.432	L2
3	Green Bay Packers	North	10	6	0	.625	5–1	9–3	.457	.419	W2
4	Seattle Seahawks	West	9	7	0	.563	3–3	8–4	.445	.368	W2
Wild cards
5 (Note: St. Louis clinched the NFC #5 seed instead of Minnesota or New Orleans based on better conference record (7–5 to Minnesota’s 5–7 to New Orleans’ 6–6).)	St. Louis Rams	West	8	8	0	.500	5–1	7–5	.488	.438	W2
6 (Note: Minnesota clinched the NFC #6 seed instead of New Orleans based on head-to-head victory.)	Minnesota Vikings	North	8	8	0	.500	3–3	5–7	.480	.406	L2
Did not qualify for the postseason
7	New Orleans Saints	South	8	8	0	.500	3–3	6–6	.465	.427	W4
8	Carolina Panthers	South	7	9	0	.438	3–3	6–6	.496	.366	L1
9 (Note: Detroit finished ahead of Arizona and New York Giants based upon head-to-head record (2–0 versus Arizona’s 1–1 and New York Giants’ 0–2). Division tiebreak was initially used to eliminate Dallas and Washington.)	Detroit Lions	North	6	10	0	.375	2–4	5–7	.496	.417	L2
10	Arizona Cardinals	West	6	10	0	.375	2–4	5–7	.461	.417	W1
11 (Note: New York Giants finished ahead of Dallas and Washington in the NFC East based on better head-to-head record (3–1 to Dallas‘ 2–2 to Washington’s 1–3).)	New York Giants	East	6	10	0	.375	3–3	5–7	.516	.417	W1
12 (Note: Dallas finished ahead of Washington in the NFC East based on head-to-head sweep.)	Dallas Cowboys	East	6	10	0	.375	2–4	5–7	.516	.375	L1
13	Washington Redskins	East	6	10	0	.375	1–5	6–6	.477	.333	W1
14 (Note: Tampa Bay finished ahead of Chicago based upon head-to-head victory.)	Tampa Bay Buccaneers	South	5	11	0	.313	2–4	4–8	.477	.413	L4
15	Chicago Bears	North	5	11	0	.313	2–4	4–8	.465	.388	L4
16	San Francisco 49ers	West	2	14	0	.125	2–4	2–10	.488	.375	L3
Tiebreakers (Note: When breaking ties for three or more teams under the NFL's rules, they are first broken within divisions, then comparing only the highest-ranked remaining team from each division.)

== Regular season results ==
=== Week 1 ===
Team	1	2	3	4	Total
• Falcons	7	7	0	7	21
49ers	0	3	3	13	19

- Date: September
- Location: 3Com Park, San Francisco, CA
- Game start: 4:15 p.m. EST
- Game attendance: 65,584
- Game weather: 65 °F (18.3 °C); wind 21 miles per hour (34 km/h; 18 kn)
- Referee: Tony Corrente
- Television network: Fox

Scoring summary
Q1	4:12	ATL	Crumpler 15-yard pass from Vick (Feely kick)	ATL 7–0
Q2	6:17	ATL	Dunn 2-yard run (Feely kick)	ATL 14–0
Q2	1:14	SF	Peterson 23-yard field goal	ATL 14–3
Q3	7:11	SF	Peterson 32-yard field goal	ATL 14–6
Q4	8:57	ATL	Dunn 9-yard run (Feely kick)	ATL 21–6
Q4	6:14	SF	Wilson 8-yard pass from Rattay (Peterson kick)	ATL 21–13
Q4	:40	SF	Johnson 16-yard pass from Rattay (pass failed)	ATL 21–19

The Falcons began their season by traveling to San Francisco, where Falcons head coach Jim L. Mora had coached the last five years as the 49ers defensive coordinator, to play the San Francisco 49ers. The Falcons scored first with a 15-yard touchdown pass from Michael Vick to Alge Crumpler. In the second quarter the Falcons scored again with a two-yard touchdown run by Warrick Dunn. Dunn ran for a second rushing touchdown in the fourth quarter this one from nine yards out. The 49ers did battle back with two touchdown passes from Tim Rattay late in the fourth quarter. At the end of the game the 49ers could have tied the game at 21points with a two-point conversion. Their attempt at a two-point conversion failed as Tim Rattay’s pass to Brandon Lloyd was defended by Rod Coleman. Tight end Alge Crumpler finished the game with 6 receptions for 82 yards and a touchdown; at that time it was Crumpler's second best game of his career

=== Week 2 ===
For the Falcons home opener the 1–0 St. Louis Rams came to the Georgia Dome to take on the 1–0 Falcons. The Falcons started their second drive of the game from their own 18-yard line when Michael Vick dumped a pass off to his full back Justin Griffith. Griffith took the ball all the way to the St. Louis 20 for a 62-yard gain. 4 plays later Vick found Griffith again this time for a 3-yard touchdown pass to give the Falcons the lead 7 to 0. In the second quarter Vick set up the Falcons second score of the game, with a 14-yard run to the St. Louis 2-yard line. Vick's run was followed by Warrick Dunn scoring the Falcons second touchdown of the game. After Jay Feely’s extra point the Falcons had the lead 14 to 0. On the following drive the Rams’ offence moved the ball 82 yards to the Falcon's 1-yard line where Marshall Faulk capped of the drive with a 1-yard touchdown run. Vick and the Falcons got the ball back with 1:06 left before half time. Vick's 3 rushes on the drive for 20, 14, and 18 yards put Falcons kicker Jay Feely in range for a 35-yard field goal with 6 seconds left in the half. The Falcon's went into half time with a 10-point lead. In the third quarter Ram's QB Marc Bulger completed 4 of 5 passes as he moved the ball down the field on an 80-yard touchdown drive. The drive was capped off with a 33-yard touchdown pass to Torry Holt, which cut the Falcons lead 3 points. Later in the third quarter the rams tied when Jeff Wilkins hit a 46-yard field goal to make the score 17 to 17. On the next drive Vick completed 3 of his 4 pass attempts for 48 yards. He then set up another Warrick Dunn 2-yard touchdown run with a 7-yard rush from the St. Louis 9-yard line. Because of a taunting penalty on the kick off the rams started their ensuing drive on their own 10-yard line. On first down Patrick Kerney sacked Ram's QB Marc Bulger at the St. Louis 1-yard line. Backed up at their own 1-yard line Bulger and the Rams wanted to try to make a big play (after the game Bulger said "I was going for a home run,"). When Bulger dropped back to pass in his own end zone Falcon's defensive end Brady Smith got into the back field, and took the ball right from Bulger's hand for a touchdown. Bulger almost got the pass off for what could have been a 99-yard touchdown for the Rams. "I was a half-second away from letting the ball go. ... It could have been a touchdown the other way." Said Bulger after the game. The Falcons kicked one more field goal before the game ended to make the final score Falcons 34, Rams 17. . For the third time in his career Vick ran for more than 100 yards in a game; he finished the game with 109. For the second week in a row Warrick Dunn ran for 2 touchdowns .

=== Week 3 ===
In week 3 the winless Arizona Cardinals came to the Georgia Dome to play the unbeaten Falcons. On the Falcons first drive, running back Warrick Dunn ran for a 60-yard gain that put the Falcons at the Arizona 8-yard line. 4 plays after the long Warrick Dunn run the Falcons took the lead (3 to 0) with a 25-yard Jay Feely field goal. Early in the second quarter Arizona punter Scott Player punted the ball to Falcons’ punt and kick returner Allen Rossum. Rossum returned the punt 30 yards to give the Falcons great field position at the Arizona 39-yard line. The Falcons were unable to score a touchdown on the drive, but Feely did kick a 23-yard field goal to make the score 6 to 0. Late in the second quarter Falcons’ defensive tackle Rod Coleman sacked and forced a fumble by Cardinals’ quarterback Josh McCown. Cloeman also recovered the fumble to give the Falcons the ball at the Arizona 13-yard line. The Falcons were unable to capitalize on the turnover, and Michael Vick fumbled at the Arizona 8-yard line, which gave the Cardinals the ball back with 27 seconds left in the first half. After the Falcons punted on their first possession to start the second half 4 consecutive drives ended in turnovers: • Coleman recorded his second forced fumble of the game • On the ensuing Falcons drive Vick fumbled for the second time • Falcons’ defensive end Brady Smith forced a third McCown fumble • 2 plays later Vick was intercepted by Cardinals’ safety Adrian Wilson Wilson's interception gave the Cardinals’ great field possession. The Cardinals were only able to gain 6 yards on the drive, but Neil Rackers 30-yard field goal shrunk the Falcons’ lead to 3 points. Later in the fourth quarter both teams fumbled again. Dunn fumbled at his own 21-yard line which put Arizona in range to kick a game-tying field goal, but 2 plays later Arizona wide receiver Karl Williams fumbled, which gave the ball to Atlanta. On the Falcons final drive, Vick sealed the victory with a 58-yard run. The rush was the longest of Vick's career. After the game Vick admitted he was thinking about more than winning the game during his 58-yard run. "I was thinking about getting the first down and getting out of bounds... but then I was thinking about the type of game I was having and decided I can make something happen. I wanted to score," said Vick.

=== Week 4 ===
In week 4 the still unbeaten Falcons traveled to Carolina to play the 1 and 1 Carolina Panthers. In the Falcons’ first drive of the game Michael Vick completed his first pass to wide receiver Dez White for 19 yards, and his second to Justin Griffith for 18. Vick's passes were followed by a 38-yard touchdown run by Warrick Dunn which gave the Falcons’ an early lead (7 to 0). On the next drive Carolina wide receiver Muhsin Muhammad had two big receptions for 34 and 23-yard gains. Following Muhammad's 23-yard catch, running back DeShaun Foster scored on a 1-yard touchdown run. Foster's run tied the game at 7 points. The first quarter action continued Atlanta tight end Alge Crumpler caught 3 passes from Vick, for 17, 5, and, 24-yard gains, that put the Falcons in range for Jay Feely to kick a 47-yard field goal, which put the Falcons back on top 10 to 7. Early in the second quarter the Falcons put together another good drive which resulted in a successful Feely Field goal attempt. Feely's 2nd field goal extended the Falcons’ lead to 6 points, and capped off the Falcons third consecutive scouring drive. Late in the first half Carolina quarterback Jake Delhomme completed 8 of 9 passes to put Carolina kicker John Kasay in range to hit a 26-yard field goal with 46 seconds left in the half. Kasay's kick brought the score to 13 to 10 going into half time. Neither team scored again until early in the fourth quarter when Falcon defensive back Kevin Mathis intercepted a Delhomme pass, and returned it 35 yards for a touchdown. Later in the fourth quarter Carolina punter Todd Sauerbrun punted the ball to Atlanta return man Allen Rossum who returned the punt 25 yards to the Carolina 40-yard line. Following the return by Rossum, Atlanta turned to running back T. J. Duckett. Duckett carried the ball 5 times for 36 yards, the last of which was a 4-yard touchdown. Duckett's touchdown gave the Falcons a 17-point lead with only 4:16 left in the ball game. The panthers were unable to score in the last 4 minutes, and the Falcons won 27 to 10. After the game Carolina defensive end Julius Peppers spoke about how they might have paid too much attention to Vick. "We get sidetracked as a team, as a defensive unit, in thinking we've got to stop one person. There's 10 other people out there ... if you focus on just one, someone else will kill you," said Peppers after the game.

=== Week 5 ===
In week 5, the Falcons played the Detroit Lions at the Georgia Dome. The Lions came into the game with 2 wins and 1 loss, and the Falcons were at a perfect 4 wins and 0 losses. Neither team scored until the Falcons’ first drive of the second quarter. On fourth and 6, at their own 36-yard line, the Falcons faked a punt, and punter Chris Mohr completed a 26-yard pass to wide receiver Brian Finneran. 4 plays later the Falcons faced another fourth down. With 5 yards to go for the first down, Michael Vick completed a 10-yard pass to Finneran for the first down. With the help of some fourth down conversions and Detroit penalties the Falcons managed to find the end zone when Warrick Dunn scored on a 2-yard touchdown run. Detroit followed with a scouring drive of their own when Lions’ quarterback Joey Harrington completed a 39-yard touchdown pass to wide receiver Az-Zahir Hakim. The Hakim touchdown evened the score at 7. The Falcons got the ball back with 3:20 left in the half. The first play of the Falcons’ drive was also their last. Vick threw an interception to Lions’ linebacker Alex Lewis who returned the ball to the Atlanta 2-yard line. 3 plays after the interception Detroit running back Artose Pinner ran in for a 1-yard touchdown that gave the Lions a 7-point advantage. The Falcons got the ball back with less than 2 minutes left in the half. Vick completed a 49-yard pass to wide receiver Peerless Price, but 4 plays later the Falcons turned the ball over after an unsuccessful fourth down conversion. The teams went into half time with the Lions winning 14 to 7. The only scoring in the third quarter was a 23-yard field goal by Jason Hanson. The field goal was set up by Atlanta return man Allen Rossum who muffed a punt to give the Lions the ball at Atlanta's 16-yard line. Atlanta kicked another field goal before the game ended. The Falcons lost 10 to 17. It was the Falcons’ first loss of the 2004 season. Vick fumbled 3 times in the loss and had this to say about it after the game:

I was caught up looking for receivers and got careless with the ball. The bottom line is I should have had the ball tucked away.

=== Week 6 ===
The Falcons came into week 6 trying to avoid back to back losses. Their opponent in week 6 was the San Diego Chargers who stood 3–2. The Falcons scored first when Michael Vick completed a 19-yard touchdown pass to Alge Crumpler in the second quarter. The touchdown gave the Falcons the lead 7 to 0. On the next drive San Diego quarterback Drew Brees completed 2 passes to wide receiver Eric Parker for 15 and 14 yards. Parker's receptions helped move the Chargers to the 1-yard line where running back LaDainian Tomlinson scored, on a 1-yard touchdown rush, to tie the game at 7 points. The Falcons got the ball back with 1:13 left before half time, but their drive was ended when Vick threw an interception to Chargers corner back Drayton Florence. The interception gave the Chargers the ball at Atlanta's 39-yard line, and it only took Brees 3 plays find Parker for a 17-yard touchdown pass. At half time the Chargers were winning 14 to 7. The Chargers extended their lead in the third quarter when kicker Nate Kaeding hit a 53-yard field goal to make the score 17 to 7. Early in the fourth quarter Vick completed a 50-yard pass to wide receiver Peerless Price. 3 plays later Vick ran for a 14-yard touchdown, which made the score 17 to 14. The Falcons defense then forced the Chargers to punt the ball back to the Falcons. Atlanta got the ball back at the Chargers’ 47-yard line. 3 plays after the punt, Vick threw a 32-yard touchdown to wide receiver Dez White. Vick's second touchdown pass of the game gave the Falcons a 4-point lead. The Chargers kicked a field goal on their next possession which brought them within one point of the Falcons. The Falcons got the ball back with 5:55 left in the game. They held on to the ball for the rest of the game, and they won 21 to 20. The Falcons sixth game was their fifth win of the year. In 2003 the Falcons did not get 5 wins until their 17th game. "Michael Vick did what Michael Vick can do, and that's run all over the place with the ball and create first downs," San Diego head coach Marty Schottenheimer commented.

=== Week 7 ===
In week 7, the 5–1 Falcons traveled to Kansas City to play the 1–4 Kansas City Chiefs. On the Falcons first drive Michael Vick's 32-yard run got the Falcons into field goal Range, and 3 plays later the Falcons scored when kicker Jay Feely hit a 19-yard field goal to give the Falcons the lead 3 to 0. On the Chiefs first offensive play from scrimmage Falcons defensive tackle Ed Jasper forced and recovered a fumble by Chiefs running back Priest Holmes. The Falcons were unable to capitalize on the turnover, and turned the ball over on downs 4 plays later. The Chiefs were able to get points from the Falcons’ turn over. On the Chiefs drive following the turnover, Holmes ran for 38 yards on 4 rushes including a 15-yard touchdown run which gave the Chiefs the lead 7 to 3. Later in the first quarter Michael Vick was intercepted by Chiefs defensive back Greg Wesley. When the Chiefs got the ball back, after the interception, Holmes quickly got his team into the red zone when he took a pass from quarterback Trent Green 33 yards to the Atlanta 7-yard line. One play after Holmes’ reception Chiefs running back Derrick Blaylock scored on a 7-yard touchdown run. The Falcons fell behind 14 to 3. Holmes scored on the Chiefs next 2 possessions which extended the Chiefs’ lead to a huge 25-point margin (28 to 3). Before the half was over Holmes scored again giving the Chiefs a 35 to 3 lead. The Chiefs got the ball back after half time, but were forced to punt. They punted the ball away to Allen Rossum who returned it 75 yards for a touchdown. Rossum's return was the only touchdown the Falcons scored the entire game. The Chiefs followed Rossum's return with an 80-yard scoring drive which was capped off by Blaylock's second touchdown of the game. The Falcons could not answer back. On their next drive the Falcons turned the ball over on downs again. Following the Atlanta turnover the Chiefs again drove the ball down the field, and Blaylock scored his 3rd touchdown. The Falcons’ next 2 drives ended in failed fourth down conversions. The Chiefs’ final drive of the game ended with Blaylock's 4th rushing touchdown of the game. The final score was 56 to 10. Both Holmes and Blaylock scored 4 rushing touchdowns in the game. The Falcons only gained 222 total yards which was their worst total in the 2004 season. The Falcons also gave up 271 rushing yards which was also their worst total for the season. The Chiefs 8 rushing touch downs set a new NFL record. Blaylock commented on the record setting day after the game, "They had, like, the No. 1 rushing defense, but once we started moving the ball on them we just kept moving the ball. We got in a rhythm. And eight touchdowns later, we've got the record." Falcons coach Jim Mora could only joke about the circumstance:

I am honored to be a part of history. We have done a tremendous job of stopping the run. So it just emphasized how well they played. Their O-line was doing such an excellent, tremendous job, it might not have mattered who was in there.

=== Week 8 ===
In week 8 the 5–2 Falcons went to Denver to play the 5–2 Denver Broncos. The Broncos began the game with a 69-yard scoring drive that ended with a 1-yard touchdown pass from Jake Plummer to tight end Patrick Hape. On the Falcons first drive, Michael Vick broke away for a 44-yard run which got the Falcons to the Denver 23-yard line. The Falcons were forced to settle for a field goal which made the score 7 to 3. Denver got the ball back and it only took one play for Plummer to find wide receiver Rod Smith for an 80-yard touchdown pass. Smith's reception made the score 14 to 3. Early in the second quarter the Falcons got their first touchdown of the game when T. J. Duckett scored on a 21-yard touchdown run. The Broncos next drive ended in a turnover. Falcons’ defensive end Patrick Kerney intercepted Plummer. Following Kerney's Interception Atlanta scored again when Vick threw a 34-yard touchdown pass to wide receiver Peerless Price. Price's touchdown gave Atlanta the lead and made the score 17 to 14. Later in the second quarter Atlanta line backer Keith Brooking intercepted Plummer and gave Atlanta the ball in Denver territory with just over a minute left in the first half. Atlanta was able to get a field goal before half time. On Atlanta's first drive of the second half, tight end Alge Crumpler caught passes for 12 and 18 yards. Vick then ran for a 15-yard gain and moved the ball to the Denver 5-yard line. On the next play, Warrick Dunn scored with a 5 touchdown run. Late in the 3rd quarter, Atlanta's rookie wide receiver Michael Jenkins made his first reception in the NFL. Jenkins’ first reception was a 46-yard gain to the Denver 36-yard line. 2 plays later Vick threw his second touchdown pass of the game to Price. The 25-yard touchdown made the score 34 to 14. On the ensuing drive, Plummer threw for his 3rd touchdown of the game. His 3rd touchdown was a 7-yard pass to Darius Watts. Later in the 4th quarter, Falcons corner back Kevin Mathis intercepted a pass from Plummer and returned it 66 yards for a touchdown. It was Plummer 3rd pick of the game. Before the game ended Plummer threw his 4th touchdown of the game. His final touchdown of the game was a 35-yard pass to wide receiver Ashley Lelie. The Falcons won their 6th game of the year with a final score of 41 to 28. Crumpler finished the game with 7 receptions for 86 yards. Plummer threw for 499 yards in his loss to the Falcons and had this to say about it:

If I had thrown for 2 yards and we’d won, I’d be the happiest guy in here right now.

=== Week 10 ===
In week 10, the Falcons played the Tampa Bay Buccaneers at the Georgia Dome. Michael Vick’s 45-yard pass to Alge Crumpler helped put the Falcons in field goal range on their first drive. 4 plays after Vick's long completion, Jay Feely hit a 33-yard field goal to give Atlanta an early 3-point lead. On the Falcons second drive Vick helped set up a second touchdown when he broke away for a 41-yard run. 2 plays later running back T. J. Duckett scored on a 2-yard touchdown run. Early in the second quarter, Duckett ran for his second touchdown of the game. Duckett's second touchdown was from 1 yard out and gave the Falcons a 17-point lead. The Buccaneers scored their first points of the game with 5:48 left in the 2nd quarter. Tampa Bay quarterback Brian Griese hit wide receiver Michael Clayton for a 25yard touchdown pass, and made the score 17 to 3. In the 3rd quarter Ronde Barber intercepted a pass from Vick and gave Tampa Bay the ball in Atlanta territory. 4 plays after the turnover Griese threw a 22-yard touchdown to tight end Ken Dilger. Griese's second touchdown cut the Falcons lead to 3 points. The Falcons brought their lead back to 10 points in the 4th quarter when Vick threw a 49-yard touchdown to Crumpler. The Falcons defense had 7 sacks in the game. Crumpler had 118 yards in the game which was a career-high. Falcons defensive tackle Rod Coleman had this to say about Atlanta's 7 sack performance:

Sometimes, they had three guys on me. I was just laughing. They were wasting three guys on me, but their quarterback was on the ground.

=== Week 11 ===
In week 11 the Falcons went to New York to play the New York Giants. Giants’ quarterback Eli Manning made his first NFL start in the game. On the Falcons opening drive, Michael Vick ran for gains of 7, 20, and 24 yards and finished the drive with a 6-yard touchdown pass to Alge Crumpler. Early in the 2nd quarter, Vicks threw another touchdown pass to Crumpler to make the score 14 to 0. Late in the 2nd quarter, Manning threw his first interception of his career. Manning's pass was picked off by Atlanta corner Jason Webster. Atlanta tried to kick a 46-yard field goal before the half expired, but Jay Feely’s attempt was no good. In the 3rd quarter Manning moved the Giant's offense down the field and finished it with his first touchdown of his NFL career. Mannings first touchdown was a 6-yard touchdown pass to tight end Jeremy Shockey. Later in the 3rd quarter Manning threw another interception. Manning's second interception was made by Atlanta defensive end Brady Smith. In the 4th quarter Giants kicker Steve Christie hit a 24-yard field goal to make the score 14 to 10. The win brought the Falcons to 8–2. Falcons coach Jim Mora had this to say about Vick after the game:

Mike wins. You look at his record, it's not always pretty in terms of statistics and quarterback rating. You might need to throw those things out when you talk about Mike Vick. He just wins.

=== Week 12 ===
In week 12, the Falcons played the New Orleans Saints at the Georgia Dome. In the 1st quarter Michael Vick threw a 24-yard pass to Alge Crumpler which put the ball at the New Orleans 16-yard line. Vick ran for a 16-yard touchdown one play after his completion to Crumpler. In the 2nd quarter Vick threw a 25-yard pass to receiver Peerless Price. Price's reception moved the ball to the Saint's 1-yard line and set up Vick's 1-yard touchdown pass to fullback Stanley Pritchett on the next play. Saints’ kicker John Carney made 2 field goals in the second quarter to make the score 14 to 6. With 38 seconds left in the 1st half Michael Vicks's second cousin Aaron Brooks threw an interception to Falcons cornerback Allen Rossum. Rossum returned the pick 14 yards to the Saint's 26-yard line and the Falcons were able to kick a field goal before halftime. The Saints got the ball to start the 3rd quarter. On their first drive the Saints offense moved the ball to the Atlanta 19-yard line but their field goal attempt was blocked by Falcons defensive tackle Ed Jasper. Later in the 3rd quarter, Brooks scored on a 1-yard touchdown run. The Saints scored on a 2-point conversion. The 2-point conversion was caught by New Orleans receiver Joe Horn. In the 4th quarter Brooks threw a 7-yard touchdown to Horn and gave New Orleans the lead 21 to 17. With 1:56 left in the game Atlanta was down by 4 points and had the ball at the New Orleans 47-yard line. On their first play of the drive Vick completed a 27-yard pass to Crumpler and on their second play Vick threw a 20-yard touchdown pass to Crumpler. On the Saints final drive, Brooks threw an interception to Atlanta cornerback DeAngelo Hall. Crumpler had this to say about his game-winning touchdown grab:

Me and Mike have a great connection. We work on that all week in practice – the scramble drill. Mike put the ball in a great spot.

=== Week 13 ===
In week 13, the Falcons played the Tampa Bay Buccaneers at Raymond James Stadium. Tampa Bay running back Michael Pittman finished the Bucs first drive of the game with a 4-yard rushing touchdown. Early in the second quarter, Michael Vick threw an interception to Tampa Bay line backer Derrick Brooks. Brooks intercepted the ball in his own end zone for a touchback. Tampa Bay's drive following the interception ended with a 50-yard Jay Taylor field goal. The Falcons’ next drive was ended when Brooks forced Vick to fumble. Tampa Bay recovered Vick's fumble at their own 47-yard line. Taylor capitalized on Vick's second fumble with a 30-yard field goal and extended the Bucks lead to 13 to 0. In the 3rd quarter, Vick fumbled again when he was sacked by Tampa Bay defensive end Simeon Rice. Just one play after Vick's fumble, Tampa Bay quarterback Brian Griese connected with wide receiver Joey Galloway for a 36-yard touchdown. In the 4th quarter Tampa Bay fullback Mike Alstott scored on a 1-yard touchdown run. The Buccaneers won 27 to 0. The Falcons turned the ball over 5 times in the game.

=== Week 14 ===
In week 14, the Falcons played the Oakland Raiders at the Georgia Dome. The Raiders scored on their second drive with a 52-yard field goal by kicker Sebastian Janikowski. Atlanta scored their first points of the game in the second quarter. T. J. Duckett ran for a 28 ran touchdown and gave Atlanta the lead 7 to 3. On the ensuing drive Falcon's safety Aaron Beasley forced a fumble from Oakland running back J.R. Redmond. The Falcons turned Redmond's turnover into points when Duckett finished another drive with a touchdown. Atlanta scored again in the 2nd quarter when Falcons’ defensive tackle Rod Coleman intercepted a pass from Kerry Collins and returned it 39 yards for a touchdown. Coleman played for the Raiders for 5 years before becoming a Falcon. The Falcons went into half time winning 21 to 3. On the opening drive of the 2nd half, Duckett scored his 3rd rushing touchdown of the game. Duckett's 3rd touchdown was from 4 yards out and gave extended Atlanta's lead to 28 to 3. Duckett also scored a 1-yard touchdown to cap off the Falcons first drive of the fourth quarter. The Raiders also scored a touchdown in the 4th quarter when running back Zack Crockett scored a 1-yard touchdown. With the win Atlanta clinched the NFC South division championship. Duckett scored a career-high 4 touchdown in the game.

=== Week 15 ===
In week 15, the Falcons played the Carolina Panthers in the Georgia Dome. Early in the 1st quarter Panthers quarterback Jake Delhomme was sacked by Falcons linebacker Keith Brooking. Delhomme then fumbled and the ball was recovered by Atlanta defensive tackle Chad Lavalais at the Carolina 40-yard line. The Falcons scored after the turnover when Michael Vick threw a 3-yard pass to Falcon's wide receiver Brian Finneran for a touchdown. The Falcons kicked a field goal early in the second quarter to make the score 10 to 0. Following the Falcon's field goal, the Panthers drove down the field goal and scored when Delhomme threw a 6-yard touchdown to Muhsin Muhammad. The Panthers kicked a field goal before half time to make the score 10 to 10 at halftime. Running back Warrick Dunn carried the ball 9 times for 45 yards including a 6-yard touchdown run on the opening drive of the 2nd half. The Falcons scored again in the 3rd quarter when Vick threw a 12-yard touchdown pass to wide receiver Dez White. Late in the 3rd quarter Vick was intercepted for the second time of the game by Panthers cornerback Chris Gamble. The Panthers turned Vicks second interception into points when Delhomme threw an 11-yard touchdown to tight end Kris Mangum. 2 minutes later in the 4th quarter, Panthers defensive end Julius Peppers recovered a fumble by Vick and returned it 60 yards for a touchdown. Peppers touchdown tied the game at 24 to 24. The next time the Panthers offence got the ball Delhomme threw a 43-yard pass to wide receiver Keary Colbert. 4 plays later Panther's running back Nick Goings scored on a 5-yard touchdown run. Goings’ touchdown gave the Panthers their first lead of the game with only 3:41 left in the game. With 1:44 left in the game the Falcons offense faced a 4th and goal at the Panther's 12-yard line. The Falcons were down by 7, and if they didn't score on that 4th down, the Panthers would have retained possession and been able to run out the clock. Vick ran up the middle for the 12-yard touchdown which tied the game at 31 to 31. The Panthers were unable to score on the final drive of the 4th quarter so the game went into overtime. The Panthers got the ball first to start sudden death overtime but on 3rd and 9 Delhomme was intercepted by Falcons’ safety Aaron Beasley. 3 plays later the Falcons kicked a field goal and won 34 to 31. There were 4 touchdowns scored in the 4th quarter. Vick commented on his spectacular game-tying touchdown run after the game

Everyone else had their backs turned to me, so that is why I was able to make it to the end zone. I was lucky to get in there.

=== Week 16 ===
In week 16, the Falcons played the New Orleans Saints in the Louisiana Super Dome. With a record of 11–3, the Falcons were set to be the second seed in the 2004 NFC Playoffs. Quarterback Matt Schaub started in place of Michael Vick. In the 1st quarter Schaub was sacked in the end zone by Saint's defensive tackle Tony Bryant for a safety. The Saints also kicked a field goal in the 1st quarter to give them a 5 to 0 lead. On the first play of the 2nd quarter Schaub threw a short pass to Warrick Dunn, who ran 59 yards to the New Orleans-yard line. 4 plays later Jay Feely kicked a 25-yard field goal. On the Saint's next drive Aaron Brooks threw an interception to Keith Brooking who returned the pick 27 yards to the New Orleans's 11-yard line. Feely kicked a 20-yard field goal to give the Falcons the lead 6 to 5. Brooks’ 18-yard pass to Joe Horn helped the Saint's move the ball down the field for a touchdown. The drive ended when Brooks’ scored on a 1-yard touchdown run which put the Saints back up 12 to 6. In the 3rd quarter Donté Stallworth scored on a 39-yard pass from Brooks. Dunn scored on a 16-yard touchdown run, but on the following kickoff Saint's return man Michael Lewis returned the kickoff 96 yards for a touchdown. Neither team scored in the 4th quarter, and the Saints won 26 to 13. The Falcons’ playoff status was unaffected by the loss.

=== Week 17 ===
In week 17 the Falcons played the Seattle Seahawks at Quest Field. The Seahawks were forced to punt on their first drive and Falcons’ linebacker Demorrio Williams blocked Ken Walter’s punt. The Falcons scored on their next drive when Vick threw a 2-yard touchdown to Peerless Price. Later in the first quarter Seahawks’ running back Shaun Alexander scored a 1-yard touchdown. In the second quarter Jay Feely kicked a 33-yard field goal. On the fourth play of the Seahawks’ next drive, cornerback DeAngelo Hall intercepted a pall from Seahawks’ quarterback Matt Hasselbeck, and returned the pick 48 yards for a touchdown. Hasselbeck's pass was intended for the NFL's all-time leading receiver, Jerry Rice. Hasselbeck on the next drive threw a 3-yard touchdown pass to wide receiver Darrell Jackson. In the third quarter Matt Schaub was intercepted by Seattle cornerback Marcus Trufant. Hasselbeck finished the next drive with another 3-yard touchdown pass. Hasselbeck's second touchdown was to tight end Jerramy Stevens. Early in the fourth quarter Feely kicked a 40-yard field goal. The Seahawks followed Feely's field goal with another touchdown drive. Seattle's scouring drive was capped off by a 1-yard touchdown run by Hasselbeck. On the final timed play from scrimmage, Schaub threw a 3-yard touchdown to wide receiver Brian Finneran. Atlanta's final touchdown made the score 26 to 28 with Seattle still leading. The Falcons attempted a two-point conversion, but Warrick Dunn failed to cross the goal line.

== Postseason ==
=== Divisional Playoffs ===
St. Louis Rams vs. Atlanta Falcons – Game summary

Quarter	1	2	3	4	Total
Rams	7	10	0	0	17
Falcons	14	14	10	9	47

at Georgia Dome, Atlanta, Georgia

- Game time: 8:00 p.m. EST
- Game weather: Played indoors, domed stadium
- Game attendance: 70,709
- Referee: Terry McAulay
- TV announcers (Fox): Dick Stockton (play-by-play), Daryl Johnston (color commentator), and Tony Siragusa (sideline reporter)

Game information
- Scoring
  - ATL – Crumpler 18 pass from Vick (Feely kick) ATL 7–0
  - STL – Curtis 57 pass from Bulger (Wilkins kick) Tie 7–7
  - ATL – Dunn 62 run (Feely kick) ATL 14–7
  - ATL – Dunn 19 run (Feely kick) ATL 21–7
  - STL – Holt 28 pass from Bulger (Wilkins kick) ATL 21–14
  - ATL – Rossum 68 punt return (Feely kick) ATL 28–14
  - STL – field goal Wilkins 55 ATL 28–17
  - ATL – Price 6 pass from Vick (Feely kick) ATL 35–17
  - ATL – field goal Feely 38 ATL 38–17
  - ATL – Safety, B. Smith sacked Bulger in end zone ATL 40–17
  - ATL – Duckett 4 run (Feely kick) ATL 47–17

In the divisional round of the playoffs the Falcons played the St. Louis Rams at the Georgia Dome. On the Falcons first drive Michael Vick ran for a 47-yard gain to the St. Louis 21-yard line. 2 plays later Vick threw an 18-yard touchdown to Alge Crumpler. The Rams also scored on their first drive when quarterback Marc Bulger threw a 57-yard touchdown to wide receiver Kevin Curtis. On the Falcons next drive Warrick Dunn ran for a 62-yard touchdown. On the Falcon's 3rd possession Dunn scored again. Dunn's 2nd rushing touchdown was from 19 yards out. The Ram's offence scored again on their next possession. Bulger's 2nd touchdown was a 2-yard pass to wide receiver Torry Holt. Running back T. J. Duckett ran 3 times for 29 yards on the Falcon's next drive, but the drive ended when a fumble by Vick was recovered by Rams linebacker Tommy Polley. The Rams then went 3 and out, and were forced to punt. Kevin Stemke’s punt was returned 68 for a touchdown by Allen Rossum. Ram's kicker Jeff Wilkins made a 55-yard field goal at the end of the 1st half. The Falcon's had the lead at half time 28 to 17. Early in the 2nd quarter Rossum returned a punt 39 yards to the St. Louis 32-yard line. Vick threw a 6-yard touchdown to wide receiver Peerless Price on the Falcons next drive. The Rams were forced to punt to Rossum again and he returned it 45 yards to the St. Louis 13-yard line. Jay Feely then kicked a 38-yard field goal which made the score 38 to 17 going into the 4th quarter. In the 4th quarter Falcon's defensive end Brady Smith sacked Bulger in the Ram's end zone for a safety. Duckett scored a 4-yard touchdown late in the 4th quarter. The Falcons won 47 to 17. The Falcon's ran for 327 yards which was a new franchise records. Rossum's 152 return yards set a new NFL postseason record. Vick ran for 119 yards in the game which was also a new NFL postseason record. Dunn ran for 142 yards which was the most in Falcons postseason history. Rams safety Antuan Edwards had this to say about the loss: "Every person in this locker room is a little stunned. In all phases of the game, we got whipped." The win was Atlanta's final postseason win until the 2012 divisional playoffs.

=== NFC Championship ===
Atlanta Falcons vs. Philadelphia Eagles – Game summary

Quarter	1	2	3	4	Total
Falcons	0	10	0	0	10
Eagles	7	7	6	7	27

at Lincoln Financial Field, Philadelphia, Pennsylvania

- Game time: 3:00 p.m. EST
- Game weather: 17 °F (−8.3 °C), partly sunny
- Game attendance: 67,717
- Referee: Bill Carollo
- TV announcers (Fox): Joe Buck (play-by-play), Troy Aikman, Cris Collinsworth (color commentators), Pam Oliver, and Chris Myers (sideline reporters)

Game information
- Scoring
  - PHI – Levens 4 run (Akers kick) PHI 7–0
  - ATL – field goal Feely 23 PHI 7–3
  - PHI – Lewis 3 pass from McNabb (Akers kick) PHI 14–3
  - ATL – Dunn 10 run (Feely kick) PHI 14–10
  - PHI – field goal Akers 31 PHI 17–10
  - PHI – field goal Akers 34 PHI 20–10
  - PHI – Lewis 2 pass from McNabb (Akers kick) PHI 27–10

In the NFC Championship the Falcons played the Philadelphia Eagles at Lincoln Financial Field. In the first quarter on the Eagles first scouring, the Eagles’ running back Brian Westbrook broke a 36-yard run to the Atlanta 25-yard line. On the next play Eagles’ Donovan McNabb completed a 21-yard pass to tight end L.J. Smith. Dorsey Levens scored from 4 yards out on the next play. The Falcons scored their first points on their first drive of the 2nd quarter. Jay Feely’s 23-yard field goal shrunk the Eagles’ lead to 4 points. On the Eagles’ next drive McNabb completed a 45-yard pass to wide receiver Greg Lewis and 2 plays later he threw a 3-yard touchdown pass to tight end Chad Lewis. The Falcons countered on their next drive when Warrick Dunn ran for a 10-yard touchdown. On the first drive of the 2nd half Westbrook ran the ball 4 times for 34 yards which helped put the Eagles in field goal range. The drive was capped off by a 31-yard David Akers field goal. Akers also kicked a 34-yard field goal later in the 3rd quarter. McNabb sealed the game in the 4th quarter when he threw another touchdown pass to Chad Lewis. The Eagles won 27 to 10 and advanced to the Super Bowl.
