= NFC South =

Division of the National Football Conference

- Conference: National Football Conference (NFC)
- League: National Football League (NFL)
- Sport: American football
- Founded: 2002
- No. of teams: 4
- Country: United States
- Most recent champion: Carolina Panthers (2025)
- Most titles: New Orleans Saints (7); Tampa Bay Buccaneers (7)

NFC South Teams Location

The NFC South is one of the four divisions of the National Football Conference (NFC) in the National Football League (NFL). It was created before the 2002 NFL season when the league realigned divisions after expanding to 32 teams. Since its creation, the division has had the same four members: the Atlanta Falcons, Carolina Panthers, New Orleans Saints, and Tampa Bay Buccaneers.

Before the 2002 season, the Buccaneers belonged to the AFC West (1976) and NFC Central (1977–2001) (with their four division rivals in the Upper Midwest), while the other three teams were part of the geographically inaccurate NFC West.

The NFC South is one of two divisions to have each of its teams make a Super Bowl appearance since the 2002 realignment (along with the NFC West): Tampa Bay (2002 and 2020), Atlanta (2016), Carolina (2003 and 2015) and New Orleans (2009). Also since 2002, each team has won at least four division titles, making it the only division that holds that distinction. On January 3, 2021, the Saints became the first-ever team to sweep the NFC South in the regular season, they nevertheless lost to the Buccaneers (eventual Super Bowl champions) in the playoffs.

Entering 2025, the Saints have the most wins and highest winning percentage among division members. The Saints' record is 417–480–5; their win in Super Bowl XLIV is the highlight of a 10–13 playoff record. The Falcons' record is 398–512–6 with a playoff record of 10–14; the Falcons lost in Super Bowls XXXIII and LI. The Buccaneers' record is 318–457–1 with a victory in both their Super Bowl appearances, Super Bowl XXXVII and Super Bowl LV, and an overall playoff record of 12–13. The Panthers have the best playoff winning percentage (9–8) of any team in the division with losses in Super Bowls XXXVIII and 50, with a regular season record of 195–204–1.

The NFC South is the only NFC division not to have any of the twelve "old-line" franchises that predate the 1960 launch of the American Football League, the NFL's former rival league. The oldest team is the Falcons, who began play in 1966, and the Saints began play only a year later in 1967. Each of the other NFC divisions has three clubs that began play earlier than 1960, while the remaining three such teams are in the American Football Conference.

The NFC South became the second division in five years to have a champion with a losing record, as the 2014 Carolina Panthers won the division with a 7–8–1 record (The 2010 Seattle Seahawks won the NFC West with a 7–9 record). Additionally, Carolina became the first team to repeat as NFC South champions since the creation of the division. The Panthers were the first team to win the NFC South three consecutive times, from 2013 to 2015; while the Saints were the first team to win the division four consecutive times from 2017 to 2020. On January 7, 2018, two NFC South teams (the Carolina Panthers and New Orleans Saints) met in the NFL playoffs for the first time since the division's creation in 2002. Before then, they were the only division left in the NFL that had never had teams face off against each other in the postseason. In 2024 Tampa Bay Buccaneers tied with the New Orleans Saints for the most division titles, with seven. They also tied with the Saints for most consecutive division titles, with four, and broke the division record of most consecutive playoff appearances, with five.

== Results ==
=== Team Success ===
Team success
Team	Years in division	Playoff berths	Division championships	NFC Championship Game appearances	Super Bowl appearances	Super Bowl wins	Refs
Tampa Bay Buccaneers	2002–present	8	7	2	2	2	
Atlanta Falcons	2002–present	8	4	3	2	0	
Carolina Panthers	2002–present	8	6	3	2	0	
New Orleans Saints	2002–present	9	7	3	1	1	

=== Season-by-season ===
Table legend
Super Bowl champions ‡	Conference champions ^{*}	Division champions ^{^}	Wild card berth ^{#}

NFC North yearly standings and team records
Season	Team (record)				Notes	Refs
Season	1st	2nd	3rd	4th	Notes	Refs
NFC South Division
2002	Tampa Bay (12–4) ‡	Atlanta (9–6–1) ^{#}	New Orleans (9–7)	Carolina (7–9)	The NFL realigned to create four divisions in both conferences with four teams in each division, with the NFC South being created. The Buccaneers moved from the NFC Central. The Falcons, Saints and Panthers all moved from the NFC West.	
2003	Carolina (11–5)^{*}	New Orleans (8–8)	Tampa Bay (7–9)	Atlanta (5–11)		
2004	Atlanta (11–5) ^{^}	New Orleans (8–8)	Carolina (7–9)	Tampa Bay (5–11)		
2005	Tampa Bay (11–5) ^{^}	Carolina (11–5) ^{#}	Atlanta (8–8)	New Orleans (3–13)		
2006	New Orleans (10–6) ^{^}	Carolina (8–8)	Atlanta (7–9)	Tampa Bay (4–12)		
2007	Tampa Bay (9–7) ^{^}	Carolina (7–9)	New Orleans (7–9)	Atlanta (4–12)		
2008	Carolina (12–4) ^{^}	Atlanta (11–5) ^{#}	Tampa Bay (9–7)	New Orleans (8–8)		
2009	New Orleans (13–3) ‡	Atlanta (9–7)	Carolina (8–8)	Tampa Bay (3–13)		
2010	Atlanta (13–3) ^{^}	New Orleans (11–5) ^{#}	Tampa Bay (10–6)	Carolina (2–14)		
2011	New Orleans (13–3) ^{^}	Atlanta (10–6) ^{#}	Carolina (6–10)	Tampa Bay (4–12)		
2012	Atlanta (13–3) ^{^}	Carolina (7–9)	New Orleans (7–9)	Tampa Bay (7–9)		
2013	Carolina (12–4) ^{^}	New Orleans (11–5) ^{#}	Atlanta (4–12)	Tampa Bay (4–12)		
2014	Carolina (7–8–1) ^{^}	New Orleans (7–9)	Atlanta (6–10)	Tampa Bay (2–14)		
2015	Carolina (15–1)^{*}	Atlanta (8–8)	New Orleans (7–9)	Tampa Bay (6–10)		
2016	Atlanta (11–5)^{*}	Tampa Bay (9–7)	New Orleans (7–9)	Carolina (6–10)		
2017	New Orleans (11–5) ^{^}	Carolina (11–5) ^{#}	Atlanta (10–6) ^{#}	Tampa Bay (5–11)		
2018	New Orleans (13–3) ^{^}	Atlanta (7–9)	Carolina (7–9)	Tampa Bay (5–11)		
2019	New Orleans (13–3) ^{^}	Atlanta (7–9)	Tampa Bay (7–9)	Carolina (5–11)		
2020	New Orleans (12–4) ^{^}	Tampa Bay (11–5) ‡	Carolina (5–11)	Atlanta (4–12)		
2021	Tampa Bay (13–4) ^{^}	New Orleans (9–8)	Atlanta (7–10)	Carolina (5–12)	The NFL expanded its season from 16 to 17 games a year.	
2022	Tampa Bay (8–9) ^{^}	Carolina (7–10)	New Orleans (7–10)	Atlanta (7–10)		
2023	Tampa Bay (9–8) ^{^}	New Orleans (9–8)	Atlanta (7–10)	Carolina (2–15)		
2024	Tampa Bay (10–7) ^{^}	Atlanta (8–9)	Carolina (5–12)	New Orleans (5–12)		
2025	Carolina (8–9) ^{^}	Tampa Bay (8–9)	Atlanta (8–9)	New Orleans (6–11)		
2026	Carolina (4–5)	Tampa Bay (3–6)	New Orleans (3–6)	Atlanta (3–7)		

== See also ==
- NFL rivalries § NFC South
