= Brady Smith (American football) =

American football player (born 1973)

No. 91
- Position: Defensive end

Personal information
- Born: June 5, 1973 (age 53); Royal Oak, Michigan, U.S.
- Listed height: 6 ft 5 in (1.96 m)
- Listed weight: 274 lb (124 kg)

Career information
- High school: Barrington (Barrington, Illinois)
- College: Colorado State
- NFL draft: 1996: 3rd round, 70th overall pick

Career history
- New Orleans Saints (1996–1999); Atlanta Falcons (2000–2005)

Awards and highlights
- WAC Defensive Player of the Year (1995)

Career NFL statistics
- Games played: 143
- Tackles: 262
- Sacks: 45
- Interceptions: 1
- Forced fumbles: 7
- Stats at Pro Football Reference

Brady McKay Smith (born June 5, 1973) is an American former professional football player who was a defensive end in the National Football League (NFL). He was selected by the New Orleans Saints in the third round of the 1996 NFL draft. He played college football for the Colorado State Rams.

Smith also played for the Atlanta Falcons.

== Professional career ==
=== New Orleans Saints ===
Smith was selected by the New Orleans Saints in the third round of the 1996 NFL draft. He played for them from 1996 to 1999. During the four years he started 27 of 62 games, recording 91 tackles and 13 sacks.

=== Atlanta Falcons ===
Smith signed with the Atlanta Falcons before the 2000 season. He played for the team from 2000 to 2005. In the six years he started 78 of 81 games, recording 169 tackles, 32 sacks and an interception. He announced his retirement in 2006.

=== NFL statistics ===
Year	Team	GP	Tackles				Fumbles		Interceptions					
Year	Team	GP	Comb	Solo	Ast	Sack	FF	FR	Int	Yds	Avg	Lng	TD	PD
1996	NO	16	17	15	2	2.0	0	0	0	0	0.0	0	0	0
1997	NO	16	29	21	8	5.0	0	0	0	0	0.0	0	0	0
1998	NO	14	12	10	2	0.0	0	0	0	0	0.0	0	0	0
1999	NO	16	33	25	8	6.0	1	2	0	0	0.0	0	0	0
2000	ATL	15	33	28	5	4.5	2	0	0	0	0.0	0	0	4
2001	ATL	15	34	25	9	8.0	0	0	0	0	0.0	0	0	1
2002	ATL	14	39	25	14	6.5	1	0	0	0	0.0	0	0	0
2003	ATL	16	25	24	1	4.0	0	0	0	0	0.0	0	0	1
2004	ATL	16	30	25	5	6.0	3	2	1	1	1.0	1	0	3
2005	ATL	5	8	8	0	3.0	1	0	0	0	0.0	0	0	0
Total		143	260	206	54	45.0	8	4	1	1	1.0	1	0	9
