= Allen Rossum =

American football player (born 1975)

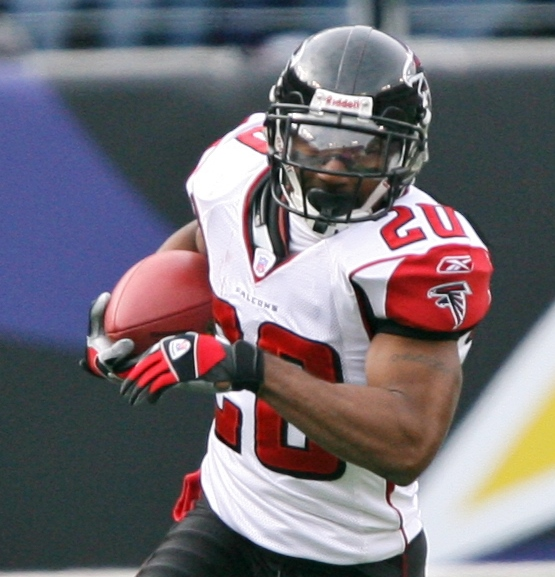
- Rossum with the Atlanta Falcons in 2006

No. 25, 20, 30
- Positions: Cornerback, return specialist

Personal information
- Born: October 22, 1975 (age 51); Dallas, Texas, U.S.
- Listed height: 5 ft 8 in (1.73 m)
- Listed weight: 180 lb (82 kg)

Career information
- High school: Skyline (Dallas)
- College: Notre Dame (1994–1997)
- NFL draft: 1998: 3rd round, 85th overall pick

Career history
- Philadelphia Eagles (1998–1999); Green Bay Packers (2000–2001); Atlanta Falcons (2002–2006); Pittsburgh Steelers (2007); San Francisco 49ers (2008–2009); Dallas Cowboys (2009)

Awards and highlights
- Pro Bowl (2004); NFL punt return yards leader (2003)

Career NFL statistics
- Tackles: 188
- Sacks: 2.0
- Fumble recoveries: 10
- Interceptions: 2
- Return yards: 15,003
- Total touchdowns: 8
- Stats at Pro Football Reference

Allen Bonshaca Lamont Rossum (born October 22, 1975) is an American former professional football player who was a cornerback and return specialist in the National Football League (NFL). He played college football for the Notre Dame Fighting Irish. He was selected by the Philadelphia Eagles in the third round of the 1998 NFL draft.

Rossum also played for the Green Bay Packers, Atlanta Falcons, Pittsburgh Steelers, San Francisco 49ers, and Dallas Cowboys. He was a Pro Bowl selection in 2004. Rossum was one of the most consistent returners in the league during his 12-year career. That consistency put him in the top five of all-time return leaders. During his career he ranked first among active players in both punt and kick return yardage. He is the only player in NFL history to have a kick return for a touchdown with five different teams.

== Early life ==
Rossum attended Skyline High School in Dallas, Texas, where he played option quarterback, receiver and tailback in addition to returning kicks and playing cornerback. He had 580 tackles and 13 interceptions. He also rushed for 1,634 yards and had 12 touchdown receptions as a senior.

=== Track and field ===
Rossum was an accomplished track star as well, captaining his high school team all four years and setting the 1993 HS record in the 100m with a 10.02.

==== Personal bests ====
Event	Time (seconds)	Venue	Date
60 meters	6.68	Notre Dame, Indiana	February 22, 1997
100 meters	10.01	Skyline High School, Texas	June 28, 1993

== College career ==
Rossum was recruited by every school in the former Southwest Conference. He accepted a scholarship from the University of Notre Dame, where he became a starter for the Fighting Irish football team during his sophomore year and served as one of three senior captains in 1997. During his career there, he set an NCAA career record with nine touchdown returns (three interceptions, three punts and three kickoffs). As a cornerback, he tallied seven interceptions, 144 tackles, two sacks and 12 passes defensed. He also ran for the Irish track team, becoming a two-time All-American competing in the 55-meter dash. Rossum graduated early from Notre Dame with a dual degree in business and computer applications.

== Professional career ==
=== Philadelphia Eagles ===
Rossum was selected by the Philadelphia Eagles in the third round (85th overall) of the 1998 NFL draft. Rossum set Eagles records for kick returns (54) and kick return yds (1,347), while ranking 4th in NFC (and 5th in the NFL) with a 24.9 avg. He was selected as the special teams MVP by his teammates. He had 12 tackles and 2 PDs at CB, adding 17 special teams stops and ranking 7th in conference with an 8.9 avg. on 28 punt returns in addition to an 86-yd. return to earn NFC Special Teams Player of the Week. In his rookie season shared punt return duties with Freddie Solomon Jr., returning 22 for 187 yds. (8.5 avg.).

He played two seasons with the Eagles as a return specialist and backup cornerback. During his career with the Eagles, he returned 50 punts for 437 yards and 98 kickoffs for 2,427 yards with one returned for a touchdown (an 89-yard return against the Washington Redskins).

=== Green Bay Packers ===
Rossum was acquired by the Green Bay Packers for an undisclosed draft pick in 2000 and spent two seasons with the team, during which he returned 40 punts for 357 yards and one touchdown (a 55-yard return against the Tampa Bay Buccaneers), and returned 73 kickoffs for 1,719 yards and one touchdown (a 92-yard return against the Indianapolis Colts) and was named NFC Special Teams Player of the Week for his efforts.

=== Atlanta Falcons ===
After two seasons with the Packers, he signed with the Atlanta Falcons as an unrestricted free agent and became the team's all-time leader in kick and punt return yardage. In 2003, he led the NFL with 545 punt return yards. Rossum won the NFL's "fastest man" competition at the 2005 Pro Bowl, where he also made his first appearance for the NFC squad as a kick returner, replacing injured Eddie Drummond of the Detroit Lions. In his five seasons with Atlanta, he returned 154 punts for 1,723 yards and two touchdowns (one a 59-yard return against the Tennessee Titans, another a 75-yard return against the Kansas City Chiefs), and returned 250 kickoffs for 5,489 yards and one touchdown (a 91-yard return against the Seattle Seahawks). During the 2004 season, Rossum also recorded two interceptions as a cornerback and set a playoff record in a win against the St. Louis Rams with 152 punt return yards on just three returns, an average of 50.7 yards per return, including a touchdown where he faked a lateral to DeAngelo Hall.

=== Pittsburgh Steelers ===
In 2007, Rossum was traded to the Pittsburgh Steelers for a 2008 conditional draft pick, but was released after one season. He returned 36 punts for 232 yards, and returned 38 kickoffs for 885 yards and one touchdown (a 98-yard return against the San Francisco 49ers).

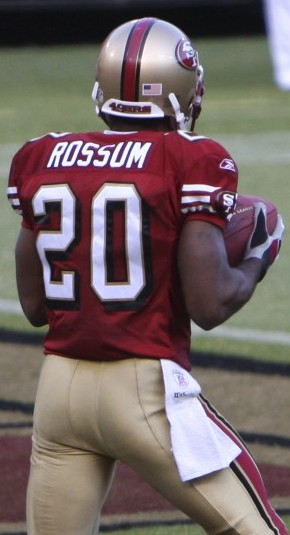
Rossum in 2008.

=== San Francisco 49ers ===
Rossum signed with the San Francisco 49ers on February 29, 2008. The 49ers used him primarily as a kick returner, although he occasionally played as a receiver during the season, scoring a rushing touchdown on a reverse against the Detroit Lions – the first rushing touchdown of his career. Rossum became the first 49ers cornerback to score an offensive touchdown since Dicky Moegle in 1955 (December 11, 1955, vs. Baltimore Colts). He returned 15 punts for 223 yards, and returned 47 kickoffs for 1,259 yards and a touchdown (a 104-yard return, the longest of his NFL career, against the Arizona Cardinals on a Monday Night Football game). Rossum finished sixth in the NFL and third in the NFC with a 26.8 average on kick returns and a 14.9 yard average on punt returns. Due to his strong performance, he was named a second alternate returner for the 2009 Pro Bowl.

An unrestricted free agent in the 2009 offseason, Rossum was re-signed by the 49ers on February 27, 2009. He recorded his 300th career punt return in a game against the Seattle Seahawks, but was ultimately released on October 12, 2009, to make room on the roster for rookie Michael Crabtree.

=== Dallas Cowboys ===
Rossum was signed by the Dallas Cowboys on October 13, 2009. The Cowboys had not used a return specialist in quite some time, and Rossum took over for Felix Jones and Patrick Crayton on kick and punt return duties, an area where the Cowboys had had trouble in the past.

Rossum suffered an injury on his first play as a member of the Dallas Cowboys. In his absence, Patrick Crayton returned two punts for touchdowns. Rossum was waived on November 23.

== NFL career statistics ==
Defensive Stats

Year	Team	GP	Comb	Solo	Asst	Sacks	FF	FR	Yds	Int	Yds	Avg	Lng	TD	PD
1998	PHI	15	24	22	2	1.0	0	1	0	0	0	0	0	0	2
1999	PHI	16	11	8	3	0.0	0	0	0	0	0	0	0	0	2
2000	GB	16	13	8	5	0.0	0	0	0	0	0	0	0	0	2
2001	GB	6	5	4	1	0.0	0	0	0	0	0	0	0	0	1
2002	ATL	14	8	5	3	0.0	0	0	0	0	0	0	0	0	0
2003	ATL	16	4	3	1	0.0	0	0	0	0	0	0	0	0	0
2004	ATL	16	20	19	1	1.0	0	0	0	2	22	11	14	0	5
2005	ATL	10	10	7	3	0.0	0	0	0	0	0	0	0	0	0
2006	ATL	16	34	32	2	0.0	0	0	0	0	0	0	0	0	0
2007	PIT	15	5	3	2	0.0	0	0	0	0	0	0	0	0	0
2009	SF	3	2	1	1	0.0	0	0	0	0	0	0	0	0	0
Career		143	136	112	24	2.0	0	1	0	2	22	11	14	0	14

Return Stats

Year	Team	GP	PRet	Yds	TD	FC	Lng	KRet	Yds	TD	Lng
1998	PHI	15	22	187	0	7	25	44	1,080	0	54
1999	PHI	16	28	250	0	17	39	54	1,347	1	89
2000	GB	16	29	248	0	24	43	50	1,288	1	92
2001	GB	6	11	109	1	8	55	23	431	0	27
2002	ATL	14	24	288	0	10	36	53	1,164	1	91
2003	ATL	16	39	545	1	11	72	62	1,291	0	52
2004	ATL	16	37	457	1	14	75	58	1,250	0	49
2005	ATL	10	17	145	0	12	29	31	702	0	47
2006	ATL	16	37	288	0	13	41	46	1,082	0	51
2007	PIT	15	36	232	0	8	49	38	885	1	98
2008	SF	13	15	223	0	7	45	47	1,259	1	104
2009	SF	3	12	84	0	1	14	7	152	0	40
2009	DAL	1	0	0	0	0	0	1	16	0	16
Career		157	307	3,056	3	132	75	514	11,947	5	104

Rushing and Receiving Stats

Year	Team	GP	Att	Yds	TD	Rec	Yds	TD
2000	GB	16	1	16	0	0	0	0
2004	ATL	16	1	0	0	0	0	0
2008	SF	13	1	1	1	1	4	0
Career		45	3	17	1	1	4	0

Rossum's Highs

- Tackles 8 Atl (9–13–98)
- Kick Returns 8 Ind (11–19–00)
- Kick Returns-Yds. 222 Wash (11–14–99)
- Punt Returns 5 Phi (9–17–00)
- Punt Returns-Yds. 68 T.B (11–14–01)

=== NFL records ===
- Most punt return yards in a playoff game: 152 (2004 vs St. Louis Rams)
- Most different teams to return a kickoff for a touchdown for: 5

=== Eagles franchise records ===
- Most kick returns in a single season: 54 (1999)
- Most kick return yards in a single season: 1,347 (1999)

=== Falcons franchise records ===
- Most Career Punt Return Yards (1,723)
- Most Career Kick Return Yards (5,489)
- Most career All-Purpose yards (7,212)
- Most career punt return touchdowns (2) (tied with Deion Sanders, Tim Dwight)
- Most career kick returns (250)
- Most career punt returns (154)
