= Dez White =

American football player (born 1979)

No. 19, 80, 89
- Position: Wide receiver

Personal information
- Born: August 23, 1979 (age 47); Orange Park, Florida, U.S.
- Listed height: 6 ft 1 in (1.85 m)
- Listed weight: 215 lb (98 kg)

Career information
- High school: Bolles School (Jacksonville, Florida)
- College: Georgia Tech
- NFL draft: 2000: 3rd round, 69th overall pick

Career history
- Chicago Bears (2000–2003); Atlanta Falcons (2004–2005); Minnesota Vikings (2006)*
- * Offseason or practice squad member only

Awards and highlights
- Second-team All-ACC (1999)

Career NFL statistics
- Receptions: 187
- Receiving yards: 2,149
- Touchdowns: 11
- Stats at Pro Football Reference

Edward Dezmon White (born August 23, 1979) is an American former professional football player who was a wide receiver in the National Football League (NFL). White was selected in the third round of the 2000 NFL draft by the Chicago Bears and had a brief stint with the Atlanta Falcons. White attended the Bolles School in Jacksonville, Florida, where he played on the state championship football team in 1995 and the state runners-up team in 1996. White played college football at Georgia Tech.

Pre-draft measurables
Height	Weight	Arm length	Hand span	20-yard shuttle	Three-cone drill	Vertical jump	Broad jump
6 ft 1 1/4 in (1.86 m)	218 lb (99 kg)	32 3/4 in (0.83 m)	10 1/8 in (0.26 m)	4.09 s	6.91 s	37.5 in (0.95 m)	10 ft 4 in (3.15 m)
All values from NFL Combine

== NFL career statistics ==
Legend
**Bold**	Career high

=== Regular season ===
Year	Team	Games		Receiving					
Year	Team	GP	GS	Tgt	Rec	Yds	Avg	Lng	TD
2000	CHI	15	0	22	10	87	8.7	25	1
2001	CHI	14	6	82	45	428	9.5	32	0
2002	CHI	**16**	14	94	**51**	**656**	**12.9**	**76**	**4**
2003	CHI	15	11	**107**	49	583	11.9	49	3
2004	ATL	**16**	**15**	56	30	370	12.3	54	2
2005	ATL	6	3	10	2	25	12.5	14	1
Career		82	49	371	187	2,149	11.5	76	11

=== Playoffs ===
Year	Team	Games		Receiving					
Year	Team	GP	GS	Tgt	Rec	Yds	Avg	Lng	TD
2001	CHI	1	0	**7**	**4**	**30**	**7.5**	**12**	0
2004	ATL	**2**	**2**	2	2	10	5.0	7	0
Career		8	6	17	11	88	8.0	17	1
