= Alge Crumpler =

American football player (born 1977)

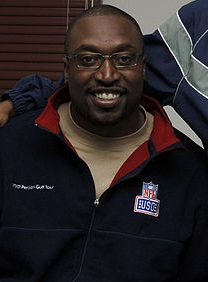
- Crumpler in 2014

No. 82, 83
- Position: Tight end

Personal information
- Born: December 23, 1977 (age 48); Greenville, North Carolina, U.S.
- Listed height: 6 ft 2 in (1.88 m)
- Listed weight: 275 lb (125 kg)

Career information
- High school: New Hanover (Wilmington, North Carolina)
- College: North Carolina (1996–2000)
- NFL draft: 2001: 2nd round, 35th overall pick

Career history
- Atlanta Falcons (2001–2007); Tennessee Titans (2008–2009); New England Patriots (2010)

Awards and highlights
- 4× Pro Bowl (2003–2006); 2× First-team All-ACC (1999, 2000); Second-team All-ACC (1997)

Career NFL statistics
- Receptions: 373
- Receiving yards: 4,743
- Receiving touchdowns: 39
- Stats at Pro Football Reference

Algernon Darius Crumpler (/ˈældʒiː/; born December 23, 1977) is an American former professional football player who was a tight end in the National Football League (NFL) for ten seasons. He was selected by the Atlanta Falcons in the second round of the 2001 NFL draft. Crumpler also played for the Tennessee Titans and New England Patriots. He is a four-time Pro Bowl selection. He played college football for North Carolina.

== Early life ==
Crumpler attended New Hanover High School in Wilmington, North Carolina and was a letterman in football and track and field. His brother is Carlester Crumpler. In football, he started as a tight end and as a linebacker, and as a senior, he was an All-Midwest 4-A Conference selection. In track & field, he was a three-time discus state champion, and won a state championship in shot put in 1996. He graduated from high school in 1996.

== College career ==
After graduating from high school, Crumpler attended the University of North Carolina at Chapel Hill. During his last three seasons with the Tar Heels, Crumpler was named to the All-ACC first-team. As a sophomore, Crumpler caught 24 passes for a total of 278 yards, with four of those catches being touchdowns. In his junior season, Crumpler had 20 catches for 191 yards. His senior season concluded with him amassing 23 catches for 287 yards and one touchdown and he finished second in All-American voting.

== Professional career ==
=== Pre-draft measurables ===
Pre-draft measurables
Height	Weight	Arm length	Hand span	40-yard dash	10-yard split	20-yard split	20-yard shuttle	Three-cone drill	Vertical jump	Broad jump	Bench press
6 ft 2 1/2 in (1.89 m)	266 lb (121 kg)	34 in (0.86 m)	10 1/2 in (0.27 m)	4.76 s	1.68 s	2.75 s	4.43 s	7.38 s	34.0 in (0.86 m)	9 ft 4 in (2.84 m)	22 reps
All values from NFL Scouting Combine

=== Atlanta Falcons ===
Crumpler was selected by the Falcons in the second round (35th overall) of the 2001 NFL draft. Crumpler made the first start of his NFL career against the Carolina Panthers on September 23, 2001. He caught his first two passes for a total of 13 yards. His first touchdown was scored against the New Orleans Saints, on October 21, 2001. He finished his rookie season starting 12 of 16 games and totaling 25 receptions for 330 yards and three touchdowns. In 2002, Crumpler started 9 of 16 games, recording 36 receptions for 455 yards and five touchdowns.

Crumpler earned his first Pro Bowl honor in 2003, starting all 16 games for the Falcons, catching 44 passes for 552 yards, the most for a Falcons tight end since 1980; he also had three touchdowns. Crumpler played in and started 14 games for the Falcons in 2004, who advanced to the NFC Championship Game. Crumpler finished the regular season with 48 receptions for 774 yards and six touchdowns and was elected to the Pro Bowl. In 2005, Crumpler returned to start 16 games for the Falcons, setting career highs with 65 receptions for 877 yards, as well as five touchdowns. He was also named to his third-consecutive Pro Bowl.

In 2006, Crumpler set a career-high with eight touchdowns, while also making 56 catches for 780 yards in 16 games started. Crumpler made 10 starts in 14 games in 2007, in his first season without Michael Vick at quarterback. He finished the year with 42 receptions for 444 yards and five touchdowns. In December 2007, Crumpler was fined by the NFL for wearing black eye strips during a Monday Night Football which had the letters MV and the number 7 written on them in support of Vick, who was in prison at the time.

On February 15, 2008, Crumpler was released by the Falcons.

=== Tennessee Titans ===
On March 2, 2008, Crumpler signed with the Tennessee Titans. He made his debut with the team on September 7, 2008, against the Jacksonville Jaguars. He started 15 games for the Titans in 2008, making 24 catches for 257 yards. In the Titans' Divisional Playoff game against the Baltimore Ravens, Crumpler fumbled after a reception from Kerry Collins on the Ravens' 5-yard line, which helped the Ravens ultimately win the game over the top-seeded Titans.

On August 9, 2009, in the Titans' first preseason game, Crumpler weighed approximately 300 pounds, gaining an estimated 30 pounds during the offseason. However, Crumpler played in all 16 games for the Titans in 2009, starting 14 and catching 27 passes for 222 yards and one touchdown. He was also part of a blocking unit that aided Titans running back Chris Johnson in a 2,006-yard rushing season.

=== New England Patriots ===
On March 24, 2010, Crumpler signed with the New England Patriots. After running back Kevin Faulk, an offensive captain, was lost for the season with a knee injury in Week 2, the team named Crumpler an offensive captain prior to their Week 6 game. The next day, head coach Bill Belichick lauded Crumpler's professionalism:

He's very professional. Alge's really smart. He's into football. He works hard at it. He has a great presence. He's one of those guys that just seems like he always does the right thing no matter what the situation is. Whether it's in a game, in practice, in a meeting, in a walk through, whether it's a decision on the play, whether it's the way his demeanor is at that particular time, he knows when to smile, he knows when to be serious, he knows when to [step up], when to back off, when to gear it up, when to say and do the right thing. He's constantly helping his teammates and making reminders to them or telling them what to do to help them work off of him and so forth. I guess I think the best way I can put it is it seems like he always does the right thing no matter what the situation is. On or off the field, in the locker room, meetings, practice, it just seems like he always does the right thing.

Crumpler finished the 2010 season with six receptions for 52 yards and two touchdowns in 16 games played (10 starts). On July 29, 2011, the Patriots released Crumpler.

== NFL career statistics ==
Legend
**Bold**	Career high

=== Regular season ===
Year	Team	Games		Receiving					
Year	Team	GP	GS	Tgt	Rec	Yds	Avg	Lng	TD
2001	ATL	**16**	12	41	25	330	13.2	57	3
2002	ATL	**16**	9	58	36	455	12.6	33	5
2003	ATL	**16**	**16**	80	44	552	12.5	**63**	3
2004	ATL	14	14	74	48	774	**16.1**	49	6
2005	ATL	**16**	**16**	**118**	**65**	**877**	13.5	48	5
2006	ATL	**16**	**16**	103	56	780	13.9	46	**8**
2007	ATL	14	10	70	42	444	10.6	55	5
2008	TEN	15	15	41	24	257	10.7	28	1
2009	TEN	**16**	14	37	27	222	8.2	27	1
2010	NE	**16**	10	10	6	52	8.7	27	2
		155	132	632	373	4,743	12.7	63	39

=== Playoffs ===
Year	Team	Games		Receiving					
Year	Team	GP	GS	Tgt	Rec	Yds	Avg	Lng	TD
2002	ATL	**2**	**2**	10	5	**75**	**15.0**	25	0
2004	ATL	**2**	**2**	**12**	**6**	71	11.8	**31**	**1**
2008	TEN	1	1	2	2	9	4.5	7	0
2010	NE	1	0	5	3	39	13.0	28	**1**
		6	5	29	16	194	12.1	31	2

== Personal life ==
Crumpler is the son of Carlester Crumpler, a running back at East Carolina who was inducted into the East Carolina University Athletics Hall of Fame in 1980 and the North Carolina Sports Hall of Fame inductee in 2002. His father was drafted by the Buffalo Bills in 1974. Alge is named after his father's favorite book, Flowers for Algernon.

Crumpler is the younger brother of former East Carolina, Seattle Seahawks, and Minnesota Vikings tight end Carlester Crumpler. He is the half brother of A'riana Crumpler, who competed in throwing events for ECU's track and field team and Isaiah Crumpler, who plays football for Rutgers.

Crumpler and his wife have three children.

After his playing career, Crumpler worked as an analyst for the ACC Network and a sports radio broadcaster in Atlanta.
