= Kevin Youngblood =

American football player (born 1980)

No. 17
- Position: Wide receiver

Personal information
- Born: November 22, 1980 (age 45); Jacksonville, Florida, U.S.
- Listed height: 6 ft 5 in (1.96 m)
- Listed weight: 215 lb (98 kg)

Career information
- High school: William M. Raines (FL)
- College: Clemson
- NFL draft: 2004: undrafted

Career history
- Atlanta Falcons (2004)*; Tampa Bay Buccaneers (2004–2005)*; Atlanta Falcons (2005-2006); Carolina Panthers (2007)*; Georgia Force (2008)
- * Offseason or practice squad member only

Career NFL statistics
- Games played: 1
- Stats at Pro Football Reference
- Stats at ArenaFan.com

Kevin G. Youngblood (born November 22, 1980) is an American former professional football player who was a wide receiver in the National Football League (NFL). He played college football for the Clemson Tigers. He played in the NFL with the Atlanta Falcons in 2006.

He now lives in the Washington, DC metro area and works for the United States Secret Service.
