= Brandon Williams (cornerback, born 1980) =

American gridiron football player (born 1980)

No. 21, 26
- Position: Cornerback

Personal information
- Born: November 17, 1980 (age 45); Omaha, Nebraska, U.S.
- Listed height: 5 ft 10 in (1.78 m)
- Listed weight: 186 lb (84 kg)

Career information
- High school: Omaha Central (Omaha, Nebraska)
- College: Michigan
- NFL draft: 2003: undrafted

Career history
- Denver Broncos (2003)*; Atlanta Falcons (2003–2004); Cincinnati Bengals (2004–2005)*; Atlanta Falcons (2005); New York Giants (2006)*; Cincinnati Bengals (2006–2007); Montreal Alouettes (2008–2009)*
- * Offseason or practice squad member only
- Stats at CFL.ca (archive)

Brandon Williams (born November 17, 1980) is a former gridiron football cornerback currently involved in philanthropic work. He was signed by the Denver Broncos as an undrafted free agent in 2003. He played college football for the Michigan Wolverines.

Williams has also played for the Atlanta Falcons, Cincinnati Bengals, New York Giants and Montreal Alouettes.

== Early life ==
Williams attended Omaha Central High School. He played cornerback and running back and earned Class A All-State honors as well as an honorable mention All-America nod from USA Today.

== College career ==
Williams attended the University of Michigan where he played 45 games and started six games at cornerback. Williams posted career totals of 74 tackles (61 solo), two interceptions, 10 passes defensed, and two fumble recoveries at Michigan.

== Professional career ==
Pre-draft measurables
Height	Weight
5 ft 9 5/8 in (1.77 m)	182 lb (83 kg)
Values from Pro Day

Williams signed with the Denver Broncos in 2003.

Signed with Atlanta Falcons 2004 & 2005. Williams played 2 seasons under Hall of Fame Coach Emmitt Thomas and Head Coach Jim Mora in Atlanta.

After Atlanta and stop in New York (Giants) Williams spent the final 3 seasons of his career with the Cincinnati Bengals.

After a full recovery from major shoulder surgery Williams signed with the CFL. Unfortunately He retired due to injury without playing a game.

== Post NFL ==
Since retiring, Williams has been active in running youth camps, including the Warren Academy in Nebraska. Williams coaches football in private one on one sessions to aspiring players in Fort Worth, Texas. He is also a sports commentator with a featured role on an ESPN Detroit radio program.

In 2012, Williams with Mike Keliher created Go Blue Then and Now a social media presence. The purpose of Go Blue Then and Now to raise visibility for University of Michigan and former Michigan players foundations regarding charity events.

He is also Principal in Castle Oaks Advisors a strategic planning firm that works with professional sports figures to maximize strategic planning for transition to non-playing careers. In particular, Castle Oaks works on a pro bono basis with player foundations to help them leverage their resources to obtain high margin benefits for their causes.
