= 2005 Pro Bowl =

National Football League all-star game

2005 NFL Pro Bowl
NFC	AFC
27	38
Head coach: Jim L. Mora (Atlanta Falcons)	Head coach: Bill Cowher (Pittsburgh Steelers)
	1	2	3	4	Total
NFC	0	10	14	3	27
AFC	14	14	0	10	38
- Date: February 13, 2005
- Stadium: Aloha Stadium; Honolulu, Hawaii
- MVP: Peyton Manning (Indianapolis Colts)
- Referee: Bernie Kukar
- Attendance: 50,225

Ceremonies
- National anthem: Jason Mraz
- Coin toss: Admiral Thomas Fargo
- Halftime show: Don Ho, Jasmine Trias and Kapena

TV in the United States
- Network: ESPN
- Announcers: Mike Patrick, Joe Theismann, Paul Maguire, Suzy Kolber, and Michele Tafoya

The 2005 Pro Bowl was the NFL's all-star game for the 2004 season. The game was played February 13, 2005, at Aloha Stadium in Honolulu, Hawaii. The final score was AFC 38 – NFC 27. The most valuable player was Peyton Manning of the Colts. The game holds the record as the latest Pro Bowl played during the calendar year, and formerly the latest NFL game; this record was subsequently tied when Super Bowl LVI was played on February 13, 2022.

== Game summary ==
The game started off slowly. The AFC was forced to punt away its first possession, and the NFC missed a field goal from 43 yards out. Two plays later, the AFC opened up scoring with a 62-yard pass from Peyton Manning to his Indianapolis Colts teammate, Marvin Harrison. The NFC drove back quickly, but Donovan McNabb's pass was intercepted by Joey Porter. Manning then hooked up with Hines Ward for a 41-yard score, and the AFC led 14–0. The NFC came back with a time consuming drive that spanned the end of the first quarter to the beginning of the second, and ended with a 12-yard run by Brian Westbrook to bring the NFC within 7. However, David Akers' attempted onside kick would prove costly, as Ward recovered the kick and returned it 39 yards for a score, the first ever kickoff return for a touchdown in Pro Bowl history. Daunte Culpepper attempted to bring the NFC back, but was intercepted by Takeo Spikes. That interception led to another Manning touchdown, this time a 12-yard pass to Antonio Gates which gave the AFC a comfortable 28–7 lead. The NFC once again came down the field, led by Culpepper, but the drive was not without problems. On the second play, Torry Holt caught a pass but was hit by Tory James, causing a fumble. John Lynch recovered the fumble for the AFC, but the play was negated after a penalty on Marcus Stroud. Akers ended up kicking a 33-yard field goal to bring the score to 28–10, which is how the first half ended.

The third quarter was all NFC, who started off the half by scoring within the first 3 minutes, when Michael Vick hit Holt with a 27-yard pass to make the score 28–17. They later picked off Tom Brady when Lito Sheppard intercepted a pass on the NFC 31. The drive ended when Vick ran it in from 3 yards out, making the score 28–24. Adam Vinatieri and Akers then traded field goals before LaDainian Tomlinson added a rushing touchdown to make the score 38–27. The NFC made one final drive late in the game, but Vick was intercepted (the third pick of the game for the AFC) by Nate Clements, and Drew Brees kneeled to end the game. Manning, whose 3 passing TDs led the AFC's offense, won the Most Valuable Player award while Vick was called the greatest of all time by the announcers.

=== Scoring Summary ===
- AFC – TD Marvin Harrison 62 yd pass from Peyton Manning (Adam Vinatieri kick) – 8:44 1st
- AFC – TD Hines Ward 41 yd pass from Peyton Manning (Vinatieri kick) – 2:57 1st
- NFC – TD Brian Westbrook 12 yd run (David Akers kick) – 12:15 2nd
- AFC – TD Hines Ward 39 yd kickoff return (Vinatieri kick) – 12:01 2nd
- AFC – TD Antonio Gates 12 yd pass from Peyton Manning (Vinatieri kick) – 6:01 2nd
- NFC – FG David Akers 33 yd – 1:45 2nd
- NFC – TD Torry Holt 27 yd pass from Michael Vick (Akers kick) – 11:19 3rd
- NFC – TD Michael Vick 3 yd run (Akers kick) – 4:10 3rd
- AFC – FG Adam Vinatieri 44 yd – 14:19 4th
- NFC – FG David Akers 29 yd – 9:07 4th
- AFC – TD LaDainian Tomlinson 4 yd run (Vinatieri kick) – 5:56 4th

== AFC roster ==
=== Offense ===
Position	Starter(s)	Reserve(s)	Alternate(s)
Quarterback	18 Peyton Manning, Indianapolis	12 Tom Brady, New England; 9 Drew Brees, San Diego	
Running back	28 Curtis Martin, N.Y. Jets^{[b]}	21 LaDainian Tomlinson, San Diego^{[c]} 32 Edgerrin James, Indianapolis^{[b]}	28 Corey Dillon, New England^{[a]}^{[b]} 32 Rudi Johnson, Cincinnati^{[a]} 36 Jerome Bettis, Pittsburgh^{[a]}
Fullback	49 Tony Richardson, Kansas City		
Wide receiver	88 Marvin Harrison, Indianapolis; 85 Chad Johnson, Cincinnati	80 Andre Johnson, Houston; 86 Hines Ward, Pittsburgh	
Tight end	85 Antonio Gates, San Diego	88 Tony Gonzalez, Kansas City	
Offensive tackle	75 Jonathan Ogden, Baltimore; 71 Willie Anderson, Cincinnati^{[b]}	78 Tarik Glenn, Indianapolis^{[c]}	77 Willie Roaf, Kansas City^{[a]}^{[b]} 77 Marvel Smith, Pittsburgh^{[a]}
Offensive guard	66 Alan Faneca, Pittsburgh; 68 Will Shields, Kansas City	54 Brian Waters, Kansas City	
Center	68 Kevin Mawae, N.Y. Jets	64 Jeff Hartings, Pittsburgh	

=== Defense ===
Position	Starter(s)	Reserve(s)	Alternate(s)
Defensive end	93 Dwight Freeney, Indianapolis; 99 Jason Taylor, Miami	94 John Abraham, N.Y. Jets^{[b]}	91 Aaron Smith, Pittsburgh^{[a]}
Defensive tackle	95 Sam Adams, Buffalo; 99 Marcus Stroud, Jacksonville	93 Richard Seymour, New England^{[b]}	98 John Henderson, Jacksonville^{[a]}
Outside linebacker	51 Takeo Spikes, Buffalo; 55 Terrell Suggs, Baltimore	55 Joey Porter, Pittsburgh	
Inside linebacker	51 James Farrior, Pittsburgh	52 Ray Lewis, Baltimore^{[b]}	54 Tedy Bruschi, New England^{[a]}
Cornerback	24 Champ Bailey, Denver; 20 Tory James, Cincinnati	21 Chris McAlister, Baltimore 23 Patrick Surtain, Miami^{[b]}	22 Nate Clements, Buffalo^{[a]}
Free safety	47 John Lynch, Denver		
Strong safety	20 Ed Reed, Baltimore	43 Troy Polamalu, Pittsburgh	

=== Special teams ===
Position:	Player:	Alternate:
Punter	9 Shane Lechler, Oakland	
Placekicker	4 Adam Vinatieri, New England	
Kick returner	24 Terrence McGee, Buffalo	
Special teamer	53 Larry Izzo, New England	
Long snapper	83 Kendall Gammon, Kansas City^{[d]}	

== NFC roster ==
=== Offense ===
Position	Starter(s)	Reserve(s)	Alternate(s)
Quarterback	5 Donovan McNabb, Philadelphia	11 Daunte Culpepper, Minnesota; 7 Michael Vick, Atlanta	
Running back	21 Tiki Barber, N.Y. Giants	30 Ahman Green, Green Bay; 37 Shaun Alexander, Seattle^{[b]}	36 Brian Westbrook, Philadelphia^{[a]}
Fullback	33 William Henderson, Green Bay		
Wide receiver	87 Muhsin Muhammad, Carolina; 87 Joe Horn, New Orleans	84 Javon Walker, Green Bay; 81 Terrell Owens, Philadelphia^{[b]}	81 Torry Holt, St. Louis^{[a]}
Tight end	83 Alge Crumpler, Atlanta	82 Jason Witten, Dallas	
Offensive tackle	71 Walter Jones, Seattle; 76 Orlando Pace, St. Louis	72 Tra Thomas, Philadelphia^{[b]}	76 Flozell Adams, Dallas^{[a]}
Offensive guard	73 Larry Allen, Dallas; 62 Marco Rivera, Green Bay	76 Steve Hutchinson, Seattle	
Center	57 Olin Kreutz, Chicago	78 Matt Birk, Minnesota	

=== Defense ===
Position	Starter(s)	Reserve(s)	Alternate(s)
Defensive end	92 Bertrand Berry, Arizona; 90 Julius Peppers, Carolina	97 Patrick Kerney, Atlanta	
Defensive tackle	97 La'Roi Glover, Dallas; 92 Shaun Rogers, Detroit	93 Kevin Williams, Minnesota	
Outside linebacker	56 Keith Brooking, Atlanta; 53 Marcus Washington, Washington	55 Derrick Brooks, Tampa Bay^{[b]}	58 Mark Fields, Carolina^{[a]}
Inside linebacker	55 Dan Morgan, Carolina	54 Jeremiah Trotter, Philadelphia	
Cornerback	20 Ronde Barber, Tampa Bay; 26 Lito Sheppard, Philadelphia	32 Dre' Bly, Detroit	
Free safety	20 Brian Dawkins, Philadelphia	31 Roy Williams, Dallas	
Strong safety	32 Michael Lewis, Philadelphia		

=== Special teams ===
Position:	Player:	Alternate:
Punter	17 Mitch Berger, New Orleans	
Placekicker	2 David Akers, Philadelphia	
Kick returner	18 Eddie Drummond, Detroit^{[b]}	20 Allen Rossum, Atlanta^{[a]}
Special teamer	58 Ike Reese, Philadelphia	
Long snapper	86 Brian Jennings, San Francisco^{[d]}	

Notes:

^{a} Replacement selection due to injury or vacancy
^{b} Injured player; selected but did not play
^{c} Replacement starter; selected as reserve
^{d} "Need player"; named by coach

== Number of selections per team ==
AFC team	Selections	NFC team	Selections
Kansas City Chiefs	6	Green Bay Packers	5
Baltimore Ravens	5	St. Louis Rams	2
Tennessee Titans	0	Dallas Cowboys	5
Indianapolis Colts	5	Seattle Seahawks	3
Miami Dolphins	2	Carolina Panthers	4
Denver Broncos	2	Minnesota Vikings	3
New England Patriots	6	Tampa Bay Buccaneers	2
Pittsburgh Steelers	9	Chicago Bears	1
Buffalo Bills	4	Philadelphia Eagles	10
Cincinnati Bengals	4	San Francisco 49ers	1
New York Jets	3	Washington Redskins	1
Jacksonville Jaguars	2	Atlanta Falcons	5
Cleveland Browns	0	New Orleans Saints	2
Houston Texans	1	New York Giants	1
Oakland Raiders	1	Arizona Cardinals	1
San Diego Chargers	3	Detroit Lions	3

== Official ==
- Referee: Bernie Kukar
- Umpire: Roy Ellison
- Head linesman: Ed Camp
- Line judge: Chuck Stewart
- Field judge: Scott Edwards
- Side judge: Joe Larrew
- Back judge: Jim Howey

== 2005 Pro Bowl Cheerleading Squad ==
- Heather Joy, Arizona Cardinals
- Kim Kennedy, Atlanta Falcons
- Jamie R, Buffalo Bills
- Shannon McClattie, Carolina Panthers
- Tara Wilson, Cincinnati Bengals
- Brandi Redmond, Dallas Cowboys
- Sarah Silva, Denver Broncos
- Julie Rainbolt, Houston Texans
- Jennifer Trock, Indianapolis Colts
- Jill Cottingham, Jacksonville Jaguars
- Kendrea White, Kansas City Chiefs
- Jackie Villarino, Miami Dolphins
- Erin Frey, Minnesota Vikings
- Allison Preston, New England Patriots
- Deryn Derbigny, New Orleans Saints
- Kristin Medwick, Oakland Raiders
- Monica Devlin, Philadelphia Eagles
- Lisa Simmons, San Diego Chargers
- Jany Collaco, San Francisco 49ers
- Kiara Bright, Seattle Seahawks
- Sommer Harris, St. Louis Rams
- Leigh Vollmer, Tampa Bay Buccaneers
- Jenita Smith, Tennessee Titans
- Jamilla Keene, Washington Redskins
- Brandi Redmond, Dallas Cowboys

== Stats ==
- Most players selected from one team:
  - AFC: Pittsburgh Steelers, 9
  - NFC: Philadelphia Eagles, 10
- Most starters from one team:
  - AFC Offense: Indianapolis Colts, 3 (Manning, Harrison, Glenn)
  - AFC Defense: Baltimore Ravens, Buffalo Bills, and Denver Broncos, 2 each
  - NFC Offense: Green Bay Packers, 4 (Green, Walker, Henderson, Rivera)
  - NFC Defense: Philadelphia Eagles, 3 (Dawkins, Sheppard, Lewis)
- First time selections:
  - AFC: 17 (7 starters)
  - NFC: 17 (11 starters)
