= Bill Johnson (American football coach) =

American football coach (born 1955)

Chicago Bears
- Title: Senior defensive assistant

Personal information
- Born: June 23, 1955 (age 71); Monroe, Louisiana, U.S.

Career information
- Position: Center
- High school: Monroe (LA) Neville
- College: Northwestern State

Career history
- Northwestern State (1980–1981) Graduate assistant; Northwestern State (1982–1984) Defensive ends coach/linebackers coach; McNeese State (1985) Defensive line coach; McNeese State (1986) Outside linebackers coach; Miami (FL) (1987) Graduate assistant; Louisiana Tech (1988–1989) Defensive line coach; Arkansas (1990–1991) Defensive line coach; Texas A&M (1992–1999) Defensive line coach; Arkansas (2000) Defensive line coach; Atlanta Falcons (2001–2006) Defensive line coach; Denver Broncos (2007–2008) Defensive line coach; New Orleans Saints (2009–2016) Defensive line coach; Los Angeles Rams (2017–2018) Defensive line coach; LSU (2019–2020) Defensive line coach; LSU (2021) Defensive analyst; Birmingham Stallions (2022) Defensive line coach; Houston Roughnecks (2023) Defensive line coach; Birmingham Stallions (2024) Defensive line coach; Chicago Bears (2025–present) Senior defensive assistant

Awards and highlights
- Super Bowl champion (XLIV); UFL champion (2024); College Football Playoff National champion (2019); National champion (1987)

Bill Johnson (born June 23, 1955) is an American football coach and former defensive lineman who is the senior defensive assistant for the Chicago Bears of the National Football League (NFL). He was recently the defensive line coach for the Birmingham Stallions of the United Football League (UFL).

== Collegiate coaching career ==
Johnson began his coaching career at Northwestern State in Louisiana as a graduate assistant before becoming a defensive ends/linebackers coach at the school. He then served as defensive line coach and also outside linebackers coach at McNeese State.

Johnson spent one season at Miami before returning to Louisiana as the defensive line coach at Louisiana Tech. He then spent two seasons as defensive line coach at Arkansas before moving to Texas A&M as their defensive line coach. He then returned to Arkansas as their defensive line coach for one season before moving to the NFL. He served as defensive line coach at LSU from 2019 to 2020. Johnson's intentions to retire following the 2020 season were made public on December 21, 2020, but he stayed on staff at LSU for the 2021 season as a defensive analyst.

== Professional coaching career ==
Johnson has served as a defensive line coach for the Atlanta Falcons, Denver Broncos, New Orleans Saints, Los Angeles Rams, and Birmingham Stallions of the USFL.

In 2022, Johnson joined the XFL as the defensive line coach for the Houston Roughnecks. On January 1, 2024, it was announced the Roughnecks staff would not be a part of the UFL Merger.

On January 9, 2024, Johnson was hired to be the defensive line coach for the Birmingham Stallions.

On January 30, 2025, Johnson was hired by the Chicago Bears as a senior defensive assistant focusing on the defensive line.
