= Kevin McCadam =

American football player

No. 47, 25
- Position: Defensive back

Personal information
- Born: March 6, 1979 (age 47); Lakeside, California, U.S.
- Listed height: 6 ft 1 in (1.85 m)
- Listed weight: 219 lb (99 kg)

Career information
- High school: El Capitan (Lakeside)
- College: Colorado State; Grossmont (CA); Virginia Tech
- NFL draft: 2002: 5th round, 148th overall pick

Career history
- Atlanta Falcons (2002–2005); Carolina Panthers (2006); Jacksonville Jaguars (2007)*
- * Offseason or practice squad member only

Career NFL statistics
- Total tackles: 84
- Sacks: 1
- Fumble recoveries: 1
- Pass deflections: 2
- Stats at Pro Football Reference

Kevin Edward McCadam (born March 6, 1979) is an American former professional football player who was a safety in the National Football League (NFL). He played college football for the Colorado State Rams and Virginia Tech Hokies. He was selected by the Atlanta Falcons in the fifth round of the 2002 NFL draft.

McCadam attended El Capitan High School in Lakeside, California (1997). He graduated from Virginia Tech after playing college football at Colorado State University and Grossmont College.

After four seasons with the Falcons, he signed with the Panthers as an unrestricted free agent in 2006.

He was signed by the Jacksonville Jaguars on March 27, 2007. He was released on August 13, 2007.

His brother-in-law is former NBA player Chris Quinn.
