= Todd Weiner =

American football player (born 1975)

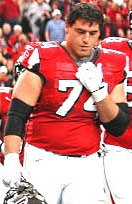
- Weiner with the Atlanta Falcons in 2008

No. 74
- Position: Offensive tackle

Personal information
- Born: September 16, 1975 (age 51); Bristol, Pennsylvania, U.S.
- Listed height: 6 ft 4 in (1.93 m)
- Listed weight: 297 lb (135 kg)

Career information
- High school: J. P. Taravella (Coral Springs, Florida)
- College: Kansas State
- NFL draft: 1998: 2nd round, 47th overall pick

Career history
- Seattle Seahawks (1998–2001); Atlanta Falcons (2002–2008)

Awards and highlights
- Second-team All-American (1997); First-team All-Big 12 (1997)

Career NFL statistics
- Games played: 152
- Games started: 116
- Fumble recoveries: 2
- Stats at Pro Football Reference

Todd Michael Weiner (born September 16, 1975) is an American former professional football player who was an offensive tackle of the National Football League (NFL). He played college football for the Kansas State Wildcats and was selected by the Seattle Seahawks in the second round of the 1998 NFL draft.

Weiner also played for the Atlanta Falcons.
