= Justin Griffith =

American football player and coach (born 1980)

No. 33, 36
- Position: Fullback

Personal information
- Born: July 21, 1980 (age 46); Magee, Mississippi, U.S.
- Listed height: 6 ft 0 in (1.83 m)
- Listed weight: 232 lb (105 kg)

Career information
- High school: Magee
- College: Mississippi State
- NFL draft: 2003: 4th round, 121st overall pick

Career history

Playing
- Atlanta Falcons (2003–2006); Oakland Raiders (2007–2008); Seattle Seahawks (2009); Houston Texans (2010)

Coaching
- Seattle Seahawks (2011); Oakland Raiders (2012–2014)

Career NFL statistics
- Rushing attempts: 94
- Rushing yards: 413
- Rushing touchdowns: 1
- Receptions: 141
- Receiving yards: 989
- Receiving touchdowns: 12
- Stats at Pro Football Reference

Justin Montrel Griffith (born July 21, 1980) is an American former professional football player who was a fullback in the National Football League (NFL). He was selected by the Atlanta Falcons in the fourth round of the 2003 NFL draft. He played college football for the Mississippi State Bulldogs.

Griffith was also a member of the Oakland Raiders, Seattle Seahawks and Houston Texans.

== Early life ==
Justin Montrel Griffith was born on July 21, 1980, in Magee, Mississippi.

== Playing career ==
Pre-draft measurables
| Height | Weight | Arm length | Hand span | 40-yard dash | 10-yard split | 20-yard split | 20-yard shuttle | Three-cone drill | Vertical jump | Broad jump | Bench press |
|---|---|---|---|---|---|---|---|---|---|---|---|
| 5 ft 11 1/4 in (1.81 m) | 232 lb (105 kg) | 30 1/2 in (0.77 m) | 9 1/2 in (0.24 m) | 4.62 s | 1.61 s | 2.66 s | 4.68 s | 7.73 s | 32 in (0.81 m) | 9 ft 5 in (2.87 m) | 29 reps |
All values from NFL Combine

Griffith was selected by the Atlanta Falcons in the fourth round (121st overall) of the 2003 NFL draft. He played four seasons with the team before becoming a free agent following the 2006 season.

After playing two seasons for the Oakland Raiders, Griffith was released on February 23, 2009.

Griffith was signed by the Seattle Seahawks on April 27, 2009. The move reunited him with Seahawks head coach Jim Mora and offensive coordinator Greg Knapp, who were the head coach and offensive coordinator of the Atlanta Falcons during much of Griffith's time with the team. He was released on October 3, 2009, to make room for Kyle Williams who was signed off the practice squad.

Griffith was signed by the Houston Texans on June 16, 2010.

== Coaching career ==
He was a season-long coaching intern with the Seattle Seahawks for the 2011 season.

In February 2012, Griffith returned to the Raiders, this time as an offensive quality control coach.
