= 2006 Tampa Bay Buccaneers season =

NFL team season

- Owner: Malcolm Glazer
- Head coach: Jon Gruden
- Home stadium: Raymond James Stadium

Results
- Record: 4–12
- Division place: 4th NFC South
- Playoffs: Did not qualify
- All-Pros: CB Ronde Barber (2nd team)
- Pro Bowlers: 3: CB Ronde Barber; LB Derrick Brooks; LS Dave Moore
- Team MVP: WR Joey Galloway

The 2006 Tampa Bay Buccaneers season was the franchise's 31st season in the National Football League (NFL), the 9th playing their home games at Raymond James Stadium, and the 5th under head coach Jon Gruden.

The team failed to improve on their 11–5 record in 2005, tumbled to a 4–12 record and missed the playoffs for the third time in four seasons.

== Summary ==
After winning their division in 2005, the Buccaneers suffered through an abysmal 2006 season. The season was plagued by injuries, with starters such as guard Dan Buenning, wide receiver Michael Clayton, running back Carnell Williams, defensive end Simeon Rice, cornerback Brian Kelly, and quarterback Chris Simms all being placed on injured reserve at some point in the season. The season also saw a lot of rookies starting for the Buccaneers, such as quarterback Bruce Gradkowski, tackle Jeremy Trueblood, and guard Davin Joseph. The league schedule was also unfriendly to the Buccaneers, scheduling them for 3 games (two of them away games) within 11 days of each other.

There was more to the lost season than just injuries, as most of the players put on injured reserve had been done so after the team's 0–3 start, and offensive shutouts in the first two games in which no touchdowns were scored by the Buccaneers. The departure of several key defensive coaches and assistants didn't bode well with players, who complained to some in the media of not being able to hear coaches in team meetings.

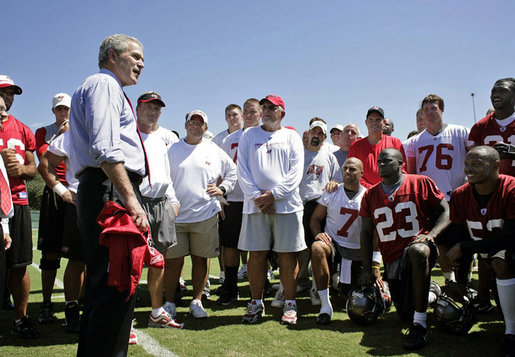
President George W. Bush visits the Buccaneers at practice before their week 3 game against the Carolina Panthers

Inconsistent and unorganized are how some players referred to one of the newcomers, who most players had a hard time making the transition from longtime favorites Rod Marinelli and others. Some believe the problems in 2006 were rooted in recent years mistakes, lack of salary cap room to bring in high impact free agents, lack of top 50 draft picks over the last 5 or 6 years due to trades, and maybe even a failure to properly assess talent resulting in a lack of contribution from second day draft picks in recent history.

The Buccaneers started off the season 0–3, with quarterback Chris Simms throwing only 1 touchdown to 7 interceptions. In the third game of the season, a last-minute loss to the Carolina Panthers, Simms's spleen was ruptured, and he was placed on injured reserve for the rest of the season. After their bye week, the Bucs elected to start rookie quarterback Bruce Gradkowski, a 6th-round pick from Toledo.

Gradkowski started off performing decently. People who in hindsight claim the Buccaneers should have started the more experienced Tim Rattay forget the Buccaneers nearly upset the New Orleans Saints, and then went on to win two narrow victories: one, against the Cincinnati Bengals, winning on an overturned call resulting in a touchdown; and another against the Philadelphia Eagles, thanks to Matt Bryant’s 62-yard field goal. After these victories, though, Gradkowski's performance declined. After a 17–3 loss to the New York Giants in heavy winds, the Buccaneers proceeded to lose 5 of their next 6 games, leading them to a record of 3–10 (0–6 in their division). In the loss to the Atlanta Falcons, Gradkowski was replaced in the 4th quarter by Rattay.

In the first half of the Buccaneers' next game, against the Chicago Bears, Gradkowski was again replaced by Rattay, who led the team from a 24–3 deficit to a score of 31–31, with three touchdowns in the fourth quarter. However, the Buccaneers then lost the game in overtime, 34–31. Rattay was then named the new starting quarterback for the last two games for the season. The Buccaneers finished their season with a 4–12 record, tied for third worst in the NFL. The overall defense was ranked in the low 20s, the first time a Tampa Bay defense was not ranked in the top ten since 1996.

The Buccaneers sent three players to the 2007 Pro Bowl, cornerback Ronde Barber, tight end/long snapper Dave Moore (A "Need" player according to Saints coach Sean Payton), and late addition outside linebacker Derrick Brooks (as an injury replacement). This would be Brooks's 10th consecutive Pro Bowl and 10th Pro Bowl overall.

It was also the final season for longtime fullback Mike Alstott. Although he was on the roster the following season, he was unable to play due to a preseason neck injury against New England.

== Offseason ==
In the 2006 NFL draft, the Buccaneers used their first pick on Oklahoma Guard Davin Joseph. They then used their next pick on Boston College offensive tackle Jeremy Trueblood. The rest of their picks included Notre Dame wide receiver Maurice Stovall, Penn State cornerback Alan Zemaitis, Stanford defensive end Julian Jenkins, Toledo quarterback Bruce Gradkowski, North Carolina State tight end T.J. Williams (who was lost for the upcoming season to injury when he tore his right Achilles tendon the week of June 19), Oregon cornerback Justin Phinisee, Clemson defensive end Charles Bennett, and Michigan tight end Tim Massaquoi.

After a potential season-ending injury to backup quarterback Luke McCown, the Buccaneers signed veteran quarterback Jay Fiedler to back up Chris Simms on June 29. The signing maintains the four-deep status of the backup quarterback position, as Tim Rattay, Jared Allen, and Bruce Gradkowski are still on the roster (as of July 18). Additionally, the team signed two-year veteran tight end Matt Kranchick to replace T.J. Williams, who was lost for the season due to injury, as noted above.

== Staff ==
2006 Tampa Bay Buccaneers staff
Front office: Owner/President – Malcolm Glazer; Director of Pro Personnel - Mark Dominik; Director of Coleege Scouting - Dennis Hickey; Head coaches: Head coach – Jon Gruden; Assistant head coach/running backs – Art Valero; Assistant to the head coach/football operations – Paul Kelly; Offensive coaches: Offensive coordinator/offensive line – Bill Muir; Quarterbacks – Paul Hackett; Wide receivers – Richard Mann; Tight ends/assistant special teams – Ron Middleton; Senior assistant/offensive line – Aaron Kromer; Offensive assistant – Jay Gruden; Offensive quality control – Tim Berbenich; Offensive quality control – Nathaniel Hackett	Defensive coaches: Defensive coordinator – Monte Kiffin; Defensive line – Jethro Franklin; Linebackers – Joe Barry; Defensive backs – Greg Burns; Assistant defensive backs – Jimmy Lake; Defensive quality control – Gus Bradley; Special teams coaches: Special teams coordinator – Richard Bisaccia; Coaching assistant – Dwayne Stukes; Strength and conditioning: Head strength and conditioning – Mike Morris; Assistant strength and conditioning – Kurtis Shultz

== Roster ==
2006 Tampa Bay Buccaneers roster
Quarterbacks (QB): 5 Bruce Gradkowski; 12 Luke McCown; 13 Tim Rattay; Running backs (RB): 40 Mike Alstott FB; 28 Lionel Gates; 34 Earnest Graham; 32 Michael Pittman KR; 33 Jerald Sowell FB; 24 Cadillac Williams; Wide receivers (WR): 84 Joey Galloway; 19 Ike Hilliard PR; 89 Mark Jones PR; 85 Maurice Stovall; 82 Paris Warren; Tight ends (TE): 88 Anthony Becht; 86 Doug Jolley; 83 Dave Moore LS; 81 Alex Smith	Offensive linemen (OL): 69 Anthony Davis T; 74 Cornell Green T; 75 Davin Joseph G; 79 Sean Mahan G; 66 Nick Mihlhauser C; 70 Donald Penn T; 77 Jeb Terry G; 65 Jeremy Trueblood T; 76 John Wade C; Defensive linemen (DL): 93 Charles Bennett DE; 98 Jon Bradley DT; 60 Darrell Campbell DT; 71 Jovan Haye DE; 95 Chris Hovan DT; 94 Greg Spires DE; 90 Dewayne White DE; 96 Ellis Wyms DT	Linebackers (LB): 55 Derrick Brooks OLB; 52 Antoine Cash OLB; 54 Wesly Mallard OLB; 56 Ryan Nece OLB; 53 Shelton Quarles MLB/OLB; 51 Barrett Ruud MLB; 50 Jamie Winborn OLB; Defensive backs (DB): 46 Blue Adams CB; 26 Will Allen FS; 20 Ronde Barber CB; 21 Juran Bolden CB; 31 Phillip Buchanon CB/PR; 27 Torrie Cox CB; 30 Donte Nicholson SS; 39 Kalvin Pearson FS; 23 Jermaine Phillips SS; Special teams (ST): 9 Josh Bidwell P; 3 Matt Bryant K	Practice squad: 62 Jonathan Clinkscale G; 18 Chas Gessner WR; 44 Jon Goldsberry FB; 87 Keith Heinrich TE; 37 Carlos Hendricks CB; 15 Chad Lucas WR; 73 Dennis Roland T; Reserve: 72 Dan Buenning G (IR); 80 Michael Clayton WR (IR); 48 Andrew Economos LS (IR); 91 Julian Jenkins DE (IR); 25 Brian Kelly CB (IR); 97 Simeon Rice DE (IR); 2 Chris Simms QB (IR); 67 Kenyatta Walker T (IR); 61 Chris Colmer T (NF-Ill.); 45 T. J. Williams TE (IR); 29 Alan Zemaitis CB (IR); Rookies in italics 53 active, 11 reserve, 7 practice squad

== Preseason ==
The Tampa Bay Buccaneers played four preseason games. The home team is in capital letters.

- August 11 BUCCANEERS 16, Jets 3
- August 19 Dolphins 13, BUCCANEERS 10
- August 26 Jaguars 29, Buccaneers 18
- August 31 Texans 16, Buccaneers 13

== Schedule ==
In the 2006 regular season, the Bucs’ non-divisional conference opponents were primarily from the NFC East, although they also played the Seattle Seahawks who headed the 2005 NFC West, and the Chicago Bears who had headed the 2005 NFC North. Their non-conference opponents were from the AFC North.

Week	Date	Kickoff (ET)	Opponent	Results		Game Site	TV
Week	Date	Kickoff (ET)	Opponent	Final score	Team record	Game Site	TV
1	September 10	1:00 pm	Baltimore Ravens	**L** 0–27	0–1	Raymond James Stadium	CBS
2	September 17	1:00 pm	at **Atlanta Falcons**	**L** 3–14	0–2	Georgia Dome	Fox
3	September 24	1:00 pm	**Carolina Panthers**	**L** 24–26	0–3	Raymond James Stadium	Fox
4	Bye Week						
5	October 8	1:00 pm	at **New Orleans Saints**	**L** 21–24	0–4	Louisiana Superdome	Fox
6	October 15	1:00 pm	Cincinnati Bengals	**W** 14–13	1–4	Raymond James Stadium	CBS
7	October 22	1:00 pm	Philadelphia Eagles	**W** 23–21	2–4	Raymond James Stadium	Fox
8	October 29	1:00 pm	at New York Giants	**L** 3–17	2–5	Giants Stadium	Fox
9	November 5	1:00 pm	**New Orleans Saints**	**L** 14–31	2–6	Raymond James Stadium	Fox
10	November 13	8:00 pm	at **Carolina Panthers**	**L** 10–24	2–7	Bank of America Stadium	ESPN
11	November 19	1:00 pm	Washington Redskins	**W** 20–17	3–7	Raymond James Stadium	Fox
12	November 23	4:15 pm	at Dallas Cowboys	**L** 10–38	3–8	Texas Stadium	Fox
13	December 3	4:15 pm	at Pittsburgh Steelers	**L** 3–20	3–9	Heinz Field	Fox
14	December 10	1:00 pm	**Atlanta Falcons**	**L** 6–17	3–10	Raymond James Stadium	Fox
15	December 17	1:00 pm	at Chicago Bears	**L** 31–34 (OT)	3–11	Soldier Field	Fox
16	December 24	1:00 pm	at Cleveland Browns	**W** 22–7	4–11	Cleveland Browns Stadium	Fox
17	December 31	1:00 pm	Seattle Seahawks	**L** 7–23	4–12	Raymond James Stadium	Fox
Division games are in **bold** text.

Indicates the Thanksgiving Day game.
Indicates game is Monday Night Football.

== Standings ==
NFC South
	W	L	T	PCT	DIV	CONF	PF	PA	STK
^{(2)} New Orleans Saints	10	6	0	.625	4–2	9–3	413	322	L1
Carolina Panthers	8	8	0	.500	5–1	6–6	270	305	W2
Atlanta Falcons	7	9	0	.438	3–3	5–7	292	328	L3
Tampa Bay Buccaneers	4	12	0	.250	0–6	2–10	211	353	L1

== Regular season ==
=== Week 1: vs. Baltimore Ravens ===
Quarter	1	2	3	4	Total
Ravens	7	10	3	7	27
Buccaneers	0	0	0	0	0

at Raymond James Stadium

- Game time: 1:00 PM EDT
- Game attendance: 65,087
- TV announcers (CBS): Kevin Harlan and Rich Gannon

The Buccaneers opened the regular season at home against the Baltimore Ravens on September 10 by being shutout for the first time since Week 14 of the 2005 season. The game began with the Ravens scoring a touchdown after a clock-killing 80-yard drive, and the Buccaneers were never able to respond. Buccaneers quarterback Chris Simms threw three interceptions and many of his passes were batted down at the line of scrimmage, an issue that was present during the pre-season and would continue to plague Simms in the next two games. In addition, second-year running back Carnell Williams struggled with back spasms and was held to just 22 rushing yards on 8 carries.

=== Week 2: at Atlanta Falcons ===
Quarter	1	2	3	4	Total
Buccaneers	0	3	0	0	3
Falcons	7	7	0	0	14

at Georgia Dome

- Game time: 1:00 PM EDT
- Game weather: Indoor
- Game attendance: 70,828
- TV announcers (Fox): Kenny Albert and Brian Baldinger

The Bucs went to the Georgia Dome for a Week 2 contest against their division rival, Atlanta Falcons. Historically, the Buccaneers had been able to effectively contain Falcons' quarterback Michael Vick, shutting down the Falcons' offense in the process. However, the Buccaneers' performance here had not improved much from Week 1. The defense was unable to stop the running duo of Vick and running back Warrick Dunn, whose combined performance netted 261 yards, and 306 for Atlanta as a team—a new Falcons team record. Also illustrating their sharp fall in performance from their #1 NFL ranking the previous season, the Buccaneers' defense also allowed a 1-yard quarterback touchdown run by Vick and a 4-yard touchdown pass to fullback Fred McCrary. Buccaneers quarterback Chris Simms continued to struggle, throwing another three interceptions, while Carnell Williams was held to just 37 yards on 15 carries. The Buccaneers' only points came on a chip-shot 22-yard field goal by kicker Matt Bryant.

=== Week 3: vs. Carolina Panthers ===
Quarter	1	2	3	4	Total
Panthers	10	10	3	3	26
Buccaneers	0	7	14	3	24

at Raymond James Stadium

- Game time: 1:00 PM EDT
- Game attendance: 65,423
- TV announcers (Fox): Matt Vasgersian and J.C. Pearson

The Bucs played one of their most heated rivals, the Carolina Panthers, at home. In the first half, it was a rout 20–7 with Buccaneers quarterback Chris Simms' first pass intercepted by the Panthers' Chris Gamble. In the second quarter, Tampa Bay finally scored its first touchdown of the season on a short pass from Simms to Joey Galloway, then followed that up in the third quarter with Carnell Williams scoring his first touchdown run of the season. Later that quarter, Simms led a drive that was wrapped up by a 2-yard bootleg by Simms on a fake to Mike Alstott, but Simms was hit hard on the play, and had to leave the game momentarily to let rookie Bruce Gradkowski take over. Simms returned in the fourth quarter to lead another scoring drive which ended with a long field goal by Matt Bryant. Unfortunately for the Bucs, the Panthers' kicker John Kasay hit his fourth field goal of the day, winning the game for the Panthers with only six seconds to spare. After the game, it was learned that Simms had a ruptured spleen and went into emergency surgery to remove it. Originally diagnosed as bruised ribs, it was only discovered shortly after the game ended. If discovery had been delayed any longer, Simms would have died. The injury cost Simms the rest of the season.

=== Week 4: Open date ===
The Buccaneers bye week was scheduled for week 4.

=== Week 5: at New Orleans Saints ===
Quarter	1	2	3	4	Total
Buccaneers	7	0	7	7	21
Saints	3	7	7	7	24

at Louisiana Superdome

- Game time: 1:00 PM EDT
- Game weather: Indoor
- Game attendance: 68,183
- TV announcers (Fox): Ron Pitts and J.C. Pearson

Coming off their bye week, the Buccaneers were still looking for their first win of the season. The Buccaneers traveled to the Louisiana Superdome for their third divisional match-up in a row—this time, against the New Orleans Saints. The Buccaneers scored first as rookie quarterback Bruce Gradkowski threw an 18-yard touchdown pass to wide receiver Joey Galloway in the first quarter; the Saints responded with a 21-yard field goal from kicker John Carney. The Saints continued scoring, with a 24-yard touchdown run from running back Deuce McAllister in the second quarter, and a 9-yard touchdown pass to tight end Ernie Conwell in the third quarter. The Buccaneers finally responded with a 1-yard touchdown run from fullback Mike Alstott, and took the lead in the fourth quarter with Gradkowski's 3-yard touchdown pass to tight end Alex Smith. Unfortunately for the Buccaneers, a special teams breakdown led to Saints running back Reggie Bush getting his inaugural NFL touchdown on a 65-yard punt return, which sealed the win for the Saints.

=== Week 6: vs. Cincinnati Bengals ===
Quarter	1	2	3	4	Total
Bengals	0	7	3	3	13
Buccaneers	0	0	7	7	14

at Raymond James Stadium

- Game time: 1:00 PM EDT
- Game attendance: 65,732
- TV announcers (CBS): Kevin Harlan and Rich Gannon

The Buccaneers were predicted by many as an underdog by several sports commentators to defeat the 3–1 Bengals, and they pulled off an upset win, with Bruce Gradkowski throwing 2 touchdowns, and Cadillac Williams running for 94 yards. With 34 seconds remaining in the 4th quarter, Gradkowkski threw a pass to wide receiver Michael Clayton, who appeared to cross the goal line in a dive, but dropped the football in the end zone. The pass was initially ruled incomplete. The replay official initiated a review, and referee Mike Carey determined that Clayton had possession of the football when he crossed the plain of the goal line. The call was reversed, and the Buccaneers were awarded the touchdown. At the end of regulation, Shayne Graham had a chance to win the game with a 62-yard field goal, but missed it wide right, giving the Buccaneers their first win of 2006.

=== Week 7: vs. Philadelphia Eagles ===
Quarter	1	2	3	4	Total
Eagles	0	0	7	14	21
Buccaneers	0	7	10	6	23

at Raymond James Stadium

- Game time: 1:00 PM EDT
- Game attendance: 65,808
- TV announcers (Fox): Brad Sham and Brian Baldinger

The Buccaneers entered week 7 against an Eagles team looking to build upon their 14–13 win over the Bengals. The Buccaneers defense stepped up big early, particularly Ronde Barber, who returned two Donovan McNabb interceptions for touchdowns. The Buccaneers however blew a 17-point lead when Brian Westbrook scored on a 52-yard touchdown with 33 seconds left. With two timeouts remaining, the Buccaneers drove to the Philadelphia 45-yard line with 4 seconds left. Kicker Matt Bryant then converted on an improbable, franchise record 62-yard field goal as time expired to give the Buccaneers a 23–21 victory. Ironically, the kick was the same distance Bengals' Shayne Graham missed from the previous week. The Buccaneers improved to 2–4. The kick was one yard short of the NFL record (63 yards) and the second-longest game-winning field goal in NFL history.

With an announced crowd of 65,808 the game stands as the highest-attended regular season Buccaneers game all-time at Raymond James Stadium.

=== Week 8: at New York Giants ===
Quarter	1	2	3	4	Total
Buccaneers	0	3	0	0	3
Giants	7	7	0	3	17

at Giants Stadium

- Game time: 1:00 PM EST
- Game attendance: 78,567
- TV announcers (Fox): Sam Rosen and Tim Ryan

Hoping to build on their dramatic home win over the Eagles, the Buccaneers flew to Giants Stadium for their Week 8 game with the New York Giants. Buccaneers cornerback Ronde Barber would be facing his brother, running back Tiki Barber for the last time in NFL competition as the latter planned to retire after the season. In the first quarter, Tampa Bay fell behind early, as quarterback Eli Manning completed a 7-yard touchdown pass to wide receiver Plaxico Burress for the only score of the period. In the second quarter, the Buccaneers' woes continued as Giants running back Brandon Jacobs got a 1-yard touchdown run. Kicker Matt Bryant would get Tampa Bay a 43-yard field goal, but that would all of the points that the Buccaneers would get, because after a scoreless third quarter, Giants kicker Jay Feely kicked a 31-yard field goal to put the game away. With their loss, the Buccaneers fell to 2–5.

=== Week 9: vs. New Orleans Saints ===
Quarter	1	2	3	4	Total
Saints	14	3	14	0	31
Buccaneers	0	14	0	0	14

at Raymond James Stadium

- Game time: 1:00 PM EST
- Game attendance: 65,561
- TV announcers (Fox): Dick Stockton and Daryl Johnston

Hoping to rebound from their road loss to the Giants, the Buccaneers went home for an NFC South rematch with the New Orleans Saints. In the first quarter, the Buccaneers trailed early as Saints quarterback Drew Brees completed a 15-yard touchdown pass to wide receiver Marques Colston and a 52-yard touchdown pass to wide receiver Devery Henderson. In the second quarter, kicker John Carney helped New Orleans improve its lead with a 46-yard field goal. Tampa Bay would valiantly fight back, as quarterback Bruce Gradkowski completed a 44-yard touchdown pass and a 17-yard touchdown pass to wide receiver Joey Galloway, but that would be as close as they would get. In the third quarter, Saints pulled away with running back Deuce McAllister completing a 3-yard touchdown run and Brees completing a 45-yard touchdown pass to Henderson. With a scoreless second half, the Buccaneers would fall to 2–6, and were swept by the Saints for the first time since 2002.

=== Week 10: at Carolina Panthers ===
Quarter	1	2	3	4	Total
Buccaneers	7	0	0	3	10
Panthers	0	0	17	7	24

at Bank of America Stadium

- Game time: 8:30 PM EST
- Game attendance: 73,573
- TV announcers (ESPN): Mike Tirico, Joe Theismann, and Tony Kornheiser

The Buccaneers travelled to Bank of America Stadium for an NFC South rematch on Monday Night Football with the Carolina Panthers. In the first quarter, quarterback Bruce Gradkowski completed a 6-yard touchdown pass to wide receiver Ike Hilliard for the only score of the period and the first half. However, in the third quarter, the Panthers struck back with a vengeance as kicker John Kasay nailed a 28-yard field goal, quarterback Jake Delhomme completing a 4-yard touchdown pass to wide receiver Keyshawn Johnson, and fullback Brad Hoover contributing a 5-yard touchdown run. In the fourth quarter, even though kicker Matt Bryant would nail a 28-yard field goal, Carolina managed to put the game away with Delhomme completing a 36-yard touchdown pass to wide receiver Steve Smith. With the loss, the Buccaneers fell to 2–7.

=== Week 11: vs. Washington Redskins ===
Quarter	1	2	3	4	Total
Redskins	3	0	7	7	17
Buccaneers	3	0	7	10	20

at Raymond James Stadium

- Game time: 1:00 PM EST
- Game attendance: 65,699
- TV announcers (Fox): Matt Devlin and Bill Maas

Hoping to rebound from their three-game losing streak, the Buccaneers went home for rematch of last season's NFC Wildcard match-up with the Washington Redskins. In the first quarter, the Buccaneers drew first blood with kicker Matt Bryant nailing a 26-yard field goal, while Redskins kicker Nick Novak got a 45-yard field goal. After a scoreless second quarter, Washington took the lead in the third quarter with quarterback Jason Campbell completing a 3-yard touchdown pass to tight end Chris Cooley. Tampa Bay would respond with quarterback Bruce Gradkowski completed a 2-yard touchdown pass to tight end Anthony Becht. In the fourth quarter, the Buccaneers managed to wrap-up the game with Gradkowski completing a 34-yard touchdown pass to wide receiver Joey Galloway, while Bryant kicked a 31-yard field goal. Even though the Redskins would get a 4-yard touchdown pass from Campbell to tight end Todd Yoder, the Buccaneers held on to win and advance to 3–7.

=== Week 12: at Dallas Cowboys ===
Quarter	1	2	3	4	Total
Buccaneers	7	3	0	0	10
Cowboys	7	14	14	3	38

at Texas Stadium

- Game time: 4:15 PM EST (Thursday)
- Game attendance: 63,183
- TV announcers (Fox): Joe Buck and Troy Aikman

Hoping to build on their home win over the Redskins, the Buccaneers flew to Texas Stadium for a Thanksgiving game against the Dallas Cowboys. In the first quarter, the Buccaneers capped off their opening drive with fullback Mike Alstott getting a 1-yard touchdown run. However, the Cowboys responded with quarterback Tony Romo getting a 30-yard touchdown pass to wide receiver Terry Glenn. In the second quarter, Romo and Glenn hooked up with each other again on a 2-yard touchdown pass. The Buccaneers could only respond with kicker Matt Bryant getting a 46-yard field goal. Dallas would respond with Romo getting a 1-yard touchdown pass to running back Marion Barber. In the third quarter, Romo and Barber would hook up with each other again on a 2-yard touchdown pass, with Romo also hooking up with wide receiver Terrell Owens on a 7-yard touchdown pass. In the fourth quarter, kicker Mike Vanderjagt would close out the scoring with a 22-yard field goal. With the loss, the Buccaneers fell to 3–8.

=== Week 13: at Pittsburgh Steelers ===
Quarter	1	2	3	4	Total
Buccaneers	0	0	0	3	3
Steelers	7	3	0	10	20

at Heinz Field

- Game time: 4:15 PM EST
- Game attendance: 59,843
- TV announcers (Fox): Ron Pitts and Jesse Palmer

Bruce Gradkowski's homecoming was also his worst game of the season. In the first quarter, Ben Roethlisberger threw his only interception early in the game to linebacker Derrick Brooks. Later in the quarter, Gradkowski tossed his first interception to Steeler linebacker Larry Foote. In the final seconds of the first quarter, Roethlisberger threw a short touchdown pass to tight end Jerame Tuman. Later in the second half, Gradkowski tossed another interception in the red zone to Bryant McFadden. Steelers kicker Jeff Reed, kicked a 50-yard field goal to end the first half. After another interception of Gradkowski in the second half, Roethlisberger completed a touchdown pass in the early fourth quarter. By the two-minute warning, the score was 20–0, in the favor of the Steelers. Tampa Bay kicker Matt Bryant, made sure the Buccaneers did not get shut out with a 27-yard field goal in the last seconds of regulation.

=== Week 14: vs. Atlanta Falcons ===
Quarter	1	2	3	4	Total
Falcons	0	0	14	3	17
Buccaneers	3	3	0	0	6

at Raymond James Stadium

- Game time: 1:00 PM EST
- Game attendance: 65,691
- TV announcers (Fox): Dick Stockton and Daryl Johnston

Trying to snap a two-game losing skid, the Buccaneers went home for an NFC South rematch with the Atlanta Falcons. In the first half, the Buccaneers jumped out to an early lead as kicker Matt Bryant got a 42-yard field goal in the first quarter, while nailing a 24-yard field goal in the second quarter. However, for the rest of the game, it was all Atlanta. In the third quarter, the Falcons took the lead with outside linebacker Demorrio Williams returning a fumble 54 yards for a touchdown, while fullback Justin Griffith got a 21-yard touchdown run. In the fourth quarter, Atlanta wrapped up their season sweep over Tampa Bay with kicker Morten Andersen nailing a 23-yard field goal. With the loss, the Buccaneers fell to 3–10.

=== Week 15: at Chicago Bears ===
Quarter	1	2	3	4	OT	Total
Buccaneers	0	3	7	21	0	31
Bears	7	14	3	7	3	34

at Soldier Field

- Game time: 1:00 PM EST
- Game attendance: 62,260
- TV announcers (Fox): Dick Stockton and Daryl Johnston

The Bears entered week 15 of the NFL season hoping to secure a first-round bye and home-field advantage throughout the NFC playoffs. Chicago led 24–3 with 5:22 left in the third quarter and were en route to winning their third straight. During the first quarter, the Buccaneers had only reached 80 yards in total offense. Head coach Jon Gruden sent in back-up Tim Rattay, who completed 20 of 35 for 268 yards with 3 touchdowns and one interception as the Buccaneers battled back to tie the game up at 31 during the fourth quarter. A controversial move was made by Chicago Bears' head coach Lovie Smith as he decided to let time expire during the fourth quarter and thus send the game into overtime. Tampa Bay won the coin toss, and both teams had three possessions in overtime. After missing earlier in the overtime period, Robbie Gould connected on a 27-yard field goal with 3:37 remaining to give the Bears the victory, 34–31. This loss sent the struggling Buccaneers to 3–11 which secured last place in the NFC South standings.

=== Week 16: at Cleveland Browns ===
Quarter	1	2	3	4	Total
Buccaneers	3	3	6	10	22
Browns	0	0	0	7	7

at Cleveland Browns Stadium

- Game time: 1:00 PM EST
- Game attendance: 69,603
- TV announcers (Fox): Matt Vasgersian and J.C. Pearson

Trying to end a four-game losing skid, the Buccaneers flew to Cleveland Browns Stadium for a Week 16 interconference fight with the Cleveland Browns on Christmas Eve. In the first half, the Buccaneers got off to a decent start with kicker Matt Bryant nailing a 23-yard field goal in the first quarter and a 24-yard field goal in the second quarter. In the third quarter, Tampa Bay increased its lead with running back Michael Pittman's 11-yard touchdown run (following extra point was blocked). In the fourth quarter, the Buccaneers defense got a chance to score with outside linebacker Derrick Brooks returning an interception 21 yards for a touchdown. Afterwards, the Browns would get their only score of the game as cornerback Daven Holly returned a fumble 40 yards for a touchdown. After that, the Buccaneers wrapped the game up with Bryant's 37-yard field goal. With the win, the Buccaneers improved to 4–11.

=== Week 17: vs. Seattle Seahawks ===
Quarter	1	2	3	4	Total
Seahawks	10	7	3	3	23
Buccaneers	0	7	0	0	7

at Raymond James Stadium

- Game time: 1:00 PM EST
- Game attendance: 65,660
- TV announcers (Fox): Matt Vasgersian and J.C. Pearson

Trying to end their season on a high note on New Year's Eve, the Buccaneers hosted the NFC West champion Seattle Seahawks. Tampa Bay trailed early as Seahawks kicker Josh Brown nailed a 35-yard field goal, which was followed by running back Shaun Alexander's one-yard touchdown run. In the second quarter, the Buccaneers got their only score of the game with quarterback Tim Rattay completing a 4-yard touchdown pass to wide receiver Joey Galloway. Afterwards, Seattle continued its dominance with quarterback Matt Hasselbeck completing a 5-yard touchdown pass to wide receiver D.J. Hackett. After that, the Seahawks wrapped up the game in the second half with Brown getting a 30-yard field goal in the third quarter and a 23-yard field goal in the fourth quarter. With the loss, the Buccaneers ended their year at 4–12.
