= 2006 New Orleans Saints season =

NFL team season

- Owner: Tom Benson
- General manager: Mickey Loomis
- Head coach: Sean Payton
- Offensive coordinator: Doug Marrone
- Defensive coordinator: Gary Gibbs
- Home stadium: Louisiana Superdome

Results
- Record: 10–6
- Division place: 1st NFC South
- Playoffs: Won Divisional Playoffs (vs. Eagles) 27–24; Lost NFC Championship (at Bears) 14–39
- All-Pros: QB Drew Brees (1st team); OT Jammal Brown (1st team); FB Mike Karney (2nd team)
- Pro Bowlers: QB Drew Brees; OT Jammal Brown; DE Will Smith

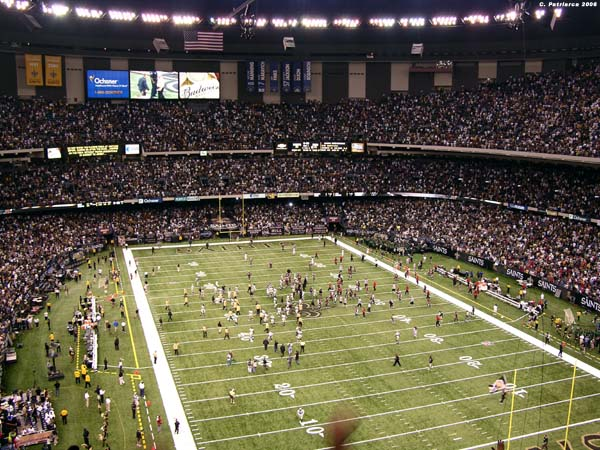
The Louisiana Superdome during the Saints' win over the Philadelphia Eagles, October 15, 2006

The 2006 season was the New Orleans Saints' 40th in the National Football League (NFL).

The season began with the team returning to New Orleans after a year in exile from the city, and trying to improve on their 3–13 record in 2005. All of the team's 2006 regular season home games were played in the Louisiana Superdome, which had been unplayable for the entire 2005 season after being damaged during Hurricane Katrina. Led by a new coach, Sean Payton, and a new quarterback, Drew Brees, the Saints enjoyed their most successful season up to that time, reaching the playoffs for the first time since 2000 and the NFC Championship Game for the first time in franchise history.

After a poor season for Aaron Brooks, he was released and eventually signed with the Oakland Raiders. This called for Brees to take his place, and he would play for the Saints until his retirement after the 2020 season.

== Offseason ==
On January 17, the Saints made their first step in the 2006 offseason by hiring Sean Payton, the former assistant head coach for the Dallas Cowboys, as their new head coach.

On March 14, 2006, the Saints signed former Chargers quarterback Drew Brees, a free agent, to a six-year deal.

=== Return to New Orleans ===
The NFL announced on February 5, 2006, that the Superdome would reopen on September 24 when the Saints hosted the Atlanta Falcons.

Sites for the team's 2006 preseason games were announced on March 23. They were Shreveport, Louisiana, for an August 21 game against the Dallas Cowboys, and Jackson, Mississippi, for an August 26 game against the Indianapolis Colts.

On April 6 the Saints released their 2006 schedule. All home games were scheduled to be played at the Superdome. The home opener against the Atlanta Falcons was moved from September 24 to September 25 and was shown on ESPN's Monday Night Football.

=== NFL draft ===
In the 2006 NFL Draft, the Saints used their first, and the second overall, pick on USC running back Reggie Bush, who had won the 2005 Heisman Trophy. Bush was passed over by the Houston Texans, who instead selected North Carolina State defensive end Mario Williams with the first overall pick.

2006 New Orleans Saints draft
Round	Pick	Player	Position	College	Notes
1	2	Reggie Bush	Running back	USC	
2	43	Roman Harper *	Safety	Alabama	
4	108	Jahri Evans *	Guard	Bloomsburg	
5	135	Rob Ninkovich	Defensive end	Purdue	
6	171	Mike Hass	Wide receiver	Oregon State	
6	174	Josh Lay	Cornerback	Pittsburgh	
7	210	Zach Strief	Guard	Northwestern	
7	252	Marques Colston	Wide receiver	Hofstra	
Made roster * Made at least one Pro Bowl during career

== Personnel ==
=== Staff ===
2006 New Orleans Saints staff
Front office: Owner/president – Tom Benson; Owner/executive vice president – Rita Benson LeBlanc; Executive vice president/general manager – Mickey Loomis; Vice president of football administration – Russ Ball; Vice president of player personnel – Rick Mueller; Director of college scouting – Rick Reiprish; College scouting coordinator – Rick Thompson; Head coaches: Head coach – Sean Payton; Assistant head coach/linebackers – Joe Vitt; Offensive coaches: Offensive coordinator/offensive line – Doug Marrone; Quarterbacks – Pete Carmichael, Jr.; Senior offensive assistant/running backs – George Henshaw; Wide receivers – Curtis Johnson; Tight ends – Terry Malone; Offensive assistant/passing game – John Morton	Defensive coaches: Defensive coordinator – Gary Gibbs; Defensive line – Marion Hobby; Assistant defensive line/defensive assistant – Dennis Allen; Defensive backs – Tom Hayes; Defensive assistant/secondary – Tony Oden; Defensive Assistant – Joe Alley; Special teams coaches: Special teams coordinator – John Bonamego; Assistant special teams – Greg McMahon; Strength and conditioning: Head strength and conditioning – Dan Dalrymple; Assistant strength and conditioning – Adam Bailey

=== Roster ===
2006 New Orleans Saints roster
Quarterbacks (QB): 9 Drew Brees; 10 Jamie Martin; Running backs (RB): 25 Reggie Bush; 26 Deuce McAllister; 27 Aaron Stecker; 30 Fred McAfee; 35 Jamaal Branch; 44 Mike Karney FB; Wide receivers (WR): 12 Marques Colston; 18 Terrance Copper; 19 Devery Henderson; 84 Michael Lewis; 87 Joe Horn; 89 Jamal Jones; Tight ends (TE): 80 Mark Campbell; 83 Billy Miller; 86 John Owens	Offensive linemen (OL): 52 Jeff Faine C; 61 Montrae Holland G; 64 Zach Strief T; 67 Jamar Nesbit G; 70 Jammal Brown T; 73 Jahri Evans G; 76 Jonathan Goodwin C; 78 Jon Stinchcomb T; 79 Rob Petitti T; Defensive linemen (DL): 66 Brian Young DT; 77 Rodney Leisle DT; 91 Will Smith DE; 94 Charles Grant DE; 95 Trevor Johnson DE; 96 Antwan Lake DE; 97 Josh Cooper DE; 98 Willie Whitehead DE	Linebackers (LB): 51 Terrence Melton OLB; 53 Mark Simoneau ILB; 54 Danny Clark OLB; 55 Scott Fujita OLB; 56 Alfred Fincher OLB; 58 Scott Shanle OLB; Defensive backs (DB): 20 Jay Bellamy FS; 21 Jason Craft CB; 22 Fred Thomas CB; 23 Omar Stoutmire FS; 24 Bryan Scott SS; 28 DeJuan Groce CB; 29 Josh Bullocks FS; 34 Mike McKenzie CB; 37 Steve Gleason SS; 39 Curtis Deloatch CB; Special teams (ST): 3 John Carney K; 7 Steve Weatherford P; 47 Kevin Houser LS	Practice squad: 60 Ben Archibald G; 11 Jason Fife QB; 82 Robert Johnson TE; 62 E.J. Kuale LB (IR); 16 Lance Moore WR; 36 Anwar Phillips CB; 88 Dante Ridgeway WR; 68 John Syptak DE; 90 Brandon Villarreal DT; Reserve: 50 James Allenn LB (IR); 17 Mitch Berger P (IR); 85 Ernie Conwell TE (IR); 41 Roman Harper S (IR); 74 Augie Hoffmann G (IR); 33 Keith Joseph RB (IR); 93 Rob Ninkovich DE (IR); -- Tommy Polley LB (IR); 63 Chad Setterstrom G (IR); 99 Hollis Thomas DT (Susp.); Rookies in italics 53 active, 11 reserve, 8 practice squad

== 2006 Unofficial active depth chart ==
=== Offense ===
WR	Marques Colston 12	Devery Henderson 19	Terrance Copper 18
LT	Jammal Brown 70	Rob Petitti 79	
LG	Jamar Nesbit 67	Montrae Holland 61	
C	Jeff Faine 52	Jonathan Goodwin 76	
RG	Jahri Evans 73	Montrae Holland 61	
RT	Jon Stinchcomb 78	Zach Strief 64	
TE	Ernie Conwell 85	Mark Campbell 80	Nate Lawrie 82
WR	Joe Horn 87	Jamal Jones 89	Lance Moore 16
QB	Drew Brees 9	Jamie Martin 10	Jason Fife 11
RB	Deuce McAllister 26	Reggie Bush 25	Aaron Stecker 27
FB	Mike Karney 44	Corey McIntyre 36	

=== Defense ===
LDE	Charles Grant 94	Eric Moore 95	
NT	Hollis Thomas 99	Antwan Lake 96	Rodney Leisle 77
DT	Brian Young 66	Willie Whitehead 98	
RDE	Will Smith 91	Eric Moore 95	
SLB	Scott Fujita 55	Alfred Fincher 56	
MLB	Mark Simoneau 53	Danny Clark 54	
WLB	Scott Shanle 58	Terrence Melton 51	
LCB	Mike McKenzie 34	DeJuan Groce 28	Curtis Deloatch 39
SS	Omar Stoutmire 23	Steve Gleason 37	Jay Bellamy 20
FS	Josh Bullocks 29	Bryan Scott 24	Jay Bellamy 20
RCB	Fred Thomas 22	Jason Craft 21	

=== Special teams ===
LS	Kevin Houser 47		
P	Steve Weatherford 7		
H	Jamie Martin 10		
K	John Carney 3		
KO	Billy Cundiff		
PR	Michael Lewis 84	Reggie Bush 25	
KR	Michael Lewis 84	Terrance Copper 18	Aaron Stecker 27

== Preseason ==
=== Schedule ===
Week	Date	Opponent	Result	Record	Venue	Recap
1	August 12	at Tennessee Titans	W 19–16	1–0	LP Field	Recap
2	August 21	Dallas Cowboys	L 7–30	1–1	Independence Stadium	Recap
3	August 26	Indianapolis Colts	L 14–27	1–2	Mississippi Veterans Memorial Stadium	Recap
4	August 31	at Kansas City Chiefs	L 9–10	1–3	Arrowhead Stadium	Recap

== Regular season ==
=== Schedule ===
Week	Date	Opponent	Result	Record	Venue	Recap
1	September 10	at Cleveland Browns	W 19–14	1–0	Cleveland Browns Stadium	Recap
2	September 17	at Green Bay Packers	W 34–27	2–0	Lambeau Field	Recap
3	September 25	Atlanta Falcons	W 23–3	3–0	Louisiana Superdome	Recap
4	October 1	at Carolina Panthers	L 18–21	3–1	Bank of America Stadium	Recap
5	October 8	Tampa Bay Buccaneers	W 24–21	4–1	Louisiana Superdome	Recap
6	October 15	Philadelphia Eagles	W 27–24	5–1	Louisiana Superdome	Recap
7	Bye					
8	October 29	Baltimore Ravens	L 22–35	5–2	Louisiana Superdome	Recap
9	November 5	at Tampa Bay Buccaneers	W 31–14	6–2	Raymond James Stadium	Recap
10	November 12	at Pittsburgh Steelers	L 31–38	6–3	Heinz Field	Recap
11	November 19	Cincinnati Bengals	L 16–31	6–4	Louisiana Superdome	Recap
12	November 26	at Atlanta Falcons	W 31–13	7–4	Georgia Dome	Recap
13	December 3	San Francisco 49ers	W 34–10	8–4	Louisiana Superdome	Recap
14	December 10	at Dallas Cowboys	W 42–17	9–4	Texas Stadium	Recap
15	December 17	Washington Redskins	L 10–16	9–5	Louisiana Superdome	Recap
16	December 24	at New York Giants	W 30–7	10–5	Giants Stadium	Recap
17	December 31	Carolina Panthers	L 21–31	10–6	Louisiana Superdome	Recap

== Standings ==
NFC South
	W	L	T	PCT	DIV	CONF	PF	PA	STK
^{(2)} New Orleans Saints	10	6	0	.625	4–2	9–3	413	322	L1
Carolina Panthers	8	8	0	.500	5–1	6–6	270	305	W2
Atlanta Falcons	7	9	0	.438	3–3	5–7	292	328	L3
Tampa Bay Buccaneers	4	12	0	.250	0–6	2–10	211	353	L1

== Regular season ==
=== Week 1: at Cleveland Browns ===
Quarter	1	2	3	4	Total
Saints	3	6	7	3	19
Browns	0	0	7	7	14

at Cleveland Browns Stadium, Cleveland, Ohio

- Game time: 1:00 pm EDT/12:00 pm CDT
- Game weather: 68 °F (20 °C), relative humidity 75%, wind 8 miles per hour (13 km/h; 7.0 kn)
- Game attendance: 72,915
- Referee: Jerome Boger
- TV announcers (Fox): Ron Pitts and Terry Donahue
- Pro-Football-Reference.com

Game information

First quarter

- NO – John Carney 43-yard field goal – Saints 3–0

Second quarter

- NO – John Carney 25-yard field goal – Saints 6–0
- NO – John Carney 21-yard field goal – Saints 9–0

Third quarter

- CLE – Kellen Winslow 18-yard pass from Charlie Frye (Phil Dawson kick) – Saints 9–7
- NO – Marques Colston 12-yard pass from Drew Brees (John Carney kick) – Saints 16–7

Fourth quarter

- CLE – Charlie Frye 1-yard run (Phil Dawson kick) – Saints 16–14
- NO – John Carney 20-yard field goal – Saints 19–14

Saints

- Drew Brees
  16/30, 170 Yds, touchdown, INT
- Deuce McAllister
  22 Rush, 90 Yds
- Reggie Bush
  7 Rec, 52 Yds

Browns

- Charlie Frye
  16/27, 132 Yds, touchdown, 2 INT
  6 Rush, 44 Yds, touchdown
- Kellen Winslow
  8 Rec, 63 Yds, touchdown

The Saints opened the regular season on the road against the Cleveland Browns on September 10. In the first half, kicker John Carney provided all of the Saints' first 9 points. He put up a 43-yarder in the first, along with a 25 and a 21-yarder in the second quarter. In the third quarter, the Browns offense finally got going as Cleveland quarterback Charlie Frye hooked up with TE Kellen Winslow on an 18-yard touchdown pass. The Saints responded with a 12-yard touchdown pass from quarterback Drew Brees to WR Marques Colston. In the fourth quarter, the Browns came close with Frye getting a 1-yard touchdown run. However, the Saints put the game away with Carney kicking a 20-yard FG to give the Saints the win.

Despite not scoring a touchdown, RB Reggie Bush had a sound NFL debut, as he ran 14 times for 61 yards, caught 8 passes for 58 yards, and returned three punts for 22 yards. In total, he piled up 141 all-purpose yards.

=== Week 2: at Green Bay Packers ===
Quarter	1	2	3	4	Total
Saints	0	14	6	14	34
Packers	13	0	0	14	27

at Lambeau Field

- Game time: 1:00 pm EDT/12:00 pm CDT
- Game weather: 78 °F (25.6 °C), relative humidity 59%, wind 12 miles per hour (19 km/h; 10 kn)
- Game attendance: 70,602
- Referee: Pete Morelli
- TV announcers (Fox): Ron Pitts and Terry Donahue

For Week 2, the Saints traveled to take on the Packers at Green Bay's Lambeau Field, where in the preceding season they lost 52–3. The Saints trailed in the first quarter, on a 22-yard touchdown pass to opposing WR Greg Jennings and two Dave Rayner field goals – a 24-yarder and a 36-yarder. The Saints began their scoring in the second quarter, as RB Deuce McAllister got a 3-yard touchdown run and quarterback Drew Brees threw a 26-yard touchdown strike to WR Devery Henderson. In the third quarter, the punishing continued, as kicker John Carney kicked a 45 and a 47-yard field goal to further New Orleans' lead. In the fourth quarter, Green Bay tried to come back with quarterback Brett Favre throwing a 4-yard pass to WR Robert Ferguson. The Saints managed to put the game away with a 25-yard touchdown pass to WR Marques Colston and a 23-yard run by McAllister. The Packers scored once more, on a 6-yard touchdown pass to RB Noah Herron, but the damage was done.

=== Week 3: vs. Atlanta Falcons ===
Quarter	1	2	3	4	Total
Falcons	3	0	0	0	3
Saints	14	6	3	0	23

at Louisiana Superdome

- Date: September 25
- Game time: 8:30 pm EDT/7:30 pm CDT
- Game weather: Indoors (Domed stadium)
- Game attendance: 70,003
- Referee: Ed Hochuli
- TV announcers (ESPN): Mike Tirico, Joe Theismann, Tony Kornheiser, Suzy Kolber, and Michele Tafoya

Game information

First quarter

- NO – Curtis Deloatch 0-yard blocked punt return (John Carney kick), 13:30. Saints 7–0.
- ATL – Morten Andersen 26-yard field goal, 9:41. Saints 7–3. Drive: 9 plays, 65 yards, 3:49.
- NO – Devery Henderson 11-yard run (John Carney kick), 2:54. Saints 14–3. Drive: 8 plays, 52 yards, 4:05.

Second quarter

- NO – John Carney 37-yard field goal, 6:44. Saints 17–3. Drive: 10 plays, 71 yards, 5:05.
- NO – John Carney 51-yard field goal, 0:00. Saints 20–3. Drive: 10 plays, 53 yards, 1:49.

Third quarter

- NO – John Carney 20-yard field goal, 7:14. Saints 23–3. Drive: 12 plays, 73 yards, 7:46.

Fourth quarter

- No scoring plays

Top passers

- ATL – Michael Vick – 12/31, 137 yards
- NO – Drew Brees – 20/28, 191 yards

Top rushers

- ATL – Michael Vick – 6 rushes, 57 yards
- NO – Deuce McAllister – 13 rushes, 81 yards

Top receivers

- ATL – Alge Crumpler – 5 receptions, 49 yards
- NO – Marques Colston – 7 receptions, 97 yards

Riding high from their two-straight road wins, the Saints returned home to the Louisiana Superdome for the first time since December 26, 2004 for a special Monday Night game against their fellow NFC South division rival, the Atlanta Falcons, in front of a jubilant sold-out crowd of 70,003 and ESPN's largest-ever audience, with about 10.8 million households viewing, at the time the second-largest cable audience in history. (Note: Behind the 1993 North American Free Trade Agreement (NAFTA) debate between Al Gore and Ross Perot on CNN.)

On just the fourth overall play of the game, safety Steve Gleason blocked a punt and DB Curtis Deloatch managed to land on the ball in the end zone for the Saints first score of the game. (Note: At this point, the game paused to allow the cameras to show the crowd cheering for a few minutes.) Former Saints kicker Morten Andersen helped Atlanta get its only score of the game, from a 26-yard field goal. From there, the Saints dominated the rest of the game. For the final score of the first quarter, WR Devery Henderson ran 11 yards for a touchdown on a reverse. Kicker John Carney provided the scoring for the rest of the game, as he kicked two-second-quarter field goals (a 37-yarder and a 51-yarder), and one third-quarter field goal (a 20-yarder) to essentially wrap up the game. From there, the Saints defense continued to put pressure on Falcons quarterback Michael Vick, as they sacked him five times, while limiting the running duo of Vick and Dunn to just a combined total of 101 rushing yards. With their dominating performance, the Saints took the lead in the NFC South with a 3–0 record.

Green Day and U2 performed jointly on the field before the game, while the Goo Goo Dolls held a concert outside the Dome earlier in the evening. Former President George H. W. Bush, who won the Republican nod for the presidency in the Superdome back in 1988, was part of the coin toss ceremony.

=== Week 4: at Carolina Panthers ===
Quarter	1	2	3	4	Total
Saints	0	3	0	15	18
Panthers	7	0	0	14	21

at Bank of America Stadium

- Game time: 1:00 pm EDT/12:00 pm CDT
- Game weather: 82 °F (27.8 °C), relative humidity 40%, wind 6 miles per hour (9.7 km/h; 5.2 kn)
- Game attendance: 73,392
- Referee: Walt Coleman
- TV announcers (Fox): Joe Buck, Troy Aikman, and Pam Oliver

Following their dominant home game at the Louisiana Superdome, the Saints traveled to Bank of America Stadium for an NFC South battle with the Carolina Panthers. From the get-go, the Saints trailed early, as quarterback Jake Delhomme completed a 9-yard touchdown pass to WR Steve Smith for the only score of the period. In the second quarter, the Saints managed to get a field goal, as kicker John Carney nailed one from 31 yards out. After a scoreless third quarter, RB Deuce McAllister managed to help New Orleans take the lead, as he got a 3-yard touchdown run. That was the only time that the Saints saw the lead, as the Panthers slashed away, with Delhomme completing a 4-yard pass to WR Drew Carter and RB DeShaun Foster running 43 yards for a touchdown. New Orleans tried to come back, as quarterback Drew Brees completed an 86-yard touchdown pass to WR Marques Colston, but that was as close as they got, as Carolina held on to win, while the Saints got their first loss of the year dropping to 3–1.

=== Week 5: vs. Tampa Bay Buccaneers ===
Quarter	1	2	3	4	Total
Buccaneers	7	0	7	7	21
Saints	3	7	7	7	24

at Louisiana Superdome

- Game time: 1:00 pm EDT/12:00 pm CDT
- Game weather: Indoors (Domed stadium)
- Game attendance: 68,183
- Referee: Gene Steratore
- TV announcers (Fox): Ron Pitts and J.C. Pearson

The second game back in the Superdome was not marked by the media attention of the Saints' home opener, but fans in attendance were not disappointed. The sold-out crowd was treated to a dramatic contest between the Saints and the Tampa Bay Buccaneers. Though Tampa Bay proved to be a formidable opponent despite their season-long losing streak, the Saints won 24–21. The win was capped off by a fourth quarter punt return by Saints rookie Reggie Bush. Prior to the play, Bush roused the notoriously raucous New Orleans audience to their feet; by the time the ball was snapped, the cheers had reached a tremendous level. The noise only increased as Bush raced past the Bucs' special teams for 65 yards and scored the game-winning touchdown, his first as an NFL player. After the game, the traditional "Who Dat?" cheer was punctuated by spontaneous chants of "Reggie, Reggie" as the Saints claimed their fourth win of the season while improving to 4–1.

=== Week 6: vs. Philadelphia Eagles ===
Quarter	1	2	3	4	Total
Eagles	0	3	14	7	24
Saints	10	7	0	10	27

at Louisiana Superdome

- Game time: 1:00 pm EDT/12:00 pm CDT
- Game weather: Indoors (Domed stadium)
- Game attendance: 68,269
- Referee: Bill Vinovich
- TV announcers (Fox): Dick Stockton, Troy Aikman, and Pam Oliver

Hoping to build on their win over Tampa Bay, the Saints stayed at home for a Week 6 fight with the Philadelphia Eagles. In the first quarter, New Orleans jumped out to an early lead with kicker John Carney kicking a 39-yard field goal and quarterback Drew Brees completing a 14-yard touchdown pass to WR Joe Horn. In the second quarter, Philadelphia got on the board with a 47-yard field goal by David Akers. The Saints managed to further themselves, as Brees completed a 7-yard touchdown pass to WR Marques Colston. However, in the third quarter, the Eagles started to get back into the game, as quarterback Donovan McNabb completed two touchdown passes – a 60-yarder to WR Reggie Brown and a 4-yard to TE L.J. Smith. In the fourth quarter, Philadelphia took the lead on a 15-yard touchdown run by Brown. After Brees completed a 48-yard touchdown pass to Horn, Carney helped give New Orleans the win as he kicked a 31-yard field goal as time ran out on the game. With the win, the Saints maintained their lead in the NFC South with a 5–1 record going into their bye week.

=== Week 8: vs. Baltimore Ravens ===
Quarter	1	2	3	4	Total
Ravens	7	21	7	0	35
Saints	0	7	0	15	22

at Louisiana Superdome

- Game time: 1:00 pm EST/12:00 pm CST
- Game weather: Indoors (Domed stadium)
- Game attendance: 69,152
- Referee: Jerome Boger
- TV announcers (CBS): Dick Enberg and Randy Cross

Coming off their bye week, the Saints stayed at home for their Week 8 fight with the visiting Baltimore Ravens. From the get-go, New Orleans trailed as quarterback Steve McNair got a 5-yard touchdown run for the only score of the quarter. In the second quarter, things only got worse for the Saints, as McNair completed a 4-yard touchdown pass to WR Clarence Moore, while rookie DB Ronnie Prude returned an interception 12 yards for a touchdown. New Orleans got on the board, as quarterback Drew Brees completed a 32-yard touchdown pass to WR Joe Horn, yet Baltimore increased their lead with McNair completing a 6-yard touchdown pass to TE Todd Heap. In the third quarter, the Ravens got another 12-yard touchdown interception return with rookie Strong Safety Dawan Landry making the pick for the only score of the period. In the fourth quarter, the Saints tried to mount a comeback, as Brees completed a 47-yard touchdown pass and a 25-yard touchdown pass to rookie WR Marques Colston. However, the Saints comeback drive ended there, as New Orleans fell to 5–2.

=== Week 9: at Tampa Bay Buccaneers ===
Quarter	1	2	3	4	Total
Saints	14	3	14	0	31
Buccaneers	0	14	0	0	14

at Raymond James Stadium

- Game time: 1:00 pm EST/12:00 pm CST
- Game weather: 81 °F (27.2 °C), clear skies
- Game attendance: 65,561
- Referee: Bill Leavy
- TV announcers (Fox): Dick Stockton, Daryl Johnston, and Tony Siragusa

Hoping to rebound from their home loss to the Ravens, the Saints flew to Raymond James Stadium for an NFC South rematch with the Tampa Bay Buccaneers. In the first quarter, quarterback Drew Brees completed a 15-yard touchdown pass to rookie WR Marques Colston and a 52-yard touchdown pass to WR Devery Henderson. In the second quarter, kicker John Carney made a 46-yard field goal to give New Orleans a 17–0 lead. Yet, the Bucs started to fight back, as quarterback Bruce Gradkowski completed two touchdown passes to WR Joey Galloway – a 44-yarder and a 17-yarder. In the third quarter, the Saints took over, as RB Deuce McAllister completed a 3-yard touchdown run, while Brees completed a 45-yard touchdown pass to Henderson. After a scoreless fourth quarter, New Orleans got the sweep over Tampa Bay and improved to 6–2.

=== Week 10: at Pittsburgh Steelers ===
Quarter	1	2	3	4	Total
Saints	7	17	0	7	31
Steelers	14	3	7	14	38

at Heinz Field

- Game time: 4:15 pm EST/3:15 pm CST
- Game weather: 39 °F (3.9 °C), relative humidity 75%, wind 9 miles per hour (14 km/h; 7.8 kn)
- Game attendance: 61,911
- Referee: Bill Carollo
- TV announcers (Fox): Joe Buck, Troy Aikman, and Pam Oliver

Coming off their sweeping win over the Bucs, the Saints flew to Heinz Field for a match-up with the defending Super Bowl champion Pittsburgh Steelers. In the first quarter, the Saints trailed early as quarterback Ben Roethlisberger completed a 37-yard touchdown pass to WR Hines Ward and a 2-yard touchdown pass to TE Heath Miller. Afterwards, New Orleans got on the board with quarterback Drew Brees completing a 3-yard touchdown pass to WR Terrance Copper. In the second quarter, the Saints started to take command as kicker John Carney completed a 20-yard field goal, while rookie RB Reggie Bush got a 15-yard touchdown run on a reverse. Pittsburgh got a 32-yard field goal from kicker Jeff Reed, but New Orleans responded with RB Deuce McAllister getting a 4-yard touchdown run. In the third quarter, the Steelers started to fight back as Roethlisberger completed a 38-yard touchdown pass to WR Cedrick Wilson for the only score of the period. In the fourth quarter, RB Willie Parker followed up two 70+ yard runs with a 3-yard and a 4-yard touchdown run to give Pittsburgh the lead. The Saints tried to fight back with McAllister getting a 4-yard touchdown run, but Pittsburgh held on to win. With the loss, the Saints fell to 6–3.

=== Week 11: vs. Cincinnati Bengals ===
Quarter	1	2	3	4	Total
Bengals	7	3	0	21	31
Saints	7	0	0	9	16

at Louisiana Superdome

- Game time: 1:00 pm EDT/12:00 pm CDT
- Game weather: Indoors (Domed stadium)
- Game attendance: 68,001
- Referee: Tony Corrente
- TV announcers (CBS): Dick Enberg and Randy Cross

Coming off a road loss to the Steelers, the Saints went home for an interconference fight with the Cincinnati Bengals. In the first quarter, Cincinnati struck first with quarterback Carson Palmer completing a 41-yard touchdown pass to WR Chad Johnson. Afterwards, New Orleans responded with quarterback Drew Brees completing a 72-yard touchdown pass to WR Joe Horn. In the second quarter, the Bengals took the lead with kicker Shayne Graham getting a 21-yard field goal for the only score of the period. After a scoreless third quarter, kicker John Carney began the fourth quarter with 24-yard field goal. However, things went downhill with Cincinnati's most dominant part of the game. Palmer completed a 60-yard touchdown pass and a 4-yard touchdown pass to Chad, while rookie DB Ethan Kilmer returned an interception 52 yards for a touchdown. Afterwards, New Orleans could only muster a 27-yard touchdown pass from Brees to WR Terrance Copper. With the loss, the Saints fell to 6–4.

=== Week 12: at Atlanta Falcons ===
Quarter	1	2	3	4	Total
Saints	14	7	0	10	31
Falcons	3	3	7	0	13

at Georgia Dome

- Game time: 1:00 pm EDT/12:00 pm CDT
- Game weather: Indoors (Domed stadium)
- Game attendance: 70,933
- Referee: Scott Green
- TV announcers (Fox): Dick Stockton, Daryl Johnston, and Tony Siragusa

Trying to snap a two-game skid, the Saints flew to the Georgia Dome for an NFC South rematch with the Atlanta Falcons. In the first quarter, New Orleans started off strong with quarterback Drew Brees completing a 76-yard touchdown pass to WR Devery Henderson, while RB Deuce McAllister got a 1-yard touchdown run. Afterwards, Falcons kicker Morten Andersen completed a 22-yard field goal for Atlanta. In the second quarter, Andersen made a 30-yard field goal, while on the final play of the half, Brees threw a spectacular 48-yard "Hail Mary" touchdown pass to WR Terrance Copper. In the third quarter, Atlanta tried to fight back, as RB Warrick Dunn got a 1-yard touchdown run for the only score of the quarter. In the fourth quarter, New Orleans managed to put the game away with kicker John Carney completing a 25-yard field goal and McAllister getting a 9-yard touchdown run. With the season sweep over the Falcons, the Saints improved to 7–4.

=== Week 13: vs. San Francisco 49ers ===
Quarter	1	2	3	4	Total
49ers	3	0	7	0	10
Saints	0	14	10	10	34

at Louisiana Superdome

- Game time: 1:00 pm EDT/12:00 pm CDT
- Game weather: Indoors (Domed stadium)
- Game attendance: 68,241
- Referee: Mike Carey
- TV announcers (Fox): Kenny Albert and Bill Maas

Attempting to capitalize on their decisive victory at Atlanta, a revitalized Saints team entered the game with high hopes. In the first quarter, 49ers kicker Joe Nedney kicked a 29-yarder for the 49ers only score of the half. Reggie Bush exploded in the second quarter with a 1-yard run touchdown and, after an interception returned to the 7-yard line by Mike McKenzie, a sneak-around touchdown late in the quarter. Coming into the third quarter, Alex Smith completed a 48-yard touchdown pass to Antonio Bryant, but that was the final score for the 49ers. After a John Carney field goal, Reggie Bush took hold of a five-yard shovel pass from Drew Brees and scored his third touchdown of the night. In the fourth quarter, Bush ran down the sidelines and appeared to be heading for a fourth touchdown after a quick pass that he turned into a 74-yarder, but he fumbled the ball out of bounds. However, he scored on a ten-yard run a few plays later, and kicker John Carney sent the game away with a 33-yard field goal. With the win, the Saints improve to 8–4.

=== Week 14: at Dallas Cowboys ===
Quarter	1	2	3	4	Total
Saints	0	21	21	0	42
Cowboys	7	0	10	0	17

at Texas Stadium

- Game time: 8:15 pm EDT/7:15 pm CDT
- Game weather: 48 °F (8.9 °C), no wind
- Game attendance: 63,725
- Referee: Gerry Austin
- TV announcers (NBC): Al Michaels, John Madden, and Andrea Kremer

After a spectacular offensive performance all around by the Saints against the 49ers, they headed to Dallas to face off against their NFC rivals the Cowboys. The Cowboys started off strong with a 77-yard Julius Jones run, but they were silent for the rest of the quarter. In the second quarter, a shaky Saints team suddenly scored on all three of their drives: a 2-yard run from Mike Karney, a 3-yard pass from Drew Brees to Karney, and a 27-yard pass from Brees to WR Jamal Jones; and to cap it all off, Dallas kicker Martin Gramatica missed a field goal at the end of the half. A surprising Saints team stymied the Cowboys to a field goal by Gramatica, and Reggie Bush quickly answered with a 61-yard catch for a touchdown. Terrell Owens answered with a 34-yard touchdown catch. Mike Karney struck again with a 6-yard catch, and after a challenge by Sean Payton it was ruled a touchdown. The Saints recovered an onside kick at the 40, and Devery Henderson caught a 42-yard pass and crawled in for a touchdown. With the blowout against the Cowboys, the Saints improved to 9–4 and were one game away from clinching the NFC South. Mike Karney, who had three touchdowns, was dubbed "Mr. Touchdown" by Drew Brees.

=== Week 15: vs. Washington Redskins ===
Quarter	1	2	3	4	Total
Redskins	10	3	0	3	16
Saints	0	7	0	3	10

at Louisiana Superdome

- Game time: 1:00 pm EDT/12:00 pm CDT
- Game weather: Indoors (Domed stadium)
- Game attendance: 69,052
- Referee: Walt Coleman
- TV announcers (Fox): Kenny Albert, Brian Baldinger, and Chris Myers

The Washington Redskins entered the game strongly, with a solid drive straight down the field, but blitz, a fumble, and a penalty all worked against the Redskins, and forced a 37-yard field goal. However, they stifled the Saints offense and scored a quick touchdown later. The Saints answered back with a touchdown from the goal line, and limit the Redskins to a field goal. The surprising Redskins offense was hindered in the second quarter, as were the Saints, but in the beginning of the fourth, the Saints opened up with a field goal, which the Redskins quickly answered. In a key play, the Saints converted a 4th-and-5 play late in the fourth quarter, down 16–10, which led to another key 16-yard throw on third down on the 2-minute warning. Reggie Bush made a dash to the twenty-yard line two plays later, and the Saints took their second time out with 1:01 left in the 4th quarter. On 4th and 8 with 53 seconds left, Carlos Rogers knocked the ball down and sealed the Saints' fate. With the loss, the Saints fell to 9–5, but because the Carolina Panthers fell to the Pittsburgh Steelers, and the Atlanta Falcons fell to the Dallas Cowboys, they clinched the NFC South and a spot in the playoffs.

=== Week 16: at New York Giants ===
Quarter	1	2	3	4	Total
Saints	3	10	7	10	30
Giants	7	0	0	0	7

at Giants Stadium

- Game time: 1:00 pm EST/12:00 pm CST
- Game weather: 52 °F (11.1 °C), windy, cloudy.
- Game attendance: 78,539
- Referee: Bill Carollo
- TV announcers (Fox): Dick Stockton, Troy Aikman, and Pam Oliver

Despite their loss the previous week, the Saints could clinch a first-round bye with a win and help. They entered the Meadowlands against a Giants team trying to gain momentum that could lead them to a playoff spot. Hoping they could capitalize off the Saints loss, the Giants' first drive saw a 55-yard touchdown pass from Eli Manning to Plaxico Burress. The Saints' offense opened with a three-and-out, but they successfully recovered their punt. A field goal narrowed the score to 7–3. A subsequent Saints drive ended with another field goal. With 10:30 left in the second quarter, the Saints directed a huge, time-eating drive that ended with a touchdown on fourth-down with just 1:56 left in the half. Seven minutes into the third quarter, Reggie Bush sped past the Giants' linebacker corps and scored on a one-yard touchdown, to lengthen the score to 20–7. In the middle of the third quarter, Reggie Bush returned a punt, fell onto his knees. However, because nobody touched him he was not down by contact, and he then ran the ball in for a touchdown. Nevertheless, a challenge revealed that the Giants' punter just barely nicked the leg of Bush, and he was ultimately ruled down by contact. Early in the fourth quarter, Deuce McAllister ran it in for the final touchdown of the day, and John Carney sealed it with a 38-yard field goal. The Saints defense was stout throughout the game, shutting out the Giants after their opening touchdown, and never allowing the Giants to run a play in their territory. With the win, the Saints improved to 10–5. The following day, the Dallas Cowboys fell to the revitalized, Jeff Garcia-led Philadelphia Eagles, and the Saints secured the #2 spot in the NFC, and a first-round bye.

=== Week 17: vs. Carolina Panthers ===
Quarter	1	2	3	4	Total
Panthers	7	7	14	3	31
Saints	7	7	7	0	21

at Louisiana Superdome

- Game time: 1:00 pm EST/12:00 pm CST
- Game weather: Indoors (Domed stadium)
- Game attendance: 69,569
- Referee: Bill Leavy
- TV announcers (Fox): Sam Rosen and Tim Ryan

The New Orleans Saints hosted their final regular season game in the Superdome at 12:00 Central Time against their NFC South Rivals, the Carolina Panthers. On December 29, 2006, the Friday before the game, the Saints announced several roster moves. Players, such as RB Jamaal Branch, were activated from the practice squad. It was widely speculated that this was to help give some of the full-time starters rest before the post-season. The Saints allowed the starters to play in the first drive on offense, which ended up in a quick touchdown, and for the first two plays of the second drive, before resting all of the starters. The head coach of the Saints, Sean Payton, did this to prevent injuries before the playoff game. The Panthers ended up scraping together a 31–21 victory against the second and third stringers of the Saints.

== Postseason ==
=== Schedule ===
Round	Date	Opponent (seed)	Result	Record	Venue	Recap
Wild Card	First-round bye					
Divisional	January 13	Philadelphia Eagles (3)	W 27–24	1–0	Louisiana Superdome	Recap
NFC Championship	January 21	at Chicago Bears (1)	L 14–39	1–1	Soldier Field	Recap

=== NFC Divisional Round: vs. Philadelphia Eagles ===
Quarter	1	2	3	4	Total
Eagles	0	14	7	3	24
Saints	3	10	14	0	27

at Louisiana Superdome

- Game time: 8:00 pm EST/7:00 pm CST
- Game weather: Indoors (Domed stadium)
- Game attendance: 70,001
- Referee: Mike Carey
- TV announcers (Fox): Dick Stockton, Daryl Johnston, Tony Siragusa

Being in the divisional round for only the second time in franchise history, the second-seeded Saints began their playoff run against the third-seeded Philadelphia Eagles. With both teams coming into the game with the NFL's best offenses, the outlook was a high-scoring shootout. In the first quarter, New Orleans drew first blood with kicker John Carney nailing a 33-yard field goal for the only score of the period. In the second quarter, the Saints increased its lead with Carney kicking a 23-yard field goal. However, the Eagles took the lead with quarterback Jeff Garcia completing a 75-yard touchdown pass to former Saints wide receiver Donte' Stallworth. New Orleans retook the lead with rookie RB Reggie Bush ramming a 4-yard touchdown run; yet Philadelphia regained the lead with RB Brian Westbrook diving for a 1-yard touchdown run to exit the second quarter with a 14–13 lead. In the third quarter, the Eagles jabbed at the Saints' once-stoic running defense with another Westbrook touchdown run, this one for 62 yards. The Saints countered with RB Deuce McAllister shoving his way in with a 5-yard touchdown run; and finally, the Saints scored their final touchdown for the lead with a knockout 11-yard touchdown pass from Drew Brees to McAllister. In the fourth quarter, the Eagles drove down to the red zone and threatened to strike, but the Saints' defense stepped up and forced kicker David Akers to kick his only score for the Eagles, a 24-yard field goal. Suddenly it looked grim for the Saints when, on the ensuing drive, a pitch-out from Brees to Bush bounced off the running back's hands and the Eagles recovered. However, the Saints defense forced a 4th-and-10, and an 18-yard pass that seemed keep the Eagles alive was called back on a false start penalty. The Eagles punted with 1:39 remaining, and the Saints converted a first down on a run by McAllister to end the game.

During the game, the Saints made a franchise playoff record with 435 total yards of offense. Deuce McAllister gained a franchise playoff record 143 yards on 21 carries with 1 touchdown, along with 4 catches for 20 yards and 1 touchdown. Additionally, this is one of the very rare occasions where a team beats another in the same matchup in both the regular season and the playoffs with exactly the same score both times, as they won against the Eagles at home 27–24 in Week 6.

With the win, New Orleans improved its overall record to 11–6 and advanced to its first NFC Championship Game appearance in the team's 40-year franchise history, where they took on the Chicago Bears.

=== NFC Championship Game: at Chicago Bears ===
Quarter	1	2	3	4	Total
Saints	0	7	7	0	14
Bears	3	13	2	21	39

at Soldier Field

- Game time: 3:00 pm EST/2:00 pm CST
- Game weather: 28 °F (−2.2 °C) (Cloudy)
- Game attendance: 61,047
- Referee: Terry McAulay
- TV announcers (Fox): Joe Buck (play-by-play), Troy Aikman (color commentator), Pam Oliver (field reporter), and Chris Myers (field reporter)

Game information
- Q1 – CHI – 0:41 – Robbie Gould 19 yd FG (CHI 3–0)
- Q2 – CHI – 13:40 – Robbie Gould 43 yd FG (CHI 6–0)
- Q2 – CHI – 8:52 – Robbie Gould 24 yd FG (CHI 9–0)
- Q2 – CHI – 1:56 – Thomas Jones 2 yd touchdown run (Gould kick) (CHI 16–0)
- Q2 – NO – 0:46 – 13 yd touchdown pass from Drew Brees to Marques Colston (John Carney kick) (CHI 16–7)
- Q3 – NO – 12:20 – 88 yd touchdown pass from Drew Brees to Reggie Bush (Carney kick) (CHI 16–14)
- Q3 – CHI – 5:27 – Safety, Intentional Grounding on New Orleans (Drew Brees) (CHI 18–14)
- Q4 – CHI – 14:23 – 33 yd touchdown pass from Rex Grossman to Bernard Berrian (Gould kick) (CHI 25–14)
- Q4 – CHI – 11:37 – Cedric Benson 12 yd touchdown run (Gould kick) (CHI 32–14)
- Q4 – CHI – 4:19 – Thomas Jones 15 yd touchdown run (Gould Kick) (CHI 39–14)

Following their divisional win over the Eagles, the Saints flew to Soldier Field for their very first NFC Championship Game, where they took on the top-seeded Chicago Bears. In the first quarter, New Orleans trailed early with Bears kicker Robbie Gould getting a 19-yard field goal for the only score of the period. In the second quarter, the Saints continued to trail as Gould gave Chicago a 43-yard and a 23-yard field goal, while RB Thomas Jones got a 2-yard touchdown run. New Orleans managed to get some momentum for the second half as quarterback Drew Brees completed a 13-yard touchdown pass to rookie WR Marques Colston. In the third quarter, the Saints started to get more momentum as Brees completed an 88-yard touchdown pass to rookie RB Reggie Bush to make the score 16–14. However, that was as close as the Saints got, as the Bears took over the rest of the game, scoring 23 unanswered points. Brees was called for intentional grounding while in his own end zone, giving Chicago a safety and making the score 18–14 in favor of the Bears. In the fourth quarter, Chicago quarterback Rex Grossman completed a 33-yard touchdown pass to WR Bernard Berrian, Bears RB Cedric Benson scored a 12-yard touchdown run, and Jones wrapped up the game with a 15-yard touchdown run.

Pundits felt that the reason behind New Orleans' loss was that they were a "dome" team and were forced to play in snowy conditions while committing five turnovers. (Note: Three lost fumbles, an interception, and one on downs.)

With the loss, the Saints season ended with an overall record of 11–7. This would prove the last time until the 2020 season in which the Saints meet the Bears in the playoffs.
