= Ejiro =

Ejiro may refer to:

== People ==
=== First name ===
- Ejiro Amos Tafiri, Nigerian fashion designer
- Ejiro Evero (born 1981), American football coach
- Ejiro Kuale (born 1983), former professional American-Canadian football linebacker

=== Surname ===
- Chico Ejiro (?-2020), Nigerian movie director and screenwriter
- Zeb Ejiro, Nigerian filmmaker and producer
