= T. J. Williams =

T. J. Williams may refer to:

- T. J. Williams (American football)
- T. J. Williams (basketball)
