= 2006 Atlanta Falcons season =

NFL team season; final one with Michael Vick

- Owner: Arthur Blank
- General manager: Rich McKay
- Head coach: Jim Mora
- Offensive coordinator: Greg Knapp
- Defensive coordinator: Ed Donatell
- Home stadium: Georgia Dome

Results
- Record: 7–9
- Division place: 3rd NFC South
- Playoffs: Did not qualify
- Pro Bowlers: 2: TE Alge Crumpler; CB DeAngelo Hall

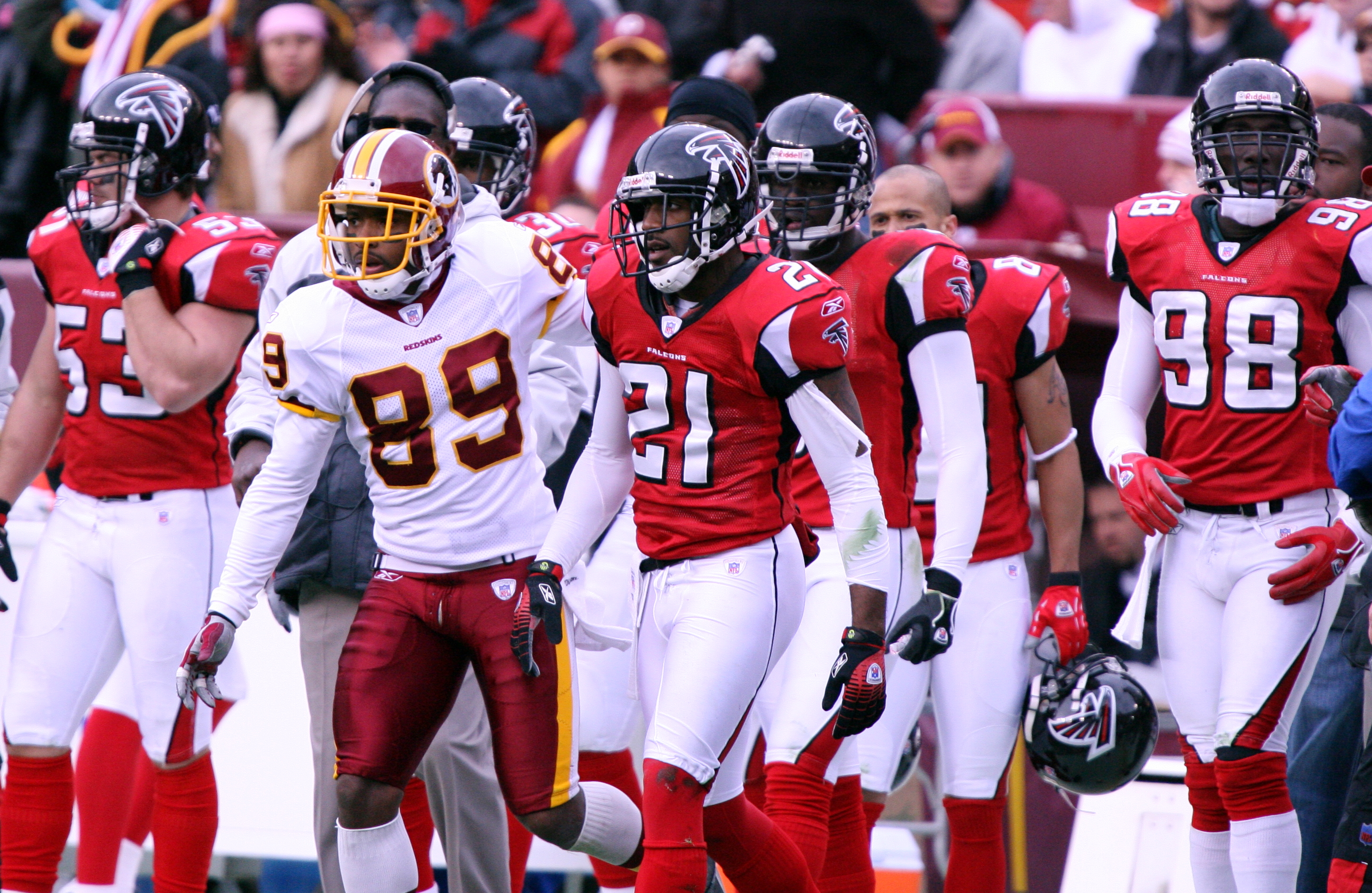
Falcons players at Washington on December 3

The 2006 Atlanta Falcons season was the franchise's 41st in the National Football League (NFL). The team attempted to improve on their 8–8 record in 2005.

Michael Vick became the first quarterback in modern NFL history to rush for over 1,000 yards, with 1,039. Running back Warrick Dunn rushed for 1,140 yards, making the 2006 Falcons only the fourth team in the history of the NFL and AFL since 1920 to have two 1,000-yard rushers. (Note: Previous teams: 1972 Dolphins, 1976 Steelers, 1985 Browns) The Falcons are, however, the only team (Note: as of 2020) to have multiple 1,000-yard rushers and finish the season with a losing record.

This was the end of the Michael Vick era in Atlanta as his dog fighting case led to his departure from the team the following season. Once again, the Falcons failed to make the playoffs despite beginning with a 5–2 record.

== Offseason ==
=== NFL draft ===
2006 Atlanta Falcons draft
Round	Pick	Player	Position	College	Notes
2	37	Jimmy Williams	Cornerback	Virginia Tech	
3	79	Jerious Norwood	Running back	Mississippi State	
5	139	Quinn Ojinnaka	Guard	Syracuse	
6	184	Adam Jennings	Wide receiver	Fresno State	
7	223	D. J. Shockley	Quarterback	Georgia	
Made roster

== Staff ==
2006 Atlanta Falcons staff
Front office: Owner/chief executive officer – Arthur Blank; President/general manager – Rich McKay; Senior personnel executive – Billy Devaney; Director of pro personnel – Les Snead; Director of college scouting – Phil Emery; Head coaches: Head coach – Jim Mora Jr.; Offensive coaches: Offensive coordinator – Greg Knapp; Quarterbacks – Bill Musgrave; Assistant quarterbacks – Robert Prince; Running backs – Ollie Wilson; Wide receivers – George Stewart; Tight ends – Clancy Barone; Offensive line/consultant – Alex Gibbs; Offensive line – Tom Cable; Assistant offensive line – Chris Dalman	Defensive coaches: Defensive coordinator – Ed Donatell; Defensive line – Bill Johnson; Linebackers – Chris Beake; Defensive backs – Brett Maxie; Senior defensive assistant/secondary – Emmitt Thomas; Defensive assistant – Joe Lombardi; Defensive assistant – Will Lewis; Special teams coaches: Special teams – Joe DeCamillis; Assistant special teams – Steve Hoffman; Strength and conditioning: Head strength and conditioning – Sal Alosi; Assistant strength and conditioning – Billy Johnson

== Roster ==
2006 Atlanta Falcons roster
Quarterbacks (QB): 8 Matt Schaub; 3 D. J. Shockley; 7 Michael Vick; Running backs (RB): 28 Warrick Dunn; 33 Justin Griffith FB; 44 Fred McCrary FB; 38 Corey McIntyre FB; 32 Jerious Norwood KR; 42 Jamal Robertson; Wide receivers (WR): 18 Jamin Elliott; 12 Michael Jenkins; 81 Adam Jennings; 87 Ashley Lelie; 84 Roddy White; Tight ends (TE): 80 Eric Beverly; 85 Dwayne Blakley; 83 Alge Crumpler; 89 Daniel Fells	Offensive linemen (OL): 64 P. J. Alexander G; 77 Tyson Clabo G; 72 Wayne Gandy T; 61 Matt Lehr G; 62 Todd McClure C; 76 Quinn Ojinnaka G/T; 70 Frank Omiyale G/T; 74 Todd Weiner T; Defensive linemen (DL): 55 John Abraham DE; 95 Jonathan Babineaux DT; 91 Paul Carrington DE; 75 Rod Coleman DT; 92 Chauncey Davis DE; 90 Grady Jackson DT; 99 T. J. Jackson DT; 94 Josh Mallard DE; 71 Darrell Shropshire DT	Linebackers (LB): 52 Jordan Beck OLB; 59 Michael Boley OLB; 56 Keith Brooking; 50 Edgerton Hartwell MLB; 53 John Leake MLB; 98 Ike Reese OLB; 51 Demorrio Williams OLB; Defensive backs (DB): 25 Chris Crocker FS; 21 DeAngelo Hall CB; 26 Omare Lowe CB/S; 36 Lawyer Milloy SS; 40 J. R. Reed FS; 20 Allen Rossum; 30 Lance Schulters SS; 24 Jimmy Williams CB; Special teams (ST): 5 Morten Andersen K; 9 Michael Koenen P; 47 Boone Stutz LS	Practice squad: 96 Michael Bozeman DT; 67 Brian Ferentz C; 22 Taurean Henderson RB; 35 Kevin Hobbs CB; 34 Marlion Jackson RB (IR); 68 Bo Lacy T; 63 Jason Palermo C/G; 17 Kevin Youngblood WR; Reserve: 29 Chris Cash CB (IR); 69 Ben Claxton G (IR); 86 Brian Finneran WR (IR); 65 Kynan Forney G (IR); 37 Derrick Johnson CB (IR); 97 Patrick Kerney DE (IR); 66 Austin King C (NF-Ill.); 23 Kevin Mathis S (IR); -- Gavin Tarquinio LS (IR); 40 Butchie Wallace RB (IR); 27 Jason Webster CB (IR); Rookies in italics 53 active, 12 reserve, 7 practice squad

== Schedule ==
In the 2006 regular season, the Falcons’ non-divisional, conference opponents were primarily from the NFC East, although they also played the Detroit Lions from the NFC North, and the Arizona Cardinals from the NFC West. Their non-conference opponents were from the AFC North.

Week	Date	Opponent	Result	Record	Game site	NFL.com recap
1	September 10	at **Carolina Panthers**	**W** 20–6	1–0	Bank of America Stadium	Recap
2	September 17	**Tampa Bay Buccaneers**	**W** 14–3	2–0	Georgia Dome	Recap
3	September 25	at **New Orleans Saints**	**L** 3–23	2–1	Louisiana Superdome	Recap
4	October 1	Arizona Cardinals	**W** 32–10	3–1	Georgia Dome	Recap
5	Bye					
6	October 15	New York Giants	**L** 14–27	3–2	Georgia Dome	Recap
7	October 22	Pittsburgh Steelers	**W** 41–38 (OT)	4–2	Georgia Dome	Recap
8	October 29	at Cincinnati Bengals	**W** 29–27	5–2	Paul Brown Stadium	Recap
9	November 5	at Detroit Lions	**L** 14–30	5–3	Ford Field	Recap
10	November 12	Cleveland Browns	**L** 13–17	5–4	Georgia Dome	Recap
11	November 19	at Baltimore Ravens	**L** 10–24	5–5	M&T Bank Stadium	Recap
12	November 26	**New Orleans Saints**	**L** 13–31	5–6	Georgia Dome	Recap
13	December 3	at Washington Redskins	**W** 24–14	6–6	FedExField	Recap
14	December 10	at **Tampa Bay Buccaneers**	**W** 17–6	7–6	Raymond James Stadium	Recap
15	December 16	Dallas Cowboys	**L** 28–38	7–7	Georgia Dome	Recap
16	December 24	**Carolina Panthers**	**L** 3–10	7–8	Georgia Dome	Recap
17	December 31	at Philadelphia Eagles	**L** 17–24	7–9	Lincoln Financial Field	Recap
Note: Intra-division opponents are in **bold** text

== Standings ==
NFC South
	W	L	T	PCT	DIV	CONF	PF	PA	STK
^{(2)} New Orleans Saints	10	6	0	.625	4–2	9–3	413	322	L1
Carolina Panthers	8	8	0	.500	5–1	6–6	270	305	W2
Atlanta Falcons	7	9	0	.438	3–3	5–7	292	328	L3
Tampa Bay Buccaneers	4	12	0	.250	0–6	2–10	211	353	L1

== Regular season ==
=== Week 1: at Carolina Panthers ===
	1	2	3	4	Total
Falcons	3	10	7	0	20
Panthers	3	0	3	0	6

at Bank of America Stadium, Charlotte, North Carolina
The Falcons opened the regular season on the road against the Carolina Panthers on September 10. Even though the Panthers scored first, with opposing kicker John Kasay getting a 54-yard field goal, the Falcons responded with a field goal of their own, as kicker Michael Koenen booted a 25-yarder. In the second quarter, the Falcons unleashed their best, as Koenen got a 32-yard field goal and QB Michael Vick completed a 34-yard pass to WR Michael Jenkins. The Panthers tried to respond in the third quarter with Kasay kicking a 46-yard field goal, but Vick and the Falcons put the game away with a 1-yard TD pass to TE Alge Crumpler. Other than Vick having a good game, Warrick Dunn contributed with 132 rushing yards, while Atlanta's newest member, defensive end John Abraham, had 5 tackles, 2 sacks and two forced fumbles.

With the win, the Falcons started the season at 1–0.

=== Week 2: vs. Tampa Bay Buccaneers ===
	1	2	3	4	Total
Buccaneers	0	3	0	0	3
Falcons	7	7	0	0	14

at the Georgia Dome, Atlanta, Georgia
The Falcons entered their Week 2 home-opener against another NFC South rival, the Tampa Bay Buccaneers. The only Atlanta scores of the game came in the first quarter, with a 1-yard TD run on QB Michael Vick's QB sneak. The only other Falcons score came in the second quarter, with RB Fred McCrary getting a 4-yard TD run. The Buccaneers only score of the game came in the second quarter, with opposing kicker Matt Bryant kicking a 22-yard field goal. The ground game made short work of the Tampa Defense, with Michael Vick and Warrick Dunn combining for 261 rushing yards. Rookie running back Jerious Norwood added 45 more rushing yards to the Falcon's total. The Falcons set a new franchise record for rushing yards in a game with 306. On the other side of the ball, the Falcons defense shut down the Tampa offense, with DeAngelo Hall picking off two passes and Jason Webster picking off one. Also, they held Tampa Bay RB Carnell "Cadillac" Williams to just 37 yards on 15 carries. Special teams struggled as kicker Michael Koenen missed three field goals and had one blocked, making him 2/8 so far this season.

With the win, the Falcons improved to 2–0.

=== Week 3: at New Orleans Saints ===
	1	2	3	4	Total
Falcons	3	0	0	0	3
Saints	14	6	3	0	23

at the Louisiana Superdome, New Orleans, Louisiana
Following two-straight wins over two division opponents (the Bucs and the Panthers), the Falcons flew to the Louisiana Superdome to take on the New Orleans Saints, who were playing in the Superdome for the first time since December 2004 due to Hurricane Katrina, for an NFC South match-up on Monday Night. From the get-go the Falcons trailed, when they had a punt blocked by Saints safety Steve Gleason and DB Curtis Deloatch landed on the ball in the end zone for the touchdown. The Falcons responded as kicker Morten Andersen kicked a 26-yard field goal. That was their only score of the night, as WR Devery Henderson ran for an 11-yard TD on a reverse. Then, Saints kicker John Carney provided the remaining points for the New Orleans, with two field goals in the second quarter (a 37-yarder and a 51-yarder) and one field goal in the third (a 20-yarder). The Falcons fell to 2–1. QB Michael Vick was sacked five times, while he and RB Warrick Dunn combined for only 101 rushing yards.

=== Week 4: vs. Arizona Cardinals ===
	1	2	3	4	Total
Cardinals	3	7	0	0	10
Falcons	6	6	10	10	32

at the Georgia Dome, Atlanta, Georgia
Coming into this game, the Falcons were (once again) the number one rushing team in the NFL. Against the hapless Arizona Cardinals, QB Mike Vick and RB Jerious Norwood both ran for over 100 yards each, making the Falcons the only NFL team in history to have a quarterback and running back run for 100+ yards in a game twice in a franchise's history. (Vick and RB Warrick Dunn both surpassed the 100-yard rushing mark in Week 2). Jerious Norwood also set a new franchise record for the longest run in team history with a 78-yard touchdown. Atlanta's victory was led by their defense and they ended Kurt Warner’s undefeated streak at the Georgia Dome. Warner was promptly benched because of his sub-par play; Patrick Kerney’s two sacks didn't help his cause either. Matt Leinart played in his first NFL game as a rookie. Even with Arizona's adjustments, the Falcons managed to rebound and held on to win 32–10. Atlanta entered its bye week at 3–1.

=== Week 6: vs. New York Giants ===
	1	2	3	4	Total
Giants	0	3	14	10	27
Falcons	0	7	7	0	14

at the Georgia Dome, Atlanta, Georgia

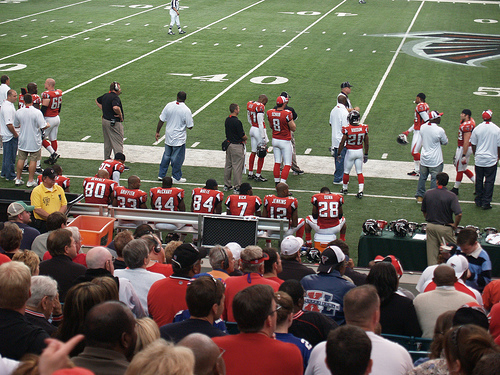
Michael Vick (among other players) on the sidelines during week 6

Coming off their Bye Week, the Falcons lost their second game of the season against the New York Giants.

A defensive battle early in the game, the first quarter went scoreless. The Giants got on the board first when former Falcons kicker Jay Feely connected on a 21-yard field goal midway through the second quarter. The Falcons responded when quarterback Michael Vick scored on a 22-yard rushing touchdown to take a 7–3 halftime lead. Falcons running back Warrick Dunn opened the second half in a big way, scoring on a franchise record 90-yard touchdown run. That was all the Falcons had left as the Giants proceeded to score 24 unanswered points to take control of the game when many of the Falcons' vaunted defensive starters had to leave the game due to injury. Quarterback Eli Manning hit tight end Jeremy Shockey twice for touchdowns in the second half, and backup running back Brandon Jacobs ran one in. Giants running back Tiki Barber rushed for a season high 185 yards, and Feely added another field goal.

With the loss, the Falcons fell to 3–2.

=== Week 7: vs. Pittsburgh Steelers ===
	1	2	3	4	OT	Total
Steelers	10	14	7	7	0	38
Falcons	7	14	14	3	3	41

at the Georgia Dome, Atlanta, Georgia
The Falcons welcomed the defending Super Bowl Champion Pittsburgh Steelers to town. The Falcons beat the Steelers in overtime, 41–38. The Falcons recovered a Steelers fumble after they punted to start the game. On the next play Michael Vick hit Alge Crumpler for a 22-yard touchdown pass. It was the first in a career-high four touchdown pass game for Vick. After Steelers’ kicker Jeff Reed kicked a 28-yard, the Steelers’ defense held and forced the Falcons to give up the ball again when Steelers' safety Troy Polamalu intercepted Vick. Steelers’ quarterback Ben Roethlisberger hit Georgia native and Steelers’ receiver Hines Ward for an 11-yard touchdown pass to give the Steelers a 10–7 lead after one quarter of play. On the next Steelers’ drive, Roethlisberger found Heath Miller for a 1-yard touchdown pass to give the Steelers a 17–7 lead. The Steelers then fumbled on the first play of their following drive and the Falcons took over. Six plays later Vick found Crumpler again, this time for a 3-yard touchdown pass to cut the Steelers’ lead to 17–14. The teams exchanged touchdowns and the Steelers led at halftime, 24–21. The first score of the second half came after another Steelers fumble when Warrick Dunn scored on a 3-yard touchdown run to put the Falcons ahead for the second time in the game, 28–24. Steelers' backup quarterback Charlie Batch, who came in for an injured Roethlisberger, hit Ward for a 70-yard touchdown pass to give the Steelers a 31–28 lead. The Falcons answered when Vick found Crumpler for a third time in the game with a 31-yard touchdown pass that put the Falcons ahead, 35–31. After the Falcons' Morten Andersen kicked a 25-yard field goal to give the Falcons a 38–31 lead, the Steelers came back again with a Batch 17-yard touchdown pass to tie the game at 38 and force overtime. In overtime the Falcons won the coin toss. Falcons' kicker Morten Andersen, after an 11-play 65-yard drive, put the capper on the game with a 32-yard field goal to give the Falcons an overtime victory over the Steelers as the team improved to 4–2 (3-1 at home & 1-0 against the AFC North). As of 2026, this remains the Falcons last win over Pittsburgh.

=== Week 8: at Cincinnati Bengals ===
	1	2	3	4	Total
Falcons	6	7	13	3	29
Bengals	7	10	3	7	27

at Paul Brown Stadium, Cincinnati, Ohio
In Week 8, the Falcons traveled to Paul Brown Stadium in Cincinnati to take on the Bengals. The star of the game was QB Michael Vick. Vick had the second best game of his career with a quarterback rating of 140.6, and passed for a season high 291 yards and touchdowns to Alge Crumpler, Michael Jenkins and Justin Griffith. The Falcons were down early to the Bengals 14–6, but were leading 29–20 with 7 minutes remaining. A late touchdown to the Bengals set up a thrilling finish to the match, with Atlanta's defence proving too tough for Cincinnati, sacking Bengals’ QB Carson Palmer to seal the match as the team's comeback win improved the team to 5–2.

=== Week 9: at Detroit Lions ===
	1	2	3	4	Total
Falcons	7	7	0	0	14
Lions	10	7	3	10	30

at Ford Field, Detroit, Michigan
Coming off an impressive road performance against the Bengals, the Falcons flew to Ford Field for Week 9 as they took on the Detroit Lions. Atlanta fell behind early, as Lions kicker Jason Hanson kicked a 28-yard field goal, followed up by a 35-yard TD run by RB Kevin Jones. The Falcons scored on QB Michael Vick’s 19-yard TD pass to TE Alge Crumpler. In the second quarter, Jones scored another touchdown on a 2-yard run, while Atlanta RB Warrick Dunn scored on a 1-yard TD run. In the third quarter, Hanson kicked a 19-yard field goal for the Lions with the only score of the period. In the fourth quarter, the Falcons fell as QB Jon Kitna completed a 60-yard TD pass to WR Roy Williams and Hanson kicked a 36-yard field goal to end the game in favor of Detroit. With the loss, the Falcons fell to 5–3.

=== Week 10: vs. Cleveland Browns ===
	1	2	3	4	Total
Browns	7	7	0	3	17
Falcons	0	3	7	3	13

at the Georgia Dome, Atlanta, Georgia
It wasn't any easier for the Falcons hosting the Browns. Another below .500 opponent against whom the Falcons were favored to win and get back on track, the team's offense was stifled and had its production limited by the hard fighting defense of the Browns. After a battle of field position in which the Browns generally won, they decided to go for it on a 4th and 1 inside the 5-yard line of Falcons territory. After getting the touchdown from their running back, the Browns scored again on a slant rout to their receiver once again burning the Falcons secondary and were ahead 14–0. The Falcons could only manage to score a field goal before half-time, and even this field goal was preceded by wacky play of laterals by the Falcons failing to find the endzone. Nevertheless, the Falcons managed to score a touchdown via Michael Jenkins diving in the endzone, and it seemed Atlanta could make a stand. However, the Falcons did not get a call for a safety, and on the next drive the Browns scored another field goal. With a chance to go for the winning touchdown on the two-minute offense thanks to Roddy White's leaping catch, the Falcons threaten deep inside Browns territory. However, a weary Michael Vick, unable to find open receivers, soon tried to make the play for himself and scrambled, but held the ball loosely like in the Lions game. Without being hit, Vick fumbled the ball bouncing twice into his chest, and the ball popped loose to the Browns, ending the Falcons’ chance for a victory.

=== Week 11: at Baltimore Ravens ===
	1	2	3	4	Total
Falcons	7	0	3	0	10
Ravens	0	0	17	7	24

at M&T Bank Stadium, Baltimore, Maryland
The Falcons traveled to M&T Bank Stadium in Baltimore to take on the Ravens only to succumb to the AFC North leader. At the start of the game Falcons jumped out a 7–0 lead. Michael Vick completed a 12-yard pass to WR Michael Jenkins for a touchdown, but the Ravens used the kick/punt returning of B.J. Sams to pick up an impressive 212 yards on six carries and dominate the second half. Michael Vick had six carries also, but could not gain sufficient yards against the sturdy Raven defense. Vick was also sacked a total of five times. The Falcons managed to kick a field goal to move the score to 10–17 during the second half, but RB Jamal Lewis ran 5 yards for one more touchdown, which made the score 10–24. Lewis finished with a 91-yard, 3-TD performance, ending his 35-game multi-TD drought. Michael Vick had 6 carries for 54 yards and completed 11 out of 21 passes for 127 yards. The Falcons dropped to a disappointing record of 5–5 and suffered their third consecutive loss.

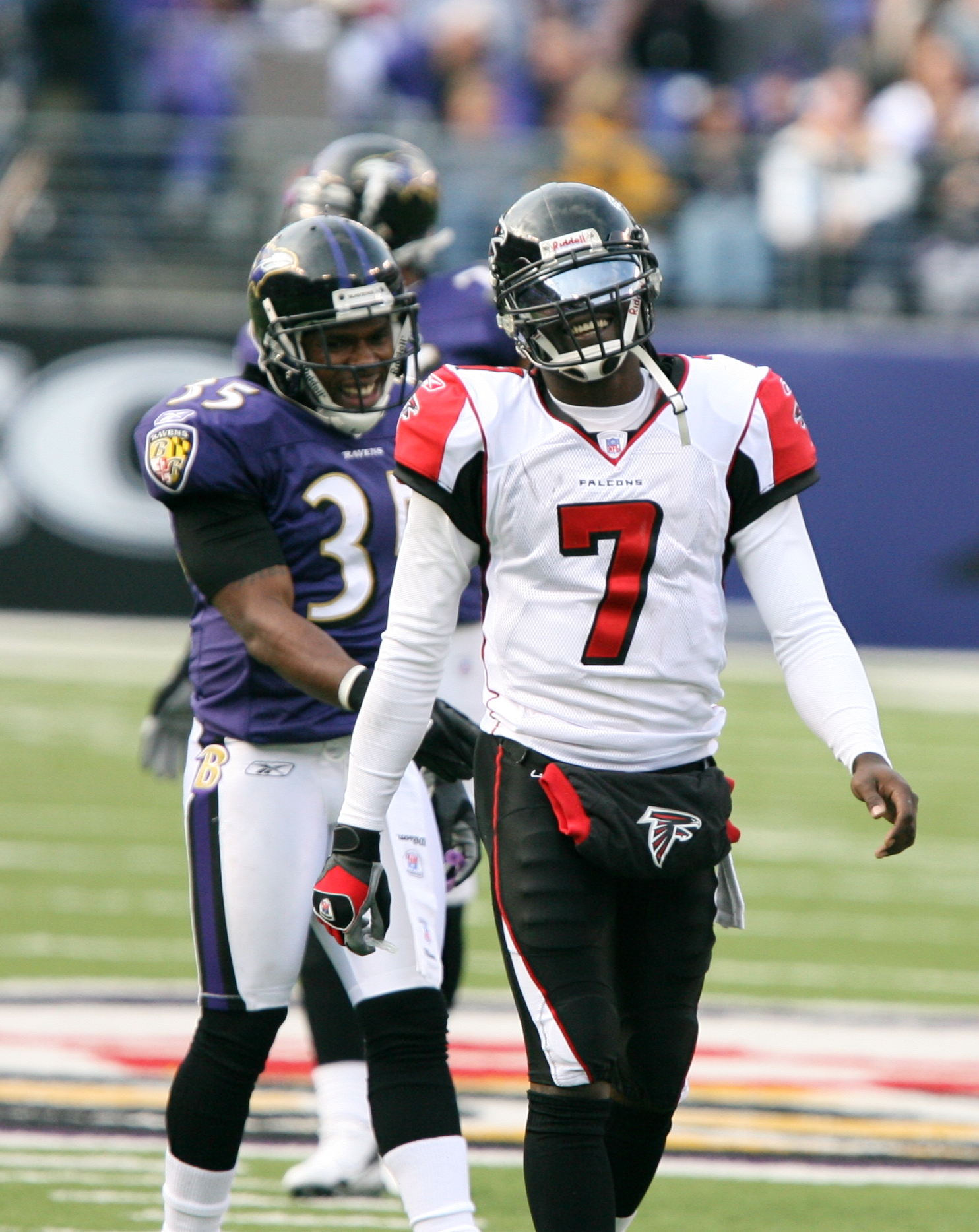
Vick and Baltimore's Corey Ivy in the week 11 loss

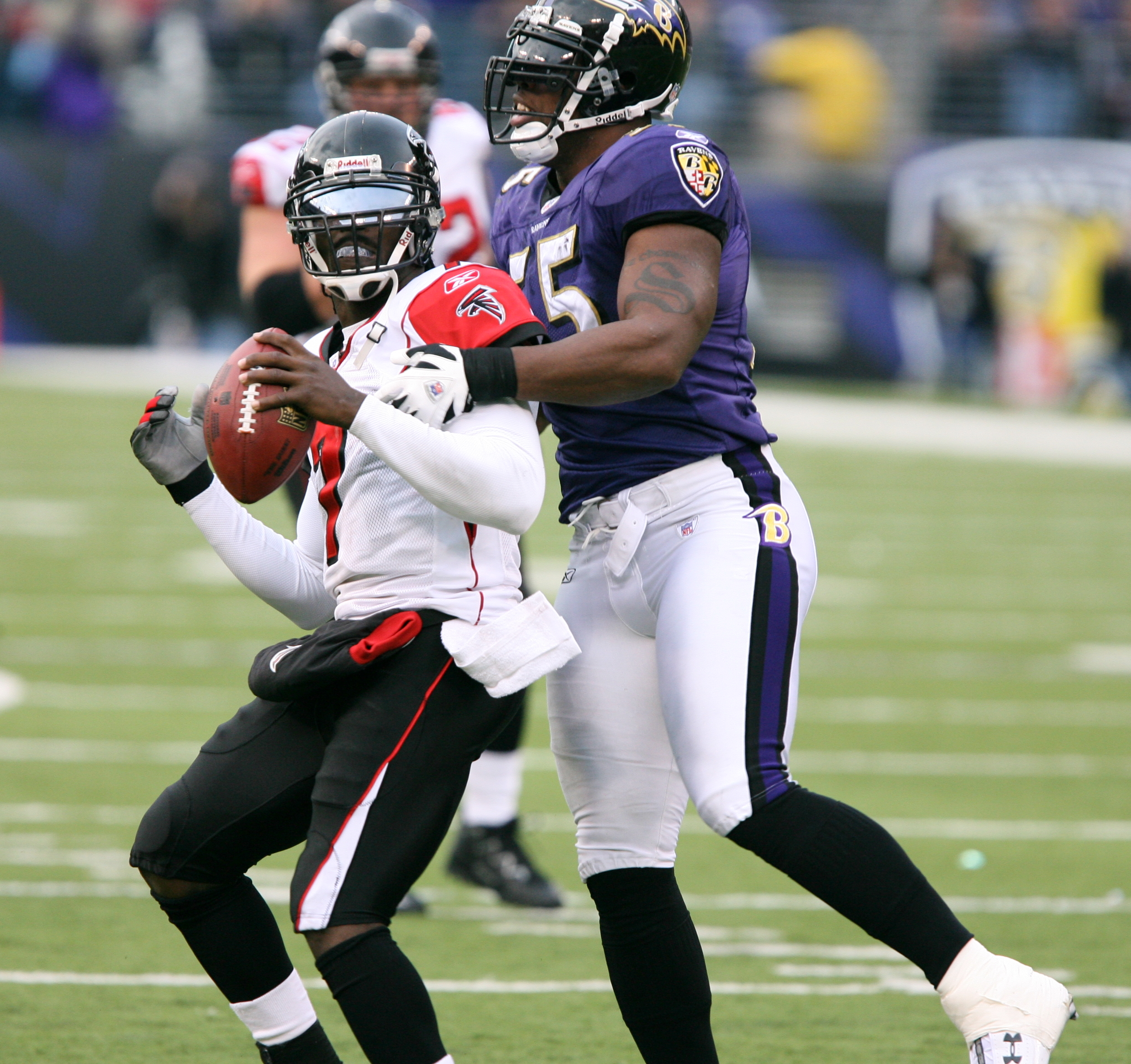
Vick with Baltimore's Terrell Suggs

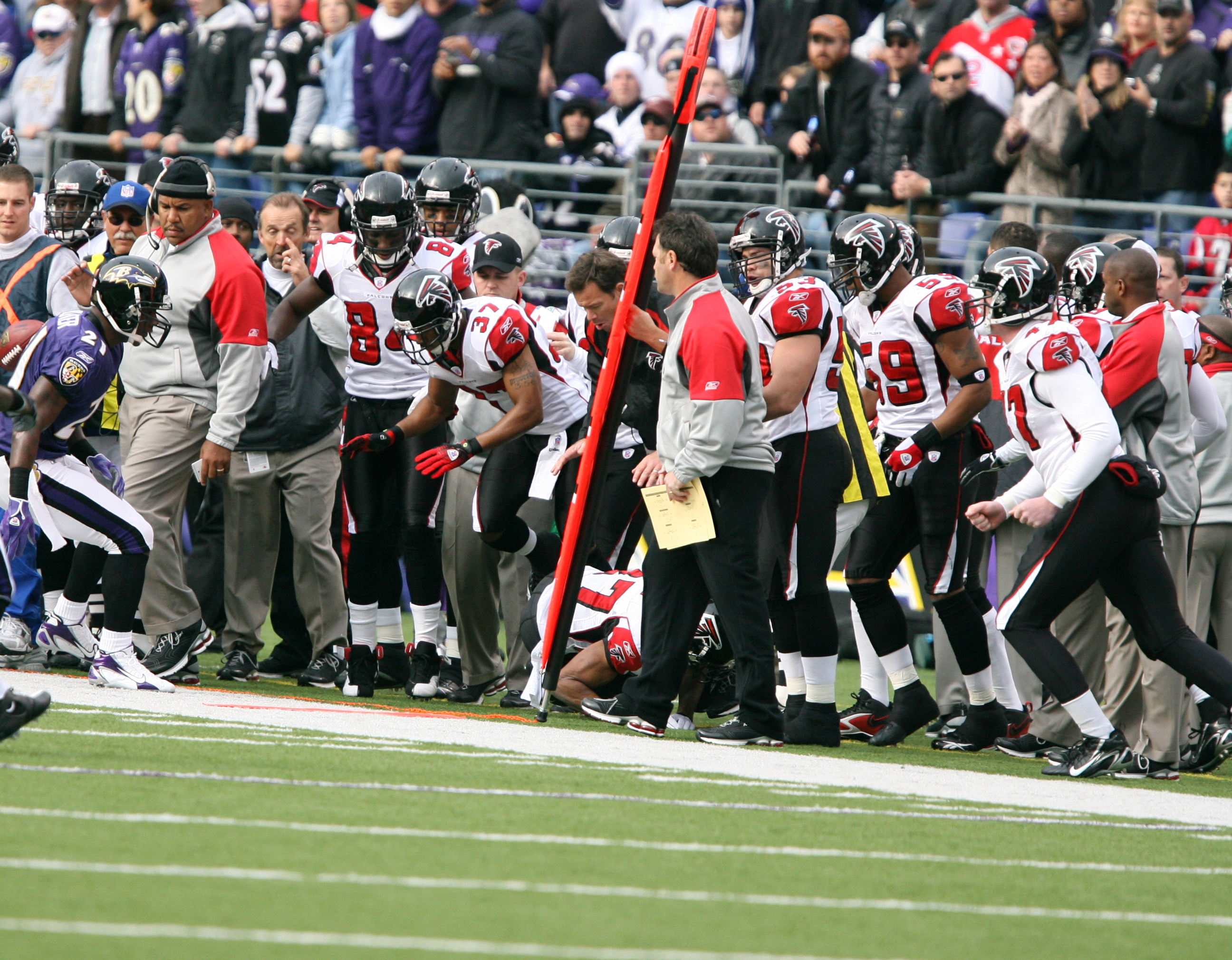
The Falcons sideline during the game

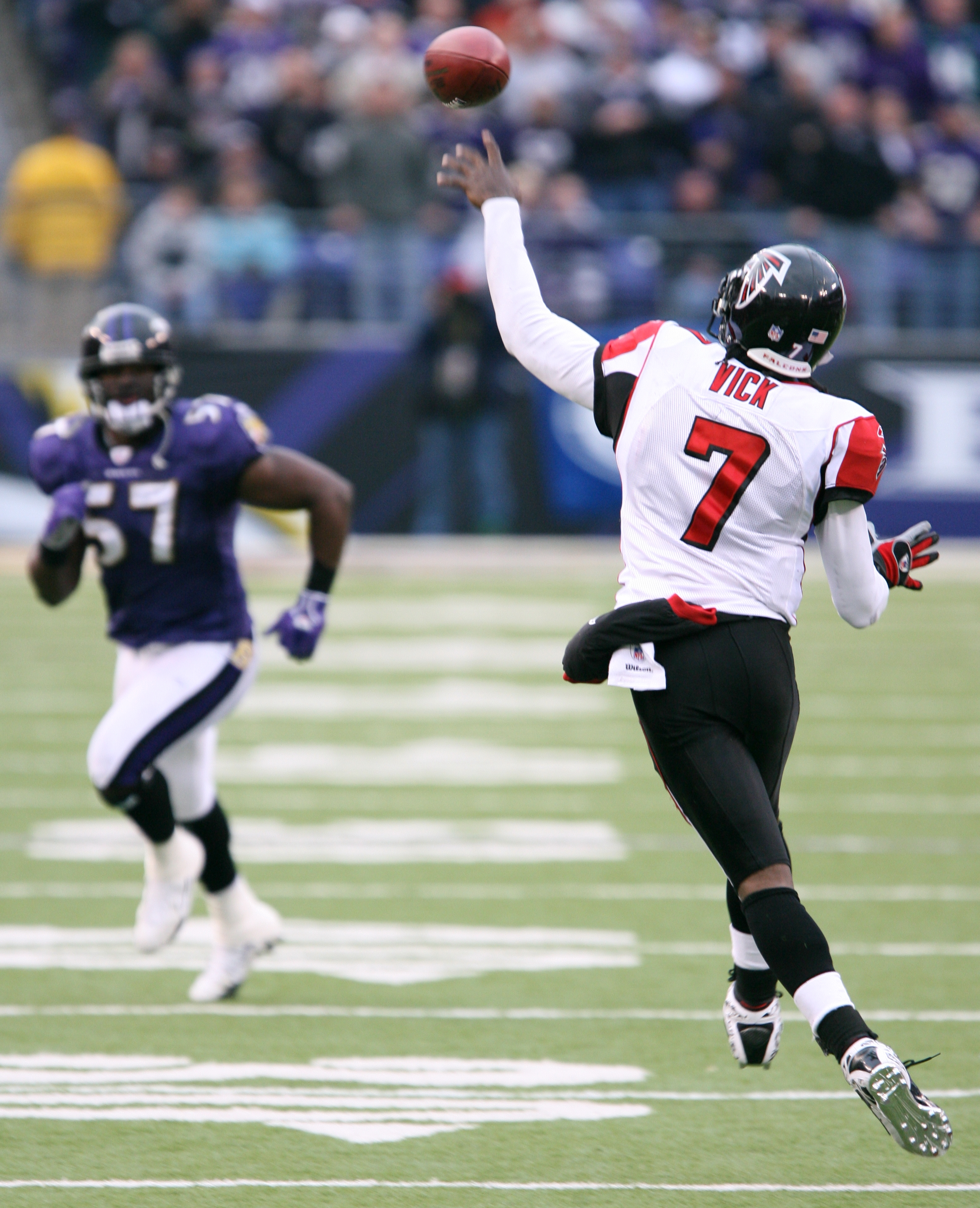
Vick passing against Baltimore

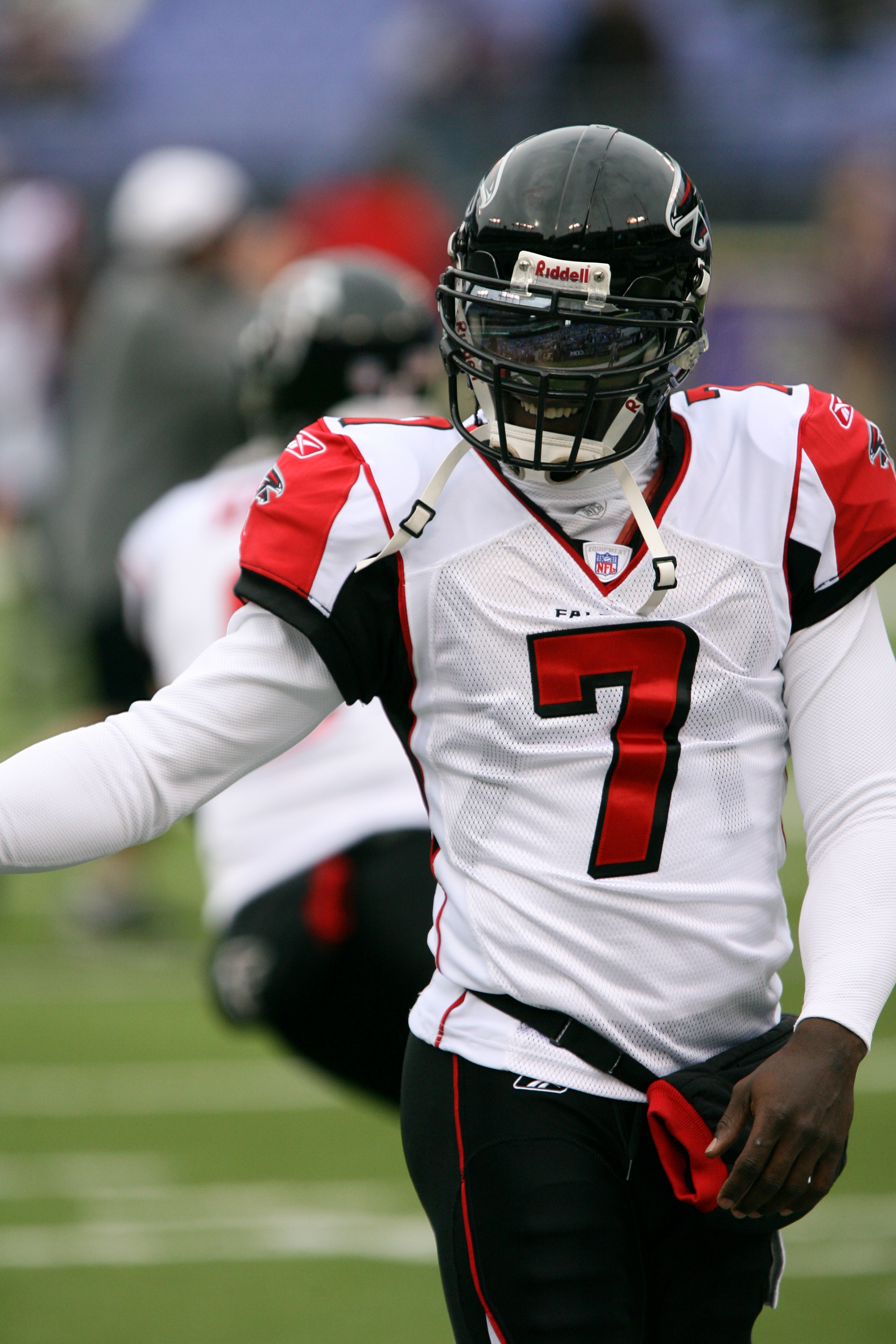
Vick between plays at Baltimore

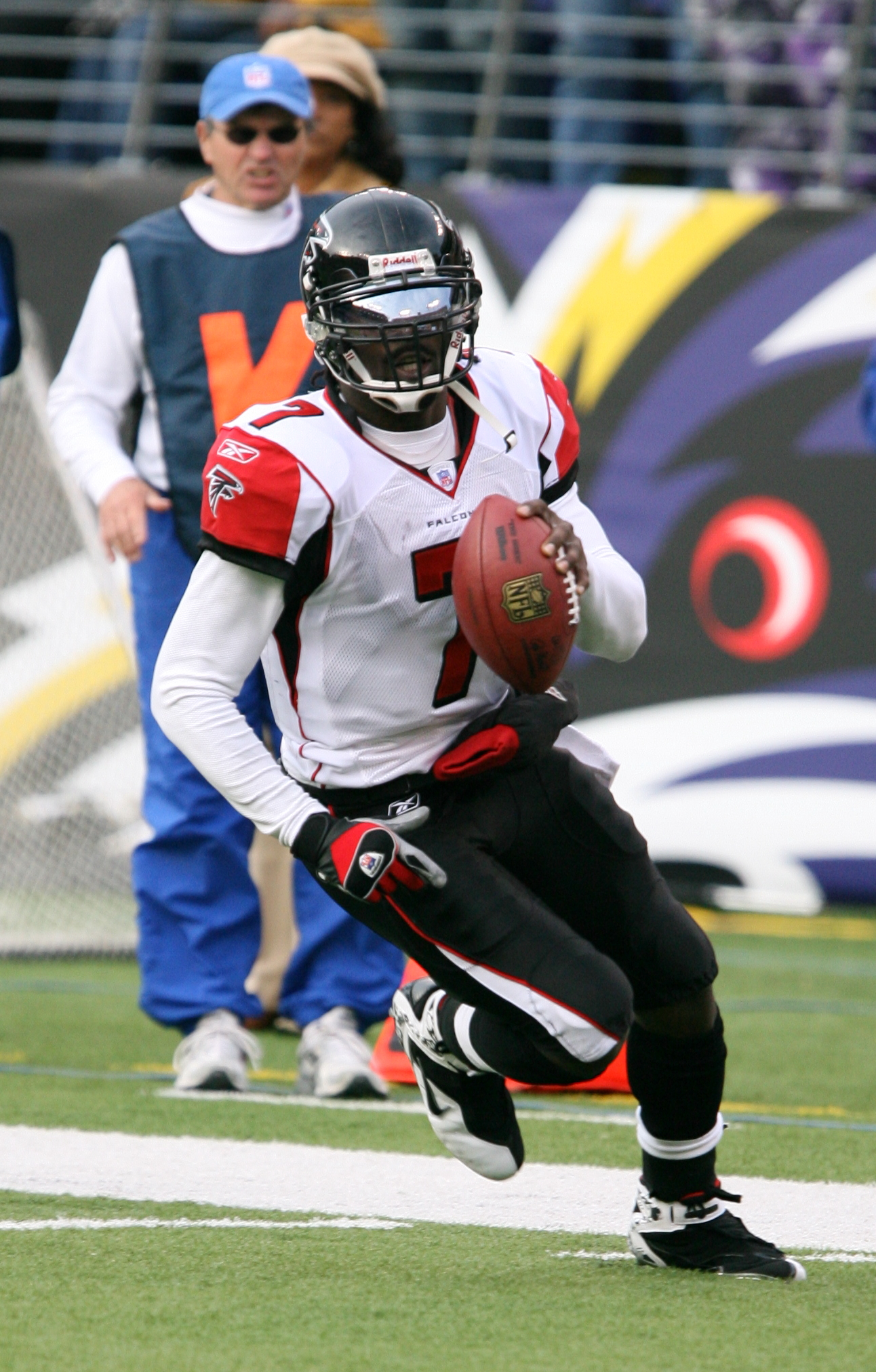
Vick running against Baltimore

=== Week 12: vs. New Orleans Saints ===
	1	2	3	4	Total
Saints	14	7	0	10	31
Falcons	3	3	7	0	13

at the Georgia Dome, Atlanta, Georgia
Trying to end a three-game skid, the Falcons returned home for an NFC South rematch with the New Orleans Saints. From the get-go, the Falcons trailed as in the first quarter, QB Drew Brees completed a 76-yard TD pass to WR Devery Henderson, while RB Deuce McAllister got a 1-yard TD run. Atlanta responded with kicker Morten Andersen kicking a 22-yard field goal. In the second quarter, Andersen gave the Falcons a 30-yard field goal, yet New Orleans continued dominating with Brees completing an incredible 48-yard TD pass to WR Terrance Copper on the very last offensive play of the half. In the third quarter, RB Warrick Dunn gave Atlanta some room to operate, as he a 1-yard TD run for the only score of the half. However, in the fourth quarter, the Saints wrapped up the game with kicker John Carney getting a 25-yard field goal, while McAllister got a 9-yard TD run. After the game, as QB Michael Vick was leaving the field, he flicked off an insulting fan with both hands. He was fined $10,000 from the NFL and had to donate another $10,000 to charity. With their fourth-straight loss, the Falcons fell to 5–6.

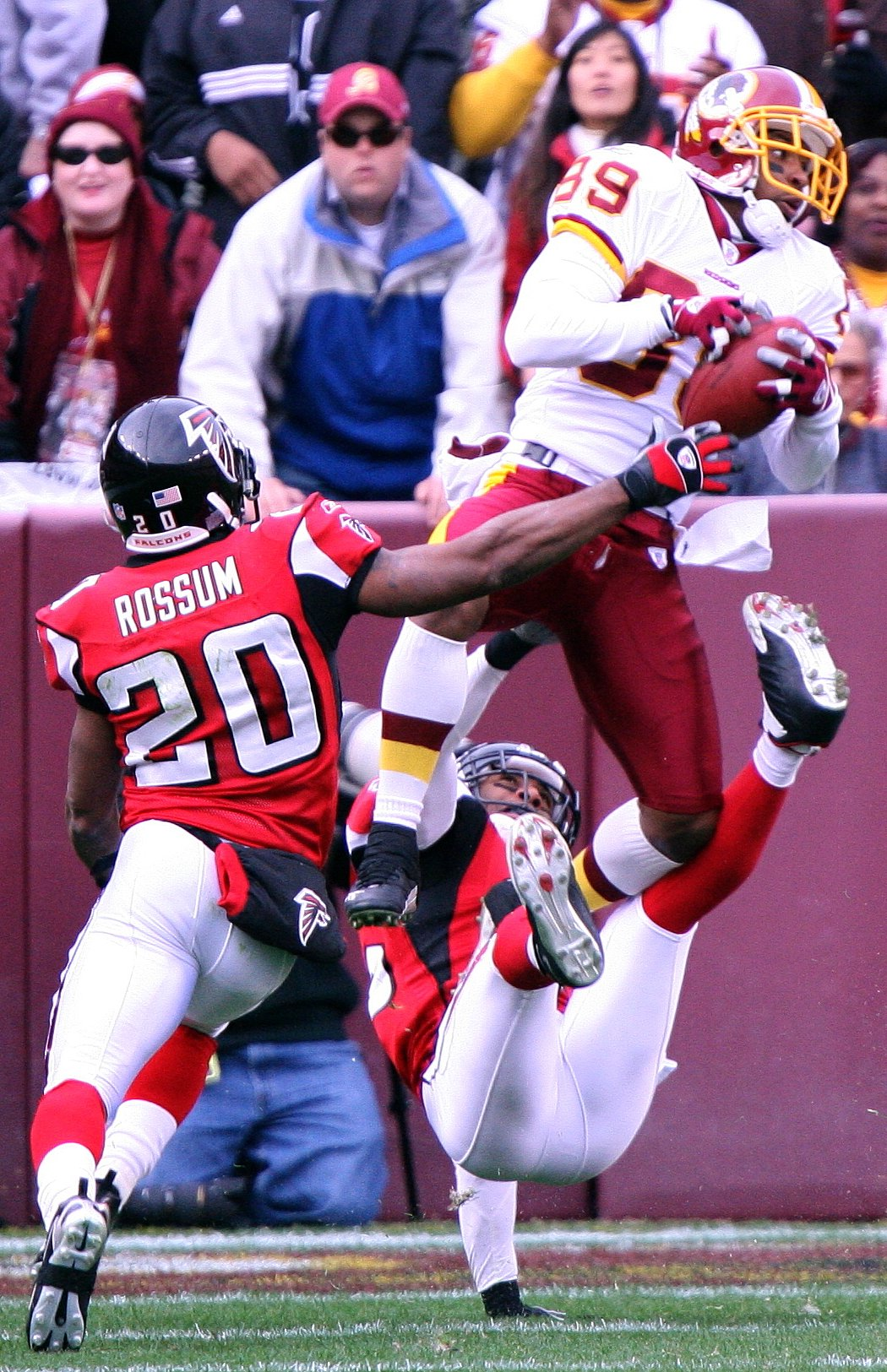
Atlanta battles Santana Moss in week 13

=== Week 13: at Washington Redskins ===
	1	2	3	4	Total
Falcons	0	10	7	7	24
Redskins	14	0	0	0	14

at FedExField, Landover, Maryland
The Falcons visited FedExField in Landover, Maryland and defeated the Washington Redskins, ending a four-game losing skid. In the first quarter, the Redskins started strong with two touchdowns on their first two possessions. The first coming off an 8-yard TD run by RB Ladell Betts, and the second with QB Jason Campbell completing a 42-yard TD pass to WR Santana Moss. In the second quarter, the Falcons got on the board with a 34-yard field goal by kicker Morten Andersen and QB Michael Vick's 16-yard TD pass to TE Alge Crumpler. In the third quarter, Atlanta finally gained the lead when Vick connected with WR Michael Jenkins for a 22-yard TD pass. In the fourth quarter, the Falcons sealed the win with RB Jerious Norwood's 69-yard touchdown run. With the victory, Atlanta improved to 6–6.

=== Week 14: at Tampa Bay Buccaneers ===
	1	2	3	4	Total
Falcons	0	0	14	3	17
Buccaneers	3	3	0	0	6

at Raymond James Stadium, Tampa, Florida
The Falcons traveled to Raymond James Stadium in Tampa, Florida on December 10 and squared off in an NFC South rematch against their division rival, the Tampa Bay Buccaneers. Their victory completed a season sweep. The first quarter started off with the Falcons punting away on their first possession. The Bucs then came back with a 10-play drive that resulted in a 42-yard field goal by kicker Matt Bryant. The second quarter saw Tampa Bay scoring another Bryant FG after a 12-play drive. In the third quarter, Atlanta scored their first points of the game off a 54-yard fumble return by OLB Demorrio Williams. The fumble occurred after Tampa QB Bruce Gradkowski lost the ball upon being sacked by Falcons DE John Abraham. Later in the same quarter, the Falcons went on to score another touchdown after a 21-yard run up the middle by FB Justin Griffith that completed a 9-play drive. Finally, in the fourth quarter, Atlanta sealed the game victory after picking up a field goal by kicker Morten Andersen that followed another Tampa Bay fumble by RB Carnell "Cadillac" Williams. Atlanta picked up its second win in a row, raising their record to 7–6.

=== Week 15: vs. Dallas Cowboys ===
	1	2	3	4	Total
Cowboys	7	14	10	7	38
Falcons	0	21	7	0	28

at the Georgia Dome, Atlanta, Georgia
Coming off their season-sweep in Tampa over the Buccaneers, the Falcons went home for a crucial Saturday night fight with the Dallas Cowboys. In the first quarter, Atlanta trailed early with Cowboys QB Tony Romo completing a 7-yard TD pass to WR Terrell Owens for the only score of the period. In the second quarter, Dallas’ lead increased with OLB returning an interception 41 yards for a touchdown on the very first play of the period. The Falcons fought back with QB Michael Vick throwing a 1-yard TD pass to FB Justin Griffith and a 9-yard TD pass to WR Michael Jenkins. It was after the second touchdown that an NFL record was set. After kicker Morten Andersen's extra point, he became the league's all-time leading scorer with 2,435 points. His total after the game was 2,437 points.

After Atlanta's second score of the game, the Cowboys jumped back into action, with Romo completing a 51-yard TD pass to Owens. The Falcons managed to tie the game going into halftime with Vick's 8-yard TD pass to WR Ashley Lelie. In the third quarter, Atlanta took the lead with Vick's 5-yard TD pass to Griffith. However, the joy was short-lived as Dallas took over for the rest of the game with kicker Martin Gramatica’s 48-yard field goal and RB Marion Barber’s 9-yard TD run. In the fourth quarter, the Cowboys wrapped up the game with Barber's 3-yard TD run. With the loss, the Falcons fell to 7–7.

Along with Andersen’s record-setting night, Vick also managed to set a record for the most single-season rushing yards by a quarterback with 934 yards at game’s end, although he would play in only one more game. The entire Falcon rushing corps also broke the single-season rushing record that they set two seasons ago (which was 2,672) with a new record of 2,697 yards.

=== Week 16: vs. Carolina Panthers ===
	1	2	3	4	Total
Panthers	0	10	0	0	10
Falcons	3	0	0	0	3

at the Georgia Dome, Atlanta, Georgia
Hoping to rebound from their Saturday night loss to the Cowboys and keep any playoff hope alive, the Falcons stayed at home for Christmas Eve as they played an NFC South grudge match with the Carolina Panthers. In the first quarter, Atlanta struck first with kicker Morten Andersen nailing a 40-yard field goal for the only score of the period. However, in the second quarter, the Panthers took the lead and won with QB Chris Weinke completing a 1-yard TD pass to TE Jeff King and kicker John Kasay completing a 42-yard field goal. Afterwards, defense ruled the game and the Falcons ended up on the losing end. QB Michael Vick ended up with a dismal 9/20 for 109 yards with no touchdowns and two interceptions, yet he became the first quarterback in NFL history to rush for 1,000 yards in a season before being suspended for the next two years.

Atlanta fell to 7–8 and also fell out of the playoff race with the New York Giants’ Week 17 Saturday night win over the Washington Redskins.

=== Week 17: at Philadelphia Eagles ===
	1	2	3	4	Total
Falcons	7	3	0	7	17
Eagles	10	7	0	7	24

at Lincoln Financial Field, Philadelphia, Pennsylvania
Trying to end their season on a positive note, the Falcons flew to Lincoln Financial Field for the first time since losing the 2004 NFC championship game, in a Week 17 intraconference fight with the playoff-bound Philadelphia Eagles. In the first quarter, the Eagles drew first blood as kicker David Akers nailed a 41-yard field goal. Quarterback Michael Vick completed a 7-yard TD pass to RB Warrick Dunn. However, Philadelphia flew back into the lead with back-up QB A. J. Feeley completing a 14-yard TD pass to TE Matt Schobel. In the second quarter, the Falcons tied the game with kicker Morten Andersen nailing a 45-yard field goal. Michael Vick would sustain an injury and be replaced by back-up Matt Schaub. This was the final game Vick played as an Atlanta Falcon. The Eagles responded with Feeley completing a 5-yard TD pass to rookie WR Jason Avant. After a scoreless third quarter, Atlanta responded in the fourth quarter with back-up QB Schaub completing a 9-yard TD pass to TE Alge Crumpler. However, Philadelphia wrapped up the game via Feeley completing an 89-yard touchdown pass to WR Hank Baskett. With the loss, the Falcons ended their season at 7–9.

In the aftermath, Jim Mora Jr. ended up getting fired on New Year's Day, ending his three-year tenure as head coach.
