= Jeremy Trueblood =

American football player (born 1983)

No. 65
- Position: Offensive tackle

Personal information
- Born: May 10, 1983 (age 43); Indianapolis, Indiana, U.S.
- Listed height: 6 ft 8 in (2.03 m)
- Listed weight: 320 lb (145 kg)

Career information
- High school: Cathedral (Indianapolis)
- College: Boston College
- NFL draft: 2006: 2nd round, 59th overall pick

Career history
- Tampa Bay Buccaneers (2006−2012); Washington Redskins (2013)*; Atlanta Falcons (2013)
- * Offseason or practice squad member only

Awards and highlights
- Second-team All-ACC (2005)

Career NFL statistics
- Games played: 116
- Games started: 94
- Fumble recoveries: 3
- Stats at Pro Football Reference

Jeremy Tyler Trueblood (born May 10, 1983) is an American former professional football player who was an offensive tackle in the National Football League (NFL). He played college football for the Boston College Eagles and was selected by the Tampa Bay Buccaneers in the second round of the 2006 NFL draft.

Trueblood was also a member of the Washington Redskins and Atlanta Falcons.

== Early life ==
Trueblood attended Cathedral High School in Indianapolis, where he was a classmate and teammate of fellow 2006 NFL draftee Mathias Kiwanuka. Kiwanuka was also his classmate and teammate at Boston College. At Cathedral, he received all-city and all-state awards in 1998, 1999 and 2000. He also helped lead his team to back to back state championships.

== College career ==
Trueblood played college football at Boston College from 2002 to 2005. He started 36 games during that span. He majored in communications.

== Professional career ==
=== Pre-draft ===
Pre-draft measurables
Height	Weight	Arm length	Hand span	40-yard dash	10-yard split	20-yard split	20-yard shuttle	Three-cone drill	Vertical jump	Broad jump	Bench press
6 ft 8 in (2.03 m)	316 lb (143 kg)	33 1/2 in (0.85 m)	10 1/8 in (0.26 m)	5.25 s	1.86 s	3.09 s	4.68 s	7.82 s	27.5 in (0.70 m)	8 ft 0 in (2.44 m)	20 reps
All values from NFL Combine

=== Tampa Bay Buccaneers ===
Trueblood was selected by the Tampa Bay Buccaneers in the second round of the 2006 NFL draft with the 59th overall pick.

=== Washington Redskins ===
Trueblood signed with the Washington Redskins on March 14, 2013. On August 27, 2013, the team terminated Trueblood's contract.

=== Atlanta Falcons ===
Trueblood signed with the Atlanta Falcons on September 3, 2013.
