= Ejiro Amos Tafiri =

Nigeria fashion designer

- Tafiri in 2016
- Born: Ejiro Amos-Tafiri; 26th of August
- Occupation: Fashion designer
- Known for: Fashion designing
- Children: 1

Ejiro Amos Tafiri is a Nigerian fashion designer. She is the originator of Ejiro Amos Tafiri (E.A.T) brand.

== Early life and career ==
Ejiro Amos-Tafiri was born in the city of Lagos. Her love for fashion started at the age of three through the influence of her grandmother who was then her tailor.

After elementary and high school, She went on to Yaba College of Technology where she studied Fashion Design and Clothing Technology even though she was expected to study medicine. She eventually graduated summa cum laude, obtaining a Distinction Grade as well as a Best Student award.

The Ejiro Amos Tafiri brand was launched in March 2010 after garnering experience from her internship stints and work experience at Out of Africa, Zizi Ethnic Clothing and Tiffany Amber where she honed her technical, creative and social skills, the garnered training proved invaluable.
