= J. C. Pearson =

American football player (born 1963)

No. 24
- Position: Cornerback

Personal information
- Born: August 17, 1963 (age 63); Oceanside, California, U.S.
- Listed height: 5 ft 11 in (1.80 m)
- Listed weight: 187 lb (85 kg)

Career information
- High school: El Camino (Oceanside, California)
- College: Washington
- NFL draft: 1985: undrafted

Career history
- Washington Redskins (1985)*; Kansas City Chiefs (1986–1992); Minnesota Vikings (1993)
- * Offseason or practice squad member only

Career NFL statistics
- Interceptions: 7
- Fumble recoveries: 1
- Sacks: 4
- Stats at Pro Football Reference

Jayice Pearson (born August 17, 1963) is an American former National Football League (NFL) defensive back.

== College career ==
Pearson played for the University of Washington.

== Professional career ==
Pearson played for the Kansas City Chiefs and Minnesota Vikings between 1986 and 1993.

== Sportscasting career ==
Pearson began broadcasting NFL games in 2003 after spending several years calling college football for ESPN Plus, often paired with Chris Marlowe on Mountain West Conference games. Pearson worked for Fox, calling games as a member of one of the lower tier broadcast teams. He eventually became a regular middle-tier broadcaster in 2005, working alongside Curt Menefee and later Matt Vasgersian.

Pearson left Fox following the 2008 season to return to ESPN to call college football games on ESPN2 and ESPN with Dave LaMont. In 2010, Pearson was an analyst for college football games on Fox Sports Net. On December 26, 2010, he was part of the Little Caesars Bowl game coverage between Florida International and Toledo.

Pearson was part of the afternoon radio show on 610 Sports in Kansas City called "The Drive" with Danny Parkins and Carrington Harrison from 2 p.m.-6 p.m. Central until 2015 when he left the show being replaced with Ben Heisler as producer.
