= Ejiro Kuale =

American gridiron football player (born 1983)

No. 1
- Position: Linebacker

Personal information
- Born: June 22, 1983 (age 43); Daytona Beach, Florida, U.S.
- Listed height: 6 ft 2 in (1.88 m)
- Listed weight: 238 lb (108 kg)

Career information
- College: Louisiana State
- NFL draft: 2006: undrafted

Career history
- New Orleans Saints (2006–2007)*; Kansas City Chiefs (2008)*; Calgary Stampeders (2009)*; Toronto Argonauts (2010–2012); Montreal Alouettes (2013); Saskatchewan Roughriders (2013); Winnipeg Blue Bombers (2014)
- * Offseason or practice squad member only

Awards and highlights
- Grey Cup champion (2012)
- Stats at CFL.ca (archive)

Ejiro "E. J." Megetaveh Kuale [kuh-WAL-ee] (born June 22, 1983) is an American former professional football linebacker. He was signed by the New Orleans Saints as an undrafted free agent in 2006. He played college football for the LSU Tigers.

Kuale was also a member of the Kansas City Chiefs, Calgary Stampeders, Toronto Argonauts, Montreal Alouettes, Saskatchewan Roughriders and Winnipeg Blue Bombers.

== Early life ==
Kuale was born in Daytona Beach, Florida. During his high school career he was a First-team selection to the 5A all-state team, all-Southeast, and helped lead Mainland High School in Daytona Beach to a District 4-5A title. As a senior, he had 120 tackles, 9.5 sacks, seven quarterback hurries and seven forced fumbles.

== College career ==
=== Georgia Tech ===
As a freshman in 2001 with Georgia Tech, Kuale played mainly on special teams. He was credited with special teams tackles against Clemson, Maryland and NC State. After the season Kuale decided to transfer to Dodge City Community College and sat out the 2002 season.

=== Dodge Community College ===
Kuale led the Kansas Jayhawk Community College Conference in tackles with 124 and three sacks. He was named Third-team All-Junior College and All-Conference.

=== Louisiana State ===
==== 2004 ====
Kuale transferred to Louisiana State and started two games for the Tigers. He started the season as the starter at strong side linebacker. He totaled 22 tackles, four tackles for a loss and two sacks. Against Ole Miss he totaled five tackles.

==== 2005 ====
After missing the first six games in the season with a broken ankle, Kuale debuted against North Texas on October 29. In the first few games after his return he played sparingly before playing most of the game against Arkansas. In the Arkansas game he recorded five tackles and then had another five tackles and a sack against Georgia in the SEC Championship Game. Against Miami in the Chick-fil-A Bowl he had one sack.

== Professional career ==
=== National Football League ===
In May 2006 after going undrafted in the 2006 NFL draft, Kuale signed with the New Orleans Saints. He was released before being re-signed before the 2007 season. In May 2008, Kuale signed with the Kansas City Chiefs. He was never able to make it on the field to play a down in the NFL.

=== Canadian Football League ===
Kuale signed with the Calgary Stampeders on May 7, 2009. He was released on June 25, 2009.

On February 22, 2010, Kuale signed with the Toronto Argonauts. For the 2010 CFL season, he ranked 3rd on the team in special teams tackles. In the playoffs, he was also employed as a part-time fullback and recorded one catch for 12 yards in Toronto's semi-final victory over the Hamilton Tiger-cats. Kuale played the 2011 and 2012 CFL seasons as a linebacker. In those two years he totaled 91 tackles. Kuale won the 100th Grey Cup at the close of the 2012 CFL season. On December 4, 2012 The Toronto Argonauts released Kuale.

Kuale signed with the Montreal Alouettes on February 25, 2013. Kuale played in only four games with the Alouettes before being released on August 10, 2013. In those four games he recorded four tackles and one special teams tackle.

Kuale signed with the Saskatchewan Roughriders to a practice roster deal on September 18, 2013. He was released on April 29, 2014.
