= T. J. Williams (American football) =

American football player (born 1982)

T.J. Williams
Profile
- Position: Tight end

Personal information
- Born: September 24, 1982 (age 44); Tarboro, North Carolina, U.S.
- Listed height: 6 ft 2 in (1.88 m)
- Listed weight: 253 lb (115 kg)

Career information
- High school: Hargrave Military (Chatham, Virginia)
- College: NC State
- NFL draft: 2006: 6th round, 202nd overall pick

Career history
- Tampa Bay Buccaneers (2006)

Awards and highlights
- Second-team All-ACC (2005)

T. J. Williams (born September 24, 1982) is an American football tight end. He played high school football at Tarboro High School and Hargrave Military Academy and played college football for North Carolina State University, where he was the leading receiver in 2004 and in 2005. He was named second-team All-ACC in 2005.

== Professional career ==
Pre-draft measurables
Height	Weight	Arm length	Hand span	40-yard dash	10-yard split	20-yard split	20-yard shuttle	Three-cone drill	Vertical jump	Broad jump	Bench press
6 ft 2 3/8 in (1.89 m)	269 lb (122 kg)	33 7/8 in (0.86 m)	9 3/4 in (0.25 m)	4.75 s	1.66 s	2.75 s	4.54 s	7.49 s	34.0 in (0.86 m)	9 ft 3 in (2.82 m)	25 reps
All values from NFL Combine

Williams was selected with the 1st Compensatory Selection in the sixth round, and 33rd in the sixth round of the 2006 NFL draft by the Tampa Bay Buccaneers.

Williams was released by the Buccaneers on July 26, 2007.
