= 2007 Atlanta Falcons season =

NFL team season

- Owner: Arthur Blank
- General manager: Rich McKay
- Head coach: Bobby Petrino (resigned December 10; 3–10 record); Emmitt Thomas (interim; 1–2 record)
- Home stadium: Georgia Dome

Results
- Record: 4–12
- Division place: 4th NFC South
- Playoffs: Did not qualify
- Pro Bowlers: None

The 2007 Atlanta Falcons season was the 42nd season for the franchise in the National Football League (NFL). They finished the 2007 season with a record of 4–12 and failed to improve upon their 7–9 record in 2006 after finishing third place in the NFC South.

The season was marred with the Falcons' starting quarterback Michael Vick getting indicted on federal and state charges over his involvement in an illegal dog fighting ring. New head coach Bobby Petrino was initially hired to help develop Vick into a more complete quarterback and improve the Falcons' languid offense (ranked 25th in scoring) from the previous season, but with Vick's absence and longtime dependable backup quarterback Matt Schaub traded to the Houston Texans before Vick's indictment, Petrino was instead forced to rely on journeyman quarterbacks Joey Harrington, Byron Leftwich and Chris Redman for the offense. Petrino's game plan did not fit, both on the field and in the locker room, with veteran players Alge Crumpler and DeAngelo Hall voicing their displeasure.

Petrino later resigned just 13 games into the season to coach the Arkansas Razorbacks. Petrino resigned the day after Michael Vick was sentenced to 23 months in prison and also a day after Petrino coached the Falcons in a 34–14 loss to the New Orleans Saints on Monday Night Football. He did not address his players in person, only leaving a hand-written note. This was the final season Morten Andersen would play in the NFL.

== Offseason ==
=== Head coach change ===
Head coach Bobby Petrino spent less than a year with the Atlanta Falcons. He was hired on January 7, 2007 after the Falcons fired Jim Mora, Jr., who was fired on New Year's Day. On December 11, 2007, Petrino announced his resignation just 13 games into his first year.

=== Departures ===
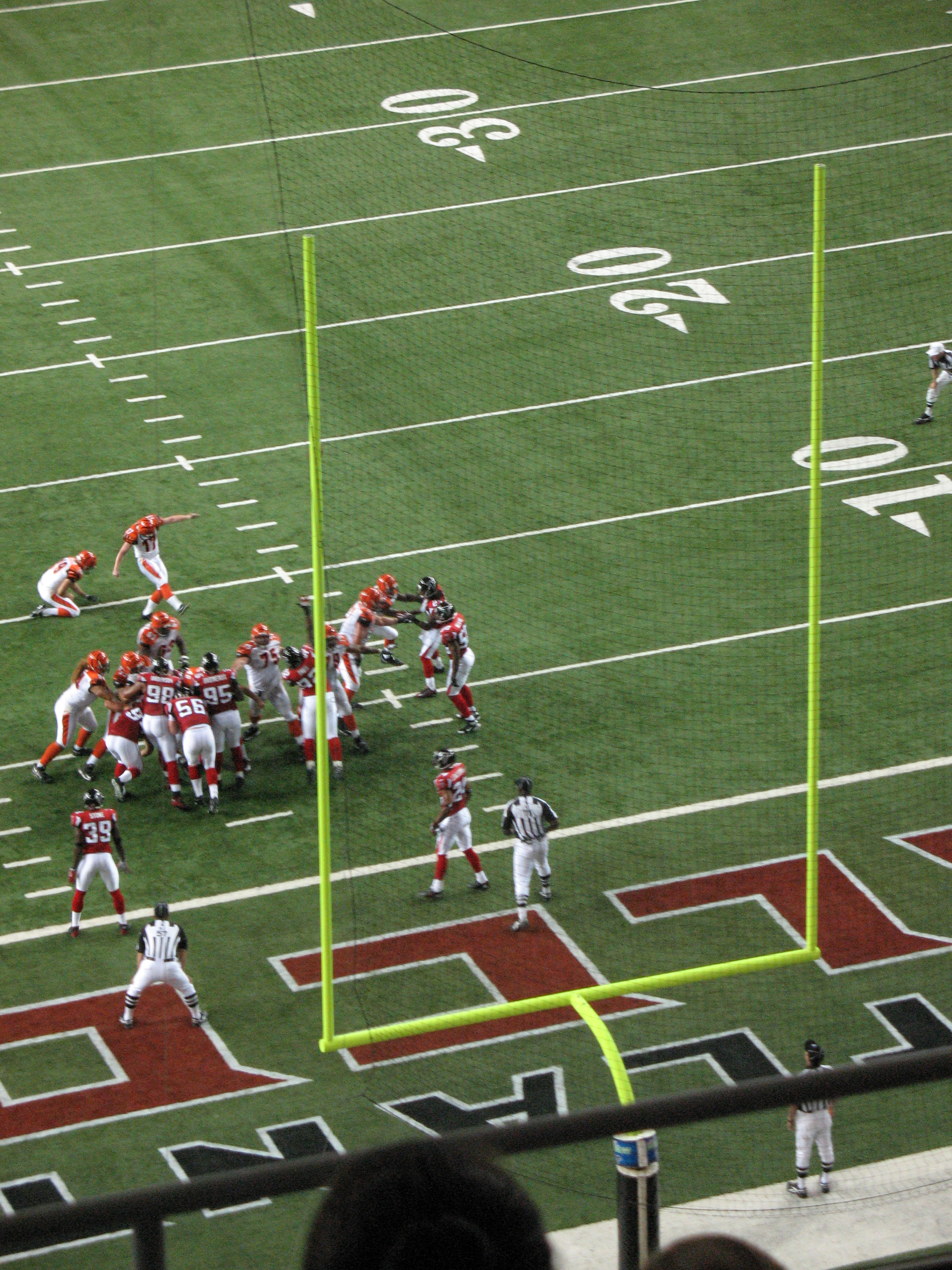
The Falcons in action against the Cincinnati Bengals in the preseason, August 27, 2007, at the Georgia Dome

- On March 2, the Falcons released linebackers Edgerton Hartwell and Ike Reese.
- On March 5, the Falcons released guard Matt Lehr and long-snapper Gavin Tarquinio.
- On March 6, wide receiver Ashley Lelie signed a contract with the San Francisco 49ers.
- On March 7, defensive end Patrick Kerney signed a contract with the Seattle Seahawks.
- On March 8, the Falcons traded quarterback Matt Schaub to the Houston Texans along with their 2007 first round pick (10th overall) in exchange for the Texans' first round pick (8th overall), a 2007 second round pick and a 2008 second round pick.
- On March 9, fullback Justin Griffith signed a contract with the Oakland Raiders.

=== Signings ===
- On March 2, the Falcons signed fullback Ovie Mughelli, formerly with the Baltimore Ravens, to a contract.
- On March 3, the Falcons signed linebacker Marcus Wilkins, formerly with the Cincinnati Bengals, to a contract.
- On March 7, the Falcons signed cornerback Lewis Sanders, formerly with the Houston Texans, to a contract.
- On March 8, the Falcons signed wide receiver Joe Horn, formerly with the New Orleans Saints, to a contract.
- On March 15, the Falcons signed guard Toniu Fonoti, formerly with the Miami Dolphins, to a contract.
- On March 15, the Falcons signed wide receiver Derrick Hamilton, formerly with the San Francisco 49ers, to a contract.
- On March 22, the Falcons signed kicker Aaron Elling, formerly with the Baltimore Ravens, to a contract.
- On March 23, the Falcons signed quarterback Chris Redman to a contract.
- On April 9, the Falcons signed quarterback Joey Harrington, formerly with the Miami Dolphins, to a contract.
- On May 4, the Falcons signed kicker Billy Cundiff to a contract.
- On May 9, the Falcons signed tackle Leander Jordan, formerly with the San Diego Chargers, to a contract.

=== Free agents heading into the 2007 season ===
Position	Player	Free agency tag	Date signed	2007 team
K	Morten Andersen	UFA		
TE	Dwayne Blakley	RFA	April 4	
CB	Chris Cash	UFA		
G	Ben Claxton	ERFA		
FB	Justin Griffith	UFA	March 9	Oakland Raiders
DE	Patrick Kerney	UFA	March 7	Seattle Seahawks
C	Austin King	RFA		
P	Michael Koenen	ERFA	March 19	Atlanta Falcons
WR	Ashley Lelie	UFA	March 6	San Francisco 49ers
FB	Fred McCrary	UFA		
FB	Corey McIntyre	ERFA	March 19	Atlanta Falcons
QB	Matt Schaub	RFA	March 22	Houston Texans
S	Lance Schulters	UFA		
LB	Demorrio Williams	RFA	April 23	Atlanta Falcons

=== NFL draft ===
2007 Atlanta Falcons draft
Round	Pick	Player	Position	College	Notes
1	8	Jamaal Anderson	Defensive end	Arkansas	from Houston
2	39	Justin Blalock	Guard	Texas	from Houston
2	41	Chris Houston	Cornerback	Arkansas	from Minnesota
3	75	Laurent Robinson	Wide receiver	Illinois State	
4	109	Stephen Nicholas	Linebacker	South Florida	Compensatory selection
4	133	Martrez Milner	Tight end	Georgia	
6	185	Trey Lewis	Defensive tackle	Washburn	from Jacksonville
6	194	David Irons	Cornerback	Auburn	from Jacksonville, thru Denver
6	198	Doug Datish	Center	Ohio State	from Jacksonville, thru Baltimore
6	203	Daren Stone	Safety	Maine	
7	244	Jason Snelling	Running back	Virginia	Compensatory selection
Made roster

== Staff ==
2007 Atlanta Falcons staff
Front office: Owner/chief executive officer – Arthur Blank; President/general manager – Rich McKay; Assistant general manager – Billy Devaney; Director of pro personnel – Les Snead; Director of college scouting – Phil Emery; Head coaches: Head coach – Bobby Petrino; Interim head coach/defensive backs – Emmitt Thomas; Offensive coaches: Offensive coordinator – Hue Jackson; Quarterbacks – Bill Musgrave; Running backs – Ollie Wilson; Wide receivers – Paul Petrino; Tight ends – Keith Rowen; Offensive line – Mike Summers; Offensive assistant/quality control – Derrick Nix; Offensive assistant – Andy Sugarman	Defensive coaches: Defensive coordinator – Mike Zimmer; Defensive line – Kevin Wolthausen; Linebackers – Brian VanGorder; Assistant defensive backs – Joe Whitt Jr.; Defensive assistant/quality control – Jonathan Gannon; Special teams coaches: Special teams coordinator – Jerry Rosburg; Assistant special teams – Tom McMahon; Strength and conditioning: Head strength and conditioning – Evan Marcus; Assistant strength and conditioning – Billy Johnson; Assistant strength and conditioning – Dave Puloka

== Roster ==
2007 Atlanta Falcons roster
Quarterbacks (QB): 13 Joey Harrington; 4 Byron Leftwich; 8 Chris Redman; Running backs (RB): 28 Warrick Dunn; 38 Corey McIntyre FB; 34 Ovie Mughelli FB; 32 Jerious Norwood; 44 Jason Snelling; Wide receivers (WR): 87 Joe Horn; 12 Michael Jenkins; 81 Adam Jennings; 19 Laurent Robinson; 14 Eric Weems; 84 Roddy White; Tight ends (TE): 80 Courtney Anderson; 85 Dwayne Blakley; 83 Alge Crumpler	Offensive linemen (OL): 70 D'Anthony Batiste G; 63 Justin Blalock G; 77 Tyson Clabo T; 73 Harvey Dahl T; 65 Kynan Forney G; 62 Todd McClure C; 64 Pat McCoy T; 76 Quinn Ojinnaka G/T; 71 Kurt Quarterman G; 67 Ben Wilkerson C; Defensive linemen (DL): 55 John Abraham DE; 98 Jamaal Anderson DE; 93 Tim Anderson DT; 95 Jonathan Babineaux DT; 92 Chauncey Davis DE; 99 Derrick Jones DE; 96 Montavious Stanley DT	Linebackers (LB): 59 Michael Boley OLB; 56 Keith Brooking MLB; 54 Stephen Nicholas OLB; 53 Tony Taylor MLB; 50 Marcus Wilkins OLB; 51 Demorrio Williams OLB; 52 Travis Williams OLB; Defensive backs (DB): 25 Chris Crocker FS; 43 Brent Grimes CB; 21 DeAngelo Hall CB; 41 Antoine Harris CB/S; 23 Chris Houston CB; 30 David Irons CB; 36 Lawyer Milloy SS; 39 Daren Stone SS; 24 Jimmy Williams FS; Special teams (ST): 5 Morten Andersen K; 9 Michael Koenen P; 46 Mike Schneck LS	Practice squad: 48 George Cooper TE; 47 Earl Everett LB; 22 C. J. Gaddis S; 94 Kevin Huntley DE; 49 Cameron Vaughn LB; 82 Todd Watkins WR; Reserve: 75 Rod Coleman DT (IR); 61 Doug Datish C (IR); 18 Jamin Elliott WR (IR); 86 Brian Finneran WR (IR); 79 Renardo Foster T (IR); 72 Wayne Gandy T (IR); 97 Trey Lewis DT (IR); 26 Omare Lowe CB/S (IR); 88 Martrez Milner TE (IR); -- David Patterson DT (IR); 66 Terrance Pennington T (IR); 29 Lewis Sanders CB (IR); 3 D. J. Shockley QB (IR); 7 Michael Vick QB (Susp.); 74 Todd Weiner T (IR); Rookies in italics 53 active, 15 reserve, 6 practice squad

== Preseason ==
Week	Date	Opponent	Result	Record	Venue	Recap
1	August 10	at New York Jets	L 16–31	0–1	Giants Stadium	Recap
2	August 17	at Buffalo Bills	W 13–10	1–1	Ralph Wilson Stadium	Recap
3	August 27	Cincinnati Bengals	W 24–19	2–1	Georgia Dome	Recap
4	August 31	Baltimore Ravens	W 13–10	3–1	Georgia Dome	Recap

== Regular season ==
=== Schedule ===
Week	Date	Opponent	Result	Record	Venue	Recap
1	September 9	at Minnesota Vikings	L 3–24	0–1	Hubert H. Humphrey Metrodome	Recap
2	September 16	at Jacksonville Jaguars	L 7–13	0–2	Jacksonville Municipal Stadium	Recap
3	September 23	Carolina Panthers	L 20–27	0–3	Georgia Dome	Recap
4	September 30	Houston Texans	W 26–16	1–3	Georgia Dome	Recap
5	October 7	at Tennessee Titans	L 13–20	1–4	LP Field	Recap
6	October 15	New York Giants	L 10–31	1–5	Georgia Dome	Recap
7	October 21	at New Orleans Saints	L 16–22	1–6	Superdome	Recap
8	Bye					
9	November 4	San Francisco 49ers	W 20–16	2–6	Georgia Dome	Recap
10	November 11	at Carolina Panthers	W 20–13	3–6	Bank of America Stadium	Recap
11	November 18	Tampa Bay Buccaneers	L 7–31	3–7	Georgia Dome	Recap
12	November 22	Indianapolis Colts	L 13–31	3–8	Georgia Dome	Recap
13	December 2	at St. Louis Rams	L 16–28	3–9	Edward Jones Dome	Recap
14	December 10	New Orleans Saints	L 14–34	3–10	Georgia Dome	Recap
15	December 16	at Tampa Bay Buccaneers	L 3–37	3–11	Raymond James Stadium	Recap
16	December 23	at Arizona Cardinals	L 27–30 (OT)	3–12	University of Phoenix Stadium	Recap
17	December 30	Seattle Seahawks	W 44–41	4–12	Georgia Dome	Recap

=== Game summaries ===
==== Week 1: at Minnesota Vikings ====
Quarter	1	2	3	4	Total
Falcons	0	0	0	3	3
Vikings	7	0	3	14	24

at Hubert H. Humphrey Metrodome, Minneapolis, Minnesota

- Game time: 1:00 p.m. EDT
- TV announcers (Fox): Ron Pitts (play-by-play) and Tony Boselli (color commentator)

Game information
- Q1 – MIN – 7:56 – Kevin Williams 54-yard interception return TD (Ryan Longwell kick) (MIN 7–0)
- Q3 – MIN – 1:51 – Ryan Longwell 49-yard FG (MIN 10–0)
- Q4 – ATL – 9:28 – Matt Prater 45-yard FG (MIN 10–3)
- Q4 – MIN – 7:31 – 60-yard TD pass from Tarvaris Jackson to Adrian Peterson (Longwell kick) (MIN 17–3)
- Q4 – MIN – 2:48 – Antoine Winfield 14-yard interception return TD (Longwell kick) (MIN 24–3)

Hoping to put a troublesome off-season behind them, the Falcons began their 2007 campaign on the road against the Minnesota Vikings. In the first quarter, Atlanta immediately trailed as Vikings DT Kevin Williams returned an interception 54 yards for a touchdown, which was the only score of the half. In the third quarter, Minnesota increased its lead with kicker Ryan Longwell getting a 49-yard field goal. In the fourth quarter, the Falcons got their only score of the game, with kicker Matt Prater's 45-yard field goal. From there, the Vikings put the game away with QB Tarvaris Jackson completing a 60-yard TD pass to RB Adrian Peterson, along with CB Antoine Winfield returning an interception 14 yards for a touchdown.

QB Joey Harrington, in his Falcons debut, completed 23 out of 32 passes for 199 yards with no touchdowns and 2 interceptions.

With the loss, Atlanta began its season at 0–1.

==== Week 2: at Jacksonville Jaguars ====
Quarter	1	2	3	4	Total
Falcons	0	7	0	0	7
Jaguars	0	3	0	10	13

at Jacksonville Municipal Stadium, Jacksonville, Florida

- Game time: 1:00 p.m. EDT
- Game weather: 88 °F (31.1 °C), rainy
- Game attendance: 61,821
- Referee: Tony Corrente
- TV announcers (Fox): Ron Pitts (play-by-play) and Tony Boselli (color commentator)

Game information
- Q2 – JAC – 13:30 – John Carney 35-yard FG (JAC 3–0)
- Q2 – ATL – 1:51 – Warrick Dunn 4-yard TD run (Matt Prater kick) (ATL 7–3)
- Q4 – JAC – 14:10 – 45-yard TD pass from David Garrard to Reggie Williams (Carney kick) (JAC 10–7)
- Q4 – JAC – 3:39 – Carney 27-yard FG (JAC 13–7)

Trying to rebound from their road loss to the Vikings, the Falcons went to Jacksonville Municipal Stadium for a Week 2 interconference fight with the Jacksonville Jaguars. After a scoreless first quarter, Atlanta trailed early as Jaguars kicker John Carney got a 35-yard field goal. Afterwards, the Falcons had their only score of the game as RB Warrick Dunn got a 4-yard TD run. After a scoreless third quarter, Jacksonville sealed the win with QB David Garrard's 14-yard TD pass to WR Reggie Williams and Carney's 27-yard field goal.

With the loss, the Falcons fell to 0–2.

==== Week 3: vs. Carolina Panthers ====
Quarter	1	2	3	4	Total
Panthers	0	10	14	3	27
Falcons	0	10	7	3	20

at Georgia Dome, Atlanta, Georgia

- Game time: 4:15 p.m. EDT
- Game weather: Game played indoors (Domed stadium)
- Game attendance: 68,175
- Referee: Larry Nemmers
- TV announcers (Fox): Ron Pitts (play-by-play) and Tony Boselli (color commentator)

Game information
- Q2 – CAR – 10:53 – John Kasay 45-yard FG (CAR 3–0)
- Q2 – ATL – 9:19 – 69-yard TD pass from Joey Harrington to Roddy White (Andersen kick) (ATL 7–3)
- Q2 – CAR – 4:32 – 13-yard TD pass from Jake Delhomme to DeShaun Foster (Kasay kick) (CAR 10–7)
- Q2 – ATL – 0:11 – Morten Andersen 24-yard FG (10–10)
- Q3 – ATL – 9:09 – 13 yd TD pass from Joey Harrington to Alge Crumpler (Andersen kick) (ATL 17–10)
- Q3 – CAR – 7:13 – 5 yd TD pass from Jake Delhomme to Jeff King (Kasay kick) (17–17)
- Q3 – CAR – 0:47 – DeShaun Foster 10-yard TD run (Kasay kick) (CAR 24–17)
- Q4 – CAR – 7:36 – John Kasay 49-yard FG (CAR 27–17)
- Q4 – ATL – 3:03 – Morten Andersen 25-yard FG (CAR 27–20)

Trying to avoid their first 0–3 start since 1999, the Falcons played their Week 3 home opener against their divisional rival, the Carolina Panthers. After a scoreless first quarter, Atlanta trailed early as Panthers kicker John Kasay got a 45-yard field goal. Afterwards, the Falcons took the lead with QB Joey Harrington completing a 69-yard TD pass to WR Roddy White. However, Carolina retook the lead with QB Jake Delhomme completing a 13-yard TD pass to RB DeShaun Foster. Atlanta tied the game prior to halftime with kicker Morten Andersen getting a 24-yard field goal.

In the third quarter, the Falcons regained the lead with Harrington completing a 13-yard TD pass to TE Alge Crumpler, yet the Panthers regained the lead with Delhomme completing a 5-yard TD pass to TE Jeff King, along with Foster's 10-yard TD run. In the fourth quarter, Carolina ended its scoring with Kasay kicking a 49-yard field goal. Atlanta tried to mount a comeback, yet the only score was Andersen's 25-yard field goal.

With the loss, the Falcons fell to 0–3.

==== Week 4: vs. Houston Texans ====
Quarter	1	2	3	4	Total
Texans	7	3	3	3	16
Falcons	10	10	3	3	26

at Georgia Dome, Atlanta, Georgia

- Game time: 1:00 p.m. EDT
- Game weather: Game played indoors (Domed stadium)
- Game attendance: 69,312
- Referee: Gerry Austin
- TV announcers (CBS): Don Criqui (play-by-play) and Steve Beuerlein (color commentator)

Game information
- Q1 – ATL – 8:14 – Morten Andersen 28-yard FG (ATL 3–0)
- Q1 – HOU – 5:34 – 35-yard TD pass from Matt Schaub to André Davis (Brown kick) (HOU 7–3)
- Q1 – ATL – 1:13 – 5-yard TD pass from Joey Harrington to Michael Jenkins (Andersen kick) (ATL 10–7)
- Q2 – ATL – 8:22 – 7-yard TD pass from Joey Harrington to Michael Jenkins (Andersen kick) (ATL 17–7)
- Q2 – ATL – 1:52 – Morten Andersen 22-yard FG (ATL 20–7)
- Q2 – HOU – 0:05 – Kris Brown 42-yard FG (ATL 20–10)
- Q3 – HOU – 10:13 – Kris Brown 37-yard FG (ATL 20–13)
- Q3 – ATL – 4:00 – Morten Andersen 36-yard FG (ATL 23–13)
- Q4 – HOU – 14:52 – Kris Brown 19-yard FG (ATL 23–16)
- Q4 – ATL – 8:16 – Morten Andersen 46-yard FG (ATL 26–16)

Still searching for their first win of the year, the Falcons stayed at home for an interconference duel with the Houston Texans, featuring a former teammate in QB Matt Schaub. In the first quarter, Atlanta delivered the first punch with kicker Morten Andersen getting a 28-yard field goal. However, the Texans took the lead with Schaub completing a 35-yard TD pass to WR André Davis. The Falcons regained the lead with QB Joey Harrington completing a 5-yard TD pass to WR Michael Jenkins. In the second quarter, Harrington and Jenkins hooked up with each other again on a 7-yard TD pass. Also, Andersen contributed to Atlanta's cause by kicking a 22-yard field goal. Houston ended the half with kicker Kris Brown getting a 42-yard field goal.

In the third quarter, the Texans drew close with Brown kicking a 37-yard field goal. The Falcons responded with Andersen getting a 36-yard field goal. In the fourth quarter, Houston tried to retaliate with Brown kicking a 19-yard field goal. Again, Atlanta answered with Andersen nailing a 46-yard field goal. Afterwards, the Falcons held on to give head coach Bobby Petrino his first NFL victory.

With the win, the Falcons snapped a six-game losing skid and improved to 1–3.

==== Week 5: at Tennessee Titans ====
Quarter	1	2	3	4	Total
Falcons	7	3	3	0	13
Titans	7	3	10	0	20

at LP Field, Nashville, Tennessee

- Game time: 1:00 p.m. EDT
- Game weather: 84 °F or 28.9 °C (sunny)
- Game attendance: 69,143
- Referee: Jerome Boger
- TV announcers (Fox): Ron Pitts (play-by-play) and Tony Boselli (color commentator)

Game information
- Q1 – ATL – 10:00 – DeAngelo Hall 56-yard TD fumble return (Andersen kick) (ATL 7–0)
- Q1 – TEN – 6:15 – Chris Brown (Bironas kick) (7–7)
- Q2 – ATL – 11:15 – Morten Andersen 32-yard FG (ATL 10–7)
- Q2 – TEN – 0:00 – Rob Bironas 30-yard FG (10–10)
- Q3 – ATL – 10:08 – Morten Andersen 28-yard FG (ATL 13–10)
- Q3 – TEN – 6:56 – Rob Bironas 40-yard FG (13–13)
- Q3 – TEN – 1:00 – Vincent Fuller 76-yard TD interception return (Bironas kick) (TEN 20–13)

Coming off their home win over the Texans, the Falcons flew to LP Field for a Week 5 interconference duel with the Tennessee Titans. In the first quarter, Atlanta got off to a fast start as CB DeAngelo Hall returned a LenDale White fumble 56 yards for a touchdown. The Titans tied the game with RB Chris Brown getting a 3-yard TD run. In the second quarter, the Falcons regained the lead with kicker Morten Andersen getting a 32-yard field goal. Tennessee ended the half with kicker Rob Bironas getting a 30-yard field goal.

In the third quarter, Atlanta got their lead back with Andersen kicking a 28-yard field goal. However, the Titans took the lead with Bironas nailing a 40-yard field goal, along with DB Vincent Fuller intercepting QB Joey Harrington and returning it 76 yards for a touchdown. In the fourth quarter, with Harrington being ineffective (16/31 for 87 yards and 1 interception), back-up QB Byron Leftwich came to try to lead the Falcons to victory. Near the end of the game, Atlanta came close (at Tennessee's 1-yard line). On four-straight plays, they were held out of the end zone, with Albert Haynesworth making a leaping tackle of Warrick Dunn in the backfield after hurdling an offensive lineman.

With the loss, not only did the Falcons fall to 1–4, but it also marked their fifth straight loss to the Titans.

==== Week 6: vs New York Giants ====
Quarter	1	2	3	4	Total
Giants	14	7	0	10	31
Falcons	10	0	0	0	10

at Georgia Dome, Atlanta, Georgia

- Game time: 8:30 p.m. EDT
- Game weather: Game played indoors (Domed stadium)
- Game attendance: 69,828
- Referee: Bill Leavy
- TV announcers (ESPN): Mike Tirico (play-by-play), Tony Kornheiser (color commentator) and Ron Jaworski (color commentator)

Game information
- Q1 – ATL – 11:47 – Morten Andersen 47-yard FG (ATL 3–0)
- Q1 – NYG – 5:32 – Amani Toomer 5 yd TD pass from Eli Manning (Tynes kick) (NYG 7–3)
- Q1 – ATL – 5:14 – Jerious Norwood 67-yard TD run (Andersen kick) (ATL 10–7)
- Q1 – NYG – 2:13 – Reuben Droughns 1-yard TD run (NYG 14–10)
- Q2 – NYG – 8:21 – Plaxico Burress 43-yard TD pass from Manning (NYG 21–10)
- Q4 – NYG – 10:52 – Lawrence Tynes 32-yard FG (NYG 24–10)
- Q4 – NYG – 3:08 – Derrick Ward 9-yard TD run (Tynes kick) (NYG 31–10)

Hoping to rebound from their road loss to the Titans, the Falcons came home for Monday Night Football has they hosted the New York Giants. In the first quarter, Atlanta took flight early as kicker Morten Andersen got a 47-yard field goal. However, the Giants responded with QB Eli Manning completing a 5-yard TD pass to WR Amani Toomer. The Falcons answered with RB Jerious Norwood getting a 67-yard TD run. Afterwards, New York replied with RB Reuben Droughns getting a 1-yard TD run. In the second quarter, Atlanta's struggles continued as Manning completed a 43-yard TD pass to WR Plaxico Burress to increase the Giants' lead. After a scoreless third quarter, New York sealed the win with kicker Lawrence Tynes nailing a 32-yard field goal, while RB Derrick Ward got a 9-yard TD run.

With their second-straight loss, the Falcons fell to 1–5.

==== Week 7: at New Orleans Saints ====
Quarter	1	2	3	4	Total
Falcons	3	10	0	3	16
Saints	7	0	7	8	22

at Louisiana Superdome, New Orleans, Louisiana

- Game time: 1:00 p.m. EDT
- Game weather: Game played indoors (Domed stadium)
- Game attendance: 69,994
- Referee: Walt Anderson
- TV announcers (Fox): Chris Rose (play-by-play) and Terry Donahue (color commentator)

Game information
- Q1 – NO – 7:16 – Devery Henderson 37-yard TD pass from Drew Brees (Mare kick) (NO 7-0)
- Q1 – ATL – 6:15 – Morten Andersen 38-yard FG (NO 7–3)
- Q2 – ATL – 10:21 – Morten Andersen 33-yard FG (NO 7–6)
- Q2 – ATL – 3:31 – Roddy White 9-yard TD pass from Byron Leftwich (Andersen kick) (ATL 13–7)
- Q3 – NO – 10:15 – Pierre Thomas 24-yard TD run (Mare kick) (NO 14–13)
- Q4 – ATL – 10:19 – Morten Andersen 21-yard FG (ATL 16–14)
- Q4 – NO – 5:04 – Reggie Bush 4-yard TD pass from Brees (Bush run) (NO 22–16)

Trying to snap a two-game skid, the Falcons flew to the Louisiana Superdome for a Week 7 divisional duel with the New Orleans Saints. Due to QB Joey Harrington's ineffectiveness from last week's loss to the Giants, QB Byron Leftwich was given the start.

In the first quarter, Atlanta trailed early as Saints QB Drew Brees completed a 37-yard TD pass to WR Devery Henderson. The Falcons responded with former Saints kicker Morten Andersen's 38-yard field goal. In the second quarter, Atlanta began to play well as Andersen got a 33-yard field goal, while Leftwich completed a 9-yard TD pass to WR Roddy White.

In the third quarter, New Orleans retook the lead with RB Pierre Thomas getting a 24-yard TD run. On the Falcons' next possession, Leftwich's left leg got injured during a sack by Saints DE Will Smith. Harrington took over for the rest of the game. In the fourth quarter, Andersen gave Atlanta a 21-yard field goal. The Saints sealed the win with Brees hooking up with RB Reggie Bush on a 4-yard TD pass, along with Bush's 2-point conversion run.

With their third-straight loss, the Falcons entered their bye week at 1–6.

==== Week 9: vs. San Francisco 49ers ====
Quarter	1	2	3	4	Total
49ers	7	0	6	3	16
Falcons	7	7	0	6	20

at Georgia Dome, Atlanta, Georgia

- Game time: 1:00 p.m. EST
- Game weather: Game played indoors (Domed stadium)
- Game attendance: 66,049
- Referee: Bill Carollo
- TV announcers (Fox): Matt Vasgersian (play-by-play) and J.C. Pearson (color commentator)

Game information
- Q1 – SF – 9:10 – Maurice Hicks 37-yard TD run (Joe Nedney kick) (SF 7–0)
- Q1 – ATL – 4:49 – Warrick Dunn 9-yard TD run (Morten Andersen kick) (7–7)
- Q2 – ATL – 3:48 – Ovie Mughelli 1-yard TD run (ATL 14–7)
- Q3 – SF – 12:08 – Joe Nedney 49-yard FG (ATL 14–10)
- Q3 – SF – 7:54 – Joe Nedney 32-yard FG (ATL 14–13)
- Q4 – ATL – 10:19 – Morten Andersen 33-yard FG (ATL 17–13)
- Q4 – NO – 7:56 – Joe Nedney 22-yard FG (ATL 17–16)
- Q4 – ATL – 1:10 – Morten Andersen 27-yard FG (ATL 20–16)

Trying to snap a three-game skid, the Falcons went home and played a Week 9 intraconference duel with the San Francisco 49ers. In the first quarter, Atlanta trailed early as 49ers RB Maurice Hicks got a 9-yard TD run. The Falcons responded with RB Warrick Dunn getting a 9-yard TD run. In the second quarter, Atlanta increased its lead with RB Ovie Mughelli getting a 1-yard TD run for the only score of the period.

In the third quarter, San Francisco crept close as kicker Joe Nedney got a 49-yard and a 32-yard field goal. Fortunately, in the fourth quarter, the Falcons answered with kicker Morten Andersen getting a 33-yard field goal. The 49ers responded with Nedney kicking a 22-yard field goal, yet Atlanta got the win with Andersen nailing a 27-yard field goal.

With the win, the Falcons improved to 2–6.

The struggling Falcons rushing attack had its best performance (to date) with 155 total rushing yards.

==== Week 10: at Carolina Panthers ====
Quarter	1	2	3	4	Total
Falcons	7	0	3	10	20
Panthers	0	10	0	3	13

at Bank of America Stadium, Charlotte, North Carolina

- Game time: 1:00 p.m. EST
- Game weather: 63 °F or 17.2 °C (Sunny)
- Game attendance: 73,340
- Referee: Terry McAulay
- TV announcers (Fox): Chris Rose (play-by-play) and Terry Donahue (color commentator)

Game information
- Q1 – ATL – 8:43 – Warrick Dunn 30-yard TD run (Morten Andersen kick) (7–0 ATL)
- Q2 – CAR – 4:20 – Ken Lucas 27-yard TD fumble return (John Kasay kick) (7–7)
- Q2 – CAR – 0:00 – John Kasay 29-yard FG (CAR 10–7)
- Q3 – ATL – 3:24 – Morten Andersen 36-yard FG (10–10)
- Q4 – ATL – 11:35 – Morten Andersen 47-yard FG (ATL 13–10)
- Q4 – CAR – 7:56 – John Kasay 31-yard FG (13–13)
- Q4 – ATL – 0:20 – Alge Crumpler 30-yard TD pass from Joey Harrington (20–13)

Coming off their home win over the 49ers, the Falcons flew to Bank of America Stadium for an NFC South rematch with the Carolina Panthers. In the first quarter, Atlanta took flight as RB Warrick Dunn got a 30-yard TD run for the only score of the period. In the second quarter, the Panthers took the lead as CB Ken Lucas returned a fumble 27 yards for a touchdown, while kicker John Kasay managed to get a 29-yard field goal.

In the third quarter, the Falcons tied the game with kicker Morten Andersen getting a 36-yard field goal for the only score of the period. In the fourth quarter, Atlanta took the lead with Andersen kicking a 47-yard field goal. Carolina tied the game with Kasay nailing a 31-yard field goal. Fortunately, the Falcons got the win with QB Joey Harrington completing a 30-yard TD pass to TE Alge Crumpler.

With the win, Atlanta improved to 3–6.

==== Week 11: vs. Tampa Bay Buccaneers ====
Quarter	1	2	3	4	Total
Buccaneers	7	7	10	7	31
Falcons	0	0	0	7	7

at Georgia Dome, Atlanta, Georgia

- Game time: 1:00 p.m. EST
- Game weather: Game played indoors (Domed stadium)
- Game attendance: 69,480
- Referee: Walt Coleman
- TV announcers (Fox): Ron Pitts (play-by-play) & Tony Boselli (color commentator)

Game information
- Q1 – TB – 7:43 – Joey Galloway 44-yard TD pass from Jeff Garcia (Matt Bryant kick) (7–0 TB)
- Q2 – TB – 10:42 – Ronde Barber 41-yard TD fumble return (Bryant kick) (TB 14–0)
- Q3 – TB – 6:35 – Matt Bryant 23-yard FG (TB 17–0)
- Q3 – TB – 4:51 – Alex Smith 21-yard TD pass from Jeff Garcia (Bryant kick) (TB 24–0)
- Q4 – TB – 14:53 – Earnest Graham 26-yard TD run (Bryant kick) (TB 31–0)
- Q4 – ATL – 1:10 – Adam Jennings 7-yard TD pass from Joey Harrington (Morten Andersen kick) (TB 31–7)

Coming off their divisional road win over the Panthers, the Falcons went home a Week 11 divisional duel with the Tampa Bay Buccaneers. Despite QB Joey Harrington giving Atlanta two-straight wins, QB Byron Leftwich was given the start.

In the first quarter, the Falcons trailed early as Buccaneers QB Jeff Garcia completed a 44-yard TD pass to WR Joey Galloway for the only score of the period. In the second quarter, Atlanta continued to trail as Tampa Bay CB Ronde Barber returned a fumble 41 yards for a touchdown. In the third quarter, the Buccaneers continued their beatdown with kicker Matt Bryant nailing a 23-yard field goal, while Garcia completed a 21-yard TD pass to TE Alex Smith. In the fourth quarter, Tampa Bay sealed the win with RB Earnest Graham getting a 26-yard TD run. The Falcons avoided the shutout as Harrington came onto the field and completed a 7-yard TD pass to WR Adam Jennings.

With the loss, Atlanta fell to 3–7.

==== Week 12: vs. Indianapolis Colts ====
Quarter	1	2	3	4	Total
Colts	0	21	10	0	31
Falcons	10	3	0	0	13

at Georgia Dome, Atlanta, Georgia

- Game time: 8:15 p.m. EST
- Game weather: Game played indoors (domed stadium)
- Game attendance: 69,845
- Referee: Mike Carey
- TV announcers (NFL Network): Bryant Gumbel (play-by-play) and Cris Collinsworth (color commentator)

Game information
- Q1 – ATL – 6:59 – Morten Andersen 34-yard FG (ATL 3–0)
- Q1 – ATL – 3:44 – Roddy White 48-yard TD pass from Joey Harrington (Andersen kick) (ATL 10–0)
- Q2 – IND – 14:42 – Reggie Wayne 23-yard TD pass from Peyton Manning (Vinatieri kick) (ATL 10–7)
- Q2 – ATL – 11:35 – Morten Andersen 30-yard FG (ATL 13–7)
- Q2 – IND – 6:45 – Dallas Clark 8-yard TD pass from Peyton Manning (Vinatieri kick) (IND 14–13)
- Q2 – IND – 2:38 – Ben Utecht 5-yard TD pass from Peyton Manning (Vinatieri kick) (IND 21–13)
- Q3 – IND – 5:05 – Joseph Addai 4-yard TD pass run (Vinatieri kick) (IND 28–13)
- Q3 – IND – 0:32 – Adam Vinatieri 24-yard FG (IND 31–13)

Hoping to rebound from their divisional loss to the Buccaneers, the Falcons stayed at home and played a Week 12 Thanksgiving interconference duel with the defending Super Bowl champion Indianapolis Colts. In the first quarter, Atlanta led early as they ended a 19-play, 63-yard drive with kicker Morten Andersen's 34-yard field goal. Later, the Falcons increased their lead with QB Joey Harrington completing a 48-yard TD pass to WR Roddy White. In the second quarter, the Colts got on the board with QB Peyton Manning completing a 23-yard TD pass to WR Reggie Wayne. Atlanta responded with Andersen kicking a 30-yard field goal, but Indianapolis started to gain steam as Manning found TE Dallas Clark on an 8-yard TD pass and TE Ben Utecht on a 5-yard TD pass.

In the third quarter, Colts' RB Joseph Addai got a 4-yard TD run, while kicker Adam Vinatieri nailed a 24-yard field goal.

With the loss, the Falcons fell to 3–8.

Despite the loss, RB Warrick Dunn (17 carries for 70 yards) became the 22nd player in NFL history to get 10,000 career rushing yards. He became the third RB under 5 feet, 9 inches to reach 10,000 yards rushing.

==== Week 13: at St. Louis Rams ====
Quarter	1	2	3	4	Total
Falcons	0	0	3	13	16
Rams	14	7	0	7	28

at Edward Jones Dome, St. Louis, Missouri

- Game time: 1:00 p.m. EST
- Game weather: Game played indoors (domed stadium)
- Game attendance: 52,051
- Referee: Peter Morelli
- TV announcers (Fox): Ron Pitts (play-by-play) and Tony Boselli (color commentator)

Game information
- Q1 – STL – 9:40 – Randy McMichael 1-yard TD pass from Gus Frerotte (Jeff Wilkins kick) (STL 7–0)
- Q1 – STL – 3:38 – Torry Holt 31-yard TD pass from Gus Frerotte (Wilkins kick) (STL 14–0)
- Q2 – STL – 1:55 – Isaac Bruce 8-yard TD pass from Gus Frerotte (Wilkins kick) (STL 21–0)
- Q3 – ATL – 8:24 – Morten Andersen 41-yard FG (STL 21–3)
- Q4 – ATL – 11:48 – Roddy White 15-yard TD pass from Chris Redman (Redman pass failed) (STL 21–9)
- Q4 – ATL – 7:17 – Michael Jenkins 5-yard TD pass from Chris Redman (Andersen kick) (STL 21–16)
- Q4 – STL – 1:17 – Steven Jackson 50-yard TD pass run (Wilkins kick) (STL 28–17)

Trying to snap a two-game losing skid, the Falcons flew to the Edward Jones Dome for a Week 13 intraconference duel with the St. Louis Rams. In the first quarter, Atlanta trailed early as Rams QB Gus Frerotte completed a 1-yard TD pass to TE Randy McMichael, along with a 31-yard TD pass to WR Torry Holt. In the second quarter, St. Louis increased its lead with Frerotte completing an 8-yard TD pass to WR Isaac Bruce for the only score of the period.

In the third quarter, the Falcons got on the board as kicker Morten Andersen kicked a 41-yard field goal for the only score of the period. In the fourth quarter, Atlanta tried to come back as QB Chris Redman completed a 15-yard TD pass to WR Roddy White, along with a 5-yard TD pass to WR Michael Jenkins. However, the Rams sealed the win with RB Steven Jackson scoring on a 50-yard TD run.

With their third-straight loss, the Falcons fell to 3–9.

==== Week 14: vs. New Orleans Saints ====
Quarter	1	2	3	4	Total
Saints	7	10	14	3	34
Falcons	7	0	0	7	14

at Georgia Dome, Atlanta, Georgia

- Game time: 8:30 p.m. EST
- Game weather: Game played indoors (Domed stadium)
- Game attendance: 69,553
- Referee: Gene Steratore
- TV announcers (ESPN): Mike Tirico (play-by-play), Ron Jaworski, Tony Kornheiser (color commentators), Michele Tafoya, & Suzy Kolber (sideline reporters)

Game information
- Q1 – NO – 3:18 – David Patten 25-yard TD pass from Drew Brees (Olindo Mare kick) (NO 7-0)
- Q1 – ATL – 1:22 – Roddy White 33-yard TD pass from Chris Redman (Morten Andersen kick) (7–7)
- Q2 – NO – 10:41 – Olindo Mare 23-yard FG (NO 10–7)
- Q2 – NO – 1:06 – Marques Colston 15-yard TD pass from Drew Brees (Mare kick) (NO 17–7)
- Q3 – NO – 9:13 – Marques Colston 2-yard TD pass from Drew Brees (Mare kick) (NO 24–7)
- Q3 – NO – 8:30 – Roman Harper 31-yard TD interception return (Mare kick) (NO 31–7)
- Q4 – ATL – 8:52 – Michael Jenkins 13-yard TD pass from Chris Redman (Andersen kick) (NO 31–14)
- Q4 – NO – 2:48 – Olindo Mare 36-yard FG (NO 34–14)

Trying to snap a three-game slide, the Falcons went home for a Week 14 Monday Night NFC South rematch with the New Orleans Saints. Making his first start at QB since 2002 was Chris Redman.

In the first quarter, Atlanta trailed early as Saints QB Drew Brees completed a 25-yard TD pass to WR David Patten. The Falcons answered with Redman completing a 33-yard TD pass to WR Roddy White. In the second quarter, New Orleans began to pull away as kicker Olindo Mare made a 23-yard field goal, while Brees completed a 15-yard TD pass to WR Marques Colston.

In the third quarter, the Saints pulled away as Brees and Colston hooked up with each other again on a 2-yard TD pass, while safety Roman Harper returned an interception 31 yards for a touchdown. In the fourth quarter, Atlanta got one last touchdown and Redman completed a 13-yard TD pass to WR Michael Jenkins. New Orleans sealed the win with Mare's 36-yard field goal.

With their fourth-straight loss, the Falcons fell to 3–10.

Following the game, it was announced that head coach Bobby Petrino had resigned from the Falcons. Afterwards, on Wednesday, December 12, it was announced that defensive backs coach Emmitt Thomas would be Atlanta's interim head coach for the rest of the season.

==== Week 15: at Tampa Bay Buccaneers ====
Quarter	1	2	3	4	Total
Falcons	3	0	0	0	3
Buccaneers	14	13	3	7	37

at Raymond James Stadium, Tampa, Florida

- Game time: 1:00 p.m. EST
- Game weather: 68 °F or 20 °C (Sunny)
- Game attendance: 65,133
- Referee: Jeff Triplette
- TV announcers (Fox): Matt Vasgersian (play-by-play) & J.C. Pearson (color commentator)

Game information
- Q1 – TB – 14:00 – Ronde Barber, 29 yd interception return (Matt Bryant kick) (TB 7–0)
- Q1 – ATL – 6:32 – Morten Andersen, 33 yd field goal (TB 7–3)
- Q1 – TB – 6:19 – Micheal Spurlock, 90 yd kick return (Matt Bryant kick) (TB 14–3)
- Q2 – TB – 11:24 – Matt Bryant, 33 yd field goal 11:24 (TB 17–3)
- Q2 – TB – 4:09 – Earnest Graham, 1 yd run (Matt Bryant kick) (TB 24–3)
- Q2 – TB – 0:00 – Matt Bryant, 28 yd field goal (TB 27–3)
- Q3 – TB – 4:08 – Matt Bryant, 34 yd field goal (TB 30–3)
- Q4 – TB – 7:42 – Anthony Becht, 1 yd pass from Jeff Garcia (Matt Bryant kick) (TB 37–3)

Trying to snap a four-game skid, the Falcons flew to Raymond James Stadium for a Week 15 NFC South rematch with the Tampa Bay Buccaneers. In the first quarter, Atlanta trailed early as Buccaneers CB Ronde Barber returned an interception 29 yards for a touchdown. The Falcons responded with kicker Morten Andersen getting a 33-yard field goal for their only score of the game. However, Tampa Bay immediately responded with WR Micheal Spurlock returning a kickoff 90 yards for a touchdown (the Buccaneers' first kickoff return for a touchdown in franchise history). In the second quarter, the Falcons' year-long struggles continued as kicker Matt Bryant made a 33-yard field goal, RB Earnest Graham getting a 1-yard TD run, and Bryant kicking a 28-yard field goal.

In the third quarter, Atlanta's turmoil continued with Bryant nailing a 34-yard field goal for the only score of the period. In the fourth quarter, Tampa Bay sealed the win with QB Jeff Garcia completing a 1-yard TD pass to TE Anthony Becht.

==== Week 16: at Arizona Cardinals ====
Quarter	1	2	3	4	OT	Total
Falcons	7	7	0	13	0	27
Cardinals	7	17	0	3	3	30

at University of Phoenix Stadium, Glendale, Arizona

- Game time: 4:05 p.m. EST
- TV announcers (Fox): Ron Pitts (play-by-play) and Tony Boselli (color commentator)

==== Week 17: vs. Seattle Seahawks ====
Quarter	1	2	3	4	Total
Seahawks	7	10	10	14	41
Falcons	0	17	3	24	44

at Georgia Dome, Atlanta, Georgia

- Game time: 1:00 p.m. EST
- Game weather: Game played indoors (domed stadium)
- TV announcers (Fox): Chris Myers (play-by-play) and Jason Sehorn (color commentator)

The Falcons salvaged one final win from the wreckage of their 2007 season in a 44–41 win over the playoff-bound Seahawks. The lead changed hands eight times in the first 47 minutes until the score was 34–27 in Seattle's favor when Chris Crocker picked off Seneca Wallace; from there Chris Redman completed his fourth touchdown of the game (it was Roddy White’s only score). Despite two more Seahawks scores Morten Andersen’s 32-yard kick with 3:26 to go iced the Falcons' win. This was the final kick of Andersen’s 26-year career dating back to 1982. This would be the Falcons' last losing season until 2013.

=== Standings ===
NFC South
	W	L	T	PCT	DIV	CONF	PF	PA	STK
^{(4)} Tampa Bay Buccaneers	9	7	0	.563	5–1	8–4	334	270	L2
Carolina Panthers	7	9	0	.438	3–3	7–5	267	347	W1
New Orleans Saints	7	9	0	.438	3–3	6–6	379	388	L2
Atlanta Falcons	4	12	0	.250	1–5	3–9	259	414	W1

== See also ==
- 2021 Houston Texans season, whose quarterback, Deshaun Watson, was also inactive due to personal conduct allegations
- 2021 Jacksonville Jaguars season, whose coach, Urban Meyer, also lasted less than one season
- List of other NFL teams affected by internal conflict
