= DeAngelo Hall =

American football player (born 1983)

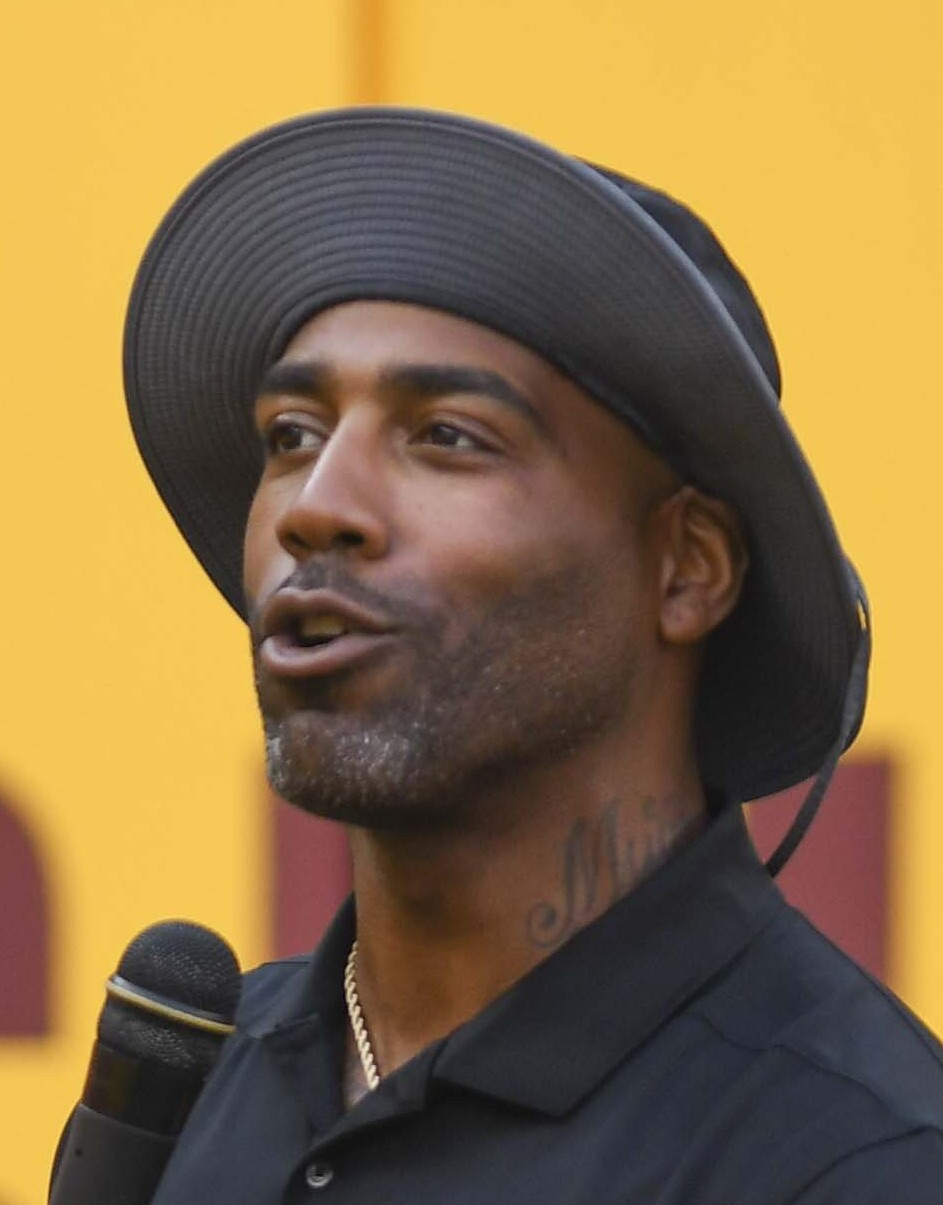
- Hall in 2021

Personal information
- Born: November 19, 1983 (age 43); Chesapeake, Virginia, U.S.
- Listed height: 5 ft 10 in (1.78 m)
- Listed weight: 200 lb (91 kg)

Career information
- Positions: Cornerback, safety (No. 21, 23)
- High school: Deep Creek (Chesapeake)
- College: Virginia Tech (2001–2003)
- NFL draft: 2004: 1st round, 8th overall pick

Career history

Playing
- Atlanta Falcons (2004–2007); Oakland Raiders (2008); Washington Redskins (2008–2017)

Coaching
- Carolina Panthers (2023–2024) Assistant defensive backs coach

Awards and highlights
- 3× Pro Bowl (2005, 2006, 2010); Washington Commanders 90 Greatest; First-team All-American (2003); Big East Special Teams Player of the Year (2003); NFL records: Most passes intercepted in a single game: 4 (tied); Most passes intercepted in one half: 4; Most career fumble return yards: 328

Career NFL statistics
- Total tackles: 811
- Sacks: 2.0
- Forced fumbles: 11
- Fumble recoveries: 15
- Interceptions: 43
- Defensive touchdowns: 10
- Stats at Pro Football Reference

DeAngelo Eugene Hall (born November 19, 1983) is an American professional football coach and former defensive back who played in the National Football League (NFL) for 14 seasons. He played college football for the Virginia Tech Hokies and was selected by the Atlanta Falcons with the eighth overall pick in the 2004 NFL draft. Hall played half a season for the Oakland Raiders before being released and signed by the Washington Redskins in 2008, playing for them until retiring following the 2017 season. In his playing career, he was a cornerback for the majority of his career before switching to free safety during his last few seasons.

Hall was invited to three Pro Bowls in his career: two with the Falcons and one with the Redskins. In 2010, he tied an NFL record by recording four interceptions in a game against the Chicago Bears, all of them in the second half. He also holds the NFL record for most fumble return yardage in a career, while his five career fumble return touchdowns ranks second behind Jason Taylor. Following his playing career, he began working as an on-air football analyst for several networks and programs as well as on the radio broadcast team for the Washington Commanders. Hall started his coaching career with the Carolina Panthers serving as their assistant defensive backs coach for two seasons.

== Early life ==
Hall attended Deep Creek High School in Chesapeake, Virginia, where he lettered in high school football, basketball, and track and field. At Deep Creek, he was a teammate of Chicago Bears' linebacker James Anderson and defensive end Darryl Tapp, who all also played together at Virginia Tech.

=== Football ===
As a junior at Deep Creek High School, Hall averaged 9.8 yards a carry as a running back and had seven interceptions as a cornerback. He was chosen as the district offensive and defensive player of the year and was a first-team pick as a defensive back on the All-Tidewater team.

As a senior, Hall scored 30 touchdowns and rushed for over 1,300 yards while averaging ten yards per carry. He also intercepted nine passes, posted over 100 tackles and had 16 tackles for loss. During his senior season, Hall helped lead Deep Creek to the state AAA Division Six championship game, which they lost 28–26, to Centreville High School.

After his senior season, Hall earned all-district player of the year honors and was named to the all-district team as a running back, cornerback and return man. He was also named Tidewater Player of the Year and the Norfolk Sports Club Player of the Year. The Associated Press picked him as a first-team Group AAA defensive back, and he was ranked the No. 2 player in Virginia by The Roanoke Times.

=== Track and field ===
Hall was a sprinter on the track team and placed sixth at the junior nationals in the 60-meter dash as a junior with a time of 6.93. He also placed third in the state AAA long jump as a senior, with a jump of 7.06 meters. He also ran the 55 metres in 6.40 seconds and was a member of the 4 × 100 m (41.76s) relay squad.

== College career ==
Hall recorded 190 tackles, 20 passes defensed, eight interceptions, two forced fumbles, one fumble recovery, and seven receptions for 86 yards with one touchdown in his three-year career at Virginia Tech. He returned 56 punts for 839 yards and five touchdowns. His 839 yards rank third on the Big East Conference career-record chart while his five returns for touchdowns rank second in conference history. Hall is one of the few players in college football history to score touchdowns on offense, defense, and special teams during their collegiate career. His accomplishments in college led to his induction into the Virginia Tech Sports Hall of Fame.

Hall majored in secondary education while at Virginia Tech.

=== Freshman season ===
Hall started strong in college, and turned in the fastest 40-yard dash among the freshmen at 4.37 in preseason strength and conditioning testing and also bench pressed 300 pounds. His first collegiate action was in the season-opener against Connecticut, during which he had three tackles, two assists and his first college interception. Hall made his first career start against Temple, during which he played a season-high 78 total snaps, recording six solo tackles, five assists, two passes broken up and an interception. He had four tackles, including one for a 3-yard loss, during Virginia Tech's loss in the 2002 Gator Bowl against Florida State.

Hall played in all 11 games, starting one, and recorded 24 solo stops, 18 assists, three pass breakups and three interceptions.

=== Sophomore season ===
Hall started ten games at cornerback and also returned punts as a sophomore. In the first game of the season against Arkansas State, he returned a punt 69 yards for a touchdown, and then returned an interception 49 yards for a touchdown. He recorded four tackles and a 51-yard punt return for a touchdown against Rutgers which helped earn him the Big East Conference Co-Special Teams Player of the Week honors. Hall had an assisted tackle and a pass broken up in Virginia Tech's victory in the 2002 San Francisco Bowl against Air Force. He was ranked seventh in the nation in punt returns, averaging 16.0 yards per return, and had a long of 71 yards and two touchdowns. He had 36 solo tackles and 19 assists, four interceptions, 12 passes broken up and a forced fumble.

During spring training, Hall posted the fastest forty time ever for a Tech football player with a timing of 4.15 in Virginia Tech's Rector Field House.

=== Junior season ===
As a junior, Hall became the first Tech player in nearly six years to play both ways in a game when he saw ten plays on offense and 28 on defense against Central Florida. During the game, he caught two passes for 41 yards, including a 29-yard touchdown, and had two solo tackles and an assist on defense. During the game against Syracuse, he scored three touchdowns, and set a Virginia Tech and Big East record with two punt returns for touchdowns, as well as a 24-yard touchdown run on offense. After the game, Hall earned Big East Special Teams Player of the Week honors. He had eight solo tackles and three assists against Miami, as well as a forced fumble, fumble recovery and 28-yard touchdown all on the same play to open Tech's scoring. This performance earned him Big East Defensive Player of the Week honors.

After the season, Hall was a second-team All-American selection, and was a semifinalist for the Jim Thorpe Award, given to the nation's top defensive back, as he ranked sixth on the team with a career-high 93 tackles.

== Professional career ==
Pre-draft measurables
Height	Weight	Arm length	Hand span	40-yard dash	10-yard split	20-yard split
5 ft 10 in (1.78 m)	202 lb (92 kg)	31 3/8 in (0.80 m)	9 3/4 in (0.25 m)	4.34 s	1.53 s	2.53 s
All values from NFL Combine

=== Atlanta Falcons ===
==== 2004 ====
The Atlanta Falcons selected Hall in the first round (eighth overall) of the 2004 NFL draft. He was the first cornerback selected in 2004 and became the third highest draft pick from Virginia Tech, following first overall picks Bruce Smith (1985) and Michael Vick (2001).

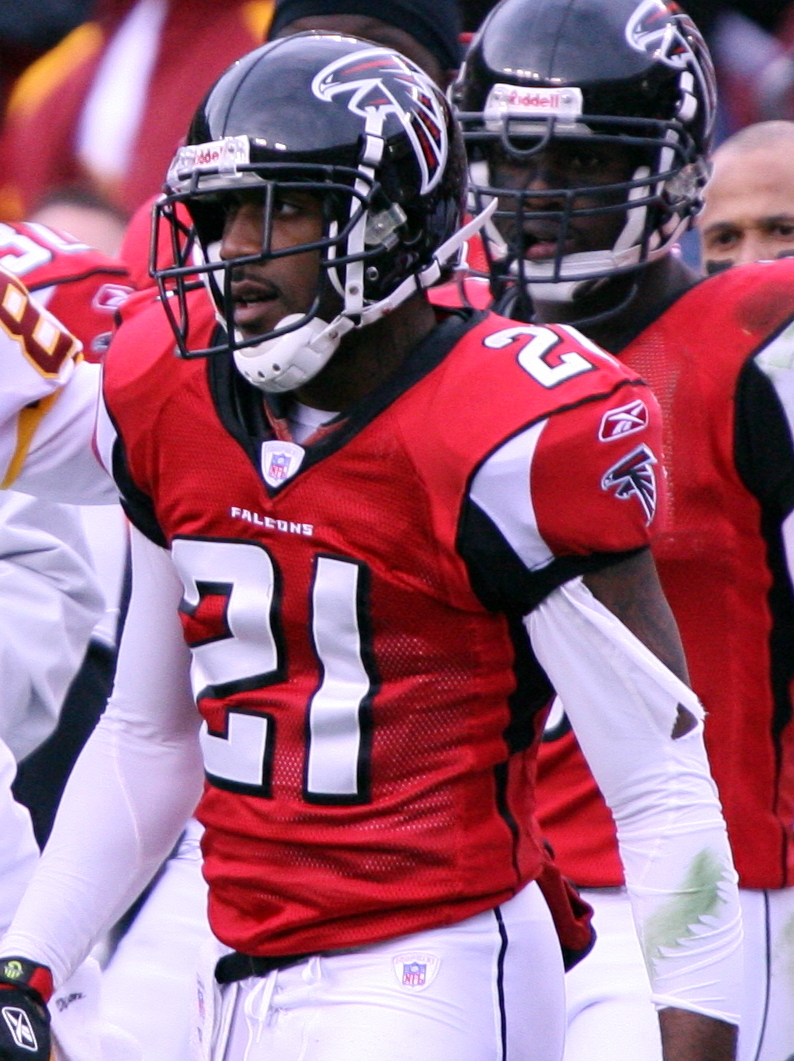
Hall playing for the Atlanta Falcons in 2006.

On August 3, 2004, the Falcons signed Hall to a five–year, $14.75 million rookie contract that included $7.49 million guaranteed and an initial signing bonus of $2.10 million.

He entered training camp slated as the No. 1 starting cornerback, following the departures of Tyrone Williams and Ray Buchanan. In August, Hall suffered an injury to his hip and was subsequently inactive for the first six games of the season (Weeks 1–6). In his absence, defensive coordinator Ed Donatell started Jason Webster and Kevin Mathis. On October 24, 2004, Hall made his professional regular season debut, but was limited to one pass deflection as the Falcons lost 10–56 at the Kansas City Chiefs. On October 31, 2004, Hall earned his first career start in lieu of Kevin Mathis and recorded four solo tackles during a 41–28 victory at the Denver Broncos season. Following Week 8, head coach Jim Mora retained Hall as starting cornerback for the rest of the season. In Week 12, Hall recorded five solo tackles, set a season-high with two pass deflections, and secured the Falcons' 21–24 victory against the New Orleans Saints by making his first career interception off a pass by Aaron Brooks to wide receiver Joe Horn with only nine seconds remaining in the game. On January 2, 2005, Hall had six total tackles (five solo), made two pass deflections, and made the first pick-six of his career after intercepting a pass by Matt Hasselbeck to wide receiver Jerry Rice and returning it 48–yards to score the first touchdown of his career during a 26–28 loss at the Seattle Seahawks. He finished his rookie season with a total of 36 combined tackles (29 solo), six pass deflections, two interceptions, a forced fumble, was credited with half a sack, and scored one touchdown in ten games and nine starts. He also set the record for being the youngest player to return an interception for a touchdown (21 years, 44 days).

The Atlanta Falcons finished the 2004 NFL season second in the NFC South with an 11–5 record and earned a first round bye. On January 15, 2005, Hall started in his first career playoff game and had one six–yard reception as the Falcons defeated the St. Louis Rams 47–17 in the NFC Divisional Round. On January 23, 2005, Hall started in the NFC Championship Game and recorded four combined tackles (three solo) during a 10–27 loss at the Philadelphia Eagles.

==== 2005 ====
He entered training camp slated as the de facto No. 1 starting cornerback. Head coach Jim Mora named him and Jason Webster as the starting cornerbacks to begin the season. On September 12, 2005, Hall started in the Atlanta Falcons' home-opener against the Philadelphia Eagles on Monday Night Football. Although wide receiver Terrell Owens gained 112 receiving yards, Hall recorded five solo tackles, made two pass deflections, and intercepted a pass by Donovan McNabb to Terrell Owens and was able to stop Owens on many of the Eagles' third down attempts, and his tight coverage of Owens on the last possession of the game helped Atlanta clinch a 14–10 victory. In Week 5, he set a career-high with ten solo tackles during a 28–31 loss against the New England Patriots. On October 16, 2005, Hall made six combined tackles (three solo), a pass deflection, and returned a fumble recovery that linebacker Michael Boley forced by running back Antowain Smith 66–yards for a touchdown during a 34–31 victory at the New Orleans Saints. In Week 16, Hall recorded four combined tackles (three solo), made a pass deflection, and set a career-high with his sixth interception of the season on a pass attempt by Chris Simms to wide receiver Joey Galloway during a 24–27 overtime loss at the Tampa Bay Buccaneers. He was inactive as the Falcons lost 11–44 to the Carolina Panthers in Week 17 due to a shoulder injury. He finished the season with 66 combined tackles (59 solo), ten pass deflections, a career-high six interceptions, three fumble recoveries, a forced fumble, and one touchdown in 15 games and 15 starts. He was selected to the Pro Bowl for the first time in his career in 2005.

==== 2006 ====
He returned to training camp as the de facto No. 1 starting cornerback under defensive coordinator Ed Donatell. He was named a starting cornerback, alongside Jason Webster, for the third consecutive season. In Week 2, Hall made four solo tackles, set a season-high with four pass deflections, and intercepted two passes by Chris Simms during a 14–3 victory against the Tampa Bay Buccaneers. On October 1, 2006, Hall made two solo tackles, two pass deflections, and had a pick-six after intercepting a pass thrown by Kurt Warner and returning it 37–yards for a touchdown as the Falcons defeated the Arizona Cardinals 32–10. The following game, he had four solo tackles, broke up two passes, and intercepted a pass by Eli Manning to wide receiver Tim Carter during a 14–27 loss at the New York Giants in Week 6. Prior to a matchup at the Cincinnati Bengals in Week 8, Hall made a wager with his close friend, wide receiver Chad Johnson while appearing on the NFL Network. The wagered on Johnson having two touchdown receptions during the game with Hall agreeing to wait tables at an Atlanta based restaurant owned by Bengals' tackle Willie Anderson if Johnson successfully had two touchdown receptions and Johnson agreeing to shave his bleach blonde mohawk that he had begun sporting that year. Johnson was limited to one touchdown reception as the Falcons won 29–27 at the Cincinnati Bengals and subsequently shaved his mohawk. In Week 15, he set a new season-high with eight solo tackles during a 28–38 loss to the Dallas Cowboys. He started all 16 games throughout the 2006 NFL season for the first time in his career and finished with a total of 58 combined tackles (51 solo), 16 pass deflections, four interceptions, and one touchdown.

==== 2007 ====
The Atlanta Falcons hired Bobby Petrino to be their new head coach after firing Jim Mora following a 7–9 record in 2006. Defensive coordinator Mike Zimmer retained Hall as the No. 1 starting cornerback and paired him with Lewis Sanders. In Week 3, Hall had as what was described as a "meltdown" in the third quarter during a 20–27 loss against the Carolina Panthers. As the Falcons led 17–10, Hall had held wide receiver Steve Smith Sr. without a reception to that point, but was called for a 37–yard pass interference penalty on Smith. One play later, Hall was penalized for roughness for trying to jam Smith at the line. John Abraham sacked Jake Delhomme on third down to end the drive, but as Hall walked off the field he would get into a back-and-forth with Steve Smith and was penalized for unsportsmanlike conduct which kept the Panthers' drive alive and subsequently led to a touchdown pass from Jake Delhomme to tight end Jeff King. Hall would then get into heated tirades with head coach Bobby Petrino and assistant coach Joe Whitt Jr. Due to the incident, Hall would be fined $100,000 by the Falcons and benched for the first half of the next game.

On October 7, 2007, Hall made one solo tackle, a pass deflection, and returned a fumble recovery that defensive end Jamaal Anderson cause by running back LenDale White for a 56–yard touchdown during a 13–20 loss at the Tennessee Titans. In Week 6, Hall set a season-high with 11 solo tackles and four pass deflections, while also intercepting a pass by Eli Manning to wide receiver Amani Toomer during a 31–10 loss to the New York Giants. On October 21, 2007, former Falcons' teammate Michael Vick was sentenced to 23 months in prison on dogfighting charges. In response, Hall carried a poster of Vick onto the field with him at the New Orleans Superdome, as the Falcons played against the New Orleans Saints, and also had "MV7" written on his eye black. He went on to record six combined tackles (five solo) during a 16–22 loss at the New Orleans Saints and was subsequently fined $10,000 by the NFL for his actions relating to his public show of support for Vick. In Week 9, Hall made four combined tackles (three solo), broke up a pass, and helped secure a 20–16 victory against the San Francisco 49ers by intercepting a pass by Alex Smith to wide receiver Darrell Jackson with 2:29 remaining in the game. On December 10, 2007, Falcons' head coach Bobby Petrino unexpectedly resigned as head coach to return to college football after a 3–10 record in 2007. Defensive backs coach Emmitt Thomas was subsequently appointed to interim head coach for the remainder of the season.He finished with a total of 70 combined tackles (63 solo), 16 pass deflections, five interceptions, one forced fumble, one fumble recovery, and one touchdown in 16 games and 15 starts.

On January 13, 2008, the Atlanta Falcons hired Thomas Dimitroff to be their new General Manager. On January 23, 2008, Dimitroff hired Jacksonville Jaguars' defensive coordinator Mike Smith as their new head coach.

=== Oakland Raiders ===
On March 20, 2008, the Atlanta Falcons traded Hall to the Oakland Raiders for their second-round pick (34th overall) in the 2008 NFL draft and fifth-round pick (143rd overall) in the 2009 NFL draft. Hall agreed to the trade with a requirement of an immediate contract extension. Immediately after the trade, the Raiders signed Hall to a seven–year, $70.00 million contract extension that included $24.50 million guaranteed and a signing bonus of $7.00 million.

He entered training camp slated as the No. 2 starting cornerback under defensive coordinator Rob Ryan. Head coach Lane Kiffin named Hall a starting cornerback to begin the season, alongside No. 1 starting cornerback Nnamdi Asomugha.

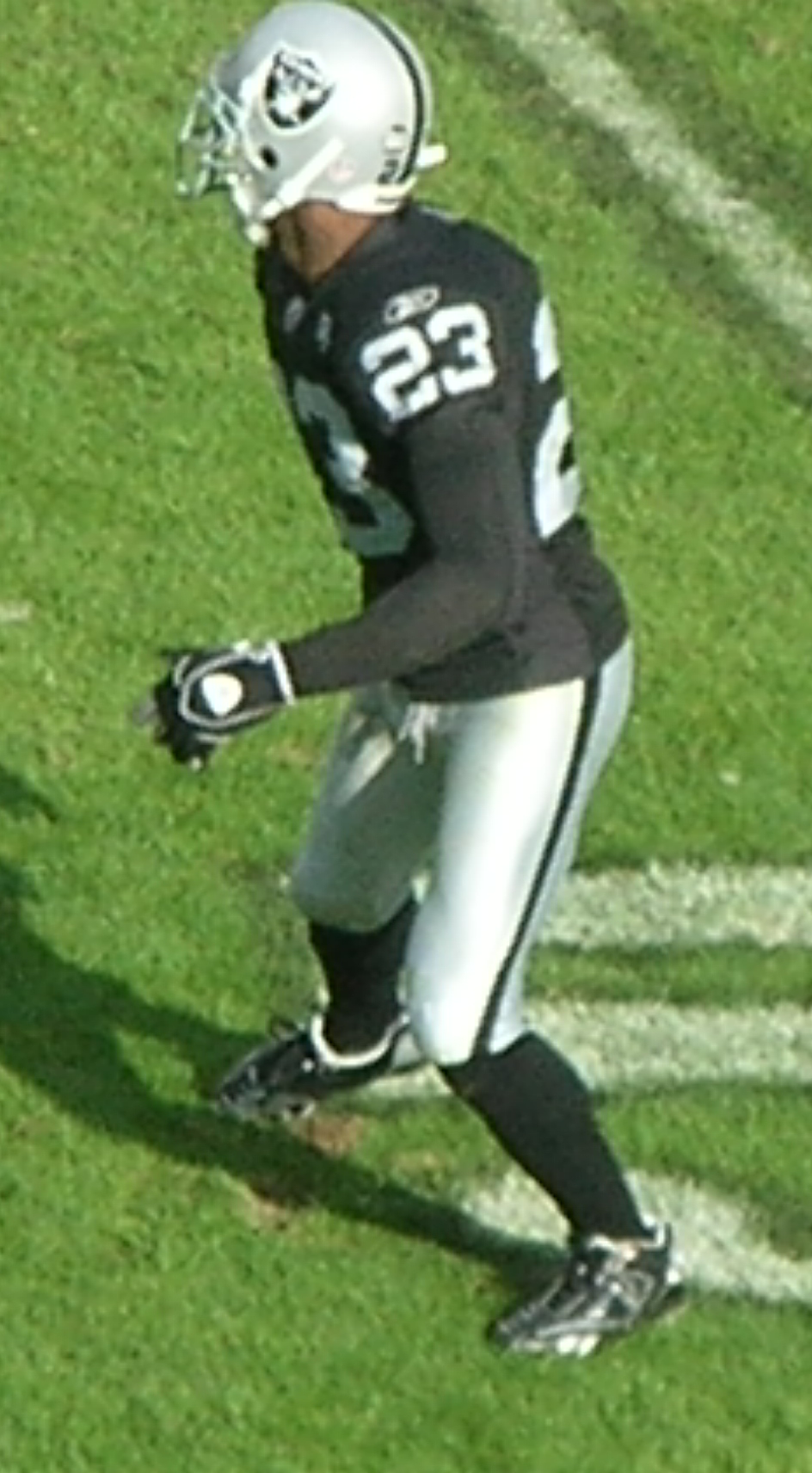
Hall in his final game with the Oakland Raiders in 2008

On September 21, 2008, Hall made six combined tackles (four solo), was credited with half a sack, made a pass deflection, and made his first interception as a member of the Raiders on a pass attempt by Trent Edwards to wide receiver Lee Evans during a 23–24 loss at the Buffalo Bills. On September 30, 2008, Raiders' owner Al Davis fired head coach Lane Kiffin and with the Raiders standing at 1–3 offensive line coach Tom Cable was appointed to interim head coach for the remainder of the season. In Week 7, Hall set a season-high with eight combined tackles (seven solo) and four pass deflections and also sealed the Raiders' 13–16 win against the New York Jets after intercepting a pass attempt by Brett Favre to wide receiver Jerricho Cotchery with only 2:25 remaining in the fourth quarter.

On November 5, 2008, the Oakland Raiders unexpectedly released Hall only eight games into the 2008 NFL season. The Raiders paid him $8 million or $1 million for each game due to his contract including a $7 million signing bonus and $1 million guaranteed salary as a veteran. He finished his short stint with the Raiders with 49 combined tackles (43 solo), 13 pass deflections, and three interceptions.

=== Washington Redskins ===
==== 2008 ====
On November 8, 2008, the Washington Redskins signed Hall to a one–year, $1 million contract and subsequently released cornerback Leigh Torrence to open up a roster spot for Hall. Immediately upon joining the team, head coach Jim Zorn named Hall the starting nickelback and listed him as the No. 3 cornerback on the depth chart, behind starting cornerbacks Fred Smoot and Carlos Rogers. He replaced Shawn Springs, who remained inactive due to a calf strain that sidelined him for four games.

On November 16, 2008, Hall made his Washington Redskins' debut and recorded two combined tackles (one solo), broke up one pass, and intercepted a pass by Tony Romo thrown to wide receiver Terrell Owens during a 10–14 loss against the Dallas Cowboys. Entering Week 14, Hall had supplanted Fred Smoot to become the No. 2 starting cornerback and retained the role for the last four games of the season. In Week 16, he set a new season-high with eight solo tackles and made three pass deflections during a 10–3 win against the Philadelphia Eagles. He finished his seven game stint (four as a starter) with the Redskins in 2008 with 25 combined tackles (20 solo), two interceptions and eight pass deflections.

==== 2009 ====
On February 27, 2009, the Washington Redskins signed Hall to a six–year, $54.00 million contract as an unrestricted free agent that included $22.50 million guaranteed, $9.50 million guaranteed upon signing, and a signing bonus of $1.50 million. His contract made him one of the highest paid cornerbacks in the league.

He entered training camp slated as the de facto No. 1 starting cornerback under defensive coordinator Greg Blache. Head coach Jim Zorn named him a starting cornerback to begin the season, alongside Carlos Rogers and backups Fred Smoot and rookie Kevin Barnes.

On September 13, 2009, Hall started in the Redskins' season-opener at the New York Giants and set a season-high with seven combined tackles (six solo), broke up one pass, and intercepted a pass by Eli Manning to wide receiver Steve Smith during a 17–23 loss. In Week 5, he tied his season-high of seven combined tackles (five solo), made a pass deflection, and had his second consecutive game with an interception after picking off a pass by Jake Delhomme to wide receiver Muhsin Muhammad and returned it for a season-long 44–yards during a 17–20 loss at the Carolina Panthers. In Week 10, he made five solo tackles, set a season-high with two pass deflections, and intercepted a pass by Chris Simms to wide receiver Brandon Marshall during a 17–27 victory against the Denver Broncos. He was inactive for three games (Weeks 12–14) after developing back spasms. He finished the season with a total of 58 combined tackles (46 solo), nine pass deflections, and four interceptions in 13 games and 13 starts.

==== 2010 ====
On January 5, 2010, the Washington Redskins named Mike Shanahan as their new head coach and vice president of football operations after firing Jim Zorn following an abysmal 4–12 record in 2009. Defensive coordinator Jim Haslett chose to retain Hall and Carlos Rogers as the starting cornerbacks to begin the season with Phillip Buchanon as the primary nickelback.

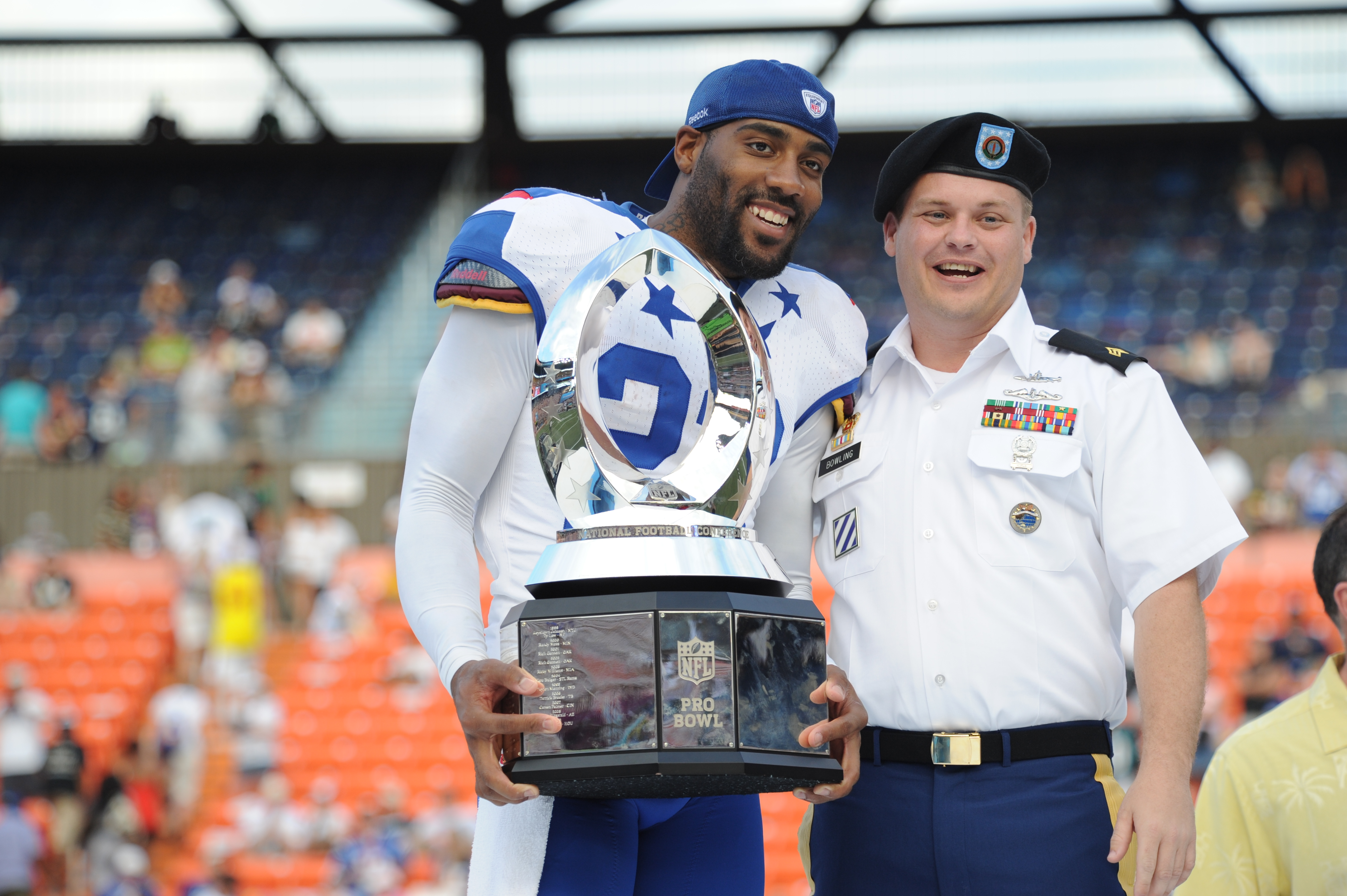
Hall being named MVP at the 2011 Pro Bowl

On September 12, 2010, Hall started against the Dallas Cowboys and made eight combined tackles (seven solo), two pass deflections, and recovered a fumble he forced by running back Tashard Choice and returned it 32–yards for a touchdown as they won 13–7. The following week, he had his highest amount of tackles (13 total, four solo) as the Redskins lost in overtime 27–30 against the Houston Texans in Week 2. On October 3, 2010, Hall made five combined tackles (four solo), broke up a pass, and sealed the Redskins' 17–12 victory at the Philadelphia Eagles by intercepting a pass by Kevin Kolb to wide receiver Jason Avant with only four seconds remaining in the game. On October 24, 2010, Hall recorded seven solo tackles, set a season-high with four pass deflections, set a career-high with four interceptions off passes thrown by Jay Cutler, and had a highlight-reel one-handed interception in the third quarter that he returned for a 92–yard touchdown as the Redskins won 17–14 at the Chicago Bears. He sealed the Redskins' victory with an interception off a pass by Jay Cutler to wide receiver Johnny Knox with only 2:25 remaining in the game. He tied with 18 other players for the single game interception record, with Deltha O'Neal (2001) being the last player before Hall to have four interceptions in a game. He currently is the last player to accomplish this as of 2024. Hall made all four interceptions in the second half of the game. His jersey worn during his four interception performance was sent to the Pro Football Hall of Fame after they requested it for public display. The following week, he made six combined tackles (four solo), two pass deflections, and tied his career-high with his sixth interception of the season on a pass thrown by Matthew Stafford to wide receiver Calvin Johnson during a 25–37 loss at the Detroit Lions in Week 8. He started in all 16 games throughout the 2010 NFL season and set a career-high with 95 combined tackles (65 solo), 16 pass deflections, tied his career-high with six interceptions, and had two touchdowns. His performance throughout the season earned him his third Pro Bowl and he was named the 2011 Pro Bowl MVP after recording six combined tackles, an interception, and returned a fumble recovery for a touchdown to help lead the NFC to a 55–41 victory against the AFC.

==== 2011 ====
He returned to training camp slated as the No. 1 starting cornerback following the departure of Carlos Rogers. Head coach Mike Shanahan named Hall the No. 1 starting cornerback to begin the season and paired him with Josh Wilson after Phillip Gaines received a four-game suspension. He also was again selected to be co-defensive captain, alongside London Fletcher.

In Week 9, he set a season-high with 12 combined tackles (six solo) as the Redskins lost 11–19 against the San Francisco 49ers and former teammate Carlos Rogers. In Week 11, Hall recorded 11 combined tackles (eight solo) as the Redskins lost in overtime 24–27 to the Dallas Cowboys. After the loss, Hall said to the press, "The way I'm playing right now, they need to cut me, because I'm definitely not worth what I'm getting." On November 27, 2011, Hall recorded five combined tackles (three solo), set a season-high with five pass break-ups, and was responsible for sealing the Redskins' 23–17 victory at the Seattle Seahawks by intercepting a pass attempt by Tarvaris Jackson to wide receiver Golden Tate with only 44 seconds remaining. His Week 12 performance at Seattle earned him the NFC Defensive Player of the Week. He started all 16 games throughout the 2011 NFL season and finished the season with 90 combined tackles (65 solo), 16 pass breakups, and three interceptions, and a forced fumble.

==== 2012 ====
During the 2012 preseason, it was reported that Hall would switch from the outside corner position to nickelback. He returned as the No. 1 starting cornerback, alongside Josh Wilson. On September 19, 2012, Hall started in the Washington Redskins' season-opener at the New Orleans Saints and made four combined tackles (three solo) and had his first and only career solo sack on Drew Brees for a seven–yard loss during a 40–22 victory. In Week 3, he set a season-high with 11 combined tackles (eight solo) and had one pass break-up as the Redskins list 31–38 to the Cincinnati Bengals. On October 14, 2012, Hall made eight combined tackles (four solo), one pass deflection, and sealed the Redskins' 26–38 victory against the Minnesota Vikings by intercepting a pass in the endzone by Christian Ponder to wide receiver Percy Harvin with 28 seconds remaining. In Week 8, Hall recorded six combined tackles (five solo) before being ejected late in the fourth quarter of a 12–27 loss at the Pittsburgh Steelers after removing his helmet and yelling at a referee. On November 15, 2012, the NFL fined him $30,000 for the incident. On November 22, 2012, Hall made three combined tackles (two solo), two pass deflections, recovered an onside kick, and intercepted a pass by Tony Romo to wide receiver Cole Beasley during a 38–31 victory at the Dallas Cowboys. He sealed the victory when he recovered an onside kick attempt by Dan Bailey with 23 seconds remaining and was able to return it 27–yards and had the opportunity to score a touchdown, but opted to slide before entering the goal line to prevent the Cowboys from receiving possession with any time left. He started all 16 games and tied his career-high with 95 combined tackles (68 solo), made 14 pass deflections, four interceptions, and one sack.

==== 2013 ====
On March 11, 2013, the Washington Redskins released Hall to prevent paying an $8 million guaranteed payout to Hall if he remained on their roster by the start of the new league year that officially begins every year on March 13. On April 1, 2013, the Washington Redskins re-signed Hall to a one–year $1.25 million contract that included a signing bonus of $250,000. He returned as the No. 1 starting cornerback to begin the season and was paired with rookie David Amerson.

On September 9, 2013, Hall started against the Philadelphia Eagles, and recorded six combined tackles (three solo) while also returning a fumble recovery for a touchdown during a 27–33 loss. On the opening drive, defensive end Ryan Kerrigan had a strip/sack on Hall's former teammate on the Atlanta Falcons, Michael Vick, that was subsequently recovered by Hall and returned for a 75–yard touchdown. In Week 3, Hall made four combined tackles (three solo), two pass deflections, and had a pick-six on an interception on a pass by Matthew Stafford to wide receiver Calvin Johnson that he returned for a 17–yard touchdown during a 20–27 loss against the Detroit Lions. On October 27, 2013, Hall recorded four combined tackles (three solo), made two pass deflections, set a season-high with two interceptions, and returned one for a touchdown during a 21–45 loss at the Denver Broncos. His pick-six occurred when he intercepted a pass by Peyton Manning to wide receiver Demaryius Thomas and returned it for a 26–yard touchdown. This was the fifth pick-six of his career and was his ninth career touchdown. In Week 10, he set a season-high with 11 combined tackles (seven solo) and forced a fumble during a 27–34 loss at the Minnesota Vikings. In Week 16, he recorded four solo tackles, had two pass break-ups, and intercepted a pass by Tony Romo to wide receiver Dez Bryant as they lost to the Dallas Cowboys 24–23. This would mark Hall's 43rd and final interception of his career. He started all 16 games for the third consecutive season in 2013 and finished with a total of 78 combined tackles (57 solo), 13 passes defended, four interceptions, three forced fumbles, and he set a career-high with three defensive touchdowns in one season. On December 30, 2013, the Redskins fired head coach Mike Shanahan after a 3–13 record. At the time, his staff included Kyle Shanahan, Mike McDaniel, Matt LaFleur, Sean McVay, and Raheem Morris.

==== 2014 ====
On February 18, 2014, the Washington Redskins signed Hall to a four–year, $17.00 million contract extension that included $5.65 million guaranteed, $4.40 million guaranteed upon signing, and an initial signing bonus of $3.25 million after an impressive 2013 season. Head coach Jay Gruden retained defensive coordinator Jim Haslett and defensive backs coach Raheem Morris. Hall returned as the No. 1 starting cornerback and was paired with David Amerson.

On September 7, 2014, Hall started in the Redskins' season-opener at the Houston Texans and set a season-high with eight combined tackles (seven solo) as they lost 6–17. In Week 3, Hall recorded five combined tackles (three solo), forced a fumble, and had a fumble recovery before he was carted off the field in the third quarter of a 24–37 loss at the Philadelphia Eagles after he apparently injured the heel of his foot. On September 22, 2014, the day following his injury, the Redskins officially placed Hall on injured reserve for the rest of the season (Weeks 4–17) after an MRI revealed a torn Achilles tendon, requiring surgery. He finished the 2014 NFL season with 16 combined tackles (14 solo), a forced fumble, and one fumble recovery in three games and three starts. Five weeks after suffering the injury, Hall re-tore his Achilles while at home recovering from the initial injury. On December 31, 2014, the Redskins and defensive coordinator Jim Haslett agreed to mutually part ways.

==== 2015 ====
On January 21, 2015, the Washington Redskins hired Joe Barry as their new defensive coordinator. During his recovery from his torn Achilles, Hall began playing safety on the scoot team. During training camp, he competed against Chris Culliver, Bashaud Breeland, and Davis Amerson to regain his role as a starting cornerback. Head coach Jay Gruden named Hall and Chris Culliver the starting cornerbacks to begin the season with Justin Rogers as the nickelback.

In Week 3, Hall recorded four combined tackles (three solo) before he was carted off in the third quarter of a 21–32 loss at the New York Giants on Thursday Night Football after suffering a toe injury. He subsequently remained inactive for the next five games (Weeks 4–9) due to his toe injury. Upon his return, Hall was listed as the fourth cornerback on the depth chart, behind Chris Culliver, Bashaud Breeland, and Will Blackmon. Entering Week 12, head coach Jay Gruden named Hall the starting strong safety, replacing Jeron Johnson. He was moved to safety full time following season-ending injuries to Duke Ihenacho and Trenton Robinson. On November 29, 2015, Hall started as a safety for the first time in his career and recorded four solo tackles as the Redskins defeated the New York Giants 14–10. In Week 15, he set a season-high with nine combined tackles (eight solo) and broke up a pass during a 25–35 win against the Buffalo Bills. On December 26, 2015, Hall made four solo tackles and returned a fumble on a botched handoff by quarterback Sam Bradford for a 17–yard touchdown during a 38–24 victory at the Philadelphia Eagles. With the play, Hall became the first player in NFL history to score five touchdowns off fumble recoveries and five off interception returns in a career. The play also helped the Redskins win the game, and in effect, clinched the NFC East division title for the first time since 2012. He finished the season with 48 combined tackles (39 solo), two passes defended, and one forced fumble in 11 games and seven starts.

==== 2016 ====
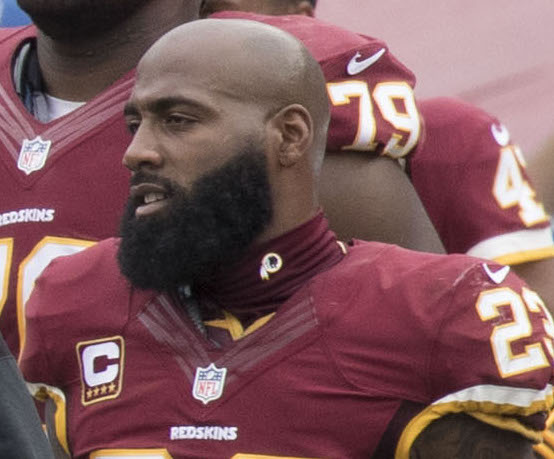
Hall with the Washington Redskins in 2016

Following the season, the Redskins saw the departures of Dashon Goldson, Kyshoen Jarrett, and Trenton Robinson. After they signed Josh Norman and drafted Kendall Fuller, defensive coordinator Joe Barry chose to fully transition Hall to free safety during training camp. Head coach Jay Gruden named Hall the starting free safety to begin the season and paired him with David Bruton. On September 12, 2016, Hall started in the Redskins' home-opener against the Pittsburgh Steelers and set a season-high with six combined tackles (three solo) as they lost 16–38. In Week 3, Hall recorded five combined tackles (four solo) before exiting the game in the second quarter as the Redskins won 29–27 at the New York Giants after he suffered an injury to his right knee while attempting to tackle wide receiver Odell Beckham Jr. On September 27, 2016, the Redskins officially placed Hall on injured reserve after it was confirmed that he had torn the ACL in his right knee and would miss the last 13 games (Weeks 4–17) of the 2016 NFL season. He finished the season with only 16 combined tackles (10 solo) and one pass deflection in three games and three starts.

==== 2017 ====
On January 22, 2017, the Washington Redskins promoted outside linebackers coach Greg Manusky to defensive coordinator after firing Joe Barry. On September 2, 2017, the Redskins placed Hall on the physically unable to perform list to start the season in order to recover from his torn ACL. On November 3, 2017, the Redskins activated him off the PUP list and added him to their active roster. He was immediately named a starting safety, alongside D. J. Swearinger, as Montae Nicholson was inactive after suffering a concussion the previous game. In Week 9, Hall started in his first appearance of the season and recorded five combined tackles (four solo), made two pass deflections, and also returned two punts during a 17–14 victory at the Seattle Seahawks. In Week 11, Hall set a season-high with six combined tackles (five solo) during a 31–34 overtime loss at the New Orleans Saints. Hall was surpassed on the depth chart and was replaced as a starting safety by Deshazor Everett. He was inactive as a healthy scratch for the last three games (Weeks 15–17) of the season and the last three games of his career. He finished the 2017 NFL season with only 14 combined tackles (11 solo) and two pass deflections in five games and two starts.

On May 14, 2018, during an interview with former long-time teammate Ryan Kerrigan, Hall officially announced his retirement, concluding his 14–year career.

== NFL career statistics ==
Legend
	NFL record
**Bold**	Career high

Year	Team	GP	Tackles				Fumbles				Interceptions					
Year	Team	GP	Cmb	Solo	Ast	Sck	FF	FR	Yds	TD	Int	Yds	Avg	Lng	TD	PD
2004	ATL	10	35	28	7	0.5	1	0	0	0	2	50	25.0	48	1	6
2005	ATL	15	65	58	7	0.0	1	2	86	1	**6**	177	29.5	65	0	4
2006	ATL	16	58	51	7	0.0	0	1	25	0	4	131	32.8	60	1	12
2007	ATL	16	70	63	7	0.0	1	1	56	1	5	80	16.0	33	0	16
2008	OAK	8	48	43	5	0.5	0	1	0	0	3	31	10.3	21	0	13
2008	WAS	7	25	20	5	0.0	0	1	13	0	2	6	3.0	4	0	8
2009	WAS	13	58	46	12	0.0	0	1	7	0	4	114	28.5	44	0	9
2010	WAS	16	95	65	30	0.0	2	2	32	1	**6**	92	15.3	92	1	16
2011	WAS	16	90	65	25	0.0	1	0	0	0	3	46	15.3	26	0	16
2012	WAS	16	95	**68**	27	1.0	0	1	0	0	4	62	15.5	27	0	14
2013	WAS	16	78	57	21	0.0	3	1	75	1	4	49	12.3	26	2	13
2014	WAS	3	16	12	4	0.0	1	1	17	0	0	0	0.0	0	0	0
2015	WAS	11	48	39	9	0.0	1	1	17	1	0	0	0.0	0	0	2
2016	WAS	3	16	10	6	0.0	0	0	0	0	0	0	0.0	0	0	1
2017	WAS	5	14	11	3	0.0	0	0	0	0	0	0	0.0	0	0	2
Career		171	811	636	175	2.0	11	13	328	5	43	838	19.5	92	5	132

== Career highlights ==
=== Awards and honors ===
NFL

- 3× Pro Bowl (2005, 2006, 2010)
- Pro Bowl MVP (2010)
- Washington Commanders 90 Greatest

College

- First-team All-American (2003)
- Big East Special Teams Player of the Year (2003)

=== NFL records ===
- Most passes intercepted in a single game (4, tied with several others)
- Most career fumble return yards (328)
- Second-most career fumble return touchdowns (5)
- Only player with at least five fumble return touchdowns and five interception return touchdowns

== Post-playing career ==
Following his retirement, Hall worked as a guest analyst for NBC Sports Washington and Fox Sports 1 before being hired by NFL Network in June 2019 as an in-studio analyst for their NFL Total Access and Good Morning Football programs. He joined the Washington Football Team to become their gameday radio analyst in 2020, serving alongside play by play announcer Bram Weinstein and host Julie Donaldson.

On September 1, 2022, Hall was inducted into Washington's Greatest Players list in honor of the franchise's 90th anniversary.

On February 18, 2023, the Carolina Panthers announced that Hall would be joining new head coach Frank Reich's coaching staff as an assistant defensive backs coach. The assignment is Hall's first coaching job. In February 2024, it was announced that Hall would be retained by the team under new head coach, Dave Canales. On January 31, 2025, Hall and the Panthers parted ways.

== Personal life ==
Hall was sometimes called "MeAngelo" during the early part of his career for his outspoken demeanor and style of play. He is a father of six children. He has advocated for the passage of the FIT Kids Act, which is federal legislation that would require school districts to report on students' physical activity and to give children health and nutritional information.

Hall has been longtime friends with former defensive end Darryl Tapp since childhood, with the two having gone to the same school from elementary school throughout college. They became teammates again when they both played for the Redskins in 2013.

Hall's cousin, Demetrius Knight, plays in the NFL for the Cincinnati Bengals.
