= Demorrio Williams =

American football player (born 1980)

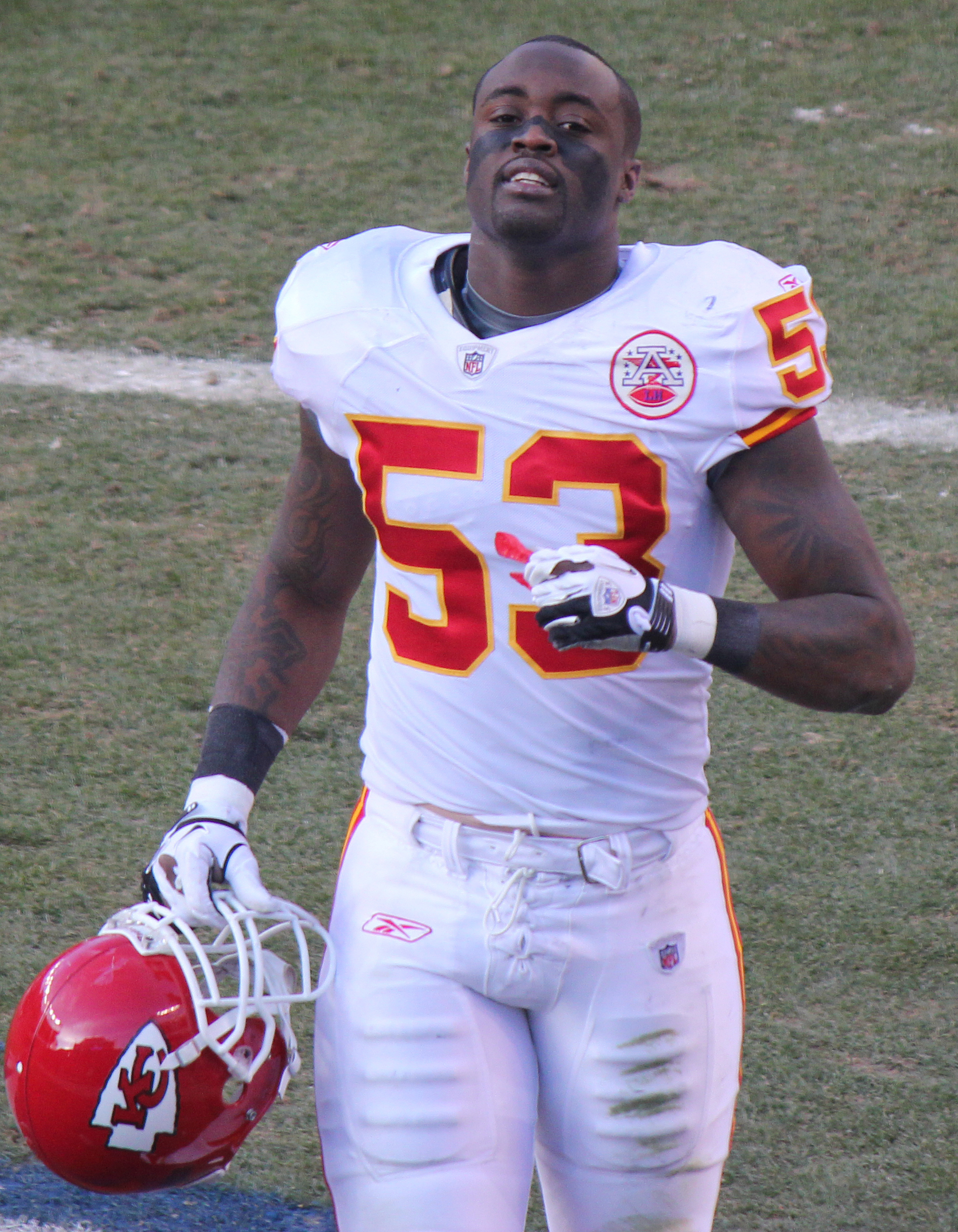
- Williams with the Kansas City Chiefs in 2012

No. 51, 53, 58
- Position: Linebacker

Personal information
- Born: July 6, 1980 (age 46); Beckville, Texas, U.S.
- Listed height: 6 ft 1 in (1.85 m)
- Listed weight: 235 lb (107 kg)

Career information
- High school: Beckville
- College: Kilgore College (2000–2001); Nebraska
- NFL draft: 2004: 4th round, 101st overall pick

Career history
- Atlanta Falcons (2004–2007); Kansas City Chiefs (2008–2011); San Diego Chargers (2012)

Career NFL statistics
- Total tackles: 620
- Sacks: 7.5
- Forced fumbles: 6
- Fumble recoveries: 4
- Interceptions: 7
- Defensive touchdowns: 3
- Stats at Pro Football Reference

Demorrio Dwain Williams (born July 6, 1980) is an American former professional football player who was a linebacker in the National Football League (NFL). He was selected by the Atlanta Falcons in the fourth round of the 2004 NFL draft. He played college football at Kilgore College for two years, then played for the Nebraska Cornhuskers.

Williams also played for the Kansas City Chiefs and San Diego Chargers.

== College career ==
Williams was born in Beckville, Texas. After high school, he signed with rural Cisco Junior College, but soon left the school. Following a year of oil field work, he decided to walk-on to Kilgore College located in the town of Kilgore, Texas. It was here that Kilgore head coach Jimmy Rieves decided to change him from a cornerback to a linebacker, and he excelled there. Williams helped lead Kilgore to an undefeated season in 2001, and a #2 national ranking. Prior to entering the NFL, Williams played at the University of Nebraska–Lincoln, where he completed his degree in sociology.

== Professional career ==
=== Atlanta Falcons ===
Williams started all 16 of the Falcons' regular-season games of the 2005 NFL season, recording 132 tackles, and ranking second on his team for that statistic. He had a career-high 15 tackles in a December 12, 2005 game against the New Orleans Saints.

=== Kansas City Chiefs ===
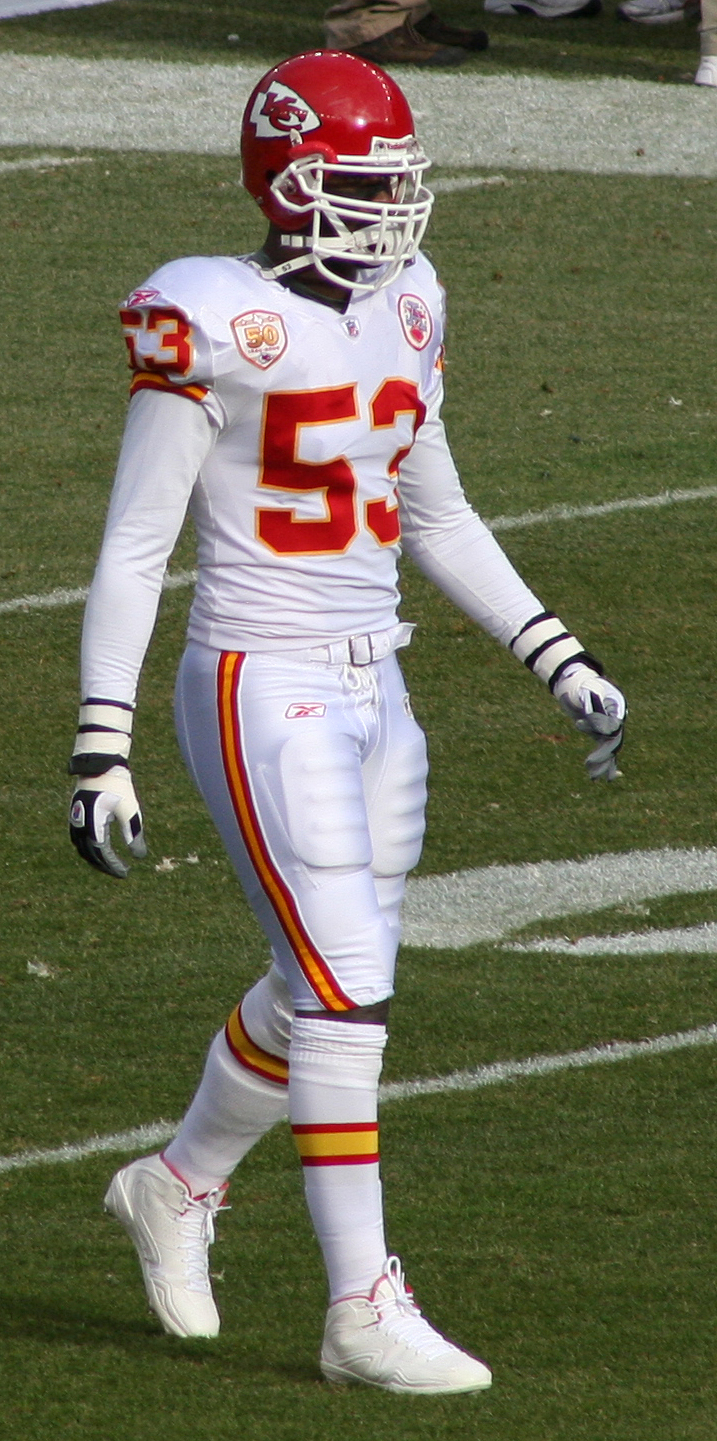
Williams in 2009

On March 1, 2008, Williams signed a five-year contract with the Kansas City Chiefs. After four seasons with Chiefs, Williams was released on March 6, 2012.

=== San Diego Chargers ===
Williams signed a one-year contract with the San Diego Chargers on March 8, 2012.

== NFL career statistics ==
Legend
	Led the league
**Bold**	Career high

=== Regular season ===
Year	Team	Games		Tackles					Interceptions					Fumbles			
Year	Team	GP	GS	Cmb	Solo	Ast	Sck	TFL	Int	Yds	TD	Lng	PD	FF	FR	Yds	TD
2004	ATL	**16**	1	56	48	8	2.5	6	0	0	0	0	0	0	0	0	0
2005	ATL	**16**	**16**	**127**	**99**	28	**3.0**	**9**	**2**	6	0	6	3	1	1	0	0
2006	ATL	**16**	10	93	59	**34**	1.0	6	1	9	0	9	3	**2**	1	**54**	**1**
2007	ATL	**16**	**16**	78	63	15	0.0	6	**2**	3	0	8	2	0	0	0	0
2008	KAN	**16**	9	62	46	16	0.0	4	0	0	0	0	1	1	**2**	0	0
2009	KAN	**16**	13	117	95	22	0.0	3	0	0	0	0	**6**	0	0	0	0
2010	KAN	**16**	0	19	17	2	1.0	1	0	0	0	0	1	1	0	0	0
2011	KAN	12	0	18	14	4	0.0	2	0	0	0	0	0	0	0	0	0
2012	SDG	14	3	50	39	11	0.0	1	**2**	**90**	**2**	**59**	3	1	0	0	0
		138	68	620	480	140	7.5	38	7	108	2	59	19	6	4	54	1

=== Playoffs ===
Year	Team	Games		Tackles					Interceptions					Fumbles			
Year	Team	GP	GS	Cmb	Solo	Ast	Sck	TFL	Int	Yds	TD	Lng	PD	FF	FR	Yds	TD
2004	ATL	**2**	0	**4**	**4**	0	0.0	0	0	0	0	0	0	0	0	0	0
2010	KAN	1	0	0	0	0	0.0	0	0	0	0	0	0	0	0	0	0
		3	0	4	4	0	0.0	0	0	0	0	0	0	0	0	0	0
