= Beckville, Texas =

- City
- Interactive map of Beckville, Texas
- Coordinates: 32°14′50″N 94°27′19″W
- Country: United States
- State: Texas
- County: Panola

Area
  - Total: 1.22 sq mi (3.15 km^{2})
  - Land: 1.22 sq mi (3.15 km^{2})
  - Water: 0 sq mi (0.00 km^{2})
- Elevation: 338 ft (103 m)

Population (2020)
  - Total: 722
  - Density: 676.1/sq mi (261.03/km^{2})
- Time zone: UTC-6 (Central (CST))
  - Summer (DST): UTC-5 (CDT)
- ZIP code: 75631
- Area codes: 903, 430
- FIPS code: 48-07108
- GNIS feature ID: 2409809

Beckville is a city in Panola County, in the U.S. state of Texas. The population was 722 at the 2020 census.

== History ==
Named after early settler Matthew W. Beck who arrived sometime around 1850. A local post office opened in 1857, and by 1885 the community had two churches, two steam gristmills, three general stores, a hotel, a blacksmith, and an estimated population of seventy-five. When the Texas, Sabine Valley and Northwestern Railway was built through the county in 1886, the townspeople demanded such high prices for their property that railroad officials bypassed it a mile to the north. Joe Biggs, who owned the land in that area, sold it to the railroad and laid out a new townsite. Within a short time most of the businesses were moved to the railroad and the old Beckville was completely deserted. The first Beckville school was built in 1889, and by 1897 the town had a three-teacher school with a total enrollment of 151. In 1914 the population reached 750. In 1917 a fire destroyed a part of the business district. Beckville was incorporated by 1929, when it had a population of nearly 880. A drought in 1927 and the onset of the Great Depression, however, halted the town's growth. By the mid-1930s the population had dropped to 453, and many businesses were closed. After World War II the population remained steady; in 1965 Beckville had a population of 423 and twelve businesses. In 1990 the population was 783, and in the early 1990s the community had fifteen rated businesses. In 2000 the population was 847 and in 2016 it was estimated at 858.

== Geography ==
According to the United States Census Bureau, the city has a total area of 1.2 square miles (3.1 km^{2}), all land.

== Demographics ==
Historical population
Census	Pop.	Note	%±
1930	435		—
1940	453		4.1%
1950	550		21.4%
1960	632		14.9%
1970	582		−7.9%
1980	945		62.4%
1990	783		−17.1%
2000	752		−4.0%
2010	847		12.6%
2020	722		−14.8%
U.S. Decennial Census

=== 2020 census ===
As of the 2020 census, Beckville had a population of 722. The median age was 34.4 years; 31.6% of residents were under the age of 18 and 14.8% of residents were 65 years of age or older. For every 100 females there were 97.3 males, and for every 100 females age 18 and over there were 95.3 males age 18 and over.

0% of residents lived in urban areas, while 100.0% lived in rural areas.

There were 253 households in Beckville, of which 46.2% had children under the age of 18 living in them. Of all households, 41.1% were married-couple households, 18.6% were households with a male householder and no spouse or partner present, and 34.4% were households with a female householder and no spouse or partner present. About 27.2% of all households were made up of individuals and 11.9% had someone living alone who was 65 years of age or older.

There were 340 housing units, of which 25.6% were vacant. Among occupied housing units, 65.2% were owner-occupied and 34.8% were renter-occupied. The homeowner vacancy rate was 5.1% and the rental vacancy rate was 17.1%.

Racial composition as of the 2020 census
Race	Percent
White	66.5%
Black or African American	24.0%
American Indian and Alaska Native	1.8%
Asian	0.4%
Native Hawaiian and Other Pacific Islander	0%
Some other race	3.3%
Two or more races	4.0%
Hispanic or Latino (of any race)	12.5%

=== 2000 census ===
As of the census of 2000, there were 752 people, 293 households, and 210 families residing in the city. The population density was 620.9 inhabitants per square mile (239.7/km^{2}). There were 361 housing units at an average density of 298.1 per square mile (115.1/km^{2}). The racial makeup of the city was 59.18% White, 31.78% African American, 0.27% Native American, 7.18% from other races, and 1.60% from two or more races. Hispanic or Latino of any race were 8.11% of the population.

There were 293 households, out of which 34.1% had children under the age of 18 living with them, 53.9% were married couples living together, 13.3% had a female householder with no husband present, and 28.3% were non-families. 24.2% of all households were made up of individuals, and 14.3% had someone living alone who was 65 years of age or older. The average household size was 2.57 and the average family size was 3.10.

In the city, the population was spread out, with 25.4% under the age of 18, 12.0% from 18 to 24, 26.9% from 25 to 44, 22.1% from 45 to 64, and 13.7% who were 65 years of age or older. The median age was 34 years. For every 100 females, there were 100.0 males. For every 100 females age 18 and over, there were 90.8 males.

The median income for a household in the city was $29,583, and the median income for a family was $34,271. Males had a median income of $28,750 versus $22,708 for females. The per capita income for the city was $12,818. About 19.4% of families and 22.7% of the population were below the poverty line, including 31.5% of those under age 18 and 21.4% of those age 65 or over.

== Education ==
The City of Beckville is served by the Beckville Independent School District.

In 1888 John L. Appling donated one acre of land for a school which joined the one acre he donated for the Baptist Church. In 1897 Citizens held an election for the establishment of free education. The order confirming incorporation of the Beckville school is dated April 17, 1897. Since Beckville had outgrown the 1888 school a two-story building was built on the location of the present day high school. The old 1888 school was sold and turned into a dwelling which can still be seen today to the right of the First Baptist Church in downtown Beckville. (according to the Railroad records the 1888 school is one of the oldest schoolhouses in Texas)

== Notable person ==
Demorrio Williams- Former NFL middle linebacker for the Atlanta Falcons, Kansas City Chiefs, and San Diego Chargers.
