= C. J. Gaddis =

American football player (born 1985)

No. 30, 22
- Position: Safety

Personal information
- Born: August 12, 1985 (age 41); Hattiesburg, Mississippi, U.S.
- Listed height: 5 ft 11 in (1.80 m)
- Listed weight: 203 lb (92 kg)

Career information
- High school: Raeford (NC) Hoke County
- College: Clemson
- NFL draft: 2007: 5th round, 159th overall pick

Career history
- Philadelphia Eagles (2007)*; Atlanta Falcons (2007)*
- * Offseason or practice squad member only

Carroll J. Gaddis, Jr. (born August 12, 1985) is an American former professional football safety. He was selected by the Philadelphia Eagles in the fifth round of the 2007 NFL draft. He played college football at Clemson.

Gaddis was also a member of the Atlanta Falcons.

== College career ==
Gaddis was the first non-starter in Clemson history to have an interception in three consecutive games. At Clemson, Gaddis held Georgia Tech receiver Calvin Johnson to zero catches for the only time in his career. He made the decision to forego his senior season with Clemson and entered the NFL Draft. Gaddis also played baseball at Clemson.

== Professional career ==
=== Pre-draft ===
Gaddis ran a 4.43 at Clemson University's Pro Day and had a 39.5 inch vertical leap.

=== Philadelphia Eagles ===
Gaddis was selected 159th overall by the Philadelphia Eagles in the fifth round of the 2007 NFL draft. He was released before the start of the 2007 season.

=== Atlanta Falcons ===
Gaddis was signed by the Atlanta Falcons, but did not see any game action in the two seasons he was on the team. He was released prior to the start of the 2008 season.
