= Adam Jennings =

American football player (born 1982)

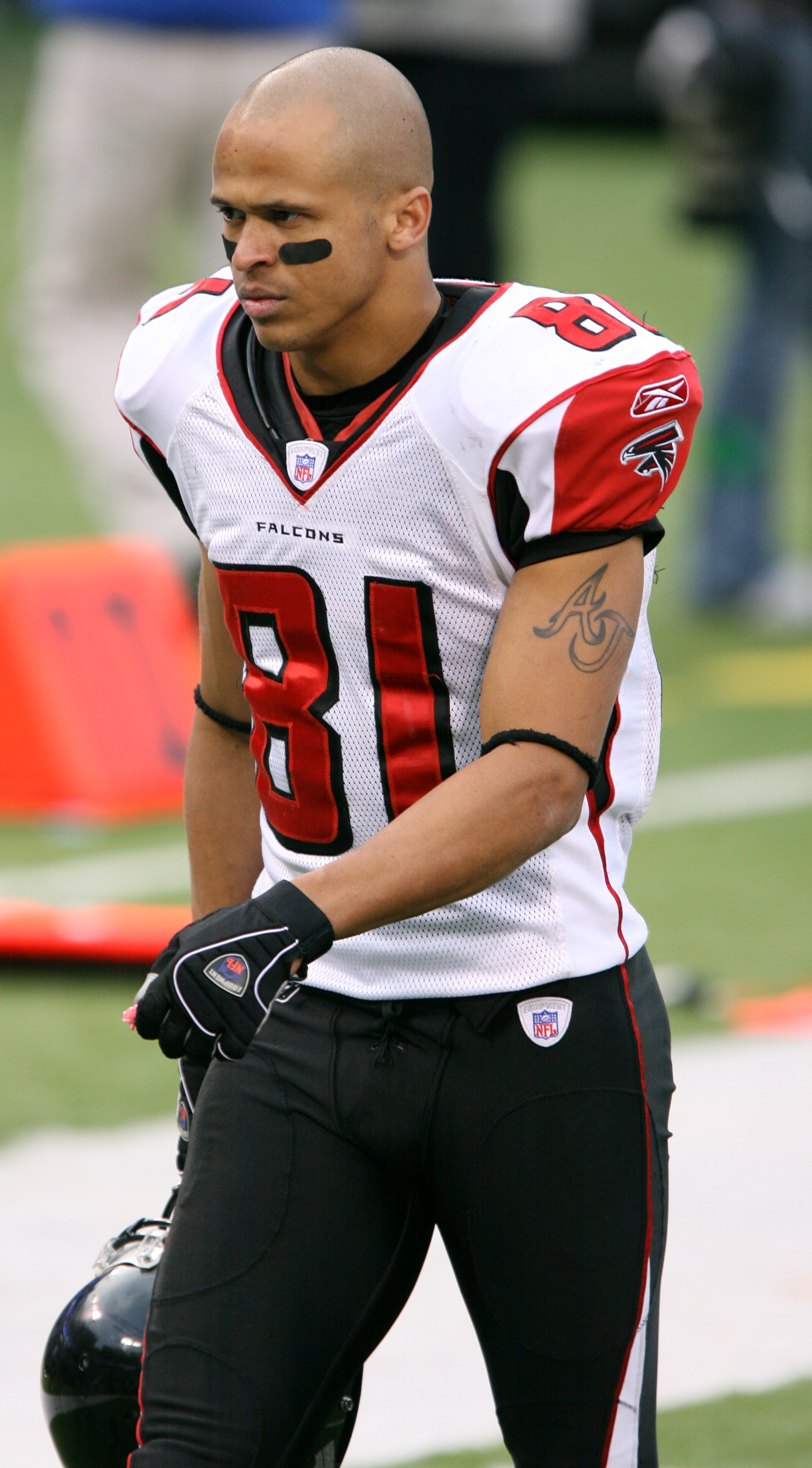
- Jennings with the Atlanta Falcons in 2006

No. 17, 80, 81
- Position: Wide receiver

Personal information
- Born: November 17, 1982 (age 43); Granite Bay, California, U.S.
- Listed height: 5 ft 9 in (1.75 m)
- Listed weight: 180 lb (82 kg)

Career information
- High school: Granite Bay
- College: Fresno State
- NFL draft: 2006: 6th round, 184th overall pick

Career history
- Atlanta Falcons (2006–2008); Detroit Lions (2008–2009); New York Giants (2010)*
- * Offseason or practice squad member only

Awards and highlights
- First-team All-WAC (2005)

Career NFL statistics
- Receptions: 6
- Receiving yards: 62
- Receiving touchdowns: 1
- Stats at Pro Football Reference

Adam Richard Jennings (born November 17, 1982) is an American former professional football player who was a wide receiver in the National Football League (NFL). He was selected by the Atlanta Falcons in the sixth round of the 2006 NFL draft. He played college football for the Fresno State Bulldogs.

Jennings was also a member of the Detroit Lions and New York Giants.

== College career ==
At Fresno State, Jennings was an All-WAC first-team selection as a kickoff returner during his senior year. He was also an academic All-WAC pick for four consecutive years.

== Professional career ==
Pre-draft measurables
Height	Weight	Arm length	Hand span	40-yard dash	10-yard split	20-yard split	20-yard shuttle	Three-cone drill	Vertical jump	Broad jump
5 ft 9 1/8 in (1.76 m)	181 lb (82 kg)	28 3/8 in (0.72 m)	8 5/8 in (0.22 m)	4.46 s	1.53 s	2.57 s	4.12 s	6.88 s	37.5 in (0.95 m)	9 ft 10 in (3.00 m)
All values from NFL Combine

=== Atlanta Falcons ===
Jennings was selected 184th overall by the Atlanta Falcons in the sixth round of the 2006 NFL draft. In two seasons with the Falcons, he totaled six receptions for 62 yards and one touchdown in 38 games while contributing with 53 punt returns. He was cut by the Falcons on November 11, 2008.

=== Detroit Lions ===
After signing with the Detroit Lions in 2008, Jennings was cut at the end of the Lions' 2009 training camp on September 5. He was re-signed on September 30, but he was placed on season-ending injured reserve on October 5. He was later waived on December 29.

=== New York Giants ===
Jennings signed with the New York Giants on July 15, 2010. He was waived on August 6.
