= Lewis Sanders =

American football player (born 1978)

No. 25, 21, 34, 29
- Position: Cornerback

Personal information
- Born: June 22, 1978 (age 48); Staten Island, New York, U.S.
- Listed height: 6 ft 1 in (1.85 m)
- Listed weight: 210 lb (95 kg)

Career information
- High school: St. Peter's (Staten Island)
- College: Maryland
- NFL draft: 2000: 4th round, 95th overall pick

Career history
- Cleveland Browns (2000–2003); Jacksonville Jaguars (2004)*; Cleveland Browns (2004); Houston Texans (2005–2006); Atlanta Falcons (2007); New England Patriots (2008)
- * Offseason or practice squad member only

Awards and highlights
- First-team All-ACC (1999)

Career NFL statistics
- Total tackles: 236
- Forced fumbles: 2
- Fumble recoveries: 3
- Pass deflections: 32
- Interceptions: 5
- Stats at Pro Football Reference

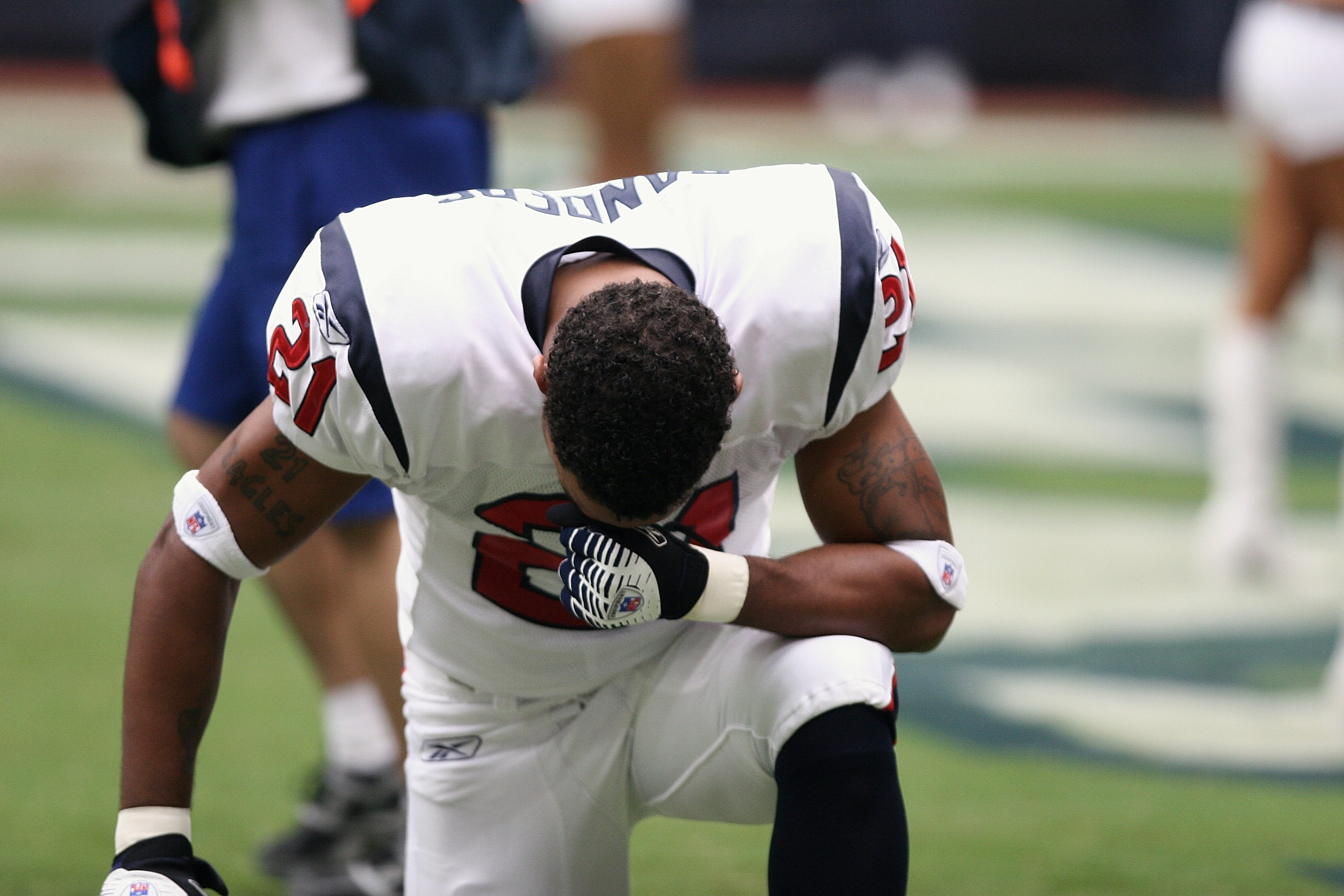

Lewis Sanders (born June 22, 1978) is an American former professional football player who was a cornerback in the National Football League (NFL). He was selected by the Cleveland Browns in the fourth round of the 2000 NFL draft. He played college football for the Maryland Terrapins.

Sanders has also played for the Houston Texans, New England Patriots and Atlanta Falcons.

== College career ==
He is only the fourth player in University of Maryland history to return 2 kickoff returns for touchdowns in a career, and he ranks sixth on the Terps’ career-record list with 956 yards on kickoff returns and seventh with 10 interceptions. In 1999, he was an All-American third-team choice by SportsPage.com and The Sporting News, as well as an All-Atlantic Coast Conference first-team selection and a semi-finalist for the Jim Thorpe Award, given to the nation's top defensive back.

== Professional career ==
=== Cleveland Browns ===
Sanders was selected in the 2000 NFL draft by the Cleveland Browns and played with the team through the 2004 season.

=== Houston Texans ===
He signed with the Houston Texans as a free agent in 2005 and played two years there.

=== Atlanta Falcons ===
On March 7, 2007, the Atlanta Falcons signed Sanders. He was released by the team following the season on February 15, 2008.

=== New England Patriots ===
On March 6, 2008, he signed with the New England Patriots.

== NFL career statistics ==
Legend
**Bold**	Career high

=== Regular season ===
Year	Team	Games		Tackles					Interceptions					Fumbles			
Year	Team	GP	GS	Cmb	Solo	Ast	Sck	TFL	Int	Yds	TD	Lng	PD	FF	FR	Yds	TD
2000	CLE	11	1	18	11	7	0.0	0	1	0	0	0	**10**	0	0	0	0
2002	CLE	**16**	2	37	**36**	1	**1.0**	1	1	25	0	25	2	0	**3**	**13**	0
2003	CLE	9	1	12	9	3	0.0	0	0	0	0	0	2	0	0	0	0
2004	CLE	**16**	5	32	25	7	0.0	0	**2**	**36**	0	24	6	0	0	0	0
2005	HOU	12	3	31	27	4	0.0	**2**	1	29	0	**29**	3	**1**	0	0	0
2006	HOU	9	**7**	**43**	35	**8**	0.0	0	0	0	0	0	6	0	0	0	0
2007	ATL	14	6	36	**36**	0	0.0	1	0	0	0	0	2	0	0	0	0
2008	NWE	10	4	27	23	4	0.0	0	0	0	0	0	1	**1**	0	0	0
		97	29	236	202	34	1.0	4	5	90	0	29	32	2	3	13	0

=== Playoffs ===
Year	Team	Games		Tackles					Interceptions					Fumbles			
Year	Team	GP	GS	Cmb	Solo	Ast	Sck	TFL	Int	Yds	TD	Lng	PD	FF	FR	Yds	TD
2002	CLE	**1**	0	**7**	**6**	**1**	0.0	0	0	0	0	0	**1**	0	0	0	0
		1	0	7	6	1	0.0	0	0	0	0	0	1	0	0	0	0
