= Jamaal Anderson =

American football player (born 1986)

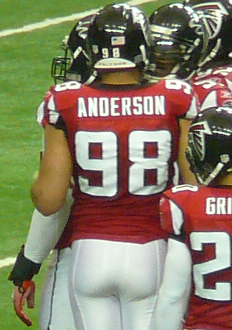
- Anderson with the Atlanta Falcons in 2009

No. 98, 90, 92
- Position: Defensive end

Personal information
- Born: February 6, 1986 (age 40); Little Rock, Arkansas, U.S.
- Listed height: 6 ft 6 in (1.98 m)
- Listed weight: 282 lb (128 kg)

Career information
- High school: Parkview (Little Rock)
- College: Arkansas (2004–2006)
- NFL draft: 2007: 1st round, 8th overall pick

Career history
- Atlanta Falcons (2007–2010); Indianapolis Colts (2011); Cincinnati Bengals (2012); Chicago Bears (2013)*
- * Offseason or practice squad member only

Awards and highlights
- First-team All-SEC (2006)

Career NFL statistics
- Total tackles: 132
- Sacks: 7.5
- Forced fumbles: 2
- Fumble recoveries: 1
- Defensive touchdowns: 1
- Stats at Pro Football Reference

Jamaal Anderson (born February 6, 1986) is an American former professional football player who was a defensive end in the National Football League (NFL). He was selected by the Atlanta Falcons eighth overall in the 2007 NFL draft. He played college football for the Arkansas Razorbacks.

Anderson was also a member of the Indianapolis Colts, Cincinnati Bengals, and Chicago Bears.

== Early life ==
Anderson grew up in Little Rock, Arkansas with parents Glenn and Karen Anderson and a sister, Danielle. His father, Dr. Glenn Anderson, was a professor at the University of Arkansas at Little Rock. The senior Anderson was the first deaf African-American to receive a doctoral degree in the United States. Jamaal was a two-sport athlete at Parkview Arts and Science Magnet High School in Little Rock before focusing on football as a wide receiver his senior season. Arkansas Razorbacks football coach Houston Nutt and brother Danny Nutt, who had a hearing-impaired father, used American sign language during a recruiting visit; Jamaal committed to Arkansas shortly thereafter on January 15, 2004.

College recruiting
Name	Hometown	School	Height	Weight	Commit date
Jamaal Anderson; WR	Little Rock, AR	Parkview	6 ft 6 in (1.98 m)	205 lb (93 kg)	Jan 15, 2004
Jamaal Anderson; WR	Recruit ratings: Rivals: 247Sports:				

== College career ==
The Razorbacks switched him to defensive end when Anthony Brown was injured during Anderson's sophomore season. Anderson excelled in his new position. Anderson recorded 17.5 quarterback sacks in his time at Arkansas, with those sacks going for minus 128 yards. He also recorded 130 tackles, with 84 solos. He had 32 stops for losses of 167 yards. He had 35 quarterback pressures, 8 pass deflections, 2 forced fumbles and a fumble recovery in 20 starts. For his role on the 2006 Arkansas Razorbacks football team, Anderson recorded first-team All-Southeastern Conference honors and honorable mention All-America honors. Anderson chose to forgo his senior season at Arkansas, and entered the NFL Draft.

== Professional career ==
Pre-draft measurables
Height	Weight	Arm length	Hand span	40-yard dash	10-yard split	20-yard split	20-yard shuttle	Three-cone drill	Vertical jump	Broad jump	Bench press
6 ft 5 3/8 in (1.97 m)	279 lb (127 kg)	33 5/8 in (0.85 m)	9 7/8 in (0.25 m)	4.75 s	1.59 s	2.73 s	4.22 s	6.88 s	34 in (0.86 m)	9 ft 8 in (2.95 m)	22 reps
Values were taken at Pro Day.

=== Atlanta Falcons ===
Anderson was drafted in the first round with the eighth overall pick by the Atlanta Falcons in the 2007 NFL draft. The pick used to select Anderson was previously acquired from the Houston Texans in a trade that sent Matt Schaub to Houston. Anderson earned the position of Falcons' starting right defensive end during training camp and started 15 regular season games. He finished the 2007 season with 30 tackles, one forced fumble, and three passses defended.

Anderson recorded his first sack against Chicago Bears quarterback Kyle Orton on October 12, 2008. He finished the 2008 season with 27 tackles, and two sacks. He moved to defensive tackle after a few games in 2009 due to injuries to the Falcons defensive line and his struggles at end.

On July 29, 2011, he was released by Atlanta. Anderson played in 60 games over four seasons for Atlanta, with 47 starts.

=== Indianapolis Colts ===
On August 1, 2011, Anderson signed with the Indianapolis Colts. In a game against the Pittsburgh Steelers on September 25, 2011, Anderson recovered a Ben Roethlisberger fumble caused by Dwight Freeney and returned it 47 yards for his first and only NFL touchdown.

=== Cincinnati Bengals ===
Anderson signed with the Cincinnati Bengals on March 23, 2012, and was released on July 10, 2013.

=== Chicago Bears ===
Anderson signed with the Chicago Bears on July 25, 2013 for a one-year deal. He was released on August 17, 2013.

=== NFL statistics ===
Year	Team	GP	COMB	TOTAL	AST	SACK	FF	FR	FR YDS	INT	IR YDS	AVG IR	LNG	TD	PD
2007	ATL	16	30	26	4	0.0	1	0	0	0	0	0	0	0	3
2008	ATL	15	27	24	3	2.0	0	0	0	0	0	0	0	0	3
2009	ATL	13	27	17	10	0.5	0	0	0	0	0	0	0	0	2
2010	ATL	16	21	16	5	2.0	1	0	0	0	0	0	0	0	1
2011	IND	15	24	12	12	3.0	0	1	47	0	0	0	0	1	1
2012	CIN	2	3	1	2	0.0	0	0	0	0	0	0	0	0	0
Career		77	132	96	36	7.5	2	1	0	0	0	0	0	0	10
