= Marcus Wilkins =

American football player (born 1980)

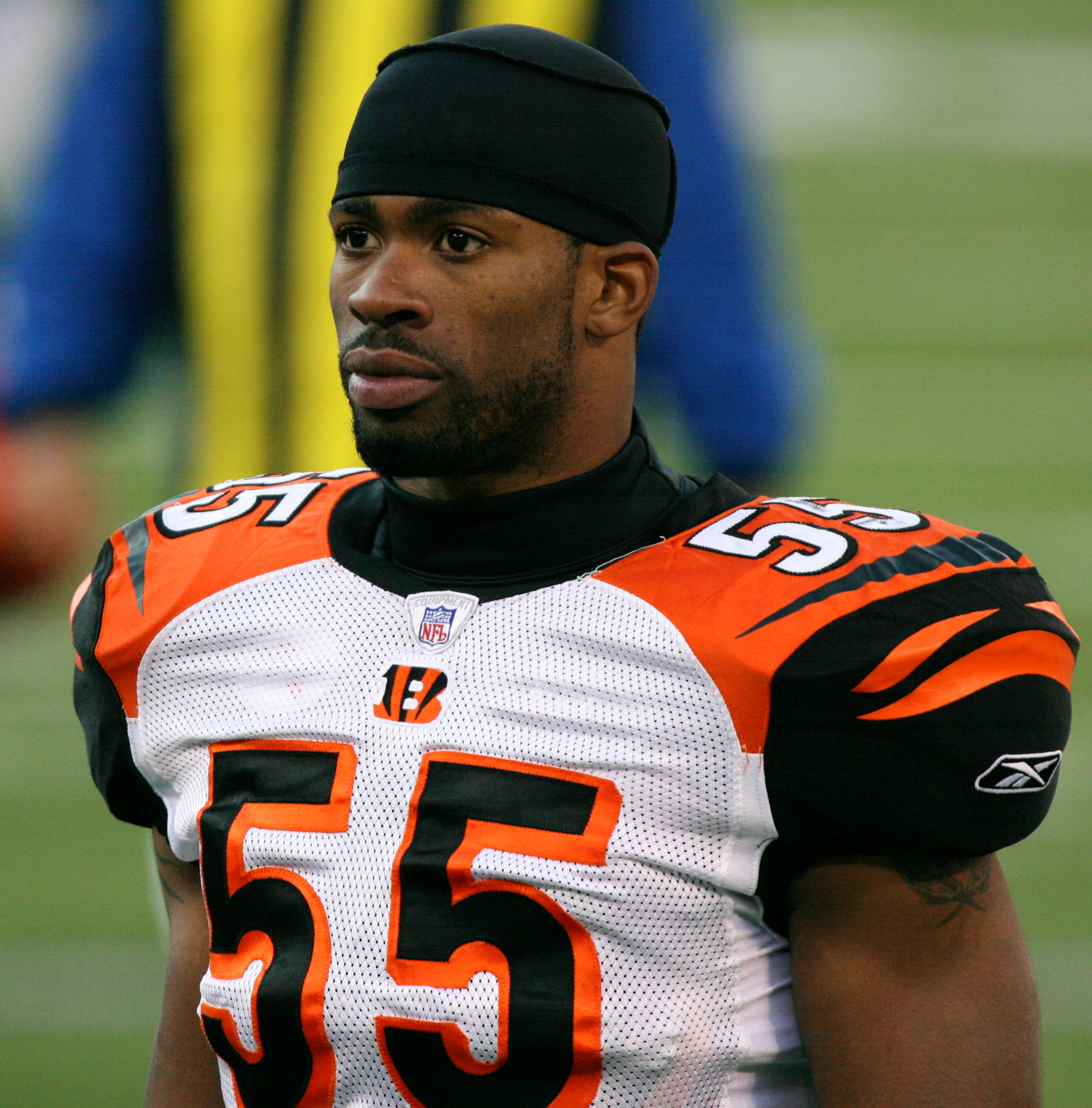

No. 55, 50
- Position: Linebacker

Personal information
- Born: January 2, 1980 (age 46); Austin, Texas, U.S.
- Listed height: 6 ft 2 in (1.88 m)
- Listed weight: 233 lb (106 kg)

Career information
- High school: Westwood (Austin)
- College: Texas
- NFL draft: 2002: undrafted

Career history
- Green Bay Packers (2002–2003); Arizona Cardinals (2004)*; Cincinnati Bengals (2004–2006); Atlanta Falcons (2007)
- * Offseason or practice squad member only

Career NFL statistics
- Total tackles: 74
- Forced fumbles: 2
- Fumble recoveries: 3
- Defensive touchdowns: 1
- Stats at Pro Football Reference

Marcus Wesley Wilkins (born January 2, 1980) is an American former professional football player who was a linebacker for six years in the National Football League (NFL) with the Green Bay Packers, Cincinnati Bengals and Atlanta Falcons. He played four years of college football for the Texas Longhorns.

Wilkins attended Westwood High School in Austin, Texas.

Wilkins was Mack Brown's first verbal commitment when he arrived at the University of Texas at Austin. Wilkins was a four year letter winner who played in 49 games who helped the Longhorns win a Big 12 championship and two bowl games.

He was undrafted in 2002, but was signed by the Green Bay Packers as an undrafted free agent that April. He played for the Packers for two seasons and in 2003 he co-led the league with fumbles recovered for a TD with 1. After the 2003 season he spent time on the injured-reserved and was resigned by the Packers. During training camp he was waived by the Packers but then immediately signed by the Arizona Cardinals, who waived him 11 days later after which he was signed by the Bengals the next day. He played the next two seasons with the Bengals. After the 2006 season he became a free agent and was signed by the Atlanta Falcons who released him after the 2007 season.
