= Beckville Independent School District =

School district in Texas

Location
- Beckville, Texas ESC Region 7 USA
- Coordinates: 32°14′14″N 94°27′15″W

District information
- Type: Independent school district
- Grades: Pre-K through 12
- Superintendent: Devin Tate
- Schools: 2 (2024-25)
- NCES District ID: 4809690

Students and staff
- Students: 682 (2024-25)
- Teachers: 67.8 (2024-25) (on full-time equivalent (FTE) basis)
- Student–teacher ratio: 10.1 (2024-25)
- Athletic conference: UIL Class 1A Football Division I
- District mascot: Bearcats
- Colors: Blue, White

Other information
- TEA District Report Card Rating for 2024-2025: B (88)
- Last Updated: 2024-2025
- Website: Beckville ISD

Beckville Independent School District is a public school district based in Beckville, Texas (USA).

Beckville ISD is located within Panola County.

== Finances ==
As of 2025, Beckville ISD has a combined tax rate of $0.849 per $100. The new figure includes $0.6189 for maintenance and operations (M&O) and $0.2305 for interest and sinking (I&S) funds.

== Academic achievement ==
In 2011, the school district was rated "academically acceptable" by the Texas Education Agency.

== Schools ==
As of 2025, the district has two campuses:

- Beckville Junior/Senior High (Grades 6-12)
- Beckville Sunset Elementary (Grades PK-5)

== See also ==
- List of school districts in Texas
