= Ray Crockett =

American football player (born 1967)

No. 39
- Position: Cornerback

Personal information
- Born: January 5, 1967 (age 59); Dallas, Texas, U.S.
- Listed height: 5 ft 9 in (1.75 m)
- Listed weight: 178 lb (81 kg)

Career information
- High school: Duncanville (Duncanville, Texas)
- College: Baylor
- NFL draft: 1989: 4th round, 86th overall pick

Career history
- Detroit Lions (1989–1993); Denver Broncos (1994–2000); Kansas City Chiefs (2001–2002)

Awards and highlights
- 2× Super Bowl champion (XXXII, XXXIII), All-Pro (1991); Mackey Award (1991); NFC Interception Leader (1991); Detroit Lions 50th Anniversary Team; Denver Broncos 50th Anniversary Team; 100 greatest Denver Broncos of all time; 2× All-SWC (1987-1988); Baylor Athletic Hall of Fame Team

Career NFL statistics
- Tackles: 879
- Interceptions: 36
- Sacks: 15.5
- Touchdowns: 5
- Stats at Pro Football Reference

Donald Ray Crockett (born January 5, 1967) is an American former professional football player in the National Football League (NFL).

== Professional career ==
=== Pre-draft ===
NFL draft analysts projected Crockett would be selected in the late first-round to the early second-round of the 1989 NFL Draft.

Pre-draft measurables
Height	Weight	Arm length	Hand span	40-yard dash	10-yard split	20-yard split	Bench press
5 ft 9 1/4 in (1.76 m)	178 lb (81 kg)	29 3/4 in (0.76 m)	8 1/4 in (0.21 m)	4.61 s	1.61 s	2.74 s	17 reps
All values from NFL Combine

=== Detroit Lions ===
==== 1989 season ====
The Detroit Lions selected Crockett in the fourth round (86th overall) of the 1989 NFL draft. He was the seventh cornerback drafted in 1989.

On July 30, 1989, the Detroit Lions signed Crockett to a three–year, $310,000 rookie contract that included an initial signing bonus of $75,000. Throughout training camp, he competed against Terry Taylor and Bruce McNorton to be the No. 2 starting cornerback. Head coach Wayne Fontes named him a backup and listed him as the third cornerback on the depth chart to begin the season, behind Jerry Holmes and Terry Taylor.

On September 10, 1989, Crockett made his professional regular season debut in the Detroit Lions’ home-opener against the Phoenix Cardinals and made one solo tackle as they lost 13–16. On December 17, 1989, Crockett made one solo tackle, a pass deflection, and had the first interception of his career, picking off a pass Joe Ferguson threw to running back Sylvester Stamps as the Lions routed the Tampa Bay Buccaneers 7–33. The following week, he set a season-high with six combined tackles (four solo) and made one pass deflection during a 31–24 victory at the Atlanta Falcons in Week 16. He finished his rookie season with 46 combined tackles (34 solo), four pass deflections, a forced fumble, a fumble recovery, and one interception in 16 games and didn't receive a start.

==== 1990 season ====
He entered training camp as a candidate to compete for a starting role at cornerback following the departure of Jerry Holmes. He competed against LeRoy Irvin and Bruce McNorton. Head coach Wayne Fontes named Crockett a backup and listed him as the fourth cornerback on the depth chart, behind Terry Taylor, LeRoy Irvin, and Bruce McNorton.

On September 21, 1990, the NFL issued a suspension for life to Terry Taylor for his third violation of the NFL’s drug abuse policy after failing a drug test for illegal substances. Entering Week 12, head coach Wayne Fontes named Crockett a starting cornerback for the remainder of the season, replacing Bruce McNorton. On November 22, 1990, Crockett earned his first career start and made five solo tackles, one pass deflection, and intercepted a pass John Elway to wide receiver Vance Johnson as the Lions defeated the Denver Broncos 27–40. In Week 15, he made six solo tackles, one pass deflection, and made his first career sack on Jim Harbaugh for a 14–yard loss during a 21–38 win against the Chicago Bears. He finished the 1990 NFL season with a total of 91 combined tackles (62 solo), ten pass deflections, three interceptions, two forced fumbles, two fumble recoveries, and one sack in 16 games and six starts.

==== 1991 season ====
He entered training camp slated as a starting cornerback under defensive coordinator Woody Widenhofer following the departures of LeRoy Irvin and Bruce McNorton. Head coach Wayne Fontes named Crockett and Melvin Jenkins the starting cornerbacks to begin the season.

In Week 2, he set a season-high with 12 combined tackles (nine solo) as the Lions defeated the Green Bay Packers 23–14. On September 15, 1991, Crockett made three combined tackles (two solo), two pass deflections, and secured a 13–17 win against the Miami Dolphins by blocking a pass attempt Dan Marino threw to wide receiver Tony Martin at the goal line on fourth down. On October 27, 1991, Crockett recorded eight combined tackles (six solo), set a season-high with four pass deflections, and returned an interception for the first touchdown of his career during a 10–34 win against the Dallas Cowboys. During the fourth quarter, Crockett intercepted a pass Troy Aikman threw to tight end Rob Awalt and returned it 96–yards for a touchdown. He was named the NFC Defensive Player of the Week for his performance. On November 28, 1991, Crockett recorded eight solo tackles, made one pass deflection, and sealed a 6–16 win against the Chicago Bears by intercepting a pass Jim Harbaugh threw to wide receiver Wendell Davis with two minutes remaining in the game. In Week 16, he made three solo tackles, two pass deflections, and set a career-high with his sixth interception of the season, intercepting a pass Mike Tomczak threw to Erik Affholter during a 21–17 win at the Green Bay Packers. He started in all 16 games for the first time in his career and finished with 86 combined tackles (74 solo), 16 pass deflections, six interceptions, a forced fumble, one sack, and scored one touchdown.

The Detroit Lions finished the 1991 NFL season in first in the NFC Central with a 12–4 record to earn a first round bye. On January 5, 1992, Crockett started in his first career playoff game and made five combined tackles (four solo) and one pass deflection as the Lions routed the Dallas Cowboys 38–6 in the Divisional Round. The following week, he started in the NFC Championship Game and recorded four solo tackles as the Lions lost 10–41 at the Washington Redskins who went on to win Super Bowl XXIV.

==== 1992 season ====
He returned as the No. 1 starting cornerback to begin the season alongside Melvin Jenkins. On September 13, 1992, Crockett recorded five solo tackles, set a season-high with two pass deflections, and intercepted a pass Rich Gannon threw to Cris Carter as the Lions defeated the Minnesota Vikings 17–31. He was inactive as the Lions lost 7–13 against the New Orleans Saints in Week 5 due to an ankle injury. In Week 11, he set a season-high with eight combined tackles (six solo) during a 14–17 loss at the Pittsburgh Steelers. He finished the 1992 NFL season with 52 combined tackles (41 solo), 12 pass deflections, four interceptions, one forced fumble, a fumble recovery, and a sack in 15 games and 15 starts. On December 31, 1992, the Detroit Lions fired defensive coordinator Woody Widenhofer after they finished the season with a 5–11 record.

==== 1993 season ====
The Detroit Lions selected cornerback Ryan McNeil in the second round (33rd overall) of the 1993 NFL draft and also signed free agent Tim McKyer. The Lions' new defensive coordinator Hank Bullough retained Crockett as the No. 1 starting cornerback to begin the season and paired him with Kevin Scott.

In Week 4, he set a season-high with eight combined tackles (five solo) and made one pass deflection as the Lions defeated the Phoenix Cardinals 26–20. In Week 7, Crockett set a season-high with seven solo tackles and made one pass break-up during a 30–10 win against the Seattle Seahawks. On January 2, 1994, Crockett recorded five combined tackles (four solo), made one pass deflection, a sack, a fumble recovery, and intercepted a pass Brett Favre threw to tight end Ed West during a 30–20 win against the Green Bay Packers. He started in all 16 games throughout the 1993 NFL season and finished with 67 combined tackles (58 solo), five pass deflections, two interceptions, a fumble recovery, and one sack.

=== Denver Broncos ===
==== 1994 season ====
On March 12, 1994, the Denver Broncos signed Crockett to a four–year, $6.40 million contract that included a signing bonus of $1.20 million. He entered training camp slated as a starting cornerback under defensive coordinator Charlie Waters following the departures of Tyrone Braxton and Charles Dimry. Head coach Wade Phillips named Crockett the No. 1 starting cornerback to begin the season and paired him with Ben Smith.

In Week 4, Crockett recorded two solo tackles before exiting during the third quarter of a 20–27 loss at the Buffalo Bills after injuring his ankle. He remained inactive for the next two games (Weeks 6–7) due to a sprained ankle. In Week 8, he recorded six solo tackles, two pass deflections, and had his first interception as a member of the Broncos, picking off Stan Humphries’ pass to Ronnie Harmon during a 20–15 victory at the San Diego Chargers. On November 13, 1994, he recorded four solo tackles and set a season-high with five pass deflections as the Broncos defeated the Seattle Seahawks 17–10. On November 27, 1994, Crockett set a season-high with eight combined tackles (seven solo), made one pass deflection, and intercepted a pass Jeff Blake threw to wide receiver Carl Pickens during a 13–15 win against the Cincinnati Bengals. On December 30, 1994, the Denver Broncos fired head coach Wade Phillips after they finished the 1994 NFL season with a 7–9 record. He finished the season with 64 combined tackles (58 solo), 19 pass deflections, two fumble recoveries, and two interceptions in 14 games and 14 starts.

==== 1995 season ====
On February 1, 1995, the Denver Broncos hired Mike Shanahan to be their new head coach. Defensive coordinator Greg Robinson retained Crockett as the No. 1 starting cornerback to begin the season and paired him with Lionel Washington.

In Week 8, he set a season-high with eight combined tackles (seven solo) and made one pass deflection during a 7–21 loss against the Kansas City Chiefs. On December 17, 1994, Crockett made seven combined tackles (six solo), a pass deflection, and scored a touchdown after he had a strip/sack on Steve Bono and returned the fumble recovery for a 50–yard touchdown during a 17–20 loss at the Kansas City Chiefs. The following week, he set a season-high with three pass deflections during a 31–28 victory at the Los Angeles Raiders in Week 17. He started in all 16 games throughout the season and recorded 72 combined tackles (60 solo), 19 pass deflections, three sacks, a fumble recovery, a forced fumble, and one touchdown.

==== 1996 season ====
The Denver Broncos selected cornerback Tory James in the second round (44th overall) of the 1996 NFL draft. Crockett returned to training camp slated as the No. 1 starting cornerback. Head coach Mike Shanahan retained Crockett and Lionel Washington as the starting cornerbacks to begin the season. On October 27, 1996, Crockett recorded three solo tackles, set a season-high with three pass deflections, and intercepted a pass Steve Bono threw to wide receiver Danan Hughes as the Broncos routed the Kansas City Chiefs 7–34. On December 15, 1996, Crockett set a season-high with eight combined tackles (seven solo), made one pass deflection, and secured a 19–24 win against the Oakland Raiders by intercepting a pass Billy Joe Hobert threw to wide receiver Daryl Hobbs late in the fourth quarter. He finished the season with 58 combined tackles (52 solo), 15 pass deflections, two interceptions, two forced fumbles, and set a career-high with four sacks in 15 games and 15 starts.

The Denver Broncos finished the 1996 NFL season first in the AFC West with a 13–3 record to earn a first round bye. On January 4, 1997, Crockett started in the AFC Divisional Round and recorded two solo tackles as the Broncos lost 27–30 to the upstart Jacksonville Jaguars.

==== 1997 season ====
He entered training camp slated as the de facto No. 1 starting cornerback following the departure of Lionel Washington. During the preseason, projected No. 2 starting cornerback Tory James tore his patellar tendon and was placed on injured reserve for the entire season. Head coach Mike Shanahan named Crockett and newly signed free agent Darrien Gordon the starting cornerbacks to begin the season.

On September 14, 1997, Crockett recorded three solo tackles, set a season-high with five pass deflections, and intercepted a pass by Tony Banks as the Broncos defeated the St. Louis Rams 14–35. On November 9, 1997, Crockett made four combined tackles (three solo), two pass deflections, and set a season-high with two interceptions on pass attempts thrown by Kerry Collins as the Broncos routed the Carolina Panthers 0–34. In Week 10, he set a season-high with ten combined tackles (seven solo) and made two pass deflections during a 30–27 victory against the Seattle Seahawks. He started in all 16 games throughout the season and had a total of 82 combined tackles (68 solo), 20 pass deflections, four interceptions, and one forced fumble.

The Denver Broncos finished the 1997 NFL season first in the AFC West with a 12–4 record to clinch a playoff berth. They avenged their playoff elimination from the previous season and easily defeated the Jacksonville Jaguars 42–17 in the AFC Wild-Card Game and followed with a 14–10 victory at the Kansas City Chiefs in the Divisional Round. On January 11, 1998, Crockett started in the AFC Championship Game and recorded eight solo tackles, two pass deflections, a sack, and intercepted a pass Kordell Stewart threw to wide receiver Yancey Thigpen during a 24–21 victory at the Pittsburgh Steelers. On January 25, 1998, Crockett started in Super Bowl XXXII and recorded six solo tackles and made one pass deflection as the Broncos defeated the Green Bay Packers 31–24. Crockett earned his first of two Super Bowl rings.

==== 1998 season ====
On February 12, 1998, the Denver Broncos re-signed Crockett to a five–year, $14.50 million contract that included an initial signing bonus of $3.30 million. He returned as the No. 1 starting cornerback and started alongside Darrien Gordon throughout the season.

In Week 2, Crockett set a season-high with eight solo tackles as the Broncos defeated the Dallas Cowboys 42–23. On September 20, 1998, Crockett made five solo tackles, two pass deflections, set a season-high with two interceptions, and returned one for a touchdown during a 34–17 victory at the Oakland Raiders. During the fourth quarter, he intercepted a pass Jeff George threw to Tim Brown and returned it 80–yards for a touchdown. In Week 12, he recorded two solo tackles, made one pass deflection, and secured a victory against the Oakland Raiders by intercepting Donald Hollas in the fourth quarter as the Broncos were leading 14–20. It would be the first of three fourth quarter interceptions by the Broncos, leading to a 14–40 victory. He started in all 16 games for the second consecutive season and finished with a total of 53 combined tackles (46 solo), 13 pass deflections, three interceptions, and scored one touchdown.

The Denver Broncos finished the 1998 NFL season first in the AFC West division with a 14–2 record to clinch a first-round bye and home-field advantage. They began the playoffs by defeating the Miami Dolphins 38–3 in the Divisional Round. On January 17, 1999, Crockett started in the AFC Championship Game and recorded six combined tackles (four solo) and made one pass deflection as the Broncos defeated the New York Jets 23–10 to advance to their second consecutive Super Bowl. On January 31, 1999, Crockett started in Super Bowl XXXIII and recorded five solo tackles during a 34–19 victory against the Atlanta Falcons.

==== 1999 season ====
He returned to training camp slated as the No. 1 starting cornerback following the departure of Darrien Gordon. Head coach Mike Shanahan named Crockett and Dale Carter the starting cornerbacks to begin the season. During nickelback situations, Crockett would be moved to cover the slot receiver with Tory James replacing him outside. On October 3, 1999, Crockett made three solo tackles, one pass deflection, a sack, and intercepted a pass Rick Mirer threw to wide receiver Dedric Ward during a 21–13 loss to the New York Jets. In Week 11, he set a season-high with ten combined tackles (nine solo), made one pass deflection, and had a forced fumble during a 27–21 overtime victory against the Oakland Raiders. He started in all 16 games for the third season in-a-row and finished with a total of 64 combined tackles (61 solo), ten pass deflections, two sacks, two forced fumbles, a fumble recovery, and made two interceptions. The Denver Broncos finished the 1999 NFL season with a 6–10 record due to the retirement of John Elway and season-ending injuries to running back Terrell Davis and tight end Shannon Sharpe.

==== 2000 season ====
On April 5, 2000, starting cornerback Dale Carter was suspended for the entire 2000 NFL season by the NFL after his third violation of the NFL’s substance abuse policy. During free agency, Tory James departed to join the Oakland Raiders. The Denver Broncos subsequently selected cornerback Deltha O'Neal in the first round (15th overall) of the 2000 NFL draft and signed unrestricted free agent Jimmy Spencer. On July 21, 2000, the Broncos signed cornerback Terrell Buckley. Head coach Mike Shanahan named Crockett and Terrell Buckley as the starting cornerbacks to begin the season and had Deltha O’Neal as the primary backup.

In Week 3, he set a season-high with seven combined tackles (five solo) and made one pass deflection during a 33–24 victory at the Oakland Raiders. On September 24, 2000, Crockett recorded four solo tackles, set a season-high with four pass deflections, set another season-high with two interceptions, and returned one for a touchdown during a 23–22 loss to the Kansas City Chiefs. During the second quarter, Crockett intercepted a pass Elvis Grbac threw to wide receiver Derrick Alexander and returned it 26–yards for a touchdown. In Week 12, Crockett recorded four solo tackles before exiting during the third quarter of a 38–37 win against the San Diego Chargers due to a hamstring injury. He remained inactive for the next three games (Weeks 13–15) due to a strained hamstring. He finished the 2000 NFL season with a total of 46 combined tackles (43 solo), 12 pass deflections, four interceptions, and a touchdown in 13 games and 13 starts.

=== Kansas City Chiefs ===
==== 2001 season ====
On April 5, 2001, the Kansas City Chiefs signed Crockett to a six–year, $21.50 million contract that included an initial signing bonus of $2.50 million. He was reunited with former Denver Broncos’ defensive coordinator Greg Robinson. Entering training camp, Crockett was slated as the No. 1 starting cornerback following the departure of James Hasty. Head coach Dick Vermeil named Crockett and Eric Warfield the starting cornerbacks to begin the season.

On September 23, 2001, Crockett recorded three solo tackles, set a season-high with three pass deflections, and intercepted a pass by Kerry Collins during a 13–3 loss to the New York Giants. He was inactive for two games (Weeks 6–7) after breaking his right hand. In Week 16, Crockett set a season-high with six solo tackles during a 30–26 victory at the Jacksonville Jaguars. He finished the 2001 NFL season with a total of 45 combined tackles (41 solo), nine pass deflections, and one interception in 14 games and 12 starts.

==== 2002 season ====
Throughout training camp, he competed against Eric Warfield and William Bartee to retain his role as a starting cornerback. Head coach Dick Vermeil named Crockett a backup and listed him as the starting nickelback to begin the season, behind Eric Warfield and William Bartee. He was inactive as the Chiefs defeated the Miami Dolphins 48–30 in Week 4 due to a hamstring injury. In Week 8, Crockett set a season-high with nine combined tackles (eight solo) and made one pass deflection as the Chiefs defeated the Oakland Raiders 20–10. On December 1, 2002, Crockett recorded three solo tackles, set a season-high with four pass deflections, and set a season-high with two interceptions off passes thrown by Jake Plummer as the Chiefs routed the Arizona Cardinals 0–49. He finished the 2002 NFL season with 45 combined tackles (39 solo), ten pass deflections, one sack, and two interceptions in 15 games and five starts.

On June 3, 2003, the Kansas City Chiefs released Crockett with four years remaining on his contract.

== Post-playing career ==
=== Media ===
In 2005, he co-starred (with Dick Butkus) in the ESPN reality show Bound for Glory, in which they both took on the task of coaching a high school football team.

He appeared on the NBC game show Identity, as one of the twelve people whose identity the contestant had to guess. The contestant correctly identified him as a football player.

In 2008, he collaborated with Morgan Spurlock (creator of the show 30 Days and the popular film Super Size Me) to be on an episode of 30 Days. In the episode, Crockett spent 30 days using a wheelchair to get around. He chose to be on the show after witnessing a paralyzing injury of former Detroit Lions teammate Mike Utley in 1991. The rapper and producer Birdman is seen wearing his jersey in the music video of the song "I made it" by Kevin Rudolf featuring Lil' Wayne, Jaysean and Birdman.

=== Other work ===
In 2019, he joined Your EFO "Your Championship Tax Office" and is currently the VP of Operations. Crockett lives in Dallas, Texas and works as a youth football coach for a middle school football team.
