= Bobby Turner =

American football coach (born 1949)

San Francisco 49ers
- Title: Running backs coach

Personal information
- Born: May 6, 1949 (age 77); Midway, Alabama, U.S.

Career information
- High school: Washington (East Chicago, Indiana)
- College: Indiana State
- NFL draft: 1972: undrafted

Career history
- Kokomo (IN) Haworth (1972–1974) Assistant coach; Indiana State (1975–1982); Running backs and quarterbacks coach & strength and conditioning coordinator (1975); Defensive backs coach & strength and conditioning coordinator (1976–1977); Running backs coach & special teams coordinator (1978–1981); Defensive backs coach & special teams coordinator (1982); Fresno State (1983–1988) Running backs coach; Ohio State (1989–1990) Running backs coach; Purdue (1991–1994) Assistant head coach & offensive coordinator & running backs coach; Denver Broncos (1995–2009) Running backs coach; Washington Redskins (2010–2013) Assistant head coach & running backs coach; Atlanta Falcons (2015–2016) Running backs coach; San Francisco 49ers (2017–present) Running backs coach

Awards and highlights
- 2× Super Bowl champion (XXXII, XXXIII)

Robert Turner Jr. (born May 6, 1949) is an American professional football coach who is the running backs coach for the San Francisco 49ers. Since first joining the NFL in 1995, he has worked exclusively on the staffs of Mike Shanahan during his time with the Denver Broncos and Washington Redskins and then his son Kyle with the Atlanta Falcons and San Francisco 49ers, with the lone exception of serving under Josh McDaniels in his last season with the Broncos in 2009 before reuniting with Mike Shanahan with the Washington Redskins in 2010.

== Coaching career ==
=== Early coaching career ===
Early in his coaching days, Turner worked as an assistant football and basketball coach at Kokomo, Indiana's Haworth High School from 1972 to 1974.

=== College coaching ===
He moved to the college ranks in 1975, working for the Indiana State University football program in various roles until 1982.

In 1983, he went to Fresno State University, where he was the team's running backs coach through 1988. One of the players he coached was future coach Kelly Skipper.

Turner was the running backs coach at Ohio State University from 1989 to 1990; in this period, the Buckeyes reached bowl games in both seasons and had the top rushing game in the Big Ten Conference in 1989. In 1990, he coached running backs Robert Smith, Butler By'not'e, and Raymont Harris.

In his final collegiate coaching stop before moving to the NFL, Turner served as assistant head coach, offensive coordinator and running backs coach at Purdue University from 1991 to 1994. While at Purdue, he coached RB Mike Alstott.

=== Denver Broncos ===
From 1995 to 2009 Turner was the running backs coach for the Denver Broncos. During his time at Denver, the Broncos won two Super Bowls (Super Bowls XXXII and XXXIII), 2 AFC championships (1997 and 1998) and three AFC West titles (1996, 1998, and 2005), and went to the playoffs seven times (1996–98, 1997 and 2000 as AFC Wild Cards, and 2003–05, 2003 and 2004 being AFC Wild Cards). During his 15 seasons at Denver, six different running backs rushed for at least 1,000 yards in a single season: Terrell Davis (four times: 1995–98), Olandis Gary (1999), Mike Anderson (twice: 2000, 2005), Clinton Portis (twice: 2002, 2003), Reuben Droughns (2004), and Tatum Bell (2006).

=== Washington Redskins ===
In 2010, Turner was hired to be the running backs coach by his former colleague, Mike Shanahan, after Mike was selected to be the new head coach of the Washington Redskins.

=== Atlanta Falcons ===
On February 3, 2015, Dan Quinn announced that Turner would be his running backs coach.

In the 2016 season, Turner and the Falcons reached Super Bowl LI, where they lost to the New England Patriots, 34–28 in overtime.

=== San Francisco 49ers ===
In 2017, Turner became the running backs coach for the 49ers under head coach Kyle Shanahan.

== Personal life ==
Turner grew up in East Chicago, Indiana, and attended EC's Washington High School, where he was a multi-sport athlete. He played basketball for Johnnie Baratto. He graduated from Indiana State University.
