= 1998 Denver Broncos season =

American football team season

- Owner: Pat Bowlen
- General manager: John Beake and Mike Shanahan
- President: Pat Bowlen
- Head coach: Mike Shanahan
- Home stadium: Mile High Stadium

Results
- Record: 14–2
- Division place: 1st AFC West
- Playoffs: Won Divisional Playoffs (vs. Dolphins) 38–3; Won AFC Championship (vs. Jets) 23–10; Won Super Bowl XXXIII (vs. Falcons) 34–19
- All-Pros: RB Terrell Davis (1st team); TE Shannon Sharpe (1st team); WR Ed McCaffrey (2nd team); K Jason Elam (2nd team)
- Pro Bowlers: QB John Elway; RB Terrell Davis; WR Ed McCaffrey; TE Shannon Sharpe; T Tony Jones; G Mark Schlereth; C Tom Nalen; OLB Bill Romanowski; FS Steve Atwater; K Jason Elam

The 1998 season was the Denver Broncos' 29th in the National Football League (NFL) and their 39th overall. The Broncos entered the season as the defending Super Bowl champions and looked to become only the fifth team in league history to win consecutive Super Bowls.

Finishing with a record of 12–4 the previous year, the Broncos improved on that mark by two wins and tied the Atlanta Falcons for second best record at 14–2. They won their first thirteen games, the best start since the unbeaten 1972 Dolphins.

After 16 seasons, John Elway retired following the Super Bowl. He finished his Broncos career with 51,475 yards passing and 300 touchdowns. Until Peyton Manning won in Super Bowl 50, Elway stood as the only Broncos quarterback to win a Super Bowl. However, Elway even played a large role in that victory as the general manager and president of football operations for the Broncos.

Running back Terrell Davis set a team single season rushing mark. His final total was 2,008 yards, making him only the fourth player to rush for over 2,000 yards in single season.

A multi-year investigation from 2001 to 2005 revealed that between 1996 and 1998, the team had circumvented the salary cap by deferring other money to Elway and Davis outside of the team’s salary. Denver claimed it gave them no competitive advantage. The NFL did not issue any official statements but the team was subsequently fined nearly $2 million and were forced to give up two third-round picks in the 2002 and 2005 drafts.

In 2007, the 1998 Broncos were ranked as the 12th greatest Super Bowl champions on the NFL Network's documentary series America's Game: The Super Bowl Champions. They ranked #14 on the 100 greatest teams of all time presented by the NFL on its 100th anniversary.

== Offseason ==
Additions	Subtractions
LB Seth Joyner (Packers)	T Gary Zimmerman (Retired)
	G Brian Habib (Seahawks)

=== NFL draft ===
1998 Denver Broncos draft
Round	Pick	Player	Position	College	Notes
1	30	Marcus Nash	Wide receiver	Tennessee	
2	61	Eric Brown	Safety	Mississippi State	
3	91	Brian Griese *	Quarterback	Michigan	
4	122	Curtis Alexander	Running back	Alabama	
5	153	Chris Howard	Running back	Michigan	
7	200	Trey Teague	Center	Tennessee	
7	219	Nate Wayne	Linebacker	Ole Miss	
Made roster * Made at least one Pro Bowl during career

== Staff ==
1998 Denver Broncos staff
Front office: President and chief executive officer – Pat Bowlen; Vice-president of business operations – Joe Ellis (hired Sep 1, 1998); General manager – John Beake; Director of player personnel – Neal Dahlen; Director of pro scouting – Jack Elway; Director of college scouting – Ted Sundquist; College scouting consultant – Jerry Frei; Head coaches: Head coach – Mike Shanahan; Assistant head coach/offensive line – Alex Gibbs; Offensive coaches: Offensive coordinator/quarterbacks – Gary Kubiak; Running backs – Bobby Turner; Wide receivers – Mike Heimerdinger; Tight ends – Brian Pariani; Assistant offensive line/Assistant Strength and Conditioning – Barney Chavous; Offensive assistant – Ricky Porter	Defensive coaches: Defensive coordinator – Greg Robinson; Defensive line – George Dyer; Linebackers – Frank Bush; Defensive backs – Ed Donatell; Defensive assistant – Pat McPherson; Defensive assistant – Rick Smith; Pass rush specialist – John Teerlinck; Special teams coaches: Special teams – Rick Dennison; Strength and conditioning: Strength and conditioning – Rich Tuten; Assistant strength and conditioning – Greg Saporta

== Roster ==
1998 Denver Broncos roster
Quarterbacks (QB): 6 Bubby Brister; 7 John Elway*; 14 Brian Griese; Running backs (RB): 30 Terrell Davis*; 29 Howard Griffith FB*; 22 Vaughn Hebron KR; 31 Derek Loville; 37 Anthony Lynn; 42 Detron Smith FB; Wide receivers (WR): 83 Justin Armour; 85 Willie Green; 87 Ed McCaffrey*; 82 Marcus Nash; 80 Rod Smith*; Tight ends (TE): 89 Dwayne Carswell; 86 Byron Chamberlain; 84 Shannon Sharpe*	Offensive linemen (OL): 79 Chris Banks G; 63 David Diaz-Infante C/G/LS; 60 KC Jones C; 77 Tony Jones T*; 78 Matt Lepsis T; 66 Tom Nalen C*; 62 Dan Neil G*; 69 Mark Schlereth G*; 74 Harry Swayne T*; 70 Trey Teague C/T; Defensive linemen (DL): 73 Cyron Brown DE; 96 Harald Hasselbach DE/DT; 97 Mike Lodish DT; 93 Trevor Pryce DT*; 90 Neil Smith DE*; 98 Maa Tanuvasa DE*; 94 Keith Traylor NT*; 95 Marvin Washington DE/DT; 91 Alfred Williams DE	Linebackers (LB): 56 Keith Burns MLB; 59 Glenn Cadrez* MLB; 99 Seth Joyner OLB; 51 John Mobley* OLB; 53 Bill Romanowski* OLB; 54 Nate Wayne OLB; Defensive backs (DB): 27 Steve Atwater FS*; 34 Tyrone Braxton SS; 26 Eric Brown SS*; 48 George Coghill FS; 39 Ray Crockett CB*; 21 Darrien Gordon CB/PR*; 20 Tory James CB; 25 Darrius Johnson CB; 28 Tito Paul CB; Special teams (ST): 1 Jason Elam K; 16 Tom Rouen P	Practice squad: 40 Curtis Alexander RB; 15 Andre Cooper WR; 93 Joseph Daniels DT; -- Vili Maumau DT; 38 Tori Noel S; 92 Marvin Thomas DE; Reserve: 49 Chris Gizzi LB (Military Reserve.); 8 Jeff Lewis QB (PUP); 58 Steve Russ LB (IR); 53 active, 3 inactive, 5 practice squad Rookies in italics

== Season summary ==
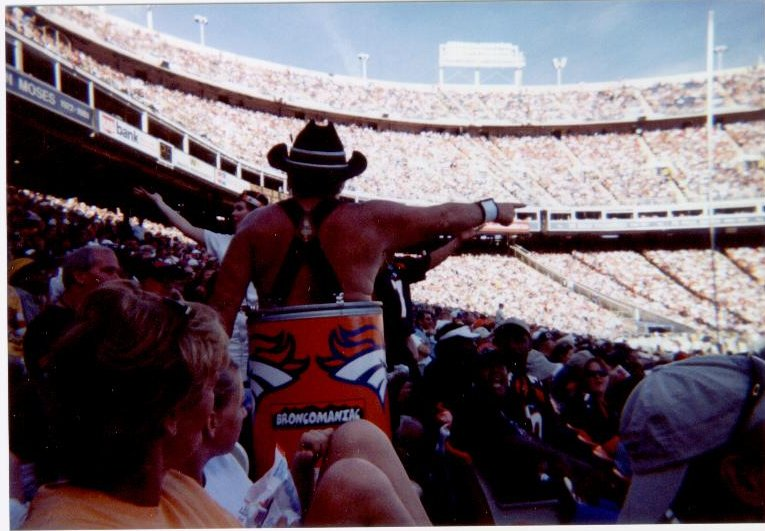
The Denver superfan Barrel Man seen at the regular season opener at Mile High Stadium against New England

The Broncos won their first 13 games of the season. There was much speculation that they might finish 19–0 and the Broncos were featured on the cover of Sports Illustrated. However, they were upset by the New York Giants (who would end another attempt at a 19–0 season nine seasons later) in week 15 by a score of 20–16. They finished the regular season 14–2 after losing to the Dolphins in their first encounter with that team since 1985.

They finished first in the AFC West and won their divisional playoff game against the Miami Dolphins 38–3 for their first win over the Dolphins since 1968. They then won the AFC Championship over the Bill Parcells coached New York Jets 23–10 after coming back from a 10–0 deficit. Many had expected Denver to play the Minnesota Vikings, the team with the number one record that year at 15–1, in the Super Bowl. However, the Vikings lost the NFC Championship Game to the Atlanta Falcons in overtime.

The Broncos defeated the Falcons 34–19 in Super Bowl XXXIII. Elway was the Super Bowl MVP and Davis rushed for over 100 yards. It was Elway's last game, and Denver would not reach the Super Bowl again until the 2013 season.

== Preseason ==
Week	Date	Opponent	Result	Record	Venue	Attendance	Recap
1	August 8	at St. Louis Rams	W 20–13	1–0	Trans World Dome	53,842	Recap
2	August 14	New Orleans Saints	W 17–10	2–0	Mile High Stadium	75,329	Recap
3	August 24	Green Bay Packers	W 34–31	3–0	Mile High Stadium	73,183	Recap
4	August 29	at Tennessee Oilers	L 13–16	3–1	Vanderbilt Stadium	33,194	Recap

== Regular season ==
=== Schedule ===
Week	Date	Opponent	Result	Record	Venue	Attendance
1	September 7	New England Patriots	**W** 27–21	1–0	Mile High Stadium	74,745
2	September 13	Dallas Cowboys	**W** 42–23	2–0	Mile High Stadium	75,013
3	September 20	at **Oakland Raiders**	**W** 34–17	3–0	Oakland–Alameda County Coliseum	56,578
4	September 27	at Washington Redskins	**W** 38–16	4–0	FedExField	71,880
5	October 4	Philadelphia Eagles	**W** 41–16	5–0	Mile High Stadium	73,218
6	October 11	at **Seattle Seahawks**	**W** 21–16	6–0	Kingdome	66,258
7	Bye					
8	October 25	Jacksonville Jaguars	**W** 37–24	7–0	Mile High Stadium	75,217
9	November 1	at Cincinnati Bengals	**W** 33–26	8–0	Cinergy Field	59,974
10	November 8	**San Diego Chargers**	**W** 27–10	9–0	Mile High Stadium	74,925
11	November 16	at **Kansas City Chiefs**	**W** 30–7	10–0	Arrowhead Stadium	78,100
12	November 22	**Oakland Raiders**	**W** 40–14	11–0	Mile High Stadium	75,325
13	November 29	at **San Diego Chargers**	**W** 31–16	12–0	Qualcomm Stadium	66,532
14	December 6	**Kansas City Chiefs**	**W** 35–31	13–0	Mile High Stadium	74,962
15	December 13	at New York Giants	**L** 16–20	13–1	Giants Stadium	72,336
16	December 21	at Miami Dolphins	**L** 21–31	13–2	Pro Player Stadium	74,363
17	December 27	**Seattle Seahawks**	**W** 28–21	14–2	Mile High Stadium	74,057
Note: Intra-division opponents are in **bold** text.

=== Standings ===
AFC West
	W	L	T	PCT	PF	PA	STK
^{(1)} Denver Broncos	14	2	0	.875	501	309	W1
Oakland Raiders	8	8	0	.500	288	356	L1
Seattle Seahawks	8	8	0	.500	372	310	L1
Kansas City Chiefs	7	9	0	.438	327	363	W1
San Diego Chargers	5	11	0	.313	241	342	L5

== Playoffs ==
Round	Date	Opponent	Result	Record	Venue	Attendance
Divisional	January 9, 1999	Miami Dolphins	W 38–3	1–0	Mile High Stadium	75,729
AFC Championship	January 17, 1999	New York Jets	W 23–10	2–0	Mile High Stadium	75,482
Super Bowl XXXIII	January 31, 1999	Atlanta Falcons	W 34–19	3–0	Pro Player Stadium	74,803

=== AFC Divisional Game vs. Miami Dolphins ===
AFC Divisional Playoff: Miami Dolphins vs Denver Broncos – Game summary

Quarter	1	2	3	4	Total
Dolphins	0	3	0	0	3
Broncos	14	7	3	14	38

at Mile High Stadium, Denver, Colorado

- Date: January 9, 1999
- Game time: 2:15 p.m. MDT
- Game weather: 29 °F or −1.7 °C, relative humidity 62%, wind 14 miles per hour (23 km/h; 12 kn)
- TV announcers (CBS): Greg Gumbel, Phil Simms, and Armen Keteyian

Game information

First quarter

- Den – Terrell Davis 1 yard rush (Jason Elam kick) Broncos 7–0
- Den – Terrell Davis 20 yard rush (Jason Elam kick) Broncos 14–0

Second quarter

- Mia – Olindo Mare 22 yard field goal. Broncos 14–3
- Den – Derek Loville 11 yard rush (Jason Elam kick) Broncos 21–3

Third quarter

- Den – Jason Elam 32 yard field goal Broncos 24–3

Fourth quarter

- Den – Rod Smith 28 yard pass from John Elway (Jason Elam kick) Broncos 31–3
- Den – Neil Smith 79 yard fumble return (Jason Elam kick) Broncos 38–3

Dolphins

- Dan Marino. 26–37, 243 yards, 0 TD, 2 Int

Broncos

- John Elway. 14–23, 182 yards, 1 TD, 0 Int
- Terrell Davis. 21 rush, 199 yards, 2 TD

Turnovers:

- Dolphins – 3
- Broncos – 0

=== AFC Championship game vs. New York Jets ===
AFC Championship game: New York Jets at Denver Broncos – Game summary

Quarter	1	2	3	4	Total
Jets	0	3	7	0	10
Broncos	0	0	20	3	23

at Mile High Stadium, Denver, Colorado

- Date: January 17, 1999
- Game time: 2:05 p.m. MDT
- Game weather: 37 °F or 2.8 °C, relative humidity 36%, wind 20 miles per hour (32 km/h; 17 kn)
- TV announcers (CBS): Greg Gumbel, Phil Simms, Armen Keteyian, and Bonnie Bernstein

Game information

First quarter

- no scoring

Second quarter

- NYJ – John Hall 32 yard field goal. Jets 3–0

Third quarter

- NYJ – Curtis Martin 1 yard rush (John Hall kick) Jets 10–0
- Den – Howard Griffith 11 yard pass from John Elway (Jason Elam kick) Jets 10–7
- Den – Jason Elam 44 yard field goal. Tie 10–10
- Den – Jason Elam 48 yard field goal. Broncos 13–10
- Den – Terrell Davis 31 yard rush (Jason Elam kick) Broncos 20–10

Fourth quarter

- Den – Jason Elam 35 yard field goal Broncos 23–10

Jets

- Vinny Testaverde. 31–56, 356 yards, 0 TD, 2 Int
- Wayne Chrebet. 8 rec, 121 yards

Broncos

- John Elway. 13–34, 173 yards, 1 TD, 0 Int
- Terrell Davis. 32 rush, 167 yards, 1 TD

Turnovers:

- Jets – 6
- Broncos – 0

Despite a subpar performance from quarterback John Elway, the Broncos came from a ten-point deficit to score twenty three unanswered points, thanks in large part to the Jets turning the ball over an astonishing six times. Broncos go to Super Bowl XXXIII and win to the Falcons 34–19.

=== Super Bowl XXXIII: vs. Atlanta Falcons ===
Super Bowl XXXIII: Denver Broncos vs Atlanta Falcons – Game summary

Quarter	1	2	3	4	Total
Broncos	7	10	0	17	34
Falcons	3	3	0	13	19

at Pro Player Stadium, Miami, Florida

- Date: January 31, 1999
- Game time: 6:30 p.m. EST
- Game weather: 74 °F or 23.3 °C, relative humidity 67%, wind 11 miles per hour (18 km/h; 9.6 kn)
- TV announcers (Fox): Pat Summerall, John Madden, Ron Pitts, and Bill Maas

The Denver Broncos become the third team in the last 9 years to repeat as Super Bowl champions, along with the San Francisco 49ers and the Dallas Cowboys. John Elway was voted Super Bowl MVP.

== Statistics ==
=== Team stats ===
The Broncos had 3,808 yards passing, sixth in the league. They had 2,468 yards rushing, second in the league and 26 rushing touchdowns, first in the league. They had 6,276 total yards, third best.

They gave up 3,983 passing yards, a low 28 out of 30 in the NFL, but were third in rushing yards given up with 1,287. They gave up 5,270 yards, 12th in the NFL. They scored 501 points, second in the league and gave up 309, eighth fewest in the league.

The Broncos’ 14–2 record remains their best regular season record (most wins and equal fewest losses) in franchise history.

=== Player stats ===
For the season Elway threw for 2,806 yards, 22 touchdowns and ten interceptions. Davis rushed for 2,008 yards and 21 touchdowns. Rod Smith had 86 receptions for 1,222 yards and six touchdowns. Ed McCaffrey had 64 receptions for 1,053 yards. Shannon Sharpe had 64 receptions for 768 yards. Jason Elam kicked 23 out of 27 field goals and 58 out of 58 extra points including a 63-yard field goal to tie Tom Dempsey with the longest field goal in NFL history at that time. This record has since been eclipsed by another Denver Bronco in Matt Prater, and once again by Justin Tucker.

Steve Atwater, Davis, Elway, Tony Jones, Mark Schlereth, McCaffrey, Tom Nalen, Bill Romanowski, and Sharpe made the Pro Bowl.

== Awards and records ==
- Terrell Davis, NFL MVP
- Terrell Davis, Franchise Record, Most Rushing Yards in One Season, 2,008 Yards
- Terrell Davis, Franchise Record, Most Touchdowns in One Season, 23 Touchdowns
- John Elway, Super Bowl MVP
- Jason Elam, tied longest field goal (63 yards)

=== Milestones ===
- Terrell Davis, 1st 2,000-yard rushing season, 2,008 Yards
