= 1998 Atlanta Falcons season =

33rd season in franchise history; first Super Bowl appearance

- Owner: Taylor Smith
- General manager: Harold Richardson
- Head coach: Dan Reeves; Rich Brooks (weeks 16–17)
- Home stadium: Georgia Dome

Results
- Record: 14–2
- Division place: 1st NFC West
- Playoffs: Won Divisional Playoffs (vs. 49ers) 20–18; Won NFC Championship Game (at Vikings) 30–27 (OT); Lost Super Bowl XXXIII (vs. Broncos) 19–34
- Pro Bowlers: QB Chris Chandler; RB Jamal Anderson; LB Jessie Tuggle; CB Ray Buchanan; S Eugene Robinson

The 1998 Atlanta Falcons season was the franchise's 33rd in the National Football League (NFL). The Falcons qualified for the Super Bowl for the first time under the guidance of head coach Dan Reeves in his second year with the team, becoming the first dome team to play in a Super Bowl. The Falcons won their final nine regular season games to earn the #2 seed in the National Football Conference (NFC) for the postseason and the first-week bye. They also clinched their first NFC West title since 1980. They beat the San Francisco 49ers in the divisional round and the #1-seed Minnesota Vikings in the NFC Championship Game before losing to Reeves’ old team, the Denver Broncos, 34–19 in Super Bowl XXXIII. They were a perfect 8–0 at home.

Head coach Dan Reeves almost didn't make it to the end of the season. After Week 15, he was diagnosed with multiple blockages to his coronary arteries, necessitating quadruple bypass surgery. Reeves admitted he ignored the warning signs in hopes of finishing the season, but ultimately felt he needed to be checked out. Doctors stated by the time he went for treatment, he may have been “within hours of a catastrophic heart attack.” Defensive coordinator Rich Brooks substituted for him as head coach during Weeks 16 and 17. Reeves returned for the playoffs and finished the season.

The Falcons ranked fourth in the league in points scored (442 points) and surrendered the fourth-fewest points (289) in 1998; the Falcons also led the league in turnover differential at +20. The Falcons set a still-standing team record for point differential, with +153. Four of the Falcons' wins were by at least 22 points.

== Offseason ==
=== NFL draft ===
1998 Atlanta Falcons draft
Round	Pick	Player	Position	College	Notes
1	12	Keith Brooking *	Linebacker	Georgia Tech	
2	53	Bob Hallen	Center	Kent State	
3	74	Jammi German	Wide receiver	Miami (FL)	
4	103	Omar Brown	Defensive back	North Carolina	
4	114	Tim Dwight	Wide receiver	Iowa	
6	166	Elijah Williams	Defensive back	Florida	
7	199	Ephraim Salaam	Offensive tackle	San Diego State	
7	201	Ken Oxendine	Running back	Virginia Tech	
7	203	Henry Slay	Defensive tackle	West Virginia	
Made roster * Made at least one Pro Bowl during career

=== Undrafted free agents ===
1998 undrafted free agents of note
Player	Position	College
Brian Brennan	Quarterback	Idaho

== Personnel ==
1998 Atlanta Falcons staff
Front office: President – Taylor Smith; Executive vice-president of football operations – Dan Reeves; General manager – Harold Richardson; Vice-president of football operations – Ron Hill; Director of player personnel/College – Reed Johnson; Director of player personnel/Pro – Chuck Connor; Assistant to head coach/pro personnel – Marvin Bass; Head coaches: Head coach – Dan Reeves; Assistant head coach/defensive coordinator – Rich Brooks; Offensive coaches: Offensive coordinator/running backs – George Sefcik; Quarterbacks – Jack Burns; Wide receivers – Rennie Simmons; Tight ends – James Daniel; Offensive line – Art Shell; Offensive quality control – Ed West	Defensive coaches: Defensive line – Bill Kollar; Linebackers – Don Blackmon; Secondary – Ron Meeks; Defensive quality control – Brian Xanders; Special teams coaches: Special teams – Joe DeCamillis; Strength and conditioning: Strength and conditioning – Al Miller; Assistant strength and conditioning – Tim Jorgensen

== Roster ==
1998 Atlanta Falcons roster
Quarterbacks (QB): 12 Chris Chandler; 17 Steve DeBerg; 13 Tony Graziani; Running backs (RB): 32 Jamal Anderson; 45 Gary Downs; 28 Harold Green; 33 Ken Oxendine; Wide receivers (WR): 83 Tim Dwight; 82 Ronnie Harris; 89 Todd Kinchen; 80 Tony Martin; 81 Terance Mathis; Tight ends (TE): 85 Brian Kozlowski; 84 Rod Monroe; 88 O. J. Santiago; 86 Ed Smith	Offensive linemen (OL): 68 Calvin Collins G; 64 Bob Hallen G; 76 Jose Portilla T; 74 Ephraim Salaam T; 67 Adam Schreiber; 61 Robbie Tobeck C; 70 Bob Whitfield T; 79 Dave Widell C; 69 Gene Williams G; Defensive linemen (DL): 92 Lester Archambeau DE/DT; 91 John Burrough DE; 75 Shane Dronett DT; 96 Antonio Edwards DE; 98 Travis Hall DT; 90 Chuck Smith DE; 93 Shawn Swayda DE; 95 Esera Tuaolo DT	Linebackers (LB): 97 Cornelius Bennett OLB; 56 Keith Brooking OLB; 94 Henri Crockett OLB; 54 Ruffin Hamilton MLB; 52 Craig Sauer OLB; 59 Ben Talley OLB; 58 Jessie Tuggle MLB; Defensive backs (DB): 26 Darren Anderson CB; 47 Chris Bayne SS; 20 Michael Booker CB; 23 Ronnie Bradford CB; 27 Omar Brown FS; 34 Ray Buchanan CB; 25 Devin Bush FS; 29 Randy Fuller CB; 41 Eugene Robinson FS; 35 William White SS; 21 Elijah Williams CB; Special teams (ST): 5 Morten Andersen K; 4 Dan Stryzinski P	Practice squad: 16 Octavus Barnes WR; 11 Sherdrick Bonner QB; 62 Ben Huff DT; 66 Greg Studdard T; 73 Brett Williams DE; Reserve: 44 Bob Christian FB (IR); 87 Jammi German WR (IR); 24 Byron Hanspard RB (IR); 53 active, 3 inactive, 5 practice squad Rookies in italics

== Regular season ==
=== Schedule ===
Week	Date	Opponent	Result	Record	Venue	Recap
1	September 6	at **Carolina Panthers**	**W** 19–14	1–0	Ericsson Stadium	Recap
2	September 13	Philadelphia Eagles	**W** 17–12	2–0	Georgia Dome	Recap
3	Bye					
4	September 27	at **San Francisco 49ers**	**L** 20–31	2–1	Candlestick Park	Recap
5	October 4	**Carolina Panthers**	**W** 51–23	3–1	Georgia Dome	Recap
6	October 11	at New York Giants	**W** 34–20	4–1	Giants Stadium	Recap
7	October 18	**New Orleans Saints**	**W** 31–23	5–1	Georgia Dome	Recap
8	October 25	at New York Jets	**L** 3–28	5–2	Giants Stadium	Recap
9	November 1	**St. Louis Rams**	**W** 37–15	6–2	Georgia Dome	Recap
10	November 8	at New England Patriots	**W** 41–10	7–2	Foxboro Stadium	Recap
11	November 15	**San Francisco 49ers**	**W** 31–19	8–2	Georgia Dome	Recap
12	November 22	Chicago Bears	**W** 20–13	9–2	Georgia Dome	Recap
13	November 29	at **St. Louis Rams**	**W** 21–10	10–2	Trans World Dome	Recap
14	December 6	Indianapolis Colts	**W** 28–21	11–2	Georgia Dome	Recap
15	December 13	at **New Orleans Saints**	**W** 27–17	12–2	Louisiana Superdome	Recap
16	December 20	at Detroit Lions	**W** 24–17	13–2	Pontiac Silverdome	Recap
17	December 27	Miami Dolphins	**W** 38–16	14–2	Georgia Dome	Recap
Note: Intra-division opponents are in **bold** text.

=== Standings ===
NFC West
	W	L	T	PCT	PF	PA	STK
^{(2)} Atlanta Falcons	14	2	0	.875	442	289	W9
^{(4)} San Francisco 49ers	12	4	0	.750	479	328	W1
New Orleans Saints	6	10	0	.375	305	359	L3
Carolina Panthers	4	12	0	.250	336	413	W2
St. Louis Rams	4	12	0	.250	285	378	L2

=== Notable games ===
==== October 4 vs. Carolina Panthers ====
Week 5: Carolina Panthers at Atlanta Falcons

Quarter	1	2	3	4	Total
Panthers	3	0	6	14	**23**
**Falcons**	14	3	21	13	**51**

at Georgia Dome, Atlanta, Georgia

- Date: October 4, 1998
- Game time: 1:00 p.m. EST
- Game weather: None (played indoors)
- Game attendance: 50,724

Game information

**First quarter**

- ATL – Tim Dwight 93-yard kickoff return, 15:00, (Morten Andersen kick). Falcons 7–0
- ATL – Tony Martin 30-yard pass from Chris Chandler (Morten Andersen kick). Falcons 14–0
- CAR – John Kasay 28-yard field goal. Falcons 14–3

**Second quarter**

- ATL – Morten Andersen 23 yard field goal, 1:12. Falcons 17–3

**Third quarter**

- ATL – Bob Christian 1-yard rush (Morten Andersen kick). Falcons 24–3
- ATL – O.J. Santiago 26-yard pass from Chris Chandler, 6:07 (Morten Andersen kick). Falcons 31–3
- ATL – William White 18-yard defensive fumble return, 6:01 (Morten Andersen kick). Falcons 38–3
- Wesley Walls 24-yard pass from Kerry Collins (kick failed). Falcons 38–9

**Fourth quarter**

- Mark Carrier 5-yard pass from Kerry Collins (pass failed). Falcons 38–15
- ATL – Jamal Anderson 20-yard rush (Morten Andersen kick). Falcons 45–15
- Muhsin Muhammad 72-yard pass from Kerry Collins (Kerry Collins run). Falcons 45–23
- ATL – Morten Andersen 25-yard field goal. Falcons 48–23
- ATL – Morten Andersen 28-yard field goal, 0:47. Falcons 51–23

**Top passers**

- CAR – Kerry Collins – 20/38, 302 yards, 3 TD, 2 INT
- ATL – Chris Chandler – 12/20, 189 yards, 2 TD, 2 INT

**Top rushers**

- CAR – Fred Lane – 15 rushes, 48 yards
- ATL – Jamal Anderson – 31 rushes, 117 yards, TD

**Top receivers**

- CAR – Muhsin Muhammad, 4 receptions, 104 yards, TD
- ATL – Tony Martin, 4 receptions, 65 yards, TD

The Falcons' most decisive win of the season came in a 51–23 rout in the Georgia Dome. Jamal Anderson rushed for 117 yards and a touchdown while Chris Chandler threw for 189 yards and two touchdowns with two picks. From Tim Dwight’s 93-yard opening kickoff return touchdown, the Falcons never let Carolina have a sniff of contention, leading 38–3 during the third quarter before cruising home with the win.

==== October 11 at New York Giants ====
Week 6: Atlanta Falcons at New York Giants

Quarter	1	2	3	4	Total
**Falcons**	7	7	10	10	**34**
Giants	6	7	0	7	**20**

at Giants Stadium, East Rutherford, New Jersey

- Date: October 11, 1998
- Game time: 8:20 p.m. EST
- Game weather: Partly cloudy, 70 °F (21.1 °C), relative humidity 73%, wind 15 miles per hour (24 km/h; 13 kn)
- Game attendance: 71,173

Game information

**First quarter**

- NYG – Brad Daluiso 46-yard field goal. Giants 3–0
- ATL – Tony Martin 36-yard pass from Chris Chandler (Morten Andersen kick). Falcons 7–3
- NYG – Brad Daluiso 45-yard field goal. Falcons 7–6

**Second quarter**

- ATL – Antonio Edwards 2-yard defensive fumble return (Morten Andersen kick). Falcons 14–6
- NYG – David Patten 39-yard pass from Danny Kanell, 0:41 (Brad Daluiso kick). Falcons 14–13

**Third quarter**

- ATL – Morten Andersen 26-yard field goal. Falcons 17–13
- ATL — Terance Mathis 55-yard pass from Chris Chandler (Morten Andersen kick). Falcons 24–13

**Fourth quarter**

- ATL – Chris Chandler 1-yard rush (Morten Andersen kick). Falcons 31–13
- ATL – Morten Andersen 32-yard field goal. Falcons 34–13
- NYG – Kent Graham 5-yard rush (Brad Daluiso kick). Falcons 34–20

**Top passers**

- ATL – Chris Chandler – 14/27, 266 yards, 2 TD
- NYG – Kent Graham – 11/16, 105 yards

**Top rushers**

- ATL – Jamal Anderson – 29 rushes, 110 yards
- NYG – Charles Way – 11 rushes, 39 yards

**Top receivers**

- ATL – Terance Mathis, 2 receptions, 79 yards, TD
- NYG – Tiki Barber, 9 receptions, 56 yards

This was the first occasion when the Falcons played the Giants since 1988, and the teams' first meeting at Giants Stadium since 1982. This is due to old NFL scheduling formulas in place prior to 2002, whereby teams had no rotating schedule opposing members of other divisions within their own conference, but instead played interdivisional conference games according to position within a season's table.

==== October 25 at New York Jets ====
Week 8: Atlanta Falcons at New York Jets

Quarter	1	2	3	4	Total
Falcons	0	3	0	0	**3**
**Jets**	7	7	14	0	**28**

at Giants Stadium, East Rutherford, New Jersey

- Date: October 25, 1998
- Game time: 1:00 p.m. EST
- Game weather: 65 °F (18.3 °C), relative humidity 46%, wind 11 miles per hour (18 km/h; 9.6 kn)
- Game attendance: 71,573

Game information

**First quarter**

- NYJ – Curtis Martin 2-yard rush (John Hall kick). Jets 7–0

**Second quarter**

- NYJ – Jerome Henderson 53-yard defensive fumble return (John Hall kick). Jets 14–0
- ATL – Morten Andersen 53-yard field goal, 0:01. Jets 14–3

**Third quarter**

- NYJ – Keyshawn Johnson 12-yard pass from Vinny Testaverde (John Hall kick). Jets 21–3
- NYJ – Keith Byars 22-yard pass from Vinny Testaverde (John Hall kick). Jets 28–3

**Fourth quarter**

- No scoring plays

**Top passers**

- ATL – Steve DeBerg – 9/20, 117 yards, INT
- NYJ – Vinny Testaverde – 16/29, 206 yards, 2 TD

**Top rushers**

- ATL – Jamal Anderson – 19 rushes, 46 yards
- NYJ – Curtis Martin – 25 rushes, 101 yards, TD

**Top receivers**

- ATL – Bob Christian, 3 receptions, 43 yards
- NYJ – Wayne Chrebet, 4 receptions, 54 yards

With Chris Chandler having injured his shoulder, the Falcons start 44-year-old Steve DeBerg, who had last played in the NFL in 1993 and became the oldest player to start an NFL game since Bobby Marshall in 1925. Bill Belichick's Jets shut down the Falcons' powerful running game with a nine-man defensive line, and DeBerg and reserve left-hander Tony Graziani cannot cope with the Jets' pass rush.

==== November 8 at New England Patriots ====
Week 10: Atlanta Falcons at New England Patriots

Quarter	1	2	3	4	Total
**Falcons**	14	14	3	10	**41**
Patriots	3	0	7	0	**10**

at Foxboro Stadium, Foxborough, Massachusetts

- Date: November 8, 1998
- Game time: 1:00 p.m. EST
- Game weather: 44 °F (6.7 °C), relative humidity 69%, wind 9 miles per hour (14 km/h; 7.8 kn)
- Game attendance: 59,790

Game information

**First quarter**

- ATL – Jamal Anderson 1-yard rush (Morten Andersen kick). Falcons 7–0
- ATL – O.J. Santiago 7-yard pass from Chris Chandler (Morten Andersen kick). Falcons 14–0
- NWE – Adam Vinatieri 40-yard field goal. Falcons 14–3

**Second quarter**

- ATL – Jamal Anderson 10-yard rush (Morten Andersen kick). Falcons 21–3
- ATL – Chuck Smith 71-yard defensive fumble return (Morten Andersen kick). Falcons 28–3

**Third quarter**

- ATL – Morten Andersen 40-yard field goal. Falcons 31–3
- NWE – Ben Coates 2-yard pass from Drew Bledsoe (Adam Vinatieri kick). Falcons 31–10

**Fourth quarter**

- ATL – O.J. Santiago 22-yard pass from Chris Chandler (Morten Andersen kick). Falcons 38–10
- ATL – Morten Andersen 32-yard field goal, 1:53. Falcons 41–10

**Top passers**

- ATL – Chris Chandler – 15/22, 240 yards, 2 TD, 2 INT
- NWE – Drew Bledsoe – 19/34, 229 yards, TD, INT

**Top rushers**

- ATL – Jamal Anderson – 32 rushes, 104 yards, 2 TD
- NWE – Robert Edwards – 10 rushes, 11 yards

**Top receivers**

- ATL – Terance Mathis, 8 receptions, 117 yards
- NWE – Tony Simmons, 4 receptions, 95 yards

Atlanta rolled up 41 points while the defense limited New England to just ten points at Foxboro Stadium in a game where New England never got closer than a 14–3 score after one quarter and trailed 28–3 at the half. Jamal Anderson ran in two scores, Chris Chandler threw two more, and Chuck Smith grabbed a fumble at his 29 and ran it back for a touchdown. Chandler completed 15 of 22 throws for 240 yards and Anderson rushed for 104 yards. About the only thing that went wrong for the Falcons were two meaningless picks by the Patriots' Ty Law. As of 2025, this remains the Falcons' most recent win against New England.

==== November 15 vs. San Francisco 49ers ====
Week 11: San Francisco 49ers at Atlanta Falcons

Quarter	1	2	3	4	Total
49ers	0	3	3	13	**19**
**Falcons**	0	7	3	21	**31**

at Georgia Dome, Atlanta, Georgia

- Date: November 15, 1998
- Game time: 1:00 p.m. EST
- Game weather: None (played indoors)
- Game attendance: 69,828

Game information

**First quarter**

- No scoring plays

**Second quarter**

- ATL – Jamal Anderson 10-yard rush (Morten Andersen kick). Falcons 7–0
- SF – Wade Richey 24-yard field goal, 0:23. Falcons 7–3

**Third quarter**

- SF – Wade Richey 28-yard field goal. Falcons 7–6
- ATL – Morten Andersen 37-yard field goal. Falcons 10–6

**Fourth quarter**

- ATL – Jamal Anderson 2-yard rush (Morten Andersen kick). Falcons 17–6
- ATL – Jessie Tuggle 1-yard defensive fumble return (Morten Andersen kick). Falcons 24–6
- SF – Terrell Owens 54-yard pass from Steve Young (run failed). Falcons 24–12
- SF – Jerry Rice 65-yard pass from Steve Young (Wade Richey kick). Falcons 24–19
- ATL – Terance Mathis 78-yard pass from Chris Chandler (Morten Andersen kick). Falcons 31–19

**Top passers**

- SF – Steve Young – 21/40, 342 yards, 2 TD, INT
- ATL – Chris Chandler – 12/21, 198 yards, TD

**Top rushers**

- SF – Garrison Hearst – 16 rushes, 56 yards
- ATL – Jamal Anderson – 31 rushes 100 yards, 2 TD

**Top receivers**

- SF – Jerry Rice – 10 receptions, 169 yards, TD
- ATL – Terance Mathis, 1 reception, 78 yards, TD

The Falcons avenged one of the only two losses they would suffer in the regular season by besting the Niners 31–19 in the Georgia Dome. Steve Young threw for 342 yards and touchdowns to Terrell Owens and Jerry Rice, but Jamal Anderson’s 100-rushing yards and two scores helped the Falcons put away the Niners in a wild fourth quarter in which the two teams combined for 34 points (21 by the Falcons).

==== December 6 vs. Indianapolis Colts ====
Week 14: Atlanta Falcons at Indianapolis Colts

Quarter	1	2	3	4	Total
Colts	14	7	0	0	**21**
**Falcons**	7	14	7	0	**28**

at Georgia Dome, Atlanta, Georgia

- Date: December 13, 1998
- Game time: 1:00 p.m. (EST)
- Game weather: None (played indoors)
- Game attendance: 61,141

Game information

**First quarter**

- IND – Marshall Faulk 11-yard pass from Peyton Manning (Mike Vanderjagt kick). Colts 7–0
- IND – Torrance Small 30-yard pass from Peyton Manning (Mike Vanderjagt kick). Colts 14–0
- ATL – Tony Martin 40-yard pass from Chris Chandler (Morten Andersen kick). Colts 14–7

**Second quarter**

- IND – Marshall Faulk 3-yard rush (Mike Vanderjagt kick). Colts 21–7
- ATL – Jamal Anderson 1-yard rush, 1:25 (Morten Andersen kick). Colts 21–14
- ATL – Chris Chandler 3-yard rush, 0:05 (Morten Andersen kick). 21–21

Third quarter'

- ATL – Terance Mathis 3-yard pass from Chris Chandler (Morten Andersen kick). Falcons 28–21

**Fourth quarter**

- No scoring plays

**Top passers**

- IND – Peyton Manning – 19/27, 159 yards, 2 TD, 2 INT
- ATL – Chris Chandler – 20/28, 297 yards, 2 TD, INT

**Top rushers**

- IND – Marshall Faulk – 19 rushes, 76 yards, TD
- ATL – Jamal Anderson – 30 rushes, 122 yards, TD

**Top receivers**

- IND – Ken Dilger – 5 receptions, 45 yards
- ATL – Tony Martin – 7 receptions, 140 yards, TD

The Falcons record their first-ever win against the Colts, ending a 10-game losing streak to them.

== Postseason ==
Round	Date	Opponent (seed)	Result	Record	Venue	Recap
Divisional	January 9, 1999	San Francisco 49ers (4)	W 20–18	1–0	Georgia Dome	Recap
NFC Championship	January 17, 1999	at Minnesota Vikings (1)	W 30–27 (OT)	2–0	Hubert H. Humphrey Metrodome	Recap
Super Bowl	January 31, 1999	Denver Broncos (A1)	L 19–34	2–1	Pro Player Stadium	Recap

=== NFC Divisional Playoff: vs. San Francisco 49ers ===
NFC Divisional Round: San Francisco 49ers at Atlanta Falcons – Game summary

Quarter	1	2	3	4	Total
49ers	0	10	0	8	18
Falcons	7	7	3	3	20

at Georgia Dome, Atlanta, Georgia

- Date: January 9, 1999
- Game time: 12:30 p.m. EST
- Game weather: None (played indoors)
- Game attendance: 70,262
- Referee: Jerry Markbreit
- TV announcers (Fox): Dick Stockton, Matt Millen, and Pam Oliver
- Box score

Game information

First quarter

- ATL – Jamal Anderson 2-yard run (Morten Anderson kick), 7:35. Falcons 7–0. Drive: 6 plays, 38 yards, 3:07.

Second quarter

- ATL – Jamal Anderson 34-yard run (Morten Anderson kick), 4:30. Falcons 14–0. Drive: 7 plays, 82 yards, 4:23.
- SF – Jerry Rice 17-yard pass from Steve Young (Wade Richey kick), 1:16. 'Falcons 14–7. Drive: 9 plays, 80 yards, 2:02.
- SF – Wade Richey 36-yard field goal, 0:01. Falcons 14–10. Drive: 5 plays, 18 yards, 0:38.

Third quarter

- ATL – Morten Anderson 29-yard field goal, 2:15. Falcons 17–10. Drive: 6 plays, 9 yards, 3:28.

Fourth quarter

- ATL – Morten Anderson 32-yard field goal, 11:30. Falcons 20–10. Drive: 7 plays, 21 yards, 3:50.
- SF – Steve Young 8-yard run (Greg Clark pass from Ty Detmer), 4:28. Falcons 20–18. Drive: 13 plays, 87 yards, 7:36.

Top passers

- SF – Steve Young – 23/37, 289 yards, TD, 3 INT
- ATL – Chris Chandler – 13/19, 169 yards, INT

Top rushers

- SF – Terry Kirby – 9 rushes, 22 yards
- ATL – Jamal Anderson – 29 rushes, 113 yards, 2 TD

Top receivers

- SF – J. J. Stokes – 5 receptions, 76 yards
- ATL – Terance Mathis – 5 receptions, 71 yards

The rubber match of Atlanta and San Francisco's 1998 season came in the Georgia Dome a week after the Niners' spectacular last-minute comeback over the Green Bay Packers. The Falcons, though, would not be denied as Jamal Anderson once again hauled the mail with 113 rushing yards and two touchdowns. Steve Young threw a touchdown to Jerry Rice and ran in a late fourth-quarter score; Ty Detmer threw the ensuing two-point conversion to Greg Clark to put the score at 20–18, but the Falcons never let the Niners any closer for their first playoff win since 1991. The Falcons moved on to face the #1 seed Minnesota Vikings in the NFC Championship Game.

=== NFC Championship: at Minnesota Vikings ===
NFC Championship Game: Atlanta Falcons at Minnesota Vikings – Game summary

Quarter	1	2	3	4	OT	Total
Falcons	7	7	3	10	3	30
Vikings	7	13	0	7	0	27

at Hubert H. Humphrey Metrodome, Minneapolis, Minnesota

- Date: January 17, 1999
- Game time: 12:30 p.m. EST/11:30 a.m. CST
- Game weather: None (played indoors)
- Game attendance: 64,060
- Referee: Walt Coleman
- TV announcers (Fox): Pat Summerall, John Madden, Ron Pitts, and Bill Maas
- Box score

Game information

First quarter

- ATL – Jamal Anderson 5-yard pass from Chris Chandler (Morten Anderson kick), 8:21. Falcons 7–0. Drive: 12 plays, 76 yards, 6:39.
- MIN – Randy Moss 31-yard pass from Randall Cunningham (Gary Anderson kick), 5:33. Tied 7–7. Drive: 4 plays, 80 yards, 2:48.

Second quarter

- MIN – Gary Anderson 29-yard field goal, 9:52. Vikings 10–7. Drive: 12 plays, 48 yards, 6:16.
- MIN – Randall Cunningham 1-yard run (Gary Anderson kick), 5:53. Vikings 17–7. Drive: 6 plays, 33 yards, 3:41.
- MIN – Gary Anderson 35-yard field goal, 2:45. Vikings 20–7. Drive: 6 plays, 39 yards, 1:28.
- ATL – Terance Mathis 14-yard pass from Chris Chandler (Morten Anderson kick), 0:56. Vikings 20–14. Drive: 1 play, 14 yards, 0:03.

Third quarter

- ATL – Morten Anderson 27-yard field goal, 5:36. Vikings 20–17. Drive: 10 plays, 62 yards, 6:03.

Fourth quarter

- MIN – Matthew Hatchette 6-yard pass from Randall Cunningham (Gary Anderson kick), 13:41. Vikings 27–17. Drive: 15 plays, 82 yards, 6:55.
- ATL – Morten Anderson 24-yard field goal, 11:02. Vikings 27–20. Drive: 7 plays, 73 yards, 2:39.
- ATL – Terance Mathis 16-yard pass from Chris Chandler (Morten Anderson kick), 0:49. Tied 27–27. Drive: 8 plays, 71 yards, 1:18.

Overtime

- ATL – Morten Anderson 38-yard field goal, 3:08. Falcons 30–27. Drive: 10 plays, 70 yards, 5:20.

Top passers

- ATL – Chris Chandler – 27/43, 340 yards, 3 TD
- MIN – Randall Cunningham – 29/48, 266 yards, 2 TD

Top rushers

- ATL – Jamal Anderson – 23 rushes, 67 yards
- MIN – Robert Smith – 21 rushes, 71 yards

Top receivers

- ATL – Tony Martin – 5 receptions, 129 yards
- MIN – Randy Moss – 6 receptions, 75 yards, TD

The 16–1 Vikings, boasting the league's highest-scoring post-merger offense, were heavy favorites at Hubert H. Humphrey Metrodome and raced to a 20–7 lead in the second quarter off two Randall Cunningham touchdowns (one rushing and a throw to Randy Moss), but at the end of the first half Chris Chandler found Terance Mathis for a 14-yard score following a Cunningham fumble (forced by Chuck Smith near the end of the half). After a Morten Andersen field goal made it 20–17 in the third, the Vikings surged to a 27–17 lead on another Cunningham TD throw (this one to Matthew Hatchette). In the frantic final ten minutes of regulation, the Falcons, trailing 27-20, appeared poised to tie the game after Shane Dronett recovered a botched snap deep in Vikings territory, but they turned the ball over on downs after foregoing a field goal on fourth-and-four, when a Chandler pass to Mathis fell incomplete. In the final four minutes, Gary Anderson, who hadn't missed a field goal all season, sent a 38-yarder narrowly wide left. With just over two minutes remaining, Chandler then drove the Falcons downfield and connected with Mathis in the endzone with 49 seconds remaining. Both teams punted on their first overtime possession (the Vikings, who had the ball first and had nearly won when Eugene Robinson dove to defend a deep pass to an otherwise uncovered Moss). On their second drive of the extra period, Chandler connected with OJ Santiago for two big gains before Andersen nailed a 38-yard field goal; the 30–27 final sent the Falcons to Super Bowl XXXIII.

=== Super Bowl XXXIII: vs. Denver Broncos ===
Super Bowl XXXIII: Denver Broncos vs. Atlanta Falcons

Quarter	1	2	3	4	Total
Broncos	7	10	0	17	34
Falcons	3	3	0	13	19

at Pro Player Stadium, Miami Gardens, Florida

- Date: January 31, 1999
- Game time: 6:25 p.m. EST
- Game weather: Clear, 73 °F (22.8 °C)
- Game attendance: 74,803
- Referee: Bernie Kukar
- TV announcers (Fox): Pat Summerall, John Madden, Ron Pitts, and Bill Maas
- "Super Bowl XXXIII – Denver Broncos vs. Atlanta Falcons " January 31st, 1999". Pro Football Reference. NFL Scores.

Game information

First quarter

- ATL – Morten Anderson 32-yard field goal, 9:35. Falcons 3–0. Drive: 10 plays, 48 yards, 5:25.
- DEN – Howard Griffith 1-yard run (Jason Elam kick), 3:55. Broncos 7–3. Drive: 10 plays, 80 yards, 5:40.

Second quarter

- DEN – Jason Elam 26-yard field goal, 9:17. Broncos 10–3. Drive: 11 plays, 63 yards, 4:58.
- DEN – Rod Smith 80-yard pass from John Elway (Jason Elam kick), 4:54. Broncos 17–3. Drive: 1 play, 80 yards, 0:13.
- ATL – Morten Anderson 28-yard field goal, 2:25. Broncos 17–6. Drive: 7 plays, 38 yards, 2:29.

Third quarter

- No scoring plays

Fourth quarter

- DEN – Howard Griffith 1-yard run (Jason Elam kick), 14:56. Broncos 24–6. Drive: 5 plays, 24 yards, 1:50.
- DEN – John Elway 3-yard run (Jason Elam kick), 11:20. Broncos 31–6. Drive: 3 plays, 48 yards, 1:17.
- ATL – Tim Dwight 94-yard kickoff return (Morten Anderson kick), 11:01. Broncos 31–13.
- DEN – Jason Elam 37-yard field goal, 7:08. Broncos 34–13. Drive: 7 plays, 36 yards, 3:53.
- ATL – Terance Mathis 3-yard pass from Chris Chandler (pass failed), 2:04. Broncos 34–19. Drive: 16 plays, 76 yards, 5:04.

Top passers

- DEN – John Elway – 18/29, 336 yards, TD, INT
- ATL – Chris Chandler – 19/35, 219 yards, TD, 3 INT

Top rushers

- DEN – Terrell Davis – 25 rushes, 102 yards
- ATL – Jamal Anderson – 18 rushes, 96 yards

Top receivers

- DEN – Rod Smith – 5 receptions, 152 yards, TD
- ATL – Terance Mathis – 7 receptions, 85 yards, TD

The Falcons were unable to continue their success to the next season and finished their 1999 campaign at 5–11. Atlanta would not return to the Super Bowl until Super Bowl LI at the conclusion of the 2016 NFL season.
