= Trey Teague =

American football player (born 1974)

No. 70
- Position: Center

Personal information
- Born: December 27, 1974 (age 51); Jackson, Tennessee, U.S.
- Listed height: 6 ft 5 in (1.96 m)
- Listed weight: 300 lb (136 kg)

Career information
- High school: University School of Jackson
- College: Tennessee
- NFL draft: 1998: 7th round, 200th overall pick

Career history
- Denver Broncos (1998–2001); Buffalo Bills (2002–2005); New York Jets (2006)

Awards and highlights
- Super Bowl champion (XXXIII); First-team All-SEC (1997)

Career NFL statistics
- Games played: 94
- Games started: 80
- Fumble recoveries: 6
- Stats at Pro Football Reference

Fred Everette “Trey” Teague III (born December 27, 1974) is an American former professional football player who was a center in the National Football League (NFL). He played college football for the Tennessee Volunteers and was selected by the Denver Broncos in the seventh round of the 1998 NFL draft.

== College career ==
Teague attended and played college football at the University of Tennessee.

== Professional career ==
=== Denver Broncos ===
Teague was drafted by the Denver Broncos in the seventh round (200th overall) of the 1998 NFL Draft. He played for the Broncos from 1998 to 2001. He was part of the team that won Super Bowl XXXIII over the Atlanta Falcons. In 2001, he became their starting left offensive tackle in all 16 games.

=== Buffalo Bills ===
Teague went to the Bills in 2002, becoming their starting center in place of Bill Conaty. There he stayed for three more years, up to 2005. In 2006, he was replaced by Melvin Fowler.

=== New York Jets ===
In the 2006 offseason, the Jets signed Teague. On February 21, 2007, Teague was released by the New York Jets, the last team with which he was signed.
