= Super Bowl XXXIII =

1999 National Football League championship game

| Denver Broncos (1) (AFC) (14–2) | Atlanta Falcons (2) (NFC) (14–2) |
|---|---|
| 34 | 19 |
| Head coach: Mike Shanahan | Head coach: Dan Reeves |
| | 1 | 2 | 3 | 4 | Total |
|---|---|---|---|---|---|
| DEN | 7 | 10 | 0 | 17 | 34 |
| ATL | 3 | 3 | 0 | 13 | 19 |
- Date: January 31, 1999
- Kickoff time: 6:22 p.m. EST (UTC-5)
- Stadium: Pro Player Stadium; Miami, Florida
- MVP: John Elway, quarterback
- Favorite: Broncos by 7.5
- Referee: Bernie Kukar
- Attendance: 74,803

Ceremonies
- National anthem: Cher
- Coin toss: Raymond Berry, Lenny Moore, Jim Parker, Art Donovan, Gino Marchetti, Frank Gifford, Roosevelt Brown, Don Maynard, Sam Huff, and Tom Landry
- Halftime show: Gloria Estefan, Stevie Wonder, and Big Bad Voodoo Daddy

TV in the United States
- Network: Fox
- Announcers: Pat Summerall, John Madden, Ron Pitts, and Bill Maas
- Nielsen ratings: 40.2 (est. 83.7 million viewers)
- Market share: 61
- Cost of 30-second commercial: $1.6 million

Radio in the United States
- Network: Westwood One
- Announcers: Howard David, Matt Millen, and John Dockery

Super Bowl XXXIII was an American football game played between the American Football Conference (AFC) champion and defending Super Bowl XXXII champion Denver Broncos and the National Football Conference (NFC) champion Atlanta Falcons to decide the National Football League (NFL) champion for the 1998 season. The Broncos defeated the Falcons by the score of 34–19, winning their second consecutive Super Bowl. The game was played on January 31, 1999, at Pro Player Stadium in Miami, Florida (now part of the suburb of Miami Gardens, which became a separate city in 2003).

The defending Super Bowl champion Broncos entered the game with an AFC-best 14–2 regular season record. The Falcons, under former Broncos head coach Dan Reeves, were making their first Super Bowl appearance after also posting a 14–2 regular season record.

Aided by quarterback John Elway's 80-yard touchdown pass to receiver Rod Smith, the Broncos scored 17 consecutive points to build a 17–3 lead in the second quarter from which the Falcons could not recover. In the final game of his career before he announced his retirement on May 2, 1999, Elway completed 18 of 29 passes for 336 yards with one touchdown and one interception, and also scored a 3-yard rushing touchdown. At 38 years old, Elway became the oldest player to be named Super Bowl MVP, a record that stood until Tom Brady surpassed it in 2017 at the age of 39, coincidentally also against the Falcons.

== Background ==
=== Host selection process ===
NFL owners originally voted to award Super Bowl XXXIII to Candlestick Park in San Francisco during the owners meeting in Rosemont, Illinois on November 2, 1994. Two cities were in consideration for the game, San Francisco and Miami (Joe Robbie Stadium). Though Miami's bid was considered superior, San Francisco was the favorite since the Bay Area had not hosted the game since 1985. The host committee was also promising $26 million in stadium renovations. Before long, however, it became unclear if the proposed stadium renovations would happen. The game was formally withdrawn from San Francisco in March 1996. Al Davis made a pitch to keep the game in the Bay Area by moving it over to Oakland Coliseum, but the idea failed to gain any support.

In the fall of 1996, the NFL reopened the bidding from scratch. The NFL owners scheduled a vote during the October 31, 1996, meeting in New Orleans, which was to award two Super Bowls, XXXIII and XXXIV. A total of five cities submitted bids: Miami (Joe Robbie Stadium), Atlanta (Georgia Dome), Tampa (Raymond James Stadium), Phoenix/Tempe (Sun Devil Stadium), and Los Angeles (Coliseum). Miami, a previous finalist for the game, was an early favorite. Tampa also became a favorite after voters passed a ballot measure in September 1996 to fund the construction of a new stadium. NFL commissioner Paul Tagliabue threw his support behind Tampa based on the new stadium plans. The Los Angeles host committee originally was going to partner with Pasadena (Rose Bowl), but switched their plans to the Coliseum after a renovation plan was announced. However, the Los Angeles bid was dismissed when their delegation failed to convince the owners that planned stadium renovations would be completed in time.

Owners initially planned on selecting only two hosts (XXXIII and XXXIV), but decided to name three after strong showings by the respective delegations. Miami, Atlanta, and Tampa were selected to host XXXIII, XXXIV, and XXXV, respectively. This was the eighth time that the South Florida area hosted the game, and the third at Joe Robbie Stadium.

=== Denver Broncos ===
Following the Broncos' victory during Super Bowl XXXII the previous season, many wondered if 15-year veteran quarterback John Elway would retire after finally winning a Super Bowl. But Elway decided to stay with the Broncos and see if he could lead them to a second consecutive championship. Under the leadership of head coach Mike Shanahan, the Broncos stormed to the top of the AFC with a 14–2 regular record in 1998, winning their first 13 games before suffering their first loss to the New York Giants and would lose again the very next week against the Miami Dolphins on Monday night, only to win a meaningless season finale against the Seattle Seahawks. The losses to the Giants and Dolphins didn't hurt the Broncos' playoff chances as they already had their division (and home-field advantage) locked up.

The Broncos' offense, under the leadership of Elway and running back Terrell Davis, had another outstanding regular season, ranking second in the NFL with 501 points and third in total offense with 6,276 yards. Davis had one of the greatest seasons of any running back in NFL history, rushing for 2,008 yards, catching 25 passes for 217 yards, and scoring 23 touchdowns to earn him both the NFL Most Valuable Player Award and the NFL Offensive Player of the Year Award. Nevertheless, Davis' rushing numbers did not reduce Elway's passing production. The 38-year-old quarterback made the Pro Bowl for the 3rd year in a row and the 9th time in his career, throwing for 2,806 yards and 22 touchdowns, with only 10 interceptions. A big reason for Elway's passing success was that he had two Pro Bowl wide receivers and a Pro Bowl tight end to throw to. Wide receivers Ed McCaffrey (64 receptions, 1,053 yards and 10 touchdowns) and Rod Smith (86 receptions, 1,222 yards, 6 touchdowns, and 66 rushing yards) provided the team with outstanding deep threats, while tight end Shannon Sharpe (64 receptions, 786 yards and 10 touchdowns) provided a sure-handed target over the middle. In week 3 against the Oakland Raiders, Elway pulled his hamstring, forcing the Broncos to go with veteran journeyman Bubby Brister. Despite losing Elway to injury the Broncos didn't lose a beat, as Brister won all four games that he started and posted a higher quarterback rating than Elway for the season. The Broncos also had three Pro Bowlers anchoring their offensive line: center Tom Nalen, guard Mark Schlereth, and tackle Tony Jones. On special teams, running back Vaughn Hebron returned 46 kickoffs for 1,216 yards and a touchdown, giving him a 26.4 yards per return average.

The Broncos' defense typically did not get as much attention as their offense, but it was still effective, giving up 308 points (8th fewest in the NFL). Up front, the line was anchored by defensive tackles Maa Tanuvasa and Trevor Pryce, who each recorded 8.5 sacks. Behind them, Pro Bowl linebacker Bill Romanowski recorded 55 tackles, 7.5 sacks, 3 fumble recoveries, and 2 interceptions. The secondary was led by Pro Bowler Steve Atwater and Darrien Gordon, who led the team with 4 interceptions, which he returned for 125 yards and a touchdown. Gordon was also a great punt returner, returning 34 punts for 379 yards.

=== Atlanta Falcons ===
The Falcons advanced to their first Super Bowl in franchise history. Like the Broncos, they finished the 1998 regular season with a 14–2 record, including wins in each of their last nine games. Unlike the Broncos, the Falcons' success in 1998 was very surprising to many because they had a 7–9 record in the previous season and a 3–13 record the year before that. In fact, the franchise recorded just four non-losing seasons in the nineteen years prior to 1998, and just two in its previous fifteen.

The Falcons' fortunes began to improve after Dan Reeves became their head coach in 1997. During Reeves' first season with Atlanta, they finished the season 6–2, after starting out 1–7, to compile a 7–9 record overall. Reeves was the Broncos' head coach from 1981 to 1992, leading the Elway-led Broncos to Super Bowls XXI, XXII, and XXIV. However Elway and the Broncos lost all three, including a 55–10 loss to the San Francisco 49ers in Super Bowl XXIV. Reeves was in constant conflict with his coaching staff and some of his players for the three ensuing seasons. The Broncos fired Reeves after the 1992 season and Reeves spent four seasons as the head coach of the New York Giants before joining the Falcons.

Pro Bowl quarterback Chris Chandler led the Falcons' offense extremely well, throwing for 3,154 yards and 25 touchdowns with just 12 interceptions, while also rushing for 121 yards and 2 touchdowns. Backup quarterback Steve DeBerg (who was Reeves' quarterbacks coach with the Giants in 1995 and 1996) had come out of retirement as a player after 5 years and played in place of an injured Chandler in the October 25 game against the New York Jets. Wide receivers Tony Martin and Terance Mathis provided the team with a superb deep threat, each recording over 60 receptions and 1,100 receiving yards, while also combining for 17 touchdowns. Tight end O.J. Santiago added 27 receptions for 428 yards and 5 scores. However, the biggest threat on offense was Pro Bowl running back Jamal Anderson, who rushed for 1,846 yards, caught 27 passes for 319 yards, and scored 16 total touchdowns. Rookie wide receiver Tim Dwight gave the team a great special teams attack, gaining a total of 1,236 yards and scoring a touchdown on kickoff and punt returns.

The Falcons' defense ranked second in the league for fewest rushing yards allowed (1,203), eighth for fewest total yards allowed (5,009), and fourth for fewest points allowed. Defensive linemen Lester Archambeau (10 sacks, 2 fumble recoveries, 5 forced fumbles), Chuck Smith (8.5 sacks, 4 fumble recoveries, 3 forced fumbles) and Shane Dronett (6.5 sacks, 4 force fumbles) excelled at pressuring quarterbacks and stopping the run. Behind them, the Falcons had two outstanding linebackers, Pro Bowler Jessie Tuggle (65 tackles, 3 sacks, 1 fumble recovery) and Cornelius Bennett (69 tackles, 1 sack, 2 fumble recoveries). Bennett played with the Buffalo Bills when they suffered their four consecutive defeats in Super Bowls XXV, XXVI, XXVII, and XXVIII; and thus was determined to finally get a championship ring that had eluded him in the past. The Falcons' secondary was led by Pro Bowl cornerback Ray Buchanan, who recorded seven interceptions and 102 return yards, and Pro Bowl safety Eugene Robinson (four interceptions), who was with the Green Bay Packers when they appeared in Super Bowls XXXI and XXXII.

The season was punctuated by Reeves receiving emergency coronary bypass surgery after Week 14. Doctors said he could have been "within hours of a catastrophic heart attack." Although asked to rest for at least six weeks, Reeves returned to the sidelines for Week 17. Then-defensive coordinator Rich Brooks substituted for Reeves as head coach in Weeks 15 and 16, and won both games.

The Falcons did not return to the Super Bowl until 2016, when they lost 34–28 in overtime to the New England Patriots in Super Bowl LI.

=== Playoffs ===
The Broncos avenged their Monday night loss to the Miami Dolphins, a team which had the number one defense in the league that year, 38–3 in the divisional round and then beat the New York Jets, who had the second best defense in the NFL that year, 23–10 in the AFC Championship game. After the Jets scored on a John Hall field goal to take a 3-0 lead at halftime, and increasing it on a Curtis Martin touchdown run to make it 10-0 early in the 3rd quarter, the Broncos took control of the rest of the game scoring 23 unanswered points. Meanwhile, the Falcons were victorious against the San Francisco 49ers, 20–18 and then upset the heavily favored 15–1 Minnesota Vikings on the road, 30–27 in overtime.

This was the third Super Bowl in history that featured two teams with fewer than three losses, and second since the advent of the 16-game schedule. Both teams came into the game with 16–2 records after the playoffs. The first was Super Bowl XII, featuring two 12–2 teams: the Dallas Cowboys and the Denver Broncos. The only Super Bowl featuring a better matchup record-wise was Super Bowl XIX, when the San Francisco 49ers had a 17–1 record and the Miami Dolphins had a 16–2 record.

=== Super Bowl pregame news ===
Much of the pregame hype was centered around John Elway confronting his former coach Reeves. Broncos head coach Mike Shanahan was hurt and angered by Reeves' pregame assertion that Shanahan and Elway had conspired to have him fired during his stint with the Broncos. Media coverage also focused on whether or not Elway would retire after the season (which he eventually did).

Elway became the first quarterback to start five Super Bowls; he previously started Super Bowls XXI, XXII, XXIV, and XXXII. Broncos defensive lineman Mike Lodish was making his record sixth appearance in a Super Bowl. He played with the Buffalo Bills in all four of their Super Bowl losses (Super Bowl XXV through XXVIII) and with the Broncos' first Super Bowl win the year before.

On the night before the Super Bowl, Falcons safety Eugene Robinson was arrested for solicitation of prostitution. While driving alone in a rented car along a downtown Miami street, he approached a female undercover police officer posing as a prostitute and offered $40 for oral sex. Although he was released from jail and allowed to play the game, he was widely denounced by the press and fans for the incident. Ironically, on the morning of the day Robinson was arrested for the incident, he had received the Bart Starr Award for his "high moral character."

As the designated home team in the annual rotation between AFC and NFC teams, the Falcons chose to wear their regular black home uniforms with silver pants, with the Broncos going for the road white uniforms and pants.

== Broadcasting ==
The game was broadcast in the United States by Fox and featured the broadcast team of play-by-play announcer Pat Summerall and color commentator John Madden. James Brown hosted all the events with help from his then-fellow Fox NFL Sunday cast members Terry Bradshaw, Howie Long and Cris Collinsworth. The starting lineups were shown using a virtual television. To television viewers, it appeared as if the end zone opened up and a giant television came up out of the ground. The virtual television displayed video announcing the starting lineups. The virtual television effect was provided by PVI Virtual Media Services using their L-VIS virtual graphics system.

For Super Bowl lead-out programs, Fox first aired the pilot episode of Family Guy, "Death Has a Shadow". Family Guy would become, at the time, only the fourth series to premiere after the Super Bowl and then have a very successful, lengthy run afterwards. The three other successful series that premiered after the Super Bowl were The A-Team after Super Bowl XVII, The Wonder Years after Super Bowl XXII, and Homicide: Life on the Street after Super Bowl XXVII. This was followed by The Simpsons episode "Sunday, Cruddy Sunday". Actress Calista Flockhart (then the star of Fox's Ally McBeal) and boxer Evander Holyfield (the then-heavyweight champion), both die hard Falcons fans, were in attendance for the game.

=== Counterprogramming ===
During halftime, USA Network aired a special edition of WWF Sunday Night Heat called Halftime Heat featuring a match between The Rock and Mankind for the WWF Championship in an Empty Arena Match that took place in Arizona and had been taped five days before. Mankind won the title, just seven days after losing it to The Rock at the Royal Rumble.

FoxSports.com also ran an online-only Internet halftime show, Webcast live from South Beach Miami, and hosted by then-Fox Sports Net anchorman Keith Olbermann. This halftime show was sponsored by Victoria's Secret and available exclusively in Windows Media Player. Viewer questions were solicited via the FoxSports.com website.

== Entertainment ==
=== Pregame ceremonies ===
The pregame show, narrated by actress Tori Spelling, depicted the adventure of a Caribbean cruise from its festive departure to its journey to exotic destinations. The show included a performance by Kiss, along with their trademark elaborate costumes and theatrical pyrotechnics.

Cher later sang the U.S. national anthem.

To honor the 40th anniversary of the 1958 NFL Championship, also known as "The Greatest Game Ever Played", the following participants of that game appeared during the coin toss ceremony: Raymond Berry, Lenny Moore, Jim Parker, Art Donovan, Gino Marchetti, Frank Gifford, Roosevelt Brown, Don Maynard, Sam Huff, and Tom Landry, the defensive coordinator of the New York Giants. Weeb Ewbank, head coach of the Baltimore Colts in that game, was also scheduled to appear, but died November 17, 1998.

=== Halftime show ===
The halftime show was titled "A Celebration of Soul, Salsa and Swing" and featured Big Bad Voodoo Daddy, Stevie Wonder, and Gloria Estefan.

== Game summary ==
=== First quarter ===
Falcons wide receiver Tim Dwight returned the opening kickoff 31 yards to the Falcons' 37-yard line. Aided by a 25-yard pass interference penalty against Broncos safety Steve Atwater (which was actually meant to be called against cornerback Ray Crockett) and four runs by running back Jamal Anderson for 24 total yards, the Falcons reached the Broncos' 8-yard line. However, linebacker Bill Romanowski sacked quarterback Chris Chandler for a 7-yard loss on third down, forcing the Falcons to settle for kicker Morten Andersen's 32-yard field goal to give them an early 3–0 lead.

The Broncos then responded with a 10-play, 80-yard scoring drive. Quarterback John Elway's 41-yard completion to wide receiver Rod Smith and two receptions by tight end Shannon Sharpe for a total of 26 yards set up fullback Howard Griffith's 1-yard touchdown run, giving the Broncos a 7–3 lead. However, Sharpe injured his knee just before Griffith's touchdown after making his second catch before being upended by cornerback Ray Buchanan. Sharpe did play on the Broncos' next drive, but was taken out of the game after that. After the Broncos forced the Falcons to punt on their next possession, Elway threw a pass that was deflected by Sharpe and intercepted by defensive back Ronnie Bradford, who returned it to the Broncos' 35-yard line.

=== Second quarter ===
However, the Falcons failed to capitalize on the turnover, as the Broncos' defense stood their ground on the first two plays of the second quarter. First, they tackled Anderson for no gain on 3rd-and-1, then stopped him for a 2-yard loss on fourth down, turning the ball over on downs. Broncos running back Terrell Davis then rushed four times for 28 yards and wide receiver Rod Smith caught an 18-yard pass as the Broncos drove 63 yards in 11 plays to score on kicker Jason Elam's 26-yard field goal, increasing their lead to 10–3.

The Falcons then advanced to the Broncos' 8-yard line on their next drive, aided by back-to-back completions from Chandler to wide receiver Terance Mathis for 46 yards, but failed to score again when Andersen's 26-yard field goal attempt sailed wide right. Immediately after the Broncos got the ball back, Smith broke ahead of Falcons safety Eugene Robinson, caught a pass from Elway, and took off for an 80-yard touchdown reception, giving the Broncos a 17–3 lead (the fourth 80+ yard touchdown pass play in Super Bowl history). At the time of the game, the television audience did not see most of that play, as Fox was still airing a commercial for The Matrix. Aided by Dwight's 42-yard kickoff return and a 23-yard reception by wide receiver Tony Martin, the Falcons responded by driving to the Broncos' 11-yard line and scoring on Andersen's 28-yard field goal to cut their deficit to 17–6 going into halftime.

=== Third quarter ===
The Broncos opened the second half by driving 74 yards to the Falcons' 20-yard line, aided by Elway's two completions to wide receiver Ed McCaffrey for 32 yards, but ended up scoring no points after Elam's 38-yard field goal attempt sailed wide right. Chandler responded on the next two plays with a 19-yard completion to Martin and a 12-yard scramble to advance the ball to the Broncos' 41-yard line. However, the Broncos' defense continued to dominate the Falcons' offense, as linebacker John Mobley sacked Chandler for a 6-yard loss, then cornerback Darrius Johnson intercepted a pass intended for Mathis and returned it 28 yards to the Falcons' 42-yard line. The Broncos then drove to the 29-yard line, but Elam missed another field goal attempt wide left, this time from 48 yards.

The Falcons then drove to the Broncos' 21-yard line on Anderson's two runs for 28 yards and Mathis' 13-yard reception, giving them a chance to cut their deficit to one score. On the next play, however, Chandler threw a pass that was deflected high in the air by nose tackle Keith Traylor and intercepted by cornerback Darrien Gordon, who returned it 58 yards to the Falcons' 24-yard line before being tackled by Chandler. Three plays later, on 3rd-and-6, Elway's 15-yard completion to McCaffrey set up 1st-and-goal for the Broncos at the Falcons' 5-yard line.

=== Fourth quarter ===
On the first play of the final quarter, Griffith scored his second touchdown of the game on a 1-yard run to increase Denver's lead to 24–6.

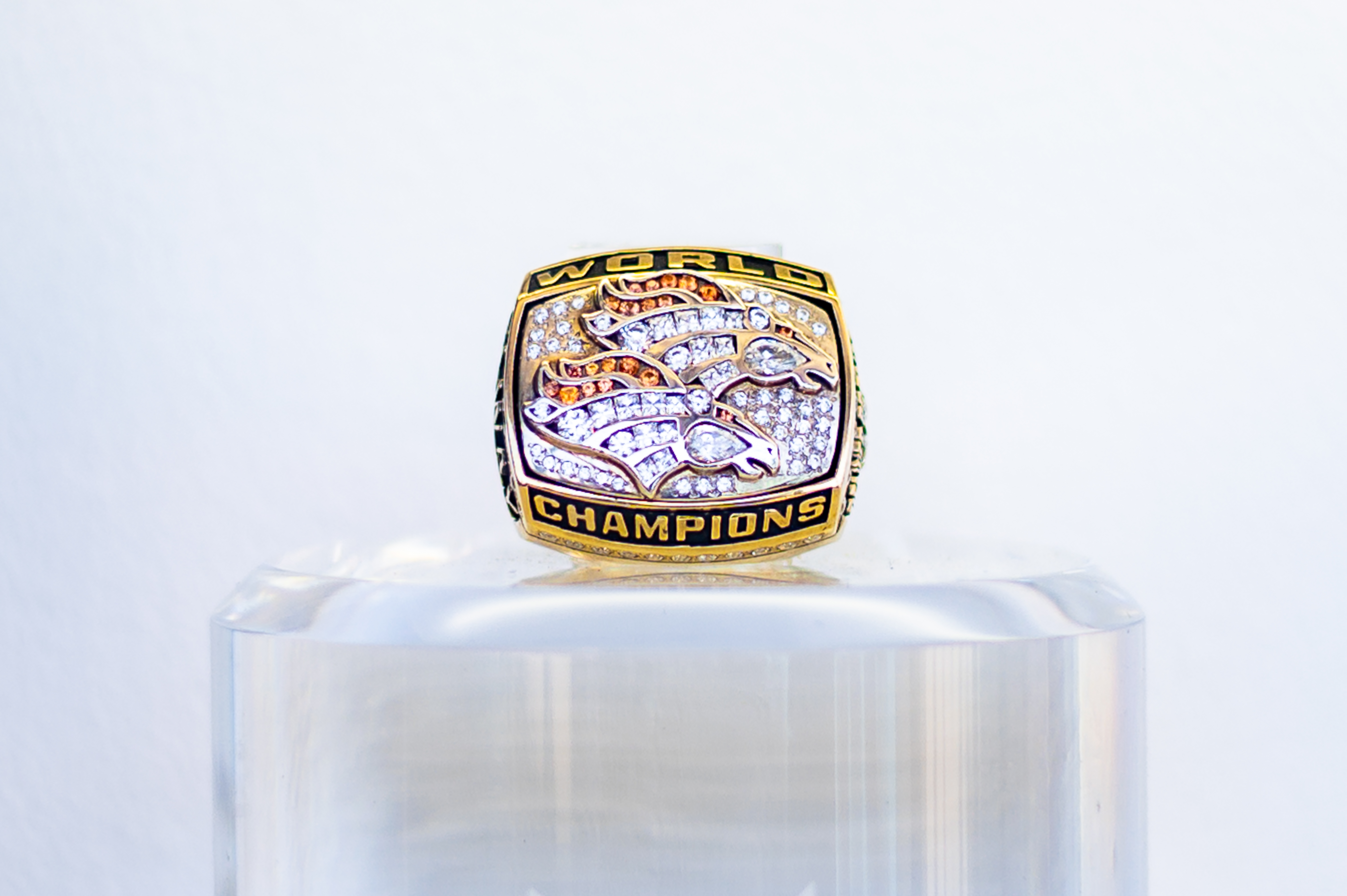
A Super Bowl XXXIII ring. The two horse's heads symbolize that this was the Broncos' second title.

The Falcons reached the Broncos' 26-yard line on their ensuing drive, aided by a 15-yard run by Anderson, and Chandler's two passes to tight end O. J. Santiago and Martin for 13 and 16 yards, respectively, but Gordon intercepted another pass at his own 2-yard line and returned this one 50 yards to the Falcons' 48-yard line. On the next play, Elway completed a short pass to Davis, who turned it into a 39-yard gain. Two plays later, Elway finished the drive himself with a 3-yard touchdown run, giving the Broncos a 31–6 lead and essentially putting the game away. Elway, who previously ran for touchdowns in Super Bowls XXI, XXIV, and XXXII, became the second player after Buffalo Bills running back Thurman Thomas to score a touchdown in four different Super Bowls.

The Falcons finally scored their first touchdown of the game when Dwight returned the ensuing kickoff 94 yards, cutting their deficit to 31–13, but tight end Byron Chamberlain recovered the ensuing onside kick attempt for the Broncos. Three plays later, a 25-yard completion from Elway to McCaffrey set up Elam's 37-yard field goal, increasing the Broncos' lead to 34–13 with just over 7 minutes left in the game.

The Falcons finally put together their best scoring drive of the game, advancing the ball 76 yards in 16 plays. The drive featured a 17-yard reception by Martin, two receptions by wide receiver Ronnie Harris for 21 yards, and four receptions by Mathis for 30 yards, the last of which was for a 3-yard touchdown, cutting the Falcons' deficit to 34–19 (Chandler's pass to Martin on the two-point conversion attempt was incomplete), but by then there was only 2:04 left in the game. Chamberlain again recovered the ensuing onside kick, but the Falcons got the ball back on their own 30-yard line with 1:34 left after forcing a turnover on downs. However, safety George Coghill stripped the ball from Anderson at the Falcons' 33-yard line, and safety Tyrone Braxton recovered it, allowing the Broncos to run out the clock and win their second consecutive Super Bowl title. The Broncos' 17 and the Falcons' 13 combined for a Super Bowl record 30 aggregate fourth-quarter points.

The Falcons' offense gained a total of 337 yards, were not penalized once, and drove inside the Broncos' 30-yard line seven times. Nevertheless, the Falcons' offense scored only 13 points and committed four turnovers. Meanwhile, the Broncos gained a total of 457 yards and scored 34 points.

For the Broncos, Davis rushed for 102 yards and caught 2 passes for 50 yards. Davis's 102 rushing yards in the Super Bowl gave him over 100 rushing yards for the seventh consecutive postseason game (and he was the third player to run for 100 yards in back-to-back Super Bowls, the others being Larry Csonka in Super Bowls VII and VIII, and Emmitt Smith in Super Bowls XXVII and XXVIII). Davis became just the second player to be on a Super Bowl-winning team after being named the NFL Most Valuable Player and leading the league in rushing. Emmitt Smith was the first one, but also was named Super Bowl MVP for Super Bowl XXVIII during that year. Marcus Allen is the only other player to win all three of these honors during his career. Allen won the 1985 NFL MVP Award and rushing title while being named Super Bowl XVIII MVP at the conclusion of the 1983 season. Smith caught 5 passes for 152 yards and a touchdown, an average of 30.4 yards per catch. Gordon recorded 2 interceptions and returned them for a Super Bowl record 108 yards.

For the Falcons, Jamal Anderson rushed for 96 yards and caught 3 passes for 16 yards. Dwight returned 5 kickoffs for 210 yards, the second most in Super Bowl history, and the highest Super Bowl career yards per return average (42.0). Mathis led the Falcons with 7 receptions for 85 yards. Chandler finished the game with 19 out of 35 completions for 219 yards and a touchdown but was intercepted 3 times.

Dan Reeves became the fourth head coach to lose four Super Bowls, joining Bud Grant, Don Shula, and Marv Levy. Reeves lost Super Bowls XXI, XXII, and XXIV while coaching the Broncos.

As previously mentioned, this was John Elway's final game as a player, and this was also the final game in a Broncos uniform for safety Steve Atwater who was traded in the offseason to the Jets.

This was the first time that an AFC team won a Super Bowl in Miami in 20 years. The last time was when the Pittsburgh Steelers won Super Bowl XIII in 1979. The win also made the Broncos the first AFC team to win back-to-back titles since the Steelers did in both the 1978 and 1979 seasons.

=== Box score ===
Super Bowl XXXIII: Denver Broncos 34, Atlanta Falcons 19

| Quarter | 1 | 2 | 3 | 4 | Total |
|---|---|---|---|---|---|
| Broncos (AFC) | 7 | 10 | 0 | 17 | 34 |
| Falcons (NFC) | 3 | 3 | 0 | 13 | 19 |

at Pro Player Stadium, Miami, Florida

- Date: January 31, 1999
- Game time: 6:25 p.m. EST
- Game weather: 73 °F or 22.8 °C, clear

Scoring summary

| Quarter | Time | Drive | | | Team | Scoring information | Score | |
| Quarter | Time | Plays | Yards | TOP | Team | Scoring information | DEN | ATL |
|---|---|---|---|---|---|---|---|---|
| 1 | 9:35 | 10 | 48 | 5:25 | ATL | 32-yard field goal by Morten Andersen | 0 | 3 |
| 1 | 3:55 | 10 | 80 | 5:40 | DEN | Howard Griffith 1-yard touchdown run, Jason Elam kick good | 7 | 3 |
| 2 | 9:17 | 11 | 63 | 4:58 | DEN | 26-yard field goal by Elam | 10 | 3 |
| 2 | 4:54 | 1 | 80 | 0:13 | DEN | Rod Smith 80-yard touchdown reception from John Elway, Elam kick good | 17 | 3 |
| 2 | 2:25 | 7 | 38 | 2:29 | ATL | 28-yard field goal by Andersen | 17 | 6 |
| 4 | 14:56 | 5 | 24 | 1:50 | DEN | Griffith 1-yard touchdown run, Elam kick good | 24 | 6 |
| 4 | 11:20 | 3 | 48 | 1:17 | DEN | Elway 3-yard touchdown run, Elam kick good | 31 | 6 |
| 4 | 11:01 | — | — | — | ATL | Tim Dwight 94-yard kickoff return for a touchdown, Andersen kick good | 31 | 13 |
| 4 | 7:08 | 7 | 36 | 3:53 | DEN | 37-yard field goal by Elam | 34 | 13 |
| 4 | 2:04 | 16 | 76 | 5:04 | ATL | Terance Mathis 3-yard touchdown reception from Chris Chandler, 2-point pass no good | 34 | 19 |
| "TOP" = time of possession. For other American football terms, see Glossary of American football. | | | | | | | 34 | 19 |

== Final statistics ==
Sources: NFL.com Super Bowl XXXIII, Super Bowl XXXIII Play Finder Den, Super Bowl XXXIII Play Finder Atl, USA Today Super Bowl XXXIII Play by Play

=== Statistical comparison ===
| Statistic | Denver Broncos | Atlanta Falcons |
|---|---|---|
| First downs | 22 | 21 |
| First downs rushing | 8 | 8 |
| First downs passing | 14 | 12 |
| First downs penalty | 0 | 1 |
| Third down efficiency | 6/13 | 5/11 |
| Fourth down efficiency | 0/1 | 1/2 |
| Net yards rushing | 121 | 131 |
| Rushing attempts | 36 | 23 |
| Yards per rush | 3.4 | 5.7 |
| Passing – Completions/attempts | 18/29 | 19/35 |
| Times sacked-total yards | 0–0 | 2–13 |
| Interceptions thrown | 1 | 3 |
| Net yards passing | 336 | 206 |
| Total net yards | 457 | 337 |
| Punt returns-total yards | 0–0 | 0–0 |
| Kickoff returns-total yards | 3–44 | 7–227 |
| Interceptions-total return yards | 3–136 | 1–1 |
| Punts-average yardage | 1–35.0 | 1–39.0 |
| Fumbles-lost | 0–0 | 1–1 |
| Penalties-total yards | 4–61 | 0–0 |
| Time of possession | 31:23 | 28:37 |
| Turnovers | 1 | 4 |

=== Individual statistics ===
Broncos passing
| | C/ATT (Note: Completions/attempts) | Yds | TD | INT | Rating |
|---|---|---|---|---|---|
| John Elway | 18/29 | 336 | 1 | 1 | 99.2 |
Broncos rushing
| | Car (Note: Carries) | Yds | TD | LG (Note: Longest gain) | Yds/Car |
| Terrell Davis | 25 | 102 | 0 | 15 | 4.08 |
| Howard Griffith | 4 | 9 | 2 | 4 | 2.25 |
| Derek Loville | 2 | 8 | 0 | 6 | 4.00 |
| John Elway | 3 | 2 | 1 | 3 | 0.67 |
| Rod Smith | 1 | 1 | 0 | 1 | 1.00 |
| Bubby Brister | 1 | –1 | 0 | –1 | –1.00 |
Broncos receiving
| | Rec (Note: Receptions caught) | Yds | TD | LG | Target (Note: Times targeted) |
| Rod Smith | 5 | 152 | 1 | 80 | 7 |
| Ed McCaffrey | 5 | 72 | 0 | 25 | 7 |
| Byron Chamberlain | 3 | 29 | 0 | 13 | 4 |
| Terrell Davis | 2 | 50 | 0 | 39 | 3 |
| Shannon Sharpe | 2 | 26 | 0 | 14 | 4 |
| Howard Griffith | 1 | 7 | 0 | 7 | 1 |
| Dwayne Carswell | 0 | 0 | 0 | 0 | 1 |
| Willie Green | 0 | 0 | 0 | 0 | 1 |

Falcons passing
| | C/ATT | Yds | TD | INT | Rating |
|---|---|---|---|---|---|
| Chris Chandler | 19/35 | 219 | 1 | 3 | 47.2 |
Falcons rushing
| | Car | Yds | TD | LG | Yds/Car |
| Jamal Anderson | 18 | 96 | 0 | 15 | 5.33 |
| Chris Chandler | 4 | 30 | 0 | 12 | 7.50 |
| Tim Dwight | 1 | 5 | 0 | 5 | 5.00 |
Falcons receiving
| | Rec | Yds | TD | LG | Target |
| Terance Mathis | 7 | 85 | 1 | 30 | 8 |
| Tony Martin | 5 | 79 | 0 | 23 | 8 |
| Jamal Anderson | 3 | 16 | 0 | 9 | 4 |
| Ronnie Harris | 2 | 21 | 0 | 13 | 3 |
| O. J. Santiago | 1 | 13 | 0 | 13 | 4 |
| Brian Kozlowski | 1 | 5 | 0 | 5 | 1 |
| Tim Dwight | 0 | 0 | 0 | 0 | 5 |
| Harold Green | 0 | 0 | 0 | 0 | 1 |

=== Records set ===
The following records were set in Super Bowl XXXIII, according to the official NFL.com boxscore, the 2017 NFL Record & Fact Book and the Pro-Football-Reference.com game summary.
Some records have to meet NFL minimum number of attempts to be recognized. The minimums are shown (in parentheses).

Player records set
| Most passing attempts, career | 152 | John Elway (Denver) |
| Most interceptions thrown, career | 8 | John Elway (Denver) |
| Most interception yards gained, game | 108 yards | Darrien Gordon (Denver) |
| Most interception yards gained, career | 108 yards | Darrien Gordon (Denver) |
| Highest kickoff return average, career (4 returns) | 42 yards (5–210) | Tim Dwight (Atlanta) |
Records tied
| Most kickoff returns for touchdowns, game | 1 | Tim Dwight |

Team records set
| Most yards gained by interception return | 136 | Broncos |
| Fewest punts, game | 1 | Falcons; Broncos |
Records tied
| Most consecutive Super Bowl victories | 2 | Broncos |
| Fewest times sacked | 0 | Broncos |
| Fewest penalties, game | 0 | Broncos |
| Fewest yards penalized, game | 0 | Broncos |
| Fewest punt returns, game | 0 | Falcons; Broncos |
| Most kickoff returns for touchdowns, game | 1 | Falcons |
| Fewest rushing touchdowns | 0 | Falcons |

Records set, both team totals
| | Total | Broncos | Falcons |
|---|---|---|---|
| Most yards gained by interception return | 137 yards | 136 | 1 |
| Fewest punts | 2 | 1 | 1 |
Records tied, both team totals
| Most field goals attempted | 7 | 4 | 3 |
| Fewest punt returns | 0 | 0 | 0 |
| Fewest punt return yards gained | 0 yards | 0 | 0 |

== Starting lineups ==
Hall of Fame‡

| Denver | Position | Position | Atlanta |
|---|---|---|---|
Offense
| Rod Smith | WR | | Tony Martin |
| Tony Jones | LT | | Bob Whitfield |
| Mark Schlereth | LG | | Calvin Collins |
| Tom Nalen | C | | Robbie Tobeck |
| Dan Neil | RG | | Gene Williams |
| Harry Swayne | RT | | Ephraim Salaam |
| Shannon Sharpe‡ | TE | | O.J. Santiago |
| Ed McCaffrey | WR | | Terance Mathis |
| John Elway‡ | QB | | Chris Chandler |
| Terrell Davis‡ | RB | | Jamal Anderson |
| Howard Griffith | FB | | Brian Kozlowski |
Defense
| Harald Hasselbach | LE | | Lester Archambeau |
| Keith Traylor | LT | | Travis Hall |
| Trevor Pryce | RT | | Shane Dronett |
| Maa Tanuvasa | RE | | Chuck Smith |
| John Mobley | LLB | WLB | Cornelius Bennett |
| Glenn Cadrez | MLB | | Jessie Tuggle |
| Bill Romanowski | RLB | SLB | Henri Crockett |
| Ray Crockett | LCB | | Ray Buchanan |
| Darrien Gordon | RCB | | Michael Booker |
| Tyrone Braxton | SS | | William White |
| Steve Atwater‡ | FS | | Eugene Robinson |

== Officials ==
- Referee: Bernie Kukar #86 first Super Bowl
- Umpire: Jim Daopoulos #75 first Super Bowl
- Head linesman: Sanford Rivers #121 first Super Bowl
- Line judge: Ron Baynes #56 second Super Bowl (XXIX)
- Field judge: Tim Millis #80 second Super Bowl (XXIX)
- Side judge: Gary Lane #120 second Super Bowl (XXIII)
- Back judge: Don Hakes #96 third Super Bowl (XVI, XXX)
- Alternate referee: Gerald Austin #34 (side judge for XXIV, referee for XXXI and later XXXV)
- Alternate umpire: Chad Brown #31 (umpire for XXXV and XLV)

Prior to the start of the 1998 NFL season, the league swapped position titles with the field judge and back judge.
