= Michael Booker =

American football player (born 1975)

No. 20, 33
- Position: Cornerback

Personal information
- Born: April 27, 1975 (age 51); Cincinnati, Ohio, U.S.
- Listed height: 6 ft 2 in (1.88 m)
- Listed weight: 200 lb (91 kg)

Career information
- High school: El Camino (Oceanside, California)
- College: Nebraska
- NFL draft: 1997: 1st round, 11th overall pick

Career history
- Atlanta Falcons (1997–1999); Tennessee Titans (2000–2001)

Awards and highlights
- 2× National champion (1994, 1995); Second-team All-Big 12 (1996)

Career NFL statistics
- Tackles: 109
- Interceptions: 8
- Passes defended: 14
- Stats at Pro Football Reference

Michael Allen Booker Jr. (born April 27, 1975) is an American former professional football player who was a cornerback for five seasons in the National Football League (NFL) from 1997 to 2001. He played college football for the Nebraska Cornhuskers football.

== Early life ==
Michael Booker started playing football later in his childhood. Once he started his athletic skills and technique definitely showed up. While at El Camino High as a cornerback, Booker was a two-year starter and letterman under head coach Herb Meyer. Booker earned all-league honors twice, was named the Long Beach Pre-Telegram BEST in the West and was co-defensive player of the year in the Southern California area. Booker finished 12–2 in 1992 and ranked seventh in the state.

== College career ==
During 1996, Booker was one of the most watched players at the University of Nebraska. Booker was the MVP on defense in the 1996 Fiesta Bowl against Florida. With his four-tackle, three-breakup, and interception touchdown performance he received attention from everyone including scouts from the NFL.

=== Awards while at the University of Nebraska ===
- Member of Two Nebraska National Championship Teams (1994, 1995)
- Second-team All-Big 12 (AP, Coaches, 1996)
- Fiesta Bowl Defensive MVP (1996)
- Nebraska Defensive Player-of-the-Game vs. Arizona State (1995)

== Professional career ==
Booker was selected by the Atlanta Falcons with the 11th overall pick in the first round of the 1997 NFL draft. Booker played 3 seasons with the Falcons, as well as in Super Bowl XXXIII, which the Falcons lost to the Denver Broncos.

== NFL career statistics ==
Legend
**Bold**	Career high

=== Regular season ===
Year	Team	Games		Tackles				Interceptions				Fumbles			
Year	Team	GP	GS	Comb	Solo	Ast	Sck	Int	Yds	TD	Lng	FF	FR	Yds	TD
1997	ATL	15	3	21	19	2	0.0	**3**	16	0	10	0	0	0	0
1998	ATL	14	6	**35**	**32**	3	0.0	1	**27**	0	**27**	0	**1**	**5**	0
1999	ATL	13	1	23	20	3	0.0	2	10	0	10	0	0	0	0
2000	TEN	15	1	19	15	**4**	0.0	1	2	0	2	0	0	0	0
2001	TEN	16	0	11	10	1	0.0	1	0	0	0	0	0	0	0
		73	11	109	96	13	0.0	8	55	0	27	0	1	5	0

=== Playoffs ===
Year	Team	Games		Tackles				Interceptions				Fumbles			
Year	Team	GP	GS	Comb	Solo	Ast	Sck	Int	Yds	TD	Lng	FF	FR	Yds	TD
1998	ATL	3	3	**7**	**6**	**1**	0.0	0	0	0	0	0	0	0	0
2000	TEN	1	0	0	0	0	0.0	0	0	0	0	0	0	0	0
		4	3	7	6	1	0.0	0	0	0	0	0	0	0	0
