= Darrien Gordon =

American football player (born 1970)

No. 21, 23
- Position: Cornerback

Personal information
- Born: November 14, 1970 (age 55); Shawnee, Oklahoma, U.S.
- Listed height: 5 ft 11 in (1.80 m)
- Listed weight: 184 lb (83 kg)

Career information
- High school: Shawnee
- College: Stanford
- NFL draft: 1993: 1st round, 22nd overall pick

Career history
- San Diego Chargers (1993–1996); Denver Broncos (1997–1998); Oakland Raiders (1999–2000); Atlanta Falcons (2001); Green Bay Packers (2002); Oakland Raiders (2002)

Awards and highlights
- 2× Super Bowl champion (XXXII, XXXIII); Second-team All-Pro (1997); PFWA All-Rookie Team (1993); Second-team All-Pac-10 (1992)

Career NFL statistics
- Tackles: 383
- Sacks: 5
- Fumble recoveries: 17
- Interceptions: 19
- Return yards: 3,671
- Total touchdowns: 9
- Stats at Pro Football Reference

Darrien Jamal Gordon (born November 14, 1970) is an American former professional football player who was a cornerback for 10 seasons in the National Football League (NFL) (1993–2002). He was selected by the San Diego Chargers in the first round of the 1993 NFL draft. During his NFL career, he played for five teams, appearing in four Super Bowls. Before his NFL career, Gordon played college football for the Stanford Cardinal, intercepting nine passes in three seasons. Since the NFL Scouting Combine began in 1985, he is one of three players who have been drafted in the first round after not being invited to the combine.

Gordon spent his first four years in the NFL with the San Diego Chargers, assisting the team to a championship appearance in Super Bowl XXIX. He started all 16 games in each season with the Chargers, and excelled both on defense and as a punt returner on special teams. His best season with San Diego was in their Super Bowl year of 1994, when he recorded 4 interceptions and 2 fumble recoveries on defense, while gaining 475 yards on punt returns and scoring 2 punt return touchdowns, the most by any player that season.

In 1997, Gordon joined the Denver Broncos and had another superb season, recording 4 interceptions for 64 return yards and a touchdown, while recovering 4 fumbles. He also had a great year as a punt returner, gaining a career-high 543 yards and scoring a league leading 3 touchdowns. His team finished the season with a 12–4 record and made it to Super Bowl XXXII, where Gordon won his first championship ring. In the following season, the Broncos recorded a 14–2 record and made it back to the Super Bowl again. Gordon's performance in Super Bowl XXXIII was a key factor in Denver's 34–19 win over the Atlanta Falcons. He intercepted 2 passes from Falcons quarterback Chris Chandler in the end zone during the fourth quarter and returned them for a total of 108 yards, setting up 2 Broncos touchdowns that put the game out of reach. His 108 interception return yards were a Super Bowl record. He also was a big factor in Denver's win over the New York Jets in the AFC title game that year, intercepting two passes from Vinny Testaverde and returning a punt 36 yards to set up a Terrell Davis touchdown.

As of 2017's NFL off-season, Darrien Gordon held at least 16 Broncos franchise records, including:

- Punt Returns: playoff season (7 in 1998), playoff game (5 on 1999-01-17 NYJ)
- Punt Ret Yds: game (168 on 1997-11-09 CAR), playoffs (162), playoff season (93 in 1998)
- Yds/PR: career (12.46), game (33.6 on 1997-11-09 CAR), playoffs (14.73), playoff season (13.29 in 1998)
- Punt Ret TDs: game (2 on 1997-11-09 CAR; with Rick Upchurch)
- Interceptions: playoffs (5), playoff season (4 in 1998), playoff game (2 on 1999-01-17 NYJ and 1999-01-31 N-ATL; shared with 2 others)
- Int Ret Yds: playoffs (156), playoff season (156 in 1998), playoff game (108 on 1999-01-31 N-ATL)

Gordon spent the next 2 seasons with the Oakland Raiders, and then 1 year with the Falcons in 2001. His final season in 2002 was spent with the Raiders, where he made his fourth championship appearance in Super Bowl XXXVII. He retired after the Raiders 48–21 loss to Tampa Bay Buccaneers in the game.

In his 10 NFL seasons, Gordon recorded 335 tackles, 5 sacks, 19 interceptions (which he returned for 330 yards), 40 pass deflections, 4 forced fumbles, and 7 fumble recoveries on defense (returning them for 127 yards). On special teams, he recovered 10 fumbles, returned 314 punts for 3,601 yards, and gained 70 yards on 5 kickoff returns. At the time of his retirement, his 3,601 punt return yards were the 3rd most in NFL history.

Overall, Gordon gained 4,128 total non-offensive yards and scored 9 non-offensive touchdowns (2 interception returns, 1 fumble return, and 6 punt returns).

Gordon was born to James and Goldia Gordon. He graduated from Shawnee High School in 1989 where he was an All-State football player and two-time state champion wrestler as well as an honor student.
