= O. J. Santiago =

Canadian football player and coach (born 1974)

O.J. Santiago
No. 88, 80, 87, 83
- Position: Tight end

Personal information
- Born: April 4, 1974 (age 52); Whitby, Ontario, Canada
- Listed height: 6 ft 7 in (2.01 m)
- Listed weight: 265 lb (120 kg)

Career information
- High school: St. Michael's College School (Toronto, Ontario)
- College: Kent State
- NFL draft: 1997: 3rd round, 70th overall pick
- CFL draft: 1997: 5th round, 40th overall pick

Career history

Playing
- Atlanta Falcons (1997–1999); Dallas Cowboys (2000); Cleveland Browns (2000–2001); Minnesota Vikings (2002)*; Oakland Raiders (2003); Denver Broncos (2004)*; Oakland Raiders (2006)*; New England Patriots (2006); Oakland Raiders (2007)*; Montreal Alouettes (2010)
- * Offseason or practice squad member only

Coaching
- Kent State (2016) Student assistant; Kent State (2017–present) Tight ends coach

Awards and highlights
- All-MAC (1996)

Career NFL statistics
- Receptions: 81
- Receiving yards: 1,041
- Receiving touchdowns: 9
- Stats at Pro Football Reference
- Stats at CFL.ca (archive)

Otis Jason Santiago (born April 4, 1974) is a Canadian former professional football player who was a tight end in the National Football League (NFL) for the Atlanta Falcons, Dallas Cowboys, Oakland Raiders and Cleveland Browns. He also was a member of the Montreal Alouettes in the Canadian Football League (CFL). He played college football for the Kent State Golden Flashes.

== Early life ==
Santiago who is of Puerto Rican and Dominican descent, attended St. Michael's College School in Toronto, where he was an All-Canadian first-team tight end. He played both ways also starting on the defensive line, while returning kickoffs and punts as well. He helped his school win 2 district titles. As a senior, he was named to the Toronto Sun and Toronto Star All-star football teams.

He contributed to the school winning a pair of district championships in basketball. He competed in track in the shot put and discus throw.

== College career ==
Santiago accepted a football scholarship from Kent State University. As a junior, he was named the starter at tight end, registering 28 receptions for 297 yards and 2 touchdowns. As a senior, he posted 26 receptions for 339 yards and 2 touchdowns.

He started 22 of 33 career games and was named to the MAC All-Academic first-team for three straight seasons. He finished his college career with 62 receptions for 730 yards with an 11.8-yard average and 4 touchdowns.

== Professional career ==
Santiago was selected by the Atlanta Falcons in the third round (70th overall) of the 1997 NFL draft. He also was selected by the Edmonton Eskimos in the fifth round (40th overall) of the 1997 CFL draft.

As a rookie, the team was moving from a run and shoot to a traditional offense and he earned the starter job over Brian Kozlowski. He was placed on the injured reserve list, after fracturing his fibula in the twelfth game of the season against the St. Louis Rams. He started 11 games, totaling 17 receptions for 217 yards and 2 touchdowns, for an average of 12.8 yards per catch.

In 1998, Santiago contributed to the team reaching Super Bowl XXXIII, posting 27 receptions for 478 yards and 5 touchdowns in 16 games, for an average of 15.9 yards per catch. He is famously known for popularizing a dance to celebrate a touchdown in which he flapped his arms as if they were wings and rhythmically bouncing side-to-side in the crowd's direction, that would later become known as the "Dirty Bird".

In 1999, he started 14 games, catching 15 receptions for 174 yards and no touchdowns. In 2000, he was passed on the depth chart by Reggie Kelly. On August 27, he was traded to the Dallas Cowboys in exchange for a 2001 fourth round selection (#102-Matt Stewart) and a 2002 seventh round selection (#217-Michael Coleman).

In 2000, the Cowboys acquired him to backup David LaFleur and Jackie Harris. He played mainly on special teams, until being cut on November 21.

On November 22, he was claimed off waivers by the Cleveland Browns and was declared inactive for the final 4 games. In 2001, he started 12 games after Rickey Dudley was placed on the injured reserve list with a Lis Franc foot injury. His production fell to 17 receptions for 153 yards and 2 touchdowns and he wasn't re-signed after the season.

On July 15, 2002, he was signed as a free agent by the Minnesota Vikings, but injured his foot and knee in training camp and was waived injured on August 27.

On March 8, 2003, he signed with the Oakland Raiders, where he played in 12 games (starts), with 5 receptions for 69 receiving yards, and averaging 13.8 yards per catch. Having already totaled 972 yards before joining the Raiders, he was able to reach the 1,000 yard milestone during his short tenure with the Northern California team.

On April 15, 2004, Santiago was signed by the Denver Broncos who released him at the end of training camp on August 31.

On May 23, 2006, Santiago signed with the Oakland Raiders after not suiting up for the 2005 season, but was waived with an injury settlement on September 9. On December 13, he signed with the New England Patriots, who released him 2 days later after injuring his foot.

On August 7, 2007, the Oakland Raiders signed Santiago as a free agent. He was released before the season began on September 1. In his career in the NFL, he played in 68 games, gaining a total of 1,041 yards for an average of 12.9 yards per catch and 9 touchdowns.

On May 14, 2010, after being 3 years out of football, he was signed as a free agent by the Montreal Alouettes of the Canadian Football League, reuniting with Marc Trestman, who was his offensive coordinator with the Oakland Raiders. He was limited with a hamstring injury and was released on August 28.

== Personal life ==
In 2016, he returned to Kent State as a student assistant coach and was promoted to tight ends coach and assistant special teams coordinator the following season.
