= Ronnie Harris (American football) =

American football player (born 1970)

No. 84, 11, 81, 82
- Position: Wide receiver

Personal information
- Born: June 4, 1970 (age 56); Granada Hills, California, U.S.
- Listed height: 5 ft 11 in (1.80 m)
- Listed weight: 179 lb (81 kg)

Career information
- High school: Valley Christian
- College: Oregon
- NFL draft: 1993: undrafted

Career history
- New England Patriots (1993–1994); Seattle Seahawks (1994-1998); Atlanta Falcons (1998-1999)

Career NFL statistics
- Receptions: 18
- Receiving yards: 296
- Return yards: 1,280
- Stats at Pro Football Reference

Ronnie Harris (born June 4, 1970) is an American former professional football player who was a wide receiver for seven seasons in the National Football League (NFL) for the New England Patriots, Seattle Seahawks, and Atlanta Falcons. He played college football for the Oregon Ducks.

Although he was best known for his play on special teams, Harris made a key 29 yard catch in the Falcons upset victory in the 1999 NFC Championship over the Minnesota Vikings. Since retiring from football, Ronnie has worked for Pfizer pharmaceuticals in primary care, Cardiovascular Specialty and Pain Management. Additionally Ronnie has earned a Masters of Arts in Ministry and Leadership from Western Seminary in Portland Oregon and worked in various churches as a youth pastor, associate pastor and campus pastor. Ronnie is currently the Lead Pastor at Edgewood Church in Edmonds, Wa.

Harris also ran track while at the University of Oregon and holds the second fastest indoor 50 meter time ever recorded at 5.7 seconds. Ronnie also anchored the men’s 4x100 meter relay, which broke the school record in 1992 with a time of 39.80 seconds. This record stood for 13 years, but was subsequently broken numerous times.
