= Terrell Davis =

American football player (born 1972)

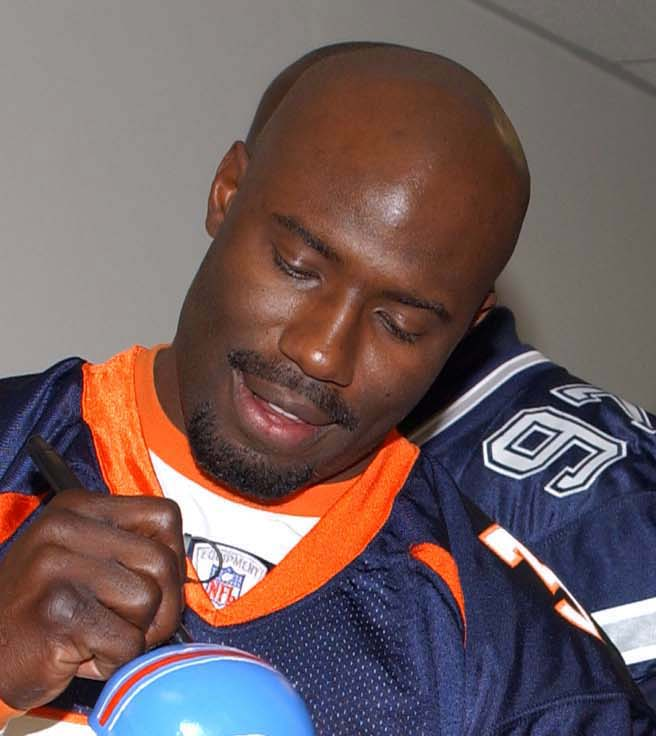
- Davis in Jacksonville, Florida in 2005

No. 30
- Position: Running back

Personal information
- Born: October 28, 1972 (age 54); San Diego, California, U.S.
- Listed height: 5 ft 11 in (1.80 m)
- Listed weight: 206 lb (93 kg)

Career information
- High school: Lincoln (San Diego)
- College: Long Beach State (1990–1991); Georgia (1992–1994)
- NFL draft: 1995: 6th round, 196th overall pick

Career history
- Denver Broncos (1995–2001)

Awards and highlights
- 2× Super Bowl champion (XXXII, XXXIII); Super Bowl MVP (XXXII); NFL Most Valuable Player (1998); 2× NFL Offensive Player of the Year (1996, 1998); 3× First-team All-Pro (1996–1998); 3× Pro Bowl (1996–1998); NFL rushing yards leader (1998); 2× NFL rushing touchdowns leader (1997, 1998); NFL 1990s All-Decade Team; PFWA All-Rookie Team (1995); Denver Broncos Ring of Fame

Career NFL statistics
- Rushing yards: 7,607
- Yards per carry: 4.6
- Rushing touchdowns: 60
- Stats at Pro Football Reference
- Pro Football Hall of Fame

Terrell Lamar Davis (born October 28, 1972) is an American former professional football player who was a running back for the Denver Broncos of the National Football League (NFL) from 1995 to 2001. Despite his short seven-year career (with four full seasons), Davis is often regarded as one of the greatest running backs of all time.

Davis was selected by the Broncos in the sixth round (196th pick overall) of the 1995 NFL draft. He is the Denver Broncos' all-time leading rusher, with 7,607 rushing yards. Davis still holds the NFL record for most rushing touchdowns in a single postseason, scoring eight in the 1997 playoffs, culminating in him winning the Super Bowl MVP award. In 1998, he became only the fourth NFL player to rush for over 2,000 yards in a season. As a player, he was given the nickname "T. D." by players, fans and the media; this denoted both the initials of his first and last name as well as being an abbreviation for touchdown. Davis is also credited with starting the "Mile High Salute", a celebratory tradition among Denver Broncos players after scoring a touchdown. He was elected into the Pro Football Hall of Fame in 2017.

== Early life ==
Davis was born to nurse Kateree Davis, a mother of eight children, and father Joe Davis. His father died when Terrell was 14 years old.

In his senior year at Lincoln High School, the coaches gave him a chance at fullback, in a three-back formation. He was given playing time in other positions, including kicker, and helped lead his team to a 12–2 record. Davis set the Lincoln Prep record in the discus throw as a member of the track team. After graduation, Davis went on to play baseball at Long Beach State University. His brother Reggie Webb was a tailback there before him, and he persuaded the school to grant Davis a scholarship.

== College career ==
At Long Beach State, Davis joined the football team that was coached by former Washington Redskins coach George Allen. He redshirted his freshman year in order to give him an extra year of eligibility. Davis never played an official game for coach Allen because Allen died after the end of the 1990 season. Davis played the following season and rushed for 262 yards on 55 carries.

Long Beach State eliminated its football program due to budget concerns at the end of the 1991 season. Davis transferred to the University of Georgia. During his first season with the Bulldogs, Davis backed up future NFL starting running back Garrison Hearst. After Hearst graduated, Davis became the top running back during the 1993 season, and rushed for 824 yards on 167 carries. Davis's senior season at Georgia got off to a rocky start when he aggravated a tear in his hamstring muscle against Tennessee early in the season, which took him out of the lineup for three games. Davis ran for 445 yards on 67 carries that year, but in his last two games, he rushed for 113 and 121 yards, respectively. After the season, he was invited to the Blue–Gray Football Classic game. Davis's reputation for being injury-prone hurt his standing in the NFL draft, along with the fact that Coach Goff denied scouts game film of Davis. Davis graduated from the University of Georgia with a Bachelor of Science degree in Consumer Economics.

== Professional career ==
Pre-draft measurables
Height	Weight	Arm length	Hand span	40-yard dash	10-yard split	20-yard split	20-yard shuttle	Vertical jump
5 ft 11 5/8 in (1.82 m)	213 lb (97 kg)	30 7/8 in (0.78 m)	9 in (0.23 m)	4.72 s	1.70 s	2.74 s	4.41 s	35 in (0.89 m)
All values from the 1995 NFL Combine

In 1995, newly appointed Denver Broncos head coach Mike Shanahan drafted Davis in the sixth round of the 1995 NFL Draft. Davis entered training camp as the sixth string tailback and was a longshot to make the team. He managed to impress the Broncos coaching staff after his second pre-season game, most notably with a crushing hit as a member of special teams. Davis kept improving with each pre-season game and was promoted to starting running back for the season's opening game. With Davis at running back, the Broncos possessed the potent running attack that they had previously lacked. Davis started 14 games during the 1995 season, carrying the ball 237 times, averaging 4.7 yards per run, and scoring eight touchdowns. Davis finished his season with a total of 1,117 rushing yards, becoming the lowest drafted player to ever gain over 1,000 yards rushing in his rookie season.

In 1996, Davis signed, what was at that time a lucrative new five-year contract with the Broncos that was worth $6.8 million. That season, he rushed for a total of 1,538 yards and set a Denver Broncos record for rushing touchdowns with 13. The Broncos ended that season with a 13–3 record, tied with the Green Bay Packers for the best in the NFL that year. In the postseason, Davis ran for 6.5 yards per attempt in a loss to Jacksonville. Davis was selected as a first-team All-Pro and Pro Bowl for the first of three consecutive seasons.

=== 1997, Super Bowl XXXII ===
In 1997, Davis broke his own records with 1,750 yards and a league-leading 15 rushing touchdowns. The 12–4 Broncos again faced Jacksonville in their first playoff game; this time Davis had 184 yards rushing and 2 touchdowns in the 42–17 blowout. By rushing for over 100 yards rushing in all four of Denver's postseason games, Davis joined John Riggins as the only player to rush for over 100 yards a game four times in a single postseason. Additionally, Davis was named Super Bowl MVP in Super Bowl XXXII against the then-world champion Green Bay Packers, with 157 rushing yards and a Super Bowl record three rushing touchdowns despite having to sit out the second quarter due to a migraine. Prior to this 31–24 victory, the Broncos had lost each of their four previous Super Bowl appearances, and the AFC had a 13-year losing streak.

=== 1998, Super Bowl XXXIII ===
In 1998, Davis rushed for 2,008 yards becoming a member of the 2000 rushing yards club, the fourth-highest rushing total in history at the time. This performance earned him league MVP honors, his third straight AFC rushing title, his first NFL rushing title, and his second time being named NFL Offensive Player of the Year by the Associated Press. At the end of the season, the Broncos beat the Atlanta Falcons in Super Bowl XXXIII, with Davis recording 102 rushing yards and 50 receiving yards.

Super Bowl XXXIII was the last postseason game in which Davis would play. In his 8 postseason games from 1996 to 1998, his numbers were staggering: 204 carries for 1,140 yards and 12 touchdowns, along with 19 receptions for 131 yards. This included a streak of 7 consecutive games with over 100 rushing yards, all of which the Broncos won, breaking the previous record for consecutive 100 rushing yard postseason games held by John Riggins (6). Even in the sole playoff game in which Davis didn't gain 100 rushing yards, he still had an impressive performance, rushing for 91 yards and a touchdown and catching 7 passes for 27 yards.

Davis was sent to the Pro Bowl in the 1996, 1997, and 1998 seasons. Nicknamed "TD", Davis popularized the "Mile High Salute", a military-style salute given to fans and teammates in celebration of a touchdown; Davis explained in 2017 that he felt the "mentality" needed to play running back was similar to that for soldiers, and the gesture was a "sign of respect" for service members.

=== Later career ===
After the 1998 season, Davis was plagued with injuries and saw action infrequently. In 1999, Davis tore the anterior cruciate ligament and medial collateral ligament of his right knee while trying to make a tackle on an interception thrown against the New York Jets, during the fourth game of the season. This injury kept him out for the remainder of the year.

In the 2000 season, Davis was sidelined for all but five games because of a stress reaction injury in his lower leg. In 2001, he only played in eight games because of arthroscopic surgery on both knees.

Davis retired during the preseason of 2002. He walked through the tunnel in uniform for the final time during a preseason Denver–San Francisco 49ers matchup held at Invesco Field at Mile High. To a standing ovation, he gave a mile-high salute to the fans and was hugged by his teammates. After walking to midfield as the lone Broncos player at the coin toss, Davis retreated to the sideline. He spent the second half in street clothes. The following week, upon his request, he was placed on injured reserve, ending his season and effectively ending his career.

Through his first four seasons, Davis rushed for 6,413 yards (4.8 yards per carry) and 56 touchdowns. Among the 24 modern-era Hall of Fame halfbacks and fullbacks, only Earl Campbell (6,457, 4.6 yards per carry) and Eric Dickerson (6,968, 4.8 yards per carry) had more rushing yards during their first four seasons; no member of the Hall of Fame matched Davis's first-four-season 56 rushing touchdowns. Davis was selected for ESPN's All-Time 40-Man Super Bowl roster as a running back for his performances in Super Bowls XXXII and XXXIII.

Overall, Davis finished his seven NFL seasons with 7,607 rushing yards, 169 receptions for 1,280 yards, and 65 touchdowns (60 rushing and 5 receiving). He, John Elway, and Peyton Manning are the only three Broncos to be named league MVP. Davis is one of only six players ever to rush for more than 1,000 yards in the postseason (1,140), and out of the six he is the only one to do so in a career that lasted less than 12 seasons. Davis finished his career with 12 playoff rushing touchdowns, good for fourth all-time tied with Marshawn Lynch and John Riggins.

=== Legacy ===
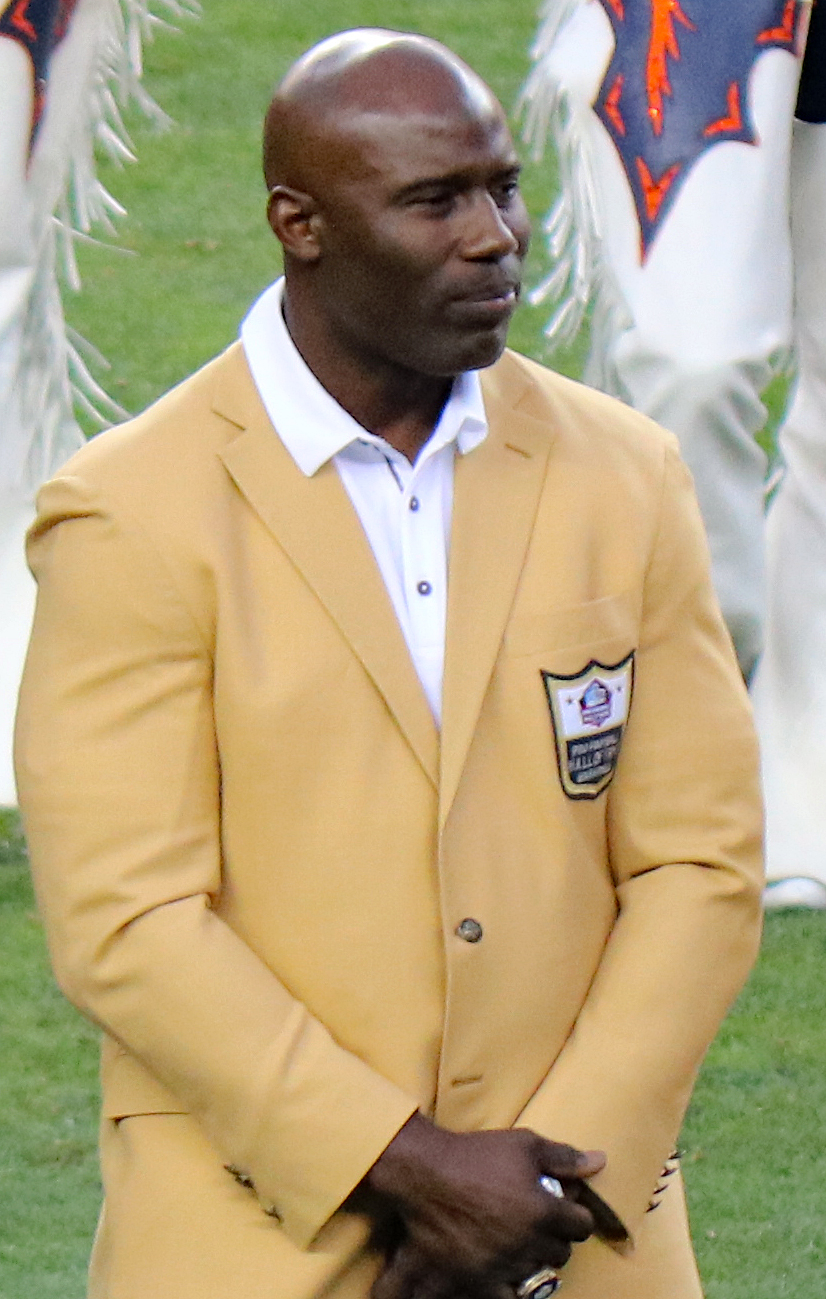
Davis in Denver in 2017

Davis was named The Sporting News NFL Player of the Year in 1998. In 2004, Davis was inducted into the Colorado Sports Hall of Fame. Davis was one of the semifinalists for the 2007 Pro Football Hall of Fame in his first year of eligibility.

On July 27, 2007, it was announced that Davis would be inducted into the Denver Broncos Ring of Fame. His induction ceremony took place at Invesco Field at Mile High on September 23, 2007, in a Broncos home game against the Jacksonville Jaguars. In 2006, Davis was inducted into the Breitbard Hall of Fame. On February 7, 2016, Davis and John Elway served as the Broncos' honorary captains at Super Bowl 50 in Santa Clara, California. They also appeared at the pre-game ceremony honoring the past 50 Super Bowl MVPs. Davis was also one of the players who did the Trophy Presentation when the Broncos won the Super Bowl. On August 4, 2017, Davis was inducted into the Pro Football Hall of Fame in his eleventh year of eligibility.

== Career statistics ==
Legend
	AP NFL MVP & OPOTY
	AP NFL Offensive Player of the Year
	Super Bowl MVP
	Won the Super Bowl
	NFL record
	Led the league
**Bold**	Career high

=== NFL ===
==== Regular season ====
Year	Team	Games		Rushing					Receiving					Fumbles	
Year	Team	GP	GS	Att	Yds	Avg	Lng	TD	Rec	Yds	Avg	Lng	TD	Fum	Lost
1995	DEN	14	14	237	1,117	4.7	60	7	**49**	**367**	7.5	31	1	**5**	2
1996	DEN	16	16	345	1,538	4.5	**71**	13	36	310	8.6	23	**2**	**5**	**3**
1997	DEN	15	15	369	1,750	4.7	50	15	42	287	6.8	25	0	4	0
1998	DEN	16	16	**392**	**2,008**	**5.1**	70	**21**	25	217	**8.7**	**35**	**2**	2	2
1999	DEN	4	4	67	211	3.1	26	2	3	26	**8.7**	10	0	1	1
2000	DEN	5	5	78	282	3.6	24	2	2	4	2.0	5	0	1	0
2001	DEN	8	8	167	701	4.2	57	0	12	69	5.8	16	0	2	0
Career		78	78	1,655	7,607	4.6	71	60	169	1,280	7.6	35	5	20	8

==== Postseason ====
Year	Team	Games		Rushing					Receiving					Fumbles	
Year	Team	GP	GS	Att	Yds	Avg	Lng	TD	Rec	Yds	Avg	Lng	TD	Fum	Lost
1996	DEN	1	1	14	91	**6.5**	47	1	7	27	3.4	6	0	0	0
1997	DEN	4	4	**112**	**581**	5.2	59	**8**	**8**	38	4.8	17	0	**4**	**2**
1998	DEN	3	3	78	468	6.0	**62**	3	4	**69**	**17.2**	**39**	0	0	0
2000	DEN	Did not play due to injury													
Career		8	8	204	1,140	5.6	62	12	19	134	7.1	39	0	4	2

=== College ===
Season	Team	Rushing					Receiving				
Season	Team	Att	Yds	Avg	Lng	TD	Rec	Yds	Avg	Lng	TD
1990	Long Beach State	Redshirted									
1991	Long Beach State	55	262	4.8	48	2	4	92	**23.0**	**75**	1
1992	Georgia	53	388	**7.3**	**61**	3	3	38	12.7	23	1
1993	Georgia	**167**	**824**	4.9	42	5	12	161	13.4	57	**3**
1994	Georgia	97	445	4.6	25	**6**	**31**	**330**	10.6	46	0
Career		372	1,919	5.4	61	16	50	621	14.9	75	5

== Career highlights ==
=== Awards and honors ===
- 2× Super Bowl champion (XXXII, XXXIII)
- Super Bowl MVP (XXXII)
- NFL Most Valuable Player (1998)
- 2× NFL Offensive Player of the Year (1996, 1998)
- 3× First-team All-Pro (1996–1998)
- 3× Pro Bowl (1996–1998)
- NFL rushing yards leader (1998)
- 2× NFL rushing touchdowns leader (1997, 1998)
- NFL 1990s All-Decade Team
- PFWA All-Rookie Team (1995)
- Denver Broncos Ring of Fame

=== Records ===
==== NFL records ====
- Most rushing touchdowns in a single postseason: (8 in 1997)
- Only player in NFL history with 2,000+ rushing yards and 20+ rushing touchdowns in a single season
- First 2,000+ yard rusher to win Super Bowl in same season
- Highest career average yards per postseason game with 142.5: (1995–2001)
- Second most rushing yards in a season including playoffs, 1998 with 2,476 yards
- Consecutive 100 yard rushing games in playoffs: (7 from 1997 to 1998)

==== Franchise records ====
As of the 2018 NFL off-season, Davis held at least 46 Broncos franchise records, including:

- Rush Attempts: career (1,655), season (392 in 1998), game (42 on 1997-10-26 @BUF), playoffs (204), playoff season (112 in 1997), playoff game (32 on 1999-01-17 NYJ)
- Rush Yards: career (7,607), season (2,008 in 1998), playoffs (1,140), playoff season (581 in 1997), playoff game (199 on 1999-01-09 MIA)
- Rush Yds/Att: playoffs (5.59), playoff game (9.48 on 1999-01-09 MIA)
- Rushing TDs: career (60), season (21 in 1998), playoffs (12), playoff season (8 in 1997), playoff game (3 on 1998-01-25 NGNB)
- Rush Yds/Game: season (125.5 in 1998), playoffs (142.5), playoff season (156 in 1998)
- Total TDs: season (23 in 1998), playoffs (12), playoff season (8 in 1997), playoff game (3 on 1998-01-25 NGNB)
- Yds from Scrimmage: season (2,225 in 1998), playoffs (1,271), playoff season (619 in 1997), playoff game (206 on 1999-01-09 MIA)
- All Purpose Yds: season (2,225 in 1998), playoffs (1,271), playoff season (619 in 1997), playoff game (206 on 1999-01-09 MIA)
- 100+ yard rushing games: career (41), season (14 in 1997, 1998), playoffs (7)
- Games with 1+ TD scored: season (15 in 1997, 1998), playoffs (7)
- Games with 2+ TD scored: career (19), season (8 in 1998), playoffs (4)
- Games with 3+ TD scored: career (7), season (3 in 1998), playoffs (1), rookie season (1; with Jon Keyworth, Mike Anderson, and Clinton Portis)
- Seasons with 1000+ rushing yards: career (4)

== Television career ==
After playing in the NFL, Davis worked for NFL Network as a correspondent and studio host for NFL Total Access. He also served as a color commentator for some NFL Europe games covered by NFL Network.

=== Other appearances ===
Davis appeared on Sesame Street in a skit with Elmo, Telly Monster, and a talking football. Elmo called Davis "the man" and Davis responded, "Thank you, thank you. I try!" The episode was filmed in December 1998 in New York, and Davis said on the episode of America's Game: The Super Bowl Champions profiling the 1998 Broncos that he was originally supposed to film the episode the day after Denver's week 15 matchup with the New York Giants which was played in Giants Stadium in New Jersey. The plan was for Davis to stay behind in New York for the day while the rest of the team flew home, assuming that the Broncos would win. However, because the Giants defeated the Broncos, Davis had to return to Denver for a Monday practice/film session with the team and then fly back to New York the next day to film his parts.

Davis guest-starred on Disney Channel's The Jersey, in an episode called "They Say It's Your Birthday" along with other sports stars Shannon Sharpe, Tim Brown, Hardy Nickerson, and Tony Siragusa. The episode originally aired on October 21, 2000.

Davis appeared on the season 5 finale of the sitcom Sister, Sister at the twins' graduation to give a speech.

Davis appeared on the August 29, 2008 episode of The Colbert Report to analyze the acceptance speech given by U.S. Democratic Party nominee Barack Obama at Invesco Field at Mile High a day earlier.

In 2023, Davis made a special guest appearance on an episode of Paramount Network's Bar Rescue, hosted by Jon Taffer, along with current NFL players Courtland Sutton, Justin Simmons, Kareem Jackson, and Bradley Chubb.

== Personal life ==
Davis resides in Temecula, California, with his wife Tamiko Nash. They have three children: sons Jackson and Myles, and daughter Dylan. He wrote an autobiography, TD: Dreams in Motion, after his first Super Bowl victory. A chapter was later added to the book covering his NFL MVP season and second championship win.

Davis was on the cover of the video game NFL GameDay 99 by 989 Sports. He made an appearance in Madden NFL 2006, serving as the player's mentor in the new NFL Superstar Mode and adds his voice to the game.

=== Legal disputes ===
In 2001, Davis was named in the Atlanta's Gold Club federal prostitution, fraud and racketeering trial. The owner, Steve Kaplan, initially denied accusations of arranging dancers for athletes, claiming that he was unaware of any sexual encounters. Employee Jana Pelnis testified that she had sex with Davis in the club. Kaplan later pleaded guilty and was fined $5 million. A sentence of three years in jail was put on the table, but Kaplan instead received a sentence of 16 months and 400 hours of community service. Davis was never charged with any criminal wrongdoing. However, Campbell Soups dropped him from their advertising shortly thereafter.

In September 2006, Davis filed a lawsuit against Liberty Mutual Fire Insurance Co. for breach of contract over its refusal to defend him in a lawsuit related to a tussle at the Hollywood Roosevelt Hotel. In the lawsuit against the hotel, Davis claimed he was assaulted by two bouncers during a party at the hotel's Tropicana Bar in October 2005. Davis said he suffered a bruised neck and damage to a surgically repaired hip. Davis and the insurance company reached a settlement, so the case was dismissed in January 2007.

In July 2024, Davis was accused of hitting a United Airlines flight attendant while traveling with his wife and children from Denver. When the plane arrived at John Wayne Airport in California, an FBI agent placed him in handcuffs and removed him from the plane. After interviewing Davis and other passengers, the FBI released him from custody when it was determined the flight attendant had made an inaccurate accusation. United apologized for the incident and claimed it took the flight attendant "out of rotation" while the matter was investigated. On July 23, Davis's legal team released a video of their client being removed from the plane and said it would be filing a lawsuit against United. By July 30, United said the flight attendant was no longer employed with the company and Davis had been removed from its no-fly list.
