= 2002 San Francisco 49ers season =

American football team season

- Owner: Denise DeBartolo York and John York
- General manager: Terry Donahue
- Head coach: Steve Mariucci
- Home stadium: 3Com Park

Results
- Record: 10–6
- Division place: 1st NFC West
- Playoffs: Won Wild Card Playoffs (vs. Giants) 39–38; Lost Divisional Playoffs (at Buccaneers) 6–31
- All-Pros: WR Terrell Owens (1st team); RB Fred Beasley (2nd team); LB Julian Peterson (2nd team)
- Pro Bowlers: QB Jeff Garcia; WR Terrell Owens; G Ron Stone; C Jeremy Newberry; DT Bryant Young; LB Julian Peterson

Uniform
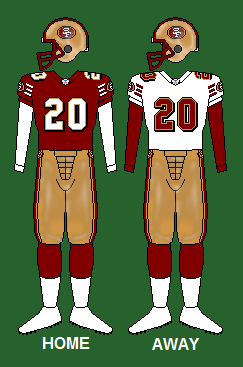

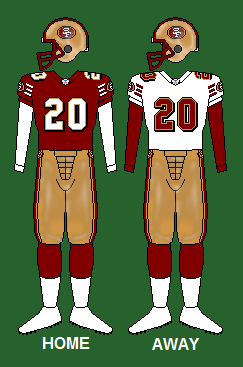
The uniform of the San Francisco 49ers, 1998-2006.

The 2002 San Francisco 49ers season was the team's 57th season, and 53rd in the National Football League (NFL) and the sixth and final under head coach Steve Mariucci.

The first season following divisional realignment, the 49ers won the new-look NFC West title with a 10–6 record; they swept their new division rivals, the Seattle Seahawks and the Arizona Cardinals while splitting with the St. Louis Rams. In the Wild Card round, the 49ers fell behind the New York Giants 38–14 but erupted with 25 unanswered points and survived a chaotic last-second field goal attempt by the Giants; the 39–38 win was the 26th playoff win in the team's history and as of 2019, it is the fourth biggest comeback in NFL playoff history. The 49ers lost the next week in the divisional round to the eventual Super Bowl champion Tampa Bay Buccaneers 31–6 and head coach Steve Mariucci was fired, the result of a power struggle with owner John York and new general manager Terry Donahue. 2002 was the last winning season for the 49ers until 2011. Until 2025, this represents the most recent season where the 49ers made the playoffs, but not the NFC Championship Game or Super Bowl.

== Offseason ==
Additions	Subtractions
FS Tony Parrish (Bears)	FS Lance Schulters (Titans)
G Ron Stone (Giants)	G Ray Brown (Lions)
DE Sean Moran (Rams)	QB Rick Mirer (Raiders)
	LB Terry Killens (Broncos)

=== NFL draft ===
2002 San Francisco 49ers draft
Round	Pick	Player	Position	College	Notes
1	27	Mike Rumph	CB	Miami (FL)	
3	69	Saleem Rasheed	LB	Alabama	From Buffalo
3		Forfeited due	to a	Salary Cap	Violation
4	102	Jeff Chandler	K	Florida	From Buffalo
4	127	Kevin Curtis	S	Texas Tech	
5	163	Brandon Doman	QB	BYU	
5	172	Josh Shaw	DT	Michigan State	compensatory selection
6	201	Mark Anelli	TE	Wisconsin	
7	239	Eric Heitmann	C	Stanford	
7	248	Kyle Kosier	T	Arizona State	
7	256	Teddy Gaines	CB	Tennessee	
Made roster † Pro Football Hall of Fame * Made at least one Pro Bowl during career

=== Undrafted free agents ===
2002 undrafted free agents of note
Player	Position	College
Kenny Harris	Cornerback	Northern Iowa
Nate Jackson	Wide receiver	Menlo College
Michael Jennings	Wide receiver	Florida State
Austin Lee	Tackle	Stanford
Brandon Moore	Linebacker	Oklahoma
Donnie O’Neal	Wide receiver	Arizona State
Darryl Sanders	Defensive End	Virginia
Matt Stanley	Fullback	UCLA
Frank Strong	Linebacker	USC

== Personnel ==
=== Staff ===
2002 San Francisco 49ers staff
Front office: Owner – Denise DeBartolo York; Owner – The DeBartolo Corporation; Director/owner's representative – John York; President/chief executive officer – Peter L. Harris; General manager – Terry Donahue; Consultant – Bill Walsh; Vice president/director of football operations – John McVay; Asst. director of football operations/salary cap – Dominic Corsell; Director of pro personnel – Bill McPherson; Head coaches: Head coach – Steve Mariucci; Offensive coaches: Offensive coordinator – Greg Knapp; Quarterbacks – Ted Tollner; Running backs – Tom Rathman; Wide receivers – George Stewart; Tight ends – Tom Batta; Offensive line – Patrick Morris; Offensive assistant – Andy Sugarman; Offensive quality control – Jason Tarver	Defensive coaches: Defensive coordinator – Jim Mora; Defensive line – Dwaine Board; Linebackers – Richard Smith; Secondary – Brett Maxie; Defensive assistant – Chris Beake; Defensive quality control – Dan Quinn; Special teams coaches: Special teams – Bruce DeHaven; Strength and conditioning: Physical development coordinator – Jerry Attaway; Strength development coordinator – Terrell Jones

=== Roster ===
2002 San Francisco 49ers roster
Quarterbacks (QB): 11 Brandon Doman; 5 Jeff Garcia; 13 Tim Rattay; Running backs (RB): 32 Kevan Barlow; 40 Fred Beasley FB; 20 Garrison Hearst; 27 Paul Smith FB; Wide receivers (WR): 81 Terrell Owens; 83 J. J. Stokes; 89 Tai Streets; 84 Cedrick Wilson; Tight ends (TE): 82 Eric Johnson; 88 Justin Swift	Offensive linemen (OL): 63 Derrick Deese T; 78 Scott Gragg T; 66 Eric Heitmann G; 72 Kyle Kosier T; 60 Ben Lynch C; 62 Jeremy Newberry C; 71 Craig Osika C; 65 Ron Stone G; 77 Matt Willig G/T; Defensive linemen (DL): 96 Andre Carter DE; 92 Jerome Davis DT; 95 John Engelberger DE; 75 Jim Flanigan DT; 99 Sean Moran DE; 91 Chike Okeafor DE; 93 Josh Shaw DT; 94 Dana Stubblefield DT; 97 Bryant Young DT	Linebackers (LB): 57 Cornelius Anthony OLB; 56 Brandon Moore OLB; 98 Julian Peterson OLB; 51 Saleem Rasheed MLB; 50 Derek Smith MLB; 54 Quincy Stewart OLB; 53 Jeff Ulbrich OLB; 55 Jamie Winborn OLB; Defensive backs (DB): 31 Zack Bronson FS; 45 Tim Hauck SS; 43 Duane Hawthorne CB; 38 Ronnie Heard FS; 25 Rashad Holman CB; 28 John Keith FS; 35 Jason Moore SS; 33 Tony Parrish SS; 29 Ahmed Plummer CB; 24 Mike Rumph CB; 36 Jason Webster CB; Special teams (ST): 3 Jeff Chandler K; 86 Brian Jennings LS; 4 Bill Lafleur P	Practice squad: 85 Mark Anelli TE; 41 Jasen Isom FB; 18 James Jordan WR; 15 Aaron Lockett WR; Reserve: 30 Kevin Curtis S (IR); 74 Dave Fiore G (IR); 22 Terry Jackson RB (IR); -- Alex Lincoln LB (NF-Inj.); 9 Cade McNown QB (IR); 21 Anthony Parker CB (IR); 25 Jamal Robertson RB (IR); 58 Frank Strong LB (IR); 23 Jimmy Williams CB (IR); Rookies in italics 53 active, 9 reserve, 4 practice squad

== Preseason ==
Week	Date	Opponent	Result	Record	Venue
1	August 4	vs. Washington Redskins	L 7–38	0–1	Osaka Dome
2	August 10	Kansas City Chiefs	L 14–17 (OT)	0–2	3Com Park
3	August 19	at Denver Broncos	W 12–7	1–2	Invesco Field
4	August 24	at Oakland Raiders	L 10–17	1–3	Network Associates Coliseum
5	August 28	San Diego Chargers	W 27–3	2–3	3Com Park

== Regular season ==
=== Schedule ===
Week	Date	Opponent	Result	Record	Venue	Attendance
1	September 5	at New York Giants	**W** 16–13	1–0	Giants Stadium	78,748
2	September 15	Denver Broncos	**L** 14–24	1–1	3Com Park	67,685
3	September 22	Washington Redskins	**W** 20–10	2–1	3Com Park	67,541
4	Bye					
5	October 6	**St. Louis Rams**	**W** 37–13	3–1	3Com Park	67,853
6	October 14	at **Seattle Seahawks**	**W** 28–21	4–1	Seahawks Stadium	66,420
7	October 20	at New Orleans Saints	**L** 27–35	4–2	Louisiana Superdome	67,903
8	October 27	**Arizona Cardinals**	**W** 38–28	5–2	3Com Park	67,173
9	November 3	at Oakland Raiders	**W** 23–20 (OT)	6–2	Network Associates Coliseum	62,660
10	November 10	Kansas City Chiefs	**W** 17–13	7–2	3Com Park	67,881
11	November 17	at San Diego Chargers	**L** 17–20 (OT)	7–3	Qualcomm Stadium	67,161
12	November 25	Philadelphia Eagles	**L** 17–38	7–4	3Com Park	67,919
13	December 1	**Seattle Seahawks**	**W** 31–24	8–4	3Com Park	67,594
14	December 8	at Dallas Cowboys	**W** 31–27	9–4	Texas Stadium	64,097
15	December 15	Green Bay Packers	**L** 14–20	9–5	3Com Park	67,947
16	December 21	at **Arizona Cardinals**	**W** 17–14	10–5	Sun Devil Stadium	44,051
17	December 30	at **St. Louis Rams**	**L** 20–31	10–6	Edward Jones Dome	66,118
Note: Intra-division opponents are in **bold** text.

=== Game summaries ===
==== Week 1: at New York Giants ====
At Giants Stadium the 49ers clawed to a 13–6 lead on three Kerry Collins interceptions, but a late Tiki Barber score tied the game 13–13. Two Jeff Garcia passes for 45 yards and three Garrison Hearst runs for seven yards set up Jose Cortez's 36-yard field goal with ten seconds left and the 16–13 49ers win.

==== Week 2: vs. Denver Broncos ====
Despite an eight-yard touchdown to Terrell Owens (suffering from a season-long groin issue), Jeff Garcia struggled in San Francisco's home opener, fumbling in the third quarter then throwing an interception to Deltha O'Neal in the fourth. A late rushing score by Garcia made the final score 24–14 for the Broncos. |Weather= 68 °F (20 °C) (Sunny)

==== Week 3: vs. Washington Redskins ====
Jeff Garcia and Tim Rattay combined for just 125 passing yards as the Niners defeated the Redskins 20–10. Food poisoning forced Garcia out of the game. "I just didn't feel real crisp," Garcia said in the postgame press conference. |Weather= 71 °F (22 °C) (Sunny)

==== Week 5: vs. St. Louis Rams ====
The Rams' collapse following their loss in Super Bowl XXXVI continued as Jamie Martin started and was intercepted twice. Garrison Hearst and Kevan Barlow rushed for 166 yards as the Niners pummeled the Rams 37–13. |Weather= 84 °F (29 °C) (Sunny)

==== Week 6: at Seattle Seahawks ====
Week 6: San Francisco 49ers (3–1) at Seattle Seahawks (1–3) – Game summary

Quarter	1	2	3	4	Total
**49ers**	10	3	7	8	**28**
Seahawks	7	7	7	0	**21**

at Seahawks Stadium, Seattle

- Date: October 14
- Game time: 6:09pm local
- Game weather: clear, 64 °F (18 °C), 48% humidity, wind N 6 miles per hour (9.7 km/h)
- Game attendance: 66,420
- Referee: Bill Leavy
- TV announcers (ABC): Al Michaels, John Madden, Melissa Stark
- Gamecenter, Gamebook

Game information

**First quarter**

- SF – José Cortéz 35-yard field goal, 10:06 (SF 3–0)
- SF – Terrell Owens 8-yard pass from Jeff Garcia (José Cortéz kick), 6:50 (SF 10–0)
- SEA – Mack Strong 5-yard pass from Trent Dilfer (Rian Lindell kick), 1:45 (SF 10–7)

**Second quarter**

- SEA – Bobby Engram 61-yard punt return (Rian Lindell kick), 5:41 (SEA 14–10)
- SF – José Cortéz 29-yard field goal, 2:09 (SEA 14–13)

**Third quarter**

- SF – Kevan Barlow 6-yard run (José Cortéz kick), 5:29 (SF 20–14)
- SEA – Shaun Alexander 1-yard run (Rian Lindell kick), 1:11 (SEA 21–20)

**Fourth quarter**

- SF – Terrell Owens 37-yard pass from Jeff Garcia (2-pt PAT: Garrison Hearst pass from Jeff Garcia), 7:46 (SF 28–21)

**Top passers**

- SF – Jeff Garcia: 16/29, 202 yds, 2 TD
- SEA – Trent Dilfer: 21/31, 212 yds, 1 TD, 2 INT

**Top rushers**

- SF – Kevan Barlow: 12 car, 68 yds, 1 TD
- SEA – Shaun Alexander: 25 car, 96 yds, 1 TD

**Top receivers**

- SF – Terrell Owens: 6 rec, 84 yds, 2 TD
- SEA – Bobby Engram: 6 rec, 85 yds

**Team** – pass – rush – total – to

- SF – 190 – 161 – 351 – 0
- SEA – 211 – 123 – 334 – 2

==== Week 7: at New Orleans Saints ====
The 4–1 49ers faced the 5–1 Saints for the first time since divisional realignment split the two clubs out of the NFC West and formed the new NFC South. The two clubs put up a combined 840 yards of offense; the Niners led 24–13 after three quarters but the Saints outscored San Francisco 22–3 in the fourth quarter; Jeff Garcia was intercepted with 2:30 to go and Aaron Brooks ran in a one-yard touchdown for the 35–27 Saints win.

==== Week 8: vs. Arizona Cardinals ====
Week 8: Arizona Cardinals (4–2) at San Francisco 49ers (4–2) – Game summary

Quarter	1	2	3	4	Total
Cardinals	0	7	14	7	**28**
**49ers**	17	14	0	7	**38**

at 3Com Park, San Francisco, California

- Date: October 27
- Game time: 1:05 p.m. PST/2:05 p.m. MST
- Game weather: 62 °F (17 °C)
- Game attendance: 67,173
- Referee: Larry Nemmers
- TV announcers (FOX): Kenny Albert, Brian Baldinger
- Box Score

Game information

**First quarter**

- SF – José Cortez 45-yard field goal, 13:12. 49ers 3–0.
- SF – Terrell Owens 21-yard pass from Jeff Garcia (José Cortez kick), 7:19. 49ers 10–0.
- SF – Tai Streets 47-yard pass from Jeff Garcia (José Cortez kick), 4:13. 49ers 17–0.

**Second quarter**

- SF – Kevan Barlow 5-yard run (José Cortez kick), 14:05. 49ers 24–0.
- ARI – Marcel Shipp 7-yard run (Bill Gramática kick), 9:22. 49ers 24–7.
- SF – Terrell Owens 61-yard pass from Jeff Garcia (José Cortez kick), 0:12. 49ers 31–7.

**Third quarter**

- ARI – Jake Plummer 34-yard run (Bill Gramática kick), 11:18. 49ers 31–14.
- ARI – Marcel Shipp 11-yard run (Bill Gramática kick), 3:27. 49ers 31–21.

**Fourth quarter**

- SF – Kevan Barlow 9-yard pass from Jeff Garcia (José Cortez kick), 14:55. 49ers 38–21.
- ARI – Thomas Jones 7-yard run (Bill Gramática kick), 8:23. 49ers 38–28.

**Top passers**

- ARI – Jake Plummer – 24/36, 286 yards, 3 INT
- SF – Jeff Garcia – 18/28, 252 yards, 4 TD

**Top rushers**

- ARI – Thomas Jones – 15 rushes, 54 yards, TD
- SF – Kevan Barlow – 18 rushes, 51 yards, TD

**Top receivers**

- ARI – David Boston – 6 receptions, 83 yards
- SF – Terrell Owens – 8 receptions, 132 yards, 2 TD

**Team** – pass – rush – total – to

- ARI – 286 – 151 – 420 – 4
- SF – 252 – 105 – 357 – 0

Four rushing touchdowns (two of them from Marcel Shipp) were not enough for the Cardinals against the Niners as Jeff Garcia tossed four touchdowns and Jake Plummer was intercepted three times in a 38–28 San Francisco win.

==== Week 9: at Oakland Raiders ====
The two Bay Area teams clashed in an overtime grinder as Rich Gannon threw for 164 yards and a one-yard touchdown to Jerry Porter. Garcia threw for 282 yards and two scores and rushed for 46 yards, 21 of them in overtime following a missed 27-yard Jose Cortez field goal attempt at the end of regulation. Cortez nailed the 23-yard kick in overtime for the 23–20 49ers win.

==== Week 10: vs. Kansas City Chiefs ====
Week 10: Kansas City Chiefs (4–4) at San Francisco 49ers (6–2) – Game summary

Quarter	1	2	3	4	Total
Chiefs	3	7	0	3	**13**
**49ers**	3	14	0	0	**17**

at 3Com Park, San Francisco, California

- Date: November 10
- Game time: 1:15 p.m. PST
- Game weather: Cloudy, 61 °F (16 °C)
- Game attendance: 67,881
- Referee: Ron Blum
- TV announcers (CBS): Greg Gumbel, Phil Simms and Armen Keteyian
- Recap, Game Book

Game information

**First quarter**

- SF – José Cortez 42-yard field goal, 7:06. 49ers 3–0. **Drive: 15 plays, 56 yards, 7:54.**
- KC – Morten Andersen 33-yard field goal, 2:13. Tied 3–3. **Drive: 10 plays, 48 yards, 4:53.**

**Second quarter**

- SF – Garrison Hearst 5-yard run (José Cortez kick), 11:13. 49ers 10–3. **Drive: 11 plays, 71 yards, 6:00.**
- KC – Priest Holmes 12-yard run (Morten Andersen kick), 9:06. Tied 10–10. **Drive: 4 plays, 50 yards, 2:07.**
- SF – Kevan Barlow 6-yard run (José Cortez kick), 2:40. 49ers 17–10. **Drive: 11 plays, 58 yards, 6:26.**

**Third quarter**

- No scoring plays.

**Fourth quarter**

- KC – Morten Andersen 43-yard field goal, 14:21. 49ers 17–13. **Drive: 10 plays, 38 yards, 5:09.**

Top passers

- KC – Trent Green – 15/27, 193 yards
- SF – Jeff Garcia – 25/35, 175 yards, INT

Top rushers

- KC – Priest Holmes – 11 rushes, 51 yards, TD
- SF – Garrison Hearst – 15 rushes, 69 yards, TD

Top receivers

- KC – Eddie Kennison – 8 receptions, 134 yards
- SF – Terrell Owens – 7 receptions, 51 yards

The Niners faced former Rams coach Dick Vermeil, whose Chiefs had scored at least 34 points five times to that point of the season; they were held to 13 points and 256 yards of offense as the Niners ground out the 17–13 win.

==== Week 11: at San Diego Chargers ====
Week 11: San Francisco 49ers (7–2) at San Diego Chargers (6–3) – Game summary

Quarter	1	2	3	4	OT	Total
49ers	0	7	10	0	0	**17**
**Chargers**	7	0	0	10	3	**20**

at Qualcomm Stadium, San Diego, California

- Date: November 17
- Game time: 1:05 p.m. PST
- Game weather: 72 °F (22 °C), relative humidity 54%, wind 9 mph
- Game attendance: 67,161
- Referee: Mike Carey
- TV announcers (Fox): Joe Buck, Cris Collinsworth and Troy Aikman
- Box score, Game Book

Game information

**First quarter**

- SDG – Reche Caldwell 4-yard pass from Drew Brees (Steve Christie kick), 0:40. Chargers 7–0. **Drive: 10 plays, 80 yards, 4:40.**

**Second quarter**

- SF – Terrell Owens 32-yard pass from Jeff Garcia (Jose Cortez kick), 1:04. Tied 7–7. **Drive: 5 plays, 69 yards, 1:32.**

**Third quarter**

- SF – Terrell Owens 76-yard pass from Jeff Garcia (Jose Cortez kick), 14:06. 49ers 14–7. **Drive: 3 plays, 80 yards, 0:54.**
- SF – Jose Cortez 24-yard field goal, 6:38. 49ers 17–7. **Drive: 11 plays, 41 yards, 5:20.**

**Fourth quarter**

- SDG – Steve Christie 36-yard field goal, 5:05. 49ers 17–10. **Drive: 7 plays, 62 yards, 2:33.**
- SDG – Fred McCrary 1-yard pass from Drew Brees (Steve Christie kick), 0:31. Tied 17–17. **Drive: 11 plays, 58 yards, 2:51.**

**Overtime**

- SDG – Steve Christie 40-yard field goal, 4:11. Chargers 20–17. **Drive: 9 plays, 47 yards, 4:35.**

**Top passers**

- SF – Jeff Garcia – 25/43, 337 yards, 2 TD, INT
- SDG – Drew Brees – 29/50, 336 yards, 2 TD, INT

**Top rushers**

- SF – Garrison Hearst – 12 rushes, 66 yards
- SDG – LaDainian Tomlinson – 24 rushes, 88 yards

**Top receivers**

- SF – Terrell Owens – 7 receptions, 171 yards, 2 TD
- SDG – Curtis Conway – 7 receptions, 152 yards

At San Diego Terrell Owens caught two touchdowns, one a 76-yard bomb, but the Niners blew a 17–7 lead to the Chargers as Drew Brees' touchdown to Fred McCrary with 31 seconds to go tied the game, and former Buffalo Bill Steve Christie won it with 4:11 to go in overtime on a 40-yard field goal. The two teams combined for 908 yards of offense. Kicker Jose Cortez, who missed another game-winning field goal attempt in overtime, was cut by the 49ers.

==== Week 12: vs. Philadelphia Eagles ====
Despite putting up 409 yards of offense the Niners were pounded by the Eagles 38–17 as Koy Detmer and A. J. Feeley combined for three touchdown throws; Detmer added a rushing score and Brian Mitchell ran back a 76-yard punt for a touchdown. Future Eagle Terrell Owens caught two touchdown passes from Jeff Garcia. |Weather= 68 °F (20 °C) (Clear)

==== Week 13: vs. Seattle Seahawks ====
Week 13: Seattle Seahawks (4–7) at San Francisco 49ers (7–4) – Game summary

Quarter	1	2	3	4	Total
Seahawks	0	3	7	14	**24**
**49ers**	0	17	7	7	**31**

at 3Com Park, San Francisco

- Date: December 1
- Game time: 1:15pm local
- Game weather: clear, 58 °F (14 °C), 14% humidity, wind variable
- Game attendance: 67,594
- Referee: Tom White
- TV announcers (Fox): Pat Summerall, Brian Baldinger, Brian Webber
- Gamecenter, Gamebook

Game information

**First quarter**

- No scoring plays

**Second quarter**

- SEA – Rian Lindell 20-yard field goal, 14:31 (SEA 3–0)
- SF – Garrison Hearst 5-yard run (Jeff Chandler kick), 5:45 (SF 7–3)
- SF – Jimmy Williams 89-yard punt return (Jeff Chandler kick), 2:48 (SF 14–3)
- SF – Jeff Chandler 23-yard field goal, 0:20 (SF 17–3)

**Third quarter**

- SF – Garrison Hearst 1-yard run (Jeff Chandler kick), 10:12 (SF 24–3)
- SEA – Darrell Jackson 36-yard pass from Matt Hasselbeck (Rian Lindell kick), 8:52 (SF 24–10)

**Fourth quarter**

- SF – Garrison Hearst 1-yard run (Jeff Chandler kick), 13:25 (SF 31–10)
- SEA – Koren Robinson 15-yard pass from Matt Hasselbeck (Rian Lindell kick), 3:50 (SF 31–17)
- SEA – Darrell Jackson 3-yard pass from Matt Hasselbeck (Rian Lindell kick), 1:57 (SF 31–24)

**Top passers**

- SEA – Matt Hasselbeck: 30/55, 427 yds, 3 TD, 2 INT
- SF – Jeff Garcia: 16/29, 164 yds, 2 INT

**Top rushers**

- SEA – Shaun Alexander: 16 car, 74 yds
- SF – Garrison Hearst: 31 car, 124 yds, 3 TD

**Top receivers**

- SEA – Darrell Jackson: 7 rec, 114 yds, 2 TD
- SF – Tai Streets: 6 rec, 66 yds

**Team** – pass – rush – total – to

- SEA – 427 – 80 – 507 – 3
- SF – 157 – 142 – 299 – 2

The Niners raced to a 31–10 lead behind three Garrison Hearst touchdown runs and a punt return score. In the fourth quarter Matt Hasselbeck (who had 427 passing yards in all) scored twice on passes to Koren Robinson and Darrell Jackson but was intercepted with 1:31 to go, ensuring the 31–24 Niners win.

==== Week 14: at Dallas Cowboys ====
Though the championship rivalry of a decade past had cooled off with the fall of the Cowboys to sub-mediocrity, the game at Texas Stadium nonetheless resembled Cowboy-49er clashes of yore. Despite intercepting Chad Hutchinson twice, the 49ers saw the lead change four times before the Cowboys surged to a 27–17 lead in the fourth quarter. Jeff Garcia then stormed the 49ers to the win on touchdowns to Tai Streets and a bobbling eight-yard catch by Terrell Owens with fifteen seconds remaining. In the 31–27 49ers win the two teams combined for 35 fourth-quarter points.

==== Week 15: vs. Green Bay Packers ====
Week 15: Green Bay Packers at San Francisco 49ers

Quarter	1	2	3	4	Total
**Packers**	3	0	14	3	**20**
49ers	0	6	8	0	**14**

at 3Com Park, San Francisco, California

- Date: December 15, 2002
- Game time: 4:15 p.m.
- Game weather: Light Rain, 58 °F (14 °C)
- Game attendance: 67,947
- Referee: Tony Corrente (99)
- TV announcers (FOX): Joe Buck, Troy Aikman, Cris Collinsworth & Pam Oliver
- Recap, Game Book

Game information

**First quarter**

- GB – Ryan Longwell 48-yard field goao, 2:12. Packers 3–0. **Drive: 10 plays, 16 yards, 4:37.**

**Second quarter**

- SF – Jeff Chandler 47-yard field goal, 9:34. Tied 3–3. **Drive: 5 plays, 23 yards, 1:46.**
- SF – Jeff Chandler 42-yard field goal, 0:07. 49ers 6–3. **Drive: 13 plays, 44 yards, 3:52.**

**Third quarter**

- GB – Ahman Green 9-yard run (Ryan Longwell kick), 11:02. Packers 10–6. **Drive: 9 plays, 79 yards, 3:58.**
- GB – Donald Driver 5-yard pass from Brett Favre (Ryan Longwell kick), 5:35. Packers 17–6. **Drive: 6 plays, 29 yards, 3:19.**
- SF – Terrell Owens 45-yard pass from Jeff Garcia (Jeff Garcia run), 1:04. Packers 17–14. **Drive: 8 plays, 73 yards, 4:31.**

**Fourth quarter**

- GB – Ryan Longwell 28-yard field goal, 4:41. Packers 20–14. **Drive: 11 plays, 53 yards, 4:59.**

**Top passers**

- GB – Brett Favre – 25/33, 201 yards, TD
- SF – Jeff Garcia – 19/34, 156 yards, TD, INT

**Top rushers**

- GB – Ahman Green – 24 rushes, 90 yards, TD
- SF – Garrison Hearst – 12 rushes, 51 yards

**Top receivers**

- GB – Terry Glenn – 3 receptions, 46 yards
- SF – Terrell Owens – 8 receptions, 75 yards, TD

The Niners’ perennial struggles against the Packers since Green Bay's 1995 playoff win continued with San Francisco's tenth loss in eleven meetings. Terrell Owens caught a pass and bulled off a defender into the end zone; after scoring he took the pom poms of a Niners cheerleader and celebrated. On the Niners final drive Garcia drove to the Packers 14 (gaining a first down on a run and despite running into a Packers assistant coach on the sideline) but was stopped on fourth down.

==== Week 16: at Arizona Cardinals ====
The Niners held the Cardinals to just 184 yards of offense in a 17–14 Niners win. Terrell Owens did not play. Regardless, the 49ers clinched the NFC West with the win. This would be their last NFC West title until 2011.

==== Week 17: at St. Louis Rams ====
Having clinched the NFC West, the Niners rested many starters against the Rams as Jeff Garcia threw only three passes and Tim Rattay threw a pair of touchdowns to Tai Streets. The Rams played to salvage a win in their disappointing season and exploded for 28 fourth-quarter points to win 31–20; the Rams thus finished 7–9 while the Niners were 10–6.

=== Standings ===
==== Division ====
NFC West
	W	L	T	PCT	DIV	CONF	PF	PA	STK
^{(4)} San Francisco 49ers	10	6	0	.625	5–1	8–4	367	351	L1
St. Louis Rams	7	9	0	.438	4–2	5–7	316	369	W1
Seattle Seahawks	7	9	0	.438	2–4	5–7	355	369	W3
Arizona Cardinals	5	11	0	.313	1–5	5–7	262	417	L3

==== Conference ====
NFC
#	Team	Division	W	L	T	PCT	DIV	CONF	SOS	SOV
**Division leaders**
1 (Note: Philadelphia finished ahead of Tampa Bay and Green Bay based on conference record (11–1 vs 9–3/9–3).)	Philadelphia Eagles	East	12	4	0	.750	5–1	11–1	.469	.432
2 (Note: Tampa Bay finished ahead of Green Bay based on head-to-head victory.)	Tampa Bay Buccaneers	South	12	4	0	.750	4–2	9–3	.482	.432
3	Green Bay Packers	North	12	4	0	.750	5–1	9–3	.451	.414
4	San Francisco 49ers	West	10	6	0	.625	5–1	8–4	.504	.450
**Wild Cards**
5	New York Giants	East	10	6	0	.625	5–1	8–4	.482	.450
6	Atlanta Falcons	South	9	6	1	.594	4–2	7–5	.494	.429
**Did not qualify for the postseason**
7	New Orleans Saints	South	9	7	0	.563	3–3	7–5	.498	.566
8 (Note: St. Louis finished ahead of Seattle based on division record (4–2 to 2–4).)	St. Louis Rams	West	7	9	0	.438	4–2	5–7	.508	.446
9	Seattle Seahawks	West	7	9	0	.438	2–4	5–7	.506	.433
10 (Note: Washington finished ahead of Carolina based on common games (2–3 to 1–4))	Washington Redskins	East	7	9	0	.438	1–5	4–8	.527	.438
11	Carolina Panthers	South	7	9	0	.438	1–5	4–8	.486	.357
12	Minnesota Vikings	North	6	10	0	.375	4–2	5–7	.498	.417
13 (Note: Arizona finished ahead of Dallas based on head-to-head victory.)	Arizona Cardinals	West	5	11	0	.313	1–5	5–7	.500	.400
14	Dallas Cowboys	East	5	11	0	.313	1–5	3–9	.500	.475
15	Chicago Bears	North	4	12	0	.250	2–4	3–9	.521	.430
16	Detroit Lions	North	3	13	0	.188	1–5	3–9	.494	.375
**Tiebreakers** (Note: When breaking ties for three or more teams under the NFL's rules, they are first broken within divisions, then comparing only the highest-ranked remaining team from each division.)

== Playoffs ==
=== Schedule ===
Round	Date	Opponent (seed)	Result	Record	Venue	NFL.com recap
Wild Card	January 5, 2003	New York Giants (5)	W 39–38	1–0	3Com Park	Recap
Divisional	January 12, 2003	at Tampa Bay Buccaneers (2)	L 6–31	1–1	Raymond James Stadium	Recap

=== Game summaries ===
==== NFC Wild Card Playoffs: vs. New York Giants ====
NFC Wild Card Playoffs: (#5) New York Giants at (#4) San Francisco 49ers

Quarter	1	2	3	4	Total
Giants	7	21	10	0	38
49ers	7	7	8	17	39

at 3Com Park, San Francisco, California

- Date: January 5, 2003
- Game time: 4:30 p.m. EST
- Game weather: 53 °F (12 °C), sunny
- Game attendance: 66,318
- Referee: Ron Winter
- TV: FOX
- Recap

Game information

First quarter

- SF – Terrell Owens 76 yard pass from Jeff Garcia (Jeff Chandler kick), 10:10. 49ers 7–0. Drive: 1 play, 76 yards, 0:11.
- NYG – Amani Toomer 12 yard pass from Kerry Collins (Matt Bryant kick), 0:22. Tied 7–7. Drive: 11 plays, 55 yards, 4:15.

Second quarter

- NYG – Jeremy Shockey 2 yard pass from Kerry Collins (Matt Bryant kick), 12:24. Giants 14–7. Drive: 5 plays, 61 yards, 2:24.
- SF – Kevan Barlow 1 yard run (Jeff Chandler kick), 6:58. Tied 14–14. Drive: 10 plays, 69 yards, 6:14.
- NYG – Amani Toomer 8 yard pass from Kerry Collins (Matt Bryant kick), 2:54. Giants 21–14. Drive: 1 play, 8 yards, 0:05.
- NYG – Amani Toomer 24 yard pass from Kerry Collins (Matt Bryant kick), 0:16. Giants 28–14. Drive: 5 plays, 66 yards, 1:43.

Third quarter

- NYG – Tiki Barber 6 yard run (Matt Bryant kick), 9:57. Giants 35–14. Drive: 6 plays, 54 yards, 2:16.
- NYG – Matt Bryant 21 yard field goal, 4:30. Giants 38–14. Drive: 9 plays, 63 yards, 4:20.
- SF – Terrell Owens 26 yard pass from Jeff Garcia (Jeff Garcia–Terrell Owens pass), 2:10. Giants 38–22. Drive: 7 plays, 70 yards, 2:24.

Fourth quarter

- SF – Jeff Garcia 14 yard run (Jeff Garcia–Terrell Owens pass), 15:00. Giants 38–30. Drive: 3 plays, 27 yards, 0:41.
- SF – Jeff Chandler 25 yard field goal, 7:52. Giants 38–33. Drive: 15 plays, 74 yards, 5:26.
- SF – Tai Streets 13 yard pass from Jeff Garcia (pass failed), 1:05. 49ers 39–38. Drive: 9 plays, 68 yards, 2:01.

The Steelers' comeback earlier in the day (36–33 over the Cleveland Browns) was matched by San Francisco's similar late drive, overcoming a 38–14 deficit by scoring 25 unanswered points in the second half. A last-minute Giants drive collapsed when Trey Junkin botched a field goal snap, leading to a desperation heave to the endzone that fell short. There were two notable events in this game. The first one was when after the 49ers scored a touchdown, Terrell Owens caught a pass from Jeff Garcia for the two-point conversion. After the catch, Owens did a little showboating. Michael Strahan of the Giants went up to Owens and pointed to the scoreboard and mocked Owens. (At the time, the Giants led 38–22.) This is significant because the 49ers came back to win. After the 49ers scored another touchdown and made the score 38–30, Joe Buck remarked "The scoreboard doesn't look so great to Strahan anymore." The second event in the game was that in the 3rd quarter, Jeremy Shockey dropped a touchdown pass that would have put the Giants up 41–14. Instead, the Giants had to kick a field goal, making the score 38–14. Nobody at the time knew how big of a mistake this dropped pass would be for the Giants, and how big of a blessing for the 49ers. The win was the 26th in a playoff game for the club and the last until the 2011 divisional playoffs. The 49ers 25-point comeback led them to the Divisional Round but lost to the eventual Super Bowl champion Buccanners 31-6.

==== NFC Divisional Playoffs: at Tampa Bay Buccaneers – January 12, 2003 ====
NFC Divisional Playoffs: (#4) San Francisco 49ers at (#2) Tampa Bay Buccaneers

Quarter	1	2	3	4	Total
49ers	3	3	0	0	6
Buccaneers	7	21	3	0	31

at Raymond James Stadium, Tampa, Florida

- Date: January 12, 2003
- Game time: 1:00 p.m. EST
- Game weather: 54 °F (12 °C), partly cloudy
- Game attendance: 65,599
- Referee: Gerald Austin
- TV: FOX
- Recap

Game information

First quarter

- TB – Mike Alstott 2 yard run (Martín Gramática kick), 6:41. Buccaneers 7–0. Drive: 12 plays, 64 yards, 5:16.
- SF – Jeff Chandler 24 yard field goal, 0:22. Buccaneers 7–3. Drive: 12 plays, 63 yards, 6:17.

Second quarter

- TB – Joe Jurevicius 20 yard pass from Brad Johnson (Martín Gramática kick), 9:35. Buccaneers 14–3. Drive: 11 plays, 87 yards, 5:50.
- SF – Jeff Chandler 40 yard field goal, 8:36. Buccaneers 14–6. Drive: 5 plays, 9 yards, 0:46.
- TB – Rickey Dudley 12 yard pass from Brad Johnson (Martín Gramática kick), 7:31. Buccaneers 21–6. Drive: 2 plays, 16 yards, 1:07.
- TB – Mike Alstott 2 yard run (Martín Gramática kick), 0:55. Buccaneers 28–6. Drive: 4 plays, 26 yards, 1:10.

Third quarter

- TB – Martín Gramática 19 yard field goal, 8:33. Buccaneers 31–6. Drive: 10 plays, 36 yards, 6:16.

Fourth quarter

- No scoring plays.

The Buccaneers, with the league's top-ranked defense during the 2002 regular season, forced five turnovers, sacked quarterback Jeff Garcia four times, and limited the 49ers to only two field goals. Tampa Bay quarterback Brad Johnson, who had been sidelined for a month, returned to throw for 196 yards and two touchdowns. Fullback Mike Alstott scored two touchdowns, while the Buccaneers held onto the ball for 36:46 and held the 49ers to a season low 228 yards. This was San Francisco's first playoff game without a touchdown since 1986. Despite San Francisco's 10–6 record and their Wild Card playoff win against New York, coach Steve Mariucci was fired three days after this game. This would be the 49ers last playoff appearance until 2011 and their last loss in the Divisional Round loss until 2025.
