= 2001 San Francisco 49ers season =

American football team season

- Owner: Denise DeBartolo York and John York
- General manager: Terry Donahue
- Head coach: Steve Mariucci
- Offensive coordinator: Greg Knapp
- Defensive coordinator: Jim L. Mora
- Home stadium: 3Com Park

Results
- Record: 12–4
- Division place: 2nd NFC West
- Playoffs: Lost Wild Card Playoffs (at Packers) 15–25
- All-Pros: Terrell Owens (1st team); Ray Brown (2nd team); Bryant Young (2nd team)
- Pro Bowlers: C Jeremy Newberry; G Ray Brown; QB Jeff Garcia; WR Terrell Owens; RB Garrison Hearst; DT Bryant Young

Uniform
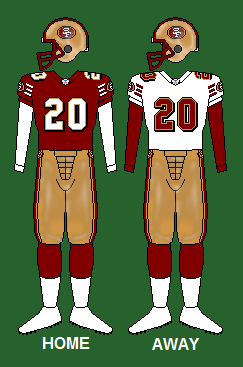

The 2001 San Francisco 49ers season was the franchise's 56th season and 52nd in the National Football League (NFL). The 49ers rebounded from two losing seasons in 1999 and 2000, achieving their first winning season under quarterback Jeff Garcia and returning to the playoffs for the first time since 1998 behind a strong 12–4 record. However, the 49ers failed to progress further, falling 25–15 to the Green Bay Packers in the wild-card round. This was the fourth time out of five games that they had lost to the Packers in the playoffs since the 1995 season. However, they have won all five meetings since then. To date, this is also the last season where the 49ers have failed to make it past the wild card round in the post-season. For the first time since 1984, Jerry Rice was not on the opening day roster.

The 49ers' twelve regular-season wins were the most ever for a #5 seed under the 1990 playoff expansion format; the win count would later be surpassed by the 2024 Minnesota Vikings, who finished with fourteen wins also as a #5 seed since the 2020 playoff bracket expansion. Their three overtime wins tied the NFL record at the time, which has since been surpassed by the 2011 Arizona Cardinals and 2021 Las Vegas Raiders.

== Offseason ==
Additions	Subtractions
LB Derek Smith (Redskins)	WR Jerry Rice (Raiders)
LB Terry Killens (Titans)	RB Charlie Garner (Raiders)
	LB Ken Norton Jr. (retirement)
	RB Travis Jervey (Falcons)
	DT Brentson Buckner (Panthers)
	DE Anthony Pleasant (Patriots)
	LB Artie Ulmer (Falcons)

=== NFL draft ===
2001 San Francisco 49ers draft
Round	Pick	Player	Position	College	Notes
1	7	Andre Carter *	Defensive end	California	
2	47	Jamie Winborn	Linebacker	Vanderbilt	
3	80	Kevan Barlow	Running back	Pittsburgh	
6	169	Cedrick Wilson	Wide receiver	Tennessee	
6	179	Rashad Holman	Cornerback	Louisville	
6	191	Menson Holloway	Defensive end	UTEP	
7	209	Alex Lincoln	Linebacker	Auburn	
7	224	Eric Johnson	Tight end	Yale	
Made roster * Made at least one Pro Bowl during career

=== Undrafted free agents ===
2001 undrafted free agents of note
Player	Position	College
Hilton Alexander	Wide receiver	Morris Brown
David Allen	Running back	Kansas State
Tom Ashworth	Tackle	Colorado
Al Blades	Safety	Miami (FL)
Wes Call	Tackle	Washington
Antonio Chatman	Wide receiver	Cincinnati
Stephen Cheek	Punter	Humboldt State
Dave Costa	Guard	Wisconsin
Larry Davis	Wide receiver	New Mexico
Shane Elam	Linebacker	Ole Miss
Jimmy Farris	Wide receiver	Montana
Brandon Godsey	Cornerback	Miami (OH)
Moses Harper	Defensive tackle	Lambuth
Shawn Hay	Defensive end	South Florida
Grant Heard	Wide receiver	Ole Miss
Jasen Isom	Fullback	Western Illinois
James Jordan	Wide receiver	Louisiana Tech
Jeff McCurley	Center	Pittsburgh
Jamie Rheem	Kicker	Kansas State
John Schlecht	Defensive tackle	Minnesota
Brian Smith	Safety	UMass
Ben Steele	Tight end	Mesa State
Milford Stephenson	Tackle	Kansas State
Quincy Stewart	Linebacker	Louisiana Tech
Keith Stokes	Wide receiver	East Carolina
Bruce Wiggins	Center	Arizona

== Staff ==
2001 San Francisco 49ers staff
Front office: Owner – Denise DeBartolo York; Owner – The DeBartolo Corporation; Director/owner's representative – John York; President/chief executive officer – Peter L. Harris; General manager – Terry Donahue; Vice president/director of football operations – John McVay; Consultant – Bill Walsh; Director of pro personnel – Bill McPherson; Head coaches: Head coach – Steve Mariucci; Offensive coaches: Offensive coordinator – Greg Knapp; Quarterbacks – Greg Olson; Running backs – Tom Rathman; Wide receivers – George Stewart; Tight ends – Tom Batta; Offensive line – Pat Morris; Offensive assistant – Andy Sugarman; Offensive quality control – Jason Tarver	Defensive coaches: Defensive coordinator – Jim Mora Jr; Defensive line – Dwaine Board; Linebackers – Richard Smith; Assistant secondary – Brett Maxie; Defensive assistant – Chris Beake; Defensive quality control – Dan Quinn; Special teams coaches: Special teams – Bruce DeHaven; Strength and conditioning: Physical development coordinator – Jerry Attaway; Strength development coordinator – Terrell Jones; Intern athletic trainer – Manny Rivera

== Roster ==
2001 San Francisco 49ers roster
Quarterbacks (QB): 5 Jeff Garcia; 3 Rick Mirer; 13 Tim Rattay; Running backs (RB): 32 Kevan Barlow; 40 Fred Beasley FB; 20 Garrison Hearst; 22 Terry Jackson; 27 Paul Smith FB; Wide receivers (WR): 81 Terrell Owens; 83 J.J. Stokes; 89 Tai Streets; 14 Vinny Sutherland; 84 Cedrick Wilson; Tight ends (TE): 85 Greg Clark; 82 Eric Johnson; 88 Justin Swift	Offensive linemen (OL): 65 Ray Brown G; 76 Dave Costa T; 63 Derrick Deese T; 74 Dave Fiore G; 78 Scott Gragg T; 60 Ben Lynch C; 62 Jeremy Newberry C; 68 Chad Ward G; 77 Matt Willig T; Defensive linemen (DL): 96 Andre Carter DE; 95 John Engelberger DE; 99 Menson Holloway DE; 92 Reggie McGrew DT; 91 Chike Okeafor DE; 93 John Schlecht DT; 90 Bobby Setzer DE; 94 Dana Stubblefield DT; 97 Bryant Young DT	Linebackers (LB): 56 Terry Killens OLB; 98 Julian Peterson OLB; 50 Derek Smith MLB; 54 Quincy Stewart OLB; 53 Jeff Ulbrich OLB; 55 Jamie Winborn MLB; Defensive backs (DB): 31 Zack Bronson FS; 33 Tyronne Drakeford CB; 38 Ronnie Heard SS; 26 Rashad Holman CB; 24 George McCullough CB; 21 Anthony Parker CB; 29 Ahmed Plummer CB; 30 Lance Schulters SS; 36 Jason Webster CB; 23 Jimmy Williams CB; Special teams (ST): 7 Jason Baker P; 6 José Cortez K; 86 Brian Jennings LS	Practice squad: 45 Al Blades S; 15 Jimmy Farris WR; 66 Jon Feugill T; 46 Ben Steele TE; 64 Milford Stephenson T; Reserve: 19 Giovanni Carmazzi QB (PUP); 28 John Keith S (IR); 43 Jonas Lewis RB (IR); -- Alex Lincoln LB (NF-Inj.); Rookies in italics 53 active, 4 reserve, 5 practice squad

== Preseason ==
Week	Date	Opponent	Result	Record	Venue
1	August 11	at San Diego Chargers	L 24–25	0–1	Qualcomm Stadium
2	August 19	Oakland Raiders	W 20–17	1–1	3Com Park
3	August 25	Seattle Seahawks	L 18–28	1–2	3Com Park
4	August 31	at Denver Broncos	L 7–35	1–3	Invesco Field at Mile High

== Regular season ==
=== Schedule ===
Week	Date	Opponent	Result	Record	Venue	Attendance
1	September 9	**Atlanta Falcons**	**W** 16–13 (OT)	1–0	3Com Park	65,989
2 (Note: The 49ers were originally scheduled to play the New Orleans Saints during Week 2 of the original NFL schedule (September 16) at Louisiana Superdome in New Orleans. However, due to the September 11 attacks, the game was rescheduled to Week 17.)	September 23	**St. Louis Rams**	**L** 26–30	1–1	3Com Park	67,536
3	October 1	at New York Jets	**W** 19–17	2–1	Giants Stadium	78,722
4	October 7	**Carolina Panthers**	**W** 24–14	3–1	3Com Park	66,944
5	October 14	at **Atlanta Falcons**	**W** 37–31 (OT)	4–1	Georgia Dome	46,727
6	Bye					
7	October 28	at Chicago Bears	**L** 31–37 (OT)	4–2	Soldier Field	66,944
8	November 4	Detroit Lions	**W** 21–13	5–2	3Com Park	67,605
9	November 11	**New Orleans Saints**	**W** 28–27	6–2	3Com Park	68,063
10	November 18	at **Carolina Panthers**	**W** 25–22 (OT)	7–2	Ericcson Stadium	72,665
11	November 25	at Indianapolis Colts	**W** 40–21	8–2	RCA Dome	56,393
12	December 2	Buffalo Bills	**W** 35–0	9–2	3Com Park	67,252
13	December 9	at **St. Louis Rams**	**L** 14–27	9–3	Trans World Dome	66,218
14	December 16	Miami Dolphins	**W** 21–0	10–3	3Com Park	68,223
15	December 22	Philadelphia Eagles	**W** 13–3	11–3	3Com Park	68,124
16	December 30	at Dallas Cowboys	**L** 21–27	11–4	Texas Stadium	64,366
17	January 6	at **New Orleans Saints**	**W** 38–0	12–4	Louisiana Superdome	70,020
Note: Intra-division opponents are in **bold** text.

=== Game summaries ===
- Week One vs. Atlanta Falcons – Despite limiting the Falcons to 241 total yards the Niners had to rally from down 13–3 in the second half. J.J. Stokes caught a touchdown from Jeff Garcia early in the fourth and Jose Cortez' 20-yard field goal forced overtime, where he won it from 24 yards out. Rookie Michael Vick of the Falcons attempted four passes, none completed.
- Week Two vs. St. Louis Rams – The Rams raced to a 12–0 lead (marred by a botched two-point conversion attempt) before giving up 16 unanswered points to the Niners (marred by a missed PAT) to end the first half. The Rams behind Kurt Warner then outscored Jeff Garcia's Niners 18–10 in the second half, winning by a 30–26 final as they held the Niners to 232 yards of offense.
- Week Three at NY Jets – Three years after Garrison Hearst's 96-yard overtime touchdown, the 49ers faced the New York Jets again, this time grinding out a 19–17 win. Hearst had 83 yards as the Niners rushed for 233 yards vs. 82 for the Jets, 76 of them (and a touchdown) from Curtis Martin.
- Week Four vs. Carolina Panthers – The Panthers had won four straight against the 49ers and eight of the two clubs' first thirteen meetings, but with rookie washout Chris Weinke the Panthers fell 24–14; the Niners picked off Weinke three times while Jeff Garcia had 212 passing yards and two touchdowns to Terrell Owens; five Niners backs also rushed for 150 yards.
- Week Five at Atlanta Falcons – After being held without a catch for the entire first half Terrell Owens erupted to nine catches for 183 yards and three touchdowns, the last a 52-yard bomb in overtime, as the Niners battled from behind the entire game. Chris Chandler of the Falcons had two touchdowns, the last a 47-yarder to Brian Finneran with 2:22 to go in the fourth.
- Week six – BYE WEEK
- Week Seven at Chicago Bears – The Niners had beaten the Bears five straight meetings entering this encounter, but this game proved difficult for San Francisco after the Niners raced to a 28–9 lead in the third quarter. The Bears exploded to three touchdowns, two of them David Terrell catches from Shane Matthews that forced overtime tied 31–31. Six seconds into overtime Jeff Garcia's pass to Terrell Owens bounced out of his hands and was intercepted by Mike Brown, who ran back a 33-yard touchdown; it was the first of a series of consecutive overtime scores by Brown as the Bears won 37–31.
- Week Eight vs. Detroit Lions – With Ed Hochuli as head referee, the Niners welcomed their former linebacker Matt Millen, now the ill-fated front office executive of the Lions, by beating his present team 21–13. Robert Bailey picked off Jeff Garcia and ran back a 74-yard touchdown, but after taking a 10–0 lead the Lions were crushed by three Garcia touchdowns, including two to Terrell Owens, as three Detroit passers failed to surpass 90 total yards.
- Week Nine vs. New Orleans Saints – The Niners hosted the Saints for what proved to be the final time as NFC West division foes and edged the defending division champs 28–27. Two touchdowns to Terrell Owens put the Niners up but late in the third Joe Horn's catch from Aaron Brooks put the Saints ahead 24–21. Jeff Garcia found Eric Johnson early in the fourth and the Saints could get no closer than 28–27 in the fourth.
- Week Ten at Carolina Panthers – The Niners had to put up 417 yards of offense to erase a 22–14 Panthers lead and win 25–22. The Niners needed the final play of regulation to tie the game on a seven-yard Terrell Owens catch and Eric Johnson catch for the two-point conversion. In overtime the Niners needed eight plays before Jose Cortez finished the game off from 26 yards out.
- Week Eleven at Indianapolis Colts – Despite trailing 21–20 and being outgained 340 yards of offense to 491 for the Colts, the 49ers crushed Indianapolis 40–21 by picking off Peyton Manning four times; Zack Bronson ran back one pick for a 48-yard touchdown. The Colts thus had lost for the third straight time and the frustration spilled into an infamous post-game press conference meltdown by Colts coach Jim E. Mora.
- Week Twelve vs. Buffalo Bills – For the second time in the season Ed Hochuli was the head referee in a 49ers game at The Stick and the Niners made it an easy game for Hochuli by crushing the Bills 35–0. Hochuli flagged the Bills for seven penalties versus just one for the 49ers, who put up 409 yards of offense vs. 191 for Buffalo. Garrison Hearst rushed for 124 yards.
- Week Thirteen at St. Louis Rams – In defeating the 49ers 27–14, Kurt Warner ended the Niners' quest for the division title with 294 yards and two touchdowns, outclassing Jeff Garcia's 146 yards with 26 incompletions; Ricky Proehl's 109 receiving yards nearly outgained the pass-catching yardage of the entire Niners receiving corps.
- Week Fourteen vs. Miami Dolphins – The Dolphins put up 174 yards of offense while the Niners had 152 yards rushing en route to a 21–0 shutout win. Jay Fiedler was intercepted three times while Jeff Garcia had a touchdown to Eric Johnson.
- Week Fifteen vs. Philadelphia Eagles – The Niners played their last home game of the year by edging the Eagles 13–3. The two teams combined for just 536 yards of offense (with 109 yards of penalties to the Eagles) as Terrell Owens had the game's only touchdown, a 32-yard catch. |Weather= 55 °F or 12.8 °C (Partly Cloudy)
- Week Sixteen at Dallas Cowboys – A year after the infamous confrontation between Terrell Owens and the Cowboys at Texas Stadium's 50-yard line, the Cowboys won 27–21 behind three total touchdowns, 241 passing yards, and 30 rushing yards from Quincy Carter. Emmitt Smith exploded to 126 rushing yards.
- Week Seventeen at New Orleans Saints – The 49ers crushed the Saints 38–0 as they intercepted Aaron Brooks four times, forced two fumbles, and Jeff Garcia threw four touchdowns, two of them 50-plus yarders to Terrell Owens. The Saints were held to 126 total yards of offense in their final game as an NFC West team.

=== Standings ===
NFC West
	W	L	T	PCT	PF	PA	STK
^{(1)} St. Louis Rams	14	2	0	.875	503	273	W6
^{(5)} San Francisco 49ers	12	4	0	.750	409	282	W1
New Orleans Saints	7	9	0	.438	333	409	L4
Atlanta Falcons	7	9	0	.438	291	377	L2
Carolina Panthers	1	15	0	.063	253	410	L15

== Playoffs ==
Round	Date	Opponent	Result	Record	Venue
Wild Card	January 13, 2002	at Green Bay Packers (4)	L 15–25	0–1	Lambeau Field

=== NFC Wild Card at Green Bay Packers ===
NFC Wild Card: San Francisco 49ers at Green Bay Packers – Game summary

Quarter	1	2	3	4	Total
49ers	0	7	0	8	15
Packers	6	0	9	10	25

at Lambeau Field, Green Bay, Wisconsin

- Date: January 13, 2002
- Game time: 11:30 a.m.
- Game weather: 26 °F or −3.3 °C, relative humidity 77%, wind 10 miles per hour (16 km/h; 8.7 kn), wind chill 17 °F or −8.3 °C
- TV: FOX Announcers: Pat Summerall, John Madden, and Ron Pitts
- Scoring
  - GB – Freeman 5 pass from Favre (kick blocked) GB 6–0
  - SF – Hearst 2 run (Cortez kick) SF 7–6
  - GB – field goal Longwell 26 GB 9–7
  - GB – Franks 19 pass from Favre (Two-point conversion failed) GB 15–7
  - SF – Streets 19 pass from Garcia (Streets pass from Garcia) Tie 15–15
  - GB – field goal Longwell 45 GB 18–15
  - GB – Green 9 run (Longwell kick) GB 25–15

== Awards ==
- Garrison Hearst won NFL Comeback Player of the Year Award
