= 2004 San Francisco 49ers season =

American football team season

- Owner: Denise DeBartolo York and John York
- General manager: Terry Donahue
- Head coach: Dennis Erickson
- Home stadium: Monster Park

Results
- Record: 2–14
- Division place: 4th NFC West
- Playoffs: Did not qualify
- Pro Bowlers: LS Brian Jennings

Uniform
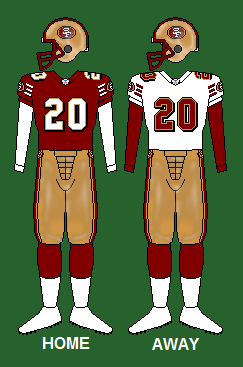

The 2004 season was the San Francisco 49ers' 55th in the National Football League (NFL), the 59th overall and their second and final under head coach Dennis Erickson, as he was fired after the season.

The 49ers attempted to improve on their 7–9 output from the previous season, but the 49ers finished the season at 2–14, both wins coming against division-rival Arizona Cardinals in overtime by the same score. The 49ers earned the #1 overall pick in the 2005 NFL draft, where they selected quarterback Alex Smith, who would play for the team for eight seasons.

The season marked changes for the 49ers, who lost three key members of the 2003 team. Quarterback Jeff Garcia was released in the off-season and later signed with the Cleveland Browns, running back Garrison Hearst went to the Denver Broncos, and controversial wide receiver Terrell Owens went to the Philadelphia Eagles, where they lost to the New England Patriots in the Super Bowl.

== Offseason ==
=== NFL draft ===
2004 San Francisco 49ers draft
Round	Pick	Player	Position	College	Notes
1	31	Rashaun Woods	Wide receiver	Oklahoma State	
2	46	Justin Smiley	Guard	Alabama	
2	58	Shawntae Spencer	Cornerback	Pittsburgh	
3	77	Derrick Hamilton	Wide receiver	Clemson	
4	104	Isaac Sopoaga	Defensive tackle	Hawaii	
4	127	Richard Seigler	Linebacker	Oregon State	
6	188	Andy Lee *	Punter	Pittsburgh	
6	198	Keith Lewis	Safety	Oregon	
7	217	Cody Pickett	Quarterback	Washington	
7	226	Christian Ferrara	Defensive tackle	Syracuse	
Made roster * Made at least one Pro Bowl during career

== Roster ==
2004 San Francisco 49ers roster
Quarterbacks (QB): 13 Tim Rattay; 11 Brandon Doman; 7 Ken Dorsey; 3 Cody Pickett; Running backs (RB): 32 Kevan Barlow; 40 Fred Beasley FB; 43 Maurice Hicks; 22 Terry Jackson; Wide receivers (WR): 83 Arnaz Battle; 89 Curtis Conway; 10 P. J. Fleck; 88 Derrick Hamilton; 85 Brandon Lloyd; 84 Cedrick Wilson; 81 Rashaun Woods; Tight ends (TE): 44 Steve Bush; 82 Eric Johnson; 49 Aaron Walker	Offensive linemen (OL): 75 Jerome Davis OT; 78 Scott Gragg OT; 52 Brock Gutierrez C; 77 Kwame Harris OT; 66 Eric Heitmann G; 69 Kyle Kosier G; 68 Rob Murphy C; 67 Scott Peters C; 65 Justin Smiley G; Defensive linemen (DL): 91 Anthony Adams DT; 93 Tony Brown DT; 93 Chris Cooper DT; 93 Josh Cooper DE; 95 John Engelberger DE; 71 Corey Smith DE; 64 Daleroy Stewart DT; 99 Andrew Williams DE; 97 Bryant Young DT	Linebackers (LB): 51 Saleem Rasheed OLB; 54 Richard Seigler OLB; 50 Derek Smith OLB; 53 Jeff Ulbrich MLB; 59 Ray Wells OLB; 55 Jamie Winborn OLB; Defensive backs (DB): 20 Mike Adams S; 35 Dwaine Carpenter CB; 27 Joselio Hanson CB; 38 Ronnie Heard FS; 28 Keith Lewis SS; 33 Tony Parrish SS; 31 Rayshun Reed CB; 36 Shawntae Spencer CB; 23 Jimmy Williams CB; Special teams (ST): 86 Brian Jennings LS; 4 Andy Lee P; 2 Todd Peterson K	Practice squad: 15 Bosley Allen WR; 76 Thomas Herrion G; 63 Norm Katnik C; 74 Tim Provost OT; 25 Ken Simonton RB; 57 Max Yates LB; 48 Richard Yancey S (IPP); 47 Doug Zeigler TE; Reserve: 96 Andre Carter DE (IR); 41 Jasen Isom FB (IR); 18 James Jordan WR (IR); 56 Brandon Moore LB (IR); 62 Jeremy Newberry C (IR); 98 Julian Peterson LB (IR); 29 Ahmed Plummer CB (IR); 13 Tim Rattay QB (IR); 24 Mike Rumph CB (IR); 90 Isaac Sopoaga DT (IR); 94 Brandon Whiting DE (IR); Rookies in italics 53 active, 11 reserve, 8 practice squad

== Preseason ==
Week	Date	Opponent	Result	Record	Venue	NFL.com recap
1	August 14	Oakland Raiders	L 30–33	0–1	Monster Park	Recap
2	August 21	at Chicago Bears	L 13–20	0–2	Soldier Field	Recap
3	August 27	at Minnesota Vikings	L 10–23	0–3	Hubert H. Humphrey Metrodome	Recap
4	September 2	San Diego Chargers	L 15–31	0–4	Monster Park	Recap

== Regular season ==
=== Schedule ===
Week	Date	Opponent	Result	Record	Venue	NFL.com recap
1	September 12	Atlanta Falcons	**L** 19–21	0–1	Monster Park	Recap
2	September 19	at New Orleans Saints	**L** 27–30	0–2	Louisiana Superdome	Recap
3	September 26	at **Seattle Seahawks**	**L** 0–34	0–3	Qwest Field	Recap
4	October 3	**St. Louis Rams**	**L** 14–24	0–4	Monster Park	Recap
5	October 10	**Arizona Cardinals**	**W** 31–28 (OT)	1–4	Monster Park	Recap
6	October 17	at New York Jets	**L** 14–22	1–5	Giants Stadium	Recap
7	Bye					
8	October 31	at Chicago Bears	**L** 13–23	1–6	Soldier Field	Recap
9	November 7	**Seattle Seahawks**	**L** 27–42	1–7	Monster Park	Recap
10	November 14	Carolina Panthers	**L** 27–37	1–8	Monster Park	Recap
11	November 21	at Tampa Bay Buccaneers	**L** 3–35	1–9	Raymond James Stadium	Recap
12	November 28	Miami Dolphins	**L** 17–24	1–10	Monster Park	Recap
13	December 5	at **St. Louis Rams**	**L** 6–16	1–11	Edward Jones Dome	Recap
14	December 12	at **Arizona Cardinals**	**W** 31–28 (OT)	2–11	Sun Devil Stadium	Recap
15	December 18	Washington Redskins	**L** 16–26	2–12	Monster Park	Recap
16	December 26	Buffalo Bills	**L** 7–41	2–13	Monster Park	Recap
17	January 2, 2005	at New England Patriots	**L** 7–21	2–14	Gillette Stadium	Recap
Note: Intra-division opponents are in **bold** text.

=== Game summaries ===
==== Week 1: vs. Atlanta Falcons ====
Week 1: Atlanta Falcons at San Francisco 49ers

Quarter	1	2	3	4	Total
**Falcons**	7	7	0	7	**21**
49ers	0	3	3	13	**19**

at San Francisco Stadium at Candlestick Point, San Francisco, California

- Date: Sunday, September 12, 2004
- Game time: 1:15 PST
- Game weather: 68 °F or 20 °C (Partly Cloudy)
- TV announcers (FOX): Curt Menefee & Tim Green

Game information
**1st Quarter**
- ATL – Alge Crumpler 15-yard pass from Michael Vick (Jay Feely kick) **ATL 7–0**

**2nd Quarter**

- ATL – Warrick Dunn 2-yard rush (Jay Feely kick) **ATL 14–0**
- SF – Todd Peterson 23-yard field goal **ATL 14–3**

**3rd Quarter**

- SF – Todd Peterson 32-yard field goal **14–6**

**4th Quarter**

- ATL – Warrick Dunn 9-yard rush (Jay Feely kick) **ATL 21–6**
- SF – Cedrick Wilson 8-yard pass from Tim Rattay (Todd Peterson kick) **ATL 21–13**
- SF – Eric Johnson 16-yard pass from Tim Rattay (pass failed) **ATL 21–19**

The 49ers opened the season at home against the Falcons. The game was statistically dominated by the 49ers, but they were required to make a fourth quarter comeback. The 49ers had an opportunity to tie the game, but a two-point conversion pass attempt from Tim Rattay fell harmlessly to the ground. The loss had the 49ers open the season at 0–1.

==== Week 2: at New Orleans Saints ====
Week 2: San Francisco 49ers at New Orleans Saints

Quarter	1	2	3	4	Total
49ers	3	14	3	7	**27**
**Saints**	10	10	3	7	**30**

at Superdome, New Orleans, Louisiana

- Date: Sunday, September 19, 2004
- Game time: 12:00PM CST
- Game weather: Played indoors (domed stadium)
- TV announcers (FOX): Kenny Albert & Brian Baldinger

Game information
**1st Quarter**
- SF – Todd Peterson 30-yard field goal **SF 3–0**
- NO – Joe Horn 8-yard pass from Aaron Brooks (John Carney kick) **NO 7–3**
- NO – John Carney 32-yard field goal **NO 10–3**

**2nd Quarter**

- SF – Kevan Barlow 10-yard rush (Todd Peterson kick) **TIED 10–10**
- NO – Jerome Pathon 37-yard pass from Aaron Brooks (John Carney kick) **NO 17–10**
- NO – John Carney 36-yard field goal **NO 20–10**
- SF – Kevan Barlow 1-yard rush (Todd Peterson kick) **NO 20–17**

**3rd Quarter**

- NO – John Carney 37-yard field goal **NO 23–17**
- SF – Todd Peterson 33-yard field goal **NO 23–20**

**4th Quarter**

- SF – Jamal Robertson 1-yard rush (Todd Peterson kick) **SF 27–23**
- NO – Donté Stallworth 16-yard pass from Aaron Brooks (John Carney kick) **NO 30–27**

In a high-scoring battle, in which both teams scored during all four quarters, the Saints bested the 49ers by a three-point differential. The 49ers took an early lead with a 30-yard field goal by Todd Peterson, but after the Saints scored, the 49ers played catch-up the rest of the game. With this close loss, the 49ers dropped to 0–2 on the season.

==== Week 3: at Seattle Seahawks ====
Week 3: San Francisco 49ers at Seattle Seahawks

Quarter	1	2	3	4	Total
49ers	0	0	0	0	**0**
**Seahawks**	17	7	10	0	**34**

at Qwest Field, Seattle, Washington

- Date: Sunday, September 26, 2004
- Game time: 1:15PM PST
- TV announcers (FOX): Ron Pitts & Tim Ryan

Game information
**1st Quarter**
- SEA – Josh Brown 35-yard field goal **SEA 3–0**
- SEA – Shaun Alexander 1-yard rush (Josh Brown kick) **SEA 10–0**
- SEA – Shaun Alexander 3-yard pass from Matt Hasselbeck (Josh Brown kick) **17–0**

**2nd Quarter**

- SEA – Shaun Alexander 1-yard rush (Josh Brown kick) **24–0**

**3rd Quarter**

- SEA – Itula Mili 1-yard pass from Matt Hasselbeck (Josh Brown kick) **31–0**
- SEA – Josh Brown 28-yard field goal **SEA 34–0**

The 49ers suffered a 34–0 loss to the Seattle Seahawks in week 3. It was the first shutout of a 49ers team since the Atlanta Falcons handed them a 7–0 loss in week 4 of the 1977 season (they were also shut out in week 1 that season by the Pittsburgh Steelers). This remains the longest such streak in the NFL. While the Seahawks scored several field goals and touchdowns, the 49ers could only manage nine first downs and turned the ball over four times (two interceptions and two lost fumbles). With the loss, the 49ers fell to 0–3.

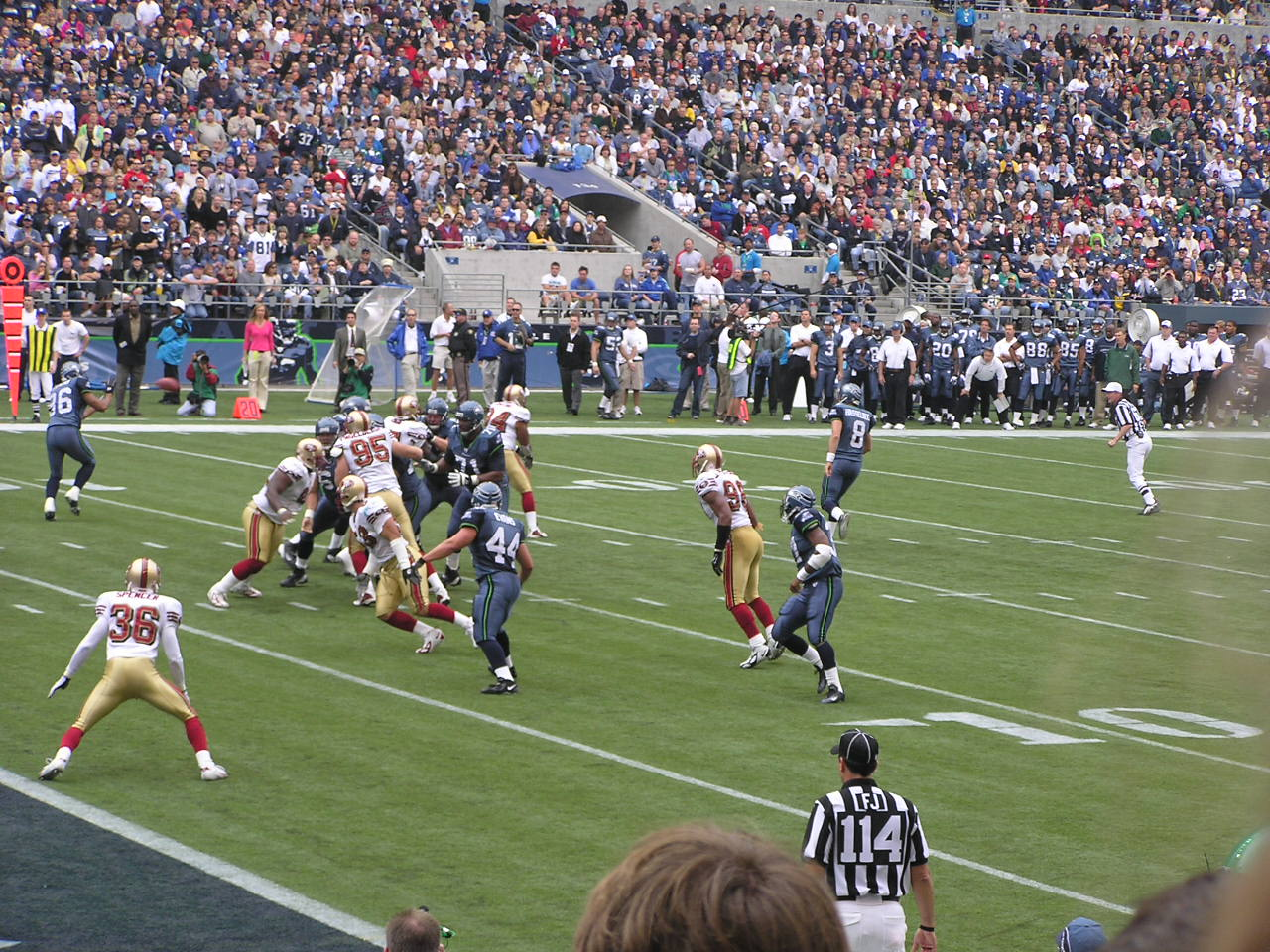
The Seahawks on the way to a touchdown in their week 3 shutout of San Francisco, September 26, 2004

==== Week 4: vs. St. Louis Rams ====
Week 4: St. Louis Rams at San Francisco 49ers

Quarter	1	2	3	4	Total
**Rams**	14	10	0	0	**24**
49ers	0	0	0	14	**14**

at Monster Park, San Francisco, California

- Date: Sunday, October 3, 2004
- Game time: 5:30PM PST
- Game weather: 62 °F or 16.7 °C (Partly Cloudy)
- TV announcers (ESPN): Pat Summerall, Joe Theismann, Paul Maguire & Suzy Kolber

Game information
**1st Quarter**
- STL – Joey Goodspeed 2-yard rush (Jeff Wilkins kick) **STL 7–0**
- STL – Shaun McDonald 6-yard pass from Marc Bulger (Jeff Wilkins kick) **STL 14–0**

**2nd Quarter**

- STL – Jeff Wilkins 20-yard field goal **STL 17–0**
- STL – Steven Jackson 2-yard rush (Jeff Wilkins kick) **24–0**

**4th Quarter**

- SF – Curtis Conway 9-yard pass from Tim Rattay (pass failed) **STL 24–7**
- SF – Rashaun Woods 18-yard pass from Tim Rattay (Curtis Conway pass from Tim Rattay) **STL 24–14**

Again the 49ers struggled, not putting any points on the board until the fourth quarter. Despite Tim Rattay throwing for 299 yards and the team gaining more first downs than the Rams, St. Louis' defense held fast, preventing the 49ers from scoring until the fourth quarter. The loss meant the 49ers started the season at 0–4.

==== Week 5: vs. Arizona Cardinals ====
Week 5: Arizona Cardinals at San Francisco 49ers

Quarter	1	2	3	4	OT	Total
Cardinals	0	14	0	14	0	**28**
**49ers**	0	6	6	16	3	**31**

at Monster Park, San Francisco, California

- Date: Sunday, October 10, 2004
- Game time: 1:15PM PST
- Game weather: 74 °F or 23.3 °C (Sunny)
- TV announcers (FOX): Ron Pitts & Tim Ryan

Game information
**2nd Quarter**
- AZ – Freddie Jones 16-yard pass from Josh McCown (Neil Rackers kick) **AZ 7–0**
- SF – Todd Peterson 37-yard field goal **AZ 7–3**
- AZ – Troy Hambrick 2-yard pass from Josh McCown (Neil Rackers kick) **AZ 14–3**
- SF – Todd Peterson 42-yard field goal **AZ 14–6**

**3rd Quarter**

- SF – Arnaz Battle 71-yard punt return (pass failed) **AZ 14–12**

**4th Quarter**

- AZ – Emmitt Smith 10-yard rush (Neil Rackers kick) **AZ 21–12**
- AZ – Larry Fitzgerald 24-yard pass from Josh McCown (Neil Rackers kick) **AZ 28–12**
- SF – Eric Johnson 6-yard pass from Tim Rattay (Tim Rattay run)**AZ 28–20**
- SF – Brandon Lloyd 23-yard pass from Tim Rattay (Brandon Lloyd pass from Tim Rattay) **TIED 28–28**

Overtime

- SF – Todd Peterson 32-yard field goal **SF 31–28**

The 49ers finally won their first game of the season in Week 5 against the Arizona Cardinals. After a scoreless first quarter, the Cardinals took a 16-point lead 28–12. In the fourth quarter, the 49ers scored 16 unanswered points (two touchdowns with two accompanying two-point conversions) to tie the game as regulation ended. In the overtime period, the 49ers' kicker Todd Peterson sent a 32-yard kick through the uprights, giving the 49ers their first victory of the season. Now in the win column, the 49ers were 1–4.

==== Week 6: at New York Jets ====
Week 6: San Francisco 49ers at New York Jets

Quarter	1	2	3	4	Total
49ers	7	7	0	0	**14**
**Jets**	0	3	6	13	**22**

at Giants Stadium, East Rutherford, New Jersey

- Date: Sunday, October 17, 2004
- Game time: 1:00PM EST
- TV announcers (FOX): Sam Rosen & Bill Maas

Game information
**1st Quarter**
- SF – Brandon Lloyd 33-yard pass from Tim Rattay (Todd Peterson kick) **SF 7–0**

**2nd Quarter**

- SF – Kevan Barlow 2-yard rush (Todd Peterson kick) **SF 14–0**
- NYJ – Doug Brien 43-yard field goal **SF 14–3**

**3rd Quarter**

- NYJ – LaMont Jordan 17-yard rush **SF 14–9**

**4th Quarter**

- NYJ – Curtis Martin 1-yard rush (pass failed) **NYJ 15–14**
- NYJ – Curtis Martin 9-yard rush (Doug Brien kick) **NYJ 22–14**

It seemed the 49ers would obtain their second straight victory when they secured a 14-point lead before halftime. However, the 49ers' defense fell apart after the half and the Jets scored 22 unanswered points and forced two turnovers to secure the win. With the 49ers' loss, they fell to 1–5 heading into their bye week.

==== Week 8: at Chicago Bears ====
Week 8: San Francisco 49ers at Chicago Bears

Quarter	1	2	3	4	Total
49ers	10	3	0	0	**13**
**Bears**	7	6	0	10	**23**

at Soldier Field, Chicago, Illinois

- Date: Sunday, October 31, 2004
- Game time: 7:30PM CST
- TV announcers (ESPN): Mike Patrick, Joe Theismann, Paul Maguire & Suzy Kolber

Game information
**1st Quarter**
- CHI – Bernard Berrian 49-yard pass from Craig Krenzel (Paul Edinger kick) **CHI 7–0**
- SF – Dwaine Carpenter 80-yard fumble return (Todd Peterson kick) **TIED 7–7**
- SF – Todd Peterson 48-yard field goal **SF 10–7**

**2nd Quarter**

- CHI – Paul Edinger 52-yard field goal **TIED 10–10**
- SF – Todd Peterson 51-yard field goal **SF 13–10**
- CHI – Paul Edinger 45-yard field goal **TIED 13–13**

**4th Quarter**

- CHI – Paul Edinger 27-yard field goal **CHI 16–13**
- CHI – Nathan Vasher 71-yard interception return (Paul Edinger kick) **CHI 23–13**

Coming out of their bye, the 49ers took an early lead, this time 10–7, however, they were shut out in the second half. Despite three turnovers, the Bears came away with the victory. Between the two teams, five field goals were scored, including two from longer than 50 yards. The loss dropped the 49ers to 1–6 on the season.

==== Week 9: vs. Seattle Seahawks ====
Week 9: Seattle Seahawks at San Francisco 49ers

Quarter	1	2	3	4	Total
**Seahawks**	7	14	14	7	**42**
49ers	14	3	7	3	**27**

at Monster Park, San Francisco, California

- Date: Sunday, November 7, 2004
- Game time: 1:00PM PST
- Game weather: 60 °F or 15.6 °C (Partly Cloudy)
- TV announcers (FOX): Curt Menefee & Tim Green

Game information
**1st Quarter**
- SF – Kevan Barlow 3-yard rush (Todd Peterson kick) **SF 7–0**
- SEA – Darrell Jackson 33-yard pass from Matt Hasselbeck (Josh Brown kick) **TIED 7–7**
- SF – Curtis Conway 28-yard pass from Tim Rattay (Todd Peterson kick) **SF 14–7**

**2nd Quarter**

- SEA – Shaun Alexander 1-yard rush (Josh Brown kick) **TIED 14–14**
- SEA – Shaun Alexander 4-yard rush (Josh Brown kick) **SEA 21–14**
- SF – Todd Peterson 27-yard field goal **SEA 21–17**

**3rd Quarter**

- SF – Brandon Lloyd 39-yard pass from Tim Rattay (Todd Peterson kick) **SF 24–21**
- SEA – Koren Robinson 25-yard pass from Matt Hasselbeck (Josh Brown kick) **SEA 28–24**
- SEA – Darrell Jackson 39-yard pass from Matt Hasselbeck (Josh Brown kick) **SEA 35–24**

**4th Quarter**

- SF – Todd Peterson 30-yard field goal **SEA 35–27**
- SEA – Anthony Simmons 23-yard interception return (Josh Brown kick) **SEA 42–27**

In another high-scoring affair, the Seahawks clinched a season sweep over the 49ers using their high-powered offense. The game was back-and-forth until the Seahawks gained a lead at 28–24 that they would not relinquish, beating the 49ers in nearly every statistical category. Their third straight loss dropped the 49ers to 1–7.

==== Week 10: vs. Carolina Panthers ====
Week 10: Carolina Panthers at San Francisco 49ers

Quarter	1	2	3	4	Total
**Panthers**	0	3	17	17	**37**
49ers	10	7	3	7	**27**

at Monster Park, San Francisco, California

- Date: Sunday, November 14, 2004
- Game time: 1:15PM PST
- Game weather: 63 °F or 17.2 °C (Mostly Cloudy)
- TV announcers (FOX): Thom Brennaman, J.C. Pearson & Glen Kuiper

Game information
**1st Quarter**
- SF – Kevan Barlow 1-yard rush (Todd Peterson kick) **SF 7–0**
- SF – Todd Peterson 28-yard field goal **SF 10–0**

**2nd Quarter**

- SF – Kevan Barlow 3-yard rush (Todd Peterson kick) **SF 17–0**
- CAR – John Kasay 37-yard field goal **SF 17–3**

**3rd Quarter**

- CAR – John Kasay 25-yard field goal **SF 17–6**
- CAR – Brandon Bennett 1-yard rush (Todd Sauerbrun kick) **SF 17–13**
- CAR – Muhsin Muhammad 40-yard pass from Jake Delhomme (Todd Sauerbrun kick) **CAR 20–17**
- SF – Todd Peterson 46-yard field goal **TIED 20–20**

**4th Quarter**

- SF – Brandon Lloyd 30-yard pass from Tim Rattay (Todd Peterson kick) **SF 27–20**
- CAR – Muhsin Muhammad 4-yard pass from Jake Delhomme (Todd Sauerbrun kick) **TIED 27–27**
- CAR – Todd Sauerbrun 34-yard field goal **CAR 30–27**
- CAR – Muhsin Muhammad 26-yard pass from Jake Delhomme (Todd Sauerbrun kick) **CAR 37–27**

It appeared the 49ers would snap their three-game losing streak when they took at 17–0 lead, however, the Panthers were able to slowly creep back into the game. Several field goals and touchdowns later, the game was tied at 27 and the Panthers scored a final field goal to come away with the win, 30–27. The loss dropped the 49ers to 1–8 and completed their second four-game losing streak of the season.

==== Week 11: at Tampa Bay Buccaneers ====
Week 11: San Francisco 49ers at Tampa Bay Buccaneers

Quarter	1	2	3	4	Total
49ers	0	0	3	0	**3**
**Buccaneers**	7	14	7	7	**35**

at Raymond James Stadium, Tampa, Florida

- Date: Sunday, November 21, 2004
- Game time: 1:00PM EST
- TV announcers (FOX): Ron Pitts & Tim Ryan

Game information
**1st Quarter**
- TB – Michael Pittman 14-yard rush (Martin Gramatica kick) **TB 7–0**

**2nd Quarter**

- TB – Joe Jurevicius 9-yard pass from Brian Griese (Martin Gramatica kick) **TB 14–0**
- TB – Joe Jurevicius 42-yard pass from Brian Griese (Martin Gramatica kick) **TB 21–0**

**3rd Quarter**

- TB – Michael Pittman 6-yard rush (Martin Gramatica kick)**TB 28–0**
- SF – Todd Peterson 47-yard field goal **TB 28–3**

**4th Quarter**

- TB – Torrie Cox 55-yard interception return (Martin Gramatica kick) **35–3**

The 49ers didn't have a chance in this lopsided game, falling to the Buccaneers 35–3. With an output of only 197 total yards, the 49ers' lone field goal came off the foot of kicker Todd Peterson from 47 yards out. Their fifth consecutive loss brought the 49ers down to 1–9 (0-4 against the NFC South).

==== Week 12: vs. Miami Dolphins ====
Week 12: Miami Dolphins at San Francisco 49ers

Quarter	1	2	3	4	Total
**Dolphins**	7	0	0	17	**24**
49ers	0	3	0	14	**17**

at Monster Park, San Francisco, California

- Date: Sunday, November 28, 2004
- Game time: 1:15PM PST
- Game weather: 55 °F or 12.8 °C (Sunny)
- TV announcers (CBS): Brad Sham & Richard Baldinger

Game information
**1st Quarter**
- MIA – Chris Chambers 25-yard pass from A. J. Feeley (Olindo Mare kick) **MIA 7–0**

**2nd Quarter**

- SF – Todd Peterson 19-yard field goal **MIA 7–3**

**4th Quarter**

- SF – Derek Smith 46-yard fumble return (Todd Peterson kick) **SF 10–7**
- MIA – Randy McMichael 15-yard pass from A. J. Feeley (Olindo Mare kick) **MIA 14–10**
- MIA – Olindo Mare 50-yard field goal **MIA 17–10**
- MIA – Derrick Pope 1-yard fumble return (Olindo Mare kick) **MIA 24–10**
- SF – Maurice Hicks 1-yard rush (Todd Peterson kick) **MIA 24–17**

Looking to snap their five-game losing streak, the 49ers were, statistically, the better team, but three turnovers doomed their chances. The 49ers led at one point, 10–7, but the Dolphins regained the lead in the fourth quarter and the 49ers came away with another loss, 24–17. This loss was their sixth in succession and tenth of the season.

==== Week 13: at St. Louis Rams ====
Week 13: San Francisco 49ers at St. Louis Rams

Quarter	1	2	3	4	Total
49ers	3	0	3	0	**6**
**Rams**	3	10	0	3	**16**

at Edward Jones Dome, St. Louis, Missouri

- Date: Sunday, December 5, 2004
- Game time: 12:00PM CST
- Game weather: Played indoors (domed stadium)
- TV announcers (FOX): Curt Menefee & Tim Green

Game information
**1st Quarter**
- STL – Jeff Wilkins 29-yard field goal **STL 3–0**
- SF – Todd Peterson 51-yard field goal **TIED 3–3**

**2nd Quarter**

- STL – Torry Holt 22-yard pass from Chris Chandler (Jeff Wilkins kick) **STL 10–3**
- STL – Jeff Wilkins 52-yard field goal **STL 13–3**

**3rd Quarter**

- SF – Todd Peterson 40-yard field goal **STL 13–6**

**4th Quarter**

- STL – Jeff Wilkins 52-yard field goal **STL 16–6**

In a low-scoring contest, the 49ers lost to the division rival Rams by a score of 16–6. The 49ers were limited to only nine first downs in the game and could only manage two field goals, one of which was from 51 yards. This game marked the 49ers' seventh consecutive loss as they fell to 1–11 and they were swept by the Rams for the first time since 2001.

==== Week 14: at Arizona Cardinals ====
Week 14: San Francisco 49ers at Arizona Cardinals

Quarter	1	2	3	4	OT	Total
**49ers**	7	14	7	0	3	**31**
Cardinals	0	3	7	18	0	**28**

at Sun Devil Stadium, Tempe, Arizona

- Date: Sunday, December 12, 2004
- Game time: 2:15PM MST
- TV announcers (FOX): Dan Miller & Dave Wannstedt

Game information
**1st Quarter**
- SF – Brandon Lloyd 5-yard pass from Ken Dorsey (Todd Peterson kick) **SF 7–0**

**2nd Quarter**

- SF – Cedrick Wilson 19-yard pass from Ken Dorsey (Todd Peterson kick) **SF 14–0**
- SF – Maurice Hicks 1-yard rush (Todd Peterson kick) **SF 21–0**
- AZ – Neil Rackers 44-yard field goal **SF 21–3**

**3rd Quarter**

- SF – Cedrick Wilson 27-yard pass from Ken Dorsey (Todd Peterson kick) **SF 28–3**
- AZ – Obafemi Ayanbadejo 4-yard rush (Neil Rackers kick) **SF 28–10**

**4th Quarter**

- AZ – Obafemi Ayanbadejo 1-yard rush (Neil Rackers kick) **SF 28–17**
- AZ – Emmitt Smith 8-yard rush (Josh McCown run) **SF 28–25**
- AZ – Neil Rackers 22-yard field goal **TIED 28–28**

**Overtime**

- SF – Todd Peterson 31-yard field goal **SF 31–28**

In an overtime game, the 49ers managed to snap their seven-game losing streak by outdueling the Arizona Cardinals, 31–28. The 49ers seemingly had this game already wrapped up when they took a 28-3 lead, but the Cardinals fought back and scored 18 points in the fourth quarter to force overtime. A 31-yard field goal by Todd Peterson sealed the victory for the 49ers. Breaking their seven-game losing streak, the 49ers improved to 2–11. At this point of the season, the 49ers were 2–0 against the Cardinals and 0–11 against the rest of the league (They finished 2-4 against the NFC West).

==== Week 15: vs. Washington Redskins ====
Week 15: Washington Redskins at San Francisco 49ers

Quarter	1	2	3	4	Total
**Redskins**	7	16	3	0	**26**
49ers	7	2	0	7	**16**

at Monster Park, San Francisco, California

- Date: Saturday, December 18, 2004
- Game time: 2:00PM PST
- Game weather: 55 °F or 12.8 °C, sunny
- TV announcers (FOX): Kenny Albert & Brian Baldinger

Game information
**1st Quarter**
- WAS – Robert Royal 12-yard pass from Patrick Ramsey (Jeff Chandler kick) **WAS 7–0**
- SF – Brandon Lloyd 17-yard pass from Ken Dorsey (Todd Peterson kick) **TIED 7–7**

**2nd Quarter**

- WAS – Jeff Chandler 49-yard field goal **WAS 10–7**
- WAS – Jeff Chandler 25-yard field goal **WAS 13–7**
- WAS – Jeff Chandler 20-yard field goal **WAS 16–7**
- SF – Tom Tupa punts no gain, safety. (Note: Penalty on Tom Tupa: Illegal Kick (declined)) **WAS 16–9**
- WAS – Antonio Pierce 78-yard interception return (Jeff Chandler kick) **WAS 23–9**

**3rd Quarter**

- WAS – Jeff Chandler 26-yard field goal **WAS 26–9**

**4th Quarter**

- SF – Curtis Conway 11-yard pass from Ken Dorsey (Todd Peterson kick) **WAS 26–16**

The 49ers failed in their attempt to string together two victories, losing this contest 26–16 to the Redskins. The 49ers never led, but they did score a rare safety in the second quarter. Statistically, it was a close game, both teams posting similar yardage and first downs, however, four interceptions by 49ers quarterback Ken Dorsey sealed the loss and dropped the team to 2–12.

==== Week 16: vs. Buffalo Bills ====
Week 16: Buffalo Bills at San Francisco 49ers

Quarter	1	2	3	4	Total
**Bills**	0	17	10	14	**41**
49ers	0	0	0	7	**7**

at Sunday, December 26, 2004

- Date: Monster Park, San Francisco, California
- Game time: 1:00PM PST
- Game weather: 53 °F or 11.7 °C
- TV announcers (CBS): Don Criqui & Steve Tasker

Game information
**2nd Quarter**
- BUF – Willis McGahee 3-yard rush (Rian Lindell kick)
- BUF – Rian Lindell 23-yard field goal
- BUF – Lee Evans 8-yard pass from Drew Bledsoe (Rian Lindell kick)

**3rd Quarter**

- BUF – Rian Lindell 31-yard field goal
- BUF – Willis McGahee 1-yard rush (Rian Lindell kick)

**4th Quarter**

- BUF – Lee Evans 33-yard pass from Shane Matthews (Rian Lindell kick)
- BUF – Shaud Williams 27-yard rush (Rian Lindell kick)
- SF – Kevan Barlow 1-yard rush (Todd Peterson kick)

In a blowout, the Bills dominated the 49ers 41–7. While the Bills managed to score in the double-digits in three of the four-quarters, the 49ers only managed a single touchdown in the final minutes of the game. This was the second consecutive game in which the 49ers had four turnovers (this time three interceptions and one fumble) and the Bills were able to roll up over twice as many total yards as the 49ers. With the loss, the 49ers fell to 2–13 going into the final game of the season.

==== Week 17: at New England Patriots ====
Week 17: San Francisco 49ers at New England Patriots

Quarter	1	2	3	4	Total
49ers	7	0	0	0	**7**
**Patriots**	0	7	7	7	**21**

at Gillette Stadium, Foxborough, Massachusetts

- Date: Sunday, January 2, 2005
- Game time: 1:00PM EST
- TV announcers (FOX): Curt Menefee & Tim Green

Game information
**1st Quarter**
- SF – Steve Bush 4-yard pass from Ken Dorsey (Todd Peterson kick)

**2nd Quarter**

- NE – Mike Vrabel 1-yard pass from Tom Brady (Adam Vinatieri kick)

**3rd Quarter**

- NE – Deion Branch 8-yard pass from Tom Brady (Adam Vinatieri kick)

**4th Quarter**

- NE – Corey Dillon 6-yard rush (Adam Vinatieri kick)

Hoping to end their miserable season with a win, the 49ers flew to Gillette Stadium to play a Patriots team that was looking for the second seed in the AFC playoffs. In a game in which one touchdown was scored each quarter, the 49ers lost to the New England Patriots 21–7. The 49ers struck first, but the Patriots defense held them to that single touchdown. Both teams were riddled with mistakes, both turnovers and penalties; however, the Patriots were able to capitalize on the 49ers' errors.

The 49ers closed their season at 2–14 on a three-game losing streak (0-4 against the AFC East), giving the team the first overall pick in the 2005 draft.

== Standings ==
NFC West
	W	L	T	PCT	DIV	CONF	PF	PA	STK
^{(4)} Seattle Seahawks	9	7	0	.563	3–3	8–4	371	373	W2
^{(5)} St. Louis Rams	8	8	0	.500	5–1	7–5	319	392	W2
Arizona Cardinals	6	10	0	.375	2–4	5–7	284	322	W1
San Francisco 49ers	2	14	0	.125	2–4	2–10	259	452	L3

NFC
#	Team	Division	W	L	T	PCT	DIV	CONF	SOS	SOV	STK
Division leaders
1	Philadelphia Eagles	East	13	3	0	.813	6–0	11–1	.453	.409	L2
2	Atlanta Falcons	South	11	5	0	.688	4–2	8–4	.420	.432	L2
3	Green Bay Packers	North	10	6	0	.625	5–1	9–3	.457	.419	W2
4	Seattle Seahawks	West	9	7	0	.563	3–3	8–4	.445	.368	W2
Wild cards
5 (Note: St. Louis clinched the NFC #5 seed instead of Minnesota or New Orleans based on better conference record (7–5 to Minnesota’s 5–7 to New Orleans’ 6–6).)	St. Louis Rams	West	8	8	0	.500	5–1	7–5	.488	.438	W2
6 (Note: Minnesota clinched the NFC #6 seed instead of New Orleans based on head-to-head victory.)	Minnesota Vikings	North	8	8	0	.500	3–3	5–7	.480	.406	L2
Did not qualify for the postseason
7	New Orleans Saints	South	8	8	0	.500	3–3	6–6	.465	.427	W4
8	Carolina Panthers	South	7	9	0	.438	3–3	6–6	.496	.366	L1
9 (Note: Detroit finished ahead of Arizona and New York Giants based upon head-to-head record (2–0 versus Arizona’s 1–1 and New York Giants’ 0–2). Division tiebreak was initially used to eliminate Dallas and Washington.)	Detroit Lions	North	6	10	0	.375	2–4	5–7	.496	.417	L2
10	Arizona Cardinals	West	6	10	0	.375	2–4	5–7	.461	.417	W1
11 (Note: New York Giants finished ahead of Dallas and Washington in the NFC East based on better head-to-head record (3–1 to Dallas‘ 2–2 to Washington’s 1–3).)	New York Giants	East	6	10	0	.375	3–3	5–7	.516	.417	W1
12 (Note: Dallas finished ahead of Washington in the NFC East based on head-to-head sweep.)	Dallas Cowboys	East	6	10	0	.375	2–4	5–7	.516	.375	L1
13	Washington Redskins	East	6	10	0	.375	1–5	6–6	.477	.333	W1
14 (Note: Tampa Bay finished ahead of Chicago based upon head-to-head victory.)	Tampa Bay Buccaneers	South	5	11	0	.313	2–4	4–8	.477	.413	L4
15	Chicago Bears	North	5	11	0	.313	2–4	4–8	.465	.388	L4
16	San Francisco 49ers	West	2	14	0	.125	2–4	2–10	.488	.375	L3
Tiebreakers (Note: When breaking ties for three or more teams under the NFL's rules, they are first broken within divisions, then comparing only the highest-ranked remaining team from each division.)
