= 2005 San Francisco 49ers season =

American football team season

- Owner: Denise DeBartolo York and John York
- General manager: Mike Nolan
- President: John York
- Head coach: Mike Nolan
- Home stadium: Monster Park

Results
- Record: 4–12
- Division place: 4th NFC West
- Playoffs: Did not qualify
- Pro Bowlers: None

Uniform
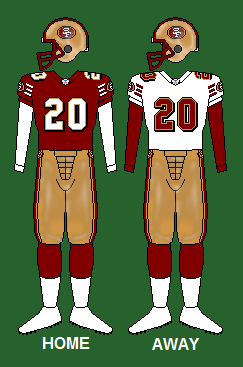

The 2005 San Francisco 49ers season was the 60th year for the team overall, and their 56th season in the National Football League (NFL). They improved their two-win 2004 season by two games.

Former head coach Dennis Erickson had been fired just after the end of the 2004 season, and Mike Nolan (son of former 49ers head coach Dick Nolan) took the helm. This season began with the team's third head coach in four seasons.

Despite having a better record than the 2–14 Texans and 3–13 Saints, statistics site Football Outsiders calculated that the 49ers were actually, play-for-play, not only the worst team in the NFL in 2005, but the worst team they have ever tracked. According to the site, the 49ers offense in 2005 is the third-worst they had ever tracked. (Note: Better only than only the 1992 Seattle Seahawks and 2002 Houston Texans' offenses) The 49ers 3,587 total offensive yards were the fewest of any team in 2005, and their 239 points scored were third-worst in the NFL. Despite finishing with the worst record in 2004, the 49ers ended up playing the ninth-toughest schedule in the NFL in 2005 as they played eight games against eventual playoff teams, including games against the top seeds in both conferences, the Seattle Seahawks and the Indianapolis Colts, and games against the Chicago Bears and the Tampa Bay Buccaneers. The 49ers played the Bears and Buccaneers because those teams, like the 49ers, had finished last in their NFC divisions in 2004, but unlike the 49ers both teams improved enough to win their divisions in 2005.

San Francisco's 1,898 team passing yards in 2005 were the lowest such total in the decade of the 2000s.

== Offseason ==
| Additions | Subtractions |
|---|---|
| WR Johnnie Morton (Chiefs) | G Kyle Kosier (Lions) |
| FB Chris Hetherington (Raiders) | DE John Engelberger (Broncos) |
| DT Travis Hall (Falcons) | WR Cedrick Wilson Sr. (Steelers) |
| | T Scott Gragg (Jets) |
| | DT Daleroy Stewart (Texans) |

=== 2005 Draft ===
The 49ers had the first pick in the 2005 draft, and selected Utah quarterback Alex Smith. The 49ers were in need of a quarterback, and the two top prospects at the position were Smith and California quarterback Aaron Rodgers. Rodgers, the second quarterback drafted, famously dropped to the 24th pick on draft day, and went to the Green Bay Packers. Rodgers is a four-time league MVP, has been voted to the Pro Bowl ten times in his career, and won Super Bowl XLV with the Packers in 2010. Smith enjoyed a successful if unspectacular career with the 49ers, starting all sixteen games for two full seasons and taking them to the NFC Championship game in 2011. He was traded to the Kansas City Chiefs in 2013, where he would earn most of his accolades, before being traded to Washington, where he won Comeback Player of the Year in 2020 following a horrific leg injury two years earlier.

2005 San Francisco 49ers draft
| Round | Pick | Player | Position | College | Notes |
| 1 | 1 | Alex Smith * | QB | Utah | |
| 2 | 33 | David Baas | C | Michigan | |
| 3 | 65 | Frank Gore * | RB | Miami (FL) | |
| 3 | 94 | Adam Snyder | G | Oregon | |
| 5 | 137 | Ronald Fields | DT | Mississippi State | |
| 5 | 174 | Rasheed Marshall | WR | West Virginia | |
| 6 | 205 | Derrick Johnson | CB | Washington | |
| 7 | 215 | Daven Holly | CB | Cincinnati | |
| 7 | 223 | Marcus Maxwell | WR | Oregon | |
| 7 | 248 | Patrick Estes | TE | Virginia | |
| 7 | 249 | Billy Bajema | TE | Oklahoma State | |
Made roster † Pro Football Hall of Fame * Made at least one Pro Bowl during career

== Staff ==
2005 San Francisco 49ers staff
| Front office {{{front_office}}} Head coaches: Head coach – Mike Nolan; Assistant head coach/linebackers – Mike Singletary; Special assistant to the head coach – Robert Talley; Offensive coaches: Offensive coordinator – Mike McCarthy; Quarterbacks – Jim Hostler; Running backs – Bishop Harris; Senior assistant/wide receivers – Jerry Sullivan; Tight ends – Pete Hoener; Offensive line – George Warhop; Assistant offensive line/quality control – Ben McAdoo | Defensive coaches: Defensive coordinator – Bill Davis; Defensive line – Gary Emanuel; Defensive backs/secondary – A.J. Christoff; Assistant defensive backs – Vance Joseph; Defensive assistant/outside linebackers – Jason Tarver; Special teams coaches: Special teams coordinator – Larry Mac Duff; Assistant special teams – Jeff Rodgers; Strength and conditioning: Strength and conditioning – Johnny Parker; Assistant strength and conditioning – Duane Carlisle |

== Roster ==
2005 San Francisco 49ers roster
| Quarterbacks (QB): 13 Tim Rattay; 7 Ken Dorsey; 3 Cody Pickett; 11 Alex Smith; Running backs (RB): 40 Fred Beasley FB; 21 Frank Gore; 41 Chris Hetherington FB; 43 Maurice Hicks; 22 Terry Jackson; Wide receivers (WR): 18 Otis Amey; 83 Arnaz Battle; 85 Brandon Lloyd; 89 Rasheed Marshall; 19 Marcus Maxwell; 15 Jason McAddley; 80 Johnnie Morton; Tight ends (TE): 47 Billy Bajema; 44 Steve Bush; 49 Terry Jones | Offensive linemen (OL): 64 David Baas G; 67 Anthony Clement OT; 76 Harvey Dahl OT; 78 Patrick Estes OT; 77 Kwame Harris OT; 66 Eric Heitmann G/C; 65 Justin Smiley G; 68 Adam Snyder OT; 69 Tony Wragge C; Defensive linemen (DL): 91 Anthony Adams DE; 94 Marques Douglas DE; 95 Ronald Fields NT; 92 Travis Hall DE; 90 Isaac Sopoaga NT; 97 Bryant Young DE | Linebackers (LB): 96 Andre Carter OLB; 57 Jim Maxwell ILB; 56 Brandon Moore ILB; 98 Julian Peterson OLB; 50 Derek Smith ILB; 58 Corey Smith OLB; 59 Renauld Williams ILB; Defensive backs (DB): 20 Mike Adams FS; 25 Marques Anderson SS; 38 Ben Emanuel SS; 23 Derrick Johnson CB; 28 Keith Lewis FS; 29 Ahmed Plummer CB; 35 Kris Richard CB; 36 Shawntae Spencer CB; 26 Bruce Thornton CB; 30 B. J. Tucker CB; Special teams (ST): 86 Brian Jennings LS; 4 Andy Lee P; 6 Joe Nedney K | Practice squad: 31 Brian Allen RB; 27 Deandre' Eiland S; 45 Zak Keasey FB; 74 Scott Scharff DE; 48 Trent Smith TE; 60 Ben Sobieski G; 71 Sam Wilder OT; Reserve: 32 Kevan Barlow RB (IR); 93 Chris Cooper DE (IR); 10 P. J. Fleck WR (IR); 88 Derrick Hamilton WR (PUP); 75 Jonas Jennings OT (IR); 82 Eric Johnson TE (IR); 62 Jeremy Newberry C (IR); 33 Tony Parrish SS (IR); 51 Saleem Rasheed ILB (IR); 24 Mike Rumph FS (IR); 53 Jeff Ulbrich ILB (IR); 81 Rashaun Woods WR (IR); Rookies in italics 53 active, 12 reserve, 7 practice squad |

== Preseason ==
| Week | Date | Opponent | Result | Record | Venue |
|---|---|---|---|---|---|
| 1 | August 13 | Oakland Raiders | W 21–13 | 1–0 | Monster Park |
| 2 | August 20 | at Denver Broncos | L 21–26 | 1–1 | Invesco Field |
| 3 | August 26 | Tennessee Titans | W 16–13 (OT) | 2–1 | Monster Park |
| 4 | September 1 | at San Diego Chargers | L 24–28 | 2–2 | Qualcomm Stadium |

== Regular season ==
=== Schedule ===
| Week | Date | Opponent | Result | Record | Venue | Recap |
|---|---|---|---|---|---|---|
| 1 | September 11 | **St. Louis Rams** | **W** 28–25 | 1–0 | Monster Park | Recap |
| 2 | September 18 | at Philadelphia Eagles | **L** 3–42 | 1–1 | Lincoln Financial Field | Recap |
| 3 | September 25 | Dallas Cowboys | **L** 31–34 | 1–2 | Monster Park | Recap |
| 4 | October 2 | at **Arizona Cardinals** | **L** 14–31 | 1–3 | Estadio Azteca (Mexico City) | Recap |
| 5 | October 9 | Indianapolis Colts | **L** 3–28 | 1–4 | Monster Park | Recap |
| 6 | Bye | | | | | |
| 7 | October 23 | at Washington Redskins | **L** 17–52 | 1–5 | FedExField | Recap |
| 8 | October 30 | Tampa Bay Buccaneers | **W** 15–10 | 2–5 | Monster Park | Recap |
| 9 | November 6 | New York Giants | **L** 6–24 | 2–6 | Monster Park | Recap |
| 10 | November 13 | at Chicago Bears | **L** 9–17 | 2–7 | Soldier Field | Recap |
| 11 | November 20 | **Seattle Seahawks** | **L** 25–27 | 2–8 | Monster Park | Recap |
| 12 | November 27 | at Tennessee Titans | **L** 22–33 | 2–9 | The Coliseum | Recap |
| 13 | December 4 | **Arizona Cardinals** | **L** 10–17 | 2–10 | Monster Park | Recap |
| 14 | December 11 | at **Seattle Seahawks** | **L** 3–41 | 2–11 | Qwest Field | Recap |
| 15 | December 18 | at Jacksonville Jaguars | **L** 9–10 | 2–12 | Alltel Stadium | Recap |
| 16 | December 24 | at **St. Louis Rams** | **W** 24–20 | 3–12 | Edward Jones Dome | Recap |
| 17 | January 1 | Houston Texans | **W** 20–17 (OT) | 4–12 | Monster Park | Recap |
Note: Intra-division opponents are in **bold** text.

=== Game summaries ===
==== Week 1: vs. St. Louis Rams ====
| Team | 1 | 2 | 3 | 4 | Total |
|---|---|---|---|---|---|
| Rams | 3 | 6 | 3 | 13 | 25 |
| • 49ers | 0 | 21 | 7 | 0 | 28 |

- Date: September 11
- Location: Monster Park, San Francisco, California
- Game start: 4:15 p.m. EST
- Game weather: 64 °F or 17.8 °C (Partly Cloudy)
- TV announcers (Fox): Carter Blackburn, Howard Griffith and Amy Gutierrez

Scoring summary
| 1 | STL | Jeff Wilkins 30-yard field goal | Rams 3–0 |
| 2 | STL | Jeff Wilkins 41-yard field goal | Rams 6–0 |
| 2 | SF | Brandon Lloyd 35-yard pass from Tim Rattay (Joe Nedney kick) | 49ers 7–6 |
| 2 | SF | Otis Amey 75-yard punt return (Joe Nedney kick) | 49ers 14–6 |
| 2 | SF | Arnaz Battle 6-yard pass from Tim Rattay (Joe Nedney kick) | 49ers 21–6 |
| 2 | STL | Jeff Wilkins 33-yard field goal | 49ers 21–9 |
| 3 | SF | Kevan Barlow 9-yard run (Joe Nedney kick) | 49ers 28–9 |
| 3 | STL | Jeff Wilkins 41-yard field goal | 49ers 28–12 |
| 4 | STL | Isaac Bruce 29-yard pass from Marc Bulger (run failed) | 49ers 28–18 |
| 4 | STL | Brandon Manumaleuna 6-yard pass from Marc Bulger (Jeff Wilkins kick) | 49ers 28–25 |

In Mike Nolan's debut as head coach, the 49ers beat divisional rival St. Louis Rams. Quarterback Tim Rattay got the start, the 49ers were able to build a considerable lead in the 3rd quarter, however, their defense fell apart and allowed the Rams to score 16 straight points, including 13 in the 4th quarter. The Rams were poised to score again, but Michael Adams intercepted Marc Bulger with 52 seconds left to seal the victory and start the season with a win.

==== Week 2: at Philadelphia Eagles ====
| Team | 1 | 2 | 3 | 4 | Total |
|---|---|---|---|---|---|
| 49ers | 0 | 0 | 3 | 0 | 3 |
| • Eagles | 14 | 14 | 7 | 7 | 42 |

- Date: September 18
- Location: Lincoln Financial Field, Philadelphia, Pennsylvania
- Game start: 1:00 p.m. EST
- TV announcers (Fox): Dick Stockton, Daryl Johnston and Tony Siragusa

Scoring summary
| 1 | PHI | Terrell Owens 68-yard pass from Donovan McNabb (David Akers kick) | Eagles 7–0 |
| 1 | PHI | L.J. Smith 6-yard pass from Donovan McNabb (David Akers kick) | Eagles 14–0 |
| 2 | PHI | Terrell Owens 42-yard pass from Donovan McNabb (David Akers kick) | Eagles 21–0 |
| 2 | PHI | Brian Westbrook 2-yard pass from Donovan McNabb (Mark Simoneau kick) | Eagles 28–0 |
| 3 | SF | Joe Nedney 32-yard field goal | Eagles 28–3 |
| 3 | PHI | Greg Lewis 6-yard pass from Donovan McNabb (David Akers kick) | Eagles 35–3 |
| 4 | PHI | Lamar Gordon 6-yard run (David Akers kick) | Eagles 42–3 |

The 49ers were handily beaten up by the Philadelphia Eagles as Donovan McNabb threw five touchdown passes, four of which were in the first 19 minutes of the game. In Terrell Owens' first game against his former team he had 143 yards receiving and two touchdowns. Rookie quarterback Alex Smith made his regular season debut, playing the final possession and throwing one incomplete pass. The loss dropped the 49ers to 1–1.

==== Week 3 vs. Dallas Cowboys ====
| Team | 1 | 2 | 3 | 4 | Total |
|---|---|---|---|---|---|
| • Cowboys | 0 | 12 | 7 | 15 | 34 |
| 49ers | 7 | 17 | 7 | 0 | 31 |

- Date: September 25
- Location: Monster Park, San Francisco, California
- Game start: 4PM ET/1PM PT PST
- Game weather: 78 °F or 25.6 °C (Sunny)
- TV announcers (Fox): Dick Stockton, Daryl Johnston and Tony Siragusa

Scoring summary
| 1 | SF | Arnaz Battle 15-yard pass from Tim Rattay (Joe Nedney kick) | 49ers 7–0 |
| 2 | DAL | Drew Bledsoe 6-yard run (kick failed) | 49ers 7–6 |
| 2 | SF | Brandon Lloyd 89-yard pass from Tim Rattay (Joe Nedney kick) | 49ers 14–6 |
| 2 | SF | Tony Parrish 34-yard interception return (Joe Nedney kick) | 49ers 21–6 |
| 2 | DAL | Jason Witten 6-yard pass from Drew Bledsoe (pass failed) | 49ers 21–12 |
| 2 | SF | Joe Nedney 20-yard field goal | 49ers 24–12 |
| 3 | DAL | Julius Jones 1 yard run (Jose Cortez kick) | 49ers 24–19 |
| 3 | SF | Brandon Lloyd 13-yard pass from Tim Rattay (Joe Nedney kick) | 49ers 31–19 |
| 4 | DAL | Julius Jones 1 yard run (Jose Cortez kick) | 49ers 31–26 |
| 4 | DAL | Keyshawn Johnson 14-yard pass from Drew Bledsoe (Keyshawn Johnson pass from Drew Bledsoe) | Cowboys 34–31 |

The rivalry between the 49ers and the Cowboys continued in traditional high-scoring fashion. The 49ers maintained the lead for the majority of the game; however, their defense fell apart in the final quarter as they allowed the Cowboys to score fifteen consecutive points while the offense failed to put a single point on the board. The loss dropped the 49ers to 1–2 to start the season.

==== Week 4: at Arizona Cardinals ====
| Team | 1 | 2 | 3 | 4 | Total |
|---|---|---|---|---|---|
| 49ers | 14 | 0 | 0 | 0 | 14 |
| • Cardinals | 0 | 12 | 6 | 13 | 31 |

- Date: October 2
- Location: Azteca Stadium, Mexico City, Mexico
- TV announcers (ESPN): Mike Patrick, Joe Theismann and Paul Maguire

Scoring summary
| 1 | SF | Derek Smith recovered fumble in end zone (Joe Nedney kick) | 49ers 7–0 |
| 1 | SF | Derrick Johnson 78-yard fumble return (Joe Nedney kick) | 49ers 14–0 |
| 2 | ARI | Neil Rackers 40-yard field goal | 49ers 14–3 |
| 2 | ARI | Neil Rackers 45-yard field goal | 49ers 14–6 |
| 2 | ARI | Larry Fitzgerald 17-yard pass from Josh McCown (kick failed) | 49ers 14–12 |
| 3 | ARI | Neil Rackers 48-yard field goal | Cardinals 15–14 |
| 3 | ARI | Neil Rackers 23-yard field goal | Cardinals 18–14 |
| 4 | ARI | Neil Rackers 43-yard field goal | Cardinals 21–14 |
| 4 | ARI | Anquan Boldin 27-yard pass from Josh McCown (Neil Rackers kick) | Cardinals 28–14 |
| 4 | ARI | Neil Rackers 24-yard field goal | Cardinals 31–14 |

A game played in Mexico City at Azteca Stadium garnered the largest crowd in regular season history, with 103,467 fans in attendance. The 49ers started off well, scoring two touchdowns in the first quarter, but failed to score again. The Cardinals then began to dominate, scoring 31 consecutive points, including six field goals by Neil Rackers. San Francisco's backup quarterback Alex Smith was given the green light in the fourth quarter and threw six completions, including the first completed pass of his career. The International game gave the Cardinals their first win of the 2005 season while the loss dropped the 49ers to 1–3.

==== Week 5: vs. Indianapolis Colts ====
| Team | 1 | 2 | 3 | 4 | Total |
|---|---|---|---|---|---|
| • Colts | 7 | 7 | 0 | 14 | 28 |
| 49ers | 0 | 0 | 3 | 0 | 3 |

- Date: October 9
- Location: Monster Park, San Francisco, California
- Game start: 4PM ET/1PM PT PST
- Game weather: 73 °F or 22.8 °C (Sunny)
- TV announcers (CBS): Dick Enberg, Dan Dierdorf, and Armen Keteyian

Scoring summary
| 1 | IND | Dominic Rhodes 6-yard run (Mike Vanderjagt kick) | Colts 7–0 |
| 2 | IND | Cato June 24-yard interception return (Mike Vanderjagt kick) | Colts 14–0 |
| 3 | SF | Joe Nedney 30-yard field goal | Colts 14–3 |
| 4 | IND | Edgerrin James 4-yard run (Mike Vanderjagt kick) | Colts 21–3 |
| 4 | IND | Troy Walters 18-yard pass from Peyton Manning (Mike Vanderjagt kick) | Colts 28–3 |

In Alex Smith's first NFL start, he threw four interceptions and was sacked five times. Aside from Kevan Barlow, the 49ers offense failed to get comfortable and only managed a single field goal. This was the second straight week in which the 49ers' offense failed to score a touchdown. The loss to the undefeated Colts dropped the 49ers to 1–4, heading into their bye week.

==== Week 7: at Washington Redskins ====
| Team | 1 | 2 | 3 | 4 | Total |
|---|---|---|---|---|---|
| 49ers | 7 | 0 | 0 | 10 | 17 |
| • Redskins | 14 | 21 | 10 | 7 | 52 |

- Date: October 23
- Location: FedExField, Landover, Maryland
- Game start: 1PM ET/10AM PT
- TV announcers (Fox): Kenny Albert, Daryl Johnston and Tony Siragusa

Scoring summary
| 1 | WSH | Mike Sellers 2-yard pass from Mark Brunell (Nick Novak kick) | Redskins 7–0 |
| 1 | WSH | Clinton Portis 5-yard run (Nick Novak kick) | Redskins 14–0 |
| 1 | SF | Kevan Barlow 17-yard run (Joe Nedney kick) | Redskins 14–7 |
| 2 | WSH | Clinton Portis 1 yard run (Nick Novak kick) | Redskins 21–7 |
| 2 | WSH | Santana Moss 32-yard pass from Mark Brunell (Nick Novak kick) | Redskins 28–7 |
| 2 | WSH | Mike Sellers 19-yard pass from Mark Brunell (Nick Novak kick) | Redskins 35–7 |
| 3 | WSH | Clinton Portis 1 yard run (Nick Novak kick) | Redskins 42–7 |
| 3 | WSH | Nick Novak 27-yard field goal | Redskins 45–7 |
| 4 | WSH | Rock Cartwright 4-yard run (Nick Novak kick) | Redskins 52–7 |
| 4 | SF | Joe Nedney 47-yard field goal | Redskins 52–10 |
| 4 | SF | Frank Gore 72-yard run (Joe Nedney kick) | Redskins 52–17 |

The 49ers lost for the fifth straight time after opening the season with a win when they lost in a 52–17 rout to the Redskins. San Francisco could do nothing right, with Alex Smith getting sacked five times, losing a fumble, and throwing an interception. On the other side of the ball, the Redskins quarterback Mark Brunell tossed three touchdowns and Clinton Portis rushed for three more, rolling up 448 total yards. The 49ers, who had not scored in the fourth quarter yet this season, grabbed ten points in the period. The fifth straight loss dropped the 49ers to 1–5.

==== Week 8: vs. Tampa Bay Buccaneers ====
| Team | 1 | 2 | 3 | 4 | Total |
|---|---|---|---|---|---|
| Buccaneers | 0 | 3 | 0 | 7 | 10 |
| • 49ers | 0 | 6 | 6 | 3 | 15 |

- Date: October 30
- Location: Monster Park, San Francisco, California
- Game start: 4:15 ET/1:15 PT PST
- Game weather: 66 °F or 18.9 °C (Sunny)
- TV announcers (Fox): Craig Shemon, Dale Hellestrae and Amy Gutierrez

Scoring summary
| 2 | SF | Joe Nedney 45-yard field goal | 49ers 3–0 |
| 2 | TB | Matt Bryant 47-yard field goal | Tie 3–3 |
| 2 | SF | Joe Nedney 47-yard field goal | 49ers 6–3 |
| 3 | SF | Joe Nedney 41-yard field goal | 49ers 9–3 |
| 3 | SF | Joe Nedney 46-yard field goal | 49ers 12–3 |
| 4 | TB | Joey Galloway 78-yard pass from Chris Simms (Matt Bryant kick) | 49ers 12–10 |
| 4 | SF | Joe Nedney 28-yard field goal | 49ers 15–10 |

In a game in which both starting quarterbacks were out due to injuries, field goals were the norm: the 49ers' Joe Nedney scoring five of the game's six. In a statistically unimpressive game, San Francisco toppled the Buccaneers, who, prior to the game, had the best record in the NFC. With the victory, the 49ers snapped a five-game losing streak to grab their second win of the season. Buccaneers receiver Joey Galloway caught his 500th reception of his career. The win brought the 49ers up to 2–5 on the season.

==== Week 9: vs. New York Giants ====
| Team | 1 | 2 | 3 | 4 | Total |
|---|---|---|---|---|---|
| • Giants | 3 | 7 | 0 | 14 | 24 |
| 49ers | 0 | 0 | 6 | 0 | 6 |

- Date: November 6
- Location: Monster Park, San Francisco, California
- Game start: 1:05 p.m. PST
- Game weather: 63 °F or 17.2 °C (Cloudy)
- TV announcers (Fox): Sam Rosen, Bill Maas and Chris Myers

Scoring summary
| 1 | NYG | Jay Feely 22-yard field goal | Giants 3–0 |
| 2 | NYG | Jeremy Shockey 32-yard pass from Eli Manning (Jay Feely kick) | Giants 10–0 |
| 3 | SF | Joe Nedney 48-yard field goal | Giants 10–3 |
| 3 | SF | Joe Nedney 52-yard field goal | Giants 10–6 |
| 4 | NYG | Brandon Jacobs 1 yard run (Jay Feely kick) | Giants 17–6 |
| 4 | NYG | Brandon Jacobs 1 yard run (Jay Feely kick) | Giants 24–6 |

For the second straight game, the 49ers failed to score a touchdown, this time managing only two field goals in the loss. Even while the Giants' offense struggled at times, their defense shut the 49ers down, preventing the 49ers from capitalizing on Giants' mistakes, such as allowing the 49ers four first downs on penalties. In a rare error, the 49ers only had 10 players on the field for the first play of the game, a 28-yard catch by Jeremy Shockey. The loss dropped the 49ers to 2–6.

==== Week 10: at Chicago Bears ====
| Team | 1 | 2 | 3 | 4 | Total |
|---|---|---|---|---|---|
| 49ers | 0 | 3 | 3 | 3 | 9 |
| • Bears | 0 | 7 | 0 | 10 | 17 |

- Date: November 13
- Location: Soldier Field, Chicago, Illinois
- Game start: 1:00 p.m. EST
- TV announcers (Fox): Sam Rosen, Bill Maas and Jill Carlson

Scoring summary
| 2 | SF | Joe Nedney 30-yard field goal | 49ers 3–0 |
| 2 | CHI | Nathan Vasher 108-yard field goal return (Robbie Gould kick) | Bears 7–3 |
| 3 | SF | Joe Nedney 34-yard field goal | Bears 7–6 |
| 4 | CHI | Adrian Peterson 7-yard run (Robbie Gould kick) | Bears 14–6 |
| 4 | SF | Joe Nedney 29-yard field goal | Bears 14–9 |
| 4 | CHI | Robbie Gould 37-yard field goal | Bears 17–9 |

After a scoreless first quarter, the 49ers took a three-point lead in the second quarter off a field goal by Joe Nedney. However, the game turned in the Bears' favor when Nathan Vasher ran back an attempted field goal 108 yards for a touchdown. The 49ers came within 5-point during the fourth quarter, but the high winds made it difficult to pass the ball. This, combined with a fumbled punt, doomed the 49ers to their seventh loss of the season, dropping them to 2–7.

==== Week 11: vs. Seattle Seahawks ====
| Team | 1 | 2 | 3 | 4 | Total |
|---|---|---|---|---|---|
| • Seahawks | 3 | 14 | 10 | 0 | 27 |
| 49ers | 3 | 6 | 3 | 13 | 25 |

- Date: November 20
- Location: Monster Park, San Francisco, California
- Game start: 1:05 p.m. PST
- Game weather: 68 °F or 20 °C (Sunny)
- TV announcers (Fox): Curt Menefee, J.C. Pearson and Chris Myers

In a shootout, the 49ers nearly came back from a fifteen-point deficit by scoring two touchdowns in the fourth quarter. However, the 49ers failed to score on a two-point conversion with under 30 seconds in the game that would have tied it and likely sent it into overtime. In the course of the game, the 49ers scored their first touchdown at home in sixteen quarters and also snapped a streak of 47 possessions without a touchdown. The eighth loss in nine games dropped the 49ers to 2–8.

==== Week 12: at Tennessee Titans ====
| Team | 1 | 2 | 3 | 4 | Total |
|---|---|---|---|---|---|
| 49ers | 0 | 14 | 0 | 8 | 22 |
| • Titans | 3 | 6 | 21 | 3 | 33 |

- Date: November 27
- Location: The Coliseum, Nashville, Tennessee
- Game start: 1:00 p.m. EST
- TV announcers (Fox): Ron Pitts, Tim Ryan and Maria Black

The Titans snapped a five-game losing streak and the 49ers extended theirs to four as Titans kicker Rob Bironas kicked a career-high four field goals. The Titans managed to score two touchdowns in a span of only 80 seconds. The game was not as close as the final score suggested, as the Titans forced four turnovers and Steve McNair threw for 343 yards and three touchdowns. The 49ers lost their 9th game, dooming them to a losing season.

==== Week 13: vs. Arizona Cardinals ====
| Team | 1 | 2 | 3 | 4 | Total |
|---|---|---|---|---|---|
| • Cardinals | 3 | 0 | 6 | 8 | 17 |
| 49ers | 0 | 7 | 3 | 0 | 10 |

- Date: December 4
- Location: Monster Park, San Francisco, California
- Game weather: 53 °F or 11.7 °C (Mostly Cloudy)
- TV announcers (Fox): Thom Brenneman, Tim Green and Kevin McCabe

In their fifth loss in as many games (the 49ers' second five-game losing streak), the 49ers fell to the division rival Cardinals. Although two interceptions from quarterback Kurt Warner kept the 49ers in the game, eventually the poor performance by the defense succumbed. The Cardinals took the lead for good with a 54-yard touchdown reception by Anquan Boldin in a third-and-twenty situation. Being swept by the Cardinals this season, the 49ers fell to 2–10 with the loss and they were eliminated from playoff contention for the 3rd straight year. This also marked their first home loss to the Cardinals since 1978.

==== Week 14 at Seattle Seahawks ====
| Team | 1 | 2 | 3 | 4 | Total |
|---|---|---|---|---|---|
| 49ers | 3 | 0 | 0 | 0 | 3 |
| • Seahawks | 7 | 17 | 14 | 3 | 41 |

- Date: December 11
- Location: Qwest Field, Seattle, Washington
- TV announcers (Fox): Ron Pitts, Tim Ryan and Chris Myers

The 49ers were dominated in their six straight loss as they fell to 2–11. Not only did Shaun Alexander rush for 108 yards, his ninth consecutive divisional game to rush for more than 100 yards, quarterback Matt Hasselbeck threw for four touchdowns. The 49ers' offense could not get going, managing only 113 total yards and fumbling three times. With the victory, the Seahawks completed the division perfectly, 6–0, and gained a two-game lead for home-field advantage throughout the playoffs.

==== Week 15: at Jacksonville Jaguars ====
| Team | 1 | 2 | 3 | 4 | Total |
|---|---|---|---|---|---|
| 49ers | 3 | 3 | 0 | 3 | 9 |
| • Jaguars | 0 | 7 | 0 | 3 | 10 |

- Date: December 18
- Location: Alltel Stadium, Jacksonville, Florida
- TV announcers (Fox): Curt Menefee, J.C. Pearson and Lee Gordon

In a back-and-forth game, the Jaguars emerged victorious and clinched a playoff berth at 10–4. The 49ers offense failed to score a touchdown, as they only managed three field goals by Joe Nedney. The 49ers had opportunities to take the lead, but were unable to get any first downs in the fourth quarter and a fourth down, game-ending, desperation heave from Alex Smith fell harmlessly to the ground. The 49ers fell to 2–12 with their seventh straight loss. This would be their last loss to Jacksonville until 2025.

==== Week 16: at St. Louis Rams ====
| Team | 1 | 2 | 3 | 4 | Total |
|---|---|---|---|---|---|
| • 49ers | 7 | 10 | 0 | 7 | 24 |
| Rams | 3 | 17 | 0 | 0 | 20 |

- Date: December 24
- Location: Edward Jones Dome, St. Louis, Missouri
- TV announcers (Fox): Curt Menefee, J.C. Pearson and Dan McLaughlin

The 49ers broke their seven-game losing streak with a big performance from their running backs, Maurice Hicks and Frank Gore, who combined for 177 yards and 3 touchdowns. The Rams lead for most of the game, but the 49ers scored 17 unanswered points and the defense held the Rams scoreless in the second half. The game was only decided in the final minute when Ben Emanuel intercepted a pass at the San Francisco 19-yard line.

==== Week 17: vs. Houston, Texans ====
| Team | 1 | 2 | 3 | 4 | OT | Total |
|---|---|---|---|---|---|---|
| Texans | 10 | 0 | 7 | 0 | 0 | 17 |
| • 49ers | 0 | 7 | 10 | 0 | 3 | 20 |

- Date: January 1, 2006
- Location: Monster Park, San Francisco, California
- Game start: 1:05 pt
- Game attendance: 67,970
- Game weather: Rain 59 °F or 15 °C (Cloudy)
- TV announcers (CBS): Bill Macatee and Rich Gannon

The final game of the season for the 49ers, in which the number one draft pick was on the line, was a thriller. The two teams scored back-and-forth with the lead never greater than 7 points. The game went into overtime tied at 17, and Joe Nedney kicked a 33-yard field goal for the win. This marked the only time the 49ers won two consecutive games this season. Moreover, the loss gave the Texans the first overall draft pick and moved the 49ers from second overall to sixth.

== Standings ==
NFC West
| | W | L | T | PCT | DIV | CONF | PF | PA | STK |
|---|---|---|---|---|---|---|---|---|---|
| ^{(1)} Seattle Seahawks | 13 | 3 | 0 | .813 | 6–0 | 10–2 | 452 | 271 | L1 |
| St. Louis Rams | 6 | 10 | 0 | .375 | 1–5 | 3–9 | 363 | 429 | W1 |
| Arizona Cardinals | 5 | 11 | 0 | .313 | 3–3 | 4–8 | 311 | 387 | L1 |
| San Francisco 49ers | 4 | 12 | 0 | .250 | 2–4 | 3–9 | 239 | 428 | W2 |
