= Derek Smith (linebacker) =

American football player (born 1975)

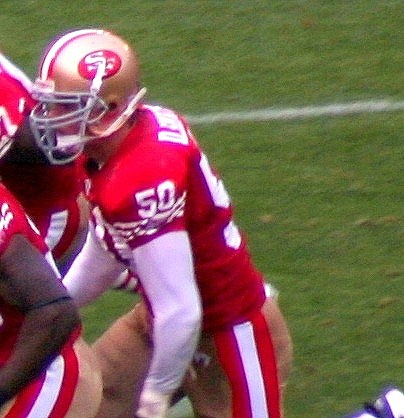

No. 50, 59, 58
- Position: Linebacker

Personal information
- Born: January 18, 1975 (age 51); American Fork, Utah, U.S.
- Listed height: 6 ft 2 in (1.88 m)
- Listed weight: 240 lb (109 kg)

Career information
- High school: American Fork
- College: Arizona State
- NFL draft: 1997: 3rd round, 80th overall pick

Career history
- Washington Redskins (1997–2000); San Francisco 49ers (2001–2007); San Diego Chargers (2008); Miami Dolphins (2008)

Awards and highlights
- Matt Hazeltine Award (2003); Bill Walsh Award (2005)

Career NFL statistics
- Tackles: 1,098
- Sacks: 13.5
- Forced fumbles: 5
- Fumble recoveries: 13
- Interceptions: 4
- Defensive touchdowns: 2
- Stats at Pro Football Reference

Derek Mecham Smith (born January 18, 1975) is an American former professional football player who was a linebacker in the National Football League (NFL). He was selected by the Washington Redskins in the third round of the 1997 NFL draft. He played college football for the Arizona State Sun Devils.

Smith also played for the San Francisco 49ers, San Diego Chargers and Miami Dolphins.

== College career ==
At Arizona State University, Smith was good friends with Pat Tillman and was a teammate to Jake Plummer.

== Professional career ==
=== Washington Redskins ===
Smith played for the Redskins for four years from 1997 to 2000.

=== San Francisco 49ers ===
Smith then signed with the San Francisco 49ers in 2001. He played with the team through 2007 before being waived on February 19, 2008.

=== San Diego Chargers ===
On February 24, 2008, the Chargers signed Smith to a two-year contract. He was released ten weeks into the regular season on November 12 after running back Michael Bennett was claimed off waivers.

=== Miami Dolphins ===
Smith was signed by the Miami Dolphins on December 22, 2008.

== NFL career statistics ==
Legend
**Bold**	Career high

=== Regular season ===
Year	Team	Games		Tackles				Interceptions				Fumbles			
Year	Team	GP	GS	Comb	Solo	Ast	Sck	Int	Yds	TD	Lng	FF	FR	Yds	TD
1997	WAS	16	16	87	59	28	2.0	0	0	0	0	0	**2**	5	0
1998	WAS	16	15	103	78	25	0.5	0	0	0	0	**1**	1	0	0
1999	WAS	16	16	97	68	29	1.0	**1**	0	0	0	0	1	0	0
2000	WAS	16	14	89	72	17	1.0	0	0	0	0	**1**	1	0	0
2001	SFO	14	14	108	78	**30**	3.0	**1**	0	0	0	0	**2**	3	0
2002	SFO	16	16	113	84	29	1.0	0	0	0	0	**1**	1	0	0
2003	SFO	16	16	115	88	27	**3.5**	0	0	0	0	**1**	1	7	0
2004	SFO	14	14	110	80	**30**	1.5	0	0	0	0	0	**2**	**46**	**1**
2005	SFO	16	16	**116**	**90**	26	0.0	**1**	**13**	0	**13**	0	1	0	**1**
2006	SFO	13	12	69	51	18	0.0	0	0	0	0	**1**	0	0	0
2007	SFO	15	14	78	50	28	0.0	**1**	4	0	4	0	1	-1	0
2008	SDG	5	4	13	7	6	0.0	0	0	0	0	0	0	0	0
2008	MIA	1	0	0	0	0	0.0	0	0	0	0	0	0	0	0
		174	167	1,098	805	293	13.5	4	17	0	13	5	13	60	2

=== Playoffs ===
Year	Team	Games		Tackles				Interceptions				Fumbles			
Year	Team	GP	GS	Comb	Solo	Ast	Sck	Int	Yds	TD	Lng	FF	FR	Yds	TD
1999	WAS	2	2	14	8	6	0.0	0	0	0	0	0	0	0	0
2001	SFO	1	1	4	3	1	0.0	0	0	0	0	0	0	0	0
2002	SFO	2	2	**24**	**17**	**7**	0.0	0	0	0	0	0	0	0	0
2008	MIA	1	0	0	0	0	0.0	0	0	0	0	0	0	0	0
		6	5	42	28	14	0.0	0	0	0	0	0	0	0	0
