= Ben Steele =

American football player and coach (born 1978)

Personal information
- Born: May 27, 1978 (age 48); Denver, Colorado, U.S.
- Listed height: 6 ft 5 in (1.96 m)
- Listed weight: 250 lb (113 kg)

Career information
- Position: Tight end (No. 82)
- High school: Palisade (Palisade, Colorado)
- College: Fort Lewis (1996–1998); Mesa State (1999–2000)
- NFL draft: 2001: undrafted

Career history

Playing
- San Francisco 49ers (2001–2002)*; Oakland Raiders (2002–2003)*; Seattle Seahawks (2003)*; Frankfurt Galaxy (2003); Minnesota Vikings (2003–2004)*; Green Bay Packers (2004–2005); Houston Texans (2006)
- * Offseason or practice squad member only

Coaching
- Colorado Mesa Mavericks (2008) Offensive assistant; Colorado Buffaloes (2009–2010); Operations & recruiting assistant (2009); Graduate assistant (2010); California Golden Bears (2011–2012) Offensive administrative assistant; UC Davis Aggies (2013) Tight ends coach & recruiting coordinator; Tampa Bay Buccaneers (2014–2018); Offensive quality control coach (2014–2016); Tight ends coach (2017–2018); Atlanta Falcons (2019–2020); Offensive assistant (2019); Tight ends coach (2020); Minnesota Vikings (2021) Assistant offensive line coach; Denver Broncos (2022) Assistant offensive line coach; Arizona Cardinals (2023–2025) Tight ends coach; Washington Commanders (2026)* Tight ends coach

Career NFL statistics
- Receptions: 4
- Receiving yards: 42
- Stats at Pro Football Reference

Benjamin Joseph Steele (born May 27, 1978) is an American professional football coach and former tight end. Steele played college football for the Fort Lewis Skyhawks and Mesa State and played and later coached for several NFL teams.

== Playing career ==
Pre-draft measurables
Height	Weight	40-yard dash	10-yard split	20-yard split	Vertical jump	Bench press
6 ft 4 1/4 in (1.94 m)	230 lb (104 kg)	4.80 s	1.65 s	2.76 s	33.0 in (0.84 m)	18 reps
All values from Pro Day

Steele played professionally from 2001–2007 after coming into the NFL as an undrafted free agent. He spent his career with the San Francisco 49ers, Oakland Raiders, Minnesota Vikings, Seattle Seahawks, Green Bay Packers, and the Houston Texans. He played only with the Packers during a regular season, catching four passes in 15 games in 2004 and no passes in two games in 2005.

== Coaching career ==
Steele joined the Atlanta Falcons as an offensive assistant in 2019 after spending the previous five seasons with the Tampa Bay Buccaneers. From 2017–2018, Steele was the Buccaneers' tight ends coach. On February 5, 2020, Steele was promoted by the Falcons becoming their tight ends coach. After being hired to be an analyst for Auburn, on July 23, 2021, Steele was instead hired to be the assistant offensive line coach for the Minnesota Vikings.

On February 14, 2022, the Denver Broncos hired Steele as their assistant offensive line coach. Steele was not retained by the Broncos for 2023 after Sean Payton was hired as head coach. On February 22, 2023, the Arizona Cardinals hired Steele as their tight ends coach. He joined the Washington Commanders as their tight ends coach in 2026 but was fired before training camp due to an arrest for driving while intoxicated that June.
