= Eric Johnson (tight end) =

American football player (born 1979)

No. 82
- Position: Tight end

Personal information
- Born: September 15, 1979 (age 47); Needham, Massachusetts, U.S.
- Listed height: 6 ft 3 in (1.91 m)
- Listed weight: 252 lb (114 kg)

Career information
- High school: Needham
- College: Yale (1997–2000)
- NFL draft: 2001: 7th round, 224th overall pick

Career history
- San Francisco 49ers (2001–2006); New Orleans Saints (2007)

Awards and highlights
- Nils V. "Swede" Nelson Award (2000)

Career NFL statistics
- Receptions: 240
- Receiving yards: 2,178
- Receiving touchdowns: 9
- Stats at Pro Football Reference

Eric Maxwell Johnson (born September 15, 1979) is an American former professional football player who was a tight end in the National Football League (NFL). He was selected by the San Francisco 49ers in the seventh round of the 2001 NFL draft. He played college football at Yale.

== Early life and college ==
Johnson was born in Needham, Massachusetts. He attended Needham High School and Belmont Hill School in Massachusetts. He went on to Yale University, where he played wide receiver. He caught 21 receptions for 244 yards in Yale's come-from-behind victory against Harvard in the 1999 Harvard–Yale Game, including the game-winning touchdown catch.

== Professional career ==
Pre-draft measurables
Height	Weight
6 ft 1 5/8 in (1.87 m)	233 lb (106 kg)
Values from Pro Day

Johnson was selected by the San Francisco 49ers in the seventh round of the 2001 NFL draft. When healthy, he was a contributor to the 49ers passing game. However, he missed all of 2003 with an injury and missed all of 2005 with an injury as well. In 2004, he led the 49ers in receiving with 82 catches for 825 yards and two touchdowns. During the 2006 season, Johnson split time with tight end Vernon Davis, the team's first-round draft pick.

Johnson signed a one-year contract with the New Orleans Saints in 2007. He was re-signed by the team on March 14, 2008. On July 31, 2008, the Saints released him.

== NFL career statistics ==
Legend
**Bold**	Career high

=== Regular season ===
Year	Team	Games		Receiving					
Year	Team	GP	GS	Tgt	Rec	Yds	Avg	Lng	TD
2001	SFO	**16**	**14**	64	40	362	9.1	24	**3**
2002	SFO	12	10	65	36	321	8.9	**38**	0
2004	SFO	**16**	**14**	**117**	**82**	**825**	**10.1**	25	2
2006	SFO	13	9	49	34	292	8.6	26	2
2007	NOR	14	12	63	48	378	7.9	22	2
		71	59	358	240	2,178	9.1	38	9

=== Playoffs ===
Year	Team	Games		Receiving					
Year	Team	GP	GS	Tgt	Rec	Yds	Avg	Lng	TD
2001	SFO	1	1	5	4	36	**9.0**	13	0
2002	SFO	**2**	**2**	**16**	**10**	**85**	8.5	**25**	0
		3	3	21	14	121	8.6	25	0

== Personal life ==
Johnson was married to stylist Keri Johnson, whom he divorced in 2010. He began dating singer and actress Jessica Simpson in January 2010. They announced their engagement that November. The couple married on July 5, 2014, at the San Ysidro Ranch, in Montecito, Santa Barbara County, California. They have three children. In January 2025, Simpson revealed to People that she and Johnson had separated earlier that month.
