= Frank Strong (American football) =

American football player (born 1980)

No. 58
- Position: Linebacker

Personal information
- Born: January 14, 1980 (age 46); Stockton, California, U.S.
- Listed height: 6 ft 1 in (1.85 m)
- Listed weight: 232 lb (105 kg)

Career information
- High school: Franklin (Garden Acres, California)
- College: USC (1998–2001)
- NFL draft: 2002: undrafted

Career history
- San Francisco 49ers (2002–2003); San Diego Chargers (2005)*
- * Offseason or practice squad member only

Career NFL statistics
- Games played: 6
- Tackles: 5
- Stats at Pro Football Reference

Frank Leandrea Strong (born January 14, 1980) is an American former professional football linebacker who played for the San Francisco 49ers of the National Football League (NFL). He played college football for the USC Trojans.

== Early life ==
Strong was born on January 14, 1980, in Stockton, California. He attended Franklin High School in Garden Acres, California. Strong had 1,460 rushing yards and 39 touchdowns as a senior, earning All-American honors from USA Today and Prep Star.

== College career ==
Strong played college football for the USC Trojans from 1998 to 2001 and was a four-year letterman. He started at running back his first two seasons before he transitioned to defensive back. In 41 games, Strong had 226 rushing yards, six receptions for 56 yards and 642 return yards. On defense he had two interceptions.

== Professional career ==
=== San Francisco 49ers ===
After going undrafted in the 2002 NFL draft, Strong signed with the San Francisco 49ers as an undrafted free agent. He made the 53-man roster and played in the first six games of the 2002 season, recording five tackles. On October 25, he was placed on season-ending injured reserve to set a dislocated shoulder. On July 25, 2003, he was released by the team with an injury settlement.

=== San Diego Chargers ===
On August 16, 2005, Strong signed with the San Diego Chargers. On August 29, he was waived.
