= Jasen Isom =

American football player (born 1977)

No. 41
- Position: Fullback

Personal information
- Born: January 7, 1977 (age 49); Wheatley Heights, New York
- Listed height: 6 ft 0 in (1.83 m)
- Listed weight: 243 lb (110 kg)

Career information
- High school: Half Hollow Hills West
- College: Western Illinois
- NFL draft: 2001: undrafted

Career history
- San Francisco 49ers (2001–2004)
- Stats at Pro Football Reference

Jasen J. Isom (born January 7, 1977) is an American former professional football fullback who played for the San Francisco 49ers of National Football League (NFL). He played college football at Western Illinois University.
