= Alex Lincoln =

American football player (born 1977)

Profile
- Position: Linebacker

Personal information
- Born: November 17, 1977 (age 48); Meridian, Mississippi, U.S.
- Listed height: 6 ft 0 in (1.83 m)
- Listed weight: 250 lb (113 kg)

Career information
- High school: Murphy (Mobile, Alabama)
- College: Auburn
- NFL draft: 2001: 7th round, 209th overall pick

Career history
- 2001–2002: San Francisco 49ers

Awards and highlights
- Second-team All-SEC (2000)

Alexander Lincoln (born November 17, 1977) is an American former professional football linebacker for the San Francisco 49ers in the National Football League (NFL).

Lincoln attended Murphy High School in Mobile, Alabama. Lincoln later played college football for Auburn University, where he was roommates with Heath Evans, a fullback on the 2007 New England Patriots. He was selected 209th overall in the seventh round in the 2001 NFL draft. Mel Kiper Jr. had noted Lincoln in his list of top inside linebackers available in the draft.

Lincoln is general manager of Athletes' Performance Florida, located in Gulf Breeze, FL, on the Baptist Healthcare campus adjoining the Andrews Institute of orthopaedic surgeon James Andrews.
