= Rashad Holman =

American football player (born 1978)

No. 26
- Position: Cornerback

Personal information
- Born: January 17, 1978 (age 48); Louisville, Kentucky, U.S.
- Listed height: 5 ft 11 in (1.80 m)
- Listed weight: 191 lb (87 kg)

Career information
- High school: Louisville Male
- College: Louisville
- NFL draft: 2001: 6th round, 179th overall pick

Career history
- San Francisco 49ers (2001–2003); Baltimore Ravens (2004)*
- * Offseason or practice squad member only

Career NFL statistics
- Games played - started: 46 - 1
- Tackles: 75
- Interceptions: 2
- Stats at Pro Football Reference

Rashad Holman (born January 17, 1978) is an American former professional football player who was a cornerback in the National Football League (NFL). He played three seasons for the San Francisco 49ers. He played college football for the Louisville Cardinals and was selected in the sixth round of the 2001 NFL draft.
