= Derrick Hamilton =

American gridiron football player (born 1981)

No. 88
- Position: Wide receiver

Personal information
- Born: November 30, 1981 (age 44); Dillon, South Carolina, U.S.
- Listed height: 6 ft 4 in (1.93 m)
- Listed weight: 207 lb (94 kg)

Career information
- High school: Dillon (SC)
- College: Clemson
- NFL draft: 2004: 3rd round, 77th overall pick

Career history
- San Francisco 49ers (2004–2005); Atlanta Falcons (2007)*; Tampa Bay Buccaneers (2007)*; Houston Texans (2007)*; Denver Broncos (2008)*; Toronto Argonauts (2009)*
- * Offseason or practice squad member only

Awards and highlights
- Second-team All-ACC (2003); Second-team SN Freshman All-American (2001)
- Stats at Pro Football Reference
- Stats at CFL.ca (archive)

Derrick T. Hamilton (born November 30, 1981) is an American former professional football player who was a wide receiver in the National Football League (NFL). He was selected by the San Francisco 49ers in the third round of the 2004 NFL draft. He played college football for the Clemson Tigers.

Hamilton was also a member of the Atlanta Falcons, Tampa Bay Buccaneers, Houston Texans, Denver Broncos and Toronto Argonauts.

== Early life ==
Hamilton played his high school football at Dillon High School. His senior season in high school, Hamilton had more interceptions returned for touchdowns than receptions returned for touchdowns. His high school career totals were 36 catches for 745 yds and 9 touchdowns. This was mainly because his high school team mostly ran the ball. He had eight kickoffs returned for scores (plus eight more returned for touchdowns that were called back for penalties), and eight INT's with 3 returned for scores.

== Professional career ==
=== San Francisco 49ers ===
Hamilton never caught a pass in his time with the 49ers and played in only the final two games of his rookie season (2004). Hamilton tore a ligament in his left knee during a summer workout and did not play a down in his second year in the NFL (2005).

While supposedly nursing his damaged knee, Hamilton did not participate in summer training activities. Early in training camp, Hamilton injured his hamstring and barely participated in workouts.

On August 11, of the 2006 San Francisco 49ers season, Hamilton was waived without ever catching a single pass.

=== Atlanta Falcons ===
After being signed by the Atlanta Falcons on March 15, 2007, he was waived on June 12, 2007.

=== Tampa Bay Buccaneers ===
On October 24, 2007, Hamilton was signed to the practice squad of the Tampa Bay Buccaneers following a season-ending injury to wide receiver Mark Jones. Hamilton was released a week later.

=== Houston Texans ===
On November 21, 2007, Hamilton was signed to the Houston Texans' practice squad and remained there through the end of the 2007 season before becoming a free agent.

=== Denver Broncos ===
On February 11, 2008, Hamilton was signed by the Denver Broncos. He was waived on April 15, just one day after the team added receiver Samie Parker.

=== Toronto Argonauts ===
On January 29, 2009, Hamilton was signed by the Toronto Argonauts. He was released on June 7, 2009.
