= Ronnie Heard =

American football player (born 1976)

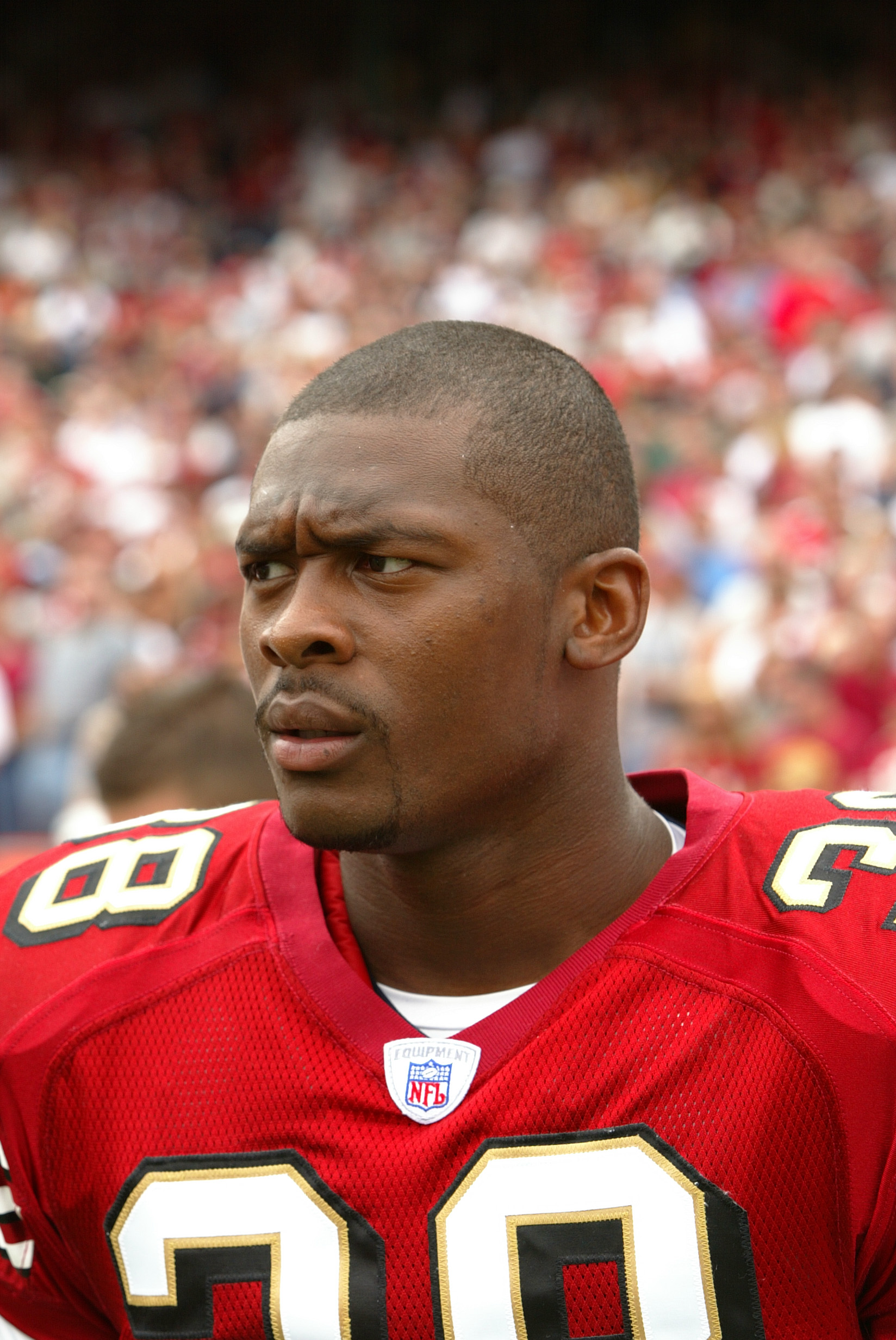
- Heard with the San Francisco 49ers

No. 38
- Position: Safety

Personal information
- Born: October 5, 1976 (age 50); Bay City, Texas, U.S.
- Listed height: 6 ft 3 in (1.91 m)
- Listed weight: 215 lb (98 kg)

Career information
- College: Ole Miss
- NFL draft: 2000: undrafted

Career history
- San Francisco 49ers (2000–2004); Atlanta Falcons (2005)

Career NFL statistics
- Tackles: 211
- Interceptions: 6
- Sacks: 3.5
- Stats at Pro Football Reference

Ronnie Heard (born October 5, 1976) is an American former professional football player who was a safety in the National Football League (NFL). He played college football for the Ole Miss Rebels and was signed by the San Francisco 49ers as an undrafted free agent in 2000.

Heard also played for the Atlanta Falcons.

== Professional career ==
=== San Francisco 49ers ===
Heard signed with the San Francisco 49ers as an undrafted free agent in 2000. He played for the 49ers from 2000 to 2004. In his five years with the team he started 24 of 69 games, recording 182 tackles, 3.5 sacks, and six interceptions.

=== Atlanta Falcons ===
Heard spent one year with the Atlanta Falcons in 2005 after signing with them as an unrestricted free agent. In his only year with the team, he started 5 of 12 games and made 29 tackles.

== Personal ==
Heard and his wife, LaToya have three children; two girls (Kaitlyn and Parker) and one son (Reid). Both are alumni of the University of Mississippi (Ole Miss), and have been married since A
