= 1998 San Francisco 49ers season =

American football team season

- Owner: Edward J. DeBartolo Jr.
- General manager: John McVay and Dwight Clark
- Head coach: Steve Mariucci
- Home stadium: 3Com Park

Results
- Record: 12–4
- Division place: 2nd NFC West
- Playoffs: Won Wild Card Playoffs (vs. Packers) 30–27; Lost Divisional Playoffs (at Falcons) 18–20
- Pro Bowlers: G Kevin Gogan; QB Steve Young; WR Jerry Rice; RB Garrison Hearst; MLB Winfred Tubbs

Uniform
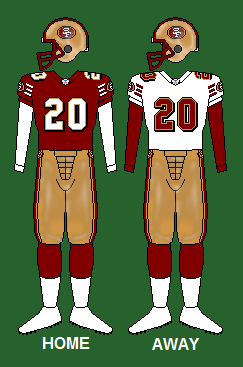

The 1998 San Francisco 49ers season was the franchise's 49th season in the National Football League (NFL) and their 53rd overall. The 49ers were heavily favored to represent the NFC in Super Bowl XXXIII.

The season saw the return of Jerry Rice, who missed most of 1997 with a major knee injury.

After defeating the Green Bay Packers in the wild-card round of the playoffs, thanks to young Terrell Owens's game-winning catch, referred to by fans as "The Catch II", San Francisco's season ended with a loss to the Atlanta Falcons the following week in the divisional round. The Falcons went on to defeat the 15–1 Minnesota Vikings in the NFC title game but lost to the Denver Broncos in the Super Bowl.

1998 would prove to be the final full season of Steve Young's career. In Week 3 of the following season, Young suffered a concussion on a violent sack by Cardinals cornerback Aeneas Williams which ultimately ended his 15-year NFL career. Also in the divisional-round game, 49ers running back Garrison Hearst broke his foot, keeping him out of football for the next two seasons. Hearst was the first NFL player to be on the cover of Madden NFL, and his injury marked the beginning of the Madden curse.

== Offseason ==
Additions	Subtractions
QB Ty Detmer (Eagles)	DE Kevin Greene (Panthers)
P Reggie Roby (Oilers)	CB Rod Woodson (Ravens)
CB Antonio Langham (Ravens)	K Gary Anderson (Vikings)
	C Jesse Sapolu (Retried)
	LB Jim Schwantz (Bears)
	TE Brent Jones (Retried)

=== NFL draft ===
1998 San Francisco 49ers draft
Round	Pick	Player	Position	College	Notes
1	28	R. W. McQuarters	Cornerback	Oklahoma State	
2	58	Jeremy Newberry *	Center	California	
3	89	Chris Ruhman	Tackle	Texas A&M	
4	119	Lance Schulters *	Safety	Hofstra	
5	151	Phil Ostrowski	Guard	Penn State	
6	180	Fred Beasley *	Fullback	Auburn	
7	215	Ryan Thelwell	Wide receiver	Minnesota	
Made roster * Made at least one Pro Bowl during career

=== Undrafted free agents ===
1998 undrafted free agents of note
Player	Position	College
Tony Blevins	Cornerback	Kansas
Thad Busby	Quarterback	Florida State
Andy Clifton	Linebacker	Rice
Dan Finn	Guard	Northern Arizona
Jim Nelson	Linebacker	Penn State
Brock Olivo	Fullback	Missouri
Pepe Pearson	Running back	Ohio State

== Personnel ==
=== Staff ===
1998 San Francisco 49ers staff
Front office: Owner – Edward J. DeBartolo, Jr.; President – Carmen Policy; Vice-president/Director of Football Operations – Dwight Clark; Director of player personnel – Vinny Cerrato; Head coaches: Head coach – Steve Mariucci; Assistant head coach – Bill McPherson; Offensive coaches: Offensive coordinator/quarterbacks – Marty Mornhinweg; Assistant quarterbacks – Greg Knapp; Running backs – Tom Rathman; Wide receivers – Larry Kirksey; Tight ends/assistant offensive line – Patrick Morris; Offensive line – Bobb McKittrick; Offensive quality control – Andy Sugarman	Defensive coaches: Defensive coordinator – John Marshall; Defensive line – Dwaine Board; Linebackers – Richard Smith; Defensive backs – Jim Mora; Defensive secondary/strength development coordinator – Michael Barnes; Defensive quality control – Jaime Hill; Special teams coaches: Special teams Coordinator – George Stewart; Strength and conditioning: Physical development coordinator – Jerry Attaway

=== Roster ===
1998 San Francisco 49ers roster
Quarterbacks (QB): 11 Ty Detmer; 14 Jim Druckenmiller; 8 Steve Young; Running backs (RB): 40 Fred Beasley FB; 44 Marc Edwards FB; 20 Garrison Hearst; 41 Terry Kirby; 32 Chuck Levy; Wide receivers (WR): 88 Mark Harris; 81 Terrell Owens; 80 Jerry Rice; 83 J. J. Stokes; Tight ends (TE): 85 Greg Clark; 86 Chad Fann; 82 Irv Smith	Offensive linemen (OL): 72 Jamie Brown T; 65 Ray Brown G; 67 Chris Dalman C; 63 Derrick Deese T; 74 Dave Fiore T; 66 Kevin Gogan G; 64 Steve Gordon C; 77 Tim Hanshaw G; 62 Jeremy Newberry C; 69 Phil Ostrowski G; 71 Chris Ruhman T; 76 Kirk Scrafford T; Defensive linemen (DL): 92 Roy Barker DE; 78 Shane Bonham DT; 90 Junior Bryant DT; 99 Brentson Buckner DT; 56 Chris Doleman DE; 96 Jeff Posey DE; 94 David Richie DT; 98 Gabe Wilkins DT	Linebackers (LB): 59 Reggie Givens OLB; 51 Ken Norton Jr. OLB; 50 Tony Peterson OLB; 55 Winfred Tubbs MLB; 53 James Williams MLB; 54 Lee Woodall OLB; Defensive backs (DB): 31 Zack Bronson FS; 36 Merton Hanks FS; 43 Antonio Langham CB; 45 Tyrone Legette CB; 46 Tim McDonald SS; 21 R. W. McQuarters CB; 23 Marquez Pope CB; 30 Lance Schulters SS; 38 Darnell Walker CB; Special teams (ST): 57 Randy Kirk LS; 7 Wade Richey K; 4 Reggie Roby P	Practice squad: 93 Brandon Noble DT; 91 Angel Rubio DT; 58 Vernon Strickland LB; Reserve: 79 Harris Barton T (IR); 75 Frank Pollack T (PUP); 97 Bryant Young DT (IR); 53 active, 3 inactive, 3 practice squad Rookies in italics

== Preseason ==
Week	Date	Opponent	Result	Record	Venue
1	August 2	New England Patriots	W 14–13	1–0	3Com Park
2	August 8	at San Diego Chargers	L 21–27	1–1	Qualcomm Stadium
3	August 15	vs. Seattle Seahawks	W 24–21	2–1	B.C. Place Stadium
4	August 23	Miami Dolphins	L 20–21	2–2	3Com Park
5	August 28	at Seattle Seahawks	L 20–21	2–3	Kingdome

== Regular season ==
=== Schedule ===
Week	Date	Opponent	Result	Record	Venue	Attendance
1	September 6	New York Jets	**W** 36–30 (OT)	1–0	3Com Park	64,419
2	September 14	at Washington Redskins	**W** 45–10	2–0	Jack Kent Cooke Stadium	76,798
3	Bye					
4	September 27	**Atlanta Falcons**	**W** 31–20	3–0	3Com Park	62,296
5	October 4	at Buffalo Bills	**L** 21–26	3–1	Ralph Wilson Stadium	76,615
6	October 11	at **New Orleans Saints**	**W** 31–0	4–1	Louisiana Superdome	62,811
7	October 18	Indianapolis Colts	**W** 34–31	5–1	3Com Park	68,486
8	October 25	at **St. Louis Rams**	**W** 28–10	6–1	Trans World Dome	58,563
9	November 1	at Green Bay Packers	**L** 22–36	6–2	Lambeau Field	59,794
10	November 8	**Carolina Panthers**	**W** 25–23	7–2	3Com Park	68,572
11	November 15	at **Atlanta Falcons**	**L** 19–31	7–3	Georgia Dome	69,828
12	November 22	**New Orleans Saints**	**W** 31–20	8–3	3Com Park	68,429
13	November 30	New York Giants	**W** 31–7	9–3	3Com Park	68,212
14	December 6	at **Carolina Panthers**	**W** 31–28 (OT)	10–3	Ericcson Stadium	63,332
15	December 14	Detroit Lions	**W** 35–13	11–3	3Com Park	68,585
16	December 20	at New England Patriots	**L** 21–24	11–4	Foxboro Stadium	59,153
17	December 27	**St. Louis Rams**	**W** 38–19	12–4	3Com Park	68,386
Note: Intra-division opponents are in **bold** text.

=== Game summaries ===
==== Week 1 vs. Jets ====
Week One: New York Jets (0–0) at San Francisco 49ers (0–0)

Quarter	1	2	3	4	OT	Total
Jets	3	14	7	6	0	**30**
**49ers**	7	7	9	7	6	**36**

at 3Com Park, San Francisco, California

- Date: September 6, 1998
- Game time: 4:15 p.m. EST
- Game weather: Sunny • 71 °F (22 °C) • Wind 14 miles per hour (23 km/h; 12 kn)
- Game attendance: 64,419
- Referee: Bernie Kukar
- TV announcers (CBS): Greg Gumbel, Phil Simms, and Armen Keteyian
- FootballDB.com, Pro-Football-Reference.com

Game information

**First quarter**

- NYJ – John Hall 34-yard field goal, 11:34. Jets 3–0. **Drive: 5 plays, 21 yards, 1:49.**
- SF – Garrison Hearst 5-yard run (Wade Richey kick), 3:31. 49ers 7–3. **Drive: 8 plays, 84 yards, 3:52.**

**Second quarter**

- NYJ – Keyshawn Johnson 41-yard pass from Glenn Foley (John Hall kick), 10:11. Jets 10–7. **Drive: 7 plays, 63 yards, 3:34.**
- SF – J.J. Stokes 6 yard pass from Steve Young (Wade Richey kick), 2:11. 49ers 14–10. **Drive: 7 plays, 63 yards, 3:05.**
- NYJ – Wayne Chrebet 6-yard pass from Glenn Foley (John Hall kick), 0:33. Jets 17–14. **Drive: 5 plays, 60 yards, 1:38.**

**Third quarter**

- SF – Wade Richey 22-yard field goal, 9:05. Tie 17–17. **Drive: 7 plays, 38 yards, 2:51.**
- NYJ – Keyshawn Johnson 21-yard pass from Glenn Foley (John Hall kick), 7:15. Jets 24–17. **Drive: 4 plays, 78 yards, 1:50.**
- SF – Jerry Rice 14-yard pass from Steve Young (kick blocked), 3:03. Jets 24–23. **Drive: 7 plays, 68 yards, 4:12.**

**Fourth quarter**

- NYJ – John Hall 32-yard field goal, 3:28. Jets 27–23. **Drive: 9 plays, 66 yards, 4:34.**
- SF – J.J. Stokes 31-yard pass from Steve Young (Wade Richey kick), 1:26. 49ers 30–27. **Drive: 5 plays, 76 yards, 2:12.**
- NYJ – John Hall 31-yard field goal, 0:00. Tie 30–30. **Drive: 12 plays, 60 yards, 1:26.**

**Overtime**

- SF – Garrison Hearst 96-yard run, 10:52. 49ers 36–30. **Drive: 1 play, 96 yards, 0:17.**

Top passers

- NYJ – Glenn Foley – 30/58, 415 yards, 3 TD, INT
- SF – Steve Young – 26/46, 363 yards, 3 TD, INT

Top rushers

- NYJ – Curtis Martin – 22 rushes, 58 yards
- SF – Garrison Hearst – 20 rushes, 187 yards, 2 TD

Top receivers

- NYJ – Keyshawn Johnson – 9 receptions, 126 yards, 2 TD
- SF – J.J. Stokes – 7 receptions, 111 yards, 2 TD

The game lead tied or changed eight times in regulation as the Jets under Bill Parcells came to Candlestick Park. Jets quarterback Glenn Foley matched Steve Young's three touchdowns and one pick with three scores and one pick of his own; Foley put up 415 yards to Young's 363 yards. The two teams traded punts in overtime; the Niners had to start at their four-yard line and coach Steve Mariucci called "90 O", a run play intended to get away from their endzone. Garrison Hearst burst through a hole and raced 96 yards straddling the sideline, getting key blocks from Dave Fiore despite an injured leg, and from Terrell Owens for the touchdown and a 36–30 Niners win.

==== Week 2: at Washington Redskins ====
The Niners defeated the Redskins 45–10 with 504 yards of offense and three touchdowns by Steve Young. The Redskins coughed up the ball three times in the loss.

==== Week 3: Bye ====
Bye week

==== Week 4: vs. Atlanta Falcons ====
Hosting the 2–1 Falcons, the Niners picked off Chris Chandler three times and won 31–20 behind 387 passing yards, 50 rushing yards, and three touchdowns from Steve Young. |Weather= 62 °F or 16.7 °C (Light Rain)

==== Week 5: at Buffalo Bills ====
The Niners traveled to Rich Stadium to face the Bills and crashed hard 26–21 despite 21 fourth-quarter points. The Niners committed 22 penalties eating up 178 yards (compared to Buffalo's 12 fouls for 106), while the two teams' punters Chris Mohr and Reggie Roby combined for 323 punting yards.

==== Week 6: at New Orleans Saints ====
Still smarting from their poor performance at Buffalo, the Niners traveled to the Superdome and crushed Mike Ditka's Saints 31–0. The game was another penalty-laden affair with a combined 24 fouls eating up 240 yards. The Niners shut down Danny Wuerffel and Billy Joe Tolliver, limiting them to 15 completions for 174 yards and a pick. While quarterback Steve Young got a win on his 37th birthday.

==== Week 7: vs Indianapolis Colts ====
The Niners hosted the Colts and their new quarterback Peyton Manning. The Colts immediately served notice for the future as they raced to a 21–0 lead behind two Manning scores to Marvin Harrison and a 65-yard score from future Ram Marshall Faulk; Manning would add another touchdown to Harrison in the third quarter and the Colts added a field goal following a Garrison Hearst fumble and subsequent personal foul penalty. The Niners clawed back as Steve Young threw three touchdowns and ran in a fourth; a botched PAT by Ty Detmer and resultant smothered two-point attempt led on the Niners' next possession to a Jerry Rice two-point conversion catch from Young to tie the game. Mike Vanderjagt missed from 53 yards out on the Colts' next possession with 1:10 to go, then after a crushing pass interference penalty on Tyrone Poole against J.J. Stokes with 43 seconds to go (this following two Young interceptions erased on Indianapolis holding penalties in the first half) Wade Richey's 24-yard field goal won it 34–31 for the Niners. The game became notable in league history for the showdown between veteran Young (331 passing yards, 60 rushing yards nearly matching Garrison Hearst at 65, and four total touchdowns) and rookie phenomenon Manning (231 passing yards and three scores); the game featured eight Hall of Famers in Young, Manning, Jerry Rice, Marvin Harrison, Bryant Young, Marshall Faulk, Terrell Owens, and Chris Doleman. |Weather=68 °F or 20 °C (Sunny)

==== Week 8: at St. Louis Rams ====
Hitting the TWA Dome, the Niners cruised to a 28–10 win over the Rams as Steve Young overcame two picks with three touchdowns and budding superstar Terrell Owens ran in a 21-yard score. The Niners picked off Tony Banks three times.

==== Week 9: at Green Bay Packers ====
For the fifth straight time the Niners fell to the Green Bay Packers, this time 36–22 at Lambeau Field. The Niners overcame a botched punt snap for safety and erased a 16–0 Packer lead to take the lead 22–19 in the third quarter. From there, despite three Brett Favre interceptions, it all fell apart for the Niners as the Packers unleashed 17 unanswered points.

==== Week 10: vs. Carolina Panthers ====
Ty Detmer took over for Steve Young against the 1–7 Panthers, throwing for 276 yards and three touchdowns (to J.J. Stokes and Terrell Owens), but three interceptions kept the Panthers in the game and they took a 23–22 lead before Wade Richey's 46-yard field goal capped a 25–23 Niners win. |Weather=57 °F or 13.9 °C (Cloudy)

==== Week 11: at Atlanta Falcons ====
The battle for the NFC West became a true battle as the 7–2 Falcons hosted the 7–2 Niners and things got ugly for San Francisco. Steve Young managed 342 passing yards but only 21 completions; the Falcons grabbed a fumble at the Niners goal line for a Jessie Tuggle touchdown and when Young connected on long-range scores to Terrell Owens and Jerry Rice, Chris Chandler put the game away on his 78-yard strike to Terance Mathis. The 31–19 Falcons win marked the end of the Niners' hold on the division crown that season.

==== Week 12: vs. New Orleans Saints ====
Steve Young outdueled ex-Panther Kerry Collins despite a Collins rushing score that put the 5–6 Saints up 10–0 in the first quarter. The Niners outscored the Saints 31–10 in the second and third quarters on four Young touchdown throws. Collins was picked twice and failed on fourth and goal at the Niners' 1-yard line in the fourth quarter; an Aaron Craver rushing score in the final two minutes put the Saints within eleven points at the end.

==== Week 13: vs. New York Giants ====
A Gary Brown rushing score in the opening six minutes of the first quarter was the only time the Giants were in contention as Steve Young answered with a 79-yard touchdown to Terrell Owens. Young scored again at the end of the second quarter and Terry Kirby and Garrison Hearst ran in the ball for additional scores and 31–7 Niners win.

==== Week 16: at New England Patriots ====
Following four straight wins the Niners traveled to Foxboro Stadium to face a struggling Patriots squad. Regular starter Drew Bledsoe was out for the year with a broken throwing hand so backup Scott Zolak took over. Despite a blocked field goal attempt the Niners scored 21 second-quarter points (including a touchdown from backup Ty Detmer on a fake field goal attempt), but the Patriots battled back and tied the game on a Robert Edwards four-yard score, then won it on a drive in the final 1:48 on four straight Edwards rushes and then on Adam Vinatieri's 35-yard field goal with eighteen seconds left. Terrell Owens was held to three catches for 61 yards; in the second quarter the two teams exchanged interceptions as a pass for Owens was intercepted by Ty Law but three plays later a Zolak pass to Ben Coates was intercepted by Tim McDonald.

==== Week 17 vs. St. Louis Rams ====
Former Niner Steve Bono put the Rams, winless against the Niners since 1990, up 7–0 on a touchdown to Ricky Proehl. Proehl would catch another touchdown but by then the game was out of reach on two Steve Young touchdowns and scores from R. W. McQuarters and three Wade Richey field goals. Notably, this was the first game in which former Arena Football quarterback, Kurt Warner, saw playing time in the NFL, completing four of eleven passes for 39 yards. This would be the last time the 49ers would sweep the rams in the regular season until 2005.

=== Standings ===
NFC West
	W	L	T	PCT	PF	PA	STK
^{(2)} Atlanta Falcons	14	2	0	.875	442	289	W9
^{(4)} San Francisco 49ers	12	4	0	.750	479	328	W1
New Orleans Saints	6	10	0	.375	305	359	L3
Carolina Panthers	4	12	0	.250	336	413	W2
St. Louis Rams	4	12	0	.250	285	378	L2

== Postseason ==
=== Schedule ===
Playoff Round	Date	Opponent (seed)	Result	Record	Game Site
Wild Card	January 3, 1999	Green Bay Packers (5)	W 30–27	1–0	3Com Park
Divisional	January 9, 1999	at Atlanta Falcons (2)	L 18–20	1–1	Georgia Dome

==== NFC Wild Card Playoffs: vs. (5) Green Bay Packers ====
NFC Wild Card: Green Bay Packers at San Francisco 49ers – Game summary

Quarter	1	2	3	4	Total
Packers	3	14	0	10	27
49ers	7	3	10	10	30

at 3Com Park, San Francisco

- Date: January 3, 1999
- Game time: 1:25 p.m. PDT
- Game weather: 61 °F or 16.1 °C (Cloudy)

Game information
First quarter
- GB – FG Ryan Longwell 23-yard field goal. Packers 3–0
- SF – TD Greg Clark 1-yard pass from Steve Young (Wade Richey). 49ers 7–3

Second quarter

- GB – TD Antonio Freeman 2-yard pass from Brett Favre (Ryan Longwell kick). Packers 10–7
- SF – FG Wade Richey 34-yard field goal. Tie 10–10
- GB – TD Dorsey Levens 2-yard rush (Ryan Longwell) kick. Packers 17–10

Third quarter

- SF – TD Greg Clark 8-yard pass from Steve Young. (Wade Richey kick). Tie 17–17
- SF – FG Wade Richey 48-yard field goal. 49ers 20–17

Fourth quarter

- GB – FG Ryan Longwell 37-yard field goal. Tie 20–20
- SF – FG Wade Richey 40-yard field goal. 49ers 23–20
- GB – TD Antonio Freeman 15-yard pass from Brett Favre (Ryan Longwell kick). Packers 27–23
- SF – TD Terrell Owens 25-yard pass from Steve Young. 49ers 30–27

For the first time in the Brett Favre era, the 49ers pulled off a victory over the Packers. After a late Packers touchdown, the Niners trailed 27–23 and a continuing issue during the game was dropped passes by the receiver Terrell Owens. In the final ten seconds, Steve Young dropped back in the Packers' RedZone, stumbled but stayed on his feet, then heaved the ball to the endzone where Owens caught it and landed in the endzone with four seconds left, holding on to the ball despite hits by two Packers defensive backs. The Niners had pulled out one of the most dramatic wins in their history. This play is often referred to by 49ers fans as "the Catch II", a reference to "The Catch" touchdown from Joe Montana to Dwight Clark in the final minute against the Cowboys in the 1981 playoffs. The victory over the Packers turned out to be Young's final playoff win.

==== NFC Divisional Playoffs: at (2) Atlanta Falcons ====
NFC Divisional Round: San Francisco 49ers at Atlanta Falcons – Game summary

Quarter	1	2	3	4	Total
49ers	0	10	0	8	18
Falcons	7	7	3	3	20

at Georgia Dome, Atlanta

- Date: January 9, 1999
- Game time: 12:30 p.m. EST

The game started poorly for the 13–4 49ers, who lost 1,500-yard rusher Garrison Hearst to a broken bone in his left leg on the first play of the game. Backup Terry Kirby was only able to rush for 46 yards. With their running game hobbled, the 49ers trailed 14–0 in the first half, and 20–10 going into the fourth quarter. With 2:57 remaining, Young scored on an 8-yard run and the team converted a two-point conversion after a botched snap, to bring the score to 20–18. The 49ers had one more chance to win with the ball deep in their territory but Young threw a desperation pass that was picked off by the Falcons' William White.

== Awards and records ==
- Franchise Record, Most Rushing Yards in One Game, 328 Rushing Yards (vs. Detroit Lions on December 14, 1998)
- Led NFL, Total Yards, 6,800 Total Yards
- Garrison Hearst, Franchise Record, Most Rushing Yards in One Season, 1,570 Rushing Yards
- Steve Young, Franchise Record, Most Touchdown Passes in One Season, 36 Touchdown Passes
- Steve Young, Led NFL, Touchdown Passes, 36 Passes
