= 1999 San Francisco 49ers season =

American football team season

- Owner: Edward J. DeBartolo Jr.
- General manager: Bill Walsh
- Head coach: Steve Mariucci
- Offensive coordinator: Marty Mornhinweg
- Defensive coordinator: Jim L. Mora
- Home stadium: 3Com Park

Results
- Record: 4–12
- Division place: 4th NFC West
- Playoffs: Did not qualify
- All-Pros: Bryant Young (2nd team)
- Pro Bowlers: S Lance Schulters

Uniform
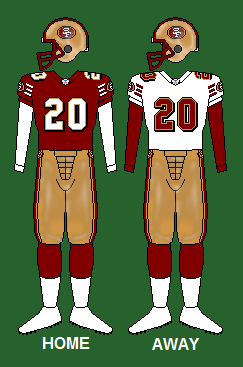

The 1999 season was the San Francisco 49ers' 50th in the National Football League (NFL) and their 54th overall. This was also Steve Young's last season in the league as he was forced to retire due to concussions.

San Francisco started the season with a 3–1 record and were heavily favored to win the Super Bowl but Young suffered his season- and career-ending concussion against the Arizona Cardinals in Week 3. After defeating the Cardinals and the Tennessee Titans without Young, the 49ers went on to lose 10 of the remaining 11 games of the season. It was the first time the team had missed the playoffs since 1991, their second time missing the playoffs in 17 seasons, and their first losing season (excluding the strike shortened 1982 season) since 1980. It was also their first season with fewer than 10 wins (excluding the strike shortened 1982 season) since 1980.

Statistics site Football Outsiders calculates that the 1999 49ers had the second-worst pass defense they had ever tracked.

== Offseason ==
=== NFL draft ===
1999 San Francisco 49ers draft
Round	Pick	Player	Position	College	Notes
1	24	Reggie McGrew	Defensive tackle	Florida	from Miami
3	89	Chike Okeafor	Defensive end	Purdue	
4	99	Anthony Parker	Cornerback	Weber State	from Indianapolis - Injured rookie year
4	110	Pierson Prioleau	Safety	Virginia Tech	from Cleveland
5	157	Terry Jackson	Fullback	Florida	from Miami
5	161	Tyrone Hopson	Guard	Eastern Kentucky	
6	171	Tai Streets	Wide receiver	Michigan	from Indianapolis
7	234	Kory Minor	Linebacker	Notre Dame	made Carolina roster in 1999.
Made roster * Made at least one Pro Bowl during career

== Personnel ==
=== Staff ===
1999 San Francisco 49ers staff
Front office: Owner – Edward J. DeBartolo, Jr.; President – Carmen Policy; Vice-president/Director of Football Operations – Dwight Clark; Director of player personnel – Vinny Cerrato; Director of pro personnel – Bill McPherson; Head coaches: Head coach – Steve Mariucci; Offensive coaches: Offensive coordinator/quarterbacks – Marty Mornhinweg; Assistant quarterbacks – Greg Knapp; Running backs – Tom Rathman; Wide receivers – Larry Kirksey; Tight ends – Tom Batta; Offensive line – Bobb McKittrick; Assistant offensive line – Patrick Morris; Offensive quality control – Andy Sugarman	Defensive coaches: Defensive coordinator – Jim Mora; Defensive line – Dwaine Board; Linebackers – Richard Smith; Assistant linebackers – Rod Rust; Defensive backs – Greg Brown; Defensive secondary/strength development coordinator – Michael Barnes; Assistant secondary – Brett Maxie; Defensive quality control – Chris Beake; Special teams coaches: Special teams Coordinator – George Stewart; Strength and conditioning: Physical development coordinator – Jerry Attaway

=== Roster ===
1999 San Francisco 49ers roster
Quarterbacks (QB): 10 Pat Barnes; 5 Jeff Garcia; 18 Steve Stenstrom; Running backs (RB): 40 Fred Beasley FB; 25 Charlie Garner; 22 Terry Jackson; 32 Travis Jervey; 44 Tommy Vardell FB; Wide receivers (WR): 88 Mark Harris; 81 Terrell Owens; 15 Roell Preston; 80 Jerry Rice; 83 J. J. Stokes; 89 Tai Streets; Tight ends (TE): 85 Greg Clark; 86 Chad Fann	Offensive linemen (OL): 65 Ray Brown G; 71 Jeff Buckey G; 67 Chris Dalman C; 63 Derrick Deese T; 79 Dan Dercher T; 74 Dave Fiore T; 76 Dwayne Ledford C; 60 Ben Lynch C; 62 Jeremy Newberry G; 69 Phil Ostrowski G; Defensive linemen (DL): 90 Junior Bryant DT; 99 Brentson Buckner DT; 94 Charles Haley DE; 75 Matt Keneley DT; 91 Chike Okeafor DE; 96 Jeff Posey DE; 93 David Richie DE; 98 Gabe Wilkins DE; 97 Bryant Young DT	Linebackers (LB): 57 Chris Draft MLB; 59 Reggie Givens OLB; 51 Ken Norton Jr. OLB; 50 Tony Peterson OLB; 55 Winfred Tubbs MLB; 54 Lee Woodall OLB; Defensive backs (DB): 35 Ramos McDonald CB; 46 Tim McDonald SS; 27 Craig Newsome CB; 23 Pierson Prioleau CB/S; 30 Lance Schulters FS; 43 Wasswa Serwanga CB; 38 Darnell Walker CB; Special teams (ST): 58 Randy Kirk LS; 7 Wade Richey K; 4 Chad Stanley P; 52 Joe Zelenka LS	Practice squad: 29 Darwin Brown CB; 72 Josh Kobdish T; 68 Pete Swanson T; 45 Justin Swift TE; 77 Jason Tenner T; Reserve: 82 Shonn Bell TE (IR); 31 Zack Bronson S (IR); 8 Steve Young QB (IR); 20 Garrison Hearst RB (IR); 66 Tyrone Hopson G (IR); 92 Reggie McGrew DT (IR); 21 R. W. McQuarters CB (IR); 24 Monty Montgomery CB (IR); 26 Anthony Parker CB (IR); 95 Marvin Washington DE (IR); 56 Joe Wesley LB (IR); Rookies in italics 53 active, 10 reserve, 5 practice squad

== Preseason ==
Week	Date	Opponent	Result	Record	Venue	Sources
1	August 12	San Diego Chargers	W 31–24	1–0	3Com Park	
2	August 19	Seattle Seahawks	W 24-23	2–0	3Com Park	
3	August 30	at Oakland Raiders	W 16–8	3–0	Network Associates Coliseum	
4	September 3	at Denver Broncos	L 3–34	3–1	Mile High Stadium	

== Regular season ==
=== Schedule ===
Week	Date	Opponent	Result	Record	Venue	Recap
1	September 12	at Jacksonville Jaguars	**L** 3–41	0–1	Alltel Stadium	Recap
2	September 19	**New Orleans Saints**	**W** 28–21	1–1	3Com Park	Recap
3	September 27	at Arizona Cardinals	**W** 24–10	2–1	Sun Devil Stadium	Recap
4	October 3	Tennessee Titans	**W** 24–22	3–1	3Com Park	Recap
5	October 10	at **St. Louis Rams**	**L** 20–42	3–2	Trans World Dome	Recap
6	October 17	**Carolina Panthers**	**L** 29–31	3–3	3Com Park	Recap
7	October 24	at Minnesota Vikings	**L** 16–40	3–4	Hubert H. Humphrey Metrodome	Recap
8	Bye					
9	November 7	Pittsburgh Steelers	**L** 6–27	3–5	3Com Park	Recap
10	November 14	at **New Orleans Saints**	**L** 6–24	3–6	Louisiana Superdome	Recap
11	November 21	**St. Louis Rams**	**L** 7–23	3–7	3Com Park	Recap
12	November 29	Green Bay Packers	**L** 3–20	3–8	3Com Park	Recap
13	December 5	at Cincinnati Bengals	**L** 30–44	3–9	Cinergy Field	Recap
14	December 12	**Atlanta Falcons**	**W** 26–7	4–9	3Com Park	Recap
15	December 18	at **Carolina Panthers**	**L** 24–41	4–10	Ericsson Stadium	Recap
16	December 26	Washington Redskins	**L** 20–26 (OT)	4–11	3Com Park	Recap
17	January 3, 2000	at **Atlanta Falcons**	**L** 29–34	4–12	Georgia Dome	Recap
Note: Intra-division opponents are in **bold** text.

=== Standings ===
NFC West
	W	L	T	PCT	PF	PA	STK
^{(1)} St. Louis Rams	13	3	0	.813	526	242	L1
Carolina Panthers	8	8	0	.500	421	381	W1
Atlanta Falcons	5	11	0	.313	285	380	W2
San Francisco 49ers	4	12	0	.250	295	453	L3
New Orleans Saints	3	13	0	.188	260	434	L1
