= 1998–99 NFL playoffs =

American football tournament

- Dates: January 2–31, 1999
- Season: 1998
- Teams: 12
- Games played: 11
- Super Bowl XXXIII site: Pro Player Stadium; Miami, Florida
- Defending champions: Denver Broncos
- Champion: Denver Broncos (2nd title)
- Runner-up: Atlanta Falcons
- Conference runners-up: Minnesota Vikings; New York Jets
NFL playoffs
← 1997–98	1999–2000 →

The National Football League playoffs for the 1998 season began on January 2, 1999. The postseason tournament concluded with the Denver Broncos defeating the Atlanta Falcons in Super Bowl XXXIII, 34–19, on January 31, at Pro Player Stadium in Miami, Florida.

== Participants ==
Within each conference, the three division winners and the three non-division winners with the best overall regular season records qualified for the playoffs. The three division winners were seeded 1–3 based on the overall won-lost-tied record, and the three wild card teams were seeded 4–6. The NFL did not use a fixed bracket playoff system, and there were no restrictions regarding teams from the same division matching up in any round. In the first round, dubbed the wild-card playoffs or wild-card weekend, the third-seeded division winner hosted the sixth seed wild card, and the fourth seed hosted the fifth. The 1 and 2 seeds from each conference received a first-round bye. In the second round, the divisional playoffs, the number 1 seed hosted the worst-remaining seed from the first round (seed 4, 5, or 6), while the number 2 seed played the other team (seed 3, 4, or 5). The two winning teams from each conference's divisional playoff games then meet in the respective AFC and NFC Conference Championship games, hosted by the higher seed. Although the Super Bowl, the championship round of the playoffs, was played at a neutral site, the designated home team was based on an annual rotation by conference.

Playoff seeds
Seed	AFC	NFC
1	Denver Broncos (West winner)	Minnesota Vikings (Central winner)
2	New York Jets (East winner)	Atlanta Falcons (West winner)
3	Jacksonville Jaguars (Central winner)	Dallas Cowboys (East winner)
4	Miami Dolphins (wild card)	San Francisco 49ers (wild card)
5	Buffalo Bills (wild card)	Green Bay Packers (wild card)
6	New England Patriots (wild card)	Arizona Cardinals (wild card)

== Bracket ==
Jan 3 – Alltel Stadium	Jan 10 – Giants Stadium
6	New England	10
3	Jacksonville	24
3	Jacksonville	25	Jan 17 – Mile High Stadium
2	NY Jets	34
AFC
Jan 2 – Pro Player Stadium	2	NY Jets	10
Jan 9 – Mile High Stadium
1	Denver	23
5	Buffalo	17	AFC Championship
4	Miami	3
4	Miami	24	Jan 31 – Pro Player Stadium
1	Denver	38
Wild-card round
Divisional round
Jan 3 – 3Com Park	A1	Denver	34
Jan 9 – Georgia Dome
N2	Atlanta	19
5	Green Bay	27	Super Bowl XXXIII
4	San Francisco	18
4	San Francisco	30	Jan 17 – Hubert H. Humphrey Metrodome
2	Atlanta	20
NFC
Jan 2 – Texas Stadium	2	Atlanta	30*
Jan 10 – Hubert H. Humphrey Metrodome
1	Minnesota	27
6	Arizona	20	NFC Championship
6	Arizona	21
3	Dallas	7
1	Minnesota	41

* Indicates overtime victory

== Schedule ==
Under the new U.S. television broadcast contracts that took effect starting this season, CBS replaced NBC as the broadcaster of most of the AFC playoff games. ABC continued to broadcast the first two Wild Card playoff games. Fox televised the rest of the NFC games and Super Bowl XXXIII.

Round	Away team	Score	Home team	Date	Kickoff (ET / UTC−5)	TV
Wild-card round	Buffalo Bills	17–24	Miami Dolphins	January 2, 1999	12:30 p.m.	ABC
Wild-card round	Arizona Cardinals	20–7	Dallas Cowboys	January 2, 1999	4:00 p.m.	ABC
Wild-card round	New England Patriots	10–25	Jacksonville Jaguars	January 3, 1999	12:30 p.m.	CBS
Wild-card round	Green Bay Packers	27–30	San Francisco 49ers	January 3, 1999	4:00 p.m.	Fox
Divisional round	San Francisco 49ers	18–20	Atlanta Falcons	January 9, 1999	12:30 p.m.	Fox
Divisional round	Miami Dolphins	3–38	Denver Broncos	January 9, 1999	4:00 p.m.	CBS
Divisional round	Jacksonville Jaguars	24–34	New York Jets	January 10, 1999	12:30 p.m.	CBS
Divisional round	Arizona Cardinals	21–41	Minnesota Vikings	January 10, 1999	4:00 p.m.	Fox
Conference championships	Atlanta Falcons	30–27 (OT)	Minnesota Vikings	January 17, 1999	12:30 p.m.	Fox
Conference championships	New York Jets	10–23	Denver Broncos	January 17, 1999	4:00 p.m.	CBS
Super Bowl XXXIII Pro Player Stadium Miami, Florida	Denver Broncos	34–19	Atlanta Falcons	January 31, 1999	6:25 p.m.	Fox

== Wild-card round ==
=== Saturday, January 2, 1999 ===
==== AFC: Miami Dolphins 24, Buffalo Bills 17 ====
Buffalo Bills vs. Miami Dolphins – Game summary

Quarter	1	2	3	4	Total
Bills	0	7	7	3	17
Dolphins	3	3	8	10	24

at Pro Player Stadium, Miami, Florida

- Game time: 12:30 p.m. EST
- Game weather: 80 °F (27 °C), partly cloudy
- Game attendance: 72,698
- Referee: Mike Carey
- TV announcers (ABC): Al Michaels (play-by-play), Dan Dierdorf, Boomer Esiason (color commentators), and Lesley Visser (sideline reporter)

Game information

First quarter

- MIA – Olindo Mare 32-yard field goal. Dolphins 3–0.

Second quarter

- MIA – Olindo Mare 40-yard field goal. Dolphins 6–0.
- BUF – Thurman Thomas 1-yard run (Steve Christie kick). Bills 7–6.
- MIA – Olindo Mare 23-yard field goal. Dolphins 9–7.

Third quarter

- MIA – Abdul-Karim Al-Jabbar 3-yard run (Stanley Pritchett run). Dolphins 17–7.
- BUF – Eric Moulds 32-yard pass from Doug Flutie (Steve Christie kick). Dolphins 17–14.

Fourth quarter

- MIA – Lamar Thomas 12-yard pass from Dan Marino (Olindo Mare kick). Dolphins 24–14.
- BUF – Steve Christie 33-yard field goal. Dolphins 24–17.

Top passers

- BUF – Doug Flutie – 21/36, 360 yards, TD, INT
- MIA – Dan Marino – 23/34, 235 yards, TD, INT

Top rushers

- BUF – Thurman Thomas – 7 rushes, 33 yards, TD
- MIA – Abdul-Karim Al-Jabbar – 27 rushes, 95 yards, TD

Top receivers

- BUF – Eric Moulds – 9 receptions, 240 yards, TD
- MIA – Oronde Gadsden – 5 receptions, 85 yards

The Dolphins forced five Bills turnovers, including Buffalo quarterback Doug Flutie's fumble at the Miami 5-yard line with 17 seconds left in the game. Buffalo's wide receiver Eric Moulds set an NFL postseason record with 240 receiving yards, including a 32-yard touchdown catch.

The Bills had a great scoring chance when Moulds caught a 65-yard pass from Flutie on the first play from scrimmage, but Terrell Buckley knocked the ball out of his hands and safety Brock Marion recovered the fumble, returning it 17 yards to the Miami 29. Miami then drove 57 yards in 16 plays to score on kicker Olindo Mare's 31-yard field goal. After forcing a punt, Miami went on another long field goal drive, this one covering 66 yards in 11 plays, including a 22-yard reception by Ed Perry and two pass interference calls against Buffalo for a total of 26 yards.

Mare's 40-yard field goal gave the Dolphins a 6–0 lead with over 10 minutes left in the second quarter, but a failed surprise onside kick attempt gave Buffalo the ball on the Dolphins 42. Moulds then caught a 37-yard pass to set up Thurman Thomas' 1-yard touchdown run. Near the end of the half, Buffalo drove to the Dolphins 6-yard line, but Marion intercepted a pass from Flutie in the end zone with less than a minute left on the clock. Miami also blew a scoring chance as Dan Marino completed a 52-yard pass to Oronde Gadsden at the Bills 9-yard line on the next play, but Mare missed a 26-yard field goal on the last play of the half.

In the third quarter, Miami got an early scoring chance when Derrick Rodgers forced a fumble while sacking Flutie that linebacker Zach Thomas recovered on the Bills 40-yard line. But the Bills defense only allowed three yards over the next three plays and forced a punt. Miami's defense then returned the favor by forcing Buffalo to punt after three plays, and O. J. McDuffie returned Chris Mohr's 39-yard kick 20 yards to the Dolphins 48-yard line. Miami went on to take a 14–7 lead with a 12-play, 52-yard drive to score on Karim Abdul-Jabbar's 3-yard run (and Stanley Pritchett's 2-point conversion). However, Buffalo stormed right back with a 4-play, 81-yard touchdown drive to tie the game, taking advantage of a pass interference call against Patrick Surtain that gave them 29 yards. On the next play, Flutie's 23-yard completion to Moulds moved the ball to the Miami 32-yard line, and he ended up finishing the drive with a 32-yard touchdown completion to Moulds with less than a minute left in the quarter.

On Miami's opening drive of the fourth quarter, Marino completed 5/5 passes for 54 yards on a 75-yard drive that ended with Mare's third field goal, giving the Dolphins a 17–14 lead. Then Jerry Wilson forced a fumble while tackling Andre Reed, and Buckley recovered the ball for Miami at midfield, leading to Marino's 11-yard touchdown pass to Lamar Thomas that made the score a 10-point game at 24–14 with 3:42 left on the clock.

With time running out in the game, Flutie completed a 31-yard pass to Moulds and then threw the ball to Reed, who was tackled on the Miami 1-yard line. Believing he had scored, Reed argued vehemently with the referee Steve Zimmer and bumped into him, drawing an unsportsmanlike conduct foul that got the receiver ejected from the game. It also pushed the Bills back 15 yards and left them facing second and goal from the 15 instead of the 1. Flutie's next two passes were incomplete, forcing the Bills to settle for Steve Christie's 33-yard field goal with 1:47 left. Buffalo subsequently recovered an onside kick and drove 64 yards in 10 plays to the Dolphins 5-yard line. But as Flutie stepped up to make a throw, he lost the ball while being sacked by Miami's Trace Armstrong and defensive tackle Shane Burton recovered the fumble.

"There wasn't any doubt he was in", Bills coach Wade Phillips said about Reed's ejection after the game. "That game looks a lot different at the end. With Andre Reed in the game and us only down 3, we would have done some different things at the end."

This was the fourth postseason meeting between the Bills and Dolphins. Buffalo won all three previous meetings.

Previous playoff games
Buffalo leads 3–0 in all-time playoff games

1990

Miami Dolphins 34 @ Buffalo Bills 44

1990 AFC Divisional playoffs

1992

Buffalo Bills 29 @ Miami Dolphins 10

1992 AFC Championship Game

1995

Miami Dolphins 22 @ Buffalo Bills 37

1995 AFC Wild Card playoffs

==== NFC: Arizona Cardinals 20, Dallas Cowboys 7 ====
Arizona Cardinals vs. Dallas Cowboys – Game summary

Quarter	1	2	3	4	Total
Cardinals	7	3	7	3	20
Cowboys	0	0	0	7	7

at Texas Stadium, Irving, Texas

- Game time: 4:00 p.m. EST/3:00 p.m. CST
- Game weather: 61 °F (16 °C), clear
- Game attendance: 62,969
- Referee: Bernie Kukar
- TV announcers (ABC): Mike Patrick (play-by-play), Joe Theismann, Paul Maguire (color commentators), and Solomon Wilcots (sideline reporter)
- Box Score

Game information

First quarter

- ARI – Adrian Murrell 12-yard pass from Jake Plummer (Chris Jacke kick). Cardinals 7–0.

Second quarter

- ARI – Chris Jacke 37-yard field goal. Cardinals 10–0.

Third quarter

- ARI – Larry Centers 3-yard pass from Jake Plummer (Chris Jacke kick). Cardinals 17–0.

Fourth quarter

- ARI – Chris Jacke 46-yard field goal. Cardinals 20–0.
- DAL – Billy Davis 6-yard pass from Troy Aikman (Richie Cunningham kick). Cardinals 20–7.

Top passers

- ARI – Jake Plummer – 19/36, 213 yards, 2 TD, 2 INT
- DAL – Troy Aikman – 22/49, 191 yards, TD, 3 INT

Top rushers

- ARI – Adrian Murrell – 12 rushes, 95 yards
- DAL – Emmitt Smith – 16 rushes, 74 yards

Top receivers

- ARI – Frank Sanders – 3 receptions, 72 yards
- DAL – Patrick Jeffers – 7 receptions, 92 yards

Quarterback Jake Plummer passed for 213 yards and two touchdowns as he led the Cardinals to their first playoff victory since 1947, ending the longest playoff win drought in NFL history. Their victory was especially satisfying against the Cowboys, who defeated them twice during the season (38–10 on opening day and 35–28 in week 11). Arizona running back Adrian Murrell rushed for 95 yards and caught two passes for 16 yards and a touchdown, while their defense sacked Cowboys quarterback Troy Aikman four times (twice by linebacker Jamir Miller and two more by Andre Wadsworth) and intercepted three of his passes (two by cornerback Aeneas Williams).

Dallas had a chance to score on their second drive when Tyrone Hughes returned an Arizona punt 11 yards to the Cowboys 38. Aikman then led the team to the Cardinals 19-yard line, but the drive ended there and Richie Cunningham missed a 36-yard field goal attempt. On the first play of the Cardinals' following possession, Plummer completed a 59-yard pass to receiver Frank Sanders, setting up Murrell's 12-yard touchdown catch a few plays later.

In the second quarter, the Cowboys got another scoring opportunity when cornerback Kevin Mathis picked off a pass from Plummer on the Dallas 37. Dallas went on to drive to the Cardinals 7-yard line. On fourth and 1, the Cowboys tried to convert with a run by Emmitt Smith, but he was stopped by linebacker Mark Maddox, who broke through the line and dropped him for a 1-yard loss. Dallas' three remaining drives of the half would result in an interception by Williams and two punts, the second which was returned 10 yards to the Cardinals 38 by running back Eric Metcalf with less than two minutes left in the half. Plummer then completed a 15-yard pass to receiver Rob Moore and a 20 yarder to Metcalf, setting up a 37-yard Chris Jacke field goal that gave Arizona a 10–0 lead going into halftime.

On the second play of the second half, Murrell took off for a 74-yard run to the Cowboys 3-yard line. It was the longest postseason run ever surrendered by the Cowboys in their 52-postseason game history. On the next play, Plummer threw a 3-yard touchdown pass to fullback Larry Centers, making the score 17–0. On the first play of the fourth quarter, Williams recorded his second interception from Aikman, setting up a 46-yard field goal by Jacke. Now desperate for points, Dallas tried to convert a fourth and 1 deep in their own territory, only to have Aikman get sacked by Miller for a 10-yard loss. An interception by Darren Woodson prevented Arizona from scoring, but with only ten minutes remaining on the clock, there was little hope for a comeback. All Dallas could do was avoid a shutout when Deion Sanders' 41-yard punt return set up Aikman's 6-yard touchdown pass to Billy Davis with 3:33 left in the game.

It was the last time ABC aired a game between these two teams, after six games on Monday Night Football. ESPN finally aired a game between these two in 2017 (though they did meet on Sunday night on ESPN once). It was the last playoff game at Texas Stadium until 2007.

Arizona ended a nine-game losing streak at Texas Stadium; their previous win was during the Cowboys' 1–15 season of 1989. This was just the Cardinals' second victory vs. the Cowboys in the previous 18 meetings, the other being a 25–22 overtime victory in week two of 1997 at Sun Devil Stadium. Arizona lost its last four visits to Texas Stadium between 1999 and 2005, and finished with an all-time mark of 5–27 in the facility.

This was the first postseason meeting between the Cardinals and Cowboys.

=== January 3, 1999 ===
==== AFC: Jacksonville Jaguars 25, New England Patriots 10 ====
New England Patriots vs. Jacksonville Jaguars – Game summary

Quarter	1	2	3	4	Total
Patriots	0	0	7	3	10
Jaguars	6	6	0	13	25

at Alltel Stadium, Jacksonville, Florida

- Game time: 12:30 p.m. EST
- Game weather: 75 °F (24 °C), partly cloudy
- Game attendance: 71,139
- Referee: Ron Blum
- TV announcers (CBS): Greg Gumbel (play-by-play), Phil Simms (color commentator), and Armen Keteyian (sideline reporter)
- Recap, Game Book

Game information

First quarter

- JAX – Mike Hollis 35-yard field goal. Jaguars 3–0.
- JAX – Mike Hollis 24-yard field goal. Jaguars 6–0.

Second quarter

- JAX – Fred Taylor 13-yard run (run failed). Jaguars 12–0.

Third quarter

- NE – Robert Edwards 1-yard run (Adam Vinatieri kick). Jaguars 12–7.

Fourth quarter

- NE – Adam Vinatieri 27-yard field goal. Jaguars 12–10.
- JAX – Jimmy Smith 37-yard pass from Mark Brunell (Mike Hollis kick). Jaguars 19–10.
- JAX – Mike Hollis 34-yard field goal. Jaguars 22–10.
- JAX – Mike Hollis 21-yard field goal. Jaguars 25–10.

Top passers

- NE – Scott Zolak – 21/44, 190 yards, 1 INT
- JAX – Mark Brunell – 14/34, 161 yards, 1 TD

Top rushers

- NE – Robert Edwards – 17 rushes, 28 yards, 1 TD
- JAX – Fred Taylor – 33 rushes, 162 yards, 1 TD

Top receivers

- NE – Troy Brown – 4 receptions, 46 yards
- JAX – Keenan McCardell – 6 receptions, 72 yards

Running back Fred Taylor ran for 162 yards and a touchdown as the Jaguars won their first home playoff game in team history. Jacksonville kicker Mike Hollis contributed four field goals. Patriots running back Robert Edwards, who rushed for 1,115 yards and nine touchdowns during the season, was held to 28 yards on 17 carries.

The Patriots, playing without starting quarterback Drew Bledsoe, receiver Terry Glenn and linebacker Ted Johnson due to injuries, could not score any points in the first half. Hollis opened up the scoring with two field goals. The second one was set up by a 46-yard run by Taylor and followed two overthrown passes by quarterback Mark Brunell to receiver Keenan McCardell and running back George Jones, who were both wide open in the end zone. Brunell struggled throughout most of the game, finishing with just 14 of 34 completions for 161 yards. Later in the second quarter, Taylor's 21-yard run gave his team a first down on the Patriots 34-yard line. Four plays later, he scored on a 13-yard touchdown run, giving his team a 12–0 lead after a failed 2-point conversion attempt. Jacksonville got another chance to score when cornerback Aaron Beasley recovered a fumble from Edwards on the Jags 49-yard line. But New England's defense managed to force a turnover on downs at the Patriots 23-yard line, and the score would remain 12–0 going into halftime.

In the third quarter, Patriots quarterback Scott Zolak managed to spark a rally. First he led New England 85 yards, including a 21-yard completion to Troy Brown on third and 9, on a drive that consumed 8:48 off the clock and ended with a 1-yard touchdown run from Edwards. Their defense quickly forced a punt, and Brown returned it 17 yards to the Patriots 46-yard line, where the team proceeded to drive to the Jacksonville 9. Following a dropped pass by tight end Lovett Purnell on third down, Adam Vinatieri's 27-yard field goal cut it to 12–10. But on the Jaguars ensuing possession, Brunell threw a pass to receiver Jimmy Smith, who managed to break past cornerback Ty Law and make a 37-yard touchdown catch in the back of the end zone. After a punt from each team, Jacksonville defensive end Joel Smeenge forced a fumble while sacking Zolak that defensive end Tony Brackens recovered on the Patriots 25-yard line, setting up Hollis' third field goal. He added a fourth field goal to close out the scoring after the Patriots turned the ball over on downs deep in their own territory on their next possession. Then on New England's final play, Zolak was intercepted by safety Chris Hudson.

This would be the Jags' only victory against the Patriots, in either the regular or postseason, until Week 2 of the 2018 regular season. It would also be the Patriots' last playoff loss until 2005 and the last Wild Card loss until 2009.

This was the second postseason meeting between the Patriots and Jaguars. New England won the only prior meeting.

Previous playoff games
New England leads 1–0 in all-time playoff games

1996

Jacksonville Jaguars 6 @ New England Patriots 20

1996 AFC Championship Game

==== NFC: San Francisco 49ers 30, Green Bay Packers 27 ====
Green Bay Packers vs. San Francisco 49ers – Game summary

Quarter	1	2	3	4	Total
Packers	3	14	0	10	27
49ers	7	3	10	10	30

at 3Com Park at Candlestick Point, San Francisco, California

- Game time: 4:00 p.m. EST/1:00 p.m. PST
- Game weather: 60 °F (16 °C), clear
- Game attendance: 66,506
- Referee: Gerald Austin
- TV announcers (Fox): Pat Summerall (play-by-play) and John Madden (color commentator)

Game information

First quarter

- GB – Ryan Longwell 23-yard field goal. Packers 3–0.
- SF – Greg Clark 1-yard pass from Steve Young (Wade Richey kick). 49ers 7–3.

Second quarter

- GB – Antonio Freeman 2-yard pass from Brett Favre (Ryan Longwell kick). Packers 10–7.
- SF – Wade Richey 34-yard field goal. Tied 10–10.
- GB – Dorsey Levens 2-yard run (Ryan Longwell kick). Packers 17–10.

Third quarter

- SF – Greg Clark 8-yard pass from Steve Young (Wade Richey kick). Tied 17–17.
- SF – Wade Richey 48-yard field goal. 49ers 20–17.

Fourth quarter

- GB – Ryan Longwell 37-yard field goal. Tied 20–20.
- SF – Wade Richey 40-yard field goal. 49ers 23–20.
- GB – Antonio Freeman 15-yard pass from Brett Favre (Ryan Longwell kick). Packers 27–23.
- SF – Terrell Owens 25-yard pass from Steve Young (Wade Richey kick). 49ers 30–27.

Top passers

- GB – Brett Favre – 20/35, 292 yards, 2 TD, 2 INT
- SF – Steve Young – 18/32, 182 yards, 3 TD, 2 INT

Top rushers

- GB – Dorsey Levens – 27 rushes, 116 yards, 1 TD
- SF – Garrison Hearst – 22 rushes, 128 yards

Top receivers

- GB – Antonio Freeman – 4 receptions, 75 yards, 2 TD
- SF – Terrell Owens – 3 receptions, 73 yards, 1 TD

The 49ers defeated the Packers, who had eliminated them from the playoffs in each of the past three seasons, in one of the wildest back-and-forth games in league history in what would be the last hurrah in the 49ers dynasty.

Both teams took advantage of each other's turnovers and mistakes throughout the game. In the first quarter, Green Bay safety Pat Terrell's recovery of a fumble from receiver Terrell Owens set up a 48-yard drive that ended with a Ryan Longwell field goal. But later in the quarter, Chris Doleman recovered a fumble from Dorsey Levens on the Packers 17-yard line. Two plays later, Steve Young threw a 1-yard touchdown pass to tight end Greg Clark, giving San Francisco a 7–3 lead. The Packers offense responded by driving 62 yards in nine plays, and Levens made up for his miscue with a 22-yard run to the 49ers 2-yard line on fourth down and 1. On the next play, quarterback Brett Favre finished the drive with a 2-yard touchdown pass to Antonio Freeman four seconds into the second quarter.

Later in the second quarter, 49ers cornerback R. W. McQuarters returned a punt 19 yards to the 47-yard line. Running back Garrison Hearst then rushed three times for 28 yards on a 37-yard drive that ended with a field goal by Wade Richey, tying the game at 10. But before the half ended, the Packers retook the lead with a 9-play, 83-yard drive, aided by two 15-yard penalties against San Francisco. Levens finished the drive with a 2-yard touchdown run, giving Green Bay a 17–10 halftime lead.

Early in the third quarter, 49ers linebacker Lee Woodall intercepted a pass from Favre and returned it 17 yards to the Packers 33-yard line. Four plays later, Owens dropped a pass in the end zone, but Young threw his second touchdown pass to Clark on the next play, tying the score at 17. Then after forcing a punt, they took the lead by driving 48 yards and scoring with a 48-yard field goal by Richey.

In the fourth quarter, the Packers drove 60 yards in 11 plays, featuring a 33-yard reception by fullback William Henderson, and scored a 37-yard field goal to tie the game. But on the 49ers ensuing drive, a 34-yard completion for Young to Owens set up another Richey field goal to put them back in the lead, 23–20. With 6:16 left in the game, 49ers cornerback Darnell Walker intercepted a pass from Favre and returned it to the Packers 40-yard line, giving his team a chance to put it out of reach. But after two runs by Hearst failed to make a significant gain, Owens dropped a potential first-down catch, his fourth drop of the day, and San Francisco had to punt.

Taking the ball back at their own 11-yard line with 4:19 remaining, Favre led the Packers back to retake the lead on a 15-yard touchdown pass to Freeman at the end of an 89-yard drive, featuring a 47-yard completion to seldom-used rookie receiver Corey Bradford. But San Francisco responded with an equally impressive drive, in which Jerry Rice visibly fumbled on his first reception of the game, but was ruled down by contact even though replays appeared to show the ball came out before his knee hit the ground. The use of instant replay challenges was not in effect until the following year, allowing the drive to continue behind Young, who completed seven of nine passes on a 76-yard drive for the winning score. Owens, who had dropped four passes and lost a fumble, caught the 25-yard winning touchdown pass with three seconds left in the game.

Hearst finished the game with 128 rushing yards and three receptions for 15 yards. Levens rushed for 116 yards, caught six passes for 37 yards, and scored a touchdown. Favre threw for 292 yards and two touchdowns, while Young passed for 182 yards and three scores. Both Young and Favre were intercepted twice. Packers receiver Roell Preston set a postseason franchise record with 198 kickoff return yards.

This game was later featured on the NFL's Greatest Games as The Catch II.

This was the fourth postseason meeting between the Packers and 49ers as well as the fourth year in the row they had played each other in the postseason. Green Bay won all three previous meetings.

Previous playoff games
Green Bay leads 3–0 in all-time playoff games

1995

Green Bay Packers 27 @ San Francisco 49ers 17

1995 NFC Divisional playoffs

1996

San Francisco 49ers 14 @ Green Bay Packers 35

1996 NFC Divisional playoffs

1997

Green Bay Packers 23 @ San Francisco 49ers 10

1997 NFC Championship Game

== Divisional round ==
=== Saturday, January 9, 1999 ===
==== NFC: Atlanta Falcons 20, San Francisco 49ers 18 ====
San Francisco 49ers vs. Atlanta Falcons – Game summary

Quarter	1	2	3	4	Total
49ers	0	10	0	8	18
Falcons	7	7	3	3	20

at Georgia Dome, Atlanta, Georgia

- Game time: 12:30 p.m. EST/9:30 a.m. PST
- Game weather: Played indoors, domed stadium
- Game attendance: 70,262
- Referee: Jerry Markbreit
- TV announcers (Fox): Dick Stockton (play-by-play), Matt Millen (color commentator), and Pam Oliver (sideline reporter)
- Box score

Game information

First quarter

- ATL – Jamal Anderson 2-yard run (Morten Anderson kick). Falcons 7–0.

Second quarter

- ATL – Jamal Anderson 34-yard run (Morten Anderson kick). Falcons 14–0.
- SF – Jerry Rice 17-yard pass from Steve Young (Wade Richey kick). Falcons 14–7.
- SF – Wade Richey 36-yard field goal. Falcons 14–10.

Third quarter

- ATL – Morten Anderson 29-yard field goal. Falcons 17–10.

Fourth quarter

- ATL – Morten Anderson 32-yard field goal. Falcons 20–10.
- SF – Steve Young 8-yard run (Greg Clark pass from Ty Detmer). Falcons 20–18.

Top passers

- SF – Steve Young – 23/37, 289 yards, TD, 3 INT
- ATL – Chris Chandler – 13/19, 169 yards, INT

Top rushers

- SF – Terry Kirby – 9 rushes, 22 yards
- ATL – Jamal Anderson – 29 rushes, 113 yards, 2 TD

Top receivers

- SF – J. J. Stokes – 5 receptions, 76 yards
- ATL – Terance Mathis – 5 receptions, 71 yards

Atlanta running back Jamal Anderson rushed for 113 yards and two touchdowns, while the Falcons defense intercepted three passes from quarterback Steve Young as they barely escaped with a victory in the first playoff game ever played at the Georgia Dome. This would eventually prove to be the final postseason game in Young's Hall of Fame career, as well as the final game for 49ers defensive end Chris Doleman, who finished his 14-season career with 142.5 sacks.

On the first play of the game, the 49ers suffered a major setback when running back Garrison Hearst, who rushed for 1,570 yards during the season, suffered a broken ankle. This turned out to be a devastating injury that would prevent Hearst from playing another game until the 2001 season. Without Hearst, San Francisco would rush the ball only 19 times the rest of the game, and finished with just 47 yards on the ground. Hearst's 7-yard carry on his injury play would be the 49ers longest run of the day.

San Francisco was unable to get a first down on their first three possessions. At the end of their second one, Falcons receiver Tim Dwight returned Reggie Roby's 51-yard punt 36 yards to the 49ers 38-yard line. Atlanta then drove 38 yards in six plays to take a 7–0 lead on Anderson's 2-yard touchdown run. The key play of the drive with a 19-yard completion from Chris Chandler to Terance Mathis on third and 8 from the San Francisco 22.

Midway through the second quarter, Atlanta drove 82 yards in eight plays to go up 14–0 on a 34-yard burst by Anderson. On the 49ers next drive, backup running back Terry Kirby fumbled a pitch from Young. After several players scrambled for it, the ball bounced up in the air and was picked up by Atlanta's Chuck Smith, who returned it for an apparent touchdown. However, line judge Ron Baynes ruled that Kirby briefly gained possession of the ball and his knee was down when touched by Atlanta linebacker Henri Crockett, and the 49ers regained possession. A few plays later, faced with third and 23 Young picked up the first down with a 34-yard completion to Chuck Levy on the Falcons 26-yard line. His next pass went to tight end Greg Clark for nine yards, and then he threw a 17-yard touchdown pass to Jerry Rice, cutting the score to 14–7. On the Falcons ensuing possession, linebacker Charles Haley deflected a pass from Chandler into the arms of defensive end Junior Bryant, who returned the interception four yards to the Falcons 36-yard line. A 16-yard completion from Young to J. J. Stokes set up Wade Richey's 36-yard field goal to cut the 49ers deficit to 14–10 on the last play of the half.

In the third quarter, the 49ers drove all the way to the Falcons 3-yard line. But safety Eugene Robinson intercepted a pass from Young and returned it 77 yards to the 49ers 20-yard line, leading to Morten Andersen's 29-yard field goal. Later in the quarter, the 49ers drove deep into Falcons territory again, only to have Young throw an interception to William White, who returned the ball 14 yards with a personal foul on the 49ers adding another 15. Atlanta got the ball on the 49ers 36-yard line, and a 16-yard reception by Tony Martin on third and 8 got the team close enough to score on Andersen's second field goal, giving his team a 20–10 lead early in the fourth quarter.

San Francisco responded with an 87-yard, 13-play drive, featuring a 33-yard completion from Young to Stokes. On the last play, Young ran the ball into the end zone for an 8-yard touchdown. Backup quarterback Ty Detmer fumbled the snap on the extra point attempt, but he picked up the ball and threw it to Clark for a successful 2-point conversion to make it 20–18 with 2:57 left in the game. San Francisco managed to force a punt, but Dan Stryzinski managed to pin them back at their own 4-yard line with 34 seconds and no timeouts left. Young threw a 24-yard completion to Levy on the second play after that. But on the next play, White's interception at midfield as time expired sealed the victory. This was the last game for Jerry Markbreit as he retired from officiating NFL football. His first postseason assignment was the 1978 Pro Bowl, and he never failed to get a playoff assignment for the next 20 seasons. He still holds the record for Super Bowls for referees with four (XVII, XXI, XXVI and XXIX).

This was the first postseason meeting between the 49ers and Falcons.

This was Steve Young's final playoff game.

==== AFC: Denver Broncos 38, Miami Dolphins 3 ====
Miami Dolphins vs. Denver Broncos – Game summary

Quarter	1	2	3	4	Total
Dolphins	0	3	0	0	3
Broncos	14	7	3	14	38

at Mile High Stadium, Denver, Colorado

- Game time: 4:00 p.m. EST/2:00 p.m. MST
- Game weather: 46 °F (8 °C), clear
- Game attendance: 75,729
- Referee: Bill Carollo
- TV announcers (CBS): Greg Gumbel (play-by-play), Phil Simms (color commentator), and Armen Keteyian (sideline reporter)

Game information

First quarter

- DEN – Terrell Davis 1-yard run (Jason Elam kick). Broncos 7–0.
- DEN – Terrell Davis 20-yard run (Jason Elam kick). Broncos 14–0.

Second quarter

- MIA – Olindo Mare 22-yard field goal. Broncos 14–3.
- DEN – Derek Loville 11-yard run (Jason Elam kick). Broncos 21–3.

Third quarter

- DEN – Jason Elam 32-yard field goal. Broncos 24–3.

Fourth quarter

- DEN – Rod Smith 28-yard pass from John Elway (Jason Elam kick). Broncos 31–3.
- DEN – Neil Smith 79-yard fumble return (Jason Elam kick). Broncos 38–3.

Top passers

- MIA – Dan Marino – 26/37, 243 yards, 2 INT
- DEN – John Elway – 14/23, 182 yards, 1 TD, 1 INT

Top rushers

- MIA – Bernie Parmalee – 7 rushes, 14 yards
- DEN – Terrell Davis – 21 rushes, 199 yards, 2 TD

Top receivers

- MIA – O. J. McDuffie – 9 receptions, 118 yards
- DEN – Rod Smith – 4 receptions, 71 yards, 1 TD

Denver blew out Miami, outgaining them in rushing yards 250–14 and scoring touchdowns on their first three possessions.

On their opening drive, they took 7:55 off the clock with a 14-play, 92-yard drive on the way to a 1-yard touchdown run by Terrell Davis. Then after forcing a punt, they moved the ball much faster, driving 66 yards in four plays, including John Elway's 33-yard completion to Ed McCaffrey, and scoring with Davis' second touchdown on a 20-yard burst. Miami managed to respond with a 76-yard scoring drive in which Dan Marino completed three passes to O. J. McDuffie for 45 yards. The possession ended on a 22-yard field goal from Olindo Mare, making the score 14–3. However, the Broncos stormed right back, with Davis carrying the ball four times for 47 yards (including a 28-yard rush on the first play) on an 11-play, 87-yard drive that ended with Derek Loville's 11-yard touchdown run, giving them a 21–3 lead by halftime.

On the first play of the second half, Davis had a 62-yard run, setting up Jason Elam's field goal to make it 24–3. Miami prevented Denver from scoring for the rest of the quarter, but in the fourth quarter, Denver drove 52 yards and scored on Elway's 28-yard touchdown pass to Rod Smith. Then on Miami's ensuing drive, defensive end Neil Smith closed out the scoring by returning a fumble 79 yards for a touchdown.

Davis ran for 199 yards, caught a pass for seven yards, and scored two touchdowns. Elway threw for 182 yards and a touchdown, and rushed for 19 yards. Marino threw for 243 yards, but could not lead his team to a single touchdown and was intercepted twice. This was the only time that Hall of Famers Elway and Marino (both members of the famous 1983 draft class) faced each other in the playoffs; Elway was in his last season, and Marino in his next-to-last.

This game was Bill Carollo's first playoff game as a head referee.

This was the first postseason meeting between the Dolphins and Broncos.

=== Sunday, January 10, 1999 ===
==== AFC: New York Jets 34, Jacksonville Jaguars 24 ====
Jacksonville Jaguars vs. New York Jets – Game summary

Quarter	1	2	3	4	Total
Jaguars	0	7	7	10	24
Jets	7	10	14	3	34

at Giants Stadium, East Rutherford, New Jersey

- Game time: 12:30 p.m. EST
- Game weather: 39 °F (4 °C), clear
- Game attendance: 78,817
- Referee: Bob McElwee
- TV announcers (CBS): Verne Lundquist (play-by-play), Randy Cross (color commentator), and Michele Tafoya (sideline reporter)

Game information

First quarter

- NYJ – Keyshawn Johnson 21-yard pass from Vinny Testaverde (John Hall kick). Jets 7–0.

Second quarter

- NYJ – John Hall 52-yard field goal. Jets 10–0.
- NYJ – Keyshawn Johnson 10-yard run (John Hall kick). Jets 17–0.
- JAX – Jimmy Smith 52-yard pass from Mark Brunell (Mike Hollis kick). Jets 17–7.

Third quarter

- NYJ – Curtis Martin 1-yard run (John Hall kick). Jets 24–7.
- JAX – Keenan McCardell 3-yard pass from Mark Brunell (Mike Hollis kick). Jets 24–14.
- NYJ – Curtis Martin 1-yard run (John Hall kick). Jets 31–14.

Fourth quarter

- JAX – Jimmy Smith 19-yard pass from Mark Brunell (Mike Hollis kick). Jets 31–21.
- JAX – Mike Hollis 37-yard field goal. Jets 31–24.
- NYJ – John Hall 30-yard field goal. Jets 34–24.

Top passers

- JAX – Mark Brunell – 12/31, 156 yards, 3 TD, 3 INT
- NYJ – Vinny Testaverde – 24/36, 284 yards, TD, INT

Top rushers

- JAX – Fred Taylor – 20 rushes, 86 yards
- NYJ – Curtis Martin – 36 rushes, 124 yards, 2 TD

Top receivers

- JAX – Jimmy Smith – 5 receptions, 104 yards, 2 TD
- NYJ – Keyshawn Johnson – 9 receptions, 121 yards, TD

Quarterback Vinny Testaverde passed for 284 yards as the Jets held the ball for 39:16. Receiver Keyshawn Johnson caught nine passes for 121 yards and a touchdown, rushed for 28 yards and a touchdown, recovered a fumble, and intercepted a pass on defense near the end of the game when he was brought in as an extra defensive back. Jets running back Curtis Martin rushed for 124 yards, caught six passes for 58 yards, and scored two touchdowns. Jacksonville receiver Jimmy Smith caught five passes for 104 yards and two touchdowns. Quarterback Mark Brunell threw three touchdowns, but completed just 12 of 31 passes for 156 yards and was intercepted three times.

On the opening drive of the game, New York drove 70 yards in seven plays to score on Testaverde's 21-yard touchdown pass to Johnson. The rest of the first quarter would be scoreless, but on the second to last play, New York started a 59-yard drive that ended on John Hall's 51-yard field goal.

New York would go on to dominate the second quarter, holding the ball for all but 51 seconds of it. On their next drive, Martin lost a fumble that safety Chris Hudson initially recovered on the Jaguars 18-yard line. But during the return, he fumbled while attempting a lateral to teammate Dave Thomas as he was being tackled by Testaverde, and Johnson recovered the ball on New York's 34-yard line. The Jets then drove back into Jacksonville territory and scored with Johnson's 10-yard run. However, Brunell threw a 52-yard touchdown pass to Smith on the last play of the half, cutting the score to 17–7.

Early in the third quarter, Jets safety Corwin Brown intercepted a pass from Brunell on third down and returned it 40 yards. On the ensuing drive, Testaverde's 23-yard completion to Johnson set up a 1-yard touchdown run by Martin. However, Jacksonville's Reggie Barlow returned the ensuing kickoff 88 yards to the New York 4-yard line, setting up a 3-yard touchdown pass from Brunell to Keenan McCardell and cutting their deficit to 24–14. New York struck right back, with Testaverde throwing for 70 yards on a six-minute drive then ended with Martin's second touchdown run to put them up 31–14 going into the fourth quarter.

But Jacksonville refused to give up. First, a 29-yard run by Fred Taylor set off a 64-yard scoring drive that ended on Brunell's 19-yard touchdown pass to Smith. Then linebacker Kevin Hardy forced a fumble from Jets receiver Wayne Chrebet that was recovered by Thomas on the Jets 41-yard line, setting up a field goal from Mike Hollis and bringing the Jaguars to within one touchdown, 31–24. New York responded by driving inside the Jacksonville 20-yard line. With 2:30 left in the game, rookie safety Donovin Darius intercepted a pass from Testaverde in the end zone, but instead on kneeling down for a touchback, he attempted to return the ball and was tackled at the one-yard line. Jacksonville was unable to get a first down on their ensuing drive and turned the ball over on downs. A few plays later, Hall kicked a field goal to put the game away. Johnson then put the finishing touch on his exceptional performance by intercepting Brunell on the next play.

This was the first postseason meeting between the Jaguars and Jets.

==== NFC: Minnesota Vikings 41, Arizona Cardinals 21 ====
Arizona Cardinals vs. Minnesota Vikings – Game summary

Quarter	1	2	3	4	Total
Cardinals	0	7	7	7	21
Vikings	7	17	10	7	41

at Hubert H. Humphrey Metrodome, Minneapolis, Minnesota

- Game time: 4:00 p.m. EST/3:00 p.m. CST
- Game weather: Played indoors, domed stadium
- Game attendance: 63,760
- Referee: Tom White
- TV announcers (Fox): Pat Summerall (play-by-play), John Madden (color commentator), and Ron Pitts (sideline reporter)
- Recap, Game Book

Game information

First quarter

- MIN – Leroy Hoard 1-yard run (Gary Anderson kick). Vikings 7–0.

Second quarter

- MIN – Andrew Glover 15-yard pass from Randall Cunningham (Gary Anderson kick). Vikings 14–0.
- MIN – Gary Anderson 34-yard field goal. Vikings 17–0.
- ARI – Mario Bates 1-yard run (Chris Jacke kick). Vikings 17–7.
- MIN – Leroy Hoard 16-yard pass from Randall Cunningham (Gary Anderson kick). Vikings 24–7.

Third quarter

- ARI – Mario Bates 1-yard run (Chris Jacke kick). Vikings 24–14.
- MIN – Gary Anderson 20-yard field goal. Vikings 27–14.
- MIN – Randy Moss 2-yard pass from Randall Cunningham (Gary Anderson kick). Vikings 34–14.

Fourth quarter

- ARI – Mario Bates 1-yard run (Chris Jacke kick). Vikings 34–21.
- MIN – Leroy Hoard 6-yard run (Gary Anderson kick). Vikings 41–21.

Top passers

- ARI – Jake Plummer – 23/41, 242 yards, 2 INT
- MIN – Randall Cunningham – 17/27, 236 yards, 3 TD, INT

Top rushers

- ARI – Adrian Murrell – 15 rushes, 62 yards
- MIN – Robert Smith – 19 rushes, 124 yards

Top receivers

- ARI – Rob Moore – 6 receptions, 91 yards
- MIN – Cris Carter – 5 receptions, 82 yards

Running back Robert Smith led the Vikings to a victory as he ran for a team-playoff-record 124 yards and caught two passes for 14 yards. Fullback Leroy Hoard scored a franchise playoff record three touchdowns, while quarterback Randall Cunningham completed 17 of 27 passes for 236 yards and three touchdowns with an interception. Arizona quarterback Jake Plummer threw for more yards than Cunningham, but was intercepted twice by Robert Griffith. Running back Mario Bates scored three touchdowns, but had only four rushing yards.

Minnesota opened up the game with a 12-play, 80-yard scoring drive, featuring a 21-yard completion from Cunningham to receiver David Palmer on third and 6. Hoard's 1-yard touchdown run finished the drive and gave the Vikings a 7–0 lead. Later in the quarter, the Vikings drove all the way to the Cardinals 7-yard line, but on the first play of the second quarter, cornerback Aeneas Williams intercepted a pass intended for Randy Moss in the end zone and returned it 47 yards. However, Griffith returned the favor a few plays later by intercepting Plummer and returning the ball 31 yards to the Vikings 38. On the next play, Cunningham completed a 45-yard pass to Moss, and eventually finished the drive with a 15-yard touchdown pass to tight end Andrew Glover, making the score 14–0. On the first play after the ensuing kickoff, Griffith intercepted another pass from Plummer and returned this one 15 yards to the Cardinals 16-yard line, setting up a 34-yard field goal by Gary Anderson that gave the Vikings a 17–0 lead before Arizona had made a single completion or gained a first down. Aided by four Vikings penalties, Arizona managed to respond with a 12-play, 80-yard drive to score on a 1-yard touchdown run from Bates, but Smith's three carries for 42 yards on the ensuing drive set up Hoard's 16-yard touchdown reception, increasing the Vikings' lead to 24–7 by halftime.

Arizona regrouped on their opening drive of the second half, driving 80 yards in 14 plays, including a 23-yard reception by Rob Moore on third and 4, to score on Bates' 1-yard touchdown run, cutting their deficit to 24–14. However, the Vikings would go on to dominate the rest of the half, starting with Cunningham's 45-yard completion to Cris Carter that set up a 20-yard Anderson field goal. The next time Arizona got the ball, Plummer fumbled a snap that was recovered by Minnesota's Antonio Banks on the Cardinals 10-yard line, leading to Cunningham's third touchdown pass of the day, a 3-yard pass to Moss.

In the fourth quarter, the Cardinals took advantage of a 36-yard punt return by Eric Metcalf that gave them a first down on the Vikings 25-yard line, converting it into Bates' third 1-yard touchdown run to make the score 34–21. But the Vikings subsequently put the game away with a 12-play, 73-yard drive to score on Hoard's 6-yard touchdown with 4:33 left on the clock.

Moore was the top receiver of the game with six receptions for 91 yards. Metcalf had 66 kick return yards, 36 punt return yards, and two receptions for nine yards.

The Cardinals 9–7 record and Wild Card win in Dallas ultimately did not signal a turnaround for the long-troubled franchise. They fell to 6–10 in the following year and would not make the playoffs again until 2008, when they advanced to Super Bowl XLIII.

This was the second postseason meeting between the Cardinals and Vikings. Minnesota won the only prior meeting when the Cardinals were in St. Louis.

Previous playoff games
Minnesota leads 1–0 in all-time playoff games

1974

St. Louis Cardinals 14 @ Minnesota Vikings 30

1974 NFC Divisional playoffs

== Conference championships ==
=== Sunday, January 17, 1999 ===
==== NFC: Atlanta Falcons 30, Minnesota Vikings 27 (OT) ====
Atlanta Falcons vs. Minnesota Vikings – Game summary

Quarter	1	2	3	4	OT	Total
Falcons	7	7	3	10	3	30
Vikings	7	13	0	7	0	27

at Hubert H. Humphrey Metrodome, Minneapolis, Minnesota

- Game time: 12:30 p.m. EST/11:30 a.m. CST
- Game weather: Played indoors, domed stadium
- Game attendance: 64,060
- Referee: Walt Coleman
- TV announcers (Fox): Pat Summerall (play-by-play), John Madden (color commentator), Ron Pitts, and Bill Maas (sideline reporters)
- Recap, Game Book

Game information

First quarter

- ATL – Jamal Anderson 5-yard pass from Chris Chandler (Morten Andersen kick). Falcons 7–0.
- MIN – Randy Moss 31-yard pass from Randall Cunningham (Gary Anderson kick). Tied 7–7.

Second quarter

- MIN – Gary Anderson 29-yard field goal. Vikings 10–7.
- MIN – Randall Cunningham 1-yard run (Gary Anderson kick). Vikings 17–7.
- MIN – Gary Anderson 35-yard field goal. Vikings 20–7.
- ATL – Tony Martin 14-yard pass from Chris Chandler (Morten Andersen kick). Vikings 20–14.

Third quarter

- ATL – Morten Andersen 27-yard field goal. Vikings 20–17.

Fourth quarter

- MIN – Matthew Hatchette 5-yard pass from Randall Cunningham (Gary Anderson kick). Vikings 27–17.
- ATL – Morten Andersen 24-yard field goal. Vikings 27–20.
- ATL – Terance Mathis 16-yard pass from Chris Chandler (Morten Andersen kick). Tied 27–27.

Overtime

- ATL – Morten Andersen 38-yard field goal. Falcons 30–27.

Top passers

- ATL – Chris Chandler – 27/43, 340 yards, 3 TD
- MIN – Randall Cunningham – 29/48, 266 yards, 2 TD

Top rushers

- ATL – Jamal Anderson – 23 rushes, 67 yards
- MIN – Robert Smith – 21 rushes, 71 yards

Top receivers

- ATL – Tony Martin – 5 receptions, 129 yards
- MIN – Randy Moss – 6 receptions, 75 yards, TD

This was the first conference championship game to feature two teams who play their home games in domes. The 14–2 Falcons came into the game as 11-point underdogs, but managed to overcome a 13-point deficit (the largest comeback in an NFC Championship Game until the Falcons themselves blew a 17-point lead against the 49ers in 2012) and win an extremely competitive game late in overtime, making Minnesota the first 15–1 team ever to fail to reach the Super Bowl (a dubious feat since matched by two other 15–1 teams, the 2004 Pittsburgh Steelers and the 2011 Green Bay Packers). The Vikings had set an NFL record with 556 points and won their nine previous home games by an average of 23 points, but they could not win this game despite maintaining a lead for nearly all of the time in regulation. For good measure, this was Atlanta's first away victory against the Vikings in ten attempts, including the postseason, dating back to 1966. Fox Sports ranked it the third most exciting NFC Championship Game ever.

Atlanta took the opening kickoff and moved the ball 76 yards in 12 plays to score with Chris Chandler's 5-yard pass to Jamal Anderson. Aided by a 30-yard pass interference penalty on Falcons cornerback Ray Buchanan, Minnesota struck right back on their first drive with Randall Cunningham's 31-yard scoring strike to Randy Moss.

In the second quarter, Vikings linebacker Ed McDaniel recovered a fumble from Harold Green on the Minnesota 40-yard line, which the team converted into a Gary Anderson field goal. Then on the first play of Atlanta's following drive, Orlando Thomas forced a fumble from tight end O. J. Santiago that Robert Griffith recovered and returned nine yards to the Falcons 33-yard line. Cunningham completed an 18-yard pass to Moss on the next play, and eventually finished the drive with a 1-yard touchdown run that increased his team's lead to 17–7 with five minutes left in the half. Atlanta had to punt after three plays on their ensuing drive, and Dan Stryzinski's 42-yard kick gave Minnesota good field position on their own 43-yard line. The Vikings blew a chance at another touchdown when Moss dropped a pass in the end zone, but Anderson kicked another field goal to make the score 20–7. After forcing another Atlanta punt, Stryzinski's 44-yard kick sent the ball back to the Vikings on their own 18-yard line with 1:17 left in the half. Rather than simply run out the clock, the team decided to attempt to make a drive for points, but their gamble backfired horribly as Falcons defensive end Chuck Smith forced a fumble from Cunningham that Atlanta defensive end Travis Hall recovered on the Vikings 14, setting up Chandler's 14-yard touchdown pass to Terance Mathis to cut their deficit to 20–14 by the end of the half. It was the turning point for the Falcons, as the game's momentum began to shift their way (albeit subtly).

Atlanta forced the Vikings to punt on the opening drive of the second half, and two plays by receiver Tim Dwight, a 26-yard punt return and a 21-yard run, set up Morten Andersen's 27-yard field goal to cut their deficit to three points. The Vikings countered on their ensuing possession, driving 82 yards in 15 plays and scoring on Matthew Hatchette's 5-yard reception (his only touchdown of the season) to make the score 27–17 with just over 13 minutes left in the fourth quarter. Receiver Cris Carter made two big receptions on the drive, converting a third and 10 with a 12-yard catch and later hauling in a 17-yard gain on third and 8.

Atlanta responded with Chandler's 70-yard completion to Tony Martin setting up a score on Andersen's 24-yard field goal that narrowed the gap to 27–20 with 11:02 left in the game. After a punt from each team, Atlanta got a chance to score when defensive end Shane Dronett recovered a fumbled snap from Cunningham on the Vikings 30-yard line. However, they turned the ball over on downs with Chandler's incomplete pass on a fourth and 4 attempt with six minutes left in regulation.

Minnesota then drove to the Falcons' 20-yard line, setting up a 38-yard field goal attempt for Anderson, who had not missed a field goal all season. Another successful kick would have wrapped up the NFC title for Minnesota, but Anderson's kick sailed wide left, giving the ball back to Atlanta with 2:07 left and new life. Chandler then led his team down to the Vikings 16-yard line, including a 29-yard completion to seldom-used receiver Ronnie Harris. Following a near interception by Griffith, Mathis' 16-yard touchdown catch tied the game with 49 seconds left. Vikings coach Dennis Green then chose to kneel down and sent the game into overtime. By this point, the Vikings had lost five starting players to injury, including Hall of Fame defensive tackle John Randle.

After the first three possessions of overtime ended in punts, Vikings punter Mitch Berger's 52-yard kick gave Atlanta the ball at their own 9-yard line. Chandler, now visibly limping due to an ankle injury, completed two passes to Santiago for gains of 15 and 26 yards on a 70-yard drive to the Minnesota 21-yard line where Andersen kicked a 38-yard field goal to win the game.

Chandler had one of the best games of his career, throwing for 340 yards and three touchdowns. Martin caught five passes for 129 yards. Cunningham also had a solid performance, throwing for 266 yards and two touchdowns, while also rushing for 13 yards and a touchdown on the ground. Dwight had 173 all-purpose yards (four kick returns for 110 yards, two punt returns for 35 yards, and three carries for 28 yards).

This was the first NFC championship game since 1987 and 1991 not to feature the San Francisco 49ers, Dallas Cowboys or the Green Bay Packers as they had been in the 1988-1990, 1992-1997 championship games.

Numerous references to this game are made in "Little Minnesota", an episode from the television series How I Met Your Mother.

The game was featured as one of the NFL's Greatest Games as Andersen and Anderson.

This was the first NFC Championship Game to go to overtime (since, there have already been five other instances, with the 2007, 2009, 2011, 2014 and 2018 NFC Championship Games going to overtime).

This was the second postseason meeting between the Falcons and Vikings. Minnesota won the only prior meeting.

Previous playoff games
Minnesota leads 1–0 in all-time playoff games

1982

Atlanta Falcons 24 @ Minnesota Vikings 30

1982 NFC First Round playoffs

==== AFC: Denver Broncos 23, New York Jets 10 ====
New York Jets vs. Denver Broncos – Game summary

Quarter	1	2	3	4	Total
Jets	0	3	7	0	10
Broncos	0	0	20	3	23

at Mile High Stadium, Denver, Colorado

- Game time: 4:00 p.m. EST/2:00 p.m. MST
- Game weather: 51 °F (11 °C), windy
- Game attendance: 75,482
- Referee: Ed Hochuli
- TV announcers (CBS): Greg Gumbel (play-by-play), Phil Simms (color commentator), Armen Keteyian, and Bonnie Bernstein (sideline reporters)

Game information

First quarter

- No scoring plays.

Second quarter

- NYJ – John Hall 32-yard field goal. Jets 3–0.

Third quarter

- NYJ – Curtis Martin 1-yard run (John Hall kick). Jets 10–0.
- DEN – Howard Griffith 11-yard pass from John Elway (Jason Elam kick). Jets 10–7.
- DEN – Jason Elam 44-yard field goal. Tied 10–10.

Fourth quarter

- DEN – Jason Elam 48-yard field goal. Broncos 13–10.
- DEN – Terrell Davis 31-yard run (Jason Elam kick). Broncos 20–10.
- DEN – Jason Elam 35-yard field goal. Broncos 23–10.

Top passers

- NYJ – Vinny Testaverde – 31/52, 356 yards, 2 INT
- DEN – John Elway – 13/34, 173 yards, 1 TD

Top rushers

- NYJ – Curtis Martin – 13 rushes, 14 yards, 1 TD
- DEN – Terrell Davis – 32 rushes, 167 yards, 1 TD

Top receivers

- NYJ – Wayne Chrebet – 8 receptions, 121 yards
- DEN – Ed McCaffrey – 3 receptions, 66 yards

In John Elway's last home game of his career, he completed only 13 of 34 passes. However, running back Terrell Davis, the NFL MVP in 1998, ran for 167 yards and a touchdown, and Denver capitalized on six turnovers (two interceptions by Darrien Gordon and four fumbles) by the Jets to overcome a 10–0 deficit. Jets running back Curtis Martin was held to just 14 rushing yards on 13 carries. New York quarterback Vinny Testaverde threw for 356 yards, but no touchdowns and was intercepted twice. Gordon returned five punts for 79 yards and two interceptions for 48.

Both teams blew scoring opportunities throughout the first half. The Jets took the opening kickoff and drove deep into Denver territory, only to have John Hall miss a 42-yard field goal attempt. New York forced the Broncos to punt on their ensuing possession, and Dave Meggett gave his team good field position with a 33-yard return. However, Martin lost a fumble on the Broncos 44-yard line and cornerback Tyrone Braxton recovered it. Then Denver took the ball and drove all the way to the Jets 1-yard line, only to give it back when linebacker Mo Lewis deflected Elway's pass on a fourth down conversion attempt.

In the second quarter, Broncos punter Tom Rouen fumbled a snap and was downed on the Denver 43-yard line. New York subsequently drove to the 18-yard line, but then fullback Keith Byars fumbled the ball and linebacker John Mobley recovered it. Denver had to punt on their next drive, and Meggett returned the punt 10 yards to the Jets 40-yard line. This time, New York was finally able to take advantage of good field position, as Testaverde's completions to Wayne Chrebet and Dedric Ward for gains of 20 and 26 yards set up Hall's 32-yard field goal to give the team a 3–0 lead on the last play of the first half.

In the third quarter, Jets tight end Blake Spence blocked a punt and recovered it on the Broncos 1-yard line. On the next play, Martin scored a 1-yard touchdown run to increase their lead to 10–0. However, Denver stormed back with 23 unanswered points. On their ensuing kickoff, Vaughn Hebron returned the ball 28 yards to the Denver 36. Then Elway completed a 47-yard pass to Ed McCaffrey on the Jets 17-yard line. Two plays later, his 11-yard touchdown pass to Howard Griffith cut the score to 10–7. Then the Broncos caught a lucky break when the ensuing kickoff bounced back in their direction and was recovered by linebacker Keith Burns, setting up Jason Elam's 44-yard field goal to tie the game. Then after forcing a punt, Gordon returned the ball 11 yards to the Denver 44. The Broncos moved the ball 27 yards in eight plays, including a 20-yard run by Davis, to score on Elam's 48-yard field goal, giving the Broncos their first lead of the game. With time running out in the third quarter, Gordon's 36-yard punt return gave the Broncos great field position on the Jets 38-yard line. A few plays later, Davis' 31-yard touchdown burst 18 seconds before the fourth quarter gave them a 20–10 lead.

Denver went on to dominate the fourth quarter, forcing three turnovers. On their first one possession of the quarter, Broncos safety Steve Atwater forced and recovered a fumble from receiver Alex Van Dyke. After the next three drives ended in punts, Gordon intercepted a pass from Testaverde and returned it 18 yards to the Jets 18-yard line, where Elam kicked a 35-yard field goal to close out the scoring. On New York's next drive, Gordon recorded his second interception with 2:47 left on the clock.

This game would be Bill Parcells' only career loss in a conference championship game.

This was the first postseason meeting between the Jets and Broncos.

== Super Bowl XXXIII: Denver Broncos 34, Atlanta Falcons 19 ==
Super Bowl XXXIII – Denver Broncos vs. Atlanta Falcons – Game summary

Quarter	1	2	3	4	Total
Broncos (AFC)	7	10	0	17	34
Falcons (NFC)	3	3	0	13	19

at Pro Player Stadium, Miami

- Date: January 31, 1999
- Game attendance: 74,803
- Referee: Bernie Kukar
- TV announcers (Fox): Pat Summerall (play-by-play), John Madden (color commentator), Ron Pitts, and Bill Maas (sideline reporters)

This was the first Super Bowl meeting between the Broncos and Falcons.
