= Jeremy Newberry =

American football player (born 1976)

No. 62
- Positions: Center, guard

Personal information
- Born: March 23, 1976 (age 50); Antioch, California, U.S.
- Listed height: 6 ft 5 in (1.96 m)
- Listed weight: 315 lb (143 kg)

Career information
- High school: Antioch
- College: California
- NFL draft: 1998: 2nd round, 58th overall pick

Career history
- San Francisco 49ers (1998–2006); Oakland Raiders (2007); San Diego Chargers (2008); Atlanta Falcons (2009)*
- * Offseason or practice squad member only

Awards and highlights
- 2× Pro Bowl (2001, 2002); Second-team All-Pac-10 (1997)

Career NFL statistics
- Games played: 120
- Games started: 107
- Fumble recoveries: 1
- Stats at Pro Football Reference

Jeremy David Newberry (born March 23, 1976) is an American former professional football player who was a center in the National Football League (NFL). He was selected by the San Francisco 49ers in the second round of the 1998 NFL draft. He was born in Antioch, California, and played college football for the California Golden Bears.

Newberry has also played for the Oakland Raiders and San Diego Chargers.

Currently, Newberry works as the KPIX 5 NFL Analyst.

== Professional career ==
=== San Francisco 49ers ===
Newberry joined the 49ers in 1998, but missed the first nine weeks of the season after suffering a torn ACL in offseason mini-camp. He was inactive for the rest of the season as well. In 1999 he started all 16 games, first at right tackle then at right guard. In 2000 he started every game again, taking over center duties when Chris Dalman suffered a career-ending neck injury in offseason training camp. In 2000, his first season playing center in the NFL, the offensive line was third in the league, allowing only 25 sacks. Newberry was put on injured reserve after major microfracture surgery on his left knee in August 2006.

Newberry was regarded as a tough, tenacious blocker with great technique in both run and pass protection. He was also the leader of the offensive line. On two occasions, Newberry was awarded the 49ers' "Bobb McKittrick award", which is given to the team's offensive lineman who best exemplifies dedication, excellence and commitment.

=== Oakland Raiders ===
On March 6, 2007, Newberry was signed by the Oakland Raiders. He started all 14 games in which he appeared for the 4–12 Raiders that season, replacing Jake Grove, before becoming a free agent the following offseason.

=== San Diego Chargers ===
On June 2, 2008, Newberry signed with the San Diego Chargers. He started three games for the Chargers.

=== Atlanta Falcons ===
Newberry signed with the Atlanta Falcons on June 15, 2009. In July 2009, he retired. The Atlanta Falcons organization did not confirm the reports.
