= Pat McPherson =

American football coach (born 1969)

Carolina Panthers
- Title: Tight ends coach

Personal information
- Born: April 15, 1969 (age 57); Santa Clara, California, U.S.

Career information
- Position: Linebacker
- High school: Bellarmine College Prep (San Jose, California)
- College: UCLA (1987–1990); Santa Clara (1991–1992)

Career history
- Denver Broncos (1998–2008); Defensive assistant (1998); Offensive assistant (1999–2002); Quarterbacks coach (2003–2006); Tight ends coach (2007–2008); Seattle Seahawks (2010–2023) Tight ends coach; Carolina Panthers (2024–present) Tight ends coach

Awards and highlights
- 2× Super Bowl champion (XXXIII, XLVIII)

Patrick McPherson (born April 15, 1969) is an American professional football coach who is the tight ends coach for the Carolina Panthers of the National Football League (NFL). In 2010, he joined the Seahawks as tight ends coach after 11 years with the Denver Broncos, where he was both the quarterbacks and tight ends coach. He joined the Broncos coaching staff in 1998, as a defensive assistant. In 1999, he became an offensive assistant. During his time as the quarterbacks coach from 2003 until 2006 his guidance lead Jake Plummer to set several single-season franchise records, including passing yards. He joined the Seabawks in 2010. During his time with Seattle, he won his second Super Bowl title when the Seahawks defeated his former team the Denver Broncos in Super Bowl XLVIII.

On February 15, 2024, McPherson was named as the tight ends coach for the Carolina Panthers.

McPherson was a linebacker and captain of the football team at Santa Clara University, where he received his bachelor's degree in English and an M.B.A. His father, Bill McPherson, was a long-time NFL assistant coach.
