= Steve Mariucci =

American football coach and analyst

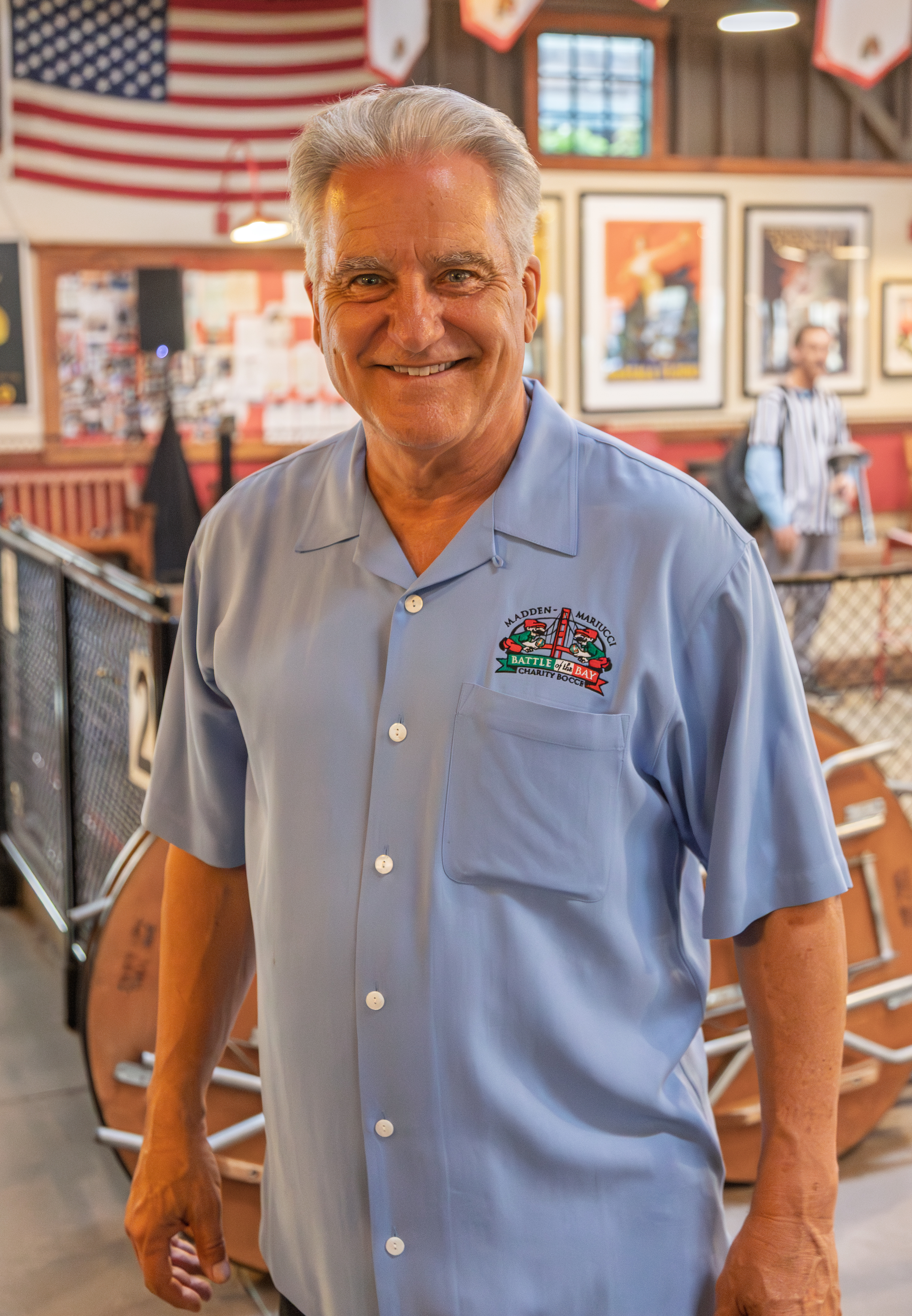
- Mariucci in 2026

Profile
- Position: Quarterback

Personal information
- Born: November 4, 1955 (age 71); Iron Mountain, Michigan, U.S.

Career information
- High school: Iron Mountain
- College: Northern Michigan

Career history

Playing
- Hamilton Tiger-Cats (1978)*
- * Offseason or practice squad member only

Coaching
- Northern Michigan (1978–1979) Running backs coach; Cal State Fullerton (1980–1982) Quarterbacks coach; Louisville (1983–1984) Wide receivers coach; Orlando Renegades (1985) Wide receivers coach; USC (1986) Wide receivers coach & special teams coach; California (1987–1991); Wide receivers coach & special teams coach (1987–1989); Offensive coordinator (1990–1991); Green Bay Packers (1992–1995) Quarterbacks coach; California (1996) Head coach; San Francisco 49ers (1997–2002) Head coach; Detroit Lions (2003–2005) Head coach

Awards and highlights
- NCAA Division II national champion (1975)

Head coaching record
- Regular season: NFL: 72–67 (.518); NCAA: 6–6 (.500)
- Postseason: NFL: 3–4 (.429); Bowl games: 0–1 (.000)
- Career: NFL: 75–71 (.514); NCAA: 6–7 (.462)
- Coaching profile at Pro Football Reference

Stephen Ray Mariucci (born November 4, 1955), nicknamed "Mooch", is an American sportscaster and former football coach who was the head coach of two National Football League (NFL) teams, the San Francisco 49ers (1997–2002) and the Detroit Lions (2003–2005), and for a year at the University of California, Berkeley.

== Early life ==
Mariucci was born and raised in Iron Mountain, Michigan, in the Upper Peninsula, where he met best friend and current Michigan State University basketball head coach Tom Izzo. Both attended Iron Mountain High where they were teammates on the football, basketball, and track teams.

At Northern Michigan University (NMU) in Marquette, Mariucci and Izzo were roommates. Mariucci was a three-time All-America (Division II) quarterback. As a sophomore in 1975, he led the Wildcats to three postseason wins and the national championship. Mariucci signed with the Hamilton Tiger-Cats of the Canadian Football League in May 1978, but was released a month later on June 9.

== Early career ==
He began his coaching career at his alma mater (1978–79), and moved to Cal State Fullerton (1980–82) and Louisville (1983–84). Mariucci's first pro position was as a receivers coach for the USFL's Orlando Renegades in 1985. Later that fall, he had a brief stint in the NFL with the Los Angeles Rams as quality control coach.

Mariucci returned to college football and joined the USC staff in 1986 and coached wide receiver Ken Henry to a season where he had 807 yards with 7 touchdowns; WR Randy Tanner also had 408 yards with 3 touchdowns.

He then moved to the coaching staff at the University of California, Berkeley (Cal) in 1987. that first season, WR Brian Bedford had 515 yards with 4 touchdowns and WR Mike Ford had 479 yards with 3 touchdowns. In 1989, WR Brian Treggs had 746 yards with 4 touchdowns.

In 1990 and 1991, he was the Golden Bears' offensive coordinator. Quarterback Mike Pawlawski threw for 2,069 yards with 17 touchdowns and RBs Anthony Wallace and Russell White combined to run for 2,002 yards with 16 touchdowns. In 1991, Pawlawski threw for 2,517 yards with 21 touchdowns and White ran for 1,177 yards with 14 touchdowns; WR Sean Dawkins had 723 yards with 11 touchdowns.

Mariucci then moved to the NFL, and became the quarterback coach for the Green Bay Packers in 1992 under new head coach Mike Holmgren. After four years with the Packers, he returned to Cal as head coach in 1996 and went 6–6, ending with an Aloha Bowl loss to Navy.

== Coaching career in professional football ==
Following his season with the Golden Bears, Mariucci was considered a leading candidate for several NFL head coaching positions, and was hired by the San Francisco 49ers to succeed George Seifert.

In his first season in 1997, the 49ers went 13–3 during the regular season, earning home-field advantage in the playoffs in the National Football Conference (NFC). After defeating the Minnesota Vikings in the divisional round, San Francisco hosted the Green Bay Packers in the NFC Championship Game, but lost 23–10 in a muddy, rainy contest at Candlestick Park. The defeat was the 49ers' fourth NFC title loss of the 1990s, following losses to the New York Giants in 1990 and the Dallas Cowboys in 1992 and 1993, and it was their third playoff loss to the Packers in as many seasons. In 1998, the 49ers posted a 12–4 record and returned to the playoffs as a wild-card team, finally beating the Green Bay Packers in the Wild Card game, but lost 20–18 in the divisional round to the eventual NFC champion Atlanta Falcons. The Wild Card Game saw Terrell Owens drop several passes but redeem himself with The Catch II, scoring the winning touchdown. Two highly disappointing seasons followed, with the team finishing 4-12 and 6-10 in 1999 and 2000 respectively. The 49ers bounced back in 2001, posting a 12-4 record and returning to the playoffs, only to be eliminated by the Green Bay Packers.

Mariucci's final season in San Francisco was 2002. The 49ers won the NFC West with a 10–6 record and beat the New York Giants in a wild-card game, posting the third-biggest comeback playoff victory in NFL history (second biggest at the time). However, they were crushed 31–6 by the eventual Super Bowl champion Tampa Bay Buccaneers in the divisional round. On January 15, 2003, the 49ers fired Mariucci, reportedly after Mariucci lost a power struggle with general manager Terry Donahue. As San Francisco's coach, he compiled a 60–43 (.583) record, while his teams earned playoff berths four times. His firing caused an uproar among 49ers fans. The 49ers struggled heavily following Mariucci's departure, finishing without a winning season for the subsequent eight seasons.

Mariucci was named the Detroit Lions' 22nd head coach on February 4, 2003, and was fired on November 28, 2005. In his abbreviated three seasons in Detroit, he compiled a disappointing 15–28 (.349) record. Mariucci's troubles in Detroit were partially attributed by many fans and experts to poor personnel evaluations by then Lions' general manager Matt Millen, who had signed Mariucci to a five-year $25 million guaranteed contract, the NFL's highest coaching contract at the time. During his time in Detroit, the Lions finished no higher than third in their division and never contended for a playoff berth. The decision to fire Mariucci came after a 27–7 blowout loss on national television on Thanksgiving Day to the Atlanta Falcons in 2005.

During the Brett Favre–Green Bay Packers dispute throughout the 2008 off-season, Favre criticized the Packers for not interviewing Mariucci for their head coaching job in 2006. Mariucci, who previously worked with Favre, was figured to be a great candidate for the West Coast Offense style played in Green Bay.

Mariucci is one of thirteen head coaches since the AFL–NFL merger in 1970 to lead his team to a division title in his first season. Mariucci established an NFL mark for consecutive wins by a rookie head coach with an 11-game winning streak, which has since been trumped by Jim Caldwell's 14–0 start with the Indianapolis Colts during the 2009 season.

Throughout his career, Mariucci coached a high number of players (9) inducted into the Pro Football Hall of Fame in Canton, Ohio. Hall of Fame inductees coached by Mariucci as either their position or head coach include: Tony Gonzalez, Brett Favre, Steve Young, Jerry Rice, Kevin Greene, Rod Woodson, Chris Doleman, Charles Haley, and Terrell Owens.

== Head coaching record ==
=== College ===
Year	Team	Overall	Conference	Standing	Bowl/playoffs
California Golden Bears (Pacific-10 Conference) (1996)
1996	California	6–6	3–5	5th	L Aloha
California:		6–6	3–5		
Total:		6–6			

=== NFL ===
Team	Year	Regular season					Postseason			
Team	Year	Won	Lost	Ties	Win %	Finish	Won	Lost	Win %	Result
SF	1997	13	3	0	.813	1st in NFC West	1	1	.500	Lost to Green Bay Packers in NFC Championship Game
SF	1998	12	4	0	.750	2nd in NFC West	1	1	.500	Lost to Atlanta Falcons in NFC Divisional Game
SF	1999	4	12	0	.250	4th in NFC West	–	–	–	–
SF	2000	6	10	0	.375	4th in NFC West	–	–	–	–
SF	2001	12	4	0	.750	2nd in NFC West	0	1	.000	Lost to Green Bay Packers in NFC Wild Card Game
SF	2002	10	6	0	.625	1st in NFC West	1	1	.500	Lost to Tampa Bay Buccaneers in NFC Divisional Game
SF Total		57	39	0	.594		3	4	.429	
DET	2003	5	11	0	.313	4th in NFC North	–	–	–	–
DET	2004	6	10	0	.375	3rd in NFC North	–	–	–	–
DET	2005	4	7	0	.364	(Fired)	–	–	–	–
DET Total		15	28	0	.349		–	–	–	
Total		72	67	0	.518		3	4	.429	

== After coaching ==
Since being fired by the Detroit Lions, Mariucci has not returned to coaching. He has since been hired by NFL Network to work on their show NFL GameDay and contribute as an analyst on NFL Network's four-hour pregame show "NFL GameDay Morning," as well as provide follow-up reports from the late afternoon and Sunday night matchups on "NFL GameDay Highlights."

Mariucci now resides in Monte Sereno, California. He has four children: Stephen, Tyler, Adam, and Brielle. His eldest son Tyler is Senior Associate Athletics Director for Development at Fresno State University. Adam works in Real Estate in New York City and his son Stephen is country music artist, Stephen Ray.

In 2011, Mariucci founded the Mariucci Family Foundation. It is a 501(c)(3) non-profit organization dedicated to providing opportunities and support for underserved youth and families.

Shortly after Pete Carroll left University of Southern California (USC), Mariucci was reportedly seen on campus, and ESPN's Adam Schefter reported shortly thereafter that Mariucci was a candidate for the Trojans head coach position and that the university had "made contact" with the announcer.

Following the dismissal of Arkansas head coach Bobby Petrino in April 2012, Mariucci was recommended as a replacement by Carroll.

Mariucci expressed interest in the head coaching job of the San Diego Chargers in late 2012 with speculation of Norv Turner's departure from San Diego.

Mariucci grew up a fan of the Packers, and remained one during and after his NFL career. His family's Packers season tickets are in Mariucci's name.

== Philanthropy ==
In 1998 Mariucci partnered with a local bocce club and restaurant to create a "Battle of the Bay" charity tournament. The tournament later added another former NFL coach, John Madden. The tournament has raised money for local groups such at the Los Gatos-Monte Sereno Police Department and Los Gatos High School, among others.
