= Tim Hanshaw =

American football player (born 1970)

No. 77
- Position: Guard

Personal information
- Born: April 27, 1970 (age 56); Spokane, Washington, U.S.
- Listed height: 6 ft 5 in (1.96 m)
- Listed weight: 300 lb (136 kg)

Career information
- High school: West Valley (Spokane)
- College: BYU
- NFL draft: 1995: 4th round, 127th overall pick

Career history
- San Francisco 49ers (1995–1998)

Career NFL statistics
- Games played: 30
- Games started: 3
- Stats at Pro Football Reference

Tim Hanshaw (born April 27, 1970) is an American former professional football player who was a guard for the San Francisco 49ers of the National Football League (NFL). He played college football for the BYU Cougars and was signed by the 49ers as a fourth round pick in the 1995 NFL draft.

== Early life ==
Hanshaw was born in 1970 to Robert and Rosette Hanshaw in Spokane, Washington. He played high school football, basketball, and track for West Valley High School (Spokane, Washington).

== College career ==
Hanshaw graduated Brigham Young University with a degree in History He played for BYU football in the 1988, and 1991-1994 seasons. In 1988 Hanshaw played on the Junior Varsity team before he served as a missionary for the Church of Jesus Christ of Latter-day Saints in Stockholm, Sweden from 1989-1990 where towards the end of his missionary service he was almost killed in his living quarters. He was Redshirted in the 1991 season and then medically redshirted later in the 1991 season. He first started for the 1992 BYU Cougars football team as an offensive guard after another player's mid-season injury.

== Professional career ==
Hanshaw was selected in the fourth round of the 1995 NFL draft as the 127th pick for the San Francisco 49ers. He played 30 games and started in 3.

Hanshaw participated in the Mormon Day ceremony hosted by the San Francisco Giants at Candlestick Park with Latter-day Saint teammates Steve Young, Ty Detmer and Greg Clark.

Hanshaw's son Bentley served a two-year church mission in Australia and plays Tight End for BYU's football team.
