= Lance Schulters =

American football player (born 1975)

Personal information
- Born: May 27, 1975 (age 51); Guyana
- Listed height: 6 ft 2 in (1.88 m)
- Listed weight: 202 lb (92 kg)

Career information
- Position: Defensive back (No. 30, 31)
- High school: Canarsie (Brooklyn, New York, U.S.)
- College: Hofstra
- NFL draft: 1998: 4th round, 119th overall pick

Career history

Playing
- San Francisco 49ers (1998–2001); Tennessee Titans (2002–2004); Miami Dolphins (2005); Atlanta Falcons (2006); Miami Dolphins (2007); New Orleans Saints (2008)*
- * Offseason or practice squad member only

Coaching
- Atlanta Falcons (2020) Defensive assistant; Los Angeles Rams (2021–2022) Defensive assistant; Atlanta Falcons (2024–present) Defensive assistant

Awards and highlights
- Super Bowl champion (LVI); Pro Bowl (1999)

Career NFL statistics
- Total tackles: 539
- Sacks: 7.5
- Forced fumbles: 4
- Fumble recoveries: 4
- Interceptions: 19
- Defensive touchdowns: 1
- Stats at Pro Football Reference

Lance A. Schulters (born May 27, 1975) is an American football coach and former player who was a defensive assistant coach for the Atlanta Falcons of the National Football League (NFL). He played in the NFL as a safety for 10 seasons. Schulters played college football for the Hofstra Flying Dutchmen (now Pride). He was selected by the San Francisco 49ers in the fourth round of the 1998 NFL draft.

A Pro Bowl selection with the 49ers in 1999, Schulters also played for the Tennessee Titans, Miami Dolphins, Atlanta Falcons and New Orleans Saints.

== College career ==
Schulters attended Canarsie High School, where he played football under coach Mike Camardese. Schulters moved on to Nassau Community College in Garden City, New York, becoming a two-year starter before transferring to Hofstra in 1996. He played two seasons for the Flying Dutchmen, becoming a two-time All-America selection and the 1997 I-AA Independent Defensive Player of the Year. He was inducted into the Hofstra Athletics Hall of Fame in 2013.

== Professional career ==
=== San Francisco 49ers ===
Schulters played the first four seasons of his career with the San Francisco 49ers. After winning the starting free safety job in the first week of the 1999–2000 season from aging Pro Bowl safety Merton Hanks, Schulters played a major role in the 49ers' first win of the season, in Week 2 against the New Orleans Saints at home, intercepting a pass from Billy Joe Hobert and returning it 64 yards for a dramatic touchdown that broke a 21–21 tie with 1:31 left in the game. Schulters finished the season with six interceptions returned for 121 yards while starting in 13 games for the 49ers, earning himself a trip to the Pro Bowl. Schulters played in San Francisco for two more seasons, and was part of a playoff team with a regular-season record of 12–4 in his last year before signing with the Tennessee Titans after the 2001–02 season.

=== Tennessee Titans ===
Schulters played three seasons with the Tennessee Titans. He was cut by the Titans prior to the 2005 season.

=== First stint with Dolphins ===
In 2005, Schulters signed with the Miami Dolphins, recording four interceptions and 77 tackles on the season.

=== Atlanta Falcons ===
He signed with the Atlanta Falcons on November 8, 2006, as a backup to replace injured defensive back Kevin Mathis.

=== Second stint with Dolphins ===
On October 24, 2007, the Dolphins resigned Schulters after suffering several injuries in their secondary.

=== New Orleans Saints ===
On August 18, 2008, Schulters signed with the New Orleans Saints. He was released by the team on August 29.

=== NFL statistics ===
Year	Team	GP	Tackles				Fumbles		Interceptions					
Year	Team	GP	Comb	Solo	Ast	Sack	FF	FR	Int	Yds	Avg	Lng	TD	PD
1998	SF	15	16	12	4	0.0	0	0	0	0	0.0	0	0	1
1999	SF	13	61	52	9	0.0	0	0	6	127	21.2	64	1	9
2000	SF	12	88	58	30	0.5	3	1	0	0	0.0	0	0	3
2001	SF	16	61	52	9	1.0	0	1	3	0	0.0	0	0	10
2002	TEN	16	86	73	13	2.0	0	1	6	56	9.3	28	0	10
2003	TEN	16	85	65	20	1.0	0	0	0	0	0.0	0	0	8
2004	TEN	3	14	12	2	1.0	0	0	0	0	0.0	0	0	1
2005	MIA	16	77	57	20	2.0	1	0	4	78	19.5	37	0	6
2006	ATL	7	9	8	1	0.0	0	0	0	0	0.0	0	0	0
2007	MIA	7	37	27	10	0.0	0	0	0	0	0.0	0	0	2
Career		121	534	416	118	7.5	4	3	19	261	13.7	64	1	50

== Coaching career ==
Schulters became the defensive backs coach at Bryant University in 2011. He joined the Bill Walsh Diversity Coaching Fellowship and landed a job with the Seattle Seahawks.

=== Atlanta Falcons ===
Schulters joined the Atlanta Falcons as a special teams intern in 2015 and eventually became a defensive assistant.

=== Los Angeles Rams ===
Schulters followed Raheem Morris, the Falcons' former interim head coach and Schulters' former teammate at Hofstra, to the Los Angeles Rams as a coaching fellow in 2021. The Rams won the Super Bowl in his first season on their staff. He was promoted to a role as a defensive assistant in 2022. He was fired on January 18, 2023.

=== Atlanta Falcons ===
On February 3, 2024, Schulters returned to the Atlanta Falcons to serve as a defensive assistant under coach Raheem Morris.

== Personal life ==
Schulters' son, K-Shawn, played defensive back at Villanova and Monmouth.
