= Winfred Tubbs =

American football player (born 1970)

No. 54, 55
- Position: Linebacker

Personal information
- Born: September 24, 1970 (age 56); Fairfield, Texas, U.S.
- Listed height: 6 ft 4 in (1.93 m)
- Listed weight: 250 lb (113 kg)

Career information
- High school: Fairfield (TX)
- College: Texas
- NFL draft: 1994: 3rd round, 79th overall pick

Career history
- New Orleans Saints (1994–1997); San Francisco 49ers (1998–2000)

Awards and highlights
- Second-team All-Pro (1997); Pro Bowl (1998); First-team All-SWC (1993); Second-team All-SWC (1992)

Career NFL statistics
- Tackles: 641
- Sacks: 10.5
- Passes defended: 8
- Interceptions: 8
- Forced fumbles: 6
- Fumble recoveries: 7
- Stats at Pro Football Reference

Winfred O'Neal Tubbs (born September 24, 1970) is an American former professional football player. A 6'4", 254 lb (115 kg). linebacker from the University of Texas, Tubbs was selected by the New Orleans Saints in the third round of the 1994 NFL draft. He played seven National Football League (NFL) seasons from 1994 to 2000 for the Saints and San Francisco 49ers. He was selected to the Pro Bowl in 1998, and was named All-NFL (second team) in 1997.

Winfred Tubbs is perhaps best known for his appearance in the arcade football game NFL Blitz.

Tubbs, now an entrepreneur, writes a blog on finance and investing for MSN Money's "The Invested Life."

== NFL career statistics ==
Legend
**Bold**	Career high

=== Regular season ===
Year	Team	Games		Tackles				Interceptions				Fumbles			
Year	Team	GP	GS	Comb	Solo	Ast	Sck	Int	Yds	TD	Lng	FF	FR	Yds	TD
1994	NOR	13	7	54	41	13	1.0	1	0	0	0	0	0	0	0
1995	NOR	7	6	59	44	15	1.0	1	6	0	6	1	1	0	0
1996	NOR	16	13	112	84	28	1.0	1	11	0	11	1	1	0	0
1997	NOR	16	16	**160**	**116**	**44**	**2.5**	**2**	**21**	0	**15**	**2**	**2**	0	0
1998	SFO	16	15	86	60	26	1.0	1	7	0	7	**2**	1	0	0
1999	SFO	16	15	88	74	14	2.0	1	8	0	8	0	1	0	0
2000	SFO	14	14	82	56	26	2.0	1	11	0	11	0	1	0	0
		98	86	641	475	166	10.5	8	64	0	15	6	7	0	0

=== Playoffs ===
Year	Team	Games		Tackles				Interceptions				Fumbles			
Year	Team	GP	GS	Comb	Solo	Ast	Sck	Int	Yds	TD	Lng	FF	FR	Yds	TD
1998	SFO	1	1	9	6	3	0.0	0	0	0	0	0	0	0	0
		1	1	9	6	3	0.0	0	0	0	0	0	0	0	0
