= Gregory Clark =

Gregory Clark is the name of:

== Academics and writers ==
- Greg Clark (journalist) (1892–1977), Canadian author and journalist
- Greg Clark (urbanist) (born 1962), expert on cities and regions
- Gregory Clark (author) (born 1936), Australian diplomat, author and Japan scholar
- Gregory Clark (economist) (born 1957), professor of economics and economic history at the University of Southern Denmark
- Gregory Clark (rhetorician) (born 1950), American rhetorician and professor
- Gregory A. Clark (born 1954), associate professor of biomedical engineering at the University of Utah
- Gregory John Clark (born 1943), Australian physicist and business executive

== Politicians ==
- Gregory S. Clark (1947–2012), Republican politician in Vermont
- Greg Clark (born 1967), British MP and Former Cabinet Minister
- Greg Clark (Canadian politician) (born 1971), Canadian politician in Alberta

== Sportsmen ==
- Greg Clark (tight end) (1972–2021), former tight end for the San Francisco 49ers
- Greg Clark (linebacker) (born 1965), former linebacker for the Chicago Bears, Miami Dolphins and others
- Greg Clark (Australian footballer) (born 1997), Australian rules footballer for the West Coast Eagles and Subiaco

== See also ==
- Greg Clarke (born 1957), chairman of The Football Association
