= Chris Ruhman =

American football player (born 1974)

No. 71, 68
- Position: Offensive tackle

Personal information
- Born: December 19, 1974 (age 51); Houston, Texas, U.S.
- Listed height: 6 ft 5 in (1.96 m)
- Listed weight: 321 lb (146 kg)

Career information
- High school: Nimitz (Houston)
- College: Texas A&M
- NFL draft: 1998: 3rd round, 89th overall pick

Career history
- San Francisco 49ers (1998); Cleveland Browns (1999–2000); Denver Broncos (2001)*
- * Offseason or practice squad member only

Career NFL statistics
- Games played: 11
- Games started: 2
- Fumble recoveries: 1
- Stats at Pro Football Reference

Christopher Aamon Ruhman (born December 19, 1974) is an American former professional football player who was an offensive tackle in the National Football League (NFL). He was selected by the San Francisco 49ers in the third round of the 1998 NFL draft and played for the Cleveland Browns in 1999 and 2000. He played college football for the Texas A&M Aggies.

Currently, Christopher A. Ruhman is the Vice President and General Counsel at Southern Title, LLC and earned his Juris Doctor from Valparaiso University College of Law.
