= Pat Morris (American football) =

American football player and coach (born 1954)

Patrick Morris
Profile
- Position: Offensive guard

Personal information
- Born: April 7, 1954 (age 72)
- Listed height: 6 ft 1 in (1.85 m)
- Listed weight: 226 lb (103 kg)

Career information
- High school: Bishop Alemany High School (Sylmar, California)

Career history
- USC (1976-1977) Graduate assistant; Northern Arizona (1978) Offensive line coach; Minnesota (1979-1982) Offensive line coach; USC (1983-1986) Offensive line coach; Michigan State (1987–1994) Offensive line coach; Stanford (1995-1996) Offensive tackles and tight ends coach; San Francisco 49ers (1997–1998) Tight ends and assistant offensive line coach; San Francisco 49ers (1999–2003) Offensive line coach; Detroit Lions (2004–2005) Offensive line coach; Minnesota Vikings (2006–2010) Offensive line coach; Tampa Bay Buccaneers (2011) Offensive line coach; Buffalo Bills (2013–2014) Offensive line coach; San Diego Fleet (2019) Offensive line coach

Patrick Morris (born April 7, 1954, in Cleveland, Ohio) is a former offensive line coach in the National Football League.

== College career ==
Morris was a reserve offensive guard for USC from 1972 to 1975, lettering in 1975.

== Coaching ==
Morris began his coaching career immediately after his playing career ended, staying with USC as a graduate assistant for the 1976 and 1977 seasons, working with the offensive line. He later returned to USC as their offensive line coach in 1983, after spending the 1978 season coaching offensive line for Northern Arizona and the 1979–1982 seasons coaching offensive line for Minnesota.

After four seasons with USC, Morris was hired as the offensive line coach for Michigan State, a position he held from 1987 to 1994. After coaching offensive tackles and tight ends at Stanford from 1995 to 1996, Morris entered the NFL coaching ranks in 1997 as the tight ends and assistant offensive line coach for the San Francisco 49ers. He was promoted to offensive line coach entering the 1999 season, taking over for Bobb McKittrick who was forced to retire due to cancer. Morris later followed his former 49ers head coach Steve Mariucci to Detroit, serving as the offensive line coach for the Lions from 2004 to 2005. He was fired along with Mariucci on November 29, 2005, after a disappointing season marred with poor offensive production.

Morris then spent the 2006–2010 seasons as the offensive line coach for the Minnesota Vikings, coaching Pro Bowl offensive linemen such as Matt Birk, Bryant McKinnie, and Steve Hutchinson. After a regime change in Minnesota, he left to coach the offensive line for the Tampa Bay Buccaneers for the 2011 season. He was not retained when head coach Raheem Morris and his staff were fired after the season.

Morris was named the offensive line coach for the Buffalo Bills on January 19, 2013. He was not retained by new Bills head coach Rex Ryan entering the 2015 season. After several seasons away from coaching, Morris was hired as the offensive line coach in 2019 for the San Diego Fleet of the short-lived Alliance of American Football by head coach Mike Martz.
