= Chad Fann =

American football player (born 1970)

No. 80, 86
- Position: Tight end

Personal information
- Born: June 7, 1970 (age 56); Jacksonville, Florida, U.S.
- Listed height: 6 ft 3 in (1.91 m)
- Listed weight: 252 lb (114 kg)

Career information
- High school: Jean Ribault (Jacksonville)
- College: Ole Miss; Florida A&M
- NFL draft: 1993: undrafted

Career history
- Phoenix/Arizona Cardinals (1993–1995); San Francisco 49ers (1997–1999); Minnesota Vikings (2000)*
- * Offseason or practice squad member only

Career NFL statistics
- Receptions: 24
- Receiving Yards: 223
- Stats at Pro Football Reference

Chad Fitzgerald Fann (born June 7, 1970) is an American former professional football player who was a tight end in the National Football League (NFL) for the Phoenix/Arizona Cardinals and San Francisco 49ers from 1993 to 1999. He played college football for the Ole Miss Rebels and Florida A&M Rattlers. He played 72 career games in the NFL while making 15 starts.

Fann signed with the Minnesota Vikings on March 31, 2000, but retired on July 26, 2000.
