= Zack Bronson =

American football player and coach (born 1974)

No. 31
- Position: Safety

Personal information
- Born: January 28, 1974 (age 52); Jasper, Texas, U.S.
- Listed height: 6 ft 1 in (1.85 m)
- Listed weight: 204 lb (93 kg)

Career information
- College: McNeese State

Career history

Playing
- San Francisco 49ers (1997–2003); St. Louis Rams (2004)

Coaching
- McNeese State (Graduate Assistant) (2007-2009); Westside High School (Head Coach) (2009-2012); Kelly Catholic High School (Head Coach) (2013-2015); McNeese State (Cornerbacks) (2016-present)

Career statistics
- Total tackles: 236
- Forced fumbles: 2
- Fumble recoveries: 2
- Pass deflections: 24
- Interceptions: 19
- Defensive touchdowns: 2
- Stats at Pro Football Reference

Robert Zach Bronson (born January 28, 1974) is a cornerbacks coach at McNeese State and a former professional American football safety in the National Football League. He played professionally for the San Francisco 49ers his entire NFL career from 1997 to 2003.

== Early life ==
Bronson was born in Jasper, Texas, and graduated from Jasper High School (Jasper, Texas). He attended McNeese State University.

== Professional career ==
Bronson went undrafted in the 1997 NFL draft, and subsequently signed with the San Francisco 49ers. During his rookie year, Bronson recorded 24 tackles and an interception. The following year, Bronson, splitting playing time with Tim McDonald at safety, led the team in interceptions with four. In 2001, Bronson set the record for the longest interception return in franchise history against the Chicago Bears, returning the pick 97 yards for a touchdown.

He played professionally for eight seasons, but suffered a neck injury that hampered his performance and eventually led to his retirement. Bronson ended his career with 191 tackles, 19 interceptions (two returned for touchdowns) and 32 passes defended.

== Coaching career ==
Bronson started coaching in 2007 as a graduate assistant for his alma mater, McNeese State. He then went on to be a head coach at two high schools, one in Houston and one in Beaumont, both in Texas. He went back to McNeese in 2016 and has served as an assistant coach and cornerbacks coach since then.
