= Richard Smith (American football coach) =

American football coach (born 1955)

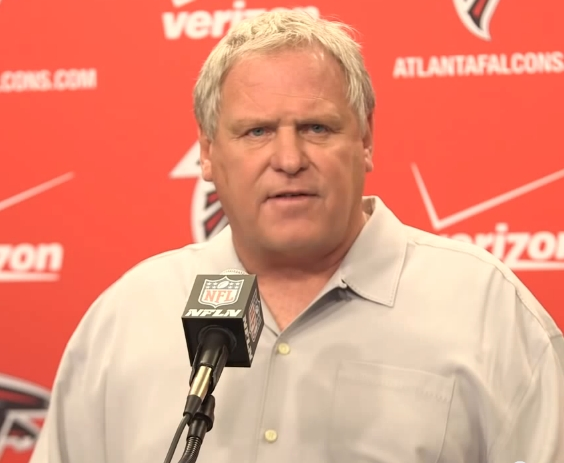
- Smith with the Atlanta Falcons in 2015

Chicago Bears
- Title: Linebackers coach

Personal information
- Born: October 17, 1955 (age 71); Los Angeles, California, U.S.

Career information
- College: Rio Hondo (1975–1976); Fresno State (1977)

Career history
- Rio Hondo (1979–1980) Offensive line coach; Cal State Fullerton (1981–1983) Defensive line coach; California (1984–1986) Linebackers coach & special teams coach; Arizona (1987) Linebackers coach & special teams coach; Houston Oilers (1988–1992) Special teams coach & tight ends, linebackers & offensive line ass't; Denver Broncos (1993–1994) Special teams coach & ass't linebackers coach; Denver Broncos (1995–1996) Special teams coach; San Francisco 49ers (1997–2002) Linebackers coach; Detroit Lions (2003–2004) Linebackers coach; Miami Dolphins (2005) Defensive coordinator; Houston Texans (2006–2008) Defensive coordinator; Carolina Panthers (2009–2010) Linebackers coach; Denver Broncos (2011–2014) Linebackers coach; Atlanta Falcons (2015–2016) Defensive coordinator; Los Angeles Chargers (2017–2020) Linebackers coach; Las Vegas Raiders (2021) Linebackers coach; Indianapolis Colts (2022–2024) Linebackers coach; Chicago Bears (2025–present) Linebackers coach
- Coaching profile at Pro Football Reference

Richard Smith (born October 17, 1955) is an American football coach who is the linebackers coach for the Chicago Bears of the National Football League (NFL). He has been defensive coordinator for the Atlanta Falcons, as well as the Houston Texans and Miami Dolphins, and a linebacker coach for the Los Angeles Chargers, Las Vegas Raiders, and Indianapolis Colts.

== Coaching career ==
=== Detroit Lions ===
Smith was hired by the Detroit Lions in 2003 as an assistant head coach and linebackers coach.

=== Miami Dolphins ===
Smith was hired by the Miami Dolphins in 2005 as one of the defensive coordinators.

=== Houston Texans ===
Smith was hired by the Houston Texans in 2006 as a defensive coordinator.

=== Carolina Panthers ===
Smith was hired by the Carolina Panthers in February 2009 as a linebackers coach.

=== Denver Broncos ===
Smith was hired by the Denver Broncos on January 25, 2011.

=== Atlanta Falcons ===
When the Atlanta Falcons hired Smith on January 26, 2015, the Falcons were the worst-ranked defense in passing yards in 2014 prior to his arrival. He was fired by the Falcons after their defensive collapse in Super Bowl LI, with defensive leadership being taken over by head coach Dan Quinn midway through the season.

=== Los Angeles Chargers ===
Smith was hired by the Los Angeles Chargers on February 13, 2017, as a linebackers coach.

=== Las Vegas Raiders ===
Smith was hired by the Las Vegas Raiders on January 12, 2021, as a linebackers coach.

=== Indianapolis Colts ===
Smith was hired by the Indianapolis Colts in February of 2022 as a linebackers coach.

=== Chicago Bears ===
On February 6, 2025, the Chicago Bears hired Smith as their linebackers coach.
