= Greg Knapp =

American football coach (1963–2021)

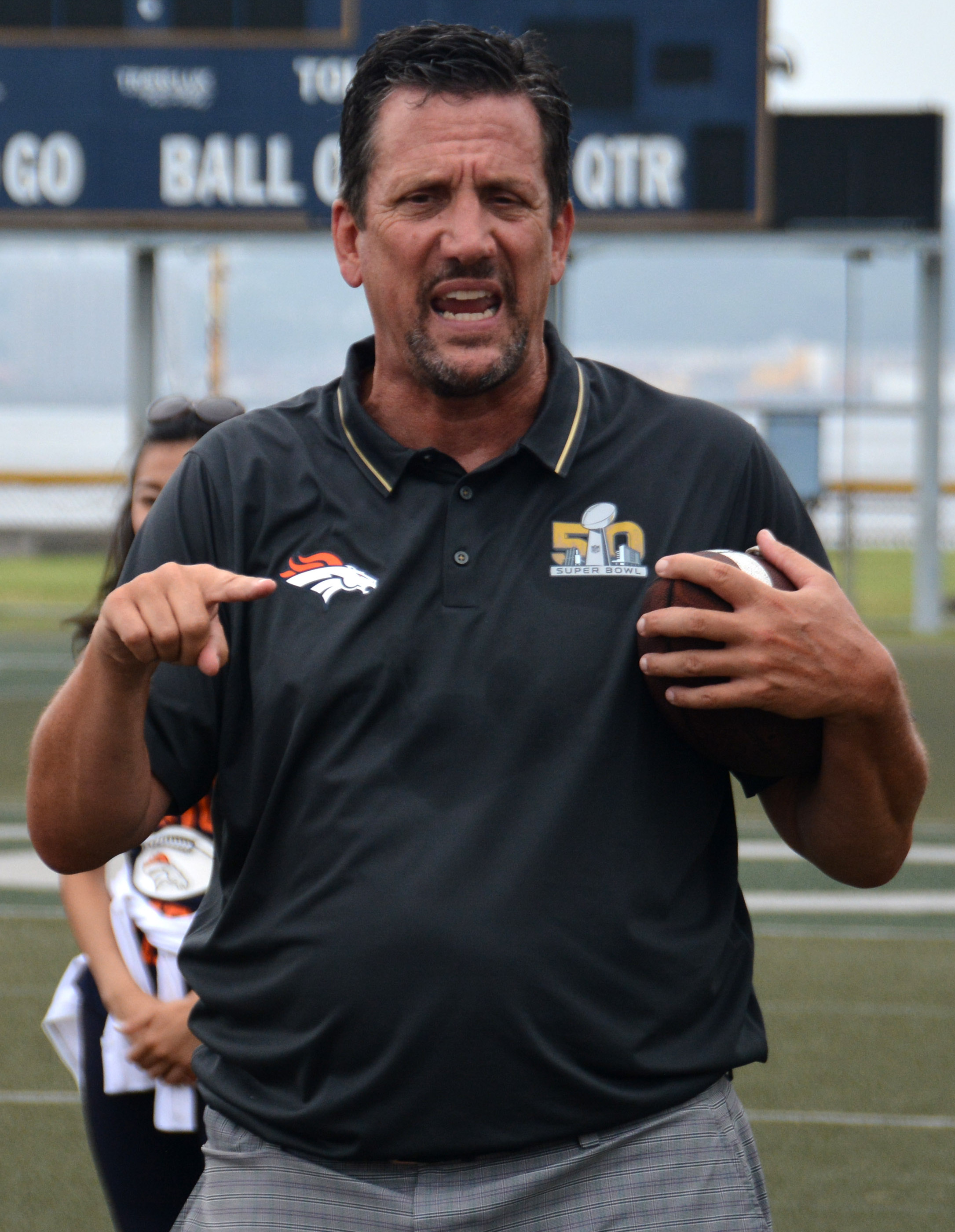
- Knapp at United States Fleet Activities Yokosuka in 2016

Profile
- Position: Quarterback

Personal information
- Born: March 5, 1963; Long Beach, California, U.S.
- Died: July 22, 2021 (aged 58); Walnut Creek, California, U.S.

Career information
- High school: Huntington Beach (CA)
- College: Sacramento State
- NFL draft: 1986: undrafted

Career history

Playing
- Kansas City Chiefs (1986)*; Los Angeles Raiders (1987–1990)*; San Francisco 49ers (1992–1994)*
- * Offseason or practice squad member only

Coaching
- Sacramento State (1986–1988) Running backs coach; Sacramento State (1989–1990) Wide receivers coach; Sacramento State (1991–1994) Assistant head coach & offensive coordinator; San Francisco 49ers (1995–1997) Offensive quality control coach; San Francisco 49ers (1998–2000) Quarterbacks coach; San Francisco 49ers (2001–2003) Offensive coordinator; Atlanta Falcons (2004–2006) Offensive coordinator; Oakland Raiders (2007–2008) Offensive coordinator; Seattle Seahawks (2009) Offensive coordinator; Houston Texans (2010–2011) Quarterbacks coach; Oakland Raiders (2012) Offensive coordinator; Denver Broncos (2013–2016) Quarterbacks coach; Atlanta Falcons (2018–2020) Quarterbacks coach; New York Jets (2021) Pass game specialist

Awards and highlights
- Super Bowl champion (50)
- Coaching profile at Pro Football Reference

Gregory Fishbeck Knapp (March 5, 1963 – July 22, 2021) was an American professional football coach in the National Football League (NFL). He served as an assistant coach for 25 seasons with the New York Jets, Atlanta Falcons, Denver Broncos, Oakland Raiders, Houston Texans, Seattle Seahawks, and San Francisco 49ers. Knapp played college football and later coached at California State University, Sacramento.

== Playing career ==
As a quarterback at Sacramento State University, Knapp enjoyed a distinguished career where he ranked among the Hornets' career leaders with more than 3,800 passing yards and 32 touchdown passes. He went to training camps with the Kansas City Chiefs in 1986, Los Angeles Raiders from 1987 to 1990, and the San Francisco 49ers in 1992 to 1994. Prior to joining the 49ers as a coach, Knapp spent nine years on the coaching staff of Sacramento State, as running backs coach from 1986 to 1989, receivers coach from 1989 to 1990, and offensive coordinator/assistant head coach from 1991 to 1994. Knapp's coaching career at Sacramento State included the 1988 season where Sacramento State reached the semifinals of the NCAA Division II Football Championship.

== Coaching career ==
=== San Francisco 49ers ===
Knapp spent nine years in various positions with the San Francisco 49ers: offensive quality control from 1995 to 1997, quarterbacks coach from 1998 to 2000, and offensive coordinator from 2001 to 2003, featuring the West coast offense.

=== Atlanta Falcons (first stint) ===
Knapp was named offensive coordinator for the Atlanta Falcons from 2004 to 2006, helping to form Michael Vick at quarterback as a potent two-way offensive threat. The 2004 Atlanta Falcons finished first in the NFC South with an 11–5 record.

=== Oakland Raiders (first stint) ===
Knapp then went to the Oakland Raiders as offensive coordinator in 2007 and 2008.

=== Seattle Seahawks ===
In 2009, Knapp was hired by the Seattle Seahawks as offensive coordinator.

=== Houston Texans ===
Knapp was the quarterbacks coach of the Houston Texans from 2010 to 2011, helping mold Matt Schaub into a premier quarterback. The 2011 Texans finished the season 10–6 and first place in the AFC South.

=== Oakland Raiders (second stint) ===
Before the start of the 2012 NFL season, he was named by new head coach Dennis Allen, whom he met as a fellow coach in Atlanta, as offensive coordinator of the Raiders a second time around. To strengthen the offensive line, the Raiders' general manager, Reggie McKenzie, picked the Texans' right guard, Mike Brisiel, as a free agent. After a season marked by a switch to a zone-blocking scheme at Knapp's urging, and the resulting ineffectiveness of the Raiders' key offensive threat, running back Darren McFadden, Knapp was relieved of his duties as the Raiders offensive coordinator on December 31, 2012.

=== Denver Broncos ===
Knapp was hired as the quarterbacks coach for the Denver Broncos on January 18, 2013. In Knapp's first season as the Broncos' quarterback coach, Denver's offense set the record for both the most points scored in a season and most passing yards in a season, at 606 and 5,572, respectively, both the all-time NFL records, becoming the first team ever to eclipse 600 points in a season. Quarterback Peyton Manning also won his fifth MVP award, throwing 55 touchdown passes and 5,477 passing yards, both NFL single-season records. His 450 completions were at the time tied for second most all time. Manning passed for at least 400 yards in a record-tying three games, matching Dan Marino's 1984 season. They had more 50-point games in a season than any other team in NFL history, with three. Four Broncos receivers recorded at least ten touchdowns—an NFL record—and Manning set a season record with nine games with four or more touchdown passes.

On February 7, 2016, Knapp was part of the Broncos coaching staff that won Super Bowl 50. In the game, the Broncos defeated the Carolina Panthers by a score of 24–10.

After Vance Joseph was hired as head coach for the Broncos, he and Knapp parted ways.

=== Atlanta Falcons (second stint) ===
On January 22, 2018, Knapp returned to the Atlanta Falcons as their quarterbacks coach.

=== New York Jets ===
On January 18, 2021, Knapp was hired by the New York Jets as their quarterbacks coach under head coach Robert Saleh.

== Personal life and death ==
On July 17, 2021, Knapp was struck by a motorist while riding his bicycle in San Ramon, California, near his home. He died from his injuries five days later in a hospital in Walnut Creek, California, at the age of 58.

Knapp was survived by his daughter, Jordan, wife, Charlotte, and three stepdaughters, Bailey, Natalie and Camille. At the time of his death, he lived in Danville, California.

To honor Knapp’s memory and raise awareness of the dangers of distracted driving, the Coach Knapp Memorial Fund was created.
