= Junior Bryant =

American football player (born 1971)

No. 90
- Positions: Defensive tackle, defensive end

Personal information
- Born: January 16, 1971 (age 55); Omaha, Nebraska, U.S.
- Listed height: 6 ft 4 in (1.93 m)
- Listed weight: 278 lb (126 kg)

Career information
- High school: Creighton Prep
- College: Notre Dame
- NFL draft: 1993: undrafted

Career history
- San Francisco 49ers (1993–2000), (2002)

Awards and highlights
- Super Bowl champion (XXIX)

Career NFL statistics
- Tackles: 163
- Sacks: 13.5
- Forced fumbles: 4
- Fumble recoveries: 2
- Passes defended: 6
- Stats at Pro Football Reference

Edward Ethan "Junior" Bryant Jr. (born January 16, 1971, in Omaha, Nebraska) is an American former professional football player who was a defensive lineman for six seasons with the San Francisco 49ers of the National Football League (NFL). He played college football for the Notre Dame Fighting Irish and was signed by the 49ers as an undrafted free agent. He appeared in 83 total regular season games, all with San Francisco, during his nine-year career. He registered 13.5 sacks in the NFL. His career was cut short after sustaining a neck injury while playing in a game at St. Louis in 2000.

Junior Bryant played his high school football at Creighton Preparatory School. There, his teams won three state titles.
