= Darnell Walker =

American football player (born 1970)

No. 45, 38, 41
- Position: Cornerback

Personal information
- Born: January 17, 1970 (age 56); St. Louis, Missouri, U.S.
- Listed height: 5 ft 8 in (1.73 m)
- Listed weight: 168 lb (76 kg)

Career information
- High school: Sumner (St. Louis)
- College: Oklahoma
- NFL draft: 1993: 7th round, 178th overall pick

Career history
- Atlanta Falcons (1993–1996); San Francisco 49ers (1997–1999); Minnesota Vikings (2000)*; Detroit Lions (2000)
- * Offseason or practice squad member only

Career NFL statistics
- Tackles: 346
- Interceptions: 16
- Touchdowns: 2
- Stats at Pro Football Reference

Darnell Walker (born January 17, 1970) is an American former professional football player who was a cornerback in the National Football League (NFL). He played college football for the Oklahoma Sooners and was selected 178th overall by the Atlanta Falcons in the seventh round of the 1993 NFL draft. He played for the Falcons, San Francisco 49ers, and Detroit Lions from 1993 to 2000.
