= Bobb McKittrick =

American football player and coach (1935–2000)

Profile
- Position: Offensive line coach

Personal information
- Born: December 29, 1935 (age 90); Baker City, Oregon, U.S.
- Died: March 15, 2000 (aged 64)

Career information
- College: Oregon State

Career history
- Oregon State (1961–1964) Linebackers/tight ends coach; UCLA (1965–1970) Defensive coordinator; Los Angeles Rams (1971–1972) Offensive line coach; San Diego Chargers (1974–1978) Offensive line coach; San Francisco 49ers (1979–1999) Offensive line coach

Awards and highlights
- 5× Super Bowl champion (XVI, XIX, XXIII, XXIV, XXIX)

Bobb McKittrick (December 29, 1935 – March 15, 2000) was an American football offensive line coach in the National Football League (NFL) who coached in five Super Bowls.

== Playing career ==
Born in Baker City, Oregon (then known as Baker), McKittrick attended Oregon State University, and was a member of the Acacia Fraternity. He played college football for the Oregon State Beavers, helping them to a Pacific Coast Conference championship in 1956, playing in the 1957 Rose Bowl. Following graduation from Oregon State, he served as an officer in the United States Marines Corps for three years.

== Coaching career ==
From 1961 to 1964, McKittrick was a linebacker and tight end coach at Oregon State, helping the team reach the 1962 Liberty Bowl and the 1965 Rose Bowl. He followed Beaver head coach Tommy Prothro in 1965 to UCLA, where he coached in his second straight Rose Bowl with the Bruins in 1966. From 1971 to 1972, he was the offensive line coach of the NFL's Los Angeles Rams. From 1974 to 1978, he was an offensive line coach with the San Diego Chargers. In 1976, he coached the offensive line under Bill Walsh, who was the Chargers' offensive coordinator for that single season.

From 1979 to 1999, he coached the San Francisco 49ers offensive line. During his 21 years with the 49ers, the team won five Super Bowls (Super Bowl XVI, Super Bowl XIX, Super Bowl XXIII, Super Bowl XXIV, and Super Bowl XXIX) and 13 NFC West championships. McKittrick is one of only four coaches, the others being George Seifert, Ray Rhodes and Bill McPherson, to be a part of all five of the 49ers' Super Bowl-winning teams.

McKittrick's success derived from his ability to get the most effect out of unheralded talent. The 49ers' offensive line that won the various Super Bowls consisted of only one player drafted in the first round.

== Death and legacy ==
In January 1999, McKittrick was diagnosed with cholangiocarcinoma (cancer of the bile duct) and died 14 months later. Later that same year, he was named to the Oregon Sports Hall of Fame for his excellence in coaching.

=== Bobb McKittrick Award ===
This award is given annually to the 49ers offensive lineman who best exemplifies the dedication, excellence and commitment of offensive line coach Bobb McKittrick, a five-time Super Bowl champion.

In 1999, the San Francisco 49ers, under the direction of Bill Walsh, established the Bobb McKittrick Award. The award is meant to honor those offensive linemen who have best represented the courage, intensity and sacrifice displayed by the late Coach McKittrick during his 21 years of service with the 49ers.

“Bobb gave distinguished service to the organization since our renaissance in 1979. He was a vital factor in five Super Bowl Championships, the evolution of a dynasty and in the production of some of the finest offensive linemen in football. Offensive linemen don't receive the recognition they so richly deserve. This gives us a venue to honor their sacrifices and achievements”, Walsh said.

A bronze plaque of McKittrick hangs in the 49ers locker room surrounded by photographs of the McKittrick Award winners.
