= Bill McPherson (American football) =

American football coach (1931–2020)

Personal information
- Born: October 24, 1931; Santa Clara, California, U.S.
- Died: March 17, 2020 (aged 88); Santa Clara, California, U.S.

Career information
- High school: Bellarmine College Preparatory
- College: Santa Clara

Career history

Coaching
- Bellarmine College Preparatory (1956–1962) Assistant coach; Santa Clara (1963–1974) Defensive coordinator & defensive line coach; UCLA (1975–1977) Linebackers coach; Philadelphia Eagles (1978) Linebackers coach; San Francisco 49ers (1979–1998); Linebackers coach (1979); Defensive line coach (1980–1986); Linebackers coach (1987–1988); Defensive coordinator (1989–1993); Assistant head coach (1994–1998)

Operations
- San Francisco 49ers (1999–2005); Director of player personnel (1999–2002); Player personnel assistant (2003–2005)

Awards and highlights
- 5× Super Bowl champion (XXIV, XXIX, XVI, XIX, XXIII)

Bill McPherson (October 24, 1931 – March 17, 2020) was an American professional football coach in the National Football League (NFL). He was the San Francisco 49ers defensive coordinator from 1989 to 1993. He was a coach or front office executive in the 49ers organization from 1979 to 2005 and won five Super Bowls.

== Coaching career ==
McPherson was most known for his ability to coach the defensive line, serving as coach of that position for Santa Clara University (1963–1974), UCLA (1975–1977), Philadelphia Eagles (1978), and San Francisco 49ers (1979–1991, 1994–1998). While with Santa Clara, he also served as linebackers coach and associate head coach.

== Personal life ==
His son, Pat, is the tight ends coach for the Carolina Panthers. McPherson died on March 17, 2020, at the age of 88.

He was a member of the U.S. Army in the Korean War.
