= Greg Clark (tight end) =

American football player (1972–2021)

No. 85
- Position: Tight end

Personal information
- Born: April 7, 1972; Centerville, Utah, U.S.
- Died: July 7, 2021 (aged 49); Danville, California, U.S.
- Listed height: 6 ft 4 in (1.93 m)
- Listed weight: 251 lb (114 kg)

Career information
- High school: Viewmont (Bountiful, Utah)
- College: Ricks College (1990, 1994) and; Stanford (1995-1997)
- NFL draft: 1997: 3rd round, 77th overall pick

Career history
- San Francisco 49ers (1997–2000)

Career NFL statistics
- Receptions: 92
- Receiving yards: 909
- Receiving touchdowns: 4
- Stats at Pro Football Reference

Gregory Jay Clark (April 7, 1972 – July 7, 2021) was an American professional football player who was a tight end for the San Francisco 49ers in the National Football League (NFL). He was selected by the 49ers in the third round of the 1997 NFL draft with the 77th overall pick.

== Early life ==
Clark was born in Centerville, Utah; He was the eldest of eight siblings (seven boys, one girl).

== College career ==
Clark received both athletic and academic honors while in college.

=== Ricks College (now BYU-Idaho) ===
Clack was a consensus First-team All-American from Ricks College. The 1994 Vikings had 11 players being named to the first team, and five on the second team, in the Western Conference Football League honors.

=== Stanford University ===
Clark was recruited to Stanford University as a receiving tight end by Bill Walsh. While at Stanford, Clark credited much of his development as a blocker to his coach Pat Morris. Clark became a star at Stanford before the 49ers traded up to select him. Clark was the sixth tight end selected and the 77th overall pick in the 1997 NFL draft.

== Professional football career ==
A 6'5", 255-lb. tight end from Stanford University, Clark played in 5 National Football League seasons and his entire career with the 49ers from 1997 to 2001. He was widely recognized as one of the premier blocking tight ends in the NFL. He finished his professional career with 92 receptions, 909 yards receiving, and 4 touchdowns during the regular season. In addition, he caught two touchdowns in the 1998-99 playoff game against the Green Bay Packers prior to Terrell Owens's last second catch from Steve Young to defeat the Packers. Clark was named to the 1999 USA Today All-Joe Team. Injuries forced him into early retirement, in 2001.

== Post football career ==
Clark worked in investment real estate in the East Bay area and lived in Danville, California, after his playing career.

== Personal life ==
Clark served a two-year mission (1991-1993) in Peoria, Illinois, for the Church of Jesus Christ of Latter-Day Saints. Clark was described as a loving husband to Carie, his wife of 23 years, and a dedicated father of three sons.

== Death ==
Clark died from a self inflicted gunshot on July 7, 2021. He had experienced "chronic traumatic encephalopathy-like" symptoms prior to his suicide, later revealed in March 2022 to be CTE Stage III. He was one of at least 345 NFL players to be diagnosed after death with this disease, which is caused by repeated hits to the head.
