= 2003 San Francisco 49ers season =

American football team season

- Owner: Denise DeBartolo York and John York
- General manager: Terry Donahue
- Head coach: Dennis Erickson
- Home stadium: San Francisco Stadium at Candlestick Point

Results
- Record: 7–9
- Division place: 3rd NFC West
- Playoffs: Did not qualify
- All-Pros: LB Julian Peterson (1st team); FB Fred Beasley (2nd team); SS Tony Parrish (2nd team)
- Pro Bowlers: FB Fred Beasley; WR Terrell Owens; LB Julian Peterson

Uniform
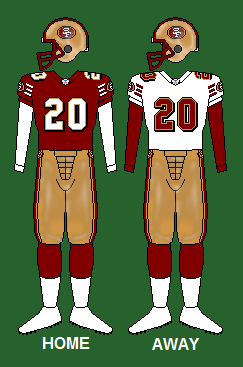

The 2003 San Francisco 49ers season was the franchise's 57th season in the National Football League (NFL).

The team entered their 2003 season attempting to improve upon their 10–6 output from 2002. Dennis Erickson was the new head coach after Steve Mariucci was fired which resulted in a search that lasted four weeks. The 49ers failed to surpass their 2002 record and finished the season 7–9 by losing six close games, and the 49ers missed the playoffs for the first time since 2000.

It was the final season that noted 49ers Terrell Owens, Garrison Hearst, Tai Streets, Derrick Deese, Ron Stone, and Jeff Garcia spent with the team.

== Offseason ==
=== NFL draft ===
2003 San Francisco 49ers draft
Round	Pick	Player	Position	College	Notes
1	26	Kwame Harris	Offensive tackle	Stanford	
2	57	Anthony Adams	Defensive tackle	Penn State	
3	89	Andrew Williams	Defensive end	Miami (FL)	
4	124	Brandon Lloyd *	Wide receiver	Illinois	
5	161	Aaron Walker	Tight end	Florida	
6	197	Arnaz Battle	Wide receiver	Notre Dame	
7	241	Ken Dorsey	Quarterback	Miami (FL)	
Made roster * Made at least one Pro Bowl during career

== Personnel ==
=== Staff ===
2003 San Francisco 49ers staff
Front office: Owner – Denise DeBartolo York; Owner – John York; Owner – The DeBartolo Corporation; President/chief executive officer – Peter L. Harris; general manager – Terry Donahue; Consultant – Bill Walsh; Vice president/director of football operations – John McVay; Asst. director of football operations/salary cap – Dominic Corsell; Assistant director of football administration – Terry Tumey; Personnel consultant – Bill McPherson; Head coaches: Head coach – Dennis Erickson; Associate head coach – Greg McMackin; Assistant head coach – Gregg Smith; Offensive coaches: Offensive coordinator – Greg Knapp; Quarterbacks – Ted Tollner; Running backs – Tim Lappano; Wide receivers – Eric Yarber; Tight ends – Gregg Smith; Offensive line – Patrick Morris; Offensive assistant – Chris Beake; Offensive quality control – Jason Tarver	Defensive coaches: Defensive coordinator – Jim Mora; Defensive line – Dan Quinn; Linebackers – Greg McMackin; Secondary – Brett Maxie; Assistant secondary – Al Simmons; Defensive assistant – Dick Tomey; Defensive quality control – Jamie Christian; Special teams coaches: Special teams coordinator – Larry Mac Duff; Special teams quality control – Jeff Rodgers; Strength and conditioning: Physical development coordinator – Jerry Attaway; Strength development coordinator – Terrell Jones

=== Roster ===
2003 San Francisco 49ers roster
Quarterbacks (QB): 7 Ken Dorsey; 5 Jeff Garcia; 13 Tim Rattay; Running backs (RB): 32 Kevan Barlow; 40 Fred Beasley FB; 20 Garrison Hearst; 41 Jasen Isom FB; 22 Terry Jackson; 25 Jamal Robertson; Wide receivers (WR): 18 James Jordan; 85 Brandon Lloyd; 89 Tai Streets; 84 Cedrick Wilson; Tight ends (TE): 49 Aaron Walker; 88 Jed Weaver	Offensive linemen (OL): 76 Jerome Davis T; 63 Derrick Deese T; 78 Scott Gragg T; 52 Brock Gutierrez C; 77 Kwame Harris T; 66 Eric Heitmann G; 69 Kyle Kosier G/T; 68 Rob Murphy G; 62 Jeremy Newberry C; 65 Ron Stone G; Defensive linemen (DL): 91 Anthony Adams DT; 72 Chidi Ahanotu DE; 96 Andre Carter DE; 95 John Engelberger DE; 67 Travis Kirschke DT; 93 Michael Landry DE; 99 Sean Moran DE; 94 Andrew Williams DE; 97 Bryant Young DT	Linebackers (LB): 57 Cornelius Anthony MLB; 56 Brandon Moore OLB; 98 Julian Peterson OLB; 51 Saleem Rasheed OLB; 50 Derek Smith MLB; 53 Jeff Ulbrich OLB; Defensive backs (DB): 31 Zack Bronson FS; 35 Dwaine Carpenter CB/S; 38 Ronnie Heard FS; 25 Rashad Holman CB; 28 John Keith FS; 33 Tony Parrish SS; 29 Ahmed Plummer CB; 24 Mike Rumph CB; 36 Jason Webster CB; 23 Jimmy Williams CB; Special teams (ST): 86 Brian Jennings LS; 4 Bill Lafleur P; 2 Todd Peterson K	Practice squad: 21 Allan Amundson RB; 19 Arland Bruce WR (IR); 74 Alonzo Cunningham G; 27 Joselio Hanson CB; 15 Adam Herzing WR; 17 Kahlil Hill WR; Reserve: 83 Arnaz Battle WR (IR); 82 Eric Johnson TE (IR); 67 Dwayne Ledford C (IR); 81 Terrell Owens WR (IR); 55 Jamie Winborn LB (IR); Rookies in italics 53 active, 6 reserve, 5 practice squad

== Preseason ==
Week	Date	Opponent	Result	Record	Venue
1	August 9	at Kansas City Chiefs	W 24–6	1–0	Arrowhead Stadium
2	August 14	Oakland Raiders	W 14–10	2–0	3Com Park
3	August 23	New Orleans Saints	W 27–12	3–0	3Com Park
4	August 29	at San Diego Chargers	L 3–24	3–1	Qualcomm Stadium

== Regular season ==
=== Schedule ===
Week	Date	Opponent	Result	Record	Venue	Attendance
1	September 7	Chicago Bears	**W** 49–7	1–0	San Francisco Stadium at Candlestick Point	67,554
2	September 14	at **St. Louis Rams**	**L** 24–27 (OT)	1–1	Edward Jones Dome	65,990
3	September 21	Cleveland Browns	**L** 12–13	1–2	San Francisco Stadium at Candlestick Point	67,412
4	September 28	at Minnesota Vikings	**L** 7–35	1–3	Hubert H. Humphrey Metrodome	64,111
5	October 5	Detroit Lions	**W** 24–17	2–3	San Francisco Stadium at Candlestick Point	67,365
6	October 12	at **Seattle Seahawks**	**L** 19–20	2–4	Seahawks Stadium	66,437
7	October 19	Tampa Bay Buccaneers	**W** 24–7	3–4	San Francisco Stadium at Candlestick Point	67,809
8	October 26	at **Arizona Cardinals**	**L** 13–16 (OT)	3–5	Sun Devil Stadium	40,824
9	November 2	**St. Louis Rams**	**W** 30–10	4–5	San Francisco Stadium at Candlestick Point	67,812
10	Bye					
11	November 17	Pittsburgh Steelers	**W** 30–14	5–5	San Francisco Stadium at Candlestick Point	67,877
12	November 23	at Green Bay Packers	**L** 10–20	5–6	Lambeau Field	70,250
13	November 30	at Baltimore Ravens	**L** 6–44	5–7	M&T Bank Stadium	69,549
14	December 7	**Arizona Cardinals**	**W** 50–14	6–7	San Francisco Stadium at Candlestick Point	66,975
15	December 14	at Cincinnati Bengals	**L** 38–41	6–8	Paul Brown Stadium	64,666
16	December 21	at Philadelphia Eagles	**W** 31–28 (OT)	7–8	Lincoln Financial Field	67,866
17	December 27	**Seattle Seahawks**	**L** 17–24	7–9	San Francisco Stadium at Candlestick Point	67,840
Note: Intra-division opponents are in **bold** text.

=== Game summaries ===
==== Week 1: vs. Chicago Bears ====
Week 1: Chicago Bears at San Francisco 49ers

Quarter	1	2	3	4	Total
Bears	0	7	0	0	**7**
**49ers**	10	23	6	10	**49**

at San Francisco Stadium at Candlestick Point

- Date: Sunday, September 7, 2003
- Game weather: 66 °F or 18.9 °C (Partly cloudy)
- TV announcers (Fox): Sam Rosen & Bill Maas

Game information
**1st Quarter**
- SF – Jeff Chandler 22-yard field goal **SF 3–0**
- SF – Garrison Hearst 12-yard pass from Jeff Garcia (Jeff Chandler kick) **SF 10–0**

**2nd Quarter**

- CHI – Desmond Clark 3-yard pass from Kordell Stewart (Paul Edinger kick) **SF 10–7**
- SF – Jeff Garcia 3-yard rush (Jeff Chandler kick) **SF 17–7**
- SF – Tai Streets 16-yard pass from Jeff Garcia (kick failed) **SF 23–7**
- SF – Ahmed Plummer 68-yard interception return (Jeff Chandler kick) **SF 30–7**
- SF – Jeff Chandler 29-yard field goal **SF 33–7**

**3rd Quarter**

- SF – Jeff Chandler 28-yard field goal **SF 36–7**
- SF – Jeff Chandler 24-yard field goal **SF 39–7**

**4th Quarter**

- SF – Jeff Chandler 26-yard field goal **SF 42–7**
- SF – Garrison Hearst 1-yard rush (Jeff Chandler kick) **49–7**

The 49ers started the season off strongly, defeating the Bears 49–7. The game was close in the second quarter, with the 49ers leading 10–7, however, the Bears' defense gave way to the 49ers' offense who scored 39 unanswered points. The Bears were also plagued with turnovers; the team lost two fumbles and quarterback Kordell Stewart tossed three interceptions. The 49ers’ offensive line performed exceptionally well, as quarterback Jeff Garcia was never sacked during the course of the game.

==== Week 2: at St. Louis Rams ====
Week 2: San Francisco 49ers at St. Louis Rams

Quarter	1	2	3	4	OT	Total
49ers	7	3	7	7	0	**24**
**Rams**	7	0	7	10	3	**27**

at Edward Jones Dome, St. Louis, Missouri

- Date: Sunday, September 14, 2003
- Game weather: Played indoors (domed stadium)
- TV announcers (Fox): Joe Buck, Troy Aikman, Cris Collinsworth & Pam Oliver

Game information
**1st Quarter**
- SF – Tai Streets 16-yard pass from Jeff Garcia (Jeff Chandler kick) **SF 7–0**
- STL – Torry Holt 11-yard pass from Marc Bulger (Jeff Wilkins kick) **TIED 7–7**

**2nd Quarter**

- SF – Jeff Chandler 35-yard field goal **SF 10–7**

**3rd Quarter**

- STL – Marshall Faulk 2-yard rush (Jeff Wilkins kick) **STL 14–10**
- SF – Kevan Barlow 19-yard rush (Jeff Chandler kick) **SF 17–14**

**4th Quarter**

- STL – Dane Looker 19-yard pass from Marc Bulger (Jeff Wilkins kick) **STL 21–17**
- STL – Jeff Wilkins 29-yard field goal **STL 24–17**
- SF – Terrell Owens 13-yard pass from Jeff Garcia (Jeff Chandler kick) **TIED 24–24**

**Overtime**

- STL – Jeff Wilkins 28-yard field goal **STL 27–24**

Coming off of a blowout, the 49ers played a tight match against the division rivals St. Louis Rams. It was a back-and-forth game, with the lead changing hands four times. The 49ers scored a game-tying touchdown late in the fourth quarter with a pass to Terrell Owens. In overtime, the Rams' Jeff Wilkins kicked a 28-yard (26 m) field goal to win the game, the team overcoming their four turnovers. The loss meant the 49ers started the season 1–1.

==== Week 3: vs. Cleveland Browns ====
Week 3: Cleveland Browns at San Francisco 49ers

Quarter	1	2	3	4	Total
**Browns**	0	0	0	13	**13**
49ers	0	6	3	3	**12**

at San Francisco Stadium at Candlestick Point

- Date: Sunday, September 21, 2003
- Game weather: 87 °F or 30.6 °C (Sunny)
- TV announcers (CBS): Greg Gumbel, Phil Simms, Armen Keteyian

Game information
**2nd Quarter**
- SF – Owen Pochman 38-yard field goal**SF 3–0**
- SF – Owen Pochman 44-yard field goal**SF 6–0**

**3rd Quarter**

- SF – Owen Pochman 36 field goal **SF 9–0**

**4th Quarter**

- SF – Owen Pochman 24-yard field goal **SF 12–0**
- CLE – André Davis 2-yard pass from Kelly Holcomb (Phil Dawson kick)**CLE 7–12**
- CLE - Andre Davis 11-yard pass from Kelly Holcomb (pass failed)**CLE 13-12**

In a low-scoring contest, the 49ers lost in the squeaker. After a scoreless first quarter, the 49ers struck first, however, they could not get into the end zone, scoring only four field goals. However, it appeared it would be sufficient; the 49ers led 12–0 in the final quarter. This would not be the case, though, as Browns’ quarterback Kelly Holcomb went on to throw two touchdown passes. Lossing dropped the 49ers to 1–2.

==== Week 4: at Minnesota Vikings ====
Week 4: San Francisco 49ers at Minnesota Vikings

Quarter	1	2	3	4	Total
49ers	0	0	0	7	**7**
**Vikings**	14	14	0	7	**35**

at Hubert H. Humphrey Metrodome, Minneapolis

- Date: Sunday, September 28, 2003
- Game weather: Played indoors (domed stadium)
- TV announcers (Fox): Joe Buck, Troy Aikman, Cris Collinsworth & Pam Oliver

Game information
**1st Quarter**
- MIN – Randy Moss 15-yard pass from Gus Frerotte (Aaron Elling kick) **MIN 7–0**
- MIN – Onterrio Smith 5-yard rush (Aaron Elling kick) **MIN 14–0**

**2nd Quarter**

- MIN – Randy Moss 35-yard pass from Gus Frerotte (Aaron Elling kick) **MIN 21–0**
- MIN – Nate Burleson 22-yard pass from Gus Frerotte (Aaron Elling kick) **MIN 28–0**

**4th Quarter**

- MIN – Randy Moss 59-yard pass from Gus Frerotte (Aaron Elling kick) **MIN 28–0**
- SF – Tai Streets 37-yard pass from Tim Rattay (Owen Pochman kick) **MIN 35–7**

Playing against the undefeated Vikings, the 49ers were unable to keep pace with their opponent. Scoring only in the final minutes of the fourth quarter, the 49ers were, at one point, behind 35–0. Several times the 49ers came within striking distance, however, three interceptions sealed their fate. The 49ers lost their third consecutive game and fell to 1–3.

==== Week 5: vs. Detroit Lions ====
Week 5: Detroit Lions at San Francisco 49ers

Quarter	1	2	3	4	Total
Lions	0	10	0	7	**17**
**49ers**	10	7	7	0	**24**

at San Francisco Stadium at Candlestick Point

- Date: Sunday, October 5, 2003
- Game weather: 71 °F or 21.7 °C (Partly cloudy)
- TV announcers (Fox): Kenny Albert & Brian Baldinger

Game information
**1st Quarter**
- SF – Terrell Owens 6-yard pass from Jeff Garcia (Owen Pochman kick) **SF 7–0**
- SF – Owen Pochman 48-yard field goal **SF 10–0**

**2nd Quarter**

- SF – Aaron Walker 14-yard pass from Jeff Garcia (Owen Pochman kick) **SF 17–0**
- DET – Jason Hanson 28-yard field goal **SF 17–3**
- DET – Mikhael Ricks 6-yard pass from Joey Harrington (Jason Hanson kick) **SF 17–10**

**3rd Quarter**

- SF – Jeff Garcia 1-yard rush (Owen Pochman kick) **SF 24–10**

**4th Quarter**

- DET – Olandis Gary 2-yard rush (Jason Hanson kick) **SF 24–17**

Attempting to snap a three-game losing streak, the 49ers hosted the Detroit Lions, who were led by former head coach Steve Mariucci. A game riddled with errors, the 49ers fumbled three times (recovery each time), Jeff Garcia threw an interception, and Joey Harrington tossed two. The Lions never led, with the 49ers opening up a 17–0 lead in the second quarter. With their first win since the season opener, the 49ers moved up to 2–3.

==== Week 6: at Seattle Seahawks ====
Week 6: San Francisco 49ers at Seattle Seahawks

Quarter	1	2	3	4	Total
49ers	0	3	13	3	**19**
**Seahawks**	7	10	0	3	**20**

at Qwest Field, Seattle

- Date: Sunday, October 12, 2003
- TV announcers (ESPN): Mike Patrick, Joe Theismann, Paul Maguire & Suzy Kolber

Game information
**1st Quarter**
- SEA – Itula Mili 15-yard pass from Matt Hasselbeck (Josh Brown kick)**SEA 7–0**

**2nd Quarter**

- SEA – Josh Brown 27-yard field goal **SEA 10–0**
- SEA – Mack Strong 21-yard rush (Josh Brown kick) **SEA 17–0**
- SF – Owen Pochman 42-yard field goal **SEA 17–3**

**3rd Quarter**

- SF – Garrison Hearst 6-yard rush (Owen Pochman kick) **SEA 17–10**
- SF – Jeff Garcia 2-yard rush (kick failed) **SEA 17–16**

**4th Quarter**

- SF – Owen Pochman 33-yard field goal **SF 19–17**
- SEA – Josh Brown 37-yard field goal **SEA 20–19**

For the second time in four games, the 49ers lost by a one-point differential. Playing against the division rival Seahawks, the 49ers fell behind 17–0 before halftime and had to play catch up in the second half. Slowly closing the gap, the 49ers scored 19 straight points to take the lead 19–17. However, the defense was unable to stop the Seahawks' 2-minute drill as Seattle's team drove into field goal range and scored the game-winning field goal off the foot of kicker Josh Brown and on the final drive of the game, Garrison Hearst fumbled the ball away at their own 43-yard-line to seal the loss. With the loss, the 49ers fell to 2–4.

==== Week 7: vs. Tampa Bay Buccaneers ====
Week 7: Tampa Bay Buccaneers at San Francisco 49ers

Quarter	1	2	3	4	Total
Buccaneers	7	0	0	0	**7**
**49ers**	7	14	0	3	**24**

at San Francisco Stadium at Candlestick Point

- Date: Sunday, October 19, 2003
- Game weather: 73 °F or 22.8 °C (Sunny)
- TV announcers (Fox): Curt Menefee & Tim Green

Game information
**1st Quarter**
- SF – Garrison Hearst 7-yard rush (Owen Pochman kick) **SF 7–0**
- TB – Keenan McCardell 75-yard pass from Brad Johnson (Martin Gramatica kick) **TIED 7–7**

**2nd Quarter**

- SF – Tai Streets 14-yard pass from Jeff Garcia (Owen Pochman kick) **SF 14–7**
- SF – Terrell Owens 75-yard pass from Jeff Garcia (Owen Pochman kick) **SF 21–7**

**4th Quarter**

- SF – Owen Pochman 27-yard field goal **SF 24–7**

Hosting the defending Super Bowl champions, the Tampa Bay Buccaneers, the 49ers got their third win of the season, knocking off the Buccaneers 24–7. The 49ers led the entire game and statistically dominated on both sides of the ball, both scoring often and forcing turnovers. Both teams were able to score touchdowns on passes of 75 yards (69 m). With the victory, the 49ers moved to 3–4 on the season.

==== Week 8: at Arizona Cardinals ====
Week 8: San Francisco 49era at Arizona Cardinals

Quarter	1	2	3	4	OT	Total
49ers	6	0	0	7	0	**13**
**Cardinals**	7	3	3	0	3	**16**

at Sun Devil Stadium, Tempe, Arizona

- Date: Sunday, October 26, 2003
- TV announcers (Fox): Curt Menefee & Tim Green

Game information
**1st Quarter**
- SF – Jeff Garcia 21-yard rush (pass failed) **SF 6–0**
- AZ – Jeff Blake 1-yard rush (Tim Duncan kick) **AZ 7–6**

**2nd Quarter**

- AZ – Tim Duncan 53-yard field goal **AZ 10–6**

**3rd Quarter**

- AZ – Tim Duncan 20-yard field goal **AZ 13–6**

**4th Quarter**

- SF – Kwame Harris 1-yard fumble return (Owen Pochman kick) **TIED 13–13**

**Overtime**

- AZ – Tim Duncan 39-yard field goal **AZ 16–13**

In an attempt to win their second consecutive game for the first time this season, the 49ers traveled to Arizona to play against their division rival, the Cardinals. The game was close throughout, being tied up in the fourth quarter off a one-yard fumble return for a touchdown. However, it was decided in Arizona's favor in overtime with a 39-yard (36 m) field goal. In that game, kicker Owen Pochman missed two field goals and an extra point, and would be replaced by Todd Peterson for the rest of the season. With the loss, the 49ers instead of improving to .500, they dropped to 3–5.

==== Week 9: vs. St. Louis Rams ====
Week 9: St. Louis Rams at San Francisco 49ers

Quarter	1	2	3	4	Total
Rams	3	0	0	7	**10**
**49ers**	14	10	6	0	**30**

at San Francisco Stadium at Candlestick Point

- Date: Sunday, November 2, 2003
- Game weather: 55 °F or 12.8 °C (Mostly cloudy)
- TV announcers (Fox): Dick Stockton, Daryl Johnston & Tony Siragusa

Game information
**1st Quarter**
- SF – Cedrick Wilson 95-yard kickoff return (Todd Peterson kick) **SF 7–0**
- STL – Jeff Wilkins 39-yard field goal **SF 7–3**
- SF – Terrell Owens 5-yard pass from Tim Rattay (Todd Peterson kick) **SF 14–3**

**2nd Quarter**

- SF – Todd Peterson 44-yard field goal **SF 17–3**
- SF – Brandon Lloyd 27-yard pass from Tim Rattay (Todd Peterson kick) **SF 24–3**

**3rd Quarter**

- SF – Tai Streets 5-yard pass from Tim Rattay (kick failed) **SF 30–3**

**4th Quarter**

- STL – Torry Holt 41-yard pass from Marc Bulger (Jeff Wilkins kick) **SF 30–10**

Playing their second straight game against a division rival, the 49ers hosted the St. Louis Rams. The 49ers kick returner Cedrick Wilson returned the opening kick 95 yards (87 m) for a touchdown and the 49ers would not relinquish their lead. The 49ers offense became potent, opening up a 30–3 lead in the third quarter. The win brought the 49ers up to 4–5 heading into their bye week.

==== Week 11: vs. Pittsburgh Steelers ====
Week 11: Pittsburgh Steelers at San Francisco 49ers

Quarter	1	2	3	4	Total
Steelers	0	0	7	7	**14**
**49ers**	7	3	14	6	**30**

at San Francisco Stadium at Candlestick Point

- Date: Monday, November 17, 2003
- Game weather: 54 °F or 12.2 °C (Clear)
- TV announcers (ABC): Al Michales & John Madden

Game information
**1st Quarter**
- SF – Terrell Owens 61-yard pass from Tim Rattay (Todd Peterson kick) **SF 7–0**

**2nd Quarter**

- SF – Todd Peterson 32-yard field goal **SF 10–0**

**3rd Quarter**

- PIT – Jerome Bettis 1-yard rush (Jeff Reed kick) **SF 10–7**
- SF – Kevan Barlow 78-yard rush (Todd Peterson kick) **SF 17–7**
- SF – Fred Beasley 28-yard pass from Tim Rattay (Todd Peterson kick) **SF 24–7**

**4th Quarter**

- SF – Todd Peterson 22-yard field goal **SF 27–7**
- SF – Todd Peterson 44-yard field goal **SF 30–7**
- PIT – Antwaan Randle El 32-yard pass from Tommy Maddox (Jeff Reed kick) **SF 30–14**

Coming off their bye, the 49ers strung together their second straight victory, this time over the Pittsburgh Steelers. The 49ers shut out the Steelers in the first half, leading 10–0 at halftime. The Steelers offense came together in the second half to put some points on the board, statistically leading the 49ers, however it wasn't enough to close the gap. The 49ers' victory brought them to 5–5.

==== Week 12: at Green Bay Packers ====
Week 12: San Francisco 49ers at Green Bay Packers

Quarter	1	2	3	4	Total
49ers	0	3	7	0	**10**
**Packers**	7	10	0	3	**20**

at Lambeau Field, Green Bay, Wisconsin

- Date: Sunday, November 23, 2003
- TV announcers (Fox): Dick Stockton, Daryl Johnston & Tony Siragusa

Game information
**1st Quarter**
- GB – Javon Walker 66-yard pass from Brett Favre (Ryan Longwell kick) **GB 7–0**

**2nd Quarter**

- GB – Robert Ferguson 16-yard pass from Brett Favre (Ryan Longwell kick) **GB 14–0**
- SF – Todd Peterson 24-yard field goal **GB 14–3**
- GB – Ryan Longwell 38-yard field goal **GB 17–3**

**3rd Quarter**

- SF – Terrell Owens 24-yard pass from Tim Rattay (Todd Peterson kick) **GB 17–10**

**4th Quarter**

- GB – Ryan Longwell 37-yard field goal **GB 20–10**

After completing their first two-game win streak of the season, the 49ers traveled in Week 12 to their conference rival Green Bay Packers. The Packers dominated on both sides of the ball, leading 17–3 at the half. Despite forcing Brett Favre into throwing three interceptions, the 49ers offense could only manage 192 total yards, a majority coming off the performance of their two star players, Garrison Hearst and Terrell Owens. Losing dropped the 49ers back under .500, at 5–6.

==== Week 13: at Baltimore Ravens ====
Week 13: San Francisco 49ers at Baltimore Ravens

Quarter	1	2	3	4	Total
49ers	3	3	0	0	**6**
**Ravens**	7	17	0	20	**44**

at M&T Bank Stadium, Baltimore

- Date: Sunday, November 30, 2003
- TV announcers (Fox): Sam Rosen & Bill Maas

Game information
**1st Quarter**
- BAL – Jamal Lewis 6-yard rush (Matt Stover kick) **BAL 7–0**
- SF – Todd Peterson 48-yard field goal **BAL 7–3**

**2nd Quarter**

- SF – Todd Peterson 40-yard field goal **BAL 7–6**
- BAL – Matt Stover 28-yard field goal **BAL 10–6**
- BAL – Marcus Robinson 38-yard pass from Anthony Wright (Matt Stover kick) **BAL 17–6**
- BAL – Ray Lewis 29-yard interception return (Matt Stover kick) **BAL 24–6**

**4th Quarter**

- BAL – Matt Stover 47-yard field goal **BAL 27–6**
- BAL – Terry Jones 6-yard pass from Anthony Wright (Matt Stover kick) **BAL 34–6**
- BAL – Matt Stover 41-yard field goal **BAL 37–6**
- BAL – Musa Smith 2-yard rush (Matt Stover kick) **BAL 44–6**

The 49ers were dismantled by the Ravens easily, 44–6, with the 49ers limited to only two field goals. The 49ers were plagued with turnovers, quarterback Jeff Garcia throwing four interceptions, one of which was returned 29 yards (27 m) for a touchdown by Ray Lewis. With the loss, the 49ers fell to 5–7, including six losses on the road.

==== Week 14: vs. Arizona Cardinals ====
Week 14: Arizona Cardinals at San Francisco 49ers

Quarter	1	2	3	4	Total
Cardinals	0	0	7	7	**14**
**49ers**	14	20	9	7	**50**

at San Francisco Stadium at Candlestick Point

- Date: Sunday, December 7, 2003
- Game weather: 55 °F or 12.8 °C (Sunny)
- TV announcers (Fox): Curt Menefee & Tim Green

Game information
**1st Quarter**
- SF – Jeff Garcia 3-yard rush (Todd Peterson kick) **SF 7–0**
- SF – Terrell Owens 1-yard pass from Jeff Garcia (Todd Peterson kick) **SF 14–0**

**2nd Quarter**

- SF – Tai Streets 18-yard pass from Jeff Garcia (Todd Peterson kick) **SF 21–0**
- SF – Cedrick Wilson 27-yard pass from Jeff Garcia (kick failed) **SF 27–0**
- SF – Terrell Owens 2-yard pass from Jeff Garcia (Todd Peterson kick) **SF 34–0**

**3rd Quarter**

- SF – Josh McCown fumbles, recovered by Marcel Shipp in end zone for a safety **SF 36–0**
- AZ – James Hodgins 3-yard pass from Josh McCown (Neil Rackers kick) **36–7**
- SF – Jeff Garcia 4-yard rush (Todd Peterson kick) **SF 43–7**

**4th Quarter**

- SF – Kevan Barlow 46-yard rush (Todd Peterson kick) **SF 50–7**
- AZ – Anquan Boldin 16-yard pass from Josh McCown (Neil Rackers kick) **SF 50–14**

After an embarrassing loss, the 49ers regrouped to win 50–14 against their division rival Arizona Cardinals. The 49ers’ offense dominated throughout the game, at one point leading 36–0 and rolling up nearly 500 yards (460 m) of total offense. A rare safety was also scored, just after halftime. The defense also performed well, forcing two fumbles. With the win, the 49ers climbed to 6–7 on the season.

==== Week 15: at Cincinnati Bengals ====
Week 15: San Francisco 49ers at Cincinnati Bengals

Quarter	1	2	3	4	Total
49ers	0	17	0	21	**38**
**Bengals**	7	14	10	10	**41**

at Paul Brown Stadium, Cincinnati

- Date: Sunday, December 14, 2003
- TV announcers (Fox): Ron Pitts & Tim Ryan

Game information
**1st Quarter**
- CIN – Chad Johnson 10-yard pass from Jon Kitna (Shayne Graham kick) **CIN 7–0**

**2nd Quarter**

- CIN – Kevin Hardy 10-yard fumble return (Shayne Graham kick) **CIN 14–0**
- SF – Terrell Owens 58-yard pass from Jeff Garcia (Todd Peterson kick) **CIN 14–7**
- SF – Tai Streets 41-yard pass from Jeff Garcia (Todd Peterson kick) **TIED 14–14**
- CIN – Peter Warrick 31-yard pass from Jon Kitna (Shayne Graham kick) **CIN 21–14**
- SF – Todd Peterson 23-yard field goal **CIN 21–17**

**3rd Quarter**

- CIN – Rudi Johnson 49-yard rush (Shayne Graham kick) **CIN 28–17**
- CIN – Shayne Graham 34-yard field goal **31–17**

**4th Quarter**

- SF – Jeff Garcia 6-yard rush (Todd Peterson kick) **CIN 31–24**
- CIN – Shayne Graham 30-yard field goal **CIN 34–24**
- SF – Kevan Barlow 1-yard rush (Todd Peterson kick) **CIN 34–31**
- CIN – Rudi Johnson 3-yard rush (Shayne Graham kick) **CIN 41–31**
- SF – Kevan Barlow 3-yard rush (Todd Peterson kick) **CIN 41–38**

A high-scoring shootout, the 49ers were slightly outscored by the Bengals, 41–38. The 49ers topped 500 yards (460 m) of total offense, but surprisingly never led in this close game. This can be partially attributed to their four fumbles, three of which were lost to the Bengals. One fumble was returned 10 yards (9.1 m) for a touchdown by Bengals' Kevin Hardy. The loss meant the 49ers fell to 6–8. Of the 49ers' season, this was the 13th time in 14 games in which the home team won (including the last 11 games), the home team outscoring the visitor 422–199 so far this season.

==== Week 16: at Philadelphia Eagles ====
Week 16: San Francisco 49ers at Philadelphia Eagles

Quarter	1	2	3	4	OT	Total
**49ers**	7	7	3	11	3	**31**
Eagles	0	14	7	7	0	**28**

at Lincoln Financial Field, Philadelphia

- Date: Sunday, December 21, 2003
- TV announcers (Fox): Joe Buck, Troy Aikman, Cris Collinsworth & Pam Oliver

Game information
**1st Quarter**
- SF – Kevan Barlow 15-yard pass from Jeff Garcia (Todd Peterson kick) **SF 7–0**

**2nd Quarter**

- PHI – Duce Staley 7-yard rush (David Akers kick) **TIED 7–7**
- PHI – Duce Staley 1-yard rush (David Akers kick) **PHI 14–7**
- SF – Brandon Lloyd 33-yard pass from Jeff Garcia (Todd Peterson kick) **TIED 14–14**

**3rd Quarter**

- PHI – Brian Westbrook 81-yard punt return (David Akers kick) **PHI 21–14**
- SF – Todd Peterson 33-yard field goal **PHI 21–17**

**4th Quarter**

- SF – Todd Peterson 25-yard field goal **PHI 21–20**
- SF – Kevan Barlow 1-yard rush (Brandon Lloyd pass from Jeff Garcia) **SF 28–21**
- PHI – Todd Pinkston 19-yard pass from Donovan McNabb (David Akers kick) **TIED 28–28**

**Overtime**

- SF – Todd Peterson 22-yard field goal **SF 31–28**

Another squeaker, this game marked the sixth time this season the 49ers played a game that was decided three points or less, and the only one of those six in which the 49ers walked away with a victory. The 49ers outgained the Eagles, 414 to 293, and dominated in time of possession, but they failed to put away the Eagles in regulation due largely to three special teams miscues by punter Bill LaFleur: a fumbled hold on a first-quarter field goal attempt, a punt returned 81 yards for a touchdown by Brian Westbrook, and an 8-yard punt that set up an Eagles touchdown. But the 49ers were able to win when kicker Todd Peterson from 22 yards (20 m) out during overtime. With the victory, the 49ers moved up to 7–8.

==== Week 17: vs. Seattle Seahawks ====
Week 17: Seattle Seahawks at San Francisco 49ers

Quarter	1	2	3	4	Total
**Seahawks**	0	14	7	3	**24**
49ers	0	14	3	0	**17**

at San Francisco Stadium at Candlestick Point

- Date: Saturday, December 27, 2003
- Game weather: 49 °F or 9.4 °C (Partly Cloudy)
- TV announcers (Fox): Dick Stockton, Daryl Johnston & Tony Siragusa

Game information
**2nd Quarter**
- SF – Jed Weaver 18-yard pass from Jeff Garcia (Todd Peterson kick) **SF 7–0**
- SF – Cedrick Wilson 14-yard pass from Jeff Garcia (Todd Peterson kick) **SF 14–0**
- SEA – Alex Bannister 31-yard pass from Matt Hasselbeck (Josh Brown kick) **SF 14–7**
- SEA – Shaun Alexander 3-yard rush (Josh Brown kick) **TIED 14–14**

**3rd Quarter**

- SF – Todd Peterson 38-yard field goal **SF 17–14**
- SEA – Koren Robinson 30-yard pass from Matt Hasselbeck (Josh Brown kick) **SEA 21–17**
- SEA – Josh Brown 33-yard field goal **SEA 24–17**

The last game of the season, the 49ers hosted division rival Seattle Seahawks. The game was tied at the end of the first quarter and again at halftime, but the 49ers were unable to keep in during the second half. With the loss, the 49ers clinched a losing season, at 7–9, after winning the division the previous year.

=== Standings ===
NFC West
	W	L	T	PCT	DIV	CONF	PF	PA	STK
^{(2)} St. Louis Rams	12	4	0	.750	4–2	8–4	447	328	L1
^{(5)} Seattle Seahawks	10	6	0	.625	5–1	8–4	404	327	W2
San Francisco 49ers	7	9	0	.438	2–4	6–6	384	337	L1
Arizona Cardinals	4	12	0	.250	1–5	3–9	225	452	W1
