= 2000 San Francisco 49ers season =

American football team season

- Owner: Edward J. DeBartolo Jr.
- General manager: Bill Walsh
- Head coach: Steve Mariucci
- Offensive coordinator: Marty Mornhinweg
- Defensive coordinator: Jim L. Mora
- Home stadium: 3Com Park

Results
- Record: 6–10
- Division place: 4th NFC West
- Playoffs: Did not qualify
- All-Pros: Terrell Owens (1st team)
- Pro Bowlers: QB Jeff Garcia; WR Terrell Owens; RB Charlie Garner

Uniform
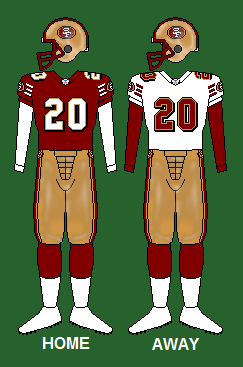

The 2000 San Francisco 49ers season was the franchise's 51st season in the National Football League (NFL) and their 55th overall. Jerry Rice entered the 2000 season as the oldest player in the league at the wide receiver position. At the end of the year, however, with the emergence of Terrell Owens, Rice decided to leave the 49ers after sixteen seasons to join the Oakland Raiders for the 2001 season, marking the first season since 1984 that Rice would not be on the opening day roster. Running back Charlie Garner would later join Rice in Oakland, marking the first season since 1998, when he was with the team that drafted him, the Philadelphia Eagles, that Garner would not be on the opening day roster either.

The 49ers improved from 4–12 in 1999 to 6–10, but still suffered back-to-back losing seasons for the first time since their four consecutive losing seasons from 1977 to 1980.

This was the first season since 1986 that Steve Young was not on the opening day roster, as he retired after the 1999 season due to a season-and career-ending concussion against the Arizona Cardinals in Week 3 of that season. Without Young taking the reins in San Francisco anymore, the 49ers fully relied on second-year quarterback Jeff Garcia, who enjoyed his best year and was named to the Pro Bowl at the end of the season.

This would also be the final season for the 49ers under the ownership of Eddie DeBartolo Jr., as he would sell the team to his sister Denise and her husband John York after the season.

== Offseason ==
Additions	Subtractions
QB Rick Mirer (Jets)	QB Steve Young (retirement)
WR Kevin Williams (Bills)	LB Lee Woodall (Panthers)
DE Anthony Pleasant (Jets)	DE Charles Haley (retirement)
T Scott Gragg (Giants)	LB Chris Draft (Falcons)
	S Tim McDonald (retirement)
	CB R. W. McQuarters (Bears)

=== NFL draft ===
2000 San Francisco 49ers draft
Round	Pick	Player	Position	College	Notes
1	16	Julian Peterson *	Linebacker	Michigan State	
1	24	Ahmed Plummer	Cornerback	Ohio State	
2	35	John Engelberger	Defensive end	Virginia Tech	
2	48	Jason Webster	Cornerback	Texas A&M	
3	65	Giovanni Carmazzi	Quarterback	Hofstra	
3	86	Jeff Ulbrich	Linebacker	Hawaii	
4	108	John Keith	Safety	Furman	
5	132	Paul Smith	Fullback	UTEP	
5	150	John Milem	Defensive end	Lenoir–Rhyne	
7	212	Tim Rattay	Quarterback	Louisiana Tech	
7	230	Brian Jennings	Long snapper	Arizona State	
Made roster * Made at least one Pro Bowl during career

=== Undrafted free agents ===
2000 undrafted free agents of note
Player	Position	College
Mikki Allen	Safety	Tennessee
Jermaine Arrington	Wide receiver	Maryland
Nathaniel Bell	Defensive end	Southern
Dwight Carter	Wide receiver	Hawaii
Eric Chew	Wide receiver	McNeese State
Terrence Dupree	Tight end	Duke
Jim Emanuel	Linebacker	Hofstra
Chafie Fields	Wide receiver	Penn State
Dan Goodspeed	Tackle	Kent State
Ricky Hall	Wide receiver	Virginia Tech
Ronnie Heard	Safety	Ole Miss
Marcus Hill	Safety	Angelo State
Tyronn Johnson	Defensive tackle	Florida A&M
Cedric Killings	Defensive tackle	Carson–Newman
Jason Lamar	Linebacker	Toledo
Jonas Lewis	Running back	San Diego State
Dyral McMillan	Running back	South Florida
Tommy Parks	Punter	Mississippi State
Greg Payne	Defensive Back	Arizona
Trey Pennington	Tight end	South Carolina
Danny Scott	Defensive end	Louisiana–Lafayette
Josh White	Fullback	California
Antonio Williams	Defensive Line	South Carolina State
Griff Yates	Running back	Southern Oregon

== Personnel ==
=== Staff ===
2000 San Francisco 49ers staff
Front office: Owner – Denise DeBartolo York; Owner – The DeBartolo Corporation; Director/owner's representative – John York; President/chief executive officer – Peter L. Harris; Vice president/general manager – Bill Walsh; Vice president/director of football operations – John McVay; Assistant general manager – Terry Donahue; Director of pro personnel – Bill McPherson; Head coaches: Head coach – Steve Mariucci; Offensive coaches: Offensive coordinator – Marty Mornhinweg; Quarterbacks – Greg Knapp; Running backs – Tom Rathman; Wide receivers – George Stewart; Tight ends – Tom Batta; Offensive line – Patrick Morris; Offensive assistant – Andy Sugarman	Defensive coaches: Defensive coordinator – Jim Mora; Defensive line – Dwaine Board; Linebackers – Richard Smith; Assistant secondary – Brett Maxie; Defensive assistant – Chris Beake; Defensive quality control – Joe Barry; Special teams coaches: Special teams – Bruce DeHaven; Strength and conditioning: Physical development coordinator – Jerry Attaway

=== Roster ===
2000 San Francisco 49ers roster
Quarterbacks (QB): 19 Giovanni Carmazzi; 5 Jeff Garcia; 3 Rick Mirer; 13 Tim Rattay; Running backs (RB): 40 Fred Beasley FB; 25 Charlie Garner; 20 Garrison Hearst; 22 Terry Jackson; 43 Jonas Lewis; 27 Paul Smith FB; Wide receivers (WR): 81 Terrell Owens; 80 Jerry Rice; 83 J.J. Stokes; 89 Tai Streets; 82 Kevin Williams; Tight ends (TE): 85 Greg Clark; 88 Justin Swift	Offensive linemen (OL): 65 Ray Brown G; 63 Derrick Deese T; 79 Dan Dercher T; 74 Dave Fiore G; 78 Scott Gragg T; 66 Tyrone Hopson G; 60 Ben Lynch C; 62 Jeremy Newberry C; 69 Phil Ostrowski G; 77 Matt Willig T; Defensive linemen (DL): 99 Brentson Buckner DT; 95 John Engelberger DE; 76 Nate Hobgood-Chittick DT; 71 Cedric Killings DT; 92 Reggie McGrew DT; 93 John Milem DE; 91 Chike Okeafor DE; 94 Anthony Pleasant DE; 97 Bryant Young DT	Linebackers (LB): 57 Jason Kyle MLB; 51 Ken Norton Jr. MLB; 98 Julian Peterson OLB; 96 Jeff Posey OLB; 55 Winfred Tubbs OLB; 50 Artie Ulmer OLB; Defensive backs (DB): 31 Zack Bronson FS; 38 Ronnie Heard SS; 24 Monty Montgomery CB; 33 Jason Moore SS; 26 Anthony Parker CB; 29 Ahmed Plummer CB; 23 Pierson Prioleau FS; 36 Jason Webster CB; Special teams (ST): 86 Brian Jennings LS; 7 Wade Richey K; 4 Chad Stanley P	Practice squad: 14 Dwight Carter WR; 75 Matt Keneley DT; Reserve: 90 Junior Bryant DT (IR); 67 Chris Dalman C (IR); 84 Terrence Dupree TE (IR); 32 Travis Jervey RB (IR); 28 John Keith S (IR); 30 Lance Schulters S (IR); 53 Jeff Ulbrich LB (IR); Rookies in italics 53 active, 7 reserve, 2 practice squad

== Preseason ==
Week	Date	Opponent	Result	Record	Venue
HOF	July 31	vs. New England Patriots	L 0–20	0–1	Fawcett Stadium (Canton, Ohio)
1	August 5	San Diego Chargers	L 20–23	0–2	3Com Park
2	August 13	at Kansas City Chiefs	W 33–10	1–2	Arrowhead Stadium
3	August 20	at Seattle Seahawks	L 21–25	1–3	Husky Stadium
4	August 25	Denver Broncos	L 24–28	1–4	3Com Park

== Regular season ==
=== Schedule ===
Week	Date	Opponent	Result	Record	Venue	Attendance
1	September 3	at **Atlanta Falcons**	**L** 28–36	0–1	Georgia Dome	54,626
2	September 10	**Carolina Panthers**	**L** 22–38	0–2	3Com Park	66,879
3	September 17	at **St. Louis Rams**	**L** 24–41	0–3	Trans World Dome	65,945
4	September 24	at Dallas Cowboys	**W** 41–24	1–3	Texas Stadium	64,127
5	October 1	Arizona Cardinals	**W** 27–20	2–3	3Com Park	66,985
6	October 8	Oakland Raiders	**L** 28–34 (OT)	2–4	3Com Park	68,344
7	October 15	at Green Bay Packers	**L** 28–31	2–5	Lambeau Field	59,870
8	October 22	at **Carolina Panthers**	**L** 16–34	2–6	Ericcson Stadium	61,350
9	October 29	**St. Louis Rams**	**L** 24–34	2–7	3Com Park	68,109
10	November 5	at **New Orleans Saints**	**L** 15–31	2–8	Louisiana Superdome	64,900
11	November 12	Kansas City Chiefs	**W** 21–7	3–8	3Com Park	68,002
12	November 19	**Atlanta Falcons**	**W** 16–6	4–8	3Com Park	67,447
13	Bye					
14	December 3	at San Diego Chargers	**W** 45–17	5–8	Qualcomm Stadium	57,255
15	December 10	**New Orleans Saints**	**L** 27–31	5–9	3Com Park	67,892
16	December 17	Chicago Bears	**W** 17–0	6–9	3Com Park	68,306
17	December 23	at Denver Broncos	**L** 9–38	6–10	Mile High Stadium	76,098
Note: Intra-division opponents are in **bold** text.

=== Game summaries ===
==== Week 1: at Atlanta Falcons ====
Jeff Garcia opened scoring on a four-yard touchdown to Fred Beasley but after four consecutive Morten Anderson field goals the Falcons got touchdown catches from Terance Mathis and Shawn Jefferson while Ashley Ambrose picked off Garcia and scored. Beasley and Terrell Owens caught additional San Francisco touchdowns in the 36–28 loss.

==== Week 2: vs. Carolina Panthers ====
San Francisco's home opener was a disaster as four straight Panthers touchdowns ultimately led to a 38–22 Niners loss. With the game out of reach Garcia was benched and former Seahawks washout Rick Mirer completed a touchdown to J. J. Stokes and a two-point conversion throw to Owens on a subsequent Fred Beasley score.

==== Week 3: at St. Louis Rams ====
The Niners led 10–3 and closed to 27–24 but the defending Super Bowl champs put the game away 41–24. Garcia was intercepted twice, the second time at the Rams goal line with 47 seconds to go.

==== Week 4: at Dallas Cowboys ====
Team	1	2	3	4	Total
• 49ers	3	14	10	14	41
Cowboys	0	10	0	14	24

- Date: September 24
- Location: Texas Stadium
- Game attendance: 64,127
- Game weather: Clear
- Referee: Jeff Triplette
- TV announcers (FOX): Kenny Albert, Tim Green, Mike Doocy

Scoring summary
Q1	1:16	SF	Richey 38 yard field goal	SF 3–0
Q2	11:13	DAL	Seder 40 yard field goal	Tie 3–3
Q2	7:02	SF	Garner 1 yard run (Richey kick)	SF 10–3
Q2	2:49	SF	Owens 3 yard pass from Garcia (Richey kick)	SF 17–3
Q2	1:42	DAL	Smith 1 yard run (Seder kick)	SF 17–10
Q3	13:14	SF	Rice 68 yard pass from Garcia (Richey kick)	SF 24–10
Q3	10:43	SF	Richey 47 yard field goal	SF 27–10
Q4	14:15	SF	Rice 5 yard pass from Garcia (Richey kick)	SF 34–10
Q4	11:08	DAL	Harris 11 yard pass from Aikman (Seder kick)	SF 34–17
Q4	4:05	SF	Owens 1 yard pass from Garcia (Richey kick)	SF 41–17
Q4	3:23	DAL	Harris 16 yard pass from Stoerner (Seder kick)	SF 41–24

- Charlie Garner 36 Rush, 201 Yds

- Terrell Owens poses on the midfield star

This was the game famous for Terrell Owens posing on the Cowboys mid-field star after his first touchdown of the game. This led to a more emphatic gesture by Emmitt Smith when he scored as he slammed the ball securely to the star. When Owens scored again he repeated his gesture then was hammered by George Teague in response.

Though the Niners won 41–24 it was a costly affair for coach Steve Mariucci; not only was Owens suspended for their following game (creating a rift between the two) but Mariucci clashed with an enraged Jerry Rice during the game, Rice angry after coming into the game with only eleven catches – in a bigger irony Rice would catch two touchdowns.

==== Week 5: vs. Arizona Cardinals ====
The Niners led wire to wire in winning 27–20. Jerry Rice led Niners receivers with seven catches for 66 yards and a touchdown.

==== Week 6: vs. Oakland Raiders ====
The two Bay Area NFL teams met for only the ninth time and first since the Raiders returned to Oakland. After two Sebastian Janikowski field goals the Niners took a 14–6 lead on scores to Owens and Rice. In the third after a Tyrone Wheatley score and two pointer tied the game the Raiders forced a fumble, completed a deep strike to Andre Rison, then Tim Brown caught a 30-yard score. The Raiders next scored on a Rich Gannon run. Garcia then completed a touchdown to Owens where he outmaneuvered five Raiders defenders. A missed Janikowski attempt led to the tying Niners score. In overtime Janikowski missed again but Wade Richey’s kick was blocked and in the ensuing Raiders drive Brown caught the game-winning touchdown (34–28 final).

==== Week 7: at Green Bay Packers ====
San Francisco’s perennial struggle against the Packers continued in a competitive game as Jeff Garcia threw four touchdowns in erasing a 21–7 gap then tying the game at 28 in the final five minutes. The Packers faced third down only once on their final field goal drive and Garcia’s final pass to Charlie Garner reached the Packers 28.

==== Week 8: at Carolina Panthers ====
The Niners in a 34–16 loss were swept for the second straight season, second time by their former coach, and third time in the six seasons of the Panthers’ existence. Steve Beuerlein had three touchdown throws while Garcia had two scores and also a pick six by the Panthers' Mike Minter.

==== Week 9: vs. St. Louis Rams ====
With Trent Green forced to start in Kurt Warner's stead the Rams at Candlestick Park had themselves a battle as the Niners led four different times and Terrell Owens caught two scores. Green's score to Marshall Faulk in the third tied the game then after an exchange of punts Faulk caught another score. A Pete Stoyanovich field goal made for a 34–24 Niners loss.

==== Week 10: at New Orleans Saints ====
Former Bengals washout Jeff Blake threw three touchdowns and led five scoring drives to a 31–0 Saints lead, enough to absorb 15 points by the Niners who fell to 2–8 while the long-luckless Saints reached 6–3.

==== Week 11: vs. Kansas City Chiefs ====
The Niners ended their five-game slide and a two-game slide against Kansas City by scoring three times on the ground (by Charlie Garner and Jeff Garcia) in the second quarter, limiting the Chiefs to one touchdown while intercepting former 49ers quarterback Elvis Grbac once.

==== Week 12: vs. Atlanta Falcons ====
Jason Webster’s 70-yard pick six was the lone touchdown amid five field goals by both teams as the Niners ground out a 16–6 win. San Francisco sacked Chris Chandler four times.

==== Week 14: at San Diego Chargers ====
Off their bye week the Niners had an easy time of it, winning 45–17 as they intercepted Ryan Leaf four times. Watching from the sidelines was Leaf’s backup and a future Niners head coach, while Jerry Rice, embroiled in a salary cap dispute with the Niners front office, caught what would be his final two scores with the team that drafted him.

==== Week 15: vs. New Orleans Saints ====
The Saints were on their way to their best season in nearly a decade and took an important step in a 31–27 comeback win at San Francisco. Following a 69-yard Garcia touchdown to Terrell Owens the Saints mounted two touchdown drives and Garcia was intercepted with 23 seconds remaining.

==== Week 16: vs. Chicago Bears ====
Rumor of a Jerry Rice divorce from the Niners would come true subsequently as San Francisco’s last home game of the season saw a ceremony honoring Rice and Flash 80 caught seven passes for 76 yards. But it would be Terrell Owens who made history with twenty catches, setting a new NFL single-game record previously held by Tom Fears in 1950.

==== Week 17: at Denver Broncos ====
The Niners’ disappointing season ended in ugly fashion as the playoff-bound Broncos erupted to lead 38–0. The Niners ended their season and a 38–9 loss on a Garcia touchdown to J. J. Stokes in the final minute.

=== Standings ===
NFC West
	W	L	T	PCT	PF	PA	STK
^{(3)} New Orleans Saints	10	6	0	.625	354	305	L1
^{(6)} St. Louis Rams	10	6	0	.625	540	471	W1
Carolina Panthers	7	9	0	.438	310	310	L1
San Francisco 49ers	6	10	0	.375	388	422	L1
Atlanta Falcons	4	12	0	.250	252	413	W1

== Awards and records ==
- Jeff Garcia, Franchise Record, Most Passing Yards in One Season, 4,278 Passing Yards
- Charlie Garner, Franchise Record, Most Rushing Yards in One Game, 201 Rushing Yards (September 24, 2000)
- Terrell Owens, Franchise Record, Most Receptions in One Game, (20) (December 17, 2000)
- Terrell Owens, NFL Record, Most Receptions in One Game, (20) (December 17, 2000)
