= Jeff Garcia =

American football player (born 1970)

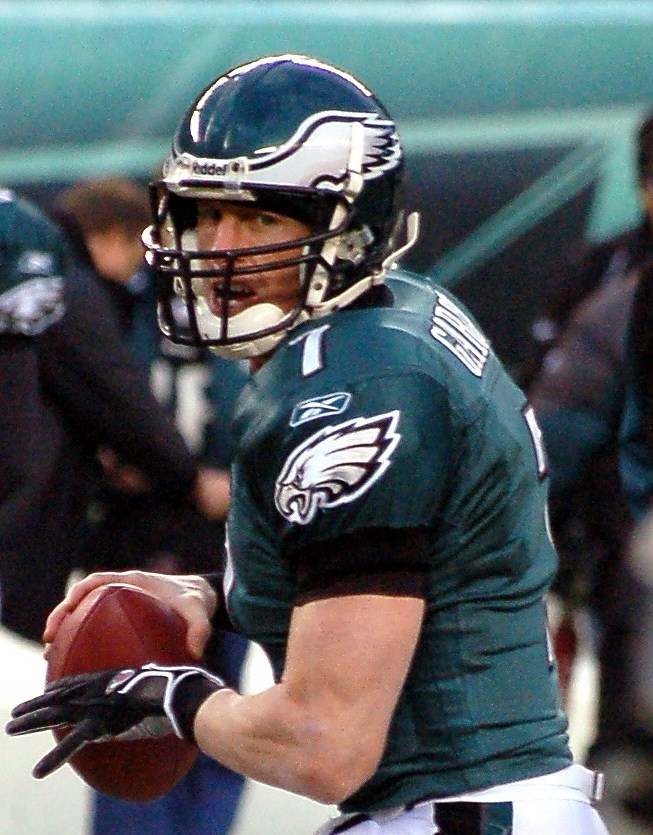
- Garcia with the Philadelphia Eagles in 2006

No. 5, 7, 9
- Position: Quarterback

Personal information
- Born: February 24, 1970 (age 56); Gilroy, California, U.S.
- Listed height: 6 ft 1 in (1.85 m)
- Listed weight: 205 lb (93 kg)

Career information
- High school: Gilroy
- College: Gavilan (1989); San Jose State (1990–1993)
- NFL draft: 1994: undrafted

Career history

Playing
- Calgary Stampeders (1994–1998); San Francisco 49ers (1999–2003); Cleveland Browns (2004); Detroit Lions (2005); Philadelphia Eagles (2006); Tampa Bay Buccaneers (2007–2008); Oakland Raiders (2009)*; Philadelphia Eagles (2009); Omaha Nighthawks (2010); Houston Texans (2011)
- * Offseason or practice squad member only

Coaching
- Montreal Alouettes (2014) Quarterbacks coach; St. Louis Rams (2015) Offensive assistant

Awards and highlights
- 4× Pro Bowl (2000–2002, 2007); NFL-record longest touchdown pass: 99 yards (tied); Grey Cup champion (1998); Grey Cup MVP (1998); 4× CFL West Division All-Star (1995–1998); Jeff Nicklin Memorial Trophy (1997)

Career NFL statistics
- Passing attempts: 3,676
- Passing completions: 2,264
- Completion percentage: 61.6%
- TD–INT: 161–83
- Passing yards: 25,537
- Passer rating: 87.5
- Rushing yards: 2,140
- Rushing touchdowns: 26
- Stats at Pro Football Reference

Career CFL statistics
- TD–INT: 111–52
- Passing yards: 16,442
- Passer rating: 94.9

Jeffrey Jason Garcia (born February 24, 1970) is an American former professional football player who was a quarterback in the National Football League (NFL) and Canadian Football League (CFL). After attending high school and junior college in Gilroy, California, Garcia played college football for the San Jose State Spartans.

A four-time CFL All-Star and four-time NFL Pro Bowl selection, Garcia began his professional football career with the CFL's Calgary Stampeders as an undrafted free agent in 1994. In 1999, Garcia debuted in the NFL with the San Francisco 49ers. With the 49ers, Garcia made three Pro Bowl appearances (for the 2000, 2001, and 2002 seasons) and led the team to the playoffs in the 2001 and 2002 seasons. Afterwards, Garcia encountered a low point in his career, starting with a lackluster 2003 season with San Francisco then two losing seasons with the Cleveland Browns in 2004 and the Detroit Lions in 2005. With the Philadelphia Eagles, Garcia returned to form late in the 2006 season, starting for an injured Donovan McNabb and leading Philadelphia to the playoffs. Garcia joined the Tampa Bay Buccaneers in 2007 and was the starting quarterback for most games of the 2007 and 2008 seasons. Again, Garcia led Tampa Bay to the playoffs in 2007 and made his fourth career Pro Bowl appearance.

After his stint with Tampa, Garcia returned to the Eagles in 2009 and played only one game. In 2010, Garcia played for the Omaha Nighthawks of the United Football League. In 2011, Garcia signed with the Houston Texans but did not play a game with the team. The following year, Garcia joined the advisory board for the now defunct United States Football League.

== Early life ==
Garcia attended Gilroy High School in Gilroy, California, and was a letterman in football and basketball. As a senior at Gilroy High, Garcia was a South Santa Clara County selection for the Charlie Wedemeyer All-Star Football Game and played defensive back in the game.

== College career ==
After graduating from Gilroy in 1988, Garcia attended Gavilan College, a local junior college. He was the starting quarterback on the football team for the 1989 season, in which he passed 2,038 yards for 18 touchdowns and rushed 584 yards for four touchdowns. After the season, Garcia earned junior college honorable mention All-America honors.

In 1990, Garcia transferred to San Jose State University and redshirted his first year there. From 1991 to 1993, Garcia was starting quarterback on the San Jose State Spartans football team. Under Garcia, San Jose State went 6–4–1 in 1991, 7–4 in 1992, and 2–9 in 1993. In 1991, Garcia had a career-high 61.9% completion rate at San Jose State with 99-for-160 passing for 1,519 yards, 12 touchdowns, and 5 interceptions. He passed for 2,418 yards in 1992 on 209-for-371 passing with 15 touchdowns and 11 interceptions and a career-high 2,608 yards in 1993 on 196-for-356 passing, 21 touchdowns, and 16 interceptions. For his junior season in 1992, Garcia earned UPI All-America honors. As of 2007, Garcia had the most career offensive yards (7,274) in San Jose State history.

== Professional career ==
Garcia is one of only eighteen quarterbacks in NFL history who have achieved two consecutive thirty-touchdown passing seasons (2000 and 2001) at least one time in his career. The others are Philip Rivers, Steve Bartkowski, Drew Brees, Peyton Manning, Brett Favre, Dan Fouts, Dan Marino, Tom Brady, Aaron Rodgers, Y. A. Tittle, Eli Manning, Tony Romo, Russell Wilson, Patrick Mahomes, Kirk Cousins, Josh Allen, Justin Herbert, and Joe Burrow. He is also one of only fourteen quarterbacks to throw a 99-yard touchdown pass.

=== Calgary Stampeders ===
At 6-foot-1 and 195 pounds, Garcia was considered too small for the National Football League and was not selected in the 1994 NFL draft. In 1994, Garcia started his professional career in Calgary with the Calgary Stampeders of the Canadian Football League. He won a place on Calgary's roster as their third-string quarterback behind Doug Flutie and Steve Taylor when he threw two fourth-quarter touchdowns in his exhibition game appearance in 1994; soon after, he was named backup quarterback to Flutie. Garcia took over as starter in 1995 when Flutie was sidelined midway through the season with an elbow injury. In his second start filling in for Flutie, Garcia set a team record with 546 passing yards and six touchdown passes in the Labour Day game against Edmonton touching off an eventual quarterback controversy among some fans when Flutie later returned. Flutie ended up starting over Garcia in the Grey Cup that year which the Stampeders lost. After Flutie signed as a free-agent with the Toronto Argonauts in 1996, Garcia took over as the Stampeders' starting quarterback. During Garcia's three years as starter, the Stampeders finished with records of 13–5, 10–8, and 12–6.

In 1997, Garcia won the Jeff Nicklin Memorial Trophy, an award given to the Most Outstanding Player in the CFL Western Division. Garcia led the Stampeders to the Western Final in 1996 and to the Western Semi-Final in 1997. In 1998, he led the team to the 86th Grey Cup and a victory over the Hamilton Tiger-Cats. He was named Grey Cup MVP. Garcia's performance included an 80-yard, game-ending drive to set up the game-winning field goal on the last play of the game. Garcia was also named as the 1998 CFL All-Star at quarterback.

Garcia was inducted to the Stampeders Wall of Fame on September 14, 2012, along with 5 others (Rudy Linterman, Gerry Shaw, Kelvin Anderson, Sig Gutsche, Norman Kwong).

=== San Francisco 49ers ===
==== 1999 ====
Following the Grey Cup victory, Garcia was signed as a backup to Steve Young with the San Francisco 49ers of the National Football League. Over the summer, he had been fighting for a spot on the roster, but early in the 1999 season, Young was hit by Arizona Cardinals cornerback Aeneas Williams and suffered his final professional concussion, knocking him out for the year. Garcia stepped in and shared time with former Stanford quarterback Steve Stenstrom finishing the season.

Garcia won his first NFL start against the Tennessee Titans 24–22. After being benched for poor performances, Garcia was reinstated as the starting quarterback and in the final five games of the regular season, finished by tossing 8 touchdown passes to only 2 interceptions. Garcia finished his rookie season with 11 touchdowns and 11 interceptions.

==== 2000 ====
The following season, with Young retired, and despite the 49ers drafting two quarterbacks (Giovanni Carmazzi in the third round and Tim Rattay in the seventh), Garcia kept the starting quarterback position and made his first Pro Bowl appearance. He set a new 49ers' team record with 4,278 passing yards in the 2000 season, although the team finished with a 6–10 record. Garcia finished the 2000 season, his first as a full-time starter with 31 touchdown passes to only 10 INTs. Garcia began the season on a tear, after 7 games, he had thrown for 19 touchdown passes, including 3 games of 4 touchdown passes.

==== 2001 ====
By the 2001 season, Garcia had become entrenched as the 49ers' starting quarterback. He had a career-high with 32 touchdown passes, including 21 over an eight-game span. With Garcia at quarterback, the 49ers made the playoffs, but fell to Green Bay 25–15 in the first round.

==== 2002 ====
2002 saw Garcia's offensive production drop from 31 and 32 TDs in the previous two seasons, to only 21. But even though Garcia's numbers dropped, the 49ers won the NFC West for the first time since 1997, with the division-clinching game coming on a last-second TD pass to Terrell Owens against the Dallas Cowboys. The 49ers trailed the Cowboys 27–17 with under 7 minutes left in the game before Garcia picked apart the Cowboy secondary for 2 touchdown passes (one to Tai Streets and the game winner to Owens). Garcia completed 36 of 55 passes for 276 yards and 3 4th-quarter touchdown passes in the division-clinching win.

On January 5, 2003, during the 2002–2003 playoffs, Garcia led the 49ers to a comeback win over the New York Giants, the second largest comeback victory in NFL playoff history. In the third quarter, the Giants were up 38–14, with about eighteen minutes left to play. Once the 49ers regained possession of the ball, they began a comeback that saw 25 unanswered points, with San Francisco taking a 39–38 lead. The Giants lost an opportunity to retake the lead after a controversial call, and the improbable victory became the signature game of Garcia's 49er career. He threw for 331 yards, 3 touchdowns, 1 interception, and also ran for 60 yards and 1 touchdown.

==== Garcia–Owens: 49er duo ====
Garcia's favorite target while with the 49ers was WR Terrell Owens. In 2003, Garcia and Owens's relationship turned sour upon Garcia taking issue with Owens's public praise for the play of backup quarterback Tim Rattay. Garcia responded with a cryptic "we cannot let the sickness spread" remark, prompting Owens to wear a surgeon's mask at the following practice. Following Owens's trade to Philadelphia, Owens was asked in a Playboy interview if he thought Garcia was gay, to which he responded, "If it looks like a rat and smells like a rat, by golly, it is a rat." Garcia called Owens' insinuations "ridiculous" and "untrue."

Following his 2004 trade to Philadelphia, Owens began speaking out and criticizing Garcia for the 49ers' offensive struggles during the 2003 season (the 49ers finished 7–9, with Garcia throwing 18 touchdowns and 13 interceptions during the season).

Garcia revealed on multiple occasions that the pressure of following in the footsteps of Joe Montana and Steve Young had gotten to him.

Upon his departure, Garcia said, "Have somebody step into my shoes and feel what I had to deal with throughout that whole time in San Francisco. The dust would start to settle, and all of a sudden, more fuel was thrown into the fire. It was such a negative situation."

In Owens' first season with Garcia as his quarterback, Owens caught 60 passes and went on to have campaigns of 97, 93, 100 and 80 receptions over the next four seasons, two times leading the league in touchdown catches.

==== 2003: Final season with 49ers ====
The 2003 season was a disappointment for Garcia and the 49ers. Following their 2002 playoff loss at the hands of the eventual Super Bowl Champion Tampa Bay Buccaneers, the 49ers fired head coach Steve Mariucci and replaced him with former Seattle Seahawks coach Dennis Erickson, who promised a wide open and vertical passing game.

Injuries to key players on both sides of the ball, and the often reckless play of Garcia, took a toll on him, as he missed three games during the season. The 49ers finished 7–9 and missed the playoffs for the first time in three seasons.

Following the 2003 season, Garcia was released.

=== Cleveland Browns ===
Garcia signed a contract with the Cleveland Browns on March 9, 2004. Garcia was released by the Browns after the 2004 season, in which he struggled to find any consistency and battled with injuries. On September 19, Garcia completed 8-of-27 passes for 71 yards and 3 interceptions in a 19–12 loss to the Dallas Cowboys, resulting in a career-low passer rating of 0. Despite his struggles, Garcia tied the record for longest career pass play (99 yards) on a completion to André Davis on October 17, in a win against the Cincinnati Bengals.

=== Detroit Lions ===
He was signed by the Detroit Lions to a one-year contract on March 12, 2005, to play for his former San Francisco head coach, Steve Mariucci, but Garcia broke his fibula in the fourth pre-season game against the Buffalo Bills on September 2. He started his first regular-season game as quarterback for the Lions on October 23, against his former teammates, the Browns. Garcia led the Lions to a 13–10 victory completing 22 of his 34 pass attempts for 210 yards, with one touchdown and zero interceptions.

After the win, Mariucci named Garcia the starting quarterback for the remainder of the season, over Joey Harrington, the longtime Detroit starter. Garcia struggled later in the season and Harrington returned as the starter. Following the season, the Lions did not offer Garcia a new contract.

=== Philadelphia Eagles (first stint) ===
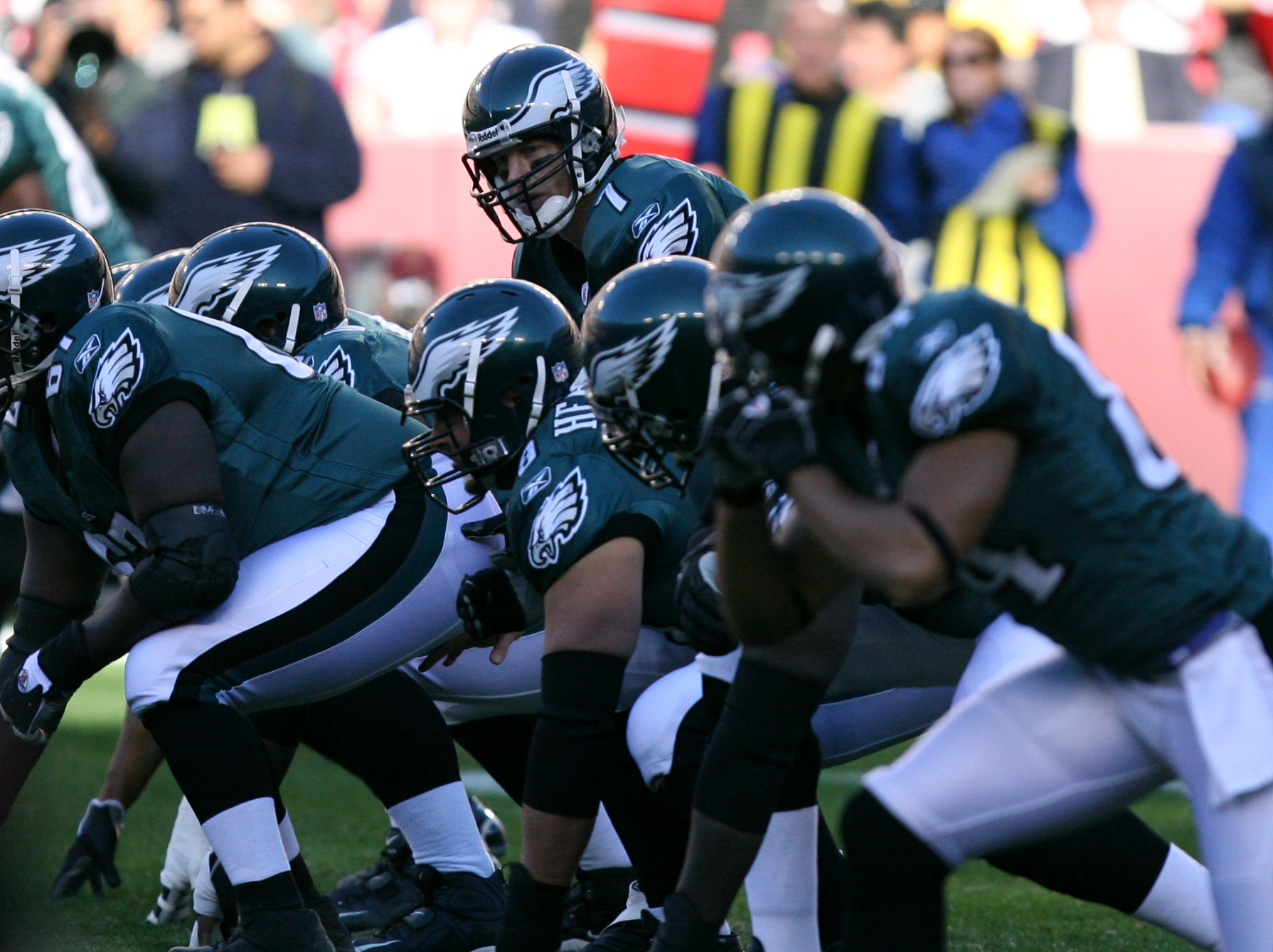
Garcia gets set to take a snap against the Redskins on December 10, 2006.

On March 15, 2006, after consecutive frustrating seasons with the Browns and Lions, Garcia signed a one-year contract with the Philadelphia Eagles to serve as the primary backup to Donovan McNabb in 2006. McNabb had been lost to injury the previous season, and the Eagles went 1–6 without him and missed the playoffs just a year removed from their Super Bowl appearance. Because McNabb was already wearing number 5, Garcia had his jersey number changed to 7, previously worn in Philadelphia by Ron Jaworski.

Following McNabb's season-ending knee injury in a game against the Tennessee Titans on November 19, 2006, Garcia entered the game. Coach Andy Reid named Garcia as the starting quarterback for the remainder of the season over fellow backup A. J. Feeley, despite Feeley's popularity in Philadelphia (Feeley had previously gone 4–1 in 2002 when McNabb was injured). Garcia's first start for the Eagles came against the Colts on Sunday Night Football.

With a 45–21 loss to Indianapolis dropping the Eagles below .500, many sportscasters (namely Jimmy Johnson) predicted the Eagles to be out of contention for the rest of the season. However, Garcia led the Eagles to five consecutive victories and the NFC East division championship. The rejuvenated quarterback threw ten touchdowns and only two interceptions, while posting a QB rating of 95.8 in eight total games played. He also made the front cover of Sports Illustrated following his five-game winning streak. On January 7, 2007, Garcia earned only his second ever playoff win, throwing for 153 yards and one touchdown in a 23–20 victory over the Giants. On January 13, 2007, Garcia and the Eagles lost to the New Orleans Saints by a score of 27–24. He threw for 240 yards, 75 of which came on a touchdown to Donté Stallworth (setting the record for the longest passing touchdown in Eagles' postseason history).

Though he stated that he would love to re-sign with Philadelphia, the Eagles decided not to offer Garcia a new contract after the season. The Eagles opted to instead sign the younger Feeley to a three-year deal, and avoid a potential quarterback controversy between Garcia and McNabb.

=== Tampa Bay Buccaneers ===
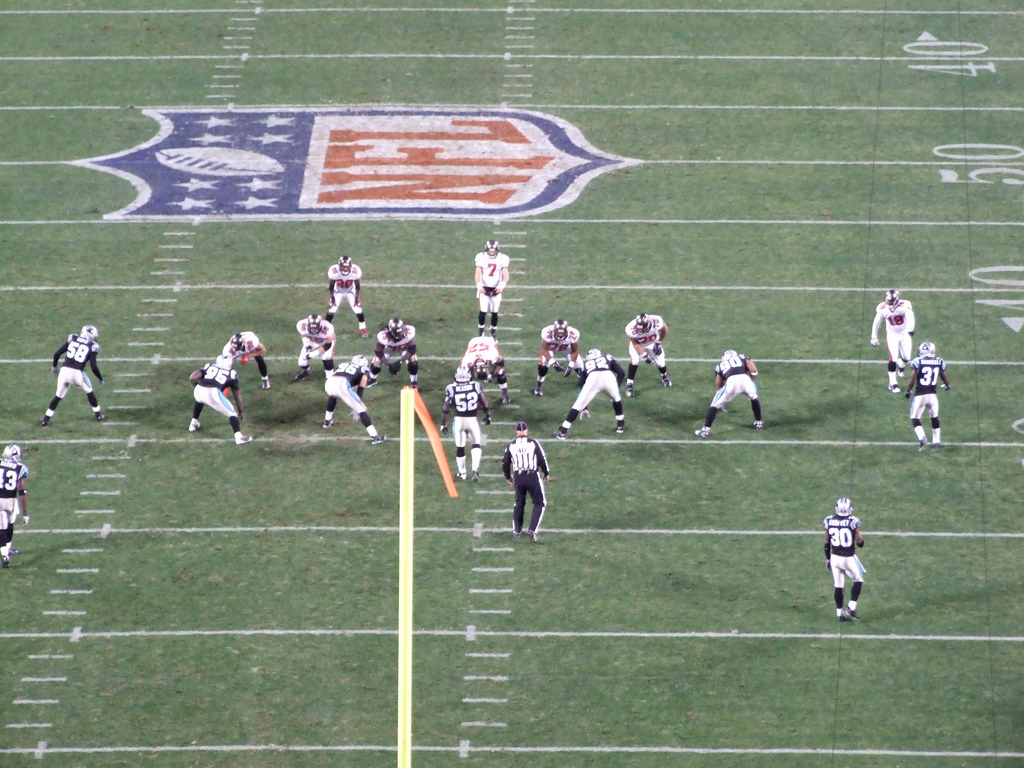
Garcia in the shotgun formation in Tampa Bay

After his run with the Eagles, Garcia signed with the Tampa Bay Buccaneers on March 3, 2007, to compete for their starting position. Although his more familiar number 5 was available, Garcia decided to keep the number 7 he wore with the Eagles. He was named the Buccaneers' starting quarterback for 2007.

Taking over the reins of a Buccaneers team that went 4–12 in 2006, Garcia led them to the NFC South division title. The Buccaneers lost to the eventual Super Bowl champion New York Giants, 24–14, in the Wild Card Round. Garcia would be named to his fourth Pro Bowl that season, his first since 2002. The Buccaneers would not return to the playoffs until the 2020 season.

In the 2008 season opener, Garcia left the game due to injury. Tampa would end up using a "quarterback by committee" rotation between Garcia, Brian Griese, and Luke McCown through the year. During a victory over the Seattle Seahawks, Garcia passed for 310 yards, surpassing 40,000 yards for his career when combining his statistics from both the CFL and NFL, becoming the twentieth player to accomplish the feat. The uncertainty at quarterback led to the Buccaneers losing their final four games in a row, dropping to 9–7 and out of the playoffs. They ultimately decided to move on from Garcia and not re-sign him in the offseason.

=== Oakland Raiders ===
Garcia signed a one-year deal with the Oakland Raiders on April 6, 2009. As he did in Tampa Bay, Bruce Gradkowski changed his number to 5 to allow Garcia to wear number 7. He was expected to back up JaMarcus Russell in the 2009 season, but was released during final cuts on September 5, 2009.

=== Philadelphia Eagles (second stint) ===
After Eagles' quarterback Donovan McNabb suffered a fractured rib in week one, the Eagles signed Garcia to a one-year contract on September 14, 2009. He was released on September 29, following Michael Vick's return from suspension. During this short stint with the Eagles, he wore jersey number 9.

=== Omaha Nighthawks ===
Garcia was one of the signature players of the United Football League and his former team, the Omaha Nighthawks. He won two offensive player of the week awards during the 2010 season, having produced a game-winning drive in two separate games.

=== Houston Texans ===
On December 6, 2011, Garcia signed with the Houston Texans, following an injury to starting quarterback Matt Schaub. Jake Delhomme was also signed by Houston, as both he and Garcia would back up T. J. Yates.

== Career statistics ==
Legend
	Grey Cup MVP
	Won the Grey Cup
	Led the league
	NFL record
**Bold**	Career high

=== CFL ===
Year	Team	Games		Passing									Rushing				
Year	Team	GP	GS	Cmp	Att	Pct	Yds	Y/A	Lng	TD	Int	Rtg	Att	Yds	Y/A	Lng	TD
1994	Calgary	7	0	2	3	**66.7**	10	3.3	9	0	0	81.3	2	3	1.5	2	0
1995	Calgary	18	8	230	364	63.3	3,358	**9.2**	60	25	7	**108.1**	61	396	6.5	25	5
1996	Calgary	18	18	315	537	58.7	4,225	7.9	**104**	25	**16**	86.9	92	657	**7.1**	30	6
1997	Calgary	17	17	**354**	**566**	62.5	**4,573**	8.1	52	**33**	14	97.0	**135**	**727**	5.4	28	**7**
1998	Calgary	18	17	348	554	62.8	4,276	7.7	62	28	15	92.3	94	575	6.1	**46**	6
Career		78	60	1,249	2,024	61.7	16,442	8.1	104	111	52	94.9	384	2,358	6.1	46	24

=== NFL ===
==== Regular season ====
Year	Team	Games			Passing									Rushing					Sacked		Fumbles	
Year	Team	GP	GS	Record	Cmp	Att	Pct	Yds	Y/A	Lng	TD	Int	Rtg	Att	Yds	Y/A	Lng	TD	Sck	SckY	Fum	Lost
1999	SF	13	10	2–8	225	375	60.0	2,544	6.8	62	11	11	77.9	45	231	5.1	25	2	15	104	5	2
2000	SF	16	16	6–10	**355**	**561**	63.3	**4,278**	**7.6**	69	31	10	**97.6**	72	**414**	**5.8**	**33**	4	24	**155**	7	1
2001	SF	16	16	**12–4**	316	504	62.7	3,538	7.0	61	**32**	12	94.8	72	254	3.5	25	5	**26**	114	**9**	3
2002	SF	16	16	10–6	328	528	62.1	3,344	6.3	76	21	10	85.6	**73**	353	4.8	21	3	17	93	2	2
2003	SF	13	13	5–8	225	392	57.4	2,704	6.9	75	18	**13**	80.1	56	319	5.7	21	**7**	21	104	**9**	3
2004	CLE	11	10	3–7	144	252	57.1	1,731	6.9	**99**	10	9	76.7	35	169	4.8	21	2	24	99	**9**	**6**
2005	DET	6	5	1–4	102	173	59.0	937	5.4	49	3	6	65.1	17	51	3.0	14	1	6	34	1	0
2006	PHI	8	6	5–1	116	188	61.7	1,309	7.0	65	10	2	95.8	25	87	3.5	12	0	6	40	6	2
2007	TB	13	13	8–5	209	327	63.9	2,440	7.5	69	13	4	94.6	35	116	3.3	21	1	19	104	4	2
2008	TB	12	11	6–5	244	376	**64.9**	2,712	7.2	71	12	6	90.2	35	148	4.2	20	1	23	100	7	2
2009	PHI	1	0	—	0	0	—	0	—	0	0	0	—	3	−2	−0.7	0	0	0	0	1	1
2011	HOU	Did not play																				
Career		125	116	58–58	2,264	3,676	61.6	25,537	6.9	99	161	83	87.5	468	2,140	4.6	33	26	181	947	60	24

==== Postseason ====
Year	Team	Games			Passing									Rushing					Sacked		Fumbles	
Year	Team	GP	GS	Record	Cmp	Att	Pct	Yds	Y/A	Lng	TD	Int	Rtg	Att	Yds	Y/A	Lng	TD	Sck	SckY	Fum	Lost
2001	SF	1	1	0–1	22	32	**68.8**	233	**7.3**	22	1	1	**87.1**	2	3	1.5	3	0	2	14	1	0
2002	SF	2	2	**1–1**	**49**	**85**	57.6	**524**	6.2	**76**	**3**	**4**	68.0	7	**60**	**8.6**	**14**	**1**	**4**	**27**	**3**	**1**
2006	PHI	2	2	**1–1**	32	61	52.5	393	6.4	75	2	0	83.6	**8**	23	2.9	7	0	3	23	1	0
2007	TB	1	1	0–1	23	39	59.0	207	5.3	26	1	2	60.5	1	2	2.0	2	0	1	5	1	0
2011	HOU	Did not play																				
Career		6	6	2–4	126	217	58.1	1,357	6.3	76	7	7	73.8	18	88	4.9	14	1	10	69	6	1

=== UFL ===
Year	Team	Games		Passing									Rushing				
Year	Team	GP	GS	Cmp	Att	Pct	Yds	Y/A	Lng	TD	Int	Rtg	Att	Yds	Y/A	Lng	TD
2010	Omaha	8	8	132	255	51.8	1,321	5.2	48	9	11	60.6	24	68	2.8	14	0
Career		8	8	132	255	51.8	1,321	5.2	48	9	11	60.6	24	68	2.8	14	0

== Post-playing career ==
Garcia joined the advisory board of the revival of the United States Football League (USFL) in May 2012. In August 2014 Garcia was hired as an offensive consultant by the Montreal Alouettes of the CFL. Just days later he was named the Alouettes' quarterbacks coach. In May 2015, the St. Louis Rams hired Garcia as an offensive assistant which lasted for one season. Garcia has shown interest in developing the skills and mechanics in other quarterbacks, as he has worked with Matt McGloin, Mark Sanchez, and Tyrod Taylor. Garcia has also expressed his interest in developing Colin Kaepernick's mechanics and skills as well.

From December 2024 to November 2025, Garcia was the offensive coordinator for Mira Mesa Senior High School in San Diego, California. He has since left to coach elsewhere.

== Personal life ==
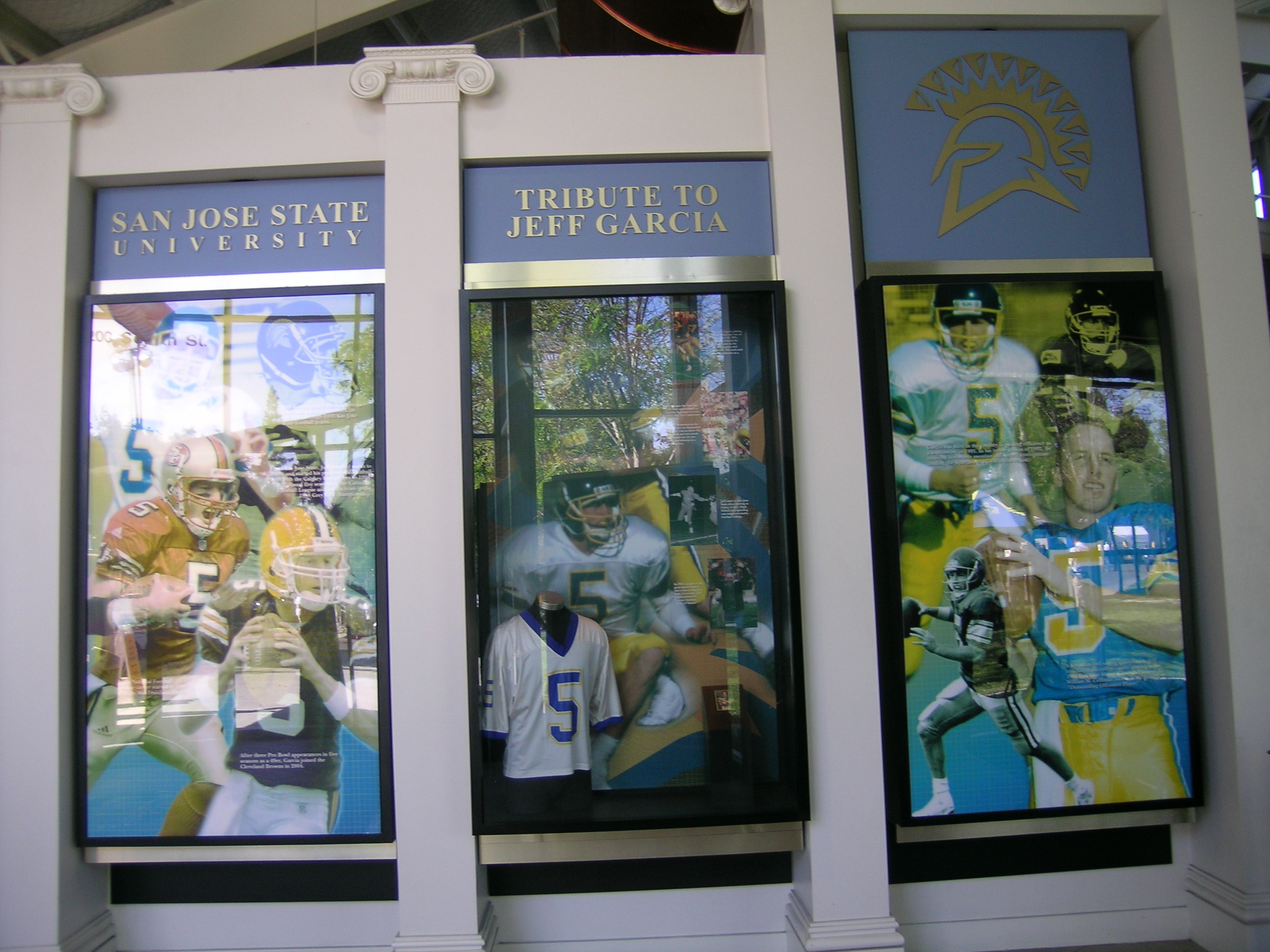
The tribute to Garcia at San Jose State University's football center

Garcia is the third of seven children born to Bob and Linda (née Elder) Garcia. His father is a former athletic director and football coach at Gavilan College in his hometown of Gilroy, California. A pair of twin girls died before Garcia's birth. His younger brother Jason drowned on a family camping trip in 1977 when Garcia was seven, and fourteen months later his younger sister Kimberly died after falling out of a truck. His two surviving sisters, Jene and Melissa, were born after the deaths of Jason and Kimberly. Garcia has said that much of his drive stems from trying to make his parents happy after the deaths of his siblings.

His maternal grandfather, Maurice "Red" Elder, was a football star at Kansas State University in the 1930s; both played in the East–West Shrine Game while in college, the only grandfather-grandson duo to do so. Elder was a longtime coach at Gilroy High School. Garcia donated money to refurbish the athletic field at the school, and in 2005, the field was renamed Garcia-Elder Field to honor both of them.

Garcia, who is of Mexican, German, and Irish heritage, has also done various charitable work in support of the Hispanic Scholarship Fund.

On April 21, 2007, Garcia married Carmella DeCesare, an American model who was Playboy magazine's Miss April 2003 and Playmate of the Year for 2004 at the CordeValle Resort in San Martin, California. They have four children. In a Christmas Day 2020 reply to a post on his Instagram account, Garcia stated that he and DeCesare were no longer together (without commenting on the legal status of their marriage), saying, "things happen but we are still great friends and co parent our beautiful 4 kids together. All is good man."

Garcia and DeCesare founded the Garcia Pass It On Foundation in order to share resources with people in less fortunate circumstances. The Foundation is closed.

== See also ==
- List of gridiron football quarterbacks passing statistics
