= Tim Rattay =

American football player and coach (born 1977)

South Alabama Jaguars
- Title: Passing game coordinator & receivers coach

Personal information
- Born: March 15, 1977 (age 49); Elyria, Ohio, U.S.
- Listed height: 6 ft 0 in (1.83 m)
- Listed weight: 200 lb (91 kg)

Career information
- Position: Quarterback (No. 13, 12)
- High school: Phoenix Christian (Phoenix, Arizona)
- College: Scottsdale CC (1995); Louisiana Tech (1996–1999)
- NFL draft: 2000: 7th round, 212th overall pick

Career history

Playing
- San Francisco 49ers (2000–2005); Tampa Bay Buccaneers (2005–2006); Tennessee Titans (2007)*; Arizona Cardinals (2007); Las Vegas Locomotives (2009–2010)
- * Offseason or practice squad member only

Coaching
- Las Vegas Locomotives (2011–2012) Wide receivers coach; Louisiana Tech (2013–2015) Wide receivers coach; Louisiana Tech (2016–2018) Quarterbacks coach; Washington Redskins (2019) Quarterbacks coach; Oklahoma State (2020–2024) Quarterbacks coach; LSU (2025) Offensive analyst; South Alabama (2026–present) Passing game coordinator & receivers coach

Awards and highlights
- 2× UFL champion (2009, 2010); 2× NCAA passing yards leader (1998, 1999)

Career NFL statistics
- Passing attempts: 714
- Passing completions: 432
- Completion percentage: 60.5%
- TD–INT: 31–23
- Passing yards: 4,853
- Passer rating: 81.9
- Stats at Pro Football Reference

Timothy F. Rattay (/rəˈteɪ/; born March 15, 1977) is an American football coach and former player who is the passing game coordinator and receivers coach for the South Alabama Jaguars. Prior to becoming a coach, Rattay played as a quarterback in the National Football League (NFL) and United Football League (UFL). He played college football for the Louisiana Tech Bulldogs, and was selected by the San Francisco 49ers in the seventh round of the 2000 NFL draft.

Rattay was also a member of the Tampa Bay Buccaneers, Tennessee Titans, Arizona Cardinals, and Las Vegas Locomotives.

== Early life ==
Rattay's high school career began at Mesa High School in Mesa, Arizona. He did not take snaps as a sophomore or junior at Mesa High before transferring to Phoenix Christian when his father, Jim, became an assistant.

Because he was a backup, Rattay did not play until his senior year at Phoenix Christian, where he set a school record with 40 touchdown passes in 1994.

== College career ==
=== Scottsdale CC ===
Rattay was not scouted by a major college, so he played a year at Scottsdale Community College, where he beat out five quarterbacks ahead of him on the depth chart to earn the starting spot the week of the season opener. He led the nation's junior-college quarterbacks in touchdown passes (28) and yardage (3,526).

=== Louisiana Tech ===
Tim Rattay then transferred to Louisiana Tech, in Ruston. There he set several NCAA records, finishing his career with the NCAA Division I-A records for average passing yards per game, 386.2, and total offensive yards, 12,643. He was in the top 10 voting for the Heisman in 1998, which is awarded to the most outstanding college football player. In 1998, he broke school records as a senior with 4,943 yards and 46 touchdowns to finish with what was, at the time, third in NCAA history in single-season yardage. His 1998 season is, as of 2020, 19th all-time. He finished his college career #2 all-time in passing TDs.

Rattay was inducted into the Louisiana Tech Athletic Hall of Fame in 2007.

== Professional career ==
Pre-draft measurables
Height	Weight	Arm length	Hand span	40-yard dash	10-yard split	20-yard split	20-yard shuttle	Three-cone drill	Vertical jump	Broad jump	Wonderlic
6 ft 0 1/2 in (1.84 m)	215 lb (98 kg)	31 1/2 in (0.80 m)	9 in (0.23 m)	4.89 s	1.63 s	2.79 s	4.21 s	7.34 s	25.5 in (0.65 m)	8 ft 4 in (2.54 m)	27
All values from NFL Combine

=== San Francisco 49ers ===
Tim Rattay entered the league as the seventh-round pick (212th overall) of the San Francisco 49ers in the 2000 NFL draft. Rattay outperformed fellow rookie Giovanni Carmazzi, who'd been taken in the third round (65th overall, 147 spots ahead of Rattay), to earn a roster spot as a backup to starting quarterback Jeff Garcia. Starting in place of an injured Garcia, Rattay won 2 of 3 games in 2003, throwing 7 touchdowns and just 2 interceptions, before getting injured. When Garcia was released from the team in March 2004, largely due to salary cap constraints, Rattay was given the starting job. From 2004 to 2005 he went 2–11 playing for the 49ers.

=== Tampa Bay Buccaneers ===
On October 18, 2005, Rattay was acquired by the Tampa Bay Buccaneers for a 6th-round 2006 NFL draft pick from the San Francisco 49ers.

Late in the 2006 season, Rattay stepped in as the starting quarterback for the Buccaneers due to the poor play of Bruce Gradkowski. In the week 15 game against the Chicago Bears, he entered the game with Tampa Bay losing 14–3. Due to his strong performance, Tampa Bay tied the game at 31, but they eventually lost in overtime 34–31. This performance led head coach Jon Gruden to name Rattay as the team's third different starting quarterback in the 2006 season.

=== Tennessee Titans ===
On May 9, 2007, Rattay signed as a free agent with the Tennessee Titans. The following month Gruden would name Jeff Garcia Rattay's successor as the Buccaneers' starting quarterback. Rattay signed with Tennessee to be a backup before 2007's training camp. He made the team's 53 man roster, but was cut the next day.

=== Arizona Cardinals ===
On October 9, 2007, Rattay signed a one-year contract with the Arizona Cardinals as a backup to Kurt Warner, following a season-ending collarbone injury to starting quarterback Matt Leinart. Rattay would replace Warner in goal-line situations, where he went 3 for 3 with all 3 being touchdowns. Rattay declined to sign for another year, and decided to test the free agent market.

In September 2008, there were rumors that the New England Patriots considered signing Rattay after Tom Brady was lost for the entire 2008 season. In the 2000 NFL draft, the Patriots considered drafting Rattay but opted for Brady instead. The Patriots brought Rattay to Foxboro along with Chris Simms, but once they arrived, they were told that, since Matt Cassel had emerged, the situation had changed and Simms and Rattay were no longer needed in New England.

A month later, Rattay worked out with the Detroit Lions, but they never made an offer to him.

=== Las Vegas Locomotives ===
In July 2009, Rattay signed with the Las Vegas Locomotives of the United Football League. Head coach Jim Fassel said that Rattay would serve as the backup to J. P. Losman. On November 21, Rattay started for an injured Losman and led the Locomotives with two touchdown passes in a blowout win against the New York Sentinels.

On July 12, 2010, Rattay announced his retirement from professional football.

== Career statistics ==
=== NFL ===
Legend
**Bold**	Career high

Year	Team	Games			Passing									Rushing					Sacks	
Year	Team	GP	GS	Record	Cmp	Att	Pct	Yds	Y/A	Lng	TD	Int	Rtg	Att	Yds	Avg	Lng	TD	Sck	Yds
2000	SFO	1	0	-	1	1	**100.0**	-4	-4.0	-4	0	0	79.2	2	-1	-0.5	0	0	0	0
2001	SFO	3	0	-	2	2	**100.0**	21	**10.5**	20	0	0	**110.4**	5	-3	-0.6	1	0	0	0
2002	SFO	4	0	-	26	43	60.5	232	5.4	27	2	0	90.5	5	0	0.0	5	0	5	26
2003	SFO	**11**	3	**2-1**	73	118	61.9	856	7.3	61	7	2	96.6	3	8	0.0	6	0	7	54
2004	SFO	9	**9**	1-8	**198**	**325**	60.9	**2,169**	6.7	65	**10**	**10**	78.1	**12**	**55**	**4.6**	**15**	0	**37**	**211**
2005	SFO	4	4	1-3	56	97	57.7	667	6.9	**89**	5	6	70.3	7	18	2.6	13	0	10	63
2006	TAM	4	2	1-1	61	101	60.4	748	7.4	64	4	2	88.2	4	3	0.8	4	0	4	18
2007	ARI	4	0	-	15	27	55.6	164	6.1	42	3	3	71.1	2	5	2.5	5	0	0	0
Career		40	18	5-13	432	714	60.5	4,853	6.8	89	31	23	81.9	45	77	1.7	15	0	63	372

=== College ===
Year	Team	GP	Passing						
Year	Team	GP	Cmp	Att	Pct	Yds	TD	Int	Rtg
1997	Louisiana Tech	11	293	477	61.4	3,881	34	10	149.1
1998	Louisiana Tech	12	380	559	68.0	4,943	46	13	164.8
1999	Louisiana Tech	10	342	516	66.3	3,922	35	12	147.9
Totals		33	1,015	1,552	65.4	12,746	115	35	154.3

== Career achievements ==
- 2× UFL champion (2009, 2010)
- 2× NCAA passing yards leader (1998, 1999)
- Rattay is one of only three 7th-round or undrafted quarterback since 1995 (out of a pool of 30 such players) to pass for more than 400 yards in a game. Matt Cassel accomplished this twice in 2008, and Tony Romo in 2010.
- Rattay broke the San Francisco 49ers team record for the most completions in a 31–28 win against the Arizona Cardinals on October 10, 2004, when he completed 38 passes, breaking Joe Montana's record of 37.
- Rattay is the only quarterback in NFL history to throw three consecutive passes all going for touchdowns, as he did for the Arizona Cardinals in 2007. Each touchdown occurred in three non-consecutive games, and each pass was his only pass attempt of the game.
- Rattay was responsible for the biggest comeback in Buccaneers history on December 17, 2006, when he led the team back from a 21-point 3rd quarter deficit against the eventual NFC Champion Chicago Bears, throwing for three touchdowns in the fourth quarter and sending the game into overtime before the Buccaneers lost, 34–31.

== Coaching career ==
=== Las Vegas Locomotives ===
Following his retirement, Rattay joined the Locomotives coaching staff as wide receivers coach on July 18, 2011.

=== Louisiana Tech ===
Skip Holtz hired Rattay to be the Louisiana Tech wide receivers coach prior to the 2013 football season. After three seasons in this role, Rattay became the quarterbacks coach for Louisiana Tech, a role in which he served from the 2016 - 2018 seasons.

=== Washington Redskins ===
On February 8, 2019, Rattay joined the Washington Redskins staff as a quarterbacks coach.

=== Oklahoma State Cowboys ===
Rattay joined the Oklahoma State Cowboys football team as their quarterbacks coach on January 10, 2020.

=== LSU ===
On February 3, 2025, Rattay joined the LSU Tigers football team as an offensive analyst.

=== South Alabama ===
On March 4, 2026, Rattay joined the South Alabama Jaguars football team as their passing game coordinator and receivers coach.

== See also ==
- List of NFL Quarterbacks who have passed for 400 or more yards in a game
- List of NCAA Division I FBS quarterbacks with at least 10,000 career passing yards
- List of NCAA Division I FBS quarterbacks with at least 80 career passing touchdowns
- List of NCAA major college football yearly passing leaders
- List of NCAA major college football yearly total offense leaders
