= Fred Beasley =

American football player (born 1974)

Frederick Jerome Beasley
No. 40
- Position: Fullback

Personal information
- Born: September 18, 1974 (age 52); Montgomery, Alabama, U.S.
- Listed height: 6 ft 0 in (1.83 m)
- Listed weight: 246 lb (112 kg)

Career information
- High school: Lee (Montgomery)
- College: Auburn
- NFL draft: 1998: 6th round, 180th overall pick

Career history
- San Francisco 49ers (1998–2005); Miami Dolphins (2006)*; Washington Redskins (2007)*
- * Offseason or practice squad member only

Awards and highlights
- 2× Second-team All-Pro (2002, 2003); Pro Bowl (2003)

Career NFL statistics
- Rushing yards: 610
- Rushing average: 3.3
- Receptions: 133
- Receiving yards: 1,017
- Total touchdowns: 13
- Stats at Pro Football Reference

Frederick Jerome Beasley, whose name was shortened to "Fred", (born September 18, 1974) is an American former professional football player who was a fullback in the National Football League (NFL). He played college football for the Auburn Tigers and was selected by the San Francisco 49ers in the sixth round of the 1998 NFL draft.

== High school years ==
Beasley attended Robert E. Lee High School in Montgomery, Alabama and earned letters in football and track. In football, he was a two-time All-State honoree, won back-to-back state championships and as a senior, he was a USA Today All-USA selection and named an All-American by Parade. In track, he was a three-time State Champion on the decathlon. His head coach was Legendary Hall of Famer Spence McCracken. His Home Economics teacher went out on maternity leave, so his full-time substitute was future State Champion basketball Coach Scott C. Davis.

== College career ==
Beasley attended Auburn University, and was a star in football. He split time between fullback and tailback and finished his career with 1,241 rushing yards, 567 receiving yards, and 16 rushing touchdowns. In a 1997 game against the Georgia Bulldogs, a match widely considered the "Deep South's Oldest Rivalry," Beasley plowed over current Georgia Bulldogs head coach, Kirby Smart, who was attempting to tackle him.

== Professional career ==
Beasley was selected by the San Francisco 49ers in the sixth round of the 1998 NFL draft with the 180th overall pick, and spent the next eight seasons with the franchise. At one time, Beasley was widely regarded as the best blocking fullback in the NFL. In 2002 and 2003, he was selected as an All-Pro at fullback. In 2003, he was named the NFC Pro Bowl team's starting fullback. Following his release from San Francisco following the 2005 season, he signed with the Miami Dolphins but was released early in the 2006 season. The following year, Beasley signed with the Washington Redskins to a one-year contract. He was released on September 1, 2007.

=== NFL statistics ===
Rushing Stats

Year	Team	Games	Carries	Yards	Yards per carry	Longest carry	Touchdowns	First downs	Fumbles	Fumbles lost
1999	SF	13	58	276	4.8	44	4	18	2	2
2000	SF	15	50	147	2.9	9	3	14	0	0
2001	SF	15	23	73	3.2	16	1	8	0	0
2002	SF	16	26	75	2.9	9	0	15	0	0
2003	SF	16	17	24	1.4	5	0	4	0	0
2004	SF	14	9	15	1.7	4	0	4	0	0
Career		114	183	610	3.3	44	8	63	2	2

Receiving Stats

Year	Team	Games	Receptions	Yards	Yards per Reception	Longest Reception	Touchdowns	First Downs	Fumbles	Fumbles Lost
1998	SF	16	1	11	11.0	11	0	1	0	0
1999	SF	13	32	282	8.8	24	0	16	0	0
2000	SF	15	31	233	7.5	34	3	11	0	0
2001	SF	15	16	99	6.2	15	0	6	1	1
2002	SF	16	22	152	6.9	25	1	8	0	0
2003	SF	16	19	184	9.7	32	1	6	0	0
2004	SF	14	10	44	4.4	9	0	1	0	0
2005	SF	9	2	12	6.0	6	0	0	0	0
Career		114	133	1,017	7.6	34	5	49	1	1
