= Ahmed Plummer =

American football player (born 1976)

No. 29
- Position: Cornerback

Personal information
- Born: March 26, 1976 (age 50); Wyoming, Ohio, U.S.
- Listed height: 6 ft 0 in (1.83 m)
- Listed weight: 191 lb (87 kg)

Career information
- High school: Wyoming (OH)
- College: Ohio State
- NFL draft: 2000: 1st round, 24th overall pick

Career history
- San Francisco 49ers (2000–2005)

Awards and highlights
- First-team All-Big Ten (1999); Second-team All-Big Ten (1998)

Career NFL statistics
- Total tackles: 317
- Fumble recoveries: 1
- Pass deflections: 71
- Interceptions: 12
- Defensive touchdowns: 1
- Stats at Pro Football Reference

Ahmed Kamil Plummer (born March 26, 1976) is an American former professional football player who was a cornerback for six seasons with the San Francisco 49ers of the National Football League (NFL) from 2000 to 2005. Standing 5'11" and 191 lb. from Ohio State University, Plummer was selected by the 49ers in the first round (24th overall) in the 2000 NFL draft. After only playing in 9 of the last 32 games due to injuries and missing significant parts of both 2004 and 2005 seasons, he announced his retirement from the NFL on June 16, 2006.

Plummer is the cousin of former NBA player, Brian Grant.

== NFL career statistics ==
Legend
**Bold**	Career high

=== Regular season ===
Year	Team	Games		Tackles					Interceptions					Fumbles			
Year	Team	GP	GS	Cmb	Solo	Ast	Sck	TFL	Int	Yds	TD	Lng	PD	FF	FR	Yds	TD
2000	SFO	**16**	14	**75**	**66**	9	0.0	0	0	0	0	0	8	0	0	0	0
2001	SFO	15	**15**	64	58	6	0.0	**2**	**7**	45	0	24	**18**	0	**1**	0	0
2002	SFO	15	**15**	63	52	**11**	0.0	1	1	0	0	0	**18**	0	0	0	0
2003	SFO	15	**15**	69	61	8	0.0	0	4	**85**	**1**	**68**	16	0	0	0	0
2004	SFO	6	6	22	15	7	0.0	0	0	0	0	0	7	0	0	0	0
2005	SFO	3	3	24	17	7	0.0	0	0	0	0	0	4	0	0	0	0
		70	68	317	269	48	0.0	3	12	130	1	68	71	0	1	0	0

=== Playoffs ===
Year	Team	Games		Tackles					Interceptions					Fumbles			
Year	Team	GP	GS	Cmb	Solo	Ast	Sck	TFL	Int	Yds	TD	Lng	PD	FF	FR	Yds	TD
2001	SFO	1	1	4	2	**2**	0.0	0	**1**	**4**	0	**4**	**1**	0	0	0	0
2002	SFO	**2**	**2**	**8**	**7**	1	0.0	0	0	0	0	0	**1**	0	0	0	0
		3	3	12	9	3	0.0	0	1	4	0	4	2	0	0	0	0
