= John Engelberger =

American football player (born 1976)

No. 95, 60
- Position: Defensive end

Personal information
- Born: October 18, 1976 (age 50); Heidelberg, Germany
- Listed height: 6 ft 4 in (1.93 m)
- Listed weight: 252 lb (114 kg)

Career information
- High school: Lee (Springfield, Virginia, U.S.)
- College: Virginia Tech (1995–1999)
- NFL draft: 2000: 2nd round, 35th overall pick

Career history
- San Francisco 49ers (2000–2004); Denver Broncos (2005–2008)

Awards and highlights
- Second-team All-American (1999); First-team All-Big East (1999); 2× Second-team All-Big East (1997–1998)

Career NFL statistics
- Total tackles: 274
- Sacks: 20.5
- Forced fumbles: 14
- Fumble recoveries: 4
- Pass deflections: 20
- Stats at Pro Football Reference

Johnathan Alberto Engelberger (born October 18, 1976) is an American former professional football player who was a defensive end in the National Football League (NFL). He played college football for the Virginia Tech Hokies and was selected by the San Francisco 49ers in the second round of the 2000 NFL draft. Engelberger also played for the Denver Broncos. Also notable, Uncle to Logan Engelberger.

== Early life ==
Engelberger was born to an American military family. Engelberger lettered in football for two years at Robert E. Lee High School in Springfield, Virginia, where he played tight end and linebacker. He caught 19 passes for 422 yards with four touchdowns while adding 263 tackles and three sacks as a linebacker as a senior.

== College career ==
Engelberger was a Second-team All-American and a First-team All-Big East Conference choice following a senior season at Virginia Tech that saw him record 53 tackles (32 solo) and seven sacks. During his four years at Virginia Tech, the Hokies played in four bowl games, including an appearance in the National Championship Game. At the conclusion of his senior season, he was awarded the Paul Torgersen Award as the Hokie player who shows a commitment to hard work and great effort every time he takes the field. As a junior, he recorded 66 tackles and 7.5 sacks to garner a Second-team All-Big East selection. He was named the team's outstanding defensive lineman after his junior campaign. He finished his sophomore season with 70 tackles (43 solo) and six sacks en route to a Second-team All-Big East selection. As a freshman, he contributed 64 tackles (33 solo) and six sacks. Engelberger started his collegiate career as a walk-on at Virginia Tech. His contributions in Blacksburg earned him a spot in the Virginia Tech Sports Hall of Fame.

== Professional career ==
=== Pre-draft ===
A 6-4¼, 260-pound defensive end, Engelberger ran a 4.65 40-yard dash, had a 34" vertical leap and had a three-cone drill time of 6.95 seconds.

=== San Francisco 49ers ===
Selected by San Francisco in the second round (35th overall) of the 2000 NFL draft, Engelberger played all 16 regular-season games (13 starts) as a rookie. He recorded 28 tackles (20 solo), three sacks and a forced fumble. In 2001, Engelberger played 15 regular-season games (14 starts) and set his career high with four forced fumbles. He also added 36 tackles (32 solo) and four sacks to a defense that placed among the NFL's top 10 against the run. The next season, 2002, Engelberger played 15 regular-season games (0 starts) and both postseason contests for San Francisco, compiling 12 tackles (11 solo) and one special-teams stop. In 2003, he started all 16 regular-season games for San Francisco at defensive end, recording 35 tackles (25 solo) while setting a then career high with 4.5 sacks. In 2004 Engelberger played 16 regular-season games (15 starts) at left defensive end for San Francisco, recording career highs in tackles (64) and sacks while matching his personal best with four forced fumbles.

=== Denver Broncos ===
Engelberger was acquired by the Broncos in a trade with San Francisco in exchange for cornerback Willie Middlebrooks on July 15, 2005. In his first season with the Broncos, Engelberger played 14 regular-season games (0 starts) and contributed 24 tackles (17 solo) as a part of the NFL's second-best run defense (85.2 ypg). In 2006, he had 55 tackles, including a career-high 37 solo stops, one sack, four passes defended, two forced fumbles and a fumble recovery. In 2007, Engelberger led the Broncos’ defensive line with 59 tackles (40 solo), starting 15 of 16 games played and one sack, two pass breakups and one forced fumble. He earned the team's nomination for the Ed Block Courage Award by starting its final 12 games despite suffering a fifth-degree separation of the AC joint in his right shoulder in Week 4. Engelberger started the first six games of the season for the Broncos in 2008. He finished second on the team among defensive linemen with 51 tackles.

On February 16, 2009, the Broncos released Engelberger.

=== NFL statistics ===
Year	Team	Games	Combined tackles	Tackles	Assisted tackles	Sacks	Forced fumbles	Fumble recoveries	Fumble return yards	Interceptions	Interception return yards	Yards per interception return	Longest interception return	Interceptions returned for touchdown	Passes defended
2000	SF	16	30	21	9	3.0	1	0	0	0	0	0	0	0	4
2001	SF	15	30	29	1	4.0	4	0	0	0	0	0	0	0	5
2002	SF	15	11	10	1	0.0	0	0	0	0	0	0	0	0	0
2003	SF	16	29	26	3	4.5	1	2	0	0	0	0	0	0	1
2004	SF	16	44	24	20	6.0	4	1	0	0	0	0	0	0	4
2005	DEN	14	16	13	3	0.0	0	0	0	0	0	0	0	0	0
2006	DEN	16	31	24	7	1.0	2	1	0	0	0	0	0	0	3
2007	DEN	16	41	30	11	1.0	1	0	0	0	0	0	0	0	1
2008	DEN	15	31	24	7	1.0	1	0	0	0	0	0	0	0	0
Career		139	263	201	62	20.5	14	4	0	0	0	0	0	0	18
