= Jason Webster =

American football player (born 1977)

No. 36, 27, 21, 23
- Position: Cornerback

Personal information
- Born: September 8, 1977 (age 49); Houston, Texas, U.S.
- Listed height: 5 ft 9 in (1.75 m)
- Listed weight: 187 lb (85 kg)

Career information
- High school: Willowridge (Houston)
- College: Texas A&M
- NFL draft: 2000: 2nd round, 48th overall pick

Career history
- San Francisco 49ers (2000–2003); Atlanta Falcons (2004–2006); Buffalo Bills (2007); New England Patriots (2008)

Awards and highlights
- First-team All-Big 12 (1999); Second-team All-Big 12 (1998)

Career NFL statistics
- Total tackles: 402
- Forced fumbles: 7
- Fumble recoveries: 1
- Pass deflections: 55
- Interceptions: 11
- Defensive touchdowns: 2
- Stats at Pro Football Reference

Jason Richmond Webster (born September 8, 1977) is an American former professional football player who was a cornerback in the National Football League (NFL). He played college football for the Texas A&M Aggies and was selected by the San Francisco 49ers in the second round of the 2000 NFL draft.

Webster was also a member of the Atlanta Falcons, Buffalo Bills and New England Patriots.

== Early life ==
Webster attended Willowridge High School in Missouri City, Texas, where he earned All-American honors in football. He also lettered four times in track.

== College career ==
Made an immediate impact playing in every game with one start as a true freshman, recording 32 tackles and one interception. Started 12 games at cornerback as sophomore and finished with 61 tackles, one fumble recovery and a team-high nine passes deflected. Started all 12 games and recorded 72 tackles, two interceptions, and seven passes deflected as a junior. Was the anchor of the "Wrecking Crew" defense, as he played a team-best 640 defensive snaps as a senior.

He was also voted by his teammates as the winner of the Aggie Heart Award. The Aggie Heart Award is presented to a senior who has completed his eligibility and displayed intangibles such as effort, desire, determination, competitiveness, leadership and courage. The Heart Award is voted on by the entire Aggie football team. He was chosen as the team spokesman the Aggie Bonfire tragedy.

After his senior year, Webster was also selected as Texas A&M defensive MVP, was an All-Big 12 selection, and was named an All-American by the All-America Football Foundation. That year, Webster made 74 tackles and four interceptions and broke up a team-leading 10 passes. He was named the Sportsmanship Award winner at the 1999 Alamo Bowl.

== Professional career ==
=== San Francisco 49ers ===
Webster was the highest Aggie drafted in the 2000 NFL draft as he was selected in the second round (48th overall) by the San Francisco 49ers. Played in all 16 games with 10 starts as a rookie in 2000, finishing the season with 44 tackles and two interceptions. Made his first start against the St. Louis Rams in place of the injured Monty Montgomery and also started the final nine games of the season. Became the first 49ers rookie since Tim McKyer to return an interception for a touchdown

Started all 16 games of the 2001 season and finished the season with 75 tackles, eight passes defensed, one forced fumble and three interceptions. Started and recorded five solo tackles at Green Bay in the NFC Wild Card Game.

Also Started all 16 games in 2002, finishing third on the team with a career-high 86 tackles in addition to 10 passes defensed and one interception returned for a touchdown. Was inactive in both playoff games with an ankle injury sustained in the season finale, beginning an unfortunate streak of injuries that would derail a promising NFL career. Was inactive for the first nine games of the season due to a knee injury suffered in training camp, and started in only two of the five games he played in 2003 and ending a streak of 41 consecutive starts.

=== Atlanta Falcons ===
In spite of his recent history of injuries, he was signed by the Atlanta Falcons to a six-year contract. He played in 10 games in 2004 with nine starts and had 40 tackles, one interception and a team-leading 10 passes defensed. Injury hit again, as he had to leave a November 28 game against New Orleans early with a groin injury. He did come back to play as a reserve against St. Louis in the NFC Divisional Playoff Game and started in the NFC Championship Game at Philadelphia.

2005 was his best season for the Falcons, as he started 13 of 15 games he played and led the secondary with a career-high 91 tackles in addition to recording five passes defensed, two forced fumbles and one interception. In his final season with the Falcons in 2006, Webster played the first eight games, holding off a challenge from Jimmy Williams for the starting job, but then tore a groin muscle in practice. He missed the final eight games, and the Falcons slumped to 7–9 to miss the playoffs for the second year in a row. Webster played only 33 games, including 29 starts, during his three-year tenure in Atlanta.

=== Buffalo Bills ===
Prior to the 2007 season, the Buffalo Bills signed Webster to a one-year deal in an attempt to fill the shoes of Nate Clements, who was lost to free agency. Buffalo was hoping that Webster could overcome his injury-plagued past and bring veteran leadership to their secondary, but in the first week of the NFL season against the Denver Broncos, Webster broke his arm in the third quarter and was out for the remainder of the season.

=== New England Patriots ===
On March 4, 2008, Webster was signed by the New England Patriots. He was released on August 26 during the preseason. He was re-signed again on November 5, due to the injury of Terrence Wheatley that downgraded the team's cornerback position.

Webster played three games in the 2008 season, compiling 5 tackles (3 solo) and a fumble recovery. He was placed on injured reserve on December 2, 2008. He was released with an injury settlement the following day.

=== NFL statistics ===
Year	Team	Games	Combined tackles	Tackles	Assisted tackles	Sacks	Forced fumbles	Fumble recoveries	Fumble return yards	Interceptions	Interception return yards	Yards per interception return	Longest interception return	Interceptions returned for touchdown	Passes defended
2000	SF	16	55	40	15	0.0	1	1	0	2	78	39	70	1	11
2001	SF	16	75	67	8	0.5	1	0	0	3	61	20	31	0	10
2002	SF	16	85	71	14	0.0	0	0	0	1	37	37	37	1	10
2003	SF	5	10	7	3	0.0	0	0	0	1	17	17	17	0	3
2004	ATL	10	40	38	2	0.0	1	0	0	1	18	18	18	0	10
2005	ATL	15	79	73	6	0.0	2	0	0	1	19	19	19	0	5
2006	ATL	8	50	40	10	0.0	1	0	0	2	-2	-1	3	0	5
2007	BUF	1	3	2	1	0.0	0	0	0	0	0	0	0	0	1
2008	NE	3	5	3	2	0.0	1	0	0	0	0	0	0	0	0
Career		90	402	341	61	0.5	7	1	0	11	228	21	70	2	55
