= Dwight Carter =

American photographer

- Born: August 14, 1943; Birmingham, Alabama
- Known for: Photography
- Website: dwightcarter.com

Dwight Carter is an American photographer known for his portraits and commercial photography.

Dwight Carter was born in Birmingham, Alabama on August 14, 1943. He attended Los Angeles City College and the ArtCenter College of Design.

After graduation in 1967, Carter worked as an assistant to several photographers including Hiro, and Bert Stern, and Richard Avedon. In 1969 Carter enlisted in the U.S. Army during the Vietnam War, serving as combat photographer. When he returned in 1970 he settled in New York and eventually set up his own studio in 1973.

Carter's work was included in the 2025 exhibition Photography and the Black Arts Movement, 1955–1985 at the National Gallery of Art. Also in 2025 his Vietnam works were exhibited at the Newark Public Library in a show entitled Adjusting The FOCUS: The Vietnam War Through the Lens of Black Combat Photographer Dwight Carter.
