= Peter L. Harris =

American retailer (born 1943)

Peter L. Harris (born December 17, 1943) is an American retailer and retail consultant.

== Career ==
Harris attended Whittier College, where he played center on the football team, and was a catcher for the baseball team. He went on to play AAA baseball.

He began his career in the Central Valley of California stocking shelves at Gemco. He became the chief executive officer of the company 13 years later. Under his leadership, Gemco achieved $2.2 billion in sales, its highest level at the time. He became a member of the Young Presidents' Organization.

In 1985 as CEO Harris and an investor partner acquired world-famous FAO Schwarz. The company had lost some of its market share to toy discounters and stores with more modern offerings. Harris brought in exclusive product line agreements and newer toys to supplement traditional sales, and relocated the flagship Manhattan store.

While at the company he invented the concept of "entertainment retail", a strategy that the customer should have an experience while in the store, a personal interaction between consumer and retailer. Harris sold the company to Dutch retail group KKB in 1990 and remained as CEO.

He later moved to video game company Accolade and then Picture People until it was sold to Hallmark Cards. Harris employed the entertainment retail strategy there, where photographers would wear spin hats and children could play with a giant camera.

In July 2000, John York, the new owner-representative of the San Francisco 49ers, hired Harris to replace Carmen Policy as president and chief executive officer. Harris stayed for four years but did not renew his contract. During his time with the team, he oversaw the building a new stadium.

In 2004 Harris was named the CEO of NASDAQ-listed boating lifestyle company West Marine in Watsonville, California, with more than 400 stores and 4,000 employees. He resigned in December 2007.

In recent years Harris took on a full-time advisory and operating role as a Senior Managing Partner at crisis management firm Eaglepoint Advisors, before joining private equity firm TPG Growth as a senior advisor responsible for Human Capital. He became the chairman at TPG portfolio company XOJet where he remains on the board of directors. In 2014 he became President of GreenTech Environmental in Johnson City Tennessee. He left GreenTech at the end of 2018 to pursue other opportunities.

As CEO of FAO Schwarz he was the inspiration for the Robert Loggia Character in the 1988 hit film Big.
