= Derrick Deese =

American football player (born 1970)

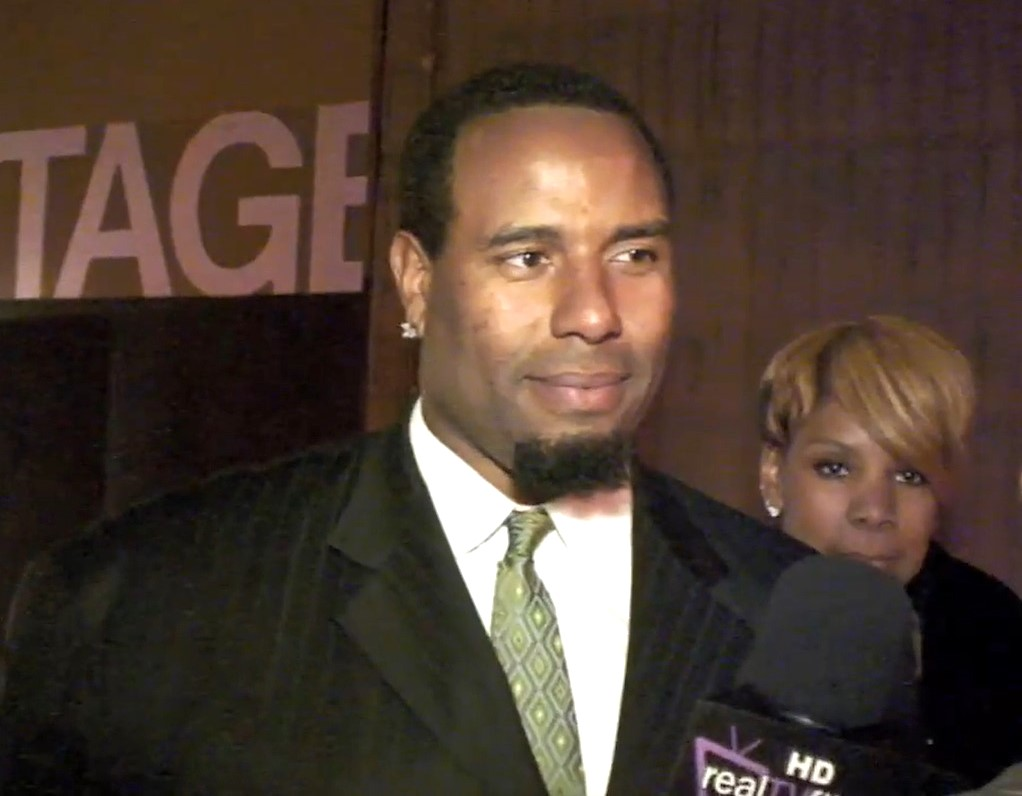
- Deese interviewed in 2010; his wife Felicia is in the background

No. 63, 70
- Position: Offensive lineman

Personal information
- Born: May 17, 1970 (age 56); Culver City, California, U.S.
- Listed height: 6 ft 3 in (1.91 m)
- Listed weight: 289 lb (131 kg)

Career information
- High school: Culver City
- College: USC
- NFL draft: 1992: undrafted

Career history
- San Francisco 49ers (1992–2003); Tampa Bay Buccaneers (2004)

Awards and highlights
- Super Bowl champion (XXIX)

Career NFL statistics
- Games played: 152
- Games started: 132
- Fumble recoveries: 7
- Stats at Pro Football Reference

Derrick Lynn Deese (born May 17, 1970) is an American former professional football player who was an offensive tackle in the National Football League (NFL). He played college football for the USC Trojans. Deese won a Super Bowl with the San Francisco 49ers. He became a co-host for a radio show on Fox Sports Radio weekends from 9 am to 1 pm Pacific Time.

== Early life and college ==
Deese prepped at Culver City High School. He is in the Culver City High School Hall Of Fame. Deese played college football at the University of Southern California (USC) after playing at El Camino College in Torrance, California. Deese is in the El Camino Hall of Fame. He is also in the California JC Football Hall Of Fame.

== Professional career ==
Deese spent the majority of his career with the San Francisco 49ers from 1992 through 2003. He played in the 49ers win in Super Bowl XXIX. During this time, he primarily played the position of left tackle. He played with the Tampa Bay Buccaneers in 2004 and 2005 and played all five positions on the offensive line during his career.

== Personal life ==
He has four sons, including Derrick Deese Jr., who played tight end at San Jose State, before being signed as an undrafted free agent by the Detroit Lions on April 30, 2022.
