= Giovanni Carmazzi =

American gridiron football player (born 1977)

No. 19
- Position: Quarterback

Personal information
- Born: April 14, 1977 (age 49); Sacramento, California, U.S.
- Listed height: 6 ft 3 in (1.91 m)
- Listed weight: 224 lb (102 kg)

Career information
- High school: Jesuit (Carmichael, California)
- College: Pacific (1995); Hofstra (1996–1999)
- NFL draft: 2000: 3rd round, 65th overall pick

Career history
- San Francisco 49ers (2000–2001); Rhein Fire (2001); BC Lions (2004); Calgary Stampeders (2005)

Awards and highlights
- ECAC Offensive Player of the Year (1999); First-team all-ECAC (1999)

Giovanni Carmazzi (born April 14, 1977) is an American former professional football player who was a quarterback for two seasons with the San Francisco 49ers of the National Football League (NFL). He played college football for the Hofstra Flying Dutchmen.

He was selected by the 49ers in the third round of the 2000 NFL draft. Carmazzi spent the entirety of his NFL career as a backup, never appearing in a regular season game. After being released by the 49ers, he spent one season in NFL Europe and two seasons in the Canadian Football League (CFL).

== College career ==
Carmazzi was recruited by Colgate and Villanova out of high school. He originally enrolled at University of the Pacific, but the Pacific Tigers football team was shut down at the end of the 1995 season. Pacific's assistant head coach Mike Clemons recommended Carmazzi to Hofstra's defensive coordinator and lead recruiter Greg Gigantino, who contacted Pacific asking for available players. Hofstra head coach Joe Gardi quipped after Carmazzi's transfer that "he is a coach's son and they don't get you fired."

He was named the starter to begin the 1996 season. In the first game against Sacramento State, Carmazzi threw a touchdown but only completed four of eight passes outside of the score, leading to backup Arthur Asselta taking over in the third quarter. Asselta also replaced Carmazzi in a loss to Southwest Texas State before assuming starting duties in Week 3 against Western Illinois. Carmazzi, Asselta, and Corey Joyce saw time as the starting quarterback as the offense continued to falter throughout the year, recording just 19 points per game after averaging 34 points in 1995. The poor production was attributed to a new offensive line and Carmazzi's early struggles in the run and shoot offense, which had to be simplified for him to understand at the start of the season. The Flying Dutchmen finished 5–6.

Carmazzi's performance improved upon becoming the permanent starter in 1997. Despite beginning the season with just 91 passing yards against Boston University, he threw for four touchdowns and 337 yards the following week to beat Southwest Texas State. By November, he led the NCAA Division I-AA in completion percentage, completing over 70 percent of his throws, and averaged 333 passing yards per game throughout the month. Hofstra ended the regular season with the second best passing offense in the country, averaging 328.6 yards per game, while Carmazzi set Hofstra's single-season records in completions and attempts (288 of 408), passing yards (3,554), and passing touchdowns (27) while leading the Flying Dutchmen in rushing scores with nine. Hofstra lost to Delaware in the first round of the Division I-AA playoffs, with Carmazzi throwing two touchdowns in garbage time. He was named third-team I-AA All-American.

The Flying Dutchmen began the 1998 season 3–0 and ranked as high as fifth before losing twice as the defense gave up 40 points in each game while the offense struggled against increased blitzing despite high yardage. During the skid, Carmazzi recorded 483 all-purpose yards with 344 passing and 139 rushing in a 40–35 defeat to UMass followed by 306 passing yards in a 40–18 losing effort against UConn. After six games, Hofstra's offense was averaging 449 yards per game yet the defense was surrendering 411. Despite the early difficulties, Hofstra continued to pursue a playoff spot as Carmazzi had performances that included three touchdowns to beat Liberty 38–24 and four scores in a 44–36 shootout victory over Buffalo. However, the Flying Dutchmen missed the playoffs with a 8–3 record. Carmazzi finished the season with 2,751 passing yards and 18 touchdowns.

Ahead of his senior year, Carmazzi underwent an arthroscopy on his left knee. The 1999 Flying Dutchmen averaged 33.8 points and 416.8 yards per game as they finished 10–1 in the regular season, with Carmazzi throwing for a season-high 335 yards and three touchdowns in the final game against James Madison. In the first round of the playoffs, Hofstra came back from trailing 10–0 to beat Lehigh 27–15; Carmazzi recorded 258 passing yards with two touchdown throws and another rushing. The Flying Dutchmen were defeated in the next round by Illinois State, against whom Carmazzi completed 28 of 35 for 291 yards and two touchdowns. He concluded the season with 2,651 passing yards and 21 touchdowns. He was a finalist for the Walter Payton Award, nominated for the Johnny Unitas Golden Arm Award, and named to multiple I-AA All-American rosters. Carmazzi was also honored with the Eastern College Athletic Conference's Offensive Player of the Year award and first-team all-ECAC.

Carmazzi ended his career holding the school records for passing yards (9,371), touchdown passes (71), and total offensive yards (10,415) across 39 games.

== Professional career ==
Pre-draft measurables
Height	Weight	Arm length	Hand span	40-yard dash	10-yard split	20-yard split	20-yard shuttle	Three-cone drill	Vertical jump	Broad jump	Wonderlic
6 ft 2 5/8 in (1.90 m)	224 lb (102 kg)	32 1/4 in (0.82 m)	9 1/2 in (0.24 m)	4.72 s	1.69 s	2.79 s	4.23 s	6.94 s	36.5 in (0.93 m)	9 ft 11 in (3.02 m)	32
All values from NFL Combine

Ahead of the 2000 NFL draft, Carmazzi played in the Senior Bowl, the first Hofstra player to take part. He was projected as a fourth-round draft pick and ranked as high as third in the National Scouting Service, with his size and intellect being viewed as his strengths while concerns focused on the level of competition he faced in college and his throwing power.

Carmazzi was selected by the San Francisco 49ers 65th overall in the third round, the second quarterback taken. He was also one of six drafted before Michigan quarterback Tom Brady, who would become one of the league's most decorated players in history. In a 2016 interview, then-49ers coach Steve Mariucci explained the team had taken interest in Carmazzi because "he had all of the measurables academically with intelligence and he had all of the measurables athletically," such as his high Wonderlic test score and mobility.

In the early days of training camp, Carmazzi developed a nerve condition in his arm that produced a "paralyzing effect" and substantially hindered his throwing strength. As a result, he struggled against the Brady-led New England Patriots in the Pro Football Hall of Fame Game, completing only 3 of 7 passes for 19 yards in a 20–0 loss. He subsequently underwent shoulder surgery, but found it did not improve his condition until he had undergone three surgeries on the nerves in his elbow three years later; he also had a procedure done on his knee.

Carmazzi would spend two seasons in San Francisco, but never saw regular season action. He was assigned to the Rhein Fire of NFL Europe in 2001, throwing two touchdown passes in his debut but was otherwise the backup to Phil Stambaugh, who played against Carmazzi with Lehigh. Mariucci explained the 49ers "gave Gio every option to stick around. We sent him to Europe. He ended up hurting his shoulder. He tried, but failed, to learn a new system. We made a mistake."

After leaving the 49ers, he tried out for the Kansas City Chiefs in 2003 and the Atlanta Falcons and Arena Football League's Georgia Force in 2004, but did not receive a contract. The BC Lions of the Canadian Football League subsequently signed him to be the third-string quarterback for the 2004 season. Carmazzi was with the Calgary Stampeders in 2005.

== Recognition ==
Carmazzi was a 1999 National Football Foundation National Scholar-Athlete and Burger King Scholar Athlete of the Year while playing at Hofstra University, a 1996 high school scholar-athlete honoree awarded by the Sacramento Chapter and a 1996 West Region High School Scholar-Athlete of the Year. He is one of only four all-time NFF awardees in all three of these categories. He was also a candidate for a Rhodes Scholarship with a grade point average of 3.95, though he withdrew to focus on the NFL.

He was inducted into the Hofstra Athletics Hall of Fame in 2011.

== Personal life ==
Carmazzi is of Italian descent. His father Dan was an All-American quarterback for UC Davis before coaching his son at Jesuit High School of Sacramento.

Following his retirement from football, Carmazzi settled in northern California as a farmer, yoga practitioner, and owner of five goats. He also assisted in developing Smartmed Technologies, an online software program for physicians.
