= Brian Jennings =

American football player (born 1976)

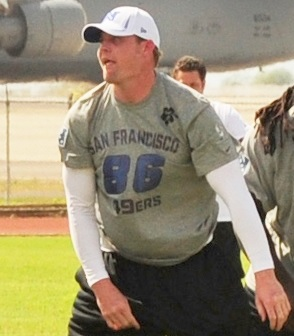
- Jennings practices for the 2012 Pro Bowl

No. 86
- Position: Long snapper

Personal information
- Born: October 14, 1976 (age 50); Mesa, Arizona, U.S.
- Listed height: 6 ft 5 in (1.96 m)
- Listed weight: 242 lb (110 kg)

Career information
- High school: Red Mountain (Mesa)
- College: Arizona State
- NFL draft: 2000: 7th round, 230th overall pick

Career history
- San Francisco 49ers (2000–2012)

Awards and highlights
- 2× Pro Bowl (2004, 2011)

Career NFL statistics
- Games played: 208
- Total tackles: 46
- Fumble recoveries: 1
- Stats at Pro Football Reference

Brian Lewis Jennings (born October 14, 1976) is an American former professional football player who was a long snapper for the San Francisco 49ers of the National Football League (NFL). He played college football for the Arizona State Sun Devils, and was selected by the 49ers in the seventh round of the 2000 NFL draft. He was a twice Pro Bowl selection, having been chosen for the 2004 and 2012 Pro Bowls as a special teams player. He is the founder of Jennings 1–4–1, dedicated to developing the skill of long snapping.

== Early life ==
Jennings was born in Mesa, Arizona. At Red Mountain High School in Mesa, he lettered in football, basketball, and track. As a senior, he was the team captain of the football team and was an all-region honorable mention as a tight end.

== College career ==
Jennings attended Arizona State University, where he played in 32 games as a tight end and long snapper for the Arizona State Sun Devils football team. He finished his college career with four receptions, one touchdown and nine tackles.

== Professional career ==
Jennings played his entire career as the starting long snapper for the San Francisco 49ers, a role he filled for the team for thirteen seasons.

In 2003, Jennings signed an offer sheet as a restricted free agent with the Detroit Lions. The 49ers matched the offer, and ultimately signed Jennings to a long-term deal.

In 2011, Jennings and Amendment M started Jennings 1–4–1, a long snapping camp for players of all ages. The first camp took place on July 16 at Spartan Stadium in San Jose, California.

Jennings was selected to his second Pro Bowl following the 2011 season. He had previously been named to the Pro Bowl following the 2003 season.

At the end of the 2012 season, Jennings and the 49ers appeared in Super Bowl XLVII. In the game, he contributed on special teams, but the 49ers fell to the Baltimore Ravens by a score of 34–31.

Jennings was released by the 49ers prior to the start of the 2013 NFL season.

== Post-football career ==
Jennings is a regular on KNBR radio, due to his lively personality and intelligently comedic commentary. Jennings has also appeared on the Point After with Mark Ibanez doing post-game commentary on KTVU.

He also has a very peculiar diet, eschewing poultry and pork, largely subsisting on a strict whole grain and beef diet.
