= 1992 Atlanta Falcons season =

NFL team season

- Owner: Rankin Smith
- Head coach: Jerry Glanville
- Home stadium: Georgia Dome

Results
- Record: 6–10
- Division place: 3rd NFC West
- Playoffs: Did not qualify
- Pro Bowlers: WR Andre Rison; CB Deion Sanders; ST Elbert Shelley

The 1992 Atlanta Falcons season was the team's 27th season in the National Football League (NFL). Atlanta played its first season in the Georgia Dome, after having played their first 26 seasons at Fulton County Stadium. The Falcons were unable to match their previous season's output of 10–6 and failed to reach the playoffs. One highlight from this season includes Green Bay Packers quarterback Brett Favre's first return to Atlanta in Week 5 for the first time since being traded from the Falcons during the offseason.

Atlanta was statistically one of the worst defenses in the NFL in 1992. They were the league's worst team in points allowed (414), total yards allowed (5,549), yards per play (5.9), rushing yards allowed (2,294), and yards per rushing attempt (4.9).

== Offseason ==
Additions	Subtractions
WR Drew Hill (Oilers)	QB Brett Favre (Packers)
LB Jesse Solomon (Buccaneers)	OT Joe Sims (Packers)
QB Wade Wilson (Vikings)	WR Floyd Dixon (Eagles)
LB Brian Forde (Saints)	C Guy Bingham (Redskins)
	LB Aundray Bruce (Raiders)
	RB Mike Rozier (retirement)
	S Brian Jordan (retirement)
	WR Shawn Collins (Browns)

=== NFL draft ===
1992 Atlanta Falcons draft
Round	Pick	Player	Position	College	Notes
1	7	Bob Whitfield *	Offensive tackle	Stanford	
1	19	Tony Smith	Running back	Southern Mississippi	
2	51	Chuck Smith	Defensive end	Tennessee	
3	73	Howard Dinkins	Linebacker	Florida State	
4	104	Frankie Smith	Cornerback	Baylor	
6	158	Terry Ray	Safety	Oklahoma	
7	182	Tim Paulk	Linebacker	Florida	
8	216	Derrick Moore	Running back	Northeastern State	
8	217	Reggie Dwight	Tight end	Troy	
9	243	Keith Alex	Guard	Texas A&M	
10	270	Darryl Hardy	Linebacker	Tennessee	
11	297	Robin Jones	Defensive end	Baylor	
Made roster * Made at least one Pro Bowl during career

== Personnel ==
=== Staff ===
1992 Atlanta Falcons staff
Front office: Chairman of the Board – Rankin M. Smith Sr.; President – Taylor Smith; Vice President of Player Personnel – Ken Herock; Director of pro personnel – Chuck Connor; Head coaches: Head coach – Jerry Glanville; Offensive coaches: Assistant head coach/offense – June Jones; Running Backs – Ollie Wilson; Wide receivers – Jimmy Robinson; Tight ends – Bobby April; Offensive line – Keith Rowen	Defensive coaches: Assistant head coach/defense – Doug Shively; Defensive line – Bill Kollar; Secondary – Jimmy Carr; Special teams coaches: Special teams – Bobby April; Strength and conditioning: Strength and conditioning – Tim Jorgensen

=== Roster ===
1992 Atlanta Falcons roster
Quarterbacks (QB): 11 Billy Joe Tolliver; 18 Wade Wilson; Running backs (RB): 34 Steve Broussard; 38 Keith Jones; 36 Derrick Moore; 41 Erric Pegram; Wide receivers (WR): 81 Michael Haynes; 85 Drew Hill; 87 James Milling; 82 Jason Phillips; 35 Mike Pritchard; 80 Andre Rison; Tight ends (TE): 88 Harper LeBel LS	Offensive linemen (OL): 64 Jamie Dukes C; 65 Roman Fortin C; 79 Bill Fralic G; 71 Chris Hinton T; 69 Houston Hoover G; 78 Mike Kenn T; 55 Mike Ruether G; 70 Bob Whitfield T; Defensive linemen (DL): 68 Mel Agee DE; 72 Oliver Barnett DE; 74 Tory Epps NT; 67 Moe Gardner NT; 71 Bill Goldberg NT; 90 Chuck Smith DE; 73 John Washington DE	Linebackers (LB): 56 Darion Conner OLB; 95 Michael Reid ILB; 54 Jesse Solomon ILB; 52 Ken Tippins OLB; 58 Jessie Tuggle ILB; Defensive backs (DB): 23 Bobby Butler CB; 25 Scott Case FS; 42 Jeff Donaldson SS; 29 Joe Fishback SS; 22 Tim McKyer CB; 24 Brian Mitchell CB; 39 Bruce Pickens CB; 30 Terry Ray FS; 26 Louis Riddick FS; 21 Deion Sanders CB; 37 Elbert Shelley CB; 46 Charles Washington SS; Special teams (ST): 17 Scott Fulhage P; 9 Norm Johnson K	Practice squad: 63 John Buddenberg G; 49 Reggie Dwight TE; 62 Oscar Giles LB; 50 Darryl Hardy LB; Reserve: 32 Tracey Eaton S (IR); 77 Rick Bryan DE (IR); 51 Howard Dinkins LB (IR); 53 Brian Forde LB (IR); 76 Mike Gann DE (NF-Inj.); 99 Tim Green DE (IR); 83 Tony Jones WR (IR); 12 Chris Miller QB (IR); 59 John Rade LB (IR); 28 Tony Smith RB (IR); -- Dave Zawatson T (IR); 47 active, 11 inactive, 4 practice squad Rookies in italics

== Regular season ==
=== Schedule ===
Week	Date	Opponent	Result	Record	Venue	Attendance	Recap
1	September 6	New York Jets	**W** 20–17	1–0	Georgia Dome	65,585	Recap
2	September 13	at Washington Redskins	**L** 17–24	1–1	RFK Stadium	54,343	Recap
3	September 20	**New Orleans Saints**	**L** 7–10	1–2	Georgia Dome	67,328	Recap
4	September 27	at Chicago Bears	**L** 31–41	1–3	Soldier Field	63,528	Recap
5	October 4	Green Bay Packers	**W** 24–10	2–3	Georgia Dome	63,769	Recap
6	October 11	at Miami Dolphins	**L** 17–21	2–4	Joe Robbie Stadium	68,633	Recap
7	October 18	at **San Francisco 49ers**	**L** 17–56	2–5	Candlestick Park	63,302	Recap
8	Bye						
9	November 1	**Los Angeles Rams**	**W** 30–28	3–5	Georgia Dome	62,168	Recap
10	November 9	**San Francisco 49ers**	**L** 3–41	3–6	Georgia Dome	67,404	Recap
11	November 15	Phoenix Cardinals	**W** 20–17	4–6	Georgia Dome	58,477	Recap
12	November 22	at Buffalo Bills	**L** 14–41	4–7	Rich Stadium	80,004	Recap
13	November 29	New England Patriots	**W** 34–0	5–7	Georgia Dome	54,494	Recap
14	December 3	at **New Orleans Saints**	**L** 14–22	5–8	Louisiana Superdome	68,591	Recap
15	December 13	at Tampa Bay Buccaneers	**W** 35–7	6–8	Tampa Stadium	39,056	Recap
16	December 21	Dallas Cowboys	**L** 17–41	6–9	Georgia Dome	67,036	Recap
17	December 27	at **Los Angeles Rams**	**L** 27–38	6–10	Anaheim Stadium	37,706	Recap
Note: Intra-division opponents are in **bold** text.

=== Standings ===
NFC West
	W	L	T	PCT	DIV	CONF	PF	PA	STK
^{(1)} San Francisco 49ers	14	2	0	.875	6–0	11–1	431	236	W8
^{(4)} New Orleans Saints	12	4	0	.750	4–2	9–3	330	202	W1
Atlanta Falcons	6	10	0	.375	1–5	4–8	327	414	L2
Los Angeles Rams	6	10	0	.375	1–5	4–8	313	383	W1
