= 1993 Atlanta Falcons season =

NFL team season

- Owner: Rankin Smith
- Head coach: Jerry Glanville
- Home stadium: Georgia Dome

Results
- Record: 6–10
- Division place: 3rd NFC West
- Playoffs: Did not qualify
- Pro Bowlers: WR Andre Rison; QB Bobby Hebert; CB Deion Sanders; K Norm Johnson; ST Elbert Shelley

The 1993 Atlanta Falcons season was the franchise's 28th season in the National Football League (NFL). The team finished 6–10 for the second straight season. Following the season, head coach Jerry Glanville would be fired.

== Offseason ==
=== NFL draft ===
1993 Atlanta Falcons draft
Round	Pick	Player	Position	College	Notes
1	9	Lincoln Kennedy *	Offensive tackle	Washington	
2	38	Roger Harper	Safety	Ohio State	
3	67	Harold Alexander	Punter	Appalachian State	
5	121	Ron George	Linebacker	Stanford	
6	151	Mitch Lyons	Tight end	Michigan State	
7	178	Darnell Walker	Cornerback	Oklahoma	
8	205	Shannon Baker	Wide receiver	Florida State	
Made roster * Made at least one Pro Bowl during career

== Personnel ==
=== Staff ===
1993 Atlanta Falcons staff
Front office: Chairman of the Board – Rankin M. Smith Sr.; President – Taylor Smith; Vice President of Player Personnel – Ken Herock; Director of Pro Personnel – Chuck Connor; Head coaches: Head Coach – Jerry Glanville; Offensive coaches: Assistant Head Coach/Offense – June Jones; Running Backs – Ollie Wilson; Wide Receivers – Jimmy Robinson; Tight Ends – Bobby April; Offensive Line – Keith Rowen	Defensive coaches: Assistant Head Coach/Defense – Doug Shively; Defensive Line – Bill Kollar; Secondary – Jimmy Carr; Special teams coaches: Special Teams – Bobby April; Strength and conditioning: Strength and Conditioning – Tim Jorgensen

=== Roster ===
1993 Atlanta Falcons roster
Quarterbacks (QB): 14 Bob Gagliano; 3 Bobby Hebert; 11 Billy Joe Tolliver; Running backs (RB): 44 Steve Broussard; 33 Erric Pegram; 28 Tony Smith; 40 Anthony Wallace; Wide receivers (WR): 81 Michael Haynes; 85 Drew Hill; 34 David Mims; 82 Jason Phillips; 35 Mike Pritchard; 80 Andre Rison; Tight ends (TE): 88 Harper LeBel LS; 86 Mitch Lyons	Offensive linemen (OL): 62 Keith Alex G/T; 64 Jamie Dukes C; 65 Roman Fortin G/C; 71 Chris Hinton T; 78 Mike Kenn T; 66 Lincoln Kennedy G; 55 Mike Ruether G/C; 61 Robbie Tobeck C; 70 Bob Whitfield T; Defensive linemen (DL): 68 Mel Agee DE; 92 Lester Archambeau DE; 67 Moe Gardner DT; 97 Jumpy Geathers DT; 71 Bill Goldberg DT; 99 Tim Green DE; 95 Pierce Holt DT; 73 Ernie Logan DT; 90 Chuck Smith DE	Linebackers (LB): 56 Darion Conner OLB; 51 Howard Dinkins OLB; 50 Ron George OLB; 53 Dwayne Gordon MLB; 54 Jesse Solomon OLB; 52 Ken Tippins OLB; 58 Jessie Tuggle MLB; Defensive backs (DB): 25 Scott Case FS; 27 Vinnie Clark CB; 32 Tracey Eaton SS; 47 Roger Harper SS; 24 Brian Mitchell CB; 22 Alton Montgomery FS; 21 Deion Sanders CB; 37 Elbert Shelley SS; 39 Lemuel Stinson CB; 45 Darnell Walker CB; 46 Charles Washington SS; Special teams (ST): 5 Harold Alexander P; 9 Norm Johnson K	Practice squad: 7 Chris Hakel QB; 69 Baron Rollins G; 84 Darryl Spencer WR; Reserve: 77 Rick Bryan DE (IR); 42 Jeff Donaldson S (IR); 76 Mike Gann DE (IR); 93 Frank Giannetti DT (IR); 12 Chris Miller QB (IR); 53 active, 5 inactive, 3 practice squad Rookies in italics

== Regular season ==
=== Schedule ===
Week	Date	Opponent	Result	Record	Venue	Attendance	Recap
1	September 5	at Detroit Lions	**L** 13–30	0–1	Pontiac Silverdome	56,216	Recap
2	September 12	**New Orleans Saints**	**L** 31–34	0–2	Georgia Dome	64,287	Recap
3	September 19	at **San Francisco 49ers**	**L** 30–37	0–3	Candlestick Park	63,032	Recap
4	September 27	Pittsburgh Steelers	**L** 17–45	0–4	Georgia Dome	65,477	Recap
5	October 3	at Chicago Bears	**L** 0–6	0–5	Soldier Field	57,441	Recap
6	Bye						
7	October 14	**Los Angeles Rams**	**W** 30–24	1–5	Georgia Dome	45,231	Recap
8	October 24	at **New Orleans Saints**	**W** 26–15	2–5	Louisiana Superdome	69,043	Recap
9	October 31	Tampa Bay Buccaneers	**L** 24–31	2–6	Georgia Dome	50,647	Recap
10	Bye						
11	November 14	at **Los Angeles Rams**	**W** 13–0	3–6	Anaheim Stadium	37,073	Recap
12	November 21	Dallas Cowboys	**W** 27–14	4–6	Georgia Dome	67,337	Recap
13	November 28	Cleveland Browns	**W** 17–14	5–6	Georgia Dome	54,510	Recap
14	December 5	at Houston Oilers	**L** 17–33	5–7	Astrodome	58,186	Recap
15	December 11	**San Francisco 49ers**	**W** 27–24	6–7	Georgia Dome	64,688	Recap
16	December 19	at Washington Redskins	**L** 17–30	6–8	RFK Stadium	50,192	Recap
17	December 26	at Cincinnati Bengals	**L** 17–21	6–9	Riverfront Stadium	27,014	Recap
18	January 2, 1994	Phoenix Cardinals	**L** 10–27	6–10	Georgia Dome	44,360	Recap
Note: Intra-division opponents are in **bold** text.

=== Standings ===
NFC West
	W	L	T	PCT	PF	PA	STK
^{(2)} San Francisco 49ers	10	6	0	.625	473	295	L2
New Orleans Saints	8	8	0	.500	317	343	W1
Atlanta Falcons	6	10	0	.375	316	385	L3
Los Angeles Rams	5	11	0	.313	221	367	W1

== Transactions ==
- October 12: The Atlanta Falcons trade running back Eric Dickerson and cornerback Bruce Pickens to the Green Bay Packers.
