= 1991 Atlanta Falcons season =

NFL team season

- Owner: Rankin Smith
- Head coach: Jerry Glanville
- Offensive coordinator: June Jones
- Defensive coordinator: Doug Shively
- Home stadium: Fulton County Stadium

Results
- Record: 10–6
- Division place: 2nd NFC West
- Playoffs: Won Wild Card Playoffs (at Saints) 27–20; Lost Divisional Playoffs (at Redskins) 7–24
- All-Pros: 3: OT Mike Kenn (1st team); WR Andre Rison (2nd team); CB Deion Sanders (2nd team)
- Pro Bowlers: 4: OT Chris Hinton; WR Andre Rison; QB Chris Miller; CB Deion Sanders

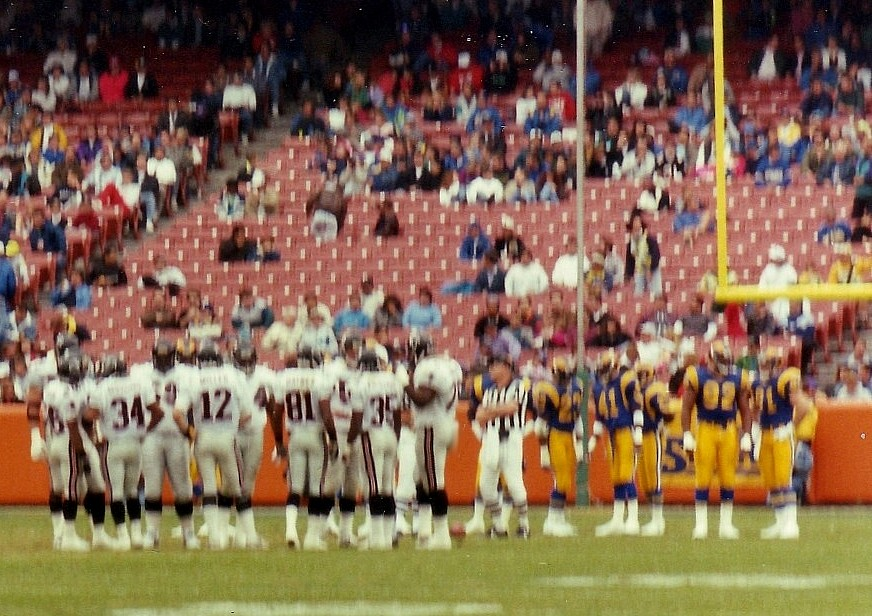
The Falcons playing against the LA Rams at Anaheim Stadium in 1991

The 1991 Atlanta Falcons season was the team's 26th season in the National Football League (NFL). It was also the final season they played at Fulton County Stadium, before moving into the Georgia Dome the following season. The season would be the most successful Atlanta had compiled in almost a decade, with the team recording a winning record and clinching a playoff berth for the first time in nine years. Additionally, the Falcons won their first playoff game since 1978, by defeating the New Orleans Saints 27–20 in the NFC Wild Card Game. The following week, they would lose to the eventual Super Bowl champion Washington Redskins 24–7 in the divisional round.

The last remaining active member of the 1991 Atlanta Falcons was quarterback Brett Favre, who retired after the 2010 season.

== Offseason ==
=== NFL draft ===
The Falcons’ most notable selection in the 1991 NFL draft was future Hall of Fame quarterback Brett Favre, who was drafted in the second round, 33rd overall. Head coach Jerry Glanville disapproved of the selection and said it would take a plane crash for him to put Favre into the game. Favre's first pass in an NFL regular season game resulted in an interception returned for a touchdown. He only attempted four passes in his career at Atlanta, completing none of them. After the season ended, Favre was traded to the Green Bay Packers, where he remained for the following sixteen seasons. He went on to lead the Packers to eleven playoff appearances, two Super Bowl appearances, and their third Super Bowl title in Super Bowl XXXI. Favre also won three consecutive MVP awards, and was a 9-time Pro Bowler during his tenure in Green Bay.

1991 Atlanta Falcons draft
Round	Pick	Player	Position	College	Notes
1	3	Bruce Pickens	Cornerback	Nebraska	
1	13	Mike Pritchard	Wide receiver	Colorado	
2	33	Brett Favre * ^{†}	Quarterback	Southern Mississippi	
4	87	Moe Gardner	Defensive tackle	Illinois	
5	114	James Goode	Linebacker	Oklahoma	
6	145	Erric Pegram	Running back	North Texas	
7	172	Brian Mitchell	Cornerback	BYU	
7	186	Mark Tucker	Guard	USC	
8	199	Randy Austin	Tight end	UCLA	
9	226	Ernie Logan	Defensive tackle	East Carolina	
10	256	Walter Sutton	Wide receiver	Southwest Minnesota State	
10	258	Pete Lucas	Offensive tackle	Wisconsin–Stevens Point	
11	283	Joe Sims	Offensive tackle	Nebraska	
12	310	Bob Christian	Fullback	Northwestern	
Made roster † Pro Football Hall of Fame * Made at least one Pro Bowl during career

== Personnel ==
=== Staff ===
1991 Atlanta Falcons staff
Front office: Chairman of the board – Rankin M. Smith Sr.; President – Taylor Smith; Vice-president of player personnel – Ken Herock; Director of pro scouting – Chuck Connor; Head coaches: Head coach – Jerry Glanville; Offensive coaches: Assistant head coach/offense – June Jones; Running backs – Ollie Wilson; Wide receivers – Jimmy Robinson; Tight ends – Bobby April; Offensive line – Keith Rowen	Defensive coaches: Assistant head coachdefense – Doug Shively; Defensive line – Bill Kollar; Secondary – Jimmy Carr; Special teams coaches: Special teams – Bobby April; Strength and conditioning: Strength and conditioning – Tim Jorgensen

=== Roster ===
1991 Atlanta Falcons roster
Quarterbacks (QB): 4 Brett Favre; 12 Chris Miller; 13 Billy Joe Tolliver; Running backs (RB): 34 Steve Broussard; 28 Pat Chaffey; 43 Tracy Johnson; 41 Erric Pegram; 30 Mike Rozier; Wide receivers (WR): 86 Floyd Dixon; 81 Michael Haynes; 82 Jason Phillips; 35 Mike Pritchard; 80 Andre Rison; 89 George Thomas; Tight ends (TE): 83 Aundray Bruce	Offensive linemen (OL): 65 Guy Bingham; 64 Jamie Dukes C; 79 Bill Fralic G; 71 Chris Hinton T; 69 Houston Hoover G; 78 Mike Kenn T; 70 Reggie Redding G; 55 Mike Ruether G; 66 Joe Sims T; Defensive linemen (DL): 72 Oliver Barnett DE; 77 Rick Bryan DE; 74 Tory Epps NT; 67 Moe Gardner NT; 99 Tim Green DE	Linebackers (LB): 56 Darion Conner OLB; 54 Robert Lyles OLB; 59 John Rade ILB; 52 Ken Tippins ILB; 58 Jessie Tuggle ILB; Defensive backs (DB): 23 Bobby Butler CB; 25 Scott Case FS; 42 Jeff Donaldson SS; 32 Tracey Eaton FS; 29 Joe Fishback FS; 40 Brian Jordan SS; 22 Tim McKyer CB; 36 Brian Mitchell CB; 39 Bruce Pickens CB; 21 Deion Sanders CB; 37 Elbert Shelley SS; Special teams (ST): 17 Scott Fulhage P; 9 Norm Johnson K	Practice squad: 84 Karl Miller WR; 96 LeRoy Truitt G; Reserve: 85 Shawn Collins WR (IR); 76 Mike Gann DE (IR); 68 John Hunter T (IR); 38 Keith Jones RB (IR); 88 Harper LeBel LS (IR); 95 Michael Reid LB (IR); 91 Donnie Salum LB (IR); 87 Gary Wilkins TE (IR); 47 active, 8 inactive, 2 practice squad Rookies in italics

== Preseason ==
Week	Date	Opponent	Result	Record	Venue	Attendance
1	August 3	vs. Los Angeles Rams	W 38–17	1–0	Gator Bowl	66,531
2	August 9	at Houston Oilers	W 36–7	2–0	Houston Astrodome	52,170
3	August 17	Tampa Bay Buccaneers	L 7–12	2–1	Atlanta–Fulton County Stadium	41,983
4	August 23	at Dallas Cowboys	L 17–20 (OT)	2–2	Texas Stadium	53,689

== Regular season ==
=== Schedule ===
Week	Date	Opponent	Result	Record	Venue	Attendance	Recap
1	September 1	at Kansas City Chiefs	**L** 3–14	0–1	Arrowhead Stadium	74,246	Recap
2	September 8	Minnesota Vikings	**L** 19–20	0–2	Atlanta–Fulton County Stadium	50,936	Recap
3	September 15	at San Diego Chargers	**W** 13–10	1–2	Jack Murphy Stadium	44,804	Recap
4	September 22	Los Angeles Raiders	**W** 21–17	2–2	Atlanta–Fulton County Stadium	53,615	Recap
5	September 29	**New Orleans Saints**	**L** 6–27	2–3	Atlanta–Fulton County Stadium	56,556	Recap
6	Bye						
7	October 13	at **San Francisco 49ers**	**W** 39–34	3–3	Candlestick Park	57,343	Recap
8	October 20	at Phoenix Cardinals	**L** 10–16	3–4	Sun Devil Stadium	29,804	Recap
9	October 27	**Los Angeles Rams**	**W** 31–14	4–4	Atlanta–Fulton County Stadium	50,187	Recap
10	November 3	**San Francisco 49ers**	**W** 17–14	5–4	Atlanta–Fulton County Stadium	51,259	Recap
11	November 10	at Washington Redskins	**L** 17–56	5–5	RFK Stadium	52,461	Recap
12	November 17	Tampa Bay Buccaneers	**W** 43–7	6–5	Atlanta–Fulton County Stadium	41,274	Recap
13	November 24	at **New Orleans Saints**	**W** 23–20 (OT)	7–5	Louisiana Superdome	68,591	Recap
14	December 1	Green Bay Packers	**W** 35–31	8–5	Atlanta–Fulton County Stadium	43,270	Recap
15	December 8	at **Los Angeles Rams**	**W** 31–14	9–5	Anaheim Stadium	35,315	Recap
16	December 15	Seattle Seahawks	**W** 26–13	10–5	Atlanta–Fulton County Stadium	53,834	Recap
17	December 22	at Dallas Cowboys	**L** 27–31	10–6	Texas Stadium	60,962	Recap
Note: Intra-division opponents are in **bold** text.

=== Standings ===
NFC West
	W	L	T	PCT	DIV	CONF	PF	PA	STK
^{(3)} New Orleans Saints	11	5	0	.688	4–2	8–4	341	211	W2
^{(6)} Atlanta Falcons	10	6	0	.625	5–1	7–5	361	338	L1
San Francisco 49ers	10	6	0	.625	3–3	7–5	393	239	W6
Los Angeles Rams	3	13	0	.188	0–6	2–10	234	390	L10

=== Game summaries ===
==== Week 1 ====
Team	1	2	3	4	Total
Falcons	3	0	0	0	3
• Chiefs	0	0	7	7	14

- Date: September 1
- Location: Arrowhead Stadium
- Game start: 12:00 CST
- Referee: Dick Hantak
- Television network: CBS

==== Week 2 ====
Team	1	2	3	4	Total
• Vikings	7	0	7	6	20
Falcons	3	7	0	9	19

- Date: September 8
- Location: Atlanta–Fulton County Stadium
- Game start: 1:00 EST
- Referee: Tom White
- Television network: CBS

==== Week 3 ====
Team	1	2	3	4	Total
• Falcons	7	3	3	0	13
Chargers	0	7	0	3	10

- Date: September 15
- Location: Jack Murphy Stadium
- Game start: 1:00 PST
- Television network: CBS

==== Week 4 ====
Team	1	2	3	4	Total
Raiders	0	7	7	3	17
• Falcons	7	0	7	7	21

- Date: September 22
- Location: Atlanta–Fulton County Stadium
- Referee: Johnny Grier
- TV announcers (NBC): Don Criqui and Bob Trumpy

==== Week 5 ====
Team	1	2	3	4	Total
• Saints	3	7	10	7	27
Falcons	0	6	0	0	6

- Date: September 29
- Location: Atlanta–Fulton County Stadium
- Referee: Larry Nemmers
- TV announcers (CBS): Jim Nantz and Hank Stram

==== Week 7 ====
Team	1	2	3	4	Total
• Falcons	14	6	13	6	39
49ers	0	14	13	7	34

- Date: October 13
- Location: Candlestick Park
- Referee: Bob McElwee
- TV announcers (CBS): James Brown and Randy Cross

Originally a home game for the Falcons, Week 7 was moved to San Francisco because the Atlanta Braves were hosting the National League Championship Series that day.

==== Week 8 ====
Team	1	2	3	4	Total
Falcons	7	3	0	0	10
• Cardinals	3	0	10	3	16

- Date: October 20
- Location: Sun Devil Stadium
- Referee: Red Cashion
- TV announcers (CBS): Tim Ryan and Irv Cross

==== Week 9 ====
Team	1	2	3	4	Total
Rams	0	0	0	14	14
• Falcons	7	14	10	0	31

- Date: October 27
- Location: Atlanta–Fulton County Stadium
- Game start: 1:00 p.m. EST
- Game weather: 71 °F or 21.7 °C; wind 10 miles per hour (16 km/h; 8.7 kn)
- Referee: Gerald Austin
- Television network: CBS

Scoring summary
Q1	8:08	ATL	Dixon 19 yard pass from Miller (N. Johnson kick)	ATL 7–0
Q2	7:28	ATL	Chaffey 5 yard run (N. Johnson kick)	ATL 14–0
Q2	0:22	ATL	Rison 20 yard pass from Miller (N. Johnson kick)	ATL 21–0
Q3	11:50	ATL	Haynes 55 yard pass from Miller (N. Johnson kick)	ATL 28–0
Q3	0:53	ATL	N. Johnson 44 yard field goal	ATL 31–0
Q4	13:32	LA	Delpino 9 yard run (Zendejas kick)	ATL 31–7
Q4	1:54	LA	Carter 18 yard pass from Pagel (Zendejas kick)	ATL 31–14

- Michael Haynes 4 Rec, 110 Yds

==== Week 10 ====
Team	1	2	3	4	Total
49ers	0	7	0	7	14
• Falcons	0	0	0	17	17

- Date: November 3
- Location: Atlanta–Fulton County Stadium
- Game start: 1:00 EST
- Referee: Bernie Kukar
- TV announcers (CBS): Jim Nantz and Hank Stram

==== Week 11 ====
Team	1	2	3	4	Total
Falcons	3	0	14	0	17
• Redskins	7	21	7	21	56

- Date: November 10
- Location: RFK Stadium
- Referee: Dale Hamer
- TV announcers (CBS): James Brown and Randy Cross

==== Week 12 ====
Team	1	2	3	4	Total
Buccaneers	0	0	0	7	7
• Falcons	0	33	3	7	43

- Date: November 17
- Location: Atlanta–Fulton County Stadium
- Referee: Tom Dooley
- Television network: CBS

==== Week 13 ====
Team	1	2	3	4	OT	Total
• Falcons	0	3	7	10	3	23
Saints	0	7	6	7	0	20

- Date: November 24
- Location: Louisiana Superdome
- Game weather: Indoors (dome)
- Referee: Tom White
- TV announcers (ESPN): Mike Patrick and Joe Theismann

==== Week 14 ====
Team	1	2	3	4	Total
Packers	7	14	0	10	31
• Falcons	7	0	7	21	35

- Date: December 1
- Location: Atlanta–Fulton County Stadium
- Referee: Gordon McCarter
- TV announcers (CBS): James Brown and Randy Cross

==== Week 15 ====
Team	1	2	3	4	Total
• Falcons	10	14	7	0	31
Rams	0	7	0	7	14

- Date: December 8
- Location: Anaheim Stadium
- Referee: Larry Nemmers
- TV announcers (CBS): Brad Nessler and Merlin Olsen

==== Week 16 ====
Team	1	2	3	4	Total
Seahawks	0	0	3	10	13
• Falcons	2	10	7	7	26

- Date: December 15
- Location: Atlanta–Fulton County Stadium
- Referee: Tom Dooley
- TV announcers (NBC): Joel Meyers and Dan Hampton

==== Week 17 ====
Team	1	2	3	4	Total
Falcons	14	3	10	0	27
• Cowboys	21	3	0	7	31

- Date: December 22
- Location: Texas Stadium
- Referee: Johnny Grier
- TV announcers (CBS): Dick Stockton and Merlin Olsen

== Playoffs ==
=== Wild card ===
Team	1	2	3	4	Total
• Falcons	0	10	7	10	27
Saints	7	6	0	7	20

- Date: December 28
- Location: Louisiana Superdome
- Game start: 3:00 p.m. CST
- Game weather: Indoors (dome)
- Referee: Howard Roe
- TV announcers (ABC): Al Michaels, Frank Gifford, and Dan Dierdorf

Falcons quarterback Chris Miller completed the game-winning 61-yard touchdown pass to Michael Haynes with 2:41 left in the contest. Miller completed 18 out of 30 passes for 291 yards and 3 touchdowns.

=== Divisional ===
Team	1	2	3	4	Total
Falcons	0	7	0	0	7
• Redskins	0	14	3	7	24

- Date: January 4
- Location: RFK Stadium
- Game start: 12:30 p.m. EST
- Game weather: Rain; 49 °F or 9.4 °C
- Referee: Red Cashion
- TV announcers (CBS): Verne Lundquist and Dan Fouts

During their regular season meeting, Washington defeated Atlanta 56–17, with quarterback Mark Rypien throwing for 446 yards and 6 touchdowns. In this game the score was closer, but the result was still the same.

Under rainy and muddy conditions, the Redskins forced six turnovers, held the ball for over 36 minutes, and scored two touchdowns in a span of 3:11 in the second quarter.
