= Buccaneers–Falcons rivalry =

National Football League rivalry

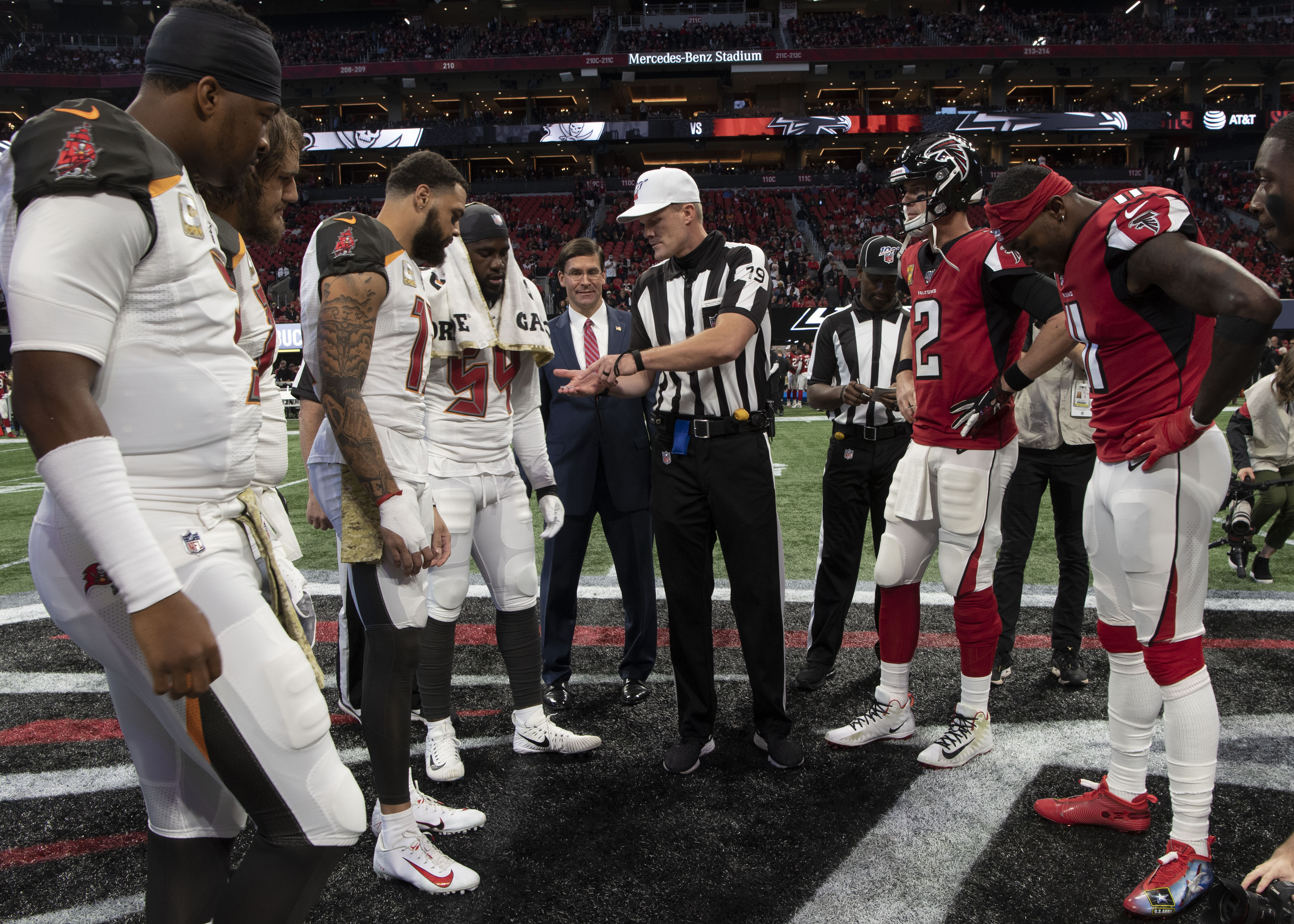
- Buccaneers players and Falcons players meet for a coin toss at midfield during a game played at Mercedes-Benz Stadium in Atlanta during the 2019 NFL season.

- Tampa Bay Buccaneers Atlanta Falcons
- Location: Tampa, Atlanta
- First meeting: November 27, 1977; Falcons 17, Buccaneers 0.
- Latest meeting: November 1, 2026; Buccaneers 16, Falcons 0
- Next meeting: December 26/27, 2026
- Stadiums: Buccaneers: Raymond James Stadium; Falcons: Mercedes-Benz Stadium

Statistics
- Total meetings: 66
- All-time series: Tied: 33–33
- Largest victory: Buccaneers: 48–10 (1987); Falcons: 56–14 (2014)
- Most points scored: Buccaneers: 48 (1987), (2021); Falcons: 56 (2014)
- Longest win streak: Buccaneers: 6 (1997–2003); Falcons: 5 (2008–2010, 2016–2018)
- Current win streak: Buccaneers: 1 (2026–present)
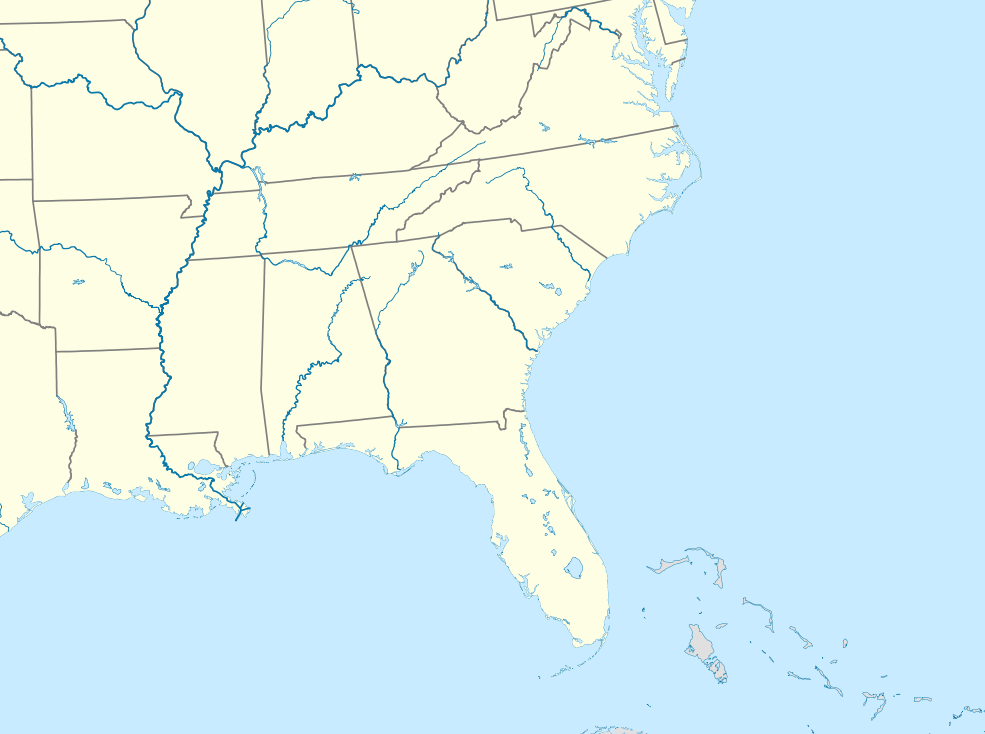

The Buccaneers–Falcons rivalry is a National Football League (NFL) rivalry between the Tampa Bay Buccaneers and Atlanta Falcons.

The two teams met for the first time in 1977, one year after the Buccaneers joined the NFL as the newest expansion team. However, the rivalry did not develop until 2002, when the Buccaneers and Falcons were placed in the newly formed NFC South division, resulting in two meetings annually. During the 2000s, the rivalry between the Falcons and Buccaneers reached its pinnacle, as they frequently battled for the divisional title. However, since then, both teams have faced challenges in maintaining their competitiveness simultaneously. They have experienced fleeting periods of dominance over each other, often influenced by the performance of their respective quarterbacks.

The rivalry is recognized for its closely contested history, with neither team ever holding a lead of more than 5 wins over the other throughout the overall series. Both teams are also known for their aggressive playing styles, with hard-hitting defenses that often result in injuries and penalties. It has also been nicknamed as the I-75 rivalry due to Atlanta and Tampa being along Interstate 75 (I-75).

The overall series is tied, 33–33. The two teams have not met in the playoffs.

== Background ==
=== Atlanta Falcons (1966–1976) ===
The Atlanta Falcons were founded by Rankin M. Smith Sr. and started playing in the NFL in the 1966 season. In their initial years, the Falcons struggled, achieving only two winning seasons and failing to qualify for the playoffs. As part of the AFL–NFL merger, the Falcons were placed in the National Football Conference (NFC) and the NFC West starting in the 1970 season.

=== Tampa Bay Buccaneers (1976) ===
The Tampa Bay Buccaneers were founded by Hugh Culverhouse and began playing in the NFL in the 1976 season. The Buccaneers suffered from primarily having to acquire players through an expansion draft and claims on the waiver wire, with most of the newly acquired players being made up of aging veterans. The Buccaneers became the first team ever to lose every game in a 14-game season, being led by a historically bad offense. As part of the AFL–NFL merger, the Buccaneers and the Seattle Seahawks, the other expansion team, switched conferences the following season. The Seahawks joined the American Football Conference (AFC), while the Buccaneers became part of the NFC alongside the Falcons. However, the Buccaneers were assigned to the NFC Central instead of the NFC West, where the Falcons were located.

== 1977–1981: Beginning matchups ==
In the 1977 season on November 27 in Atlanta, the Falcons and the Buccaneers faced each other for the first time. The Falcons were led by their outstanding defense, famously known as "Grits Blitz." This defense achieved a remarkable feat by setting an enduring NFL record for allowing the fewest points in a 14-game season. Contrarily, the Buccaneers continued to struggle heavily and remained in search of their first victory as a franchise, having endured 24 straight losses since the previous season. Their struggling offense has ranked at the bottom for points scored, recorded the fewest throwing touchdowns, and was shut out in four games this season. The Falcons' renowned defense effortlessly handled the Buccaneers' ineffective offense. The Buccaneers' offense could only manage a mere 78 total yards, never crossed Atlanta's 35-yard line, committed 5 turnovers, and were shut out for the fifth time that season. Buccaneers coach at the time, John McKay, described their performance as "our worst effort in two years". Despite the Falcons' strong defense, their struggling offense prevented them from making it to their first playoff appearance, finishing the season with a 7-7 record. It took the Buccaneers two more games to finally secure their first franchise win, defeating the New Orleans Saints 33-14.

They met again for their second time in Tampa on September 24 during the 1978 NFL season. The Falcons' defense dominated the Buccaneers in the first half, allowing no first downs and only one pass completion while also forcing a safety. Despite the defensive effort, the Falcons' offense struggled again as they were shut out in the first half as the Buccaneers took a 7–2 lead at halftime due to a 79–yard return of a blocked field goal by CB Mike Washington. In the 3rd quarter, The Falcons finally scored a touchdown, but the Buccaneers finally broke through the Falcons' defense for a game-winning touchdown drive, winning 14-9 and earning their first victory against the Falcons. Even with the loss, the Falcons would later make their first-ever franchise playoff appearance.

Their first matchup in Atlanta took place on November 4 during the 1979 season. After taking an early lead with a touchdown, the Falcons' defense dominated as they shut out the Buccaneers for the majority of the game. Nonetheless, the Falcons' offense continued to struggle and could only achieve a mere field goal. Eventually, the Falcons managed to score two touchdowns in the 4th quarter. Although the Buccaneers scored a late touchdown drive, they failed to recover the onside kick, leading to a 17-14 victory for the Falcons.

In the 1981 season, both teams entered their matchup in Tampa on December 6 with identical 7-6 records and vying for a spot in the playoffs. In the fourth quarter, Buccaneers' QB Doug Williams found WR Kevin House, who sprinted 71 yards for a touchdown, putting the Buccaneers ahead. In the final minute, the Falcons advanced into Buccaneers territory, but K Mick Luckhurst missed a game-winning 45–yard field goal, resulting in a 24–23 win for the Buccaneers. The Buccaneers went on to clinch their division and qualify for the playoffs, in contrast to the Falcons who closed out the season with a three-game losing streak and missed out on the playoffs.

== 1982–1990: Mediocrity and no playoff appearances ==
For nearly a decade, both teams failed to qualify for the playoffs, the only exception being the shortened players' strike 1982 NFL season.

In the matchup on September 28 in Tampa during the 1986 season, the Falcons rallied from a 20–7 halftime deficit to send the game into overtime, in which they won on a game-winning 34–yard field goal to complete the comeback and win 23–20.

=== 1987: Buccaneers blowout ===
In the 1987 season opener, the Buccaneers dominated the Falcons in a 48-10 victory, their largest victory over the Falcons with a 38–point differential. This also set a franchise record for their largest victory until it was surpassed by a 41–point margin against the Chicago Bears in the 2000 season. The Buccaneers also scored their most points in a game against the Falcons, while also setting a franchise record for most points scored in a game. This record remained intact until it was broken when they scored 55 points against the Los Angeles Rams in the 2019 season. QB Steve DeBerg completed 24-of-34, throwing for 333 yards and five touchdowns, becoming the first Buccaneers QB to throw for 5 touchdowns in a game. The Buccaneers finished with a 460-197 total yard edge.

== 1990s: Return to relevancy ==
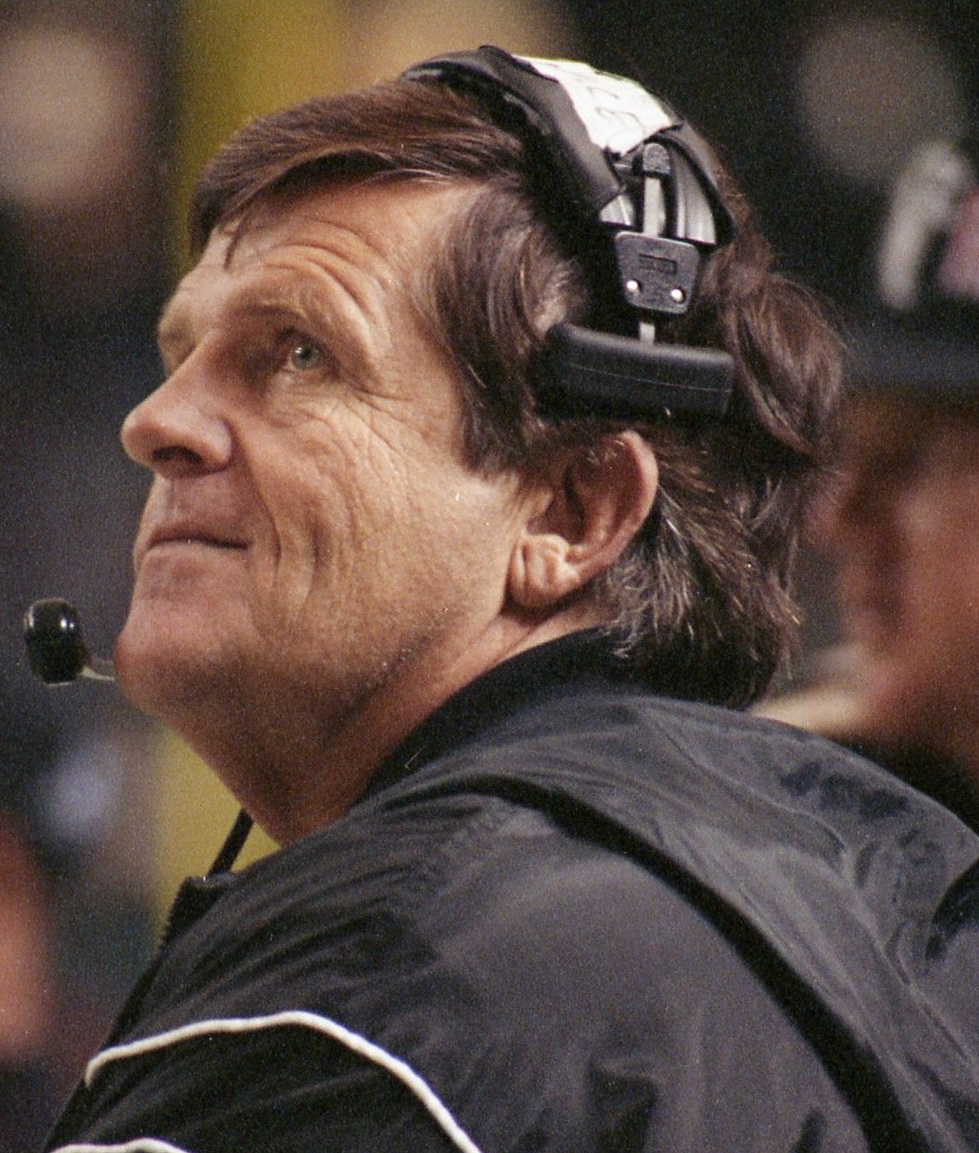
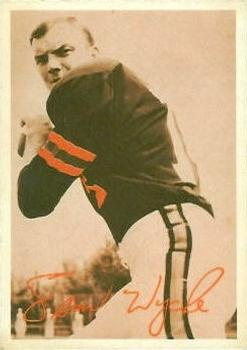
Jerry Glanville (left) and Sam Wyche (right) briefly clashed during their time as head coaches of the Falcons and Buccaneers.

In the 1991 season, the Falcons dominated the Buccaneers with a 43-7 victory on November 17 in what would be their final matchup at the Atlanta-Fulton County Stadium, as the Falcons moved to the Georgia Dome for the following season. After nearly a decade, the Falcons returned to the playoffs.

The Falcons secured another dominant victory against the Buccaneers with a 35–7 score in Tampa on December 13 during the 1992 NFL season. QB Wade Wilson became the first Falcons quarterback to throw for five touchdown passes in a game. Despite neither team being in playoff contention, this game stood out due to the ongoing feud between former Houston Oilers coach Jerry Glanville and former Cincinnati Bengals coach Sam Wyche, who currently serve as head coaches for the Falcons and Buccaneers, respectively. Once the Falcons had a commanding lead, Glanville had Wilson throw a touchdown to CB Deion Sanders. Additionally, he granted LB Jesse Solomon, who had been cut by Wyche and the Bucs in the preseason, the opportunity to carry the ball twice on the final drive.

The 1993 season saw the Buccaneers record their first win in Atlanta on October 31. Buccaneers QB Craig Erickson threw for four touchdowns as the Buccaneers built up a commanding 31-3 lead by the end of the 3rd quarter. Although the Falcons tried to mount a comeback, Buccaneers' DE Chidi Ahanotu deflected a pass during a 4th-and-1 play at Tampa's 9-yard line, ultimately clinching a 31–24 win for the Buccaneers. Following another disappointing season, the Falcons fired Jerry Glanville.

During the 1995 season, the Buccaneers and Falcons clashed in Tampa on October 22, with both enjoying strong starts to the season and in the playoff mix. Against the league's second-best ranked defense that had not permitted opponents to score more than two touchdowns in a game so far, QB Jeff George recovered from an early pick-six to throw for three touchdown passes and three passes of 30+ yards in a closely contested game, guiding the Falcons to a 24–21 win and ending the Buccaneers' four-game winning streak. This was their last matchup at the Tampa Stadium, as the Buccaners would move to the Raymond James Stadium in the 1998 season. The Falcons would go on to make the playoffs. The Buccaneers' season took a turn after the game, as they went 2-6 the rest of the way, ultimately resulting in the firing of Sam Wyche.

In the 1997 season, the Buccaneers defeated the Falcons 31–10 on November 9 in Atlanta. The win helped the Buccaneers return to the playoffs for the first time since the 1982 season.

Following a devastating loss in their inaugural Super Bowl appearance against the Denver Broncos in Super Bowl XXXIII, the Falcons began the 1999 NFL season with high hopes of redemption. Unfortunately, injuries to key players dashed those hopes, leading to a lackluster 2-7 record when they faced the Buccaneers on November 21 in their first matchup at the Raymond James Stadium. The Falcons jumped out to a 10–0 lead but were shut out for the rest of the game. Despite not scoring any touchdowns, the Buccaneers relied on four field goals made by rookie K "Automatica" Martín Gramática to take the lead. In the final seconds, a pick-six by the Falcons gave the Buccaneers a 19–10 victory. The Falcons continued to struggle throughout the season, finishing with a disappointing 5-11 record. In contrast, the Buccaneers clinched a playoff spot.

== 2002–2007: The start of a new divisional rivalry ==
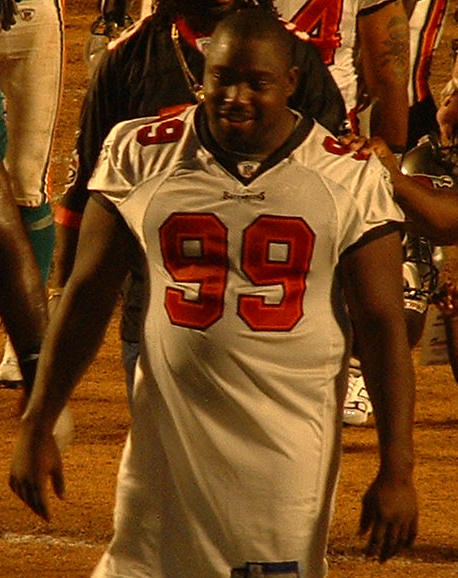
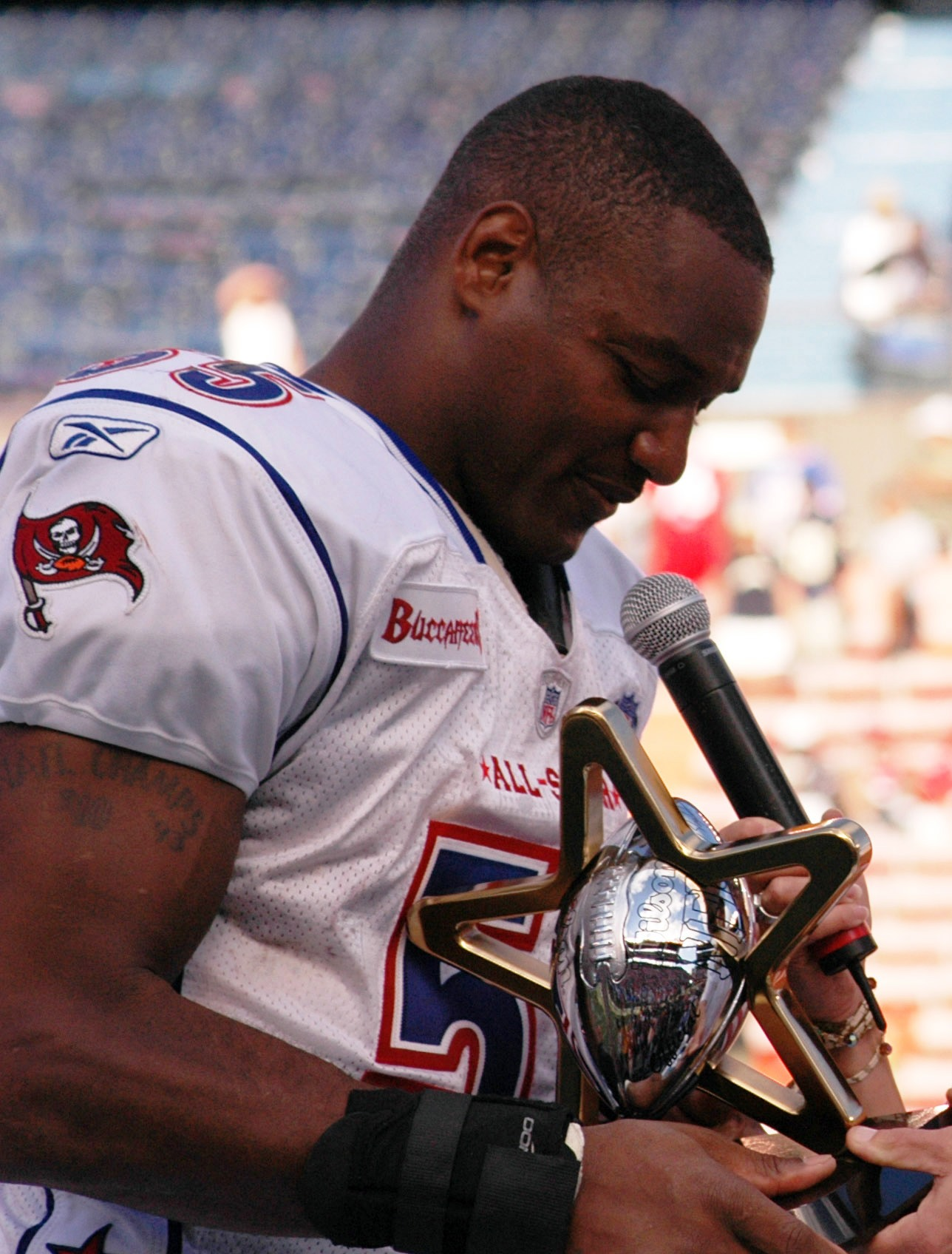
The Buccaneers defense, which included future hall of famers Warren Sapp (left) and Derrick Brooks (right), presented numerous challenges for the Falcons and played a crucial role in the team's success and Super Bowl Championship.

=== NFC South formation ===
In the 2002 season, the NFL realigned its teams into eight divisions: four teams in each division and four divisions in each conference. The Tampa Bay Buccaneers and Atlanta Falcons were relocated from the NFC Central and NFC West respectively to the newly established NFC South, alongside the New Orleans Saints and Carolina Panthers. Consequently, the Buccaneers and Falcons were scheduled to face each other twice annually: once in Tampa and once in Atlanta.

=== 2002–2003: First matchups as divisional rivals ===
The Buccaneers and Falcons faced off for the first time as divisional rivals on October 6 in Atlanta. In a low-scoring battle, the Falcons suffered a setback when QB Michael Vick was injured after being sacked by DE Simeon Rice. QB Doug Johnson took over for the remainder of the game. In a 3-and-6 situation from their own 24-yard line, Buccaneers QB Brad Johnson connected with WR Keyshawn Johnson, who then ran for a 76-yard touchdown. Another pivotal play occurred when DT Warren Sapp, while being brought down by OT Todd Weiner after catching an interception, threw a lateral pass to LB Derrick Brooks, who ran it back for a touchdown. the Buccaneers ultimately won 20-6. Early in the game, Sapp complained to the officials that Vick was performing a head-bobbing motion that was causing the defense to jump offside. Following his observation, the officials started penalizing Vick for false starts. Additionally, Sapp could be seen taunting the sold-out Georgia Dome crowd during timeouts, walking up and down the line of scrimmage and flapping his arms. After the game, Sapp was quoted saying "We have some deadly bullets on this team. And we are going out shooting right now. Coach says there should be an investigation because it looks like there are twelve of us out there right now."

Both teams were vying for the first NFC South title when they faced off once again on December 8 in Tampa. The Buccaneers, boasting a 9-3 record, were led by their historic top-ranked defense in the league, which introduced an innovative defensive tactic later dubbed the "Tampa 2". The Falcons overcame their slow start and won their next seven games, including a tie against the Pittsburgh Steelers, with Michael Vick showcasing impressive performances as they held an 8-3-1 record. In a highly anticipated rematch, which garnered such attention that NFL Commissioner Paul Tagliabue himself decided to attend, the Buccaneers emerged victorious in a dominant fashion as their defense controlled the game throughout. Michael Vick, who entered the game amidst much hype, was sacked twice by the Buccaneers' defense and limited to 12-of-25, 125 passing yards, and 9 rushing yards on 6 carries. On the other side, Brad Johnson threw for 276 yards and four touchdown passes as the Buccaneers outperformed the Falcons in total yardage by a significant margin, 421–181. The Buccaneers won 34-10, putting an end to the Falcons' unbeaten streak and sweeping them in their first season series as divisional rivals.

The Buccaneers clinched the inaugural NFC South title after the Saints lost to the Bengals. The Falcons, despite being swept and losing their final game of the season, clinched the 6th seed due to the Saints' loss against the Panthers. This would be the first, and as of November 4, 2026, only time both teams made the playoffs in the same season. During the playoffs, the Falcons pulled off a surprising win against the heavily favored Green Bay Packers but fell to the Philadelphia Eagles. The Buccaneers defeated the San Francisco 49ers and the Eagles to clinch their first Super Bowl appearance. In Super Bowl XXXVII, the Buccaneers defeated the Oakland Raiders for their first Super Bowl Championship.

The Buccaneers entered the 2003 season defending their Super Bowl Title. They met the Falcons in Atlanta on September 21, where they continued from where they left off and routed them 31-10. The Buccaneers' defense swarmed Doug Johnson, filled in as quarterback for the Falcons after Michael Vick suffered a fractured right fibula in a preseason game, and limited him to 95 passing yards and 3 interceptions. The game even featured Warren Sapp, playing as a Tight end, catching a touchdown pass for his first offensive touchdown in his career. With this win, the Buccaneers extended their winning streak against the Falcons to six games, the longest streak in the series for either team.

On December 20, when the two teams faced off once more in Tampa, the Buccaneers were in a state of disarray. With aspirations of defending their Super Bowl championship, they had been plagued by internal strife, various issues, and injuries, resulting in a disappointing 7-7 record before this game. To maintain their faint playoff hopes, the Buccaneers required a win against the already-eliminated Falcons. The Buccaneers delivered yet another dismal performance, with Brad Johnson throwing 4 interceptions in the first half. Despite coming off a fibula injury and a subpar showing against the Indianapolis Colts, Michael Vick overcame the once formidable Buccaneers' defense and converted the turnovers into points. By halftime, the Buccaneers were trailing 27-7, and fans can be heard booing them as they went into the locker room. A Falcons field goal extended their lead to 30-7 heading into the 4th quarter. The Buccaneers began to mount a comeback as Johnson connected on touchdown passes, and they successfully recovered an onside kick that resulted in another touchdown, narrowing their deficit to just two points with 23 seconds left on the clock. Yet, in line with the narrative of their season, they fell short when DE Travis Hall deflected the two-point conversion, resulting in a devastating 30-28 loss. With this victory, the Falcons put an end to their 6-game losing streak against the Buccaneers and eliminated them from playoff contention.

==== Rich McKay ====
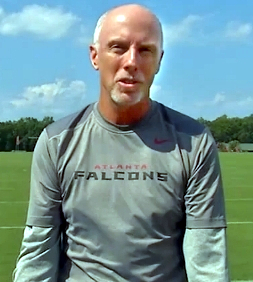
Rich McKay played a pivotal role in the Buccaneers' success and Super Bowl Championship. Nevertheless, due to internal conflicts, he departed from the team and transitioned to the Falcons organization on December 15, 2003. Presently, he continues to be associated with the Falcons organization and drafted players who excel against the Buccaneers.

Rich McKay, who has been a part of the Buccaneers organization since 1992, is the son of John McKay, the team's first head coach. In 1994, Rich McKay was promoted to the position of general manager. Throughout his time as general manager, McKay selected future hall-of-fame athletes like Warren Sapp, Derrick Brooks, and Ronde Barber, and assembled the 2002 Buccaneers' Super Bowl-winning team which included seven Pro Bowl players.

Despite achieving success, his association with the Buccaneers began to deteriorate. He frequently clashed with Jon Gruden, who was not his preferred successor to Tony Dungy, despite winning the Super Bowl together. They allegedly had a strained relationship due to conflicting visions on team management. Ultimately, this led to McKay and the Buccaneers organization coming to a mutual agreement that enabled him to leave and explore new positions with other teams.

On December 15, 2003, just five days before the matchup in Tampa, Rich McKay and the Falcons mutually agreed for him to assume the role of their new general manager. After the Falcons defeated the Buccaneers, McKay expressed his struggle with cheering against his former team, saying "I've rooted for them for a long time as individuals, and it's hard to watch them and then root against them. That's very hard, but it happens in free agency, too."

During McKay's tenure, the Falcons have been to the playoffs seven times, been to three NFC Championship games, and participated in a Super Bowl. Meanwhile, the Buccaneers would only make the playoffs two times from 2003–2019, losing both games.

=== 2004–2005: Buccaneers record shutout, showdown for divisional title ===
In the 2004 season, the Buccaneers recorded their first shutout over the Falcons in Tampa on December 5 in an upset. Despite the Falcons having the better record, Vick struggled, finishing with 13-of-27 for 115 yards, fumbling twice, getting sacked five times, and throwing two interceptions, both at the Buccaneers 1-yard line.

In the 2005 season, the Buccaneers and Falcons were vying for the division title when they met in Atlanta on November 20. Both teams held 6–3 records and were one game behind the division-leading Panthers. The Buccaneers jumped out to a 13-0 lead, but the Falcons mounted a comeback, led by Vick's five consecutive scoring possessions, leading to a competitive exchange between the two teams that culminated in a 27–27 tie with just two minutes remaining in the game. Following a touchdown by the Buccaneers, the Falcons regained possession. However, in a pivotal defensive play, Derrick Brooks leaped over RB Warrick Dunn's block attempt and sacked Vick at Atlanta's 34-yard line, causing a fumble that was recovered by LB Shelton Quarles. Four plays later, K Matt Bryant kicked a 45-yard field goal to give the Buccaneers a 30-27 lead with 42 seconds left. In a last-ditch effort, Vick positioned his team for a field goal within Tampa's 37-yard line. However, K Michael Koenen's 55-yard field goal attempt veered wide right, securing a thrilling 30-27 victory for the Buccaneers. Vick finished with 21-of-38 passes for 306 yards and two touchdowns. Notably, Vick outgained the Buccaneers as a whole, as they only mustered 256 yards on offense. Following the game, Buccaneers' CB Ronde Barber commented on the intense rivalry, stating "Two equally matched teams. There's big plays all over the field when we two play each other."

The Buccaneers and the Falcons clashed once again on December 24 in Atlanta. Both teams were vying for playoff berths, with the Buccaneers holding a 9-5 record and the Falcons standing at 8-6. The Buccaneers were determined to retain their lead in the NFC South, while the Falcons were desperate for a victory to keep their playoff aspirations alive. In a thrilling and closely contested match, the game extended into overtime after both teams ended regulation tied at 24–24. In overtime, the Buccaneers won the coin toss and opted to receive. However, during the kickoff, WR Edell Shepherd was tackled and lost possession of the ball, which was then recovered by DB Ronnie Heard at Tampa's 18-yard line. the Falcons ran twice to set up a 28-yard field goal opportunity for K Todd Peterson at Tampa's 10-yard line. In what would have been a game-winning field goal, Peterson's kick was blocked by DE Dewayne White. Seizing the opportunity, the Buccaneers marched down to set up a potential game-winning 27-yard field goal by Bryant at Atlanta's 9-yard line. However, Bryant's kick veered wide right, resulting in both teams missing their chances at securing victory with field goals. Both teams exchanged punts until the Buccaneers got the ball at Atlanta's 49-yard line with 54 seconds remaining in overtime. QB Chris Simms drove his team down to Atlanta's 23-yard line to set up a 41-yard field goal attempt. Bryant redeemed himself by successfully making the field goal, ultimately leading the Buccaneers to a 27-24 overtime thriller victory. With the loss, the Falcons were swept by the Buccaneers, and officially eliminated from playoff contention. Subsequently, the Buccaneers would go on to clinch the NFC South after beating the Saints in the season finale.

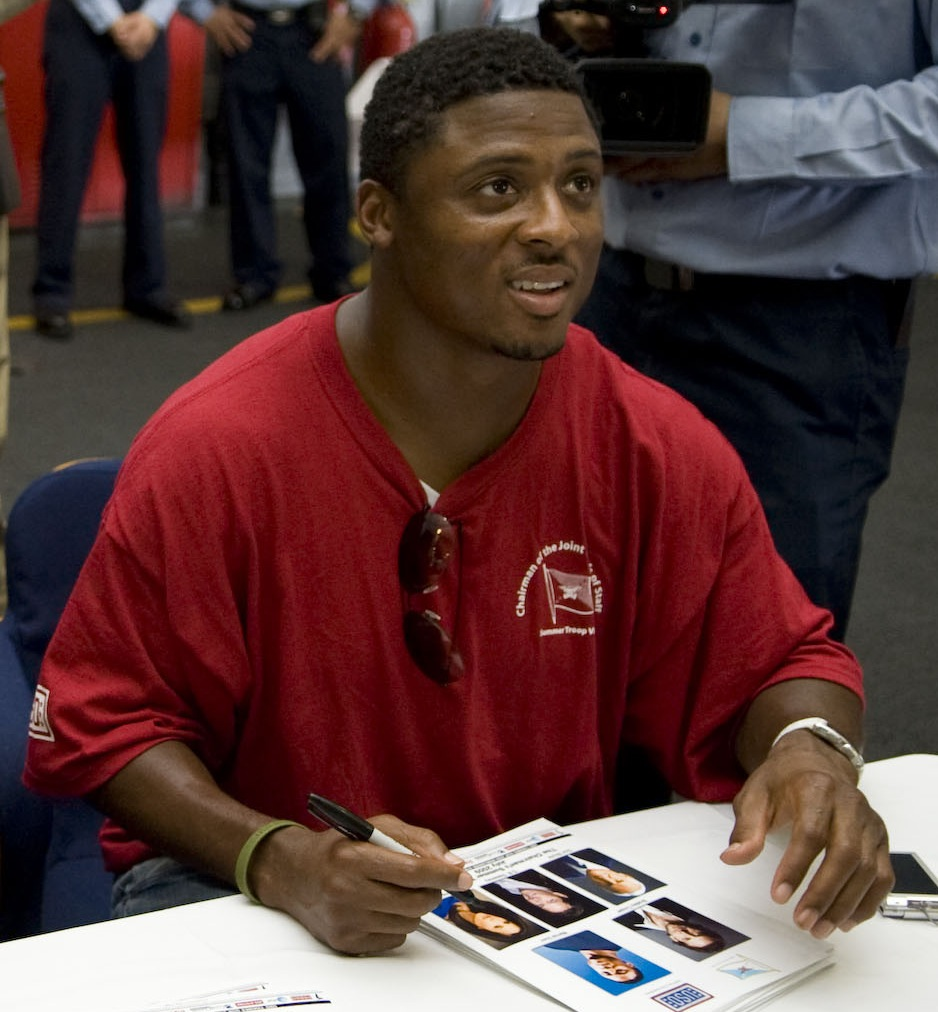
RB Warrick Dunn spent his entire playing career with the Buccaneers and Falcons, playing 6 seasons for both of them

=== 2006–2007: Falcons first sweep and final Michael Vick season ===
In the 2006 season, the Falcons met the Buccaneers in Tampa on September 17. Despite the Buccaneers' defense being ranked #1 the previous season, they couldn't stop Michael Vick and Warrick Dunn, who rushed for 127 and 134 yards on the ground respectively, as the Falcons won 14–3 in a defensive battle. The Falcons finished with 306 rushing yards, which was a franchise record until it was broken two years later against the Detroit Lions. Additionally, this also set a franchise record for most rushing yards in a game allowed by the Buccaneers.

In the rematch in Atlanta on December 10, the Buccaneers struggled again. After taking a 6–0 lead, they would be shut out the rest of the game, leading to a 17–6 Falcons' victory, who achieved their first season sweep over the Buccaneers. With the loss, the Buccaneers were officially eliminated from playoff contention and finished the season going winless in their division, going 0-6, just a year after winning the NFC South.

This was the last season Michael Vick played for the Falcons, after which he pleaded guilty to his role in the Bad Newz Kennels dog fighting investigation. Subsequently, he was suspended indefinitely and eventually released by the Falcons. Vick finished with a 4-5 record against the Buccaneers. During his time with the Falcons, Michael Vick earned numerous Pro Bowl selections and guided the Falcons to two playoff appearances. However, he often struggled against the Buccaneers' defense.

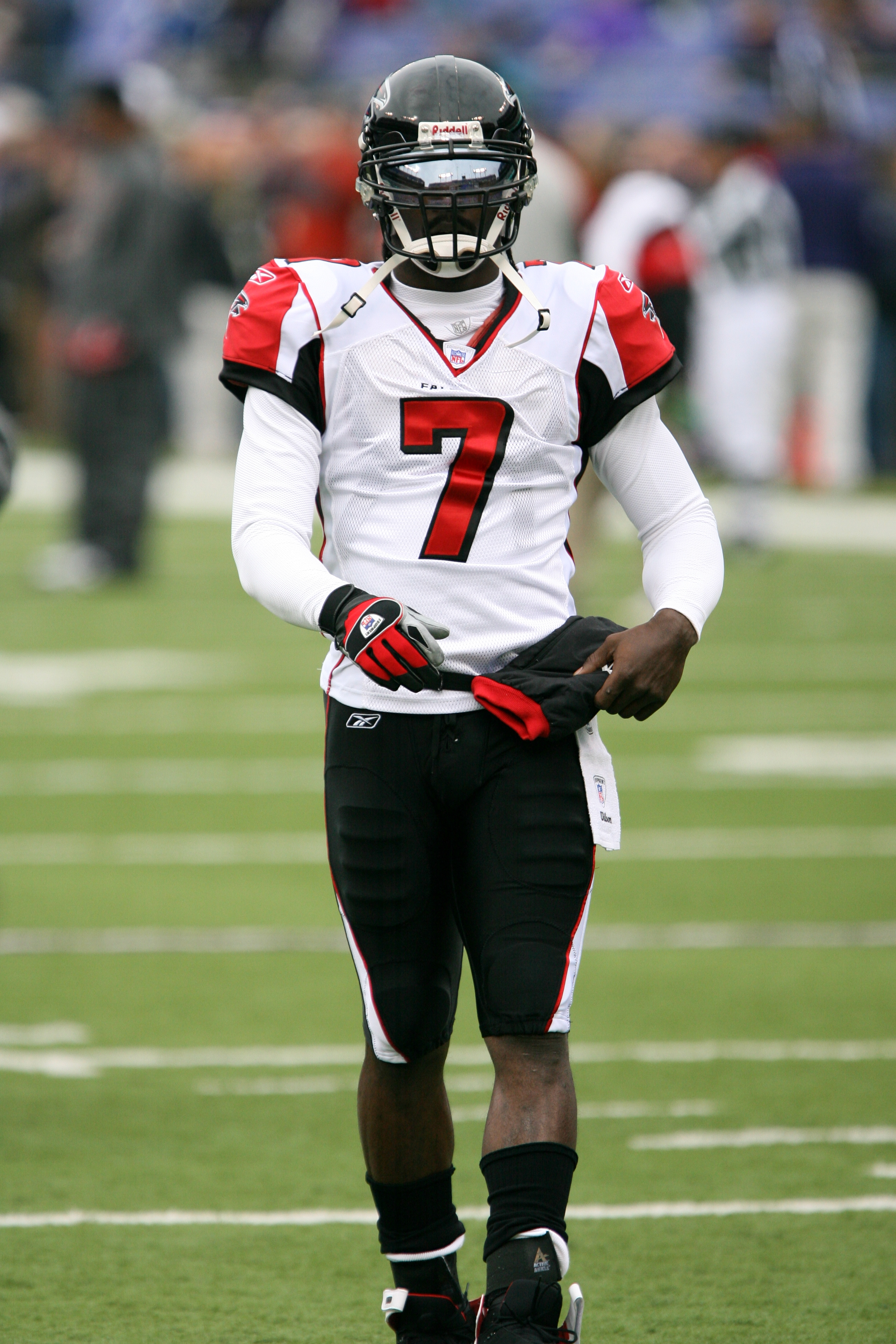
Despite earning multiple Pro Bowl selections and guiding the Falcons to two playoff appearances, QB Michael Vick had some of his worst performances when facing the Buccaneers' defense.

Being led by journeymen quarterbacks in the 2007 season, the Falcons were easily swept by the Buccaneers as both games resulted in blowout losses. In their matchup on December 16 in Tampa, Falcons QB Chris Redman finished with 4–of–15 for 34 yards, two interceptions and a fumble, posting a passer rating of 0.0 in the process. Additionally, a memorable moment from that game was when WR Micheal Spurlock etched his name in history as the first Buccaneer to score a touchdown on a kickoff return. Following a Falcons field goal, they kicked off to Spurlock at Tampa's 10-yard line. With exceptional blocking from the Buccaneers' special teams, Spurlock found a gap and sprinted 90 yards to secure the team's first-ever touchdown return after 32 seasons and 1,865 attempts. With their win, the Buccaneers clinched the NFC South and swept the Falcons for the third time.

== 2008–2019: Matt Ryan and Julio Jones take over ==
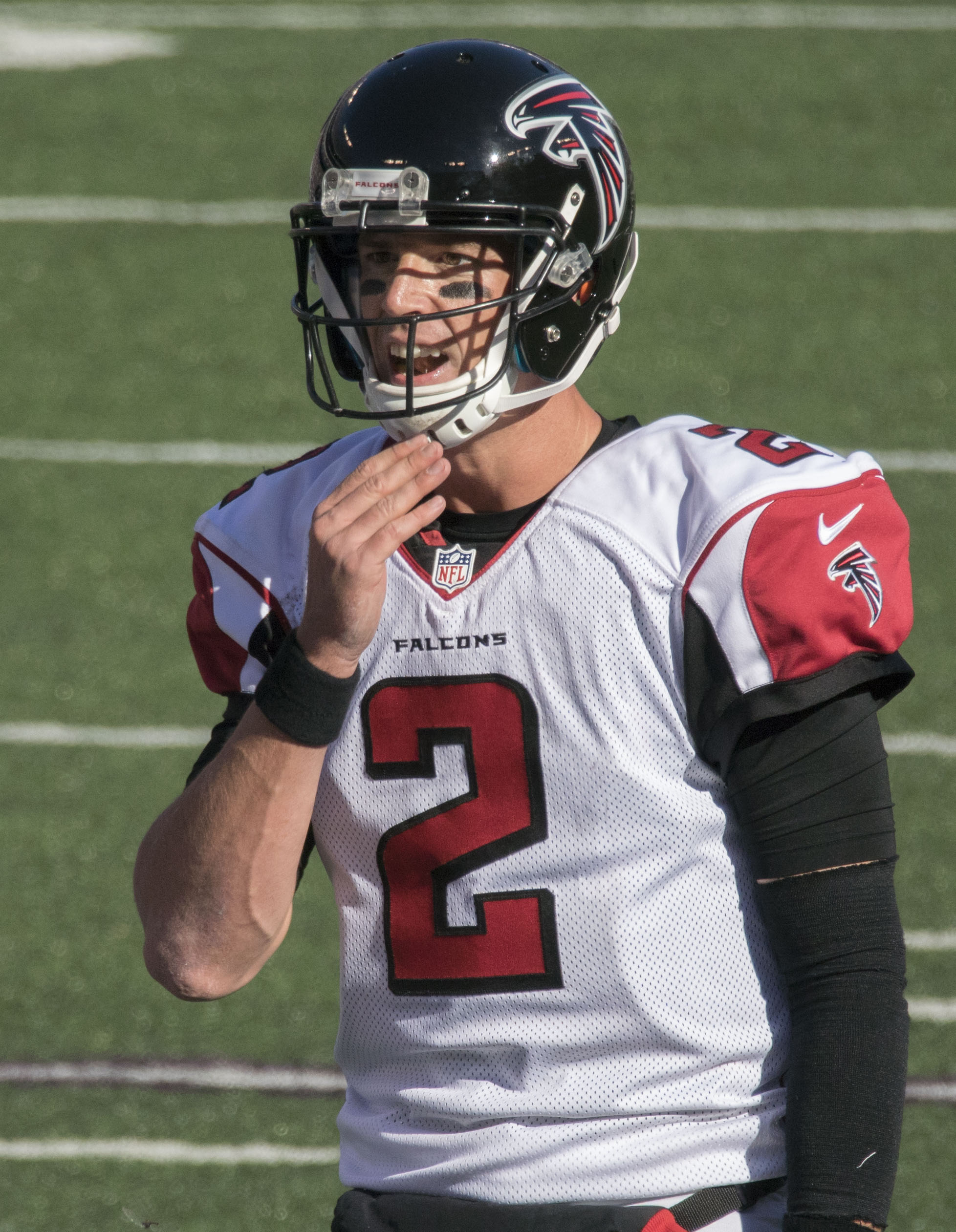
QB Matt Ryan was drafted by the Falcons in 2008 and played a crucial role in tilting the rivalry in favor of the Falcons.

=== 2008–2010: Matt Ryan debuts ===
In the 2008 season, newly drafted Falcons QB Matt Ryan made his debut against the Buccaneers in Tampa on September 14. Ryan struggled against the Buccaneers defense, as they forced two interceptions, four sacks, incompletions on his first nine passes, and three field goal drives, as the Buccaneers won 24–9. Matt Ryan finished with 13-of-33 for 158 yards, no touchdowns, and two interceptions. Warrick Dunn, a former Falcons RB now playing for the Buccaneers, finished with 49 yards on 12 carries and one touchdown.

The Falcons and Buccaneers clashed in Atlanta on December 14, battling for a playoff berth. Despite low expectations for the Falcons, they boasted an impressive 8-5 record under rookie HC Mike Smith and Matt Ryan. On the other hand, the Buccaneers were 9-4 and aiming to retain their NFC South lead. The Falcons established an early 10–0 lead but remained scoreless for most of the game. The Buccaneers were unable to capitalize on this opportunity; however, in the final minutes, a blocked punt by the Buccaneers led to a 38–yard field goal that tied the score, sending the game into overtime. In overtime, the Buccaneers punted, and Matt Ryan and RB Michael Turner moved the Falcons 55 yards down the field, culminating in a game-winning 34-yard field goal for a 13–10 Falcons victory. Following their victory, the Falcons went on to make the playoffs, whereas the Buccaneers ended the season with a four-game losing streak, resulting in them not qualifying for the playoffs.

In their matchup in Atlanta on November 29 during the 2009 season, the Falcons faced a challenging situation when key offensive players like Matt Ryan and Michael Turner had to leave the game due to injuries. Despite the injuries, backup Chris Redman skillfully orchestrated a game-winning 59-yard drive with 26 seconds left on the clock, leading the Falcons to a 20–17 victory. After previously posting a 0.0 passer rating against the Buccaneers, Redman redeemed himself with his performance, completing 23-of-41 for 243 yards and 2 touchdown passes. The Buccaneers' loss in this game officially ended their playoff hopes. The Falcons swept the Buccaneers in their first ever season finale matchup in Tampa with a 20-10 win. Despite not qualifying for the playoffs, this win marked the first instance of back-to-back winning seasons in Falcons' history.

Both teams had identical records of 5-2 when they clashed in Atlanta on November 7 in the 2010 season. Near the end of the 3rd quarter, Michael Spurlock, who had previously given the Buccaneers their first franchise kickoff touchdown against the Falcons, returned an 89-yard kickoff for a touchdown for the second time in his career, narrowing the score to 27-21. In the final minutes, the Buccaneers faced a 4th-and-1 situation at Atlanta's 2-yard line, but their attempt was stuffed, and the Falcons held on to a 27–21 victory, claiming sole possession of first place in the NFC South.

They met again in Tampa on December 5, where the Falcons, leading the NFC with a 9-2 record, faced off against the Buccaneers, who held a 7-4 record. By the start of the 4th quarter, the Buccaneers took a 24–14 lead. However, their momentum was quickly halted when WR Eric Weems returned the subsequent kickoff for a 102-yard touchdown run. Following this, Ryan connected on a touchdown pass, giving the Falcons the lead. The Buccaneers' final drive ended with an interception, and the Falcons ran down the clock for a 28–24 comeback victory. The Falcons increased their winning streak against the Buccaneers to five games.

The Falcons concluded the season with a 13-3 record, winners of the NFC South and securing the top seed in the NFC. On the other hand, the Buccaneers finished the season with a 10-6 record, tying with the Packers and New York Giants for the final 6th seed. However, the Packers secured their spot in the playoffs due to a superior strength of victory (.475) compared to the Giants (.400) and Buccaneers (.344), ultimately eliminating both teams. The Packers went on to shock the Falcons in the playoffs and ultimately win Super Bowl XLV.

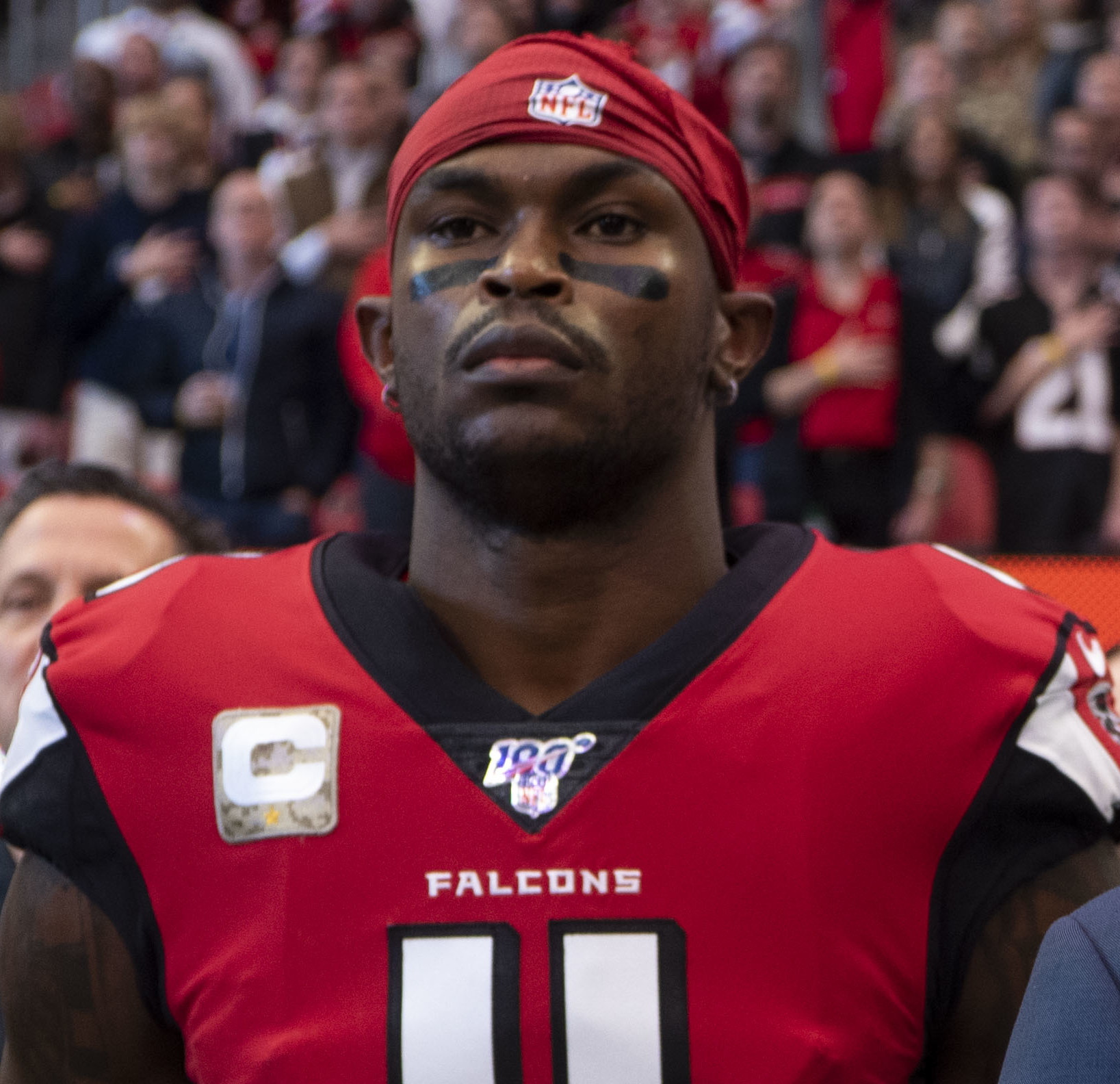
WR Julio Jones had standout performances against the Buccaneers throughout his career. He eventually signed with the Buccaneers for the 2022 season.

=== 2011: Julio Jones debuts ===
In the 2011 season, the Buccaneers faced off against the Falcons in Tampa on September 25. After leading an 80-yard touchdown drive, Buccaneers' QB Josh Freeman celebrated by mimicking Atlanta's famous "Dirty Bird" dance by flapping his arms. The Buccaneers took a 16-3 lead heading into the 4th quarter, while the Falcons attempted a comeback. Facing a 4th-and-1, the Buccaneers planned on punting. However, Falcons’ DT Corey Peters flinched on the hard count, granting the Buccaneers a fresh set of downs and allowed them to run down the clock for a 16–13 victory, breaking their 5-game losing streak against the Falcons. In his debut in the rivalry, newly drafted WR Julio Jones recorded his first 100-yard game and accumulated 115 yards on six receptions. Ronde Barber expressed his satisfaction with the win, stating, “These guys have really been a thorn in our side. We've lost too many games like this one to them the last few years. It was nice to finally beat them.” Freeman added "It's huge, and it's about time one went our way. They've been really close games since I've been here. They're a great divisional opponent.”

The Falcons sought redemption when they faced off again in the season finale in Atlanta on January 1. After suffering a devastating 45-16 defeat against the Saints, the Falcons unleashed their frustration on the struggling Buccaneers, who entered the matchup with a nine-game losing streak. Despite already securing a playoff spot, the Falcons swiftly established a commanding 42-0 lead by the middle of the 2nd quarter, highlighted by Jones scoring two touchdowns in just 26 seconds. The game ended with a 45–24 Falcons victory, clinching them the 5th seed in the playoffs and extending the Buccaneers losing streak to 10 games.

=== 2012–2013: Falcons begin to dominate the rivalry ===
During the 2012 season, the NFC-leading Falcons faced off against the Buccaneers, who were on a four-game winning streak, in Tampa on November 25. In the fourth quarter, trailing by 6 points, Matt Ryan orchestrated a game-winning touchdown drive for the Falcons, securing a 1-point lead with about 8 minutes left on the clock. On the Buccaneers' final drive, they missed a 56-yard field goal, and the Falcons held on for a 24–23 victory. Ryan threw for 353 yards and started the game with 10 straight completions, while Jones caught six passes for 147 yards, including catching an 80-yard touchdown pass. This win helped the Falcons maintain their top spot in the NFC and ended the Buccaneers' winning streak. The Falcons would go on to the playoffs, whereas the Buccaneers suffered a five-game losing streak and missed the playoffs.

=== 2014: Falcons blowout ===
In the 2014 season, the Falcons faced off against the Buccaneers in Atlanta on September 18 for a Thursday Night Football matchup. During a Buccaneers punt, return specialist Devin Hester grabbed the ball near midfield and sprinted past the Buccaneers special team for a touchdown, setting a new NFL record for most career return touchdowns with 20. This broke the previous record he held with former Falcons star Deion Sanders, who was present on the sideline as a television analyst. At halftime, the Falcons were comfortably ahead with a score of 35-0, limiting the Buccaneers to just 63 yards total and 2 first downs. Entering the 4th quarter, the Falcons extended their lead to an impressive 56-0. Although most of their starters were taken out of the game at this point, the Falcons still secured a dominant 56-14 victory over the Buccaneers. The Falcons ended the game with a total yardage advantage of 488-217. Matt Ryan finished with 21-of-24 for 286 yards and 3 touchdowns, achieving a 155.9 QBR. Julio Jones hauled in nine passes for 161 yards. The total score of 70 points remains the highest in a game for both teams in the rivalry. With a total of 56 points, this game became the second-highest scoring game in the history of the Falcons. It also tied for the second most points allowed by the Buccaneers in a single game. Following the game, Buccaneers HC Lovie Smith emphasized to his team that the outcome "left a scar" and that "Scars don't go away. The rest of our lives, we're going to remember this game."

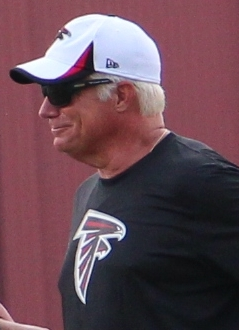
Mike Smith, the winningest and longest-tenured head coach for the Falcons, subsequently assumed the role of defensive coordinator for the Buccaneers

=== 2015–2019: Falcons dominate the rivalry ===
On January 8, 2015, Dirk Koetter, the Offensive Coordinator for the Falcons, accepted the position of Offensive Coordinator for the Buccaneers. Nearly a year later, he was elevated to the role of head coach for the team. On the same day, the Buccaneers also brought on Mike Smith, who had been the most successful and longest-tenured head coach for the Falcons, to serve as their Defensive Coordinator. When asked on how it felt to face his former team, Koetter replied "Obviously for me and Mike, we're both two years removed, so there's less and less guys that they've kept. There's some guys that are the same, but I think my emotional time with that is passed. We have to look at this as a football team. This is a divisional game on the road to open the season. ... I'm just worried about what our team does." Smith minimized the significance of returning to Atlanta, stating that his focus lies on his team's offense and strategizing to counter the Falcons' offensive tactics.

In their final matchup at the Georgia Dome in Atlanta, the Falcons took on their former coaches in the 2016 season opener on September 11.The Buccaneers won 31–24. Following the victory, Dirk Koetter was presented with the game ball, marking his first win as a head coach.

They met again on November 3 in Tampa for a Thursday Night Football matchup. The Falcons boasted the top offense in the league, led by Matt Ryan who topped the NFL in passing yardage with 2,980 yards. Facing their former head coaches, the Falcons amassed 461 total yards, with Ryan throwing for 344 yards and four touchdowns as the Falcons dominated the Buccaneers to a 43–28 victory. In his last four games against the Buccaneers, Ryan has thrown for 1,344 yards and nine touchdowns. After the game, Falcons fans stayed to chant "MVP!" for Ryan in the stands.

Ryan went on to win the MVP award as the Falcons made their second Super Bowl appearance. However, the Falcons faced a devastating loss to the New England Patriots in Super Bowl LI, as they choked a 28-3 lead. After suffering an embarrassing loss in the Super Bowl, the Falcons became the target of ridicule as they squandered a significant lead and missed out on their chance to secure their first Super Bowl Championship. Memes regarding the incident flooded the internet, with even the Buccaneers joining in on the fun. The Falcons took a jab at the Buccaneers on Twitter (now referred to as X) for promoting the sale of the team's fidget spinners online. In response, the Buccaneers posted a photo of CB Vernon Hargreaves (No. 28) and QB Jameis Winston (No. 3) fist-bumping in the locker room with the caption "We ain't worried 'bout nothing!", mocking the Falcons for blowing a 28-3 lead. However, the tweet was deleted by the team and Dirk Koetter issued an apology, expressing, "I want to make sure on behalf of the Bucs organization that I apologize to the Falcons for whatever that was supposed to be that went out on social media. That's not what our organization is about."

In the 2017 season, Julio Jones had one of his best performances against the Buccaneers at Atlanta's newly opened Mercedes-Benz Stadium on November 26. He caught 12 receptions for 253 yards and scored 2 touchdowns, as he contributed to the Falcons accumulation of 516 total yards, which set a new record for offensive yardage against the Buccaneers in a single game, as they won 34-20. At the end of the season, the Falcons, Saints, and Panthers all secured playoff spots, while the Buccaneers fell short, marking the first time three NFC South teams made it to the playoffs.

In the 2018 season, the teams clashed in Atlanta on October 14. The Falcons held a narrow lead in the final minutes, and the Buccaneers needed a touchdown to win. Jameis Winston, returning from a suspension, led the Buccaneers to Atlanta's 21-yard line with no timeouts left. In their final play, Winston took the snap and sprinted straight up the middle of the field instead of passing. As he approached the 10-yard line, he threw the ball away to avoid being tackled. WR Adam Humphries attempted to recover the ball but fumbled it, only for WR Mike Evans to pick it up and flick it to WR DeSean Jackson. Jackson had a clear path to the end zone but couldn't maintain control of the ball, causing it to roll out of bounds and sealing a 34-29 victory for the Falcons. Frustrated by the missed opportunity, Jackson expressed his anger by ripping off his helmet and kicking the pylon. He expressed his frustration in the postgame interview, firmly stating, "No way we should have lost to this team. We're a way better team than what we showed today." Despite having 510 total yards on offense, which set a new record for offensive yardage against the Falcons in a single game, they allowed 417 total yards from the Falcons. Following another disappointing defensive performance, the Buccaneers fired Mike Smith the following day.

In a meaningless season finale match held in Tampa, both teams aimed to end their disappointing seasons on a positive note. The Buccaneers held a 17–0 lead by halftime, but Matt Ryan led a comeback for his team, which included his first career reception. Despite the Buccaneers regaining the lead in the final minutes, Ryan orchestrated a game-winning drive that ended with a game-winning 37-yard field goal that sealed a Falcons' 34–32 victory and extended their winning streak against the Buccaneers to five games for the second time. Later that day, the Buccaneers fired Dirk Koetter. On January 8, 2019, Koetter was re-hired to be the offensive coordinator for the Falcons.

The Buccaneers ended their five-game losing streak against the Falcons in the 2019 season in Atlanta on November 24, in part of a great defensive performance DT Vita Vea made history by catching a one-yard touchdown pass from Jameis Winston, weighing in at 347 pounds, making him the heaviest player in NFL history to catch a touchdown pass.

In the first play of overtime in the season finale game on December 29 in Tampa, Jameis Winston threw a pick-six to OLB Deion Jones, leading to a 28–22 Falcons' victory and making Winston the first quarterback in NFL history to throw 30 touchdowns and 30 interceptions in a single season.

== 2020–2022: Tom Brady era ==
=== 2020–2021: Tom Brady's Buccaneers vs. Matt Ryan's Falcons ===
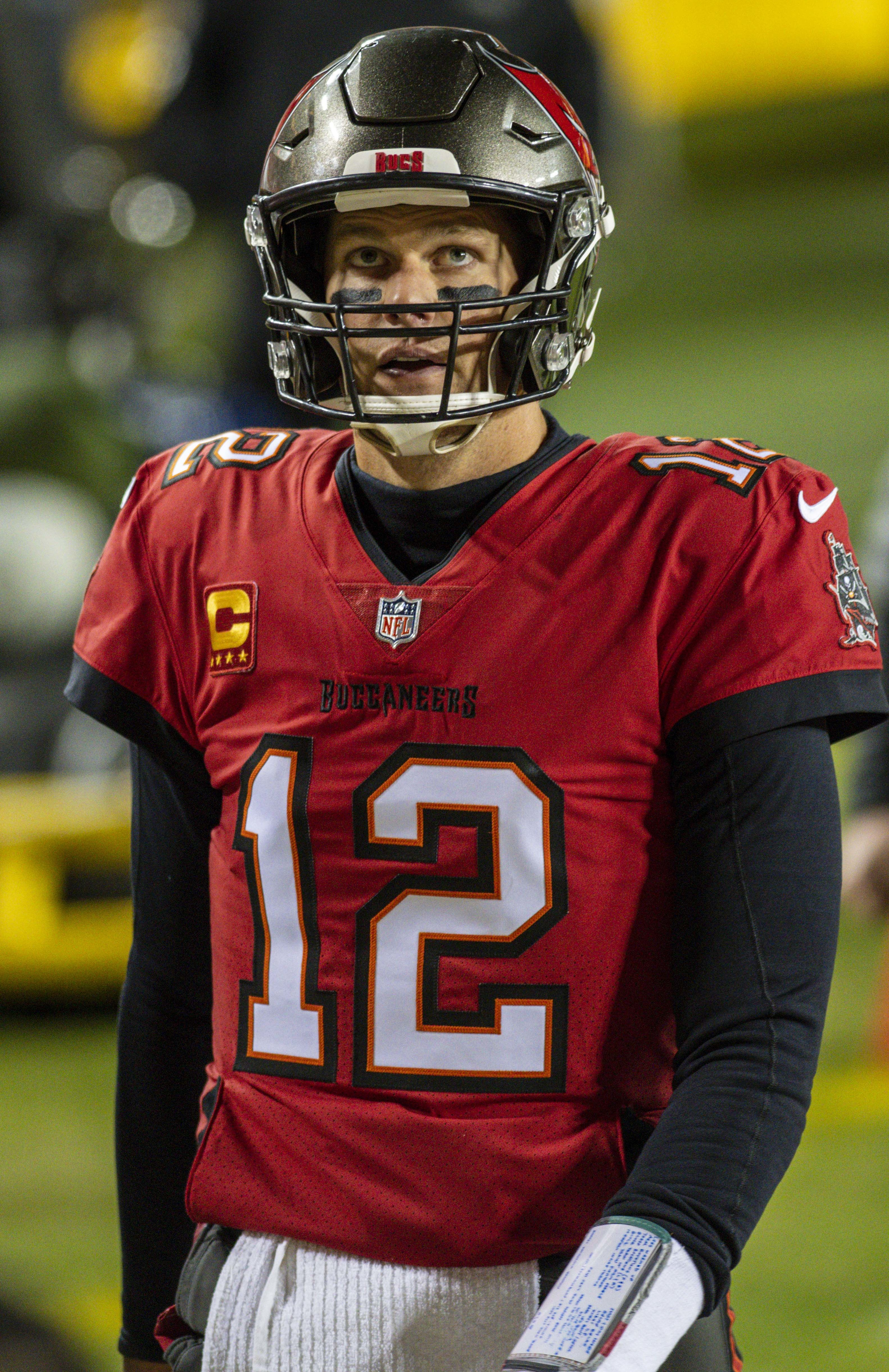
Brady joined the Buccaneers in the 2020 season, turning the tide of the rivalry in favor of the Buccaneers. The Falcons secured their first victory against him in twelve matchups during his final regular season game.

On March 20, 2020, former New England Patriots QB Tom Brady signed a two-year contract with the Buccaneers. To the Falcons, Brady is famously remembered as the quarterback who orchestrated the 25-point comeback in their Super Bowl LI defeat. On March 28 each year, Brady takes to social media to commemorate the occasion as the date is represented as "3/28". Additionally, Brady maintained a perfect record against the Falcons, boasting a 6-0 record.

Brady's Buccaneers and the Falcons officially met as divisional rivals on December 20 in Atlanta. The Falcons dominated the first half, taking a 17-0 lead. They finished with 261 total yards, led by Matt Ryan's 235 passing yards. On the defensive side, they stifled Tom Brady, limiting him to 70 passing yards and sacking him twice as the Buccaneers accumulated 60 total yards. However, the tides turned in the second half as Brady exploded. He threw for 320 yards and led the Buccaneers on four touchdown drives and a field goal in five consecutive possessions. Simultaneously, the Buccaneers defense applied pressure on Ryan, as the Falcons managed 33 total yards and a single field goal in the second half. Once the game ended, the Buccaneers won 31–27, completing their comeback. Brady overcame a sluggish start to complete 31-of-45 for 390 yards and threw two touchdowns. Brady once again showcased his ability to lead a remarkable comeback against the Falcons, prompting numerous comparisons to his Super Bowl comeback against the same team a couple of years ago.

This was also the last game Julio Jones played in the rivalry, as he sat out the remainder of the season from a hamstring injury. Subsequently, in the 2021 NFL offseason, he was traded to the Tennessee Titans. Jones was recognized for having some of his best performances against the Buccaneers during his time as a Falcons, accumulating 114 catches for 1,841 yards and 11 touchdowns in 16 games.

In the season finale on January 3 in Tampa, Brady threw for 399 yards and four touchdowns as he led the Buccaneers to a 44–27 victory. The Buccaneers secured the 5th seed and were heading back to the playoffs, whereas the Falcons ended up last in the NFC South, marking the first time since 2007 for both teams. In the playoffs, the Buccaneers defeated the Washington Football Team, Saints and Packers all on the road to reach their second Super Bowl appearance. In Super Bowl LV, the Buccaneers defeated the Kansas City Chiefs for their second Super Bowl Championship.

After defeating the Dallas Cowboys in the 2021 season opener, Brady posted a video on his social media celebrating the victory. However, keen observers pointed out that a clock positioned adjacent to Brady's left shoulder indicated the time as 3:28, likely a subtle reference to his remarkable comeback against the Falcons in the Super Bowl. This was also done just before their matchup, as Brady and the Buccaneers met the Falcons the following week on September 29 in Tampa. Despite the Falcons trailing by 3 by the start of the 4th quarter, the Buccaneers scored 20 unanswered points en route to a 48-25 victory. Brady threw for 276 yards and five touchdowns whereas Matt Ryan threw for 300 yards, two touchdowns, and three interceptions. Dating back to last season, the Buccaneers extended their win streak to 10 games while the Falcons extended their losing streak to 7 games. Additionally, the Buccaneers also matched their most points scored in a game against the Falcons.

They met again on December 5 in Atlanta. In the second half, the Buccaneers' defense recorded five sacks as they shut out the Falcons for the remainder of the game to a 30–17 win. Brady completed 38-of-51 and threw for 369 yards and four touchdowns, while also improving his career record against the Falcons to 10–0.

This would be the last start in the series for Matt Ryan, as he was traded to the Colts the following offseason. Ryan finished with a passer rating of 94.7, threw for 7,509 yards, 43 touchdowns and 19 interceptions in the 28 games he played against the Buccaneers. His statistics and game performances were crucial in tilting the balance of the rivalry in favor of the Falcons. Following a playoff loss to the eventual Super Bowl Champions Los Angeles Rams, Brady announced his retirement on February 1, 2022.

=== 2022: Final Tom Brady season ===
On March 13, 2022, Tom Brady, after declaring his retirement 40 days earlier, announced that he was reversing his decision and confirming that he would be playing for the Buccaneers again in the upcoming 2022 season.

After being released by the Titans, the Buccaneers signed longtime Falcons star player Julio Jones to a one-year contract. He did not get the chance to play against his former team due to missing significant time with a partially torn PCL. Ultimately, Jones was not retained and was let go after the season.

Still hoping to get their first win against him, the Falcons met the Buccaneers in Tampa on October 9. Entering the 4th quarter, the Buccaneers held on to a 21-0 lead when the Falcons scored 15 unanswered points to narrow the gap in the final minutes. In a crucial moment on a 3rd-and-5 play, Brady was sacked by DE Grady Jarrett. But instead of punting the ball back to the Falcons, which could have given them a chance for a potential game-winning drive, the officials made a controversial call, penalizing Jarrett for roughing the passer. This decision allowed Brady to run down the clock and secure a 21-15 victory for the Buccaneers while improving his undefeated record against the Falcons to 11-0. Following the game, fans, sports analysts, and Falcons players expressed dissatisfaction with the controversial call, suggesting that Brady's popularity may have influenced it. When questioned about the call, Brady simply stated, "I don't throw flags" while Jarrett chose not to speak to the media after the game.

The Buccaneers, despite entering the season as heavy favorites to win a weak NFC South, struggled throughout the season with injuries, sudden retirements, departures, and a weak offensive line. This allowed the Falcons, who were also struggling, to contend for the divisional title. Nevertheless, the Buccaneers secured the NFC South title for the second consecutive season after defeating the Panthers. The Buccaneers and Falcons clashed in the season finale in Atlanta, a game that held no significance for playoff berths or seeding. Brady began the game and guided the Buccaneers to 10 points. With 4 minutes remaining in the second quarter, Brady exited the game, and backup QB Blaine Gabbert took over. Brady finished with 13-of-17 for 84 yards and 1 touchdown. After Gabbert threw a touchdown pass, the Falcons shut down the Buccaneers offense for the remainder of the game, resulting in a 30-17 victory for the Falcons. Since Brady started the game, this win gave the Falcons their first win against Tom Brady, bringing the final record to 11–1. The loss also made the Buccaneers divisional champs with a losing record, becoming the 4th team in NFL history to do so, Additionally, it marked Brady's first and only losing season. This would turn out to be Tom Brady's last regular career game, as he announced his retirement for a second time on his social media on February 1, 2023. Throughout the six games played against the Falcons as a divisional rival, Brady proved to still be a nightmare for them, boasting impressive statistics including a passer rating of 111.7, throwing 1,868 yards, 17 touchdowns and only 2 interceptions.

== 2023–present: Post-Tom Brady and Matt Ryan ==
Replacing Tom Brady, the Buccaneers signed QB Baker Mayfield to a one-year contract on March 15, 2023. As the 2023 NFL season commenced, many anticipated that the Buccaneers would struggle and some even predicted that the Falcons would win the NFC South.

The first matchup between the two teams took place on October 22 in Tampa, which saw the Falcons win 16–13 following a game-winning 51–yard field goal by kicker Younghoe Koo. The second matchup occurred on December 10 in Atlanta, which saw Mayfield lead a game-winning 75-yard touchdown drive in the final minutes for a 29–25 Buccaneers victory.

Despite their mediocre performance, both teams were competing in a weak NFC South heading into the final week. Against expectations, the Buccaneers won the NFC South for a third consecutive year after defeating the Panthers in the season finale, which also eliminated the Falcons from playoff contention for the sixth consecutive season.

In the 2024 NFL offseason, the Buccaneers signed Mayfield to a three-year contract, while the Falcons signed QB Kirk Cousins to a four-year contract.

On October 3, Mayfield and Cousins competed in a Thursday Night Football matchup in Atlanta. In a high-scoring game, Younghoe Koo kicked a 52-yard field goal to send the game into overtime. In overtime, the Falcons received the ball, and Cousins connected with WR KhaDarel Hodge, who ran 45-yards for the game-winning touchdown, leading the Falcons to a 36–30 win. Cousins finished with 509 passing yards, setting a Falcons franchise record for most passing yards in a game.

== Season–by–season results ==
Tampa Bay Buccaneers vs. Atlanta Falcons Season-by-Season Results
1970s (Falcons, 2–1)

Season	Results	Location	Overall series	Notes
1977	Falcons; 17–0	Tampa Stadium	Falcons; 1–0	Buccaneers join the National Football League (NFL) last season as an expansion team but are placed in the American Football Conference (AFC). They moved to the National Football Conference (NFC) and the NFC Central this season. Buccaneers' losing streak extends to 25 games with their loss.
1978	Buccaneers; 14–9	Tampa Stadium	Tie; 1–1	
1979	Falcons; 17–14	Atlanta–Fulton County Stadium	Falcons; 2–1	

1980s (Buccaneers, 3–2)

Season	Results	Location	Overall series	Notes
1981	Buccaneers; 24–23	Tampa Stadium	Tie; 2–2	
1984	Buccaneers; 23–6	Tampa Stadium	Buccaneers; 3–2	
1986	Falcons; 23–20 (OT)	Tampa Stadium	Tie; 3–3	Falcons overcame a 20–7 halftime deficit.
1987	Buccaneers; 48–10	Tampa Stadium	Buccaneers; 4–3	Buccaneers record their largest victory over the Falcons with a 38–point differential and score their most points in a game against the Falcons. They also set franchise records for the largest victory and most points scored in a game at the time (broken in 2000, 2019 respectively). QB Steve DeBerg becomes the first Buccaneers QB to throw for five touchdown passes in a game.
1988	Falcons; 17–10	Atlanta–Fulton County Stadium	Tie; 4–4	

1990s (Tie, 4–4)

Season	Results	Location	Overall series	Notes
1990	Buccaneers; 23–17	Tampa Stadium	Buccaneers; 5–4	
1991	Falcons; 43–7	Atlanta–Fulton County Stadium	Tie; 5–5	Last matchup at the Atlanta-Fulton County Stadium, as the Falcons moved to the Georgia Dome the following season.
1992	Falcons; 35–7	Tampa Stadium	Falcons; 6–5	QB Wade Wilson becomes the first Falcons QB to throw for five touchdown passes in a game.
1993	Buccaneers; 31–24	Georgia Dome	Tie; 6–6	Buccaneers record their first win in Atlanta.
1994	Falcons; 34–13	Georgia Dome	Falcons; 7–6	
1995	Falcons; 24–21	Tampa Stadium	Falcons; 8–6	Last matchup played at Tampa Stadium as the Buccaneers moved to the Raymond James Stadium in the 1998 season.
1997	Buccaneers; 31–10	Georgia Dome	Falcons; 8–7	After their loss to the Buccaneers, the Falcons went on a 11-game home winning streak.
1999	Buccaneers; 19–10	Raymond James Stadium	Tie; 8–8	

2000s (Buccaneers, 10–7)

Season	Season series	at Tampa Bay Buccaneers	at Atlanta Falcons	Overall series	Notes
2000	Buccaneers 1–0	—N/a	Buccaneers; 27–14	Buccaneers; 9–8	
2002	Buccaneers 2–0	Buccaneers; 34–10	Buccaneers; 20–6	Buccaneers; 11–8	During the NFL realignment, both teams are moved to the newly created NFC South, resulting in two meetings annually. As of 4 November 2026, this remains the only time both teams made the playoffs in the same season. Buccaneers win Super Bowl XXXVII.
2003	Tie 1–1	Falcons; 30–28	Buccaneers; 31–10	Buccaneers; 12–9	Buccaneers win 6 straight meetings, currently the longest win streak in the series for either team. Falcons hire former Buccaneers general manager Rich McKay as their new general manager. Falcons' win eliminates the Buccaneers from playoff contention.
2004	Tie 1–1	Buccaneers; 27–0	Falcons; 24–14	Buccaneers; 13–10	Buccaneers record their first shut–out of the Falcons.
2005	Buccaneers 2–0	Buccaneers; 27–24 (OT)	Buccaneers; 30-27	Buccaneers; 15–10	In Tampa, both teams missed game-winning field goals in overtime, but the Buccaneers eventually kicked the game-winning field goal to eliminate the Falcons from playoff contention.
2006	Falcons 2–0	Falcons; 17–6	Falcons; 14–3	Buccaneers; 15–12	In Tampa, the Falcons accumulated 306 rushing yards, setting a franchise record for most rushing yards in a game (broken in 2008). Meanwhile, the Buccaneers set a franchise record for most rushing yards allowed in a game. Last start in the series for Michael Vick.
2007	Buccaneers 2–0	Buccaneers; 37–3	Buccaneers; 31–7	Buccaneers; 17–12	In Tampa, Buccaneers' Micheal Spurlock returned a 90-yard kickoff for a touchdown, becoming the first Buccaneers player to return a kickoff for a touchdown. Falcons QB Chris Redman finishes with a 0.0 passer rating.
2008	Tie 1–1	Buccaneers; 24–9	Falcons; 13–10 (OT)	Buccaneers; 18–13	Falcons draft QB Matt Ryan.
2009	Falcons 2–0	Falcons; 20–10	Falcons; 20–17	Buccaneers; 18–15	In Tampa, Falcons post consecutive winning seasons for the first time in franchise history with their win.

2010s (Falcons, 13–7)

Season	Season series	at Tampa Bay Buccaneers	at Atlanta Falcons	Overall series	Notes
2010	Falcons 2–0	Falcons; 28–24	Falcons; 27–21	Buccaneers; 18–17	
2011	Tie 1–1	Buccaneers; 16–13	Falcons; 45–24	Buccaneers; 19–18	Falcons draft WR Julio Jones.
2012	Tie 1–1	Falcons; 24–23	Buccaneers; 22–17	Buccaneers; 20–19	
2013	Tie 1–1	Buccaneers; 41–28	Falcons; 31–23	Buccaneers; 21–20	
2014	Falcons 2–0	Falcons; 27–17	Falcons; 56–14	Falcons; 22–21	In Atlanta, the Falcons record their largest victory over the Buccaneers with a 42–point differential and score their most points in a game against the Buccaneers. The game's final score is the highest-scoring game in the rivalry (70 points).
2015	Buccaneers 2–0	Buccaneers; 23–19	Buccaneers; 23–20 (OT)	Buccaneers; 23–22	
2016	Tie 1–1	Falcons; 43–28	Buccaneers; 31–24	Buccaneers; 24–23	Last matchup at Georgia Dome. Falcons lose Super Bowl LI.
2017	Falcons 2–0	Falcons; 24–21	Falcons; 34–20	Falcons; 25–24	Falcons open Mercedes-Benz Stadium.
2018	Falcons 2–0	Falcons; 34–32	Falcons; 34–29	Falcons; 27–24	In Tampa, the Falcons overcame a 17–0 halftime deficit.
2019	Tie 1–1	Falcons; 28–22 (OT)	Buccaneers; 35–22	Falcons; 28–25	Buccaneers quarterback Jameis Winston throws game-losing pick-six in overtime of game in Tampa, becoming the first player in NFL history to throw 30 touchdown passes and 30 interceptions in the same season.

2020s (Buccaneers, 8–5)

Season	Season series	at Tampa Bay Buccaneers	at Atlanta Falcons	Overall series	Notes
2020	Buccaneers 2–0	Buccaneers; 44–27	Buccaneers; 31–27	Falcons; 28–27	Buccaneers sign QB Tom Brady. In Atlanta, the Buccaneers overcome a 24–7 second-half deficit. Last start in the series for Falcons' WR Julio Jones. Buccaneers win Super Bowl LV.
2021	Buccaneers 2–0	Buccaneers; 48–25	Buccaneers; 30–17	Buccaneers; 29–28	In Tampa, the Buccaneers tied their most points scored in a game against the Falcons. Last start in the series for Falcons' QB Matt Ryan.
2022	Tie 1–1	Buccaneers; 21–15	Falcons; 30–17	Buccaneers; 30–29	Buccaneers sign Julio Jones, though he did not start against the Falcons. Falcons recorded their first win against Tom Brady, in what was also the final regular season game of his career. With the loss, the Buccaneers became the fourth team in NFL history to win their division with a losing record.
2023	Tie 1–1	Falcons; 16–13	Buccaneers; 29–25	Buccaneers; 31–30	Buccaneers win against the Panthers in their season finale game eliminated the Falcons from playoff contention.
2024	Falcons 2–0	Falcons; 31–26	Falcons; 36–30 (OT)	Falcons; 32–31	In Atlanta, Falcons' QB Kirk Cousins threw for 509 yards, setting a franchise record for their most passing yards in a game. Despite the Falcons sweeping the season series, the Buccaneers won the NFC South for the fourth straight season.
2025	Tie 1–1	Falcons; 29–28	Buccaneers; 23–20	Falcons; 33–32	In Tampa, Falcons overcame a 28–14 fourth-quarter deficit and won on a game-winning 43-yard field goal. Falcons committed 19 penalties, setting a franchise record for most penalties in a game. Falcons’ win over the Saints in the season finale eliminated the Buccaneers from playoff contention, as the Falcons, Buccaneers, and Panthers all finished with 8–9 records, but the Panthers won the NFC South title based on the three-way tiebreaker based on head-to-head record among the tied teams, eliminating both teams.
2026	Buccaneers 1–0	Buccaneers; 16–0	December 26/27	Tied; 33–33	In Tampa, the Buccaneers became the first NFL team since the 1974 Bills to win a game without completing a pass. The Buccaneers also finished with 324 rushing yards, setting a franchise record for most rushing yards in a game. Meanwhile, the Falcons set a franchise record for most rushing yards allowed in a game.

Summary of Results

Season	Season series	at Tampa Bay Buccaneers	at Atlanta Falcons	Notes
Regular season	Tied 33–33	Buccaneers 18–17	Falcons 16–15	

== See also ==
- National Football League rivalries
- NFC South

== Notes ==
=== Works cited ===
- BucPower.com
