= Andre Rison =

American football player (born 1967)

No. 85, 80, 81, 84, 89, 3, 87
- Position: Wide receiver

Personal information
- Born: March 18, 1967 (age 59); Flint, Michigan, U.S.
- Listed height: 6 ft 0 in (1.83 m)
- Listed weight: 188 lb (85 kg)

Career information
- High school: Flint Northwestern
- College: Michigan State (1985–1988)
- NFL draft: 1989: 1st round, 22nd overall pick

Career history
- Indianapolis Colts (1989); Atlanta Falcons (1990–1994); Cleveland Browns (1995); Jacksonville Jaguars (1996); Green Bay Packers (1996); Kansas City Chiefs (1997–1999); Oakland Raiders (2000); Toronto Argonauts (2004–2005)

Awards and highlights
- Super Bowl champion (XXXI); Grey Cup champion (2004); 2× First-team All-Pro (1990, 1991); 2× Second-team All-Pro (1992, 1993); 5× Pro Bowl (1990–1993, 1997); NFL receiving touchdowns co-leader (1993); PFWA All-Rookie Team (1989); 2× First-team All-Big Ten (1986, 1988); Second-team All-Big Ten (1987)

Career NFL statistics
- Receptions: 743
- Receiving yards: 10,205
- Receiving touchdowns: 84
- Stats at Pro Football Reference
- Stats at CFL.ca (archive)

Andre Previn Rison (born March 18, 1967) is an American former professional football player who was a wide receiver in the National Football League (NFL) for the Indianapolis Colts, Atlanta Falcons, Cleveland Browns, Jacksonville Jaguars, Green Bay Packers, Kansas City Chiefs, and Oakland Raiders. He also played in the Canadian Football League (CFL) for the Toronto Argonauts. Rison was selected to the Pro Bowl four consecutive times from 1990 to 1993 and once again in 1997.

Rison won a Super Bowl championship with the Packers in 1997 over the New England Patriots, scoring the first points of the game on a 54-yard touchdown catch from quarterback Brett Favre. He also won a Grey Cup championship with the Toronto Argonauts in 2004. He is one of the few players to win professional football championships in both the United States and Canada. He was released by the Argonauts during the 2005 CFL season. He holds an NFL record for scoring a touchdown with 7 teams.

He was a star player at Flint Northwestern High School and in college at Michigan State University. As a senior at Michigan State, Rison had 30 receptions for 709 yards and 5 touchdowns; he was a prominent contributor to the 1987 Michigan State squad that won the Rose Bowl on January 1, 1988.

During the early portion of his career, he received the nickname "Bad Moon" Rison, a reference to the Creedence Clearwater Revival song "Bad Moon Rising". Michael Adler is credited with giving the nickname to Chris Berman. When he played for the Chiefs, he had the nickname "Spiderman".

== Professional career ==
Pre-draft measurables
Height	Weight	40-yard dash	10-yard split	20-yard split	20-yard shuttle	Vertical jump	Broad jump
5 ft 10 in (1.78 m)	187 lb (85 kg)	4.47 s	1.56 s	2.68 s	3.96 s	35.0 in (0.89 m)	9 ft 6 in (2.90 m)

=== Indianapolis Colts ===
The Indianapolis Colts selected Rison in the first round (22nd overall) of the 1989 NFL draft. In his rookie season, he caught 52 passes for 820 yards with four touchdown receptions.

=== Atlanta Falcons ===
On April 20, 1990, the Indianapolis Colts traded Rison, Chris Hinton, a fifth-round pick in the 1990 NFL Draft, and their first-round pick on the 1991 NFL draft to the Atlanta Falcons for their first overall pick and their fourth-round pick in the 1990 NFL Draft. The Indianapolis Colts used the trade to move up to select Jeff George first overall in the 1990 NFL draft. His next season marked the first of five very productive campaigns with the Falcons. During these years, Rison finished near the top of most receiving categories, and led all NFL players with 15 receiving touchdowns in 1993. Andre Rison was only the fifth receiver in NFL history to score 60 touchdowns in his first six seasons. Rison led the NFL in most receptions in his first five seasons. Rison was second in the NFL for most receptions in six seasons.

=== Cleveland Browns ===
After the 1994 season, Rison signed a lucrative free agent contract with the Cleveland Browns, as operated by Art Modell, who had to take a loan for the signing bonus for a deal was totalled five years for $17 million, which was at the time the most lucrative wide receiver deal ever signed. Rison was expected to become the featured receiving threat for the Browns, who had made the playoffs the year before. Rison, who had been named to the Pro Bowl in four of his previous six seasons, had career lows in receptions (47), yards (701), touchdowns (3), receptions per game (2.9), and yards per game (43.8). Rison also developed a feud with the Cleveland fans, who were angered over the announcement that the team would be relocating to Baltimore to go with his performance, with Rison later stating he had received death threats mailed to him. After a home loss to the Packers, Rison, who had been booed by the fans throughout the game, lashed out, stating, "We didn't make the fucking move. So, for all the booers, fuck you too. I'll be glad when we get to Baltimore, if that's the case. We don't have any home-field advantage. I've never been booed at home. Baltimore's our home. Baltimore, here we come." Rison, however, did not make the move with the team to Baltimore as he was released to make room for the new first-round picks drafted by the Ravens (Ray Lewis and Jonathan Ogden). He joined the Jacksonville Jaguars in the offseason.

=== Jacksonville Jaguars ===
In 1996, Rison spent the first ten games with the Jacksonville Jaguars, catching 34 passes for 458 yards and two touchdowns. Rison had a miscommunication with quarterback Mark Brunell in week 12 that resulted in an interception in a 28–3 loss to the Pittsburgh Steelers. This mistake caused tempers to flare between the two, and Rison was subsequently released.

=== Green Bay Packers ===
The Green Bay Packers claimed Rison off of waivers on November 20, 1996. He played in five of the remaining games, catching 13 passes for 135 yards and one touchdown. In three playoff games, culminating in a Super Bowl appearance, he caught seven passes for 143 yards and two touchdowns, with Rison catching the opening touchdown in Super Bowl XXXI, a 35–21 victory.

=== Kansas City Chiefs ===
He signed with the Kansas City Chiefs prior to the 1997 season. For the second time in his career (1993 being the only other time), Rison started in all 16 games of the season. He caught 72 passes for 1,092 yards and seven touchdowns as the Chiefs went on to become the #1 seed that year. In the Divisional round playoff game, Rison caught eight passes for 110 yards, but the Chiefs lost 14–10 to division rival and eventual Super Bowl champion Denver Broncos. The following year, he caught 40 passes in 14 total games for 542 yards and five touchdowns. For 1999, he played 15 games and regressed further, catching 21 passes for 218 yards with no touchdowns.

=== Oakland Raiders ===
With the Oakland Raiders in 2000, he played in all 16 games without starting, catching 41 passes for 606 yards and six touchdowns. The Raiders made a run in the playoffs, and Rison made small contribution, catching three combined passes for 44 yards.

Rison finished his NFL career with 743 receptions for 10,205 yards and 84 touchdowns, along with eight kickoff returns for 150 yards and nine carries for 23 yards.

=== Toronto Argonauts ===
He signed with the Toronto Argonauts of the Canadian Football League in August 2004, who went on to win the 92nd Grey Cup championship that year. He was released by the team in August 2005.

== Nicknames ==
Rison is also remembered for his life off the football field, which garnered him the nickname "Bad Moon" Rison from ESPN sportscaster Chris Berman, alluding to the song "Bad Moon Rising" by Creedence Clearwater Revival.

During his three-season stint with Kansas City, Rison was nicknamed Spider-Man and would often fake shooting a web, like Spider-Man after scoring a touchdown. Rison gave himself the nickname in part because he viewed Spider-Man as a positive character and wanted to be thought of as less of a headache and problem. His "Spider-Man" nickname has been named one of the best nicknames in sports history by Bleacher Report.

== Life after football ==
=== Coaching ===
In the 2006–2008 high school football seasons, Rison was assistant coach at Beecher High School in Flint, Michigan. The head coach was Courtney Hawkins, Rison's former teammate at Michigan State.

In March 2010, Rison was named the new head coach for Flint Northwestern High School's football team.

For the opening week of the 2010 and 2011 high school football seasons, Rison and Flint Northwestern faced off against Courtney Hawkins and Flint Beecher. Not only did these games showcase two former NFL players coaching at their alma maters, but the schools are so close geographically that it made for an intriguing and intense rivalry. The crowds came in large numbers for both games, which forced each game to Flint's 11,000 seat Atwood Stadium, instead of Flint Beecher's Russ Reynolds Field or Flint Northwestern's Guy V. Houston Stadium. Beecher won the 2010 opener, 28–18, spoiling Rison's head coaching debut. The 2011 opener was a thriller, with Northwestern holding on for a 46-44 double overtime victory. In two years at Flint Northwestern, Rison's coaching the team showed noticeable improvement in his second season, nearly doubling their offensive output, and losing four of their games by a combined total of only nine points. In May 2012, Rison announced that he was leaving Flint Northwestern in order to complete his degree at Michigan State and join the football team as an assistant coach.

Andre Rison coached in 2014 for Skyline High School in Ann Arbor, Michigan, as the offensive coordinator, where he recorded an 0–9 record. He also coached his son Hunter Rison, who committed to Michigan State on April 1, 2016. During the 2023–2024 school year, Rison served as the offensive coordinator for University Liggett School in Grosse Pointe Woods, Michigan. On June 4, 2024, he was announced as the new interim head coach of the University Liggett team.

On November 6, 2026, Rison was named as the offensive coordinator for the Milwaukee Silverbacks of the Continental Football League.

=== Other interests ===
Rison also trains wide receivers at the Andre Rison Football Academy, and he coached in the 2008 Hawaii All-Star Classic. Rison appeared on an episode of the MTV reality show Made. He worked to help a student become a high school varsity quarterback. Rison was a featured Pro on the second season of the reality show Pros vs. Joes on Spike TV, and also appeared in an episode of TNA Impact (now called Impact Wrestling). He was at the center of the hexagonal ring, and then Abyss came out and Black Hole slammed Rison.

Rison appears prominently in the 2012 ESPN 30 for 30 documentary Broke about former professional athletes who squander their wealth. The film, directed and written by Billy Corben of Rakontur, was featured at the 2012 Tribeca Film Festival as part of its TFF/ESPN Sports Festival, and is included in the second season (styled as "Volume II") of ESPN's 30 for 30 documentary series.

Rison was inducted into the Michigan Sports Hall of Fame in Detroit on September 15, 2017.

== Personal life ==
Rison dated Lisa Lopes of TLC on and off from 1993 to 2001. Their relationship was rocky, marked with domestic violence allegations. During one altercation in 1994, Lopes lit his shoes on fire in the bathtub, burning their house down; she was charged with first-degree arson.

Andre's son, Hunter Rison, played as a true freshman wide receiver for Michigan State University in 2017, before transferring to Kansas State University in 2018. While at Kansas State, he was charged with battery of a young woman in June 2019. Shortly thereafter, he pledged to attend Fullerton College in 2020. After waiting out part of the COVID-19 pandemic in Arizona with his mother Racquel Banks, Hunter enrolled and played at Grand Valley State University in 2021.

== NFL career statistics ==
Legend
	Super Bowl champion
	Led the league
**Bold**	Career high

=== Regular season ===
Year	Team	Games		Receiving				
Year	Team	GP	GS	Rec	Yds	Avg	Lng	TD
1989	IND	**16**	13	52	820	**15.8**	61	4
1990	ATL	**16**	15	82	1,208	14.7	75	10
1991	ATL	**16**	15	81	976	12.0	39	12
1992	ATL	15	13	**93**	1,119	12.0	71	11
1993	ATL	**16**	**16**	86	**1,242**	14.4	53	**15**
1994	ATL	15	14	81	1,088	13.4	69	8
1995	CLE	**16**	14	47	701	14.9	59	3
1996	JAX	10	9	34	458	13.5	61	2
1996	GB	5	4	13	135	10.4	22	1
1997	KC	**16**	**16**	72	1,092	15.2	45	7
1998	KC	14	13	40	542	13.6	**80**	5
1999	KC	15	14	21	218	10.4	20	0
2000	OAK	**16**	0	41	606	14.8	49	6
Career		186	156	743	10,205	13.7	80	84
