= Mike Pritchard =

American football player (born 1969)

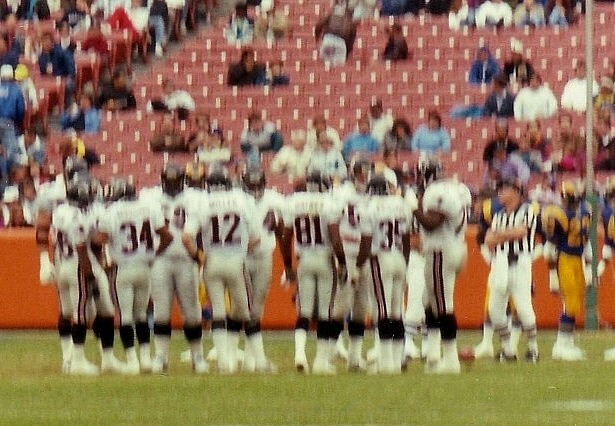

No. 35, 81, 85
- Position: Wide receiver

Personal information
- Born: October 26, 1969 (age 57); Shaw Air Force Base, South Carolina, U.S.
- Listed height: 5 ft 10 in (1.78 m)
- Listed weight: 188 lb (85 kg)

Career information
- High school: Rancho (North Las Vegas, Nevada)
- College: Colorado
- NFL draft: 1991: 1st round, 13th overall pick

Career history
- Atlanta Falcons (1991–1993); Denver Broncos (1994–1995); Seattle Seahawks (1996–1999)

Awards and highlights
- PFWA All-Rookie Team (1991); National champion (1990); First-team All-Big Eight (1990)

Career NFL statistics
- Receptions: 422
- Receiving yards: 5,187
- Touchdowns: 26
- Stats at Pro Football Reference

Michael Robert Pritchard (born October 26, 1969) is an American former professional football player who was a wide receiver in the National Football League (NFL). He played college football at the University of Colorado. He played in the NFL for the Atlanta Falcons, Denver Broncos, Seattle Seahawks over a nine-year career.

Pritchard grew up in Las Vegas and starred as an all-purpose back. His athletic talent attracted attention from collegiate football programs from across the nation. Pritchard eventually accepted an athletic scholarship offer from head coach Bill McCartney of the University of Colorado. There, Pritchard was a versatile player who excelled at a variety of positions, including wide receiver, kick returner, and running back.

As a senior in 1990, he was named first-team All-Big Eight at wide receiver, also garnering honorable mention All-American honors from the UPI. That same year he was named the most valuable player on CU's national championship team, the only one in school history. Pritchard was later inducted into the University of Colorado sports Hall of Fame in 2015.

Pritchard was the first of nine Colorado players selected in the 1991 NFL draft. He was selected 13th overall by the Atlanta Falcons. He played nine seasons in the NFL, spending time with Atlanta (1991–93), Denver (1994–95) and Seattle (1996–99). Pritchard had his best professional season in 1992 while he was with the Falcons. That year he caught 77 receptions for 827 yards and scored 5 touchdowns. In 127 career NFL games, he caught 422 passes for 5,178 yards (12.3 yard average) and scored 26 touchdowns.

After his playing career, he moved back to his hometown of Las Vegas where he embarked on a broadcasting career doing color commentary on the UNLV radio network. He has also appeared on TV and radio as a commentator and in both the Las Vegas and Denver areas. Pritchard currently co-hosts a radio morning show on KRLV in Las Vegas.

== NFL career statistics ==
Legend
**Bold**	Career high

=== Regular season ===
Year	Team	Games		Receiving				
Year	Team	GP	GS	Rec	Yds	Avg	Lng	TD
1991	ATL	**16**	11	50	624	12.5	29	2
1992	ATL	**16**	15	**77**	827	10.7	38	5
1993	ATL	15	14	74	736	9.9	34	**7**
1994	DEN	3	0	19	271	14.3	50	1
1995	DEN	15	13	33	441	13.4	45	3
1996	SEA	**16**	5	21	328	**15.6**	44	1
1997	SEA	**16**	15	64	**843**	13.2	**61**	2
1998	SEA	**16**	**16**	58	742	12.8	50	3
1999	SEA	14	5	26	375	14.4	51	2
Career		127	94	422	5,187	12.3	61	26

=== Playoffs ===
Year	Team	Games		Receiving				
Year	Team	GP	GS	Rec	Yds	Avg	Lng	TD
1991	ATL	**2**	**2**	**10**	**119**	**11.9**	**17**	0
1999	SEA	1	0	3	34	11.3	**17**	0
Career		3	2	13	153	11.8	17	0
