= Darion Conner =

American football player (born 1967)

No. 56, 58, 93, 43, 27
- Position: Linebacker

Personal information
- Born: September 28, 1967 (age 59); Macon, Mississippi, U.S.
- Listed height: 6 ft 3 in (1.91 m)
- Listed weight: 250 lb (113 kg)

Career information
- High school: Noxubee County (Macon, Mississippi)
- College: Jackson State
- NFL draft: 1990: 2nd round, 27th overall pick

Career history
- Atlanta Falcons (1990–1993); New Orleans Saints (1994); Carolina Panthers (1995); Philadelphia Eagles (1996–1997); Cleveland Browns (1999)*; Tampa Bay Storm (1999–2005)
- * Offseason or practice squad member only

Awards and highlights
- ArenaBowl champion (2003)

Career NFL statistics
- Tackles: 519
- Sacks: 33
- Interceptions: 1
- Stats at Pro Football Reference

Darion Conner (born September 28, 1967) is an American former professional football player who was a linebacker in the National Football League (NFL) and the Arena Football League (AFL). He played for eight seasons in the NFL, from 1990 to 1997 and seven seasons (1999–2005) in the AFL. He was selected in the second round (27th overall) of the 1990 NFL draft by the Atlanta Falcons. He played college football for the Jackson State Tigers. He served a 15-year prison sentence for DUI-manslaughter and vehicular homicide. However, in July 2008, an appeals court ruled that he would be given a retrial.

In his career, Conner has played for the New Orleans Saints, Carolina Panthers, Philadelphia Eagles, Cleveland Browns, and Tampa Bay Storm. He is the highest NFL draft pick to ever play for the Tampa Bay Storm.

== Early life and college ==
In high school, Conner was a three-year All-State selection as a fullback and linebacker for Noxubee County High School. He also lettered in track and was second in the state in the 100 meters. He later attended Jackson State, where he was a First-team All-SWAC in his four seasons there. He was named the 1989 SWAC Defensive Player of the Year and attended the Senior Bowl, the East-West Shrine Game, and the Blue-Gray Classic, of which he was named the defensive MVP. He was a three-year NCAA All-America selection and was named to the Kodak and Sheraton All-American teams.

== Professional career ==
Pre-draft measurables
Height	Weight	Arm length	Hand span	40-yard dash	10-yard split	20-yard split	20-yard shuttle	Vertical jump	Broad jump	Bench press
6 ft 2 5/8 in (1.90 m)	256 lb (116 kg)	32 in (0.81 m)	8 7/8 in (0.23 m)	4.81 s	1.66 s	2.73 s	4.43 s	35.5 in (0.90 m)	9 ft 2 in (2.79 m)	19 reps

=== National Football League (1990–1999) ===
Conner was selected in the second round (27th overall) of the 1990 NFL draft by the Atlanta Falcons. He played for the Falcons for four seasons before joining the New Orleans Saints where he played for one season, which happened to be the best season of his career, he recorded 10.5 sacks and his only career interception (which he returned 56 yards in a Week 16 Monday Night Football match against the Dallas Cowboys before rookie offensive lineman Larry Allen memorably chased him down). He then went and played for the expansion Carolina Panthers. He was then signed on September 18, 1996, by the Philadelphia Eagles. He played two seasons there before being signed on December 22, 1998, along with defensive back Corey Dowden, as one of the original members of the "new" Cleveland Browns. But was released on June 3, 1999. He never played in the NFL again after being released by the Browns.

==== NFL statistics ====
Year	Team	Games	Combined tackles	Tackles	Assisted tackles	Sacks	Forced fumbles	Fumble recoveries	Fumble return yards	Interceptions	Interception return yards	Yards per interception return	Longest interception return	Interceptions returned for touchdown	Passes defended
1990	ATL	16	0	0	0	2.0	0	0	0	0	0	0	0	0	0
1991	ATL	15	0	0	0	3.5	0	1	0	0	0	0	0	0	0
1992	ATL	16	0	0	0	7.0	0	0	0	0	0	0	0	0	0
1993	ATL	14	34	24	10	1.5	1	0	0	0	0	0	0	0	1
1994	NO	16	54	40	14	10.5	3	1	0	1	56	56	56	0	3
1995	CAR	16	51	40	11	7.0	1	0	0	0	0	0	0	0	2
1996	PHI	7	2	1	1	0.0	0	0	0	0	0	0	0	0	0
1997	PHI	14	8	4	4	1.5	1	0	0	0	0	0	0	0	0
Career		114	149	109	40	33.0	6	2	0	1	56	56	56	0	6

=== Arena Football League (1999–2005) ===
After being released by the Cleveland Browns, Conner signed with the Tampa Bay Storm of the Arena Football League on July 20. As a rookie in 1999, he played in the final two games of the season. He recorded a sack and two tackles, in his first game, on the road against the San Jose SaberCats on July 24. He was named Ironman of the Game in his second game, against the New England Sea Wolves. In that game he recorded his first touchdown in the AFL, a 23-yard screen pass.

In 2000, his first full season in the AFL, Conner opened the season by sacking New England quarterback Chad Salisbury. On the play Conner also forced a fumble that led to a Storm touchdown. He missed five games during the season, but had a strong performance on July 1 against the Orlando Predators, recording a career-high six tackles and recording 2.5 sacks in a win. He led the Storm in sacks on the season, he also recorded 15 total tackles.

In 2001, Conner made his largest impact on defense for the Storm. He played in 12 games and recorded 20 tackles, including three for loss and 2.5 sacks. He also broke up two passes and forced two fumbles. He tied for second on the team in sacks. As he did in the previous season, he recorded the first team sack of the season in the season opener against the Florida Bobcats. On June 25 at Florida he returned Willie Wyatt's blocked field goal three yards for a touchdown. He forced fumbles in back-to-back games, on the road against the Grand Rapids Rampage at home against the Carolina Cobras.

In 2002, Conner led the team with 3.5 tackles for loss, finishing the regular season with 10.5 total tackles and one sack. In at least two games on the season he played OL / DL.

In 2003, Conner missed the first two games with an ankle injury. He was placed on injured reserve May 17, 2003. For the season, he recorded seven tackles (two solo), one carry for six yards.

In 2004, Conner played in ten games and finished tied for second on the team with two sacks. He moved into ninth place on the Storm's career sacks list. He finished the season with 12 total tackles (ten solo), one pass break up, and one forced fumble.

In 2005, Conner recorded one pass break up, before being arrested and charged with DUI-manslaughter and vehicular homicide.

== Arrest and vehicular homicide conviction ==
In 2005, Conner was arrested and convicted of DUI-manslaughter and vehicular homicide, after a September 4, 2004 car accident while he had a BAC of .27 left a bicyclist, Jonathan Michael Conklin, 32 of Carrollwood, Florida, dead. A witness testified at Conner's July 2005 trial, that just before 2 a.m. on September 4, 2004, Conner was driving a Toyota Land Cruiser on Linebaugh Avenue. They also said that Conner's headlights were off when he first turned onto Linebaugh. He then turned them on but swerved across the road lines. The prosecution argued that Conner veered into the bike lane and struck Conklin.

Conner was convicted of DUI-manslaughter and vehicular homicide and served a 15-year prison sentence, the maximum allowed punishment. In July 2008, an appeals court ruled that he would be given a retrial. Regardless of the retrial however, Conner was still sentenced to 15 years in prison (with four years of time served at that point). He was released in 2018.
