= Tory Epps =

American football player (1967–2005)

No. 74, 65, 79, 52
- Position: Defensive tackle

Personal information
- Born: May 28, 1967; Uniontown, Pennsylvania, U.S.
- Died: June 1, 2005 (aged 38); Uniontown, Pennsylvania, U.S.
- Listed height: 6 ft 1 in (1.85 m)
- Listed weight: 280 lb (127 kg)

Career information
- High school: Uniontown (Uniontown, Pennsylvania)
- College: Memphis
- NFL draft: 1990: 8th round, 195th overall pick

Career history
- Atlanta Falcons (1990–1993); San Diego Chargers (1993); Chicago Bears (1993–1994); New Orleans Saints (1995); Tampa Bay Storm (2000–2002)

Career NFL statistics
- Tackles: 209
- Sacks: 5.5
- Forced fumbles: 1
- Stats at Pro Football Reference

Torrean "Tory" Douglas Epps (May 28, 1967 – June 1, 2005) was an American professional football defensive tackle in the National Football League (NFL) for the Atlanta Falcons, the Chicago Bears, and the New Orleans Saints. He was drafted by the Falcons in the eighth round of the 1990 NFL Draft. He also played in the Arena Football League for the Tampa Bay Storm. He played college football at Memphis State University. 1988 Second Team All South-Independent. Epps died of a blood clot in 2005.
