= Howard Dinkins =

American football player (born 1969)

No. 51
- Position: Linebacker

Personal information
- Born: April 26, 1969 (age 57); Jacksonville, Florida, U.S.
- Listed height: 6 ft 1 in (1.85 m)
- Listed weight: 223 lb (101 kg)

Career information
- High school: Jacksonville (FL) Ribault
- College: Florida State
- NFL draft: 1992: 3rd round, 73rd overall pick

Career history
- Atlanta Falcons (1992–1993)
- Stats at Pro Football Reference

Howard James Dinkins Jr. (born April 26, 1969) is an American former professional football player who was a linebacker in the National Football League (NFL). He played college football for the Florida State Seminoles. He was selected by the Atlanta Falcons in the third round of the 1992 NFL draft. he was a 1991 All-South Independent football team selection.
