= Tony Smith (American football) =

American gridiron football player (born 1970)

No. 28, 32
- Position: Running back

Personal information
- Born: June 29, 1970 (age 56); Chicago, Illinois, U.S.
- Listed height: 6 ft 1 in (1.85 m)
- Listed weight: 215 lb (98 kg)

Career information
- High school: Warren Central (Vicksburg, Mississippi)
- College: Southern Miss
- NFL draft: 1992: 1st round, 19th overall pick

Career history
- Atlanta Falcons (1992–1994); Carolina Panthers (1995–1996); Toronto Argonauts (1998); Philadelphia Eagles (1999)*
- * Offseason or practice squad member only

Career NFL statistics
- Rushing yards: 329
- Rushing average: 3.8
- Rushing touchdowns: 2
- Stats at Pro Football Reference

Tony Derrell Smith (born June 29, 1970) is an American former professional football player who was a running back for three seasons with the Atlanta Falcons of the National Football League (NFL). He played college football for the Southern Miss Golden Eagles and was selected by the Falcons in the first round of the 1992 NFL draft with the 19th overall pick. He also played for the Toronto Argonauts of the Canadian Football League (CFL).

== Southern Mississippi ==
A receiver turned running back, Smith rushed for 1,703 yards at Southern Mississippi and scored 12 touchdowns over three seasons. Brett Favre was Smith's quarterback during the first two seasons of his college career.

== NFL career ==
Smith was chosen in the first round (19th overall) in the 1992 NFL draft by the Atlanta Falcons. Legend has it that Atlanta acquired this pick from Green Bay in exchange for Brett Favre, but Favre was actually traded for the 17th pick in the 1992 draft. Atlanta later traded this pick to the Dallas Cowboys. Atlanta received the 19th pick in the draft, which they used to draft Smith. Falcons Head Coach Jerry Glanville wanted the team to draft a defensive back and was unhappy with the choice of a running back.

Smith got to his first training camp late, after a five-day holdout. He signed a $2.5 million contract, which was the richest in team history at the time. During his rookie season, he led the team with 87 carries and began returning kicks and punts.

By his second year, still not in the favor of Glanville, Smith never played an offensive snap. The same thing happened the following season and Smith found himself a free agent after the 1994 season.

Smith signed with the expansion Carolina Panthers, but broke his tibia and fibula in a preseason game against the Chicago Bears. He was placed on injured reserve and released the following offseason when his leg hadn't fully healed.

Smith spent a season in the Canadian Football League with the Toronto Argonauts as an attempt to revive his NFL career. He was signed the following offseason with the Philadelphia Eagles in 1999, but Smith's career was officially over after he "popped" his hamstring and the Eagles released him on May 4, 1999,

In a 2016 interview, Smith claimed to be at peace with his NFL career being labeled a "bust." "I didn't go into the game to be a bust on purpose," Smith said. "Sometimes, things just work out that way, you know. That's just what it was. Now, it's no big deal to me at this point. I've outgrown it."
