= Harper LeBel =

American football player (born 1963)

No. 85, 87, 88, 82
- Positions: Long snapper, tight end

Personal information
- Born: July 14, 1963 (age 63); Granada Hills, California, U.S.
- Listed height: 6 ft 4 in (1.93 m)
- Listed weight: 250 lb (113 kg)

Career information
- High school: Notre Dame (Sherman Oaks, California)
- College: Colorado State
- NFL draft: 1985: 12th round, 321st overall pick

Career history
- Kansas City Chiefs (1985)*; San Francisco 49er (1986)*; San Diego Chargers (1987); Dallas Cowboys (1988)*; Tampa Bay Buccaneers (1988)*; Seattle Seahawks (1989); Philadelphia Eagles (1990); Atlanta Falcons (1991–1996); Green Bay Packers (1997)*; Chicago Bears (1997); Baltimore Ravens (1998)
- * Offseason or practice squad member only

Career NFL statistics
- Games played: 136
- Games started: 2
- Fumble recoveries: 2
- Stats at Pro Football Reference

Brian Harper LeBel (born July 14, 1963) is an American former professional football player who was a long snapper in the National Football League (NFL) for the San Diego Chargers, Seattle Seahawks, Philadelphia Eagles, Atlanta Falcons, Chicago Bears and Baltimore Ravens. He played college football for the Colorado State Rams.

== Early life ==
LeBel attended Notre Dame High School in Sherman Oaks, California. He practiced track, football, baseball and basketball.

He accepted a football scholarship from Colorado State University. He had 99 receptions for 1,057 yards to finish fourth on the school's All-time receiving list.

== Professional career ==
LeBel was selected by the Kansas City Chiefs in the 12th round (321st overall) of the 1985 NFL draft. He was released on August 12.

After the NFLPA strike was declared on the third week of the 1987 season, those contests were canceled (reducing the 16-game season to 15) and the NFL decided that the games would be played with replacement players. He was signed to be a part of the San Diego Chargers replacement team. He was released after one game.

In 1988, he was signed as a free agent by the Dallas Cowboys. He was released on August 1. On August 16, he was signed by the Tampa Bay Buccaneers. He was released on August 22.

== Personal life ==
LeBel is currently a weekend sports talk show host on Sportsradio 92.9 The Game in Atlanta.
