= Tracey Eaton =

American football player (born 1965)

No. 21, 32
- Position: Defensive back

Personal information
- Born: July 19, 1965 (age 61); Medford, Oregon, U.S.
- Listed height: 6 ft 1 in (1.85 m)
- Listed weight: 195 lb (88 kg)

Career information
- High school: Medford
- College: Portland State
- NFL draft: 1988: 7th round, 187th overall pick

Career history
- Houston Oilers (1988–1989); Phoenix Cardinals (1990); Atlanta Falcons (1991–1993)

Career NFL statistics
- Interceptions: 4
- Stats at Pro Football Reference

Tracey Bruce Eaton (born July 19, 1965) is an American former professional football player who was a defensive back in the National Football League (NFL) for the Houston Oilers, Phoenix Cardinals and Atlanta Falcons. He played college football for the Portland State Vikings. He was selected in the seventh round by the Oilers in the 1988 NFL draft.

He is also an entrepreneur. Eaton and his wife, Kimberly, speak on stage across the world to millions of people each year. They have coached and mentored thousands.
