= Brian Mitchell (American football coach) =

American football player and coach (born 1968)

NC State Wolfpack
- Title: Cornerbacks coach

Personal information
- Born: December 13, 1968 (age 57); Indianapolis, Indiana, U.S.
- Listed height: 5 ft 9 in (1.75 m)
- Listed weight: 164 lb (74 kg)

Career information
- High school: Waco (Waco, Texas)
- College: BYU
- NFL draft: 1991: 7th round, 172nd overall pick

Career history

Playing
- Atlanta Falcons (1991); Dallas Cowboys (1992)*; Atlanta Falcons (1992–1993)
- * Offseason or practice squad member only

Coaching
- BYU (1994–2005) Defensive backs coach; Texas Tech (2006–2009) Cornerbacks coach; East Carolina (2010–2012) Defensive coordinator & defensive backs coach; West Virginia (2013–2015) Cornerbacks coach; Virginia Tech (2016–2019) Defensive backs coach; NC State (2020–present) Cornerbacks coach

Awards and highlights
- First-team All-WAC (1990); Second-team All-WAC (1989)

Career NFL statistics
- Interceptions: 1
- Fumble recoveries: 1
- Sacks: 2
- Stats at Pro Football Reference

Brian Keith Mitchell (born December 13, 1968) is an American football coach and former professional cornerback who played three seasons for the Atlanta Falcons in the National Football League (NFL). Mitchell is the coach cornerbacks coach at North Carolina State University.

== Professional career ==
Mitchell competed in football and track and field at Waco High School in Waco, Texas. In college, he played for the BYU Cougars for both football and track. He was an All-American sprinter for the BYU Cougars track and field team, leading off their 4 × 100 meters relay team at the 1990 NCAA Division I Outdoor Track and Field Championships.

He was drafted by the Atlanta Falcons in the seventh round (172nd overall) of the 1991 NFL draft.
