= Doug Shively =

American football player and coach (1937–2026)

Biographical details
- Born: March 18, 1937; Lexington, Kentucky, U.S.
- Died: March 13, 2026 (aged 88); Hiawassee, Georgia, U.S.

Playing career
- 1956–1958: Kentucky
- Position: End

Coaching career (HC unless noted)
- 1959: Thomas Jefferson HS (TX) (assistant)
- 1960–1965: Virginia Tech (assistant)
- 1966–1968: Kentucky (DE)
- 1970–1972: Clemson (LB)
- 1973: North Carolina (DB)
- 1974–1976: New Orleans Saints (LB)
- 1977–1982: Atlanta Falcons (LB)
- 1983: Arizona Wranglers
- 1984: San Diego Chargers (DL)
- 1985: Tampa Bay Buccaneers (DC/LB)
- 1986–1989: Houston Oilers (DL)
- 1990–1993: Atlanta Falcons (AHC/DEF)

Head coaching record
- Overall: 4–14 (USFL)

Douglas Armstead Shively (March 18, 1937 – March 13, 2026) was an American football player and coach. He was the head coach for the Arizona Wranglers of the United States Football League (USFL) in 1983, compiling an overall record of four wins and 14 losses. Shively also served as an assistant coach in the National Football League (NFL) for 19 seasons, most notably as the defensive coordinator of the Tampa Bay Buccaneers in 1985 and as the assistant head coach for defense of the Atlanta Falcons from 1990 to 1993.

== Early life and career ==
Shively was born and raised in Lexington, Kentucky, where his father, Bernie Shively, was the athletic director at the University of Kentucky from 1938 until his death in 1967. After graduating from high school, Shively enrolled at Kentucky, following in his father's footsteps, who had earned All-America honors as a member of the Fighting Illini football team in 1926. He lettered in football for three years (1956–1958) as well as in baseball.

== Death ==
Shively died in Hiawassee, Georgia, on March 13, 2026, aged 88.

== Head coaching record ==
Year	Team	Overall	Conference	Standing	Bowl/playoffs
Arizona Wranglers (United States Football League) (1983)
1983	Arizona Wranglers	4–14		4th (Pacific Division)	
Total:		4–14			
