= Lists of NFL team seasons =

This is a list of the active National Football League teams' all-time win, loss, tie, and winning percentage records. The teams are listed by year each became active. Updated through the 2025 regular season.

Team	Active since	Regular season record					Postseason record				Achievements			
Team	Active since	G	W	L	T	W%	G	W	L	W%	CHP	SBW	SBG	DIV
Arizona Cardinals	1920	1,463	596	826	41	.421	17	7	10	.412	2	0	1	8
Atlanta Falcons	1966	933	406	521	6	.438	24	10	14	.417	0	0	2	6
Baltimore Ravens	1996	485	276	208	1	.570	32	18	14	.563	2	2	2	8
Buffalo Bills	1960 (AFL)	1,016	498	510	8	.494	45	22	23	.489	2	0	4	15
Carolina Panthers	1995	501	227	273	1	.454	18	9	9	.500	0	0	2	6
Chicago Bears	1920	1,503	809	652	42	.552	39	18	21	.462	9	1	2	23
Cincinnati Bengals	1968 (AFL)	904	409	490	5	.455	26	10	16	.385	0	0	3	11
Cleveland Browns	1946 (AAFC)	1,141	567	560	14	.503	39	17	22	.436	8	0	0	22
Dallas Cowboys	1960	1,015	576	432	7	.571	67	36	31	.537	5	5	8	26
Denver Broncos	1960 (AFL)	1,017	532	475	10	.528	45	24	21	.533	3	3	8	15
Detroit Lions	1930	1,366	615	717	34	.463	23	9	15	.375	4	0	0	10
Green Bay Packers	1921	1,469	819	611	39	.571	65	37	28	.578	13	4	5	29
Houston Texans	2002	389	174	214	1	.449	16	7	9	.438	0	0	0	8
Indianapolis Colts	1953	1,099	572	519	8	.524	48	23	25	.479	4	2	4	19
Jacksonville Jaguars	1995	501	215	286	0	.429	17	8	9	.471	0	0	0	4
Kansas City Chiefs	1960 (AFL)	1,017	553	452	12	.550	45	26	22	.542	5	4	7	17
Las Vegas Raiders	1960 (AFL)	1,017	512	494	11	.509	45	25	20	.556	3	3	5	15
Los Angeles Chargers	1960 (AFL)	1,017	505	501	11	.502	33	12	21	.364	1	0	1	15
Los Angeles Rams	1937	1,268	636	611	21	.510	59	29	30	.492	4	2	5	22
Miami Dolphins	1966 (AFL)	933	511	418	4	.550	43	20	23	.465	2	2	5	13
Minnesota Vikings	1961	1,003	546	446	11	.550	52	21	32	.396	0	0	4	21
New England Patriots	1960 (AFL)	1,017	559	449	9	.554	62	40	22	.645	6	6	11	22
New Orleans Saints	1967	919	423	491	5	.463	23	10	13	.435	1	1	1	9
New York Giants	1925	1,438	728	676	34	.518	51	25	26	.490	8	4	5	23
New York Jets	1960 (AFL)	1,017	436	573	8	.433	25	12	13	.480	1	1	1	4
Philadelphia Eagles	1933	1,321	649	645	27	.502	52	29	27	.518	5	2	5	17
Pittsburgh Steelers	1933	1,305	691	592	22	.538	66	36	30	.545	6	6	8	24
San Francisco 49ers	1946 (AAFC)	1,189	642	531	16	.547	66	40	26	.606	5	5	8	23
Seattle Seahawks	1976	793	416	376	1	.525	38	19	19	.500	1	1	3	11
Tampa Bay Buccaneers	1976	793	326	466	1	.412	24	12	13	.480	2	2	2	10
Tennessee Titans	1960 (AFL)	1,017	482	529	6	.477	40	17	23	.425	2	0	1	11
Washington Commanders	1932	1,335	646	660	29	.495	43	25	21	.543	5	3	5	15
