= List of NFL franchise post-season droughts =

This is a list of current and former National Football League (NFL) franchise droughts (multiple consecutive seasons of not reaching a certain achievement) related to the post-season and Super Bowl. The length of a drought is the number of seasons since the last time a franchise achieved a certain milestone. For a milestone that a franchise has never achieved, the length of the corresponding drought is equal to the number of seasons the franchise has been active.

All 32 active NFL teams have qualified for the playoffs and won at least one playoff game in their history. Of the 12 teams that have never won the Super Bowl, the seven who predate the institution of the game (the Cardinals, Lions, Oilers/Titans, Chargers, Browns, Bills, and Vikings) had all won an NFL or AFL championship prior to the AFL–NFL merger. In the case of the Vikings, however, the Super Bowl existed at the time they won their only league title (in 1969). Thus, the Vikings along with the other five teams (the Falcons, Bengals, Panthers, Jaguars and Texans, whose history is no older than the Super Bowl itself) are the only franchises to have never won the highest championship available to them. The Cardinals own the longest drought since a championship of any kind, at 78 seasons.

Note that for continuity purposes, the Cleveland Browns are officially considered to have suspended operations for the 1996, 1997, and 1998 seasons. Since returning 27 years ago, they have only made the playoffs three times, while the Baltimore Ravens are considered to be a separate team that began play in 1996. The Ravens, as a result of the Cleveland Browns relocation controversy, absorbed the Browns' personnel upon their suspension, but not their history.

== Active team droughts ==
=== Post-season droughts ===
^	Longest drought in team history

Playoff droughts
Team	Last appearance in post-season	Seasons
New York Jets ^	2010 AFC Championship	15
Atlanta Falcons	2017 NFC Divisional	8
Indianapolis Colts	2020 AFC Wild Card	5
New Orleans Saints	2020 NFC Divisional	5
Las Vegas Raiders	2021 AFC Wild Card	4
Arizona Cardinals	2021 NFC Wild Card	4
Tennessee Titans	2021 AFC Divisional	4
New York Giants	2022 NFC Divisional	3
Cincinnati Bengals	2022 AFC Championship	3
Cleveland Browns	2023 AFC Wild Card	2
Miami Dolphins	2023 AFC Wild Card	2
Dallas Cowboys	2023 NFC Wild Card	2
Tampa Bay Buccaneers	2024 NFC Wild Card	1
Minnesota Vikings	2024 NFC Wild Card	1
Baltimore Ravens	2024 AFC Divisional	1
Detroit Lions	2024 NFC Divisional	1
Washington Commanders	2024 NFC Championship	1
Kansas City Chiefs	Super Bowl LIX	1
2025 playoff teams
Los Angeles Chargers	2025 AFC Wild Card	0
Pittsburgh Steelers	2025 AFC Wild Card	0
Jacksonville Jaguars	2025 AFC Wild Card	0
Philadelphia Eagles	2025 NFC Wild Card	0
Green Bay Packers	2025 NFC Wild Card	0
Carolina Panthers	2025 NFC Wild Card	0
Buffalo Bills	2025 AFC Divisional	0
Houston Texans	2025 AFC Divisional	0
Chicago Bears	2025 NFC Divisional	0
San Francisco 49ers	2025 NFC Divisional	0
Denver Broncos	2025 AFC Championship	0
Los Angeles Rams	2025 NFC Championship	0
New England Patriots	Super Bowl LX	0
Seattle Seahawks	Super Bowl LX	0

=== Playoff game victory droughts ===
==== Longest active playoff game victory droughts ====
Sortable table, click on the header arrows.

^	Longest drought in team history
♦	Most consecutive losses in team history
¤	Tied for most consecutive losses in team history

Current playoff losing streak
Seasons since win	Team	Last playoff game win	Loss streak	Playoff losses – teams
25	Miami Dolphins ^	2000 AFC Wild Card	6 ♦	2000 – Oakland; 2001 – Baltimore; 2008 – Baltimore; 2016 – Pittsburgh; 2022 – Buffalo; 2023 – Kansas City
23	Las Vegas Raiders ^	2002 AFC Championship	3 ♦	2002 – Tampa Bay; 2016 – Houston; 2021 – Cincinnati
15	New York Jets ^	2010 AFC Divisional	1	2010 – Pittsburgh
10	Arizona Cardinals	2015 NFC Divisional	2	2015 – Carolina; 2021 – L. A. Rams
10	Carolina Panthers ^	2015 NFC Championship	3 ¤	2015 – Denver; 2017 – New Orleans; 2025 – L. A. Rams
9	Pittsburgh Steelers	2016 AFC Divisional	7 ♦	2016 – New England; 2017 – Jacksonville; 2020 – Cleveland; 2021 – Kansas City; 2023 – Buffalo; 2024 – Baltimore; 2025 – Houston
8	Atlanta Falcons	2017 NFC Wild Card	1	2017 – Philadelphia
7	Indianapolis Colts	2018 AFC Wild Card	2	2018 – Kansas City; 2020 – Buffalo
7	Los Angeles Chargers	2018 AFC Wild Card	4 ¤	2018 – New England; 2022 – Jacksonville; 2024 – Houston; 2025 – New England
6	Minnesota Vikings	2019 NFC Wild Card	3	2019 – San Francisco; 2022 – N. Y. Giants; 2024 – L. A. Rams
6	Tennessee Titans	2019 AFC Divisional	3 ¤	2019 – Kansas City; 2020 – Baltimore; 2021 – Cincinnati
5	Cleveland Browns	2020 AFC Wild Card	2	2020 – Kansas City; 2023 – Houston
5	New Orleans Saints	2020 NFC Wild Card	1	2020 – Tampa Bay
3	Jacksonville Jaguars	2022 AFC Wild Card	2 ¤	2022 – Kansas City; 2025 – Buffalo
3	New York Giants	2022 NFC Wild Card	1	2022 – Philadelphia
3	Dallas Cowboys	2022 NFC Wild Card	2	2022 – San Francisco; 2023 – Green Bay
3	Cincinnati Bengals	2022 AFC Divisional	1	2022 – Kansas City
2	Green Bay Packers	2023 NFC Wild Card	3 ♦	2023 – San Francisco; 2024 – Philadelphia; 2025 – Chicago
2	Tampa Bay Buccaneers	2023 NFC Wild Card	2	2023 – Detroit; 2024 – Washington
2	Detroit Lions	2023 NFC Divisional	2	2023 – San Francisco; 2024 – Washington
1	Baltimore Ravens	2024 AFC Wild Card	1	2024 – Buffalo
1	Washington Commanders	2024 NFC Divisional	1	2024 – Philadelphia
1	Kansas City Chiefs	2024 AFC Championship	1	2024 – Philadelphia
1	Philadelphia Eagles	Super Bowl LIX	1	2025 – San Francisco
2025 playoff winners
0	Buffalo Bills	2025 AFC Wild Card	1	2025 – Denver
0	Houston Texans	2025 AFC Wild Card	1	2025 – New England
0	San Francisco 49ers	2025 NFC Wild Card	1	2025 – Seattle
0	Chicago Bears	2025 NFC Wild Card	1	2025 – L. A. Rams
0	Denver Broncos	2025 AFC Divisional	1	2025 – New England
0	Los Angeles Rams	2025 NFC Divisional	1	2025 – Seattle
0	New England Patriots	2025 AFC Championship	1	2025 – Seattle
0	Seattle Seahawks	Super Bowl LX	0	3-game win streak
Seasons since win	Team	Last playoff game win	Loss streak	Playoff losses – teams

=== AFC/NFC Divisional playoffs game appearance droughts ===
This is also a list of the last time a particular club won a wild card playoff game or had a first-round bye.

♦	First round bye

Drought Reference
Seasons	Team	Last appearance in Divisional playoff game	Result
25	Miami Dolphins	2000 AFC	Lost vs. Oakland
23	Las Vegas Raiders ^{[a]}	2002 AFC♦	Won vs. N. Y. Jets
15	New York Jets	2010 AFC	Won vs. New England
10	Arizona Cardinals	2015 NFC♦	Won vs. Green Bay
10	Carolina Panthers	2015 NFC♦	Won vs. Seattle
8	Atlanta Falcons	2017 NFC	Lost vs. Philadelphia
8	Pittsburgh Steelers	2017 AFC♦	Lost vs. Jacksonville
7	Los Angeles Chargers	2018 AFC	Lost vs. New England
7	Indianapolis Colts	2018 AFC	Lost vs. Kansas City
6	Minnesota Vikings	2019 NFC	Lost vs. San Francisco
5	Cleveland Browns	2020 AFC	Lost vs. Kansas City
5	New Orleans Saints	2020 NFC	Lost vs. Tampa Bay
4	Tennessee Titans	2021 AFC♦	Lost vs. Cincinnati
3	Cincinnati Bengals	2022 AFC	Won vs. Buffalo
3	Jacksonville Jaguars	2022 AFC	Lost vs. Kansas City
3	Dallas Cowboys	2022 NFC	Lost vs. San Francisco
3	New York Giants	2022 NFC	Lost vs. Philadelphia
2	Green Bay Packers	2023 NFC	Lost vs. San Francisco
2	Tampa Bay Buccaneers	2023 NFC	Lost vs. Detroit
1	Baltimore Ravens	2024 AFC	Lost vs. Buffalo
1	Detroit Lions	2024 NFC♦	Lost vs. Washington
1	Kansas City Chiefs	2024 AFC♦	Won vs. Houston
1	Philadelphia Eagles	2024 NFC	Won vs. L. A. Rams
1	Washington Commanders	2024 NFC	Won vs. Detroit
2025 Divisional playoff teams
0	Buffalo Bills	2025 AFC	Lost vs. Denver
0	San Francisco 49ers	2025 NFC	Lost vs. Seattle
0	Houston Texans	2025 AFC	Lost vs. New England
0	Chicago Bears	2025 NFC	Lost vs. L. A. Rams
0	Denver Broncos	2025 AFC♦	Won vs. Buffalo
0	New England Patriots	2025 AFC	Won vs. Houston
0	Seattle Seahawks	2025 NFC♦	Won vs. San Francisco
0	Los Angeles Rams	2025 NFC	Won vs. Chicago

- ^{a} The Las Vegas Raiders last appeared in the AFC Divisional playoff game as the Oakland Raiders.

=== AFC/NFC Championship game appearance droughts ===
This is also a list of the last time a particular club won a divisional playoff game.

^	Longest drought in team history
†	Tied for longest drought in team history

Reference
Seasons	Team	Last appearance in conference championship game	Result
33^{[a]}	Cleveland Browns ^	1989 AFC	Lost vs. Denver
33	Miami Dolphins ^	1992 AFC	Lost vs. Buffalo
30	Dallas Cowboys ^	1995 NFC	Won vs. Green Bay
24	Houston Texans ^	Never (enfranchised 2002)	—
23	Las Vegas Raiders ^^{[b]}	2002 AFC	Won vs. Tennessee
18	Los Angeles Chargers ^^{[c]}	2007 AFC	Lost vs. New England
15	New York Jets	2010 AFC	Lost vs. Pittsburgh
15	Chicago Bears	2010 NFC	Lost vs. Green Bay
14	New York Giants	2011 NFC	Won vs. San Francisco
11	Indianapolis Colts	2014 AFC	Lost vs. New England
10	Arizona Cardinals	2015 NFC	Lost vs. Carolina
10	Carolina Panthers	2015 NFC	Won vs. Arizona
9	Pittsburgh Steelers	2016 AFC	Lost vs. New England
9	Atlanta Falcons	2016 NFC	Won vs. Green Bay
8	Jacksonville Jaguars	2017 AFC	Lost vs. New England
8	Minnesota Vikings	2017 NFC	Lost vs. Philadelphia
7	New Orleans Saints	2018 NFC	Lost vs. L. A. Rams
6	Tennessee Titans	2019 AFC	Lost vs. Kansas City
5	Green Bay Packers	2020 NFC	Lost vs. Tampa Bay
5	Tampa Bay Buccaneers	2020 NFC	Won vs. Green Bay
3	Cincinnati Bengals	2022 AFC	Lost vs. Kansas City
2	Baltimore Ravens	2023 AFC	Lost vs. Kansas City
2	San Francisco 49ers	2023 NFC	Won vs. Detroit
2	Detroit Lions	2023 NFC	Lost vs. San Francisco
1	Buffalo Bills	2024 AFC	Lost vs. Kansas City
1	Washington Commanders	2024 NFC	Lost vs. Philadelphia
1	Kansas City Chiefs	2024 AFC	Won vs. Buffalo
1	Philadelphia Eagles	2024 NFC	Won vs. Washington
2025 Conference finalists
0	Denver Broncos	2025 AFC	Lost vs. New England
0	New England Patriots	2025 AFC	Won vs. Denver
0	Los Angeles Rams	2025 NFC	Lost vs. Seattle
0	Seattle Seahawks	2025 NFC	Won vs. L. A. Rams

- ^{a} The Browns were dormant from 1996–1998. Since returning 28 years ago, the Browns have never played in an AFC Championship Game.
- ^{b} The Las Vegas Raiders last appeared in the AFC Championship Game as the Oakland Raiders.
- ^{c} The Los Angeles Chargers last appeared in the AFC Championship Game as the San Diego Chargers.

=== Super Bowl appearance droughts ===
This is also the last time club won AFC or NFC championship game.

Last appearance in Super Bowl
Seasons	Team	Last appearance	NFL season	Result
60	Detroit Lions	Never (Enfranchised pre-Super Bowl)		—
57	Cleveland Browns^{[a]}	Never (Enfranchised pre-Super Bowl)		—
57	New York Jets	Super Bowl III	1968	Won vs. Baltimore Colts
49	Minnesota Vikings	Super Bowl XI	1976	Lost vs. Oakland
41	Miami Dolphins	Super Bowl XIX	1984	Lost vs. San Francisco
34	Washington Commanders^{[b]}	Super Bowl XXVI	1991	Won vs. Buffalo
32	Buffalo Bills	Super Bowl XXVIII	1993	Lost vs. Dallas
31	Jacksonville Jaguars	Never (enfranchised 1995)		—
31	Los Angeles Chargers^{[c]}	Super Bowl XXIX	1994	Lost vs. San Francisco
30	Dallas Cowboys	Super Bowl XXX	1995	Won vs. Pittsburgh
26	Tennessee Titans	Super Bowl XXXIV	1999	Lost vs. St. Louis Rams
24	Houston Texans	Never (enfranchised 2002)		—
23	Las Vegas Raiders^{[d]}	Super Bowl XXXVII	2002	Lost vs. Tampa Bay
19	Chicago Bears	Super Bowl XLI	2006	Lost vs. Indianapolis
17	Arizona Cardinals	Super Bowl XLIII	2008	Lost vs. Pittsburgh
16	New Orleans Saints	Super Bowl XLIV	2009	Won vs. Indianapolis
16	Indianapolis Colts	Super Bowl XLIV	2009	Lost vs. New Orleans
15	Green Bay Packers	Super Bowl XLV	2010	Won vs. Pittsburgh
15	Pittsburgh Steelers	Super Bowl XLV	2010	Lost vs. Green Bay
14	New York Giants	Super Bowl XLVI	2011	Won vs. New England
13	Baltimore Ravens	Super Bowl XLVII	2012	Won vs. San Francisco
10	Carolina Panthers	Super Bowl 50	2015	Lost vs. Denver
10	Denver Broncos	Super Bowl 50	2015	Won vs. Carolina
9	Atlanta Falcons	Super Bowl LI	2016	Lost vs. New England
5	Tampa Bay Buccaneers	Super Bowl LV	2020	Won vs. Kansas City
4	Cincinnati Bengals	Super Bowl LVI	2021	Lost vs. L. A. Rams
4	Los Angeles Rams	Super Bowl LVI	2021	Won vs. Cincinnati
2	San Francisco 49ers	Super Bowl LVIII	2023	Lost vs. Kansas City
1	Kansas City Chiefs	Super Bowl LIX	2024	Lost vs. Philadelphia
1	Philadelphia Eagles	Super Bowl LIX	2024	Won vs. Kansas City
Super Bowl LX teams
0	New England Patriots	Super Bowl LX	2025	Lost vs. Seattle
0	Seattle Seahawks	Super Bowl LX	2025	Won vs. New England

- ^{a} The Browns are considered to have suspended operation from 1996–1998. Since returning in 1999, or 28 years ago they have never appeared in the Super Bowl, while the franchise that moved in 1995, has made two appearances in the Super Bowl since the relocation controversy.
- ^{b} The Washington Commanders last appeared in the Super Bowl as the Washington Redskins.
- ^{c} The Los Angeles Chargers last appeared in the Super Bowl as the San Diego Chargers.
- ^{d} The Las Vegas Raiders last appeared in the Super Bowl as the Oakland Raiders.

=== Super Bowl or NFL championship win droughts ===
This list also counts all seasons since a team last won the league championship or Super Bowl. Of active NFL teams, 20 have won the Super Bowl, 7 have not won a Super Bowl, but have won an AFL or NFL championship pre-merger, and 5 have not won any championship or Super Bowl.

==== NFL or AFL Championship pre-1970s merger ====
Drought References
Seasons	Team	Last League championship crown pre-merger (1920–1969)	Season
78	Arizona Cardinals^{[a]}	1947 NFL championship	1947
68	Detroit Lions	1957 NFL championship	1957
64	Tennessee Titans^{[b]}	1961 AFL championship	1961
62	Los Angeles Chargers^{[c]}	1963 AFL championship	1963
58^{[d]}	Cleveland Browns	1964 NFL championship	1964
60	Buffalo Bills	1965 AFL championship	1965
56	Minnesota Vikings	1969 NFL championship^{[e]}	1969

- ^{a} Team won as the Chicago Cardinals in 1947.
- ^{b} Team won as the Houston Oilers in 1961.
- ^{c} Team won as the San Diego Chargers in 1963.
- ^{e} Super Bowl was first played in the 1966-67 season, while the final official NFL or AFL championship games pre-AFL-NFL merger were played in 1969.

==== Super Bowl win droughts ====
This list counts all seasons since a team last won the Super Bowl.

Drought References
Seasons	Team	Last Super Bowl crown (1966–present)	Season
60	Arizona Cardinals	Never (Enfranchised pre-Super Bowl)	—
60	Detroit Lions	Never (Enfranchised pre-Super Bowl)	—
60	Buffalo Bills	Never (Enfranchised pre-Super Bowl)	—
60	Tennessee Titans	Never (Enfranchised pre-Super Bowl)	—
60	Los Angeles Chargers	Never (Enfranchised pre-Super Bowl)	—
60	Minnesota Vikings	Never (Enfranchised pre-Super Bowl)	—
60	Atlanta Falcons	Never (enfranchised 1966)	—
58	Cincinnati Bengals	Never (enfranchised 1968)	—
57	Cleveland Browns^{[d]}	Never (Enfranchised pre-Super Bowl)	—
57	New York Jets	Super Bowl III	1968
52	Miami Dolphins	Super Bowl VIII	1973
42	Las Vegas Raiders^{[f]}	Super Bowl XVIII	1983
40	Chicago Bears	Super Bowl XX	1985
34	Washington Commanders^{[g]}	Super Bowl XXVI	1991
31	San Francisco 49ers	Super Bowl XXIX	1994
31	Carolina Panthers	Never (enfranchised 1995)	—
31	Jacksonville Jaguars	Never (enfranchised 1995)	—
30	Dallas Cowboys	Super Bowl XXX	1995
24	Houston Texans	Never (enfranchised 2002)	—
19	Indianapolis Colts	Super Bowl XLI	2006
17	Pittsburgh Steelers	Super Bowl XLIII	2008
16	New Orleans Saints	Super Bowl XLIV	2009
15	Green Bay Packers	Super Bowl XLV	2010
14	New York Giants	Super Bowl XLVI	2011
13	Baltimore Ravens	Super Bowl XLVII	2012
10	Denver Broncos	Super Bowl 50	2015
7	New England Patriots	Super Bowl LIII	2018
5	Tampa Bay Buccaneers	Super Bowl LV	2020
4	Los Angeles Rams	Super Bowl LVI	2021
2	Kansas City Chiefs	Super Bowl LVIII	2023
1	Philadelphia Eagles	Super Bowl LIX	2024
0	Seattle Seahawks	Super Bowl LX	2025

- ^{d} The Browns suspended operation from 1996–1998. Since returning in 1999, or 27 years ago they have never won the Super Bowl, while the franchise that moved in 1995, has won the Super Bowl twice since the relocation controversy.
- ^{f} Team won Super Bowl XVIII as the Los Angeles Raiders.
- ^{g} Team won Super Bowl XXVI as the Washington Redskins

==== Super Bowl crown droughts by division ====
Division	Last Super Bowl crown	Seasons
AFC South	XLI — Colts	19
NFC North	XLV — Packers	15
AFC North	XLVII — Ravens	13
AFC East	LIII — Patriots	7
NFC South	LV — Buccaneers	5
AFC West	LVIII — Chiefs	2
NFC East	LIX — Eagles	1
NFC West	LX — Seahawks	0

==== Cities/regions awaiting first Super Bowl crown ====
Listed according to seasons waited. Current NFL cities/regions only.

Last city to leave list: Philadelphia, 2017 season
City/region	Seasons waited	Conference title(s)	Team(s)	Notes
Detroit	60	None	Detroit Lions (1966–present)	Played in the 1991 and 2023 NFC Championship Games. NFL championship won in 1935, 1952, 1953, and 1957.
Buffalo	60	1990, 1991, 1992, 1993	Buffalo Bills (1966–present)	Played in Super Bowls XXV, XXVI, XXVII, and XXVIII. Last AFL championship won in 1965 (pre-merger). Buffalo's previous NFL franchise, the Buffalo All-Americans, claimed an unrecognized 1921 championship.
Atlanta	60	1998, 2016	Atlanta Falcons (1966–present)	Played in Super Bowls XXXIII and LI.
Minneapolis–St. Paul	60	1969, 1973, 1974, 1976	Minnesota Vikings (1966–present)	Played in Super Bowls IV, VIII, IX, and XI. NFL championship won in 1969 was last title before formal AFL–NFL merger later in 1970.
Cincinnati	58	1981, 1988, 2021	Cincinnati Bengals (1968–present)	Played in Super Bowls XVI, XXIII and LVI. Previous NFL team, the Cincinnati Celts, never won an NFL title.
Cleveland	57	None	Cleveland Browns (1966–1995, 1999–present)	Played in the 1986, 1987, and 1989 AFC Championship Games. Last NFL championship won in 1964 (pre-merger).
Houston	55	None	31 Oilers seasons (1966–1996) and 24 Texans seasons (2002–present)	Played in the 1978 and 1979 AFC Championship Games. The Oilers franchise in Houston won the AFL championship in 1960 and 1961 (pre-merger). To date, the Texans have never played in the AFC championship.
Phoenix	38	2008	Phoenix/Arizona Cardinals (1988–present)	Played in Super Bowl XLIII.
Jacksonville	31	None	Jacksonville Jaguars (1995–present)	Played in the 1996, 1999 and 2017 AFC Championship Games.
Charlotte	31	2003, 2015	Carolina Panthers (1995–present)	Played in Super Bowls XXXVIII and 50.
Nashville	28	1999	Tennessee Oilers/Titans (1998–present)	Played in Super Bowl XXXIV.
Las Vegas	6	None	Las Vegas Raiders (2020–present)	

=== Division title droughts ===
Listed according to seasons waited.

^	Longest drought in team history

Franchise	Most recent division title	Year	Seasons
Cleveland Browns^	AFC Central	1989	33**
Las Vegas Raiders^	AFC West	2002	23
New York Jets	AFC East	2002	23
Miami Dolphins^	AFC East	2008	17
Los Angeles Chargers^	AFC West	2009	16
New York Giants	NFC East	2011	14
Indianapolis Colts	AFC South	2014	11
Arizona Cardinals	NFC West	2015	10
Atlanta Falcons	NFC South	2016	9
Washington Commanders	NFC East	2020	5
New Orleans Saints	NFC South	2020	5
Tennessee Titans	AFC South	2021	4
Green Bay Packers	NFC North	2021	4
Cincinnati Bengals	AFC North	2022	3
Minnesota Vikings	NFC North	2022	3
Dallas Cowboys	NFC East	2023	2
San Francisco 49ers	NFC West	2023	2
Buffalo Bills	AFC East	2024	1
Baltimore Ravens	AFC North	2024	1
Houston Texans	AFC South	2024	1
Kansas City Chiefs	AFC West	2024	1
Detroit Lions	NFC North	2024	1
Tampa Bay Buccaneers	NFC South	2024	1
Los Angeles Rams	NFC West	2024	1
2025 Division champions
New England Patriots	AFC East	2025	0
Pittsburgh Steelers	AFC North	2025	0
Jacksonville Jaguars	AFC South	2025	0
Denver Broncos	AFC West	2025	0
Philadelphia Eagles	NFC East	2025	0
Chicago Bears	NFC North	2025	0
Carolina Panthers	NFC South	2025	0
Seattle Seahawks	NFC West	2025	0

**Does not include the three seasons (1996–1998) during which the franchise suspended operations.

== Historical team droughts ==
=== Closest approaches without winning the Super Bowl ===
Counted from the first Super Bowl season, 1966, to present.

Team	Wild Card ^{[a]} appearances	Divisional ^{[b]} appearances	Conference Championship appearances	Super Bowl appearances	Fewest wins short of Super Bowl title
Minnesota Vikings	16	21	9	4	1 win short: 1969, 1973, 1974, 1976
Buffalo Bills	14	16	7	4	1 win short: 1990, 1991, 1992, 1993
Cincinnati Bengals	11	8	4	3	1 win short: 1981, 1988, 2021
Atlanta Falcons	8	10	4	2	1 win short: 1998, 2016
Carolina Panthers	5	7	4	2	1 win short: 2003, 2015
Tennessee Titans	15	14	5	1	1 win short: 1999
Los Angeles Chargers	11	12	4	1	1 win short: 1994
Arizona Cardinals	6	6	2	1	1 win short: 2008
Cleveland Browns	6	9	5	-	2 wins short: 1968, 1969, 1986, 1987, 1989
Jacksonville Jaguars	8	6	3	-	2 wins short: 1996, 1999, 2017
Detroit Lions	10	5	2	-	2 wins short: 1991, 2023
Houston Texans	9	7	-	-	3 wins short: 2011, 2012, 2016, 2019, 2023, 2024, 2025

- **^{a}** First round in the 1982 playoffs for the Vikings, Bengals, Falcons, Chargers, Cardinals, Browns, and Lions.
- **^{b}** Second round in the 1982 playoffs for the Vikings and Chargers.

=== Longest NFL / AFL / Super Bowl championship droughts through history ===
This list only shows droughts of 30 or more seasons for teams. A championship is considered as winning an NFL Championship (1920—1969), AFL Championship (1960—1969), or Super Bowl Championship (1966—present). Active droughts are listed in bold type.

Seasons	Team	Previous title	Drought streak	Next title
**78**	**Chicago/St. Louis/Phoenix/Arizona Cardinals**	**1947**	**1948—present**	—
**68**	**Detroit Lions**	**1957**	**1958—present**	—
**64**	**Houston/Tennessee Oilers/Titans**	**1961**	**1962—present**	—
**62**	**San Diego/Los Angeles Chargers**	**1963**	**1964—present**	—
**60**	**Atlanta Falcons**	—	**1966—present**	—
**60**	**Buffalo Bills**	**1965**	**1966—present**	—
**58**	**Cleveland Browns**	**1964**	**1965—1995, 1999—present**	—
**58**	**Cincinnati Bengals**	—	**1968—present**	—
**57**	**New York Jets**	**1968**	**1969—present**	—
56	Philadelphia Eagles	1960	1961—2016	2017
**56**	**Minnesota Vikings**	**1969**	**1970—present**	—
**52**	**Miami Dolphins**	**1973**	**1974—present**	—
49	Kansas City Chiefs	1969	1970—2018	2019
47	Los Angeles/St. Louis Rams	1951	1952—1998	1999
**42**	**Los Angeles/Oakland/Las Vegas Raiders**	**1983**	**1984—present**	—
42	New Orleans Saints	—	1967—2008	2009
41	Pittsburgh Pirates/Steelers	—	1933—1973	1974
41	Boston/New England Patriots	—	1960—2000	2001
**40**	**Chicago Bears**	**1985**	**1986—present**	—
39	Washington Redskins	1942	1943—1981	1982
37	Denver Broncos	—	1960—1996	1997
37	Seattle Seahawks	—	1976—2012	2013
34	Baltimore/Indianapolis Colts	1970	1971—2005	2006
**34**	**Washington Redskins/Football Team/Commanders**	**1991**	**1992—present**	—
**31**	**San Francisco 49ers**	**1994**	**1995—present**	—
**31**	**Carolina Panthers**	—	**1995—present**	—
**31**	**Jacksonville Jaguars**	—	**1995—present**	—
**30**	**Dallas Cowboys**	**1995**	**1996—present**	—

=== Longest NFL / AFL / Super Bowl championship appearance droughts through history ===
This list only shows droughts of 30 or more seasons for teams. A championship appearance is listed as appearing in an NFL Championship (1932—1969), AFL Championship (1960—1969), or Super Bowl Championship (1966—present). Active droughts are listed in bold type.

Seasons	Team	Previous appearance	Drought streak	Next appearance
**68**	**Detroit Lions**	**1957**	**1958—present**	—
60	Chicago/St. Louis/Phoenix/Arizona Cardinals	1947	1948—2007	2008
**57**	**New York Jets**	**1968**	**1969—present**	—
**53**	**Cleveland Browns**	**1969**	**1970—1995, 1999—present**	—
49	Kansas City Chiefs	1969	1970—2018	2019
**49**	**Minnesota Vikings**	**1976**	**1977—present**	—
42	New Orleans Saints	—	1967—2008	2009
41	Pittsburgh Pirates/Steelers	—	1933—1973	1974
**41**	**Miami Dolphins**	**1984**	**1985—present**	—
36	Houston/Tennessee Oilers/Titans	1962	1963—1998	1999
35	Baltimore/Indianapolis Colts	1970	1971—2005	2006
**34**	**Washington Redskins/Football Team/Commanders**	**1991**	**1992—present**	—
32	Atlanta Falcons	—	1966—1997	1998
32	Cincinnati Bengals	1988	1989—2020	2021
**32**	**Buffalo Bills**	**1993**	**1994—present**	—
**31**	**San Diego/Los Angeles Chargers**	**1994**	**1995—present**	—
**31**	**Jacksonville Jaguars**	—	**1995—present**	—
31	San Francisco 49ers	—	1950—1980	1981
**30**	**Dallas Cowboys**	**1995**	**1996—present**	—

=== Most consecutive post-season losses in team history ===
This is a sortable table of all 32 current NFL teams. Ten teams have multiple losing streaks where they lost an equal number of post season games before breaking the drought.

Updated through the 2025–26 playoffs

^	Denotes active drought

Team	Streak lasted	Last win	Games lost	Playoff losses	Opponent	Next win
Arizona Cardinals	51 years	1947 NFL Championship	4	1948 NFL Champ. 1974 Divisional; 1975 Divisional; 1982 1st Round	Eagles; Vikings; Rams; Packers	1998 Wild Card
Atlanta Falcons	8 years	2004 Divisional	4	2004 NFC Champ. 2008 Wild Card; 2010 Divisional; 2011 Wild Card	Eagles; Cardinals; Packers; Giants	2012 Divisional
Baltimore Ravens; 2 (3 loss) streaks	7 years	2001 Wild Card	3	2001 Divisional; 2003 Wild Card; 2006 Divisional	Steelers; Titans; Colts	2008 Wild Card
Baltimore Ravens; 2 (3 loss) streaks	5 years	2014 Wild Card	3	2014 Divisional; 2018 Wild Card; 2019 Divisional	Patriots; Chargers; Titans	2020 Wild Card
Buffalo Bills	24 years	1995 Wild Card	6	1995 Divisional; 1996 Wild Card; 1998 Wild Card; 1999 Wild Card; 2017 Wild Card; 2019 Wild Card	Steelers; Jaguars; Dolphins; Titans; Jaguars; Texans	2020 Wild Card
Carolina Panthers ^ 2 (3 loss) streaks	8 years	2005 Divisional	3	2005 NFC Champ. 2008 Divisional; 2013 Divisional	Seahawks; Cardinals; 49ers	2014 Wild Card
Carolina Panthers ^ 2 (3 loss) streaks	10 years	2015 NFC Championship	3	Super Bowl 50; 2017 Wild Card; 2025 Wild Card	Broncos; Saints; Rams	TBD
Chicago Bears; 2 (3 loss) streaks	12 years	1994 Wild Card	3	1994 Divisional; 2001 Divisional; 2005 Divisional	49ers Eagles; Panthers	2006 Divisional
Chicago Bears; 2 (3 loss) streaks	15 years	2010 Divisional	3	2010 NFC Champ. 2018 Wild Card; 2020 Wild Card	Packers; Eagles; Saints	2025 Wild Card
Cincinnati Bengals	31 years	1990 Wild Card	8	1990 Divisional; 2005 Wild Card; 2009 Wild Card; 2011 Wild Card; 2012 Wild Card; 2013 Wild Card; 2014 Wild Card; 2015 Wild Card	Raiders; Steelers; Jets; Texans; Texans; Chargers; Colts; Steelers	2021 Wild Card
Cleveland Browns	17 years	1969 NFL Eastern Conference	6	1969 NFL Champ. 1971 Divisional; 1972 Divisional; 1980 Divisional; 1982 1st Round; 1985 Divisional	Vikings; Colts; Dolphins; Raiders; Raiders; Dolphins	1986 Divisional
Dallas Cowboys	13 years	1996 Wild Card	6	1996 Divisional; 1998 Wild Card; 1999 Wild Card; 2003 Wild Card; 2006 Wild Card; 2007 Divisional	Panthers; Cardinals; Vikings; Panthers; Seahawks; Giants	2009 Wild Card
Denver Broncos	9 years	1977 AFC Championship	5	Super Bowl XII; 1978 Divisional; 1979 Wild Card; 1983 Wild Card; 1984 Divisional	Cowboys; Steelers; Oilers; Seahawks; Steelers	1986 Divisional
Detroit Lions	32 years	1991 Divisional	9	1991 NFC Champ. 1993 Wild Card; 1994 Wild Card; 1995 Wild Card; 1997 Wild Card; 1999 Wild Card; 2011 Wild Card; 2014 Wild Card; 2016 Wild Card	Redskins; Packers; Packers; Eagles; Buccaneers; Redskins; Saints; Cowboys; Seahawks	2023 Wild Card
Green Bay Packers ^	2 years	2023 Wild Card	3	2023 Divisional; 2024 Wild Card; 2025 Wild Card	49ers Eagles; Bears	TBD
Houston Texans; 2 (2 loss) streaks	4 years	2012 Wild Card	2	2012 Divisional; 2015 Wild Card	Patriots; Chiefs	2016 Wild Card
Houston Texans; 2 (2 loss) streaks	2 years	2016 Wild Card	2	2016 Divisional; 2018 Wild Card	Patriots; Colts	2019 Wild Card
Indianapolis Colts; 2 (5 loss) streaks	24 years	1971 Divisional	5	1971 AFC Champ. 1975 Divisional; 1976 Divisional; 1977 Divisional; 1987 Divisional	Dolphins; Steelers; Steelers; Raiders; Browns	1995 Wild Card
Indianapolis Colts; 2 (5 loss) streaks	8 years	1995 Divisional	5	1995 AFC Champ. 1996 Wild Card; 1999 Divisional; 2000 Wild Card; 2002 Wild Card	Steelers; Steelers; Titans; Dolphins; Jets	2003 Wild Card
Jacksonville Jaguars ^ 3 (2 loss) streaks	2 years	1996 Divisional	2	1996 AFC Champ. 1997 Wild Card	Patriots; Broncos	1998 Wild Card
Jacksonville Jaguars ^ 3 (2 loss) streaks	8 years	1999 Divisional	2	1999 AFC Champ. 2005 Wild Card	Titans; Patriots	2007 Wild Card
Jacksonville Jaguars ^ 3 (2 loss) streaks	3 years	2022 Wild Card	2	2022 Divisional; 2025 Wild Card	Chiefs; Bills	TBD
Kansas City Chiefs	21 years	1993 Divisional	8	1993 AFC Champ. 1994 Wild Card; 1995 Divisional; 1997 Divisional; 2003 Divisional; 2006 Wild Card; 2010 Wild Card; 2013 Wild Card	Bills; Dolphins; Colts; Broncos; Colts; Colts; Ravens; Colts	2015 Wild Card
Las Vegas Raiders ^	23 years	2002 AFC Championship	3	Super Bowl XXXVII; 2016 Wild Card; 2021 Wild Card	Buccaneers; Texans; Bengals	TBD
Los Angeles Chargers ^ 2 (4 loss) streaks	13 years	1994 AFC Championship	4	Super Bowl XXIX; 1995 Wild Card; 2004 Wild Card; 2006 Divisional	49ers Colts; Jets; Patriots	2007 Wild Card
Los Angeles Chargers ^ 2 (4 loss) streaks	7 years	2018 Wild Card	4	2018 Divisional; 2022 Wild Card; 2024 Wild Card; 2025 Wild Card	Patriots; Jaguars; Texans; Patriots	TBD
Los Angeles Rams	23 years	1951 NFL Championship	5	1952 Nat. Conf. 1955 NFL Champ. 1967 NFL W Conf. 1969 NFL W Conf. 1973 Divisional	Lions; Browns; Packers; Vikings; Cowboys	1974 Divisional
Miami Dolphins ^	25 years	2000 Wild Card	6	2000 Divisional; 2001 Wild Card; 2008 Wild Card; 2016 Wild Card; 2022 Wild Card; 2023 Wild Card	Raiders; Ravens; Ravens; Steelers; Bills; Chiefs	TBD
Minnesota Vikings	9 years	1988 Wild Card	6	1988 Divisional; 1989 Divisional; 1992 Wild Card; 1993 Wild Card; 1994 Wild Card; 1996 Wild Card	49ers 49ers Redskins; Giants; Bears; Cowboys	1997 Wild Card
New England Patriots	22 years	1963 AFL Divisional	4	1963 AFL Champ. 1976 Divisional; 1978 Divisional; 1982 1st Round	Chargers; Raiders; Oilers; Dolphins	1985 Wild Card
New Orleans Saints	32 years	1967 Enfranchised; No Playoff Wins until 2000	4	1987 Wild Card; 1990 Wild Card; 1991 Wild Card; 1992 Wild Card	Vikings; Bears; Falcons; Eagles	2000 Wild Card
New York Giants	18 years	1938 NFL Championship	6	1939 NFL Champ. 1941 NFL Champ. 1943 East Divisional; 1944 NFL Champ. 1946 NFL Champ. 1950 Am. Conf.	Packers; Bears; Redskins; Packers; Bears; Browns	1956 NFL Championship
New York Jets; 5 (2 loss) streaks	14 years	1968; Super Bowl III	2	1969 AFL Divisional; 1981 Wild Card	Chiefs; Bills	1982 First Round
New York Jets; 5 (2 loss) streaks	4 years	1982 Second Round	2	1982 AFC Champ. 1985 Wild Card	Dolphins; Patriots	1986 Wild Card
New York Jets; 5 (2 loss) streaks	12 years	1986 Wild Card	2	1986 Divisional; 1991 Wild Card	Browns; Oilers	1998 Divisional
New York Jets; 5 (2 loss) streaks	4 years	1998 Divisional	2	1998 AFC Champ. 2001 Wild Card	Broncos; Raiders	2002 Wild Card
New York Jets; 5 (2 loss) streaks	5 years	2004 Wild Card	2	2004 Divisional; 2006 Wild Card	Steelers; Patriots	2009 Wild Card
Philadelphia Eagles	12 years	1980 NFC Championship	5	Super Bowl XV; 1981 Wild Card; 1988 Divisional; 1989 Wild Card; 1990 Wild Card	Raiders; Giants; Bears; Rams; Redskins	1992 Wild Card
Pittsburgh Steelers ^	9 years	2016 Divisional	7	2016 AFC Champ. 2017 Divisional; 2020 Wild Card; 2021 Wild Card; 2023 Wild Card; 2024 Wild Card; 2025 Wild Card	Patriots; Jaguars; Browns; Chiefs; Bills; Ravens; Texans	TBD
San Francisco 49ers	4 years	1984; Super Bowl XIX	3	1985 Wild Card; 1986 Divisional; 1987 Divisional	Giants; Giants; Vikings	1988 Divisional
Seattle Seahawks	21 years	1984 Wild Card	6	1984 Divisional; 1987 Wild Card; 1988 Divisional; 1999 Wild Card; 2003 Wild Card; 2004 Wild Card	Dolphins; Oilers; Bengals; Dolphins; Packers; Rams	2005 Divisional
Tampa Bay Buccaneers; 2 (3 loss) streaks	18 years	1979 Divisional	3	1979 NFC Champ. 1981 Divisional; 1982 1st Round	Rams; Cowboys; Cowboys	1997 Wild Card
Tampa Bay Buccaneers; 2 (3 loss) streaks	3 years	1999 Divisional	3	1999 NFC Champ. 2000 Wild Card; 2001 Wild Card	Rams; Eagles; Eagles	2002 Divisional
Tennessee Titans ^ 5 (3 loss) streaks	17 years	1961 AFL Championship	3	1962 AFL Champ. 1967 AFL Champ. 1969 AFL Divisional	Dallas Texans; Raiders; Raiders	1978 Wild Card
Tennessee Titans ^ 5 (3 loss) streaks	3 years	1988 Wild Card	3	1988 Divisional; 1989 Wild Card; 1990 Wild Card	Bills; Steelers; Bengals	1991 Wild Card
Tennessee Titans ^ 5 (3 loss) streaks	8 years	1991 Wild Card	3	1991 Divisional; 1992 Wild Card; 1993 Divisional	Broncos; Bills; Chiefs	1999 Wild Card
Tennessee Titans ^ 5 (3 loss) streaks	13 years	2003 Wild Card	3	2003 Divisional; 2007 Wild Card; 2008 Divisional	Patriots; Chargers; Ravens	2017 Wild Card
Tennessee Titans ^ 5 (3 loss) streaks	6 years	2019 Divisional	3	2019 AFC Champ. 2020 Wild Card; 2021 Divisional	Chiefs; Ravens; Bengals	TBD
Washington Commanders	19 years	2005 Wild Card	5	2005 Divisional; 2007 Wild Card; 2012 Wild Card; 2015 Wild Card; 2020 Wild Card	Seahawks; Seahawks; Seahawks; Packers; Buccaneers	2024 Wild Card
Team	Streak lasted	Last win	Games lost	Playoff games	Opponent	Next win

=== Longest post-season droughts in team history ===
Note that the NFL did not institute a permanent playoff tournament until 1967 and that the NFL Championship Game and any impromptu one-game playoffs (played only in the event of a tie atop the division standings) were the only postseason matchups in this era. The Bert Bell Benefit Bowl (aka the Playoff Bowl; 1960–1969) is considered an exhibition game for the purpose of this list.

Updated through 2025-26 playoffs

^	Denotes active streak

No post season appearances
Team	Longest streak with no post-season appearances	Seasons
Washington Commanders	1946–1970	25
Arizona Cardinals	1949–1973	25
Pittsburgh Steelers	1948–1971	24
New Orleans Saints	1967–1986	20
Denver Broncos	1960–1976	17
Philadelphia Eagles	1961–1977	17
New York Giants	1964–1980	17
Buffalo Bills	2000–2016	17
Cleveland Browns	2003–2019	17
Detroit Lions	1936–1951	16
Green Bay Packers	1945–1959	15
New York Jets	2011–present^	15
Kansas City Chiefs	1972–1985	14
Tampa Bay Buccaneers	1983–1996	14
Cincinnati Bengals	1991–2004	14
Chicago Bears	1964–1976	13
Los Angeles Chargers	1966–1978	13
Las Vegas Raiders	2003–2015	13
San Francisco 49ers	1958–1969	12
New England Patriots	1964–1975	12
Atlanta Falcons	1966–1977	12
Los Angeles Rams	2005–2016	12
Seattle Seahawks	1989–1998	10
Indianapolis Colts	1978–1986	9
Houston Texans	2002–2010	9
Jacksonville Jaguars	2008–2016	9
Tennessee Titans	1970–1977 2009–2016	8
Minnesota Vikings	1961–1967	7
Miami Dolphins	2009–2015	7
Carolina Panthers	2018–2024	7
Dallas Cowboys	1960–1965	6
Baltimore Ravens	1996–1999	4
Team	Longest streak with no post-season appearances	Seasons

No post season victories
Team	Longest streak with no post-season victories	Seasons
Arizona Cardinals	1948–1997	50
Pittsburgh Steelers	1933–1971	39
Detroit Lions	1958–1990	33
New Orleans Saints	1967–1999	33
Cincinnati Bengals	1991–2020	30
Washington Commanders	1944–1971	28
Miami Dolphins^	2001–present^	25
Buffalo Bills	1996–2019	24
Indianapolis Colts	1972–1994	23
Las Vegas Raiders^	2003–present^	23
Los Angeles Rams	1952–1973	22
New York Giants	1959–1980	22
Cleveland Browns	1995, 1999–2019	22
New England Patriots	1964–1984	21
Kansas City Chiefs	1970–1990; 1994–2014	21
San Francisco 49ers	1950–1969	20
Chicago Bears	1964–1983	20
Seattle Seahawks	1985–2004	20
Philadelphia Eagles	1961–1978	18
Denver Broncos	1960–1976	17
Tampa Bay Buccaneers	1980–1996 2003–2019	17
Green Bay Packers	1945–1960	16
Tennessee Titans	1962–1977	16
Los Angeles Chargers	1964–1979	16
New York Jets	2011–present^	15
Atlanta Falcons	1966–1977; 1979–1990	12
Dallas Cowboys	1997–2008	12
Carolina Panthers	2016–present^	10
Houston Texans	2002–2010	9
Jacksonville Jaguars	2008–2016	9
Minnesota Vikings	1961–1968; 1989–1996	8
Baltimore Ravens	2002–2007	6
Team	Longest streak with no post-season victories	Seasons

== See also ==
- List of NFL franchise post-season streaks
- List of last undefeated NFL teams by season
- List of MLB franchise post-season droughts
- List of NHL franchise post-season droughts
- List of MLS club post-season droughts
- List of NBA franchise postseason droughts
