= List of Cincinnati Bengals seasons =

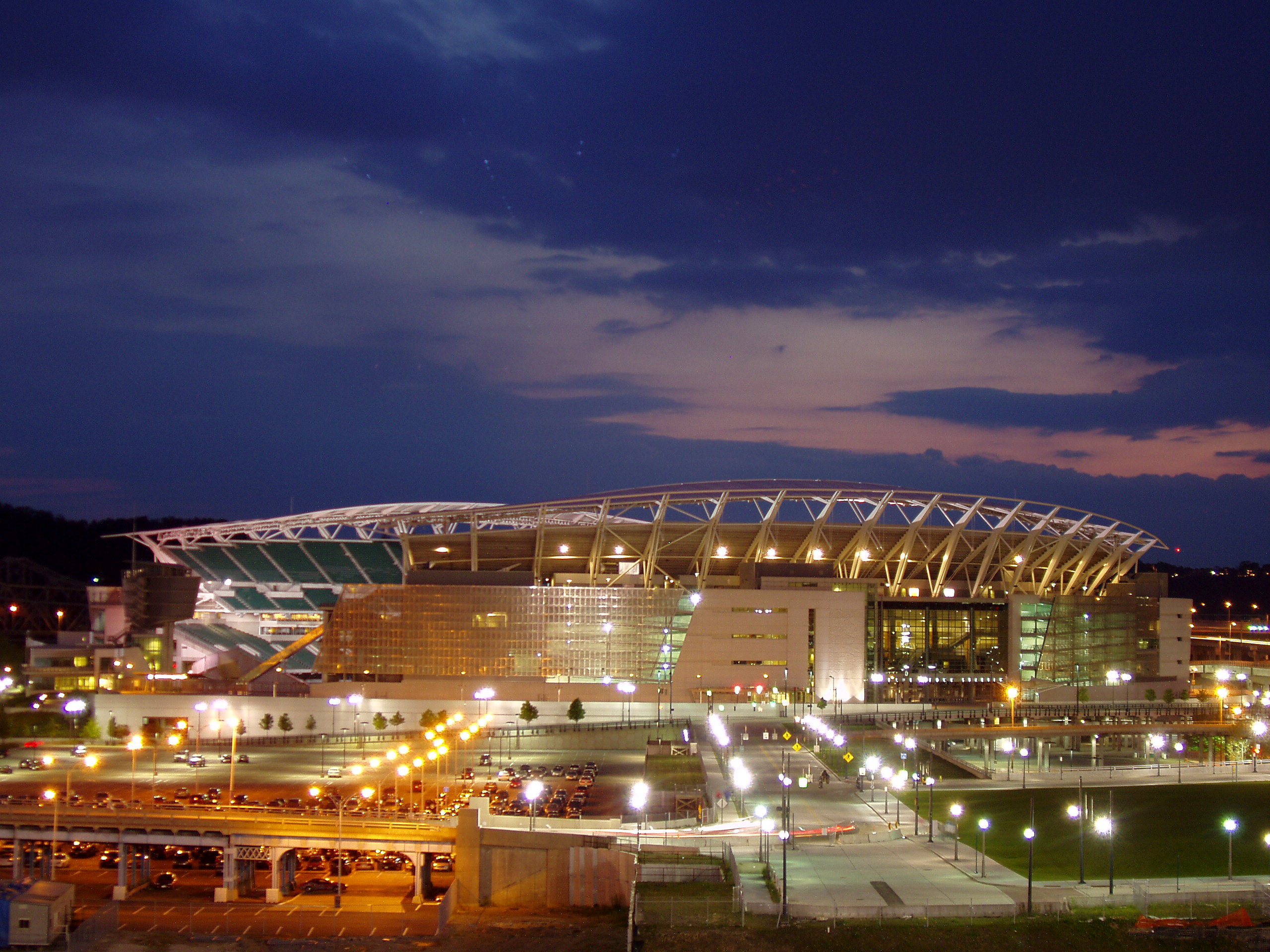
Paycor Stadium, home of the Bengals since 2000.

The Cincinnati Bengals franchise was founded in 1968 as a member of the West division of the American Football League (AFL). The Bengals joined the National Football League (NFL) as a result of the AFL–NFL merger before 1970. This list documents the franchise's completed seasons from 1968 to present, including postseason records and results from postseason games. The Bengals have played over 850 games in their history, including three conference championships, ten division championships, and fifteen playoff appearances. As of the end of the 2023 season, the only NFL teams who have more Super Bowl appearances with no titles than Cincinnati (which has 3 of them) are the 4-time Super Bowl non-winning Buffalo Bills and Minnesota Vikings.

The franchise has experienced several extended periods of success in their history. These periods came from 1981 to 1990 when the Bengals qualified for the playoffs four times and played in two Super Bowls, and from 2009 to 2015. However, during a fourteen-year span—1991 to 2004—the Bengals did not qualify for the playoffs. During this time, the franchise had nine seasons with ten or more losses, and three of those seasons the franchise had the league's worst record. Between 2005 and 2015, the Bengals were more successful, posting seven winning seasons, three division titles and seven wild card playoff berths (including a streak of five consecutive playoff seasons, a first in franchise history). Despite the success, the Bengals did not win a playoff game between 1990 and 2021, one of the longest droughts in league history. From 2016 to 2020, the Bengals suffered five straight losing seasons, including having the league's worst record in the 2019 season (finishing 2–14 that season), before winning the AFC North and qualifying for the playoffs again in 2021, which included an AFC Championship Game win and a berth in their first Super Bowl since the 1988 season.

== Seasons ==
Finish	Final position in league, division or conference
	Super Bowl champions^{†}
	AFC champions^{*}
	Division champions^{^}
	Wild Card berth^{#}

Season	Team	League	Conference	Division	Regular season				Postseason results	Awards	Head coach
Season	Team	League	Conference	Division	Finish	W	L	T	Postseason results	Awards	Head coach
1968	1968	AFL	—N/a	Western	5th	3	11	0		Paul Robinson (OROY)	Paul Brown
1969	1969	AFL	—N/a	Western	5th	4	9	1		Paul Brown (COY); Greg Cook (OROY)	Paul Brown
1970	1970	NFL	AFC	Central^{^}	1st^{^}	8	6	0	Lost Divisional Playoffs (at Colts) 0–17	Paul Brown (COY)	Paul Brown
1971	1971	NFL	AFC	Central	4th	4	10	0			Paul Brown
1972	1972	NFL	AFC	Central	3rd	8	6	0			Paul Brown
1973	1973	NFL	AFC	Central^{^}	1st^{^}	10	4	0	Lost Divisional Playoffs (at Dolphins) 16–34		Paul Brown
1974	1974	NFL	AFC	Central	2nd	7	7	0			Paul Brown
1975	1975	NFL	AFC	Central	2nd^{#}	11	3	0	Lost Divisional Playoffs (at Raiders) 28–31	Ken Anderson (WPMOY)	Paul Brown
1976	1976	NFL	AFC	Central	2nd	10	4	0			Bill Johnson
1977	1977	NFL	AFC	Central	3rd	8	6	0			Bill Johnson
1978	1978	NFL	AFC	Central	4th	4	12	0			Bill Johnson (0–5) Homer Rice (4–7)
1979	1979	NFL	AFC	Central	4th	4	12	0			Homer Rice
1980	1980	NFL	AFC	Central	4th	6	10	0			Forrest Gregg
1981	1981	NFL	AFC^{*}	Central^{^}	1st^{^}	12	4	0	Won Divisional Playoffs (Bills) 28–21; Won AFC Championship (Chargers) 27–7; Lost Super Bowl XVI (vs. 49ers) 21–26	Ken Anderson (MVP, OPOY, CPOY); Paul Brown (EOY)	Forrest Gregg
1982	1982^{[a]}	NFL	AFC	—N/a	3rd^{#}	7	2	0	Lost First Round Playoffs (Jets) 17–44		Forrest Gregg
1983	1983	NFL	AFC	Central	3rd	7	9	0			Forrest Gregg
1984	1984	NFL	AFC	Central	2nd	8	8	0		Brian Pillman (EBCA)	Sam Wyche
1985	1985	NFL	AFC	Central	2nd	7	9	0		Eddie Brown (OROY)	Sam Wyche
1986	1986	NFL	AFC	Central	2nd	10	6	0		Reggie Williams (WPMOY)	Sam Wyche
1987	1987^{[b]}	NFL	AFC	Central	4th	4	11	0			Sam Wyche
1988	1988	NFL	AFC^{*}	Central^{^}	1st^{^}	12	4	0	Won Divisional Playoffs (Seahawks) 21–13; Won AFC Championship (Bills) 21–10; Lost Super Bowl XXIII (vs. 49ers) 16–20	Boomer Esiason (MVP)	Sam Wyche
1989	1989	NFL	AFC	Central	4th	8	8	0			Sam Wyche
1990	1990	NFL	AFC	Central^{^}	1st^{^}	9	7	0	Won Wild Card Playoffs (Oilers) 41–14; Lost Divisional Playoffs (at Raiders) 10–20		Sam Wyche
1991	1991	NFL	AFC	Central	4th	3	13	0		Anthony Muñoz (WPMOY)	Sam Wyche
1992	1992	NFL	AFC	Central	4th	5	11	0		Carl Pickens (OROY)	Dave Shula
1993	1993	NFL	AFC	Central	4th	3	13	0			Dave Shula
1994	1994	NFL	AFC	Central	3rd	3	13	0			Dave Shula
1995	1995	NFL	AFC	Central	2nd	7	9	0			Dave Shula
1996	1996	NFL	AFC	Central	3rd	8	8	0			Dave Shula (1–6) Bruce Coslet (7–2)
1997	1997	NFL	AFC	Central	4th	7	9	0			Bruce Coslet
1998	1998	NFL	AFC	Central	5th	3	13	0			Bruce Coslet
1999	1999	NFL	AFC	Central	5th	4	12	0			Bruce Coslet
2000	2000	NFL	AFC	Central	5th	4	12	0			Bruce Coslet (0–3) Dick LeBeau (4–9)
2001	2001	NFL	AFC	Central	6th	6	10	0			Dick LeBeau
2002	2002	NFL	AFC	North	4th	2	14	0			Dick LeBeau
2003	2003	NFL	AFC	North	2nd	8	8	0		Jon Kitna (CPOY)	Marvin Lewis
2004	2004	NFL	AFC	North	3rd	8	8	0			Marvin Lewis
2005	2005	NFL	AFC	North^{^}	1st^{^}	11	5	0	Lost Wild Card Playoffs (Steelers) 17–31		Marvin Lewis
2006	2006	NFL	AFC	North	2nd	8	8	0			Marvin Lewis
2007	2007	NFL	AFC	North	3rd	7	9	0			Marvin Lewis
2008	2008	NFL	AFC	North	3rd	4	11	1			Marvin Lewis
2009	2009	NFL	AFC	North^{^}	1st^{^}	10	6	0	Lost Wild Card Playoffs (Jets) 14–24	Marvin Lewis (COY)	Marvin Lewis
2010	2010	NFL	AFC	North	4th	4	12	0			Marvin Lewis
2011	2011	NFL	AFC	North	3rd^{#}	9	7	0	Lost Wild Card Playoffs (at Texans) 10–31		Marvin Lewis
2012	2012	NFL	AFC	North	2nd^{#}	10	6	0	Lost Wild Card Playoffs (at Texans) 13–19		Marvin Lewis
2013	2013	NFL	AFC	North^{^}	1st^{^}	11	5	0	Lost Wild Card Playoffs (Chargers) 10–27		Marvin Lewis
2014	2014	NFL	AFC	North	2nd^{#}	10	5	1	Lost Wild Card Playoffs (at Colts) 10–26		Marvin Lewis
2015	2015	NFL	AFC	North^{^}	1st^{^}	12	4	0	Lost Wild Card Playoffs (Steelers) 16–18		Marvin Lewis
2016	2016	NFL	AFC	North	3rd	6	9	1			Marvin Lewis
2017	2017	NFL	AFC	North	3rd	7	9	0			Marvin Lewis
2018	2018	NFL	AFC	North	4th	6	10	0			Marvin Lewis
2019	2019	NFL	AFC	North	4th	2	14	0			Zac Taylor
2020	2020	NFL	AFC	North	4th	4	11	1			Zac Taylor
2021	2021	NFL	AFC^{*}	North^{^}	1st^{^}	10	7	0	Won Wild Card Playoffs (Raiders) 26−19; Won Divisional Playoffs (at Titans) 19–16; Won AFC Championship (at Chiefs) 27–24 (OT); Lost Super Bowl LVI (vs. Rams) 20–23	Ja'Marr Chase (OROY); Joe Burrow (CPOY); Duke Tobin (EOY)	Zac Taylor
2022	2022	NFL	AFC	North^{^}	1st^{^}	12	4	0	Won Wild Card Playoffs (Ravens) 24–17; Won Divisional Playoffs (at Bills) 27–10; Lost AFC Championship (at Chiefs) 20–23		Zac Taylor
2023	2023	NFL	AFC	North	4th	9	8	0			Zac Taylor
2024	2024	NFL	AFC	North	3rd	9	8	0		Joe Burrow (CPOY)	Zac Taylor
2025	2025	NFL	AFC	North	3rd	6	11	0			Zac Taylor
Totals						409	490	5	All-time regular season record (1968–2025)		
Totals						10	16	—	All-time postseason record (1968–2025)		
Totals						419	506	5	All-time regular season and postseason record (1968–2025)		
Totals						3 AFC Conference Championships, 11 Division titles					

== Footnotes ==
- ^{a} The 1982 season was a strike-shortened season so the league was divided up into two conferences instead of its normal divisional alignment.
- ^{b} The strike of 1987 reduced the regular season schedule from 16 to 15 games.
