= List of New Orleans Saints seasons =

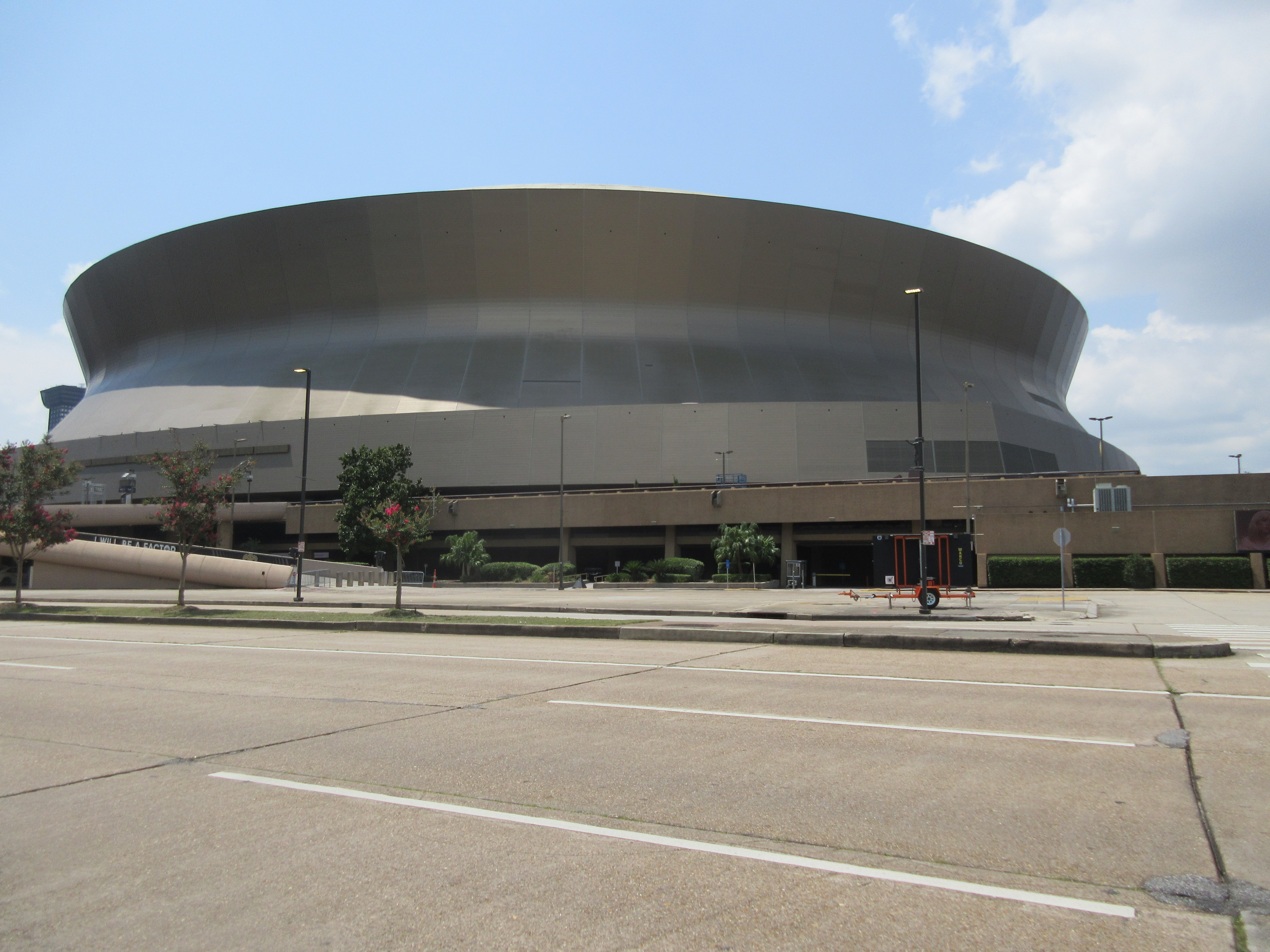
The New Orleans Saints have played their home games at the Caesars Superdome since 1975.

The New Orleans Saints are a professional American football team based in New Orleans, Louisiana. The Saints compete in the National Football League (NFL) as a member of the National Football Conference (NFC) South Division. The NFL awarded the city of New Orleans the sixteenth franchise in the league on November 1, 1966, All Saints' Day, five months after the 89th United States Congress approved the merger of the NFL with the American Football League (AFL). In January 1967, the team was given the name "New Orleans Saints", and began playing in their first season in September of that year. Throughout the franchise's history, it has always been based in New Orleans. Home games were originally played at Tulane Stadium from 1967 to 1974. The team relocated its home games to its current stadium, the Caesars Superdome (originally Louisiana Superdome from 1975 to 2011 and later Mercedes-Benz Superdome from 2011 to 2021), in 1975. The Saints were owned by oilman John W. Mecom Jr. from 1966 to 1985, when the team was sold to Tom Benson. He remained owner until his death in 2018, at which point primary ownership of the team passed to his wife Gayle Benson. She has since made arrangements with the NFL to sell the team and keep the Saints in New Orleans when she dies.

Over their 59 seasons in the NFL, the Saints have accumulated a record of 423 wins, 491 losses, and 5 ties, which is the tenth-worst all-time regular season record among active franchises. (Note: In terms of win-loss percentage) They have also made the playoffs fourteen times and have the ninth-worst playoff record with 10 wins and 13 losses. The Saints won their first and only Super Bowl championship in 2010 when the team defeated the Indianapolis Colts in Super Bowl XLIV. In addition to their Super Bowl win, the Saints have won the NFC Championship once and a division title nine times, winning the NFC West twice (1991 and 2000) and the NFC South seven times (2006, 2009, 2011, 2017, 2018, 2019, and 2020). The team currently has eighteen winning seasons, seven 8–8 seasons, and thirty-three losing seasons. The Saints did not have their first winning season until 1987, their twenty-first season in the league. That same season, the Saints made their first playoff appearance. During the team's worst season in 1980 (in terms of win-loss percentage), the fans began to wear paper bags over their heads to games and started to call the team the "'Aints".

== Seasons ==
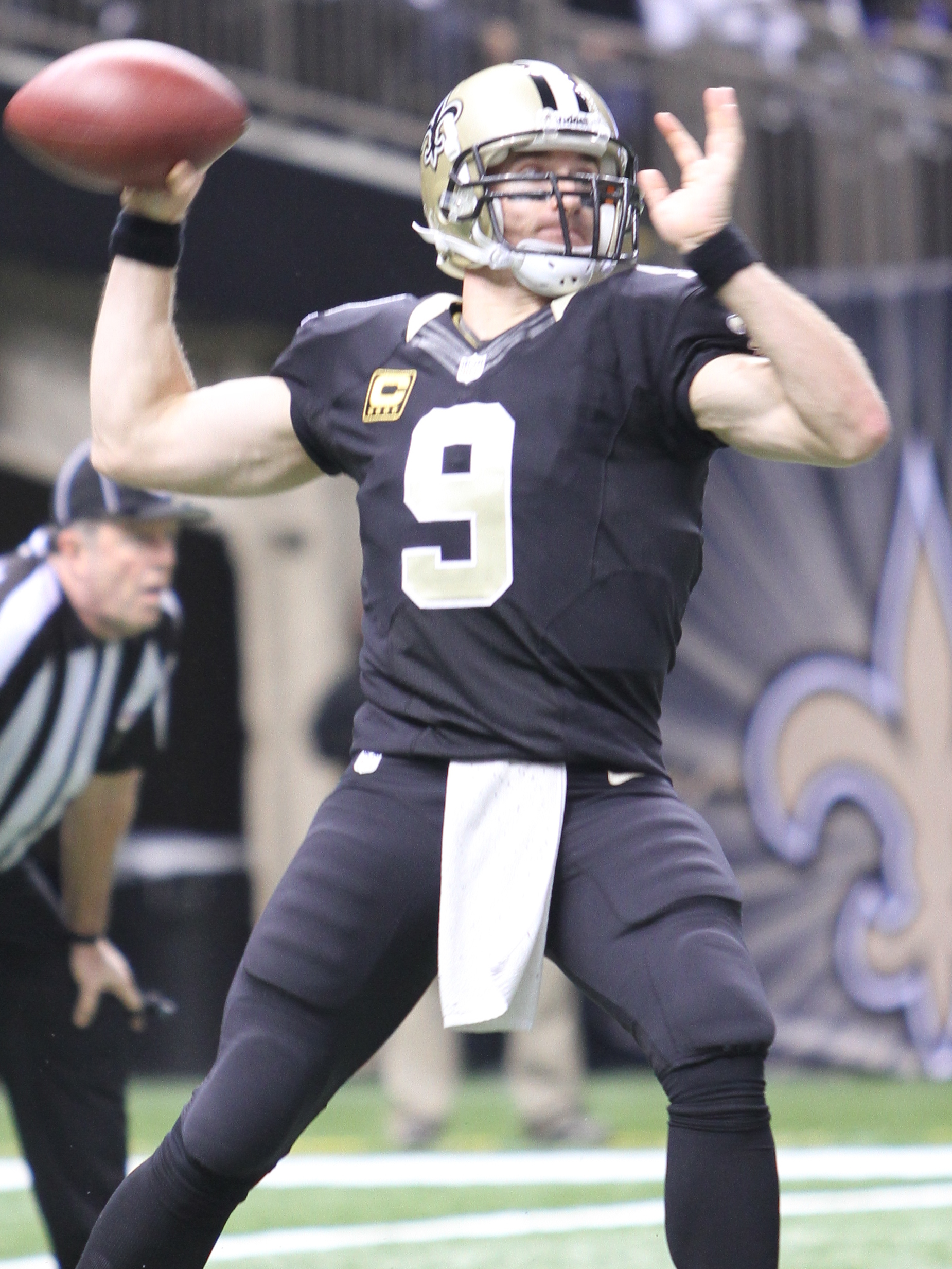
Drew Brees was the team's starting quarterback from 2006 to 2020. During that time he was the Offensive Player of the Year twice, the Walter Payton NFL Man of the Year, and helped lead the team to seven division titles while also breaking NFL records.

Legend
Finish	Final position in league, division, or conference
Pct	The team's winning percentage for the season
^{‡}	Super Bowl champions
^{*}	Conference champions
^{^}	Division champions
^{§}	Wild Card berth

New Orleans Saints record by season
Season	Team	League	Conference	Division	Regular season					Postseason results	Awards	Head coach	Refs
Season	Team	League	Conference	Division	Finish	W	L	T	Pct	Postseason results	Awards	Head coach	Refs
1967	1967	NFL	Eastern	Capitol	4th	3	11	0	.214			Tom Fears	
1968	1968	NFL	Eastern	Century	3rd	4	9	1	.321			Tom Fears	
1969	1969	NFL	Eastern	Capitol	3rd	5	9	0	.357			Tom Fears	
1970	1970	NFL	NFC (Note: In 1970, the NFL and AFL officially merged in the AFL–NFL merger to form one league with two conferences. All ten former AFL teams as well as Pittsburgh, Cleveland, and Baltimore from the pre-merger NFL joined the AFC; the other thirteen remaining NFL teams joined the NFC. Each of those two were divided into three divisions: East, Central, and West.)	West	4th	2	11	1	.179			Tom Fears (1–5–1) J. D. Roberts (1–6)	
1971	1971	NFL	NFC	West	4th	4	8	2	.357			J. D. Roberts	
1972	1972	NFL	NFC	West	4th	2	11	1	.179			J. D. Roberts	
1973	1973	NFL	NFC	West	4th	5	9	0	.357			John North	
1974	1974	NFL	NFC	West	3rd	5	9	0	.357			John North	
1975	1975	NFL	NFC	West	4th	2	12	0	.143			John North (1–5) Ernie Hefferle (1–7)	
1976	1976	NFL	NFC	West	3rd	4	10	0	.286			Hank Stram	
1977	1977	NFL	NFC	West	4th	3	11	0	.214			Hank Stram	
1978	1978	NFL	NFC	West	3rd	7	9	0	.438			Dick Nolan	(Note: In 1978, the NFL expanded its regular season schedule, which had been 14 games since 1961, to 16 games.)
1979	1979	NFL	NFC	West	2nd	8	8	0	.500			Dick Nolan	
1980	1980	NFL	NFC	West	4th	1	15	0	.063			Dick Nolan (0–12) Dick Stanfel (1–3)	
1981	1981	NFL	NFC	West	4th	4	12	0	.250		George Rogers (OROY)	Bum Phillips	
1982	1982	NFL	NFC	None (Note: The 1982 season was shortened to nine games after a players' strike. The top eight teams in each conference advanced to the playoffs.)	9th	4	5	0	.444			Bum Phillips	
1983	1983	NFL	NFC	West	3rd	8	8	0	.500			Bum Phillips	
1984	1984	NFL	NFC	West	3rd	7	9	0	.438			Bum Phillips	
1985	1985	NFL	NFC	West	4th	5	11	0	.313			Bum Phillips (4–8) Wade Phillips (1–3)	
1986	1986	NFL	NFC	West	4th	7	9	0	.438			Jim E. Mora	
1987	1987	NFL	NFC	West	2nd^{§}	12	3	0	.800	Lost Wild Card playoffs (Vikings) 10–44	Jim E. Mora (COY)	Jim E. Mora	(Note: The 1987 NFL strike caused the schedule to be reduced to 15 games.)
1988	1988	NFL	NFC	West	3rd	10	6	0	.625			Jim E. Mora	
1989	1989	NFL	NFC	West	3rd	9	7	0	.563			Jim E. Mora	
1990	1990	NFL	NFC	West	2nd^{§}	8	8	0	.500	Lost Wild Card playoffs (at Bears) 6–16		Jim E. Mora	
1991	1991	NFL	NFC	West^{^}	1st^{^}	11	5	0	.688	Lost Wild Card playoffs (Falcons) 20–27	Pat Swilling (DPOY)	Jim E. Mora	
1992	1992	NFL	NFC	West	2nd^{§}	12	4	0	.750	Lost Wild Card playoffs (Eagles) 20–36		Jim E. Mora	
1993	1993	NFL	NFC	West	2nd	8	8	0	.500			Jim E. Mora	
1994	1994	NFL	NFC	West	2nd	7	9	0	.438			Jim E. Mora	
1995	1995	NFL	NFC	West	5th	7	9	0	.438			Jim E. Mora	
1996	1996	NFL	NFC	West	5th	3	13	0	.188			Jim E. Mora (2–6) Rick Venturi (1–7)	
1997	1997	NFL	NFC	West	3rd	6	10	0	.375			Mike Ditka	
1998	1998	NFL	NFC	West	3rd	6	10	0	.375			Mike Ditka	
1999	1999	NFL	NFC	West	5th	3	13	0	.188			Mike Ditka	
2000	2000	NFL	NFC	West^{^}	1st^{^}	10	6	0	.625	Won Wild Card playoffs (Rams) 31–28; Lost Divisional playoffs (at Vikings) 16–34	Jim Haslett (COY)	Jim Haslett	
2001	2001	NFL	NFC	West	3rd	7	9	0	.438			Jim Haslett	
2002	2002	NFL	NFC	South (Note: In 2002, the NFL realigned to create four divisions in both conferences with four teams in each division.)	3rd	9	7	0	.563			Jim Haslett	
2003	2003	NFL	NFC	South	2nd	8	8	0	.500			Jim Haslett	
2004	2004	NFL	NFC	South	2nd	8	8	0	.500			Jim Haslett	
2005	2005	NFL	NFC	South	4th	3	13	0	.188			Jim Haslett	
2006	2006	NFL	NFC	South^{^}	1st^{^}	10	6	0	.625	Won Divisional playoffs (Eagles) 27–24; Lost NFC Championship (at Bears) 14–39	Sean Payton (COY) Drew Brees (WPMOY)	Sean Payton	
2007	2007	NFL	NFC	South	3rd	7	9	0	.438			Sean Payton	
2008	2008	NFL	NFC	South	4th	8	8	0	.500		Drew Brees (OPOY)	Sean Payton	
2009	2009	NFL^{‡}	NFC^{*}	South^{^}	1st^{^}	13	3	0	.813	Won Divisional playoffs (Cardinals) 45–14; Won NFC Championship (Vikings) 31–28 (OT); Won Super Bowl XLIV (1) (vs. Colts) 31–17	Drew Brees (SB MVP)	Sean Payton	
2010	2010	NFL	NFC	South	2nd^{§}	11	5	0	.688	Lost Wild Card playoffs (at Seahawks) 36–41		Sean Payton	
2011	2011	NFL	NFC	South^{^}	1st^{^}	13	3	0	.813	Won Wild Card playoffs (Lions) 45–28; Lost Divisional playoffs (at 49ers) 32–36	Drew Brees (OPOY)	Sean Payton	
2012	2012	NFL	NFC	South	3rd	7	9	0	.438			Aaron Kromer (2–4) Joe Vitt (5–5)	
2013	2013	NFL	NFC	South	2nd^{§}	11	5	0	.688	Won Wild Card playoffs (at Eagles) 26–24; Lost Divisional playoffs (at Seahawks) 15–23		Sean Payton	
2014	2014	NFL	NFC	South	2nd	7	9	0	.438			Sean Payton	
2015	2015	NFL	NFC	South	3rd	7	9	0	.438			Sean Payton	
2016	2016	NFL	NFC	South	3rd	7	9	0	.438			Sean Payton	
2017	2017	NFL	NFC	South^{^}	1st^{^}	11	5	0	.688	Won Wild Card playoffs (Panthers) 31–26; Lost Divisional playoffs (at Vikings) 24–29	Alvin Kamara (OROY) Marshon Lattimore (DROY)	Sean Payton	
2018	2018	NFL	NFC	South^{^}	1st^{^}	13	3	0	.813	Won Divisional playoffs (Eagles) 20–14; Lost NFC Championship (Rams) 23–26 (OT)		Sean Payton	
2019	2019	NFL	NFC	South^{^}	1st^{^}	13	3	0	.813	Lost Wild Card playoffs (Vikings) 20–26 (OT)	Michael Thomas (OPOY)	Sean Payton	
2020	2020	NFL	NFC	South^{^}	1st^{^}	12	4	0	.750	Won Wild Card playoffs (Bears) 21–9; Lost Divisional playoffs (Buccaneers) 20–30		Sean Payton	
2021	2021	NFL	NFC	South	2nd	9	8	0	.529			Sean Payton	(Note: In 2021, the NFL expanded its regular season schedule, which had been 16 games since 1978, to 17 games.)
2022	2022	NFL	NFC	South	3rd	7	10	0	.412			Dennis Allen	
2023	2023	NFL	NFC	South	2nd	9	8	0	.529			Dennis Allen	
2024	2024	NFL	NFC	South	4th	5	12	0	.294			Dennis Allen (2–7) Darren Rizzi (3–5)	
2025	2025	NFL	NFC	South	4th	6	11	0	.353			Kellen Moore	
Totals						423	491	5	.463	All-time regular season record (1967–2025)			
Totals						10	13	—	.435	All-time postseason record (1967–2025)			
Totals						433	504	5	.462	All-time regular & postseason record (1967–2025)			

== See also ==
- History of the New Orleans Saints
- List of New Orleans Saints first-round draft picks
- List of New Orleans Saints head coaches
