= List of Carolina Panthers seasons =

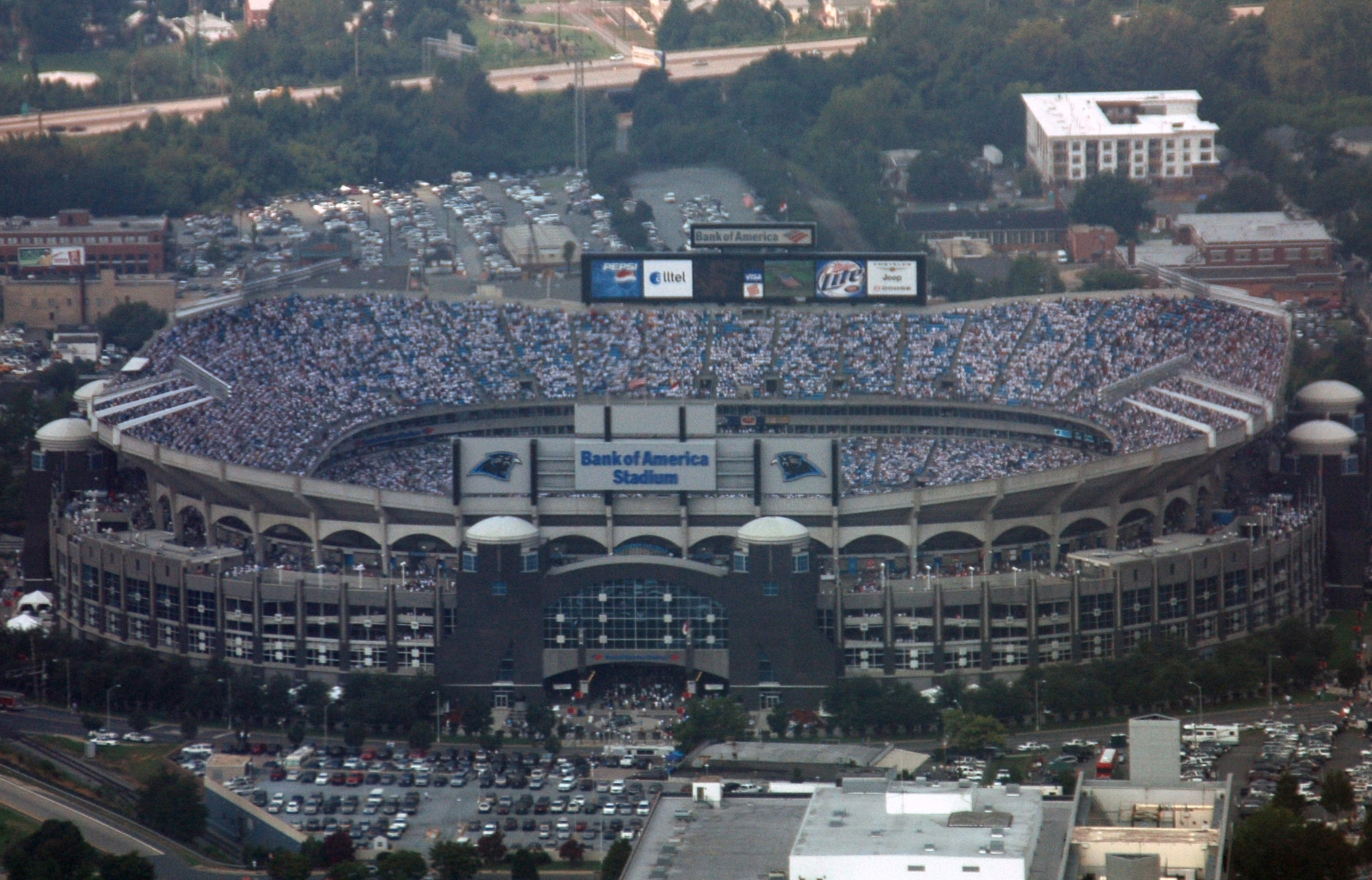
Bank of America Stadium (formerly Ericsson Stadium) has served as the home stadium of the Carolina Panthers in all but the team's inaugural season.

The Carolina Panthers are a professional American football club based in Charlotte, North Carolina. They play in the National Football League (NFL) as a member of the league's National Football Conference (NFC) South division. The Panthers were founded in 1993, when they joined the NFL as an expansion team. The team home field and headquarters is Bank of America Stadium in Uptown Charlotte. The Panthers are supported throughout the Carolinas; although the team has played its home games in Charlotte since 1996, they played their home games at Memorial Stadium in Clemson, South Carolina during its first season in 1995. In the 29 seasons the team has played, it has a record of 223–260–1 (a winning percentage of .474), with two Super Bowl appearances, six division titles, and eight playoff appearances.

The Carolina Panthers inaugural season was in 1995, where team played as members of the NFC West division. Dom Capers was the franchise's first head coach. In their first season, they recorded a record of 7–9, the best record for an expansion team in NFL history. In their second season, they won the NFC West and reached the NFC Championship game, where they lost to the eventual Super Bowl champion Green Bay Packers; Capers won the Associated Press NFL Coach of the Year Award. The Panthers would fail to reach the playoffs in 1997, and in 1998, Capers was fired after a 4–12 finish. George Seifert was hired to replace him as head coach, but failed to reach the playoffs in any of his three seasons. His final season as head coach was in 2001, when the Panthers finished with a league-worst 1–15 record. John Fox was hired as head coach in 2002. In his nine seasons as head coach, the Panthers made the playoffs three times and won two NFC South division titles (in 2003 and 2008). They reached Super Bowl XXXVIII in 2003, the NFC Championship game in 2005, and the Divisional round in 2008.

Fox was not retained as head coach following a 2–14 finish in 2010, and was succeeded by Ron Rivera. Rivera's tenure as head coach was the most successful in team history. The Panthers reached the playoffs four times under Rivera, and won three straight division titles from 2013 to 2015. In 2015, the Panthers recorded their most successful regular season, finishing with a league-best 15–1 record; quarterback Cam Newton received MVP and Offensive Player of the Year honors. However, the team lost Super Bowl 50 24–10 to the Denver Broncos. The team last recorded a playoff appearance in 2017, when they recorded an 11–5 record but lost to the New Orleans Saints in the Wild Card round. After a seven-year playoff drought and three fired head coaches (Rivera in 2019, Matt Rhule in 2022, and Frank Reich in 2023), the Panthers returned to the playoffs in the 2025 season after winning the NFC South with record of 8–9.

== Seasons ==
Key
Conference champions #	Division champions †	Wild Card berth ^

Carolina Panthers records by season
Season	Team	League	Conference	Division	Regular season				Postseason results	Awards	Head coach	Refs.
Season	Team	League	Conference	Division	Finish	W	L	T	Postseason results	Awards	Head coach	Refs.
1995	1995	NFL	NFC	West	4th	7	9	0		Bill Polian (EOY)	Dom Capers	
1996	1996	NFL	NFC	West †	1st †	12	4	0	Won Divisional playoffs (Cowboys) 26–17; Lost NFC Championship (at Packers) 13–30	Dom Capers (COY); Bill Polian (EOY)	Dom Capers	
1997	1997	NFL	NFC	West	2nd	7	9	0			Dom Capers	
1998	1998	NFL	NFC	West	4th	4	12	0			Dom Capers	
1999	1999	NFL	NFC	West	2nd	8	8	0			George Seifert	
2000	2000	NFL	NFC	West	3rd	7	9	0			George Seifert	
2001	2001	NFL	NFC	West	5th	1	15	0			George Seifert	
2002	2002	NFL	NFC	South (Note: Following the 2002 NFL realignment, the Panthers were moved to the NFC South division.)	4th	7	9	0		Julius Peppers (DROY)	John Fox	
2003	2003	NFL	NFC #	South †	1st †	11	5	0	Won Wild Card playoffs (Cowboys) 29–10; Won Divisional playoffs (at Rams) 29–23 (2OT); Won NFC Championship (at Eagles) 14–3; Lost Super Bowl XXXVIII (vs. Patriots) 29–32		John Fox	
2004	2004	NFL	NFC	South	3rd	7	9	0			John Fox	
2005	2005	NFL	NFC	South	2nd ^	11	5	0	Won Wild Card playoffs (at Giants) 23–0; Won Divisional playoffs (at Bears) 29–21; Lost NFC Championship (at Seahawks) 14–34	Steve Smith (CPOY)	John Fox	
2006	2006	NFL	NFC	South	2nd	8	8	0			John Fox	
2007	2007	NFL	NFC	South	2nd	7	9	0			John Fox	
2008	2008	NFL	NFC	South †	1st †	12	4	0	Lost Divisional playoffs (Cardinals) 13–33		John Fox	
2009	2009	NFL	NFC	South	3rd	8	8	0			John Fox	
2010	2010	NFL	NFC	South	4th	2	14	0			John Fox	
2011	2011	NFL	NFC	South	3rd	6	10	0		Cam Newton (OROY)	Ron Rivera	
2012	2012	NFL	NFC	South	2nd	7	9	0		Luke Kuechly (DROY)	Ron Rivera	
2013	2013	NFL	NFC	South †	1st †	12	4	0	Lost Divisional playoffs (49ers) 10–23	Luke Kuechly (DPOY); Ron Rivera (COY)	Ron Rivera	
2014	2014	NFL	NFC	South †	1st †	7	8	1	Won Wild Card playoffs (Cardinals) 27–16; Lost Divisional playoffs (at Seahawks) 17–31	Thomas Davis (WPMOY)	Ron Rivera	
2015	2015	NFL	NFC #	South †	1st †	15	1	0	Won Divisional playoffs (Seahawks) 31–24; Won NFC Championship (Cardinals) 49–15; Lost Super Bowl 50 (vs. Broncos) 10–24	Cam Newton (MVP, OPOY); Ron Rivera (COY); Dave Gettleman (EOY)	Ron Rivera	
2016	2016	NFL	NFC	South	4th	6	10	0			Ron Rivera	
2017	2017	NFL	NFC	South	2nd ^	11	5	0	Lost Wild Card playoffs (at Saints) 26–31		Ron Rivera	
2018	2018	NFL	NFC	South	3rd	7	9	0			Ron Rivera	
2019	2019 (Note: Ron Rivera was fired as head coach midseason, and Perry Fewell was named interim coach for the remainder of the season.)	NFL	NFC	South	4th	5	11	0			Ron Rivera (5–7) (Note: Indicates the coach's record (Wins–Losses).) Perry Fewell (0–4)	
2020	2020	NFL	NFC	South	3rd	5	11	0			Matt Rhule	
2021 (Note: The NFL increased the length of a season from 16 to 17 games.)	2021	NFL	NFC	South	4th	5	12	0			Matt Rhule	
2022	2022 (Note: Matt Rhule was fired as head coach midseason, and Steve Wilks was named interim coach for the remainder of the season.)	NFL	NFC	South	2nd	7	10	0			Matt Rhule (1–4) Steve Wilks (6–6)	
2023	2023 (Note: Frank Reich was fired as head coach midseason, and Chris Tabor was named interim head coach for the remainder of the season.)	NFL	NFC	South	4th	2	15	0			Frank Reich (1–10) Chris Tabor (1–5)	
2024	2024	NFL	NFC	South	3rd	5	12	0			Dave Canales	
2025	2025	NFL	NFC	South †	1st †	8	9	0	Lost Wild Card playoffs (Rams) 31–34	Tetairoa McMillan (OROY)	Dave Canales	
Totals						227	273	1	All-time regular season record (1995–2025)			
Totals						9	9	—	All-time postseason record (1995–2025)			
Totals						236	282	1	All-time regular & postseason record (1995–2025)			
