= List of Tampa Bay Buccaneers seasons =

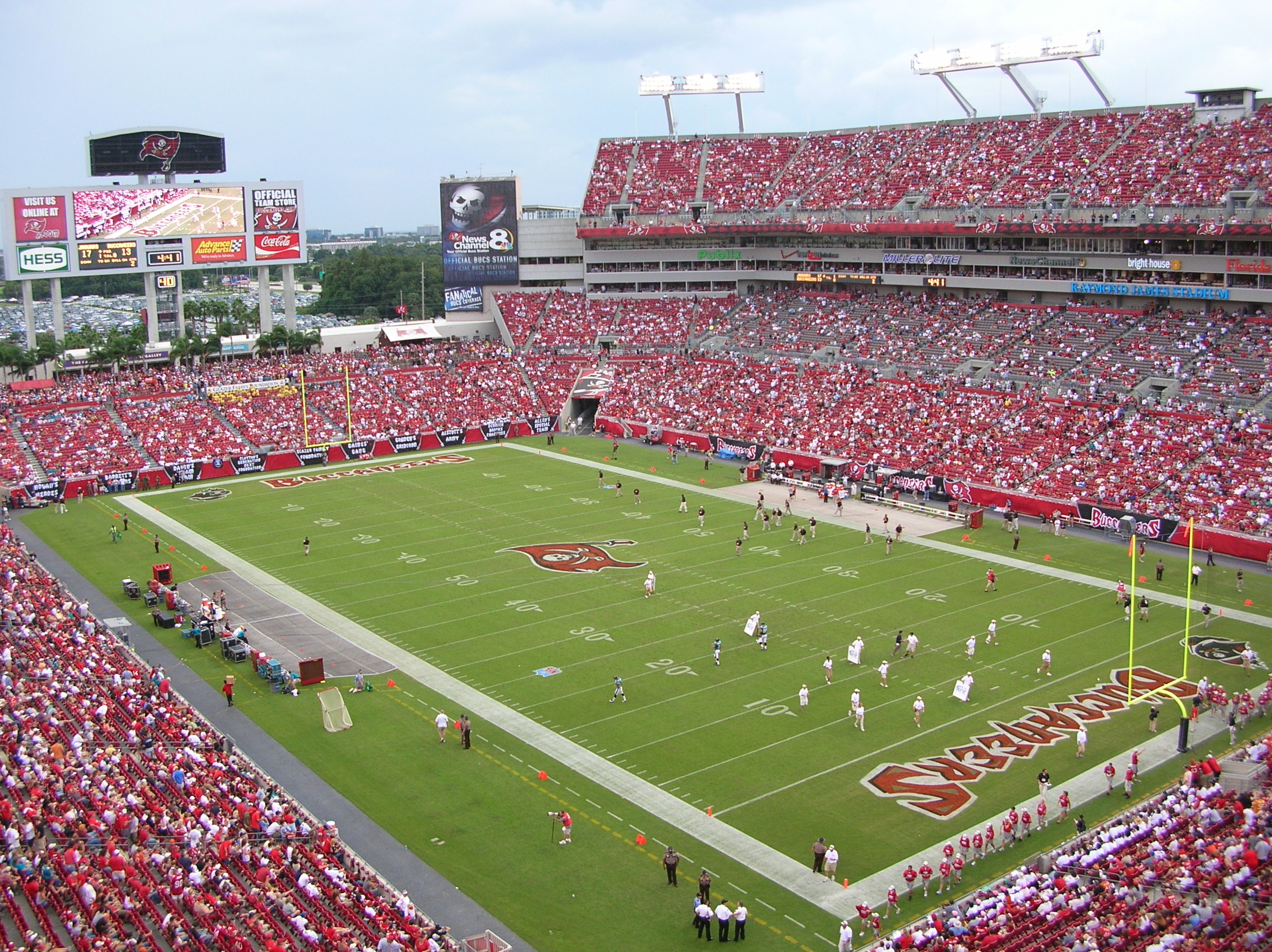
Raymond James Stadium where the Buccaneers have played their home games since 1998

The Tampa Bay Buccaneers are a professional American football team based in Tampa, Florida. The Buccaneers compete in the National Football League (NFL) as a member of the National Football Conference (NFC) South Division. The Buccaneers have played their home games at Raymond James Stadium since 1998. Founded in 1974 by Hugh Culverhouse, the Buccaneers joined the NFL in 1976 as members of the AFC West. The following year, they moved to the NFC Central, where they stayed until division realignment in 2002, at which point they were moved to the NFC South. The Tampa Bay expansion franchise was originally awarded to Tom McCloskey, a construction company owner from Philadelphia, but was later awarded to Culverhouse after McCloskey backed out. They were purchased by Malcolm Glazer in 1995 for $192 million, following Culverhouse's death. Glazer owned the team until his death in 2014, at which point the team passed on to his six children. The team has been owned and run by the Glazer family since then.

The franchise has made it to the Super Bowl twice, first in Super Bowl XXXVII during the 2002 season and again in Super Bowl LV during the 2020 season. The Buccaneers are one of two NFL franchises to have at least two Super Bowl appearances without a loss, along with the Baltimore Ravens. Until the 2008 Detroit Lions went winless, the Buccaneers were the only team in the Super Bowl-era to go winless in a season that was not shortened by a strike, (Note: The Baltimore Colts went 0–8–1 during the 1982 season, which was shortened due to a player strike.) doing so in their inaugural 1976 season.

As of the end of the 2025 season, the Buccaneers have an all-time record of 326 wins, 466 losses, and a single tie in the regular season, with an additional 12 wins and 13 losses in the playoffs. The team has made the playoffs 15 times and won their division ten times, three of which were as a part of the NFC Central and seven as part of the NFC South.

== Seasons ==
Legend
^{(#)}	The order of league championship won by the franchise
Finish	Final position in league, division, or conference
Pct	The team's winning percentage for the season
^{‡}	Super Bowl champions
^{*}	Conference champions
^{^}	Division champions
^{§}	Wild Card berth

Tampa Bay Buccaneers record by season
Season	Team	League	Conference	Division	Regular season					Postseason results	Awards	Head coach	Refs
Season	Team	League	Conference	Division	Finish	W	L	T	Pct	Postseason results	Awards	Head coach	Refs
1976	1976	NFL	AFC	West	5th	0	14	0	.000			John McKay	
1977	1977	NFL	NFC (Note: The Buccaneers were moved from the AFC West to the NFC Central division prior to the start of the 1977 season, switching with fellow 1976 expansion team, the Seattle Seahawks. The Buccaneers and Seahawks played unique schedules in the 1976 and 1977 seasons, playing every team in their conference as well as one game against each other. The goal of this schedule, and the division swap, was to have the expansion franchises play every other team in the 28-team league by the end of the second season. Following the 1977 season, the Buccaneers and Seahawks played a normal schedule.)	Central	5th	2	12	0	.143			John McKay	
1978	1978	NFL	NFC	Central	5th	5	11	0	.313			John McKay	(Note: In 1978, the NFL expanded its regular season schedule, which had been 14 games since 1961, to 16 games.)
1979	1979	NFL	NFC	Central^{^}	1st^{^}	10	6	0	.625	Won Divisional playoffs (Eagles) 24–17; Lost NFC Championship (Rams) 9–0	Lee Roy Selmon (DPOY)	John McKay	
1980	1980	NFL	NFC	Central	4th	5	10	1	.344			John McKay	
1981	1981	NFL	NFC	Central^{^}	1st^{^}	9	7	0	.563	Lost Divisional playoffs (at Cowboys) 38–0		John McKay	
1982	1982	NFL	NFC	— (Note: The 1982 season was shortened to nine games after a players' strike. The top eight teams in each conference advanced to the playoffs.)	7th^{§}	5	4	0	.556	Lost First round playoffs (at Cowboys) 30–17		John McKay	
1983	1983	NFL	NFC	Central	5th	2	14	0	.125			John McKay	
1984	1984	NFL	NFC	Central	3rd	6	10	0	.375			John McKay	
1985	1985	NFL	NFC	Central	5th	2	14	0	.125			Leeman Bennett	
1986	1986	NFL	NFC	Central	5th	2	14	0	.125			Leeman Bennett	
1987	1987	NFL	NFC	Central	4th	4	11	0	.267			Ray Perkins	(Note: The 1987 NFL strike caused the schedule to be reduced to 15 games.)
1988	1988	NFL	NFC	Central	3rd	5	11	0	.313			Ray Perkins	
1989	1989	NFL	NFC	Central	5th	5	11	0	.313			Ray Perkins	
1990	1990	NFL	NFC	Central	2nd	6	10	0	.375			Ray Perkins (5–8) Richard Williamson (1–2)	
1991	1991	NFL	NFC	Central	5th	3	13	0	.188			Richard Williamson	
1992	1992	NFL	NFC	Central	3rd	5	11	0	.313			Sam Wyche	
1993	1993	NFL	NFC	Central	5th	5	11	0	.313			Sam Wyche	
1994	1994	NFL	NFC	Central	5th	6	10	0	.375			Sam Wyche	
1995	1995	NFL	NFC	Central	5th	7	9	0	.438			Sam Wyche	
1996	1996	NFL	NFC	Central	4th	6	10	0	.375			Tony Dungy	
1997	1997	NFL	NFC	Central	2nd^{§}	10	6	0	.625	Won Wild Card playoffs (Lions) 20–10; Lost Divisional playoffs (at Packers) 21–7	Warrick Dunn (OROY)	Tony Dungy	
1998	1998	NFL	NFC	Central	3rd	8	8	0	.500			Tony Dungy	
1999	1999	NFL	NFC	Central^{^}	1st^{^}	11	5	0	.688	Won Divisional playoffs (Redskins) 14–13; Lost NFC Championship (at Rams) 11–6	Warren Sapp (DPOY)	Tony Dungy	
2000	2000	NFL	NFC	Central	2nd^{§}	10	6	0	.625	Lost Wild Card playoffs (at Eagles) 3–21	Derrick Brooks (WPMOY)	Tony Dungy	
2001	2001	NFL	NFC	Central	3rd^{§}	9	7	0	.563	Lost Wild Card playoffs (at Eagles) 9–31		Tony Dungy	
2002	2002	NFL^{†}	NFC^{*}	South^{^} (Note: In 2002, the NFL realigned to create four divisions in both conferences with four teams in each division.)	1st^{^}	12	4	0	.750	Won Divisional playoffs (49ers) 31–6; Won NFC Championship (at Eagles) 27–10; Won Super Bowl XXXVII (1) (vs. Raiders) 48–21	Derrick Brooks (DPOY) Dexter Jackson (SB MVP)	Jon Gruden	
2003	2003	NFL	NFC	South	3rd	7	9	0	.438			Jon Gruden	
2004	2004	NFL	NFC	South	4th	5	11	0	.313			Jon Gruden	
2005	2005	NFL	NFC	South^{^}	1st^{^}	11	5	0	.688	Lost Wild Card playoffs (Redskins) 17–10	Cadillac Williams (OROY)	Jon Gruden	
2006	2006	NFL	NFC	South	4th	4	12	0	.250			Jon Gruden	
2007	2007	NFL	NFC	South^{^}	1st^{^}	9	7	0	.563	Lost Wild Card playoffs (Giants) 24–14		Jon Gruden	
2008	2008	NFL	NFC	South	3rd	9	7	0	.563			Jon Gruden	
2009	2009	NFL	NFC	South	4th	3	13	0	.188			Raheem Morris	
2010	2010	NFL	NFC	South	3rd	10	6	0	.625			Raheem Morris	
2011	2011	NFL	NFC	South	4th	4	12	0	.250			Raheem Morris	
2012	2012	NFL	NFC	South	4th	7	9	0	.438			Greg Schiano	
2013	2013	NFL	NFC	South	4th	4	12	0	.250			Greg Schiano	
2014	2014	NFL	NFC	South	4th	2	14	0	.125			Lovie Smith	
2015	2015	NFL	NFC	South	4th	6	10	0	.375			Lovie Smith	
2016	2016	NFL	NFC	South	2nd	9	7	0	.563			Dirk Koetter	
2017	2017	NFL	NFC	South	4th	5	11	0	.313			Dirk Koetter	
2018	2018	NFL	NFC	South	4th	5	11	0	.313			Dirk Koetter	
2019	2019	NFL	NFC	South	3rd	7	9	0	.438			Bruce Arians	
2020	2020	NFL^{†}	NFC^{*}	South	2nd^{§}	11	5	0	.688	Won Wild Card playoffs (at Football Team) 31–23; Won Divisional playoffs (at Saints) 30–20; Won NFC Championship (at Packers) 31–26; Won Super Bowl LV (2) (vs. Chiefs) 31–9	Tom Brady (SB MVP)	Bruce Arians	
2021	2021	NFL	NFC	South^{^}	1st^{^}	13	4	0	.765	Won Wild Card playoffs (Eagles) 31–15; Lost Divisional playoffs (Rams) 30–27		Bruce Arians	(Note: In 2021, the NFL expanded its regular season schedule, which had been 16 games since 1978, to 17 games.)
2022	2022	NFL	NFC	South^{^}	1st^{^}	8	9	0	.471	Lost Wild Card playoffs (Cowboys) 31–14		Todd Bowles	
2023	2023	NFL	NFC	South^{^}	1st^{^}	9	8	0	.529	Won Wild Card playoffs (Eagles) 32–9; Lost Divisional playoffs (at Lions) 31–23		Todd Bowles	
2024	2024	NFL	NFC	South^{^}	1st^{^}	10	7	0	.588	Lost Wild Card playoffs (Commanders) 23–20		Todd Bowles	
2025	2025	NFL	NFC	South	2nd	8	9	0	.471			Todd Bowles	
Totals						326	466	1	.412	All-time regular season record (1976–2025)			
Totals						12	13	—	.480	All-time postseason record (1976–2025)			
Totals						338	479	1	.414	All-time regular season & postseason record (1976–2025)			

== See also ==
- History of the Tampa Bay Buccaneers
