= List of Jacksonville Jaguars seasons =

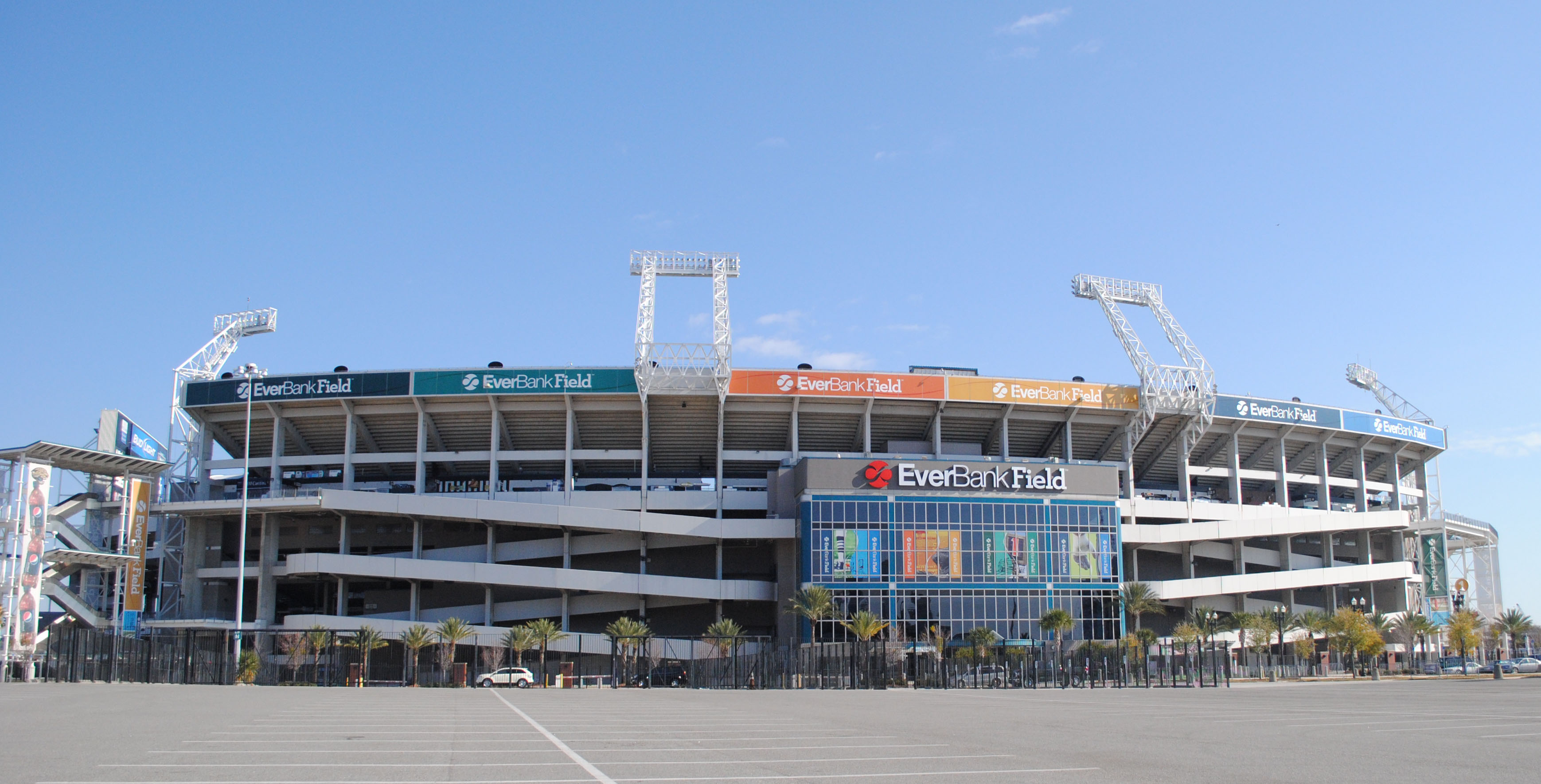
Since their inaugural season in 1995, the Jaguars have played their home games at EverBank Stadium.

The Jacksonville Jaguars are a professional American football team based in Jacksonville, Florida. The Jaguars compete in the National Football League (NFL) as a member of the American Football Conference (AFC) South Division. The team plays its home games at EverBank Stadium in downtown Jacksonville. The Jaguars joined the NFL in 1995 as an expansion team, along with the Carolina Panthers.

They have made the playoffs nine times, although they are one of four current NFL teams to have never played in a Super Bowl, along with the Cleveland Browns, Detroit Lions, and Houston Texans. The team has played in the AFC Championship Game on three occasions (1996, 1999, and 2017) but lost each time. Additionally, the team has won a division title five times; two as part of the AFC Central Division (1998 and 1999) and three as part of the AFC South (2017, 2022, and 2025).

As of the end of the 2025 season, the Jaguars have an all-time record of 215 wins, 286 losses, and 0 ties in the regular season, with an additional 8 wins and 8 losses in the playoffs. The team has had ten winning seasons, two 8–8 seasons, and eighteen losing seasons. The Jaguars are the only active franchise to have never had a tie game.

== Seasons ==
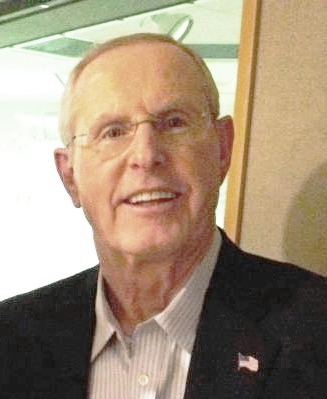
Tom Coughlin was the inaugural head coach of the team. With 72 wins, 68 of which were in the regular season, Coughlin holds the franchise record for most wins by a head coach.

Legend
Finish	Final position in league, division, or conference
Pct	The team's winning percentage for the season
^{‡}	Super Bowl champions
^{*}	Conference champions
^{^}	Division champions
^{§}	Wild Card berth

Jacksonville Jaguars record by season
Season	Team	League	Conference	Division	Regular season					Postseason results	Awards	Head coach	Refs
Season	Team	League	Conference	Division	Finish	W	L	T	Pct	Postseason results	Awards	Head coach	Refs
1995	1995	NFL	AFC	Central	5th	4	12	0	.250			Tom Coughlin	
1996	1996	NFL	AFC	Central	2nd^{§}	9	7	0	.563	Won Wild Card Playoffs (at Bills) 30–27; Won Divisional Playoffs (at Broncos) 30–27; Lost AFC Championship (at Patriots) 6–20		Tom Coughlin	
1997	1997	NFL	AFC	Central	2nd^{§}	11	5	0	.688	Lost Wild Card Playoffs (at Broncos) 17–42		Tom Coughlin	
1998	1998	NFL	AFC	Central^{^}	1st^{^}	11	5	0	.688	Won Wild Card Playoffs (Patriots) 25–10; Lost Divisional Playoffs (at Jets) 24–34		Tom Coughlin	
1999	1999	NFL	AFC	Central^{^}	1st^{^}	14	2	0	.875	Won Divisional Playoffs (Dolphins) 62–7; Lost AFC Championship (Titans) 14–33		Tom Coughlin	
2000	2000	NFL	AFC	Central	4th	7	9	0	.438			Tom Coughlin	
2001	2001	NFL	AFC	Central	5th	6	10	0	.375			Tom Coughlin	
2002	2002	NFL	AFC	South (Note: In 2002, the NFL realigned to create four divisions in both conferences with four teams in each division.)	3rd	6	10	0	.375			Tom Coughlin	
2003	2003	NFL	AFC	South	3rd	5	11	0	.313			Jack Del Rio	
2004	2004	NFL	AFC	South	2nd	9	7	0	.563			Jack Del Rio	
2005	2005	NFL	AFC	South	2nd^{§}	12	4	0	.750	Lost Wild Card Playoffs (at Patriots) 3–28		Jack Del Rio	
2006	2006	NFL	AFC	South	3rd	8	8	0	.500			Jack Del Rio	
2007	2007	NFL	AFC	South	2nd^{§}	11	5	0	.688	Won Wild Card Playoffs (at Steelers) 31–29; Lost Divisional Playoffs (at Patriots) 20–31		Jack Del Rio	
2008	2008	NFL	AFC	South	4th	5	11	0	.313			Jack Del Rio	
2009	2009	NFL	AFC	South	4th	7	9	0	.438			Jack Del Rio	
2010	2010	NFL	AFC	South	2nd	8	8	0	.500			Jack Del Rio	
2011	2011	NFL	AFC	South	3rd	5	11	0	.313			Jack Del Rio (3–8) Mel Tucker (2–3)	
2012	2012	NFL	AFC	South	4th	2	14	0	.125			Mike Mularkey	
2013	2013	NFL	AFC	South	3rd	4	12	0	.250			Gus Bradley	
2014	2014	NFL	AFC	South	3rd	3	13	0	.188			Gus Bradley	
2015	2015	NFL	AFC	South	3rd	5	11	0	.313			Gus Bradley	
2016	2016	NFL	AFC	South	4th	3	13	0	.188			Gus Bradley (2–12) Doug Marrone (1–1)	
2017	2017	NFL	AFC	South^{^}	1st^{^}	10	6	0	.625	Won Wild Card Playoffs (Bills) 10–3; Won Divisional Playoffs (at Steelers) 45–42; Lost AFC Championship (at Patriots) 20–24		Doug Marrone	
2018	2018	NFL	AFC	South	4th	5	11	0	.313			Doug Marrone	
2019	2019	NFL	AFC	South	4th	6	10	0	.375		Calais Campbell (WPMOY)	Doug Marrone	
2020	2020	NFL	AFC	South	4th	1	15	0	.063			Doug Marrone	
2021	2021	NFL	AFC	South	4th	3	14	0	.176			Urban Meyer (2–11) Darrell Bevell (1–3)	(Note: In 2021, the NFL expanded its regular season schedule, which had been 16 games since 1978, to 17 games.)
2022	2022	NFL	AFC	South^{^}	1st^{^}	9	8	0	.529	Won Wild Card Playoffs (Chargers) 31–30; Lost Divisional Playoffs (at Chiefs) 20–27		Doug Pederson	
2023	2023	NFL	AFC	South	2nd	9	8	0	.529			Doug Pederson	
2024	2024	NFL	AFC	South	3rd	4	13	0	.235		Arik Armstead (WPMOY)	Doug Pederson	
2025	2025	NFL	AFC	South^{^}	1st^{^}	13	4	0	.765	Lost Wild Card Playoffs (Bills) 24–27		Liam Coen	
Totals						215	286	0	.429	All-time regular season record (1995–2025)			
Totals						8	9	—	.471	All-time postseason record (1995–2025)			
Totals						223	295	0	.431	All-time regular & postseason record (1995–2025)			

== See also ==
- History of the Jacksonville Jaguars
- List of Jacksonville Jaguars first-round draft picks
- List of Jacksonville Jaguars head coaches
