= List of Baltimore Ravens seasons =

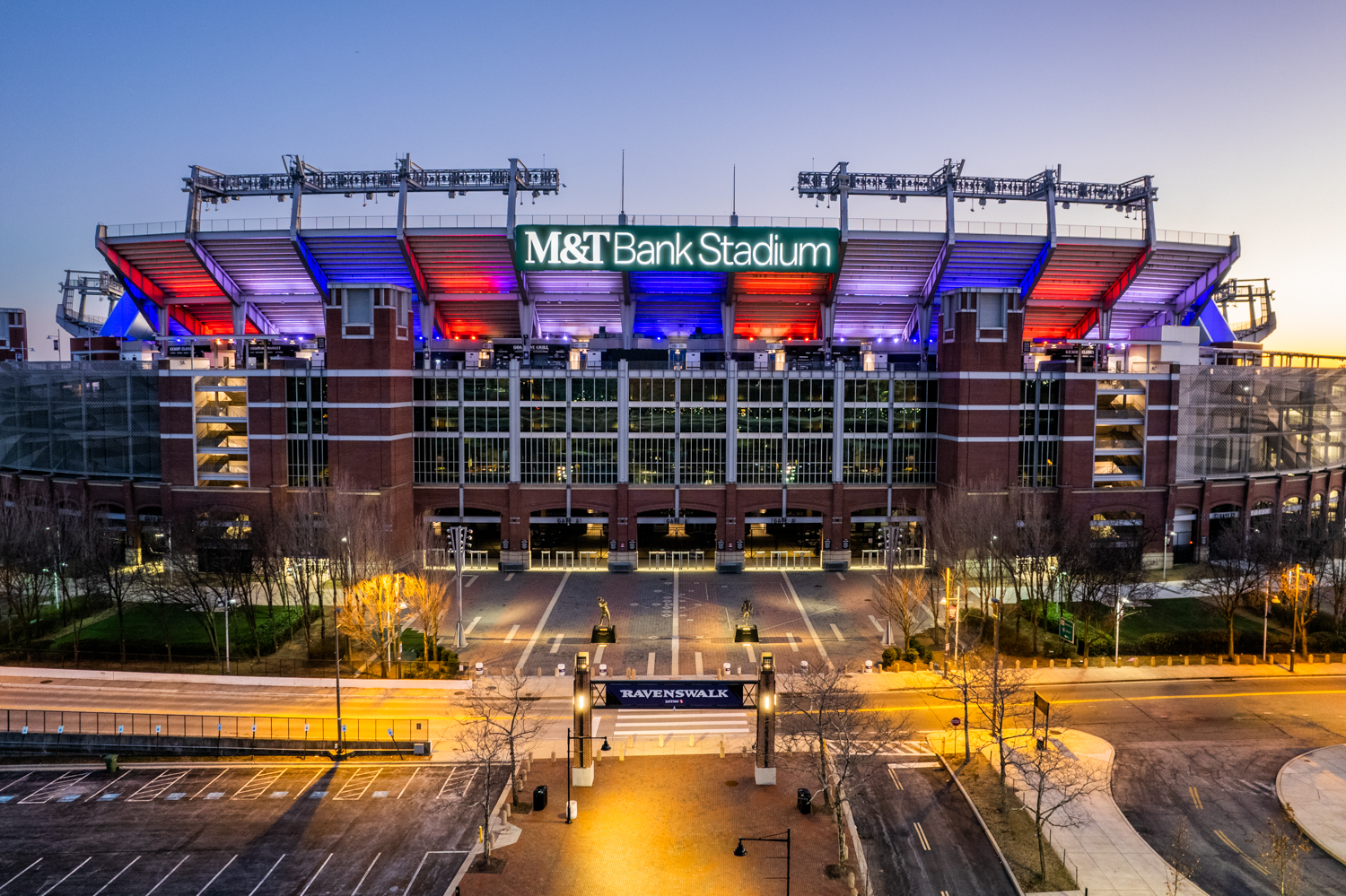
The Baltimore Ravens have played their home games at M&T Bank Stadium since 1998.

The Baltimore Ravens are a professional American football franchise based in Baltimore, Maryland. The Ravens are members of the North division in the American Football Conference (AFC) of the National Football League (NFL); from 1996 to 2001, they played in the AFC Central division. The team began play in 1996 as a result of former Cleveland Browns owner Art Modell's decision to move the Browns to Baltimore, however, the Ravens were treated as an expansion franchise as the Browns' records and history were left in Cleveland. The Ravens were owned by Modell until 2004 when he sold the team to Baltimore businessman Steve Bisciotti.

Over their 29 seasons in the NFL, the Ravens have become a successful team. Through the 2024 season, their record of 268 wins, 199 losses, and 1 tie is tied for the best all-time regular season record among active franchises. (Note: In terms of win-loss percentage) They also have the fourth best playoff record with 18 wins and 14 losses. The Ravens have won two Super Bowl championships: in 2000, when the team defeated the New York Giants 34–7 in Super Bowl XXXV; and in 2012, when the team defeated the San Francisco 49ers 34–31 in Super Bowl XLVII. They are one of two NFL franchises to be undefeated in multiple Super Bowls, along with the Tampa Bay Buccaneers. In addition to their two Super Bowl wins, the Ravens have won two AFC Championship titles (2000 and 2012) and eight AFC North division titles (2003, 2006, 2011, 2012, 2018, 2019, 2023 and 2024). The team currently has eighteen winning seasons, three 8–8 seasons, and eight losing seasons.

== Seasons ==
Key
Super Bowl champions*	Conference champions#	Division champions†	Wild Card berth^

Baltimore Ravens seasonal records
Season	Team	League	Conference	Division	Regular season				Postseason results	Awards	Head coach	Ref.
Season	Team	League	Conference	Division	Finish	W	L	T	Postseason results	Awards	Head coach	Ref.
1996	1996	NFL	AFC	Central	5th	4	12	0			Ted Marchibroda	
1997	1997	NFL	AFC	Central	5th	6	9	1		Peter Boulware (DROY)	Ted Marchibroda	
1998	1998	NFL	AFC	Central	4th	6	10	0			Ted Marchibroda	
1999	1999	NFL	AFC	Central	3rd	8	8	0			Brian Billick	
2000	2000	NFL*	AFC#	Central	2nd^	12	4	0	Won Wild Card Playoffs (Broncos) 21–3; Won Divisional Playoffs (at Titans) 24–10; Won AFC Championship (at Raiders) 16–3; Won Super Bowl XXXV (1) (vs. Giants) 34–7	Ray Lewis (SBMVP, DPOY)	Brian Billick	
2001	2001	NFL	AFC	Central	2nd^	10	6	0	Won Wild Card Playoffs (at Dolphins) 20–3; Lost Divisional Playoffs (at Steelers) 10–27		Brian Billick	
2002	2002	NFL	AFC	North	3rd	7	9	0			Brian Billick	
2003	2003	NFL	AFC	North†	1st†	10	6	0	Lost Wild Card Playoffs (Titans) 17–20	Jamal Lewis (OPOY); Ray Lewis (DPOY); Terrell Suggs (DROY)	Brian Billick	
2004	2004	NFL	AFC	North	2nd	9	7	0		Ed Reed (DPOY)	Brian Billick	
2005	2005	NFL	AFC	North	3rd	6	10	0			Brian Billick	
2006	2006	NFL	AFC	North†	1st†	13	3	0	Lost Divisional Playoffs (Colts) 6–15		Brian Billick	
2007	2007	NFL	AFC	North	4th	5	11	0			Brian Billick	
2008	2008	NFL	AFC	North	2nd^	11	5	0	Won Wild Card Playoffs (at Dolphins) 27–9; Won Divisional Playoffs (at Titans) 13–10; Lost AFC Championship (at Steelers) 14–23		John Harbaugh	
2009	2009	NFL	AFC	North	2nd^	9	7	0	Won Wild Card Playoffs (at Patriots) 33–14; Lost Divisional Playoffs (at Colts) 3–20		John Harbaugh	
2010	2010	NFL	AFC	North	2nd^	12	4	0	Won Wild Card Playoffs (at Chiefs) 30–7; Lost Divisional Playoffs (at Steelers) 24–31		John Harbaugh	
2011	2011	NFL	AFC	North†	1st†	12	4	0	Won Divisional Playoffs (Texans) 20–13; Lost AFC Championship (at Patriots) 20–23	Terrell Suggs (DPOY); Matt Birk (WPMOY)	John Harbaugh	
2012	2012	NFL*	AFC#	North†	1st†	10	6	0	Won Wild Card Playoffs (Colts) 24–9; Won Divisional Playoffs (at Broncos) 38–35 (2OT); Won AFC Championship (at Patriots) 28–13; Won Super Bowl XLVII (2) (vs. 49ers) 34–31	Joe Flacco (SBMVP)	John Harbaugh	
2013	2013	NFL	AFC	North	3rd	8	8	0			John Harbaugh	
2014	2014	NFL	AFC	North	3rd^	10	6	0	Won Wild Card Playoffs (at Steelers) 30–17; Lost Divisional Playoffs (at Patriots) 31–35		John Harbaugh	
2015	2015	NFL	AFC	North	3rd	5	11	0			John Harbaugh	
2016	2016	NFL	AFC	North	2nd	8	8	0			John Harbaugh	
2017	2017	NFL	AFC	North	2nd	9	7	0			John Harbaugh	
2018	2018	NFL	AFC	North†	1st†	10	6	0	Lost Wild Card Playoffs (Chargers) 17–23		John Harbaugh	
2019	2019	NFL	AFC	North†	1st†	14	2	0	Lost Divisional Playoffs (Titans) 12–28	Lamar Jackson (MVP); John Harbaugh (COY)	John Harbaugh	
2020	2020	NFL	AFC	North	2nd^	11	5	0	Won Wild Card Playoffs (at Titans) 20–13; Lost Divisional Playoffs (at Bills) 3–17		John Harbaugh	
2021	2021	NFL	AFC	North	4th	8	9	0			John Harbaugh	
2022	2022	NFL	AFC	North	2nd^	10	7	0	Lost Wild Card Playoffs (at Bengals) 17–24		John Harbaugh	
2023	2023	NFL	AFC	North†	1st†	13	4	0	Won Divisional Playoffs (Texans) 34–10; Lost AFC Championship (Chiefs) 10–17	Lamar Jackson (MVP)	John Harbaugh	
2024	2024	NFL	AFC	North†	1st†	12	5	0	Won Wild Card Playoffs (Steelers) 28–14; Lost Divisional Playoffs (at Bills) 25–27		John Harbaugh	
2025	2025	NFL	AFC	North	2nd	8	9	0			John Harbaugh	
Total						276	208	1	All-time regular season record (1996–2025)			
Total						18	14	—	All-time postseason record (1996–2025)			
Total						294	222	1	All-time regular & postseason record (1996–2025)			

== See also ==
- History of the Baltimore Ravens

== Notes ==
Notes

Footnotes
