= List of Atlanta Falcons seasons =

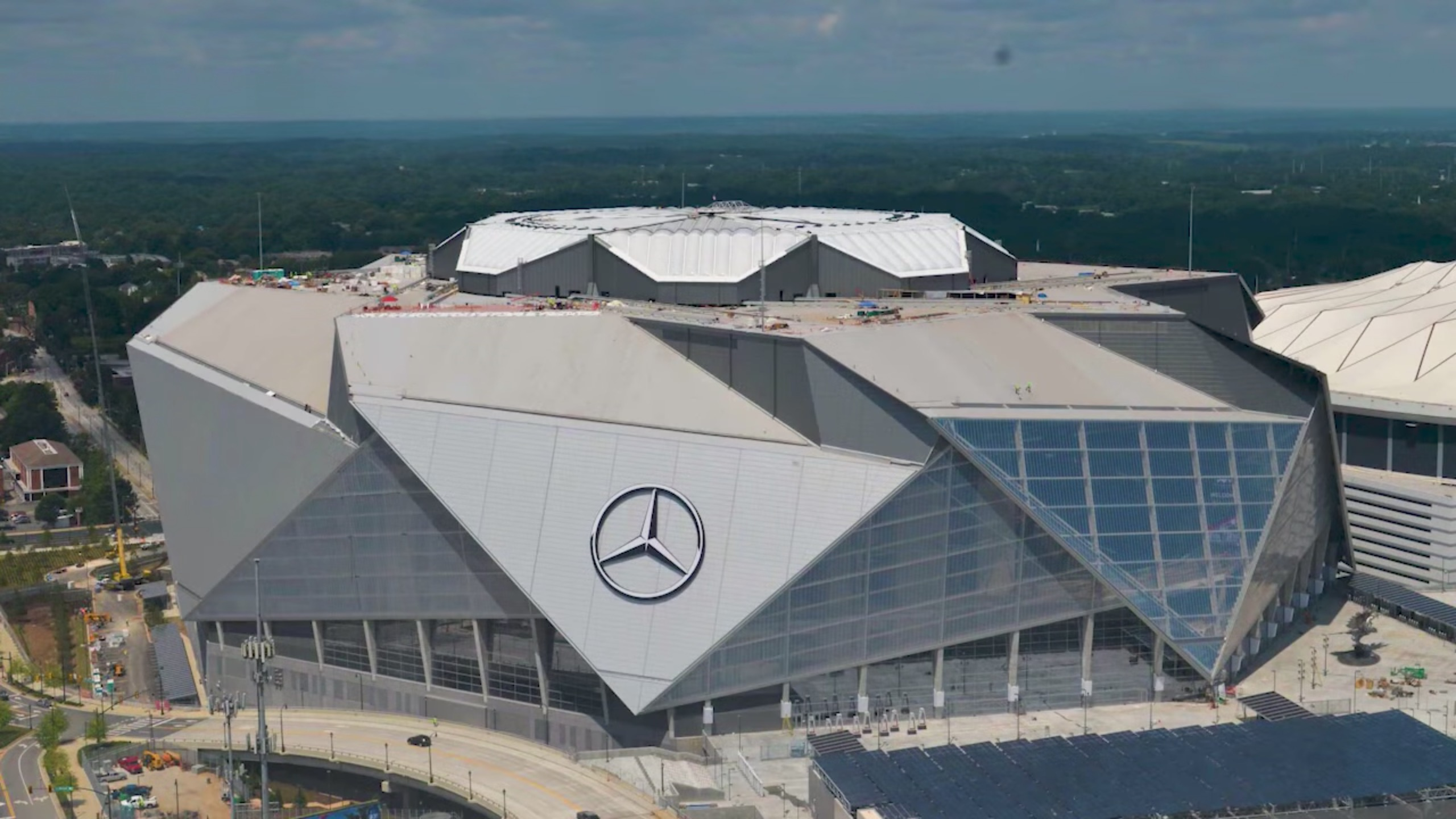
The Atlanta Falcons have played their home games at the Mercedes-Benz Stadium since 2017.

The Atlanta Falcons are a professional American football team based in Atlanta, Georgia. They are a member of the South Division of the National Football Conference (NFC) in the National Football League (NFL). The Falcons were founded on June 30, 1965, with the NFL awarding Atlanta a football team to prevent the franchise from joining the rival American Football League. NFL commissioner Pete Rozelle granted ownership of the team to businessman Rankin Smith, beginning play in the 1966 season as an expansion team. The name "Falcons" was suggested by high school teacher Julia Elliott through a 1965 contest. Smith remained as the owner of the Falcons until his death in 1997, with ownership of the team then transferring to his son Taylor. Taylor Smith reached a preliminary agreement with businessman Arthur Blank to purchase the team on December 6, 2001. The sale was finalized on February 2, 2002, following a unanimous vote by NFL owners. Since the team's inception, it has been based in Atlanta, playing their home games at the Mercedes-Benz Stadium since 2017. They previously played home games at the Atlanta–Fulton County Stadium (1966–1991) and the Georgia Dome (1992–2016). The Falcons began play in the Eastern Conference of the NFL, before moving to the Coastal division in the Western Conference. Following the 1970 NFL realignment, the team moved to the NFC West division. The team moved for the third and final time to the NFC South division following the 2002 NFL realignment.

Over their 59 seasons in the NFL, the Falcons have accumulated a record of 390 wins, 512 losses, and 6 ties. A mark of the franchise's inconsistency is that they did not have consecutive seasons with better than .500 records until 2008 and 2009. They have also made the playoffs fourteen times and have the seventh-worst playoff record in terms of win-loss percentage with 10 wins and 14 losses. The Falcons appeared in two Super Bowl championships—Super Bowl XXXIII and Super Bowl LI—losing to the Denver Broncos and the New England Patriots, respectively. The Falcons have won the NFC Championship twice and a division title six times, winning the NFC West twice (1978 and 1998) and the NFC South four times (2004, 2010, 2012 and 2016). The team currently has seventeen winning seasons, four tied seasons, and thirty-eight losing seasons.

== Seasons ==
Key
Super Bowl champions *	Conference champions #	Division champions †	Wild Card berth ^

Atlanta Falcons seasonal records
Season	Team	League	Conference	Division	Regular season				Postseason results	Awards	Head coach	Refs.
Season	Team	League	Conference	Division	Finish	W	L	T	Postseason results	Awards	Head coach	Refs.
1966	1966	NFL	Eastern	—	7th	3	11	0		Tommy Nobis (DROY)	Norb Hecker	
1967	1967	NFL	Western	Coastal	4th	1	12	1			Norb Hecker	
1968	1968	NFL	Western	Coastal	4th	2	12	0		Claude Humphrey (DROY)	Norb Hecker (0–3) Norm Van Brocklin (2–9)	
1969	1969	NFL	Western	Coastal	3rd	6	8	0			Norm Van Brocklin	
1970	1970	NFL	NFC	West (Note: The NFL underwent a realignment of teams in the 1970 season, with the Falcons moving to the NFC West division.)	3rd	4	8	2			Norm Van Brocklin	
1971	1971	NFL	NFC	West	3rd	7	6	1			Norm Van Brocklin	
1972	1972	NFL	NFC	West	2nd	7	7	0			Norm Van Brocklin	
1973	1973	NFL	NFC	West	2nd	9	5	0			Norm Van Brocklin	
1974	1974	NFL	NFC	West	4th	3	11	0			Norm Van Brocklin (2–6) Marion Campbell (1–5)	
1975	1975	NFL	NFC	West	3rd	4	10	0			Marion Campbell	
1976	1976	NFL	NFC	West	4th	4	10	0			Marion Campbell (1–4) Pat Peppler (3–6)	
1977	1977	NFL	NFC	West	2nd	7	7	0			Leeman Bennett	
1978 (Note: In 1978, the NFL expanded its regular season schedule, which had been 14 games since 1961, to 16 games.)	1978	NFL	NFC	West	2nd^	9	7	0	Won Wild Card playoffs (Eagles) 14–13; Lost Divisional playoffs (at Cowboys) 20–27		Leeman Bennett	
1979	1979	NFL	NFC	West	3rd	6	10	0			Leeman Bennett	
1980	1980	NFL	NFC	West†	1st†	12	4	0	Lost Divisional playoffs (Cowboys) 27–30	Buddy Curry (Co-DROY); Al Richardson (Co-DROY)	Leeman Bennett	
1981	1981	NFL	NFC	West	2nd	7	9	0			Leeman Bennett	
1982	1982	NFL	NFC	— (Note: The 1982 season was shortened to nine games after a players' strike. The top eight teams in each conference advanced to the playoffs.)	5th^	5	4	0	Lost First Round playoffs (at Vikings) 24–30		Leeman Bennett	
1983	1983	NFL	NFC	West	4th	7	9	0			Dan Henning	
1984	1984	NFL	NFC	West	4th	4	12	0			Dan Henning	
1985	1985	NFL	NFC	West	4th	4	12	0			Dan Henning	
1986	1986	NFL	NFC	West	3rd	7	8	1			Dan Henning	
1987 (Note: The 1987 NFL strike caused the schedule to be reduced to 15 games.)	1987	NFL	NFC	West	4th	3	12	0			Marion Campbell	
1988	1988	NFL	NFC	West	4th	5	11	0			Marion Campbell	
1989	1989	NFL	NFC	West	4th	3	13	0			Marion Campbell (3–9) Jim Hanifan (0–4)	
1990	1990	NFL	NFC	West	4th	5	11	0			Jerry Glanville	
1991	1991	NFL	NFC	West	2nd^	10	6	0	Won Wild Card playoffs (at Saints) 27–20; Lost Divisional playoffs (at Redskins) 7–24		Jerry Glanville	
1992	1992	NFL	NFC	West	3rd	6	10	0			Jerry Glanville	
1993	1993	NFL	NFC	West	3rd	6	10	0			Jerry Glanville	
1994	1994	NFL	NFC	West	3rd	7	9	0			June Jones	
1995	1995	NFL	NFC	West	2nd^	9	7	0	Lost Wild Card playoffs (at Packers) 20–37		June Jones	
1996	1996	NFL	NFC	West	4th	3	13	0			June Jones	
1997	1997	NFL	NFC	West	3rd	7	9	0			Dan Reeves	
1998	1998	NFL	NFC#	West†	1st†	14	2	0	Won Divisional playoffs (49ers) 20–18; Won NFC Championship (at Vikings) 30–27 (OT); Lost Super Bowl XXXIII (vs. Broncos) 19–34	Dan Reeves (COY)	Dan Reeves	
1999	1999	NFL	NFC	West	3rd	5	11	0			Dan Reeves	
2000	2000	NFL	NFC	West	5th	4	12	0			Dan Reeves	
2001	2001	NFL	NFC	West	4th	7	9	0			Dan Reeves	
2002	2002	NFL	NFC	South (Note: Following the 2002 NFL realignment, the Falcons played in the NFC South division.)	2nd^	9	6	1	Won Wild Card playoffs (at Packers) 27–7; Lost Divisional playoffs (at Eagles) 6–20		Dan Reeves	
2003	2003	NFL	NFC	South	4th	5	11	0			Dan Reeves (3–10) Wade Phillips (2–1)	
2004	2004	NFL	NFC	South†	1st†	11	5	0	Won Divisional playoffs (Rams) 47–17; Lost NFC Championship (at Eagles) 10–27		Jim L. Mora	
2005	2005	NFL	NFC	South	3rd	8	8	0			Jim L. Mora	
2006	2006	NFL	NFC	South	3rd	7	9	0			Jim L. Mora	
2007	2007	NFL	NFC	South	4th	4	12	0			Bobby Petrino (3–10) Emmitt Thomas (1–2)	
2008	2008	NFL	NFC	South	2nd^	11	5	0	Lost Wild Card playoffs (at Cardinals) 24–30	Matt Ryan (OROY); Mike Smith (COY); Thomas Dimitroff (EOY)	Mike Smith	
2009	2009	NFL	NFC	South	2nd	9	7	0			Mike Smith	
2010	2010	NFL	NFC	South†	1st†	13	3	0	Lost Divisional playoffs (Packers) 21–48	Thomas Dimitroff (EOY)	Mike Smith	
2011	2011	NFL	NFC	South	2nd^	10	6	0	Lost Wild Card playoffs (at Giants) 2–24		Mike Smith	
2012	2012	NFL	NFC	South†	1st†	13	3	0	Won Divisional playoffs (Seahawks) 30–28; Lost NFC Championship (49ers) 24–28		Mike Smith	
2013	2013	NFL	NFC	South	3rd	4	12	0			Mike Smith	
2014	2014	NFL	NFC	South	3rd	6	10	0			Mike Smith	
2015	2015	NFL	NFC	South	2nd	8	8	0			Dan Quinn	
2016	2016	NFL	NFC#	South†	1st†	11	5	0	Won Divisional playoffs (Seahawks) 36–20; Won NFC Championship (Packers) 44–21; Lost Super Bowl LI (vs. Patriots) 28–34 (OT)	Matt Ryan (MVP), (OPOY)	Dan Quinn	
2017	2017	NFL	NFC	South	3rd^	10	6	0	Won Wild Card playoffs (at Rams) 26–13; Lost Divisional playoffs (at Eagles) 10–15		Dan Quinn	
2018	2018	NFL	NFC	South	2nd	7	9	0			Dan Quinn	
2019	2019	NFL	NFC	South	2nd	7	9	0			Dan Quinn	
2020	2020	NFL	NFC	South	4th	4	12	0			Dan Quinn (0–5) Raheem Morris (4–7)	
2021 (Note: In 2021, the NFL expanded its regular season schedule, which had been 16 games since 1978, to 17 games.)	2021	NFL	NFC	South	3rd	7	10	0			Arthur Smith	
2022	2022	NFL	NFC	South	4th	7	10	0			Arthur Smith	
2023	2023	NFL	NFC	South	3rd	7	10	0			Arthur Smith	
2024	2024	NFL	NFC	South	2nd	8	9	0			Raheem Morris	
2025	2025	NFL	NFC	South	3rd	8	9	0			Raheem Morris	
Totals						406	521	6	All-time regular season record (1966–2025)			
Totals						10	14	—	All-time postseason record (1966–2025)			
Totals						416	535	6	All-time regular & postseason record (1966–2025)			

== See also ==
- History of the Atlanta Falcons
