= List of Houston Texans seasons =

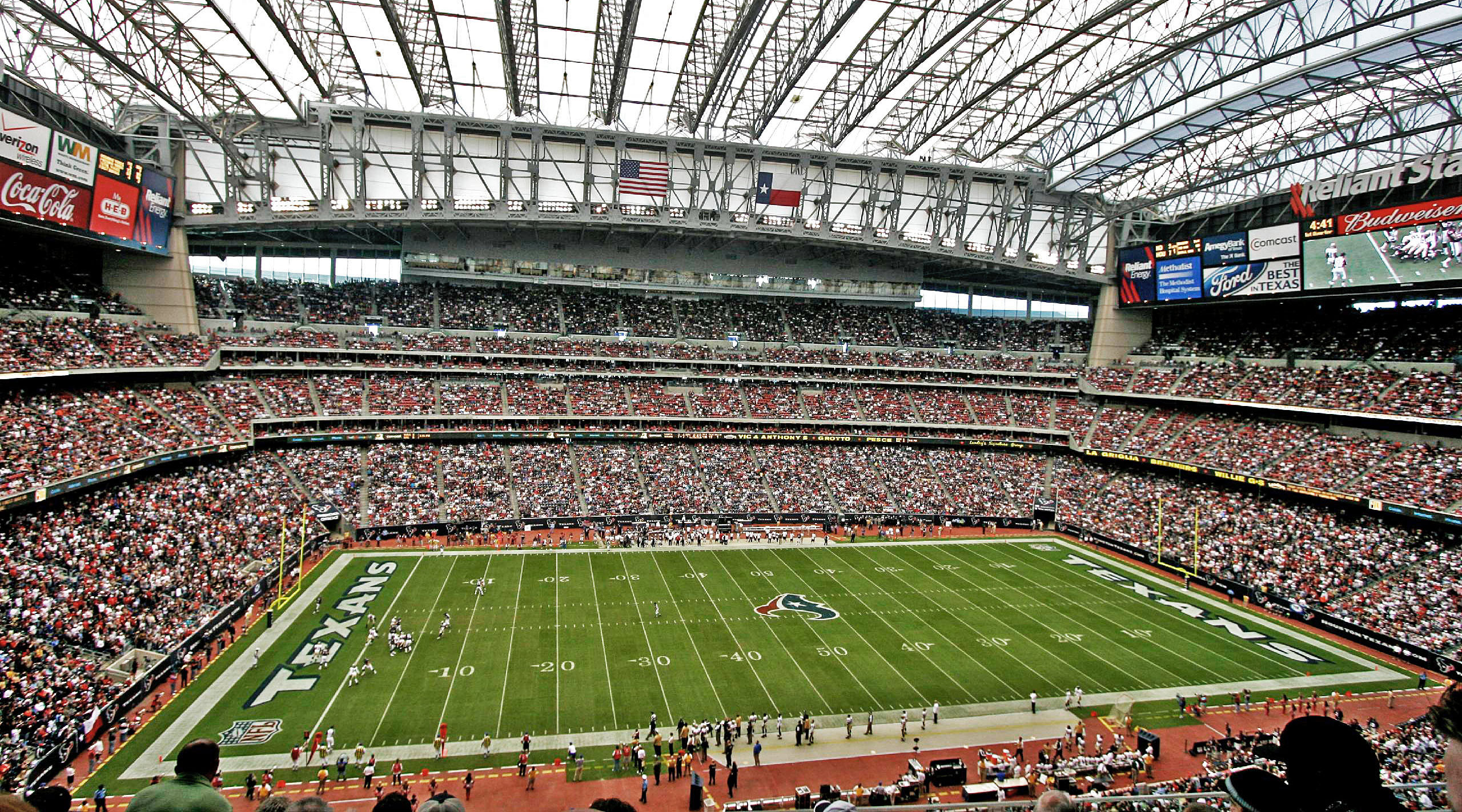
The Houston Texans have played their home games at NRG Stadium since 2002.

The Houston Texans are a professional American football team based in Houston, Texas. The Texans are members of the South division in the American Football Conference (AFC) of the National Football League (NFL). They were founded in 1999 and began play as an expansion team in 2002. The team was owned by Bob McNair until his death in 2018; following McNair's death, the ownership of the team went to his wife, Janice. The Texans are the youngest franchise currently competing in the NFL.

While the Texans mainly struggled in the 2000s, the franchise experienced an upturn during the 2010s. They first found success in the 2011 season, winning their first division championship and clinching their first playoff berth. The team won their first playoff game that same year, beating the Cincinnati Bengals 31–10. The Texans have gone on to win seven more AFC South division championships in 2012, 2015, 2016, 2018, 2019, 2023, and 2024. They are the only franchise never to have appeared in a conference championship game. They are also one of four franchises never to have appeared in a Super Bowl, alongside the Cleveland Browns, Detroit Lions, and Jacksonville Jaguars. In the Texans' 23-year history, they have an overall regular season record of 162 wins, 209 losses, and 1 tie, plus an overall postseason record of 6 wins and 8 losses. The team currently has eleven winning seasons, two 8–8 seasons, and eleven losing seasons.

== Seasons ==
Key
Super Bowl champions*	Conference champions#	Division champions†	Wild Card berth^

Houston Texans seasonal records
Season	Team	League	Conference	Division	Regular season				Postseason results	Awards^{[Key]}	Head coach	Ref.
Season	Team	League	Conference	Division	Finish	W	L	T	Postseason results	Awards^{[Key]}	Head coach	Ref.
2002	2002	NFL	AFC	South	4th	4	12	0			Dom Capers	
2003	2003	NFL	AFC	South	4th	5	11	0			Dom Capers	
2004	2004	NFL	AFC	South	3rd	7	9	0			Dom Capers	
2005	2005	NFL	AFC	South	4th	2	14	0			Dom Capers	
2006	2006	NFL	AFC	South	4th	6	10	0		DeMeco Ryans (DROY)	Gary Kubiak	
2007	2007	NFL	AFC	South	4th	8	8	0			Gary Kubiak	
2008	2008	NFL	AFC	South	3rd	8	8	0			Gary Kubiak	
2009	2009	NFL	AFC	South	2nd	9	7	0		Brian Cushing (DROY)	Gary Kubiak	
2010	2010	NFL	AFC	South	3rd	6	10	0			Gary Kubiak	
2011	2011	NFL	AFC	South†	1st†	10	6	0	Won Wild Card playoffs (Bengals) 31–10; Lost Divisional playoffs (at Ravens) 13–20		Gary Kubiak	
2012	2012	NFL	AFC	South†	1st†	12	4	0	Won Wild Card playoffs (Bengals) 19–13; Lost Divisional playoffs (at Patriots) 28–41	J. J. Watt (DPOY)	Gary Kubiak	
2013	2013	NFL	AFC	South	4th	2	14	0			Gary Kubiak (2–11) (Note: Indicates the coach's record. (Wins–Losses)) Wade Phillips (0–3)	
2014	2014	NFL	AFC	South	2nd	9	7	0		J. J. Watt (DPOY)	Bill O'Brien	
2015	2015	NFL	AFC	South†	1st†	9	7	0	Lost Wild Card playoffs (Chiefs) 0–30	J. J. Watt (DPOY)	Bill O'Brien	
2016	2016	NFL	AFC	South†	1st†	9	7	0	Won Wild Card playoffs (Raiders) 27–14; Lost Divisional playoffs (at Patriots) 16–34		Bill O'Brien	
2017	2017	NFL	AFC	South	4th	4	12	0		J. J. Watt (WPMOY)	Bill O'Brien	
2018	2018	NFL	AFC	South†	1st†	11	5	0	Lost Wild Card playoffs (Colts) 7–21		Bill O'Brien	
2019	2019	NFL	AFC	South†	1st†	10	6	0	Won Wild Card playoffs (Bills) 22–19 (OT); Lost Divisional playoffs (at Chiefs) 31–51		Bill O'Brien	
2020	2020	NFL	AFC	South	3rd	4	12	0			Bill O'Brien (0–4) Romeo Crennel (4–8)	
2021	2021	NFL	AFC	South	3rd	4	13	0			David Culley	
2022	2022	NFL	AFC	South	4th	3	13	1			Lovie Smith	
2023	2023	NFL	AFC	South†	1st†	10	7	0	Won Wild Card playoffs (Browns) 45–14; Lost Divisional playoffs (at Ravens) 10–34	C. J. Stroud (OROY); Will Anderson Jr. (DROY)	DeMeco Ryans	
2024	2024	NFL	AFC	South†	1st†	10	7	0	Won Wild Card playoffs (Chargers) 32–12; Lost Divisional playoffs (at Chiefs) 14–23		DeMeco Ryans	
2025	2025	NFL	AFC	South	2nd^	12	5	0	Won Wild Card playoffs (at Steelers) 30–6; Lost Divisional playoffs (at Patriots) 16–28		DeMeco Ryans	
Total						174	214	1	All-time regular season record (2002–2025)			
Total						7	9	—	All-time postseason record (2002–2025)			
Total						181	223	1	All-time regular & postseason record (2002–2025)			

Key for the "Awards" section^{Key}
OROY	National Football League Offensive Rookie of the Year Award
DROY	National Football League Defensive Rookie of the Year Award
DPOY	National Football League Defensive Player of the Year Award
WPMOY	Walter Payton NFL Man of the Year Award

== See also ==
- History of the Houston Texans

== Notes ==
Notes

Footnotes
