= List of NFL franchise post-season streaks =

This list includes the all-time and the active consecutive NFL playoff appearances. Aside from the NFL playoff appearance streaks, this list also includes Championship Game appearance streaks and the NFL championships win streak. Streaks from the AFL are also included.

The Green Bay Packers hold the longest consecutive NFL title streak with three consecutive crowns, which they accomplished on two separate occasions: once in the 1920s, before postseason games were introduced, and once in the 1960s, which included winning seven playoff games and the first two Super Bowls.

The New England Patriots hold the record for most consecutive playoff games won, with ten postseason wins in a row from 2001–2005 including three Super Bowl wins. The Patriots also hold the longest playoff appearance streak, with 11 consecutive appearances from 2009 to 2019. The second-longest such streak is the Kansas City Chiefs' streak of 10 consecutive appearances from 2015 to 2024.

== Active streaks ==
=== NFL playoffs appearance streaks ===
- Bold italics including longest streak indicates that the streak is also the team's longest-ever streak for consecutive playoff seasons.

Current consecutive playoff appearances
Seasons	2019	2020	2021	2022	2023	2024	2025	2026
7	Buffalo Bills' longest streak							
		5	Philadelphia Eagles tied longest streak					
				3	Los Angeles Rams			
				3	Green Bay Packers			
				3	Houston Texans longest streak			
				3	Pittsburgh Steelers			
					2	Denver Broncos		
					2	Los Angeles Chargers		
						1	Seattle	
						1	Chicago	
						1	San Francisco	
						1	New England	
						1	Jacksonville	
						1	Carolina	
Seasons	2019	2020	2021	2022	2023	2024	2025	2026

^	Longest streak in team history
†	Tied for longest streak in team history

List of 2025 active streaks
Seasons	Team	Years	Division crowns won during streak	Conference titles won during streak	Super Bowls won during streak
7	Buffalo Bills ^	2019–25	(5) 2020–24	—	—
5	Philadelphia Eagles	2021–25	(3) 2022, 2024–25	(2) 2022, 2024	2024 (LIX)
3	Los Angeles Rams	2023–25	(1) 2024	—	—
3	Green Bay Packers	2023–25	—	—	—
3	Houston Texans ^	2023–25	(2) 2023–24	—	—
3	Pittsburgh Steelers	2023–25	(1) 2025	—	—
2	Denver Broncos	2024–25	(1) 2025	—	—
2	Los Angeles Chargers	2024–25	—	—	—
1	Seattle Seahawks	2025	(1) 2025	(1) 2025	2025 (LX)
1	Chicago Bears	2025	(1) 2025	—	—
1	San Francisco 49ers	2025	—	—	—
1	New England Patriots	2025	(1) 2025	(1) 2025	—
1	Jacksonville Jaguars	2025	(1) 2025	—	—
1	Carolina Panthers	2025	(1) 2025	—	—

=== Breakdown by division ===
2025 season
Division	Team	Seasons
AFC East	Buffalo Bills	7
AFC East	New England Patriots	1
AFC North	Pittsburgh Steelers	3
AFC South	Houston Texans	3
AFC South	Jacksonville Jaguars	1
AFC West	Denver Broncos	2
AFC West	Los Angeles Chargers	2
NFC East	Philadelphia Eagles	5
NFC North	Green Bay Packers	3
NFC North	Chicago Bears	1
NFC South	Carolina Panthers	1
NFC West	Los Angeles Rams	3
NFC West	Seattle Seahawks	1
NFC West	San Francisco 49ers	1

=== NFL playoffs win streaks ===
This is a list of consecutive seasons in which a team has won at least one playoff game.

^	Longest streak in team history
†	Tied for longest streak in team history

Seasons	Team	Years	Games won			
Seasons	Team	Years	Wildcard	Divisional	Conference	Super Bowl
6	Buffalo Bills ^	2020	w	w		
6	Buffalo Bills ^	2021	w			
6	Buffalo Bills ^	2022	w			
6	Buffalo Bills ^	2023	w			
6	Buffalo Bills ^	2024	w	w		
6	Buffalo Bills ^	2025	w			
3	Houston Texans ^	2023	w			
3	Houston Texans ^	2024	w			
3	Houston Texans ^	2025	w			
2	Los Angeles Rams	2024	w			
2	Los Angeles Rams	2025	w	w		
1	Chicago Bears	2025	w			
1	San Francisco 49ers	2025	w			
1	New England Patriots	2025	w	w	w	
1	Denver Broncos	2025		w		
1	Seattle Seahawks	2025		w	w	w

== All-time streaks ==
=== Longest consecutive playoff appearance streak ===
Streaks can be verified at Pro Football Reference.com Team Franchise Pages
Since April 2025 the NFL has included the AAFC records. This means that the Cleveland Browns now have a 10 year playoff streak.

Streak is ongoing as of 2025 NFL season.

Streak length	Teams
11	Patriots
10	Chiefs · Browns
9	Cowboys · Colts
8	49ers · Packers · Rams · Steelers
7	Oilers (Titans) · Bills
6	Raiders · Vikings
5	Dolphins (x 3) · Seahawks (x 2) · Bears · Bengals · Broncos · Buccaneers · Eagles · Ravens
4	Chargers · Giants · Jaguars · Redskins (Commanders) · Saints
3	Lions (x 2) · Falcons · Panthers · Texans
2	Jets (x 5) · Cardinals (x 4)

Timeline for each teams' longest streak.

Teams' longest consecutive playoff appearances all time
1940s					1950s							1960s			1970s										1980s										1990s					
5	6	7	8	9	0	1	2	3	4	5	6	7	8	9	0	1	2	3	4	5	6	7	8	9	0	1	2	3	4	5	6	7	8	9	0	1	2	3	4	5
		Chicago Cardinals 2					Detroit Lions 3						New York Jets 2						St. Louis Cardinals 2							New York Jets 2				New York Jets 2								Detroit Lions 3		
	Cleveland Browns 10															Washington Redskins 4				Dallas Cowboys 9												Houston Oilers 7								
																	Pittsburgh Steelers 8																							
																		Los Angeles Rams 8										San Francisco 49ers 8												
																	Oakland Raiders 6																							
																		Minnesota Vikings 6						San Diego Chargers 4					Chicago Bears 5											
															Miami Dolphins 5											Miami Dolphins 5														

Bold and light blue is an active streak

Teams' longest consecutive playoff appearances all time
1990s				2000s										2010s										2020s									
6	7	8	9	0	1	2	3	4	5	6	7	8	9	0	1	2	3	4	5	6	7	8	9	0	1	2	3	4	5	6	7	8	9
						Indianapolis Colts 9									Cincinnati Bengals 5																		
Jacksonville Jaguars 4				Philadelphia Eagles 5					New York Giants 4				Green Bay Packers 8								New Orleans Saints 4												
													New England Patriots 11											Tampa Bay Buccaneers 5									
										San Diego Chargers 4									Kansas City Chiefs 10														
	Miami Dolphins 5											Baltimore Ravens 5					Carolina Panthers 3								Philadelphia Eagles 5								
					New York Jets 2								New York Jets 2		Denver Broncos 5																		
												Arizona Cardinals 2		Atlanta Falcons 3				Arizona Cardinals 2					Buffalo Bills 7										
							Seattle Seahawks 5									Seattle Seahawks 5											Houston Texans 3						

=== Longest consecutive streak with a playoff win ===
Streaks can be verified at Pro Football Reference.com Team Franchise Pages
Since April 2025 the NFL has included the AAFC records. This means that the Cleveland Browns now have a 5 year playoff win streak.

Streak length	Teams
8	Patriots
7	Chiefs
6	Bills · Cowboys
5	Browns· Eagles · Packers · Raiders · Ravens · Seahawks
4	Steelers · Vikings
3	49ers (x 5) · Chargers · Dolphins (x 2) · Giants · Rams · Texans · Washington
2	Bears (x 2) · Bengals · Broncos (x 2) · Buccaneers · Cardinals · Colts (x 4) · Falcons · Jaguars · Jets · Lions · Panthers · Saints · Titans (Oilers) (x 4)

Timeline for each teams' longest streak.

Teams' longest consecutive seasons with a playoff win all time (minimum 2 seasons)
1940s						1950s										1960s					1970s									
0	1	6	7	8	9	0	1	2	3	4	5	6	7	8	9	0	1	2	8	9	0	1	2	3	4	5	6	7	8	9
Chicago Bears 2		Cleveland Browns 5						Detroit Lions 2						Baltimore Colts 2		Houston Oilers 2					Baltimore Colts 2			Oakland Raiders 5					Houston Oilers 2	
																						Miami Dolphins 3			Los Angeles Rams 3					

Teams' longest consecutive seasons with a playoff win all time (minimum 2 seasons)
1980s										1990s										2000s				
0	1	2	3	4	5	6	7	8	9	0	1	2	3	4	5	6	7	8	9	0	1	2	3	4
San Diego Chargers 3				Chicago Bears 2		Denver Broncos 2		San Francisco 49ers 3			Dallas Cowboys 6						Minnesota Vikings 4						Indianapolis Colts 2	
				New York Giants 3			Houston Oilers 2							Pittsburgh Steelers 4				Jacksonville Jaguars 2		Philadelphia Eagles 5				
						Cleveland Browns 2				Washington Redskins 3			Green Bay Packers 5					Miami Dolphins 3				Tennessee Titans 2		
												San Francisco 49ers 3				San Francisco 49ers 3								
																	Denver Broncos 2							

Bold and light blue is an active streak

Teams' longest consecutive seasons with a playoff win all time (minimum 2 seasons)
2000s		2010s										2020s									
8	9	0	1	2	3	4	5	6	7	8	9	0	1	2	3	4	5	6	7	8	9
Baltimore Ravens 5					Indianapolis Colts 2							Tampa Bay Buccaneers 2			Houston Texans 3						
Arizona Cardinals 2			New England Patriots 8										Cincinnati Bengals 2								
	New York Jets 2		San Francisco 49ers 3			Carolina Panthers 2		Atlanta Falcons 2		Kansas City Chiefs 7											
				Seattle Seahawks 5					New Orleans Saints 2			Buffalo Bills 6									
													San Francisco 49ers 3								

=== NFL / AFL / AAFC playoff appearance streaks ===
When sorting, the following are grouped together
Indianapolis and Baltimore Colts
Los Angeles and St. Louis Rams
Oakland and Los Angeles Raiders
Houston Oilers and Tennessee Titans

^	Denotes active streak

NFL champions (1920–1969)	AFL champions (1960–1969)	Super Bowl champions (1970–present)	NFL champions* and Super Bowl champions**

List of streaks
Seasons	Team	Streak duration	Division crowns won during streak		League championships during streak
Seasons	Team	Streak duration	Wins	Seasons	League championships during streak
11	New England Patriots	2009–2019	11	2009–2019	2014 (XLIX), 2016 (LI), 2018 (LIII)
10	Cleveland Browns	1946–1955	9	1946–1948; 1950–1955 ^{[a]}	1946, 1947, 1948, 1949 (AAFC); 1950, 1954, 1955 (NFL)
10	Kansas City Chiefs	2015–2024	9	2016–2024	2019 (LIV), 2022 (LVII), 2023 (LVIII)
9	Dallas Cowboys	1975–1983	5	1976–1979, 1981	1977 (XII)
9	Indianapolis Colts	2002–2010	7	2003–2007, 2009–2010	2006 (XLI)
8	Dallas Cowboys	1966–1973	6	1967–1971, 1973	1971 (VI)
8	Pittsburgh Steelers	1972–1979	7	1972, 1974–1979	1974 (IX), 1975 (X), 1978 (XIII), 1979 (XIV)
8	Los Angeles Rams	1973–1980	7	1973–1979	—
8	San Francisco 49ers	1983–1990	7	1983–1984, 1986–1990	1984 (XIX), 1988 (XXIII), 1989 (XXIV)
8	Green Bay Packers	2009–2016	5	2011–2014, 2016	2010 (XLV)
7	Houston Oilers	1987–1993	2	1991, 1993	—
7	San Francisco 49ers	1992–1998	5	1992–1995, 1997	1994 (XXIX)
7^	Buffalo Bills	2019–2025	5	2020–2024	—
6	Oakland Raiders	1972–1977	5	1972–1976	1976 (XI)
6	Minnesota Vikings	1973–1978	6	1973–1978	—
6	Buffalo Bills	1988–1993	5	1988–1991, 1993	—
6	Kansas City Chiefs	1990–1995	2	1993, 1995	—
6	Dallas Cowboys	1991–1996	5	1992–1996	1992 (XXVII), 1993 (XXVIII), 1995 (XXX)
6	Pittsburgh Steelers	1992–1997	5	1992, 1994–1997	—
6	Green Bay Packers	1993–1998	3	1995–1997	1996 (XXXI)
5	Miami Dolphins	1970–1974	4	1971–1974	1972 (VII), 1973 (VIII)
5	Miami Dolphins	1981–1985	4	1981, 1983–1985	—
5	Chicago Bears	1984–1988	5	1984–1988	1985 (XX)
5	Cleveland Browns	1985–1989	4	1985–1987, 1989	—
5	Minnesota Vikings	1996–2000	2	1998, 2000	—
5	Miami Dolphins	1997–2001	1	2000	—
5	Philadelphia Eagles	2000–2004	4	2001–2004	—
5	New England Patriots	2003–2007	5	2003–2007	2003 (XXXVIII), 2004 (XXXIX)
5	Seattle Seahawks	2003–2007	4	2004–2007	—
5	Baltimore Ravens	2008–2012	2	2011–2012	2012 (XLVII)
5	Cincinnati Bengals	2011–2015	2	2013, 2015	—
5	Denver Broncos	2011–2015	5	2011–2015	2015 (50)
5	Seattle Seahawks	2012–2016	3	2013–2014, 2016	2013 (XLVIII)
5	Tampa Bay Buccaneers	2020–2024	4	2021–2024	2020 (LV)
5 ^	Philadelphia Eagles	2021–2025	3	2022, 2024–2025	2024 (LIX)
4	Chicago Bears	1940–1943	4	1940–1943	1940, 1941, 1943
4	Los Angeles Rams	1949–1952	3	1949–1951 ^{[b]}	1951
4	Buffalo Bills	1963–1966	3	1964–1966	1964, 1965
4	Oakland Raiders	1967–1970	4	1967–1970	1967
4	Minnesota Vikings	1968–1971	4	1968–1971	1969
4	Washington Redskins	1971–1974	1	1972	—
4	Philadelphia Eagles	1978–1981	1	1980	—
4	San Diego Chargers	1979–1982	3	1979–1981	—
4	Los Angeles Raiders	1982–1985	3	1982–1983, 1985	1983 (XVIII)
4	Los Angeles Rams	1983–1986	1	1985	—
4	Jacksonville Jaguars	1996–1999	2	1998–1999	—
4	Tampa Bay Buccaneers	1999–2002	2	1999, 2002	2002 (XXXVII)
4	Green Bay Packers	2001–2004	3	2002–2004	—
4	New York Giants	2005–2008	2	2005, 2008	2007 (XLII)
4	San Diego Chargers	2006–2009	4	2006–2009	—
4	Pittsburgh Steelers	2014–2017	3	2014, 2016–2017	—
4	New Orleans Saints	2017–2020	4	2017–2020	—
3	New York Giants	1933–1935	3	1933–1935	1934
3	Philadelphia Eagles	1947–1949	3	1947–1949	1948. 1949
3	Detroit Lions	1952–1954	3	1952–1954	1952, 1953
3	Green Bay Packers	1960–1962	3	1960–1962	1961, 1962
3	Houston Oilers	1960–1962	3	1960–1962	1960, 1961
3	New York Giants	1961–1963	3	1961–1963	—
3	San Diego Chargers	1963–1965	3	1963–1965	1963
3	Green Bay Packers	1965–1967	3	1965–1967	1965*, 1966*, 1967*, 1966 (I)**, 1967 (II)**^{[c]}
3	Cleveland Browns	1967–1969	3	1967–1969	—
3	San Francisco 49ers	1970–1972	3	1970–1972	—
3	Baltimore Colts	1975–1977	3	1975–1977	—
3	Denver Broncos	1977–1979	2	1977–1978	—
3	Houston Oilers	1978–1980	0	—	—
3	Washington Redskins	1982–1984	3	1982–1984	1982 (XVII)
3	Pittsburgh Steelers	1982–1984	2	1983–1984	—
3	New York Giants	1984–1986	1	1986	1986 (XXI)
3	Minnesota Vikings	1987–1989	1	1989	—
3	Philadelphia Eagles	1988–1990	1	1988	—
3	Washington Redskins	1990–1992	1	1991	1991 (XXVI)
3	New Orleans Saints	1990–1992	1	1991	—
3	Minnesota Vikings	1992–1994	2	1992, 1994	—
3	Detroit Lions	1993–1995	1	1993	—
3	Denver Broncos	1996–1998	2	1996, 1998	1997 (XXXII), 1998 (XXXIII)
3	New England Patriots	1996–1998	2	1996–1997	—
3	St. Louis Rams	1999–2001	2	1999, 2001	1999 (XXXIV)
3	Oakland Raiders	2000–2002	3	2000–2002	—
3	Denver Broncos	2003–2005	1	2005	—
3	Philadelphia Eagles	2008–2010	1	2010	—
3	New Orleans Saints	2009–2011	2	2009, 2011	2009 (XLIV)
3	Atlanta Falcons	2010–2012	2	2010, 2012	—
3	San Francisco 49ers	2011–2013	2	2011–2012	—
3	Indianapolis Colts	2012–2014	2	2013–2014	—
3	Carolina Panthers	2013–2015	3	2013–2015	—
3	Philadelphia Eagles	2017–2019	2	2017, 2019	2017 (LII)
3	Seattle Seahawks	2018–2020	1	2020	—
3	Baltimore Ravens	2018–2020	2	2018–2019	—
3	Tennessee Titans	2019–2021	2	2020–2021	—
3	Green Bay Packers	2019–2021	3	2019–2021	—
3	San Francisco 49ers	2021–2023	2	2022–2023	—
3	Dallas Cowboys	2021–2023	2	2021, 2023	—
3	Baltimore Ravens	2022–2024	2	2023–2024	—
3 ^	Los Angeles Rams	2023–2025	1	2024	—
3 ^	Green Bay Packers	2023–2025	0	—	—
3 ^	Houston Texans	2023–2025	2	2023–2024	—
3 ^	Pittsburgh Steelers	2023–2025	1	2025	—
Seasons	Team	Streak duration	Division crowns won during streak		League championships during streak
Seasons	Team	Streak duration	Wins	Seasons	League championships during streak

- ^{a} AAFC Western division Champs 1946–1948. No AAFC Divisions in 1949. No NFL Divisions from 1950–1966. Browns were American Conference Champs 1950–1952 and Eastern Champs 1953–1955.
- ^{b} No NFL Divisions from 1950–1966. Rams were the National Conference Champs in 1950 & 1951.
- ^{c} Super Bowls did not determine AFL or NFL League Champion before 1970 merger. Green Bay won the NFL Championships and the Super Bowls in the 1966 and 1967 seasons.

=== Championship game appearance streaks ===
Championships from 1920–1969 seasons.
In April 2025 the NFL recognized the AAFC records. This increased the Cleveland Browns appearance streak to 10 years.

NFL champions (1920–1969)	AAFC Champions (1946–1949)	AFL Champions (1960–1969)

References
Team	Seasons	Championship game appearance streak	Championships won during streak
Cleveland Browns	10	1946–1955	1946 – 1947 – 1948 – 1949
Cleveland Browns	10	1946–1955	1950 – 1954 – 1955
Chicago Bears	4	1940–1943	1940 – 1941 – 1943
Philadelphia Eagles	3	1947–1949	1948 – 1949
Los Angeles Rams	3	1949–1951	1951
Detroit Lions	3	1952–1954	1952 – 1953
Houston Oilers	3	1960–1962	1960 - 1961
New York Giants	3	1933–1935	1934
Green Bay Packers	3	1960–1962	1961 - 1962
New York Giants	3	1961–1963	—
San Diego Chargers	3	1963–1965	1963
Buffalo Bills	3	1964–1966	1964 - 1965
Green Bay Packers	3	1965–1967	1965 - 1966 - 1967
Oakland Raiders	3	1967–1969	1967
Chicago Bears	2	1933–1934	1933
Washington Redskins	2	1936–1937	1937
New York Giants	2	1938–1939	1938
Green Bay Packers	2	1938–1939	1939
Washington Redskins	2	1942–1943	1942
Chicago Cardinals	2	1947–1948	1947
Baltimore Colts	2	1958–1959	1958 - 1959
New York Giants	2	1958–1959	—
San Diego Chargers	2	1960–1961	—
Cleveland Browns	2	1964–1965	1964
Dallas Cowboys	2	1966–1967	—
Cleveland Browns	2	1968–1969	—

=== Super Bowl appearance streaks ===
Appearance streaks up through the end of the 2025 season.

References
Team	Seasons	Super Bowl appearance streak	Super Bowls won during streak
Buffalo Bills	4	1990–1993	—
Miami Dolphins	3	1971–1973	1972 - 1973
New England Patriots	3	2016–2018	2016, 2018
Kansas City Chiefs	3	2022–2024	2022 - 2023
Green Bay Packers	2	1966–1967	1966 - 1967
Dallas Cowboys	2	1970–1971	1971
Minnesota Vikings	2	1973–1974	—
Pittsburgh Steelers	2	1974–1975	1974 - 1975
Dallas Cowboys	2	1977–1978	1977
Pittsburgh Steelers	2	1978–1979	1978 - 1979
Washington Redskins	2	1982–1983	1982
Denver Broncos	2	1986–1987	—
San Francisco 49ers	2	1988–1989	1988 - 1989
Dallas Cowboys	2	1992–1993	1992 - 1993
Green Bay Packers	2	1996–1997	1996
Denver Broncos	2	1997–1998	1997 - 1998
New England Patriots	2	2003–2004	2003 - 2004
Seattle Seahawks	2	2013–2014	2013
Kansas City Chiefs	2	2019–2020	2019

=== Championship win streaks ===
Championships from 1920–1969 seasons.

NFL champions (1920–1969)	AAFC Champions (1946–1949)	AFL Champions (1960–1969)

List of streaks
Seasons	Team	Championship win streak	Notes
5	Cleveland Browns	1946 – 1947 – 1948 – 1949	
5	Cleveland Browns	1950	
3	Green Bay Packers	1929 - 1930 - 1931	Best win/loss %^{[a]}
3	Green Bay Packers	1965 - 1966 - 1967	
2	Canton Bulldogs	1922 - 1923	Best win/loss %^{[a]}
2	Chicago Bears	1932 - 1933	Best win/loss % 1932; 1st playoff game winner 1933^{[b]}
2	Chicago Bears	1940 - 1941	
2	Philadelphia Eagles	1948 - 1949	
2	Detroit Lions	1952 - 1953	
2	Cleveland Browns	1954 - 1955	
2	Baltimore Colts	1958 - 1959	
2	Houston Oilers	1960 - 1961	
2	Green Bay Packers	1961 - 1962	
2	Buffalo Bills	1964 - 1965	

- ^{a} NFL Champions were named from 1920 through 1932 by highest win percentage (ties not counted). There were no official playoff games till the 1933 season.
- ^{b} The Bears were named the NFL Champions in 1932 after winning an unofficial playoff game played indoors due to extremely cold weather. The game is recorded as a regular season game that was needed to break a tie between the Bears and the Portsmouth Spartans (now the Detroit Lions).

=== Super Bowl win streaks ===
List of Streaks
Seasons	Team	Super Bowl win streak
2	Green Bay Packers	1966 (I) – 1967 (II)
2	Miami Dolphins	1972 (VII) – 1973 (VIII)
2	Pittsburgh Steelers	1974 (IX) – 1975 (X)
2	Pittsburgh Steelers	1978 (XIII) – 1979 (XIV)
2	San Francisco 49ers	1988 (XXIII) – 1989 (XXIV)
2	Dallas Cowboys	1992 (XXVII) – 1993 (XXVIII)
2	Denver Broncos	1997 (XXXII) – 1998 (XXXIII)
2	New England Patriots	2003 (XXXVIII) – 2004 (XXXIX)
2	Kansas City Chiefs	2022 (LVII) – 2023 (LVIII)

== Historical team streaks ==
=== Most consecutive post-season wins in team history ===
This is a sortable table of all 32 current NFL teams. Twelve teams have multiple winning streaks where they won an equal number of post season games before a loss.

Updated through 2025–26 playoffs

^	Denotes active streak

Team	Seasons	Games won	Playoff games	Opponent	Streak ending loss
Arizona Cardinals	2008	3	2008 Wild Card; 2008 Divisional; 2008 NFC Champ.	Falcons; Panthers; Eagles	Super Bowl XLIII (Steelers)
Atlanta Falcons; 2 (2 win) streaks	1998	2	1998 Divisional; 1998 NFC Champ.	49ers Vikings	Super Bowl XXXIII (Broncos)
Atlanta Falcons; 2 (2 win) streaks	2016	2	2016 Divisional; 2016 NFC Champ.	Seahawks; Packers	Super Bowl LI (Patriots)
Baltimore Ravens; 2 (5 win) streaks	2000–2001	5	2000 Wild Card; 2000 Divisional; 2000 AFC Champ. Super Bowl XXXV; 2001 Wild Card	Broncos; Titans; Raiders; Giants; Dolphins	2001 Divisional (Steelers)
Baltimore Ravens; 2 (5 win) streaks	2012, 2014	5	2012 Wild Card; 2012 Divisional; 2012 AFC Champ. Super Bowl XLVII; 2014 Wild Card	Colts; Broncos; Patriots; 49ers Steelers	2014 Divisional (Patriots)
Buffalo Bills	1992	3	1992 Wild Card; 1992 Divisional; 1992 AFC Champ.	Oilers; Steelers; Dolphins	Super Bowl XXVII (Cowboys)
Carolina Panthers	2003	3	2003 Wild Card; 2003 Divisional; 2003 NFC Champ.	Cowboys; Rams; Eagles	Super Bowl XXXVIII (Patriots)
Chicago Bears; 2 (3 win) streaks	1940–1941	3	1940 NFL Champ. 1941 Western Div. 1941 NFL Champ.	Redskins; Packers; Giants	1942 NFL Champ. (Redskins)
Chicago Bears; 2 (3 win) streaks	1985	3	1985 Divisional; 1985 NFC Champ. Super Bowl XX	Giants; Rams; Patriots	1986 Divisional (Redskins)
Cincinnati Bengals	2021	3	2021 Wild Card; 2021 Divisional; 2021 AFC Champ.	Raiders; Titans; Chiefs	Super Bowl LVI (Rams)
Cleveland Browns	1946–1950	7	1946 AAFC Champ. 1947 AAFC Champ. 1948 AAFC Champ. 1949 Division; 1949 AAFC Champ. 1950 Am. Conf. 1950 NFL Champ.	NY Yankees; NY Yankees; Buffalo Bills; Buffalo Bills; 49ers NY Giants; LA Rams	1951 NFL Champ. (LA Rams)
Dallas Cowboys	1992–1994	7	1992 Divisional; 1992 NFC Champ. Super Bowl XXVII; 1993 Divisional; 1993 NFC Champ. Super Bowl XXVIII; 1994 Divisional	Eagles; 49ers Bills; Packers; 49ers Bills; Packers	1994 NFC Champ. (49ers)
Denver Broncos	1997–1998	7	1997 Wild Card; 1997 Divisional; 1997 AFC Champ. Super Bowl XXXII; 1998 Divisional; 1998 AFC Champ. Super Bowl XXXIII	Jaguars; Chiefs; Steelers; Packers; Dolphins; Jets; Falcons	2000 Wild Card (Ravens)
Detroit Lions	1935, 1952–1953	4	1935 NFL Champ. 1952 Nat. Conf; 1952 NFL Champ. 1953 NFL Champ.	Giants; Rams; Browns; Browns	1954 NFL Champ. (Browns)
Green Bay Packers	1961–1962, 1965–1967	9	1961 NFL Champ. 1962 NFL Champ. 1965 NFL W Conf. 1965 NFL Champ. 1966 NFL Champ. Super Bowl I 1967 NFL W Conf. 1967 NFL Champ. Super Bowl II	Giants; Giants; Colts; Browns; Cowboys; Chiefs; Rams; Cowboys; Raiders	1972 Divisional (Redskins)
Houston Texans; 7 (1 win) streaks	2011	1	2011 Wild Card	Bengals	2011 Divisional (Ravens)
Houston Texans; 7 (1 win) streaks	2012	1	2012 Wild Card	Bengals	2012 Divisional (Patriots)
Houston Texans; 7 (1 win) streaks	2016	1	2016 Wild Card	Raiders	2016 Divisional (Patriots)
Houston Texans; 7 (1 win) streaks	2019	1	2019 Wild Card	Bills	2019 Divisional (Chiefs)
Houston Texans; 7 (1 win) streaks	2023	1	2023 Wild Card	Browns	2023 Divisional (Ravens)
Houston Texans; 7 (1 win) streaks	2024	1	2024 Wild Card	Chargers	2024 Divisional (Chiefs)
Houston Texans; 7 (1 win) streaks	2025	1	2025 Wild Card	Steelers	2025 Divisional (Patriots)
Indianapolis Colts; 2 (4 win) streaks	1970–1971^{[a]}	4	1970 Divisional; 1970 AFC Champ. Super Bowl V 1971 Divisional	Bengals; Raiders; Cowboys; Browns	1971 AFC Champ. (Dolphins)
Indianapolis Colts; 2 (4 win) streaks	2006	4	2006 Wild Card; 2006 Divisional; 2006 AFC Champ. Super Bowl XLI	Chiefs; Ravens; Patriots; Bears	2007 Divisional (Chargers)
Jacksonville Jaguars; 2 (2 win) streaks	1996	2	1996 Wild Card; 1996 Divisional	Bills; Broncos	1996 AFC Champ. (Patriots)
Jacksonville Jaguars; 2 (2 win) streaks	2017	2	2017 Wild Card; 2017 Divisional	Bills; Steelers	2017 AFC Champ. (Patriots)
Kansas City Chiefs	2022–2024	9	2022 Divisional; 2022 AFC Champ. Super Bowl LVII; 2023 Wild Card; 2023 Divisional; 2023 AFC Champ. Super Bowl LVIII; 2024 Divisional; 2024 AFC Champ.	Jaguars; Bengals; Eagles; Dolphins; Bills; Ravens; 49ers Texans; Bills	Super Bowl LIX (Eagles)
Las Vegas Raiders	1980, 1982^{[b]}	5	1980 Wild Card; 1980 Divisional; 1980 AFC Champ. Super Bowl XV; 1982 1st Round	Oilers; Browns; Chargers; Eagles; Browns	1982 Second Round (Jets)
Los Angeles Chargers	1994^{[c]}	2	1994 Divisional; 1994 AFC Champ.	Dolphins; Steelers	Super Bowl XXIX (49ers)
Los Angeles Chargers	2007^{[c]}	2	2007 Wild Card; 2007 Divisional	Titans; Colts	2007 AFC Champ. (Patriots)
Los Angeles Rams	2021	4	2021 Wild Card; 2021 Divisional; 2021 NFC Champ. Super Bowl LVI	Cardinals; Buccaneers; 49ers Bengals	2023 Wild Card (Lions)
Miami Dolphins	1972–1973	6	1972 Divisional; 1972 AFC Champ. Super Bowl VII; 1973 Divisional; 1973 AFC Champ. Super Bowl VIII	Browns; Steelers; Redskins; Bengals; Raiders; Vikings	1974 Divisional (Raiders)
Minnesota Vikings; 5 (2 win) streaks	1969	2	1969 NFL W Conf. 1969 NFL Champ.	Rams; Browns	Super Bowl IV (Chiefs)
Minnesota Vikings; 5 (2 win) streaks	1973	2	1973 Divisional; 1973 NFC Champ.	Redskins; Cowboys	Super Bowl VIII (Dolphins)
Minnesota Vikings; 5 (2 win) streaks	1974	2	1974 Divisional; 1974 NFC Champ.	Cardinals; Rams	Super Bowl IX (Steelers)
Minnesota Vikings; 5 (2 win) streaks	1976	2	1976 Divisional; 1976 NFC Champ.	Redskins; Rams	Super Bowl XI (Raiders)
Minnesota Vikings; 5 (2 win) streaks	1987	2	1987 Wild Card; 1987 Divisional	Saints; 49ers	1987 NFC Champ. (Redskins)
New England Patriots	2001, 2003–2005	10	2001 Divisional; 2001 AFC Champ. Super Bowl XXXVI; 2003 Divisional; 2003 AFC Champ. Super Bowl XXXVIII; 2004 Divisional; 2004 AFC Champ. Super Bowl XXXIX; 2005 Wild Card	Raiders; Steelers; Rams; Titans; Colts; Panthers; Colts; Steelers; Eagles; Jaguars	2005 Divisional (Broncos)
New Orleans Saints	2009	3	2009 Divisional; 2009 NFC Champ. Super Bowl XLIV	Cardinals; Vikings; Colts	2010 Wild Card (Seahawks)
New York Giants; 3 (4 win) streaks	1990, 1993	4	1990 Divisional; 1990 NFC Champ. Super Bowl XXV; 1993 Wild Card	Bears; 49ers Bills; Vikings	1993 Divisional (49ers)
New York Giants; 3 (4 win) streaks	2007	4	2007 Wild Card; 2007 Divisional; 2007 NFC Champ. Super Bowl XLII	Buccaneers; Cowboys; Packers; Patriots	2008 Divisional (Eagles)
New York Giants; 3 (4 win) streaks	2011	4	2011 Wild Card; 2011 Divisional; 2011 NFC Champ. Super Bowl XLVI	Falcons; Packers; 49ers Patriots	2016 Wild Card (Packers)
New York Jets; 4 (2 win) streaks	1968	2	1968 AFL Champ. Super Bowl III	Raiders; Colts	1969 AFL Divisional (Chiefs)
New York Jets; 4 (2 win) streaks	1982	2	1982 1st Round; 1982 2nd Round	Bengals; Raiders	1982 AFC Champ. (Dolphins)
New York Jets; 4 (2 win) streaks	2009	2	2009 Wild Card; 2009 Divisional	Bengals; Chargers	2009 AFC Champ. (Colts)
New York Jets; 4 (2 win) streaks	2010	2	2010 Wild Card; 2010 Divisional	Colts; Patriots	2010 AFC Champ. (Steelers)
Philadelphia Eagles; 2 (4 win) streaks	2017–2018	4	2017 Divisional; 2017 NFC Champ. Super Bowl LII; 2018 Wild Card	Falcons; Vikings; Patriots; Bears	2018 Divisional (Saints)
Philadelphia Eagles; 2 (4 win) streaks	2024	4	2024 Wild Card; 2024 Divisional; 2024 NFC Champ. Super Bowl LIX	Packers; Rams; Commanders; Chiefs	2025 Wild Card (49ers)
Pittsburgh Steelers	1974–1976	7	1974 Divisional; 1974 AFC Champ. Super Bowl IX; 1975 Divisional; 1975 AFC Champ. Super Bowl X 1976 Divisional	Bills; Raiders; Vikings; Colts; Raiders; Cowboys; Colts	1976 AFC Champ. (Raiders)
San Francisco 49ers	1988–1990	7	1988 Divisional; 1988 NFC Champ. Super Bowl XXIII; 1989 Divisional; 1989 NFC Champ. Super Bowl XXIV; 1990 Divisional	Vikings; Bears; Bengals; Vikings; Rams; Broncos; Redskins	1990 NFC Champ. (Giants)
Seattle Seahawks	2013–2014	5	2013 Divisional; 2013 NFC Champ. Super Bowl XLVIII; 2014 Divisional; 2014 NFC Champ.	Saints; 49ers Broncos; Panthers; Packers	Super Bowl XLIX (Patriots)
Tampa Bay Buccaneers	2020–2021	5	2020 Wild Card; 2020 Divisional; 2020 NFC Champ. Super Bowl LV; 2021 Wild Card	Washington; Saints; Packers; Chiefs; Eagles	2021 Divisional (Rams)
Tennessee Titans	1999	3	1999 Wild Card; 1999 Divisional; 1999 AFC Champ.	Bills; Colts; Jaguars	Super Bowl XXXIV (Rams)
Washington Commanders	1982–1983^{[d]}	6	1982 1st Round; 1982 2nd Round; 1982 NFC Champ. Super Bowl XVII; 1983 Divisional; 1983 NFC Champ.	Lions; Vikings; Cowboys; Dolphins; Rams; 49ers	Super Bowl XVIII (Raiders)
Team	Seasons	Games won	Playoff games	Opponent	Streak ending loss

- ^{a} Streak occurred when the team was the Baltimore Colts.
- ^{b} Streak occurred when the team was the Oakland Raiders in 1980, and the Los Angeles Raiders in 1982.
- ^{c} Streak occurred when the team was the San Diego Chargers.
- ^{d} Streak occurred when the team was the Washington Redskins.

== See also ==
- List of last undefeated NFL teams by season
- List of NFL franchise post-season droughts
