= List of Minnesota Vikings seasons =

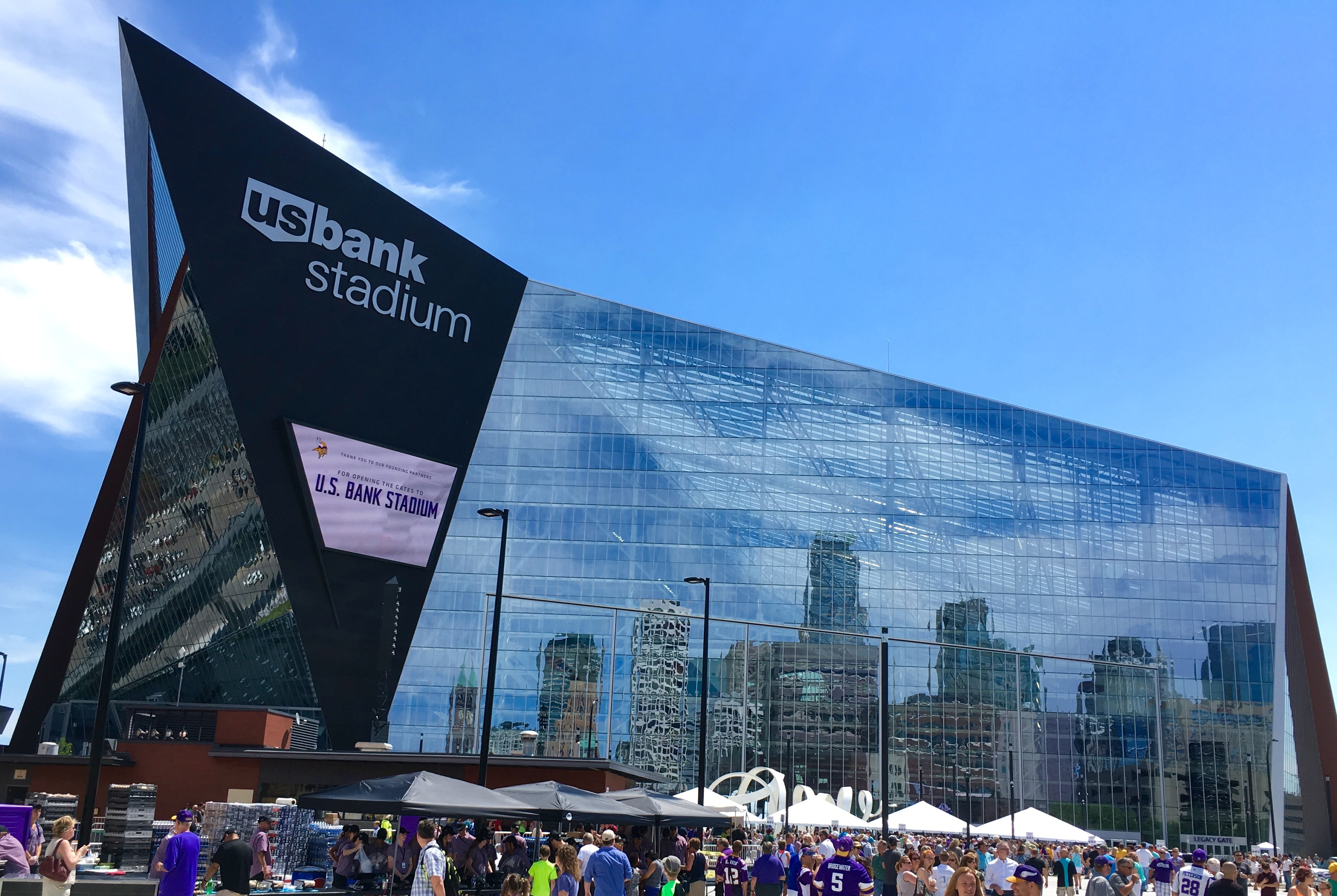
The Vikings have played at U.S. Bank Stadium since 2016.

The Minnesota Vikings are an American football team playing in the National Football League (NFL). The Vikings compete in the NFL as a member club of the league's National Football Conference (NFC) North division. The team was established in 1959, when three Minneapolis businessmen – Bill Boyer, H. P. Skoglund and Max Winter – were awarded a franchise in the new American Football League (AFL). In January 1960, the ownership group forfeited its AFL membership and, along with Bernie Ridder and Ole Haugsrud, was awarded the NFL's 14th franchise, with play to begin in 1961.

Since the franchise's inception, the Vikings have completed 64 seasons of play in the NFL. The team won one NFL Championship in 1969, and was the last team crowned NFL champions before the AFL–NFL merger in 1970. The franchise has been conference champions three times since the merger, but has never won the Super Bowl. The Vikings have been divisional champions 21 times, most among current members of their division. Minnesota has played 1039 regular and postseason games and has appeared in the postseason 32 times.

The team's worst season was 1962, when they won two games, lost eleven, and tied one (a 0.154 winning percentage). Their worst seasons since the NFL changed to a 16-game schedule were in 1984 and 2011, when they could only manage a 3–13 record. The best regular-season record was achieved in 1998, when the Vikings went 15–1, but kicker Gary Anderson, who had gone 35-for-35 in field goal attempts during the regular season, missed a 38-yard attempt with less than three minutes remaining in the NFC Championship Game. With an overtime loss to the Atlanta Falcons, the Vikings became the first 15–1 team in NFL history to not reach the Super Bowl.

== Key ==
BBA	Bert Bell Award
COY	NFL Coach of the Year Award
CPY	NFL Comeback Player of the Year Award
DPY	NFL Defensive Player of the Year Award
GH	George Halas Trophy
MOY	Walter Payton Man of the Year Award
MVP	NFL Most Valuable Player Award
OPY	NFL Offensive Player of the Year Award
OROY	NFL Rookie of the Year Award
PBMVP	Pro Bowl Most Valuable Player Award
ROY	UPI NFL-NFC Rookie of the Year
UPINFC	UPI NFC Player of the Year

== Seasons ==
NFL champions (1920–1969)^{†}	Super Bowl champions (1966–present)^{‡}	Conference champions (1967–present)°	Division champions (1967–present)*	Wild card berth (1970–present)^{§}

Franchise records according to Pro-Football Reference.com
Season	Team	League	Conference	Division	Regular season				Postseason results	Awards	Head coach
Season	Team	League	Conference	Division	Finish	W	L	T	Postseason results	Awards	Head coach
1961	1961	NFL	Western		7th	3	11	0			Norm Van Brocklin
1962	1962	NFL	Western		6th	2	11	1			Norm Van Brocklin
1963	1963	NFL	Western		T-4th	5	8	1		Paul Flatley (ROY)	Norm Van Brocklin
1964	1964	NFL	Western		T-2nd	8	5	1		Fran Tarkenton (PBMVP)	Norm Van Brocklin
1965	1965	NFL	Western		5th	7	7	0			Norm Van Brocklin
1966	1966	NFL	Western		T-6th	4	9	1			Norm Van Brocklin
1967	1967	NFL	Western	Central	4th	3	8	3			Bud Grant
1968	1968	NFL	Western	Central*	1st*	8	6	0	Lost Conference Playoffs (at Colts) 14–24		Bud Grant
1969	1969	NFL^{†}	Western°	Central*	1st*	12	2	0	Won Conference Playoffs (Rams) 23–20; Won NFL Championship (Browns) 27–7^{†} Lost Super Bowl IV (vs. Chiefs) 7–23	Bud Grant (COY)	Bud Grant
1970	1970	NFL	NFC	Central*	1st*	12	2	0	Lost Divisional Playoffs (49ers) 14–17		Bud Grant
1971	1971	NFL	NFC	Central*	1st*	11	3	0	Lost Divisional Playoffs (Cowboys) 12–20	Carl Eller (GH); Alan Page (MVP, DPY, UPINFC)	Bud Grant
1972	1972	NFL	NFC	Central	3rd	7	7	0			Bud Grant
1973	1973	NFL	NFC°	Central*	1st*	12	2	0	Won Divisional Playoffs (Redskins) 27–20; Won Conference Championship (at Cowboys) 27–10; Lost Super Bowl VIII (vs. Dolphins) 7–24	Chuck Foreman (OROY); Alan Page (GH); Jim Finks (EOY)	Bud Grant
1974	1974	NFL	NFC°	Central*	1st*	10	4	0	Won Divisional Playoffs (Cardinals) 30–14; Won Conference Championship (Rams) 14–10; Lost Super Bowl IX (vs. Steelers) 6–16		Bud Grant
1975	1975	NFL	NFC	Central*	1st*	12	2	0	Lost Divisional Playoffs^{[a]} (Cowboys) 14–17	Fran Tarkenton (MVP, BBA, UPINFC, OPY)	Bud Grant
1976	1976	NFL	NFC°	Central*	1st*	11	2	1	Won Divisional Playoffs (Redskins) 35–20; Won Conference Championship (Rams) 24–13; Lost Super Bowl XI (vs. Raiders) 14–32	Chuck Foreman (UPINFC); Sammy White (ROY, OROY)	Bud Grant
1977	1977	NFL	NFC	Central*	1st*	9	5	0	Won Divisional Playoffs (at Rams) 14–7; Lost Conference Championship (at Cowboys) 6–23		Bud Grant
1978^{[b]}	1978	NFL	NFC	Central*	1st*	8	7	1	Lost Divisional Playoffs (at Rams) 10–34	Ahmad Rashad (PBMVP)	Bud Grant
1979	1979	NFL	NFC	Central	3rd	7	9	0			Bud Grant
1980	1980	NFL	NFC	Central*	1st*	9	7	0	Lost Divisional Playoffs (at Eagles) 16–31		Bud Grant
1981	1981	NFL	NFC	Central	4th	7	9	0			Bud Grant
1982^{[c]}	1982	NFL	NFC		4th	5	4	0	Won First round (Falcons) 30–24; Lost Second round (at Redskins) 7–21		Bud Grant
1983	1983	NFL	NFC	Central	4th	8	8	0			Bud Grant
1984	1984	NFL	NFC	Central	5th	3	13	0			Les Steckel
1985	1985	NFL	NFC	Central	3rd	7	9	0			Bud Grant
1986	1986	NFL	NFC	Central	2nd	9	7	0		Tommy Kramer (CPY)	Jerry Burns
1987^{[d]}	1987	NFL	NFC	Central	2nd^{§}	8	7	0	Won Wild Card Playoffs (at Saints) 44–10; Won Divisional Playoffs (at 49ers) 36–24; Lost Conference Championship (at Redskins) 10–17		Jerry Burns
1988	1988	NFL	NFC	Central	2nd^{§}	11	5	0	Won Wild Card Playoffs (Rams) 28–17; Lost Divisional Playoffs (at 49ers) 9–34		Jerry Burns
1989	1989	NFL	NFC	Central*	1st*	10	6	0	Lost Divisional Playoffs (at 49ers) 13–41	Keith Millard (DPY, UPINFC)	Jerry Burns
1990	1990	NFL	NFC	Central	5th	6	10	0			Jerry Burns
1991	1991	NFL	NFC	Central	3rd	8	8	0			Jerry Burns
1992	1992	NFL	NFC	Central*	1st*	11	5	0	Lost Wild Card Playoffs (Redskins) 7–24	Chris Doleman (UPINFC); Dennis Green (COY)	Dennis Green
1993	1993	NFL	NFC	Central	2nd^{§}	9	7	0	Lost Wild Card Playoffs (at Giants) 10–17		Dennis Green
1994	1994	NFL	NFC	Central*	1st*	10	6	0	Lost Wild Card Playoffs (Bears) 18–35		Dennis Green
1995	1995	NFL	NFC	Central	4th	8	8	0			Dennis Green
1996	1996	NFL	NFC	Central	2nd^{§}	9	7	0	Lost Wild Card Playoffs (at Cowboys) 15–40		Dennis Green
1997	1997	NFL	NFC	Central	4th^{§}	9	7	0	Won Wild Card Playoffs (at Giants) 23–22; Lost Divisional Playoffs (at 49ers) 22–38		Dennis Green
1998	1998	NFL	NFC	Central*	1st*	15	1	0	Won Divisional Playoffs (Cardinals) 41–21; Lost Conference Championship (Falcons) 27–30 (OT)	Randall Cunningham (BBA); Dennis Green (COY); Randy Moss (OROY)	Dennis Green
1999	1999	NFL	NFC	Central	2nd^{§}	10	6	0	Won Wild Card Playoffs (Cowboys) 27–10; Lost Divisional Playoffs (at Rams) 37–49	Cris Carter (MOY); Randy Moss (PBMVP)	Dennis Green
2000	2000	NFL	NFC	Central*	1st*	11	5	0	Won Divisional Playoffs (Saints) 34–16; Lost Conference Championship (at Giants) 0–41		Dennis Green
2001	2001	NFL	NFC	Central	4th	5	11	0			Dennis Green (5–10) Mike Tice (0–1)
2002	2002	NFL	NFC	North	2nd	6	10	0			Mike Tice
2003	2003	NFL	NFC	North	2nd	9	7	0			Mike Tice
2004	2004	NFL	NFC	North	2nd^{§}	8	8	0	Won Wild Card Playoffs (at Packers) 31–17; Lost Divisional Playoffs (at Eagles) 14–27		Mike Tice
2005	2005	NFL	NFC	North	2nd	9	7	0			Mike Tice
2006	2006	NFL	NFC	North	3rd	6	10	0			Brad Childress
2007	2007	NFL	NFC	North	2nd	8	8	0		Adrian Peterson (OROY, PBMVP)	Brad Childress
2008	2008	NFL	NFC	North*	1st*	10	6	0	Lost Wild Card Playoffs (Eagles) 14–26	Adrian Peterson (BBA)	Brad Childress
2009	2009	NFL	NFC	North*	1st*	12	4	0	Won Divisional Playoffs (Cowboys) 34–3; Lost Conference Championship (at Saints) 28–31 (OT)	Percy Harvin (OROY)	Brad Childress
2010	2010	NFL	NFC	North	4th	6	10	0		Madieu Williams (MOY)	Brad Childress (3–7) Leslie Frazier (3–3)
2011	2011	NFL	NFC	North	4th	3	13	0			Leslie Frazier
2012	2012	NFL	NFC	North	2nd^{§}	10	6	0	Lost Wild Card Playoffs (at Packers) 10–24	Kyle Rudolph (PBMVP); Adrian Peterson (BBA, MVP, OPY)	Leslie Frazier
2013	2013	NFL	NFC	North	4th	5	10	1			Leslie Frazier
2014	2014	NFL	NFC	North	3rd	7	9	0			Mike Zimmer
2015	2015	NFL	NFC	North*	1st*	11	5	0	Lost Wild Card Playoffs (Seahawks) 9–10		Mike Zimmer
2016	2016	NFL	NFC	North	3rd	8	8	0			Mike Zimmer
2017	2017	NFL	NFC	North*	1st*	13	3	0	Won Divisional Playoffs (Saints) 29–24; Lost Conference Championship (at Eagles) 7–38		Mike Zimmer
2018	2018	NFL	NFC	North	2nd	8	7	1			Mike Zimmer
2019	2019	NFL	NFC	North	2nd^{§}	10	6	0	Won Wild Card Playoffs (at Saints) 26–20 (OT); Lost Divisional Playoffs (at 49ers) 10–27		Mike Zimmer
2020	2020	NFL	NFC	North	3rd	7	9	0			Mike Zimmer
2021	2021	NFL	NFC	North	2nd	8	9	0			Mike Zimmer
2022	2022	NFL	NFC	North*	1st*	13	4	0	Lost Wild Card Playoffs (Giants) 24–31	Justin Jefferson (OPY)	Kevin O'Connell
2023	2023	NFL	NFC	North	3rd	7	10	0			Kevin O'Connell
2024	2024	NFL	NFC	North	2nd^{§}	14	3	0	Lost Wild Card Playoffs (at Rams) 9–27	Kevin O'Connell (COY)	Kevin O'Connell
2025	2025	NFL	NFC	North	3rd	9	8	0			Kevin O'Connell
Total^{[f]}						546	446	11	Regular season record through 2025		
Total^{[f]}						21	32	0	Playoff record through 2025		
Total^{[f]}						567	478	11	Regular season and playoff record through 2025		

== Footnotes ==
- ^{a} The Vikings were defeated on a desperation touchdown pass thrown by Cowboys quarterback Roger Staubach with less than a minute left in the game. Staubach coined the phrase "Hail Mary pass", referring to his toss, and the game itself became known as "The Hail Mary".
- ^{b} The NFL expanded from a 14-game regular season schedule to 16 beginning in 1978.
- ^{c} The 1982 NFL season was shortened from 16 regular season games to 9 due to a players' strike. For playoff seedings, division standings were ignored and the league used a 16-team tournament format for the season.
- ^{d} The 1987 NFL season was shortened from 16 regular season games to 15 due to a players' strike.
- ^{f} The "finish", "wins", "losses", and "ties" columns list regular season results and exclude any postseason play. Regular and postseason records are combined only at the bottom of the list.
