= List of Miami Dolphins seasons =

This is a list of seasons completed by the National Football League (NFL)'s Miami Dolphins, an American football franchise based in the Miami metropolitan area. The list documents the season-by-season records of the Dolphins franchise from 1966 to present, including postseason records, and league awards for individual players or head coaches.

Although the Miami Dolphins were not successful before joining the NFL, from 1970 when they played their first season after the AFL–NFL merger until 2001 they were one of the most successful teams in the league, playing in the postseason on 22 occasions over those 32 years, winning 335 and tying two of 527 games for an overall win percentage of 63.75, and suffering a mere two losing seasons out of 32. Early in this period the Dolphins won their only two Super Bowls in consecutive seasons (becoming the second team to do so in the Super Bowl era), in the process achieving the only modern-day perfect season in any major professional sports league during only their third year in the NFL. Much of this success was orchestrated by coach Don Shula who joined the team in 1970 and stayed with them until his retirement in 1995.

After Shula retired in 1995, the Dolphins remained a force for six years under successors Jimmy Johnson and Dave Wannstedt, but since 2002 and especially since 2004 have fallen on harder times, reaching the postseason only twice in the eighteen seasons since, and during the mid-2000s, briefly intensifying the Dolphins–Patriots rivalry, when Nick Saban, a former Bill Belichick assistant, was hired as the Dolphins head coach in 2005; Saban spent two seasons as the head coach of the Dolphins before leaving for Alabama. In 2007, they narrowly avoided an imperfect season by beating the Baltimore Ravens for their first and only win of the year. The next year, the Dolphins became the first team in NFL history to win their division following a 1–15 season; until 2020, it was the last time when the AFC East was not won by the New England Patriots. Since 2000 (the last season they won a playoff game), the Dolphins have made the postseason five times, but never progressed past the Wild Card round.

For complete team history, see History of the Miami Dolphins.

== Seasons ==
Key
Super Bowl champions *	Conference champions #	Division champions †	Wild Card berth ^

Miami Dolphins seasonal records
Season	Team	League	Conference	Division	Regular season				Postseason results	Awards	Head coach	Refs.
Season	Team	League	Conference	Division	Finish	W	L	T	Postseason results	Awards	Head coach	Refs.
1966	1966	AFL		Eastern	5th	3	11	0			George Wilson	
1967	1967	AFL		Eastern	4th	4	10	0			George Wilson	
1968	1968	AFL		Eastern	3rd	5	8	1			George Wilson	
1969	1969	AFL		Eastern	5th	3	10	1			George Wilson	
1970	1970	NFL	AFC	East	2nd ^	10	4	0	Lost Divisional Playoffs (at Raiders) 14–21		Don Shula	
1971	1971	NFL	AFC #	East	1st†	10	3	1	Won Divisional Playoffs (at Chiefs) 27–24 (2 OT); Won AFC Championship (Colts) 21–0; Lost Super Bowl VI (vs. Cowboys) 3–24		Don Shula	
1972	1972	NFL *	AFC #	East	1st†	14	0	0	Won Divisional Playoffs (Browns) 20–14; Won AFC Championship (at Steelers) 21–17; Won Super Bowl VII (1) (vs. Redskins) 14–7	Don Shula (COY); Jake Scott (SB MVP); Earl Morrall (CBPOY)	Don Shula	
1973	1973	NFL *	AFC #	East	1st†	12	2	0	Won Divisional Playoffs (Bengals) 34–16; Won AFC Championship (Raiders) 27–10; Won Super Bowl VIII (2) (vs. Vikings) 24–7	Dick Anderson (DPOY); Larry Csonka (SB MVP); Garo Yepremian (PB MVP)	Don Shula	
1974	1974	NFL	AFC	East	1st†	11	3	0	Lost Divisional Playoffs (at Raiders) 26–28		Don Shula	
1975	1975	NFL	AFC	East	2nd	10	4	0			Don Shula	
1976	1976	NFL	AFC	East	3rd	6	8	0			Don Shula	
1977	1977	NFL	AFC	East	2nd	10	4	0		Bob Griese (Bell Awd); A. J. Duhe (DROY)	Don Shula	
1978	1978	NFL	AFC	East	2nd ^	11	5	0	Lost Wild Card Playoffs (Oilers) 9–17		Don Shula	
1979	1979	NFL	AFC	East	1st†	10	6	0	Lost Divisional Playoffs (at Steelers) 14–34	Larry Csonka (CBPOY)	Don Shula	
1980	1980	NFL	AFC	East	3rd	8	8	0			Don Shula	
1981	1981	NFL	AFC	East	1st†	11	4	1	Lost Divisional Playoffs (Chargers) 38–41 (OT)		Don Shula	
1982	1982	NFL	AFC #		2nd^{1} ^	7	2	0	Won First Round Playoffs (Patriots) 28–13; Won Second Round Playoffs (Chargers) 34–13; Won AFC Championship (Jets) 14–0; Lost Super Bowl XVII (vs. Redskins) 17–27		Don Shula	
1983	1983	NFL	AFC	East	1st†	12	4	0	Lost Divisional Playoffs (Seahawks) 20–27	Doug Betters (DPOY)	Don Shula	
1984	1984	NFL	AFC #	East	1st†	14	2	0	Won Divisional Playoffs (Seahawks) 31–10; Won AFC Championship (Steelers) 45–28; Lost Super Bowl XIX (vs. 49ers) 16–38	Dan Marino (MVP, OPOY, Bell Awd)	Don Shula	
1985	1985	NFL	AFC	East	1st†	12	4	0	Won Divisional Playoffs (Browns) 24–21; Lost AFC Championship (Patriots) 14–31	Dwight Stephenson (WPMOY)	Don Shula	
1986	1986	NFL	AFC	East	3rd	8	8	0			Don Shula	
1987	1987	NFL	AFC	East	3rd	8	7	0		Troy Stradford (OROY)	Don Shula	
1988	1988	NFL	AFC	East	5th	6	10	0			Don Shula	
1989	1989	NFL	AFC	East	3rd	8	8	0			Don Shula	
1990	1990	NFL	AFC	East	2nd ^	12	4	0	Won Wild Card Playoffs (Chiefs) 17–16; Lost Divisional Playoffs (at Bills) 34–44		Don Shula	
1991	1991	NFL	AFC	East	3rd	8	8	0			Don Shula	
1992	1992	NFL	AFC	East	1st†	11	5	0	Won Divisional Playoffs (Chargers) 31–0; Lost AFC Championship (Bills) 10–29		Don Shula	
1993	1993	NFL	AFC	East	2nd	9	7	0			Don Shula	
1994	1994	NFL	AFC	East	1st†	10	6	0	Won Wild Card Playoffs (Chiefs) 27–17; Lost Divisional Playoffs (at Chargers) 21–22	Tim Bowens (DROY); Dan Marino (CBPOY)	Don Shula	
1995	1995	NFL	AFC	East	3rd ^	9	7	0	Lost Wild Card Playoffs (at Bills) 22–37		Don Shula	
1996	1996	NFL	AFC	East	4th	8	8	0			Jimmy Johnson	
1997	1997	NFL	AFC	East	2nd ^	9	7	0	Lost Wild Card Playoffs (at Patriots) 3–17		Jimmy Johnson	
1998	1998	NFL	AFC	East	2nd ^	10	6	0	Won Wild Card Playoffs (Bills) 24–17; Lost Divisional Playoffs (at Broncos) 3–38	Dan Marino (WPMOY)	Jimmy Johnson	
1999	1999	NFL	AFC	East	3rd ^	9	7	0	Won Wild Card Playoffs (at Seahawks) 20–17; Lost Divisional Playoffs (at Jaguars) 7–62		Jimmy Johnson	
2000	2000	NFL	AFC	East	1st†	11	5	0	Won Wild Card Playoffs (Colts) 23–17 (OT); Lost Divisional Playoffs (at Raiders) 0–27		Dave Wannstedt	
2001	2001	NFL	AFC	East	2nd ^	11	5	0	Lost Wild Card Playoffs (Ravens) 3–20		Dave Wannstedt	
2002	2002	NFL	AFC	East	3rd	9	7	0		Ricky Williams (PB MVP)	Dave Wannstedt	
2003	2003	NFL	AFC	East	2nd	10	6	0			Dave Wannstedt	
2004	2004	NFL	AFC	East	4th	4	12	0			Dave Wannstedt (1–8) Jim Bates (3–4)	
2005	2005	NFL	AFC	East	2nd	9	7	0			Nick Saban	
2006	2006	NFL	AFC	East	4th	6	10	0		Jason Taylor (DPOY)	Nick Saban	
2007	2007	NFL	AFC	East	4th	1	15	0		Jason Taylor (WPMOY)	Cam Cameron	
2008	2008	NFL	AFC	East	1st†	11	5	0	Lost Wild Card Playoffs (Ravens) 9–27	Chad Pennington (CBPOY)	Tony Sparano	
2009	2009	NFL	AFC	East	3rd	7	9	0			Tony Sparano	
2010	2010	NFL	AFC	East	3rd	7	9	0			Tony Sparano	
2011	2011	NFL	AFC	East	3rd	6	10	0		Brandon Marshall (PB MVP)	Tony Sparano (4–9) Todd Bowles (2–1)	
2012	2012	NFL	AFC	East	2nd	7	9	0			Joe Philbin	
2013	2013	NFL	AFC	East	3rd	8	8	0			Joe Philbin	
2014	2014	NFL	AFC	East	3rd	8	8	0			Joe Philbin	
2015	2015	NFL	AFC	East	4th	6	10	0			Joe Philbin (1–3) Dan Campbell (5–7)	
2016	2016	NFL	AFC	East	2nd ^	10	6	0	Lost Wild Card Playoffs (at Steelers) 12–30		Adam Gase	
2017	2017	NFL	AFC	East	3rd	6	10	0			Adam Gase	
2018	2018	NFL	AFC	East	2nd	7	9	0			Adam Gase	
2019	2019	NFL	AFC	East	4th	5	11	0			Brian Flores	
2020	2020	NFL	AFC	East	2nd	10	6	0			Brian Flores	
2021	2021	NFL	AFC	East	3rd	9	8	0			Brian Flores	
2022	2022	NFL	AFC	East	2nd ^	9	8	0	Lost Wild Card Playoffs (at Bills) 31–34		Mike McDaniel	
2023	2023	NFL	AFC	East	2nd ^	11	6	0	Lost Wild Card Playoffs (at Chiefs) 7–26		Mike McDaniel	
2024	2024	NFL	AFC	East	2nd	8	9	0			Mike McDaniel	
2025	2025	NFL	AFC	East	3rd	7	10	0			Mike McDaniel	
						511	418	4	Regular season			
						20	23	—	Postseason			
						531	441	4	Total			

Note: Records current through the end of the 2025 NFL season

^{1} Due to a strike-shortened season in 1982, teams were ranked by conference instead of division
