= Bert Bell Memorial Trophy =

Bert Bell Memorial Trophy may refer to:

- Bert Bell Award, awarded to the player of the year in the National Football League
- NEA NFL Rookie of the Year
