= List of Las Vegas Raiders seasons =

This is a list of seasons completed by the Las Vegas Raiders American football franchise of the National Football League (NFL). The list documents the season-by-season records of the Raiders' franchise from 1960 to present, including postseason records, and league awards for individual players or head coaches. The team originated in Oakland, California as the Oakland Raiders, where they first played 22 seasons from 1960 to 1981. From 1982 to 1994, the team played 13 seasons in Los Angeles as the Los Angeles Raiders, before returning to Oakland in 1995. The team played 25 seasons in its second stint in Oakland from 1995 to 2019. In 2017, the Raiders officially announced their relocation from Oakland to the Las Vegas metropolitan area. In 2020, the Raiders began play as the Las Vegas Raiders at the newly constructed Allegiant Stadium.

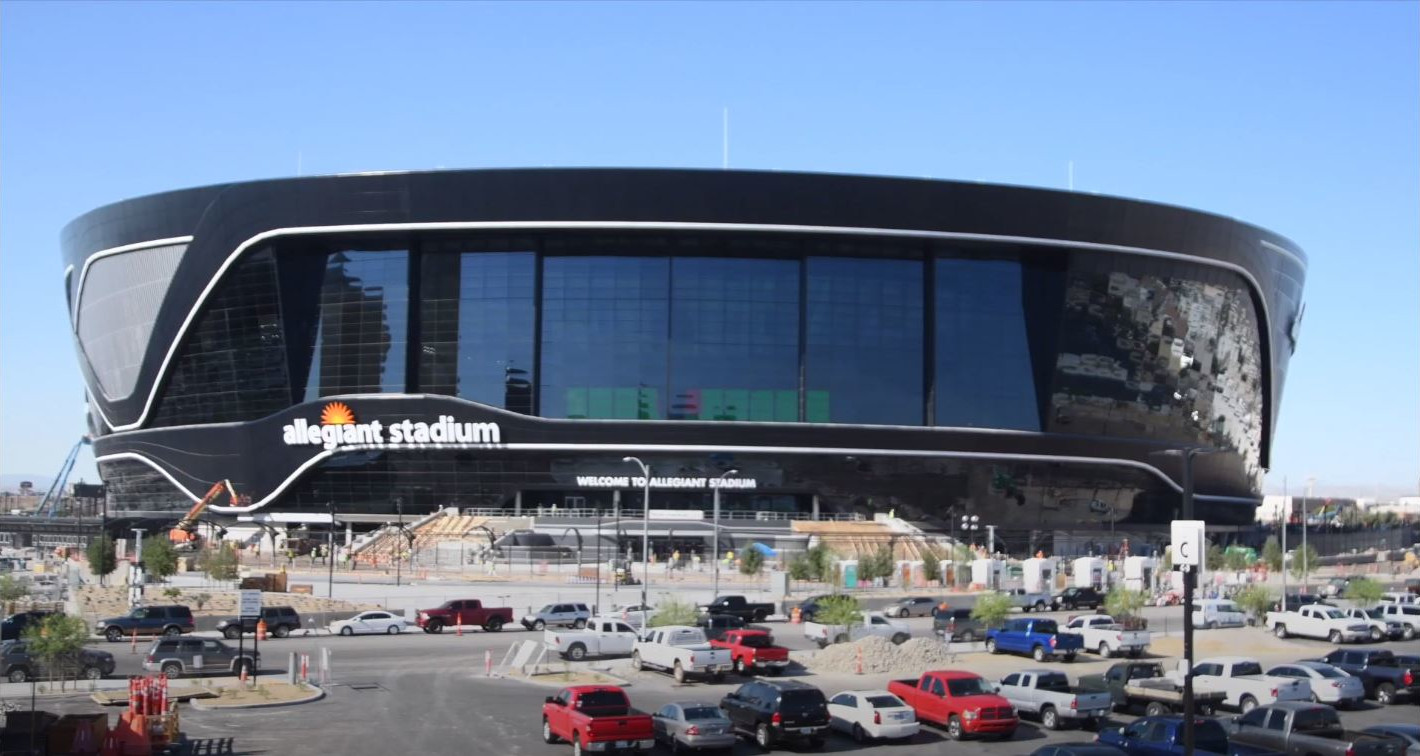
The Raiders have played at Allegiant Stadium since 2020.

From 1960 to 2023, the franchise has played a total of 64 seasons. The Raiders have won one AFL championship and three Super Bowl titles. The team won the AFL Championship in 1967 prior to the 1970 AFL–NFL merger and lost their first Super Bowl appearance in Super Bowl II. The franchise would go on to win their next three Super Bowl appearances in Super Bowl XI, Super Bowl XV, and Super Bowl XVIII. Only six teams have appeared in more Super Bowls than the Raiders: the New England Patriots (12), Dallas Cowboys (eight), Pittsburgh Steelers (eight), Denver Broncos (eight), San Francisco 49ers (eight), and Kansas City Chiefs (seven); the Raiders’ five appearances are tied with the Green Bay Packers, Los Angeles Rams, Miami Dolphins, New York Giants, and the Washington Commanders.

== Seasons ==
AFL champions (1960–1969)^{§}	Super Bowl champions (1966–present)^{†}	Conference champions^{*}	Division champions^{+}	Wild Card berth^{#}

Las Vegas Raiders seasonal records
Season	Team	League	Conference	Division	Regular season				Postseason results	Awards	Head coaches	Refs.
Season	Team	League	Conference	Division	Finish	W	L	T	Postseason results	Awards	Head coaches	Refs.
Oakland Raiders
1960	1960	AFL		Western	3rd	6	8	0			Eddie Erdelatz	
1961	1961	AFL		Western	4th	2	12	0			Eddie Erdelatz (0–2) Marty Feldman (2–10)	
1962	1962	AFL		Western	4th	1	13	0			Marty Feldman (0–5) Red Conkright (1–8)	
1963	1963	AFL		Western	2nd	10	4	0			Al Davis	
1964	1964	AFL		Western	3rd	5	7	2			Al Davis	
1965	1965	AFL		Western	2nd	8	5	1			Al Davis	
1966	1966	AFL		Western	2nd	8	5	1			John Rauch	
1967	1967	AFL^{§}		Western^{^}	1st^{^}	13	1	0	Won AFL Championship (Oilers) 40–7; Lost Super Bowl II (vs. Packers) 14–33	Daryle Lamonica (MVP)	John Rauch	
1968	1968	AFL		Western^{^}	1st^{^}	12	2	0	Won Divisional playoff (Chiefs) 41–6; Lost AFL Championship (at Jets) 23–27		John Rauch	
1969	1969	AFL		Western^{^}	1st^{^}	12	1	1	Won Divisional playoffs (Oilers) 56–7; Lost AFL Championship (Chiefs) 7–17	Daryle Lamonica (MVP)	John Madden	
1970	1970	NFL	AFC	West^{^}	1st^{^}	8	4	2	Won Divisional playoffs (Dolphins) 21–14; Lost AFC Championship (at Colts) 17–27		John Madden	
1971	1971	NFL	AFC	West	2nd	8	4	2			John Madden	
1972	1972	NFL	AFC	West^{^}	1st^{^}	10	3	1	Lost Divisional playoffs (at Steelers) 7–13		John Madden	
1973	1973	NFL	AFC	West^{^}	1st^{^}	9	4	1	Won Divisional playoffs (Steelers) 33–14; Lost AFC Championship (at Dolphins) 10–27		John Madden	
1974	1974	NFL	AFC	West^{^}	1st^{^}	12	2	0	Won Divisional playoffs (Dolphins) 28–26; Lost AFC Championship (Steelers) 13–24	Ken Stabler (MVP, OPOY)	John Madden	
1975	1975	NFL	AFC	West^{^}	1st^{^}	11	3	0	Won Divisional playoffs (Bengals) 31–28; Lost AFC Championship (at Steelers) 10–16		John Madden	
1976	1976	NFL^{†}	AFC^{*}	West^{^}	1st^{^}	13	1	0	Won Divisional playoffs (Patriots) 24–21; Won AFC Championship (Steelers) 24–7; Won Super Bowl XI (1) (vs. Vikings) 32–14	Fred Biletnikoff (SB MVP); Al Davis (EOY)	John Madden	
1977	1977	NFL	AFC	West	2nd^{#}	11	3	0	Won Divisional playoffs (at Colts) 37–31 (2 OT); Lost AFC Championship (at Broncos) 17–20		John Madden	
1978	1978	NFL	AFC	West	2nd	9	7	0			John Madden	
1979	1979	NFL	AFC	West	4th	9	7	0			Tom Flores	
1980	1980	NFL^{†}	AFC^{*}	West	2nd^{#}	11	5	0	Won Wild Card playoffs (Oilers) 27–7; Won Divisional playoffs (at Browns) 14–12; Won AFC Championship (at Chargers) 34–27; Won Super Bowl XV (2) (vs. Eagles) 27–10	Lester Hayes (DPOY); Jim Plunkett (CBPOY, SB MVP)	Tom Flores	
1981	1981	NFL	AFC	West	4th	7	9	0			Tom Flores	
Los Angeles Raiders
1982	1982	NFL	AFC	—	1st	8	1	0	Won First Round playoffs (Browns) 27–10; Lost Second Round playoffs (Jets) 14–17	Marcus Allen (OROY); Lyle Alzado (CBPOY)	Tom Flores	
1983	1983	NFL^{†}	AFC^{*}	West^{^}	1st^{^}	12	4	0	Won Divisional playoffs (Steelers) 38–10; Won AFC Championship (Seahawks) 30–14; Won Super Bowl XVIII (3) (vs. Redskins) 38–9	Marcus Allen (SB MVP)	Tom Flores	
1984	1984	NFL	AFC	West	3rd^{#}	11	5	0	Lost Wild Card playoffs (at Seahawks) 7–13		Tom Flores	
1985	1985	NFL	AFC	West^{^}	1st^{^}	12	4	0	Lost Divisional playoffs (Patriots) 20–27	Marcus Allen (MVP, OPOY)	Tom Flores	
1986	1986	NFL	AFC	West	4th	8	8	0			Tom Flores	
1987	1987	NFL	AFC	West	4th	5	10	0			Tom Flores	
1988	1988	NFL	AFC	West	3rd	7	9	0			Mike Shanahan	
1989	1989	NFL	AFC	West	3rd	8	8	0			Mike Shanahan (1–3) Art Shell (7–5)	
1990	1990	NFL	AFC	West^{^}	1st^{^}	12	4	0	Won Divisional playoffs (Bengals) 20–10; Lost AFC Championship (at Bills) 3–51		Art Shell	
1991	1991	NFL	AFC	West	3rd^{#}	9	7	0	Lost Wild Card playoffs (at Chiefs) 6–10		Art Shell	
1992	1992	NFL	AFC	West	4th	7	9	0			Art Shell	
1993	1993	NFL	AFC	West	2nd^{#}	10	6	0	Won Wild Card playoffs (Broncos) 42–24; Lost Divisional playoffs (at Bills) 23–29		Art Shell	
1994	1994	NFL	AFC	West	3rd	9	7	0			Art Shell	
Oakland Raiders
1995	1995	NFL	AFC	West	5th	8	8	0			Mike White	
1996	1996	NFL	AFC	West	4th	7	9	0			Mike White	
1997	1997	NFL	AFC	West	4th	4	12	0			Joe Bugel	
1998	1998	NFL	AFC	West	2nd	8	8	0		Charles Woodson (DROY)	Jon Gruden	
1999	1999	NFL	AFC	West	3rd	8	8	0			Jon Gruden	
2000	2000	NFL	AFC	West^{^}	1st^{^}	12	4	0	Won Divisional playoffs (Dolphins) 27–0; Lost AFC Championship (Ravens) 3–16		Jon Gruden	
2001	2001	NFL	AFC	West^{^}	1st^{^}	10	6	0	Won Wild Card playoffs (Jets) 38–24; Lost Divisional playoffs (at Patriots) 13–16 (OT)		Jon Gruden	
2002	2002	NFL	AFC^{*}	West^{^}	1st^{^}	11	5	0	Won Divisional playoffs (Jets) 30–10; Won AFC Championship (Titans) 41–24; Lost Super Bowl XXXVII (vs. Buccaneers) 21–48	Rich Gannon (MVP); Bruce Allen (EOY)	Bill Callahan	
2003	2003	NFL	AFC	West	3rd	4	12	0			Bill Callahan	
2004	2004	NFL	AFC	West	4th	5	11	0			Norv Turner	
2005	2005	NFL	AFC	West	4th	4	12	0			Norv Turner	
2006	2006	NFL	AFC	West	4th	2	14	0			Art Shell	
2007	2007	NFL	AFC	West	4th	4	12	0			Lane Kiffin	
2008	2008	NFL	AFC	West	3rd	5	11	0			Lane Kiffin (1–3) Tom Cable (4–8)	
2009	2009	NFL	AFC	West	3rd	5	11	0			Tom Cable	
2010	2010	NFL	AFC	West	3rd	8	8	0			Tom Cable	
2011	2011	NFL	AFC	West	3rd	8	8	0			Hue Jackson	
2012	2012	NFL	AFC	West	3rd	4	12	0			Dennis Allen	
2013	2013	NFL	AFC	West	4th	4	12	0			Dennis Allen	
2014	2014	NFL	AFC	West	4th	3	13	0			Dennis Allen (0–4) Tony Sparano (3–9)	
2015	2015	NFL	AFC	West	3rd	7	9	0			Jack Del Rio	
2016	2016	NFL	AFC	West	2nd^{#}	12	4	0	Lost Wild Card playoffs (at Texans) 14–27	Khalil Mack (DPOY)	Jack Del Rio	
2017	2017	NFL	AFC	West	3rd	6	10	0			Jack Del Rio	
2018	2018	NFL	AFC	West	4th	4	12	0			Jon Gruden	
2019	2019	NFL	AFC	West	3rd	7	9	0			Jon Gruden	
Las Vegas Raiders
2020	2020	NFL	AFC	West	2nd	8	8	0			Jon Gruden	
2021	2021	NFL	AFC	West	2nd^{#}	10	7	0	Lost Wild Card playoffs (at Bengals) 19–26		Jon Gruden (3–2) Rich Bisaccia (7–5)	
2022	2022	NFL	AFC	West	3rd	6	11	0			Josh McDaniels	
2023	2023	NFL	AFC	West	2nd	8	9	0			Josh McDaniels (3–5) Antonio Pierce (5–4)	
2024	2024	NFL	AFC	West	4th	4	13	0			Antonio Pierce	
2025	2025	NFL	AFC	West	4th	3	14	0			Pete Carroll	
Total						512	494	11	(1960–2025, includes only regular season)			
Total						25	20	—	(1960–2025, includes only playoffs)			
Total						537	514	11	(1960–2025, includes both regular season and playoffs; 3 NFL Championships and 1 AFL Championship)			

^{1} Due to a strike-shortened season in 1982, all teams were ranked by conference instead of division.
