= UPI AFL-AFC Player of the Year =

American football award

From 1960 to 1969, the United Press International (UPI) gave the annual AFL Player of the Year award in the American Football League, whose teams in 1970 became the American Football Conference (AFC) of the new National Football League (NFL).

From 1970 — following the AFL–NFL merger — until 1996, UPI then gave two annual player of the year awards. One was given in the National Football Conference (NFC) of the new NFL. The other award was given in the American Football Conference (AFC) of the new NFL. An AFC Player of the Year was named from 1970 through 1984, won each year by an offensive player. An AFC Defensive Player of the Year was named from 1975 to 1996, and an AFC Offensive Player of the Year, which replaced the overall player of the year award in 1985, was issued until 1996.

== Winners ==
Season	Offense			Defense		
Season	Player	Team	Position	Player	Team	Position
1960	Abner Haynes	Dallas Texans	Halfback	-	-	-
1961	George Blanda (1)	Houston Oilers	Quarterback	-	-	-
1962	Cookie Gilchrist	Buffalo Bills	Fullback	-	-	-
1963	Lance Alworth	San Diego Chargers	Flanker	-	-	-
1964	Gino Cappelletti	Boston Patriots	Flanker, kicker	-	-	-
1965	Jack Kemp	Buffalo Bills	Quarterback	-	-	-
1966	Jim Nance	Boston Patriots	Fullback	-	-	-
1967	Daryle Lamonica (1)	Oakland Raiders	Quarterback	-	-	-
1968	Joe Namath	New York Jets	Quarterback	-	-	-
1969	Daryle Lamonica (2)	Oakland Raiders	Quarterback	-	-	-
1970	George Blanda (2)	Oakland Raiders	Quarterback, kicker	-	-	-
1971	Otis Taylor	Kansas City Chiefs	Wide receiver	-	-	-
1972	O. J. Simpson (1)	Buffalo Bills	Running back	-	-	-
1973	O. J. Simpson (2)	Buffalo Bills	Running back	-	-	-
1974	Ken Stabler	Oakland Raiders	Quarterback	-	-	-
1975	O. J. Simpson (3)	Buffalo Bills	Running back	Mel Blount	Pittsburgh Steelers	Cornerback
1976	Bert Jones	Baltimore Colts	Quarterback	Jack Lambert (1)	Pittsburgh Steelers	Linebacker
1977	Craig Morton	Denver Broncos	Quarterback	Lyle Alzado	Denver Broncos	Defensive end
1978	Earl Campbell	Houston Oilers	Running back	Randy Gradishar	Denver Broncos	Linebacker
1979	Dan Fouts (1)	San Diego Chargers	Quarterback	Jack Lambert (2)	Pittsburgh Steelers	Linbebacker
1980	Brian Sipe	Cleveland Browns	Quarterback	Lester Hayes	Oakland Raiders	Cornerback
1981	Ken Anderson	Cincinnati Bengals	Quarterback	Joe Klecko	New York Jets	Defensive end
1982	Dan Fouts (2)	San Diego Chargers	Quarterback	No award	-	-
1983	Curt Warner (1)	Seattle Seahawks	Running back	Rod Martin	Los Angeles Raiders	Linebacker
1984	Dan Marino (1)	Miami Dolphins	Quarterback	Mark Gastineau	New York Jets	Defensive end
1985	Marcus Allen	Los Angeles Raiders	Running back	Andre Tippett	New England Patriots	Linebacker
1986	Curt Warner (2)	Seattle Seahawks	Running back	Rulon Jones	Denver Broncos	Defensive end
1987	John Elway (1)	Denver Broncos	Quarterback	Bruce Smith (1)	Buffalo Bills	Defensive end
1988	Boomer Esiason	Cincinnati Bengals	Quarterback	Bruce Smith (2) (tie); Cornelius Bennett (1) (tie)	Buffalo Bills	Defensive end Linebacker
1989	Christian Okoye	Kansas City Chiefs	Running back	Michael Dean Perry	Cleveland Browns	Nose tackle
1990	Warren Moon	Houston Oilers	Quarterback	Bruce Smith (3)	Buffalo Bills	Defensive end
1991	Thurman Thomas	Buffalo Bills	Running back	Cornelius Bennett (2)	Buffalo Bills	Linebacker
1992	Barry Foster	Pittsburgh Steelers	Running back	Junior Seau	San Diego Chargers	Linebacker
1993	John Elway (2)	Denver Broncos	Quarterback	Rod Woodson	Pittsburgh Steelers	Cornerback
1994	Dan Marino (2)	Miami Dolphins	Quarterback	Greg Lloyd	Pittsburgh Steelers	Linebacker
1995	Jim Harbaugh	Indianapolis Colts	Quarterback	Bryce Paup	Buffalo Bills	Linebacker
1996	Terrell Davis	Denver Broncos	Running back	Bruce Smith (4)	Buffalo Bills	Defensive end

== Multiple-time winners ==
Total awards won
Wins	Team
13	Buffalo Bills
7	Denver Broncos
7	Oakland / Los Angeles Raiders
6	Pittsburgh Steelers
4	Los Angeles / San Diego Chargers
3	Boston / New England Patriots
3	Cleveland Browns
3	Houston Oilers
3	Dallas Texans / Kansas City Chiefs
3	New York Jets
2	Baltimore / Indianapolis Colts
2	Cincinnati Bengals
2	Miami Dolphins
2	Seattle Seahawks

== See also ==
- UPI NFC Player of the Year
- United Press International NFL Most Valuable Player Award
- American Football League Most Valuable Player Award
- National Football League Most Valuable Player Award
- NFL Offensive Player of the Year Award
- NFL Defensive Player of the Year Award
