= List of Seattle Seahawks seasons =

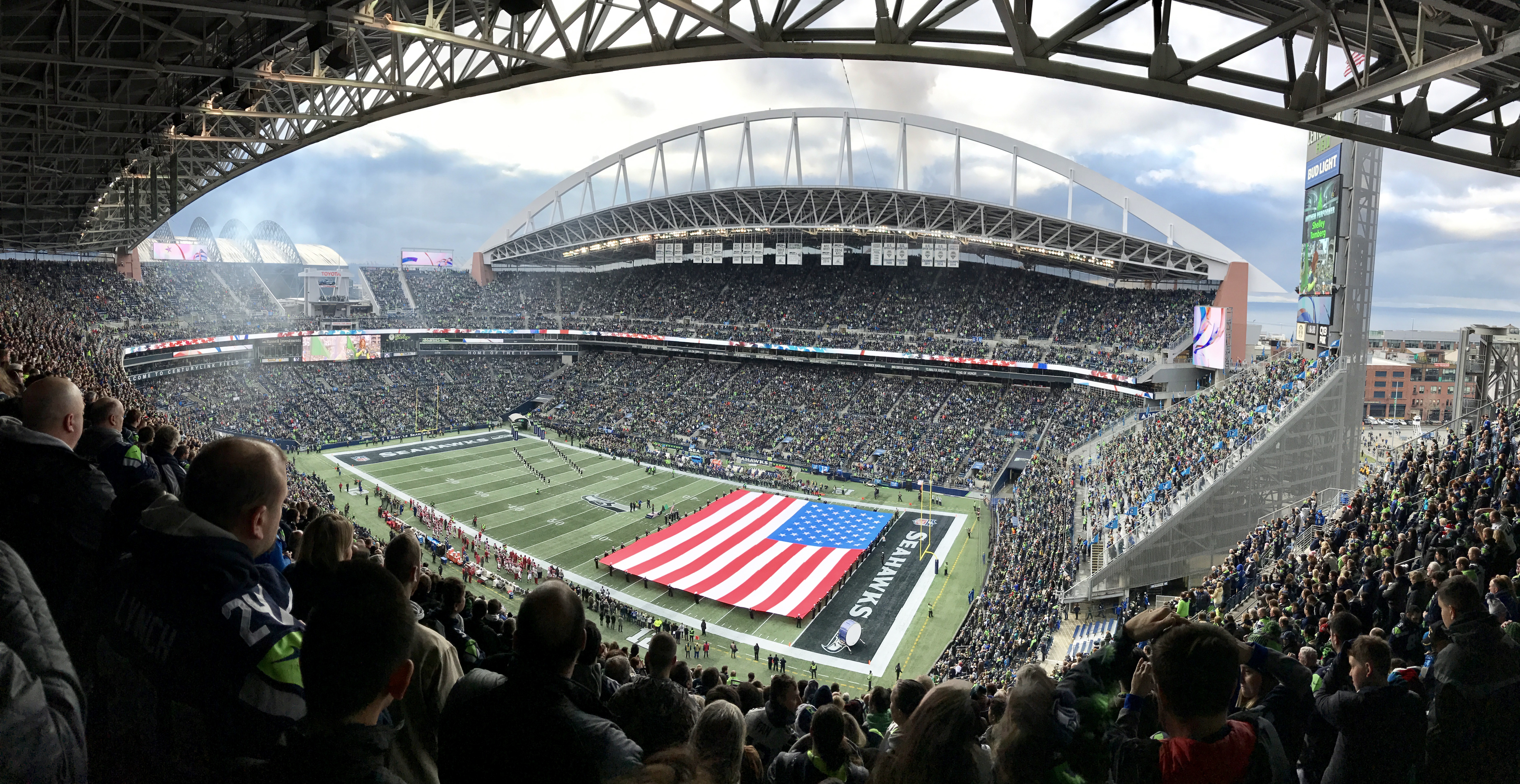
The Seattle Seahawks have played their home games at Lumen Field in Seattle since it opened in 2002

The Seattle Seahawks are a professional American football team based in Seattle, Washington, that play in the National Football League (NFL). The team entered the league in 1976 as an expansion franchise and played their home games at the Kingdome until 2000. Their new stadium, now named Lumen Field, opened at the same site in 2002 south of Downtown Seattle and has 68,740 seats in its football configuration; the stadium is renowned for its fan atmosphere and has set records for crowd noise. The Seahawks were originally a member of the National Football Conference (NFC) in their inaugural season, but switched to the American Football Conference (AFC) the following year and played in the West division for 25 seasons, where they won two titles. The team rejoined the NFC in the 2002 season as a member of the West division and have since had more success than their division rivals with ten titles and regular appearances in the NFL playoffs. The Seahawks have won four NFC Championships and two Super Bowl championships, in 2013 and 2025. They are the only team to have played in both the AFC and NFC Championship Games. The team's ownership group was led by the Nordstrom family from 1976 until 1988, when it was sold to real estate developer Ken Behring. His attempt to relocate the Seahawks to the Los Angeles area in 1996 was unsuccessful, as were early attempts to build a successor to the Kingdome. Behring sold the team in 1997 to Microsoft co-founder Paul Allen, who remained owner until his death in 2018; the Paul G. Allen Trust, managed by Jody Allen, has since retained ownership of the Seahawks.

Seattle and fellow 1976 expansion team Tampa Bay Buccaneers played an unusual non-division schedule for their first two seasons, which included switching conferences. In their first seven years under head coach Jack Patera, the Seahawks had two seasons with winning records and failed to make the playoffs, falling short by one game during the 1978 season as he was named NFL Coach of the Year. Patera was fired during the strike-shortened 1982 season and replaced on an interim basis by Mike McCormack for seven games. The Seahawks earned their first playoff berth as a wild card team in 1983 as Chuck Knox coached the team to a 9–7 record; the team earned an upset victory on the road against the Miami Dolphins and advanced to the AFC Championship, where they lost to the Los Angeles Raiders, a division rival. Knox coached the team through their most successful years in the AFC West as they qualified for the playoffs as wild cards in 1984 and 1987 and clinched their first division title in 1988. He resigned in 1991 after three consecutive seasons without a playoff berth and was replaced by team president and general manager Tom Flores, who was head coach from 1992 to 1994. Flores led the team to a 2–14 record in the 1992 season—the franchise's worst finish—with only 140 points scored by the offense, an NFL record low for a team playing 16 games. He was followed by Dennis Erickson, who coached the team for four seasons and failed to finish with a winning record and fell short of a playoff berth in 1998, shortly before he was fired.

Allen hired Green Bay Packers coach Mike Holmgren ahead of the 1999 season, which the Seahawks ended with an AFC West division title as they broke the longest active playoff drought in the league. The team lost in the Wild Card round to the Miami Dolphins in their final AFC playoffs game, after which Seattle would not clinch a playoff berth until they rejoined the NFC. The Seahawks earned their first NFC playoff berth in 2003 as a wild card team; it was then followed by four consecutive NFC West division titles. The run included their first Super Bowl appearance in 2005, where they lost to the Pittsburgh Steelers; the year also marked Seattle's first playoff wins since 1984. Running back Shaun Alexander was also named the NFL Most Valuable Player, the first in franchise history. Holmgren left at the end of his ten-season contract after the Seahawks failed to earn a playoff berth in the 2008 season and was replaced by Jim L. Mora, who finished with a 5–11 record and was fired after one season. Pete Carroll was hired in January 2010 and began his tenure with an NFC West division title despite a losing 7–9 record, a first in NFL history, and included consecutive Super Bowl appearances: a win against the Denver Broncos at Super Bowl XLVIII in 2013 and a loss to the New England Patriots at Super Bowl XLIX in 2014. The Seahawks won five division titles and made ten playoff appearances in fourteen seasons under Carroll from 2010 to 2023. Mike Macdonald became head coach in 2024 and led the team to their second Super Bowl championship the following year after a division title.

As of the end of the 2025 regular season, the Seahawks have an all-time record of 416 wins, 376 losses, and 1 tie in the regular season, with an additional 17 wins and 19 losses in the playoffs. The team has had 28 winning seasons, 18 losing seasons, and four seasons tied at 8–8. After decades of losing seasons, the Seahawks reached an overall .500 franchise record late in the 2015 season by winning their 625th regular season game. The Seahawks are one of three modern men's major league teams in the Seattle area to have an overall winning record, alongside the Seattle SuperSonics (who relocated in 2008) and Seattle Sounders FC, who moved to Major League Soccer in 2009. On October 23, 2016, the Seahawks played the Arizona Cardinals at University of Phoenix Stadium to a 6–6 result, the first tied game in franchise history.

== Seasons ==
Key to colors

‡	Super Bowl champions
†	Conference champions
Δ	Division champions
§	Wild Card berth

Key to awards

- COY – NFL Coach of the Year Award
- CPOY – NFL Comeback Player of the Year Award
- DPOY – NFL Defensive Player of the Year Award
- DROY – NFL Defensive Rookie of the Year Award
- EOY – NFL Executive of the Year Award
- MVP – NFL Most Valuable Player Award
- OPOY – NFL Offensive Player of the Year Award
- SB MVP – Super Bowl Most Valuable Player Award
- WPMOY – Walter Payton NFL Man of the Year Award

Seattle Seahawks seasonal records
Season	Team	League	Conference	Division	Regular season					Postseason results	Awards	Head coach
Season	Team	League	Conference	Division	Finish	W	L	T	Pct	Postseason results	Awards	Head coach
1976	1976	NFL	NFC	West	5th	2	12	0	.143			Jack Patera
1977	1977	NFL	AFC	West	4th	5	9	0	.357			Jack Patera
1978 (Note: The NFL expanded from a 14-game regular season schedule to 16 beginning in 1978. An additional regular season game was added in 2021, bringing the total to 17 games.)	1978	NFL	AFC	West	3rd	9	7	0	.563		Jack Patera (COY)	Jack Patera
1979	1979	NFL	AFC	West	3rd	9	7	0	.563			Jack Patera
1980	1980	NFL	AFC	West	5th	4	12	0	.250			Jack Patera
1981	1981	NFL	AFC	West	5th	6	10	0	.375			Jack Patera
1982	1982	NFL	AFC	None (Note: The 1982 season was shortened to nine games after a players' strike. The top eight teams in each conference advanced to the playoffs.)	10th (Note: The Seattle Seahawks, Cleveland Browns, and Buffalo Bills each finished with a 4–5 record. Cleveland qualified for the playoffs in 8th place due to their better record against conference opponents (4–3) than Buffalo's (3–3) and Seattle's (3–5).)	4	5	0	.444			Jack Patera (0–2) Mike McCormack (4–3)
1983	1983	NFL	AFC	West	2nd^{§} (Note: The Seattle Seahawks, Cleveland Browns, and Denver Broncos each finished with 9–7 records. Seattle and Denver both had a better head-to-head record (2–1) than Cleveland (0–2), which eliminated the Browns from the playoffs. Seattle's better conference record (5–3 vs. 3–5) gave them the 1st wild card slot and the right to host the game.)	9	7	0	.563	Won Wild Card playoffs (Broncos) 31–7; Won Divisional playoffs (at Dolphins) 27–20; Lost AFC Championship (at Raiders) 14–30		Chuck Knox
1984	1984	NFL	AFC	West	2nd^{§}	12	4	0	.750	Won Wild Card playoffs (Raiders) 13–7; Lost Divisional playoffs (at Dolphins) 10–31	Chuck Knox (COY) Kenny Easley (DPOY)	Chuck Knox
1985	1985	NFL	AFC	West	3rd	8	8	0	.500			Chuck Knox
1986	1986	NFL	AFC	West	3rd (Note: The Seattle Seahawks, New York Jets, Kansas City Chiefs, and Cincinnati Bengals each finished with 10–6 records. The two wild card slots were determined by the conference records tiebreaker: New York (8–4) and Kansas (9–5) clinched playoff berths, while Seattle (7–5) and Cincinnati (7–5) were eliminated.)	10	6	0	.625			Chuck Knox
1987 (Note: The 1987 season was shortened to 15 games by a players' strike; three games were played with non-striking players.)	1987	NFL	AFC	West	2nd^{§}	9	6	0	.600	Lost Wild Card playoffs (at Oilers) 20–23 (OT)		Chuck Knox
1988	1988	NFL	AFC	West^{Δ}	1st^{Δ}	9	7	0	.563	Lost Divisional playoffs (at Bengals) 13–21	Steve Largent (WP MOY)	Chuck Knox
1989	1989	NFL	AFC	West	4th	7	9	0	.438			Chuck Knox
1990	1990	NFL	AFC	West	3rd (Note: The Seattle Seahawks, Houston Oilers, and Pittsburgh Steelers each finished with 9–7 records. The remaining AFC wild card slot was determined by the conference records tiebreaker: Houston (8–4) eliminated the Seahawks (7–5) and Steelers (6–6).)	9	7	0	.563			Chuck Knox
1991	1991	NFL	AFC	West	4th	7	9	0	.438			Chuck Knox
1992	1992	NFL	AFC	West	5th	2	14	0	.125		Cortez Kennedy (DPOY)	Tom Flores
1993	1993	NFL	AFC	West	5th	6	10	0	.375			Tom Flores
1994	1994	NFL	AFC	West	5th	6	10	0	.375			Tom Flores
1995	1995	NFL	AFC	West	3rd	8	8	0	.500			Dennis Erickson
1996	1996	NFL	AFC	West	5th	7	9	0	.438			Dennis Erickson
1997	1997	NFL	AFC	West	3rd	8	8	0	.500			Dennis Erickson
1998	1998	NFL	AFC	West	3rd	8	8	0	.500			Dennis Erickson
1999	1999	NFL	AFC	West^{Δ}	1st^{Δ} (Note: The Seattle Seahawks and Kansas City Chiefs each finished with 9–7 records. The AFC West division title was determined by head-to-head record, which the Seahawks held after defeating the Chiefs twice during the season.)	9	7	0	.563	Lost Wild Card playoffs (Dolphins) 17–20		Mike Holmgren
2000	2000	NFL	AFC	West	4th	6	10	0	.375			Mike Holmgren
2001	2001	NFL	AFC	West	2nd	9	7	0	.563			Mike Holmgren
2002	2002	NFL	NFC	West	3rd	7	9	0	.438			Mike Holmgren
2003	2003	NFL	NFC	West	2nd^{§}	10	6	0	.625	Lost Wild Card playoffs (at Packers) 27–33 (OT)		Mike Holmgren
2004	2004	NFL	NFC	West^{Δ}	1st^{Δ}	9	7	0	.563	Lost Wild Card playoffs (Rams) 20–27		Mike Holmgren
2005	2005	NFL	NFC^{†}	West^{Δ}	1st^{Δ}	13	3	0	.813	Won Divisional playoffs (Redskins) 20–10; Won NFC Championship (Panthers) 34–14; Lost Super Bowl XL (vs. Steelers) 10–21	Shaun Alexander (MVP, OPOY)	Mike Holmgren
2006	2006	NFL	NFC	West^{Δ}	1st^{Δ}	9	7	0	.563	Won Wild Card playoffs (Cowboys) 21–20; Lost Divisional playoffs (at Bears) 24–27 (OT)		Mike Holmgren
2007	2007	NFL	NFC	West^{Δ}	1st^{Δ}	10	6	0	.625	Won Wild Card playoffs (Redskins) 35–14; Lost Divisional playoffs (at Packers) 20–42		Mike Holmgren
2008	2008	NFL	NFC	West	3rd	4	12	0	.250			Mike Holmgren
2009	2009	NFL	NFC	West	3rd	5	11	0	.313			Jim L. Mora
2010	2010	NFL	NFC	West^{Δ}	1st^{Δ}	7	9	0	.438	Won Wild Card playoffs (Saints) 41–36; Lost Divisional playoffs (at Bears) 24–35		Pete Carroll
2011	2011	NFL	NFC	West	3rd	7	9	0	.438			Pete Carroll
2012	2012	NFL	NFC	West	2nd^{§}	11	5	0	.688	Won Wild Card playoffs (at Redskins) 24–14; Lost Divisional playoffs (at Falcons) 28–30		Pete Carroll
2013	2013	NFL^{‡}	NFC^{†}	West^{Δ}	1st^{Δ}	13	3	0	.813	Won Divisional playoffs (Saints) 23–15; Won NFC Championship (49ers) 23–17; Won Super Bowl XLVIII (1) (vs. Broncos) 43–8	Malcolm Smith (SB MVP)	Pete Carroll
2014	2014	NFL	NFC^{†}	West^{Δ}	1st^{Δ}	12	4	0	.750	Won Divisional playoffs (Panthers) 31–17; Won NFC Championship (Packers) 28–22 (OT); Lost Super Bowl XLIX (vs. Patriots) 24–28		Pete Carroll
2015	2015	NFL	NFC	West	2nd^{§}	10	6	0	.625	Won Wild Card playoffs (at Vikings) 10–9; Lost Divisional playoffs (at Panthers) 24–31		Pete Carroll
2016	2016	NFL	NFC	West^{Δ}	1st^{Δ}	10	5	1	.656	Won Wild Card playoffs (Lions) 26–6; Lost Divisional playoffs (at Falcons) 20–36		Pete Carroll
2017	2017	NFL	NFC	West	2nd	9	7	0	.563			Pete Carroll
2018	2018	NFL	NFC	West	2nd^{§}	10	6	0	.625	Lost Wild Card playoffs (at Cowboys) 22–24		Pete Carroll
2019	2019	NFL	NFC	West	2nd^{§}	11	5	0	.688	Won Wild Card playoffs (at Eagles) 17–9; Lost Divisional playoffs (at Packers) 23–28		Pete Carroll
2020	2020	NFL	NFC	West^{Δ}	1st^{Δ}	12	4	0	.750	Lost Wild Card playoffs (Rams) 20–30	Russell Wilson (WP MOY)	Pete Carroll
2021	2021	NFL	NFC	West	4th	7	10	0	.412			Pete Carroll
2022	2022	NFL	NFC	West	2nd^{§}	9	8	0	.529	Lost Wild Card playoffs (at 49ers) 23–41	Geno Smith (CPOY)	Pete Carroll
2023	2023	NFL	NFC	West	3rd (Note: The Seattle Seahawks, Green Bay Packers, and New Orleans Saints each finished with 9–8 records. Green Bay qualified for a wild card spot in the playoffs through the strength of victory tiebreaker, as they had defeated teams that performed better than teams defeated by the Seahawks.)	9	8	0	.529			Pete Carroll
2024	2024	NFL	NFC	West	2nd (Note: The Seattle Seahawks and Los Angeles Rams each finished with 10–7 records. The Rams won the NFC West by virtue of the strength of victory tiebreaker, as they had defeated teams that performed better than teams defeated by the Seahawks.)	10	7	0	.588			Mike Macdonald
2025	2025	NFL^{‡}	NFC^{†}	West^{Δ}	1st^{Δ}	14	3	0	.824	Won Divisional playoffs (49ers) 41–6; Won NFC Championship (Rams) 31–27; Won Super Bowl LX (2) (vs. Patriots) 29–13	John Schneider (EOY) Jaxon Smith-Njigba (OPOY) Kenneth Walker III (SB MVP)	Mike Macdonald
Total						416	376	1	.525	All-time regular season record (1976–2025)		
Total						20	19	—	.513	All-time postseason record (1976–2025)		
Total						436	395	1	.525	All-time regular & postseason record (1976–2025)		
Total						2 Super Bowl titles, 4 conference titles, 12 division titles						

== See also ==
- History of the Seattle Seahawks
