= List of New York Jets seasons =

This is a list of seasons completed by the New York Jets. The Jets, formerly known as the Titans of New York, are an American football franchise that competes as a member club in the National Football League (NFL). The list documents the season-by-season records of the Jets' franchise from 1960 to the present, including postseason records and league awards for individual players or head coaches. The Titans were a part of the inaugural season of the American Football League (AFL) in 1960. In 1963, the Titans changed their name to the Jets after a change in ownership.

The New York Jets have won one National Football League championship in Super Bowl III. In their 66-season history, they have an overall regular season record of 436 wins, 573 losses, and 8 ties through 2025. They have made 14 postseason appearances, and have an overall postseason record of 12 wins and 13 losses.

== Seasons ==
| AFL champions (1960–1969) | Super Bowl champions (1966–present) | Conference champions | Division champions | Wild Card berth |

Franchise records according to Pro-Football-Reference.com
| Season | Team | League | Conference | Division | Regular season | | | | Postseason results | Awards | Head coaches |
| Season | Team | League | Conference | Division | Finish | W | L | T | Postseason results | Awards | Head coaches |
|---|---|---|---|---|---|---|---|---|---|---|---|
Titans of New York
| 1960 | 1960 | AFL | — | East | 2nd | 7 | 7 | 0 | — | — | Sammy Baugh |
| 1961 | 1961 | AFL | — | East | 3rd | 7 | 7 | 0 | — | — | Sammy Baugh |
| 1962 | 1962 | AFL | — | East | 4th | 5 | 9 | 0 | — | — | Bulldog Turner |
New York Jets
| 1963 | 1963 | AFL | — | East | 4th | 5 | 8 | 1 | — | — | Weeb Ewbank |
| 1964 | 1964 | AFL | — | East | 3rd | 5 | 8 | 1 | — | — | Weeb Ewbank |
| 1965 | 1965 | AFL | — | East | 2nd | 5 | 8 | 1 | — | — | Weeb Ewbank |
| 1966 | 1966 | AFL | — | East | 3rd | 6 | 6 | 2 | — | — | Weeb Ewbank |
| 1967 | 1967 | AFL | — | East | 2nd | 8 | 5 | 1 | — | — | Weeb Ewbank |
| 1968 | 1968 | AFL | — | East | 1st | 11 | 3 | 0 | Won AFL Championship (Raiders) 27–23; Won Super Bowl III (1) (Colts) 16–7 | Joe Namath (MVP, SB MVP) | Weeb Ewbank |
| 1969 | 1969 | AFL | — | East | 1st | 10 | 4 | 0 | Lost Divisional playoffs (Chiefs) 6–13 | Joe Namath (MVP) | Weeb Ewbank |
| 1970 | 1970 | NFL | AFC | East | 3rd | 4 | 10 | 0 | — | — | Weeb Ewbank |
| 1971 | 1971 | NFL | AFC | East | 4th | 6 | 8 | 0 | — | — | Weeb Ewbank |
| 1972 | 1972 | NFL | AFC | East | 2nd | 7 | 7 | 0 | — | — | Weeb Ewbank |
| 1973 | 1973 | NFL | AFC | East | 5th | 4 | 10 | 0 | — | — | Weeb Ewbank |
| 1974 | 1974 | NFL | AFC | East | 4th | 7 | 7 | 0 | — | Joe Namath (CBPOY) | Charley Winner |
| 1975 | 1975 | NFL | AFC | East | 5th | 3 | 11 | 0 | — | — | Charley Winner (2–7) Ken Shipp (1–4) |
| 1976 | 1976 | NFL | AFC | East | 4th | 3 | 11 | 0 | — | — | Lou Holtz (3–10) Mike Holovak (0–1) |
| 1977 | 1977 | NFL | AFC | East | 4th | 3 | 11 | 0 | — | — | Walt Michaels |
| 1978 | 1978 | NFL | AFC | East | 3rd | 8 | 8 | 0 | — | — | Walt Michaels |
| 1979 | 1979 | NFL | AFC | East | 3rd | 8 | 8 | 0 | — | — | Walt Michaels |
| 1980 | 1980 | NFL | AFC | East | 5th | 4 | 12 | 0 | — | — | Walt Michaels |
| 1981 | 1981 | NFL | AFC | East | 2nd | 10 | 5 | 1 | Lost Wild Card playoffs (Bills) 27–31 | — | Walt Michaels |
| 1982 | 1982 | NFL | AFC | — | 6th | 6 | 3 | 0 | Won First Round playoffs (at Bengals) 44–17; Won Second Round playoffs (at Raiders) 17–14; Lost AFC Championship (at Dolphins) 0–14 | — | Walt Michaels |
| 1983 | 1983 | NFL | AFC | East | 5th | 7 | 9 | 0 | — | — | Joe Walton |
| 1984 | 1984 | NFL | AFC | East | 3rd | 7 | 9 | 0 | — | Marty Lyons (WP MOY) | Joe Walton |
| 1985 | 1985 | NFL | AFC | East | 2nd | 11 | 5 | 0 | Lost Wild Card playoffs (Patriots) 14–26 | — | Joe Walton |
| 1986 | 1986 | NFL | AFC | East | 2nd | 10 | 6 | 0 | Won Wild Card playoffs (Chiefs) 35–15; Lost Divisional playoffs (at Browns) 20–23 (2OT) | — | Joe Walton |
| 1987 | 1987 | NFL | AFC | East | 5th | 6 | 9 | 0 | — | — | Joe Walton |
| 1988 | 1988 | NFL | AFC | East | 4th | 8 | 7 | 1 | — | Erik McMillan (DROY) | Joe Walton |
| 1989 | 1989 | NFL | AFC | East | 5th | 4 | 12 | 0 | — | — | Joe Walton |
| 1990 | 1990 | NFL | AFC | East | 4th | 6 | 10 | 0 | — | — | Bruce Coslet |
| 1991 | 1991 | NFL | AFC | East | 2nd | 8 | 8 | 0 | Lost Wild Card playoffs (at Oilers) 10–17 | — | Bruce Coslet |
| 1992 | 1992 | NFL | AFC | East | 4th | 4 | 12 | 0 | — | — | Bruce Coslet |
| 1993 | 1993 | NFL | AFC | East | 3rd | 8 | 8 | 0 | — | — | Bruce Coslet |
| 1994 | 1994 | NFL | AFC | East | 5th | 6 | 10 | 0 | — | — | Pete Carroll |
| 1995 | 1995 | NFL | AFC | East | 5th | 3 | 13 | 0 | — | Hugh Douglas (DROY); Boomer Esiason (WP MOY) | Rich Kotite |
| 1996 | 1996 | NFL | AFC | East | 5th | 1 | 15 | 0 | — | — | Rich Kotite |
| 1997 | 1997 | NFL | AFC | East | 3rd | 9 | 7 | 0 | — | — | Bill Parcells |
| 1998 | 1998 | NFL | AFC | East | 1st | 12 | 4 | 0 | Won Divisional playoffs (Jaguars) 34–24; Lost AFC Championship (at Broncos) 10–23 | — | Bill Parcells |
| 1999 | 1999 | NFL | AFC | East | 4th | 8 | 8 | 0 | — | — | Bill Parcells |
| 2000 | 2000 | NFL | AFC | East | 3rd | 9 | 7 | 0 | — | — | Al Groh |
| 2001 | 2001 | NFL | AFC | East | 3rd | 10 | 6 | 0 | Lost Wild Card playoffs (at Raiders) 24–38 | — | Herm Edwards |
| 2002 | 2002 | NFL | AFC | East | 1st | 9 | 7 | 0 | Won Wild Card playoffs (Colts) 41–0; Lost Divisional playoffs (at Raiders) 10–30 | — | Herm Edwards |
| 2003 | 2003 | NFL | AFC | East | 4th | 6 | 10 | 0 | — | — | Herm Edwards |
| 2004 | 2004 | NFL | AFC | East | 2nd | 10 | 6 | 0 | Won Wild Card playoffs (at Chargers) 20–17 (OT); Lost Divisional playoffs (at Steelers) 17–20 (OT) | Jonathan Vilma (DROY) | Herm Edwards |
| 2005 | 2005 | NFL | AFC | East | 4th | 4 | 12 | 0 | — | — | Herm Edwards |
| 2006 | 2006 | NFL | AFC | East | 2nd | 10 | 6 | 0 | Lost Wild Card playoffs (at Patriots) 16–37 | Chad Pennington (CBPOY) | Eric Mangini |
| 2007 | 2007 | NFL | AFC | East | 3rd | 4 | 12 | 0 | — | — | Eric Mangini |
| 2008 | 2008 | NFL | AFC | East | 3rd | 9 | 7 | 0 | — | — | Eric Mangini |
| 2009 | 2009 | NFL | AFC | East | 2nd | 9 | 7 | 0 | Won Wild Card playoffs (at Bengals) 24–14; Won Divisional playoffs (at Chargers) 17–14; Lost AFC Championship (at Colts) 17–30 | — | Rex Ryan |
| 2010 | 2010 | NFL | AFC | East | 2nd | 11 | 5 | 0 | Won Wild Card playoffs (at Colts) 17–16; Won Divisional playoffs (at Patriots) 28–21; Lost AFC Championship (at Steelers) 19–24 | — | Rex Ryan |
| 2011 | 2011 | NFL | AFC | East | 2nd | 8 | 8 | 0 | — | — | Rex Ryan |
| 2012 | 2012 | NFL | AFC | East | 3rd | 6 | 10 | 0 | — | — | Rex Ryan |
| 2013 | 2013 | NFL | AFC | East | 2nd | 8 | 8 | 0 | — | Sheldon Richardson (DROY) | Rex Ryan |
| 2014 | 2014 | NFL | AFC | East | 4th | 4 | 12 | 0 | — | — | Rex Ryan |
| 2015 | 2015 | NFL | AFC | East | 2nd | 10 | 6 | 0 | — | — | Todd Bowles |
| 2016 | 2016 | NFL | AFC | East | 4th | 5 | 11 | 0 | — | — | Todd Bowles |
| 2017 | 2017 | NFL | AFC | East | 4th | 5 | 11 | 0 | — | — | Todd Bowles |
| 2018 | 2018 | NFL | AFC | East | 4th | 4 | 12 | 0 | — | — | Todd Bowles |
| 2019 | 2019 | NFL | AFC | East | 3rd | 7 | 9 | 0 | — | — | Adam Gase |
| 2020 | 2020 | NFL | AFC | East | 4th | 2 | 14 | 0 | — | — | Adam Gase |
| 2021 | 2021 | NFL | AFC | East | 4th | 4 | 13 | 0 | — | — | Robert Saleh |
| 2022 | 2022 | NFL | AFC | East | 4th | 7 | 10 | 0 | — | Garrett Wilson (OROY); Sauce Gardner (DROY) | Robert Saleh |
| 2023 | 2023 | NFL | AFC | East | 3rd | 7 | 10 | 0 | — | — | Robert Saleh |
| 2024 | 2024 | NFL | AFC | East | 3rd | 5 | 12 | 0 | — | — | Robert Saleh (2–3) Jeff Ulbrich (3–9) |
| 2025 | 2025 | NFL | AFC | East | 4th | 3 | 14 | 0 | — | — | Aaron Glenn |
| Totals Super Bowl Championship AFL Championship 4 Division titles | | | | | | 436 | 573 | 8 | All-time regular season record (1960–2025) | | |
| Totals Super Bowl Championship AFL Championship 4 Division titles | | | | | | 12 | 13 | — | All-time postseason record (1960–2025) | | |
| Totals Super Bowl Championship AFL Championship 4 Division titles | | | | | | 448 | 586 | 8 | All-time regular and postseason record (1960–2025) | | |

Note: Statistics are correct through the end of the 2025 NFL season.

== See also ==
- Pro-Football-Reference.com NYJ Profile
- Team Records
