= List of Cleveland Browns seasons =

The Cleveland Browns are a professional American football team based in Cleveland, Ohio. The Browns compete in the National Football League (NFL) as a member of American Football Conference (AFC) North Division. Founded in 1946, they were a charter member club of the All-America Football Conference (AAFC), where they won four league championships.

The Browns have won four NFL championships, all of which pre-date the existence of the Super Bowl. The Browns' four championships are tied for the tenth most total championships amongst all 32 NFL franchises. They are one of four current teams to have never played in the Super Bowl. Two of these teams, the Jacksonville Jaguars and the Houston Texans, are expansion teams in the AFC that began play in 1995 and 2002 respectively.

In 1995, then-Browns owner Art Modell made the decision to move the team from Cleveland, Ohio to Baltimore, Maryland. An agreement between the city of Cleveland and the NFL kept the team's history, name and colors in Cleveland, while Modell's new team would be regarded as an expansion team. The Baltimore Ravens would begin play in 1996, and the Browns would return to the league in 1999. For record-keeping purposes, the Browns are considered to have suspended operations from 1996 to 1998, which is reflected in this list. In 2017, the Cleveland Browns became the second team in NFL history (2008 Detroit Lions) to suffer an 0–16 record. In 2020, the Browns won their first playoff game since their reactivation in 1999, defeating the division champion Pittsburgh Steelers in the wild-card round.

== Seasons ==
Legend
^{(#)}	The order of league championship won by the franchise
Finish	Final position in league, division, or conference
T–#	Finished tied in that position with one or more teams
Pct	The team's winning percentage for the season
^{~}	AAFC champions (1946–1949)
^{†}	NFL champions (1920–1969)
^{‡}	Super Bowl champions (1970–present)
^{*}	Conference champions
^{^}	Division champions
^{§}	Wild Card berth
^{°}	One-game playoff berth

Cleveland Browns record by season
Season	Team	League	Conference	Division	Regular season					Postseason results	Awards	Head coach	Refs
Season	Team	League	Conference	Division	Finish	W	L	T	Pct	Postseason results	Awards	Head coach	Refs
1946	1946	AAFC^{~}		Western^{^}	1st^{^}	12	2	0	.857	Won AAFC championship (1) (Yankees) 14–9		Paul Brown	
1947	1947	AAFC^{~}		Western^{^}	1st^{^}	12	1	1	.893	Won AAFC championship (2) (at Yankees) 14–3		Paul Brown	
1948	1948	AAFC^{~}		Western^{^}	1st^{^}	14	0	0	1.000	Won AAFC championship (3) (Bills) 49–7		Paul Brown	
1949	1949	AAFC^{~}			1st^{^}	9	1	2	.833	Won AAFC playoff game (Bills) 31–21; Won AAFC championship (4) (49ers) 21–7	Paul Brown (COY)	Paul Brown	
1950	1950	NFL^{†}	American^{*}		T–1st^{°} (Note: At the end of the 1950 NFL season, the Browns and Giants had identical 10–2–0 records. To determine the team that would play in the NFL Championship Game, the NFL held a one-game conference playoff. The Browns won, 8–3.)	10	2	0	.833	Won Conference Playoffs (Giants) 8–3; Won NFL Championship (5) (Rams) 30–28		Paul Brown	
1951	1951	NFL	American^{*}		1st^{*}	11	1	0	.917	Lost NFL Championship (at Rams) 17–24	Paul Brown (COY) Otto Graham (MVP)	Paul Brown	
1952	1952	NFL	American^{*}		1st^{*}	8	4	0	.667	Lost NFL Championship (Lions) 7–17		Paul Brown	
1953	1953	NFL	Eastern^{*}		1st^{*}	11	1	0	.917	Lost NFL Championship (at Lions) 16–17	Paul Brown (COY) Otto Graham (MVP)	Paul Brown	
1954	1954	NFL^{†}	Eastern^{*}		1st^{*}	9	3	0	.750	Won NFL Championship (6) (Lions) 56–10		Paul Brown	
1955	1955	NFL^{†}	Eastern^{*}		1st^{*}	9	2	1	.792	Won NFL Championship (7) (at Rams) 38–14	Otto Graham (MVP)	Paul Brown	
1956	1956	NFL	Eastern		T–4th	5	7	0	.417			Paul Brown	
1957	1957	NFL	Eastern^{*}		1st^{*}	9	2	1	.792	Lost NFL Championship (at Lions) 14–59	Jim Brown (MVP) Paul Brown (COY)	Paul Brown	
1958	1958	NFL	Eastern		T–1st^{°} (Note: At the end of the 1958 NFL season, the Browns and Giants had identical 9–3–0 records. To determine the team that would play in the NFL Championship Game, the NFL held a one-game conference playoff. The Giants shut the Browns out 10–0.)	9	3	0	.750	Lost Conference Playoff (at Giants) 0–10	Jim Brown (MVP)	Paul Brown	
1959	1959	NFL	Eastern		T–2nd	7	5	0	.583			Paul Brown	
1960	1960	NFL	Eastern		2nd	8	3	1	.708			Paul Brown	
1961	1961	NFL	Eastern		3rd	8	5	1	.607			Paul Brown	(Note: In 1961, the NFL expanded its regular season schedule, which had been 12 games since 1947, to 14 games.)
1962	1962	NFL	Eastern		3rd	7	6	1	.536			Paul Brown	
1963	1963	NFL	Eastern		2nd	10	4	0	.714		Jim Brown (MVP)	Blanton Collier	
1964	1964	NFL^{†}	Eastern^{*}		1st^{*}	10	3	1	.750	Won NFL Championship (8) (Colts) 27–0		Blanton Collier	
1965	1965	NFL	Eastern^{*}		1st^{*}	11	3	0	.786	Lost NFL Championship (at Packers) 12–23	Jim Brown (MVP)	Blanton Collier	
1966	1966	NFL	Eastern		T–2nd	9	5	0	.643			Blanton Collier	
1967	1967	NFL	Eastern	Century^{^} (Note: In 1967, the NFL divided conferences into divisions, resulting in two divisions in each of the two conferences. Up to 1967, the league was either divided into two divisions, two conferences, or neither.)	1st^{^}	9	5	0	.643	Lost Conference Playoffs (at Cowboys) 14–52		Blanton Collier	
1968	1968	NFL	Eastern^{*}	Century^{^}	1st^{^}	10	4	0	.714	Won Conference Playoffs (Cowboys) 31–20; Lost NFL Championship (Colts) 0–34		Blanton Collier	
1969	1969	NFL	Eastern^{*}	Century^{^}	1st^{^}	10	3	1	.750	Won Conference Playoffs (at Cowboys) 38–14; Lost NFL Championship (at Vikings) 7–27		Blanton Collier	
1970	1970	NFL	AFC (Note: In 1970, the NFL and American Football League (AFL) officially merged in the AFL–NFL merger to form one league with two conferences. All ten former AFL teams as well as Pittsburgh, Cleveland, and Baltimore from the pre-merger NFL joined the AFC; the other thirteen remaining NFL teams joined the NFC. Each of those two were divided into three divisions: East, Central, and West.)	Central	2nd	7	7	0	.500			Blanton Collier	
1971	1971	NFL	AFC	Central^{^}	1st^{^}	9	5	0	.643	Lost Divisional Playoffs (Colts) 3–20		Nick Skorich	
1972	1972	NFL	AFC	Central	2nd^{§}	10	4	0	.714	Lost Divisional Playoffs (at Dolphins) 14–20		Nick Skorich	
1973	1973	NFL	AFC	Central	3rd	7	5	2	.571			Nick Skorich	
1974	1974	NFL	AFC	Central	4th	4	10	0	.286			Nick Skorich	
1975	1975	NFL	AFC	Central	4th	3	11	0	.214			Forrest Gregg	
1976	1976	NFL	AFC	Central	2nd	9	5	0	.643		Forrest Gregg (COY)	Forrest Gregg	
1977	1977	NFL	AFC	Central	4th	6	8	0	.429			Forrest Gregg (6–7) Dick Modzelewski (0–1)	
1978	1978	NFL	AFC	Central	3rd	8	8	0	.500			Sam Rutigliano	(Note: In 1978, the NFL expanded its regular season schedule, which had been 14 games since 1961, to 16 games.)
1979	1979	NFL	AFC	Central	3rd	9	7	0	.563			Sam Rutigliano	
1980	1980	NFL	AFC	Central^{^}	1st^{^}	11	5	0	.688	Lost Divisional Playoffs (Raiders) 12–14	Brian Sipe (MVP)	Sam Rutigliano	
1981	1981	NFL	AFC	Central	4th	5	11	0	.313			Sam Rutigliano	
1982	1982	NFL	AFC	— (Note: The 1982 season was shortened to nine games after a players' strike. The top eight teams in each conference advanced to the playoffs.)	8th^{§}	4	5	0	.444	Lost First Round Playoffs (at Raiders) 10–27	Chip Banks (DROY)	Sam Rutigliano	
1983	1983	NFL	AFC	Central	2nd	9	7	0	.563			Sam Rutigliano	
1984	1984	NFL	AFC	Central	3rd	5	11	0	.313			Sam Rutigliano (1–7) Marty Schottenheimer (4–4)	
1985	1985	NFL	AFC	Central^{^}	1st^{^}	8	8	0	.500	Lost Divisional Playoffs (at Dolphins) 21–24		Marty Schottenheimer	
1986	1986	NFL	AFC	Central^{^}	1st^{^}	12	4	0	.750	Won Divisional Playoffs (Jets) 23–20 (2 OT); Lost AFC Championship (Broncos) 20–23 (OT)		Marty Schottenheimer	
1987	1987	NFL	AFC	Central^{^}	1st^{^}	10	5	0	.667	Won Divisional Playoffs (Colts) 38–21; Lost AFC Championship (at Broncos) 33–38		Marty Schottenheimer	(Note: The 1987 NFL strike caused the schedule to be reduced to 15 games.)
1988	1988	NFL	AFC	Central	2nd^{§}	10	6	0	.625	Lost Wild Card Playoffs (Oilers) 23–24		Marty Schottenheimer	
1989	1989	NFL	AFC	Central^{^}	1st^{^}	9	6	1	.594	Won Divisional Playoffs (Bills) 34–30; Lost AFC Championship (at Broncos) 21–37		Bud Carson	
1990	1990	NFL	AFC	Central	4th	3	13	0	.188			Bud Carson (2–7) Jim Shofner (1–6)	
1991	1991	NFL	AFC	Central	3rd	6	10	0	.375			Bill Belichick	
1992	1992	NFL	AFC	Central	3rd	7	9	0	.438			Bill Belichick	
1993	1993	NFL	AFC	Central	3rd	7	9	0	.438			Bill Belichick	
1994	1994	NFL	AFC	Central	2nd^{§}	11	5	0	.688	Won Wild Card Playoffs (Patriots) 20–13; Lost Divisional Playoffs (at Steelers) 9–29		Bill Belichick	
1995	1995	NFL	AFC	Central	4th	5	11	0	.313			Bill Belichick	
1996	Inactive from 1996 to 1998												
1997	Inactive from 1996 to 1998												
1998	Inactive from 1996 to 1998												
1999	1999	NFL	AFC	Central	6th	2	14	0	.125			Chris Palmer	
2000	2000	NFL	AFC	Central	6th	3	13	0	.188			Chris Palmer	
2001	2001	NFL	AFC	Central	3rd	7	9	0	.438			Butch Davis	
2002	2002	NFL	AFC	North (Note: In 2002, the NFL realigned to create four divisions in both conferences with four teams in each division.)	2nd^{§}	9	7	0	.563	Lost Wild Card Playoffs (at Steelers) 33–36		Butch Davis	
2003	2003	NFL	AFC	North	4th	5	11	0	.313			Butch Davis	
2004	2004	NFL	AFC	North	4th	4	12	0	.250			Butch Davis (3–8) Terry Robiskie (1–4)	
2005	2005	NFL	AFC	North	4th	6	10	0	.375			Romeo Crennel	
2006	2006	NFL	AFC	North	4th	4	12	0	.250			Romeo Crennel	
2007	2007	NFL	AFC	North	2nd	10	6	0	.625			Romeo Crennel	
2008	2008	NFL	AFC	North	4th	4	12	0	.250			Romeo Crennel	
2009	2009	NFL	AFC	North	4th	5	11	0	.313			Eric Mangini	
2010	2010	NFL	AFC	North	3rd	5	11	0	.313			Eric Mangini	
2011	2011	NFL	AFC	North	4th	4	12	0	.250			Pat Shurmur	
2012	2012	NFL	AFC	North	4th	5	11	0	.313			Pat Shurmur	
2013	2013	NFL	AFC	North	4th	4	12	0	.250			Rob Chudzinski	
2014	2014	NFL	AFC	North	4th	7	9	0	.438			Mike Pettine	
2015	2015	NFL	AFC	North	4th	3	13	0	.188			Mike Pettine	
2016	2016	NFL	AFC	North	4th	1	15	0	.063			Hue Jackson	
2017	2017	NFL	AFC	North	4th	0	16	0	.000			Hue Jackson	
2018	2018	NFL	AFC	North	3rd	7	8	1	.469			Hue Jackson (2–5–1) Gregg Williams (5–3)	
2019	2019	NFL	AFC	North	3rd	6	10	0	.375			Freddie Kitchens	
2020	2020	NFL	AFC	North	3rd^{§}	11	5	0	.688	Won Wild Card Playoffs (at Steelers) 48–37; Lost Divisional Playoffs (at Chiefs) 17–22	Kevin Stefanski (COY)	Kevin Stefanski	
2021	2021	NFL	AFC	North	3rd	8	9	0	.471			Kevin Stefanski	(Note: In 2021, the NFL expanded its regular season schedule, which had been 16 games since 1978, to 17 games.)
2022	2022	NFL	AFC	North	4th	7	10	0	.412			Kevin Stefanski	
2023	2023	NFL	AFC	North	2nd^{§}	11	6	0	.647	Lost Wild Card Playoffs (at Texans) 14–45	Myles Garrett (DPOY) Kevin Stefanski (COY) Joe Flacco (CBPOY)	Kevin Stefanski	
2024	2024	NFL	AFC	North	4th	3	14	0	.176			Kevin Stefanski	
2025	2025	NFL	AFC	North	4th	5	12	0	.294		Myles Garrett (DPOY) Carson Schwesinger (DROY)	Kevin Stefanski	
AAFC & NFL totals						567	560	14	.503	All-time regular season record			
AAFC & NFL totals						17	22	—	.436	All-time postseason record			
AAFC & NFL totals						584	582	14	.501	All-time combined regular & postseason record			

=== All-time records ===
Statistic	Wins	Losses	Ties	Win%
Cleveland Browns regular season record (1946–1995)	421	270	13	.607
Cleveland Browns regular season record (1999–2025)	146	291	1	.334
All-time regular season record (1946–2025)	567	561	14	.503
Cleveland Browns post-season record (1946–1995)	16	19	—	.457
Cleveland Browns post-season record (1999–2025)	1	3	—	.250
All-time post-season record (1946–2025)	17	22	—	.436
All-time regular and post-season record	584	583	14	.500
