= UPI NFC Player of the Year =

American football award

From 1970 to 1984, United Press International (UPI) awarded the NFC Player of the Year award to players from the National Football League's National Football Conference (NFC). An NFC Defensive Player of the Year was named from 1975 to 1996, and an NFC Offensive Player of the Year, which replaced the overall player of the year award in 1985, was issued until 1996.

== Winners ==
=== One selection only ===
Season	Player	Team	Position
1970	John Brodie	San Francisco 49ers	Quarterback
1971	Alan Page	Minnesota Vikings	Defensive tackle
1972	Larry Brown	Washington Redskins	Running back
1973	John Hadl	Los Angeles Rams	Quarterback
1974	Jim Hart	St. Louis Cardinals	Quarterback

=== Offense and Defense selections ===
Season	Offense			Defense		
Season	Player	Team	Position	Player	Team	Position
1975	Fran Tarkenton	Minnesota Vikings	Quarterback	Jack Youngblood	Los Angeles Rams	Defensive end
1976	Chuck Foreman	Minnesota Vikings	Running back	Wally Chambers	Chicago Bears	Defensive tackle
1977	Walter Payton (1)	Chicago Bears	Running back	Harvey Martin	Dallas Cowboys	Defensive tackle
1978	Archie Manning	New Orleans Saints	Quarterback	Randy White	Dallas Cowboys	Defensive tackle
1979	Ottis Anderson	St. Louis Cardinals	Running back	Lee Roy Selmon	Tampa Bay Buccaneers	Defensive end
1980	Ron Jaworski	Philadelphia Eagles	Quarterback	Nolan Cromwell	Los Angeles Rams	Safety
1981	Tony Dorsett	Dallas Cowboys	Running back	Fred Dean	San Francisco 49ers	Defensive end
1982	Mark Moseley	Washington Redskins	Kicker	No award	-	-
1983	Eric Dickerson (1)	Los Angeles Rams	Running back	Lawrence Taylor (1)	New York Giants	Linebacker
1984	Eric Dickerson (2)	Los Angeles Rams	Running back	Mike Singletary (1)	Chicago Bears	Linebacker
1985	Walter Payton (2)	Chicago Bears	Running back	Mike Singletary (2)	Chicago Bears	Linebacker
1986	Eric Dickerson (3)	Los Angeles Rams	Running back	Lawrence Taylor (2)	New York Giants	Linebacker
1987	Jerry Rice	San Francisco 49ers	Wide receiver	Reggie White (1)	Philadelphia Eagles	Defensive end
1988	Roger Craig	San Francisco 49ers	Running back	Mike Singletary (3)	Chicago Bears	Linebacker
1989	Joe Montana	San Francisco 49ers	Quarterback	Keith Millard	Minnesota Vikings	Defensive tackle
1990	Randall Cunningham	Philadelphia Eagles	Quarterback	Charles Haley (1)	San Francisco 49ers	Linebacker
1991	Mark Rypien	Washington Redskins	Quarterback	Reggie White (2)	Philadelphia Eagles	Defensive end
1992	Steve Young (1)	San Francisco 49ers	Quarterback	Chris Doleman	Minnesota Vikings	Defensive end
1993	Emmitt Smith	Dallas Cowboys	Running back	Eric Allen	Philadelphia Eagles	Cornerback
1994	Steve Young (2)	San Francisco 49ers	Quarterback	Charles Haley (2)	Dallas Cowboys	Defensive end
1995	Brett Favre (1)	Green Bay Packers	Quarterback	Reggie White (3)	Green Bay Packers	Defensive end
1996	Brett Favre (2)	Green Bay Packers	Quarterback	Kevin Greene	Carolina Panthers	Linebacker

== Multiple-time winners ==
Total awards won
Wins	Team
9	San Francisco 49ers
6	Chicago Bears
6	Los Angeles / St. Louis Rams
5	Dallas Cowboys
5	Minnesota Vikings
5	Philadelphia Eagles
3	Green Bay Packers
3	Washington Redskins
2	New York Giants
2	St. Louis / Phoenix / Arizona Cardinals
1	Carolina Panthers
1	New Orleans Saints
1	Tampa Bay Buccaneers
0	Atlanta Falcons
0	Detroit Lions

== See also ==
- UPI AFL-AFC Player of the Year
- United Press International NFL Most Valuable Player Award
- National Football League Most Valuable Player Award
- NFL Offensive Player of the Year Award
- NFL Defensive Player of the Year Award
