= United Press International NFL Most Valuable Player =

United Press International gave an NFL Most Valuable Player award from 1948 through 1969, excepting 1949–50, and 1952. When the NFL's merger with the American Football League formed the National Football Conference (NFC) and American Football Conference (AFC) in 1970, UPI began awarding individual NFC and AFC player of the year awards.

Season	Player	Team	Position	Ref
1948	Pat Harder	Chicago Cardinals	Fullback	
1949	No award			
1950	No award			
1951	Otto Graham	Cleveland Browns	Quarterback	
1952	No award			
1953	Otto Graham (2)	Cleveland Browns	Quarterback	
1954	Joe Perry	San Francisco 49ers	Fullback	
1955	Otto Graham (3)	Cleveland Browns	Quarterback	
1956	Frank Gifford	New York Giants	Halfback	
1957	Y. A. Tittle	San Francisco 49ers	Quarterback	
1958	Jim Brown	Cleveland Browns	Fullback	
1959	Johnny Unitas	Baltimore Colts	Quarterback	
1960	Norm Van Brocklin	Philadelphia Eagles	Quarterback	
1961	Paul Hornung	Green Bay Packers	Halfback	
1962	Y. A. Tittle (2)	New York Giants	Quarterback	
1963	Jim Brown (2)	Cleveland Browns	Fullback	
1964	Johnny Unitas (2)	Baltimore Colts	Quarterback	
1965	Jim Brown (3)	Cleveland Browns	Fullback	
1966	Bart Starr	Green Bay Packers	Quarterback	
1967	Johnny Unitas (3)	Baltimore Colts	Quarterback	
1968	Earl Morrall	Baltimore Colts	Quarterback	
1969	Roman Gabriel	Los Angeles Rams	Quarterback	
