= Bert Bell Award =

American football award

- Awarded for: NFL player of the year
- Country: United States
- Presented by: Maxwell Football Club

History
- First award: 1959
- Most wins: Peyton Manning, Randall Cunningham, & Johnny Unitas (3)
- Most recent: Drake Maye

The Bert Bell Award is presented by the Maxwell Football Club to the player of the year in the National Football League (NFL). The award is named in honor of Bert Bell (1895–1959), commissioner of the NFL and founder of the Maxwell Club. Voters for the Pro Awards are NFL owners, football personnel, head and assistant coaches as well as members of the Maxwell Football Club, national media, and local media. The award consists of a trophy in the form of a statue in the likeness of Bell. The award is presented at the club's annual football banquet. Many sources refer to it as an NFL Most Valuable Player award.

== Winners ==
Season	Player	Position	Team	Ref
1959	Johnny Unitas	Quarterback	Baltimore Colts	
1960	Norm Van Brocklin	Quarterback	Philadelphia Eagles	
1961	Paul Hornung	Running back	Green Bay Packers	
1962	Andy Robustelli	Defensive end	New York Giants	
1963	Jim Brown	Running back	Cleveland Browns	
1964	Johnny Unitas (2)	Quarterback	Baltimore Colts	
1965	Pete Retzlaff	Tight end	Philadelphia Eagles	
1966	Don Meredith	Quarterback	Dallas Cowboys	
1967	Johnny Unitas (3)	Quarterback	Baltimore Colts	
1968	Leroy Kelly	Running back	Cleveland Browns	
1969	Roman Gabriel	Quarterback	Los Angeles Rams	
1970	George Blanda	Quarterback	Oakland Raiders	
1971	Roger Staubach	Quarterback	Dallas Cowboys	
1972	Larry Brown	Running back	Washington Redskins	
1973	O. J. Simpson	Running back	Buffalo Bills	
1974	Merlin Olsen	Defensive tackle	Los Angeles Rams	
1975	Fran Tarkenton	Quarterback	Minnesota Vikings	
1976	Ken Stabler	Quarterback	Oakland Raiders	
1977	Bob Griese	Quarterback	Miami Dolphins	
1978	Terry Bradshaw	Quarterback	Pittsburgh Steelers	
1979	Earl Campbell	Running back	Houston Oilers	
1980	Ron Jaworski	Quarterback	Philadelphia Eagles	
1981	Ken Anderson	Quarterback	Cincinnati Bengals	
1982	Joe Theismann	Quarterback	Washington Redskins	
1983	John Riggins	Running back	Washington Redskins	
1984	Dan Marino	Quarterback	Miami Dolphins	
1985	Walter Payton	Running back	Chicago Bears	
1986	Lawrence Taylor	Linebacker	New York Giants	
1987	Jerry Rice	Wide receiver	San Francisco 49ers	
1988	Randall Cunningham	Quarterback	Philadelphia Eagles	
1989	Joe Montana	Quarterback	San Francisco 49ers	
1990	Randall Cunningham (2)	Quarterback	Philadelphia Eagles	
1991	Barry Sanders	Running back	Detroit Lions	
1992	Steve Young	Quarterback	San Francisco 49ers	
1993	Emmitt Smith	Running back	Dallas Cowboys	
1994	Steve Young (2)	Quarterback	San Francisco 49ers	
1995	Brett Favre	Quarterback	Green Bay Packers	
1996	Brett Favre (2)	Quarterback	Green Bay Packers	
1997	Barry Sanders (2)	Running back	Detroit Lions	
1998	Randall Cunningham (3)	Quarterback	Minnesota Vikings	
1999	Kurt Warner	Quarterback	St. Louis Rams	
2000	Rich Gannon	Quarterback	Oakland Raiders	
2001	Marshall Faulk	Running back	St. Louis Rams	
2002	Rich Gannon (2)	Quarterback	Oakland Raiders	
2003	Peyton Manning	Quarterback	Indianapolis Colts	
2004	Peyton Manning (2)	Quarterback	Indianapolis Colts	
2005	Shaun Alexander	Running back	Seattle Seahawks	
2006	LaDainian Tomlinson	Running back	San Diego Chargers	
2007	Tom Brady	Quarterback	New England Patriots	
2008	Adrian Peterson	Running back	Minnesota Vikings	
2009	Drew Brees	Quarterback	New Orleans Saints	
2010	Michael Vick	Quarterback	Philadelphia Eagles	
2011	Aaron Rodgers	Quarterback	Green Bay Packers	
2012	Adrian Peterson (2)	Running back	Minnesota Vikings	
2013	Peyton Manning (3)	Quarterback	Denver Broncos	
2014	J. J. Watt	Defensive end	Houston Texans	
2015	Cam Newton	Quarterback	Carolina Panthers	
2016	Matt Ryan	Quarterback	Atlanta Falcons	
2017	Carson Wentz	Quarterback	Philadelphia Eagles	
2018	Patrick Mahomes	Quarterback	Kansas City Chiefs	
2019	Lamar Jackson	Quarterback	Baltimore Ravens	
2020	No award given.			
2021	Jonathan Taylor	Running back	Indianapolis Colts	
2022	Jalen Hurts	Quarterback	Philadelphia Eagles	
2023	Lamar Jackson (2)	Quarterback	Baltimore Ravens	
2024	Saquon Barkley	Running back	Philadelphia Eagles	
2025	Drake Maye	Quarterback	New England Patriots	

== Multiple-time winners ==
List of multiple-time winners
Awards	Player	Team(s)	Years	Hall of Fame induction
3	Randall Cunningham	Philadelphia Eagles (2) / Minnesota Vikings (1)	1988, 1990, 1998	No
3	Peyton Manning	Indianapolis Colts (2) / Denver Broncos (1)	2003, 2004, 2013	2021
3	Johnny Unitas	Baltimore Colts	1959, 1964, 1967	1979
2	Brett Favre	Green Bay Packers	1995, 1996	2016
2	Rich Gannon	Oakland Raiders	2000, 2002	No
2	Lamar Jackson	Baltimore Ravens	2019, 2023	Active
2	Adrian Peterson	Minnesota Vikings	2008, 2012	Eligible in 2027
2	Barry Sanders	Detroit Lions	1991, 1997	2004
2	Steve Young	San Francisco 49ers	1992, 1994	2005

== See also ==
- NFL Most Valuable Player Award
- List of NFL awards
