= List of NFL Comeback Player of the Year awards =

A number of NFL Comeback Player of the Year awards are given to National Football League (NFL) players who have demonstrated resilience in the face of adversity by overcoming illness, physical injury or other circumstances that led them to miss playing time the previous season. The awards have been presented by several organizations, including the Associated Press (AP), Pro Football Writers Association (PFWA), The Sporting News, and United Press International (UPI).

== United Press International ==
In 1962, United Press International (UPI) chose a comeback player of the year for the first time. The winner, Frank Gifford, had made a comeback from a devastating injury from a hit by Chuck Bednarik.

| Season | Player | Position | Team | Ref. |
|---|---|---|---|---|
| 1962 | Frank Gifford | WR | NY Giants | |
| 1963 | Ed Brown | QB | Pittsburgh | |
| 1969 | Gale Sayers | RB | Chicago | |

== Associated Press ==
From 1963 to 1966, the award was given by the Associated Press (AP) to both an NFL and AFL player. No award was given between 1966 and 1998. Paul Lowe, Chad Pennington, and Joe Burrow are the only recipients of the award to have won twice.

=== 1963–1966 ===
| NFL | | | | AFL | | | |
| Season | Player | Position | Team | Season | Player | Position | Team |
|---|---|---|---|---|---|---|---|
| 1963 | Jim Martin | K | Baltimore | 1963 | Paul Lowe | RB | San Diego |
| 1964 | Lenny Moore | RB | Baltimore | 1964 | Abner Haynes | RB | Kansas City |
| 1965 | John Brodie | QB | San Francisco | 1965 | Paul Lowe | RB | San Diego |
| 1966 | Dick Bass | RB | LA Rams | 1966 | Babe Parilli | QB | Boston |

=== 1998–2025 ===
| Season | Player | Position | Team |
|---|---|---|---|
| 1998 | Doug Flutie | QB | Buffalo |
| 1999 | Bryant Young | DT | San Francisco |
| 2000 | Joe Johnson | DE | New Orleans |
| 2001 | Garrison Hearst | RB | San Francisco |
| 2002 | Tommy Maddox | QB | Pittsburgh |
| 2003 | Jon Kitna | QB | Cincinnati |
| 2004 | Drew Brees | QB | San Diego |
| 2005 | Tedy Bruschi | LB | New England |
| 2005 | Steve Smith Sr. | WR | Carolina |
| 2006 | Chad Pennington | QB | NY Jets |
| 2007 | Greg Ellis | DE | Dallas |
| 2008 | Chad Pennington | QB | Miami |
| 2009 | Tom Brady | QB | New England |
| 2010 | Michael Vick | QB | Philadelphia |
| 2011 | Matthew Stafford | QB | Detroit |
| 2012 | Peyton Manning | QB | Denver |
| 2013 | Philip Rivers | QB | San Diego |
| 2014 | Rob Gronkowski | TE | New England |
| 2015 | Eric Berry | S | Kansas City |
| 2016 | Jordy Nelson | WR | Green Bay |
| 2017 | Keenan Allen | WR | LA Chargers |
| 2018 | Andrew Luck | QB | Indianapolis |
| 2019 | Ryan Tannehill | QB | Tennessee |
| 2020 | Alex Smith | QB | Washington |
| 2021 | Joe Burrow | QB | Cincinnati |
| 2022 | Geno Smith | QB | Seattle |
| 2023 | Joe Flacco | QB | Cleveland |
| 2024 | Joe Burrow | QB | Cincinnati |
| 2025 | Christian McCaffrey | RB | San Francisco |

== Pro Football Weekly / Pro Football Writers Association ==
From 1972 to 1991, the Comeback Player of the Year award was presented by Pro Football Weekly (PFW) only. PFW and the Pro Football Writers Association (PFWA) combined their awards from 1992 to 2012.

| Season | Player | Position | Team |
|---|---|---|---|
| 1972 | Earl Morrall | QB | Miami |
| 1973 | Roman Gabriel | QB | Philadelphia |
| 1974 | Joe Namath | QB | NY Jets |
| 1975 | Dave Hampton | RB | Atlanta |
| 1976 | Greg Landry | QB | Detroit |
| 1977 | Craig Morton | QB | Denver |
| 1978 | John Riggins | RB | Washington |
| 1979 | Larry Csonka | FB | Miami |
| 1980 | Jim Plunkett | QB | Oakland |
| 1981 | Ken Anderson | QB | Cincinnati |
| 1982 | Lyle Alzado | DE | LA Raiders |
| 1983 | Billy Johnson | WR | Atlanta |
| 1984 | John Stallworth | WR | Pittsburgh |
| 1985 | No award given | | |
| 1986 | Joe Montana | QB | San Francisco |
| 1986 | Tommy Kramer | QB | Minnesota |
| 1987 | Charles White | RB | LA Rams |
| 1988 | Greg Bell | RB | LA Rams |
| 1989 | Ottis Anderson | RB | NY Giants |
| 1990 | Barry Word | RB | Kansas City |
| 1991 | Jim McMahon | QB | Philadelphia |
| 1992 | Randall Cunningham | QB | Philadelphia |
| 1993 | Marcus Allen | RB | Kansas City |
| 1994 | Dan Marino | QB | Miami |
| 1995 | Jim Harbaugh | QB | Indianapolis |
| 1995 | Garrison Hearst | RB | Arizona |
| 1996 | Jerome Bettis | RB | Pittsburgh |
| 1997 | Robert Brooks | WR | Green Bay |
| 1998 | Doug Flutie | QB | Buffalo |
| 1999 | Bryant Young | DT | San Francisco |
| 2000 | Joe Johnson | DE | New Orleans |
| 2001 | Garrison Hearst | RB | San Francisco |
| 2002 | Tommy Maddox | QB | Pittsburgh |
| 2003 | Jon Kitna | QB | Cincinnati |
| 2004 | Willis McGahee | RB | Buffalo |
| 2005 | Steve Smith | WR | Carolina |
| 2006 | Chad Pennington | QB | NY Jets |
| 2007 | Randy Moss | WR | New England |
| 2008 | Chad Pennington | QB | Miami |
| 2009 | Tom Brady | QB | New England |
| 2010 | Michael Vick | QB | Philadelphia |
| 2011 | Matthew Stafford | QB | Detroit |
| 2012 | Adrian Peterson | RB | Minnesota |
| 2013 | Philip Rivers | QB | San Diego |
| 2014 | Rob Gronkowski | TE | New England |
| 2015 | Eric Berry | S | Kansas City |
| 2016 | Jordy Nelson | WR | Green Bay |
| 2017 | Keenan Allen | WR | LA Chargers |
| 2018 | Andrew Luck | QB | Indianapolis |
| 2019 | Ryan Tannehill | QB | Tennessee |
| 2020 | Josh Allen | QB | Buffalo |
| 2021 | Joe Burrow | QB | Cincinnati |
| 2022 | Geno Smith | QB | Seattle |
| 2023 | Damar Hamlin | S | Buffalo |
| 2024 | Joe Burrow | QB | Cincinnati |
| 2025 | Christian McCaffrey | RB | San Francisco |

== The Sporting News ==
| Season | Player | Position | Team | Ref. |
|---|---|---|---|---|
| 2008 | Antonio Bryant | WR | Tampa Bay | |
| 2009 | Vince Young | QB | Tennessee | |
| 2010 | Michael Vick | QB | Philadelphia | |
| 2011 | Plaxico Burress | WR | NY Jets | |
| 2012 | Adrian Peterson | RB | Minnesota | |
| 2013 | Darrelle Revis | CB | Tampa Bay | |
| 2014 | Rob Gronkowski | TE | New England | |
| 2015 | Carson Palmer | QB | Arizona | |
| 2016 | Jordy Nelson | WR | Green Bay | |
| 2017 | Keenan Allen | WR | LA Chargers | |
| 2018 | Andrew Luck | QB | Indianapolis | |
| 2019 | Jimmy Garoppolo | QB | San Francisco | |
| 2020 | Alex Smith | QB | Washington | |
| 2021 | Joe Burrow | QB | Cincinnati | |
| 2022 | Geno Smith | QB | Seattle | |
| 2023 | Tua Tagovailoa | QB | Miami | |
| 2024 | Sam Darnold | QB | Minnesota | |
| 2025 | Christian McCaffrey | RB | San Francisco | |

== See also ==
- List of NFL awards
