= Suncoast Technical Education Center =

Public technical school in, Brooksville, Florida

Suncoast Technical Education Center is a public technical school in Brooksville, Florida. It is a joint venture between the Hernando County School District and the office of business development. It serves students 16 and older and is located in Nature Coast Technical High School.
