= Weeki Wachee High School =

Public school in Weeki Wachee, Florida, United States

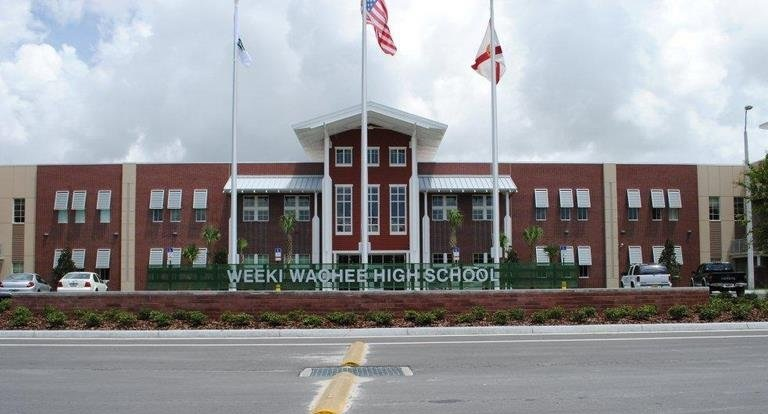

Location
- 12150 Vespa Way; Weeki Wachee, Florida 34614; United States; 28.6004°N 82.5490°W

Information
- Type: Public
- Established: 2010
- School district: Hernando County School Board
- NCES School ID: 120081006808
- Principal: Edward Larose
- Staff: 65.00 (on FTE basis)
- Grades: 9 to 12
- Enrollment: 1,435 (2022–2023)
- Student to teacher ratio: 22.08
- Colors: Green; Black
- Mascot: Hornets
- Rival: Central High School (Brooksville, Florida)
- Website: WWHS

Weeki Wachee High School (WWHS) is a public secondary school located at 12150 Vespa Way in Weeki Wachee, Florida. Operating within the Hernando County School District, the school serves students in grades 9 through 12. Its athletic teams compete as the Hornets.

== Overview and campus ==
Established to support the growing student population in western Hernando County, Weeki Wachee High School features modern academic classrooms, specialized career and technical education (CTE) facilities, media centers, and athletic grounds.

== Academics and student resources ==
The school offers a comprehensive curriculum including core academic subjects, Advanced Placement (AP) courses, dual-enrollment opportunities, and vocational training programs.

== Athletics and extracurriculars ==
Weeki Wachee High School competes in the Florida High School Athletic Association (FHSAA). Competing under the Hornets moniker, the school fields varsity and junior varsity teams across multiple sports, including:

- Football
- Basketball
- Track & Field / Cross Country
- Volleyball
- Baseball & Softball
- Soccer

In addition to athletics, WWHS hosts a variety of student-led clubs, performing arts groups, and career-focused organizations such as the Florida Future Educators of America (FFEA).
