= Frank W. Springstead High School =

Coordinates: 28.469165°N 82.6164888°W

Location
- 3300 Mariner Boulevard; Spring Hill, Florida 34609; United States

Information
- Type: Public high school
- Established: 1975
- Status: Open
- School district: Hernando County School Board
- Principal: Brandon Wright
- Faculty: 110
- Teaching staff: 84.00 (FTE)
- Grades: 9 - 12
- Enrollment: 1,893 (2023–2024)
- Student to teacher ratio: 22.54
- Colors: Red; White; Blue
- Athletics: Baseball, basketball, cross country, football, golf, marching band, soccer, softball, swimming, tennis, track and field, volleyball, weightlifting, wrestling, flag football
- Mascot: The Eagle
- Rival: Nature Coast Technical High School
- Accreditation: Florida Department of Education
- National ranking: 929
- Website: F.W. Springstead High School

Frank W. Springstead High School is a public Hernando County high school in Spring Hill, Florida. The school opened on December 1, 1975, and had its first graduation class in 1979. In 2014, Springstead High School was ranked as #929 which was based on their Advanced Placement test scores, graduation rate, and SAT and ACT scores. Springstead High School was chosen to become the only International Baccalaureate school in Hernando County. This program started in the 2008–2009 school year.

== Bell schedule ==
As of the 2021–2022 school year, the school day is composed of seven 48-minute periods. Lunch is served in period 5. Fourth period is a study hall for students to complete their homework and make up work. The school day begins at 7:20 AM and ends at 2:10 PM.

== Career and Technical Studies ==
Springstead offers career-focused studies in the biomedical, marketing, and film fields, offering certifications in each of the three programs. Springstead's career and technical studies are not the strongest due to the focus on college-readiness rather than learning a career in high school.

== Dual enrollment ==
The school also has a dual enrollment program through Pasco–Hernando State College, where online and on-campus options can be explored.

== Online studies ==
Springstead works in conjunction with Florida Virtual School and Hernando e-school to provide access to online high school courses and allows students to take online college courses through Pasco-Hernando State College.

== International Baccalaureate ==
Springstead is the only high school in Hernando county currently offering an IB program. Students begin in a pre-IB program in freshman and sophomore years before beginning the core IB program in junior year and finishing it senior year. Springstead currently offers several standard-level (SL) and high-level courses (HL) and the program as a whole is well regarded by the community.

To earn an IB diploma, one has to take courses from six subjects, one each from groups 1–5, and either one from group 6 or a substitute from one of the other groups.

- Group 1: Language A: literature, Language A: language and literature, and Literature and performance.
- Group 2: Classical languages, Language B, and Language ab initio
- Group 3: Business management, Economics, Geography, History, Information technology in a global society, Philosophy, Psychology, Social and cultural anthropology, World religions, and Global Politics
- Group 4: Biology, Chemistry, Computer Science, Design Technology, Environmental systems and societies, Physics, and Sports, exercise and health science
- Group 5: Mathematical Studies SL (known as Math Studies), Mathematics SL, Mathematics HL, and Further Mathematics HL
- Group 6: Dance, Film, Music, Theatre, and Visual Arts

Each student beginning in their junior year is allowed to choose three SL courses and three HL courses. At the end of either junior or senior year, depending on if the courses are one year or two year long courses, the student will take an I.B. mandated exam. Each of the six exams will be scored out of 7. The I.B. diploma requires you to score at least a 24 cumulative points to earn the diploma.

Along with those courses, Theory of Knowledge is a mandatory course for all I.B. students, students must complete a community service project (CAS), and must complete a 4,000 word extended essay (EE) on a subject area of their choice.

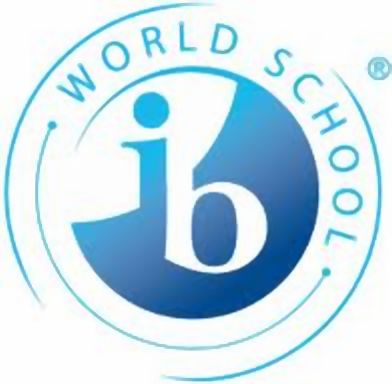
F.W. Springstead is an I.B. World School.

== Theatre program ==
Springstead offers theater as an elective all throughout the four years of high school. Taught by B. Pusta, the students who are involved in her classroom are taught the fundamentals of not only theatre, but of life.

Springstead's theatre program is bolstered by national registration as a Thespian troupe. Springstead's Thespian troupe resides in District 14, and is numbered 3910. Traditionally doing well at both district and state levels, troupe 3910 represents Hernando County and Springstead with distinction. During the school year of 2016–17, the troupe scored numerous excellent and superior ratings at District 14 competition along with two critics' choices. Many competitors went on to the state level (to then score excellent and superior ratings at the state level), including a one-act play entitled Seagulls by Carol Churchill. The cast of the one-act (Ashley E., Jerry L., and Mya P.) scored straight superiors at both the district level and the state level, making a mark on the already prestigious and well-represented troupe 3910.

Director of chorus M. Pennington hosts and directs his musicals in the Springstead theatre, twice a year. In the 2016–17 school year, his musicals of choice were A Christmas Carol and Tarzan.

== Band Program ==
Springstead's Marching Eagle Brigade is consistently one of the highest-ranking marching bands in the state. From 2005 to 2023, Springstead placed in the top five all but 5 years at Florida Marching Band Championships State Finals. As of 2024 onwards, they now compete in FFCC.

In November 2012, Springstead won the Class 2A Florida Marching Band Championships at Tropicana Field in St. Petersburg, Florida. At the 2021 Florida Marching Band Championships, they placed 5th in Class 2A at the World Equestrian Center in Ocala, Florida.

The Springstead band program also includes Concert Band, Jazz Band, Percussion, Orchestra, and AP Music Theory.

Springstead's Band has been under the direction of Richard Dasher since 1989. After his retirement in 2023, Leah Huston took the role. As of September 2025, she has left the position, and a new director is currently being looked for.

== Submarine team ==
In 2009, Springstead's human-powered submarine team, Sublime Race Team, placed first in the Tenth International Submarine Races in Bethesda, MD, edging out 17 universities and 1 other high school. Headed by Stephen Barton, the Sublime Race Team is composed of high school students within the Hernando county school district.

== Air Force Junior ROTC ==
The FL-952 Air Force JROTC Group was established at F.W. Springstead High School in August 1995 by an agreement between the Hernando County School Board and the United States Air Force. In recent years, the group has shifted its main focus from competing in drill competitions in Florida, and the occasional Regionals in Georgia, to helping the community in various ways. For example, FL-952 has partnered with Junior Achievement of Tampa Bay in having JROTC cadets become teachers for a day. In their case, having the cadets go to nearby Explorer K-8 to teach 2nd graders on how money flows in a community. The JROTC program has also participated in the annual Kiwanis Club Christmas Parade in Brooksville over the past two years. FL-952 plan to increase their role in the community over the next few years, especially with the changing of both their SASI and ASI instructors starting the 2014–2015 school year.

== Notable alumni ==
- Huey Whittaker – football player
- Corey Hill (class of 1997) – wrestler; Former professional mixed martial arts fighter
- Andy Leavine (class of 2006) - professional wrestler
- Chris White (class of 2001) - journalist; Pulitzer prize winner
- Zachary James- TV, stage actor, opera singer

== Sources ==
- F.W. Springstead High School
- https://web.archive.org/web/20120103102949/http://schoolgrades.fldoe.org/
