= 2012–13 NFL playoffs =

American football tournament

- Dates: January 5–February 3, 2013
- Season: 2012
- Teams: 12
- Games played: 11
- Super Bowl XLVII site: Mercedes-Benz Superdome; New Orleans, Louisiana
- Defending champions: New York Giants (did not qualify)
- Champion: Baltimore Ravens (2nd title)
- Runner-up: San Francisco 49ers
- Conference runners-up: Atlanta Falcons; New England Patriots
NFL playoffs
← 2011–12	2013–14 →

The National Football League playoffs for the 2012 season began on January 5, 2013. The postseason tournament concluded with the Baltimore Ravens defeating the San Francisco 49ers in Super Bowl XLVII, 34–31, on February 3, at the Mercedes-Benz Superdome in New Orleans, Louisiana.

All playoff teams in both conferences won at least 10 games, the first time since 2005. This was also the most recent NFL postseason to feature a game that went into double overtime. It was also the first time since 1999 that no Pennsylvania-based NFL team made the playoffs.

Unless otherwise noted, all times listed are Eastern Standard Time (UTC-05)

== Participants ==
Within each conference, the four division winners and the top two non-division winners with the best overall regular season records) qualified for the playoffs. The four division winners are seeded 1–4 based on their overall won-lost-tied record, and the wild card teams are seeded 5–6. The NFL does not use a fixed bracket playoff system, and there are no restrictions regarding teams from the same division matching up in any round. In the first round, dubbed the wild-card playoffs or wild-card weekend, the third-seeded division winner hosts the sixth-seed wild card, and the fourth seed hosts the fifth. The 1 and 2 seeds from each conference received a first-round bye. In the second round, the divisional playoffs, the number 1 seed hosts the worst-surviving seed from the first round (seed 4, 5, or 6), while the number 2 seed will play the other team (seed 3, 4, or 5). The two surviving teams from each conference's divisional playoff games met in the respective AFC and NFC Conference Championship games, hosted by the higher seed. Although the Super Bowl, the championship round of the playoffs, is played at a neutral site, the designated home team is based on an annual rotation by conference.

Playoff seeds
Seed	AFC	NFC
1	Denver Broncos (West winner)	Atlanta Falcons (South winner)
2	New England Patriots (East winner)	San Francisco 49ers (West winner)
3	Houston Texans (South winner)	Green Bay Packers (North winner)
4	Baltimore Ravens (North winner)	Washington Redskins (East winner)
5	Indianapolis Colts (wild card)	Seattle Seahawks (wild card)
6	Cincinnati Bengals (wild card)	Minnesota Vikings (wild card)

== Bracket ==
Jan 6 – M&T Bank Stadium	Jan 12 – Sports Authority Field at Mile High
5	Indianapolis	9
4	Baltimore	38**
4	Baltimore	24	Jan 20 – Gillette Stadium
1	Denver	35
AFC
Jan 5 – Reliant Stadium	4	Baltimore	28
Jan 13 – Gillette Stadium
2	New England	13
6	Cincinnati	13	AFC Championship
3	Houston	28
3	Houston	19	Feb 3 – Mercedes-Benz Superdome
2	New England	41
Wild Card playoffs
Divisional playoffs
Jan 5 – Lambeau Field	A4	Baltimore	34
Jan 12 – Candlestick Park
N2	San Francisco	31
6	Minnesota	10	Super Bowl XLVII
3	Green Bay	31
3	Green Bay	24	Jan 20 – Georgia Dome
2	San Francisco	45
NFC
Jan 6 – FedExField	2	San Francisco	28
Jan 13 – Georgia Dome
1	Atlanta	24
5	Seattle	24	NFC Championship
5	Seattle	28
4	Washington	14
1	Atlanta	30

** Indicates 2OT victory

== Schedule ==
In the United States, NBC broadcast the first two Wild Card playoff games. Fox then televised the rest of the NFC games. CBS broadcast the rest of the AFC playoff games and the Super Bowl. All games were broadcast by Dial Global radio.

Round	Away team	Score	Home team	Date	Kickoff (ET / UTC-5)	TV
Wild-card round	Cincinnati Bengals	13–19	Houston Texans	January 5, 2013	4:30 pm	NBC
Wild-card round	Minnesota Vikings	10–24	Green Bay Packers	January 5, 2013	8:00 pm	NBC
Wild-card round	Indianapolis Colts	9–24	Baltimore Ravens	January 6, 2013	1:00 pm	CBS
Wild-card round	Seattle Seahawks	24–14	Washington Redskins	January 6, 2013	4:30 pm	Fox
Divisional round	Baltimore Ravens	38–35 (2OT)	Denver Broncos	January 12, 2013	4:30 pm	CBS
Divisional round	Green Bay Packers	31–45	San Francisco 49ers	January 12, 2013	8:00 pm	Fox
Divisional round	Seattle Seahawks	28–30	Atlanta Falcons	January 13, 2013	1:00 pm	Fox
Divisional round	Houston Texans	28–41	New England Patriots	January 13, 2013	4:30 pm	CBS
Conference championships	San Francisco 49ers	28–24	Atlanta Falcons	January 20, 2013	3:00 pm	Fox
Conference championships	Baltimore Ravens	28–13	New England Patriots	January 20, 2013	6:30 pm	CBS
Super Bowl XLVII Mercedes-Benz Superdome New Orleans, Louisiana	Baltimore Ravens	34–31	San Francisco 49ers	February 3, 2013	6:30 pm	CBS

== Wild-card round ==
=== Saturday, January 5, 2013 ===
==== AFC: Houston Texans 19, Cincinnati Bengals 13 ====
Cincinnati Bengals vs. Houston Texans – Game summary

Quarter	1	2	3	4	Total
Bengals	0	7	3	3	13
Texans	3	6	7	3	19

at Reliant Stadium, Houston, Texas

- Date: January 5
- Game time: 4:30 p.m. EST/3:30 p.m. CST
- Game weather: Played with roof closed, retractable roof stadium
- Game attendance: 71,738
- Referee: Alberto Riveron
- TV announcers (NBC): Dan Hicks (play-by-play), Mike Mayock (color commentator), and Alex Flanagan (sideline reporter)
- Recap

Game information

1st quarter

- HOU – Shayne Graham 48-yard field goal, 7:49. Texans 3–0. Drive: 9 plays, 65 yards, 4:19.

2nd quarter

- HOU – Shayne Graham 27-yard field goal, 13:07. Texans 6–0. Drive: 12 plays, 60 yards, 7:05.
- CIN – Leon Hall 21-yard interception return (Josh Brown kick), 9:30. Bengals 7–6.
- HOU – Shayne Graham 22-yard field goal, 2:19. Texans 9–7. Drive: 13 plays, 76 yards, 7:11.

3rd quarter

- HOU – Arian Foster 1-yard run (Shayne Graham kick), 10:31. Texans 16–7. Drive: 6 plays, 51 yards, 3:20.
- CIN – Josh Brown 34-yard field goal, 7:48. Texans 16–10. Drive: 7 plays, 64 yards, 2:43.

4th quarter

- HOU – Shayne Graham 24-yard field goal, 14:17. Texans 19–10. Drive: 8 plays, 20 yards, 3:49.
- CIN – Josh Brown 47-yard field goal, 9:03. Texans 19–13. Drive: 10 plays, 32 yards, 5:14.

Leading passers

- CIN – Andy Dalton – 14/30, 127 yards, 1 INT
- HOU – Matt Schaub – 29/38, 262 yards, 1 INT

Leading rushers

- CIN – BenJarvus Green-Ellis – 11 rushes, 63 yards
- HOU – Arian Foster – 32 rushes, 140 yards, 1 TD

Leading receivers

- CIN – A. J. Green – 5 rec, 80 yards
- HOU – Owen Daniels – 9 rec, 91 yards

For the second year in a row, Houston defeated Cincinnati in the first game of the playoffs, outgaining them in total yards 428–198 and holding their offense to just two field goals in nine drives (including 0/9 on third downs). The win was especially satisfying for Texans quarterback Matt Schaub, who was playing in his first playoff game in his nine-season career.

On the Texans' second drive of the game, they moved the ball 65 yards and scored on a 48-yard field goal from Shayne Graham (a former Bengal). Then, after forcing a punt, they drove the ball all the way to the Bengals 9-yard line, but once again settled for a Graham field goal a few minutes into the second quarter.

Following another Cincinnati punt, the Bengals took their first lead of the game when Leon Hall intercepted a pass intended for James Casey on the left sideline and returned it 21 yards for a touchdown. But the Texans took it back with a 61-yard drive to the Bengals 4-yard line, 46 coming from Arian Foster, that resulted in Graham's third field goal, making the score 9–7 at the end of the half.

Early in the third quarter, a fair catch interference penalty on Bengals Chris Lewis-Harris gave Houston the ball on the Cincinnati 49-yard line. Houston then drove 51 yards, featuring a 22-yard completion from Schaub to Andre Johnson, and scored on a 1-yard touchdown run by Foster. The Bengals struck back with Andy Dalton's 45-yard completion to A. J. Green setting up Josh Brown's 34-yard field goal to cut the score to 16–10. Cincinnati managed to force a punt on Houston's next drive, but with just over three minutes left in the third quarter, Johnathan Joseph (another former Bengal) intercepted Dalton's pass and returned it 16 yards to the Bengals 24-yard line. This led to Graham's fourth field goal on the second play of the fourth quarter.

Bengals receiver Brandon Tate returned the ensuing kickoff 43 yards to the 39-yard line, sparking a drive that ended with Brown's 47-yard field goal that trimmed the lead to one score, 19–13. Cincinnati then forced a punt and drove into Texans territory, but on fourth down and 11 from the Houston 36-yard line, rookie receiver Marvin Jones was tackled by Joseph and Shiloh Keo three yards short of the first down marker. Houston then took over and held the ball for the final 2:44 of the game to clinch the victory.

Foster finished the game with 32 carries for 140 yards and a touchdown, along with eight receptions for 32. He became the first player ever to rush for over 100 yards in each of his first three career playoff games. Tight end Owen Daniels was the top receiver of the game with nine receptions for 91 yards, while Green had five receptions for 80 yards to lead Cincinnati. With this loss, Cincinnati's playoff win drought was extended to 22 years and remains the longest among all 32 NFL teams.

This was the second consecutive postseason meeting (and second overall) between the Bengals and Texans. Houston won 31–10 in the 2011 AFC Wild Card playoffs.

==== NFC: Green Bay Packers 24, Minnesota Vikings 10 ====
Minnesota Vikings vs. Green Bay Packers – Game summary

Quarter	1	2	3	4	Total
Vikings	3	0	0	7	10
Packers	7	10	7	0	24

at Lambeau Field, Green Bay, Wisconsin

- Date: January 5
- Game time: 8:00 p.m. EST/7:00 p.m. CST
- Game weather: 29 °F (−2 °C), cloudy
- Game attendance: 71,548
- Referee: Scott Green
- TV announcers (NBC): Al Michaels (play-by-play), Cris Collinsworth (color commentator), and Michele Tafoya (sideline reporter)
- Recap

Game information

1st quarter

- MIN – Blair Walsh 33-yard field goal, 9:26. Vikings 3–0. Drive: 10 plays, 63 yards, 5:34.
- GB – DuJuan Harris 9-yard run (Mason Crosby kick), 0:28. Packers 7–3. Drive: 11 plays, 82 yards, 5:43.

2nd quarter

- GB – Mason Crosby 20-yard field goal, 3:25. Packers 10–3. Drive: 11 plays, 72 yards, 5:01.
- GB – John Kuhn 3-yard run (Mason Crosby kick), 0:38. Packers 17–3. Drive: 5 plays, 62 yards, 1:10.

3rd quarter

- GB – John Kuhn 9-yard pass from Aaron Rodgers (Mason Crosby kick), 9:25. Packers 24–3. Drive: 12 plays, 80 yards, 5:35.

4th quarter

- MIN – Michael Jenkins 50-yard pass from Joe Webb (Blair Walsh kick), 3:39. Packers 24–10. Drive: 3 plays, 66 yards, 0:36.

Leading passers

- MIN – Joe Webb – 11/30, 180 yards, 1 TD, 1 INT
- GB – Aaron Rodgers – 23/33, 274 yards, 1 TD

Leading rushers

- MIN – Adrian Peterson – 22 rushes, 99 yards
- GB – DuJuan Harris – 17 rushes, 41 yards, 1 TD

Leading receivers

- MIN – Michael Jenkins – 3 rec, 96 yards, 1 TD
- GB – Greg Jennings – 4 rec, 61 yards

The Vikings got into the playoffs by a win in their season finale as quarterback Christian Ponder helped lead the team to victory. However, Ponder had suffered a shoulder injury during the win and was declared inactive for Minnesota's playoff game against the Packers. Joe Webb, who had not played in a single game during the 2012 season and had not started at quarterback since 2010, was given the start.

Minnesota's Marcus Sherels returned the opening kickoff 37 yards to the 35-yard line. From there, the Vikings drove to the Packers 15 with eight running plays, including a 17-yard scramble by Webb. Rookie kicker Blair Walsh finished the drive with a 33-yard field goal to give Minnesota a 3–0 lead. After an exchange of punts, Green Bay drove 82 yards and scored on an 8-yard touchdown run by DuJuan Harris with 33 seconds left in the first quarter. Harris was initially ruled down at the 1, but the call was changed to a touchdown by Mike McCarthy's replay challenge.

In the second quarter, Green Bay quarterback Aaron Rodgers hit James Jones for 20 yards and Greg Jennings for 32 on a 72-yard drive that ended with a 20-yard field goal by Mason Crosby. After forcing a punt with under two minutes left in the half, Rodgers completed passes to Jordy Nelson for 22 yards, Jennings for 14, and Nelson again for 23 before fullback John Kuhn completed the drive with a 3-yard touchdown run, making the score 17–3 at halftime.

Green Bay scored another touchdown on their opening drive of the second half, moving the ball 80 yards in 12 plays and closing it out with Rodgers' 9-yard toss to Kuhn. Meanwhile, all that lay in store for the Vikings was three consecutive turnovers. First, they drove to the Packers 38-yard line, but then linebacker Clay Matthews forced a fumble while sacking Webb and recovered it. Then, following a punt, they drove to the Green Bay 46, only to lose the ball again on an interception by Sam Shields. The Vikings defense forced another punt early in the fourth quarter, but Sherels muffed the kick and Green Bay's Dezman Moses recovered the ball. Later on, another drive into Green Bay territory was ended with no points when the Vikings failed to convert a fourth down and four on the Packers 43-yard line.

Minnesota eventually managed to score a touchdown on a 50-yard pass from Webb to receiver Michael Jenkins. But by then, there was only 3:39 left in the game.

Rodgers completed 23 of 33 passes to ten different players for 274 yards and a touchdown. Harris was the team leader in rushing yards (47) and receptions (five for 53 yards). Matthews had four tackles, two sacks, a forced fumble, and a fumble recovery. Shields had seven tackles and an interception. Webb finished with 180 passing yards, with one touchdown and one interception, while also rushing for 68 yards. Vikings running back Adrian Peterson was the top rusher of the game with 99 rushing yards. He also caught a pass for eight yards. Jenkins had three receptions for 96 yards and a score. Webb completed only 11 of 30 passes with a touchdown and an interception in what was his last game as a quarterback; the Vikings converted him to a wide receiver for the 2013 season.

This was the second postseason meeting between the Vikings and Packers. Minnesota won the previous meeting at Lambeau 31–17 in the 2004 NFC Wild Card playoffs.

=== Sunday, January 6, 2013 ===
==== AFC: Baltimore Ravens 24, Indianapolis Colts 9 ====
Indianapolis Colts vs. Baltimore Ravens – Game summary

Quarter	1	2	3	4	Total
Colts	0	6	3	0	9
Ravens	0	10	7	7	24

at M&T Bank Stadium, Baltimore, Maryland

- Date: January 6
- Game time: 1:00 p.m. EST
- Game weather: 49 °F (9 °C), partly cloudy
- Game attendance: 71,379
- Referee: Mike Carey
- TV announcers (CBS): Jim Nantz (play-by-play) and Phil Simms (color commentator)
- Recap

Game information

1st Quarter

- None.

2nd Quarter

- BAL – Justin Tucker 23-yard field goal, 11:23. Ravens 3–0. Drive: 10 plays, 66 yards, 3:56.
- IND – Adam Vinatieri 47-yard field goal, 2:31. Tied 3–3. Drive: 10 plays, 51 yards, 5:44.
- BAL – Vonta Leach 2-yard run (Justin Tucker kick), 0:55. Ravens 10–3. Drive: 6 plays, 63 yards, 1:35.
- IND – Adam Vinatieri 52-yard field goal, 0:03. Ravens 10–6. Drive: 7 plays, 46 yards, 0:50.

3rd Quarter

- BAL – Dennis Pitta 20-yard pass from Joe Flacco (Justin Tucker kick), 8:26. Ravens 17–6. Drive: 5 plays, 75 yards, 1:23.
- IND – Adam Vinatieri 26-yard field goal, 0:40. Ravens 17–9. Drive: 15 plays, 72 yards, 7:46.

4th Quarter

- BAL – Anquan Boldin 18-yard pass from Joe Flacco (Justin Tucker kick), 9:14. Ravens 24–9. Drive: 5 plays, 70 yards, 2:30.

Leading passers

- IND – Andrew Luck – 28/54, 288 yards, 1 INT, 1 FUM
- BAL – Joe Flacco – 12/23, 282 yards, 2 TD

Leading rushers

- IND – Vick Ballard – 22 rushes, 91 yards
- BAL – Bernard Pierce – 13 rushes, 103 yards

Leading receivers

- IND – Reggie Wayne – 9 rec, 114 yards
- BAL – Anquan Boldin – 5 rec, 145 yards, 1 TD

Despite racking up 419 yards and 25 first downs, Indianapolis was unable to dent the end zone against a stingy Ravens defense, who recorded three sacks, forced two turnovers, and limited them to just four field goal attempts. Meanwhile, Baltimore's offense rolled up 441 yards and 24 points.

Both teams blew scoring chances in the first half. After forcing a punt on the opening drive (which Jacoby Jones returned 34 yards to the 48), Baltimore drove all the way to the Colts 11-yard line. But then defensive end Cory Redding stripped the ball from Ray Rice and Lawrence Guy recovered it for the Colts. Then Indy took over and drove to the Ravens 30, only to lose their own fumble when quarterback Andrew Luck was sacked by Paul Kruger and outside linebacker Pernell McPhee dove on the ball.

In the second quarter, a 22-yard reception by Ravens receiver Torrey Smith and an 18-yard run by rookie Bernard Pierce set up a 23-yard field goal by Justin Tucker. Following an exchange of punts, Luck completed 4/4 passes for 50 yards on a drive that ended with Adam Vinatieri's 47-yard field goal to tie the game. Jones responded with a 37-yard kickoff return. Four plays later, Rice caught a screen pass from Joe Flacco and ran it 47 yards to the Colts 2-yard line. On the next play, fullback Vonta Leach scored a 2-yard touchdown run to give the Ravens a 10–3 lead with 55 seconds left in the half. But Luck quickly led his team back, completing 4/5 passes for 62 yards to set up Vinatieri's 52-yard field goal, cutting the score to 10–6 at halftime. For Vinatieri, the NFL's all-time leader in postseason scoring, it was the longest playoff field goal of his career.

Midway through the third quarter, Flacco's 46-yard completion to Anquan Boldin moved the ball to the Colts 15-yard line. Following an incompletion and a false start penalty, he hit tight end Dennis Pitta for a 20-yard touchdown throw, increasing the lead to 17–6. Indianapolis responded with another drive deep into Ravens territory, but it was halted on the 8-yard line where Vinatieri kicked his third field goal of the game (and 48th postseason field goal of his career).

Early in the fourth quarter, Colts linebacker Pat Angerer recovered a fumble from Rice, leading to another drive into the Ravens red zone. But this time they came up empty when Vinatieri missed a field goal from 40 yards out. This was Vinatieri's first postseason miss against Baltimore. He had been 18/18 when playing against the Ravens up to this point.

The miss turned out to be devastating. Just two plays later, Pierce ran the ball 43 yards to the Colts 18-yard line, and then Flacco finished the drive with an 18-yard touchdown pass to Boldin, giving the team a 24–9 lead. Then their defense closed out the game by forcing two turnovers inside their own 40. First, they stopped the next drive when cornerback Cary Williams intercepted a pass from Luck on the Ravens 15-yard line and returned it 41 yards. Then, after a punt, Indianapolis turned the ball over on downs at the Baltimore 37 with 2:10 left in the game.

Flacco finished the game 12/23 for 282 yards and two touchdowns. Boldin caught five passes for a franchise playoff record 145 yards (all in the second half). Pierce rushed for 103 yards, while Rice had 70 rushing yards and a 47-yard catch. Jones returned four punts for 57 yards, two kickoffs for 60 yards, and caught an 8-yard pass. Ravens linebacker Ray Lewis, who returned for this game after missing most of the season with injuries and had recently announced his intention to retire after the postseason, finished with a team leading 13 tackles and a pass deflection. Kruger had four tackles and 2.5 sacks.

For the Colts, Luck finished his first playoff game completing 28 of 54 passes for 288 yards and an interception, while also rushing for 35 yards. Receiver Reggie Wayne caught nine passes for 114 yards.

This was the third postseason meeting between the Colts and Ravens. Indianapolis won the prior two meetings, the last being 20–3 in the 2009 AFC Divisional playoffs.

==== NFC: Seattle Seahawks 24, Washington Redskins 14 ====
Seattle Seahawks vs. Washington Redskins – Game summary

Quarter	1	2	3	4	Total
Seahawks	0	13	0	11	24
Redskins	14	0	0	0	14

at FedExField, Landover, Maryland

- Date: January 6
- Game time: 4:30 p.m. EST
- Game weather: 52 °F (11 °C), cloudy
- Game attendance: 84,325
- Referee: Pete Morelli
- TV announcers (Fox): Joe Buck (play-by-play), Troy Aikman (color commentator), Pam Oliver, and Erin Andrews (sideline reporters)
- Recap

Game information

1st Quarter

- WAS – Evan Royster 4-yard pass from Robert Griffin III (Kai Forbath kick), 10:15. Redskins 7–0. Drive: 9 plays, 80 yards, 5:03.
- WAS – Logan Paulsen 4-yard pass from Robert Griffin III (Kai Forbath kick), 2:31. Redskins 14–0. Drive: 11 plays, 54 yards, 5:58.

2nd Quarter

- SEA – Steven Hauschka 32-yard field goal, 12:03. Redskins 14–3. Drive: 12 plays, 66 yards, 5:21.
- SEA – Michael Robinson 4-yard pass from Russell Wilson (Steven Hauschka kick), 4:45. Redskins 14–10. Drive: 8 plays, 73 yards, 5:08.
- SEA – Steven Hauschka 29-yard field goal, 0:04. Redskins 14–13. Drive: 10 plays, 63 yards, 3:36.

3rd Quarter

- None.

4th Quarter

- SEA – Marshawn Lynch 27-yard run, 7:20 (2PT conversion good). Seahawks 21–14. Drive: 8 plays, 79 yards, 3:45.
- SEA – Steven Hauschka 22-yard field goal, 5:35. Seahawks 24–14. Drive: 4 plays, 1 yards, 0:47.

Leading passers

- SEA – Russell Wilson – 15/26, 187 yards, 1 TD
- WAS – Robert Griffin III – 10/19, 84 yards, 2 TD, 1 INT

Leading rushers

- SEA – Marshawn Lynch – 19 rushes, 131 yards 1 TD
- WAS – Alfred Morris – 16 rushes, 80 yards

Leading receivers

- SEA – Zach Miller – 4 rec, 48 yards
- WAS – Pierre Garçon – 4 rec, 50 yards

Seattle overcame a 14-point deficit in the first quarter to earn their first playoff win on the road since 1983. Seattle has now won three straight playoff games against Washington, who were playing in their first home playoff game since 1999. Coincidentally, the Seahawks also ended another playoff futility streak against the Redskins in the 2005 season (game played in 2006) when they beat them 20–10 at home in the divisional game for their first playoff victory at all (home or road) since 1984 on their way to their first Super Bowl appearance. Robert Griffin III faced off against Russell Wilson for the second such instance of both teams starting with rookie quarterbacks in the playoffs, in the Super Bowl era; after T. J. Yates and Andy Dalton had previously done so for the Houston Texans and the Cincinnati Bengals respectively, in the 2011–12 playoffs.

Washington stormed out of the gate with touchdowns on their first two drives. After receiving the opening kickoff, they drove 80 yards, featuring a 30-yard reception by Pierre Garçon and an 18-yard run by Alfred Morris. Griffin finished the drive with a 4-yard touchdown pass to reserve running back Evan Royster. Then the Redskins defense forced a three-and-out, and Richard Crawford gave them good field position with a 12-yard punt return to the 46-yard line. Washington subsequently moved the ball 54 yards and scored on Griffin's 4-yard toss to tight end Logan Paulsen. On the drive, Griffin, who was playing with a severely sprained lateral collateral ligament in one of his knees, further injured the joint. He remained in the game until the fourth quarter but was nowhere near 100% after the opening two Redskins' drives of the game.

But Seattle dominated the rest of the game, holding the Redskins to a final total of just 202 offensive yards. The Seahawks responded with a 66-yard drive, including a 19-yard scramble by Wilson, that ended on a field goal by Steven Hauschka. Following a punt, running back Marshawn Lynch's 20-yard gain on a fumble recovery set up their first touchdown of the game. Fullback Michael Robinson also made a big impact on the drive, catching a 19-yard pass from Wilson and capping the drive with a 4-yard touchdown catch. On the next possession, safety Earl Thomas intercepted a pass from Griffin on the Seattle 26-yard line. Wilson's subsequent completions to Doug Baldwin and Zach Miller for gains of 33 and 22 yards set up Hauschka's second field goal, cutting the score to 14–13 at the end of the half.

Seattle started the third quarter with a drive to the Redskins 1-yard line, but then Lynch lost a fumble that was recovered by Washington defensive end Jarvis Jenkins. In the fourth quarter, he managed to redeem himself with a 27-yard touchdown run. Then Wilson completed a pass to Miller for the two-point conversion, giving his team a 21–14 lead. Then, after the kickoff, Bruce Irvin sacked Griffin for a 12-yard loss. On the next play, Griffin fumbled the snap and as he went to try to recover it, he collapsed to the ground as he tore the already sprained LCL and the anterior cruciate ligament in the same knee. Seahawks defensive end Clinton McDonald recovered the ball on the Redskins 5-yard line, setting up Hauschka's third field goal to make the final score 24–14. Washington responded with a drive to the Seattle 20, but turned the ball over on downs with 1:08 left in the game.

Wilson finished his first playoff game 15/26 for 187 yards and a touchdown, along with 67 rushing yards. Lynch rushed for 132 yards and a touchdown, and caught a pass for nine yards. For the Redskins, safety Reed Doughty had 11 tackles and two sacks. Morris was their top rusher with 80 yards.

After the game, an MRI revealed Griffin suffered partial tears of his anterior cruciate and lateral collateral ligaments in his knee and had to undergo surgery to repair it. In response, Washington coach Mike Shanahan faced criticism for not pulling Griffin from the game earlier, despite warning signs he was playing injured.

This was the third postseason meeting between the Seahawks and Redskins. Seattle won both prior matchups, including the most recent being 35–14 in the 2007 NFC Wild Card playoffs.

== Divisional round ==
=== Saturday, January 12, 2013 ===
==== AFC: Baltimore Ravens 38, Denver Broncos 35 (2OT) ====
Baltimore Ravens vs. Denver Broncos – Game summary

Quarter	1	2	3	4	OT	2OT	Total
Ravens	14	7	7	7	0	3	38
Broncos	14	7	7	7	0	0	35

at Sports Authority Field at Mile High, Denver, Colorado

- Date: January 12
- Game time: 4:30 p.m. EST/2:30 p.m. MST
- Game weather: 13 °F (−11 °C), partly cloudy
- Game attendance: 76,732
- Referee: Bill Vinovich
- TV announcers (CBS): Greg Gumbel (play-by-play), Dan Dierdorf (color commentator), and Solomon Wilcots (sideline reporter)
- Recap

Game information

1st Quarter

- DEN – Trindon Holliday 90-yard punt return (Matt Prater kick), 12:32. Broncos 7–0. Drive: 1 play, 90 yards, 0:00.
- BAL – Torrey Smith 59-yard pass from Joe Flacco (Justin Tucker kick), 10:39. Tied 7–7. Drive: 4 plays, 94 yards, 1:43.
- BAL – Corey Graham 39-yard interception return (Justin Tucker kick), 9:58. Ravens 14–7. Drive: 3 plays, 4 yards, 0:42.
- DEN – Brandon Stokley 15-yard pass from Peyton Manning (Matt Prater kick), 4:09. Tied 14–14. Drive: 11 plays, 74 yards, 5:47.

2nd Quarter

- DEN – Knowshon Moreno 14-yard pass from Peyton Manning (Matt Prater kick), 7:32. Broncos 21–14. Drive: 8 plays, 86 yards, 3:35.
- BAL – Torrey Smith 32-yard pass from Joe Flacco (Justin Tucker kick), 0:43. Tied 21–21. Drive: 3 plays, 58 yards, 0:40.

3rd Quarter

- DEN – Trindon Holliday 104-yard kickoff return (Matt Prater kick), 15:00. Broncos 28–21. Drive: 1 play, 104 yards, 0:00.
- BAL – Ray Rice 1-yard run (Justin Tucker kick), 0:23. Tied 28–28. Drive: 5 plays, 37 yards, 2:27.

4th Quarter

- DEN – Demaryius Thomas 17-yard pass from Peyton Manning (Matt Prater kick), 7:18. Broncos 35–28. Drive: 10 plays, 88 yards, 4:58.
- BAL – Jacoby Jones 70-yard pass from Joe Flacco (Justin Tucker kick), 0:41. Tied 35–35. Drive: 3 plays, 77 yards, 0:38.

1st Overtime

- None.

2nd Overtime

- BAL – Justin Tucker 47-yard field goal, 13:24. Ravens 38–35. Drive: 6 plays, 16 yards, 2:33.

Leading passers

- BAL – Joe Flacco – 18/34, 331 yards, 3 TD
- DEN – Peyton Manning – 28/43, 290 yards, 3 TD, 2 INT

Leading rushers

- BAL – Ray Rice – 30 rushes, 131 yards, 1 TD
- DEN – Ronnie Hillman – 22 rushes, 83 yards

Leading receivers

- BAL – Torrey Smith – 3 rec, 98 yards, 2 TD
- DEN – Eric Decker – 6 rec, 84 yards

Baltimore cornerback Corey Graham's interception from Peyton Manning set up Justin Tucker's 47-yard game-winning field goal 1:42 into double overtime to stun the heavily favored Broncos. This brought Denver's 11-game winning streak to an end and sent the Ravens to their third AFC title game in the last five years. It was the sixth double overtime game in history, the first since 2003 (a game that coincidentally also featured head coach John Fox), and the fourth-longest game in NFL history at a total of 76:42 of game time. With the loss, the Broncos became the ninth #1 seed in the last eight years to lose their first playoff game.

Broncos receiver Trindon Holliday opened up the scoring by returning a Sam Koch punt 90 yards for a touchdown, the first postseason punt return score in franchise history. Things seemed to get even better for Denver when Jacoby Jones fumbled the ensuing kickoff and was downed on the 6-yard line. But two plays later, Tony Carter was hit with a 25-yard pass interference penalty on third down. Then Joe Flacco tied the game with a 59-yard touchdown pass to Torrey Smith. The situation only got worse for Denver on the next drive, as Graham picked off a deflected pass and returned it 39 yards for a touchdown, making the score 14–7. But Manning rallied his team back, completing 5/7 passes for 69 yards on a 74-yard drive that ended on his 15-yard touchdown pass to Brandon Stokley.

Later in the second quarter, a 32-yard reception by Broncos receiver Eric Decker set up Manning's 14-yard touchdown pass to Knowshon Moreno. Denver then forced a punt and drove to the Ravens 34-yard line, but this time they failed to score as Matt Prater missed a 52-field goal. Taking the ball back on their own 42 with 1:16 remaining, Flacco hit Anquan Boldin for 11 yards and tight end Dennis Pitta for 15 before finding Smith in the end zone on a 32-yard score, tying the score at 21 at the end of the half.

Holliday quickly broke the tie just 13 seconds into the third quarter by returning the second half kickoff 104 yards for a touchdown, making him the first player ever to return a punt and kickoff for a touchdown in a postseason game. Later in the quarter, Manning lost a fumble while being sacked by Pernell McPhee, and Ravens outside linebacker Paul Kruger recovered it on the Broncos 37-yard line. Running back Ray Rice took it to the end zone from there with five consecutive running plays (one of them for 32 yards), the last one a 1-yard touchdown run to tie the game back up at 28.

Midway through the fourth quarter, Denver drove 88 yards and scored on a 17-yard pass from Manning to Demaryius Thomas, taking a 35–28 lead with just over seven minutes left in regulation. Baltimore responded with a drive to the Broncos 31-yard line, but turned the ball over on downs with 3:16 left. The Ravens defense had to use all their timeouts on Denver's ensuing drive, but managed to force a punt and get the ball on their own 23-yard line at the 1:09 mark. After an incomplete pass and a 7-yard scramble, in the signature play of the game, Flacco tossed a 70-yard Hail Mary touchdown pass to Jones, sending the game into overtime. The last-second scoring play (and the game itself) was dubbed the "Mile High Miracle."

After the first three drives of overtime ended in punts, Graham intercepted a pass from Manning on the Broncos 45-yard line. On the last play of the first overtime period, Rice's 11-yard run moved the team into field goal range. A few plays later, Tucker kicked a 47-yard field goal to win the game.

Flacco threw for 331 yards and three touchdowns. Smith caught three passes for 98 yards and two scores. Rice rushed for 131 yards and a touchdown. Graham had eight tackles, two interceptions, and a touchdown. Linebacker Ray Lewis had 17 tackles, the most by any player in the postseason up to this point, while linebacker Terrell Suggs recorded 10 tackles and two sacks. For Denver, Manning completed 28 of 43 passes for 290 yards and three touchdowns, with two interceptions. Holliday's 90-yard punt return and 104-yard kickoff return were the longest ever in each NFL postseason category, though his record for the kickoff return touchdown lasted only a few weeks before being broken by Jones' 108-yard touchdown return in the Super Bowl. Holliday's 248 total special teams return yards were an NFL postseason record as well, breaking a record previously owned by Andre Coleman and Desmond Howard.

This was the second postseason meeting between the Ravens and Broncos. Baltimore won the last meeting 21–3 in the 2000 AFC Wild Card playoffs.

==== NFC: San Francisco 49ers 45, Green Bay Packers 31 ====
Green Bay Packers vs. San Francisco 49ers – Game summary

Quarter	1	2	3	4	Total
Packers	14	7	3	7	31
49ers	7	17	7	14	45

at Candlestick Park, San Francisco, California

- Date: January 12
- Game time: 8:00 p.m. EST/5:00 p.m. PST
- Game weather: 48 °F (9 °C), cloudy
- Game attendance: 69,732
- Referee: Jerome Boger
- TV announcers (Fox): Joe Buck (play-by-play), Troy Aikman (color commentator), Pam Oliver, and Erin Andrews (sideline reporters)
- Recap

Game information

1st Quarter

- GB – Sam Shields 52-yard interception return (Mason Crosby kick), 13:04. Packers 7–0. Drive: 4 plays, 19 yards, 2:12.
- SF – Colin Kaepernick 20-yard run (David Akers kick), 9:09. Tied 7–7. Drive: 8 plays, 80 yards, 3:47.
- GB – DuJuan Harris 18-yard run (Mason Crosby kick), 0:29. Packers 14–7. Drive: 7 plays, 80 yards, 2:43.

2nd Quarter

- SF – Michael Crabtree 12-yard pass from Colin Kaepernick (David Akers kick), 11:04. Tied 14–14. Drive: 3 plays, 9 yards, 0:44.
- SF – Michael Crabtree 20-yard pass from Colin Kaepernick (David Akers kick), 5:33. 49ers 21–14. Drive: 8 plays, 48 yards, 3:53.
- GB – James Jones 20-yard pass from Aaron Rodgers (Mason Crosby kick), 2:39. Tied 21–21. Drive: 6 plays, 80 yards, 2:53.
- SF – David Akers 36-yard field goal, 0:03. 49ers 24–21. Drive: 11 plays, 62 yards, 2:33.

3rd Quarter

- GB – Mason Crosby 31-yard field goal, 8:38. Tied 24–24. Drive: 9 plays, 76 yards, 3:31.
- SF – Colin Kaepernick 56-yard run (David Akers kick), 7:16. 49ers 31–24. Drive: 3 plays, 80 yards, 1:18.

4th Quarter

- SF – Frank Gore 2-yard run (David Akers kick), 15:00. 49ers 38–24. Drive: 8 plays, 93 yards, 5:03.
- SF – Anthony Dixon 2-yard run (David Akers kick), 3:42. 49ers 45–24. Drive: 11 plays, 93 yards, 7:54.
- GB – Greg Jennings 3-yard pass from Aaron Rodgers (Mason Crosby kick), 1:07. 49ers 45–31. Drive: 11 plays, 77 yards, 2:37.

Leading passers

- GB – Aaron Rodgers – 26/39, 257 yards, 2 TD, 1 INT
- SF – Colin Kaepernick – 17/31, 263 yards, 2 TD, 1 INT

Leading rushers

- GB – DuJuan Harris – 11 rushes, 53 yards, 1 TD
- SF – Colin Kaepernick – 16 rushes, 181 yards, 2 TD

Leading receivers

- GB – James Jones – 4 rec, 87 yards, 1 TD
- SF – Michael Crabtree – 9 rec, 119 yards, 2 TD

In his first career playoff game, 25-year-old 49ers quarterback Colin Kaepernick rushed for 181 yards and two touchdowns, setting both the NFL single-game record for rushing yards by a quarterback and the 49ers postseason record for rushing, regardless of position. He also passed for 263 yards and two scores. Overall, San Francisco racked up 579 yards, including a franchise record 323 rushing yards, and scored a touchdown in every quarter to earn their second consecutive trip to the NFC Championship Game.

However, Kaepernick didn't get off to a good start. Less than two minutes into the game, he threw a pass that was intercepted by Sam Shields and returned 52 yards for a touchdown. But he quickly rallied his team back, completing a 45-yard pass to running back Frank Gore before taking the ball into the end zone himself on a 20-yard run. Later in the quarter, Green Bay took a 14–7 lead with Aaron Rodgers' 44-yard completion to James Jones setting up an 18-yard touchdown run by DuJuan Harris. The Packers then forced a punt, but returner Jeremy Ross muffed the kick and C. J. Spillman recovered it for San Francisco on the Packers 9-yard line. Two plays later, Kaepernick tied the score at 14 with a 12-yard touchdown pass to Michael Crabtree. Then Tarell Brown intercepted a pass from Rodgers, setting up Kaepernick's second touchdown pass to Crabtree, this one from 20 yards out.

With 2:39 left in the half, Rodgers' 20-yard touchdown pass to Jones tied the score at 21. But on the 49ers next drive, a pair of runs by Kaepernick for gains of 19 and 17 yards enabled David Akers to kick a 36-yard field goal, sending the teams into their locker rooms with San Francisco leading 24–21.

In the third quarter, Green Bay drove 76 yards in nine plays, featuring a 30-yard reception by Greg Jennings and scored a Mason Crosby field goal. But the tie turned out to be short lived. On the third play of their next drive, Kaepernick faked a handoff, rolled right, and took off for at the time his career long 56-yard touchdown run, retaking the lead at 31–24. Then, after a punt, he completed a 44-yard pass to tight end Vernon Davis, setting up Gore's 2-yard touchdown run on the first play of the fourth quarter. Following another punt, Kaepernick led the 49ers back for more points, this time on a 93-yard drive. First he ran for a 16-yard gain, and later he completed a 17-yard throw to tight end Delanie Walker. On the next play, Gore's 26-yard burst moved the ball to the Packers 27-yard line. Anthony Dixon eventually finished the 11-play drive with a 2-yard touchdown run, making the score 45–24.

With under a minute left, Rodgers threw a 3-yard touchdown pass to Jennings. But any hope of a miracle comeback was dashed when Walker recovered the ensuing onside kick attempt.

Crabtree was the top receiver of the game, with nine catches for 119 yards and two touchdowns. Gore rushed for 119 yards and a touchdown, while also catching two passes for 48 yards. Linebacker Patrick Willis had seven tackles and a sack. Rodgers completed 26 of 39 passes for 257 yards, two touchdowns, and an interception, while also rushing for 28 yards. Kaepernick finished the game responsible for more yards gained (444) then the entire Packers team (352)

This was the final playoff game at Candlestick Park.

This was the sixth postseason meeting between the Packers and 49ers. Green Bay had won four of the five prior meetings, including winning 25–15 in the 2001 NFC Wild Card playoffs.

=== Sunday, January 13, 2013 ===
==== NFC: Atlanta Falcons 30, Seattle Seahawks 28 ====
Seattle Seahawks vs. Atlanta Falcons – Game summary

Quarter	1	2	3	4	Total
Seahawks	0	0	7	21	28
Falcons	10	10	7	3	30

at Georgia Dome, Atlanta, Georgia

- Date: January 13
- Game time: 1:00 p.m. EST
- Game weather: Played indoors, domed stadium
- Game attendance: 70,366
- Referee: Walt Coleman
- TV announcers (Fox): Thom Brennaman (play-by-play), Brian Billick (color commentator), Laura Okmin, and Chris Myers (sideline reporters)
- Recap

Game information

1st Quarter

- ATL – Matt Bryant 39-yard field goal, 9:44. Falcons 3–0. Drive: 11 plays, 54 yards, 5:20.
- ATL – Tony Gonzalez 1-yard pass from Matt Ryan (Matt Bryant kick), 3:10. Falcons 10–0. Drive: 8 plays, 61 yards, 2:41.

2nd Quarter

- ATL – Matt Bryant 37-yard field goal, 9:17. Falcons 13–0. Drive: 11 plays, 68 yards, 6:18.
- ATL – Roddy White 47-yard pass from Matt Ryan (Matt Bryant kick), 4:16. Falcons 20–0. Drive: 3 plays, 88 yards, 1:17.

3rd Quarter

- SEA – Golden Tate 29-yard pass from Russell Wilson (Ryan Longwell kick), 9:53. Falcons 20–7. Drive: 9 plays, 80 yards, 5:13.
- ATL – Jason Snelling 5-yard pass from Matt Ryan (Matt Bryant kick), 2:11. Falcons 27–7. Drive: 14 plays, 80 yards, 7:36.

4th Quarter

- SEA – Russell Wilson 1-yard run (Ryan Longwell kick), 13:06. Falcons 27–14. Drive: 8 plays, 80 yards, 4:10.
- SEA – Zach Miller 3-yard pass from Russell Wilson (Ryan Longwell kick), 9:19. Falcons 27–21. Drive: 4 plays, 62 yards, 1:50.
- SEA – Marshawn Lynch 2-yard run (Ryan Longwell kick), 0:34. Seahawks 28–27. Drive: 7 plays, 61 yards, 2:26.
- ATL – Matt Bryant 49-yard field goal, 0:13. Falcons 30–28. Drive: 3 plays, 41 yards, 0:23.

Leading passers

- SEA – Russell Wilson – 24/36, 385 yards, 2 TD, 1 INT
- ATL – Matt Ryan – 24/35, 250 yards, 3 TD, 2 INT

Leading rushers

- SEA – Russell Wilson – 7 rushes, 60 yards, 1 TD
- ATL – Michael Turner – 14 rushes, 98 yards

Leading receivers

- SEA – Zach Miller – 8 rec, 142 yards, 1 TD
- ATL – Roddy White – 5 rec, 76 yards, 1 TD

The Falcons built up a 20–0 first-half lead, but had to overcome a furious Seattle comeback to earn their first trip to the conference championship game since 2005. Trailing 28–27 with 25 seconds left, Falcons quarterback Matt Ryan's completions to Harry Douglas and Tony Gonzalez moved the ball 41 yards in just 12 seconds of game time to set up Matt Bryant's 49-yard game-winning field goal. For Gonzalez, the NFL's all-time leader among tight ends in nearly every receiving category, it marked the first playoff win in his 16-season career.

Atlanta scored on their opening drive, moving the ball 55 yards on the way to a 39-yard field goal from Bryant. Later in the quarter, Seattle got a scoring opportunity when linebacker Bobby Wagner intercepted a Ryan pass and returned it to the Falcons' 33-yard line. But running back Marshawn Lynch fumbled the ball while being tackled by Sean Weatherspoon and defensive tackle Jonathan Babineaux recovered it. On Atlanta's ensuring drive, a pair of 16-yard receptions by Roddy White and tight end Chase Coffman set up Ryan's 1-yard touchdown pass to Gonzalez.

On the last play of the first quarter, Atlanta running back Jacquizz Rodgers ran the ball 45 yards to the Seahawks 42-yard line. Atlanta then continued on to the 19-yard line, where Bryant kicked a 37-yard field goal. Seattle responded with a drive to the Atlanta 11-yard line, but turned the ball over when fullback Michael Robinson was dropped for a 1-yard loss by safety William Moore on fourth down and one. With Atlanta taking the ball back on their own 12, Michael Turner made a 33-yard run before Ryan's 47-yard touchdown pass to White increased their lead to 20–0. Seattle responded with a drive to the Falcons' 11-yard line on a drive that used up all their timeouts. With 17 seconds left in the half, they attempted one last play before sending in the field goal unit, but quarterback Russell Wilson was sacked by Babineaux and the clock ran out before they could run another play.

Seattle started out the second half with an 80-yard touchdown drive, with Wilson rushing for 19 yards and completing a 19-yard throw to tight end Zach Miller before tossing a 29-yard touchdown pass to Golden Tate. Atlanta countered with an 80-yard drive of their own, featuring a 21-yard reception by Julio Jones and scoring on Ryan's 5-yard pass to fullback Jason Snelling. But it wasn't long before Seattle completed the third consecutive 80-yard possession; Wilson hit Tate for 24 yards, rushed for 12, and then completed a 26-yard pass to Miller on the Falcons 13-yard line. A few plays later, he took it into the end zone himself on a 1-yard run, making the score 27–14 with 13:06 left in regulation.

Three plays into Atlanta's next drive, safety Earl Thomas intercepted a pass from Ryan at the Seattle 38. Wilson then moved the ball into the Falcons red zone with a 24-yard completion to Sidney Rice and a 30-yarder to reserve running back Robert Turbin. On the next play, his 3-yard touchdown pass to Miller cut the deficit down to one score, 27–21.

With three minutes left in the game, Seattle's Leon Washington returned a punt 15 yards to his 39-yard line. Then Wilson went back to work, with completions to Tate and Lynch for gains of 19 and 24 yards. Then, with 31 seconds left, Lynch's 2-yard touchdown run gave them their first lead of the game, 28–27.

Rodgers returned the ensuing kickoff 34 yards to the 28-yard line, giving the Falcons the ball with 25 seconds and two timeouts left. On their first play, Ryan completed a 22-yard pass to Douglas near the left sideline, running six seconds off the clock. Then he found Gonzalez over the middle for a 19-yard gain to the Seattle 31-yard line that used up six more seconds before the clock was stopped on their final timeout. With 13 seconds left in the game, Atlanta decided to try the game-winning field goal on their next play. Shortly before the ball was snapped, Seahawks coach Pete Carroll called a timeout, giving Bryant a "practice kick" on the field, which he missed. But after the timeout, Bryant's 49-yard field goal kick was good, retaking the lead for Atlanta with eight seconds left on the clock.

However, Seattle was not quite out of the game. Taking the ball on their 46-yard line after Atlanta's squib kick, Wilson's 6-yard completion to Doug Baldwin moved the ball to the Atlanta 48, where he went out of bounds with two seconds left. Rather than attempt a 65-yard field goal (which was two yards longer than the NFL record for longest field goal at that time), Seattle decided to try a Hail Mary pass with their final play. Wilson heaved the ball into the end zone, but Jones, who had been brought in as an extra defensive back, intercepted the pass to seal the victory.

Ryan completed 24 of 35 passes for 250 yards and three touchdowns, with two interceptions. Turner rushed for 98 yards. Rodgers rushed for 64 yards, and added 104 more on five kickoff returns. Wilson threw for 385 yards and two touchdowns with one interception, while also rushing for 60 yards and another score. Miller was the top receiver of the game with eight receptions for 142 yards and a touchdown, while Tate added six catches for 103 yards and a touchdown. Wagner had eight tackles and an interception.

This was the first postseason meeting between the Seahawks and Falcons.

==== AFC: New England Patriots 41, Houston Texans 28 ====
Houston Texans vs. New England Patriots – Game summary

Quarter	1	2	3	4	Total
Texans	3	10	0	15	28
Patriots	7	10	14	10	41

at Gillette Stadium, Foxborough, Massachusetts

- Date: January 13
- Game time: 4:30 p.m. EST
- Game weather: 51 °F (11 °C), cloudy and mild
- Game attendance: 68,756
- Referee: Tony Corrente
- TV announcers (CBS): Jim Nantz (play-by-play), Phil Simms (color commentator), and Steve Tasker (sideline reporter)
- Recap

Game information

1st Quarter

- HOU – Shayne Graham 27-yard field goal, 14:00. Texans 3–0. Drive: 4 plays, 3 yards, 1:00.
- NE – Shane Vereen 1-yard run (Stephen Gostkowski kick), 1:31. Patriots 7–3. Drive: 6 plays, 65 yards, 3:01.

2nd Quarter

- NE – Stephen Gostkowski 37-yard field goal, 10:20. Patriots 10–3. Drive: 11 plays, 65 yards, 3:51.
- NE – Shane Vereen 8-yard pass from Tom Brady (Stephen Gostkowski kick), 3:43. Patriots 17–3. Drive: 7 plays, 80 yards, 2:56.
- HOU – Arian Foster 1-yard run (Shayne Graham kick), 1:20. Patriots 17–10. Drive: 5 plays, 47 yards, 2:23.
- HOU – Shayne Graham 55-yard field goal, 0:02. Patriots 17–13. Drive: 5 plays, 25 yards, 0:24.

3rd Quarter

- NE – Stevan Ridley 8-yard run (Stephen Gostkowski kick), 11:34. Patriots 24–13. Drive: 7 plays, 69 yards, 3:30.
- NE – Brandon Lloyd 5-yard pass from Tom Brady (Stephen Gostkowski kick), 1:25. Patriots 31–13. Drive: 6 plays, 63 yards, 2:53.

4th Quarter

- NE – Shane Vereen 33-yard pass from Tom Brady (Stephen Gostkowski kick), 13:13. Patriots 38–13. Drive: 1 play, 33 yards, 0:00.
- HOU – DeVier Posey 25-yard pass from Matt Schaub (Shayne Graham kick), 11:42. Patriots 38–20. Drive: 5 plays, 37 yards, 1:32.
- HOU – Arian Foster 1-yard pass from Matt Schaub (2PT conversion good), 5:15. Patriots 38–28. Drive: 11 plays, 79 yards, 4:47.
- NE – Stephen Gostkowski 38-yard field goal, 1:18. Patriots 41–28. Drive: 9 plays, 27 yards, 3:57.

Leading passers

- HOU – Matt Schaub – 34/51, 343 yards, 2 TD, 1 INT
- NE – Tom Brady – 25/40, 344 yards, 3 TD

Leading rushers

- HOU – Arian Foster – 22 rushes, 90 yards, 1 TD
- NE – Stevan Ridley – 15 rushes, 82 yards, 1 TD

Leading receivers

- HOU – Andre Johnson – 8 rec, 95 yards
- NE – Wes Welker – 8 rec, 131 yards

In Week 14 of the regular season, New England defeated Houston 42–14. This time around, the Texans managed to keep the score tighter, but the final result didn't change. New England quarterback Tom Brady passed for 344 yards and three touchdowns as he led the team to their seventh AFC Championship Game in his 12 years as a starter. This was also his 17th postseason win, surpassing the NFL's all-time record held by Joe Montana. However, the win did come with a price: Patriots tight end Rob Gronkowski, who suffered a season ending arm injury.

Houston started out with a huge burst of momentum when Danieal Manning returned the opening kickoff 94 yards to the New England 12-yard line. But a dropped pass by James Casey and an overthrown pass in the end zone forced them to settle for a 27-yard field goal from Shayne Graham. Later in the quarter, Brady completed three consecutive passes for 51 yards on a 65-yard drive on the way to a 1-yard touchdown run by Shane Vereen.

On their next drive, a 30-yard completion to Wes Welker, along with Vereen's 22-yard run and 12-yard reception, set up a 37-yard field goal by Stephen Gostkowski. Following a punt, Brady completed a 47-yard pass to Welker, moving the ball to the Texans 8-yard line. On the next play, he threw a touchdown pass to Vereen, making the score 17–3. On the ensuing kickoff, a 35-yard return by Manning and a 15-yard penalty against Gostkowski for a horse collar tackle gave Houston the ball at the Patriots 47-yard line. Arian Foster took the ball to the end zone from there with five consecutive running plays, the last a 1-yard touchdown run. Then after forcing a punt, quarterback Matt Schaub completed three passes for 25 yards in a span of just 22 seconds, moving the ball to the Pats 37 where Graham made a 55-yard field goal as time expired in the half and cutting the score to 17–13.

However, New England dominated the second half with 21 unanswered points. On the first drive of the second half, Brady's 40-yard completion to tight end Aaron Hernandez set up Stevan Ridley's 8-yard touchdown run. Later in the quarter, Patriots linebacker Rob Ninkovich intercepted a pass and returned it to the 37-yard line. Ridley then rushed four times for 37 yards on a 63-yard drive that ended with Brady's 5-yard touchdown completion to Brandon Lloyd. Early in the fourth quarter, Houston failed to convert a fourth down and one on their own 33-yard line, and Brady threw a 33-yard touchdown pass to Vereen on the next play.

Now trailing 38–13, Houston made one last comeback attempt. Manning's 65-yard kickoff return gave them the ball on the Pats 37-yard line, where they scored on a five play drive that ended with Schaub's 25-yard touchdown pass to receiver DeVier Posey. Then after a punt, they drove 79 yards, including a 24-yard catch by tight end Owen Daniels and scored on Schaub's 1-yard completion to Foster. On the next play, he completed a 2-point conversion pass to Andre Johnson, making the score 38–28 with 5:11 left in the game. But New England ended their comeback chances when Ninkovich recovered their onside kick attempt, leading to Gostkowski's 38-yard field goal to put the game away.

Vereen finished with 124 all-purpose yards and three touchdowns. Welker caught eight passes for 131 yards. For the Texans, Schaub threw for 352 yards, two touchdowns, and an interception. Foster rushed for 90 yards, caught seven passes for 63 yards, and scored two touchdowns. Johnson caught eight passes for 95 yards. Manning returned four kickoffs for 216 yards, the third highest total in postseason history.

This was the first postseason meeting between the Texans and Patriots.

== Conference championships ==
=== Sunday, January 20, 2013 ===
==== NFC: San Francisco 49ers 28, Atlanta Falcons 24 ====
San Francisco 49ers vs. Atlanta Falcons – Game summary

Quarter	1	2	3	4	Total
49ers	0	14	7	7	28
Falcons	10	14	0	0	24

at Georgia Dome, Atlanta, Georgia

- Date: January 20
- Game time: 3:00 p.m. EST
- Game weather: Played indoors, domed stadium
- Game attendance: 70,863
- Referee: Terry McAulay
- TV announcers (Fox): Joe Buck (play-by-play), Troy Aikman (color commentator), Pam Oliver, and Erin Andrews (sideline reporters)
- Recap

Game information

1st Quarter

- ATL – Julio Jones 46-yard pass from Matt Ryan (Matt Bryant kick), 11:24. Falcons 7–0. Drive: 7 plays, 80 yards, 3:36.
- ATL – Matt Bryant 35-yard field goal, 3:20. Falcons 10–0. Drive: 6 plays, 65 yards, 3:01.

2nd Quarter

- ATL – Julio Jones 20-yard pass from Matt Ryan (Matt Bryant kick), 14:54. Falcons 17–0. Drive: 4 plays, 57 yards, 1:49.
- SF – LaMichael James 15-yard run (David Akers kick), 8:08. Falcons 17–7. Drive: 11 plays, 80 yards, 6:46.
- SF – Vernon Davis 4-yard pass from Colin Kaepernick (David Akers kick), 1:55. Falcons 17–14. Drive: 7 plays, 82 yards, 4:29.
- ATL – Tony Gonzalez 10-yard pass from Matt Ryan. (Matt Bryant kick), 0:25. Falcons 24–14. Drive: 7 plays, 80 yards. 1:31.

3rd Quarter

- SF – Frank Gore 5-yard run (David Akers kick), 10:47. Falcons 24–21. Drive: 7 plays, 82 yards, 4:00.

4th Quarter

- SF – Frank Gore 9-yard run (David Akers kick), 8:23. 49ers 28–24. Drive: 6 plays, 38 yards, 3:18.

Leading passers

- SF – Colin Kaepernick – 16/21, 233 yards, 1 TD
- ATL – Matt Ryan – 30/42, 396 yards, 3 TD, 1 INT

Leading rushers

- SF – Frank Gore – 21 rushes, 90 yards, 2 TD
- ATL – Jacquizz Rodgers – 10 rushes, 32 yards

Leading receivers

- SF – Vernon Davis — 5 rec, 106 yards, 1 TD
- ATL – Julio Jones – 11 rec, 182 yards, 2 TD

San Francisco overcame a 17-point deficit, the largest comeback ever in an NFC Championship game, to earn their sixth Super Bowl appearance in franchise history. It was their first road playoff win in 24 years. Ironically, the previous biggest comeback in NFC Championship history was the Falcons overcoming a 13-point deficit in the 1998 NFC title game. This marked the seventh year in a row where the NFC Champion came from the division that faced the AFC East in the regular season.

Atlanta dominated the first quarter, mainly on plays by receiver Julio Jones, who caught five passes for 100 yards, including a 46-yard touchdown catch on their opening drive, and a 27-yard reception on their next drive to set up a Matt Bryant field goal. Following a punt, Matt Ryan hit Roddy White for a 23-yard gain on the last play of the first quarter. Then he threw a 20-yard touchdown pass to Jones on the first play of the second, giving the Falcons a 17–0 lead.

This time San Francisco struck back with an 80-yard scoring drive, with Frank Gore rushing for 20 yards and Vernon Davis catching a pass for 27. LaMichael James finished the drive with a 15-yard touchdown run. Then, after forcing a three and out, Colin Kaepernick rushed for 23 yards and completed three passes to Davis for 48 yards, the last a 4-yard touchdown pass to make the score 17–14. But Atlanta stormed back as Ryan completed five passes for double-digit gains on their next drive, the last one a 10-yard score to tight end Tony Gonzalez with 25 seconds left in the half.

The 49ers took the opening kickoff and drove 82 yards, with Kaepernick completing two passes to Randy Moss for 38 yards and one to tight end Delanie Walker for 20. Gore completed the drive with a 5-yard touchdown run, cutting their deficit to 24–21. On Atlanta's ensuing possession, cornerback Chris Culliver gave San Francisco a great chance to tie or take the lead by intercepting a pass from Ryan and returning it to the Falcons 25-yard line. But San Francisco failed to gain a first down and came up empty when David Akers hit the uprights on a 38-yard field goal try. Later on, the 49ers got another scoring opportunity when outside linebacker Aldon Smith recovered a fumble from Ryan on his own 40-yard line. They subsequently drove deep into Falcons territory, but once again they failed to score when Dunta Robinson stripped the ball from Michael Crabtree on the 1-yard line as he tried to get in for the go-ahead score, and linebacker Stephen Nicholas recovered it.

With 12 minutes left in regulation, Ted Ginn Jr.'s 20-yard punt return gave San Francisco the ball on the Falcons 38-yard line. Five plays later, Gore scored his second touchdown on a 9-yard run, giving the 49ers their first lead of the game at 28–24. Atlanta responded with a drive to the 49ers 13-yard line, but consecutive incompletions on third and fourth down caused a turnover on downs with just 1:13 left in the game.

Atlanta managed to force a punt and get the ball with 13 seconds to go. Ryan completed a pass to Jones on the final play, but he was tackled at the 49ers 35-yard line as time expired.

Kaepernick completed 16 of 21 passes for 233 yards and a touchdown, along with 21 rushing yards. Davis caught five passes for 106 yards and a score. Gore rushed for 90 yards and two touchdowns. Ryan completed 30 of 42 passes for 396 yards and three touchdowns, with one interception. Jones caught 11 passes for 182 yards and two touchdowns, while White had seven receptions for 100 yards. Gonzalez caught eight passes for 78 yards and a score.

This was the second postseason meeting between the 49ers and Falcons. Atlanta won the only prior meeting 20–18 in the 1998 NFC Divisional playoffs.

==== AFC: Baltimore Ravens 28, New England Patriots 13 ====
Baltimore Ravens vs. New England Patriots – Game summary

Quarter	1	2	3	4	Total
Ravens	0	7	7	14	28
Patriots	3	10	0	0	13

at Gillette Stadium, Foxborough, Massachusetts

- Date: January 20
- Game time: 6:30 p.m. EST
- Game weather: 41 °F (5 °C), clear and windy
- Game attendance: 68,756
- Referee: Bill Leavy
- TV announcers (CBS): Jim Nantz (play-by-play), Phil Simms (color commentator), Steve Tasker, and Solomon Wilcots (sideline reporters)
- Recap

Game information

1st Quarter

- NE – Stephen Gostkowski 31-yard field goal, 6:21. Patriots 3–0. Drive: 13 plays, 67 yards, 5:08.

2nd Quarter

- BAL – Ray Rice 2-yard run (Justin Tucker kick), 9:28. Ravens 7–3. Drive: 13 plays, 90 yards, 5:51.
- NE – Wes Welker 1-yard pass from Tom Brady (Stephen Gostkowski kick), 4:18. Patriots 10–7. Drive: 11 plays, 79 yards, 5:04.
- NE – Stephen Gostkowski 25-yard field goal, 0:00. Patriots 13–7. Drive: 9 plays, 36 yards, 2:32.

3rd Quarter

- BAL – Dennis Pitta 5-yard pass from Joe Flacco (Justin Tucker kick), 6:14. Ravens 14–13. Drive: 10 plays, 72 yards, 2:49.

4th Quarter

- BAL – Anquan Boldin 3-yard pass from Joe Flacco (Justin Tucker kick), 14:56. Ravens 21–13. Drive: 10 plays, 63 yards, 4:50.
- BAL – Anquan Boldin 11-yard pass from Joe Flacco (Justin Tucker kick), 11:13. Ravens 28–13. Drive: 4 plays, 47 yards, 1:33.

Leading passers

- BAL – Joe Flacco – 21/36, 240 yards, 3 TD
- NE – Tom Brady – 29/54, 320 yards, 1 TD, 2 INT

Leading rushers

- BAL – Bernard Pierce – 9 rushes, 52 yards
- NE – Stevan Ridley – 18 rushes, 70 yards

Leading receivers

- BAL – Torrey Smith — 4 rec, 69 yards
- NE – Wes Welker – 8 rec, 117 yards, 1 TD

Baltimore's defense forced three turnovers, held Tom Brady and the New England Patriots to 13 points, and kept them scoreless in the second half en route to their first Super Bowl in 12 years, covering over their previous year's AFC title loss. The Patriots suffered their worst loss of the season and their lowest scoring total of the season despite six trips inside the Ravens 25-yard line. Brady suffered his first career loss at home when leading by halftime, in which during that span he was 67–0.

In the first quarter, New England receiver Brandon Lloyd caught two passes for 29 yards on a drive that ended with a Stephen Gostkowski field goal. In the second quarter, Ravens quarterback Joe Flacco completed 5/6 passes for 64 yards on an 87-yard drive that ended with Ray Rice's 2-yard touchdown run to take the lead. New England struck back with a 79-yard touchdown drive. The key player on it was Wes Welker, who caught a 24-yard pass and later finished it with a 1-yard touchdown reception from Brady. Baltimore was forced to punt after three plays on their next drive, and Welker returned the ball 15 yards to the Ravens 43-yard line. New England then drove to the 7-yard line where Gostkowski kicked his second field goal as time expired in the half, giving the Patriots a 13–7 halftime lead.

In the second half, New England managed several drives deep into Ravens territory, but were unable to convert any into points. First, they drove to Baltimore's 34-yard line, but were halted there and decided to punt rather than attempt a 52-yard field goal. Tight end Dennis Pitta subsequently caught three passes for 32 yards on Baltimore's ensuring 87-yard drive, the last a 5-yard touchdown catch. New England was quickly forced to punt and Jacoby Jones returned it 11 yards to the 37. Baltimore then drove 63 yards, featuring a 23-yard reception by Torrey Smith and scored on Flacco's 3-yard touchdown pass to Anquan Boldin on the first play of the fourth quarter.

The Ravens dominated the final quarter, forcing a turnover on every New England drive. First, Pats running back Stevan Ridley lost a fumble while being tackled by Bernard Pollard and defensive end Arthur Jones recovered it on the New England 47-yard line. Three plays later, Flacco threw an 11-yard touchdown pass to Boldin, making the score 28–13. The Patriots then drove to the Ravens 19-yard line, only to turn the ball over on downs after failing to convert a fourth down and 4. Following a punt, New England moved the ball back to the Ravens 19, only to lose it again when Brady threw a pass that was tipped by Pernell McPhee at the line of scrimmage and intercepted by Dannell Ellerbe. After another Ravens punt, Cary Williams put the game away by intercepting a pass from Brady in the end zone with 1:13 left in regulation.

Flacco threw for 240 yards and three touchdowns. Linebacker Ray Lewis had 14 tackles, giving him a staggering 44 total tackles in the Ravens three playoff games. Brady threw for 320 yards and one touchdown with two interceptions. Welker caught eight passes for 117 yards and a touchdown, while also returning four punts for 56 yards. Pats linebacker Brandon Spikes had 11 tackles.

The Ravens became the first team to win the AFC Championship on the road since the 2005 Pittsburgh Steelers and were the last road team to win a conference championship game until the Los Angeles Rams and New England Patriots won their respective conference championship games in 2018. It would also ultimately be the last time the Patriots would lose a home playoff game until they lost a game in the wild card round of the 2019 season to the Tennessee Titans, which would ultimately be Tom Brady's final game with the team.

This was the second consecutive postseason meeting and third overall between the Ravens and Patriots. Both teams split the prior two meetings, with New England winning the 2011 AFC Championship Game 23–20.

== Super Bowl XLVII: Baltimore Ravens 34, San Francisco 49ers 31 ==
Super Bowl XLVII – Baltimore Ravens vs. San Francisco 49ers – Game summary

Quarter	1	2	3	4	Total
Ravens (AFC)	7	14	7	6	34
49ers (NFC)	3	3	17	8	31

at Mercedes-Benz Superdome, New Orleans, Louisiana

- Date: February 3
- Game time: 6:30 p.m. EST/5:30 p.m. CST
- Game weather: Played indoors (dome stadium)
- Game attendance: 71,024
- Referee: Jerome Boger
- TV announcers (CBS): Jim Nantz (play-by-play), Phil Simms (color commentator), Steve Tasker, and Solomon Wilcots (sideline reporters)
- Recap

Game information

1st Quarter

- BAL - Anquan Boldin 13-yard pass from Joe Flacco (Justin Tucker kick), 10:36. Ravens 7-0. Drive: 6 plays, 51 yards, 2:29.
- SF - David Akers 36-yard field goal, 3:58. Ravens 7-3. Drive: 12 plays, 62 yards, 6:38.

2nd Quarter

- BAL - Dennis Pitta 1-yard pass from Joe Flacco (Justin Tucker kick), 7:10. Ravens 14-3. Drive: 10 plays, 75 yards, 4:43.
- BAL - Jacoby Jones 56-yard pass from Joe Flacco (Justin Tucker kick), 1:45. Ravens 21-3. Drive: 3 plays, 56 yards, 0:22.
- SF - David Akers 27-yard field goal, 0:00. Ravens 21-6. Drive: 8 plays, 71 yards, 1:45.

3rd Quarter

- BAL - Jacoby Jones 108-yard kickoff return (Justin Tucker kick), 14:49. Ravens 28-6. Drive: 0 plays, 0 yards, 0:11.
- SF - Michael Crabtree 31-yard pass from Colin Kaepernick (David Akers kick), 7:20. Ravens 28-13. Drive: 7 plays, 80 yards, 3:06.
- SF - Frank Gore 6-yard run (David Akers kick), 4:59. Ravens 28-20. Drive: 2 plays, 20 yards, 0:48.
- SF - David Akers 34-yard field goal, 3:10. Ravens 28-23. Drive: 4 plays, 8 yards, 1:00.

4th Quarter

- BAL - Justin Tucker 19-yard field goal, 12:54. Ravens 31-23. Drive: 12 plays, 71 yards, 5:16.
- SF - Colin Kaepernick 15-yard run (pass failed), 9:57. Ravens 31-29. Drive: 5 plays, 76 yards, 2:57.
- BAL - Justin Tucker 38-yard field goal, 4:19. Ravens 34-29. Drive: 10 plays, 59 yards, 5:38.
- SF - Safety, Sam Koch ran out of bounds in end zone, 0:04. Ravens 34-31.

Leading passers

- BAL - Joe Flacco – 22/33, 287 yards, 3 TD
- SF - Colin Kaepernick – 16/28, 302 yards, TD, INT

Leading rushers

- BAL - Ray Rice – 20 carries, 59 yards
- SF - Frank Gore – 19 carries, 110 yards, TD

Leading receivers

- BAL - Anquan Boldin – 6 receptions, 104 yards, TD
- SF - Michael Crabtree – 5 receptions, 109 yards, TD

Although this game was looking to be a blowout win for the Ravens after a 21-6 first half lead, the 49ers rallied to keep it close, but the game came down to the Ravens hanging on to a 5 point lead in the final seconds and intentionally giving up a safety for the resulting final score. This was the third Super Bowl in five years, after XLIII and XLV, to not feature either #1 seed from either conference.

This was the first Super Bowl meeting between the Ravens and 49ers.
