= Huey Whittaker =

American football player (born 1981)

No. 17, 15
- Positions: Wide receiver, linebacker

Personal information
- Born: June 19, 1981 (age 45); Spring Hill, Florida, U.S.
- Listed height: 6 ft 5 in (1.96 m)
- Listed weight: 215 lb (98 kg)

Career information
- High school: Springstead (Spring Hill)
- College: South Florida
- NFL draft: 2004: undrafted

Career history
- Pittsburgh Steelers (2004)*; Tampa Bay Buccaneers (2004)*; Jacksonville Jaguars (2004–2005)*; Frankfurt Galaxy (2005); Tampa Bay Storm (2006–2007); Utah Blaze (2008); New York Jets (2009)*; Spokane Shock (2010); Florida Tuskers (2010); Tampa Bay Storm (2011); Virginia Destroyers (2011–2012); San Jose SaberCats (2011–2014)
- * Offseason or practice squad member only

Awards and highlights
- UFL champion (2011); ArenaBowl champion (2010); ArenaBowl Ironman Of The Game (2010); First-team All-Arena (2010); 2× Second-team All-Arena (2008, 2013)

Career AFL statistics
- Receptions: 569
- Receiving yards: 6,541
- Receiving touchdowns: 148
- Total tackles: 115
- Interceptions: 6
- Stats at ArenaFan.com

Hubert Alton George Whittaker (born June 19, 1981) is an American former professional football player who was a wide receiver and linebacker in the Arena Football League (AFL). He was signed by the Pittsburgh Steelers as an undrafted free agent in 2004. He played college football at South Florida.

== Early life ==
Whittaker attended Frank W. Springstead High School in Spring Hill, Florida, where he was named a St. Petersburg Times All-Suncoast selection as a senior with 10 receiving touchdowns.

== College career ==
Whittaker attended Hudson Valley Community College before transferring to the University of South Florida.

== Professional career ==
=== New York Jets ===
Whittaker was signed to a future contract by the New York Jets on January 2, 2009. He was waived on August 12 when the team signed placekicker Parker Douglass. He was re-signed on August 16 only to be waived again on August 30.

=== Spokane Shock ===
Whittaker was a starting wide receiver for the Spokane Shock in 2010.

=== Florida Tuskers ===
Whittaker was signed by the Florida Tuskers of the United Football League on August 26, 2010.
