= Matt Breida =

American football player (born 1995)

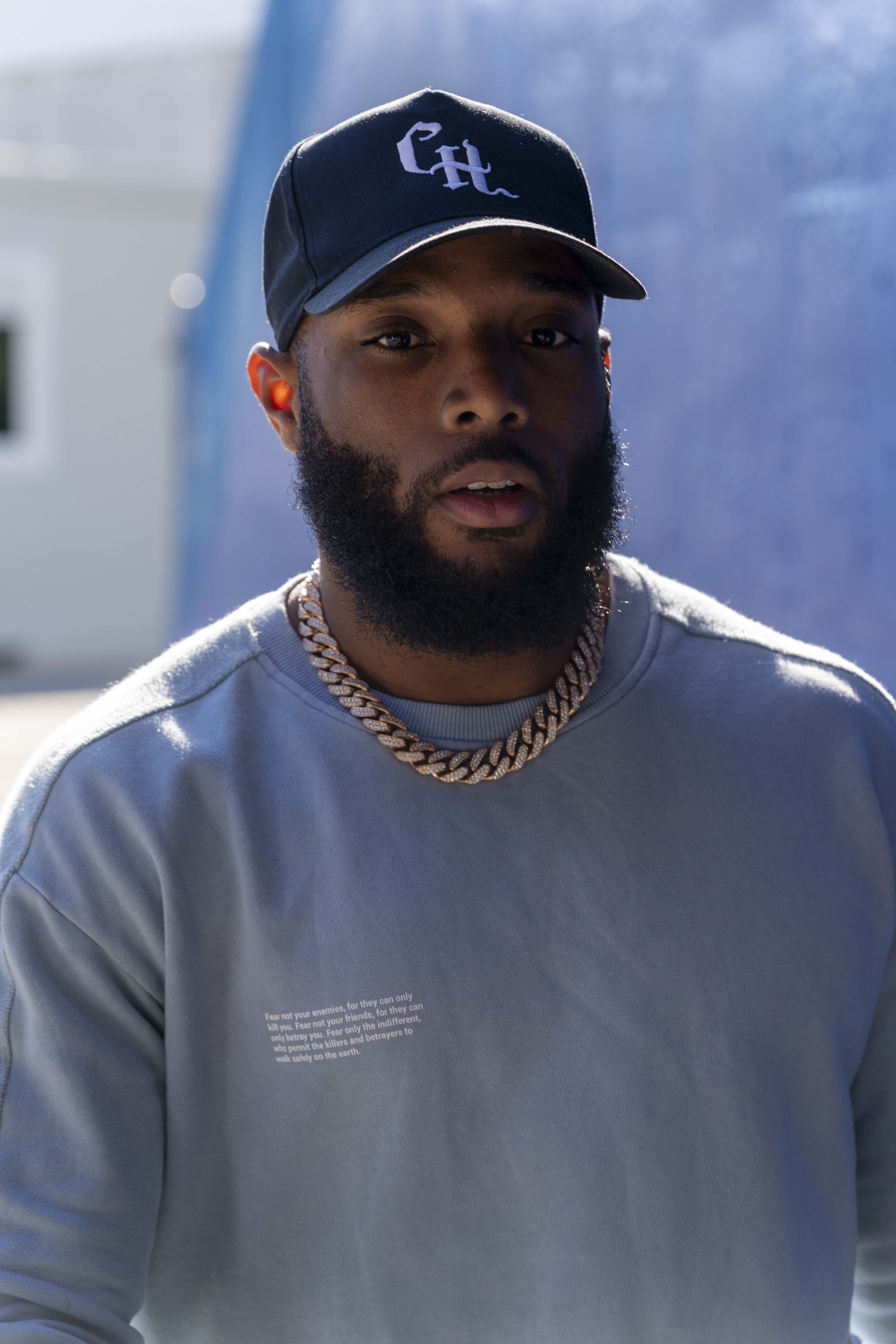
- Breida in 2021

No. 22, 31
- Position: Running back

Personal information
- Born: February 28, 1995 (age 31); Brandon, Florida, U.S.
- Listed height: 5 ft 10 in (1.78 m)
- Listed weight: 195 lb (88 kg)

Career information
- High school: Nature Coast Technical (Brooksville, Florida)
- College: Georgia Southern (2013–2016)
- NFL draft: 2017: undrafted

Career history
- San Francisco 49ers (2017–2019); Miami Dolphins (2020); Buffalo Bills (2021); New York Giants (2022–2023); San Francisco 49ers (2024)*
- * Offseason or practice squad member only

Awards and highlights
- 2× First-team All-Sun Belt (2014, 2015)

Career NFL statistics
- Rushing yards: 2,652
- Rushing average: 4.6
- Rushing touchdowns: 9
- Receptions: 120
- Receiving yards: 935
- Receiving touchdowns: 6
- Stats at Pro Football Reference

Matthew John Breida (born February 28, 1995) is an American former professional football player who was a running back for seven seasons in the National Football League (NFL). He played college football for the Georgia Southern Eagles and signed with the 49ers as an undrafted free agent in 2017. Breida also played for the Miami Dolphins, Buffalo Bills, and New York Giants.

== Early life ==
Breida's adoptive parents moved the family from Hudson, Florida, to Spring Hill, north of Tampa. There, Breida attended Nature Coast Technical High School in nearby Brooksville, Florida, where he played high school football for the Sharks.

== College career ==
Breida played college football for the Eagles at Georgia Southern University. As a sophomore in 2014, he rushed for a Sun Belt Conference-leading 1,485 yards (second most by a GSU sophomore to Adrian Peterson) and 17 touchdowns on 171 carries, along with eight receptions for 97 yards and a touchdown. This included a career-best 210 yards against Navy on November 15.

As a junior in 2015, Breida improved to 1,609 yards (second in the conference to Larry Rose III) and a conference-leading 17 touchdowns on 203 carries.

As a senior in 2016, Breida's statistics declined to 646 rushing yards and three touchdowns on 168 carries, along with 11 receptions for 53 yards and two touchdowns. This significant decrease in output was not due to injury, but at least partially due to first-time head coach Tyson Summers' unsuccessful move from a triple option offense. Breida's 8.7 and 7.9 yards per carry his sophomore and junior years are the two best in school history, and despite only two productive years, he finished sixth in school history in total rushing yards.

== Professional career ==
=== Pre-draft ===
Pre-draft measurables
Height	Weight	Arm length	Hand span	Wingspan	40-yard dash	10-yard split	20-yard split	20-yard shuttle	Three-cone drill	Vertical jump	Broad jump	Bench press
5 ft 9 1/4 in (1.76 m)	195 lb (88 kg)	32 1/8 in (0.82 m)	9 5/8 in (0.24 m)	6 ft 2 in (1.88 m)	4.38 s	1.53 s	2.50 s	4.34 s	6.85 s	42 in (1.07 m)	11 ft 2 in (3.40 m)	23 reps
All values from Pro Day

Due to his disappointing senior year, Breida was not invited to the NFL Combine. However, he performed well at his pro day, running a 4.38 40-yard dash, recording a 42-inch vertical jump and an 11-Foot-2 broad jump, and completing 23 reps on the bench press test.

=== San Francisco 49ers (first stint) ===
==== 2017 season ====
Breida signed with the San Francisco 49ers, one of numerous undrafted free agents, on May 4, 2017.

Breida entered the season as the backup to Carlos Hyde in the 49ers' backfield. On September 10, 2017, in his NFL debut, Breida had four rushes for 11 yards in the season-opening 23–3 loss to the Carolina Panthers. During a Week 8 33–10 road loss to the Philadelphia Eagles, he had 17 rushing yards to go along with 39 receiving yards and his first NFL touchdown on a 21-yard reception from quarterback C. J. Beathard. Two weeks later against the New York Giants, Breida had nine carries for 55 yards and his first rushing touchdown in the 31–21 victory. During a Week 16 44–33 victory over the Jacksonville Jaguars, Breida had 11 carries for a season-high 74 yards and a 30-yard rushing touchdown. In the regular-season finale against the Los Angeles Rams, he had 12 carries for 72 yards and a 32-yard reception during the 34–13 road victory.

Breida finished his rookie season with 105 carries for 465 yards and two touchdowns to go along with 21 receptions for 180 yards and a touchdown in 16 games and no starts. This was third on the 6–10 team in yards-from-scrimmage, and 14th among NFL rookies.

==== 2018 season ====
Breida entered the season expecting to back up newly signed free agent Jerick McKinnon, but McKinnon tore his ACL prior to the start of the season, thrusting Breida to compete for the starting role with Alfred Morris.

Breida began the season as backup to Morris, but out-gained the veteran with 46 yards in the season-opening 24–16 road loss to the Minnesota Vikings. Breida started for the first time in his career during Week 2 against the Detroit Lions, and finished the 30–27 victory with a career-high 138 rushing yards (which also led the NFL in Week 2) and a touchdown. His 66-yard touchdown in the third quarter was second only to Colin Kaepernick's 90-yarder in 2014 for the longest run by a 49er since 2009. Frequently hampered by minor injuries, Breida split carries with veterans Morris and Raheem Mostert. Although he had 90 yards the following week against the Kansas City Chiefs, Breida averaged 11 carries for just 43 yards over the next six games, losing the NFL lead in yards per attempt to the Lions' Kerryon Johnson and the Cleveland Browns Nick Chubb in Week 8.

Breida rebounded with a 17-carry, 101-yard performance during a Week 10 27–23 loss to the Giants on Monday Night Football, and in his return to the Tampa area two weeks later, Breida recorded 106 yards on 14 carries to move back to second in the NFL (behind Green Bay's Aaron Jones) with 5.8 yards-per-carry, and added 34 receiving yards. During a Week 13 43–16 road loss to the Seattle Seahawks, Breida had three receptions for 51 yards, but only five rushes for six yards before suffering an ankle injury, and missed the next game against the Denver Broncos. He returned the following week in the second divisional game against the Seahawks, and recorded 96 yards-from-scrimmage during the 26–23 overtime victory. During a Week 16 14–9 loss to the Chicago Bears, Breida had just four carries for 20 yards before again suffering an ankle injury, which placed him on injured reserve for the rest of the season.

Despite numerous health problems, Breida led the injury-plagued 4–12 49ers with 153 carries for 814 yards and three touchdowns, finishing second on the team only to NFL-record-setter George Kittle with 1,075 scrimmage yards. Breida's 5.3 yards per attempt was fourth among qualified NFL rushers.

==== 2019 season ====
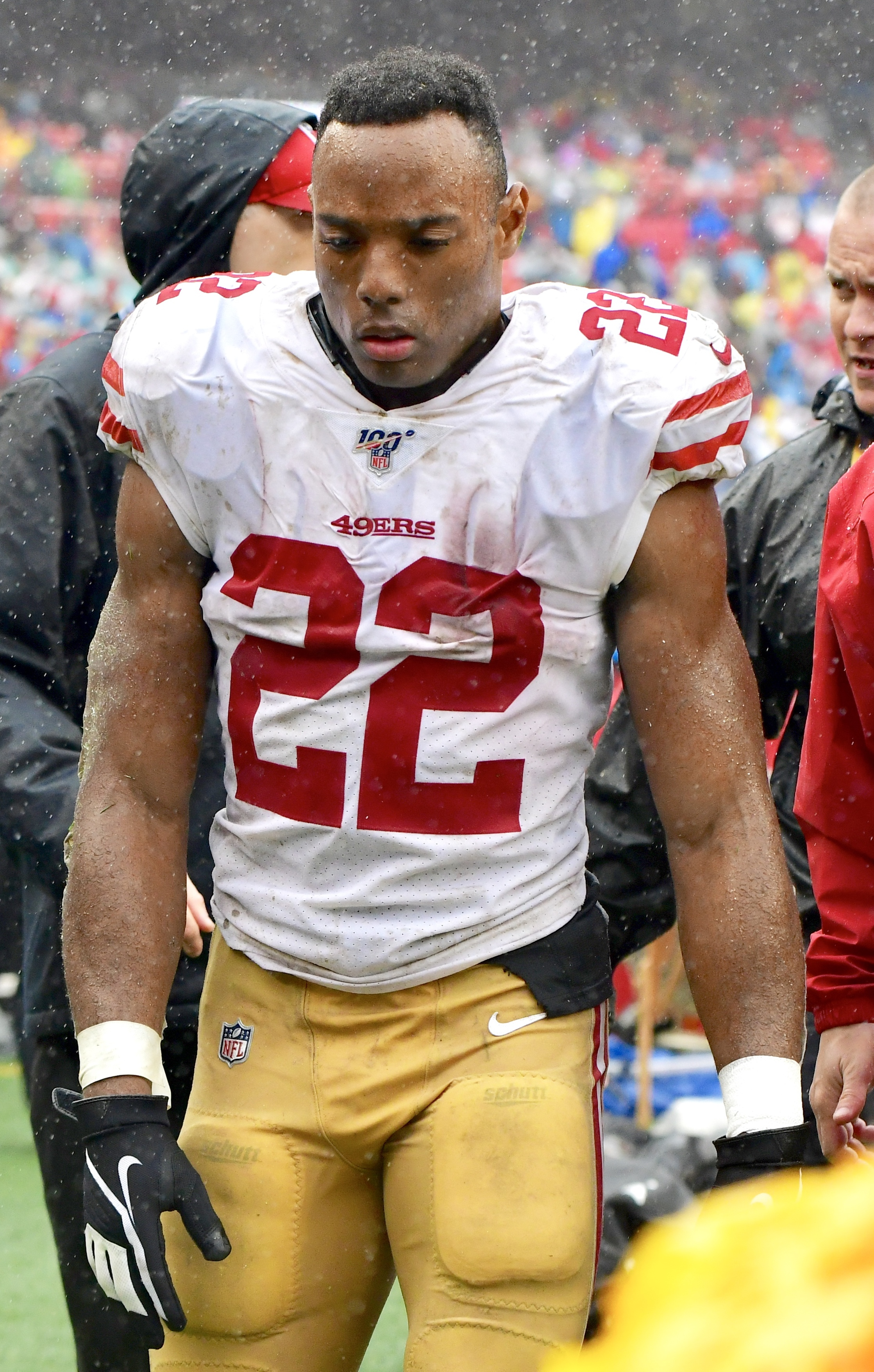
Breida in 2019

With continued complications in McKinnon's recovery, Breida entered the season as a co-starter with free agent acquisition Tevin Coleman.

During a Week 2 41–17 road victory over the Cincinnati Bengals, Breida had 12 carries for 121 yards. After a Week 4 bye, he rushed 11 times for 114 yards and an 83-yard touchdown and caught three passes for 15 yards and a touchdown in a 31–3 victory over the Browns on Monday Night Football. Breida reached 22.30 mph on the 83-yard touchdown run, the fastest speed reached by a ball carrier on any play since the start of the previous season, making him responsible for two of the top three fastest speeds reached in that span (22.30 mph and 22.09 mph respectively). Breida was used less frequently as the season progressed as Raheem Mostert took over the second-string role.

Breida finished the 2019 season with 123 carries for 623 yards and a touchdown to go along with 19 receptions for 120 yards and a touchdown in 13 games and five starts. He was fifth in the NFL with 5.1 yards per carry, his third consecutive season in the top 10. Despite not seeing much playing time in the playoffs, Breida and the 49ers reached Super Bowl LIV but were defeated by the Chiefs 31–20.

On March 17, 2020, the 49ers placed a second-round restricted free agent tender on Breida. He signed the contract on April 16.

=== Miami Dolphins ===
On April 25, 2020, during the 2020 NFL draft, Breida was traded to the Miami Dolphins for a fifth-round pick, which the 49ers used to select West Virginia offensive lineman Colton McKivitz.

Breida was placed on the reserve/COVID-19 list by the Dolphins on December 4, and was activated on December 16. He finished the 2020 season with 59 carries for 254 yards and nine receptions for 96 yards in 12 games and one start.

=== Buffalo Bills ===
On March 29, 2021, Breida signed a one-year contract with the Buffalo Bills. Sparingly used due to the presence of running backs Zack Moss and Devin Singletary, Breida scored his first touchdowns with the Bills in Week 10 against the New York Jets. Playing mainly on special teams with just eight offensive snaps, he finished the 45–17 victory with three carries for 28 yards and a touchdown to go along with three receptions for 22 yards and a touchdown, but also lost a fumble.

Breida finished the 2021 season with 26 carries for 125 yards and a touchdown to go along with seven receptions for 72 yards and two touchdowns in nine games and no starts.

=== New York Giants ===
==== 2022 season ====
On March 21, 2022, Breida signed a one-year contract with the New York Giants.

Being used as the backup to Saquon Barkley, Breida scored his only touchdown of the regular season during a Week 10 31–18 loss to the Detroit Lions. Receiving an uptick in snaps compared to the previous season, Breida had 54 carries for 220 yards and a touchdown to go along with 20 receptions for 118 yards in 17 games and one start. In the two postseason games he played, Breida had seven carries for 31 yards and a touchdown to go along with a 19-yard reception.

==== 2023 season ====
On March 14, 2023, the Giants re-signed Breida to a one-year contract. He played in all 17 games and started in four of them due to Barkley being out with injury and recorded 55 carries for 151 yards and a touchdown to go along with 17 receptions for 88 yards in 17 games and four starts.

=== San Francisco 49ers (second stint) ===
On August 5, 2024, Breida re-signed with the 49ers. He was released on August 26.

=== Retirement ===
On August 14, 2025, Breida announced his intentions to retire from the NFL.

== Career statistics ==
=== NFL ===
==== Regular season ====
Year	Team	Games		Rushing					Receiving					Fumbles	
Year	Team	GP	GS	Att	Yds	Avg	Lng	TD	Rec	Yds	Avg	Lng	TD	Fum	Lost
2017	SF	16	0	105	465	4.4	33T	2	21	180	8.6	32	1	1	0
2018	SF	14	13	153	814	5.3	66T	3	27	261	9.7	26	2	1	1
2019	SF	13	5	123	623	5.1	83T	1	19	120	6.3	17	1	2	1
2020	MIA	12	1	59	254	4.3	24	0	9	96	10.7	31	0	2	1
2021	BUF	9	0	26	125	4.8	28	1	7	72	10.3	23	2	1	1
2022	NYG	17	1	54	220	4.1	18	1	20	118	5.9	16	0	0	0
2023	NYG	17	4	55	151	2.8	9	1	17	88	5.2	22	0	0	0
Career		98	24	575	2,652	4.6	83T	9	120	935	7.8	32	6	7	4

==== Postseason ====
Year	Team	Games		Rushing					Receiving					Fumbles	
Year	Team	GP	GS	Att	Yds	Avg	Lng	TD	Rec	Yds	Avg	Lng	TD	Fum	Lost
2019	SF	3	1	9	19	2.1	6	0	0	0	0.0	0	0	1	1
2022	NYG	2	0	7	31	4.4	8	1	1	19	19.0	19	0	0	0
Career		5	1	16	50	3.1	8	1	1	19	19	19	0	1	1

=== College ===
Year	Team	GP	Rushing				Receiving			
Year	Team	GP	Att	Yds	Avg	TD	Rec	Yds	Avg	TD
2014	Georgia Southern	12	171	1,485	8.7	17	8	97	12.1	1
2015	Georgia Southern	13	203	1,609	7.9	17	3	6	2.0	0
2016	Georgia Southern	12	168	646	3.8	3	11	53	4.8	2
Career		37	542	3,740	6.9	37	22	156	7.1	3

== Personal life ==
Breida was adopted by Terri and Mike Breida on March 2, 1995. They later adopted a second child, Josh. The couple were independently disabled by chronic health problems and car accidents in 2006 and 2003, respectively.

During his time at Georgia Southern, Breida volunteered as a reader and speaker at elementary schools in two states, which contributed to his nomination as a Senior Class Award finalist and Honor Roll member.
