= Hernando County School Board =

School district in Florida, United States

Hernando County School District is a government school district headquartered in Brooksville, Florida, United States. The district covers Hernando County.

== History ==
In the COVID-19 pandemic in Florida, the district enacted having teachers work at schools while students take lessons from home via internet, with at-school teachers teaching the lessons.

== Schools ==
As of the 2017–2018 school year, there are 28 schools in the Hernando County School District: 10 elementary schools, 4 middle schools, 3 K-8 schools, 5 high schools, 2 educational centers, 1 eSchool and 3 charter schools.

=== Elementary schools ===
- Brooksville Elementary School (Leopard)
- Chocachatti Elementary School (Seminole)
- Deltona Elementary School (Dove)
- Eastside Elementary School (Leopard)
- Moton Elementary School (Leopard)
- Pine Grove Elementary School (Bear)
- Spring Hill Elementary School (Panther)
- Suncoast Elementary School (Manatee)
- Westside Elementary School (Tiger)
- John D. Floyd Elementary School (Dolphin)

=== Middle schools ===
- Dolores S. Parrott Middle School (Leopard)
- Fox Chapel Middle School (Tiger)
- Powell Middle School (Panther)
- West Hernando Middle School (Bear)

=== K-8 Schools ===
- Challenger K-8 (Navigator)
- Explorer K-8 (2007) (Bobcat)
- Winding Waters K-8 (Hornet)

=== High schools ===
- Hernando High School (Leopard) (1889)
- Frank W. Springstead High School (Eagle) (1976)
- Central High School (Bear) (1988)
- Nature Coast Technical High School (Shark) (2003)
- Weeki Wachee High School (Hornet) (2010)

=== Charter schools ===
- Brooksville Engineering, Science and Technology(BEST) Academy
- Gulf Coast Academy of Science and Technology
- Gulf Coast Elementary School

=== Other centers ===
- Endeavor and Discovery Academies
- Hernando eSchool
- Springs Coast Environmental Center
