= Central High School (Brooksville, Florida) =

School in Brooksville, Florida, US

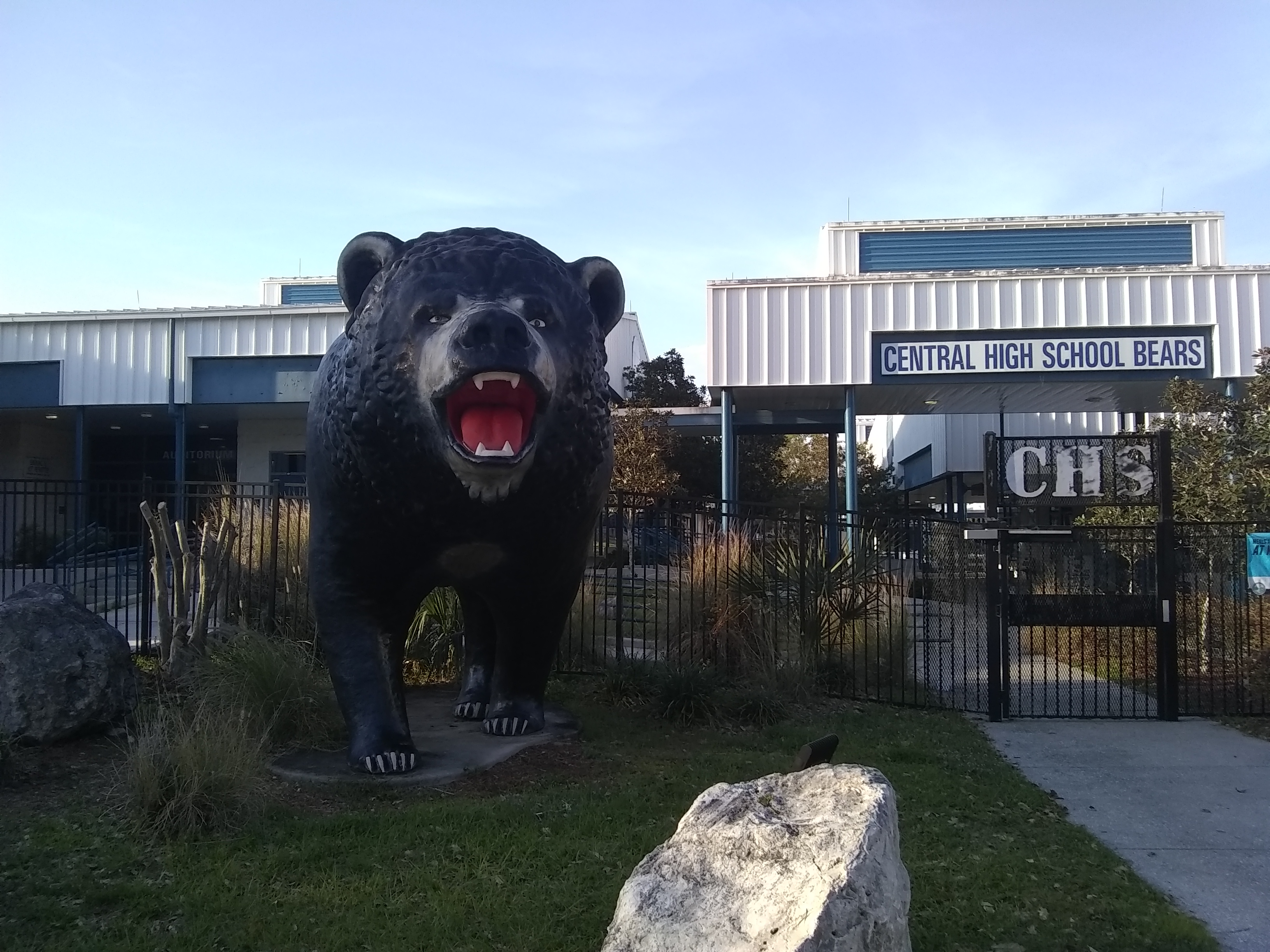

Location
- 14075 Ken Austin Pkwy; Brooksville, Florida 34613; United States; 28.5641667°N 82.4955556°W

Information
- School type: Public Secondary
- Motto: "Cultivating integrity, intelligence, and inspiration today to empower students to embrace the challenge of tomorrow."
- Opened: 1988
- School district: Hernando County School Board
- Superintendent: Ray Pinder
- Principal: Kelly Slusser
- Teaching staff: 79.00 (on an FTE basis)
- Grades: 9–12
- Gender: Co-Ed
- Enrollment: 1,452 (2023–2024)
- Average class size: In 2011, Central High School had teacher to student ratio of 1:18.
- Student to teacher ratio: 18.38
- Campus: Suburban
- Colours: Navy; Silver green
- Mascot: Bear
- Website: chs.hernandoschools.org

Central High School, or CHS, is a public four-year high school located at 14075 Ken Austin Parkway in Brooksville, Florida, United States, which is north of Tampa. The school currently has 1,610 students enrolled as of 2013. The school offers several Advanced Placement courses from the College Board and AICE courses from the University of Cambridge in England.

Like other high schools in Hernando County, Central High School offers dual enrollment courses with nearby colleges and universities. Students can take college level coursework from the University of Florida, University of South Florida, and Pasco-Hernando Community College.

== Notable people ==
- Alex Ruoff (2005), basketball player and coach
- Andy Leavine (2006 - transferred), professional wrestler
- DuJuan Harris (2007), American football running back
