= Nature Coast Technical High School =

Location
- 4057 California Street, Brooksville, Florida, 34604; United States
- 28.48826°N 82.4634°W

Information
- Type: Magnet school
- Established: 2003
- School district: Hernando County School District
- Principal: Toni-Ann Noyes (2009-present)
- Staff: 62.00 (FTE)
- Grades: 9-12
- Enrollment: 1,346 (2023–2024)
- Student to teacher ratio: 21.71
- Colors: Columbia Blue; Black
- Mascot: Sharks
- Website: ncth.hernandoschools.org

Nature Coast Technical High School (also known as NCTHS) is a magnet school located in Brooksville, Florida. It opened for its first year in the fall of 2003. The high school offers a specialized set of programs, called "clusters" for students to choose from. Students are required to participate in their cluster program for three years, and some offer an optional fourth year. They are currently offering clusters in Digital Video Production, Information Technology, Culinary Arts, Engineering, Criminal Justice, Allied Health, Automotive Maintenance, Aerospace Technology, Commercial and Performing Arts, and Energy Technician. Although they have previously offered programs in construction, law, and cosmetology. In the school's twenty year history, there have only been two principals: Margret “Tizzy” Schoelles and Toni Ann Noyes.

Most recently there has been news that the school will become a fully zoned school for the upcoming fall 2024 school year. Upon this news it has been said the school will be phasing out the cluster programs, which the school has been centered on for the past twenty years.

== Academics ==
The school is required to follow the statutes issued by the state regarding class and credit requirements for students. They offer a variety of Advanced Placement (AP) courses and Dual enrollment (DE) classes through Pasco-Hernando State College. AP courses are offered in person and students can choose to take DE courses online, in person at NCT's campus or in person at any of the PHSC campuses.

=== Clusters ===
There are a total of 11 clusters students can choose from during their first year. Each cluster is typically taught by one faculty member.

==== Digital Video Production ====
Students have the opportunity to earn certifications in Adobe Premiere Pro and Adobe Photoshop.

A typical class period includes finding a group to create a film project with, writing a script, and going around campus to film your project. This cluster typically requires a good amount of outside work done at home to succeed.

Students that excel in this course will have the opportunity to submit their projects to film festivals and participate in the awards ceremonies. The cluster program also hosts its own film festival called the "Brucy's" which is held at the Beacon Cinemas. Students who have created the most notable works will have their films featured and receive an award.

== Athletics ==
Nature Coast Technical High School is affiliated with the Florida High School Athletic Association and is a member of the Gulf Coast 8 Conference. They currently offer an array of boys, and girls, varsity and junior varsity sports. Their current athletics teams are:

=== Boys' sports ===
Baseball – Class 4A – Region R2 – District D7

Basketball – Class 4A – Region R2 – District D8

Cross country – Class 2A – Region R3 – District D5

Football – Class 3A – Region R2 – District D9

Golf – Class 2A – Region R2 – District D7

Soccer – Class 4A – Region R2 – District D6

Swimming – Class 2A – Region R2 – District D4

Tennis – Class 2A – Region R3 – District D6

Track & field – Class 2A – Region R3 – District D9

Weightlifting – Class 2A – Region R3 – District D10

Wrestling – Class 1A – Region R2 – District D6

=== Girls' sports ===
Basketball – Class 4A – Region R2 – District D8

Competitive cheerleading – Class Independent – Region Independent – District Independent

Cross country – Class 2A – Region R3 – District D5

Golf – Class 2A – Region R2 – District D7

Soccer – Class 4A – Region R2 – District D6

Softball – Class 4A – Region R3 – District D9

Swimming – Class 2A – Region R2 – District D4

Tennis – Class 2A – Region R3 – District D6

Track & field – Class 2A – Region R3 – District D9

Volleyball – Class 4A – Region R2 – District D6

Weightlifting – Class 2A – Region R3 – District D9

Wrestling - Class 1A - Region R2 - District D8

== Notable alumni ==
=== Athletes ===
- Matt Breida, NFL running back for the New York Giants

== See also ==
- Suncoast Technical Education Center
