= DuJuan Harris =

American football player (born 1988)

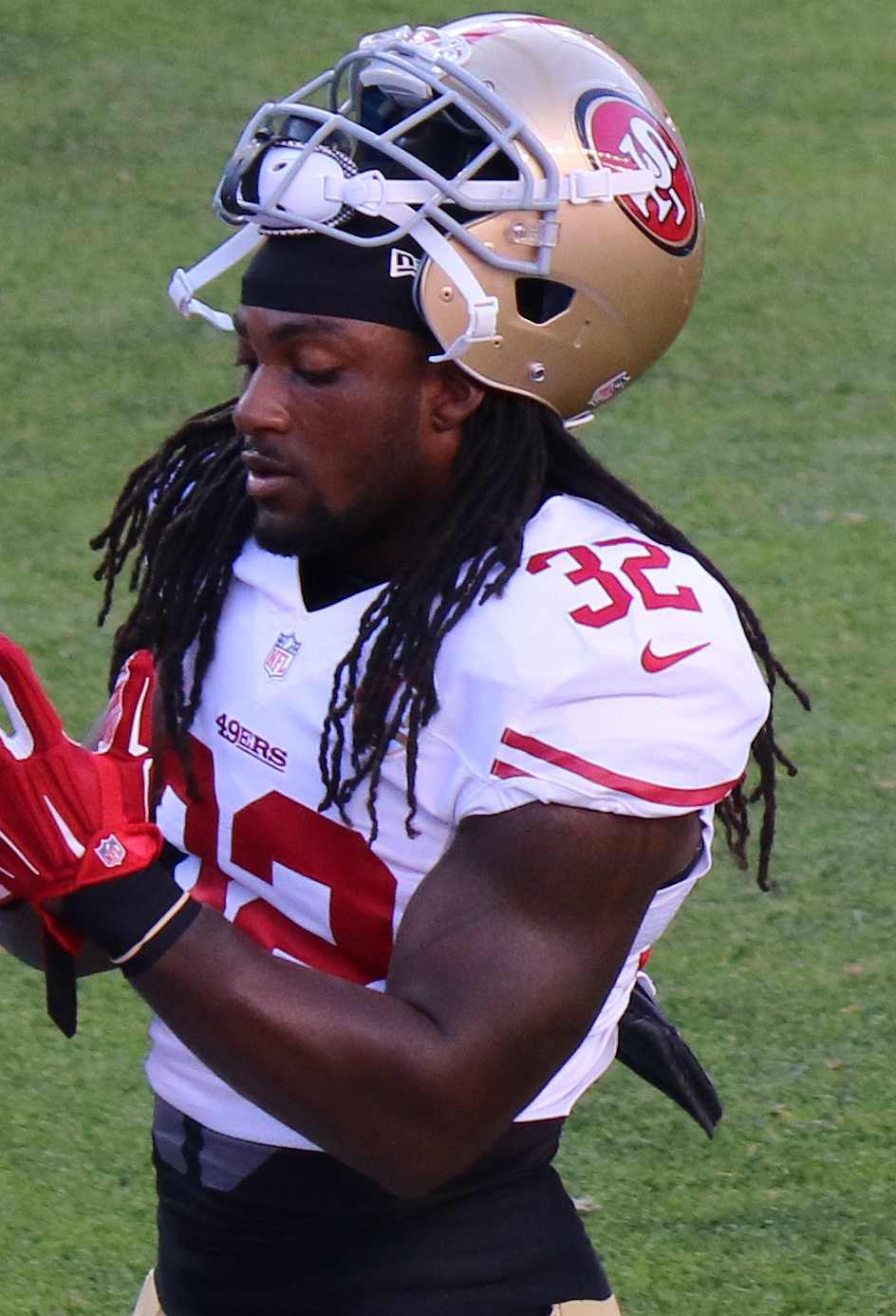
- Harris with the San Francisco 49ers in 2016

No. 26, 32, 40, 41
- Position: Running back

Personal information
- Born: September 3, 1988 (age 38); Brooksville, Florida, U.S.
- Listed height: 5 ft 7 in (1.70 m)
- Listed weight: 197 lb (89 kg)

Career information
- High school: Central (Brooksville)
- College: Troy
- NFL draft: 2011: undrafted

Career history
- Jacksonville Jaguars (2011); Pittsburgh Steelers (2012)*; Green Bay Packers (2012–2014); Minnesota Vikings (2015)*; New Orleans Saints (2015)*; Seattle Seahawks (2015); Baltimore Ravens (2015)*; San Francisco 49ers (2015–2016); Jacksonville Jaguars (2017)*; Los Angeles Wildcats (2020)
- * Offseason or practice squad member only

Awards and highlights
- Second-team All-Sun Belt (2008)

Career NFL statistics
- Rushing attempts: 145
- Rushing yards: 590
- Rushing touchdowns: 2
- Receptions: 21
- Receiving yards: 244
- Receiving touchdowns: 1
- Stats at Pro Football Reference

DuJuan LaTroy Harris (born September 3, 1988) is an American former professional football player who was a running back in the National Football League (NFL). He played college football for the Troy Trojans and was signed as an undrafted free agent by the Jacksonville Jaguars in 2011. Harris was also a member of the Pittsburgh Steelers, Green Bay Packers, Minnesota Vikings, New Orleans Saints, Seattle Seahawks, Baltimore Ravens, San Francisco 49ers, and Los Angeles Wildcats.

== Early life ==
Harris attended Central High School in Brooksville, Florida, where he was an honor student. Harris was known by his nickname "Foxx", which he had since birth. For his sophomore season efforts, Harris was named second-team All-Area. As a junior, he was a first-team All-District, All-Area and All-Region pick. As a senior, Harris helped lead his high school football team to a District Championship, earning first-team All-District, All-Area and All-Region. During his career, Harris recorded 3,000 rushing yards and 45 touchdowns. He holds the county record for the most yards in a single game with 363 yards and five touchdowns.

Harris also lettered in track & field at Central and was named All-State, All-Region, All-District and team MVP. He was a three-time state qualifier and medalist, having won gold medals in the 100-meter dash (10.68s) and 200-meter dash (21.97s) at the 2007 Regional Meet, as well as the long jump (24-4 or 7.42m) and triple jump (47-1 or 14.36m) at the Outdoor State Meet. Also a letterman in weightlifting, Harris was named All-State, All-Region and All-District and even qualified for the state meet in the 183-pound class.

== College career ==
As a freshman in 2007, Harris saw action in all 12 games as a backup running back, finishing as the team's third leading rusher, with 82 carries for 372 yards with just two fumbles during the season, losing one. He also had five receptions for 29 yards during the past season. Harris' best performance came against Middle Tennessee when he rushed for 57 yards on 11 carries. Harris had six kickoff returns for 144 yards, including two for 66 yards against Arkansas.

As a sophomore in 2008, Harris was named to the second-team All-Sun Belt squad, and finished as the Sun Belt's fourth leading rusher. He finished ranked 51st in the nation and is just the fifth player in school history to rush for 1,000 yards in a season. In his best outing, a head-to-head showdown with the Sun Belt's all-time leading rusher Tyrell Fenroy, Harris dominated with a career-high 235 yards on the ground while Fenroy was held to just 23. He was named Troy's offensive player of the week three times and was the Sun Belt Offensive Player of the Week for his performance against Louisiana Monroe when he rushed for 143 yards and a touchdown. Harris rushed for more than 100 yards in a game four times, including 148 yards and two scores against Middle Tennessee to go with a touchdown reception. He finished the season ranked fifth in the league, and 91st in the nation, in all-purpose yards, while also ranking fifth in the league in scoring.

As a junior in 2009, Harris was voted Preseason All-Sun Belt by coaches and media. He owned the highest vertical leap (41.5 inches) and 2nd fastest 40-yard dash time (4.37s) on Troy's team. Harris finished the season as Troy's second-leading rusher with 583 yards and 10 touchdowns. He had his best game of the season in a national spotlight with 112 yards and two scores on the ground against Central Michigan in the 2010 GMAC Bowl.

As a senior in 2010, Harris rushed for 603 yards on 97 carries (a 6.0 yards-per-carry average) and nine touchdowns.

== Professional career ==
=== Pre-draft ===
Harris was not invited to perform at the 2011 NFL Combine, but performed well at the Troy Pro Day.

Pre-draft measurables
Height	Weight	40-yard dash	10-yard split	20-yard split	20-yard shuttle	Three-cone drill	Vertical jump	Broad jump	Bench press
5 ft 7 in (1.70 m)	197 lb (89 kg)	4.44 s	1.44 s	2.58 s	4.35 s	7.15 s	38.5 in (0.98 m)	10 ft 0 in (3.05 m)	27 reps
All values from Troy Pro Day

=== Jacksonville Jaguars (first stint) ===
Harris was signed by the Jacksonville Jaguars as an undrafted free agent in 2011. He was released on August 25, 2012.

=== Pittsburgh Steelers ===
On August 27, 2012, Harris was claimed off waivers by the Pittsburgh Steelers, but was released four days later.

=== Green Bay Packers ===
On October 24, 2012, Harris was signed to the Green Bay Packers' practice squad. Prior to being signed, he spent one week as a car salesman at a Jacksonville Chrysler Jeep Dodge Ram Arlington On December 1, Harris was signed to the Packers' active roster. He scored his first NFL touchdown on December 9 in a 27–20 victory over the Detroit Lions.

On January 5, 2013, during the Wild Card Round against the Vikings Harris totaled 100 yards in rushing and receiving with a touchdown as the Packers went on to win 24–10. In the Divisional Round loss to the San Francisco 49ers, Harris carried the ball 11 times, rushing for 53 yards and a touchdown. He added 2 receptions for 11 yards.

On August 27, 2013, it was announced that Harris would miss the entire 2013 football season with a knee injury.

On March 10, 2015, Harris' agent said the Packers declined to extend a qualifying tender offer to the restricted free agent, and he would be released from the team.

=== Minnesota Vikings ===
On March 19, 2015, Harris signed a one-year, $660,000 contract with the Minnesota Vikings.

=== New Orleans Saints ===
On September 14, 2015, the New Orleans Saints announced that, following a workout of several running backs, they had signed Harris to the practice squad.

=== Seattle Seahawks ===
On November 23, 2015, Harris was signed to the Seattle Seahawks practice squad. Harris was released on December 15.

=== Baltimore Ravens ===
On December 17, 2015, Harris was signed to the Baltimore Ravens practice squad.

=== San Francisco 49ers ===
The San Francisco 49ers signed Harris from the Ravens practice squad on December 23, 2015.

On September 3, 2016, Harris was released by the 49ers, but was re-signed two days later. He was released again on October 1 and was re-signed to the practice squad two days later. Harris was promoted to the active roster on October 22, 2016.

On March 27, 2017, Harris re-signed with the 49ers. He was released on May 8.

=== Jacksonville Jaguars (second stint) ===
On August 20, 2017, Harris signed with the Jacksonville Jaguars. He was released on September 1.

=== Los Angeles Wildcats ===
Harris signed with the Los Angeles Wildcats of the XFL on December 22, 2019. When the season ended prematurely due to the COVID-19 pandemic, Harris had played in four out of a possible five games, rushing 21 times for 44 yards and a touchdown, the deciding score in the Wildcat's week 5 win over the Tampa Bay Vipers. He had his contract terminated when the league suspended operations on April 10, 2020.

== NFL career statistics ==
=== Regular season ===
Year	Team	Games		Rushing					Receiving				
Year	Team	GP	GS	Att	Yds	Avg	Lng	TD	Rec	Yds	Avg	Lng	TD
2011	JAX	5	0	9	42	4.7	24	0	1	4	4.0	4	0
2012	GB	4	2	34	157	4.6	21	2	2	17	8.5	11	0
2014	GB	15	0	16	64	4.0	12	0	1	4	4.0	4	0
2015	SEA	2	0	21	49	2.3	6	0	0	0	0.0	0	0
2015	SF	2	1	27	140	5.2	47	0	9	97	10.8	31	0
2016	SF	10	1	38	138	3.6	19	0	8	115	14.4	47	1
Total		38	4	145	590	4.1	47	2	21	244	11.6	47	1

=== Postseason ===
Year	Team	Games		Rushing					Receiving				
Year	Team	GP	GS	Att	Yds	Avg	Lng	TD	Rec	Yds	Avg	Lng	TD
2012	GB	2	2	28	100	3.6	18	2	7	64	9.1	16	0
Total		2	2	28	100	3.6	18	2	7	64	9.1	16	0
