= Atlanta Falcons draft history =

This page is a list of the Atlanta Falcons NFL draft selections. The first draft the Falcons participated in was 1966, in which they made linebacker Tommy Nobis of Texas their first-ever selection. The Falcons have had the number one overall pick four times in their history.

== Key ==
= Pro Bowler or All-Pro
= MVP
= Hall of Famer

== 1966 draft ==
Round	Pick #	Overall	Name	Position	College
1	1	1	Tommy Nobis	Linebacker	Texas
1	16	16	Randy Johnson	Quarterback	Texas A&I
2	1	17	Nick Rassas	Defensive Back	Notre Dame
2	16	32	Jerry Jones	Offensive Tackle	Bowling Green
3	1	33	Mike Dennis	Running Back	Ole Miss
3	16	48	Phil Sheridan	Wide Receiver	Notre Dame
4	1	49	Ken Reaves	Safety	Norfolk State
4	16	64	Willie Asbury	Running Back	Kent State
5	1	65	Bill Wolski	Running Back	Notre Dame
5	16	80	Martin Kahn	Offensive Tackle	North Texas State
6	1	81	Charley Casey	Wide Receiver	Florida
7	1	96	William Johnson	Running Back	Sewanee
8	1	111	Bill Goss	Linebacker	Tulane
9	1	126	Bob Sanders	Linebacker	North Texas State
10	1	141	Mike Bender	Guard	Arkansas
11	1	156	Steve Sloan	Quarterback	Alabama
12	1	171	Ken Hollister	Offensive Tackle	Indiana
13	1	186	Bob Collins	Offensive Tackle	South Carolina
14	1	201	Steve Ecker	Kicker	Shippensburg
15	1	216	Tom Tolleson	Wide Receiver	Alabama
16	1	231	Jim Vining	Guard	Rice
17	1	246	Lurley Archambeau	Center	Florida
18	1	261	Doug Korver	Center	Northern Iowa
19	1	276	Walt Mainer	Defensive Back	Xavier
20	1	291	Bob Riggle	Defensive Back	Penn State

== 1967 draft ==
Round	Pick #	Overall	Name	Position	College
2	5	31	Leo Carroll	Defensive End	San Diego State
3	4	57	Jimmy Jordan	Running Back	Florida
5	5	112	Bill Delaney	Tight End	American International
5	13	120	Randy Matson	Defensive Tackle	Texas A&M
6	15	148	Eugene Snipes	Running Back	Elizabeth City
6	18	151	Martine Bircher	Defensive Back	Arkansas
7	3	162	Corey Colehour	Quarterback	North Dakota
9	4	215	Bob Moten	Wide Receiver	Bishop College
10	3	240	Dick Schafroth	Offensive Tackle	Iowa State
11	5	268	John Walker	Linebacker	Jackson State
12	3	293	Bill Gentry	Linebacker	North Carolina State
13	2	317	Sandor Szabo	Kicker	Ithaca
14	5	346	Tom Bryan	Running Back	Auburn
15	4	371	Al Nicholas	Running Back	Sacramento State
16	3	396	Larry Chester	Defensive Back	Allen
17	5	424	Bill Buckner	Quarterback	Delta State

== 1968 draft ==
Round	Pick #	Overall	Name	Position	College
1	3	3	Claude Humphrey	Defensive End	Tennessee State
2	2	29	Carlton Dabney	Defensive Tackle	Morgan State
2	26	53	John Wright	Wide Receiver	Illinois
6	2	140	Jim Hagle	Running Back	SMU
6	9	147	Joe Wynns	Defensive Back	South Carolina State
6	24	162	Rick Eber	Wide Receiver	Tulsa
8	2	194	Ray Jeffords	Tight End	Georgia
9	2	221	Henry Holland	Center	North Texas State
10	2	248	Mike Tomasini	Defensive Tackle	Colorado State
11	2	275	Greg Brezina	Linebacker	Houston
12	2	302	A.J. Vaughn	Running Back	Wayne State
13	2	329	Billy Harris	Running Back	Colorado
14	2	356	Joe Polk	Running Back	Livingstone
15	2	383	Don Bean	Wide Receiver	Houston
16	2	410	Roy Hall	Offensive Tackle	San Jose State
17	2	437	Jim Schmidt	Defensive Back	San Francisco State

== 1969 draft ==
Round	Pick #	Overall	Name	Position	College
1	2	2	George Kunz	Offensive Tackle	Notre Dame
2	3	29	Paul Gipson	Running Back	Houston
3	2	54	Malcolm Snider	Offensive Tackle	Stanford
3	15	67	Jon Sandstrom	Guard	Oregon State
4	3	81	James Mitchell	Tight End	Prairie View A&M
4	25	103	Dicky Lyons	Defensive Back	Kentucky
5	23	127	Tony Pleviak	Defensive End	Illinois
6	7	137	Wally Oyler	Defensive Back	Louisville
7	2	158	Dick Enderle	Guard	Minnesota
7	8	164	Ted Cottrell	Linebacker	Delaware Valley
8	3	185	Jim Callahan	Wide Receiver	Temple
10	3	237	Jeff Stanciel	Running Back	Mississippi Valley State
11	2	262	Jeff Van Note	Center	Kentucky
12	3	289	Denver Samples	Defensive Tackle	UTEP
13	2	313	Harry Carpenter	Offensive Tackle	Tennessee State
14	3	341	Billy Hunt	Defensive Back	Kansas
15	2	366	Jim Weatherford	Defensive Back	Tennessee
16	3	393	Ed Hughes	Running Back	Texas Southern
17	2	418	Paul Williams	Running Back	California

== 1970 draft ==
Round	Pick #	Overall	Name	Position	College
1	12	12	John Small	Defensive Tackle	The Citadel
2	13	39	Art Malone	Running Back	Arizona State
3	12	64	Andy Maurer	Guard	Oregon
3	13	65	Todd Snyder	Wide Receiver	Ohio
4	6	84	Paul Reed	Offensive Tackle	Johnson C. Smith
5	8	112	Bruce Van Ness	Running Back	Rutgers
5	12	116	Kem Mendenhall	Center	Oklahoma
6	13	143	Mack Herron	Running Back	Kansas State
6	17	147	Jade Butcher	Wide Receiver	Indiana
6	22	152	Randy Marshall	Defensive End	Linfield
7	13	169	Gary Orcutt	Wide Receiver	USC
8	12	194	Larry Brewer	Tight End	Louisiana Tech
8	13	195	Seth Miller	Defensive Back	Arizona State
9	12	220	Roy Robinson	Defensive Back	Montana
10	13	247	Jim Hatcher	Defensive Back	Kansas
11	12	272	Mike Brunson	Running Back	Arizona State
12	13	299	Lonnie Holton	Running Back	Northern Michigan
13	12	324	Rich Stepanek	Defensive Tackle	Iowa
14	13	351	Chuck Wald	Wide Receiver	North Dakota State
15	12	376	Keith Mauney	Defensive Back	Princeton
16	13	403	Steve Parnell	Wide Receiver	Massachusetts
17	12	428	Bill Bell	Kicker	Kansas

== 1971 draft ==
Round	Pick #	Overall	Name	Position	College
1	7	7	Joe Profit	Running Back	Northeast Louisiana
2	7	33	Ken Burrow	Wide Receiver	San Diego State
3	7	59	Leo Hart	Quarterback	Duke
4	7	85	Mike Potchad	Offensive Tackle	Pittsburg State
5	7	111	Ray Jarvis	Wide Receiver	Norfolk State
6	7	137	Tom Hayes	Cornerback	San Diego State
6	18	148	Ray Brown	Defensive Back	West Texas State
7	7	163	Wesley Chesson	Wide Receiver	Duke
8	7	189	Dennis Havig	Guard	Colorado
9	7	215	Alvin Griffin	Wide Receiver	Tuskegee
10	7	241	Faddie Tillman	Defensive Tackle	Boise State
11	7	267	Larry Shears	Defensive Back	Lincoln (MO)
12	7	293	Ronnie Lowe	Wide Receiver	Fort Valley State
13	7	319	Dan Crooks	Defensive Back	Wisconsin
14	7	345	Daryl Comer	Tight End	Texas
15	7	371	Wallace Clark	Running Back	Auburn
16	7	397	Lindsey James	Running Back	San Diego State
17	7	423	Willie Martin	Running Back	Johnson C. Smith

== 1972 draft ==
Round	Pick #	Overall	Name	Position	College
1	15	15	Clarence Ellis	Safety	Notre Dame
2	14	40	Pat Sullivan	Quarterback	Auburn
2	15	41	Steve Okoniewski	Offensive Tackle	Montana
2	16	42	Rosie Manning	Defensive Tackle	Northeastern State
3	15	67	Les Goodman	Running Back	Yankton
4	16	94	Andrew Howard	Defensive Tackle	Grambling
5	5	109	Billy Taylor	Running Back	Michigan
5	15	119	Ralph Cindrich	Linebacker	Pittsburgh
6	10	140	Mike Perfetti	Defensive Back	Minnesota
6	16	146	Fred Riley	Wide Receiver	Idaho
7	15	171	Lance Moon	Running Back	Wisconsin
8	16	198	Henry Brandon	Running Back	Southern
9	15	223	Ray Easterling	Safety	Richmond
11	15	275	Jack Phillips	Wide Receiver	Grambling
12	16	302	Larry Mialik	Tight End	Wisconsin
13	15	327	Henry Sovio	Tight End	Hawaii
14	16	354	Tom Chandler	Linebacker	Minnesota
15	15	379	Oscar Jenkins	Defensive Back	Virginia Union
16	16	406	Larry Butler	Linebacker	Stanford

== 1973 draft ==
Round	Pick #	Overall	Name	Position	College
2	13	39	Greg Marx	Defensive End	Notre Dame
4	16	94	Tom Geredine	Wide Receiver	Northeast Missouri State
6	12	142	Nick Bebout	Offensive Tackle	Wyoming
7	14	170	George Campbell	Defensive Back	Iowa State
8	13	195	Tom Reed	Guard	Arkansas
9	12	220	Russ Ingram	Center	Texas Tech
10	14	248	Nick Mike-Mayer	Kicker	Temple
11	13	273	Byron Buelow	Defensive Back	Wisconsin–La Crosse
12	12	298	Mike Samples	Linebacker	Drake
13	14	326	Chris Stecher	Offensive Tackle	Claremont McKenna
14	13	351	John Madeya	Quarterback	Louisville
15	12	376	Thomas Gage	Defensive Back	Lamar
16	14	404	Rufus Ferguson	Running Back	Wisconsin
17	12	428	Jim Hedge	Wide Receiver	Arkansas

== 1974 draft ==
Round	Pick #	Overall	Name	Position	College
2	18	44	Gerald Tinker	Wide Receiver	Kent State
3	17	69	Kim McQuilken	Quarterback	Lehigh
3	19	71	Mo Spencer	Defensive Back	North Carolina Central
4	18	96	Vince Kendrick	Running Back	Florida
5	5	109	Henry Childs	Tight End	Kansas State
5	24	128	Monroe Eley	Running Back	Arizona State
6	17	147	Doyle Orange	Running Back	Southern Miss
7	17	173	James Coode	Offensive Tackle	Michigan
9	17	225	Larry Bailey	Defensive Tackle	Pacific
10	18	252	Paul Ryczek	Center	Virginia
11	17	277	Eddie Wilson	Wide Receiver	Albany
12	18	304	Vic Koegel	Linebacker	Ohio State
13	17	329	Ralph Powell	Running Back	Nebraska
14	18	356	John Givens	Guard	Villanova
15	17	381	Willie Jones	Wide Receiver	Iowa State
16	18	408	Sylvester McGee	Running Back	Rhode Island
17	17	433	Al Davis	Guard	Boise State

== 1975 draft ==
Round	Pick #	Overall	Name	Position	College
1	1	1	Steve Bartkowski	Quarterback	California
2	3	29	Ralph Ortega	Linebacker	Florida
3	13	65	Woody Thompson	Running Back	Miami (FL)
4	3	81	John Nessel	Guard	Penn State
5	19	123	Greg McCrary	Tight End	Clark Atlanta
6	2	132	Fulton Kuykendall	Linebacker	UCLA
6	3	133	Doug Payton	Guard	Colorado
7	3	159	Mike Esposito	Running Back	Boston College
8	3	185	Brent Adams	Offensive Tackle	Tennessee
9	3	211	Brad Davis	Running Back	LSU
10	3	237	Marshall Mills	Wide Receiver	West Virginia
11	3	263	Jeff Merrow	Defensive End	West Virginia
12	3	289	Alonza Pickett	Offensive Tackle	Texas Southern
13	3	315	Carl Russ	Linebacker	Michigan
14	3	341	Steve Robinson	Defensive Tackle	Tuskegee
15	3	367	Jimmy Robinson	Wide Receiver	Georgia Tech
16	3	393	Steve Knutson	Guard	USC
17	3	419	Mitch Anderson	Quarterback	Northwestern

== 1976 draft ==
Round	Pick #	Overall	Name	Position	College
1	9	9	Bubba Bean	Running Back	Texas A&M
2	8	36	Sonny Collins	Running Back	Kentucky
3	11	71	Dave Scott	Guard	Kansas
4	10	102	Walt Brett	Defensive End	Montana
6	13	169	Stan Varner	Defensive Tackle	BYU
7	11	193	Karl Farmer	Wide Receiver	Pittsburgh
8	10	219	Frank Reed	Cornerback	Washington
9	9	246	Phil McKinnely	Offensive Tackle	UCLA
11	11	302	Chuck Brislin	Offensive Tackle	Mississippi State
12	10	329	Pat Bolton	Kicker	Montana State
13	9	356	Mike Williams	Offensive Tackle	Florida
14	8	383	Mark Husfloen	Defensive End	Washington State
15	11	414	Ron Olson	Defensive Back	Washington
16	10	441	Pat Curto	Linebacker	Ohio State
17	9	468	Tony Green	Defensive Back	Texas Tech

== 1977 draft ==
Round	Pick #	Overall	Name	Position	College
1	6	6	Warren Bryant	Offensive Tackle	Kentucky
1	20	20	Wilson Faumuina	Defensive Tackle	San José State
2	8	36	R. C. Thielemann	Guard	Arkansas
4	6	90	Allan Leavitt	Kicker	Georgia
5	8	120	Shelton Diggs	Wide Receiver	USC
6	22	161	Keith Jenkins	Defensive Back	Cincinnati
8	8	203	Walter Packer	Wide Receiver	Mississippi State
9	7	230	John Maxwell	Offensive Tackle	Boston College
9	19	242	Robert Speer	Defensive End	Arkansas State
10	6	257	Billy Ryckman	Wide Receiver	Louisiana Tech
11	8	287	Dave Farmer	Running Back	USC
12	7	312	Don Parrish	Defensive Tackle	Pittsburgh

== 1978 draft ==
Round	Pick #	Overall	Name	Position	College
1	13	13	Mike Kenn	Offensive Tackle	Michigan
2	15	43	Steve Stewart	Linebacker	Minnesota
3	14	70	Stan Waldemore	Guard	Nebraska
4	11	95	Brian Cabral	Linebacker	Colorado
5	15	125	Dennis Pearson	Wide Receiver	San Diego State
6	14	152	Rodney Parker	Wide Receiver	Tennessee State
7	1	167	Alfred Jackson	Wide Receiver	Texas
7	13	179	James Wright	Tight End	TCU
8	15	209	David Adkins	Linebacker	Ohio State
8	22	216	David Williams	Defensive Back	Tennessee-Martin
9	14	236	Tom Pridemore	Safety	West Virginia
10	7	257	Ricky Patton	Running Back	Jackson State
10	13	263	Ray Strong	Running Back	UNLV
11	15	293	Scooter Reed	Defensive Back	Baylor
12	14	320	Daria Butler	Linebacker	Oklahoma State

== 1979 draft ==
Round	Pick #	Overall	Name	Position	College
1	17	17	Don Smith	Defensive End	Miami (FL)
2	21	49	Pat Howell	Guard	USC
3	17	75	James Mayberry	Running Back	Colorado
3	23	79	William Andrews	Running Back	Auburn
4	18	100	Lynn Cain	Running Back	USC
4	19	101	Charles Johnson	Defensive Back	Grambling
5	17	127	Mike Zele	Defensive Tackle	Kent State
6	17	154	Mike Moroski	Quarterback	UC Davis
7	21	186	Roger Westlund	Offensive Tackle	Washington
8	20	212	Keith Miller	Linebacker	Northeastern State (OK)
9	19	239	Dave Parkin	Defensive Back	Utah State
10	18	266	Bruce Beekley	Linebacker	Oregon
11	17	292	Bill Leer	Center	Colorado State
12	20	323	Stuart Walker	Linebacker	Colorado

== 1980 draft ==
Round	Pick #	Overall	Name	Position	College
1	7	7	Junior Miller	Tight End	Nebraska
2	8	36	Buddy Curry	Linebacker	North Carolina
3	7	63	Earl Jones	Defensive Back	Norfolk State
4	8	91	Jim Laughlin	Linebacker	Ohio State
4	21	104	I.M. Hipp	Running Back	Nebraska
5	7	117	Brad Vassar	Linebacker	Pacific
5	27	137	Kenny Johnson	Safety	Mississippi State
6	8	146	Mike Davis	Defensive Back	Colorado
7	7	172	Mike Smith	Wide Receiver	Grambling
8	8	201	Al Richardson	Linebacker	Georgia Tech
9	7	228	Glen Keller	Center	West Texas State
10	8	247	Walt Bellamy	Defensive Back	VMI
11	7	284	Mike Babb	Defensive Back	Oklahoma
12	8	313	Quinn Jones	Running Back	Tulsa

== 1981 draft ==
Round	Pick #	Overall	Name	Position	College
1	25	25	Bobby Butler	Cornerback	Florida State
2	26	54	Lyman White	Linebacker	LSU
3	24	80	Scott Woerner	Defensive Back	Georgia
4	26	109	John Scully	Guard	Notre Dame
5	25	136	Eric Sanders	Offensive Tackle	Nevada
6	26	164	Harry Standback	Defensive Tackle	North Carolina
8	26	219	Cliff Toney	Defensive Back	Auburn
9	24	245	Calvin Fance	Running Back	Rice
10	26	274	Robert Murphy	Defensive Back	Ohio State
11	25	301	Keith Chappelle	Wide Receiver	Iowa
12	26	330	Mark McCants	Defensive Back	Temple

== 1982 draft ==
Round	Pick #	Overall	Name	Position	College
1	9	9	Gerald Riggs	Running Back	Arizona State
2	9	36	Doug Rogers	Defensive End	Stanford
3	8	63	Stacey Bailey	Wide Receiver	San Jose State
4	12	95	Reggie Brown	Running Back	Oregon
5	11	122	Von Mansfield	Defensive Back	Wisconsin
6	10	149	Mike Kelley	Quarterback	Georgia Tech
7	9	176	David Tolomu	Running Back	Hawaii
8	8	203	Ricky Eberhart	Defensive Back	Morris Brown
9	12	235	Mike Horan	Punter	Long Beach State
10	11	262	Curtis Stowers	Linebacker	Mississippi State
11	9	288	Jeff Keller	Wide Receiver	Washington State
12	9	315	Dave Levenick	Linebacker	Wisconsin

== 1983 draft ==
Round	Pick #	Overall	Name	Position	College
1	16	16	Mike Pitts	Defensive End	Alabama
2	15	43	James Britt	Defensive Back	LSU
3	19	75	Andrew Provence	Defensive Tackle	South Carolina
4	18	102	John Harper	Linebacker	Southern Illinois
5	17	129	Brett Miller	Offensive Tackle	Iowa
6	16	156	Anthony Allen	Wide Receiver	Washington
7	15	183	Jeff Turk	Defensive Back	Boise State
8	19	215	John Rade	Linebacker	Boise State
10	17	268	Ralph Giacomarro	Punter	Penn State
11	16	295	John Salley	Defensive Back	Wyoming
12	15	322	Allama Matthews	Tight End	Vanderbilt

== 1984 draft ==
Round	Pick #	Overall	Name	Position	College
1	9	9	Rick Bryan	Defensive Tackle	Oklahoma
2	4	32	Scott Case	Defensive Back	Oklahoma
2	8	36	Thomas Benson	Linebacker	Oklahoma
3	7	63	Rod McSwain	Cornerback	Clemson
4	10	94	Rydell Malancon	Linebacker	LSU
5	20	132	Cliff Benson	Tight End	Purdue
6	8	148	Ben Bennett	Quarterback	Duke
6	23	163	Dan Ralph	Defensive Tackle	Oregon
7	7	175	Kirk Dodge	Linebacker	UNLV
8	10	206	Jeff Jackson	Linebacker	Auburn
9	9	233	Glen Howe	Offensive Tackle	Southern Mississippi
10	8	260	Derrick Franklin	Defensive Back	Fresno State
11	7	287	Tommy Norman	Wide Receiver	Jackson State
12	10	318	Don Holmes	Wide Receiver	Mesa State

== 1985 draft ==
Round	Pick #	Overall	Name	Position	College
1	2	2	Bill Fralic	Guard	Pittsburgh
2	17	45	Mike Gann	Defensive End	Notre Dame
4	5	89	Emile Harry	Wide Receiver	Stanford
6	12	152	Reggie Pleasant	Defensive Back	Clemson
8	5	201	Ashley Lee	Defensive Back	Virginia Tech
8	19	215	Ronnie Washington	Linebacker	Northeast Louisiana
9	4	228	Micah Moon	Linebacker	North Carolina
10	5	257	Brent Martin	Center	Stanford
11	4	284	John Ayres	Defensive Back	Illinois
12	5	313	Ken Whisenhunt	Tight End	Georgia Tech

== 1986 draft ==
Round	Pick #	Overall	Name	Position	College
1	2	2	Tony Casillas	Defensive Tackle	Oklahoma
1	17	17	Tim Green	Linebacker	Syracuse
6	16	154	Floyd Dixon	Wide Receiver	Stephen F. Austin
6	21	159	Keith Williams	Wide Receiver	Southwest Missouri State
8	3	197	Kevin Hudgens	Defensive End	Idaho State
9	3	224	Kevin Starks	Tight End	Minnesota
10	3	252	Tony Baker	Running Back	East Carolina
11	3	280	Chris Hegg	Quarterback	Northeast Missouri State
12	3	308	Steve Griffin	Wide Receiver	Purdue

== 1987 draft ==
Round	Pick #	Overall	Name	Position	College
1	13	13	Chris Miller	Quarterback	Oregon
2	3	31	Kenny Flowers	Running Back	Clemson
4	13	97	Ralph Van Dyke	Offensive Tackle	Southern Illinois
5	13	125	Mark Mraz	Defensive End	Utah State
6	13	153	Paul Kiser	Guard	Wake Forest
7	13	181	Michael Reid	Linebacker	Wisconsin
8	13	208	Curtis Taliaferro	Linebacker	Virginia Tech
9	13	236	Terrance Anthony	Defensive Back	Iowa State
10	13	264	Jerry Reese	Tight End	Illinois
11	13	292	Elbert Shelley	Defensive Back	Arkansas State
12	13	320	Larry Emery	Running Back	Wisconsin

== 1988 draft ==
Round	Pick #	Overall	Name	Position	College
1	1	1	Aundray Bruce	Linebacker	Auburn
2	1	28	Marcus Cotton	Linebacker	USC
3	1	56	Alex Higdon	Tight End	Ohio State
5	1	110	Charles Dimry	Cornerback	UNLV
6	1	138	George Thomas	Wide Receiver	UNLV
6	3	140	Houston Hoover	Guard	Jackson State
7	1	166	Michael Haynes	Wide Receiver	Northern Arizona
8	1	194	Phillip Brown	Linebacker	Alabama
9	1	222	James Primus	Running Back	UCLA
10	1	250	Stan Clayton	Offensive Tackle	Penn State
11	1	278	James Milling	Wide Receiver	Maryland
12	1	306	Carter Wiley	Defensive Back	Virginia Tech

== 1989 draft ==
Round	Pick #	Overall	Name	Position	College
1	4	4	Deion Sanders	Cornerback	Florida State
1	27	27	Shawn Collins	Wide Receiver	Northern Arizona
2	10	38	Ralph Norwood	Offensive Tackle	LSU
3	6	62	Keith Jones	Running Back	Illinois
6	6	145	Troy Sadowski	Tight End	Georgia
7	5	172	Undra Johnson	Running Back	West Virginia
8	7	202	Paul Singer	Quarterback	Western Illinois
9	6	229	Chris Dunn	Linebacker	Cal Poly
11	7	286	Greg Paterra	Running Back	Slippery Rock
12	6	313	Tony Bowick	Defensive Tackle	Tennessee-Chattanooga

== 1990 draft ==
Round	Pick #	Overall	Name	Position	College
1	20	20	Steve Broussard	Running Back	Washington State
2	2	27	Darion Conner	Linebacker	Jackson State
3	2	55	Oliver Barnett	Defensive End	Kentucky
5	12	121	Reggie Redding	Offensive Tackle	Cal State-Fullerton
6	2	139	Mike Pringle	Running Back	Cal State-Fullerton
8	2	195	Tory Epps	Defensive Tackle	Memphis State
9	2	222	Darrell Jordan	Linebacker	Northern Arizona
10	2	250	Donnie Salum	Linebacker	Arizona
11	2	278	Chris Ellison	Defensive Back	Houston
12	1	305	Shawn McCarthy	Punter	Purdue

== 1991 draft ==
Round	Pick #	Overall	Name	Position	College
1	3	3	Bruce Pickens	Cornerback	Nebraska
1	13	13	Mike Pritchard	Wide Receiver	Colorado
2	6	33	Brett Favre	Quarterback	Southern Mississippi
4	4	87	Moe Gardner	Defensive Tackle	Illinois
5	3	114	James Goode	Linebacker	Oklahoma
6	6	145	Erric Pegram	Running Back	North Texas
7	5	172	Brian Mitchell	Cornerback	BYU
7	19	186	Mark Tucker	Guard	USC
8	4	199	Randy Austin	Tight End	UCLA
9	3	226	Ernie Logan	Defensive Tackle	East Carolina
10	6	256	Walter Sutton	Wide Receiver	Southwest State
10	8	258	Pete Lucas	Offensive Tackle	Wisconsin–Stevens Point
11	5	283	Joe Sims	Defensive Tackle	Nebraska
12	4	310	Bob Christian	Fullback	Northwestern

== 1992 draft ==
Round	Pick #	Overall	Name	Position	College
1	8	8	Bob Whitfield	Offensive Tackle	Stanford
1	19	19	Tony Smith	Running Back	Southern Miss
2	23	51	Chuck Smith	Defensive End	Tennessee
3	17	73	Howard Dinkins	Linebacker	Florida State
4	20	104	Frankie Smith	Cornerback	Baylor
6	18	158	Terry Ray	Defensive Back	Oklahoma
7	14	182	Tim Paulk	Linebacker	Florida
8	20	216	Derrick Moore	Running Back	Troy State
8	21	217	Reggie Dwight	Tight End	Troy State
9	19	243	Keith Alex	Offensive Tackle	Texas A&M
10	18	270	Darryl Hardy	Linebacker	Tennessee
11	17	297	Robin Jones	Defensive End	Baylor

== 1993 draft ==
Round	Pick #	Overall	Name	Position	College
1	9	9	Lincoln Kennedy	Offensive Tackle	Washington
2	9	38	Roger Harper	Safety	Ohio State
3	11	67	Harold Alexander	Punter	Appalachian State
5	9	121	Ron George	Linebacker	Stanford
6	11	151	Mitch Lyons	Tight End	Michigan State
7	10	178	Darnell Walker	Cornerback	Oklahoma
8	9	205	Shannon Baker	Wide Receiver	Florida State

== 1994 draft ==
Round	Pick #	Overall	Name	Position	College
2	16	45	Bert Emanuel	Wide Receiver	Rice
3	7	72	Anthony Phillips	Cornerback	Texas A&M-Kingsville
3	34	99	Alai Kalaniuvalu	Guard	Oregon State
4	8	111	Perry Klein	Quarterback	C.W. Post
4	15	118	Mitch Davis	Linebacker	Georgia
5	7	138	Harrison Houston	Wide Receiver	Florida
7	7	201	Jamal Anderson	Running Back	Utah

== 1995 draft ==
Round	Pick #	Overall	Name	Position	College
1	26	26	Devin Bush	Safety	Florida State
2	9	41	Ronald Davis	Cornerback	Tennessee
3	13	77	Lorenzo Styles	Linebacker	Ohio State
5	11	145	Roell Preston	Wide Receiver	Ole Miss
6	10	181	Travis Hall	Defensive End	BYU
7	37	245	John Burrough	Defensive Tackle	Wyoming

== 1996 draft ==
Round	Pick #	Overall	Name	Position	College
3	23	84	Shannon Brown	Defensive Tackle	Alabama
4	22	117	Richard Huntley	Running Back	Winston-Salem State
4	32	127	Juran Bolden	Cornerback	Mississippi Delta
5	32	164	Gary Bandy	Linebacker	Baylor
6	21	188	Craig Sauer	Linebacker	Minnesota
7	20	229	Ethan Brooks	Offensive Tackle	Williams

== 1997 draft ==
Round	Pick #	Overall	Name	Position	College
1	11	11	Michael Booker	Cornerback	Nebraska
2	2	32	Nathan Davis	Defensive End	Indiana
2	11	41	Byron Hanspard	Running Back	Texas Tech
3	10	70	O. J. Santiago	Tight End	Kent State
4	4	100	Henri Crockett	Linebacker	Florida State
5	3	133	Marcus Wimberly	Defensive Back	Miami (FL)
6	17	180	Calvin Collins	Guard	Texas A&M
7	3	204	Tony Graziani	Quarterback	Oregon
7	21	222	Chris Bayne	Defensive Back	Fresno State

== 1998 draft ==
Round	Pick #	Overall	Name	Position	College
1	12	12	Keith Brooking	Linebacker	Georgia Tech
2	23	53	Bob Hallen	Guard	Kent State
3	13	74	Jammi German	Wide Receiver	Miami (FL)
4	11	103	Omar Brown	Defensive Back	North Carolina
4	22	114	Tim Dwight	Wide Receiver	Iowa
6	13	166	Elijah Williams	Defensive Back	Florida
7	10	199	Ephraim Salaam	Offensive Tackle	San Diego State
7	12	201	Ken Oxendine	Running Back	Virginia Tech
7	14	203	Henry Slay	Defensive Tackle	West Virginia

== 1999 draft ==
Round	Pick #	Overall	Name	Position	College
1	30	30	Patrick Kerney	Defensive End	Virginia
2	11	42	Reggie Kelly	Tight End	Mississippi State
3	31	92	Jeff Paulk	Fullback	Arizona State
4	31	126	Johndale Carty	Safety	Utah State
5	31	164	Eugene Baker	Wide Receiver	Kent State
6	29	198	Jeff Kelly	Linebacker	Kansas State
6	31	200	Eric Thigpen	Safety	Iowa
7	31	237	Todd McClure	Center	LSU
7	41	247	Rondel Menendez	Wide Receiver	Eastern Kentucky

== 2000 draft ==
Round	Pick #	Overall	Name	Position	College
2	6	37	Travis Claridge	Guard	USC
3	5	67	Mark Simoneau	Linebacker	Kansas State
4	6	100	Michael Thompson	Guard	Tennessee State
5	5	134	Anthony Midget	Cornerback	Virginia Tech
6	6	172	Mareno Philyaw	Wide Receiver	Troy
7	5	211	Darrick Vaughn	Cornerback	Southwest Texas State

== 2001 draft ==
Round	Pick #	Overall	Name	Position	College
1	1	1	Michael Vick	Quarterback	Virginia Tech
2	4	35	Alge Crumpler	Tight End	North Carolina
4	4	99	Roberto Garza	Guard	Texas A&M-Kingsville
4	7	102	Matt Stewart	Linebacker	Vanderbilt
5	5	136	Vinny Sutherland	Wide Receiver	Purdue
6	4	167	Randy Garner	Defensive End	Arkansas
7	15	215	Corey Hall	Safety	Appalachian State
7	19	219	Kynan Forney	Guard	Hawaii
7	26	226	Ronald Flemons	Defensive End	Texas A&M
7	36	236	Quentin McCord	Wide Receiver	Kentucky

== 2002 draft ==
Round	Pick #	Overall	Name	Position	College
1	18	18	T. J. Duckett	Running Back	Michigan State
3	15	80	Will Overstreet	Linebacker	Tennessee
4	18	116	Martin Bibla	Guard	Miami (FL)
5	13	148	Kevin McCadam	Safety	Virginia Tech
5	23	158	Kurt Kittner	Quarterback	Illinois
6	12	184	Kahlil Hill	Wide Receiver	Iowa
7	6	217	Michael Coleman	Wide Receiver	Widener
7	34	245	Quincy Monk	Linebacker	North Carolina

== 2003 draft ==
Round	Pick #	Overall	Name	Position	College
2	23	55	Bryan Scott	Safety	Penn State
4	24	121	Justin Griffith	Fullback	Mississippi State
5	24	159	Jon Olinger	Wide Receiver	Cincinnati
6	23	196	LaTarence Dunbar	Wide Receiver	TCU
6	29	202	Waine Bacon	Cornerback	Alabama
7	24	238	Demetrin Veal	Defensive Tackle	Tennessee

== 2004 draft ==
Round	Pick #	Overall	Name	Position	College
1	8	8	DeAngelo Hall	Cornerback	Virginia Tech
1	29	29	Michael Jenkins	Wide Receiver	Ohio State
3	27	90	Matt Schaub	Quarterback	Virginia
4	5	101	Demorrio Williams	Linebacker	Nebraska
5	10	142	Chad Lavalais	Defensive Tackle	LSU
6	21	186	Etric Pruitt	Wide Receiver	Southern Miss
7	18	219	Quincy Wilson	Running Back	West Virginia

== 2005 draft ==
Round	Pick #	Overall	Name	Position	College
1	27	27	Roddy White	Wide Receiver	UAB
2	27	59	Jonathan Babineaux	Defensive Tackle	Iowa
3	26	90	Jordan Beck	Linebacker	Cal Poly
4	27	128	Chauncey Davis	Defensive End	Florida State
5	24	160	Michael Boley	Linebacker	Southern Miss
5	27	163	Frank Omiyale	Offensive Tackle	Tennessee Tech
6	27	201	DeAndra Cobb	Running Back	Michigan State
7	27	241	Darrell Shropshire	Defensive Tackle	South Carolina

== 2006 draft ==
Round	Pick #	Overall	Name	Position	College
2	5	37	Jimmy Williams	Cornerback	Virginia Tech
3	15	79	Jerious Norwood	Running Back	Mississippi State
5	6	139	Quinn Ojinnaka	Offensive Tackle	Syracuse
6	15	184	Adam Jennings	Wide Receiver	Fresno State
7	15	223	D. J. Shockley	Quarterback	Georgia

== 2007 draft ==
Round	Pick #	Overall	Name	Position	College
1	8	8	Jamaal Anderson	Defensive End	Arkansas
2	7	39	Justin Blalock	Guard	Texas
2	9	41	Chris Houston	Cornerback	Arkansas
3	11	75	Laurent Robinson	Wide Receiver	Illinois State
4	10	109	Stephen Nicholas	Linebacker	South Florida
4	34	133	Martrez Milner	Tight End	Georgia
6	11	185	Trey Lewis	Defensive Tackle	Washburn
6	20	194	David Irons	Cornerback	Auburn
6	24	198	Doug Datish	Center	Ohio State
6	29	203	Daren Stone	Safety	Maine
7	34	244	Jason Snelling	Running Back	Virginia

== 2008 draft ==
Round	Pick #	Overall	Name	Position	College
1	3	3	Matt Ryan	Quarterback	Boston College
1	21	21	Sam Baker	Offensive Tackle	USC
2	6	37	Curtis Lofton	Linebacker	Oklahoma
3	5	68	Chevis Jackson	Cornerback	LSU
3	21	84	Harry Douglas	Wide Receiver	Louisville
3	35	98	Thomas DeCoud	Safety	California
5	3	138	Robert James	Linebacker	Arizona State
5	19	154	Kroy Biermann	Defensive End	Montana
6	6	173	Thomas Brown	Running Back	Georgia
7	5	212	Wilrey Fontenot	Cornerback	Arizona
7	25	232	Keith Zinger	Tight End	LSU

== 2009 draft ==
Round	Pick #	Overall	Name	Position	College
1	24	24	Peria Jerry	Defensive Tackle	Ole Miss
2	23	55	William Moore	Safety	Missouri
3	26	90	Christopher Owens	Cornerback	San José State
4	25	125	Lawrence Sidbury	Defensive End	Richmond
5	2	138	William Middleton	Cornerback	Furman
5	20	156	Garrett Reynolds	Offensive Tackle	North Carolina
6	3	176	Spencer Adkins	Linebacker	Miami (FL)
7	1	210	Vance Walker	Offensive Tackle	Georgia Tech

== 2010 draft ==
Round	Pick #	Overall	Name	Position	College
1	19	19	Sean Weatherspoon	Linebacker	Missouri
3	19	83	Corey Peters	Defensive Tackle	Kentucky
3	34	98	Mike Johnson	Guard	Alabama
4	19	117	Joe Hawley	Guard	UNLV
5	4	135	Dominique Franks	Cornerback	Oklahoma
5	34	165	Kerry Meier	Wide Receiver	Kansas
6	2	171	Shann Schillinger	Safety	Montana

== 2011 draft ==
Round	Pick #	Overall	Name	Position	College
1	6	6	Julio Jones	Wide Receiver	Alabama
3	27	91	Akeem Dent	Linebacker	Georgia
5	14	145	Jacquizz Rodgers	Running Back	Oregon State
6	27	192	Matt Bosher	Punter	Miami (FL)
7	7	210	Andrew Jackson	Guard	Fresno State
7	27	230	Cliff Matthews	Defensive End	South Carolina

== 2012 draft ==
Round	Pick #	Overall	Name	Position	College
2	23	55	Peter Konz	Center	Wisconsin
3	28	91	Lamar Holmes	Offensive Tackle	Southern Miss
5	23	158	Bradie Ewing	Fullback	Wisconsin
5	29	164	Jonathan Massaquoi	Linebacker	Troy
6	22	192	Charles Mitchell	Safety	Mississippi State
7	42	249	Travian Robertson	Defensive Tackle	South Carolina

== 2013 draft ==
Round	Pick #	Overall	Name	Position	College
1	22	22	Desmond Trufant	Cornerback	Washington
2	28	60	Robert Alford	Cornerback	Southeastern Louisiana
4	30	127	Malliciah Goodman	Defensive End	Clemson
4	36	133	Levine Toilolo	Tight End	Stanford
5	20	153	Stansly Maponga	Defensive End	TCU
7	37	243	Kemal Ishmael	Safety	Central Florida
7	38	244	Zeke Motta	Safety	Notre Dame
7	43	249	Sean Renfree	Quarterback	Duke

== 2014 draft ==
Round	Pick #	Overall	Name	Position	College
1	6	6	Jake Matthews	Offensive Tackle	Texas A&M
2	5	37	Ra'Shede Hageman	Defensive Tackle	Minnesota
3	4	68	Dezmen Southward	Safety	Wisconsin
4	3	103	Devonta Freeman	Running Back	Florida State
4	39	139	Prince Shembo	Linebacker	Notre Dame
5	7	147	Ricardo Allen	Cornerback	Purdue
5	28	168	Marquis Spruill	Linebacker	Syracuse
7	38	253	Yawin Smallwood	Linebacker	Connecticut
7	40	255	Tyler Starr	Linebacker	South Dakota

== 2015 draft ==
Round	Pick #	Overall	Name	Position	College
1	8	8	Vic Beasley	Linebacker	Clemson
2	10	42	Jalen Collins	Cornerback	LSU
3	9	73	Tevin Coleman	Running Back	Indiana
4	8	107	Justin Hardy	Wide Receiver	East Carolina
5	1	137	Grady Jarrett	Defensive Tackle	Clemson
7	8	225	Jake Rodgers	Offensive Tackle	Eastern Washington
7	32	249	Akeem King	Defensive Back	San Jose State

== 2016 draft ==
Round	Pick #	Overall	Name	Position	College
1	17	17	Keanu Neal	Safety	Florida
2	21	52	Deion Jones	Linebacker	LSU
3	18	81	Austin Hooper	Tight End	Stanford
4	17	115	De'Vondre Campbell	Linebacker	Minnesota
6	20	195	Wes Schweitzer	Guard	San Jose State
7	17	238	Devin Fuller	Wide Receiver	UCLA

== 2017 draft ==
Round	Pick #	Overall	Name	Position	College
1	26	26	Takkarist McKinley	Defensive End	UCLA
3	11	75	Duke Riley	Linebacker	LSU
4	30	136	Sean Harlow	Guard	Oregon State
5	5	149	Damontae Kazee	Cornerback	San Diego State
5	12	156	Brian Hill	Running Back	Wyoming
5	31	174	Eric Saubert	Tight End	Drake

== 2018 draft ==
Round	Pick #	Overall	Name	Position	College
1	26	26	Calvin Ridley	Wide Receiver	Alabama
2	26	58	Isaiah Oliver	Cornerback	Colorado
3	26	90	Deadrin Senat	Defensive Tackle	South Florida
4	26	126	Ito Smith	Running Back	Southern Miss
6	20	194	Russell Gage	Wide Receiver	LSU
6	26	200	Foyesade Oluokun	Linebacker	Yale

== 2019 draft ==
Round	Pick #	Overall	Name	Position	College
1	14	14	Chris Lindstrom	Guard	Boston College
1	31	31	Kaleb McGary	Offensive Tackle	Washington
4	9	111	Kendall Sheffield	Cornerback	Ohio State
4	33	135	John Cominsky	Defensive end	Charleston (WV)
5	14	152	Qadree Ollison	Running Back	Pittsburgh
5	34	172	Jordan Miller	Cornerback	Washington
6	31	203	Marcus Green	Wide receiver	Louisiana-Monroe

== 2020 draft ==
Round	Pick #	Overall	Name	Position	College
1	16	16	A. J. Terrell	Cornerback	Clemson
2	15	47	Marlon Davidson	Defensive end	Auburn
3	14	78	Matt Hennessy	Center	Temple
4	13	119	Mykal Walker	Linebacker	Fresno State
4	28	134	Jaylinn Hawkins	Safety	California
7	14	228	Sterling Hofrichter	Kicker	Syracuse

== 2021 draft ==
Round	Pick #	Overall	Name	Position	College
1	4	4	Kyle Pitts	Tight end	Florida
2	8	40	Richie Grant	Safety	UCF
3	4	68	Jalen Mayfield	Offensive tackle	Michigan
4	3	108	Darren Hall	Cornerback	San Diego State
4	8	114	Drew Dalman	Center	Stanford
5	4	148	Ta'Quon Graham	Defensive tackle	Texas
5	38	182	Adetokunbo Ogundeji	Defensive end	Notre Dame
5	39	183	Avery Williams	Cornerback	Boise State
6	3	187	Frank Darby	Wide receiver	Arizona State

== 2022 draft ==
Round	Pick #	Overall	Name	Position	College
1	8	8	Drake London	Wide receiver	USC
2	6	38	Arnold Ebiketie	Defensive end	Penn State
2	26	58	Troy Andersen	Linebacker	Montana State
3	10	74	Desmond Ridder	Quarterback	Cincinnati
3	18	82	DeAngelo Malone	Linebacker	Western Kentucky
5	8	151	Tyler Allgeier	Running back	BYU
6	11	190	Justin Shaffer	Guard	Georgia
6	35	213	John FitzPatrick	Tight end	Georgia

== 2023 draft ==
Round	Pick #	Overall	Name	Position	College
1	8	8	Bijan Robinson	Running back	Texas
2	7	38	Matthew Bergeron	Offensive tackle	Syracuse
3	12	75	Zach Harrison	Defensive end	Ohio State
4	11	113	Clark Phillips III	Cornerback	Utah
7	7	224	DeMarcco Hellams	Safety	Alabama
7	8	225	Jovaughn Gwyn	Guard	South Carolina

== 2024 draft ==
Round	Pick #	Overall	Name	Position	College
1	8	8	Michael Penix Jr.	Quarterback	Washington
2	3	35	Ruke Orhorhoro	Defensive tackle	Clemson
3	10	74	Bralen Trice	Defensive end	Washington
4	9	109	Brandon Dorlus	Defensive end	Oregon
5	8	143	JD Bertrand	Linebacker	Notre Dame
6	10	186	Jase McClellan	Running back	Alabama
6	11	187	Casey Washington	Wide receiver	Illinois
6	21	197	Zion Logue	Defensive tackle	Georgia

== 2025 draft ==
Round	Pick #	Overall	Name	Position	College
1	15	15	Jalon Walker	Defensive end	Georgia
1	26	26	James Pearce Jr.	Defensive end	Tennessee
3	32	96	Xavier Watts	Safety	Notre Dame
4	16	118	Billy Bowman Jr.	Safety	Oklahoma
7	2	218	Jack Nelson	Offensive tackle	Wisconsin

== 2026 draft ==
Round	Pick #	Overall	Name	Position	College
2	16	48	Avieon Terrell	Cornerback	Clemson
3	15	79	Zachariah Branch	Wide receiver	Georgia
4	34	134	Kendal Daniels	Linebacker	Oklahoma
6	27	208	Anterio Thompson	Defensive tackle	Washington
6	34	215	Harold Perkins Jr.	Linebacker	LSU
7	15	231	Ethan Onianwa	Offensive tackle	Ohio State

== See also ==
- History of the Atlanta Falcons
- List of professional American football drafts
