= 1989 Atlanta Falcons season =

NFL team season

- Head coach: Marion Campbell (fired November 28, 3-9 record); Jim Hanifan (interim; 0-4 record)
- Home stadium: Fulton County Stadium

Results
- Record: 3–13
- Division place: 4th NFC West
- Playoffs: Did not qualify
- Pro Bowlers: 1: G Bill Fralic

The 1989 Atlanta Falcons season was the franchise’s 24th season in the National Football League (NFL). The Falcons drafted Deion Sanders with their first round pick in the NFL Draft. Head coach Marion Campbell retired after the twelfth game of the season.

Despite having Sanders in their defensive backfield, the Falcons surrendered 7.59 yards per pass attempt (including quarterback sacks) in 1989, one of the ten worst totals in NFL history.

The latter part of the season was marred by two tragedies. On November 24, rookie offensive tackle Ralph Norwood was killed in an automobile accident eight miles from the Falcons’ training facilities. Just under a month later, on December 19, backup tight end Brad Beckman was also killed in an auto accident. It marked the death of three players of the team in the space of two seasons (the previous year, cornerback David Croudip died of an overdose).

== Offseason ==
=== NFL draft ===
1989 Atlanta Falcons draft
Round	Pick	Player	Position	College	Notes
1	5	Deion Sanders * ^{†}	Cornerback	Florida State	
1	27	Shawn Collins	Wide receiver	Northern Arizona	
2	38	Ralph Norwood	Offensive tackle	LSU	
3	62	Keith Jones	Running back	Illinois	
6	145	Troy Sadowski	Tight end	Georgia	
7	172	Undra Johnson	Running back	West Virginia	
8	202	Paul Singer	Quarterback	Western Illinois	
9	229	Chris Dunn	Linebacker	Cal Poly	
11	286	Greg Paterra	Running back	Slippery Rock	
12	313	Tony Bowick	Defensive tackle	Chattanooga	
Made roster † Pro Football Hall of Fame * Made at least one Pro Bowl during career

=== Undrafted free agents ===
1989 undrafted free agents of note
Player	Position	College
Oscar Angulo	Tight end	Eastern Kentucky
Norris Blount	Cornerback	Baylor
Deon Booker	Running back	Louisville
Ivan Cook	Linebacker	Washington State
Tyreese Knox	Running back	Nebraska
Steve McMillon	Cornerback	Wyoming
Maury Metcalf	Linebacker	Washington State
Mark Millett	Tight end	Southwest Texas State
Kevin Simien	Wide receiver	Fort Hays State
Alonzo Washington	Running back	Arizona

== Personnel ==
=== Staff ===
1989 Atlanta Falcons staff
Front office: Chairman of the board — Rankin M. Smith Sr.; President — Rankin M. Smith, Jr.; Executive vice president — Taylor Smith; Director of player personnel — Ken Herock; Director of pro scouting — Chuck Connor; Head coaches: Head coach — Marion Campbell; Offensive coaches: Assistant head coach/offense — Jim Hanifan; Offensive coordinator — Rod Dowhower; Running backs — Steve Crosby; Receivers — Jimmy Raye; Tight ends — Foge Fazio	Defensive coaches: Assistant head coach/defense — Fred Bruney; Defensive line — Tommy Brasher; Linebackers _ Chuck Clausen; Defensive assistant — Claude Humphrey; Special teams coaches: Special teams — Foge Fazio; Strength and conditioning: Strength and conditioning — Tim Jorgensen

=== Roster ===
1989 Atlanta Falcons roster
Quarterbacks (QB): 10 Scott Campbell; 7 Hugh Millen; 12 Chris Miller; Running backs (RB): 38 Keith Jones; 33 Gene Lang; 36 Greg Paterra; 44 John Settle; Wide receivers (WR): 82 Stacey Bailey; 85 Shawn Collins; 86 Floyd Dixon; 81 Michael Haynes; 89 George Thomas; Tight ends (TE): 80 Ron Heller; 45 Ken Whisenhunt; 87 Gary Wilkins	Offensive linemen (OL): 74 Stan Clayton G; 64 Jamie Dukes C; 79 Bill Fralic G; 69 Houston Hoover T; 68 John Hunter G; 75 Mike Kenn T; 55 Wayne Radloff C; 66 Tommy Robison; Defensive linemen (DL): 70 Tony Bowick DT; 75 Tony Casillas DT; 76 Mike Gann DE; 67 Malcolm Taylor DE; 72 Ben Thomas DE	Linebackers (LB): 93 Aundray Bruce OLB; 51 Marcus Cotton OLB; 99 Tim Green OLB; 59 John Rade ILB; 95 Michael Reid ILB; 53 Galand Thaxton ILB; 58 Jessie Tuggle ILB; 54 Joel Williams OLB; Defensive backs (DB): 23 Bobby Butler CB; 20 Evan Cooper SS; 22 Charles Dimry CB; 41 Tim Gordon FS; 40 Brian Jordan SS; 34 Robert Moore S; 21 Deion Sanders CB; 32 Tony Zackery CB; Special teams (ST): 65 Guy Bingham LS; 5 Greg Davis K; 17 Scott Fulhage P	Practice squad: 28 Undra Johnson RB; 24 Darron Norris RB; 96 Benji Roland DE; 45 Troy Sadowski TE; 83 Kevin Simien WR; 9 Paul Singer QB; Reserve: 77 Rick Bryan DE (IR); 25 Scott Case CB (IR); 3 Rick Donnelly P (PUP); 88 Alex Higdon TE (PUP); 6 Paul McFadden K (IR); 27 Steve McMillon CB (IR); 49 James Primus RB (IR); 37 Elbert Shelley S (IR); Rookies in italics 47 active, 8 reserve, 6 practice squad

== Regular season ==
=== Schedule ===
Week	Date	Opponent	Result	Record	Venue	Attendance
1	September 10	**Los Angeles Rams**	**L** 21–31	0–1	Atlanta–Fulton County Stadium	38,708
2	September 17	Dallas Cowboys	**W** 27–21	1–1	Atlanta–Fulton County Stadium	55,285
3	September 24	at Indianapolis Colts	**L** 9–13	1–2	Hoosier Dome	57,816
4	October 1	at Green Bay Packers	**L** 21–23	1–3	Milwaukee County Stadium	54,647
5	October 8	at **Los Angeles Rams**	**L** 14–26	1–4	Anaheim Stadium	52,182
6	October 15	New England Patriots	**W** 16–15	2–4	Atlanta–Fulton County Stadium	39,697
7	October 22	at Phoenix Cardinals	**L** 20–34	2–5	Sun Devil Stadium	33,894
8	October 29	at **New Orleans Saints**	**L** 13–20	2–6	Louisiana Superdome	65,153
9	November 5	Buffalo Bills	**W** 30–28	3–6	Atlanta–Fulton County Stadium	45,267
10	November 12	at **San Francisco 49ers**	**L** 3–45	3–7	Candlestick Park	59,914
11	November 19	**New Orleans Saints**	**L** 17–26	3–8	Atlanta–Fulton County Stadium	53,173
12	November 26	at New York Jets	**L** 7–27	3–9	Giants Stadium	40,429
13	December 3	**San Francisco 49ers**	**L** 10–23	3–10	Atlanta–Fulton County Stadium	43,128
14	December 10	at Minnesota Vikings	**L** 17–43	3–11	Hubert H. Humphrey Metrodome	58,116
15	December 17	Washington Redskins	**L** 30–31	3–12	Atlanta–Fulton County Stadium	37,501
16	December 24	Detroit Lions	**L** 24–31	3–13	Atlanta–Fulton County Stadium	7,792
Note: Intra-division opponents are in **bold** text.

=== Game summaries ===
==== Week 4: at Green Bay Packers ====
Week 4: Atlanta Falcons at Green Bay Packers

Quarter	1	2	3	4	Total
Falcons	0	20	3	0	**23**
**Packers**	7	0	7	7	**21**

at Milwaukee County Stadium, Milwaukee, Wisconsin

- Date: October 1, 1989
- Game time: 1:00 p.m. EST
- Game weather: Overcast, 76 °F (24 °C)
- Referee: Dick Hantak
- TV announcers (CBS): Tim Ryan and Randy Cross

Game information

**First quarter**

**Second quarter**

**Third quarter**

**Fourth quarter**

Top passers

- ATL – Hugh Millen – 20/29, 294 yards, TD, INT
- GB – Don Majkowski – 19/35, 295 yards, TD, 2 INT

Top rushers

- ATL – John Settle – 15 rushes, 49 yards, TD
- GB – Brent Fullwood – 19 rushes, 84 yards

Top receivers

- ATL – Shawn Collins – 5 receptions, 126 yards
- GB – Perry Kemp – 5 receptions, 80 yards

==== Week 9 ====
Buffalo Bills (6–2) at Atlanta Falcons (2–6)

Team	1	2	3	4	Total
Bills	7	0	14	7	28
• Falcons	0	3	17	10	30

- Date: Sunday November 5, 1989
- Location: Fulton County Stadium — Atlanta, Georgia
- Game start: 1:00pm EST
- Game attendance: 45,267
- Game weather: 56 °F (13.3 °C); wind 7 miles per hour (11 km/h; 6.1 kn)
- Referee: Bob McElwee
- TV announcers (NFL on NBC): Joel Meyers and Paul Maguire

This would be the final win of the season for Atlanta.

=== Standings ===
NFC West
	W	L	T	PCT	DIV	CONF	PF	PA	STK
^{(1)} San Francisco 49ers	14	2	0	.875	5–1	10–2	442	253	W5
^{(5)} Los Angeles Rams	11	5	0	.688	4–2	8–4	426	344	W2
New Orleans Saints	9	7	0	.563	3–3	5–7	386	301	W3
Atlanta Falcons	3	13	0	.188	0–6	1–11	279	437	L7

== Awards and records ==
- Shawn Collins, led all NFL rookie wide receivers in receptions (58)

=== Milestones ===
The Falcons drew a franchise-low attendance of 7,792 for their finale, a 31–24 loss to the Detroit Lions on December 24.
