= 1988 Atlanta Falcons season =

NFL team season

- Head coach: Marion Campbell
- Home stadium: Fulton County Stadium

Results
- Record: 5–11
- Division place: 4th NFC West
- Playoffs: Did not qualify
- Pro Bowlers: 3: G Bill Fralic; FB John Settle; CB Scott Case

The 1988 Atlanta Falcons season was the franchise’s 23rd season in the National Football League (NFL). The team was marred by tragedy when cornerback David Croudip died on October 10 after a cocaine overdose. It would be the first of three player deaths of the team in the space of two seasons.

== Offseason ==
=== NFL draft ===
1988 Atlanta Falcons draft
Round	Pick	Player	Position	College	Notes
1	1	Aundray Bruce	Linebacker	Auburn	
2	28	Marcus Cotton	Linebacker	USC	
3	56	Alex Higdon	Tight end	Ohio State	
5	110	Charles Dimry	Cornerback	UNLV	
6	138	George Thomas	Wide receiver	UNLV	
6	140	Houston Hoover	Guard	Jackson State	
7	166	Michael Haynes	Wide receiver	Northern Arizona	
8	194	Phillip Brown	Linebacker	Alabama	
9	222	James Primus	Running back	UCLA	
10	250	Stan Clayton	Guard	Penn State	
11	278	James Milling	Wide receiver	Maryland	
12	306	Carter Wiley	Safety	Virginia Tech	
Made roster

=== Undrafted free agents ===
1988 undrafted free agents of note
Player	Position	College
Ted Bates	Defensive end	Norfolk State
Chris Clauss	Punter	Penn State
Mark Comalander	Quarterback	Rice
Robert Houghilin	Kicker	Iowa
Danny James	Wide receiver	Morehouse
Gary McGuire	Linebacker	Houston
Vinson Smith	Linebacker	East Carolina

== Personnel ==
=== Staff ===
1988 Atlanta Falcons staff
Front office: Chairman of the board – Rankin M. Smith Sr.; President – Rankin M. Smith, Jr.; Executive vice president – Taylor Smith; Director of player personnel – Ken Herock; Director of pro personnel – Bill Jobko; Head coaches: Head coach – Marion Campbell; Offensive coaches: Assistant head coach/offense – Jim Hanifan; Offensive coordinator – Rod Dowhower; Running backs – Steve Crosby; Receivers – Jimmy Raye; Tight ends – Foge Fazio	Defensive coaches: Assistant head coach/defense – Fred Bruney; Defensive line – Tommy Brasher; Linebackers – Chuck Clausen; Defensive assistant – Claude Humphrey; Special teams coaches: Special teams – Foge Fazio; Strength and conditioning: Strength and conditioning – Tim Jorgensen

=== Roster ===
1988 Atlanta Falcons roster
Quarterbacks (QB): 14 Kerwin Bell; 7 Hugh Millen; 12 Chris Miller; Running backs (RB): 35 Keith Griffin; 33 Gene Lang; 49 James Primus; 42 Gerald Riggs; 44 John Settle; Wide receivers (WR): 82 Stacey Bailey; 85 Lew Barnes; 86 Floyd Dixon; 81 Michael Haynes; 89 Jessie Hester; 84 James Milling; Tight ends (TE): 87 Danzell Lee; 45 Ken Whisenhunt; 80 Gary Wilkins	Offensive linemen (OL): 74 Stan Clayton G; 69 Houston Hoover T; 78 Mike Kenn T; 62 Brett Miller T; 67 Paul Oswald C; 55 Wayne Radloff C; 61 John Scully G; 66 George Yarno; Defensive linemen (DL): 77 Rick Bryan DE; 98 Greg Brown DE/DT; 75 Tony Casillas DT; 76 Mike Gann DE; 94 Charles Martin DE; 73 Mitch Willis DT	Linebackers (LB): 93 Aundray Bruce OLB; 51 Marcus Cotton OLB; 99 Tim Green OLB; 95 Michael Reid ILB; 58 Jessie Tuggle ILB; 54 Joel Williams OLB; Defensive backs (DB): 23 Bobby Butler CB; 25 Scott Case CB; 20 Evan Cooper SS; 22 Charles Dimry CB; 41 Tim Gordon FS; 27 Calvin Loveall CB; 34 Robert Moore SS; 37 Elbert Shelley CB/S; Special teams (ST): 5 Greg Davis K; 3 Rick Donnelly P	Reserve: 53 Phillip Brown LB (IR); 10 Scott Campbell QB (IR); 28 Bret Clark S (IR); 56 Joe Costello DE (IR); 8 Steve Dils QB (IR); 64 Jamie Dukes G (IR); 24 Larry Emery RB (IR); 48 Kenny Flowers RB (IR); 79 Bill Fralic G (IR); 65 Garry Frank G (IR); 88 Alex Higdon TE (IR); 59 John Rade LB (IR); 52 Vinson Smith LB (IR); 29 Sylvester Stamps RB (IR); 35 George Thomas WR (IR); 71 Mitch Young DE (IR); Rookies in italics 47 active, 16 reserve

== Regular season ==
=== Schedule ===
Week	Date	Opponent	Result	Record	Venue	Attendance
1	September 4	at Detroit Lions	**L** 17–31	0–1	Pontiac Silverdome	31,075
2	September 11	**New Orleans Saints**	**L** 21–29	0–2	Atlanta–Fulton County Stadium	48,901
3	September 18	at **San Francisco 49ers**	**W** 34–17	1–2	Candlestick Park	60,168
4	September 25	at Dallas Cowboys	**L** 20–26	1–3	Texas Stadium	39,702
5	October 2	Seattle Seahawks	**L** 20–31	1–4	Atlanta–Fulton County Stadium	28,619
6	October 9	**Los Angeles Rams**	**L** 0–33	1–5	Atlanta–Fulton County Stadium	30,852
7	October 16	at Denver Broncos	**L** 14–30	1–6	Mile High Stadium	75,287
8	October 23	New York Giants	**L** 16–23	1–7	Atlanta–Fulton County Stadium	45,092
9	October 30	at Philadelphia Eagles	**W** 27–24	2–7	Veterans Stadium	60,091
10	November 6	Green Bay Packers	**W** 20–0	3–7	Atlanta–Fulton County Stadium	29,952
11	November 13	San Diego Chargers	**L** 7–10	3–8	Atlanta–Fulton County Stadium	26,329
12	November 20	at Los Angeles Raiders	**W** 12–6	4–8	Los Angeles Memorial Coliseum	40,967
13	November 27	Tampa Bay Buccaneers	**W** 17–10	5–8	Atlanta–Fulton County Stadium	14,020
14	December 4	**San Francisco 49ers**	**L** 3–13	5–9	Atlanta–Fulton County Stadium	44,048
15	December 11	at **Los Angeles Rams**	**L** 7–22	5–10	Anaheim Stadium	42,828
16	December 18	at **New Orleans Saints**	**L** 9–10	5–11	Louisiana Superdome	60,566
Note: Intra-division opponents are in **bold** text.

== Standings ==
NFC West
	W	L	T	PCT	DIV	CONF	PF	PA	STK
San Francisco 49ers^{(2)}	10	6	0	.625	4–2	8–4	369	294	L1
Los Angeles Rams^{(5)}	10	6	0	.625	4–2	8–4	407	293	W3
New Orleans Saints	10	6	0	.625	3–3	6–6	312	283	W1
Atlanta Falcons	5	11	0	.313	1–5	4–8	244	315	L3
