= 1990 Atlanta Falcons season =

NFL team season

- Owner: Rankin Smith
- Head coach: Jerry Glanville
- Home stadium: Fulton County Stadium

Results
- Record: 5–11
- Division place: 4th NFC West
- Playoffs: Did not qualify
- Pro Bowlers: 1: WR Andre Rison

The 1990 Atlanta Falcons season was the franchise's 25th season in the National Football League (NFL). Jerry Glanville was hired to be the team's new coach. The franchise changed their helmets from red to black. Atlanta looked to improve on its 3–13 record from 1989. The team did improve by finishing 5–11, but the Falcons still suffered an eighth consecutive losing season. 1990 started out pretty well for Atlanta, as they beat playoff contenders Houston, New Orleans, and Cincinnati at home. The team sat at 3–4 after their win against Cincinnati. They then lost seven games in a row before winning its last two to end the season. Atlanta went 5–3 at home, but winless on the road, which cost the Falcons a trip to the postseason.

== Offseason ==
=== NFL draft ===
1990 Atlanta Falcons draft
Round	Pick	Player	Position	College	Notes
1	20	Steve Broussard	Running back	Washington State	
2	27	Darion Conner	Linebacker	Jackson State	
3	55	Oliver Barnett	Defensive end	Kentucky	
5	121	Reggie Redding	Guard	Cal State Fullerton	
6	139	Mike Pringle	Running back	Cal State Fullerton	
8	195	Tory Epps	Defensive tackle	Memphis State	
9	222	Darrell Jordan	Linebacker	Northern Arizona	
10	250	Donnie Salum	Linebacker	Arizona	
11	278	Chris Ellison	Defensive back	Houston	
12	305	Shawn McCarthy	Punter	Purdue	
Made roster

=== Undrafted free agents ===
1990 undrafted free agents of note
Player	Position	College
Mark Hopkins	Tight end	Central Michigan

== Personnel ==
=== Staff ===
1990 Atlanta Falcons staff
Front office: Chairman of the board – Rankin M. Smith Sr.; President – Taylor Smith; Vice president of player personnel – Ken Herock; Director of pro scouting – Chuck Connor; Head coaches: Head coach – Jerry Glanville; Offensive coaches: Assistant head coach/offense – Ray Sherman; Quarterbacks – Tom Rossley; Wide receivers – Jimmy Robinson; Tight ends – Keith Rowen; Offensive line – Wayne McDuffie	Defensive coaches: Assistant head coach/defense – Doug Shively; Defensive line – Bill Kollar; Secondary – Jimmy Carr; Special teams coaches: Special teams – Keith Rowen; Strength and conditioning: Strength and conditioning – Tim Jorgensen

=== Roster ===
1990 Atlanta Falcons roster
Quarterbacks (QB): 10 Scott Campbell; 7 Hugh Millen; 14 Gilbert Renfroe; Running backs (RB): 34 Steve Broussard; 43 Tracy Johnson; 38 Keith Jones; 24 Mike Pringle; 30 Mike Rozier; 44 John Settle; Wide receivers (WR): 82 Stacey Bailey; 85 Shawn Collins; 86 Floyd Dixon; 81 Michael Haynes; 80 Andre Rison; 89 George Thomas; Tight ends (TE): 88 Troy Sadowski; 87 Gary Wilkins	Offensive linemen (OL): 64 Jamie Dukes C; 79 Bill Fralic G; 71 Chris Hinton T; 69 Houston Hoover G; 68 John Hunter T; 78 Mike Kenn T; 55 Mike Ruether G; 61 John Scully G; Defensive linemen (DL): 72 Oliver Barnett DE; 77 Rick Bryan DE; 74 Tory Epps NT; 76 Mike Gann DE; 99 Tim Green DE	Linebackers (LB): 93 Aundray Bruce OLB; 56 Darion Conner OLB; 51 Bobby Houston OLB; 54 Robert Lyles OLB; 59 John Rade ILB; 52 Ken Tippins ILB; 58 Jessie Tuggle ILB; Defensive backs (DB): 36 Eric Bergeson CB; 23 Bobby Butler CB; 25 Scott Case FS; 22 Charles Dimry CB; 40 Brian Jordan SS; 21 Deion Sanders CB; 37 Elbert Shelley CB; Special teams (ST): 65 Guy Bingham LS; 5 Greg Davis K; 17 Scott Fulhage P	Practice squad: 27 William Evers CB (IR); 83 Pat Jackson WR; 96 William Kirksey LB; 70 Reggie Redding G; 46 Ricky Royal CB; Reserve: 75 Tony Casillas DE (IR); 12 Chris Miller QB (IR); 84 James Milling WR (IR); 39 Roland Mitchell CB (IR); 95 Michael Reid LB (IR); 91 Donnie Salum LB (IR); 53 Galand Thaxton ILB (IR); Rookies in italics 47 active, 8 reserve, 4 practice squad

== Regular season ==
=== Schedule ===
Week	Date	Opponent	Result	Record	Venue	Attendance
1	September 9	Houston Oilers	**W** 47–27	1–0	Atlanta–Fulton County Stadium	56,222
2	September 16	at Detroit Lions	**L** 14–21	1–1	Pontiac Silverdome	48,691
3	September 23	at **San Francisco 49ers**	**L** 13–19	1–2	Candlestick Park	62,858
4	Bye					
5	October 7	**New Orleans Saints**	**W** 28–27	2–2	Atlanta–Fulton County Stadium	57,401
6	October 14	**San Francisco 49ers**	**L** 35–45	2–3	Atlanta–Fulton County Stadium	57,921
7	October 21	at **Los Angeles Rams**	**L** 24–44	2–4	Anaheim Stadium	54,761
8	October 28	Cincinnati Bengals	**W** 38–17	3–4	Atlanta–Fulton County Stadium	53,214
9	November 4	at Pittsburgh Steelers	**L** 9–21	3–5	Three Rivers Stadium	57,093
10	November 11	at Chicago Bears	**L** 24–30	3–6	Soldier Field	62,855
11	November 18	Philadelphia Eagles	**L** 23–24	3–7	Atlanta–Fulton County Stadium	53,755
12	November 25	at **New Orleans Saints**	**L** 7–10	3–8	Louisiana Superdome	68,629
13	December 2	at Tampa Bay Buccaneers	**L** 17–23	3–9	Tampa Stadium	42,839
14	December 9	Phoenix Cardinals	**L** 13–24	3–10	Atlanta–Fulton County Stadium	36,222
15	December 16	at Cleveland Browns	**L** 10–13	3–11	Cleveland Stadium	46,536
16	December 23	**Los Angeles Rams**	**W** 20–13	4–11	Atlanta–Fulton County Stadium	30,021
17	December 30	Dallas Cowboys	**W** 26–7	5–11	Atlanta–Fulton County Stadium	50,097
Note: Intra-division opponents are in **bold** text.

=== Standings ===
NFC West
	W	L	T	PCT	DIV	CONF	PF	PA	STK
^{(1)} San Francisco 49ers	14	2	0	.875	4–2	10–2	353	239	W1
^{(6)} New Orleans Saints	8	8	0	.500	4–2	6–6	274	275	W2
Los Angeles Rams	5	11	0	.313	2–4	3–9	345	412	L4
Atlanta Falcons	5	11	0	.313	2–4	3–9	348	365	W2
