= List of UNLV Rebels in the NFL draft =

This is a list of UNLV Rebels football players in the NFL draft.

== Key ==
B	Back	K	Kicker	NT	Nose tackle
C	Center	LB	Linebacker	FB	Fullback
DB	Defensive back	P	Punter	HB	Halfback
DE	Defensive end	QB	Quarterback	WR	Wide receiver
DT	Defensive tackle	RB	Running back	G	Guard
E	End	T	Offensive tackle	TE	Tight end

== Selections ==
Year	Round	Pick	Player	Team	Position
1972	16	403	Nate Hawkins	Pittsburgh Steelers	WR
1975	5	108	Mike Thomas	Washington Redskins	RB
1975	10	251	Steve Haggerty	Denver Broncos	WR
1976	7	185	Joe Ingersoll	Miami Dolphins	G
1977	2	54	Glenn Carano	Dallas Cowboys	QB
1977	7	190	Reggie Haynes	Washington Redskins	TE
1977	7	193	Blanchard Carter	Baltimore Colts	T
1978	10	263	Ray Strong	Atlanta Falcons	RB
1979	2	55	Aaron Mitchell	Dallas Cowboys	DB
1979	5	117	Cleveland Jackson	New York Giants	TE
1979	9	225	Henry Vereen	Tampa Bay Buccaneers	WR
1980	4	99	Ron Crews	Cleveland Browns	DE
1980	7	178	Bobby Batton	New York Jets	RB
1980	10	275	Brett Davis	Tampa Bay Buccaneers	RB
1981	4	84	Sam Greene	Miami Dolphins	WR
1981	8	216	Art Plunkett	Los Angeles Rams	T
1981	9	225	Admiral Dewey Larry	New York Jets	DB
1982	4	99	Todd Liebenstein	Washington Redskins	DE
1982	9	240	John Higgins	New York Giants	DB
1982	12	325	Michael Morton	Tampa Bay Buccaneers	RB
1984	7	175	Kirk Dodge	Atlanta Falcons	LB
1985	2	37	Randall Cunningham	Philadelphia Eagles	QB
1985	8	205	Tom Polley	Philadelphia Eagles	LB
1988	2	31	Ickey Woods	Cincinnati Bengals	RB
1988	5	110	Charles Dimry	Atlanta Falcons	DB
1988	6	138	George Thomas	Atlanta Falcons	WR
1990	6	150	Don Odegard	Cincinnati Bengals	DB
1991	12	326	Keenan McCardell	Washington Redskins	WR
1993	5	135	Lonnie Palelei	Pittsburgh Steelers	G
1994	6	184	Jerry Reynolds	Cincinnati Bengals	T
1995	7	235	Henry Bailey	Pittsburgh Steelers	WR
1999	6	185	Talance Sawyer	Minnesota Vikings	DE
2000	5	155	Quincy Sanders	Washington Redskins	DB
2002	2	60	Anton Palepoi	Seattle Seahawks	DE
2002	4	131	Sam Brandon	Denver Broncos	DB
2002	6	176	Kevin Thomas	Buffalo Bills	DB
2002	7	261	Ahmad Miller	Houston Texans	DT
2004	7	243	Dominic Furio	Philadelphia Eagles	C
2005	5	149	Adam Seward	Carolina Panthers	LB
2005	5	170	Ryan Claridge	New England Patriots	LB
2007	2	53	Eric Wright	Cleveland Browns	DB
2008	4	104	Beau Bell	Cleveland Browns	LB
2009	5	169	Frank Summers	Pittsburgh Steelers	RB
2010	4	117	Joe Hawley	Atlanta Falcons	G
2025	7	238	Ricky White	Seattle Seahawks	WR
