= List of Western Illinois Leathernecks in the NFL draft =

This is a list of Western Illinois Leathernecks football players in the NFL draft.

== Key ==
B	Back	K	Kicker	NT	Nose tackle
C	Center	LB	Linebacker	FB	Fullback
DB	Defensive back	P	Punter	HB	Halfback
DE	Defensive end	QB	Quarterback	WR	Wide receiver
DT	Defensive tackle	RB	Running back	G	Guard
E	End	T	Offensive tackle	TE	Tight end

== Selections ==
Year	Round	Pick	Overall	Player	Team	Position
1952	29	9	346	Art Hudson	Detroit Lions	B
1961	20	1	267	Mike McFarland	Minnesota Vikings	QB
1962	1	11	11	Leroy Jackson	Cleveland Browns	B
1966	6	7	87	Wayne DeSutter	Detroit Lions	T
1966	13	9	194	Jim Jackson	San Francisco 49ers	RB
1970	15	6	370	Ron Wilson	St. Louis Cardinals	WR
1971	11	8	268	Mike Wagner	Pittsburgh Steelers	DB
1974	5	1	105	John Teerlinck	San Diego Chargers	DT
1974	10	21	255	Dennis Morgan	Dallas Cowboys	RB
1974	17	10	426	Marvin Williams	New Orleans Saints	WR
1975	9	25	233	John Passananti	Minnesota Vikings	G
1975	15	10	374	Rich Lavin	San Francisco 49ers	TE
1977	11	22	301	Greg Lee	St. Louis Cardinals	DB
1977	12	17	324	Scott Levenhagen	Denver Broncos	TE
1978	8	17	211	Bill Miller	Cincinnati Bengals	T
1978	12	7	313	Greg Lawson	New York Giants	RB
1979	10	7	255	Jerry Holloway	St. Louis Cardinals	TE
1981	3	16	72	Don Greco	Detroit Lions	G
1981	12	3	307	Mike Maher	New York Giants	TE
1982	10	28	279	Tim Barbian	San Francisco 49ers	DT
1987	10	25	276	Frank Winters	Cleveland Browns	C
1989	8	7	202	Paul Singer	Atlanta Falcons	QB
1989	8	16	211	Marlin Williams	Seattle Seahawks	DE
1990	12	7	311	Gene Benhart	Indianapolis Colts	QB
1991	5	2	113	Bryan Cox	Miami Dolphins	LB
1991	8	28	223	Lamar McGriggs	New York Giants	DB
1992	11	3	283	John Earle	Cincinnati Bengals	T
1994	5	14	145	Rodney Harrison	San Diego Chargers	DB
1999	5	25	158	David Bowens	Denver Broncos	DE
2001	3	16	78	William James	New York Giants	DB
2001	4	31	126	Edgerton Hartwell	Baltimore Ravens	LB
2003	5	14	149	Mike Scifres	San Diego Chargers	P
2009	3	5	69	Jason Williams	Dallas Cowboys	LB
2019	3	20	84	Khalen Saunders	Kansas City Chiefs	DT

== See also ==
- Western Illinois Leathernecks football
- Western Illinois Leathernecks
- Western Illinois University
