= Michael Haynes (wide receiver) =

American football player (born 1965)

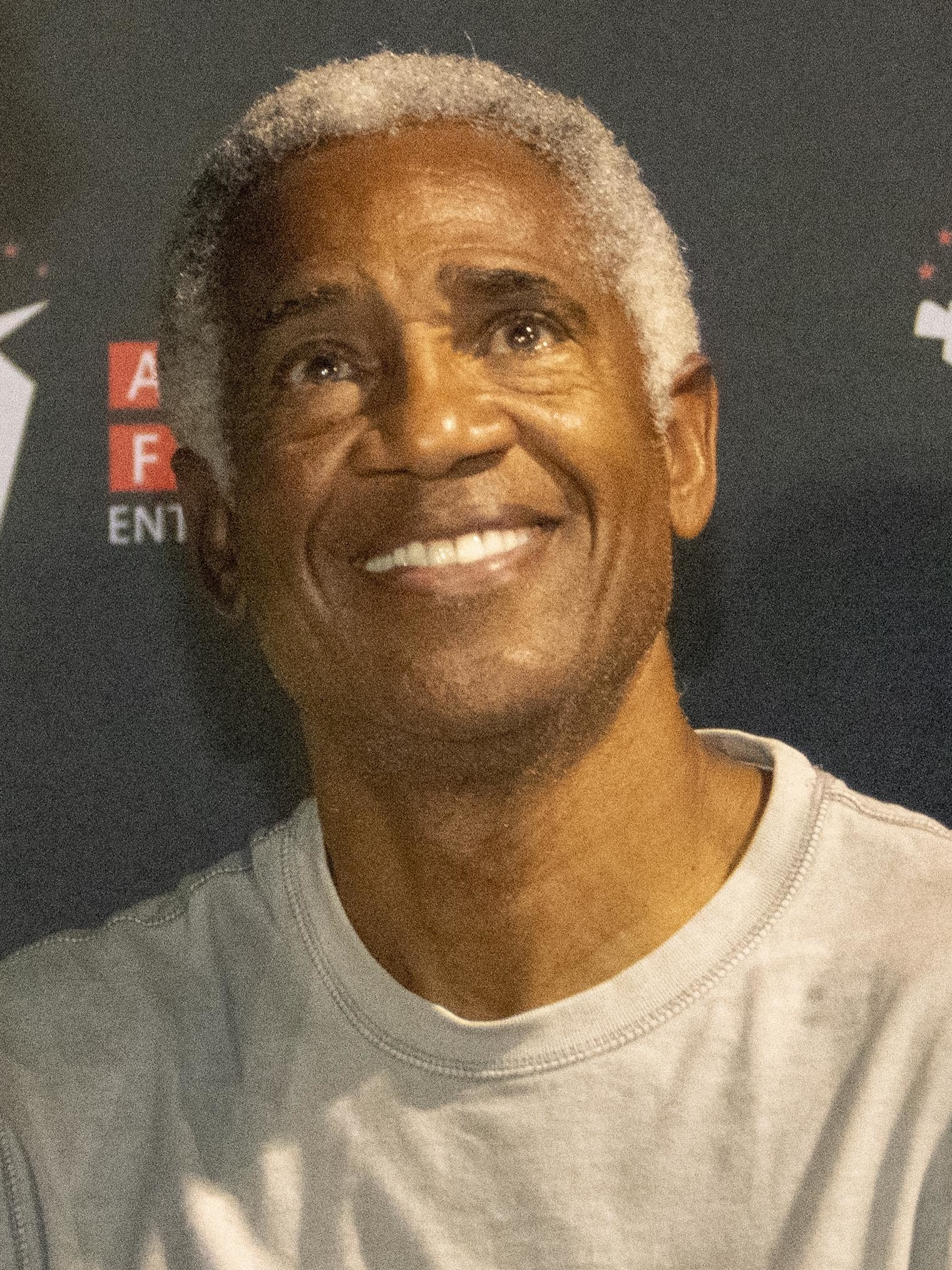

No. 81, 82
- Position: Wide receiver

Personal information
- Born: December 24, 1965 (age 60); New Orleans, Louisiana, U.S.
- Listed height: 6 ft 0 in (1.83 m)
- Listed weight: 184 lb (83 kg)

Career information
- High school: Joseph S. Clark (New Orleans)
- College: Northern Arizona; Eastern Arizona College
- NFL draft: 1988: 7th round, 166th overall pick

Career history
- Atlanta Falcons (1988–1993); New Orleans Saints (1994–1996); Atlanta Falcons (1997)

Career NFL statistics
- Receptions: 428
- Receiving yards: 6,588
- Receiving touchdowns: 47
- Stats at Pro Football Reference

Michael David Haynes (born December 24, 1965) is an American former professional football player who was a wide receiver in the National Football League (NFL). He was selected by the Atlanta Falcons in the seventh round of the 1988 NFL draft. He played college football for the Northern Arizona Lumberjacks after attending Eastern Arizona College. Haynes also played for the New Orleans Saints.

== Professional career ==
The Atlanta Falcons selected Haynes in the seventh round (166th overall) of the 1988 NFL draft. Haynes was the 16th wide receiver drafted in 1988.

On September 11, 1988, Haynes made his professional regular season debut and made his first reception on a 12-yard pass by Chris Miller as the Falcons lost 29–21 against the New Orleans Saints. On October 30, 1988, Haynes made his first career touchdown reception on a 19-yard pass by Chris Miller during the second quarter of a 27–24 victory at the Philadelphia Eagles in Week 9. He finished the game with two receptions for 68 receiving yards and two touchdowns receptions. He finished his rookie season in 1988 with 13 receptions for 232 receiving yards and four touchdown receptions in 15 games.

== NFL career statistics ==
Legend
	Led the league
**Bold**	Career high

=== Regular season ===
Year	Team	Games		Receiving				
Year	Team	GP	GS	Rec	Yds	Avg	Lng	TD
1988	ATL	15	6	13	232	17.8	49	4
1989	ATL	13	11	40	681	17.0	72	4
1990	ATL	13	10	31	445	14.4	60	0
1991	ATL	**16**	**16**	50	**1,122**	**22.4**	80	**11**
1992	ATL	14	14	48	808	16.8	89	10
1993	ATL	**16**	**16**	72	778	10.8	**98**	4
1994	NO	**16**	**16**	**77**	985	12.8	78	5
1995	NO	**16**	15	41	597	14.6	48	4
1996	NO	**16**	10	44	786	17.9	51	4
1997	ATL	12	0	12	154	12.8	24	1
Career		147	114	428	6,588	15.4	98	47
