= Stacey Bailey =

American football player (born 1960)

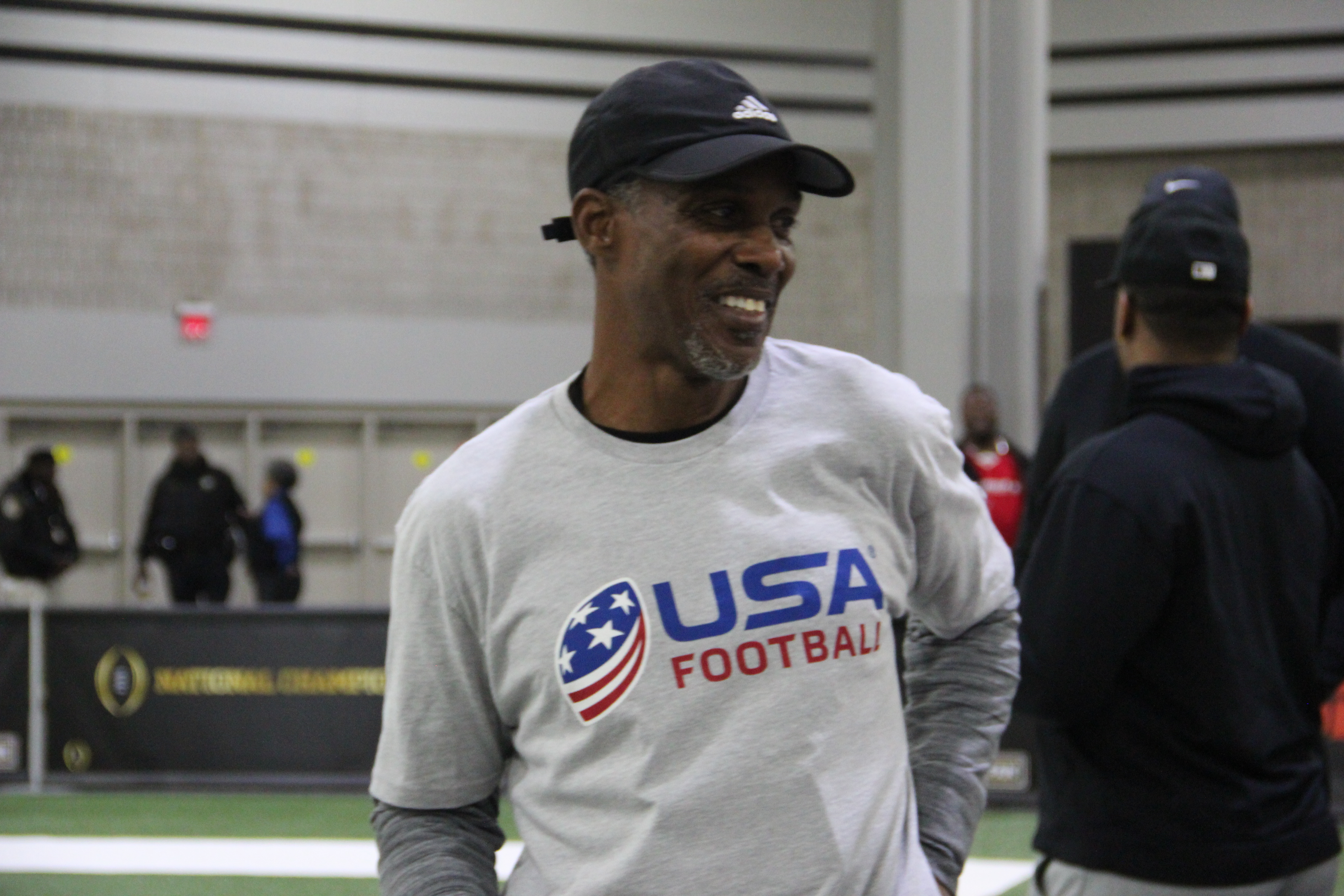
- Bailey in 2018

No. 82
- Position: Wide receiver

Personal information
- Born: February 10, 1960 (age 66); San Rafael, California, U.S.
- Listed height: 6 ft 0 in (1.83 m)
- Listed weight: 162 lb (73 kg)

Career information
- High school: Terra Linda (San Rafael)
- College: San Jose State
- NFL draft: 1982: 3rd round, 63rd overall pick

Career history
- Atlanta Falcons (1982–1990); Los Angeles Rams (1991)*
- * Offseason or practice squad member only

Career NFL statistics
- Receptions: 206
- Receiving yards: 3,422
- Touchdowns: 18
- Stats at Pro Football Reference

Stacey Dwayne Bailey (born February 10, 1960) is an American former professional football player who was a wide receiver in the National Football League (NFL). He played college football for the San Jose State Spartans. He was selected in the third round of the 1982 NFL draft by the Atlanta Falcons.

== Early life ==
Bailey attended Terra Linda High School in San Rafael, California and was a letterman in football. He then attended San Jose State University. As a freshman in 1978, he appeared in 12 games. He recorded 23 receptions for 354 yards. As a sophomore in 1979, he appeared in 11 games. He recorded 44 receptions for 674 yards and three touchdowns. In 1980, as a junior, he appeared in 11 games. He recorded 30 receptions for 686 yards and four touchdowns. For the season, he was named All-Conference. As a senior in 1981, he appeared in 12 games. He recorded 27 receptions for 517 yards and six touchdowns. He was also named an All-American as well as All-Conference.

=== Career statistics ===
Season			Receiving				
Year	Team	GP	Rec	Yds	Avg	Lng.	TD
1978	SJS	12	23	654	15.4	--	0
1979	SJS	11	44	674	15.3	--	3
1980	SJS	11	30	686	22.9	--	4
1981	SJS	12	27	517	19.1	--	6
Career		46	124	2,231	18.0	--	13

== Professional career ==
Bailey was selected in the third round (63rd overall) of the 1982 NFL draft by the Atlanta Falcons. As a rookie, he appeared in five games. He recorded two receptions for 24 yards and one touchdown. In 1983, he appeared in 14 games (12 starts). He recorded 55 receptions for 881 yards and six touchdowns. The following season, 1984 was statistically his best, as well as only full 16-game season. He started all 16 games, and recorded 67 receptions for 1,138 yards and six touchdowns. In 1985, he appeared in 15 games (13 starts). He recorded 30 receptions for 364 yards. In 1986, he appeared in six games (one start). He recorded three receptions for 39 yards. In 1987, he appeared in seven games (six starts). He recorded 20 receptions for 325 yards and three touchdowns. In 1988, he started all 10 games he appeared in. He recorded 17 receptions for 437 yards and, the final two touchdowns of his career. In 1989, he appeared in 15 games. He recorded eight receptions for 170 yards. In 1990, he appeared in just three games (one start). He recorded four receptions for 44 yards before his season was ended by an injury, in October 1990. He was released in September 1990 during final cuts.

=== Career statistics ===
Season				Receiving				
Year	Team	GP	GS	Rec	Yds	Avg	Lng.	TD
1982	ATL	5	0	2	24	12.0	15	0
1983	ATL	14	12	55	881	16.0	53	6
1984	ATL	16	16	67	1,138	17.0	61	6
1985	ATL	15	12	30	364	12.1	31	0
1986	ATL	6	1	3	39	13.0	21	0
1987	ATL	7	6	20	325	16.3	35	3
1988	ATL	10	10	17	437	25.7	68	2
1989	ATL	15	0	8	170	21.3	41	0
1990	ATL	3	1	4	44	11.0	13	0
Career		91	59	206	3,422	16.6	65	18

== Personal life ==
As of 2017, Bailey is an instructor at Football University. His son, Sean, was a wide receiver for the University of Georgia.
