= Aundray Bruce =

American football player (born 1966)

No. 93, 83, 56, 99
- Position: Linebacker

Personal information
- Born: April 30, 1966 (age 60); Montgomery, Alabama, U.S.
- Listed height: 6 ft 5 in (1.96 m)
- Listed weight: 270 lb (122 kg)

Career information
- High school: Carver (Montgomery)
- College: Auburn
- NFL draft: 1988: 1st round, 1st overall pick

Career history
- Atlanta Falcons (1988–1991); Los Angeles / Oakland Raiders (1992–1998)

Awards and highlights
- PFWA All-Rookie Team (1988); Consensus All-American (1987); 2× First-team All-SEC (1986, 1987); 1987 Citrus Bowl MVP

Career NFL statistics
- Tackles: 275
- Sacks: 32
- Interceptions: 4
- Fumble recoveries: 3
- Stats at Pro Football Reference

Aundray Bruce (born April 30, 1966) is an American former professional football player who was a linebacker in the National Football League (NFL). As a college football player, he played defensive end for the Auburn Tigers before the Atlanta Falcons selected him with the first overall pick in the 1988 NFL draft. He played in the NFL for the Falcons and Los Angeles/Oakland Raiders.

== Early life ==
Bruce was born in Montgomery, Alabama. He attended George Washington Carver High School in Montgomery. A high school phenom, Bruce started at tight end and outside linebacker. He also returned kicks and played four additional positions on offense (quarterback, running back, wide receiver, offensive tackle) and four other positions on defense (defensive tackle, defensive end, nose guard, cornerback). While he excelled in football, basketball was Bruce's first love. He led George Washington Carver High School to the 4-A basketball state championship in both his junior and senior years. As a senior, he was named the state tournament's MVP and won an All-Star game dunk contest.

== College career ==
Bruce was named All-Southeastern Conference in 1986 and 1987, All-American in 1987, and Citrus Bowl MVP in 1987. He first garnered national attention in a game in 1987 against Georgia Tech by intercepting three passes and returning one for a touchdown and making 10 unassisted tackles. Entering the NFL Draft, he was saddled with expectations of becoming the next Lawrence Taylor, though once drafted was described as "unquestionably the least heralded No. 1 draft choice this decade." He graduated from Auburn in 1988 as an education major.

== Professional career ==
Bruce was drafted with the first overall pick in the 1988 NFL draft by the Atlanta Falcons. Bruce enjoyed his most prominent role on the Falcons 1991 playoff team when he saw spot duty on offense as a tight end as well as defense. He signed with the Los Angeles Raiders as a free agent in 1992 and finished his career with the organization. Bruce played in 151 games over his 11-season career, posting 32 sacks and 4 interceptions. While Bruce concluded his career with a 7-season tenure in Oakland, he is typically regarded as a draft bust. Despite being the #1 overall pick, he never made an All-Pro or Pro Bowl team, never had double-figure sack totals in a season, and only started 42 games. He only played for two playoff teams in his long career.

== NFL career statistics ==
Year	Team	GP	Interceptions			Fumbles				Tackles	
Year	Team	GP	Int	Yds	TD	FF	FR	Yds	TD	Sck	Cmb
1988	ATL	16	2	10	0	2	1	0	0	6.0	70
1989	ATL	16	1	0	0	2	0	0	0	6.0	66
1990	ATL	16	0	0	0	4	0	0	0	4.0	40
1991	ATL	14	0	0	0	0	0	0	0	0.0	0
1992	LAR	16	0	0	0	0	0	0	0	3.5	23
1993	LAR	16	0	0	0	0	0	0	0	2.0	11
1994	LAR	16	0	0	0	0	1	0	0	0.0	5
1995	OAK	14	1	1	1	1	0	0	0	5.5	30
1996	OAK	16	0	0	0	0	1	3	0	4.0	21
1997	OAK	10	0	0	0	0	0	0	0	1.0	9
1998	OAK	1	0	0	0	0	0	0	0	0.0	0
Career		151	4	11	1	9	3	3	0	32.0	275

== Coaching career ==
Bruce is currently a defensive line coach for the Faulkner University Eagles in Montgomery, Alabama.
