= Bobby Butler (American football) =

American football player (born 1959)

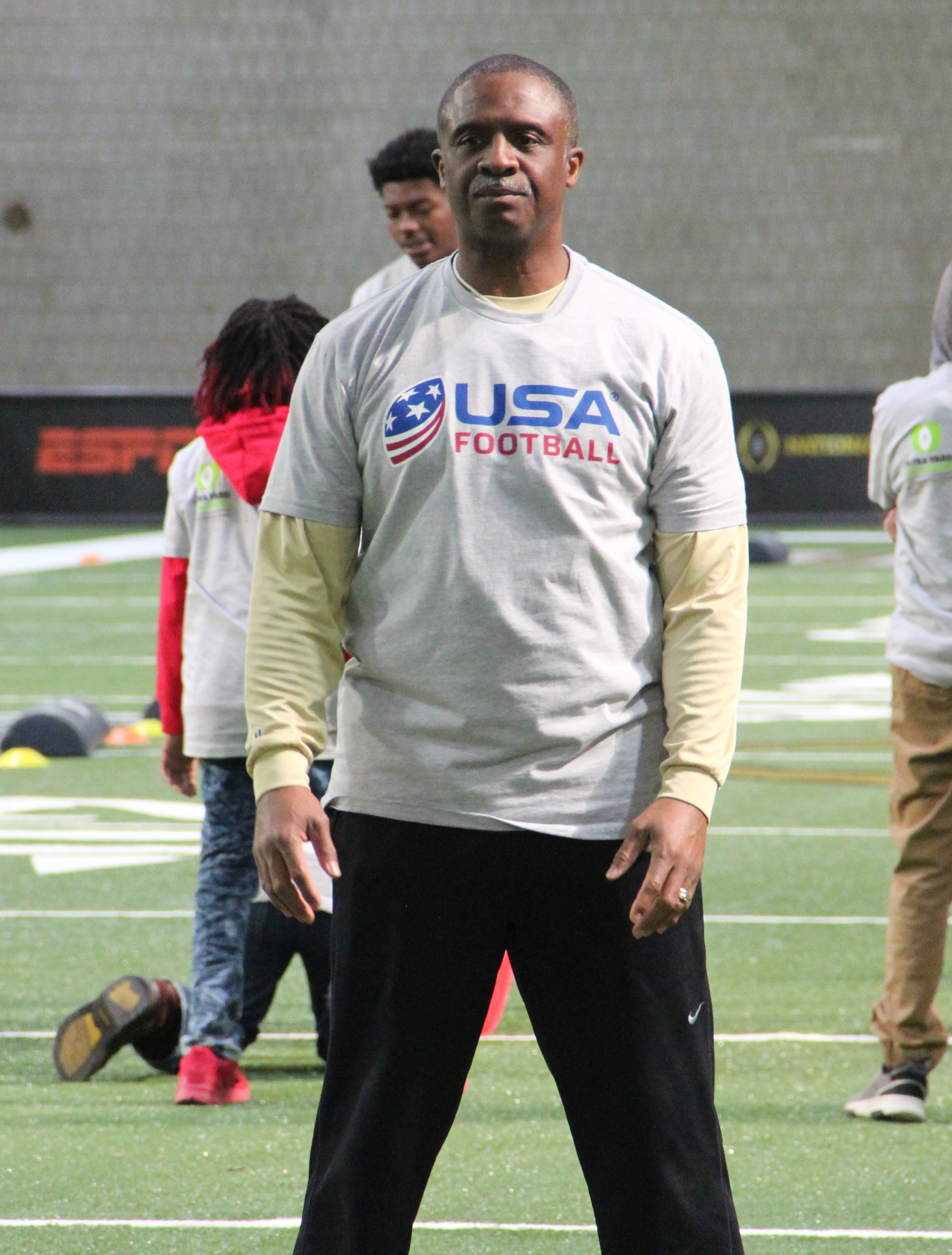
- Butler in 2018

No. 23
- Position: Cornerback

Personal information
- Born: May 28, 1959 (age 67); Delray Beach, Florida, U.S.
- Listed height: 5 ft 11 in (1.80 m)
- Listed weight: 174 lb (79 kg)

Career information
- High school: Atlantic Community (Delray Beach)
- College: Florida State
- NFL draft: 1981: 1st round, 25th overall pick

Career history
- Atlanta Falcons (1981–1992)

Awards and highlights
- Third-team All-American (1980)

Career NFL statistics
- Interceptions: 27
- Fumble recoveries: 9
- Touchdowns: 4
- Stats at Pro Football Reference

Robert Calvin Butler (born May 28, 1959) is an American former professional football player who was a cornerback for the Atlanta Falcons of the National Football League (NFL). Butler played college football for the Florida State Seminoles. Butler also competed for the Florida State Seminoles track and field team as a sprinter.

Butler was selected 25th overall in the first round of the 1981 NFL draft by the Falcons. He played 12 seasons in the NFL, all with the Falcons, retiring after the 1992 season.

Butler was inducted into the Seminoles' Hall of Fame in 1987.

== NFL Career Statistics ==
Legend
**Bold**	Career high

=== Regular season ===
Year	Team	Games		Interceptions					Fumbles				
Year	Team	GP	GS	Int	Yds	Avg	Lng	TD	FF	FR	Yds	Avg	TD
1981	ATL	**16**	**16**	**5**	**86**	17.2	**41**	0	-	0	0	0.0	0
1982	ATL	9	9	2	0	0.0	0	0	-	0	0	0.0	0
1983	ATL	**16**	**16**	4	12	3.0	12	0	-	0	1	0.0	0
1984	ATL	15	15	2	25	12.5	25	0	-	1	10	10.0	0
1985	ATL	**16**	**16**	**5**	-4	-0.8	0	0	-	0	0	0.0	0
1986	ATL	7	7	1	33	**33.0**	33	**1**	-	0	0	0.0	0
1987	ATL	12	12	4	48	12.0	31	0	-	0	0	0	0
1988	ATL	**16**	**16**	1	22	22.0	22	0	-	**3**	29	9.7	0
1989	ATL	**16**	11	0	0	0.0	0	0	0	1	29	29.0	**1**
1990	ATL	**16**	6	3	0	0.0	0	0	0	2	0	0.0	**1**
1991	ATL	15	2	0	0	0.0	0	0	0	1	**39**	**39.0**	0
1992	ATL	15	0	0	0	0.0	0	0	0	0	0	0.0	0
Career		169	127	27	222	8.2	41	1	0	9	107	11.9	2

=== Postseason ===
Year	Team	Games		Interceptions					Fumbles					
Year	Team	GP	GS	Int	Yds	Avg	Lng	TD	FF	FR	Yds	Avg	Lng	TD
1982	ATL	1	**1**	0	0	0.0	0	0	-	0	0	0.0	0	0
1991	ATL	**2**	0	0	0	0.0	0	0	0	0	0	0.0	0	0
Career		3	1	0	0	0.0	0	0	0	0	0	0.0	0	0

== Personal life ==
Butler has a wife named Cyrillyn and four sons: Brenton, Brice, Brelan, and Brandel. Brenton played basketball for the Fordham Rams and later played professional basketball in Berlin, Germany, for RSV Eintracht Stahnsdorf. Brice played several seasons as a wide receiver in the NFL. Brelan is an accomplished video editor and still/film photographer.

In 2017, Butler completed his degree in social science from Florida State University, 37 years after leaving the school for the NFL.
