= John Hunter (American football) =

American football player (born 1965)

No. 68
- Position: Offensive tackle

Personal information
- Born: August 16, 1965 (age 61); Roseburg, Oregon, U.S.
- Listed height: 6 ft 8 in (2.03 m)
- Listed weight: 294 lb (133 kg)

Career information
- High school: North Bend
- College: BYU
- NFL draft: 1989: 3rd round, 80th overall pick

Career history
- Minnesota Vikings (1989)*; Atlanta Falcons (1989–1991); Tampa Bay Buccaneers (1992)*; Seattle Seahawks (1992)
- * Offseason or practice squad member only

Career NFL statistics
- Games played: 26
- Games started: 6
- Stats at Pro Football Reference

John Rosel Hunter (born August 16, 1965) is an American former professional football player who was an offensive tackle in the National Football League (NFL) for four seasons. He played college football for the BYU Cougars and was selected by the Minnesota Vikings in the third round of the 1989 NFL draft.

== Professional career ==
=== Minnesota Vikings ===
Hunter was selected by the Minnesota Vikings in the third round of the 1989 NFL draft (80th overall), but never saw action as a member of the team.

=== Atlanta Falcons ===
Hunter signed with the Atlanta Falcons for the final four games of the 1989 season. The next season, Hunter started the first three games of the season, but suffered a hip injury; he missed one game and spent the rest of the season as a reserve. In 1991, Hunter played just two games, spending most of the season on injured reserve.

=== Seattle Seahawks ===
In the 1992 season, Hunter played in five games for the Seattle Seahawks, starting three games.
