= Olympiada of Spoken Russian =

US high school competition

The Olympiada of Spoken Russian is an annual series of state and regional competitions held for high school students of Russian in the United States, sponsored by the American Council of Teachers of Russian (ACTR). It is the oldest secondary school activity put on by this association, beginning in the 1960s. "Olympiada" means olympiad in Russian.

== Format ==
The format for the Olympiada comes from the Soviet Student Olympiads.

There are three sections to the Olympiada:

1. About yourself
  A conversation is carried on, where the interviewer asks the student questions, often about themselves, and the student answers. The student has access to the questions in advance, in order to prepare answers. On the lowest level, questions include "What is your name?" and "Where do you live?"; on the highest level, students are expected to describe themselves and their friends in detail, and discuss abstract ideas such as the nature of art.
2. Cultural knowledge
  A section of each preparatory packet contains texts about Russia and Russian culture. The student is expected to be familiar with the material, and able to answer questions about it. On the lowest level, this includes basic geography; on the highest level, texts about famous Russian literary figures are included.
3. Text/poem
  The preparatory packets include a selection of narrative texts and poems adapted to the student's expected ability level. Each student must prepare one narrative text, and be ready to read it aloud and answer questions about it. They must also memorize and recite a poem from the packet. The memorization requirement is a recent addition; in the past, the poem was treated the same as the text. At the lowest level, the poetry is adapted to suit the students' abilities, but at the highest level the student must memorize a full poem in the original by such famous Russian poets as Pushkin, Akhmatova, and Tsvetaeva.

== Levels ==
There are six levels in the Olympiada. Four correspond to the level of ability expected of a student after their first, second, third, or fourth year of language study. This allows students in all years of the standard 9th - 12th grade high school to participate. There is a fifth level for heritage learners of the language, who went to the United States before age 11, and a sixth level for native speakers, including those who went to the United States at age 11 or later.

== Scoring ==
Students are given a score between 60 and 100 for each section, and the section scores are averaged to get the student's final score. Medals are awarded as follows:

- Gold medal: 90-100 points
- Silver medal: 80-89 points
- Bronze medal: 70-79 points
- Honorable mention: 60-69 points

== Regions ==
The number of Russian programs in American high schools has been steadily decreasing since the end of the Cold War. As a result, not all states have their own Olympiadas, nor are all regions are covered by the multi-state Olympiadas. The states and regions currently offering Olympiadas are as follows

- Alaska (Central and Southeastern)
- Delaware Valley
- Illinois-Indiana
- Maryland
- Minnesota
- New England
- New Jersey
- New York
- Ohio
- Oklahoma
- Tennessee-Mississippi
- Texas
- Virginia
- Washington-Oregon

== Awards ==
As part of the registration fee, ACTR provides "medals" for each participant, based on score. Each region may choose to give out its own award to the highest-scoring student, although this is not required. The University of Washington, which sponsors the Washington–Oregon competition, awards the Nora Holdsworth Scholarship (full tuition to the University of Washington Summer Russian program). Each year, the top finalists from each region are invited to the Olympiada Study Abroad Program, which includes a homestay in Vladimir, Russia. The program includes language and culture classes and tours in the region of the Golden Ring. ACTR greatly subsidizes this trip, making it possible for students who would otherwise not be able to afford it. The number of finalists invited from each region depends on the number of students competing. Students in the highest level and heritage speakers are eligible; native speakers are not. Only one finalist is allowed per school; students who have been finalists before are not allowed to win a second time.

Every three years (2001, 2004, 2007...) the top finalists are invited to be part of the US delegation to the International Olympiada of Spoken Russian held in Moscow. After the competition, the students continue to the homestay in Vladimir.

== See also ==
Olympiada of Spoken Russian for Heritage Speakers

Starting from 2009, Malenkaya Kompaniya (ru:Маленькая компания (журнал)), literary magazine for Russian-speaking children in US, together with the ACTR and the Slavic Department of the Columbia University, organizes annual Olympiadas of Spoken Russian for Heritage Speakers. Participants are children from Russian-speaking and mixed families who do not study Russian in American middle or high schools.
