= Reggie Redding (American football) =

American football player (born 1968)

No. 70
- Positions: Guard, tackle

Personal information
- Born: September 22, 1968; Cincinnati, Ohio, U.S.
- Died: November 27, 2023 (aged 55); Cincinnati, Ohio, U.S.
- Listed height: 6 ft 3 in (1.91 m)
- Listed weight: 298 lb (135 kg)

Career information
- High school: Forest Park (Cincinnati)
- College: Cal State-Fullerton
- NFL draft: 1990: 5th round, 121st overall pick

Career history
- Atlanta Falcons (1990–1991); New England Patriots (1992)

Career NFL statistics
- Games played: 27
- Games started: 14
- Fumble recoveries: 2
- Stats at Pro Football Reference

Reginald James Redding (September 22, 1968 – November 27, 2023) was an American professional football offensive lineman who played two seasons in the National Football League (NFL) with the Atlanta Falcons and New England Patriots. He was selected by the Falcons in the fifth round of the 1990 NFL draft. He played college football at Laney College and California State University, Fullerton.

== Early life and college ==
Reginald James Redding was born on September 22, 1968, in Cincinnati, Ohio. He attended Forest Park High School in Cincinnati.

He played college football at Laney College from 1986 to 1987 and for the Cal State Fullerton Titans of California State University, Fullerton from 1988 to 1989.

== Professional career ==
Redding was selected by the Atlanta Falcons in the fifth round, with the 121st overall pick, of the 1990 NFL draft. He officially signed with the team on July 9, 1990. He was placed on injured reserve on September 4, 1990, and spent the entire season there. Redding played in 13 games for the Falcons in 1991 and was listed as an offensive tackle. He also appeared in two playoff games that year.

On January 28, 1992, the Falcons traded Redding to the New England Patriots for a 1992 fifth round draft pick and a 1993 conditional draft pick. He became a free agent on February 1, 1992, and re-signed with the Patriots on May 15, 1992. He played in 14 games, all starts, during the 1992 season before being placed on injured reserve on December 24, 1992. Redding was released by the Patriots on July 17, 1993.

== Personal life ==
Redding died on November 27, 2023, in Cincinnati.
