= Floyd Dixon (American football) =

American football player (born 1964)

No. 86, 84
- Position: Wide receiver

Personal information
- Born: April 9, 1964 (age 62); Beaumont, Texas, U.S.
- Listed height: 5 ft 9 in (1.75 m)
- Listed weight: 170 lb (77 kg)

Career information
- High school: Hebert (Beaumont)
- College: S.F. Austin
- NFL draft: 1986: 6th round, 154th overall pick

Career history
- Atlanta Falcons (1986–1991); Philadelphia Eagles (1992); Washington Redskins (1992)*
- * Offseason or practice squad member only

Career NFL statistics
- Receptions: 184
- Receiving yards: 2,523
- Touchdowns: 16
- Stats at Pro Football Reference

Floyd Eugene Dixon (born April 9, 1964) is an American former professional football player who was a wide receiver for seven seasons in the National Football League (NFL) with the Atlanta Falcons and Philadelphia Eagles. He played college football for the Stephen F. Austin Lumberjacks and was selected in the sixth round of the 1986 NFL draft.

== NFL career statistics ==
Legend
**Bold**	Career high

=== Regular season ===
Year	Team	Games		Receiving				
Year	Team	GP	GS	Rec	Yds	Avg	Lng	TD
1986	ATL	**16**	12	**42**	**617**	14.7	**65**	2
1987	ATL	12	12	36	600	**16.7**	51	**5**
1988	ATL	14	**14**	28	368	13.1	36	2
1989	ATL	**16**	5	25	357	14.3	53	2
1990	ATL	**16**	2	38	399	10.5	34	4
1991	ATL	10	3	12	146	12.2	23	1
1992	PHI	7	0	3	36	12.0	19	0
Career		91	48	184	2,523	13.7	65	16

=== Playoffs ===
Year	Team	Games		Receiving				
Year	Team	GP	GS	Rec	Yds	Avg	Lng	TD
1991	ATL	2	1	3	23	7.7	11	0
Career		2	1	3	23	7.7	11	0
