= Chris Miller (quarterback) =

American gridiron football player and coach (born 1965)

- Miller with the Toronto Argonauts in 2026

Toronto Argonauts
- Title: Quarterbacks coach

Personal information
- Born: August 9, 1965 (age 61); Pomona, California, U.S.
- Listed height: 6 ft 2 in (1.88 m)
- Listed weight: 212 lb (96 kg)

Career information
- Position: Quarterback (No. 12, 13, 10)
- High school: Sheldon (Eugene, Oregon)
- College: Oregon
- NFL draft: 1987: 1st round, 13th overall pick

Career history

Playing
- Atlanta Falcons (1987–1993); Los Angeles / St. Louis Rams (1994–1995); Denver Broncos (1999)

Coaching
- South Eugene HS (OR) (2001–2006) Head coach; Arizona Cardinals (2009–2011) Quarterbacks coach; South Eugene HS (OR) (2013) Head coach; West Linn HS (OR) (2014–2019) Head coach; Houston Roughnecks (2020) Offensive coordinator; West Linn HS (OR) (2020–2022) Head coach; Toronto Argonauts (2026–present) Quarterbacks coach

Awards and highlights
- Pro Bowl (1991); 2× First-team All-Pac-10 (1985, 1986)

Career NFL statistics
- Passing attempts: 2,892
- Passing completions: 1,580
- Completion percentage: 54.6%
- TD–INT: 123–102
- Passing yards: 19,320
- Passer rating: 74.9
- Stats at Pro Football Reference

Christopher James Miller (born August 9, 1965) is an American football coach and former player. He is the quarterbacks coach for the Toronto Argonauts of the Canadian Football League (CFL). He played professionally as a quarterback in the National Football League (NFL). Miller played college football for the Oregon Ducks and was selected by the Atlanta Falcons in the first round of the 1987 NFL draft with the 13th overall pick. He also played in the NFL for the Los Angeles / St. Louis Rams and Denver Broncos.

== Early life ==
Born in Pomona, California, Miller was raised in Oregon. He attended Sheldon High School in Eugene, Oregon. He was star athlete in three sports: baseball, football and basketball.

== College athlete ==
Miller attended University of Oregon where he played quarterback for the Oregon Ducks football team. He was considered a risky recruit for higher ranked college teams due to concerns about a knee injury he suffered in high school. His 6,681 career yards and 42 touchdowns were school records when he left for the NFL. In 1999, he was inducted into the athletic Hall of Fame.

== Professional career ==
Pre-draft measurables
Height	Weight	40-yard dash	10-yard split	20-yard split	20-yard shuttle	Vertical jump
6 ft 1 3/8 in (1.86 m)	190 lb (86 kg)	4.74 s	1.60 s	2.68 s	4.35 s	30.5 in (0.77 m)
All values from NFL Combine

Miller was drafted in the first round by the moribund Atlanta Falcons in 1987 as the third of four quarterbacks (Vinny Testaverde, Kelly Stouffer, and Jim Harbaugh) selected in the first round. In a season that saw the team use five quarterbacks where Scott Campbell had the most playing time, Miller started the last two games of a 3–12 season. He threw four interceptions in both his debut against San Francisco and his next game against Detroit, although he did record his first touchdown pass in the former. Miller was tapped to be the starter for the 1988 season. Injuries would limit him to 13 starts and a 5–8 record while throwing 11 touchdowns to 12 interceptions on 2,133 yards.

The next season saw him play 15 games and throw for 3,459 yards with 16 touchdowns to 10 interceptions while leading the league in interception percentage (1.9%) although Atlanta went 3–12. Miller started the first 12 games of the 1990 season and threw for 2,735 yards with 17 touchdowns to 14 interceptions but went 3–9. 1991 would be his best season as a starter. In fourteen starts, the Falcons went 9–5 with Miller under center while throwing for 3,103 yards with 26 touchdowns to 18 interceptions. The Falcons qualified for the postseason that year for the first time in nine years. In the Wild Card Round against the New Orleans Saints on the road, he threw 18-of-30 for 291 yards with three touchdowns and one interception in a 27–20 victory for their first playoff victory since 1978. In the Divisional Round matchup against Washington, he went 17-of-32 for 178 yards with four interceptions as the Falcons lost 24–7 to the eventual Super Bowl champions.

Miller was mired by injury in 1992, playing in just eight games (having a 15:6 TD/INT ratio) that year while having a career-high throw for 89 yards during the season. He tore his ACL at the Georgia Dome when his spikes were caught in the turf. The next year saw him start just two games and go 0–2 before he tore the same ACL against Pittsburgh. He moved to the Los Angeles Rams as a free agent in 1994. He served as the starter for 10 games and threw for 2,104 yards with 16 touchdowns to 14 interceptions. The 1995 season was his last as a general starter, where he went 7–6 while throwing for 2,623 yards with 18 touchdowns to 15 interceptions. After being released by the Rams in the offseason, he elected to retire, having suffered five concussions in the span of 14 months.

In 1999, Miller was recruited to serve in the quarterbacks room of the Denver Broncos, who had rookie Brian Griese and Bubby Brister after the retirement of John Elway in the offseason. Miller wound up starting three games for the team, going 2–1 with 527 passing yards combined. A collision during a run-fake on Monday Night game against Oakland saw him suffer a concussion that convinced him that it was best to retire for good in January 2000. He was inducted into the Oregon Sports Hall of Fame in 2005.

== Career statistics ==
=== NFL ===
Legend
	Led the league
**Bold**	Career high

==== Regular season ====
Year	Team	Games			Passing									Rushing					Sacks	
Year	Team	GP	GS	Record	Cmp	Att	Pct	Yds	Y/A	Lng	TD	Int	Rtg	Att	Yds	Avg	Lng	TD	Sck	Yds
1987	ATL	3	2	0–2	39	92	42.4	552	6.0	57	1	9	26.4	4	21	5.3	11	0	5	37
1988	ATL	13	13	5–8	184	351	52.4	2,133	6.1	68	11	12	67.3	31	138	4.5	**29**	**1**	24	207
1989	ATL	**15**	**15**	3–12	**280**	**526**	53.2	**3,459**	6.6	72	16	10	76.1	10	20	2.0	7	0	**41**	**318**
1990	ATL	12	12	3–9	222	388	57.2	2,735	7.0	75	17	14	78.7	26	99	3.8	18	**1**	26	167
1991	ATL	**15**	14	**9–5**	220	413	53.3	3,103	**7.5**	80	**26**	**18**	80.6	**32**	**229**	**7.2**	20	0	23	145
1992	ATL	8	8	3–5	152	253	**60.1**	1,739	6.9	**89**	15	6	**90.7**	23	89	3.9	16	0	16	103
1993	ATL	3	2	0–2	32	66	48.5	345	5.2	32	1	3	50.4	2	11	5.5	6	0	8	62
1994	RAM	13	10	2–8	173	317	54.6	2,104	6.6	54	16	14	73.6	20	100	5.0	16	0	28	193
1995	STL	13	13	7–6	232	405	57.3	2,623	6.5	72	18	15	76.2	22	67	3.0	13	0	31	244
1999	DEN	3	3	2–1	46	81	56.8	527	6.5	42	2	1	79.6	8	40	5.0	13	0	7	51
Career		98	92	34–58	1,580	2,892	54.6	19,320	6.7	89	123	102	74.9	178	814	4.6	29	2	209	1,527

==== Playoffs ====
Year	Team	Games			Passing									Rushing					Sacks	
Year	Team	GP	GS	Record	Cmp	Att	Pct	Yds	Y/A	Lng	TD	Int	Rtg	Att	Yds	Avg	Lng	TD	Sck	Yds
1991	ATL	2	2	1–1	35	62	56.5	469	7.6	61	3	5	63.2	4	18	4.5	12	0	9	64
Career		2	2	1–1	35	62	56.5	469	7.6	61	3	5	63.2	4	18	4.5	12	0	9	64

=== College ===
Season	Team	GP	Passing						
Season	Team	GP	Cmp	Att	Pct	Yds	TD	Int	Rtg
1983	Oregon	3	17	41	41.5	229	2	3	89.8
1984	Oregon	11	145	289	50.2	1,712	10	10	104.4
1985	Oregon	11	182	329	55.3	2,237	18	13	122.6
1986	Oregon	11	216	356	60.7	2,503	12	13	123.6
College career		34	560	1,015	55.2	6,681	42	39	116.4

== Coaching career ==
Miller was the head coach for South Eugene High School in Eugene, Oregon, from 2001 to 2006. He was also the quarterback coach for the Arizona Cardinals from 2009 to 2011. In 2013, Miller returned to South Eugene as head coach. In 2014, he was named the head football coach at West Linn High School.

Before the 2019 season, Miller announced he would depart West Linn at year's end to join the Houston Roughnecks of the XFL as offensive coordinator.

In May 2020, he was named head coach of Franklin High School in Portland, Oregon. He never coached a game for the Lightning, however, as his former position at West Linn opened up a few weeks later and Miller returned to the Lions on July 8, 2020.

It was announced on January 8, 2026, that Miller had joined the Toronto Argonauts to serve as the team's quarterbacks coach.
