= Undra Johnson =

American football player (born 1966)

No. 29, 28, 27
- Position: Running back

Personal information
- Born: January 8, 1966 (age 60); Valdosta, Georgia, U.S.
- Listed height: 5 ft 9 in (1.75 m)
- Listed weight: 199 lb (90 kg)

Career information
- High school: Stranahan (Fort Lauderdale, Florida)
- College: West Virginia
- NFL draft: 1989: 7th round, 172nd overall pick

Career history
- Atlanta Falcons (1989)*; New Orleans Saints (1989); Dallas Cowboys (1989); Atlanta Falcons (1989)*; Dallas Cowboys (1991)*; San Antonio Riders (1991)
- * Offseason or practice squad member only
- Stats at Pro Football Reference

Undra Jerome Johnson (born January 8, 1966) is an American former professional football running back in the National Football League (NFL) for the Atlanta Falcons, New Orleans Saints, and Dallas Cowboys.

== Early life ==
Johnson played high school football at Stranahan High School in Fort Lauderdale, Florida.

== College career ==
Johnson played college football at West Virginia University in 1985 and played backup his freshman season, behind John Holifield. Johnson rushed for 257 yards and a touchdown that season.

In the 1986 season, Johnson's sophomore year, he beat out Holifield for the starting job at running back. He rushed for a team-high 652 yards and five touchdowns that season, as the Mountaineers went 4–7.

As a junior in 1987, Johnson played backup again, this time to A. B. Brown. Johnson and the Mountaineers, led by the freshman star Major Harris at quarterback, went 6–6. Johnson rushed for 593 yards and four touchdowns that season, behind Brown's 1,000 yards.

In Johnson's final season as a Mountaineer, 1988, the team went undefeated for the first time in school history. Johnson shared time at halfback with Brown. Johnson was again second on the team rushing to Brown, this time with 709 rushing yards and 11 touchdowns.

== Professional career ==
Johnson was drafted in the seventh round (172 overall) in the 1989 NFL draft by the Atlanta Falcons. He played one game for the Falcons and five games for the New Orleans Saints in the 1989 NFL season.

== Personal ==
Johnson made an appearance at the 2007 West Virginia vs. East Carolina football game as an honorary captain for the Mountaineers.

Today, Johnson resides in the southern suburbs of Pittsburgh, where he works as a Financial Advisor and Branch Manager at UBS.
