= Galand Thaxton =

English football player (born 1964)

No. 53, 56
- Position: Linebacker

Personal information
- Born: October 23, 1964 (age 62); Mildenhall, Suffolk, England
- Listed height: 6 ft 1 in (1.85 m)
- Listed weight: 242 lb (110 kg)

Career information
- High school: Denver (CO) South
- College: Wyoming

Career history
- New York Giants (1988)*; Atlanta Falcons (1989-1990); San Diego Chargers (1991)
- * Offseason or practice squad member only

Awards and highlights
- Third-team All-American (1987); WAC Newcomer of the Year (1984)
- Stats at Pro Football Reference

Galand Thaxton (born October 23, 1964) is a former American football linebacker. He played for the Atlanta Falcons in 1989 and for the San Diego Chargers in 1991.
