= John Rade =

American football player (born 1960)

No. 59
- Position: Linebacker

Personal information
- Born: August 31, 1960 (age 66); Ceres, California, U.S.
- Listed height: 6 ft 1 in (1.85 m)
- Listed weight: 214 lb (97 kg)

Career information
- High school: Buena (Sierra Vista, Arizona)
- College: Boise State, Modesto JC
- NFL draft: 1983: 8th round, 215th overall pick

Career history
- Atlanta Falcons (1983–1992)

Awards and highlights
- PFWA All-Rookie Team (1983)

Career NFL statistics
- Sacks: 10.5
- Fumble recoveries: 6
- Interceptions: 3
- Stats at Pro Football Reference

John Anthony Rade (born August 31, 1960) is an American former professional football player who was a linebacker in the National Football League (NFL) from 1983 to 1991 with the Atlanta Falcons.

Born in Ceres, California, Rade graduated from Buena High School in Sierra Vista, Arizona. He attended Modesto Junior College and transferred to Boise State University and played for the Broncos in 1981 and 1982. He was an eighth-round draft choice in 1983, 215th overall. In 1988, Rade led Atlanta in tackles with 137 for the second straight year. He had four 100-plus tackle seasons in six years. Rade played for the Atlanta Falcons from 1983 to 1991, posting a career high 145 tackles in 1990.

Rade served as assistant football coach and defensive coordinator at Wood River High School in Hailey, Idaho, with head football coach, Mike Glenn, before taking the job of athletic and activities director in 2007—first working for a year-and-a-half as assistant AD under athletic director Ron Martinez.

He is believed to be one of the longest-serving Wood River High athletic and activity directors, possibly the longest with nine full years on the director job. In 2009, Rade was named 4th District 5A/4A “Athletic Director of the Year.” He submitted his letter of resignation to principal John Pearce on Thursday, July 14. Rade's resignation was effective July 18.
