= Robert Moore (American football) =

American football player (born 1964)

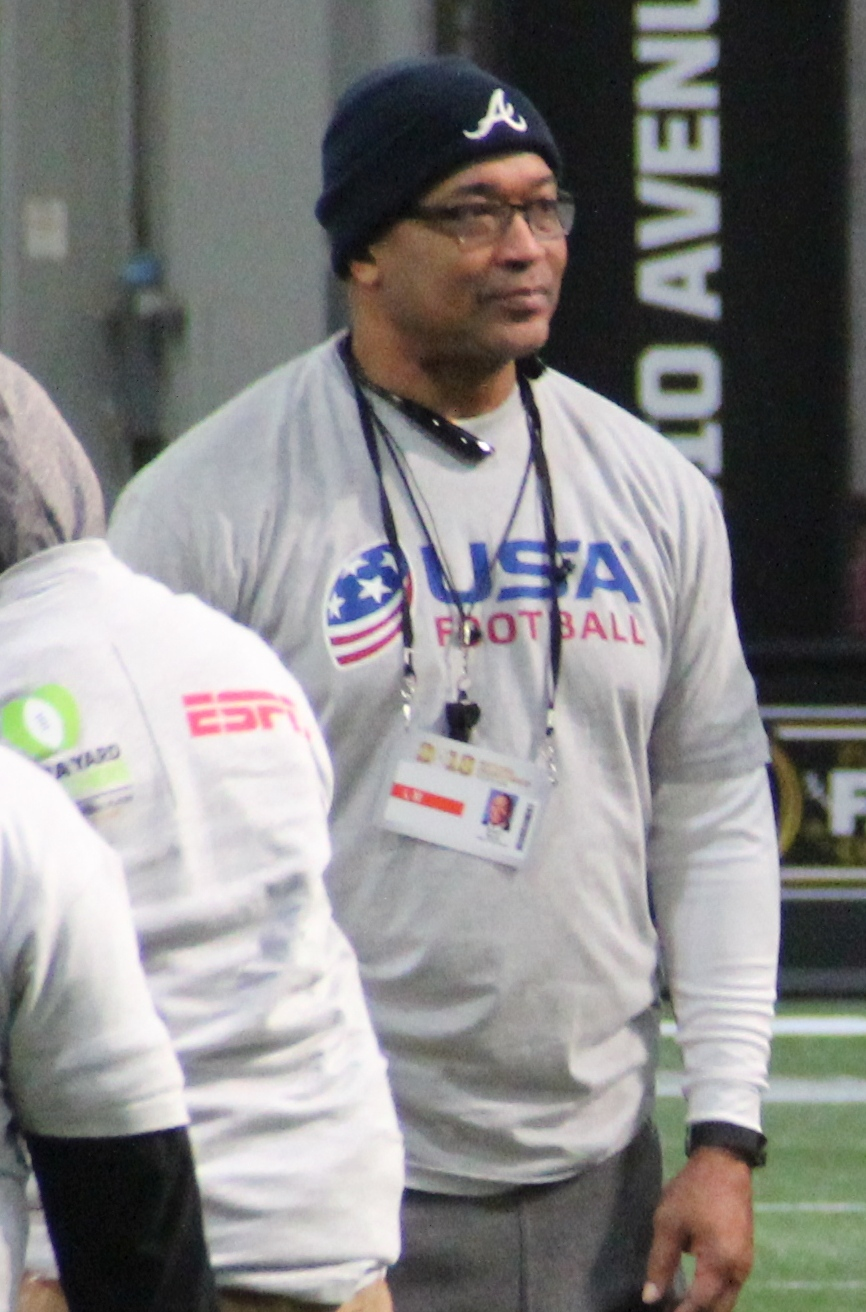
- Moore in 2018

No. 34
- Position: Safety

Personal information
- Born: August 15, 1964 (age 62); Shreveport, Louisiana, U.S.
- Listed height: 5 ft 11 in (1.80 m)
- Listed weight: 190 lb (86 kg)

Career information
- High school: Captain Shreve (Shreveport)
- College: Northwestern State
- NFL draft: 1986: undrafted

Career history
- Atlanta Falcons (1986–1989)

Career NFL statistics
- Games played - started: 60 - 43
- Sacks: 1
- Interceptions: 8
- Stats at Pro Football Reference

Robert Anthony Moore (born August 15, 1964) is an American former professional football player who was a safety for four seasons with the Atlanta Falcons of the National Football League (NFL). He played college football for the Northwestern State Demons. Moore currently coaches Varsity Football for the Pace Academy Knights in Atlanta.
