= Alex Higdon =

American football player (born 1966)

No. 88
- Position: Tight end

Personal information
- Born: September 9, 1966 (age 60); Cincinnati, Ohio, U.S.
- Listed height: 6 ft 5 in (1.96 m)
- Listed weight: 247 lb (112 kg)

Career information
- High school: Princeton (Sharonville, Ohio)
- College: Ohio State
- NFL draft: 1988: 3rd round, 56th overall pick

Career history
- Atlanta Falcons (1988–1990)

Career NFL statistics
- Receptions: 3
- Receiving yards: 60
- Touchdowns: 2
- Stats at Pro Football Reference

Alex Higdon (born September 9, 1966) is an American former professional football player who was a tight end in the National Football League (NFL). He played college football at Ohio State University and professional football in the National Football League (NFL) with the Atlanta Falcons for two years.

== Early life and career ==
Higdon played football, baseball, basketball and track for the perennial athletic power Princeton High School in Sharonville, Ohio, where he was inducted into the school's Hall of Fame. He starred at tight end on the 1983 State Champion football team which ranked number two in USA Today's National High School Football Final Rankings. Among the many awards received during his senior year, Higdon was the 1983 Ohio Lineman of the Year and named a Consensus First-team All-American by USA Today, Parade, and Adidas. Higdon also excelled academically as he was awarded the silver medal at the 1983 and 1984 Ohio State Championship Language Competition Olympiada of Spoken Russian.

Higdon was a member of one of Ohio State football's most successful recruiting classes in its history. Cris Carter, Chris Spielman, and Tom Tupa joined Higdon as the most heralded 1984 recruits as all four were consensus High School All-Americans and all four went on to play professional football in the NFL. Higdon played tight end and linebacker with the Buckeyes from the years 1984 through 1987. Spielman commented during a 2010 radio interview that Higdon was one of the most talented athletes with whom he had ever played. Despite lettering all four years and attaining All-Big Ten Status his senior season, Higdon's collegiate career was curtailed by multiple injuries during his tenure with the Buckeyes.

Higdon was an honor student with a 3.85 GPA in pre-medicine, political science, and Russian studies. As a perennial All-Academic Selection and the recipient of Ohio State's Scholar-Athlete Award in 1988, Higdon abandoned his candidacy for the Rhodes Scholarship choosing instead to leave college early to prepare for the 1988 NFL Scouting Combine and subsequent NFL draft.

Despite tearing wrist ligaments which cut short his senior season, the Atlanta Falcons chose Higdon in the third round as the 56th overall pick in the 1988 NFL draft largely on the strength of his performances at the 1988 Senior Bowl and the NFL Scouting Combine where he ran a 4.54 second 40-yard dash time and completed 28 repetitions of 225 pounds on the bench press.

Higdon's NFL career began in a most promising fashion as he led the NFL in touchdown percentage over the first three games of his rookie season in 1988. His fortunes were quickly reversed, however, when he sustained a season ending ACL injury while catching a pass during the third game of the season against the San Francisco 49ers. During an accelerated rehabilitation regimen just three months after his initial surgery, Higdon severely damaged his ACL, MCL, and LCL ligaments while participating in a supervised workout. In an attempt to repair his knee and restart his career, Higdon underwent three additional knee operations which failed to restore his ability to compete at the professional level. His career officially ended in 1990.

== Post-career ==
After his NFL career was concluded, Higdon became a licensed corporate, clinical, and sport psychologist who currently resides in Atlanta, Georgia. As a corporate psychologist for Echelon Management International, Higdon works with senior-level executives in several areas including performance management, team development, selection and leadership succession. As a clinical psychologist, he works with families, couples, and individuals. As a sport psychologist, Higdon works with professional and collegiate using psychological skills training.
