= Gary Wilkins =

American football player (born 1963)

No. 34, 87, 80
- Position: Tight end

Personal information
- Born: November 23, 1963 (age 62); West Palm Beach, Florida, U.S.
- Listed height: 6 ft 1 in (1.85 m)
- Listed weight: 235 lb (107 kg)

Career information
- High school: Twin Lakes (West Palm Beach)
- College: Georgia Tech

Career history
- Buffalo Bills (1986–1987); Atlanta Falcons (1988–1991)

Career statistics
- Receptions: 42
- Receiving yards: 584
- Receiving touchdowns: 6
- Stats at Pro Football Reference

Gary Wilkins (born November 23, 1963) is an American former professional football player who was a tight end for six seasons in the National Football League (NFL) with the Buffalo Bills and Atlanta Falcons. He played college football for the Georgia Tech Yellow Jackets.
