= James Milling =

American football player (born 1965)

No. 84, 87
- Position: Wide receiver

Personal information
- Born: February 14, 1965 (age 61); Winnsboro, South Carolina, U.S.
- Listed height: 5 ft 9 in (1.75 m)
- Listed weight: 156 lb (71 kg)

Career information
- High school: Potomac (Oxon Hill, Maryland)
- College: Maryland
- NFL draft: 1988: 11th round, 278th overall pick

Career history
- Atlanta Falcons (1988, 1990); New York Giants (1991); Atlanta Falcons (1992); Green Bay Packers (1993)

Career NFL statistics
- Receptions: 26
- Receiving yards: 252
- Touchdowns: 1
- Stats at Pro Football Reference

James Thomas Milling Jr. (born February 14, 1965) is an American former professional football player who was a wide receiver in the National Football League (NFL). He played three seasons for the Atlanta Falcons. He was selected by the Falcons in the tenth round of the 1988 NFL draft with the 278th overall pick. He played college football for the Maryland Terrapins.
