= Troy Sadowski =

American football player (born 1965)

No. 88, 87, 84, 83, 46, 89
- Position: Tight end

Personal information
- Born: December 8, 1965 (age 60); Atlanta, Georgia, U.S.
- Listed height: 6 ft 5 in (1.96 m)
- Listed weight: 255 lb (116 kg)

Career information
- High school: Chamblee (GA)
- College: Georgia
- NFL draft: 1989: 6th round, 145th overall pick

Career history
- Atlanta Falcons (1989–1990); Kansas City Chiefs (1991); New York Jets (1992); (1993); Cincinnati Bengals (1994–1996); Pittsburgh Steelers (1997–1998); Jacksonville Jaguars (1998); Washington Redskins (1999)*
- * Offseason or practice squad member only

Awards and highlights
- First-team All-American (1988)

Career NFL statistics
- Receptions: 23
- Receiving yards: 152
- Return yards: 7
- Stats at Pro Football Reference

Troy Robert Sadowski (born December 8, 1965) is an American former professional football player who was a tight end in the National Football League (NFL). He played college football for the Georgia Bulldogs. A sixth round selection of the 1989 NFL draft, Sadowski played for the Atlanta Falcons (1990), Kansas City Chiefs (1991), New York Jets (1992–1993), Cincinnati Bengals (1994–1996), Pittsburgh Steelers (1997–1998), and Jacksonville Jaguars (1998).
