= James Primus =

American football player (born 1964)

No. 49
- Position: Running back

Personal information
- Born: April 18, 1964 (age 62); Yuma, Arizona, U.S.
- Listed height: 5 ft 11 in (1.80 m)
- Listed weight: 196 lb (89 kg)

Career information
- High school: Sweetwater (National City, California)
- College: UCLA
- NFL draft: 1988: 9th round, 222nd overall pick

Career history
- Atlanta Falcons (1988–1989)

Career NFL statistics
- Rushing yards: 95
- Rushing average: 2.7
- Touchdowns: 1
- Stats at Pro Football Reference

James Dewitt Primus (born May 18, 1964) is an American former professional football player who was a running back for the Atlanta Falcons of the National Football League (NFL). He played college football for the UCLA Bruins. The Falcons selected him in the ninth round of the 1988 NFL draft with the 222nd overall pick.
