= Stan Clayton =

American football player (born 1965)

Benedict Tigers
- Title: Offensive coordinator & offensive line coach

Personal information
- Born: January 31, 1965 (age 61); Camden, New Jersey, U.S.
- Listed height: 6 ft 4 in (1.93 m)
- Listed weight: 265 lb (120 kg)

Career information
- High school: Cherry Hill (NJ) East
- College: Penn State
- NFL draft: 1988: 10th round, 250th overall pick

Career history

Playing
- Atlanta Falcons (1988–1989); New England Patriots (1990–1991); Pittsburgh Steelers (1992)*
- * Offseason or practice squad member only

Coaching
- Penn State (1995) Graduate assistant; UMass (1996–1997) Offensive line coach; Alabama State (1998–1999) Offensive line coach; Princeton (2000–2005) Offensive line coach; Toledo (2006–2008) Offensive line coach; Lafayette (2009–2016) Offensive line coach; Morgan State (2017) Offensive line coach; Stetson (2018–2020) Offensive coordinator & offensive line coach; Pine Ridge HS (FL) (2021) Head coach; Morgan State (2022) Offensive coordinator & offensive line coach; Morehouse (2023) Offensive coordinator & offensive line coach; Benedict (2024–present) Offensive coordinator & offensive line coach

Awards and highlights
- National champion (1986)

Career NFL statistics
- Games played: 26
- Games started: 14
- Fumble recoveries: 1
- Stats at Pro Football Reference

Stanley David Clayton (born January 31, 1965) is an American college football coach and former guard and tackle. He is the offensive coordinator & offensive line coach for Benedict College, positions he has held since 2024.

== Professional career ==
He is the offensive coordinator and offensive line coach for Benedict College, positions he has held since 2024. He played for the Atlanta Falcons from 1988 to 1989 and for the New England Patriots in 1990 and 1991. He was selected by the Falcons in the tenth round of the 1988 NFL draft with the 250th overall pick.
