= Marcus Cotton =

American football player (born 1966)

No. 51, 58, 50
- Position: Linebacker

Personal information
- Born: August 11, 1966 (age 60); Los Angeles, California, U.S.
- Listed height: 6 ft 3 in (1.91 m)
- Listed weight: 225 lb (102 kg)

Career information
- High school: Castlemont (Oakland, California)
- College: USC
- NFL draft: 1988: 2nd round, 28th overall pick

Career history
- Atlanta Falcons (1988–1990); Cleveland Browns (1990); Seattle Seahawks (1991–1992); Hamilton Tiger-Cats (1994–1995)

Awards and highlights
- First-team All-American (1987); Second-team All-American (1986); First-team All-Pac-10 (1986); Second-team All-Pac-10 (1987)

Career NFL statistics
- Sacks: 14
- Stats at Pro Football Reference

Marcus Glenn Cotton (born August 11, 1966) is an American former professional football player who was a linebacker in the National Football League (NFL) and Canadian Football League (CFL).

Cotton was born in Los Angeles, California and prepped at Castlemont High School in Oakland. He played college football, and was All-Pac-10 (1986 and 1987), at the University of Southern California. As a junior he was honored by the Associated Press as a second-team All-American, and as a senior he was chosen for the first-team by the NEA/World Almanac.

Cotton was selected by the Atlanta Falcons in the second round of the 1988 NFL draft with the 28th overall pick. He spent four years in the NFL, splitting time between the Falcons, Cleveland Browns, and Seattle Seahawks. He recorded a career high nine sacks in 1989.

Cotton finished his career with the Hamilton Tiger-Cats of the CFL, where he logged four sacks in eleven games played over the 1994 and 1995 seasons.
