= Paul Singer (American football) =

American football player (born 1966)

No. 9, 11, 15
- Position: Quarterback

Personal information
- Born: March 18, 1966 (age 60); Butler, Pennsylvania, U.S.
- Listed height: 6 ft 3 in (1.91 m)
- Listed weight: 193 lb (88 kg)

Career information
- High school: Fort Knox
- College: Western Illinois
- NFL draft: 1989: 8th round, 202nd overall pick

Career history
- Atlanta Falcons (1989); Tampa Bay Buccaneers (1989); Atlanta Falcons (1990); Birmingham Fire (1992); Tampa Bay Storm (1993); Orlando Predators (1993)

Paul Singer (born March 18, 1966) is an American former professional football quarterback who played college football at Western Illinois University. While at Western Illinois Singer was the Gateway Conference Player of the Year and the AFCA National Player of the Year runner-up. In 1988 Singer led Western Illinois to its first ever 10 win season, the Gateway Conference Championship and a number 2 national ranking. When Singers' college career ended he was the 7th all-time passing yardage leader in the history of D1 (including both 1A and 1AA) college football. He was the First Team quarterback of the Walter Camp All-American team in 1988, and also First Team AP All-American. Paul was also a GTE and NCAA Academic All-American, and the recipient of the prestigious NCAA Post-Graduate Scholarship. The Gateway Conference named Singer as quarterback of their All-Decade Team, and he also was selected as a quarterback on the national Division 1-AA (now called FCS) All-Decade Team. At Fort Knox High School Singer led his team to a perfect 15–0 season, and was named All-State and Adidas All-American. He also starred in basketball and baseball in high school. "The Slinger" was drafted in the 1989 NFL draft and played for the Atlanta Falcons and the Tampa Bay Buccaneers. In 1991 he was drafted in the second round of the World League of American Football draft and played for the San Antonio Riders and the Birmingham Fire. He also played in the Arena Football League with the Tampa Bay Storm and Orlando Predators.
