= Mike Gann =

American football player (born 1963)

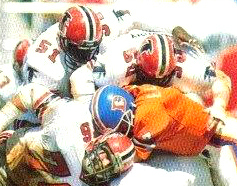
- Gann (76) tackling an opponent in 1987

No. 76
- Position: Defensive end

Personal information
- Born: October 19, 1963 (age 63); Stillwater, Oklahoma, U.S.
- Listed height: 6 ft 5 in (1.96 m)
- Listed weight: 271 lb (123 kg)

Career information
- High school: Lakewood (Colorado)
- College: Notre Dame
- NFL draft: 1985: 2nd round, 45th overall pick

Career history
- Atlanta Falcons (1985–1993)

Awards and highlights
- Second-team All-American (1984)

Career NFL statistics
- Sacks: 23.5
- Fumble recoveries: 11
- Touchdowns: 2
- Stats at Pro Football Reference

Michael Alan Gann (born October 19, 1963) is an American former professional football player who was a defensive lineman for nine seasons with the Atlanta Falcons of the National Football League (NFL).

Gann was born in Stillwater, Oklahoma and played scholastically at Lakewood High School in Colorado. He played college football for the Notre Dame Fighting Irish, where, as a senior, he was honored by United Press International as a second-team All-American.

Gann was selected by the Falcons in the second round of the 1985 NFL draft, and spent his entire career with them. He started 117 of the 118 games in which he played, recording 23.5 sacks, 1 interception, and 11 fumble recoveries. He scored a touchdown as a rookie on a lateral from teammate Rick Bryan in a win over New Orleans.
