= Scott Case (American football) =

American football player (born 1962)

No. 25
- Position: Safety

Personal information
- Born: May 17, 1962 (age 64); Waynoka, Oklahoma, U.S.
- Listed height: 6 ft 1 in (1.85 m)
- Listed weight: 188 lb (85 kg)

Career information
- High school: Edmond (Edmond, Oklahoma)
- College: Oklahoma
- NFL draft: 1984: 2nd round, 32nd overall pick

Career history
- Atlanta Falcons (1984–1994); Dallas Cowboys (1995)

Awards and highlights
- Super Bowl champion (XXX); Pro Bowl (1988); NFL interceptions leader (1988); First-team All-Big Eight (1983)

Career NFL statistics
- Games played: 178
- Interceptions: 30
- Sacks: 7.5
- Touchdowns: 1
- Stats at Pro Football Reference

Jeffrey Scott Case (born May 17, 1962) is an American former professional football player who was a safety in the National Football League (NFL) for the Atlanta Falcons and Dallas Cowboys. He played college football for the Oklahoma Sooners. He was a member of Dallas' Super Bowl XXX champion team that beat the Pittsburgh Steelers.

== Early life ==
Case attended Alva High School, before transferring to Edmond High School after his sophomore season. As a junior, he was a safety and helped his team reach the Class 4A state finals. As a senior, he was moved to running back and although he received All-State honors, his team finished with a losing record (4–7).

He was planning to enroll at Oklahoma State University, until the school took his scholarship offer back and gave it to another prospect.

== College career ==
Case enrolled at Northeastern Oklahoma A&M College. Playing free safety as a freshman, while posting 5 interceptions and contributing to an unbeaten season and a national junior college championship.

As a sophomore, he appeared in 9 games, registering 60 tackles, 4 interceptions, 12 passes defensed and received NJCAA All-All-American honors. He also returned punts (19.5-yards average) and kickoffs (15-yards average). He scored 3 touchdowns (2 on punt returns). In his two years, the school posted a 19–1 record.

Case transferred to the University of Oklahoma after his sophomore season. He was named the starting cornerback, registering 56 tackles, 2 interceptions and 8 passes defensed. As a senior, he was switched to free safety and tied a school single-season record for interceptions (eight).

In 2011, he was inducted into the Northeastern Oklahoma A&M College Athletics Hall of Fame.

== Professional career ==
=== Atlanta Falcons ===
Case was selected by the Atlanta Falcons in the second round (32nd overall) of the 1984 NFL draft. He was also selected by the Oklahoma Outlaws in the 1984 USFL Territorial Draft. He was a backup safety as a rookie.

He became a starter at strong safety in his second year, quickly establishing himself as a hard hitter, while registering 95 tackles and 4 interceptions. In 1986, he was moved to right cornerback to help him play under control and avoid mistakes, finishing with 4 interceptions and 34 passes defensed. The next year, he struggled with shoulder, neck and ankle injuries, starting 10 games, registering one interception and 36 passes defensed (led the team).

In 1988, he was selected to play in the Pro Bowl, after recording 65 tackles and leading the league with 10 interceptions, also a franchise record. The next year although he played in 14 games, he suffered stretched ligaments in his right foot and a sprained left knee that limited him to 8 starts, but still had 2 interceptions and 11 passes defensed (fourth on the team).

In 1990, with the arrival of new head coach Jerry Glanville, he was moved to free safety, registering 170 tackles (third on the team), 3 interceptions, 7 passes defensed, 3 quarterback sacks, 5 quarterback pressures and 2 fumble recoveries. The next year, he posted 162 tackles (second on the team), 2 interceptions, 9 passes defensed and 2 fumble recoveries, while helping the team make the playoffs from the first time since 1982.

In 1994, he played mostly as a backup on the nickel defense (3 starts).

During his eleven year career with the Falcons, he only experienced one winning season (1991), that year the team won its first playoff game since 1978. He finished second in career tackles, fourth in career interceptions (30), led defensive backs in career sacks (7.5) and with the third-most games played by a defender in franchise history.

=== Dallas Cowboys ===
On August 24, 1995, he signed as a free agent with the Dallas Cowboys, reuniting him with his college coach Barry Switzer. He was used as the strong safety in the nickel defense and also played on special teams. He collected 32 defensive tackles, 4 passes defensed and 13 special teams tackles (tied for sixth on the team). He was a part of the Super Bowl XXX winning team and had a highlight-reel tackle, that forced an Ernie Mills fumble that was recovered by the Pittsburgh Steelers. He wasn't re-signed after the season.

== Personal life ==
Case now lives in Buford, Georgia with his wife, Connie, and their four children. He is a business partner with former Falcons teammate Tom Pridemore at Pride Utility Construction Company. His daughter, Kallie Case, played softball at the University of Alabama. He has two sons, Kyler and Kody, and another daughter, Kelsey.
