= Houston Hoover =

American football player (born 1965)

No. 69, 64
- Positions: Guard, tackle

Personal information
- Born: February 6, 1965 (age 61); Yazoo City, Mississippi, U.S.
- Listed height: 6 ft 2 in (1.88 m)
- Listed weight: 295 lb (134 kg)

Career information
- High school: Yazoo City
- College: Jackson State
- NFL draft: 1988: 6th round, 140th overall pick

Career history
- Atlanta Falcons (1988–1992); Cleveland Browns (1993); Miami Dolphins (1994)

Career NFL statistics
- Games played: 98
- Games started: 88
- Fumble recoveries: 7
- Stats at Pro Football Reference

Houston Roosevelt Hoover (born February 6, 1965) is an American former professional football player who was an offensive lineman in the National Football League (NFL) for the Atlanta Falcons, Cleveland Browns and Miami Dolphins. He played college football for the Jackson State Tigers. He was selected by the Falcons in the sixth round of the 1988 NFL draft with the 140th overall pick.
