= Michael Reid (linebacker) =

American football player (born 1964)

No. 95
- Position: Linebacker

Personal information
- Born: June 25, 1964 (age 62); Albany, Georgia, U.S.
- Listed height: 6 ft 2 in (1.88 m)
- Listed weight: 226 lb (103 kg)

Career information
- High school: Dougherty (Albany)
- College: Wisconsin
- NFL draft: 1987: 7th round, 181st overall pick

Career history
- Atlanta Falcons (1987–1992)

Awards and highlights
- First-team All-Big Ten (1986)

Career NFL statistics
- Fumble recoveries: 1
- Sacks: 4
- Stats at Pro Football Reference

Michael Edward Reid (born June 25, 1964) is an American former professional football player who was a linebacker in the National Football League (NFL). He played college football for the Wisconsin Badgers.

== Football career ==
Reid attended the University of Wisconsin–Madison. He remains the Badgers' single-season record holder for solo tackles with 101 (1986) and is still tied for the most fumbles recovered in a game - 3 vs Ohio state. He lettered 4 years, was the team's MVP in 1986. During his career he was elected to both the Big Ten's Football team and its All Academic Football Team.

Reid was selected in the 7th round (181st overall) by the Atlanta Falcons in the 1987 NFL draft. His entire six seasons in the NFL were with the Atlanta Falcons from 1987 to 1992.

In April 2000, he was inducted into the Albany Sports Hall of Fame.

== Personal life ==
Michael Reid, a computer science graduate of the University of Wisconsin (1987) worked several internships with IBM in Boca Raton Florida, Madison, Wisconsin and Atlanta, Georgia. He began the study of martial arts after his Rookie season with the Atlanta Falcons in January 1988. At the completion of his NFL career he chose to continue being an athlete and a teacher by opening a martial arts school initially named the Chinese Shaolin Center for the Martial Arts in 1993. A private student of Elder Master Gary Grooms, Reid earned his 6th Degree Rank Master Title in Shaolin Martial Arts in 2010. His school has since been renamed Reid's Premier Martial Arts and Michael Reid serves as its Founder, Head Master and leading proponent for growth. The school teaches Shaolin Kung Fu, Tai Chi, Krav Maga and Kuntao/Silat to adults and specializes in the Personal Development of Kids ages 5–12. Mr. Reid also founded MasterReid.com where he works with youth, life coaches and speaks to groups in conjunction with his martial arts responsibilities.

In February 2014 Master Reid was blessed to visit Hawaii and train with traditional Hawaiian Lua Masters. In August 2015 Master Reid was recognized for his many years of service, as he was inducted into the Masters Martial Arts Hall of Fame.

In May–June 2015, he traveled to Indonesia for extensive training in Kuntao/Siat/ KungFu visiting and training in Bandung, Indonesia, Yogyakarta, Indonesia and Bali Indonesia and in September 2015 he was interviewed by Temple Underground Radio.
