= George Thomas (wide receiver) =

American football player (born 1964)

No. 89, 87
- Position: Wide receiver

Personal information
- Born: July 11, 1964 (age 62); Riverside, California, U.S.
- Listed height: 5 ft 9 in (1.75 m)
- Listed weight: 169 lb (77 kg)

Career information
- High school: Indio (Indio, California)
- College: UNLV
- NFL draft: 1988: 6th round, 138th overall pick

Career history
- Atlanta Falcons (1988–1992); Tampa Bay Buccaneers (1992)

Career NFL statistics
- Games played: 51
- Receptions: 56
- Receiving yards: 848
- Receiving TDs: 3
- Stats at Pro Football Reference

George Ray Thomas Jr. (born July 11, 1964) is an American former professional football player who was a wide receiver in the National Football League (NFL) for the Atlanta Falcons and Tampa Bay Buccaneers. He played college football for the UNLV Rebels. He was selected by the Falcons in the sixth round of the 1988 NFL draft.
