= Charles Dimry =

American football player (born 1966)

No. 22, 29, 39, 38, 27
- Position: Cornerback

Personal information
- Born: January 31, 1966 (age 60); San Diego, California, U.S.
- Listed height: 6 ft 0 in (1.83 m)
- Listed weight: 176 lb (80 kg)

Career information
- High school: Oceanside (Oceanside, California)
- College: UNLV
- NFL draft: 1988: 5th round, 110th overall pick

Career history
- Atlanta Falcons (1988–1990); Denver Broncos (1991–1993); Tampa Bay Buccaneers (1994–1996); Philadelphia Eagles (1997); San Diego Chargers (1998–1999)

Career NFL statistics
- Tackles: 580
- Interceptions: 21
- Fumble recoveries: 7
- Stats at Pro Football Reference

Charles Louis Dimry III (born January 31, 1966) is an American former professional football player who was a cornerback in the National Football League (NFL) for the Atlanta Falcons, Denver Broncos, Tampa Bay Buccaneers, Philadelphia Eagles, and San Diego Chargers. After graduating from Oceanside High School he continued on to play college football for the UNLV Rebels. He was selected by the Falcons in the fifth round of the 1988 NFL draft (110th overall pick). He played 12 years in the NFL. He was twice awarded the NFL's Ed Block Courage Award and was twice named the Chargers' Most Inspirational Player.

Dimry resides in Carlsbad, California, with his wife, Erin, and their six children: Erin, CArlee, CJ, Sophie, Soleil, and Gia. After retiring from the NFL, he coached at USD with Jim Harbaugh. He is a previous owner of the Velocity Sports Performance training facilities in San Diego. He also is a correspondent for San Diego's prep football show Prep Pigskin Report with his own segment.
