= Atlanta Falcons all-time roster =

1,403 players have appeared in at least one regular season or postseason game in the National Football League (NFL) for the Atlanta Falcons since 1966. This list is accurate through the end of the 2025 NFL season.

== A ==
- Micah Abernathy
- John Abraham
- Delrick Abrams
- Dick Absher
- Ron Acks
- Bob Adams
- Brent Adams
- Phillip Adams
- Scott Adams
- Spencer Adkins
- Mel Agee
- Jamal Agnew
- Keith Alex
- Harold Alexander
- P. J. Alexander
- Dee Alford
- Robert Alford
- Josh Ali
- Anthony Allen
- Grady Allen
- Ricardo Allen
- Ryan Allen
- Tyler Allgeier
- Ashley Ambrose
- Morten Andersen
- Troy Andersen
- Abdullah Anderson
- Anthony Anderson
- Courtney Anderson
- Darren Anderson
- Dunstan Anderson
- Jamaal Anderson
- Jamal Anderson
- Taz Anderson
- Tim Anderson
- Josh Andrews
- William Andrews
- Eli Ankou
- Lester Archambeau
- David Archer
- Javier Arenas
- Cornell Armstrong
- Jon Asamoah
- Corey Atkins
- Joe Auer
- Cliff Austin

== B ==
- Jonathan Babineaux
- Rick Badanjek
- Allen Bailey
- Jim Bailey
- Larry Bailey
- Stacey Bailey
- Eugene Baker
- Sam Baker
- Sean Baker
- Tony Baker
- Chris Banks
- Kenjon Barner
- Gary Barnes
- Lew Barnes
- Doug Barnett
- Oliver Barnett
- Milton Barney
- Steve Bartkowski
- Rich Bartlewski
- Joplo Bartu
- Daren Bates
- Jessie Bates
- Patrick Bates
- D'Anthony Batiste
- Chris Bayne
- Zane Beadles
- Bubba Bean
- Aaron Beasley
- Vic Beasley
- Nick Bebout
- Jordan Beck
- Brad Beckman
- Bill Bell
- Quinton Bell
- Travis Bell
- Willie Belton
- Dan Benish
- Cornelius Bennett
- Michael Bennett
- Cliff Benson
- Duane Benson
- Thomas Benson
- Scott Bentley
- Matthew Bergeron
- Eric Bergeson
- Jared Bernhardt
- Bob Berry
- Louis Berry
- JD Bertrand
- Justin Bethel
- Eric Beverly
- Martin Bibla
- Kroy Biermann
- Dwight Bingham
- Guy Bingham
- J. J. Birden
- Greg Bishop
- Chris Blair
- Christian Blake
- Dwayne Blakley
- Justin Blalock
- Tom Bleick
- Juran Bolden
- Michael Boley
- Marty Booker
- Michael Booker
- Chris Bordano
- Matt Bosher
- Bruce Bosley
- Ken Bowen
- Tony Bowick
- Andy Bowling
- Billy Bowman Jr.
- Sean Boyd
- Allen Bradford
- Ronnie Bradford
- John Bramlett
- David Brandon
- Bob Breitenstein
- Sean Brewer
- Greg Brezina
- James Britt
- Eric Brock
- Keith Brooking
- Ethan Brooks
- Jon Brooks
- Natrone Brooks
- Tony Brooks-James
- Steve Broussard
- Aaron Brown
- Charlie Brown
- Clay Brown
- Greg Brown
- Jamon Brown
- Omar Brown
- Ray Brown
- Reggie Brown
- Tyrone Brown
- Aundray Bruce
- Rob Bruggeman
- Mike Brunson
- Rick Bryan
- Charlie Bryant
- Cobee Bryant
- Matt Bryant
- Romby Bryant
- Warren Bryant
- Ray Buchanan
- Jonathan Bullard
- Vern Burke
- Gary Burley
- John Burrough
- Ken Burrow
- Jimmy Burson
- Deante Burton
- Devin Bush Sr.
- Bobby Butler
- Jim Butler
- Jerry Butler
- Rick Byas
- Damiere Byrd
- Sylvester Byrd

== C ==
- Brian Cabral
- Dave Cahill
- Lynn Cain
- Lee Calland
- Chris Calloway
- Reggie Camp
- Calais Campbell
- De'Vondre Campbell
- Scott Campbell
- Sonny Campbell
- Gabe Carimi
- James Carpenter
- Keion Carpenter
- Paul Carrington
- Bruce Carter
- Jamal Carter
- Lorenzo Carter
- Marty Carter
- Nate Carter
- Johndale Carty
- Scott Case
- Antoine Cash
- Chris Cash
- Rick Cash
- Tony Casillas
- Wendell Cason
- Grady Cavness
- Joe Cerne
- Pat Chaffey
- Kirk Chambers
- Chris Chandler
- Jamar Chaney
- Mike Chapman
- Wes Chesson
- Chris Chester
- Darrin Chiaverini
- Henry Childs
- Bob Christian
- Tyson Clabo
- Dennis Claridge
- Travis Claridge
- Bret Clark
- Randy Clark
- Vinnie Clark
- Ben Claxton
- Adrian Clayborn
- Stan Clayton
- DeAndra' Cobb
- Junior Coffey
- Chase Coffman
- Gail Cogdill
- Angelo Coia
- Derrick Coleman
- Erik Coleman
- Rod Coleman
- Tevin Coleman
- Calvin Collins
- Jalen Collins
- Shawn Collins
- Sonny Collins
- Dustin Colquitt
- John Cominsky
- Tom Compton
- Jon Condo
- Glen Condren
- Kevin Cone
- Darion Conner
- Ed Cook
- Evan Cooper
- Jim Cope
- Brandon Copeland
- Olie Cordill
- Chuck Correal
- Joe Costello
- Marcus Cotton
- Ted Cottrell
- Terry Cousin
- Kirk Cousins
- Arthur Cox
- Mike Cox
- Jack Crawford
- Chris Crocker
- Henri Crockett
- David Croudip
- Larry Crowe
- Dane Cruikshank
- Alge Crumpler
- William Curran
- Buddy Curry
- Johnathan Cyprien

== D ==
- Carlton Dabney
- Harvey Dahl
- Drew Dalman
- Jalen Dalton
- Brad Daluiso
- Woodrow Dantzler
- Frank Darby
- Marlon Davidson
- Antone Davis
- Brad Davis
- Carey Davis
- Chauncey Davis
- Dominique Davis
- Drew Davis
- Greg Davis
- Mike Davis
- Nathan Davis
- Paul Davis
- Ron Davis
- Scott Davis
- Tae Davis
- Tyeler Davison
- Tony Daykin
- Divine Deablo
- Steve DeBerg
- Thomas DeCoud
- Darqueze Dennard
- Akeem Dent
- Eric Dickerson
- Matt Dickerson
- Steve Dils
- Patrick DiMarco
- Charles Dimry
- Howard Dinkins
- Floyd Dixon
- Rich Dixon
- Al Dodd
- Chris Doleman
- Jeff Donaldson
- Rick Donnelly
- Mike Donohoe
- Brandon Dorlus
- Harry Douglas
- Gary Downs
- Chris Draft
- Shane Dronett
- Dylan Drummond
- T. J. Duckett
- Kevin Dudley
- Dan Dufour
- Steve Duich
- Jamie Dukes
- Dave Dunaway
- LaTarence Dunbar
- Jamie Duncan
- Perry Lee Dunn
- Warrick Dunn
- Bud Dupree
- Justin Durant
- Ross Dwelley
- Tim Dwight

== E ==
- Ron East
- Ray Easterling
- Irv Eatman
- Tracey Eaton
- Rick Eber
- Arnold Ebiketie
- Chuma Edoga
- Antonio Edwards
- Antuan Edwards
- Austin Edwards
- Brad Edwards
- Bryan Edwards
- Herm Edwards
- Ray Edwards
- Terrence Edwards
- Milo Eifler
- Jason Elam
- Monroe Eley
- Emmanuel Ellerbee
- Jamin Elliott
- Clarence Ellis
- Kaden Elliss
- Bert Emanuel
- Larry Emery
- Dick Enderle
- Tory Epps
- Mike Esposito
- Dorian Etheridge
- Bob Etter
- John Evans
- Rashaan Evans
- Major Everett
- William Evers
- Bradie Ewing

== F ==
- Eric Fairs
- Karl Farmer
- Jimmy Farris
- Wilson Faumuina
- Brett Favre
- Jay Feely
- Rashad Fenton
- James Ferguson
- Edgar Fields
- Scott Fields
- Brian Finneran
- Anthony Firkser
- Joe Fishback
- Tucker Fisk
- Mickey Fitzgerald
- Mike Fitzgerald
- John FitzPatrick
- Paul Flatley
- Ronald Flemons
- Kenny Flowers
- Tre Flowers
- Leonard Floyd
- Darryl Ford
- Mike Ford
- Kynan Forney
- Roman Fortin
- Renardo Foster
- Jamal Fountaine
- Dante Fowler
- Domonique Foxworth
- Bill Fralic
- Wallace Francis
- George Franklin
- Dominique Franks
- Feleipe Franks
- Simon Fraser
- Devonta Freeman
- Mike Freeman
- Dwight Freeney
- Ted Fritsch Jr.
- Elliott Fry
- David Frye
- Jamaal Fudge
- Scott Fulhage
- Jordan Fuller
- Randy Fuller
- Brandon Fusco

== G ==
- Taylor Gabriel
- Russell Gage
- Blane Gaison
- Omar Gaither
- Frank Gallagher
- Tommy Gallarda
- Wayne Gallman
- Wayne Gandy
- Mike Gann
- Elijah Garcia
- Jim Garcia
- Derrick Gardner
- Moe Gardner
- Ben Garland
- Roberto Garza
- Trevor Gaylor
- Joe Gaziano
- Jumpy Geathers
- Jeff George
- Ron George
- Steve George
- Tom Geredine
- Jammi German
- Willie Germany
- Ralph Giacomarro
- Damon Gibson
- Lewis Gilbert
- Tony Gilbert
- John Gilliam
- Paul Gipson
- Glenn Glass
- Bob Glazebrook
- Junior Glymph
- Charles Godfrey
- Willard Goff
- Bill Goldberg
- Eddie Goldman
- Dashon Goldson
- Matt Gono
- Leon Gonzalez
- Tony Gonzalez
- Zane Gonzalez
- Malliciah Goodman
- C. J. Goodwin
- Doug Goodwin
- Darrien Gordon
- Dwayne Gordon
- Tim Gordon
- Colby Gossett
- Len Gotshalk
- Jermaine Grace
- Gino Gradkowski
- Jaeden Graham
- Shayne Graham
- Ta'Quon Graham
- Norm Granger
- Richie Grant
- Paul Gray
- Tony Graziani
- Harold Green
- Lamont Green
- Tim Green
- T. J. Green
- Tiger Greene
- Donovan Greer
- Steve Griffin
- Steve Griffin
- Justin Griffith
- Brent Grimes
- Dan Grimm
- Harland Gunn
- Todd Gurley
- Jovaughn Gwyn

== H ==
- Ra'Shede Hageman
- Ali Haji-Sheikh
- Corey Hall
- Cory Hall
- Darren Hall
- DeAngelo Hall
- James Hall
- Marvin Hall
- Travis Hall
- Tyler Hall
- Bob Hallen
- Dean Halverson
- Antonio Hamilton
- Conrad Hamilton
- Ruffin Hamilton
- Dave Hampton
- Kwante Hampton
- Leonard Hankerson
- Don Hansen
- Byron Hanspard
- Justin Hardy
- Sean Harlow
- Duron Harmon
- Tom Harmon
- John Harper
- Roger Harper
- Joey Harrington
- Antoine Harris
- Billy Harris
- Bryce Harris
- Charles Harris
- Demone Harris
- Erik Harris
- Josh Harris
- Leonard Harris
- Ronnie Harris
- Roy Harris
- Dennis Harrison
- Ronnie Harrison
- Zach Harrison
- Leo Hart
- Ben Hartsock
- Edgerton Hartwell
- Dennis Havig
- A. J. Hawk
- Alex Hawkins
- Jaylinn Hawkins
- Joe Hawley
- Steve Haworth
- Kelvin Hayden
- Mercury Hayes
- Tom Hayes
- Michael Haynes
- Verron Haynes
- Casey Hayward
- Ronnie Heard
- Rodney Heath
- Bobby Hebert
- Ralph Heck
- Taylor Heinicke
- DeMarcco Hellams
- Ron Heller
- C. J. Henderson
- Jim Hendley
- Matt Hennessy
- Chuck Herman
- Steve Herndon
- Mack Herron
- Parker Hesse
- Devin Hester
- Jessie Hester
- Dave Hettema
- Craig Heyward
- Alex Higdon
- Brian Hill
- Drew Hill
- Kahlil Hill
- Tye Hill
- Roy Hilton
- Chris Hinton
- Kyle Hinton
- Floyd Hodge
- KhaDarel Hodge
- Sterling Hofrichter
- John Holecek
- Mack Hollins
- Bob Holly
- Lamar Holmes
- Rudy Holmes
- Pierce Holt
- Austin Hooper
- Houston Hoover
- Chris Hope
- Joe Horn
- Timmy Horne
- Chris Houston
- Thomas Howard
- Glen Howe
- Pat Howell
- Floyd Hudlow
- Chris Hudson
- Charles Huff
- Albert Huggins
- Judge Hughes
- Mike Hughes
- Claude Humphrey
- John Hunter
- Scott Hunter
- Caleb Huntley
- Kevin Huntley
- Richard Huntley
- Hayden Hurst
- Tom Hutchinson

== I ==
- Germain Ifedi
- Godwin Igwebuike
- David Irons
- Bruce Irvin
- Kemal Ishmael

== J ==
- Eric Jack
- Alfred Jackson
- Chevis Jackson
- Ernie Jackson
- Grady Jackson
- Jeff Jackson
- Lamar Jackson
- Larron Jackson
- Lawrence Jackson
- Marlion Jackson
- Robert Jackson
- Steven Jackson
- T. J. Jackson
- Tyson Jackson
- Willie Jackson
- John James
- Robert James
- Brandon Jamison
- Grady Jarrett
- Ray Jarvis
- Richard Jarvis
- Ed Jasper
- Jason Jefferson
- Shawn Jefferson
- Van Jefferson
- Noel Jenke
- Alfred Jenkins
- Melvin Jenkins
- Michael Jenkins
- Adam Jennings
- Michael Jerrell
- Peria Jerry
- Travis Jervey
- Bill Jobko
- Billy "White Shoes" Johnson
- D. J. Johnson
- Darius Johnson
- Derrick Johnson
- Doug Johnson
- Ellis Johnson
- Eric Johnson
- Gartrell Johnson
- Jaleel Johnson
- Kenny Johnson
- Mike Johnson
- Norm Johnson
- Randy Johnson
- Rudy Johnson
- Terrence Johnson
- Thomas Johnson
- Tracy Johnson
- Undra Johnson
- Bob Jones
- Deion Jones
- Derrick Jones
- Earl Jones
- Henry Jones
- Jerry Jones
- Joey Jones
- Julio Jones
- June Jones
- Keith Jones
- Lyndell Jones
- Tony Jones
- Antony Jordan
- Brian Jordan
- Matthew Judon

== K ==
- Dave Kadela
- John Kamana
- Danny Kanell
- Khalid Kareem
- Rick Kay
- Damontae Kazee
- Jeff Kelly
- Reggie Kelly
- Todd Kelly
- Vince Kendrick
- Mike Kenn
- Lincoln Kennedy
- Patrick Kerney
- Josh Keyes
- Jeff Kiewel
- Todd Kinchen
- Greg Kindle
- Akeem King
- Austin King
- Jerome King
- Kevin King
- Luther Kirk
- Lou Kirouac
- Kurt Kittner
- Perry Klein
- Leander Knight
- Michael Koenen
- Richard Koeper
- Peter Konz
- Younghoe Koo
- Brian Kozlowski
- Erik Kramer
- Rich Kraynak
- Keith Krepfle
- Rudy Kuechenberg
- George Kunz
- Jake Kupp
- Fulton Kuykendall
- Nick Kwiatkoski

== L ==
- Antwan Lake
- Ron Lamb
- Nate Landman
- Mike Landrum
- Gene Lang
- Jeremy Langford
- Austin Larkin
- Jim Laughlin
- Chad Lavalais
- Al Lavan
- Kent Lawrence
- Rolland Lawrence
- George Layne
- John Leake
- Harper LeBel
- Monte Ledbetter
- Bob Lee
- Bobby Lee
- Danzell Lee
- Dwight Lee
- Ronnie Lee
- Byron Leftwich
- John Leglue
- Matt Lehr
- Ashley Lelie
- Bruce Lemmerman
- Greg Lens
- Rick Leonard
- Dave Levenick
- Andy Levitre
- Mike Lewis
- Trey Lewis
- Errol Linden
- Chris Lindstrom
- Curtis Lofton
- Ernie Logan
- Drake London
- LaCale London
- Bob Long
- Jake Long
- Billy Lothridge
- Calvin Loveall
- Omare Lowe
- Dwight Lowery
- Mick Luckhurst
- Mike Lush
- Robert Lyles
- Mitch Lyons

== M ==
- Ron Mabra
- Alex Mack
- Red Mack
- Doug Mackie
- Terrence Magee
- Jesse Mahelona
- Rydell Melancon
- Josh Mallard
- John Mallory
- Art Malone
- DeAngelo Malone
- Jim Mankins
- Rosie Manning
- Stansly Maponga
- Frank Marchlewski
- Greg Marderian
- Marcus Mariota
- Dean Marlowe
- Bud Marshall
- Randy Marshall
- Whit Marshall
- Billy Martin
- Charles Martin
- Tony Martin
- Freddie Martino
- Greg Marx
- Jonathan Massaquoi
- Kevin Mathis
- Terance Mathis
- John Matlock
- Allama Matthews
- Aubrey Matthews
- Clay Matthews Jr.
- Cliff Matthews
- Henry Matthews
- Jake Matthews
- Andy Maurer
- Curtis Maxey
- Brett Maxie
- James Mayberry
- Jalen Mayfield
- Tim Mazzetti
- Joey Mbu
- Tod McBride
- Gerald McBurrows
- Kevin McCadam
- Brendan McCarthy
- Ron McCartney
- Tom McCauley
- Dewey McClain
- Robert McClain
- Terrell McClain
- Jase McClellan
- Ray-Ray McCloud
- Todd McClure
- Quentin McCord
- Luke McCown
- Fred McCrary
- Greg McCrary
- Justin McCray
- Liam McCullough
- Pellom McDaniels
- Gary McDermott
- Tommy McDonald
- Paul McFadden
- Kaleb McGary
- Molly McGee
- Lenny McGill
- Reggie McGrew
- Joe McIntosh
- Corey McIntyre
- Secdrick McIntyre
- Takkarist McKinley
- Phil McKinnely
- Tim McKyer
- Kim McQuilken
- Steven Means
- Carson Meier
- Kerry Meier
- Terrence Melton
- Jeff Merrow
- Eric Metcalf
- Larry Mialik
- Rich Miano
- Ron Middleton
- Nick Mike-Mayer
- Russ Mikeska
- Hugh Millen
- Brett Miller
- Calvin Miller
- Chris Miller
- Jim Miller
- Jordan Miller
- Junior Miller
- Nate Miller
- Scotty Miller
- James Milling
- Lawyer Milloy
- Martrez Milner
- David Mims
- Brian Mitchell
- Charles Mitchell
- Jim Mitchell
- Ken Mitchell
- Leonard Mitchell
- Roland Mitchell
- Tony Moeaki
- Jovante Moffatt
- Chris Mohr
- Rod Monroe
- Alton Montgomery
- Marv Montgomery
- Darnell Mooney
- Buddy Moor
- Ken Moore
- Michael Moore
- Robert Moore
- Ron Moore
- Tom Moore
- William Moore
- Kindal Moorehead
- Fabian Moreau
- Dwayne Morgan
- Tom Moriarty
- Mike Moroski
- Dwaine Morris
- Larry Morris
- Thomas Morstead
- Christian Morton
- Gary Moss
- Zeke Motta
- Mark Mraz
- Ovie Mughelli
- Neal Musser

== N ==
- Browning Nagle
- Keanu Neal
- Louis Neal
- Ryan Neal
- Sharrod Neasman
- Dallas Neil
- Corey Nelson
- Jack Nelson
- Ryan Neuzil
- Keith Newman
- Cam Newton
- Stephen Nicholas
- Cameron Nizialek
- Tommy Nobis
- Terry Nofsinger
- Jerome Norris
- Jim Norton
- Storm Norton
- Jerious Norwood
- Ralph Norwood

== O ==
- Nate Odomes
- Ray Ogden
- Ade Ogundeji
- Quinn Ojinnaka
- Jeff Okudah
- Deji Olatoye
- Darryl Oliver
- Isaiah Oliver
- Winslow Oliver
- Qadree Ollison
- Foyesade Oluokun
- Frank Omiyale
- David Onyemata
- Ruke Orhorhoro
- Ralph Ortega
- Ricky Ortiz
- Paul Oswald
- Jeff Overbaugh
- Will Overstreet
- Chris Owens
- Dan Owens
- Ken Oxendine

== P ==
- Jeff Pahukoa
- Dick Palmer
- Michael Palmer
- Bear Pascoe
- Austin Pasztor
- Greg Paterra
- Jerome Pathon
- Cordarrelle Patterson
- Riley Patterson
- Ricky Patton
- Jeff Paulk
- Logan Paulsen
- James Pearce Jr.
- Dennis Pearson
- Jared Peck
- Justin Peelle
- Erric Pegram
- Joe Pellegrini
- Michael Penix
- Mike Pennel
- Terrance Pennington
- Robert Pennywell
- Charlie Peprah
- Joshua Perkins
- Mike Perko
- Mike Person
- Wally Pesuit
- Corey Peters
- Mike Peterson
- Todd Peterson
- Anthony Phillips
- Clark Phillips III
- Jason Phillips
- Ray Phillips
- Mareno Philyaw
- Bruce Pickens
- Evan Pilgrim
- Lawrence Pillers
- Bradley Pinion
- Cleveland Pinkney
- Artose Pinner
- Scott Piper
- Bryan Pittman
- Kyle Pitts
- Mike Pitts
- Anthony Pleasant
- Reggie Pleasant
- Tony Plummer
- Ray Poage
- Dontari Poe
- Lousaka Polite
- Marcus Pollard
- Tyler Polumbus
- Brian Poole
- Shelley Poole
- Jose Portilla
- Brandon Powell
- Carlton Powell
- Matt Prater
- Roell Preston
- Art Price
- Peerless Price
- Tom Pridemore
- James Primus
- Isaiah Prince
- Mike Prindle
- Mike Pritchard
- Billy Pritchett
- Stanley Pritchett
- Wes Pritchett
- Joe Profit
- Andrew Provence
- Etric Pruitt
- MyCole Pruitt

== Q ==
- Greg Quick
- Teagan Quitoriano

== R ==
- Derek Rackley
- John Rade
- Jason Rader
- Wayne Radloff
- Nick Rassas
- Eddie Ray
- Terry Ray
- Ken Reaves
- Ron Rector
- Reggie Redding
- Kasey Redfern
- Chris Redman
- Anthony Redmon
- Rudy Redmond
- Brooks Reed
- Frank Reed
- Oscar Reed
- Guy Reese
- Ike Reese
- Michael Reid
- Sean Renfree
- Garrett Reynolds
- LaRoy Reynolds
- Bobby Richards
- David Richards
- Jordan Richards
- Al Richardson
- Jerry Richardson
- Desmond Ridder
- Louis Riddick
- Preston Ridlehuber
- Calvin Ridley
- Stevan Ridley
- Bob Riggle
- Gerald Riggs
- Duke Riley
- Karon Riley
- Andre Rison
- Jim Ritcher
- Constantin Ritzmann
- Ron Rivers
- Andre Roberts
- Gary Roberts
- George Roberts
- Guy Roberts
- Sam Roberts
- Jamal Robertson
- Travian Robertson
- Aldrick Robinson
- Bijan Robinson
- Bo Robinson
- Don Robinson
- Dunta Robinson
- Edmond Robinson
- Eugene Robinson
- Jammie Robinson
- Laurent Robinson
- Terrence Robinson
- Travaris Robinson
- Brian Robiskie
- Tommy Robison
- Courtney Roby
- Jacquizz Rodgers
- Doug Rogers
- Sam Rogers
- Brett Romberg
- John Parker Romo
- Josh Rosen
- Derek Ross
- Kevin Ross
- Allen Rossum
- Chris Rowland
- Ricky Royal
- Mike Rozier
- Ahtyba Rubin
- Karl Rubke
- Mike Ruether
- Anthony Rush
- Marion Rushing
- Carl Russ
- Twan Russell
- Matt Ryan
- Billy Ryckman
- Paul Ryczek

== S ==
- Bill Sabatino
- Troy Sadowski
- Pat Saindon
- Ephraim Salaam
- Ty Sambrailo
- Asante Samuel
- Bill Sandeman
- Bob Sanders
- Darnell Sanders
- Deion Sanders
- Eric Sanders
- James Sanders
- Lewis Sanders
- Ricky Sanders
- O. J. Santiago
- Mohamed Sanu
- Eric Saubert
- Craig Sauer
- Josh Savage
- Brian Saxton
- Charley Scales
- Matt Schaub
- Shann Schillinger
- Roy Schmidt
- Mike Schneck
- O'Brien Schofield
- Turk Schonert
- Ryan Schraeder
- Adam Schreiber
- Lance Schulters
- Wes Schweitzer
- Bryan Scott
- Dave Scott
- Freddie Scott
- Jonathan Scott
- John Scully
- Virgil Seay
- Deadrin Senat
- John Settle
- Siddeeq Shabazz
- Kevin Shaffer
- Dan Sharp
- Tajae Sharpe
- Jerry Shay
- Larry Shears
- Kendall Sheffield
- Derrick Shelby
- Elbert Shelley
- Chris Shelling
- Prince Shembo
- Bob Sherlag
- James Shibest
- Dick Shiner
- Wes Shivers
- Darrell Shropshire
- Mickey Shuler Jr.
- Lawrence Sidbury
- Jimmy Sidle
- Chuck Sieminski
- David Sills
- Carl Silvestri
- Jerry Simmons
- Justin Simmons
- Jim Simon
- Mark Simoneau
- Joe Sims
- Steve Sloan
- Gerald Small
- John Small
- Dave Smigelsky
- Andre Smith
- Antone Smith
- Brady Smith
- Chuck Smith
- Don Smith
- Ed Smith
- Ito Smith
- Jerome Smith
- Jonnu Smith
- Keith Smith
- Lee Smith
- Maurice Smith
- Mike Smith
- Ralph Smith
- Reggie Smith
- Ron Smith
- Royce Smith
- Struggy Smith
- Tony Smith
- Vinson Smith
- James Smith-Williams
- Jason Snelling
- Malcolm Snider
- Todd Snyder
- Phil Sobocinski
- Paul Soliai
- Jesse Solomon
- Dezmen Southward
- Darryl Spencer
- Herb Spencer
- Phil Spiller
- Andy Spiva
- Mike Spivey
- Jason Spriggs
- Sylvester Stamps
- Haskel Stanback
- Jeff Stanciel
- Montavious Stanley
- John Starnes
- Tyler Starr
- Aaron Stecker
- Fred Steinfort
- Alex Stepanovich
- Matt Stewart
- Steve Stewart
- Jim Stienke
- Bryan Still
- Luke Stocker
- Barry Stokes
- Daren Stone
- James Stone
- Art Strahan
- Kentavius Street
- Ray Strong
- Dan Stryzinski
- Mark Studaway
- Nate Stupar
- Boone Stutz
- Lorenzo Styles
- Larry Suchy
- Jim Sullivan
- Pat Sullivan
- Eddie Sutter
- Will Svitek
- Shawn Swayda
- Stan Sytsma
- Joe Szczecko

== T ==
- Don Talbert
- Ben Talley
- Darryl Talley
- Jacob Tamme
- Keith Tandy
- Rodney Tate
- Pita Taumoepenu
- Giorgio Tavecchio
- Henry Taylor
- Jamar Taylor
- Johnny Taylor
- Keith Taylor
- Lenny Taylor
- Malcolm Taylor
- Terry Taylor
- Tony Taylor
- Matthew Teague
- Garth TenNapel
- A. J. Terrell
- Galand Thaxton
- Robenson Therezie
- Keith Thibodeaux
- R. C. Thielemann
- John Thierry
- Ahmad Thomas
- Ben Thomas
- Chuck Thomas
- George Thomas
- Rodney Thomas
- Sean Thomas
- Leon Thomasson
- Deven Thompkins
- Michael Thompson
- Woody Thompson
- Nick Thurman
- D. J. Tialavea
- Mike Tilleman
- Gerald Tinker
- Ken Tippins
- Robbie Tobeck
- Levine Toilolo
- Tommy Tolleson
- Billy Joe Tolliver
- Leigh Torrence
- Austin Trammell
- Wade Traynham
- Laquon Treadwell
- Ahmad Treaudo
- Jordan Tripp
- Jeremy Trueblood
- Desmond Trufant
- Esera Tuaolo
- Jessie Tuggle
- Jacob Tuioti-Mariner
- Tani Tupou
- Nick Turnbull
- Jimmy Turner
- Michael Turner
- Tom Tutson
- Perry Tuttle
- Scott Tyner
- Tim Tyrrell

== U ==
- Artie Ulmer
- Osi Umenyiora
- Courtney Upshaw

== V ==
- Jeff Van Note
- Jeff Van Raaphorst
- Josh Vaughan
- Darrick Vaughn
- Khaleed Vaughn
- James Vaughters
- Demetrin Veal
- Joe Vellano
- Clarence Verdin
- Michael Vick
- Ken Vinyard
- Tyler Vrabel

== W ==
- Harmon Wages
- Dan Wagoner
- Chuck Walker
- Cleo Walker
- Darnell Walker
- Jalon Walker
- Mykal Walker
- Vance Walker
- Darrin Walls
- Terron Ward
- Lonnie Warwick
- Carlos Washington
- Casey Washington
- Charles Washington
- Joe Washington
- Joe Washington
- John Washington
- Ronnie Washington
- Jim Waskiewicz
- Xavier Watts
- Fred Weary
- Jim Weatherford
- Jim Weatherly
- Sean Weatherspoon
- Emanuel Weaver
- Jason Webster
- Eric Weems
- Todd Weiner
- Ed West
- John Wetzel
- Philip Wheeler
- Ernie Wheelwright
- Ken Whisenhunt
- Chris White
- Dez White
- D. J. White
- Lyman White
- Roddy White
- William White
- Bob Whitfield
- Bob Whitlow
- Dave Widell
- Eric Wiegand
- Matt Wile
- Chuck Wiley
- Ben Wilkerson
- Reggie Wilkes
- Gary Wilkins
- Marcus Wilkins
- Elijah Wilkinson
- Avery Williams
- Brian Williams
- Damien Williams
- Demorrio Williams
- Elijah Williams
- Gene Williams
- Jimmy Williams
- Joel Williams
- Keith Williams
- Michael Williams
- Nick Williams
- Richard Williams
- Sam Williams
- Shawn Williams
- Travis Williams
- Tyrone Williams
- Chris Williamson
- Matt Willig
- Mitch Willis
- Brenard Wilson
- Jim Wilson
- Josh Wilson
- Wade Wilson
- Marcus Wimberly
- Bill Windauer
- Leonard Wingate
- Randy Winkler
- Coy Wire
- Charlie Woerner
- Scott Woerner
- Bill Wolski
- Bo Wood
- Dennis Woodberry
- Josh Woods
- Logan Woodside
- Paul Worrilow
- Blidi Wreh-Wilson
- James Wright
- Jason Wright
- John Wright
- Nate Wright

== Y ==
- George Yarno
- T. J. Yates
- Jeff Yeates
- Ben Young
- Mitch Young
- Kevin Youngblood

== Z ==
- Olamide Zaccheaus
- Tony Zackery
- Mike Zandofsky
- Mike Zele
- Joe Zelenka
- Tony Zendejas
- Jeff Zgonina
- Justin Zimmer
- Geno Zimmerlink
- Keith Zinger
- John Zook
