= 1987 Atlanta Falcons season =

NFL team season

- Head coach: Marion Campbell
- Home stadium: Fulton County Stadium

Results
- Record: 3–12
- Division place: 4th NFC West
- Playoffs: Did not qualify
- Pro Bowlers: 2: G Bill Fralic; RB Gerald Riggs

The 1987 Atlanta Falcons season was the franchise's 22nd season in the National Football League (NFL). The Falcons finished with the worst record in the league, 3–12, and secured the first overall pick in the 1988 NFL draft. Head coach Marion Campbell started his second stint as Falcons head coach in 1987 after previously coaching the team from 1974–1976.

The last remaining active member of the 1987 Atlanta Falcons was Jessie Tuggle, who retired after the 2000 season.

== Offseason ==
=== NFL draft ===
1987 Atlanta Falcons draft
Round	Pick	Player	Position	College	Notes
1	13	Chris Miller *	Quarterback	Oregon	
2	31	Kenny Flowers	Running back	Clemson	from Green Bay
4	97	Ralph Van Dyke	Offensive tackle	Southern Illinois	
5	125	Mark Mraz	Defensive end	Utah State	
6	153	Paul Kiser	Guard	Wake Forest	
7	181	Michael Reid	Linebacker	Wisconsin	
8	208	Curtis Taliaferro	Linebacker	Virginia Tech	
9	236	Terrence Anthony	Defensive back	Iowa State	
10	264	Jerry Reese	Tight end	Illinois	
11	292	Elbert Shelley	Defensive back	Arkansas State	
12	320	Larry Emery	Running back	Wisconsin	
Made roster * Made at least one Pro Bowl during career

== Personnel ==
=== Staff ===
1987 Atlanta Falcons staff
Front office: Chairman of the board – Rankin M. Smith Sr.; President – Rankin M. Smith, Jr.; Executive vice president – Taylor Smith; Director of player personnel – Ken Herock; Director of pro personnel – Bill Jobko; Head coaches: Head coach – Marion Campbell; Offensive coaches: Assistant head coach/offense – Jim Hanifan; Offensive coordinator – Rod Dowhower; Running backs – Steve Crosby; Receivers – Jimmy Raye; Tight ends – Al Groh	Defensive coaches: Assistant head coach/defense – Fred Bruney; Defensive line – Tommy Brasher; Linebackers – Chuck Clausen; Defensive assistant – Claude Humphrey; Special teams coaches: Special teams – Al Groh; Strength and conditioning: Strength and conditioning – Tim Jorgensen

=== NFL replacement players ===
After the league decided to use replacement players during the NFLPA strike, the following team was assembled:

1987 Atlanta Falcons replacement roster
Quarterbacks: 10 Erik Kramer; 16 Jeff Van Raaphorst; Running backs: 24 Shelley Poole; 29 Bob Norris; 32 Norm Granger; 33 Rick Badanjek; 39 Jerry Butler; 42 Michael Williams; 45 Darryl Oliver; 47 John Kamana; 48 Joe McIntosh; Wide receivers: 81 James Shibest; 82 Monty Sharpe; 83 Kirk Phillips; 84 Milton Barney; 85 Kwante Hampton; 86 Steve Griffin; 89 Leon Gonzalez; 92 Lenny Taylor; Tight ends: 47 Geno Zimmerlink; 87 John Evans; 87 Arnold Franklin; 88 Sylvester Byrd	Offensive linemen: 53 Jim Hendley C; 54 Eric Wiegand; 55 Reggie Smith; 61 Jeff Lee; 62 Greg Quick; 63 Howard Hood; 64 Lawrence Jackson LG; 65 Jim Kisner; 65 Pat Saindon RG; 66 Randy Clark RT; 66 Rick Hudson; 70 Fred Nelson; 71 Joe Harby; 73 Doug Mackie LT; 74 Don Robinson; 94 Ken Sutherland; Defensive linemen: 56 Joe Costello; 64 Lawrence Jackson; 67 Booker Reese; 68 Emanuel Weaver NT; 69 Fred Worthy; 71 Mitchell Young DE; 72 Buddy Moor; 75 Dwight Bingham; 76 Dwaine Morris RDE; 77 Leonard Wingate; 78 Mark Studaway LDE	Linebackers: 50 James Hall; 51 Herb Spencer ROLB; 52 Dan Fiala; 56 Art Price; 58 Ken Bowen; 59 Paul Gray; 93 Jim Laughlin RILB; 95 Kenny Driskell; 96 Rich Kraynak LILB; 99 Tim Green LOLB; Defensive backs: 20 Struggy Smith; 21 Chuck Clanton; 23 Gary Moss FS; 25 Leon Thomasson LCB; 26 Jerome Norris; 28 Charles Huff; 30 Lyndell Jones RCB; 34 Mike Lush SS; 37 Leander Knight; Special teams: 3 John Starnes P; 4 Ricky Anderson P; 5 Greg Davis K; 6 Louis Berry P

=== Roster ===
1987 Atlanta Falcons roster
Quarterbacks (QB): 16 David Archer; 10 Scott Campbell; 14 Erik Kramer; 12 Chris Miller; Running backs (RB): 31 Major Everett; 48 Kenny Flowers; 42 Gerald Riggs; 44 John Settle; 29 Sylvester Stamps; Wide receivers (WR): 82 Stacey Bailey; 89 Charlie Brown; 86 Floyd Dixon; 81 Billy "White Shoes" Johnson; 83 Aubrey Matthews; Tight ends (TE): 88 Arthur Cox; 87 Ron Middleton; 80 Dan Sharp	Offensive linemen (OL): 64 Jamie Dukes C/G; 79 Bill Fralic G; 78 Mike Kenn T; 63 Jeff Kiewel G; 62 Brett Miller T; 73 Leonard Mitchell T; 55 Wayne Radloff C; 61 John Scully G; Defensive linemen (DL): 98 Greg Brown DE; 77 Rick Bryan DE; 76 Mike Gann DE; 68 Dennis Harrison DE; 67 Mark Mraz DE; 72 Andrew Provence NT	Linebackers (LB): 56 Joe Costello ILB; 96 Rich Kraynak ILB; 93 Jim Laughlin ILB; 95 Michael Reid ILB; 58 Jessie Tuggle OLB; 51 Reggie Wilkes OLB; 54 Joel Williams OLB; Defensive backs (DB): 26 James Britt CB; 23 Bobby Butler CB; 25 Scott Case CB; 30 David Croudip CB; 41 Tim Gordon FS; 34 Robert Moore SS; 37 Elbert Shelley SS; 22 Brenard Wilson FS; Special teams (ST): 53 Doug Barnett LS; 3 Rick Donnelly P; 18 Mick Luckhurst K	Reserve: 75 Tony Casillas NT (IR); 20 Wendell Cason S (IR); 28 Bret Clark S (IR); 50 Buddy Curry LB (IR); 24 Larry Emery RB (IR); 99 Tim Green LB (IR); -- Billy Hinson T (IR); 40 Eddie Meyers RB (Military); 59 John Rade LB (IR); 45 Ken Whisenhunt TE (IR); Rookies in italics

== Regular season ==
=== Schedule ===
Week	Date	Opponent	Result	Record	Venue	Attendance
1	September 13	at Tampa Bay Buccaneers	**L** 10–48	0–1	Tampa Stadium	51,250
2	September 20	Washington Redskins	**W** 21–20	1–1	Atlanta–Fulton County Stadium	50,882
–	September 27	at **New Orleans Saints**	canceled			
3	October 4	Pittsburgh Steelers	**L** 12–28	1–2	Atlanta–Fulton County Stadium	16,667
4	October 11	**San Francisco 49ers**	**L** 17–25	1–3	Atlanta–Fulton County Stadium	8,684
5	October 18	**Los Angeles Rams**	**W** 24–20	2–3	Atlanta–Fulton County Stadium	15,813
6	October 25	at Houston Oilers	**L** 33–37	2–4	Astrodome	29,062
7	November 1	**New Orleans Saints**	**L** 0–38	2–5	Atlanta–Fulton County Stadium	42,196
8	November 8	at Cleveland Browns	**L** 3–38	2–6	Cleveland Municipal Stadium	71,135
9	November 15	Cincinnati Bengals	**L** 10–16	2–7	Atlanta–Fulton County Stadium	25,758
10	November 22	at Minnesota Vikings	**L** 13–24	2–8	Hubert H. Humphrey Metrodome	53,866
11	November 29	St. Louis Cardinals	**L** 21–34	2–9	Atlanta–Fulton County Stadium	15,909
12	December 6	at Dallas Cowboys	**W** 21–10	3–9	Texas Stadium	40,103
13	December 13	at **Los Angeles Rams**	**L** 0–33	3–10	Anaheim Stadium	43,310
14	December 20	at **San Francisco 49ers**	**L** 7–35	3–11	Candlestick Park	54,698
15	December 27	Detroit Lions	**L** 13–30	3–12	Atlanta–Fulton County Stadium	13,906
Note: Intra-division opponents are in **bold** text.

=== Standings ===
NFC West
	W	L	T	PCT	DIV	CONF	PF	PA	STK
San Francisco 49ers^{(1)}	13	2	0	.867	5–1	10–1	459	253	W6
New Orleans Saints^{(4)}	12	3	0	.800	4–1	8–3	426	283	W9
Los Angeles Rams	6	9	0	.400	1–5	5–7	317	361	L2
Atlanta Falcons	3	12	0	.200	1–4	3–8	205	436	L3
