= 1985 Atlanta Falcons season =

NFL team season

- Owner: Rankin M. Smith Sr.
- General manager: Tom Braatz
- Head coach: Dan Henning
- Home stadium: Fulton County Stadium

Results
- Record: 4–12
- Division place: 4th NFC West
- Playoffs: Did not qualify
- Pro Bowlers: 1: RB Gerald Riggs

The 1985 Atlanta Falcons season was the franchise’s 20th season in the National Football League (NFL). They finished last in the NFC West with a record of four wins and twelve losses.

This season marked the first time since 1972 that the Falcons played the Kansas City Chiefs, and merely the second in team history. The reason for this is that before the admission of the Texans in 2002, NFL scheduling formulas for games outside a team’s division were much more influenced by table position during the previous season. They were provisionally scheduled to play in 1976, but that game was scrapped to make room for games against the newly formed Buccaneers and Seahawks, and actually scheduled to play in 1982, but that game was cancelled by a player's strike.

== Offseason ==
=== NFL draft ===
1985 Atlanta Falcons draft
Round	Pick	Player	Position	College	Notes
1	2	Bill Fralic *	Guard	Pittsburgh	
2	45	Mike Gann	Defensive end	Notre Dame	
4	89	Emile Harry	Wide receiver	Stanford	
6	152	Reggie Pleasant	Cornerback	Clemson	
8	201	Ashley Lee	Safety	Virginia Tech	
8	215	Ronnie Washington	Linebacker	Northeast Louisiana	
9	228	Micah Moon	Linebacker	North Carolina	
10	257	Brent Martin	Center	Stanford	
11	284	John Ayres	Cornerback	Illinois	
12	313	Ken Whisenhunt	Tight end	Georgia Tech	
Made roster * Made at least one Pro Bowl during career

=== Undrafted free agents ===
1985 undrafted free agents of note
Player	Position	College
Melvin Dean	Cornerback	Pittsburgh
Chucky Davis	Running back	Wisconsin
Tiger Greene	Cornerback	Western Carolina
Mike Jones	Wide receiver	Wisconsin
Nick Llewellyn	Guard	Missouri
Art Price	Linebacker	Wisconsin
Leon Thomasson	Cornerback	Texas Southern
Alvin Ward	Guard	Miami (FL)

== Personnel ==
=== Staff ===
1985 Atlanta Falcons staff
Front office: Chairman of the board – Rankin M. Smith Sr.; President – Rankin M. Smith, Jr.; Executive vice president/chief operating officer – Eddie LeBaron; General manager – Tom Braatz; Head coaches: Head coach – Dan Henning; Offensive coaches: Running backs – Sam Elliott; Receivers – Bob Harrison; Offensive line – Larry Beightol; Tight ends/h-backs – Garry Puetz	Defensive coaches: Assistant head coach/defensive line – Dan Sekanovich; Defensive coordinator – John Marshall; Linebackers – Bobby Jackson; Secondary – Jack Stanton; Defensive assistant – Joe Madden; Special teams coaches: Special teams – Ted Fritsch; Strength and conditioning: Strength and conditioning – George Dostal

=== Roster ===
1985 Atlanta Falcons roster
Quarterbacks (QB): 16 David Archer; 8 Bob Holly; Running backs (RB): 42 Gerald Riggs; 29 Sylvester Stamps; 32 Tim Tyrrell; 24 Joe Washington; Wide receivers (WR): 85 Anthony Allen; 82 Stacey Bailey; 89 Charlie Brown; 81 Billy "White Shoes" Johnson; Tight ends (TE): 87 Cliff Benson; 88 Arthur Cox; 49 Allama Matthews; 45 Ken Whisenhunt	Offensive linemen (OL): 79 Bill Fralic G; 71 Glen Howe T; 63 Jeff Kiewel G; 62 Brett Miller T; 55 Wayne Radloff C; 67 Eric Sanders T; 66 Chuck Thomas C; 57 Jeff Van Note C; Defensive linemen (DL): 69 Dan Benish DT; 77 Rick Bryan DE; 76 Mike Gann DE; 70 Willard Goff DT; 74 Mike Pitts DT; 72 Andrew Provence DE	Linebackers (LB): 53 Thomas Benson MLB; 50 Buddy Curry MLB; 58 David Frye OLB; 59 John Rade OLB; 56 Al Richardson OLB; 96 Johnny Taylor OLB; 92 Ronnie Washington MLB; Defensive backs (DB): 23 Bobby Butler CB; 25 Scott Case SS; 20 Wendell Cason CB; 30 David Croudip CB; 37 Kenny Johnson SS; 27 Tom Pridemore FS; 22 Sean Thomas FS; 36 Dan Wagoner CB; Special teams (ST): 1 Ralph Giacomarro P; 18 Mick Luckhurst K	Reserve: 39 Cliff Austin RB (IR); 38 John Ayres CB (IR); 26 James Britt CB (IR); 3 Rick Donnelly P (IR); 33 Tiger Greene S (IR); 78 Mike Kenn T (IR); 93 Brent Martin C (IR); 52 Rydell Melancon LB (IR); 40 Eddie Meyers RB (Military); 64 Joe Pellegrini G (IR); 61 John Scully G (IR); Rookies in italics

== Regular season ==
=== Schedule ===
Week	Date	Opponent	Result	Record	Venue	Attendance	Recap
1	September 8	Detroit Lions	**L** 27–28	0–1	Atlanta–Fulton County Stadium	37,785	Recap
2	September 15	at **San Francisco 49ers**	**L** 16–35	0–2	Candlestick Park	58,923	Recap
3	September 22	Denver Broncos	**L** 28–44	0–3	Atlanta–Fulton County Stadium	37,903	Recap
4	September 29	at **Los Angeles Rams**	**L** 6–17	0–4	Anaheim Stadium	49,870	Recap
5	October 6	**San Francisco 49ers**	**L** 17–38	0–5	Atlanta–Fulton County Stadium	44,740	Recap
6	October 13	at Seattle Seahawks	**L** 26–30	0–6	Kingdome	60,430	Recap
7	October 20	**New Orleans Saints**	**W** 31–24	1–6	Atlanta–Fulton County Stadium	44,784	Recap
8	October 27	at Dallas Cowboys	**L** 10–24	1–7	Texas Stadium	57,941	Recap
9	November 3	Washington Redskins	**L** 10–44	1–8	Atlanta–Fulton County Coliseum	42,209	Recap
10	November 10	at Philadelphia Eagles	**L** 17–23	1–9	Veterans Stadium	63,694	Recap
11	November 17	**Los Angeles Rams**	**W** 30–14	2–9	Atlanta–Fulton County Stadium	29,960	Recap
12	November 24	at Chicago Bears	**L** 0–36	2–10	Soldier Field	61,769	Recap
13	December 1	Los Angeles Raiders	**L** 24–43	2–11	Atlanta–Fulton County Stadium	20,858	Recap
14	December 8	at Kansas City Chiefs	**L** 10–38	2–12	Arrowhead Stadium	18,199	Recap
15	December 15	Minnesota Vikings	**W** 14–13	3–12	Atlanta–Fulton County Stadium	14,167	Recap
16	December 22	at **New Orleans Saints**	**W** 16–10	4–12	Louisiana Superdome	37,717	Recap
Note: Intra-division opponents are in **bold** text.

=== Game summaries ===
==== Week 10 ====
Team	1	2	3	4	OT	Total
Falcons	0	0	0	17	0	17
• Eagles	0	14	3	0	6	23

- Date: November 10
- Location: Veterans Stadium, Philadelphia
- Game start: 1:00 p.m.
- Game weather: 61 °F (16 °C), wind 16 mph (26 km/h)
- Referee: Chuck Heberling

Scoring summary
2	PHI	Earnest Jackson 8 yard run (Paul McFadden kick)	Eagles 7–0
2	PHI	Ron Jaworski 1 yard run (Paul McFadden kick)	Eagles 14–0
3	PHI	Paul McFadden 30 yard field goal	Eagles 17–0
4	ATL	Joe Washington 18 yard pass from David Archer (Mick Luckhurst kick)	Eagles 17–7
4	ATL	Gerald Riggs 1 yard run (Mick Luckhurst kick)	Eagles 17–14
4	ATL	Mick Luckhurst 27 yard field goal	Tie 17–17
OT	PHI	Mike Quick 99 yard pass from Ron Jaworski	Eagles 23–17

=== Standings ===
NFC West
	W	L	T	PCT	DIV	CONF	PF	PA	STK
Los Angeles Rams^{(2)}	11	5	0	.688	3–3	8–4	340	277	L1
San Francisco 49ers^{(5)}	10	6	0	.625	4–2	7–5	411	263	W2
New Orleans Saints	5	11	0	.313	2–4	5–7	294	401	L3
Atlanta Falcons	4	12	0	.250	3–3	4–8	282	452	W2

== Awards and records ==
- Bill Fralic, Sports Illustrated NFL Rookie of the Year.
