= List of NFL players (McMur–My) =

This is a list of players who have appeared in at least one regular season or postseason game in the National Football League (NFL), American Football League (AFL), or All-America Football Conference (AAFC) and have a last name that falls between "McMur" and "My". For the rest of the M's, see list of NFL players (Ma–McMul). This list is accurate through the end of the 2025 NFL season.

== McMur–McW ==
- Chuck McMurtry
- Greg McMurtry
- Dexter McNabb
- Donovan McNabb
- Steve McNair
- Todd McNair
- Frank McNally
- Austin McNamara
- Johnny "Blood" McNally
- Bob McNamara
- Ed McNamara
- Tom McNamara
- Sean McNanie
- Josh McNary
- Don McNeal
- Reggie McNeal
- Travis McNeal
- Charlie McNeil
- Clifton McNeil
- Emanuel McNeil
- Frank McNeil
- Freeman McNeil
- Gerald McNeil
- Pat McNeil
- Ryan McNeil
- Alim McNeill
- Fred McNeill
- Marcus McNeill
- Mike McNeill
- Rod McNeill
- Tom McNeill
- Bill McNellis
- Jeremy McNichols
- Bruce McNorton
- Cade McNown
- Paul McNulty
- Marvin McNutt
- Bill McPeak
- Buck McPhail
- Hal McPhail
- Jerris McPhail
- Zech McPhearson
- Frank McPhee
- Pernell McPhee
- Evan McPherson
- Forrest McPherson
- Miles McPherson
- Johnny McQuade
- Dan McQuaid
- Jake McQuaide
- Ed McQuarters
- R. W. McQuarters
- Jack McQuary
- Leon McQuay
- Leon McQuay III
- Kim McQuilken
- Pat McQuistan
- Paul McQuistan
- Bennie McRae
- Charles McRae
- Frank McRae
- Jerrold McRae
- Tony McRae
- Gerald McRath
- Bill McRaven
- Bob McRoberts
- Paul McRoberts
- Wade McRoberts
- Charles McShane
- Joe McShea
- Trace McSorley
- Chuck McSwain
- Rod McSwain
- Tim McTyer
- Torry McTyer
- Warren McVea
- John McVeigh
- Bill McWatters
- Bill McWilliams
- Johnny McWilliams
- Mac McWilliams
- Shorty McWilliams

== Me ==
- Robert Meachem
- Jack Mead
- Jim Meade
- Mike Meade
- Ed Meador
- Nate Meadors
- Ralph Meadow
- Adam Meadows
- Darryl Meadows
- Ed Meadows
- Johnny Meads
- Jack Meagher
- Rondell Mealey
- Tim Meamber
- Montrel Meander
- Bub Means
- Dave Means
- Natrone Means
- Steven Means
- Brandon Mebane
- Curt Mecham
- Karl Mecklenburg
- Jamie Meder
- Dan Medlin
- Richard Medlin
- Justin Medlock
- Kain Medrano
- Ron Medved
- Greg Meehan
- Butch Meeker
- Bob Meeks
- Bryant Meeks
- Eddie Meeks
- Jackson Meeks
- Jonathan Meeks
- Quenton Meeks
- Ward Meese
- Brad Meester
- Dave Meggett
- Dave Meggyesy
- Marc Megna
- Charley Mehelich
- Tony Mehelich
- Lance Mehl
- Taylor Mehlhaff
- Harry Mehre
- Pete Mehringer
- Carson Meier
- Kerry Meier
- Rob Meier
- Shad Meier
- Steve Meilinger
- Dale Meinert
- Quinn Meinerz
- George Meinhardt
- Darrel Meisenheimer
- Bill Meisner
- Greg Meisner
- Ed Meixler
- Patrick Mekari
- Jon Melander
- Ifeatu Melifonwu
- Obi Melifonwu
- Mike Melinkovich
- Jim Melka
- John Mellekas
- Jim Mello
- Dutch Mellody
- John Mellus
- Andrew Melontree
- Bo Melton
- Henry Melton
- Max Melton
- Terrence Melton
- Dan Melville
- Rashaan Melvin
- Tom Melvin
- Armand Membou
- Dale Memmelaar
- Don Menasco
- John Mendenhall
- Ken Mendenhall
- Mat Mendenhall
- Rashard Mendenhall
- Terry Mendenhall
- Mario Mendez
- Ruben Mendoza
- Pep Menefee
- Vic Menefee
- Chuck Mercein
- Giradie Mercer
- Ken Mercer
- Mike Mercer
- Whitney Mercilus
- Cameron Meredith
- Don Meredith
- Dudley Meredith
- Jamon Meredith
- Jordan Meredith
- Russ Meredith
- Mike Mergen
- Art Mergenthal
- Lou Merillat
- Brandon Meriweather
- Monte Merkel
- Guido Merkens
- Ed Merkle
- Elmer Merkovsky
- Ed Merlin
- Phillip Merling
- Jim Merlo
- Casey Merrill
- Forrest Merrill
- Mark Merrill
- Than Merrill
- Walt Merrill
- Sam Merriman
- Shawne Merriman
- Ahmad Merritt
- Dave Merritt
- Kirk Merritt
- Jim Merritts
- Kaevon Merriweather
- Mike Merriweather
- Jeff Merrow
- Scott Mersereau
- Jerry Mertens
- Jim Mertens
- Bus Mertes
- Aaron Merz
- Curt Merz
- Dick Mesak
- Mark Meseroll
- Zoltán Meskó
- Bruce Mesner
- Dale Messer
- Mark Messner
- Max Messner
- Frank Mestnik
- Bo Metcalf
- D.K. Metcalf
- Eric Metcalf
- Terrence Metcalf
- Terry Metcalf
- John Metchie
- Josh Metellus
- Russ Method
- Zach Mettenberger
- Pete Metzelaars
- Lou Metzger
- Kevin Meuth
- Harrison Mevis
- Jack Mewhort
- Andrew Meyer
- Dennis Meyer
- Eddie Meyer
- Ernie Meyer
- Fred Meyer
- Gil Meyer
- Jim Meyer
- John Meyer
- Ron Meyer
- Bob Meyers
- Jakobi Meyers
- Jerry Meyers
- John Meyers
- Klinks Meyers
- Paul Meyers
- Wayne Meylan

== Mi ==
- Larry Mialik
- Rich Miano
- Phil Micech
- Bill Michael
- Christine Michael
- Rich Michael
- Al Michaels
- Ed Michaels
- Lou Michaels
- Walt Michaels
- Art Michalik
- Mike Michalske
- Marken Michel
- Mike Michel
- Sony Michel
- Tom Michel
- John Michels (born 1931)
- John Michels (born 1973)
- Bobby Micho
- Mike Micka
- Jeff Mickel
- Darren Mickell
- Arnold Mickens
- Jaydon Mickens
- Ray Mickens
- R. J. Mickens
- Terry Mickens
- Joey Mickey
- Joe Mickles
- Dave Middendorf
- Oren Middlebrook
- Willie Middlebrooks
- Brandon Middleton
- Dave Middleton
- Doug Middleton
- Frank Middleton (born 1960)
- Frank Middleton (born 1974)
- Kelvin Middleton
- Rick Middleton
- Ron Middleton
- Terdell Middleton
- William Middleton
- Lou Midler
- Saul Mielziner
- Ed Mieszkowski
- Paul Migliazzo
- Lou Mihajlovich
- Joe Mihal
- Brian Mihalik
- Bob Mike
- Quintin Mikell
- Nick Mike-Mayer
- Steve Mike-Mayer
- Russ Mikeska
- Andy Miketa
- Bill Miklich
- Ron Mikolajczyk
- Pete Mikolajewski
- Doug Mikolas
- Tom Mikula
- Mike Mikulak
- Barnes Milam
- Joe Milam
- Don Milan
- Archie Milano
- Matt Milano
- Scott Milanovich
- Darryl Milburn
- Glyn Milburn
- Jack Mildren
- John Milem
- Buck Miles
- Eddie Miles
- Edmond Miles
- Jeromy Miles
- Joshua Miles
- Leo Miles
- Ostell Miles
- Rontez Miles
- Itula Mili
- Joe Milinichik
- John Milks
- Bryan Millard
- Keith Millard
- Hugh Millen
- Matt Millen
- Al Miller
- Alan Miller
- Allen Miller
- Anthony Miller (born 1965)
- Anthony Miller (born 1994)
- Arnold Miller
- Bill Miller (born 1936)
- Bill Miller (born 1940)
- Billy Miller
- Bing Miller
- Blake Miller (born 1889)
- Blake Miller (born 1968)
- Bob Miller
- Brandon Miller
- Braxton Miller
- Brett Miller
- Brit Miller
- Bronzell Miller
- Bruce Miller
- Bubba Miller
- Caleb Miller
- Calvin Miller
- Candy Miller
- Chris Miller
- Christian Miller
- Chuckie Miller
- Clark Miller
- Clay Miller
- Cleo Miller
- Corey Miller
- Craig Miller
- Dan Miller
- Dante Miller
- Darrian Miller
- Darrin Miller
- Don Miller (born 1902)
- Don Miller (born 1932)
- Donald Miller
- Doug Miller
- Drew Miller
- Dub Miller
- Dutch Miller
- Eddie Miller (born 1916)
- Eddie Miller (born 1969)
- Fred Miller (born 1931)
- Fred Miller (born 1940)
- Fred Miller (born 1973)
- Gabe Miller
- Hal Miller
- Harlan Miller
- Heath Miller
- Heinie Miller
- Herb Miller
- Jamir Miller
- Jim Miller (born 1908)
- Jim Miller (born 1949)
- Jim Miller (born 1957)
- Jim Miller (born 1971)
- John Miller (born 1894)
- John Miller (born 1934)
- John Miller (born 1960)
- John Miller (born 1966)
- John Miller (born 1993)
- Johnny Miller
- Jordan Miller (born 1988)
- Jordan Miller (born 1997)
- Josh Miller
- Junior Miller
- Justin Miller
- Keith Miller
- Kendre Miller
- Kevin Miller
- Kolton Miller
- Kyle Miller
- Lamar Miller
- Larry Miller
- Les Miller
- Lonyae Miller
- Mark Miller (born 1956)
- Mark Miller (born 1962)
- Matt Miller
- Mike Miller
- Nate Miller
- Nick Miller (born 1963)
- Nick Miller (born 1987)
- Ookie Miller
- Pat Miller
- Paul Miller (born 1913)
- Paul Miller (born 1930)
- Primo Miller
- Prince Miller
- Ralph Miller
- Robert Miller
- Ron Miller (born 1933)
- Ron Miller (born 1939)
- Roy Miller
- Ryan Miller (born 1989)
- Ryan Miller (born 2000)
- Scott Miller
- Scotty Miller
- Shareef Miller
- Shawn Miller
- Solomon Miller
- Terry Miller (born 1946)
- Terry Miller (born 1956)
- Tom Miller
- Ventrell Miller
- Verne Miller
- Von Miller
- Willie Miller
- Zach Miller (born 1984)
- Zach Miller (born 1985)
- Hanik Milligan
- Rolan Milligan
- Dee Milliner
- Bert Milling
- James Milling
- Ted Million
- Bob Millman
- Wayne Millner
- Lawyer Milloy
- Bryan Mills
- Charlie Mills
- Davis Mills
- Denver Mills
- Dick Mills
- Ernie Mills
- Garrett Mills
- Jalen Mills
- Javor Mills
- Jeff Mills
- Jim Mills (born 1961)
- Jim Mills (born 1973)
- Joe Mills
- John Henry Mills
- Jordan Mills
- Lamar Mills
- Pete Mills
- Rylie Mills
- Sam Mills
- Stan Mills
- Brian Milne
- Dax Milne
- Bill Milner
- Billy Milner
- Martrez Milner
- Ray Milo
- Rich Milot
- Jalen Milroe
- Century Milstead
- Charlie Milstead
- Rod Milstead
- Christopher Milton
- Eldridge Milton
- Gene Milton
- Joe Milton
- Johnny Milton
- Keavon Milton
- Kendall Milton
- Wyatt Milum
- Amarius Mims
- Chris Mims
- David Mims
- Denzel Mims
- Jordan Mims
- Marvin Mims
- Henry Minarik
- Jeremy Mincey
- Charles Mincy
- Tom Miner
- Barkevious Mingo
- Gene Mingo
- Jonathan Mingo
- Paul Minick
- Kevin Miniefield
- Frank Minini
- Skip Minisi
- Randy Minniear
- Chase Minnifield
- Frank Minnifield
- Snoop Minnis
- Claudie Minor
- Kobee Minor
- Kory Minor
- Lincoln Minor
- Travis Minor
- Vic Minor
- Gardner Minshew
- Barry Minter
- Cedric Minter
- Kevin Minter
- Michael Minter
- Mike Minter
- Tom Minter
- Zach Minter
- Jack Mintun
- Andre Mintze
- Ed Mioduszewski
- Frank Miotke
- George Mira
- Dean Miraldi
- Paul Miranda
- Brandon Miree
- Rick Mirer
- Rex Mirich
- Bob Mischak
- Dave Mishel
- Koa Misi
- John Misko
- Dwayne Missouri
- John Mistler
- Gene Mitcham
- Aaron Mitchell
- Adonai Mitchell
- Al Mitchell
- Alvin Mitchell (born 1943)
- Alvin Mitchell (born 1964)
- Anthony Mitchell
- Basil Mitchell
- Bob Mitchell
- Bobby Mitchell
- Brandon Mitchell
- Brian Mitchell (born August 18, 1968)
- Brian Mitchell (born December 13, 1968)
- Buster Mitchell
- Cameron Mitchell
- Carlton Mitchell
- Charles Mitchell
- Charley Mitchell
- Charlie Mitchell
- Dale Mitchell
- DaMarcus Mitchell
- Derrell Mitchell
- Devon Mitchell
- Donald Mitchell
- Earl Mitchell
- Ed Mitchell
- Elijah Mitchell
- Fondren Mitchell
- Freddie Mitchell
- Hal Mitchell
- James Mitchell
- Jayme Mitchell
- Jeff Mitchell
- Jim Mitchell (born 1947)
- Jim Mitchell (born 1948)
- Johnny Mitchell
- Kawika Mitchell
- Keaton Mitchell
- Keith Mitchell
- Ken Mitchell
- Kevin Mitchell
- Lance Mitchell
- Leonard Mitchell
- Leroy Mitchell
- Lydell Mitchell
- Mack Mitchell
- Malcolm Mitchell
- Martin Mitchell
- Marko Mitchell
- Marvin Mitchell
- Max Mitchell
- Mel Mitchell
- Melvin Mitchell
- Mike Mitchell (born 1961)
- Mike Mitchell (born 1987)
- Myron Mitchell
- Paul Mitchell
- Pete Mitchell
- Qasim Mitchell
- Quinyon Mitchell
- Randall Mitchell
- Roland Mitchell
- Russell Mitchell
- Scott Mitchell
- Shannon Mitchell
- Shirdonya Mitchell
- Stan Mitchell
- Steven Mitchell
- Stump Mitchell
- Ted Mitchell
- Terrance Mitchell
- Tom Mitchell
- Tywan Mitchell
- Willie Mitchell
- Zaire Mitchell-Paden
- Robert Mitinger
- Matt Mitrione
- Alonzo Mitz
- Anthony Mix
- Bryant Mix
- Ron Mix
- Billy Mixon
- Joe Mixon
- Kenny Mixon
- Warner Mizell
- Taquan Mizzell

== Moa–Moo ==
- David Moa
- Fili Moala
- Kelly Moan
- Arthur Moats
- Ryan Moats
- John Mobley
- Orson Mobley
- Rudy Mobley
- Singor Mobley
- Stacey Mobley
- Dontay Moch
- Mike Mock
- Charlie Mockmore
- Jeff Modesitt
- Dick Modzelewski
- Ed Modzelewski
- Hal Moe
- Tony Moeaki
- Dicky Moegle
- Eddie Moegle
- Tre'von Moehrig
- Jovante Moffatt
- Tim Moffett
- John Moffitt
- Mike Moffitt
- Mike Mohamed
- John Mohardt
- Chris Mohr
- John Mohring
- Mike Mohring
- Louie Mohs
- Dick Moje
- Ralf Mojsiejenko
- John Molchon
- Alex Molden
- Antwaun Molden
- Elijah Molden
- Frank Molden
- Fred Molden
- Bo Molenda
- Keith Molesworth
- Jim Molinaro
- Lou Molinet
- David Molk
- Tony Moll
- Les Molloy
- Ifeanyi Momah
- Bob Momsen
- Tony Momsen
- Jim Monachino
- Ray Monaco
- Rob Monaco
- Ron Monaco
- Regis Monahan
- Kyle Monangai
- Derrick Moncrief
- Donte Moncrief
- Kellen Mond
- Henry Mondeaux
- Smael Mondon
- Mario Monds
- Wonder Monds
- Bryan Mone
- Avery Monfort
- Matt Monger
- Jonah Monheim
- Art Monk
- Jacob Monk
- Quincy Monk
- Bob Monnett
- Carl Monroe
- Eugene Monroe
- Henry Monroe
- Jarius Monroe
- Rod Monroe
- Tommy Mont
- Dave Montagne
- Mel Montalbo
- Joe Montana
- Alton Montgomery
- Anthony Montgomery
- Bill Montgomery (born 1909)
- Bill Montgomery (born 1923)
- Blanchard Montgomery
- Cleo Montgomery
- Cliff Montgomery
- David Montgomery
- D. J. Montgomery
- Glenn Montgomery
- Greg Montgomery
- Jim Montgomery
- Joe Montgomery
- Marv Montgomery
- Michael Montgomery
- Mike Montgomery
- Monty Montgomery
- Randy Montgomery
- Ross Montgomery
- Scottie Montgomery
- Sully Montgomery
- Ty Montgomery
- Tyrone Montgomery
- Wilbert Montgomery
- Will Montgomery
- Mike Montler
- Sankar Montoute
- Max Montoya
- Mark Montreuil
- Pete Monty
- Jake Moody
- Keith Moody
- Nick Moody
- Wilkie Moody
- Doug Mooers
- Aaron Moog
- Jeremiah Moon
- Warren Moon
- Collin Mooney
- Darnell Mooney
- Ed Mooney
- George Mooney
- Jim Mooney
- Mike Mooney
- Tex Mooney
- Tim Mooney
- Tipp Mooney
- Buddy Moor
- Moore
- A. J. Moore
- Al Moore
- Alex Moore
- Allen Moore
- Alvin Moore
- Arthur Moore
- Bill Moore
- Blake Moore
- Bob Moore
- Booker Moore
- Brandon Moore (born 1970)
- Brandon Moore (born 1979)
- Brandon Moore (born 1980)
- Brent Moore
- Bucky Moore
- Charlie Moore
- Chris Moore
- C. J. Moore
- Clarence Moore
- Cliff Moore
- Corey Moore (born 1979)
- Corey Moore (born 1993)
- D. J. Moore (born 1987)
- D. J. Moore (born 1997)
- Damon Moore
- Damontre Moore
- Dan Moore
- Dana Moore
- Darryl Moore
- Dave Moore
- David Moore
- Dean Moore
- Denarius Moore
- Denis Moore
- Derland Moore
- Derrick Moore
- Devin Moore
- Dinty Moore
- Dre Moore
- Eddie Moore
- Elijah Moore
- Eric Moore (born 1965)
- Eric Moore (born 1981)
- Evan Moore
- Fred Moore
- Gene Moore (born 1912)
- Gene Moore (born 1947)
- Greg Moore
- Henry Moore
- Herman Moore
- Jason Moore (born 1976)
- Jason Moore (born 1995)
- Jaylon Moore
- Jeff Moore (born 1956)
- Jeff Moore (born 1957)
- Jerald Moore
- Jerry Moore
- Jimmy Moore
- J'Mon Moore
- Joe Moore
- Joshua Moore
- Kamrin Moore
- Kareem Moore
- Kellen Moore
- Kelvin Moore
- Ken Moore (born 1917)
- Ken Moore (born 1954)
- Kenneth Moore
- Kenny Moore II
- Kyle Moore
- Lance Moore
- Langston Moore
- Larry Moore
- Lenny Moore
- Leonard Moore
- Leroy Moore
- Mack Moore
- Malachi Moore
- Malcolm Moore
- Manfred Moore
- Mark Moore
- Marlon Moore
- Marty Moore
- Matt Moore
- Maulty Moore
- McNeil Moore
- Mewelde Moore
- Michael Moore
- Nat Moore
- Nick Moore
- Paul Moore
- Rahim Moore
- Randy Moore
- Rashad Moore
- Red Moore
- Reynaud Moore
- Rich Moore
- Ricky Moore
- Rob Moore
- Robert Moore
- Rocco Moore
- Ron Moore
- Ronald Moore
- Rondale Moore
- Shawn Moore
- Sio Moore
- Skai Moore
- Skyy Moore
- Sterling Moore
- Steve Moore
- Stevon Moore
- Tarvarius Moore
- Tom Moore
- Wayne Moore
- Wilbur Moore
- Will Moore
- William Moore
- Zach Moore
- Zeke Moore
- Aaron Moorehead
- Emery Moorehead
- Kindal Moorehead
- John Mooring
- Brian Moorman
- Mo Moorman
- Jim Mooty

== Mor–Moy ==
- Tim Morabito
- Gonzalo Morales
- Eric Moran
- Frank Moran
- Hap Moran
- Jim Moran (born 1912)
- Jim Moran (born 1942)
- Rich Moran
- Sean Moran
- Tom Moran
- Johnnie Morant
- Doug Moreau
- Fabian Moreau
- Foster Moreau
- Frank Moreau
- Joe Moreino
- Earthwind Moreland
- Jake Moreland
- Jimmy Moreland
- Fran Morelli
- John Morelli
- Vernand Morency
- Jalen Moreno-Cropper
- Knowshon Moreno
- Moses Moreno
- Zeke Moreno
- Tim Moresco
- Sean Morey
- Arnold Morgado
- Aaron Morgan
- Anthony Morgan
- Bill Morgan
- Bob Morgan
- Bobby Morgan
- Boyd "Red" Morgan
- DaJuan Morgan
- Dan Morgan (born 1964)
- Dan Morgan (born 1978)
- David Morgan II
- Dennis Morgan
- Derrick Morgan
- Don Morgan
- Donovan Morgan
- Dwayne Morgan
- Joe Morgan (born 1928)
- Joe Morgan (born 1988)
- Jordan Morgan
- Josh Morgan
- Karl Morgan
- Matt Morgan
- Melvin Morgan
- Mike Morgan (born 1942)
- Mike Morgan (born 1956)
- Mike Morgan (born 1988)
- Quincy Morgan
- Stanley Morgan
- Stanley Morgan Jr.
- Larry Moriarty
- Pat Moriarty
- Tom Moriarty
- Milt Morin
- Brett Moritz
- Sam Morley
- Steve Morley
- Jack Morlock
- Mike Moroski
- Cameron Morrah
- Earl Morrall
- Kyle Morrell
- Alfred Morris
- Aric Morris
- Bam Morris
- Bob Morris (born 1903)
- Bob Morris (born 1925)
- Chris Morris (born 1949)
- Chris Morris (born 1983)
- Darryl Morris
- Dennit Morris
- Donnie Joe Morris
- Dwaine Morris
- Frank Morris
- George Morris (born 1919)
- George Morris (born 1931)
- Glen Morris
- Jack Morris
- James Morris
- Jamie Morris
- Jim Bob Morris
- Joe Morris
- Johnny Morris
- Jon Morris
- Larry Morris (born 1933)
- Larry Morris (born 1962)
- Lee Morris
- Maurice Morris
- Max Morris
- Mercury Morris
- Mike Morris (born 1961)
- Mike Morris (born 2001)
- Patrick Morris
- Quintin Morris
- Randall Morris
- Raymond Morris
- Riley Morris
- Rob Morris
- Ron Morris
- Sammy Morris
- Sylvester Morris
- Tom Morris
- Victor Morris
- Wanya Morris
- Wayne Morris
- Antonio Morrison
- Benjamin Morrison
- Darryl Morrison
- Dave Morrison
- Dennis Morrison
- Doc Morrison
- Don Morrison
- Fred "Curly" Morrison
- Joe Morrison
- Kirk Morrison
- Pat Morrison
- Pop Morrison
- Reece Morrison
- Ron Morrison
- Steve Morrison
- Tim Morrison
- Guy Morriss
- Frank Morrissey
- Jim Morrissey
- Jimmy Morrissey
- Bob Morrow
- Harold Morrow
- Jim Morrow
- John Morrow
- Nicholas Morrow
- Russ Morrow
- Tommy Morrow
- Bobby Morse
- Butch Morse
- Mitch Morse
- Red Morse
- Steve Morse
- Thomas Morstead
- Emmett Mortell
- Chad Morton
- Christian Morton
- Craig Morton
- Dave Morton
- Greg Morton
- Jack Morton
- John Morton
- Johnnie Morton
- Michael Morton
- Mike Morton
- Frank Morze
- Arron Mosby
- Monk Moscrip
- Don Mosebar
- Emmanuel Moseley
- Mark Moseley
- Dom Moselle
- Quandre Mosely
- Bob Moser
- Rick Moser
- Ted Moser
- Dezman Moses
- Don Moses
- Haven Moses
- J. J. Moses
- Kelvin Moses
- Morgan Moses
- Quentin Moses
- Clure Mosher
- John Mosier
- Anthony Mosley
- Brandon Mosley
- C. J. Mosley (born 1983)
- C. J. Mosley (born 1992)
- Henry Mosley
- Kendrick Mosley
- Mike Mosley
- Norm Mosley
- Russ Mosley
- Wayne Mosley
- Avery Moss
- Brent Moss
- Drew Moss
- Eddie Moss
- Gary Moss
- Jarvis Moss
- Joe Moss
- Martin Moss
- Paul Moss
- Perry Moss
- Randy Moss
- Riley Moss
- Roland Moss
- Santana Moss
- Sinorice Moss
- Winston Moss
- Zack Moss
- Zefross Moss
- Rich Mostardi
- Raheem Mostert
- Kelley Mote
- Adrian Moten
- Bobby Moten
- Eric Moten
- Gary Moten
- Mike Moten
- Bob Motl
- Marion Motley
- Parnell Motley
- Taylor Moton
- Buster Mott
- Joe Mott
- Steve Mott
- Zeke Motta
- Eric Moulds
- Deiontrez Mount
- Jonas Mouton
- Ryan Mouton
- Zeke Mowatt
- Derek Moye
- Alex Moyer
- Ken Moyer
- Paul Moyer
- Dick Moynihan
- Tim Moynihan

== Mr–My ==
- Mark Mraz
- George Mrkonic
- Bob Mrosko
- Gene Mruczkowski
- Scott Mruczkowski
- Henoc Muamba
- Darius Muasau
- Rudy Mucha
- Roddrick Muckelroy
- Jerry Muckensturm
- Larry Mucker
- Howard Mudd
- Frank Muehlheuser
- Chuck Muelhaupt
- Jamie Mueller
- Vance Mueller
- Bill Muellner
- Garvin Mugg
- Ovie Mughelli
- Joe Muha
- Al-Quadin Muhammad
- Calvin Muhammad
- Muhsin Muhammad
- Mustafah Muhammad
- Don Muhlbach
- Horst Muhlmann
- Daniel Muir
- Stan Muirhead
- Israel Mukuamu
- Andrew Mukuba
- Mike Mularkey
- Joe Mulbarger
- Edwin Mulitalo
- Herb Mul-Key
- Tom Mullady
- Mark Mullaney
- Chief Mullen
- Davlin Mullen
- Gary Mullen
- Roderick Mullen
- Tom Mullen
- Trayvon Mullen
- Vern Mullen
- Carl Mulleneaux
- Lee Mulleneaux
- Nick Mullens
- Harold Muller
- George Mulligan
- Matthew Mulligan
- Wayne Mulligan
- Kalel Mullings
- Don Mullins
- Eric Mullins
- Gerry Mullins
- Noah Mullins
- Jerry Mulready
- Andy Mulumba
- Vince Mulvey
- Chad Muma
- Tony Mumford
- Nick Mumley
- Konata Mumpfield
- Keith Mumphery
- Lloyd Mumphord
- Lloyd Mumphrey
- Mike Munchak
- Chuck Muncie
- George Munday
- Fred Mundee
- Johnny Mundt
- Ryan Mundy
- Marc Munford
- Thayer Munford
- Jock Mungavin
- Munger
- James Mungro
- Lyle Munn
- Captain Munnerlyn
- George Munns
- Anthony Muñoz
- Nelson Munsey
- Bill Munson
- Calvin Munson
- Daniel Munyer
- Art Murakowski
- Ed Muransky
- Larrell Murchison
- Lee Murchison
- Guy Murdock
- Jesse Murdock
- Les Murdock
- Dick Murley
- Bill Murphy (born 1914)
- Bill Murphy (born 1946)
- Byron Murphy
- Byron Murphy II
- Caleb Murphy
- Dennis Murphy
- Frank Murphy
- Fred Murphy
- Gabriel Murphy
- George Murphy
- Harvey Murphy
- James Murphy
- Jerome Murphy
- Jim Murphy
- Joe Murphy
- Kevin Murphy
- Kyle Murphy
- Louis Murphy
- Marcus Murphy
- Mark Murphy (born 1955)
- Mark Murphy (born 1958)
- Matt Murphy
- Mike Murphy
- Montez Murphy
- Myles Murphy
- Nick Murphy
- Pace Murphy
- Phil Murphy
- Richard Murphy
- Rob Murphy
- Ryan Murphy
- Shawn Murphy
- Terrence Murphy
- Tom Murphy (born 1901)
- Tom Murphy (born 1909)
- Tommy Murphy
- Trent Murphy
- Tyler Murphy
- Yo Murphy
- Sean Murphy-Bunting
- William Murrah
- Bill Murray
- Calvin Murray
- Dan Murray
- DeMarco Murray
- Earl Murray
- Eddie Murray
- Eric Murray
- Franny Murray
- Jab Murray
- Jimmy Murray
- Jock Murray
- Joe Murray
- Justin Murray
- Kenneth Murray
- Kyler Murray
- Latavius Murray
- Mark Murray
- Patrick Murray
- Rico Murray
- Walter Murray
- Adrian Murrell
- Bill Murrell
- Marques Murrell
- Don Murry
- Mickey Murtagh
- Greg Murtha
- Lydon Murtha
- Ted Murtha
- Nick Muse
- Tanner Muse
- Bill Musgrave
- Luke Musgrave
- Spain Musgrove
- Jim Musick
- Neal Musser
- George Musso
- Johnny Musso
- Najee Mustafaa
- Malik Mustapha
- Chad Mustard
- Brad Muster
- PJ Mustipher
- Sam Mustipher
- Netane Muti
- Chet Mutryn
- Jim Mutscheller
- Chris Myarick
- Steve Myer
- Bob Myers
- Bobby Myers
- Brad Myers
- Brandon Myers
- Chip Myers
- Chris Myers
- Dave Myers
- Denny Myers
- Frank Myers
- Greg Myers
- Jack Myers
- Jason Myers
- Josh Myers
- Leonard Myers
- Michael Myers
- Rob Myers
- Ryan Myers
- Tom Myers (born 1943)
- Tom Myers (born 1950)
- Tommy Myers
- Truck Myers
- Wilbur Myers
- Steve Myhra
- DeShone Myles
- Godfrey Myles
- Harry Myles
- Jesse Myles
- Reggie Myles
- Toby Myles
- Alexander Myres
- Jalen Myrick
- Chip Myrtle
- Tom Myslinski
