= Kenneth Bowen =

Kenneth Bowen may refer to:

- Ken Bowen (1962–2021), American football player
- Kenneth Bowen (tenor) (1932–2018), Welsh operatic and concert singer
- Kenneth Bowen, New Orleans, Louisiana, police officer convicted in the 2005 Danziger Bridge shootings
- Kenny Bowen (1926–2002), mayor of Lafayette, Louisiana; Louisiana Political Museum and Hall of Fame inductee
