= Charles Huff =

Charles Huff may refer to:

- Brad Huff (Charles Bradley Huff, born 1979), American cyclist
- Charles Huff (American football coach) (born 1983), American football coach
- Charles Huff (defensive back) (born 1963), American football cornerback
