= UCHS =

UCHS can mean one of the following:

- Union City High School (New Jersey), a grades 10 - 12 high school in Union City, New Jersey
- Union City High School (Tennessee) in Union City, Tennessee
- University City High School (Missouri)
- University City High School (Philadelphia)
- University City High School (San Diego)
