= Antoine Cason =

American football player (born 1986)

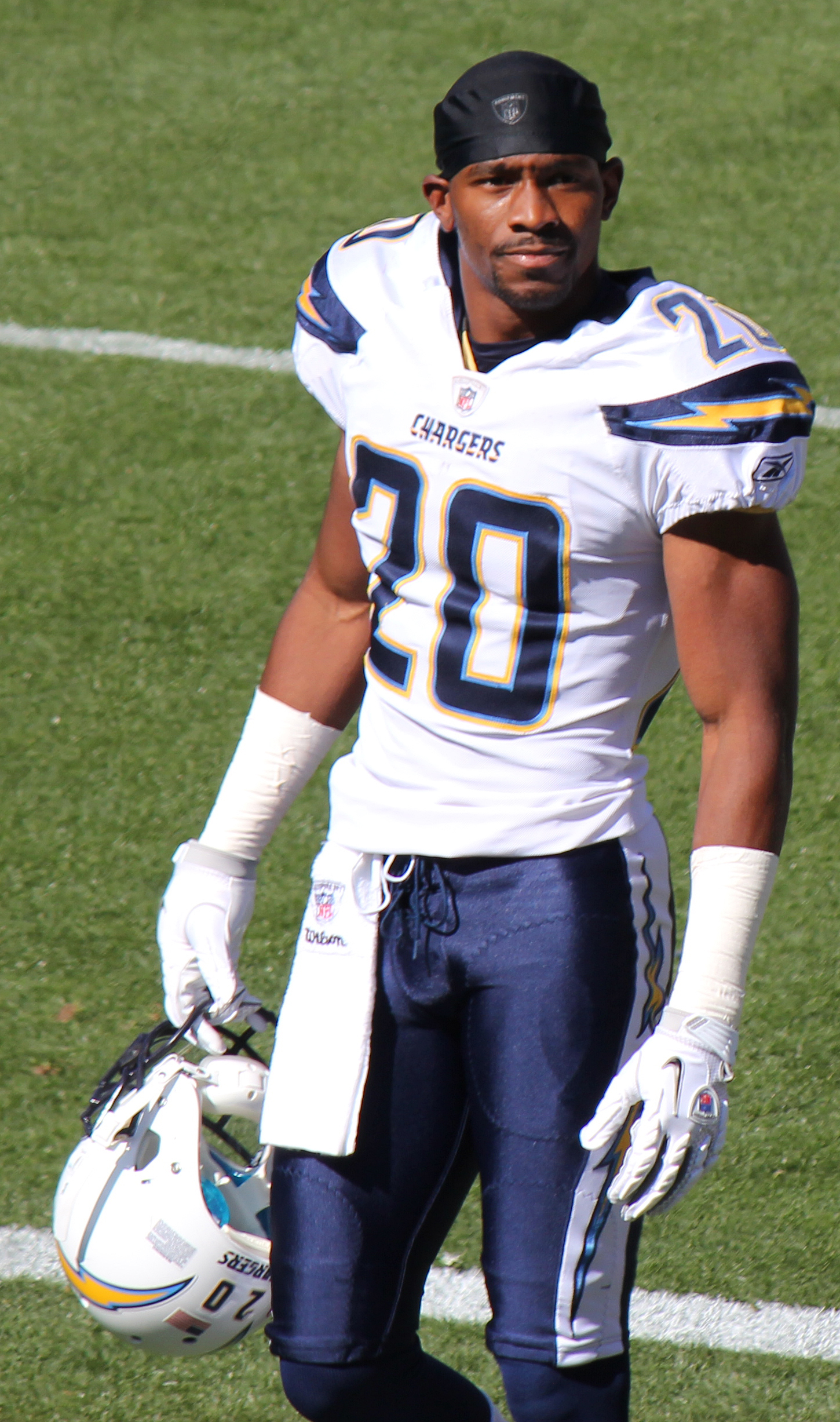
- Cason with the San Diego Chargers in 2011

No. 20, 23
- Position: Cornerback

Personal information
- Born: July 9, 1986 (age 40); Long Beach, California, U.S.
- Listed height: 6 ft 1 in (1.85 m)
- Listed weight: 195 lb (88 kg)

Career information
- High school: Los Alamitos (Los Alamitos, California)
- College: Arizona (2004–2007)
- NFL draft: 2008: 1st round, 27th overall pick

Career history
- San Diego Chargers (2008–2012); Arizona Cardinals (2013); Carolina Panthers (2014); Baltimore Ravens (2014)

Awards and highlights
- Consensus All-American (2007); 2× First-team All-Pac-10 (2006, 2007); Second-team All-Pac-10 (2005); Thorpe Award (2007); Arizona Wildcats Jersey No. 5 retired

Career NFL statistics
- Total tackles: 380
- Forced fumbles: 8
- Fumble recoveries: 3
- Pass deflections: 64
- Interceptions: 16
- Defensive touchdowns: 2
- Stats at Pro Football Reference

Antoine Brandon Cason (born July 9, 1986) is an American former professional football player who was a cornerback in the National Football League (NFL). He played college football for the Arizona Wildcats where he was recognized as a consensus All-American and won the Jim Thorpe Award. He was selected by the San Diego Chargers in the first round of the 2008 NFL draft. Cason also played for Arizona Cardinals, Carolina Panthers, and Baltimore Ravens.

== Early life ==
Cason was born and raised in Long Beach, California, to Deborah and Wendell Cason. His father Wendell played football for the University of Oregon and the NFL's Atlanta Falcons. His brother Dione competed in track at Washington State University.

He got his start playing in a local football league for the Carson-Gardena Colts, where he stood out as one of the team's top players. Cason started his high school career at Long Beach Polytechnic High School, then transferred to Los Alamitos High School in Los Alamitos, California after his freshman year. At Los Al, he played defensive back for the school's football team and ran track.

Considered a three-star recruit by Rivals.com, Cason was listed as the No. 37 cornerback prospect in the nation in 2004. He chose Arizona over offers from Oregon State and Washington.

== College career ==
Cason attended the University of Arizona, where he majored in political science and played for the Arizona Wildcats football team from 2004 to 2007. He was a starting player for the University's football team since his freshman year in 2004, and is recognized as one of the best cornerbacks in Arizona's history. After his first collegiate game, Antoine was named the Pac-10 Defensive Player of the week. During his freshmen year, he was also honored as the Pac-10 Freshman of the Year. In 2005, he earned Second-team All-Pac-10 honors. Following the Wildcats' upset win against number 25-ranked Washington State University on November 4, 2006, he earned his second Pac-10 Defensive Player of the week award. The following week, he was recognized again as Pac-10 Defensive Player of the Week after breaking a 17-17 tie between the Wildcats and the number 8-ranked Cal Bears by scoring a touchdown on a 39-yard interception return. In 2006, Cason was a semi-finalist for the Jim Thorpe Award. After the 2006 season, Cason was eligible for the 2007 NFL draft. However, he decided to return for his senior season to finish his college degree.

Cason continued his stellar play into his 2007 senior season. His performance on November 15, 2007 in a 34-24 win against the then number two ranked Oregon Ducks included both an interception return and punt return for touchdowns. He finished the season with 5 interceptions, 2 of which were returned for touchdowns. He also returned 2 punts for touchdowns. On December 6, 2007, he was awarded the Jim Thorpe Award for best defensive back in the country and was a consensus first-team All-America choice.

Cason also competed in track & field for the Wildcats from 2006 to 2007. In the spring of 2007, Cason earned All-American honors in Track and Field for his contribution to the Wildcats Men's 4 × 100 metres relay team, which finished in the top eight at the NCAA Championship.

== Professional career ==
=== Pre-draft ===
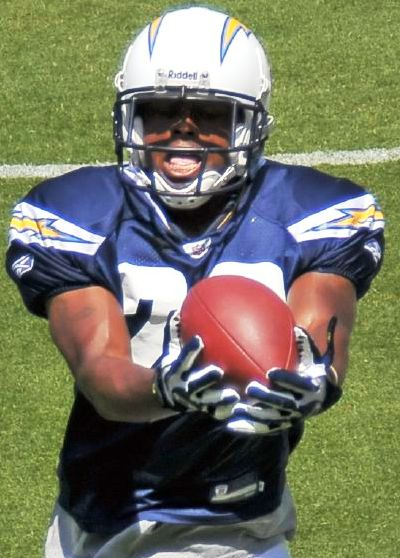
Cason in 2008

Cason was regarded as one of the best cornerbacks available in the 2008 NFL draft, and was projected a mid-to-late first round pick by Sports Illustrated.

Pre-draft measurables
Height	Weight	40-yard dash	10-yard split	20-yard split	20-yard shuttle	Three-cone drill	Vertical jump	Broad jump	Bench press
6 ft 0 1/4 in (1.84 m)	191 lb (87 kg)	4.45 s	1.51 s	2.53 s	4.08 s	DNP s	35 1/2 in (0.90 m)	10 ft 8 in (3.25 m)	20 reps
All values from NFL Combine. Did not participate in 3-cone due to tight hamstring

=== San Diego Chargers ===
==== 2008 season ====
Cason was selected in the first round (27th overall) by the San Diego Chargers. He signed a five year, $12.03 million deal with the team.

Cason played in all 16 regular season games and both playoff games at cornerback and on special teams as a rookie for the 2008 AFC Western Division champion San Diego Chargers. His first career NFL interception came on September 14, against the Denver Broncos, picking off Jay Cutler in the end zone and returning it for 10 yards. His second interception was off Tampa Bay's Jeff Garcia, which he returned 59 yards for his first career NFL touchdown. He ended his rookie season with 74 tackles (59 solo) and 2 INTs.

==== 2009 season ====
The Chargers first game of the season came on a Monday Night Football match up against rival Oakland Raiders. In that game, Cason intercepted JaMarcus Russell's hail mary attempt on the last play of the game to seal the victory for the Chargers. In the next game, he intercepted Baltimore Ravens Joe Flacco and returned it 22 yards. Cason ended the season with 41 total tackles (38 solo) and 2 INTs. He played in all 16 regular season games and their only playoff game for the 2009 AFC Western Division champion San Diego Chargers.

==== 2010 season ====
He made his first career NFL start at cornerback on Monday Night Football against the Kansas City Chiefs in Week 1. Cason had 2 interceptions against David Garrard of the Jacksonville Jaguars in Week 2. He finished the season with 67 tackles (57 solo) and 4 INTs while playing all 16 regular season games.

==== 2011 season ====
Cason was the starting cornerback opposite Quentin Jammer to begin the season. Following a game against the New York Jets, in which he allowed three touchdown passes to Plaxico Burress, he was briefly benched in favor of the Chargers rookie cornerback Marcus Gilchrist. He regained the starting job after Gilchrist made one start. He sealed the Chargers victory in Week 17 against the Oakland Raiders with an interception off Carson Palmer, which ended the Raiders playoff chances.

==== 2012 season ====
Cason started all 16 regular season games for the Chargers. He ended the season with 73 total tackles (62 solo) and 2 INTs.

=== Arizona Cardinals ===
On March 15, 2013, Cason signed a one-year deal with the Arizona Cardinals. Even though the Jacksonville Jaguars offered him a larger contract, he decided to return to the state where he was a college standout. In a game against the Tennessee Titans, Cason had 2 interceptions, one of them he ran back for a touchdown. Despite playing in all 16 regular season games, his season was considered a disappointment. He finished with only 14 total tackles (12 solo) and 2 INTs.

=== Carolina Panthers ===
On March 21, 2014, Cason signed a one-year deal with the Carolina Panthers for $795,000, with $65,000 guaranteed. During his debut performance for the Panthers in a 20-14 victory against the Tampa Bay Buccaneers, Cason recorded 9 tackles, 2 pass deflections, and an interception. During the week 2 victory over the Detroit Lions, Cason recorded 10 tackles, 2 forced fumbles, and 1 fumble recovery. In the Panthers week 5 victory over the Chicago Bears, Cason recorded 6 tackles, 1 pass deflection, and had pivotal forced fumble against Matt Forte in the fourth quarter that led to the game-winning touchdown. Through five games with the Panthers, Cason had set a career-high with 3 forced fumbles.

Despite this early success, Cason began to struggle to produce later on in the season. In a week 9 loss to the New Orleans Saints, Cason was benched after he was called for a 32-yard pass interference penalty. In week 13, Cason was benched again after allowing a 17-yard touchdown pass to Greg Jennings of the Minnesota Vikings, which contributed to Carolina's 31-13 loss. Two days later, on December 2, he was waived from his contract. He had started 11 of 12 games during his season with Carolina.

=== Baltimore Ravens ===
Cason signed with the Baltimore Ravens on December 9, 2014. He decided to wear #23, instead of his usual #20, as a mark of respect to the great Ed Reed, who famously wore #20 for Baltimore. He played the last two regular season games and became a free agent at the end of the season.

On June 24, 2015, he announced he would miss the upcoming season due to a surgery he had on his right foot.

== Career statistics ==
=== NFL ===
Year	Team	GP	COMB	TOTAL	AST	SACK	FF	FR	FR YDS	INT	IR YDS	AVG IR	LNG	TD	PD
2008	SD	16	74	59	15	0.0	1	0	0	2	69	35	59	1	7
2009	SD	16	41	38	3	0.0	0	0	0	2	22	11	22	0	3
2010	SD	16	67	57	10	0.0	1	0	0	4	51	13	28	0	17
2011	SD	16	53	46	7	0.0	0	0	0	2	69	35	64	0	17
2012	SD	16	73	62	11	0.0	2	0	0	2	34	17	31	0	11
2013	ARI	16	14	12	2	0.0	0	2	43	2	36	18	20	1	3
2014	CAR	12	58	44	14	0.0	4	1	0	2	81	41	80	0	6
2014	BAL	2	0	0	0	0.0	0	0	0	0	0	0	0	0	0
Career		110	380	318	62	0.0	8	3	0	16	362	23	80	2	64

=== College ===
Year	GP	Solo	Ast	Total	TFL	Yds	No	Yds	Int	Yds	TD	BrUp	RCV	Yds	FF	Attempt	Yds	TD
2007	12	56	15	71	4	12	1	6	5	164	2	14	0	0	2	27	271	2
2006	12	48	14	62	2	8	0	0	3	57	1	7	1	0	1	0	0	0
2005	11	38	12	50	2.5	5	0	0	3	40	0	5	0	0	0	0	0	0
2004	11	54	16	70	5.5	18	0	0	4	88	0	6	0	0	3	0	0	0
Total	46	196	57	253	14	43	1	6	15	349	3	32	1	0	6	27	271	2

== Career highlights ==
College

- Honorable mention Sporting News All-Pac-10 (2004)
- Sporting News Pac-10 Freshman of the Year (2004)
- Sporting News Freshman All-American (2004)
- FWAA Freshman All-American (2004)
- Rivals.com Freshman All-America Club (2004)
- Second-team All-Pac-10 (2005)
- 2× First-team All-Pac-10 (2006-2007)
- Jim Thorpe Award semifinalist (2006)
- NCAA Division I Outdoor Track and Field All American in 4x100 (2006)
- Jim Thorpe Award (2007)
- Walter Camp First-team All American (2007)
- Associated Press First-team All American (2007)
- The Sporting News First-team All American (2007)
- CBSSports.com First-team All American (2007)
- SI.com First-team All American (2007)
- Rivals.com First-team All American (2007)
- University of Arizona Athletics Hall of Fame (2019)

== Post-playing career ==
Following his professional playing career, Cason has pursued becoming an on-field official, initially working high school games. He was assigned as an alternate official for the January 2023 edition of the NFLPA Collegiate Bowl.
