= Ralph Van Dyke =

American football player (born 1964)

No. 71
- Position: Offensive tackle

Personal information
- Born: January 19, 1964 (age 62); Chicago Heights, Illinois, U.S.
- Listed height: 6 ft 6 in (1.98 m)
- Listed weight: 273 lb (124 kg)

Career information
- High school: Bloom (Chicago Heights)
- College: Southern Illinois
- NFL draft: 1987: 4th round, 97th overall pick

Career history
- Atlanta Falcons (1987)*; Cleveland Browns (1987); Phoenix Cardinals (1988)*
- * Offseason or practice squad member only

Career NFL statistics
- Games played: 2
- Games started: 2
- Stats at Pro Football Reference

Ralph Waldo Van Dyke III (born January 19, 1964) is an American former professional football player who was an offensive lineman for the Cleveland Browns of the National Football League (NFL). He played college football for the Southern Illinois Salukis.

== Early life ==
Ralph Waldo Van Dyke III was born on January 19, 1964, at St. James Hospital in Chicago Heights, Illinois, to Ralph Waldo Van Dyke, Jr. and Mattie Lou Van Dyke.

In addition to playing high school football, Van Dyke played basketball at Bloom High School in Chicago Heights.

== College football ==
Van Dyke was a redshirt during his freshman year at Southern Illinois in 1982. He became a starter for the team by the fifth game of the 1983 season, and was noted as an "extremely aggressive" hard worker by coach Rod Sherrill in 1983, shortly before the Salukis won the NCAA Division I-AA championship.

In 1986, he made the all-Missouri Valley Conference first-team offense as an offensive tackle, and was an honorable mention on the Associated Press all-American list.

== Professional football ==
=== Atlanta Falcons ===
After a below-average performance at the NFL Scouting Combine, Van Dyke was selected by the Atlanta Falcons in the fourth round of the 1987 NFL draft, with the 97th pick overall. He signed with the team in late July 1987, but was waived roughly a month later on August 31.

=== Cleveland Browns ===
During the 1987 NFL strike, Van Dyke signed with the Cleveland Browns as a replacement player, starting at offensive tackle in the team's Week 4 and Week 5 games. The strike ended after Week 6 and Van Dyke was released by the Browns.

=== Phoenix Cardinals ===
Van Dyke signed with the Phoenix Cardinals on March 31, 1988, in the midst of the team's relocation from St. Louis, Missouri to Phoenix, Arizona. He suffered a sprain to his knee in July 1988 during the team's training camp in Flagstaff, requiring him to be sent south to Phoenix for treatment. He left the team's camp on July 28, 1988.
