= Union City High School (Tennessee) =

Location
- 1305 High School Drive; Union City, Obion County, Tennessee 38261; United States
- Coordinates: 36.4183487°N 89.0428928°W

Information
- Type: Public high school
- School district: Union City School District
- NCES School ID: 4704260
- Principal: Jacob Cross
- Faculty: 30.00 FTEs
- Grades: 9-12
- Enrollment: 417 (as of 2023–2024)
- Student to teacher ratio: 13.90
- Colors: Purple and gold
- Team name: Golden Tornadoes
- Website: www.tornadotouch.net/apps/pages/index.jsp?uREC_ID=268712&type=d

Union City High School is a comprehensive public high school in Union City, in Obion County, Tennessee, Tennessee, United States, operating as the lone secondary school of the Union City School District.

As of the 2018–19 school year, the school had an enrollment of 450 students and 34.7 classroom teachers (on an FTE basis), for a student–teacher ratio of 13.0:1.

== Notable alumni ==
- Jovante Moffatt (born 1996), American football safety for the Cleveland Browns of the National Football League.
- Stephen Vaden (born 1982, class of 2000), Judge of the United States Court of International Trade.
