= Geno Zimmerlink =

American football player (born 1963)

No. 46
- Position: Tight end

Personal information
- Born: March 26, 1963 (age 63); Milltown, New Jersey, U.S.
- Listed height: 6 ft 3 in (1.91 m)
- Listed weight: 222 lb (101 kg)

Career information
- High school: Spotswood
- College: Virginia
- NFL draft: 1986: undrafted

Career history
- Indianapolis Colts (1986)*; Atlanta Falcons (1987)
- * Offseason or practice squad member only
- Stats at Pro Football Reference

Eugene Franklin Zimmerlink Jr. (born March 26, 1963) is an American former professional football player who was a tight end for the Atlanta Falcons of the National Football League (NFL). He played college football for the Virginia Cavaliers.
