= Ken Mitchell (American football) =

American football player (born 1948)

No. 52
- Position: Linebacker

Personal information
- Born: November 14, 1948 (age 77); Denio, Nevada, U.S.
- Listed height: 6 ft 2 in (1.88 m)
- Listed weight: 224 lb (102 kg)

Career information
- High school: South Bay Lutheran (Inglewood, California)
- College: UNLV
- NFL draft: 1972: undrafted

Career history
- Atlanta Falcons (1972–1974)
- Stats at Pro Football Reference

Kenneth Wayne Mitchell (born November 14, 1948) is an American former professional football linebacker who played for the Atlanta Falcons of the National Football League (NFL). He played college football for the UNLV Rebels.

== Early life ==
Kenneth Wayne Mitchell was born on November 14, 1948, in Denio, Nevada. He was a basketball and baseball "star" at South Bay Lutheran High School in Inglewood, California. His parents did not let him play football until his senior year, during which he suffered a knee injury requiring surgery.

== College career ==
Mitchell accepted an athletic scholarship to play college baseball and basketball at Nevada Southern University (later University of Nevada, Las Vegas). He joined the UNLV Rebels football team in 1970 and was a two-year varsity letterman. He was initially an offensive guard but was moved to linebacker after he kept going offsides. Mitchell missed playing time in 1970 due to a dislocated shoulder. He recorded a then-school record 11 sacks in 1971. However, Mitchell, anticipating being drafted into the United States Army due to poor grades, decided to enlist with the United States Marine Corps during the Vietnam War. A few hours before he was about to leave for Vietnam, Mitchell's shoulder popped out of place during a pickup basketball game. He was then medically discharged from the Marines. He was inducted into the UNLV Athletics Hall Of Fame in 1989 for his football career.

== Professional career ==
In 1972, Mitchell called every NFL team and asked for a tryout. He reportedly called the Falcons every day, believing they needed linebacking help. The team's director of player personnel, Tom Braatz, answered one day, stating "we don’t think you can play a lick of football, but, man, you are persistent. So here’s the deal. You get one shot at this thing. And then when we cut you, you have to sign an agreement saying you’ll never call us again." Mitchell signed with the Falcons despite playing in "less than ten" football games his entire life. He spent the 1972 season on the Falcons' taxi squad. He had offseason knee surgery in 1973. Falcons general manager Norm Van Brocklin said Mitchell was a "savage hitter". He played in all 28 regular season games for the Falcons from 1973 to 1974 in a reserve role, recording two fumble recoveries and four kick returns for 36 yards.

== Personal life ==
Seven of Mitchell's eight children played college sports. His son, Mickey Mitchell, played college basketball for the Ohio State Buckeyes and Arizona State Sun Devils.
