= Struggy Smith =

American football player (born 1964)

No. 20
- Position: Cornerback

Personal information
- Born: February 13, 1964 (age 62); Charlotte, North Carolina, U.S.
- Listed height: 6 ft 2 in (1.88 m)
- Listed weight: 190 lb (86 kg)

Career information
- High school: West Charlotte
- College: Appalachian State
- NFL draft: 1986: undrafted

Career history
- St. Louis Cardinals (1987)*; Atlanta Falcons (1987)
- * Offseason or practice squad member only
- Stats at Pro Football Reference

Henri F. "Struggy" Smith (born February 13, 1964) is an American former professional football cornerback who played for the Atlanta Falcons of the National Football League (NFL). He played college football for the Appalachian State Mountaineers.

== Early life ==
Henri F. Smith was born on February 13, 1964, in Charlotte, North Carolina. He attended West Charlotte High School.

== College career ==
Smith enrolled at Appalachian State University to play college football for the Mountaineers. He played for them from 1982 to 1985 and earned All-Southern Conference twice. He garnered Associated Press Division I-AA honorable mention All-American honors as a senior in 1985. Smith's 15 career interceptions tied the school record. He majored in criminal justice at Appalachian State and graduated in August 1986.

== Professional career ==
Smith had a tryout with the Winnipeg Blue Bombers of the Canadian Football League in 1986 but was not signed. He signed with the St. Louis Cardinals in 1987 but was released before the regular season.

On September 23, 1987, Smith signed with the Atlanta Falcons during the 1987 NFL players strike. He played in two of three strike games on special teams and as a reserve cornerback. He was released on October 19, 1987, after the strike ended. After Smith's release, he returned to his job as a deputy sheriff/jailer in Mecklenburg County, North Carolina.
