= Jim Hendley =

American football player (born 1964)

No. 53
- Position: Center

Personal information
- Born: October 25, 1964 (age 62); Valdosta, Georgia, U.S.
- Listed height: 6 ft 3 in (1.91 m)
- Listed weight: 257 lb (117 kg)

Career information
- High school: Berrien
- College: Florida State
- NFL draft: 1987: undrafted

Career history
- Dallas Cowboys (1987)*; Atlanta Falcons (1987)
- * Offseason or practice squad member only
- Stats at Pro Football Reference

James Willis Hendley Jr. (born October 25, 1964) is an American former professional football player who was a center for the Atlanta Falcons of the National Football League (NFL). He played college football for the Florida State Seminoles.
