= Sylvester Byrd =

American football player (born 1963)

No. 88
- Position: Tight end

Personal information
- Born: May 1, 1963 (age 63); Kansas City, Kansas, U.S.
- Listed height: 6 ft 2 in (1.88 m)
- Listed weight: 225 lb (102 kg)

Career information
- High school: Bishop Ward (Kansas City)
- College: Kansas
- NFL draft: 1986: undrafted

Career history
- Chicago Bears (1986)*; Green Bay Packers (1987)*; Atlanta Falcons (1987)
- * Offseason or practice squad member only
- Stats at Pro Football Reference

Sylvester Carl Byrd (born May 1, 1963) is an American former professional football player who was a tight end for the Atlanta Falcons of the National Football League (NFL). He played college football for the Kansas Jayhawks.
