= Jerome Norris =

American football player (born 1964)

No. 26
- Position: Safety

Personal information
- Born: January 31, 1964 (age 62)
- Listed height: 6 ft 0 in (1.83 m)
- Listed weight: 187 lb (85 kg)

Career information
- High school: Crescent
- College: Furman
- NFL draft: 1987: undrafted

Career history
- Atlanta Falcons (1987)
- Stats at Pro Football Reference

Jerome Norris (born January 31, 1964) is an American former professional football safety who played for the Atlanta Falcons of the National Football League (NFL). He played college football at Furman University.
