= Kwante Hampton =

American football player (born 1963)

No. 85
- Position: Wide receiver

Personal information
- Born: December 11, 1963 (age 62); Los Angeles, California, U.S.
- Listed height: 6 ft 1 in (1.85 m)
- Listed weight: 181 lb (82 kg)

Career information
- High school: Van Nuys (CA)
- College: Oregon; Long Beach State
- NFL draft: 1987: undrafted

Career history
- Los Angeles Rams (1987)*; Atlanta Falcons (1987); New York Jets (1988)*
- * Offseason or practice squad member only

Career NFL statistics
- Games played: 1
- Stats at Pro Football Reference

Kwante Lavon Hampton (born December 11, 1963) is an American former professional football player who was a wide receiver for one season with the Atlanta Falcons of the National Football League (NFL). He played college football for the Oregon Ducks and Long Beach State 49ers, and was signed by the Los Angeles Rams as an undrafted free agent in 1987. Hampton also spent time with the New York Jets.

== Early life and education ==
Hampton was born on December 11, 1963, in Los Angeles, California. He attended Van Nuys High School, recording 58 receptions for 987 yards and 13 touchdowns in 1980, (Note: The Los Angeles Times in 1981 reported 57 catches for 976 yards and 12 touchdowns, while a year later it reported 58 for 987 yards and 13 scores.) and earning second-team all-valley honors by The Los Angeles Times. His coach said, "He will catch anything that touches his hands." Hampton committed to the University of Oregon in 1982, joining former Van Nuys teammate Mike Owens. He earned varsity letters in his first two years with the team, before transferring to Long Beach State University in 1984. He graduated following the 1986 season.

== Professional career ==
After going unselected in the 1987 NFL draft, Hampton was signed by the Los Angeles Rams as an undrafted free agent. He was released at the final roster cuts in September.

Hampton was signed by the Atlanta Falcons later in the season, as a replacement player during the Players Association strike. He appeared in one game with the team before being released.

Hampton was signed by the New York Jets in May 1988, but did not make their final roster.
