= Tim Gordon =

American football player (born 1965)

No. 41
- Position: Safety

Personal information
- Born: May 7, 1965 (age 61); Ardmore, Oklahoma, U.S.
- Listed height: 6 ft 0 in (1.83 m)
- Listed weight: 188 lb (85 kg)

Career information
- High school: Ardmore (OK)
- College: Tulsa
- NFL draft: 1987: undrafted

Career history
- Atlanta Falcons (1987–1990); New England Patriots (1990-1992)

Career NFL statistics
- Interceptions: 8
- Fumble recoveries: 4
- Sacks: 1
- Stats at Pro Football Reference

Timothy Carvelle Gordon (born May 7, 1965) is an American former professional football player who played safety for six seasons in the National Football League (NFL). He played for the Atlanta Falcons from 1987 to 1990 and for the New England Patriots in 1991 and 1992.
