= Nate Miller (offensive lineman) =

American football player (born 1971)

No. 55, 78
- Position: Offensive guard

Personal information
- Born: October 8, 1971 (age 55); Tuscaloosa, Alabama, U.S.
- Listed height: 6 ft 3 in (1.91 m)
- Listed weight: 310 lb (141 kg)

Career information
- High school: Tuscaloosa (AL) Central
- College: LSU

Career history
- Atlanta Falcons (1995–1998); Frankfurt Galaxy (1997); New York Giants (1998); Los Angeles Xtreme (2001)
- Stats at Pro Football Reference

Nathan Udell Miller (born October 8, 1971) is an American former professional football offensive guard who played three seasons with the Atlanta Falcons and one season with the New York Giants of the National Football League (NFL). He played college football at Louisiana State University. He was also a member of the Frankfurt Galaxy, New York Giants and Los Angeles Xtreme.

== Early life ==
Miller attended Central High School in Tuscaloosa, Alabama.

== College career ==
Miller played four years for the LSU Tigers, starting 29 of 37 games. He recorded 101 tackles, two forced fumbles, 11 tackles for loss, and two sacks in his college career.

== Professional career ==
Miller was a member of the NFL's Atlanta Falcons from 1995 to 1998. He played in 13 games for the Falcons in 1997. He played for the Frankfurt Galaxy of the World League of American Football during the 1997 season. Miller was a member of the New York Giants of the NFL from 1998 to 1999. He was released by the Giants prior to the start of the 1999 season. He played for the Los Angeles Xtreme of the XFL in 2001.
