= Doug Mackie =

American football player (born 1957)

No. 73
- Position: Tackle

Personal information
- Born: February 18, 1957; Malden, Massachusetts
- Listed height: 6 ft 4 in (1.93 m)
- Listed weight: 280 lb (127 kg)

Career information
- College: Ohio State
- NFL draft: 1980: undrafted

Career history
- New York Giants (1982)*; Tampa Bay Bandits (1983); New Jersey Generals (1984–1985); New Orleans Saints (1986)*; Atlanta Falcons (1987)
- * Offseason or practice squad member only

Career NFL statistics
- Games played: 3
- Stats at Pro Football Reference

Douglas Mackie (born February 18, 1957, in Malden, Massachusetts) is a former offensive tackle who played for the Atlanta Falcons of the National Football League and the Tampa Bay Bandits and New Jersey Generals of the United States Football League. Selected as a 1984 College & Pro Football Newsweekly 2nd Team All-Pro along with running back Herschel Walker. Part of starting offensive line who helped Herschel Walker set the still standing, single-season, pro football rushing record of 2,411 yards.

He was also a member of the New York Giants and New Orleans Saints, but did not appear in any games for either team. He played college football for the Ohio State Buckeyes, but injuries caused him to miss all of his junior and senior seasons.
