= John Kamana =

American football player (born 1961)

No. 46, 47
- Position: Running back

Personal information
- Born: December 3, 1961 (age 64); Honolulu, Hawaii, U.S.
- Listed height: 6 ft 2 in (1.88 m)
- Listed weight: 230 lb (104 kg)

Career information
- High school: Punahou (Honolulu)
- College: USC
- NFL draft: 1984: undrafted

Career history
- Los Angeles Rams (1984); Atlanta Falcons (1987)
- Stats at Pro Football Reference

John Kamana (born December 3, 1961) is an American former professional football player who was a running back in the National Football League (NFL). He played college football for the USC Trojans. He played in the NFL for the Los Angeles Rams in 1984 and Atlanta Falcons in 1987.
