= Johnny Taylor (American football) =

American football player (born 1961)

No. 96, 54, 55
- Position: Linebacker

Personal information
- Born: June 21, 1961 (age 65); Seattle, Washington, U.S.
- Listed height: 6 ft 4 in (1.93 m)
- Listed weight: 237 lb (108 kg)

Career information
- High school: Garfield (Seattle)
- College: Hawaii
- NFL draft: 1984: undrafted

Career history
- Atlanta Falcons (1984–1986); Miami Dolphins (1986); San Diego Chargers (1987)
- Stats at Pro Football Reference

Johnny Herbert Taylor (born June 21, 1961) is an American former professional football linebacker who played in the National Football League (NFL) with the Atlanta Falcons, Miami Dolphins, and San Diego Chargers. He played college football for the Hawaii Rainbow Warriors.

== Early life ==
Johnny Herbert Taylor was born on June 21, 1961, in Seattle, Washington. He attended Garfield High School in Seattle.

== College career ==
Taylor played junior college football at Wenatchee Valley College from 1980 to 1981. He transferred to the University of Hawaiʻi at Mānoa, where he was a two-year letterman for the Rainbow Warriors from 1982 to 1983.

== Professional career ==
After going undrafted in the 1984 NFL draft, Taylor signed with the Atlanta Falcons on May 2, 1984. He had a strong performance at rookie minicamp. He was injured for most of training camp, and was released on August 21. Taylor re-signed with Atlanta on December 6, 1984. He played in 22 games, starting seven, for the Falcons from 1984 to 1986, posting one sack, two forced fumbles, and one fumble recovery. Taylor was waived on October 11, 1986.

Taylor was claimed off waivers by the Miami Dolphins on October 13, 1986. He played in one game for the Dolphins on special teams, during which he suffered an ankle injury. He was placed on injured reserve on October 23. He was released on November 28, 1986.

On September 24, 1987, Taylor signed with the San Diego Chargers during the 1987 NFL players strike. He stayed on with the team after the strike ended. He appeared in seven games, starting three, overall for the Chargers during the 1987 season before being placed on injured reserve on December 12, 1987. Taylor was released on August 22, 1988.
