= Jovante Moffatt =

American football player (born 1996)

Jo'Vante Moffatt
No. 35, 20
- Position: Safety

Personal information
- Born: December 25, 1996 (age 29); Union City, Tennessee, U.S.
- Listed height: 5 ft 11 in (1.80 m)
- Listed weight: 213 lb (97 kg)

Career information
- High school: Union City
- College: Middle Tennessee (2015–2019)
- NFL draft: 2020: undrafted

Career history
- Cleveland Browns (2020–2021); New York Jets (2022)*; Cleveland Browns (2022)*; Atlanta Falcons (2022); Arizona Cardinals (2023)*
- * Offseason or practice squad member only

Career NFL statistics
- Total tackles: 10
- Stats at Pro Football Reference

Jo'Vante Moffatt (born December 25, 1996) is an American former professional football player who was a safety in the National Football League (NFL). He played college football for the Middle Tennessee Blue Raiders.

== Early life and college ==
Moffatt's high school football team, the Union City Golden Tornadoes, won consecutive Class 1A Tennessee state championships in his junior and senior seasons (2013 and 2014). In college, Moffatt was a member of the Middle Tennessee Blue Raiders for five seasons. He had 36 tackles with an interception, five passes broken and a forced fumble in his senior season before suffering shoulder injury and using a medical redshirt. As a redshirt senior, Moffat led the Blue Raiders with 98 tackles and three interceptions and was named honorable mention All-Conference USA. Moffatt finished his collegiate career with 313 tackles, 5.5 tackles for loss, 17 passes defended and five interceptions.

== Professional career ==
Pre-draft measurables
Height	Weight	Arm length	Hand span
5 ft 11 1/4 in (1.81 m)	213 lb (97 kg)	30 7/8 in (0.78 m)	9 1/8 in (0.23 m)
All values from Pro Day

=== Cleveland Browns (first stint) ===
Moffatt was signed by the Cleveland Browns as an undrafted free agent following the 2020 NFL draft on April 25, 2020. He was placed on the reserve/COVID-19 list by the team on July 26, 2020, and was activated nine days later. He was waived during final roster cuts on September 5, 2020, and was signed to the team's practice squad the next day. The Browns promoted Moffatt to their active roster on September 29, 2020. He was placed back on the COVID list on January 8, 2021, and activated the next day.

Moffatt was waived by the Browns on August 31, 2021. Moffatt was re-signed to the Browns' practice squad on September 1, 2021. The Browns elevated Moffatt to their active roster on October 9, 2021. He reverted to the Browns' practice squad on October 11, 2021. Moffatt was elevated to the active roster a second time on October 30, 2021; he reverted to the practice squad on November 1, 2021. Moffatt was elevated to the active roster again on December 11, 2021. Moffatt was elevated to the active roster once more as a COVID-19 replacement player on December 24, 2021.

=== New York Jets ===
On January 26, 2022, Moffatt signed a reserve/future contract with the New York Jets. He was waived on July 27, 2022.

=== Cleveland Browns (second stint) ===
On July 29, 2022, Moffatt was claimed off waivers by the Browns. Moffatt was waived by the Browns on August 29, 2022.

=== Atlanta Falcons ===
On September 19, 2022, Moffatt was signed to the Atlanta Falcons practice squad. He was promoted to the active roster on November 8. On December 31, Moffat was placed on season–ending injured reserve. He was waived on April 14, 2023.

=== Arizona Cardinals ===
On April 17, 2023, Moffatt was claimed off waivers by the Arizona Cardinals. He was waived on August 30, 2023 and re-signed to the practice squad. He was released on September 22.
