= Mark Studaway =

American football player (born 1960)

No. 98, 71, 78
- Position: Defensive end

Personal information
- Born: September 20, 1960 (age 66); Memphis, Tennessee, U.S.
- Listed height: 6 ft 3 in (1.91 m)
- Listed weight: 273 lb (124 kg)

Career information
- High school: South Side (Memphis)
- College: Tennessee
- NFL draft: 1984: 4th round, 85th overall pick

Career history
- Houston Oilers (1984); Tampa Bay Buccaneers (1985); Indianapolis Colts (1987)*; Atlanta Falcons (1987)
- * Offseason or practice squad member only

Career NFL statistics
- Sacks: 0.5
- Stats at Pro Football Reference

Mark Studaway (born September 20, 1960) is an American former professional football player who was a defensive end in the National Football League (NFL). He played college football for the Tennessee Volunteers. Studaway was selected by the Houston Oilers in the fourth round of the 1984 NFL draft. He played in the NFL for the Oilers in 1984, the Tampa Bay Buccaneers in 1985 and for the Atlanta Falcons in 1987. He played in 14 games over three seasons with the three teams. He registered a half-sack in the 1987 season with the Falcons.
