= Joe Costello (American football) =

American football player (born 1960)

No. 71, 99, 56
- Position: Defensive end

Personal information
- Born: June 1, 1960 (age 66); New York City, New York, U.S.
- Listed height: 6 ft 3 in (1.91 m)
- Listed weight: 245 lb (111 kg)

Career information
- High school: Stratford (Stratford, Connecticut)
- College: Central Connecticut State
- NFL draft: 1986: undrafted

Career history
- Montreal Concordes (1982); Jacksonville Bulls (1984-1985); Cleveland Browns (1986)*; Atlanta Falcons (1986–1988); Los Angeles Raiders (1989)
- * Offseason or practice squad member only

Career NFL statistics
- Sacks: 2
- Stats at Pro Football Reference

Joseph Patrick Costello (born June 1, 1960) is an American former professional football player who was a defensive end in the National Football League (NFL) for the Atlanta Falcons and Los Angeles Raiders from 1986 to 1989. He played college football for the Central Connecticut Blue Devils.
