= Lawrence Jackson (guard) =

American football player (born 1964)

No. 64
- Position: Guard

Personal information
- Born: August 10, 1964 (age 62); Jacksonville, Florida, U.S.
- Listed height: 6 ft 1 in (1.85 m)
- Listed weight: 275 lb (125 kg)

Career information
- High school: North Fulton (Atlanta, Georgia)
- College: Presbyterian
- NFL draft: 1986: undrafted

Career history
- New England Patriots (1986)*; Atlanta Falcons (1987)
- * Offseason or practice squad member only

Career NFL statistics
- Games played: 3
- Games started: 3
- Stats at Pro Football Reference

Lawrence Dennell Jackson (born August 10, 1964) is an American former professional football player who was a guard for the Atlanta Falcons of the National Football League (NFL). He played college football for the Presbyterian Blue Hose.
