= Darryl Oliver =

American football player (born 1964)

No. 45
- Position: Running back

Personal information
- Born: July 13, 1964 (age 62); Palatka, Florida, U.S.
- Listed height: 5 ft 10 in (1.78 m)
- Listed weight: 194 lb (88 kg)

Career information
- High school: Palatka
- College: Miami (1982–1986)
- NFL draft: 1987: 11th round, 297th overall pick

Career history
- Seattle Seahawks (1987)*; Tampa Bay Buccaneers (1987)*; Atlanta Falcons (1987); New York Jets (1988)*
- * Offseason or practice squad member only

Awards and highlights
- National champion (1983)

Career NFL statistics
- Games played: 2
- Receptions: 1
- Receiving yards: 2
- Return yards: 90
- Stats at Pro Football Reference

Darryl Hiram Oliver (born July 13, 1964) is an American former professional football running back who played for the Atlanta Falcons of the National Football League (NFL). He played college football for the Miami Hurricanes.

== Early life ==
Oliver was born on July 13, 1964, in Palatka, Florida. He attended Palatka High School in Palatka and was a third-team All-State recipient his senior year. Oliver rushed for 1,064 yards and 11 touchdowns before he committed to play college football at the University of Miami.

== College career ==
Oliver played college football for the Miami Hurricanes from 1982 to 1986. He was a four-year letterman from 1983 to 1986. Oliver played in 45 games, recording 882 rushing yards, five touchdowns, 49 receptions for 430 yards and 233 return yards. In his redshirt freshman year, he was a member of the team when Miami claimed the national championship.

== Professional career ==
Pre-draft measurables
Height	Weight	Arm length	Hand span	40-yard dash	10-yard split	20-yard split	20-yard shuttle	Vertical jump	Broad jump	Bench press
5 ft 10 in (1.78 m)	194 lb (88 kg)	32 1/2 in (0.83 m)	9 1/2 in (0.24 m)	4.63 s	1.63 s	2.72 s	4.40 s	28 in (0.71 m)	9 ft 3 in (2.82 m)	12 reps
All values from Pro Day

=== Seattle Seahawks ===
Oliver was selected in the eleventh round, with the 297th overall selection, by the Seattle Seahawks in the 1987 NFL draft. On August 25, 1987, he was released by the team.

=== Tampa Bay Buccaneers ===
On August 28, 1987, the Tampa Bay Buccaneers signed Oliver. On September 4, he was waived by the team.

=== Atlanta Falcons ===
On September 23, 1987, Oliver signed with the Atlanta Falcons as a replacement player. He played in two games, rushing once for no gain and catching one pass for two yards. Oliver also returned five kicks for 90 yards. On October 19, he was released by the team.

=== New York Jets ===
On May 18, 1988, Oliver signed with the New York Jets. He was released on August 2.
