= Kenny Flowers =

American football player (born 1964)

No. 48
- Position: Running back

Personal information
- Born: March 14, 1964 (age 62); Daytona Beach, Florida, U.S.
- Listed height: 6 ft 0 in (1.83 m)
- Listed weight: 210 lb (95 kg)

Career information
- High school: Spruce Creek (Port Orange, Florida)
- College: Clemson
- NFL draft: 1987: 2nd round, 31st overall pick

Career history
- Atlanta Falcons (1987–1989)

Awards and highlights
- First-team All-ACC (1985)

Career NFL statistics
- Rushing yards: 85
- Rushing average: 3.1
- Touchdowns: 1
- Stats at Pro Football Reference

Kenny Flowers (born March 14, 1964) is an American former professional football player who was a running back for the Atlanta Falcons of the National Football League (NFL). He played college football for the Clemson Tigers and was selected in the second round of the 1987 NFL draft by the Falcons with the 31st overall pick.

He attended Spruce Creek High School.
