= Major Everett =

American football player (born 1960)

No. 39
- Position: Running back

Personal information
- Born: January 4, 1960 (age 66); New Hebron, Mississippi, U.S.
- Listed height: 5 ft 10 in (1.78 m)
- Listed weight: 215 lb (98 kg)

Career information
- College: Mississippi College
- NFL draft: 1983: undrafted

Career history
- Philadelphia Eagles (1983–1985); Cleveland Browns (1986–1987); Atlanta Falcons (1987)

Career NFL statistics
- Rushing yards: 158
- Rushing average: 2.9
- Receptions: 14
- Receiving yards: 84
- Stats at Pro Football Reference

Major Donel Everett (born January 4, 1960) is an American former professional football player who was a running back for five seasons in the National Football League (NFL) with the Philadelphia Eagles, Cleveland Browns and Atlanta Falcons. He played college football for the Mississippi College Choctaws.

== Early life ==
Everett attended New Hebron High School. The Golden Bears went 11-1 his senior year, winning the 1977-78 Mid-South Conference Championship led by coach John A. Flynt. Everett was named All Conference running back and All Conference defensive back.

Everett also played basketball and ran track in high school. As a senior, he helped the New Hebron High track team win the Mid-South Conference Championship, state semifinals and state championship, competing in the 100 yard dash, 110 yard high hurdles, 180 yard low hurdles and on the 440 yard relay and 880 yard relay teams.

== College career ==
In 1983, Everett graduated from Mississippi College in Clinton, Mississippi, with a Bachelor of Science degree in mathematics. For the Mississippi College Choctaws, Everett was a Kodak Small College All American pick, a three-year All Gulf South Conference pick, and a two time MVP selectee. Topped by a career best 307 yard game versus Delta State, Everett went on to set a school mark with 3,316 yards rushing, a school mark for TDs with 35, and also caught 43 passes for 458 more yards.

=== Statistics ===
	Rushing					Receiving				
YEAR	ATT	YDS	AVG	LP	TD	NO.	YDS	AVG	LP	TD
1979	85	519	6.1	80	3	2	16	8.0	10	1
1980	161	864	5.3	67	8	7	69	9.9	21	1
1981	165	923	5.6	72	10	18	169	9.4	34	1
1982	184	1,153	6.3	76	11	16	204	12.8	27	0
Totals	597	3,316	5.8	80	32	43	458	10.7	34	3

=== College awards and honors ===
- 1979 Gulf South Conference Championship Team (football)
- 1980 All Gulf South Conference
- 1981 All Gulf South Conference
- 1982 All Gulf South Conference]
- MVP Sophomore and Senior Year
- Kodak Small College All-American
- 1980’s All Decade Team
- Team Captain Senior Year of Choctaws

== Professional career ==
Everett was selected by the Birmingham Stallions in the 13th round as the 149th pick in the 1983 USFL draft. He reported to the Birmingham Stallions camp, but did not want to play because his mother had a heart attack the day he was to report to camp. After a week in camp, the Birmingham Stallions released Everett and he went into the NFL as a free agent with the Philadelphia Eagles. He was the first player to join an NFL team after being in a USFL camp.

Everett signed as a free agent with the Philadelphia Eagles in May 1983. As a rookie in 1983, he quickly built a reputation as a special teams player extraordinaire under legendary Special Teams coach Frank Gansz with 42 tackles and 275 yards on 14 kickoff returns. In 1984, his teammates named him as Special Teams Captain after the career ending injury to team mate Bill Cowher. During that season, he played in every game leading the Eagles with 42 special teams tackles and three kick off returns for 40 yards. In 1985, Everett had 32 special teams tackles and was selected as the NFC Alternate to the Pro Bowl for Special Teams. Additionally, Everett received the Philadelphia Eagles Outstanding Special Teams Award in 1983, 1984, and 1985. Everett was instrumental in redefining the special teams role in professional football, helping to raise the profile of special teams players. In 1986, Everett joined coach Marty Schottenheimer's Cleveland Browns in week eight and contributed with 18 special teams tackles and a fumble recovery under Special Teams coach Bill Cowher. Everett had three special teams tackles in the exciting AFC Championship game dubbed "The Drive" against the Denver Broncos that season. After spending the first part of the 1987 season with the Browns, Everett completed his professional career with the Atlanta Falcons in 1987 where he played on all specialty units, even forcing a fumble from Cowboys kick-off return player, that led to a touchdown in a victory over the Dallas Cowboys.

=== Statistics ===
	Rushing						Receiving				
YEAR	TEAM	ATT	YDS	AVG	LP	TD	NO.	YDS	AVG	LP	TD
1983	PHI	5	7	1.4	7	0	2	18	9.0	11	0
1984	PHI	0	0	0	0	0	0	0	0	0	0
1985	PHI	4	13	3.3	8	0	4	25	6.3	11	0
1986	CLE	12	43	3.6	8	0	0	0	0.0	0	0
1987	CLE	34	95	2.8	16	0	8	41	5.1	10	0
1987	ATL	0	0	0.0	0	0	0	0	0.0	0	0
Totals	—	55	158	2.9	16	0	14	84	6.0	11	0

== Post-NFL career ==
Everett is the president and founder of Maj Thirty Nine, Inc., a real estate investment and development firm. In 1995, he established The Major Everett Foundation and remains active in the National Football League Players Association. Major and his wife, Valarie, actively participate in NFL events for retired players and their spouses in the Atlanta and Philadelphia areas. He supports many philanthropic efforts in the community where needed, particularly benefiting youth and educational opportunities, and health and wellness initiatives.

== Honors ==
- Everett was inducted into the Mississippi College Athletic Hall of Fame in 1998.
- Everett served on the Mississippi College Board of Trustees from 2006 to 2012.
