= James Hall (linebacker) =

American football player (born 1963)

No. 50
- Position: Linebacker

Personal information
- Born: January 27, 1963 (age 63); Natchez, Mississippi, U.S.
- Listed height: 6 ft 1 in (1.85 m)
- Listed weight: 252 lb (114 kg)

Career information
- High school: North Natchez All American football and Track
- College: Northwestern State
- NFL draft: 1987: undrafted

Career history
- San Diego Chargers (1987)*; Atlanta Falcons (1987)
- * Offseason or practice squad member only
- Stats at Pro Football Reference

James Hall (born January 27, 1963) is an American former professional football player who was a linebacker for the Atlanta Falcons of the National Football League (NFL). He played college football for the Northwestern State Demons.
