= Ronnie Washington =

American football player (born 1963)

No. 92, 91, 57
- Position: Linebacker

Personal information
- Born: July 29, 1963 (age 63); Monroe, Louisiana, U.S.
- Listed height: 6 ft 1 in (1.85 m)
- Listed weight: 245 lb (111 kg)

Career information
- High school: Richwood (Monroe)
- College: Louisiana–Monroe
- NFL draft: 1985: 8th round, 215th overall pick

Career history
- Atlanta Falcons (1985); San Diego Chargers (1986)*; Los Angeles Raiders (1987); Indianapolis Colts (1989)
- * Offseason or practice squad member only

Career NFL statistics
- Sacks: 1.5
- Fumble recoveries: 1
- Stats at Pro Football Reference

Ronald Carroll Washington (born July 29, 1963) is an American former professional football player who was a linebacker in the National Football League (NFL). He played college football for the Louisiana–Monroe Warhawks and was selected by the Atlanta Falcons in the eighth round of the 1985 NFL draft. He played for the Falcons in 1985, Los Angeles Raiders in 1987 and Indianapolis Colts in 1989.
