= Rich Kraynak =

American football player (born 1961)

No. 52, 96
- Position: Linebacker

Personal information
- Born: January 20, 1961 (age 65); Phoenixville, Pennsylvania, U.S.
- Listed height: 6 ft 1 in (1.85 m)
- Listed weight: 227 lb (103 kg)

Career information
- College: Pittsburgh
- NFL draft: 1983: 8th round, 201st overall pick

Career history
- Philadelphia Eagles (1983–1986); Atlanta Falcons (1987); Indianapolis Colts (1989)*
- * Offseason or practice squad member only

Career NFL statistics
- Interceptions: 1
- Fumble recoveries: 1
- Stats at Pro Football Reference

Richard Bernard Kraynak (born January 20, 1961) is an American former professional football player who was a linebacker in the National Football League (NFL). After playing college football for the Pittsburgh Panthers, he played five seasons in the NFL for the Philadelphia Eagles from 1983 to 1986 and Atlanta Falcons in 1987.
