= Leander Knight =

American football player (born 1963)

No. 37, 40, 20, 21
- Positions: Cornerback, Safety

Personal information
- Born: February 16, 1963 (age 63); Newark, New Jersey, U.S.
- Listed height: 6 ft 1 in (1.85 m)
- Listed weight: 193 lb (88 kg)

Career information
- High school: East Orange (NJ)
- College: Ferrum, Montclair State
- NFL draft: 1986: undrafted

Career history
- New Jersey Generals (1986); San Diego Chargers (1987)*; Atlanta Falcons (1987–1988); New York Jets (1989); Houston Oilers (1990)
- * Offseason or practice squad member only
- Stats at Pro Football Reference

Leander Knight (born February 16, 1963) is an American former professional football player who was a defensive back in the National Football League (NFL). He played college football for the Ferrum Panthers and Montclair State Red Hawks. He played in the NFL for the Atlanta Falcons from 1987 to 1988, the New York Jets in 1989 and for the Houston Oilers in 1990.
