= Lyndell Jones =

American football player (born 1959)

No. 30
- Position: Cornerback

Personal information
- Born: March 18, 1959 (age 67); Seattle, Washington, U.S.
- Listed height: 5 ft 9 in (1.75 m)
- Listed weight: 175 lb (79 kg)

Career information
- High school: Garfield (Seattle)
- College: Hawaii
- NFL draft: 1981: undrafted

Career history
- Philadelphia Eagles (1981)*; Boston Breakers (1983-1985); Atlanta Falcons (1987)
- * Offseason or practice squad member only
- Stats at Pro Football Reference

Anthony Lydell Jones (born March 18, 1959) is an American former professional football player who was a cornerback for the Atlanta Falcons of the National Football League (NFL). He played college football for the Hawaii Rainbow Warriors.
