= John Evans (American football) =

American football player (born 1964)

No. 87
- Position: Tight end

Personal information
- Born: June 13, 1964 (age 62); Houston, Texas, U.S.
- Listed height: 6 ft 2 in (1.88 m)
- Listed weight: 243 lb (110 kg)

Career information
- High school: Cy-Fair
- College: Stephen F. Austin
- NFL draft: 1987: undrafted

Career history
- Houston Oilers (1987)*; Atlanta Falcons (1987)
- * Offseason or practice squad member only
- Stats at Pro Football Reference

John Stuart Evans (born June 13, 1964) is an American former professional football player who was a tight end for the Atlanta Falcons of the National Football League (NFL). He played college football for the Stephen F. Austin Lumberjacks.
