= Joel Williams (linebacker) =

American football player (born 1956)

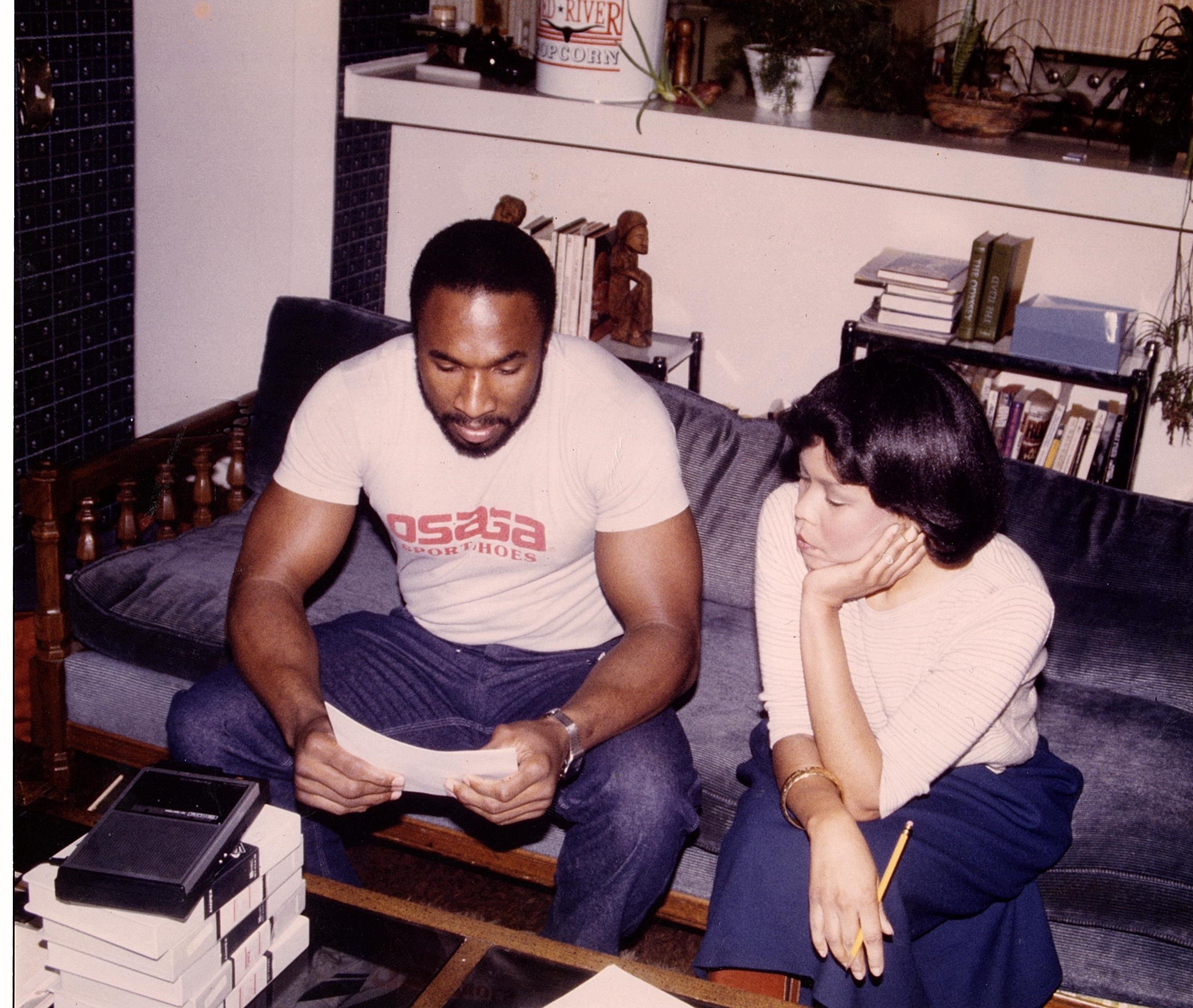
- Williams (left) in 2016

No. 58, 59, 54
- Position: Linebacker

Personal information
- Born: December 13, 1956 (age 69); Miami, Florida, U.S.
- Listed height: 6 ft 1 in (1.85 m)
- Listed weight: 222 lb (101 kg)

Career information
- High school: North Miami (North Miami, Florida)
- College: Wisconsin–La Crosse
- NFL draft: 1979: undrafted

Career history
- Miami Dolphins (1979)*; Atlanta Falcons (1979-1982); Philadelphia Eagles (1983–1985); Atlanta Falcons (1986–1989)
- * Offseason or practice squad member only

Career NFL statistics
- Sacks: 27
- Fumble recoveries: 12
- Interceptions: 5
- Stats at Pro Football Reference

Joel Williams (born December 13, 1956) is an American former professional football player who was a linebacker in the National Football League (NFL) for the Atlanta Falcons and the Philadelphia Eagles from 1979 to 1989. As a Falcon in 1980, he led the National Football Conference (NFC) in quarterback sacks with 16. In 1983, he was traded from Atlanta to Philadelphia in exchange for the Eagles' second-round pick in the 1984 NFL draft, and played for the Eagles from 1984 to 1986. After a contract dispute, he was traded back to Atlanta for a fifth-round pick in the 1986 NFL draft and was reunited with Eagles' defensive coordinator Marion Campbell, who had been hired as the Falcons' head coach. Williams finished out the remainder of his career with the Falcons. He played college football for the Wisconsin–La Crosse Eagles.
