= Mark Mraz =

American football player (born 1965)

No. 67, 72, 97
- Position: Defensive end

Personal information
- Born: February 9, 1965 (age 61); Glendale, California, U.S.
- Listed height: 6 ft 4 in (1.93 m)
- Listed weight: 258 lb (117 kg)

Career information
- High school: Glendora (CA)
- College: Utah State
- NFL draft: 1987: 5th round, 125th overall pick

Career history
- Atlanta Falcons (1987); Los Angeles Raiders (1989); Denver Broncos (1990)*; San Diego Chargers (1991)*; Frankfurt Galaxy (1991); Hamilton Tiger-Cats (1991–1992)
- * Offseason or practice squad member only

Awards and highlights
- First-team All-World League (1991)

Career NFL statistics
- Sacks: 0.5
- Stats at Pro Football Reference

Mark David Mraz (born February 9, 1965) is an American former professional football player who was a defensive end in the National Football League (NFL), World League of American Football (WLAF) and the Canadian Football League (CFL). During his career he played for the Atlanta Falcons and Los Angeles Raiders of the NFL, the Frankfurt Galaxy of the WLAF, and the Hamilton Tiger-Cats of the CFL. Mraz played college football at Utah State University.

== Professional career ==
=== Atlanta Falcons ===
Mraz was a fifth-round draft choice (125th pick overall) of the Atlanta Falcons in 1987. During his rookie season, he played in 11 of the 12 non-strike games and was primarily used on special teams but did record two quarterback sacks. Mraz was waived by the Falcons during the 1988 preseason and did not sign with another team during that campaign.

=== Los Angeles Raiders ===
In April 1989, Mraz signed with the Los Angeles Raiders, for whom he played in 11 games that year, recording 0.5 sacks.

=== Frankfurt Galaxy ===
The Frankfurt Galaxy selected Mraz in the second round (14th defensive lineman) of the 1991 WLAF positional draft. He finished the season with 6.5 sacks and earned first-team All-World League honors.
