= James Britt (American football) =

American football player (born 1960)

No. 26
- Position: Cornerback

Personal information
- Born: September 12, 1960 (age 66); Minden, Louisiana, U.S.
- Listed height: 6 ft 0 in (1.83 m)
- Listed weight: 185 lb (84 kg)

Career information
- High school: Minden
- College: LSU
- NFL draft: 1983: 2nd round, 43rd overall pick

Career history
- Atlanta Falcons (1983–1987)

Awards and highlights
- First-team All-American (1982); First-team All-SEC (1982)

Career NFL statistics
- Games played: 60
- Interceptions: 3
- INT yards: 17
- Touchdowns: 1
- Stats at Pro Football Reference

James Earl Britt (born September 12, 1960) is an American former professional football player who was a cornerback in the National Football League (NFL). He was selected by the Atlanta Falcons in the second round of the 1983 NFL draft. He played college football for the LSU Tigers.
