= Art Price =

American football player (born 1962)

No. 52
- Position: Linebacker

Personal information
- Born: May 17, 1962 (age 64); Hampton, Virginia, U.S.
- Listed height: 6 ft 3 in (1.91 m)
- Listed weight: 227 lb (103 kg)

Career information
- High school: Menchville (Newport News, Virginia)
- College: Wisconsin
- NFL draft: 1985: undrafted

Career history
- Atlanta Falcons (1985–1987)

Career NFL statistics
- Games played: 3
- Stats at Pro Football Reference

Art Price is a former linebacker in the National Football League. He played with the Atlanta Falcons during the 1987 NFL season.
