= Ken Bowen =

American football player (1962–2021)

No. 58
- Position: Linebacker

Personal information
- Born: November 15, 1962; Columbus, Georgia, U.S.
- Died: January 8, 2021 (aged 58); Florida, U.S.
- Listed height: 6 ft 1 in (1.85 m)
- Listed weight: 220 lb (100 kg)

Career information
- High school: St. Thomas Aquinas (FL)
- College: East Tennessee State
- NFL draft: 1986: undrafted

Career history
- Atlanta Falcons (1987)
- Stats at Pro Football Reference

Kenneth Edgar Bowen (November 15, 1962 – January 8, 2021) was an American football linebacker who played for the Atlanta Falcons of the National Football League (NFL). He played college football at East Tennessee State University. Bowen died on January 8, 2021, at the age of 58.
