= Jeff Kiewel =

American football player (born 1960)

No. 63
- Position: Guard

Personal information
- Born: September 27, 1960 (age 66); Tucson, Arizona, U.S.
- Listed height: 6 ft 4 in (1.93 m)
- Listed weight: 270 lb (122 kg)

Career information
- High school: Sabino (Tucson)
- College: Arizona

Career history
- Arizona Wranglers (1983–1984); Atlanta Falcons (1985–1987)

Awards and highlights
- Second-team All-American (1982); First-team All-Pac-10 (1982); Second-team All-Pac-10 (1981)
- Stats at Pro Football Reference

Jeffrey Clayton Kiewel (born September 27, 1960) is an American former professional football player who was a guard in the United States Football League (USFL) and National Football League (NFL).

Born and raised in Tucson, Arizona, Kiewel played scholastically at Sabino High School. He stayed in his hometown to play college football at the University of Arizona. As a junior, he was named second-team All-Pac-10 by the coaches. His senior year he was selected to the first-team, as well as earning second-team All-American honors from Gannett News Service.

Kiewel was selected by the Arizona Wranglers in the USFL's territorial draft and chose to sign with them. As such, he was not chosen in the NFL draft that year. He started 15 of 16 games his rookie season. In 1984, Kiewel injured his knee during the exhibition season and spent the year on the Wranglers' developmental team.

Kiewel signed with the Atlanta Falcons for the 1985 season, starting nine games. He missed the 1986 entirely, on the injured reserve list, after blowing out his knee in training camp. He returned for the 1987 season and was active for all 12 non-strike games, with no starts. He retired after the 1987 season.

Kiewel later found work in commercial insurance.
