= Andrew Provence =

American football player (born 1961)

No. 72
- Positions: Defensive tackle, defensive end

Personal information
- Born: March 8, 1961 (age 65); Savannah, Georgia, U.S.
- Listed height: 6 ft 3 in (1.91 m)
- Listed weight: 265 lb (120 kg)

Career information
- High school: Benedictine (Savannah)
- College: South Carolina
- NFL draft: 1983: 3rd round, 75th overall pick

Career history
- Atlanta Falcons (1983–1987); Denver Broncos (1988–1989)

Awards and highlights
- PFWA All-Rookie Team (1983); Third-team All-American (1982)

Career NFL statistics
- Sacks: 5
- Fumble recoveries: 2
- Stats at Pro Football Reference

Andrew Clark Provence (born March 8, 1961) is an American former professional football player who was a defensive lineman for five seasons with the Atlanta Falcons of the National Football League (NFL). He was selected by the Falcons in the third round of the 1983 NFL draft. He played college football for the South Carolina Gamecocks. Provence was also a member of the Denver Broncos.

== Early life ==
Provence was a three-year starter at Benedictine Military School in Savannah, Georgia. He was named to the Savannah News-Press All-City team in 1977 and 1978. He also earned All-State honors in 1978. Provence was inducted into the Greater Savannah Athletic Hall of Fame in 1995.

== College career ==
Provence played for the South Carolina Gamecocks of the University of South Carolina from 1979 to 1982. He recorded ten sacks his senior year in 1982, setting the school's single season sack record. He led the Gamecocks in tackles in 1981 and 1982. Provence was named an All-American by The Sporting News while garnering Associated Press Third-team All-American and Gannett News Service Second-team All-American accolades in 1982. He also played in the Senior Bowl after his senior year. He recorded 401 total tackles, 35.0 tackles for loss and 26.0 sacks during his college career. Provence was named to South Carolina's Modern Era All-Time Team. He was inducted into the University of South Carolina Athletic Hall of Fame in 2010. He was named to the SEC Football Legends Class of 2010.

== Professional career ==
Provence was selected by the Atlanta Falcons in the third round with the 75th pick in the 1983 NFL draft. He played in 69 games, starting sixteen, for the team from 1983 to 1987 and accumulated five career sacks. He was named to the NFL All-Rookie Team by the Pro Football Writers of America.

Provence was traded to the Denver Broncos in May 1988 for a tenth round pick in the 1989 NFL draft. He was placed on injured reserve on September 1, 1988, after tearing the connective tissue on his left foot during practice on August 31, 1988. He re-signed with the Broncos in July 1989. Provence was placed on injured reserve in August 1989. He was on injured reserve when the Broncos lost to the San Francisco 49ers by a score of 55–10 in Super Bowl XXIV on January 28, 1990.

== Personal life ==
Provence has worked as a mental health counselor since August 1990, months after retiring from the NFL. He also has a master's degree in professional counseling from Liberty University and is an ordained minister.
