= Charles Huff (defensive back) =

American football player (born 1963)

No. 28
- Position: Cornerback

Personal information
- Born: February 24, 1963 (age 63); Statesboro, Georgia, U.S.
- Listed height: 5 ft 11 in (1.80 m)
- Listed weight: 195 lb (88 kg)

Career information
- High school: Portal
- College: Presbyterian
- NFL draft: 1985: undrafted

Career history
- San Francisco 49ers (1985–1986); Atlanta Falcons (1987)

Career NFL statistics
- Interceptions: 2
- Stats at Pro Football Reference

Charles Huff (born February 24, 1963) is an American former professional football player who was a cornerback for the Atlanta Falcons of the National Football League (NFL). He played college football for the Presbyterian Blue Hose. Following his retirement, Huff went on to coach college football.
