= Buddy Moor =

American football player (born 1958)

No. 71
- Position: Defensive end

Personal information
- Born: December 1, 1958 (age 67); Greenville, Mississippi, U.S.
- Listed height: 6 ft 5 in (1.96 m)
- Listed weight: 250 lb (113 kg)

Career information
- High school: Lowndes (Valdosta, Georgia)
- College: Eastern Kentucky
- NFL draft: 1981: undrafted

Career history
- Philadelphia Eagles (1981)*; Philadelphia / Baltimore Stars (1983–1985); Atlanta Falcons (1987)
- * Offseason or practice squad member only

Career NFL statistics
- Games played: 3
- Sacks: 4
- Stats at Pro Football Reference

Morris Howard Moor (born December 1, 1958) is an American former professional football player who was a defensive end for the Atlanta Falcons of National Football League (NFL). He played college football for the Eastern Kentucky Colonels.
