= Leon Thomasson =

American football player (born 1963)

No. 25
- Position: Cornerback

Personal information
- Born: June 20, 1963 (age 63); Dayton, Ohio, U.S.
- Listed height: 5 ft 11 in (1.80 m)
- Listed weight: 190 lb (86 kg)

Career information
- High school: Nettie Lee Roth (Dayton)
- College: Texas Southern
- NFL draft: 1985: undrafted

Career history
- Atlanta Falcons (1985)*; Atlanta Falcons (1987)
- * Offseason or practice squad member only

Career NFL statistics
- Fumble recoveries: 1
- Stats at Pro Football Reference

Leon S. Thomasson (born June 20, 1963) is an American former professional football player who was a cornerback for the Atlanta Falcons of the National Football League (NFL). He played college football for the Texas Southern Tigers.
