= Wendell Cason =

American football player (born 1963)

No. 20
- Position: Cornerback / Safety

Personal information
- Born: January 22, 1963 (age 63); Lakewood, California, U.S.

Career information
- College: Oregon
- NFL draft: 1985: undrafted

Career history
- Atlanta Falcons (1985–1987)

Career NFL statistics
- Interceptions: 4
- Interception return yards: 40
- Fumble recoveries: 3
- Stats at Pro Football Reference

Wendell Cason (born January 22, 1963) is an American former professional football player who was a cornerback and safety in the National Football League (NFL). He played college football for the Oregon Ducks and was signed by the Atlanta Falcons as an undrafted free agent in 1985.

== Personal ==
Cason's son, Antoine, played in the NFL as well.
