= 1935 Pittsburgh Panthers football team =

American college football season

1935 Pittsburgh Panthers football
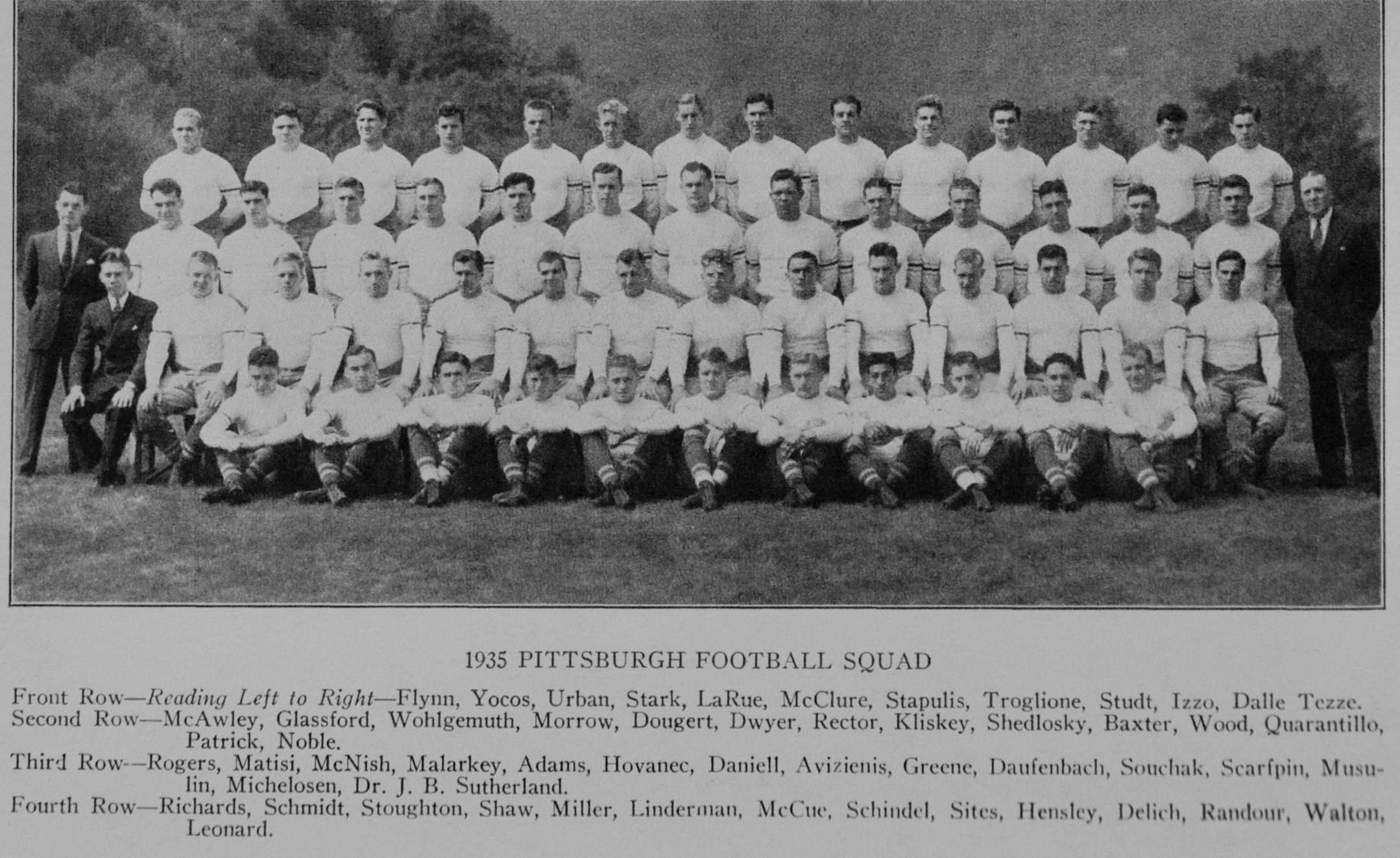
- Conference: Independent
- Record: 7–1–2
- Head coach: Jock Sutherland (12th season)
- Offensive scheme: Single-wing
- Home stadium: Pitt Stadium

1935 Eastern college football independents records
	Conf.			Overall
Team	W	L	T	W		L		T
No. 3 Princeton		–		9	–	0	–	0
No. 14 Holy Cross		–		9	–	0	–	1
NYU		–		7	–	1	–	0
Dartmouth		–		8	–	2	–	0
Northeastern		–		5	–	0	–	3
Syracuse		–		6	–	1	–	1
No. 10 Pittsburgh		–		7	–	1	–	2
No. 11 Fordham		–		6	–	1	–	2
Villanova		–		7	–	2	–	0
Franklin & Marshall		–		7	–	2	–	1
Providence		–		6	–	2	–	0
No. 18 Army		–		6	–	2	–	1
Colgate		–		7	–	3	–	0
Temple		–		7	–	3	–	0
Boston College		–		6	–	3	–	0
Bucknell		–		6	–	3	–	0
Duquesne		–		6	–	3	–	0
Yale		–		6	–	3	–	0
CCNY		–		4	–	3	–	0
Manhattan		–		5	–	3	–	1
Massachusetts State		–		5	–	4	–	0
La Salle		–		4	–	4	–	1
Penn		–		4	–	4	–	0
Penn State		–		4	–	4	–	0
Columbia		–		4	–	4	–	1
Vermont		–		4	–	5	–	0
Boston University		–		3	–	4	–	2
Harvard		–		3	–	5	–	0
Carnegie Tech		–		2	–	5	–	1
Buffalo		–		2	–	6	–	0
Tufts		–		1	–	5	–	2
Brown		–		1	–	8	–	0
Cornell		–		0	–	6	–	1
Rankings from United Press

The 1935 Pittsburgh Panthers football team was an American football team that represented the University of Pittsburgh as an independent during the 1935 college football season. In its 12th season under head coach Jock Sutherland, the team compiled a 7–1–2 record, shut out six of its ten opponents, and outscored all opponents by a total of 135 to 28. The team played its home games at Pitt Stadium in Pittsburgh.

== Schedule ==
Date	Opponent	Site	Result	Attendance	Source
September 28	Waynesburg	Pitt Stadium; Pittsburgh, PA	W 14–0	10,000	
October 5	at Washington & Jefferson	College Field; Washington, PA	W 35–0	6,000–8,000	
October 12	West Virginia	Pitt Stadium; Pittsburgh, PA (rivalry)	W 24–6	20,000	
October 19	at Notre Dame	Notre Dame Stadium; Notre Dame, IN (rivalry)	L 6–9	39,989–51,000	
October 26	Penn State	Pitt Stadium; Pittsburgh, PA (rivalry)	W 9–0	17,310	
November 2	at Fordham	Polo Grounds; New York, NY	T 0–0	35,000	
November 9	Army	Pitt Stadium; Pittsburgh, PA	W 29–6	68,000	
November 16	Nebraska	Pitt Stadium; Pittsburgh, PA	W 6–0	30,000	
November 28	Carnegie Tech	Pitt Stadium; Pittsburgh, PA	T 0–0	25,000	
December 14	at USC	Los Angeles Memorial Coliseum; Los Angeles, CA	W 12–7	30,000–35,000	

== Preseason ==
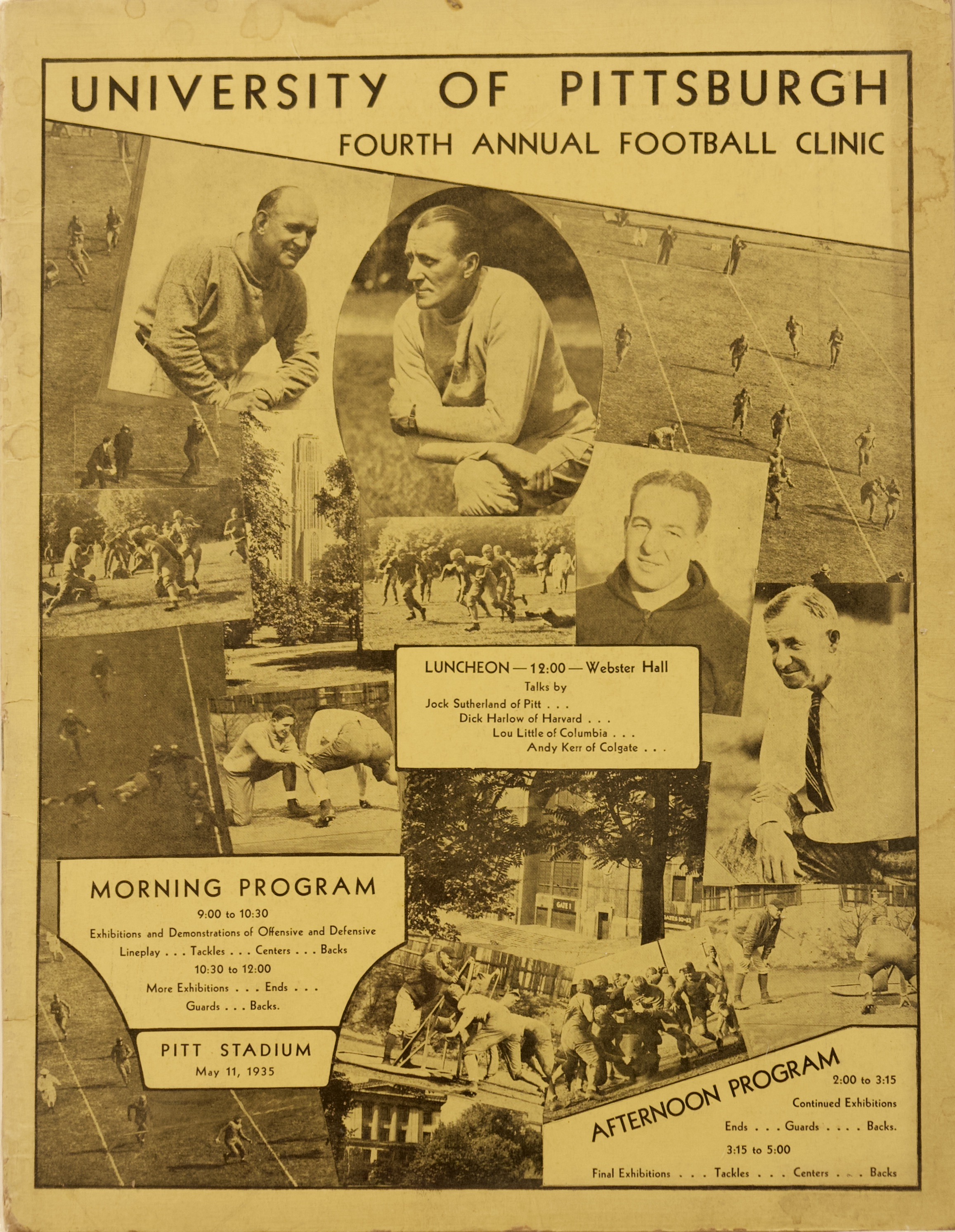
May 11, 1935 Fourth Annual Football Clinic program at Pitt Stadium

On March 18, Coach Sutherland and his assistants welcomed 63 football players for spring practice. After losing 14 seniors to graduation, Sutherland needed plenty of able-bodied replacements for his two-deep rotation. After five weeks of drills, Coach Sutherland invited Christie Flanagan and his Duquesne team to a scrimmage on Trees Field. It was a fun afternoon for both coaches and players. The game was run in regulation style, but the quarters were 10 minutes in length, players could substitute at will, coaches roamed the field and no touchdowns were scored. That exercise was a warm-up for the May 4 Varsity versus Alumni scrimmage to close the spring practice session. The varsity prevailed 10 to 0 on the strength of Leon Shedlosky's 62-yard touchdown scamper in the third quarter. Frank Patrick converted the extra point and followed that up with a 25-yard field goal to end the scoring. The Alumni made a last gasp attempt to score but were stopped at the two-yard line as time ran out.

On May 11, Jock Sutherland held his Fourth Annual Football Clinic at Pitt Stadium for 1500 high school coaches and players. He was aided by head coaches Andy Kerr of Colgate and Dick Harlow of Harvard, in addition to his Pitt assistants and varsity team. The all-day affair consisted of a morning session with demonstrations and exhibitions of offensive and defensive tactics on the field, lunch with lectures by the visiting coaches, and an afternoon session back on the field.

On September 8, Coach Sutherland began his twelfth season at Pitt by welcoming 52 potential squad members to the Camp Hamilton preseason training facility. Jess Carver of the Sun-Telegraph noted that Coach Sutherland "faces a fairly formidable schedule and the prospect of rebuilding, practically in its entirety his varsity riddled by the loss of outstanding stars from last year's powerful eleven. He needs to develop a new line and a new backfield, and when you've said that, you've covered the situation pretty well." After two weeks of two-a-day practices, the final day regulation game was won by the first team 14 to 0. Leon Shedlosky ran for two touchdowns and Frank Patrick added the extra points. The squad returned to campus for the start of classes and final preparation for the opening game versus Waynesburg.

The Pitt News reported: "Dr. John B. Sutherland, head football coach, Don Saunders, director of alumni publications, and a male quartet composed of University men, are on the air every Tuesday night in a 15-minute broadcast over radio station WCAE. Football. music and gridiron philosophy, as presented by Coach 'Jock' in informal interview chats with Saunders, will be presented in a 12-week series. Each week a flashback of heroic football play will be enacted. The series, sponsored by a food corporation, has already been acclaimed by Pittsburgh radio editors."

== Coaching staff ==
1935 Pittsburgh Panthers football staff
Coaching staff: John B. "Jock" Sutherland – Head coach; Bill Kern – Assistant coach; Charley Bowser – Assistant coach; Ralph N. Daugherty - center coach; Edward Hirshberg – end coach; Edward Baker – backfield coach; Howard O'Dell – backfield coach; Walter Milligan– Freshman coach	Support staff: Dr. Ralph Shanor – team physician; George Moore – team trainer; Percy S. Browne – custodian of equipment; W. D. Harrison - director of athletics; James Hagan – graduate manager of athletics; Frank Carver – publicity director; Stewart McAwley – co-varsity student manager; Joseph Rodgers – co-varsity student manager

== Roster ==
1935 Pittsburgh Panthers football roster
Player	Position	Games	Height	Weight	Class	Prep School	Hometown
Nicholas Kliskey*	fullback	10	5' 7"	186	1936	Scott H. S.	North Braddock, PA
Vincent Sites*	end	10	6' 1"	189	1936	St. John's H. S.	Pittston, PA
Robert LaRue*	halfback	10	5' 9"	160	1936	Wyoming Seminary	Greensburg, PA
Leon Shedlosky*	halfback	9	5' 9"	165	1936	Nanticoke H. S.	Nanticoke, PA
Frank Souchak*	end	9	6'	188	1938	Berwick H. S.	Berwick., PA
William Glassford*	guard	10	5' 9"	180	1936	Lancaster H. S.	Lancaster, Ohio
Averell Daniell*	tackle	8	6' 1"	193	1937	Mt. Lebanon H. S.	Mt. Lebanon, PA
Arthur Detzel*	tackle	10	5' 10"	189	1936	Erie East H. S.	Erie, PA
Leo Malarkey*	halfback	7	5' 10"	165	1937	McDonald H. S.	McDonald, PA
Verne Baxter	end	0	5' 10"	170	1936	Oliver H. S.	Joliet, IL
Donald Hensley*	center	9	6' 1"	190	1938	Huntington H. S.	Huntington, WV
Arnold Greene*	quarterback	8	6' 1"	195	1937	Huntingdon H. S.	Huntingdon, PA
John Michelosen*	quarterback	10	6'	180	1938	Ambridge H. S.	Ambridge, PA
James Scarfpin	guard	5	5' 10"	180	1937	Altoona H. S.	Martins Ferry, OH
Peter Avizienis	tackle	1	6' 1"	193	1937	Mt. Carmel H. S.	Mt. Carmel, PA
Leonard Rector	fullback	4	5' 9"	175	1936	Avella H. S.	Avella, PA
Arthur Leonard	quarterback	0	5' 10"	168	1938		Pittsburgh, PA
John Dougert	fullback	5	5' 8"	160	1937	Shenandoah H. S.	Shenandoah, PA
Earl McCue	guard	1	6' 1"	175	1936	Wilkinsburg H. S.	Wilkinsburg, PA
John Wood	halfback	7	5' 10"	160	1937	Magrotta H. S.	New Martinsville, WV
Frank Patrick*	fullback	10	6'	192	1938	Roosevelt H. S.	East Chicago, IN
Henry Adams	center	3	6' 1"	182	1938	California H. S.	California, PA
Leon Wohlgemuth	guard	4	5' 10"	179	1937	Bellaire H. S.	Bellaire, OH
Marwood Stark*	guard	6	5' 10"	169	1936	Allentown H. S.	Allentown, PA
Anthony Matisi*	tackle	8	6'	204	1938	Endicott H. S.	Endicott, NY
Arthur Schindel	end	1	6'	174	1936	Aurora H. S.	Aurora, IL
Bernard McNish	end	1	5' 11"	167	1937	Elizabeth H. S.	Elizabeth, PA
Regis Flynn	end	1	5' 10"	156	1937	McKeesport H. S.	McKeesport, PA
Hubert Randour*	halfback	10	5' 11"	168	1936	McDonald H. S.	McDonald, PA
Robert McClure	quarterback	5	5' 8"	157	1937	Greenville H. S.	Greenville, PA
Joseph Troglione	halfback	0	5' 9"	164	1936	Wilkinsburg H. S.	Wilkinsburg, PA
Charles Izzo	quarterback	0	5' 10"	167	1938	Perkiomen Prep	Bronx, NY
Paul Shaw*	end	10	5' 11"	184	1938	Bradford H. S.	Bradford, PA
Joseph Morrow	end	0	5' 10"	179	1938	Mars H. S.	Mars, PA
Frank Hovanec	end	0	5' 11"	175	1938	Ambridge H. S.	Ambridge, PA
Gene Stoughton	tackle	0	5' 11"	180	1936	Oil City H. S.	Oil City, PA
George Musulin	tackle	1	5' 11"	210	1938	Mt. Lebanon H.S.	Mt. Lebanon, PA
Cleon Linderman	center	2	6'	177	1937	Allegheny H. S.	Allegheny, NY
William Stapulis*	halfback	9	5' 10"	175	1938	California H. S.	California, PA
Luther Richards*	guard	10	5' 10"	182	1938	Kingston H. S.	Kingston, PA
Walter Miller*	end	7	6'	184	1938	Phillipsburg H. S.	Phillipsburg, NJ
John Urban	halfback	3	5' 11"	156	1938	Larksville H. S.	Larksville, PA
George Yocos	guard	3	5' 9"	175	1938	Monessen H. S.	Monessen, PA
Albert Walton	guard	3	6'	177	1937	Beaver Falls H. S.	Beaver Falls, PA
Paul Studt	halfback	0	5' 10"	158	1938		Pittsburgh, PA
Richard Noble	halfback	1	5' 10"	163	1938	Freeport H. S.	Freeport, PA
Edward Quarantillo	end	2	5' 11"	177	1938	Niagara Falls H. S.	Niagara Falls, NY
George Delich*	tackle	8	6'	190	1938	Froebel H.S.	Gary, IN
Ted Schmidt	tackle	2	6'	197	1938	Carrick H. S.	Carrick, PA
Robert Daufenbach	tackle	0	6' 1"	172	1938		Pittsburgh, PA
Dante Dalle Tezze*	guard	10	5' 11"	185	1938	Jeannette H. S.	Jeannette, PA
Stewart McAwley*	co-varsity student manager				1936	Salina H. S.	Salina, PA
Joseph Rodgers*	co-varsity student manager				1936	Monessen H. S.	Monessen, PA
* Letterman

== Game summaries ==
=== Waynesburg ===
Week 1: Waynesburg at Pitt

Team	1	2	3	4	Total
Waynesburg	0	0	0	0	0
• Pitt	0	7	7	0	14

- Date: September 28, 1935
- Location: Pitt Stadium
  Pittsburgh, PA
- Game start: 2:00 p.m.
- Game attendance: 10,000
- Game weather: cloudy with drizzle
- Referee: W. H. Friesell (Princeton)

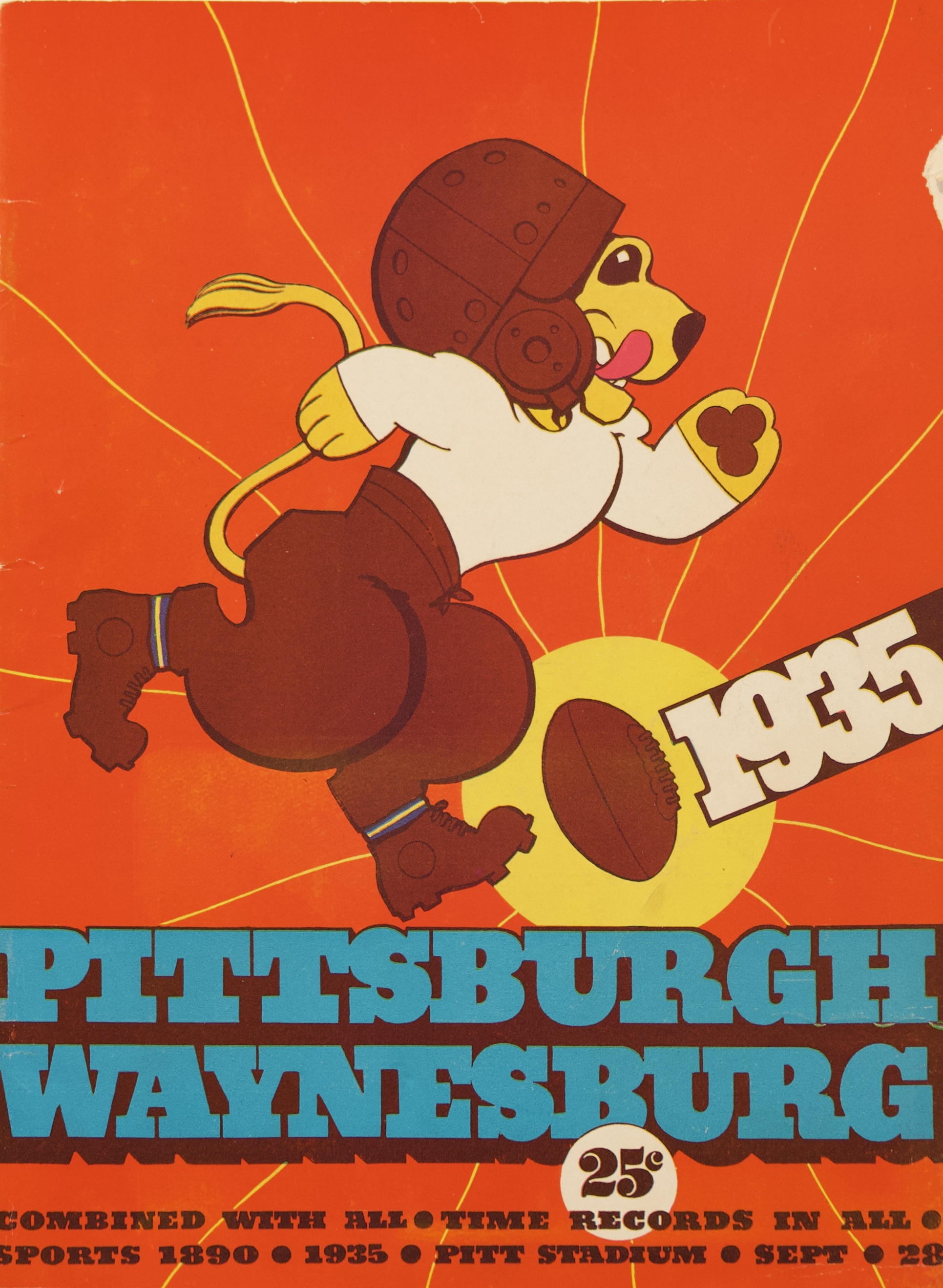
Program for September 28 game vs. Waynesburg

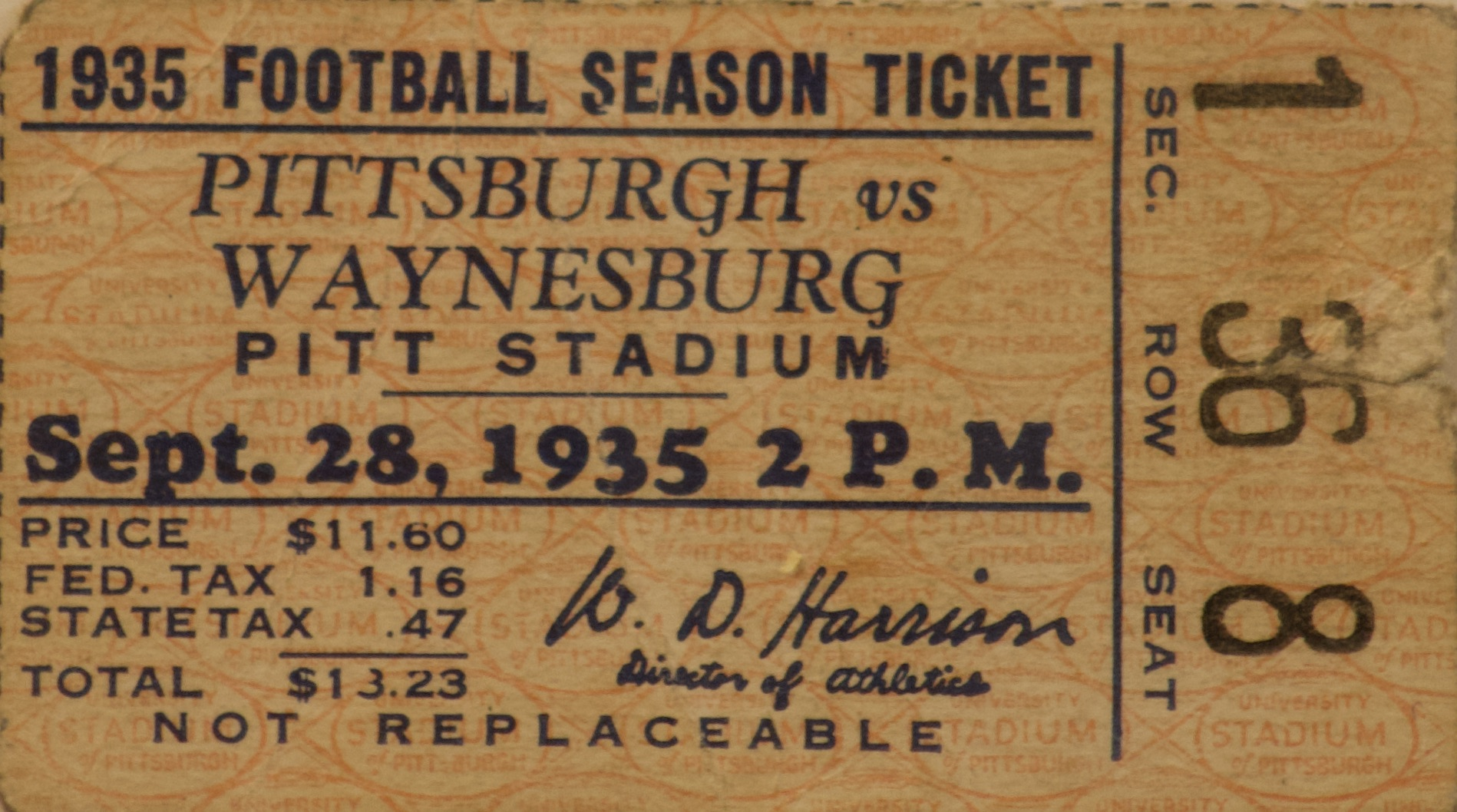
Ticket stub for September 28 game versus Waynesburg

The Panthers opened the season against the Waynesburg Yellow Jackets. In 1897 the Jackets defeated the Western University of Pennsylvania 14 to 5. Pitt won the next four meetings, outscoring the Jackets 230 to 0. The Pittsburgh Press reported that Waynesburg coach Frank Wolf "entertained no false hopes of winning from Pitt. He has indicated he will be satisfied if the Jackets show some defensive spunk and gain a little ground on their own."

For the first time Coach Sutherland played 11 players who had never started a game for Pitt. He told The Pittsburgh Press: "We've had experimental games before but in all my experience, I can't recall one quite like the one we face tomorrow. I will experiment with as many men as I dare. If I see a combination that clicks, whether for one touchdown or half a dozen, there's my first team for the rest of the football season."

The Pitt offense started strong and drove the ball 60 yards to the Jackets 1-yard line, but lost the ball on downs. Waynesburg punted out of trouble, and held the Panthers scoreless in the first period. At the start of the second quarter, Pitt gained possession on the Yellow Jackets 37-yard line. The second team offense scored in five plays. Bill Stapulis went over left guard for the score. Leonard Rector converted the placement and Pitt led 7 to 0 at halftime. After receiving the second half kick-off, the Pitt first stringers produced a 68-yard scoring drive. Sophomore fullback Frank Patrick scored the touchdown and converted the extra point. The Panthers' offense was unable to penetrate the Waynesburg 35-yard line the remainder of the game. The Waynesburg offense only managed to gain 3 first downs, but their defense and punting kept the Panthers from turning the game into a rout. Waynesburg finished the season with a 4–4–1 record. Pitt and Waynesburg would not meet again on the gridiron.

Coach Sutherland expressed his displeasure: "I'm not very much pleased with either the offensive or defensive work of our players. I didn't expect much in the opening game–and didn't get even that much. It was far from an auspicious opener and we will have to show a great deal of improvement if we expect to beat anybody–and there are plenty of strong opponents ahead of us...The visiting players fought hard and showed that they have been drilled in fundamentals by their coach."

The Pitt starting lineup for the game against Waynesburg was Frank Souchak (left end), Averell Daniell (left tackle), William Glassford (left guard), Nick Kliskey (center), Dante Dalle Tezze (right guard), George Delich (right tackle), Edward Quarantillo (right end), Arnold Greene (quarterback), Hubert Randour (left halfback), Leon Shedlosky (right halfback) and Frank Patrick (fullback). Substitutes appearing in the game for Pitt were Paul Shaw, Vincent Sites, James Scarpfin, Arthur Detzel, Luther Richards, Leon Wohlgemuth, Hensley, John Michelosen, Bobby LaRue, John Wood, William Stapulis and Leonard Rector.

Scoring summary

Quarter	Time	Drive			Team	Scoring information	Score	
Quarter	Time	Plays	Yards	TOP	Team	Scoring information	Waynesburg	Pittsburgh
2		5	37		Pittsburgh	William Stapulis 1-yard touchdown run, Leonard Rector kick good	0	7
3		14	68		Pittsburgh	Frank Patrick 1-yard touchdown run, Patrick kick good	0	14
"TOP" = time of possession. For other American football terms, see Glossary of American football.							0	14

=== At Washington & Jefferson ===
Week 2: Pitt at W. & J.

Team	1	2	3	4	Total
• Pitt	13	10	6	6	35
W. & J.	0	0	0	0	0

- Date: October 5, 1935
- Location: College Field
  Washington, PA
- Game start: 2:30 p.m.
- Game attendance: 6,000-8,000
- Game weather: perfect
- Referee: D. W. Very (Penn State)

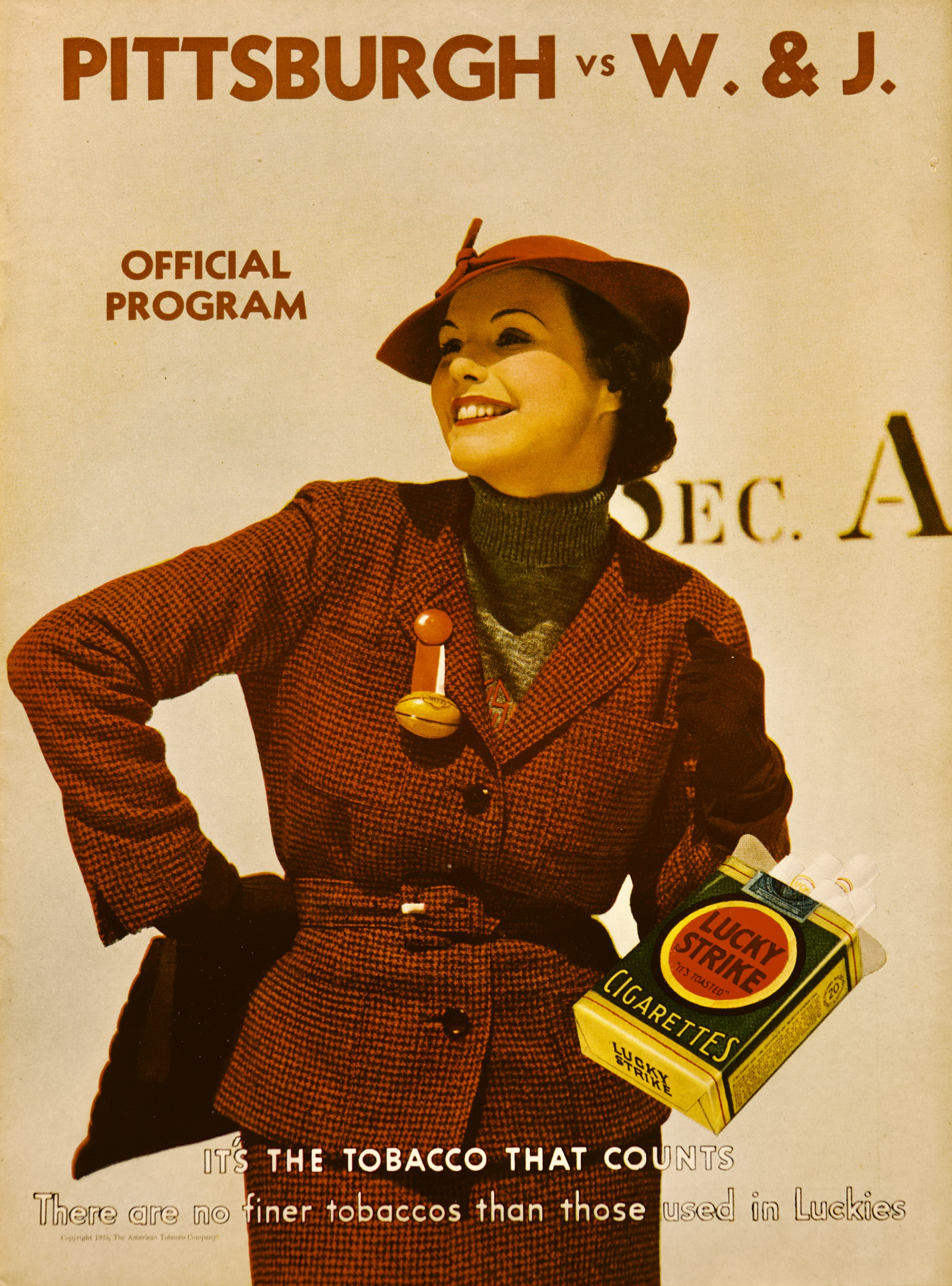
Program for October 5 game versus W. & J.

The thirty-third and final gridiron game between the Pitt Panthers and Washington & Jefferson Presidents took place on October 5 at College Field in Washington, PA. The Western University of Pennsylvania played the first five games of the series (1890 – 1895) on W. & J. soil. When the series was renewed in 1905, the next 27 games were played in Pittsburgh. The Panthers led the series 17–13–2. Claire Burcky of The Pittsburgh Press noted: "A football season unique in the history of Washington and Jefferson College athletics was to begin this afternoon at College Field, where the deflated, de-emphasized, perhaps demoralized Presidents were to meet the Pitt Panthers. From the well-subsidized national championship eleven of 1921 which outplayed a California team of giants in the Rose Bowl, Wash-Jeff gradually has pared grid expenses to the point where today she claims a simon-pure amateur group of boys who give rather than receive for their playing privileges." Coach Hank Day had a squad of 35 players, which contained 13 lettermen ready for the opener.

Coach Sutherland made minor lineup changes for the game. He inserted end Vincent Sites and halfback Bobby LaRue, both of whom recovered from their preseason injuries, into the starting lineup. Art Detzel replaced the injured George Delich at right tackle and John Michelosen replaced Arnold Greene at quarterback.

In front of about 7,000 fans, the Panthers closed out the series at W. & J. with a five touchdown barrage to win 35 to 0. Frank Patrick led the Pitt offense with 22 points by scoring three touchdowns, a field goal and an extra point. Pitt kicked off but gained possession when Bobby LaRue recovered W. & J. fullback Etzweiler's fumble on the Presidents' 35-yard line. Patrick scored 6 plays later from three yards out and booted the placement for a 7 to 0 Panther lead. The Pitt defense forced a punt and the Pitt offense sustained a 50-yard drive with Patrick again scoring the touchdown. The extra point was botched, and Pitt led 13 to 0 at the end of the first quarter. Sutherland played the second string in the second period. Leon Shedlosky intercepted an errant W. & J. pass and carried the ball to the Presidents' 42-yard line. The ensuing eight play drive ended with Leonard Rector scoring on a 2-yard run. Frank Souchak converted the point after. The Panthers capped the first half scoring with Patrick's 18-yard field goal. Halftime: Pitt 23 – W. & J. 0. Early in the third quarter, Patrick recovered a W. & J. fumble on the Presidents' 30-yard line. Six plays later he scored his third rushing touchdown from the 2-yard line. The third string produced the most exciting score of the game in the last period. Pitt halfback Jack Dougert intercepted W. & J.'s halfback Russo's desperation pass on the Pitt 41-yard line, and with blockers in front, raced downfield. At the W. & J. 20-yard line, as he was about to be tackled, he lateraled to a trailing John Wood, who carried the ball into the end zone for the final touchdown.

The Presidents finished the season with a 4–4 record. The Pittsburgh Press reported: "The gradual de-emphasis of football at the Washington school, begun several years ago, has brought the Presidents to the point where they claim to be free of any subsidization. While deflating their football, the Presidents also have come back to a schedule more befitting the size of the school... In future seasons, the Prexies plan to play a schedule of Class B proportions."

The Pitt starting lineup for the last game against Washington & Jefferson was Frank Souchak (left end), Averell Daniell (left tackle), William Glassford (left guard), Nick Kliskey (center), Dante Dalle Tezze (right guard), Arthur Detzel (right tackle), Vincent Sites (right end), John Michelosen (quarterback), Hubert Randour (left halfback), Bobby LaRue (right halfback) and Frank Patrick (fullback). Substitutes appearing in the game for Pitt were Paul Shaw, Edward Quarantillo, Leon Shedlosky, James Scarpfin, Luther Richards, Leon Wohlgemuth, Don Hensley, John Wood, William Stapulis, Leonard Rector, Walter Miller, Bernard McNish, Tony Matisi, Ted Schmidt, George Yocos, Cleon Linderman, Robert McClure, Leo Malarkey and John Dougert.

Scoring summary

Quarter	Time	Drive			Team	Scoring information	Score	
Quarter	Time	Plays	Yards	TOP	Team	Scoring information	Pittsburgh	Washington & Jefferson
1		6	35		Pittsburgh	Frank Patrick 3-yard touchdown run, Patrick kick good	0	7
1		12	50		Pittsburgh	Patrick 3-yard touchdown run, Patrick kick no good	0	13
2		8	42		Pittsburgh	Leonard Rector 2-yard touchdown run, Frank Souchak kick good	0	20
2			72		Pittsburgh	18-yard field goal by Frank Patrick	0	23
3		6	30		Pittsburgh	Patrick 2-yard touchdown run, Patrick kick no good	0	29
4		1	59		Pittsburgh	John Wood lateral from John Dougert 59-yard touchdown run, kick no good	0	35
"TOP" = time of possession. For other American football terms, see Glossary of American football.							35	0

=== West Virginia ===
Week 3: West Virginia at Pitt

Team	1	2	3	4	Total
West Virginia	0	6	0	0	6
• Pitt	7	7	10	0	24

- Date: October 12, 1935
- Location: Pitt Stadium
  Pittsburgh, PA
- Game start: 2:00 p.m.
- Game attendance: 20,000
- Game weather: sunny
- Referee: Harry O. Dayoff (Bucknell)

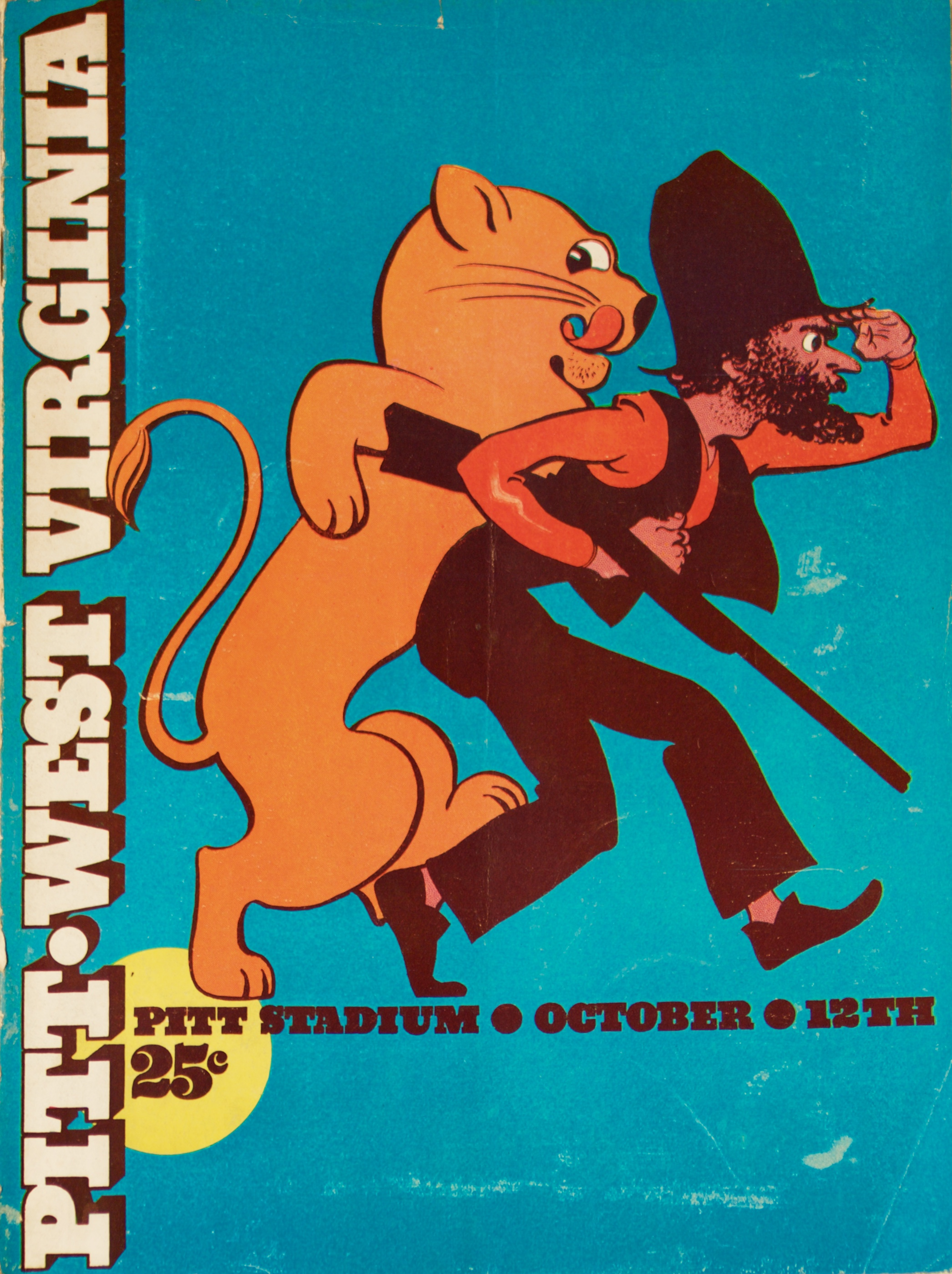
Program for October 12 game versus West Virginia

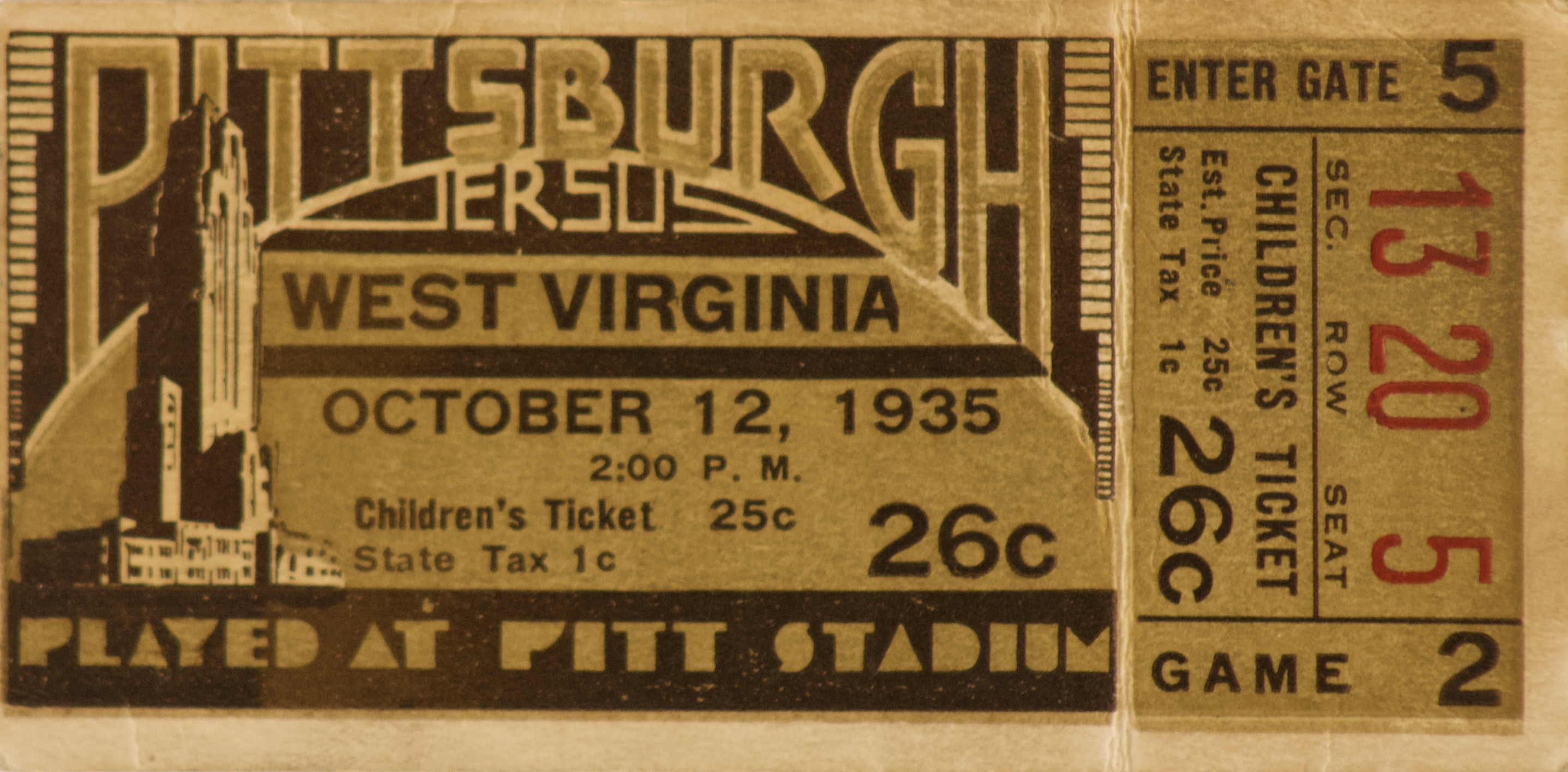
Ticket stub for October 12 game versus West Virginia

On October 12, second-year coach Trusty Tallman brought his West Virginia Mountaineers to the 'Burgh for the annual game with Pitt. West Virginia won 5 of the first 6 games played in 1895–1903. From 1904 on, Pitt managed to win 20 of the next 24 with one tie, so the overall series record stood 21–8–1 in Pitt's favor.

The Mountaineers had a 1-1 record. They tied West Virginia Wesleyan (0–0) in their home opener and then beat Davis & Elkins (20–0) in their first road game. Coach Tallman told The Pittsburgh Press: "Our chief trouble is that when we started practice the boys first asked the date of the Pitt game. They didn't care who came ahead on the schedule. And you see what's happened to our record...But I'll tell you. Give us our share of the breaks against Pitt and if our first 18 boys can hold up, it'll be a rough afternoon out there for the Panthers."

The Panthers again needed to make some lineup adjustments. First, end Edward Quarantillo got married and was booted off the team. The University of Pittsburgh Athletic Council passed a resolution prior to the season that banned the players from getting married and participating in sports. Senior end Verne Baxter was ill and not in shape to play. Ends Frank Souchak and Bernard McNish along with tackle Averell Daniell were injured in Thursday's practice. Tony Matisi replaced Daniell at tackle and Regis Flynn would step in at end if Souchak could not play.

Pitt earned their seventh straight victory over the Mountaineers by a 24 to 6 margin in front of 20,000 fans. The Panthers got on the scoreboard late in the first period when Hubert Randour intercepted Mountaineer halfback Kelly Moan's pass on the West Virginia 48-yard line and returned it to the 39-yard line. After gaining a first down with three running plays, Randour completed a 29-yard pass to Bobby LaRue for the score. Frank Patrick converted the first of his three extra points on the day and Pitt led 7 to 0. Early in the second quarter the Mountaineers gained possession on the Pitt 40-yard line. On first down, Moan passed to end Herbert Barna for the touchdown. Robert Kyle missed the placement. With Pitt only leading by a single point, they received the kick-off, and their offense sustained a 74-yard drive for their second touchdown. Bobby LaRue's 40-yard dash climaxed the march and Pitt led at halftime 14 to 6. Pitt added 10 points in the third quarter, as Frank Patrick booted a 21-yard field goal and then bulled into the end zone from the 1-yard line, after Pitt recovered a Mountaineer fumble on the West Virginia 2-yard line. Sutherland emptied his bench for the final quarter and thirty-six Panthers got some playing time. West Virginia finished the season with a 3–4–2 record.

Harry Keck of the Sun-Telegraph added: "West Virginia gummed up the programs by appearing in new gold jerseys, with all of the numbers switched around, which made it just ducky for the customers and the scribes to follow its players. There ought to be a law!"

Jock Sutherland wrote in the Sun-Telegraph: "The game was very hard fought. Perhaps we didn't deserve as many points as we got. I'm satisfied with the result, but not quite with the Pitt team as it played. West Virginia played better than the score indicates."

The Pitt starting lineup for the game against West Virginia was Frank Souchak (left end), Tony Matisi (left tackle), William Glassford (left guard), Nick Kliskey (center), Dante Delle Tezze (right guard), Arthur Detzel (right tackle), Vincent Sites (right end), John Michelosen (quarterback), Hubert Randour (left halfback), Bobby LaRue (right halfback) and Frank Patrick (fullback). Substitutes appearing in the game for Pitt were George Delich, Arnold Greene, Paul Shaw, James Scarpfin, Luther Richards, Leon Wohlgemuth, Don Hensley, John Wood, William Stapulis, Leonard Rector, Walter Miller, George Yocos, Cleon Linderman, Robert McClure, Leo Malarkey, John Dougert, Regis Flynn, Peter Aviziensis, Albert Walton, Earl McCue, Marwood Stark, Henry Adams, Arthur Shindell, George Musulin and John Urban.

Scoring summary

Quarter	Time	Drive			Team	Scoring information	Score	
Quarter	Time	Plays	Yards	TOP	Team	Scoring information	West Virginia	Pittsburgh
1		4	39		Pittsburgh	Bobby LaRue 29-yard touchdown reception from Hubert Randour, Frank Patrick kick good	0	7
2		1	40		West Virginia	Herbert Barna 40-yard touchdown reception from Kelly Moan, Robert Kyle kick no good	6	7
2		7	74		Pittsburgh	LaRue 40-yard touchdown run, Patrick kick good	6	14
3		4	20		Pittsburgh	21-yard field goal by Patrick	6	17
3		2	2		Pittsburgh	Patrick 1-yard touchdown run, Patrick kick good	6	24
"TOP" = time of possession. For other American football terms, see Glossary of American football.							6	24

=== At Notre Dame ===
Week 4: Pitt at Notre Dame

Team	1	2	3	4	Total
Pitt	0	6	0	0	6
• Notre Dame	0	6	0	3	9

- Date: October 19, 1935
- Location: Notre Dame Stadium
  Notre Dame, IN
- Game start: 2:00 p.m.
- Game attendance: 51,000
- Game weather: clear and cool
- Referee: Frank Lane (Cincinnati)

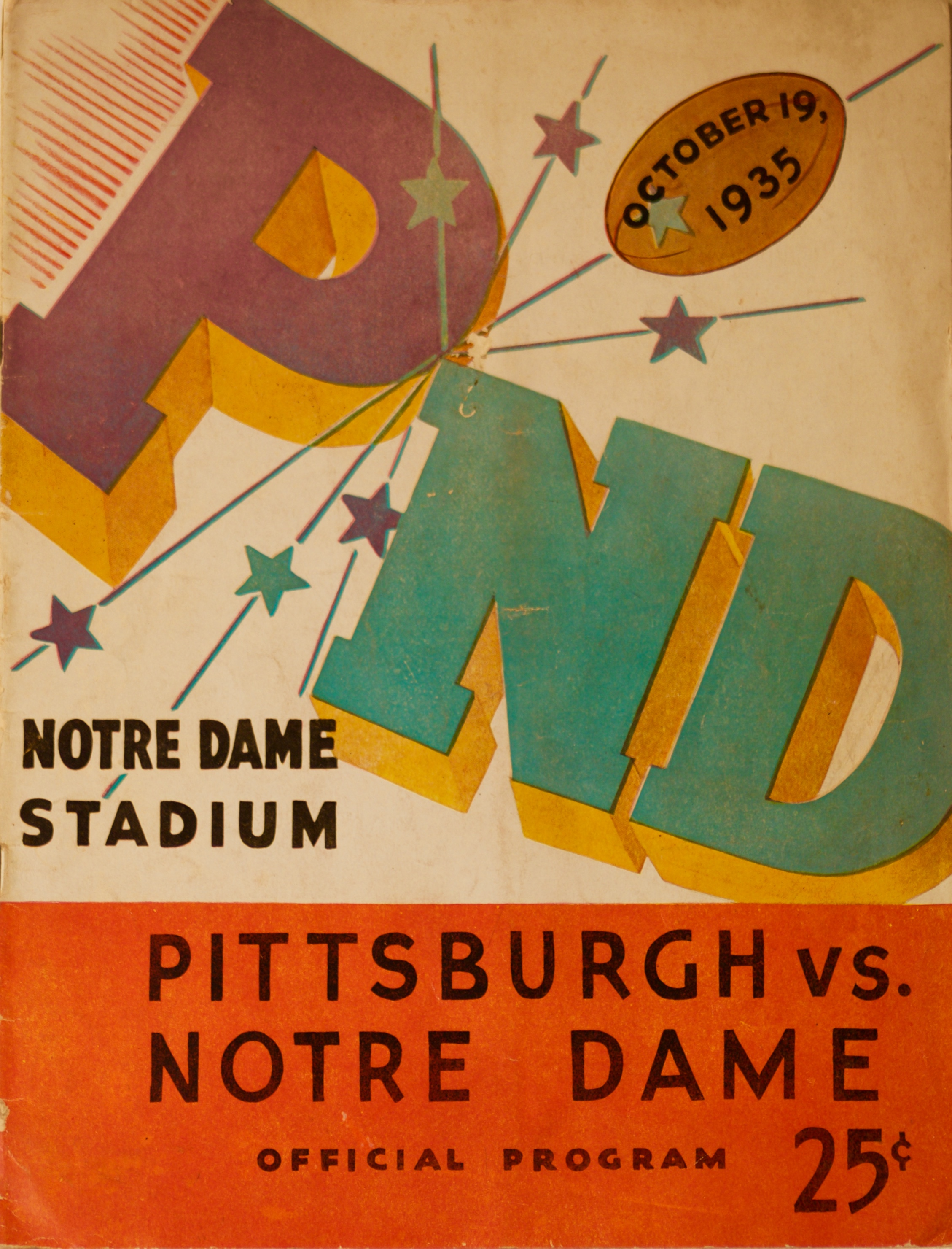
Program for the October 19 game versus Notre Dame

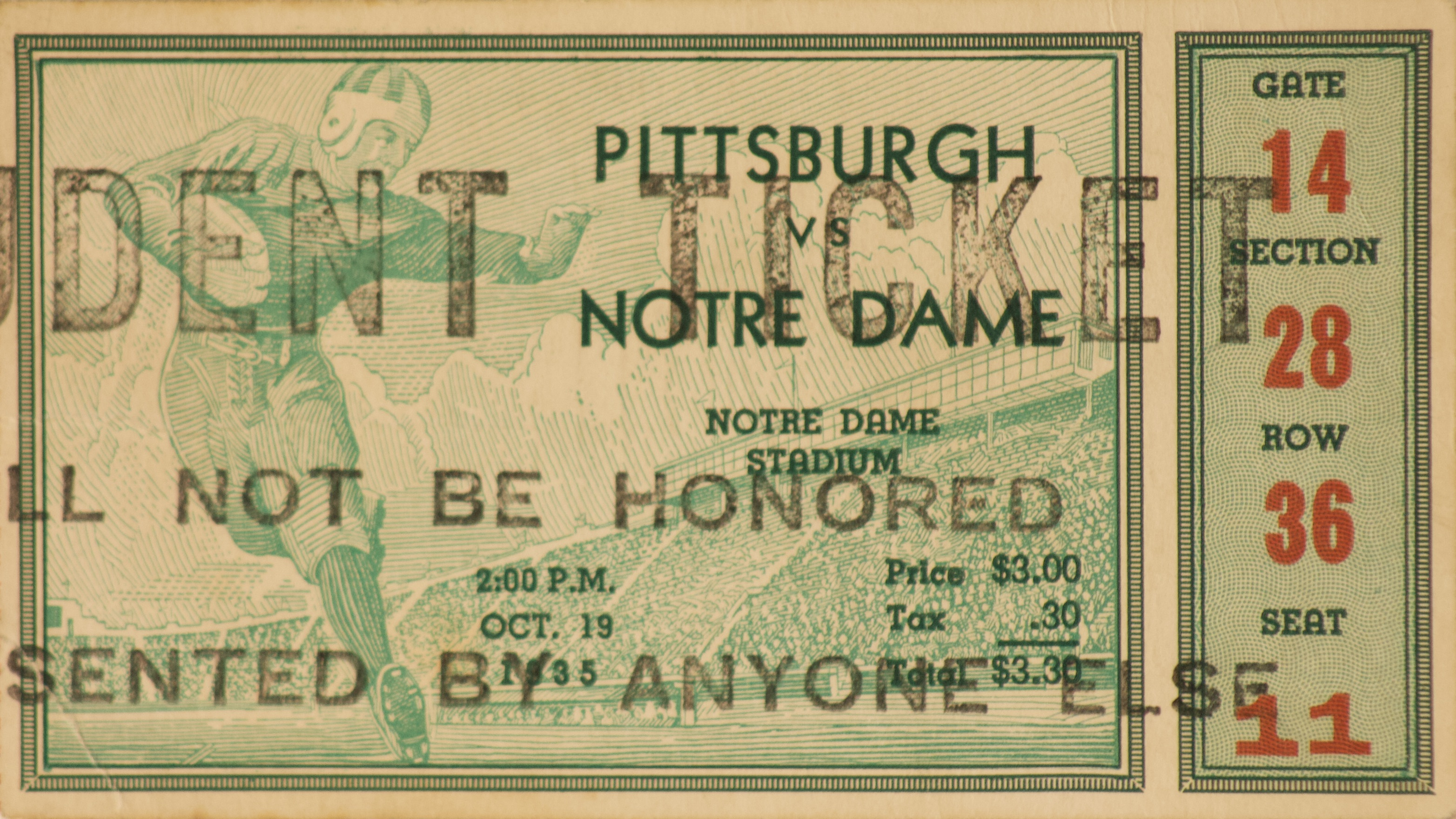
Ticket stub for October 19 game versus Notre Dame

The Panthers second road trip was west to South Bend, Indiana to play coach Elmer Layden's Fighting Irish. Pitt trailed in the all-time series 3–4–1, but the Panthers had won and not given up a point to Notre Dame in their three previous games.

The Irish were 3–0 on the season. They beat Kansas (28–7), Carnegie Tech (14–3) and Wisconsin (27–0). Coach Layden had two All-Americans in his lineup – end Wayne Millner and fullback William Shakespeare plus twenty-one lettermen hoping to finally gain a victory over Pittsburgh. Starting tackle John Michuta reaggravated an old head injury during the Wisconsin game and was lost for the remainder of the season. Wayne Millner told Jack Ledden of The South Bend Tribune: "I'm ready for the game of my life. Pittsburgh is going to pay for those defeats this year. We may not have the best team in the world but we're good enough to lick Pittsburgh."

The Panthers' train left Pittsburgh Thursday night and arrived in Niles, Michigan on Friday morning. The Panther contingent quartered at the Four Flags Hotel. After lunch, the team bussed the six miles to Notre Dame Stadium for an afternoon workout. Chester L. Smith of The Pittsburgh Press noted: "Niles is an ideal place to remain on the eve of a game; they take in the sidewalks at 9:00 o'clock and there is nothing to do but go to bed." Sutherland decided to start Frank Souchak and Paul Shaw at ends and Tony Matisi at tackle.

After losing to the Panthers for three straight years, Notre Dame gained a modicum of revenge with a come-from-behind 9 to 6 victory in front of 51,000 fans. In the first quarter Panther halfback Hubert Randour rambled 62-yards to the Irish 18-yard line. The Panther offense stalled and Frank Patrick's field goal was wide of the uprights. The Panthers gained possession late in the quarter on the Notre Dame 48-yard line. From there, the Panther offense sustained a 12-play scoring drive, culminating with Frank Patrick going through tackle from the 1-yard line for the touchdown. His extra point attempt was blocked, but Notre Dame was offside. Irish end Wayne Millner blocked the second attempt and Pitt led 6 to 0. The Panther defense forced the Irish to punt from their end zone. William Shakespeare boomed the ball 86 yards to the Pitt 14-yard line. Leon Shedlosky returned the ball to the 20-yard line. Notre Dame's defense forced a punt. Arnold Greene's punt landed on the Pitt 40-yard line and rolled backward to the 21-yard line. Five running plays produced Notre Dame's first touchdown against the Panthers in four years. Shakespeare ran through left tackle from the 4-yard line for the score. Wally Fromhart's point after was blocked. The halftime score read 6 to 6. The second half turned into a punting duel. Late in the game, Shakespeare punted to the Panthers on their 15-yard line. Two penalties and two losses moved the ball back to the Pitt 3-yard line. John Wood punted and the Irish gained possession on the Panther 34-yard line. The Irish offense managed to advance the ball to the 20-yard line before the Panther defense stiffened. On fourth down, Marty Peters, with Fromhart holding, booted a 26-yard field goal for the winning points.

The Pitt starting lineup for the game against Notre Dame was Frank Souchak (left end), Tony Matisi (left tackle), William Glassford (left guard), Nick Kliskey (center), Dante Dalle Tezze (right guard), Arthur Detzel (right tackle), Paul Shaw (right end), John Michelosen (quarterback), Hubert Randour (left halfback), Bobby LaRue (right halfback) and Frank Patrick (fullback). Substitutes appearing in the game for Pitt were Vincent Sites, Averell Daniell, Don Hensley, Luther Richards, George Delich, Arnold Greene, William Stapulis, Leon Shedlosky and John Wood.

Scoring summary

Quarter	Time	Drive			Team	Scoring information	Score	
Quarter	Time	Plays	Yards	TOP	Team	Scoring information	Pittsburgh	Notre Dame
2		12	48		Pittsburgh	Frank Patrick 2-yard touchdown run, Patrick kick no good	6	0
2		5	21		Notre Dame	William Shakespeare 5-yard touchdown run, Wally Fromhart kick no good	6	6
4		7	17		Notre Dame	25-yard field goal by Marty Peters	6	9
"TOP" = time of possession. For other American football terms, see Glossary of American football.							6	9

=== Penn State ===
Week 5: Penn State at Pitt

Team	1	2	3	4	Total
Penn State	0	0	0	0	0
• Pitt	0	0	3	6	9

- Date: October 26, 1935
- Location: Pitt Stadium
  Pittsburgh, PA
- Game start: 2:00 p.m.
- Game attendance: 18,000
- Game weather: cloudy and warm
- Referee: Russell Goodwin (W. & J.)

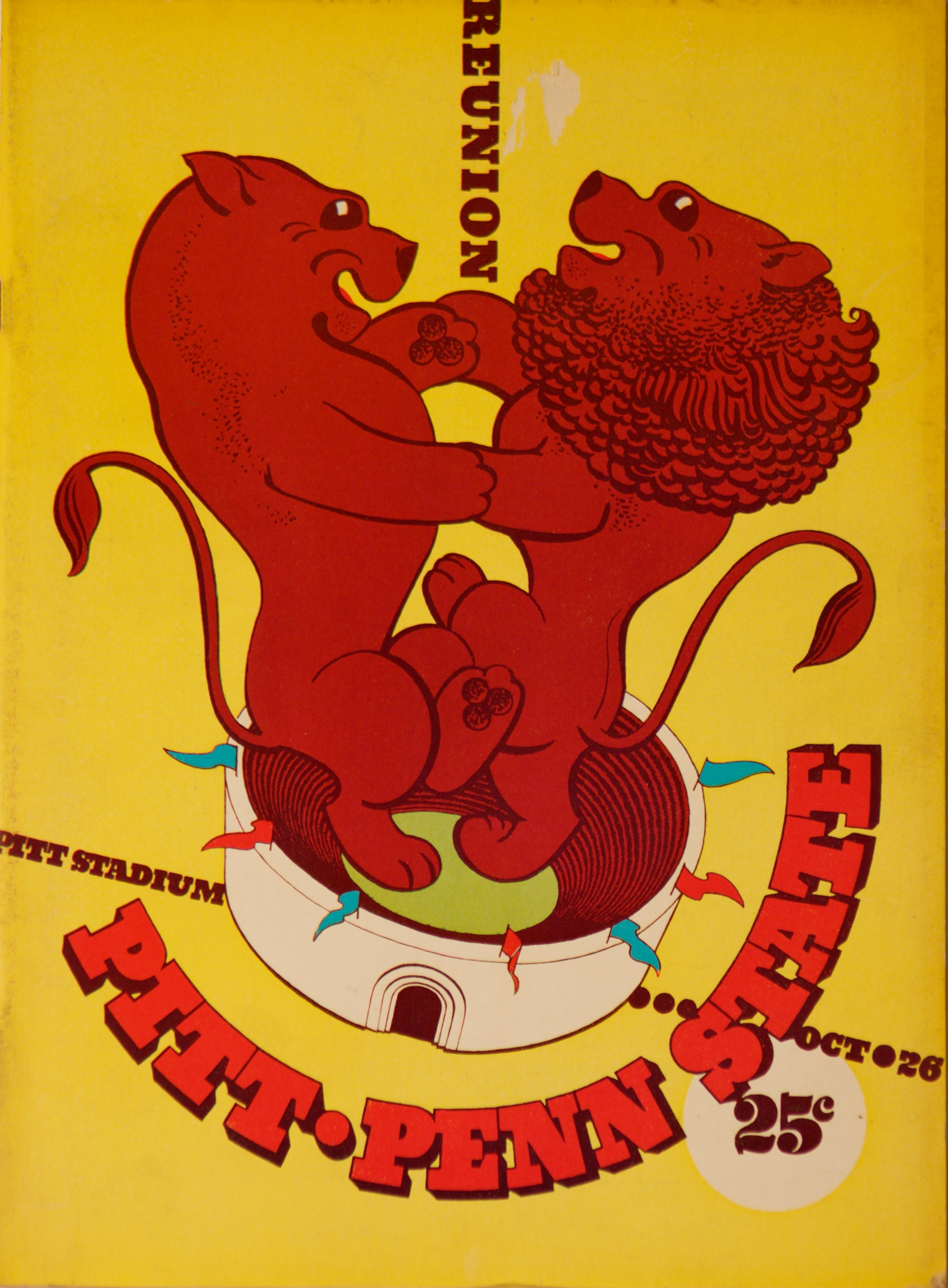
Program for October 26 game versus Penn State

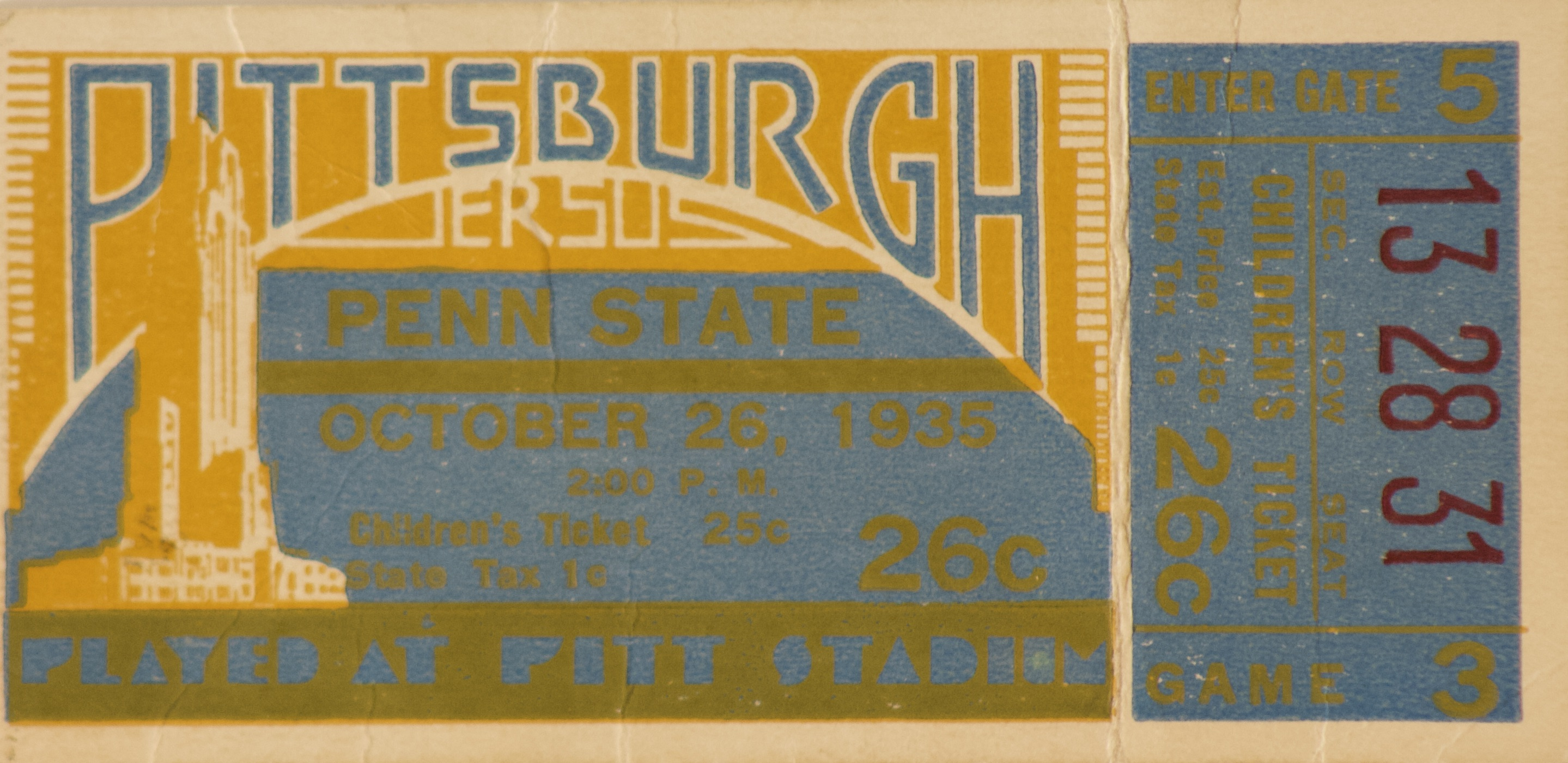
Ticket stub for October 26 game versus Penn State

On October 26, after a four year lapse, the Penn State Nittany Lions returned to Pitt Stadium to play the Panthers for the thirty-fifth time. Pitt led the series 20–12–2 and had not lost to the Lions since 1919, a stretch of 12 games. Sixth-year State coach Bob Higgins had a 14–24–3 record coming into the season. His present Lions were undefeated and had beaten Lebanon Valley (12–6), Western Maryland (2–0) and Lehigh (26–0).

Coach Sutherland penned: "In the East there will be a revival of a real old series when Pitt meets Penn State. My scouts tell me that the change at Penn State has been remarkable. Bob Higgins has the Lions winning, and has them thinking that they can continue to win against us. We're looking forward to a real battle, especially in view of the fact that we will be getting over that Notre Dame defeat. I think we can win but it ought to be close." Coach Sutherland adjusted the Panther starting lineup again. He inserted Frank Miller and Paul Shaw at the end positions and Don Hensley at center, while Arnold Greene, Leo Malarkey and Leon Shedlosky joined Frank Patrick in the backfield.

As Sutherland predicted the game was close, but Pitt managed to eke out a 9–0 victory. The Panthers gained 329 yards to the Lions 72 and earned 13 first downs to the Lions 5. The State defense, led by Johnny Economos, throttled the Panther offense when it mattered. In the opening period, the Pitt offense drove the ball to the State 7-yard line and lost the ball on downs. On their next possession, the Panther offense had the ball inside the State 20-yard line, and on fourth down had to settle for a Frank Patrick 27-yard field goal attempt that went wide. The Panther offense advanced the ball to the State 16-yard line early in the second quarter and lost the ball on downs. The State offense gained possession on the Panther 38-yard line on an interception of a Bobby LaRue pass by Thomas Silvano. The Panther defense regained possession on downs at the 29-yard line and Penn State never threatened to score again. Late in the third period, Patrick recovered a State fumble on the Lions 21-yard line. In four plays the Panthers advanced the ball to the 4-yard line. On third down Patrick dropped back to the 11-yard line and booted the field goal for the first points of the game. Pitt regained possession as quarterback John Michelosen intercepted Frank O'Hora's pass on the State 41-yard line. The scoring drive took eight plays with Patrick crashing over from the one to up the score to 9 to 0. The Panthers drove the ball to the State 16-yard line on their next possession and lost the ball on downs.

Coach Sutherland was not pleased: "I think Penn State played an awfully good game of football. They deserve more credit than we do. Naturally, I don't feel too well about the play of our team; it was extremely spotty. Penn State was decidedly the scrappier team. It was a very good defensive team. Give State all the credit she deserves."

The Pitt starting lineup for the game against Penn State was Frank Miller (left end), Tony Matisi (left tackle), William Glassford (left guard), Don Hensley (center), Dante Delle Tazze (right guard), Arthur Detzel (right tackle), Paul Shaw (right end), Arnold Greene (quarterback), Leo Malarkey (left halfback), Leon Shedlosky (right halfback) and Frank Patrick (fullback). Substitutes appearing in the game for Pittsburgh were Henry Adams, Averell Daniell, Marwood Stark, Nick Kliskey, Luther Richards, George Delich, Vincent Sites, John Michelosen, Robert McClure, Hubert Randour, John Urban, Bobby LaRue, John Wood, William Stapulis and John Dougert.

Scoring summary

Quarter	Time	Drive			Team	Scoring information	Score	
Quarter	Time	Plays	Yards	TOP	Team	Scoring information	Penn State	Pittsburgh
3		5	17		Pittsburgh	11-yard field goal by Frank Patrick	0	3
4		8	41		Pittsburgh	Patrick 1-yard touchdown run, Patrick kick no good	0	9
"TOP" = time of possession. For other American football terms, see Glossary of American football.							0	9

=== At Fordham ===
Week 6: Pittsburgh at Fordham

Team	1	2	3	4	Total
Pitt	0	0	0	0	0
Fordham	0	0	0	0	0

- Date: November 2, 1935
- Location: Polo Grounds
  New York, NY
- Game start: 2:00 p.m.
- Game attendance: 35,000
- Game weather: muddy field, clouds
- Referee: W. G. Crowell (Swarthmore)

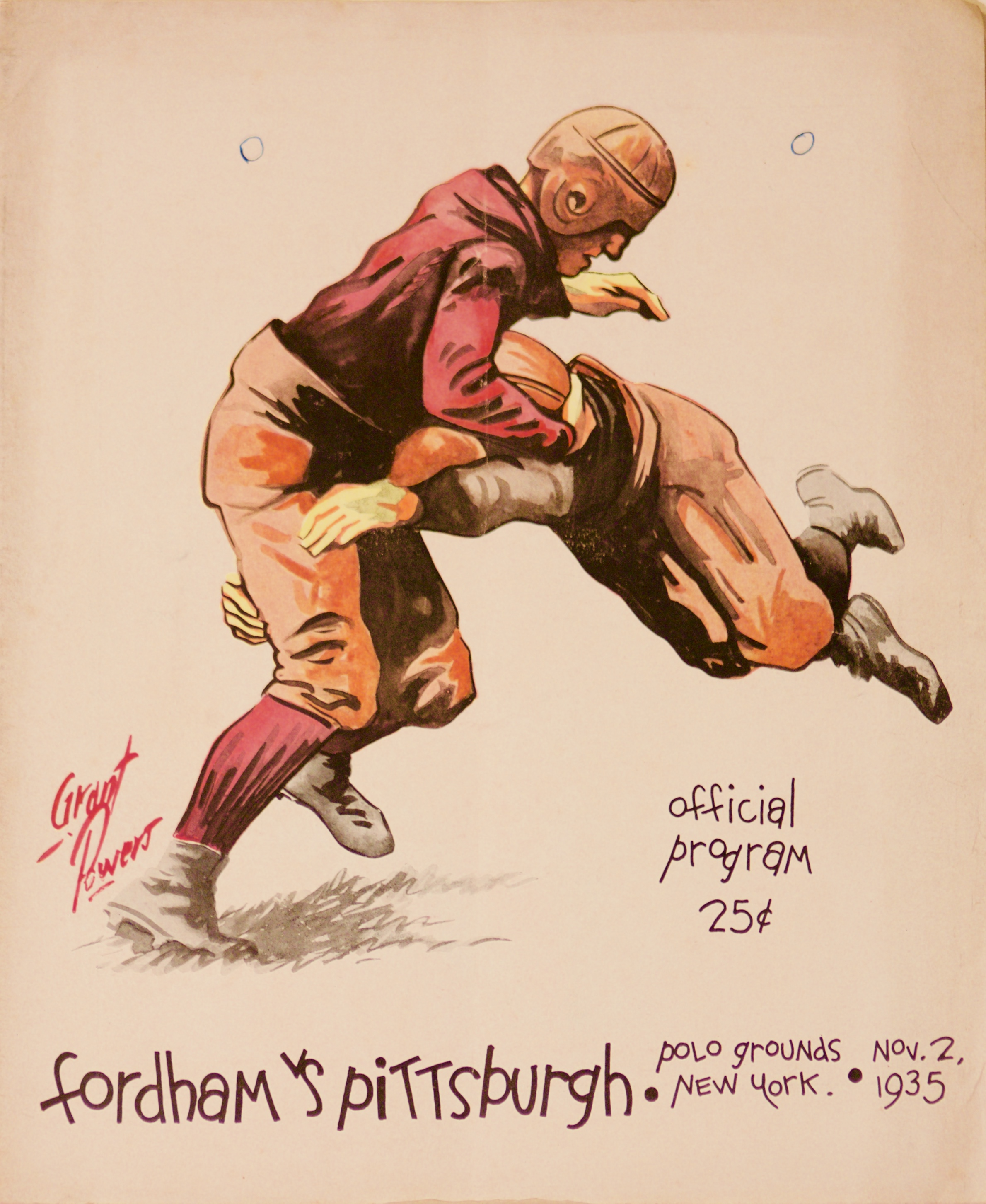
Program for the November 2 game versus Fordham

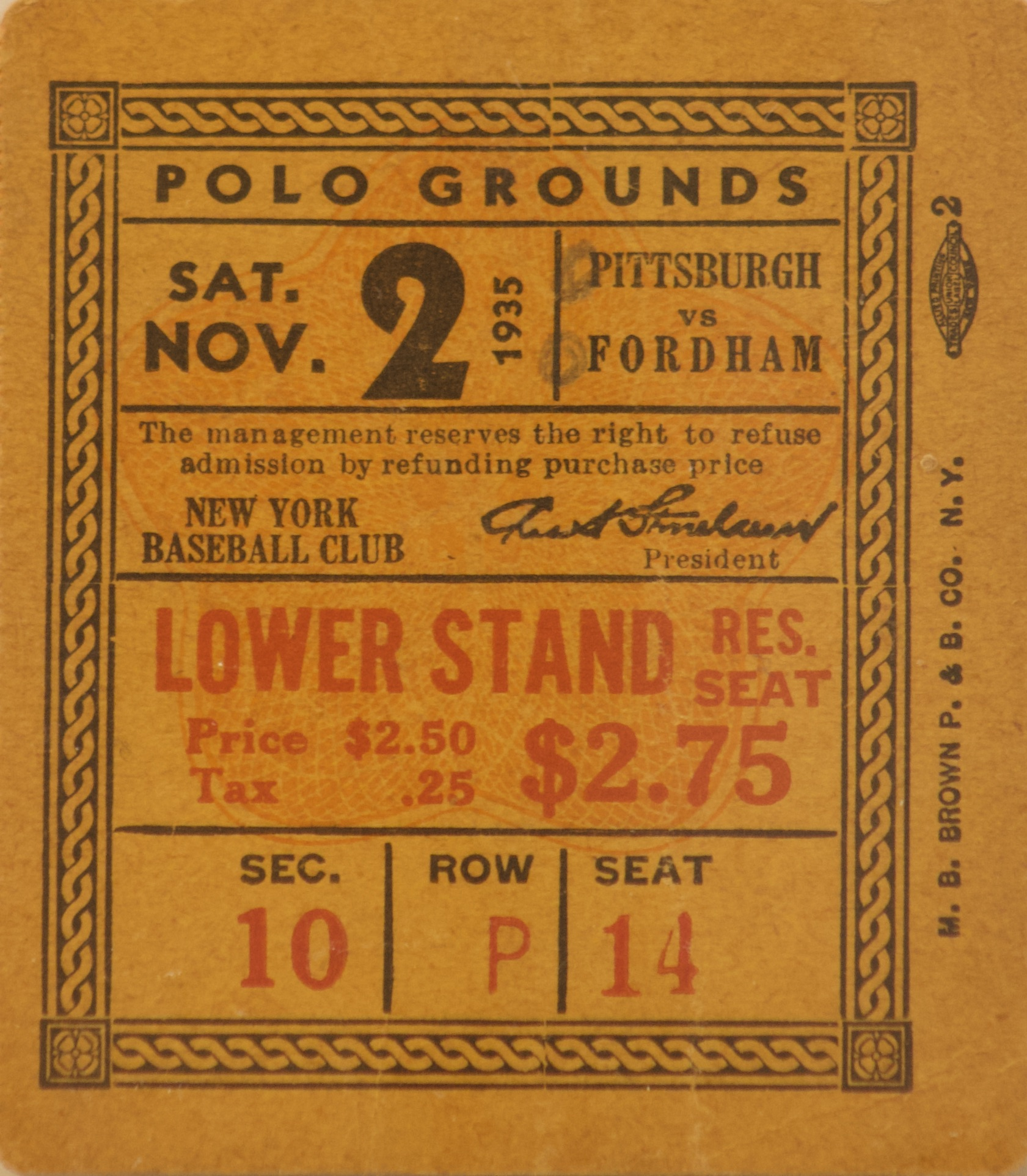
Ticket stub for November 2 game versus Fordham

The Panthers traveled to New York City's Polo Grounds on November 2 for their first encounter with the Fordham Rams. The Rams were led by fourth-year coach Jim Crowley, "first heard of as a rider among the Four Horsemen of Notre Dame," and had a record of 4–1. Crowley told Jess Carver of the Sun-Telegraph: "I have a dizzy ball club. One week we win by 20 to 0 and the next we lose by that much. What a team!" Mr. Carver reported that "the Crowley line is nothing over which to become excited." Crowley recruited well and his line turned out to be well-stocked with a number of future All-Americans and Football Hall of Famers – Alex Wojciechowicz, Ed Franco, Al Sarno, Al Babartsky, Nathaniel Pierce and Vince Lombardi. They were the forerunners of the famed "Seven Blocks of Granite" named in 1936.

Thirty-three members of the Panther squad arrived in New York on Friday morning. They were bussed to Rye, NY and quartered at the Westchester-Biltmore Country Club until game time. Pitt last played in New York City in 1923, when Pop Warner's final Pitt team lost (3–0) to Syracuse at Yankee Stadium. Coach Sutherland was wary of the Rams and wrote: "Pitt makes its first appearance in New York against Fordham, and the answer to this one is not yet written...The Rams have a powerful line, and we're still a long way from peak form. I wish I knew the right answer."

The Panthers and Rams slogged through the Polo Grounds' mud for four scoreless quarters in front of 35,000 fans. Fordham quarterback Andy Palau missed two field goals – one from the 25-yard line in the second quarter and the other from the 32-yard line in the final period. Pitt never came close to scoring. The 1936 Owl Yearbook summed it up best: "From the spectators point of view the Panther-Ram game was about as exciting as a game of solitaire. Neither team made a serious threat to score. Fordham reached the Pitt 18-yard line on one occasion. To keep invasions even the Panthers marched the ball to the Fordham 20. The tie marked the first time that Pitt has been held scoreless since 1928." Fordham finished the season with a 6–1–2 record.

The Pitt starting lineup for the game against Fordham was Vincent Sites (left end), Tony Matisi (left tackle), William Glassford (left guard), Nick Kliskey (center), Dante Dalle Tezze (right guard), Arthur Detzel (right tackle), Paul Shaw (right end), John Michelosen (quarterback), Hubert Randour (left halfback), Bobby LaRue (right halfback) and Frank Patrick (fullback). Substitutes appearing in the game for Pitt were Frank Souchak, James Scarfpin, Marwood Stark, George Delich, Frank Miller, Arnold Greene, Robert McClure, Leo Malarkey, Leon Shedlosky, John Wood and William Stapulis.

=== Army ===
Week 7: Army at Pitt

Team	1	2	3	4	Total
Army	0	0	0	6	6
• Pitt	3	0	7	19	29

- Date: November 9, 1935
- Location: Pitt Stadium
  Pittsburgh, PA
- Game start: 2:00 p.m.
- Game attendance: 68,000
- Game weather: sunny
- Referee: Dexter W. Very (Penn State)

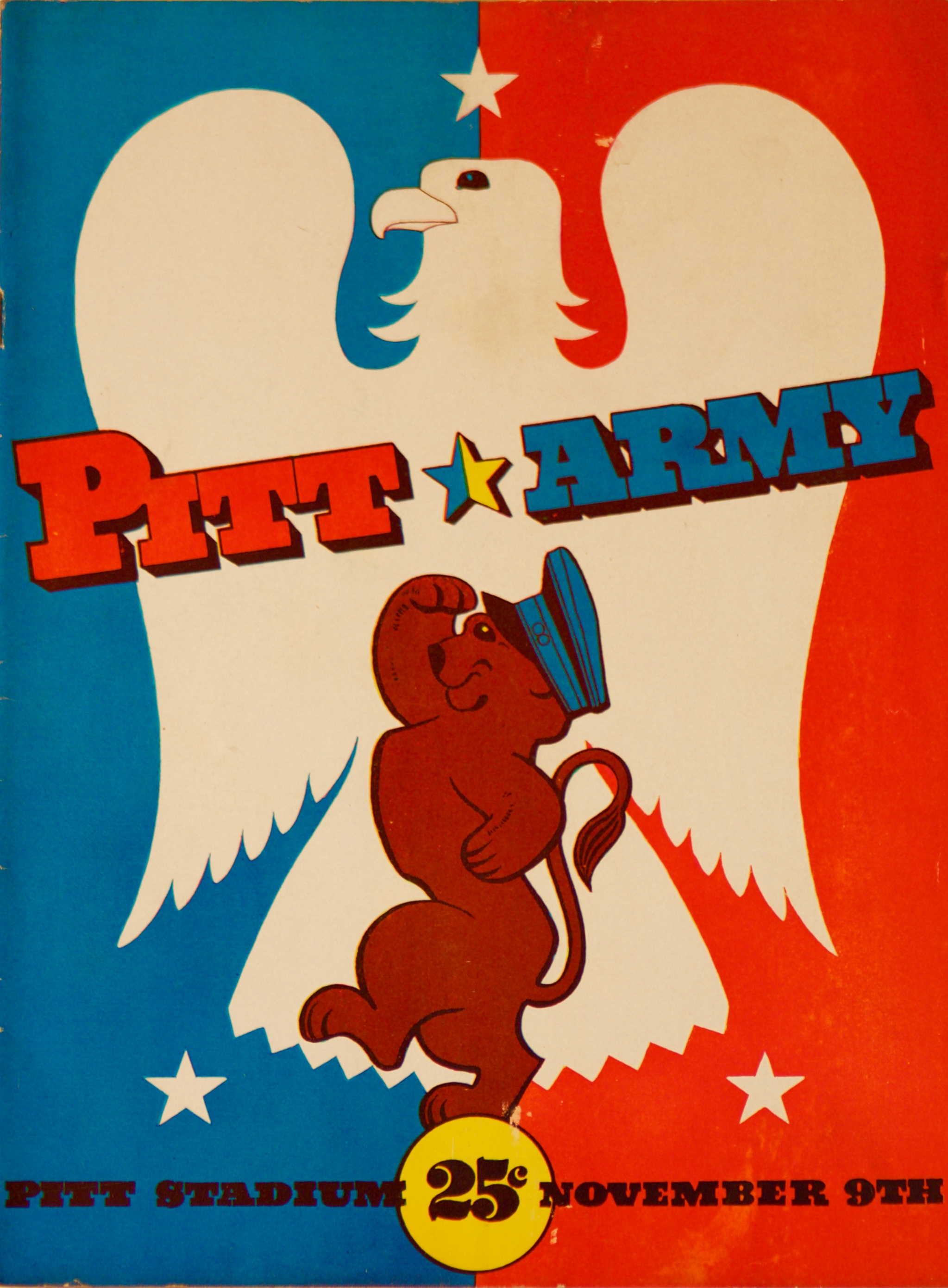
Program for November 9 game versus Army

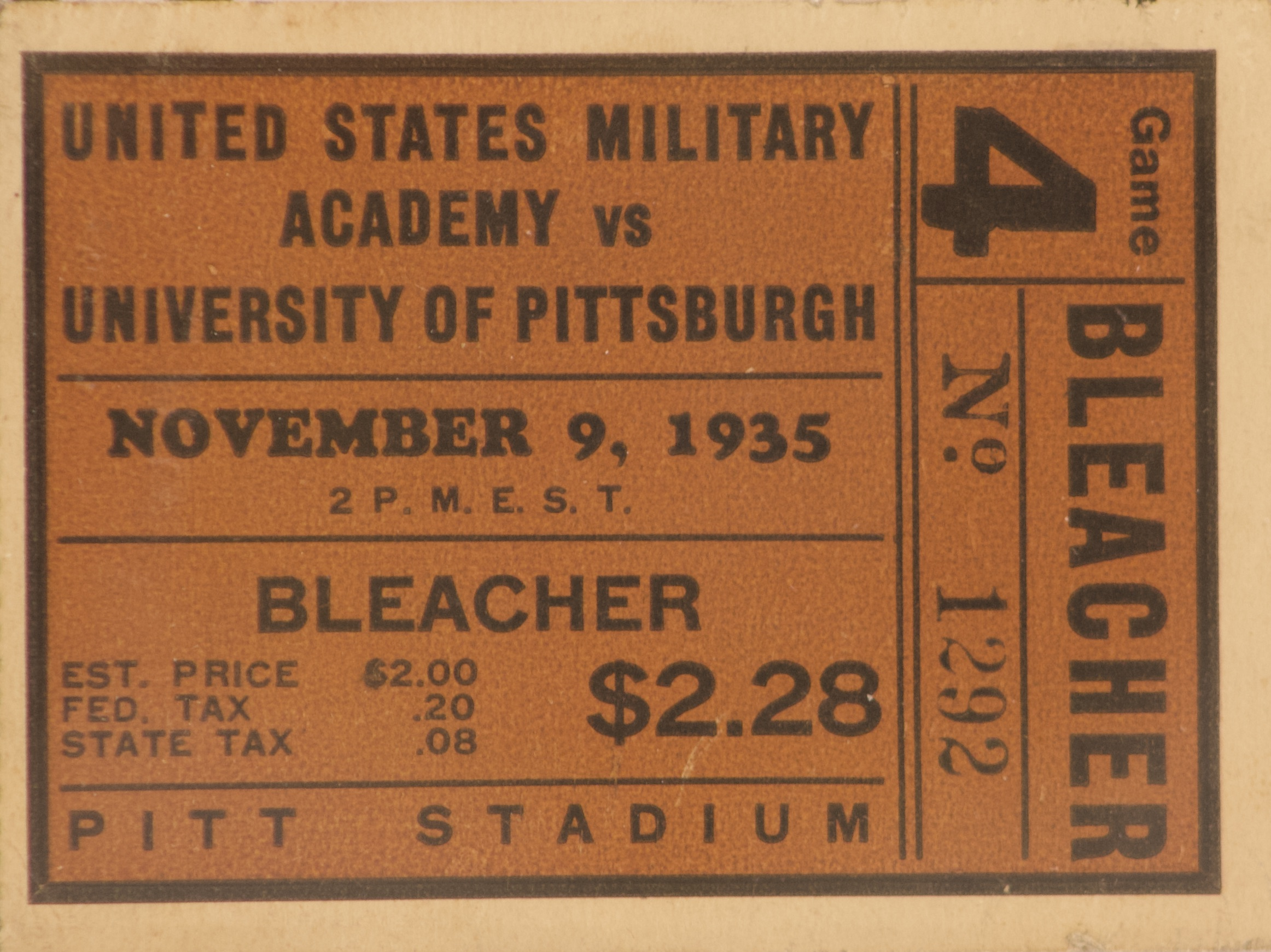
Ticket stub for November 9 game versus Army

The seventh game on the schedule pitted the Panthers against the Cadets of West Point. Pitt led the short series 2–0, having won 26–0 in 1931 at Pitt Stadium, and 18–13 in 1932 at West Point. Army was now led by former Cadet Garrison H. Davidson, who was in his third year and had a record of 16–4. His present team won their first 4 games easily and then lost 13–7 at home to Mississippi State. The two Army All-America candidates – end William Shuler and halfback "Monk" Meyer were both injured in the MSU game. Shuler would not play and Meyer would see limited action. The Cadets arrived in town Friday morning and quartered at Shady Side Academy until game time.

On Saturday morning the entire Corps of Cadets (1600 strong) arrived in Pittsburgh. After receiving lunch at the Syria Mosque, the soldiers lined up and marched into the Stadium and entertained the fans with their pregame drill. In the evening the West Pointers were feted with a military ball at the William Penn Hotel. Proceeds from the ball went to the Disabled War Veterans Fund.

Doctor Sutherland told the Sun-Telegraph: "You ask what I think about the game? Well, all I can say is that we've tried to have the boys ready. They should go, they are in good physical trim and by this time, after hard games with Notre Dame and Fordham, they certainly should click. This team has me guessing, but I think they'll be ready tomorrow."

With a near capacity 68,000 fans in attendance, the Panthers started slowly but finished strong and beat a good Army eleven 29 to 6. In the first period the Panther offense moved the ball to the Army 25-yard line and Frank Patrick kicked a 31-yard field goal to open the scoring. The rest of the half was a punting duel with no more scoring. Pitt halfback Bobby LaRue scored three touchdowns in the second half. The first was an 8-yard run late in the third quarter to extend the lead to 10–0, as Patrick's point after was successful. The fourth stanza was full of action. Army answered LaRue's score with a 65-yard drive that ended with an 11-yard touchdown pass from "Monk" Meyer to Clinton True, trimming the Panther lead to 10–6. The Panthers received the kick-off and on the fourth play LaRue took the ball on a reverse for 75 yards and his second touchdown. Patrick added the placement and Pitt led 17 to 6. Pitt back Hubert Randour intercepted Meyer's first down pass on the Army 27-yard line. LaRue scored from the 22-yard line and Pitt led 23–6. Sutherland put in the third string and John Wood threw a 38-yard touchdown pass to end Paul Shaw for the game's final score. The Army finished the season with a 6–2–1 record.

Coach Davidson was gracious in defeat: "Up at Point we consider your Pitt coach the best in the game. His teams always know more football than the others we play. We had thought we'd win this one, but at that we weren't surprised when he showed up with a gang that was clicking."

The Pitt starting lineup for the game against Army was Frank Souchak (left end), Averell Daniell (left tackle), William Glassford (left guard), Nick Kliskey (center), Dante Dalle Tezze (right guard), Arthur Detzel (right tackle), Vincent Sites (right end), John Michelosen (quarterback), Hubert Randour (left halfback), Bobby LaRue (right halfback) and Frank Patrick (fullback). Substitutes appearing in the game for Pitt were Paul Shaw, Frank Miller, George Delich, Tony Matisi, James Scarfpin, Ted Schmidt, Marwood Stark, Luther Richards, Leon Wohlgemuth, George Yocos, Albert Walton, Don Hensley, Henry Adams, Arnold Greene, Robert McClure, Leon Shedlosky, Leo Malarkey, John Wood, John Urban, Richard Noble, William Stapulis, Leonard Rector and John Dougert.

Scoring summary

Quarter	Time	Drive			Team	Scoring information	Score	
Quarter	Time	Plays	Yards	TOP	Team	Scoring information	Army	Pittsburgh
1		7	25		Pittsburgh	31-yard field goal by Frank Patrick	0	3
3		16	82		Pittsburgh	Bobby LaRue 8-yard touchdown run, Patrick kick good	0	10
4		9	65		Army	Clinton True 11-yard touchdown reception from Charles Meyer, Edward Grove kick no good	6	10
4		4	67		Pittsburgh	Bobby LaRue 75-yard touchdown run, Patrick kick good	6	17
4		5	27		Pittsburgh	Bobby LaRue 22-yard touchdown run, Patrick kick no good	6	23
4		6	53		Pittsburgh	Paul Shaw 38-yard touchdown reception from John Wood, Leo Rector kick no good	6	29
"TOP" = time of possession. For other American football terms, see Glossary of American football.							6	29

=== Nebraska ===
Week 8: Nebraska at Pitt

Team	1	2	3	4	Total
Nebraska	0	0	0	0	0
• Pitt	0	6	0	0	6

- Date: November 16, 1935
- Location: Pitt Stadium
  Pittsburgh, PA
- Game start: 2:00 p.m.
- Game attendance: 30,000
- Game weather: cold and cloudy
- Referee: E. A. Gieges (Temple)

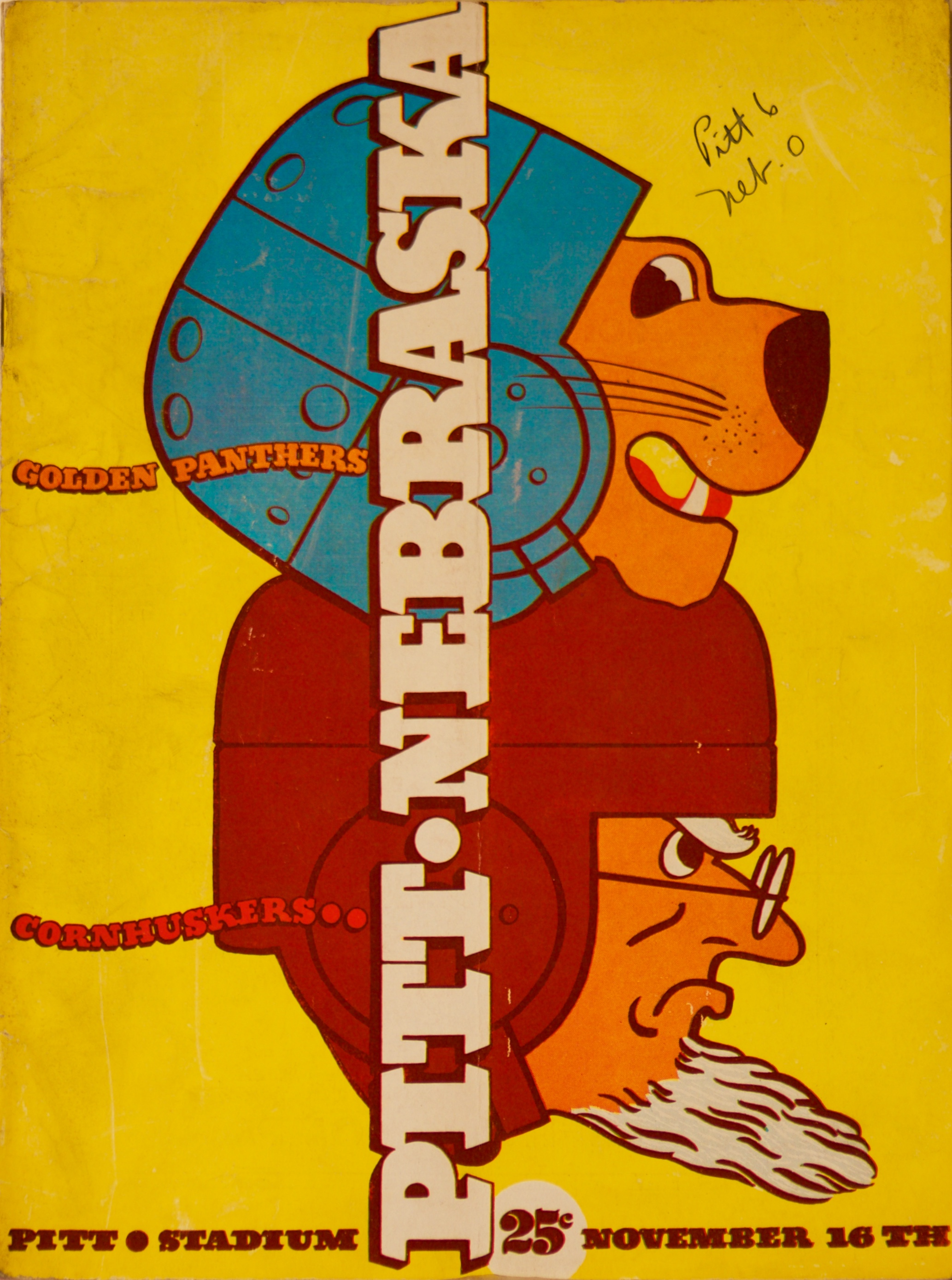
Program for November 16 game versus Nebraska

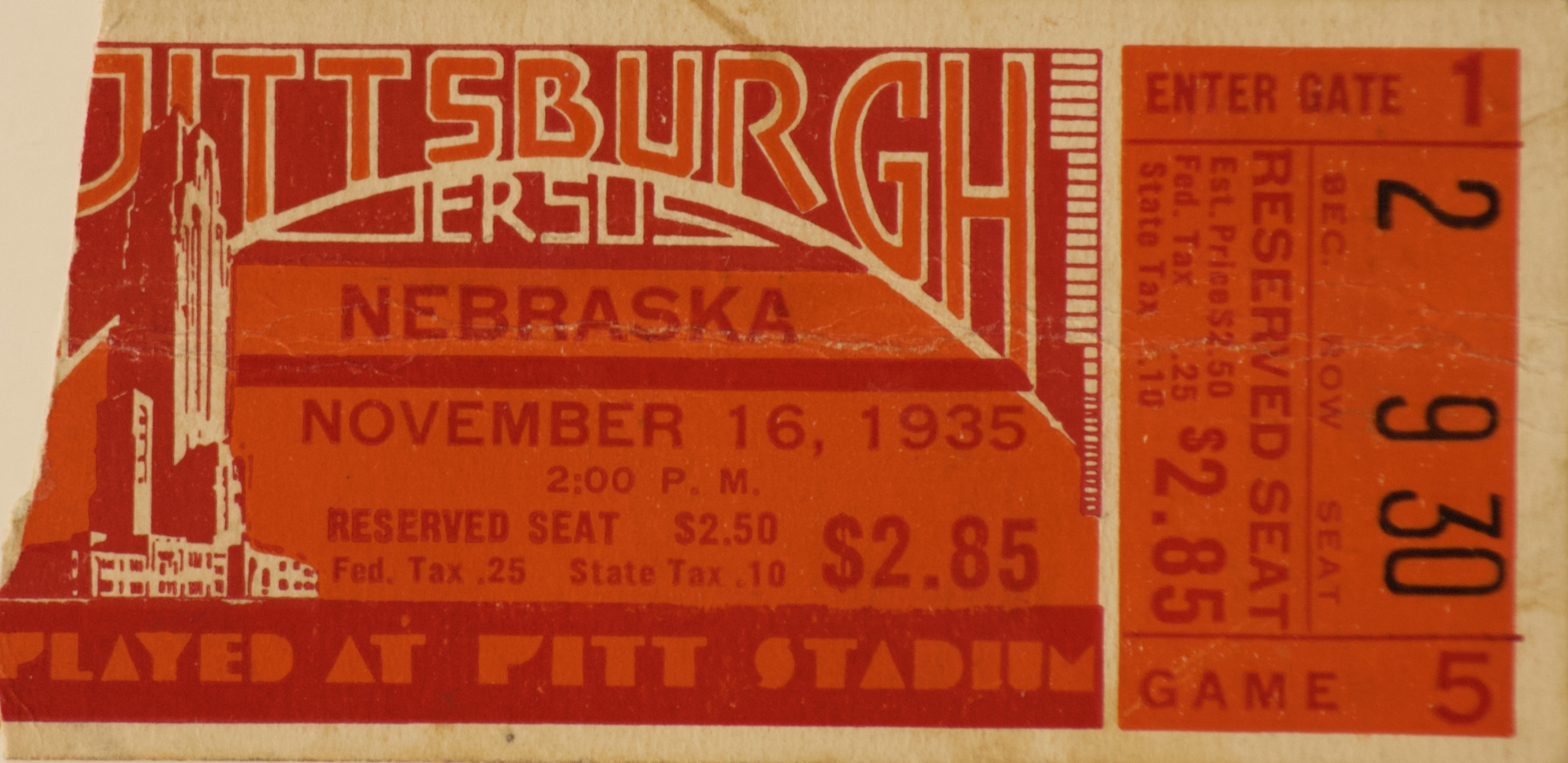
Ticket stub for November 16 game versus Nebraska

On November 16, the Nebraska Cornhuskers came east for the fifth time to play the Panthers at Pitt Stadium. Seventh-year coach Dana X. Bible sought his first victory over the Panthers and Jock Sutherland. In 1921 Nebraska came to Pittsburgh and beat Pop Warner's Panthers 10 to 0. Since Dr. Sutherland became coach, the Panthers and Huskers played eight times and Pitt had not lost (5–0–3). Nebraska came into the game with the same 5–1–1 record as the Panthers. They already clinched the Big 6 Conference title with a 4–0–1 record. Out of conference they beat Chicago (28–7) and lost to Minnesota (12–7). The Huskers boarded the train Wednesday evening and arrived in Chicago Thursday morning. They enjoyed some sight-seeing and practiced on Soldier Field before the overnight train ride into Pittsburgh. The Huskers were housed at Shady Side Academy. After the game the team attended a downtown show prior to their overnight train ride back to Chicago. On Sunday they were spectators at Wrigley Field for the Chicago Bears versus New York Giants pro football game.

The Panthers came through the Army game with no injuries, so Jock Sutherland started the same group for this contest. Sutherland wrote in The Pittsburgh Press: "Nebraska is moving along like a champion, and has its greatest chance since 1928 of beating Pittsburgh."

The Panthers continued their mastery over the Cornhuskers when Frank Patrick plunged into the end zone from 1-yard out in the second quarter for the only score of the game. The point after was missed and Pitt came away with a 6–0 victory. The Panther offense drove 48 yards in 10 plays for the score. The rest of the game was played between the 20 yard lines. The punting of the Huskers fullback, Sam Francis, kept the Panthers offense starting deep in their own territory the remainder of the game. Nebraska made a futile effort to tie or win the game late in the fourth quarter with their aerial game, but the Pitt defense intercepted a pass and then held the Huskers on downs on the Pitt 34-yard line to seal the victory. The Pitt offense gained 218 total yards and earned 12 first downs, while their defense held the Huskers to 79 yards and 4 first downs.

Coach Bible was impressed with the line play: "It was a wonderful fight from the start to finish between two evenly matched teams, especially as regards defensive play. The line play on both sides was marvelous." Coach Sutherland added: "I have no hesitancy in saying that this was our toughest game of the year, and we have had several fierce fights. The line play on both sides was terrific and while we were able to score a touchdown, I want to state there was not a minute when I didn't fear a touchdown on the part of one of those star backfield men in the Husker lineup."

The Pitt starting lineup for the game against Nebraska was Frank Souchak (left end), Averell Daniell (left tackle), William Glassford (left guard), Nick Kliskey (center), Dante Dalle Tezze (right guard), Arthur Detzel (right tackle), Vincent Sites (right end), John Michelosen (quarterback), Hubert Randour (left halfback), Bobby LaRue (right halfback) and Frank Patrick (fullback). Substitutes appearing in the game for Pitt were Luther Richards, Paul Shaw, Leon Shedlosky and William Stapulis.

Scoring summary

Quarter	Time	Drive			Team	Scoring information	Score	
Quarter	Time	Plays	Yards	TOP	Team	Scoring information	Nebraska	Pittsburgh
2		10	48		Pittsburgh	Frank Patrick 1-yard touchdown run, Patrick kick no good	0	6
"TOP" = time of possession. For other American football terms, see Glossary of American football.							0	6

=== Carnegie Tech ===
Week 9: Carnegie Tech at Pitt

Team	1	2	3	4	Total
Carnegie Tech	0	0	0	0	0
Pitt	0	0	0	0	0

- Date: November 28, 1935
- Location: Pitt Stadium
  Pittsburgh, PA
- Game start: 2:00 p.m.
- Game attendance: 25,000
- Game weather: wet turf, partly cloudy
- Referee: W. G. Crowell (Swarthmore)

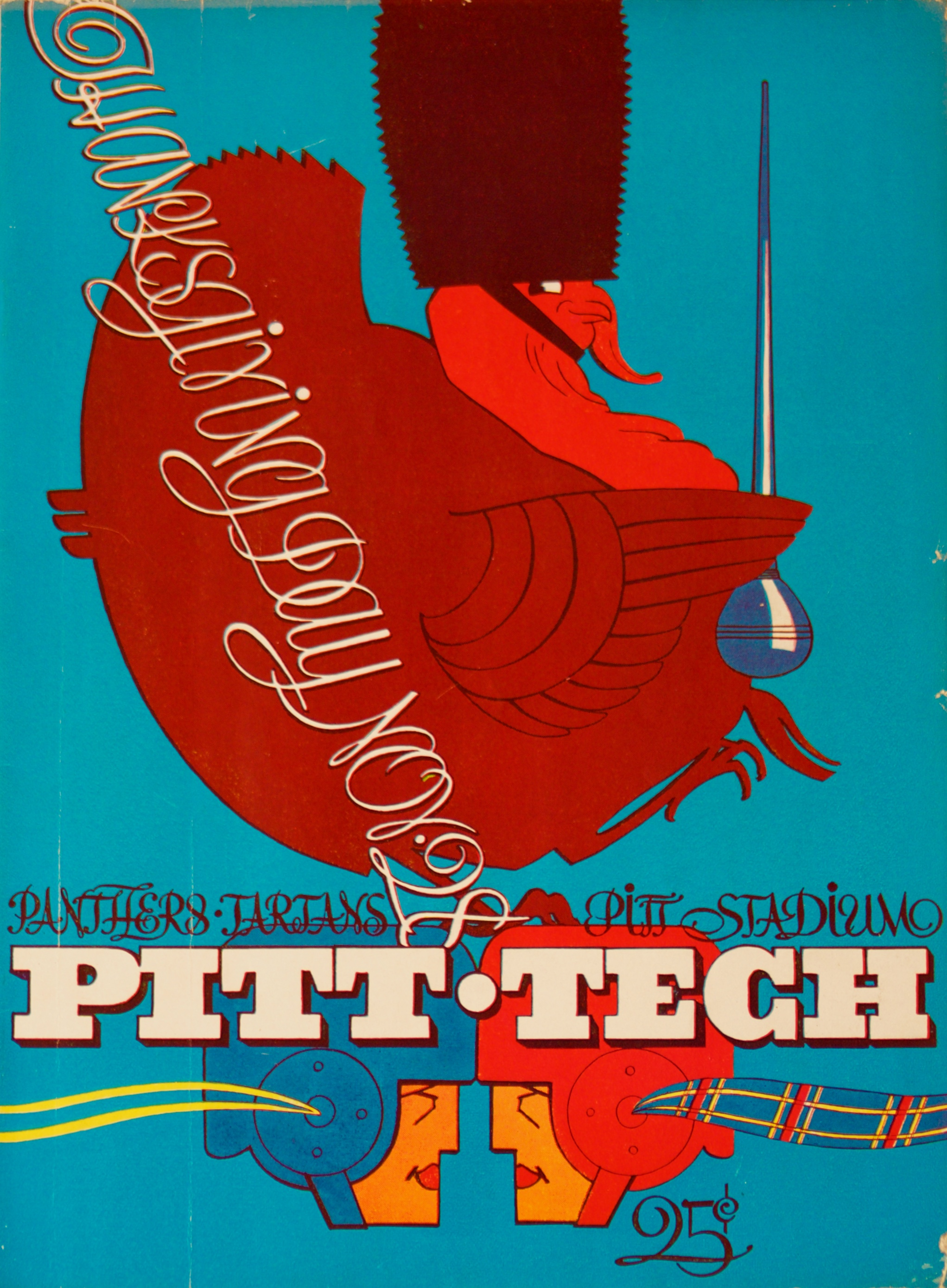
Program for the November 28 game versus Carnegie Tech

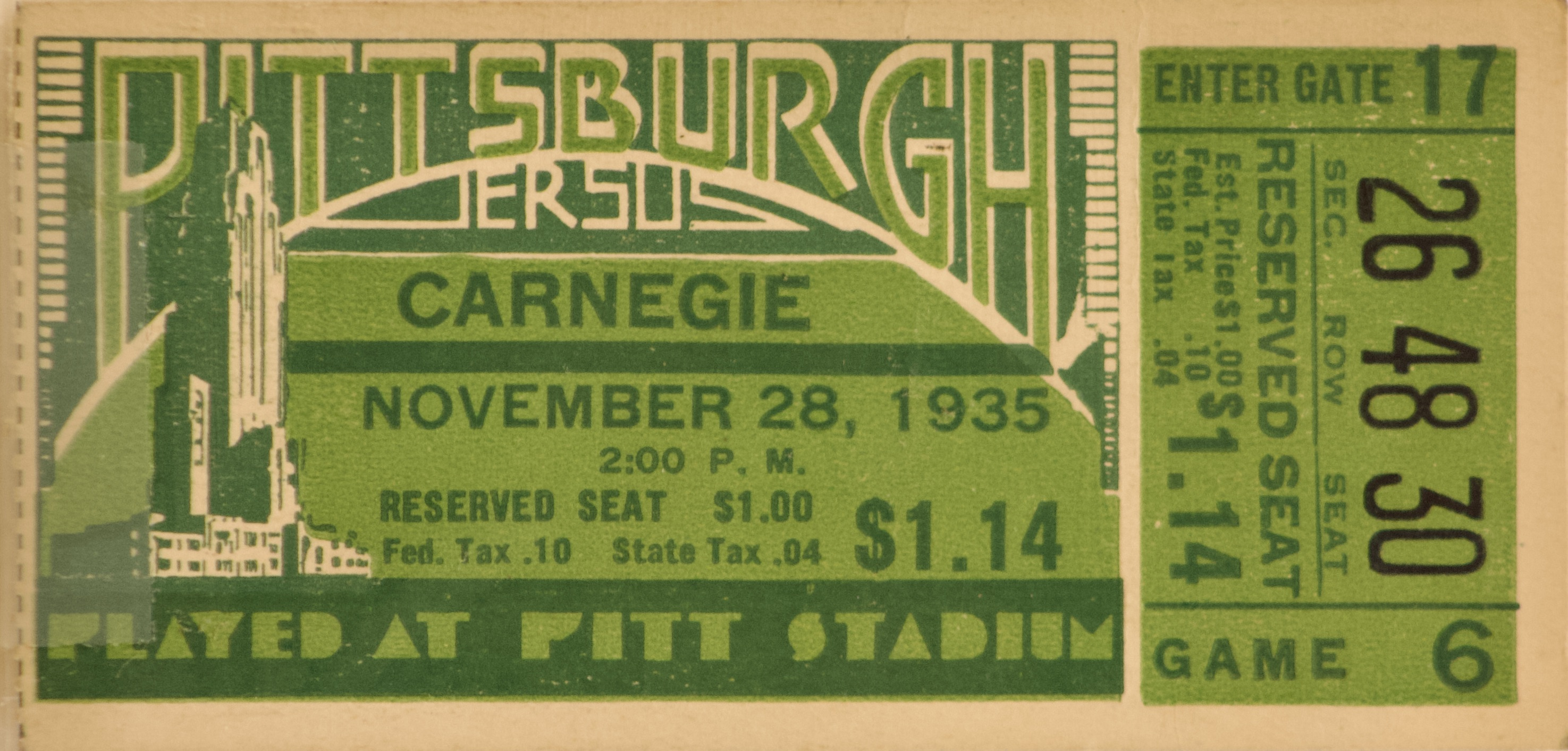
Ticket stub for November 28 game versus Carnegie Tech

The Panthers were heavy favorites for their Thanksgiving Day game with Carnegie Tech. The Tartans were only 2–5 on the season and had not beaten Pitt since their third-year coach, Howard Harpster, led them to a 6–0 victory in 1928. Pitt led the all-time series 17–4.

The Tartans were healthy and "the Plaid always tries just a bit harder against Pitt than any other opponent."

Coach Sutherland used the same starting lineup that beat Army and Nebraska. Eleven Panther seniors were playing their last game at Pitt Stadium – Vincent Sites, Nick Kliskey, Hubert Randour, Art Detzel, Leon Shedlosky, Marwood Stark, Leon Wohlgemuth, Leonard Rector, Art Schindel, Earl McCue and Dick Noble. Sutherland named Nick Kliskey captain for the final two games at the request of the team.

On a muddy field in front of 25,000 fans, the underdog Carnegie Tech Tartans held the Pitt Panthers to a scoreless tie, which handed the Duquesne Dukes, who beat Tech 7 to 0, their first City Championship. The Panthers gained 183 yards and earned 13 first downs. But they got no closer than the Tech 5-yard line once in the second quarter, where Frank Patrick's 14-yard field goal try went wide. The Tartans gained 80 yards and earned only 2 first downs but attempted 3 field goals. The first try was late in the first half, after Tech back Gene Rosenthal intercepted a Pitt pass and ran the ball to the Pitt 20-yard line. The Pitt defense held and Tech quarterback Charles Spisak's 30-yard field goal went wide right. Early in the last period the Panthers fumbled and Tech recovered on the Pitt 24-yard line. The Tartans were only able to advance the ball to the 19-yard line. On fourth down Spisak's field goal attempt was wide left from the 26-yard line. With 30 seconds left on the clock, Nestor Henrion attempted a 40-yard field goal that was short.

Coach Harpster was ecstatic: "I was very well satisfied with the result, considering that few gave us a chance to do anything but hold Pitt to a low score. We had had a lot of rest and we were right, physically and mentally...I am a happy man."

Dr. Jock Sutherland commented that the Carnegie Tech team played great football: "They were in an ideal spot and they made the most of it. They were in an ideal spot because of what had gone before. The Tartans were able to get up to their peak of the season. I'm afraid our boys were unable to get 'up.' That is a natural thing. I was impressed particularly by Spisak's punting."

The Pitt starting lineup for the Carnegie Tech game was Frank Souchak (left end), Averell Daniell (left tackle), William Glassford (left guard), Nick Kliskey (center), Dante Dalle Tezze (right guard), Arthur Detzel (right tackle), Vincent Sites (right end), John Michelosen (quarterback), Hubert Randour (left halfback), Bobby LaRue (right halfback) and Frank Patrick (fullback). Substitutes appearing in the game for Pitt were Frank Miller, Tony Matisi, Luther Richards, Don Hensley, Marwood Stark, George Delich, Paul Shaw, Arnold Greene, Leo Malarkey, Leon Shedlosky and William Stapulis.

=== At USC ===
Week 10: Pittsburgh at USC

Team	1	2	3	4	Total
• Pitt	6	0	6	0	12
USC	0	0	0	7	7

- Date: December 14, 1935
- Location: Los Angeles Memorial Coliseum
  Los Angeles, CA
- Game start: 2:00 p.m.
- Game attendance: 30,000–35,000
- Game weather: sunny
- Referee: Tom Louttit (Oregon State)

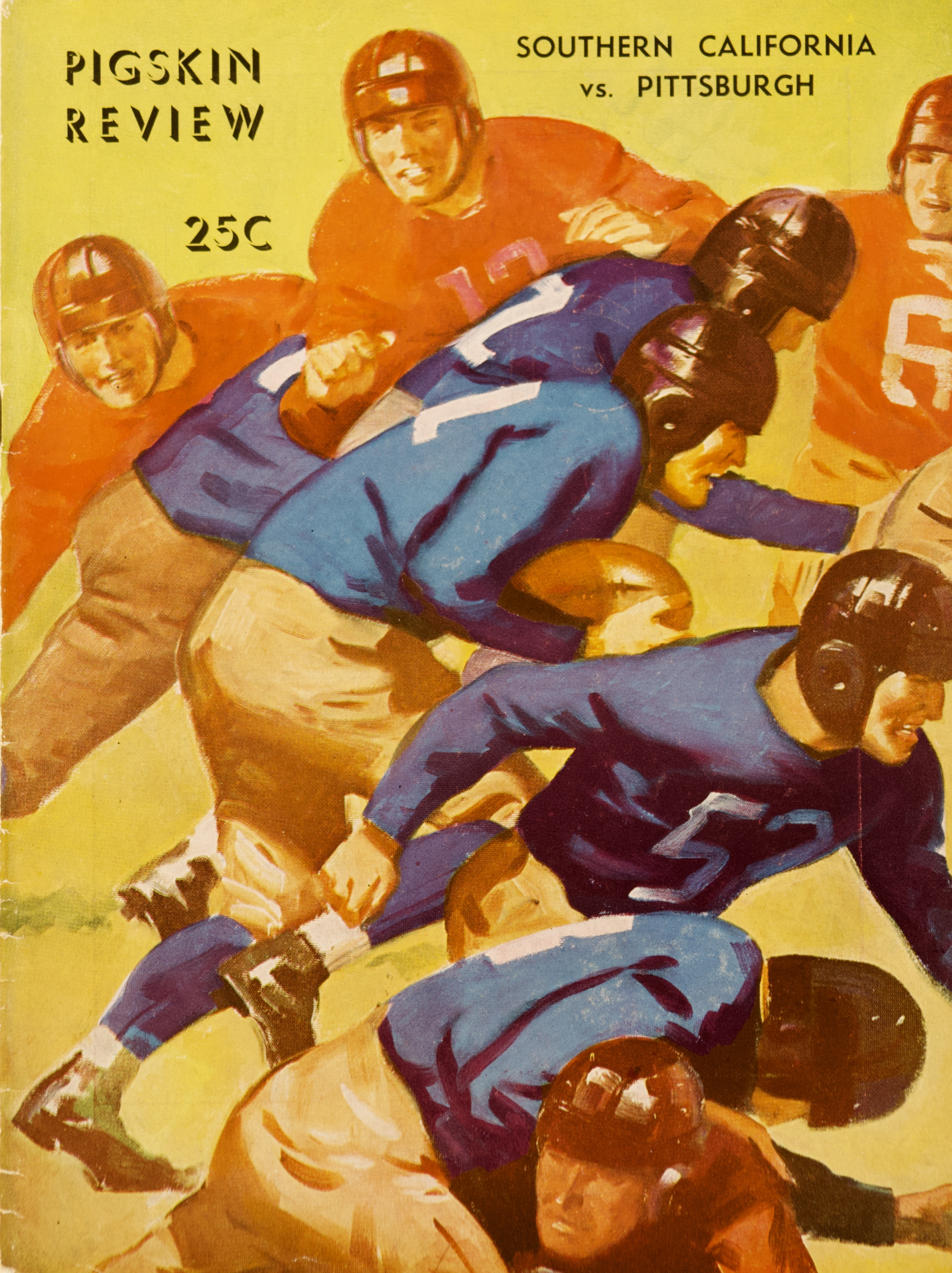
Program for December 14 game versus USC

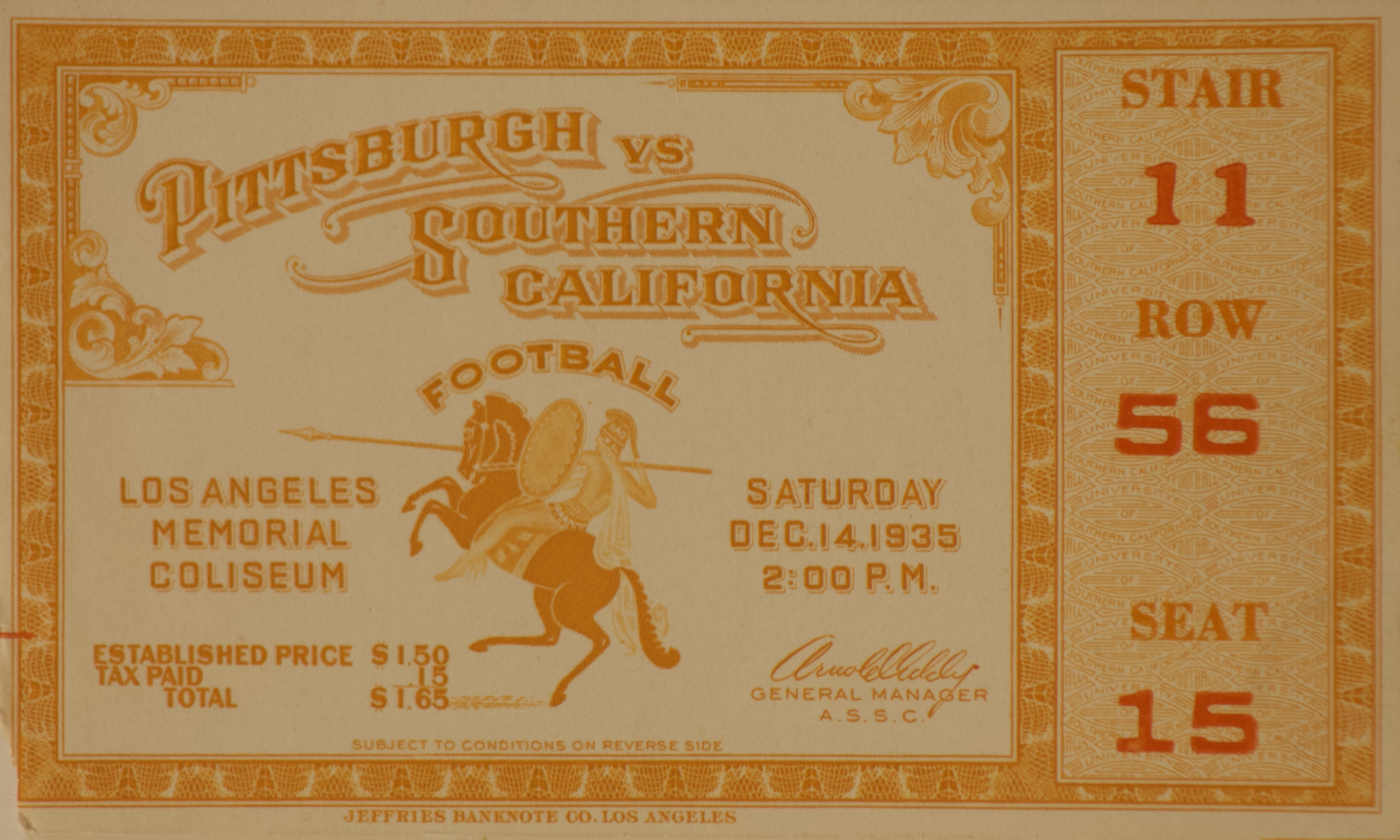
Stub for the December 14 game versus USC

The Panthers traveled to Los Angeles, CA to play the Southern Cal Trojans in the final game of the 1935 season. The Panthers did not fare well in two previous trips to the west coast to take on USC, losing in both the 1930 (47–14) and 1933 (35–0) Rose Bowls. Pitt gained a bit of revenge with a 20–6 victory over the Trojans last season in Pittsburgh. Thirty-three members of the Pitt team made the trip west. The train departed for St. Louis at 3 p.m. on Saturday, December 7. On Sunday they traveled to El Paso, Texas, where they enjoyed a workout on Monday morning. On Tuesday they arrived in Colton, California and were quartered at the Lake Narconian Club. On Saturday morning the team was bused 45 miles to the stadium. Sutherland spoke with the Los Angeles Times: "I think our boys still have some good football left in them and if we can just get the kinks out of their system in the next few days maybe they'll do their stuff on Saturday."

Coach Howard Jones' Trojans were 3–6 on the season and would finish with a sub-.500 record for the second year in a row. Jones was displeased with how his lineup performed in their previous game and decided to rely on sophomores against the Panthers.

Bill Henry of the L. A. Times reported: "Pittsburgh's 12–to–7 victory over the Trojans may, on paper, look as though it might have been a very exciting afternoon out at the Coliseum yesterday. Nothing could be further from the truth. Even the fact that the Trojans waited until the last thirty seconds of the game to score their touchdown and thus take some of the sting from their most disastrous season couldn't make the 30,000 customers feel that the afternoon wouldn't have been better spent reading a good book. It was just that dull!"

Early in the game, Panther end, Frank Souchak, intercepted a Trojan pass and ran 42 yards to the USC 15-yard line. He lateraled the ball to Paul Shaw, who proceeded to fumble on the 9-yard line. Souchak, trailing the play, recovered for the Panthers. On fourth down fullback Frank Patrick went over right guard from the one for the touchdown. Patrick missed the point after. In the third quarter the Panther offense advanced the ball 81 yards in eight plays for their second touchdown. Hubert Randour scored on a 7-yard scamper through right tackle. Randour led the team in rushing for the season, but this was his only touchdown. The extra point was blocked. Late in the fourth quarter the Trojan offense gained possession on the Pitt 33-yard line. They moved the ball to the 1-yard line in 5 plays. Five plays later, the Pitt offense regained possession on downs on the 2-yard line. Pitt punted to the Trojans on the 36-yard line. On third down David Davis completed a 41-yard touchdown pass to Bill Gaisford with 30 seconds left on the clock. Trojan halfback James Sutherland added the point after and the final score read: Pitt 12 to USC 7. The Trojans finished the season with a 5–7 record.

Coach Sutherland was happy: "I thought we played close to perfect defensive football. I think any coach would be proud of the stand those kids made on the goal line. Aside from that they weren't fooled anywhere on the field...Offensively we looked good in spots, except for errors of commission. Need I say that I'm happy."

The Panthers celebrated by dining at the Cocoanut Grove,(“where only the best of the celebrities dance and dine.”). On Sunday and Monday they toured Pasadena, San Pedro, Long Beach and Beverly Hills. On Tuesday, on their way back east, they stopped to view the Grand Canyon and on Wednesday they toured Indian villages and prehistoric remains in Santa Fe, New Mexico.

The Pitt starting lineup for the game against USC was Frank Souchak (left end), Tony Matisi (left tackle), William Glassford (left guard), Nick Kliskey (center), Dante Dalle Tezze (right guard), Arthur Detzel (right tackle), Paul Shaw (right end), John Michelosen (quarterback), Bobby LaRue (left halfback), Hubert Randour (right halfback) and Frank Patrick (fullback). Substitutes appearing in the game for Pitt were Frank Miller, Averell Daniell, Marwood Stark, Frank Walton, Don Hensley, Luther Richards, George Delich, Vincent Sites, Arnold Greene, Leon Shedlosky, Leo Malarkey and John Dougert.

Scoring summary

Quarter	Time	Drive			Team	Scoring information	Score	
Quarter	Time	Plays	Yards	TOP	Team	Scoring information	Pittsburgh	USC
1		4	9		Pittsburgh	Frank Patrick 1-yard touchdown run, Patrick kick no good	6	0
3		8	81		Pittsburgh	Hubert Randour 7-yard touchdown run, Patrick kick blocked by Beatty	12	0
4		3	36		USC	William Gaisford 41-yard touchdown reception from David Davis, James Sutherland kick good	12	7
"TOP" = time of possession. For other American football terms, see Glossary of American football.							12	7

== Individual scoring summary ==
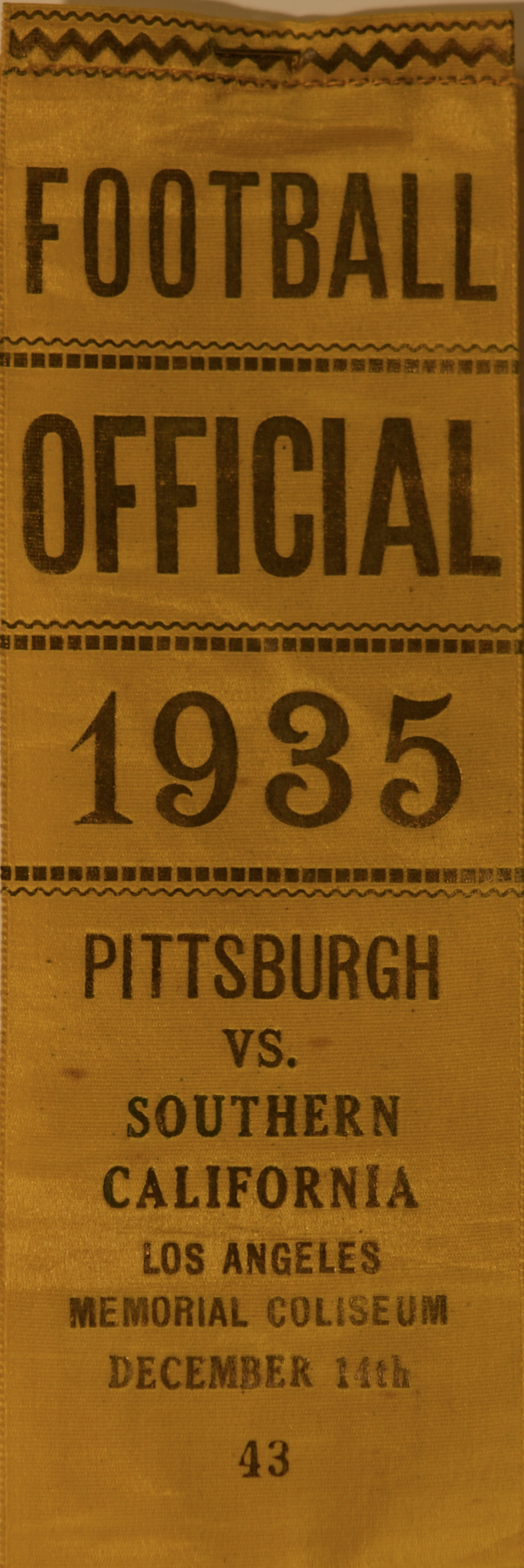
Official's Badge for the December 14, 1935 USC versus Pitt football game

1935 Pittsburgh Panthers scoring summary
Player	Touchdowns	Extra points	Field goals	Safety	Points
Frank Patrick	9	7	4	0	73
Robert LaRue	5	0	0	0	30
Leonard Rector	1	1	0	0	7
John Wood	1	0	0	0	6
Hub Randour	1	0	0	0	6
William Stapulis	1	0	0	0	6
Paul Shaw	1	0	0	0	6
Frank Souchak	0	1	0	0	1
Totals	19	9	4	0	135

== Postseason ==
Harry Scott wrote in Jock Sutherland: "Thus the curtain closed on still another successful season for Sutherland and the boys. They had won seven of their ten games and tied two, losing only to Notre Dame, and had been scored on by a mere four teams with a total of 28 points." Only three (Nick Kliskey, Hubert Randour and Art Detzel) of the eleven graduating seniors were starters, although they all contributed to the season's success. The Pitt booster organization called "The Golden Panthers" had the freshman team well-stocked so Sutherland would have a strong team for the next 2 to 3 years.

The freshman team coached by Walter Milligan finished the season with a 3–2 record. After losing to Carnegie Tech (3–0) and Kiski (12–6), they won their final three games – Penn State (6–0), West Virginia (18–0) and Navy (33–7).

The Athletic Council gave letters to Frank Souchak, Averell Daniell, William Glassford, Nick Kliskey, Dante Delle Tazze, George Delich, Arnold Greene, Hubert Randour, Leon Shedlosky, Frank Patrick, Paul Shaw, Vincent Sites, Arthur Detzel, Luther Richards, Don Hensley, John Michelosen, Bobby LaRue, William Stapulis, Walter Miller, Tony Matisi, Leo Malarkey and Marwood Stark.

Assistant backfield coach Howard O'Dell was hired as head backfield coach at Harvard.

== All-Americans ==
- Art Detzel (tackle) – First team Newspaper Editors Association; Honorable mention United Press; Honorable mention Davis J. Walsh (INS)
- Hubert Randour (halfback) – Third team United Press; Honorable mention Newspapers Editors Association; Honorable mention Davis J. Walsh (INS)
- Bobby LaRue (halfback) – Honorable mention Newspaper Editors Association; Honorable mention United Press;
- Nick Kliskey (center) – Honorable mention United Press; Honorable mention Davis J. Walsh (INS)
- Frank Patrick (halfback) – Honorable mention Davis J. Walsh (INS)
