= Kelly Moan =

American football player (1911–1954)

- Moan, circa 1935

No. 7
- Position: Halfback

Personal information
- Born: October 20, 1911; Laramie, Wyoming, U.S.
- Died: August 3, 1954 (aged 42); Wheeling, West Virginia, U.S.
- Listed height: 6 ft 0 in (1.83 m)
- Listed weight: 193 lb (88 kg)

Career information
- High school: Long Beach (Long Beach, California)
- College: West Virginia (1934–1937)
- NFL draft: 1938: 7th round, 58th overall pick

Career history
- Jersey City Giants (1938); Cleveland Rams (1939)
- Stats at Pro Football Reference

Robert Emmett "Kelly" Moan (October 20, 1911 – August 3, 1954) was an American professional football player for the Cleveland Rams of the National Football League (NFL). He played college football for the West Virginia Mountaineers and was selected by the New York Giants with the 58th overall pick of the 1938 NFL draft.

== Early life ==
Robert Emmett Moan was born on October 20, 1911, in Laramie, Wyoming. He played high school football at Long Beach Polytechnic High School in Long Beach, California, with his senior year being in 1931.

== College career ==
Moan played junior college football at Long Beach Junior College from 1932 to 1933 as a quarterback. He then enrolled at Washington State College but was ruled ineligible.

Moan was on the freshman football team at West Virginia University in 1934. He was a three-year varsity letterman for the Mountaineers from 1935 to 1937, and was considered a triple-threat halfback.

== Professional career ==
Moan was selected by the New York Giants in the seventh round, with the 58th overall pick, of the 1938 NFL draft. He played for the Giants' farm team, the Jersey City Giants of the American Association, during the 1938 season as a quarterback/right halfback. He appeared in eight games, starting two, for the Giants, scoring two passing touchdowns and one rushing touchdown. Moan also converted two of four extra point attempts.

On August 2, 1939, Moan signed with the Cleveland Rams for the 1939 season. He played in the first two games of the year for the Rams as a reserve tailback/defensive halfback, completing three of nine passes for 77 yards, one touchdown, and two interceptions. He also converted one of one extra points and rushed twice for -15 yards. He was released on September 28, 1939.

== Personal life ==
Moan spent time in the United States Navy. He continuing lived in West Virginia after his college career and worked a variety of jobs. On August 3, 1954, he was working on the Ninth Street Bridge in Wheeling, West Virginia when he fell 70 feet into the water and drowned. It was his first day of work at his new job.
