= Gene Rosenthal =

American basketball player (1914–2006)

Personal information
- Born: August 5, 1914 Pittsburgh, Pennsylvania, U.S.
- Died: April 19, 2006 (aged 91) Los Angeles, California, U.S.
- Listed height: 5 ft 11 in (1.80 m)
- Listed weight: 175 lb (79 kg)

Career information
- High school: Allderdice (Pittsburgh, Pennsylvania)
- College: Carnegie Mellon (1935–1938)
- Position: Forward

Career history
- 1938–1939: Pittsburgh Pirates

Eugene "Yaney" Rosenthal (August 5, 1914 – April 19, 2006) was an American professional basketball player. He played college basketball and football for Carnegie Mellon University. Rosenthal then played in the National Basketball League for the Pittsburgh Pirates during the 1938–39 season and averaged 3.3 points per game.
